= List of dramas broadcast by Sanlih E-Television =

This is a list of programmes produced and broadcast on Sanlih E-Television, a television channel in Taiwan. Dramas broadcast but not produced by the channel are excluded from the list.

Legend
| SET Taiwan Aired Dramas | SET Metro Aired Dramas |

== SET Taiwan ==
=== Daily 8pm dramas ===
| Airing date | Chinese title | English title | Number of episodes | Avg. viewership | Notes | Official website |
| 22 May 2000 - 8 Aug 2000 | 阿扁與阿珍 | Ah Bian and Ah Jane | 57 | | | |
| 8 Aug 2000 - 26 Oct 2000 | 伴阮過一生 | Accompany me Through Life | 58 | | | |
| 26 Oct 2000 - 21 Feb 2001 | 九指新娘 | Nine Refers to the Bride | 85 | | | |
| 21 Feb 2001 - 29 Jan 2002 | 台灣阿誠 | Taiwan Ah Cheng | 245 | | | |
| 29 Jan 2002 - 19 Jun 2002 | 負君千行淚 | Negative Line of Tears | 102 | | | |
| 19 Jun 2002 - 22 Jul 2003 | 台灣霹靂火 | Taiwan Thunderbolt | 285 | | | |
| 22 Jul 2003 - 24 Feb 2004 | 天地有情 | World Affectionate | 156 | | | |
| 24 Feb 2004 - 22 Jun 2005 | 台灣龍捲風 | Taiwan Tornado | 345 | | | |
| 22 Jun 2005 - 16 Aug 2006 | 金色摩天輪 | Golden Ferris Wheel | 301 | | | |
| 16 Aug 2006 - 19 Sep 2007 | 天下第一味 | The Unique Flavor | 286 | | | |
| 19 Sep 2007 - 25 Jun 2008 | 我一定要成功 | I Must Succeed | 201 | | | |
| 25 Jun 2008 - 2 Sep 2009 | 真情滿天下 | Love Above All | 311 | 4.24 | | Website |
| 2 Sep 2009 - 10 Nov 2010 | 天下父母心 | Parents' Love | 311 | 5.02 | | Website |
| 10 Nov 2010 - 30 Nov 2011 | 家和萬事興 | Lee's Family Reunion | 275 | 4.65 | | |
| 29 Nov 2011 - 21 Nov 2012 | 牽手 | Wives | 256 | 4.43 | | Website |
| 21 Nov 2012 - 21 Nov 2013 | 天下女人心 | The Heart of Woman | 262 | 3.40 | | Website |
| 21 Nov 2013 - 28 Jul 2015 | 世間情 | Ordinary Love | 437 | 5.20 | | Website |
| 28 Jul 2015 - 14 June 2017 | 甘味人生 | Taste of Life | 491 | | | |
| June 14, 2017 – January 9, 2018 | 一家人 | In the Family | 150 | | | Website |
| Jan 9, 2018 – Dec 26, 2018 | 金家好媳婦 | 100% wife | 250 | | | Website |
| Dec 26, 2018 – 5th August 2020 | 炮仔聲 | The Sound of Happiness | 413 | | | Website |
| August 5, 2020 – March 9, 2022 | 天之驕女 | Proud of You | 408 | | | Website |
| 9 March, 2022 - May 3, 2023 | 一家团圆 | Family Reunion | 301 | | | Website |
| May 3, 2023 – July 10, 2024 | 天道 | Fight for Justice | 310 | | | Website |
| July 10, 2024 – | 願望 | Desires | | | | Website |

=== Friday ===
| Airing date | Chinese title | English title | Number of episodes | Avg. viewership | Notes | Official website |
| 28 Oct 2011 - 30 Mar 2012 | 愛。回來 | Way Back into Love | 22 | 1.52; Cable Avg Viewship:1.75 | | Website |
| 6 Apr 2012 - 24 Aug 2012 | 雨夜花 | Rainy Night Flower | 21 | 2.61 | | Website |
| 31 Aug 2012 - 22 Mar 2013 | 阿爸的願望 | Father's Wish | 30 | 3.24 | | Website |
| 29 Mar 2013 - 13 Sep 2013 | 含笑食堂 | Flavor of Life | 25 | 1.74 | | Website |
| 20 Sep 2013 - 28 Feb 2014 | 孤戀花 | White Magnolia | 23 | 2.09 | | Website |
| 7 Mar 2014 - 8 Aug 2014 | 熱海戀歌 | Once Upon a Time in Beitou | 23 | 1.68 | | Website |
| 15 Aug 2014 - 30 Jan 2015 | 阿母 | Our Mother / A-Mu | 23 | 2.23 | | Website |
| 6 Feb 2015 - 3 Jul 2015 | 珍珠人生 | Life of Pearl | 22 | 2.03 | | Website |
| 10 Jul 2015 - 16 Oct 2015 | 思慕的人 | An Adopted Daughter | 15 | 1.61 | | Website |
| 4 Mar 2016 - 29 Jul 2016 | 紫色大稻埕 | La Grande Chaumiere Violette | 22 | 0.97 | | Website |
| 5 Aug 2016 - 2 Dec 2016 | 白鷺鷥的願望 | My Sister | 21 | | | Website |
| 14 June 2019 - 8 Nov 2019 | 天之蕉子 | The Love Story in Banana Orchard | 22 | | | Website |

== SET Metro ==
=== Sunday idol dramas ===
Most of the Sunday idol dramas are broadcast first on TTV.

| Airing Date | Chinese Title | English Title | Number of Episodes | Main cast | TTV Avg Viewership | Genre | Notes | Official Website |
|---|---|---|---|---|---|---|---|---|
| 8 Dec 2001 - 9 Feb 2002 | 薰衣草 | Lavender | 10 | Ambrose Hsu, Tammy Chen, Wang Jian Long, Penny Lin, Joe Chen | | | | |
| 21 Jul - 17 Nov | MVP情人 | My MVP Valentine | 18 | Angela Chang, Yen Hsing-su, Tony Sun, Lin Li-Wen, David Chen, Lee Hsing-wen, Gao Tien-Chi, Joe Chen, Jason Hsu, Zax Wang, Sam Wang, Lu Jien-Yu, Yen Yun-Hao, Hsia Jing-Ting, Chen Kuan-Lun, Yang Jie-Mei | | | | |
| 24 May 2003 - 20 Sep | 海豚灣戀人 | Love At the Dolphin Bay | 18 | Angela Chang, Ambrose Hsu, Wallace Huo, Jill Hsu, Penny Lin, Liang Xiu Shen, Ge Wei Ru, Linda Liu, Deric Wan | | | | |
| 3 Oct - 31 Jan 2004 | 西街少年 | Westside Story | 18 | Tony Sun, Cyndi Wang | | | | |
| 7 Feb - 8 May | 雪天使 | Snow Angel | 15 | Toro | | | | |
| 15 May - 4 Sep | 紫禁之巔 | Top on the Forbidden City | 17 | JR, Gino | | | | |
| 11 Sep - 15 Jan 2005 | 天國的嫁衣 | Heaven’s Wedding Gown | 19 | | | | | |
| 22 Jan - 4 Jun | 格鬥天王 | MR. FIGHTING | 20 | Tony Sun, Esther Liu | | PG - Battle Scenes | | |
| 11 Jun - 22 Oct | 王子變青蛙 | The Prince Who Turns into a Frog | 20 | Joe Chen, Ming Dao, Sam Wang, Joyce Chao, Gino, Su Li Xin, Wang Juan, Huang Yu Rong, Anthony | | | | |
| 29 Oct - 11 Feb 2006 | 綠光森林 | Green Forest, My Home | 23 | Esther Liu, Leon Jay Williams, Ethan Juan, Song Zhi Ai | | Education; Romance | | |
| 18 Feb - 15 Jul | 愛情魔髮師 | Magicians of Love | 22 | Ming Dao, Joanne Zeng Sam Wang, Jacky Zhu, Huang Yu Rong, Sonia Sui, Sun Ai Hui Adriene Lin, Xiao Jie, Zhao Shun | 4.62 | Magic | | |
| 22 Jul - 11 Nov | 微笑PASTA | Smiling Pasta | 17 | Cyndi Wang, Nicholas Teo, Gino, Zhao Hong Qiao, Zhao Shun, Jian Chang, Wang Juan, Hu Kang Xing, Song Zhi Ai, Wu Zhen Ya, Shen Meng Sheng, Bao Zheng Fang, Di Zhi Jie, Wei Ru | 4.19 | Cooking; Romance | | |
| 18 Nov - 10 Mar 2007 | 愛情經紀約 | Engagement for Love | 15 | | | | | |
| 17 Mar - 28 Jul | 放羊的星星 | My Lucky Star | 20 | Jimmy Lin, Yoo Ha-na, Hong Xiao Ling, Leon Jay Williams, Lee Wei, Wang Dao, Dong Zhi Cheng, Huang Yu Rong, Chen Wei Min, Zheng Xiao Hui, Tsai Pei Lin, Guo Shi Lun, Niu Cheng Ze, Meng Ting Li, Fu Pei Ci, Li Zhi Qin, Cheng Bo Ren, Lin Yi Hong, Renzo Liu | 2.97 | Melodrama | | |
| 4 Aug - 17 Nov | 櫻野3加1 | My Best Pals | 16 | Ming Dao, Chen Qiao En, Jason Hsu, Jerry Huang, Zhang Xin Yu, Liu Zhe Ying, Hang Li Ren, Ye Min Zhi, Li Tian Zhu, Viter Fan | 2.19 | Teens | | |
| 24 Nov - 15 Mar 2008 | 鬥牛，要不要 | Hooping Dulcinea | 17 | Mike He, Hebe Tien, Lee Wei, Liang Zhe, Huang Pai Jun, Godfrey Gao, Ding Chun Cheng, Cao Wei Xuan, George Zhang, Jian Chang, Cyndi Chaw, Ai Wei, Tan Ai Zhen, Xie Qi Wen, Hu Kang Xing, Peggy Zheng, Lin Shou Jun, Wang De Sheng, Ke Huan Ru, Chen Wei Han, Wang Xin Yi, Zhang Yong Zheng, Wang Juan, Chien Te-men, Zhu De Gang, Judy Zhou | 2.13 | Basketball | | |
| 22 Mar - 30 Aug | 命中注定我愛你^{1} | Fated to Love You | 24 | Ethan Juan, Joe Chen, Baron Chen, Bianca Bai, Tan Ai Zhen, Na Wei Xun, Lin Mei Shiu, Jessica Song, Zhong Xin Ling, Wei Min Ge, Luo Bei An, Wang Juan Ji, Tian Jia Da, Patrick Li | 7.44 | Romance | | |
| 30 Aug - 3 Jan 2009 | 無敵珊寶妹 | Invincible Shan Bao Mei | 19 | Nicholas Teo, Amber Kuo, Roy Chiu, Hong Xiao Ling, Wang Yi Fei, Liang He Qun, George Zhang, Zhong Xin Ling, Guan Yong, Tony Fish, Chen Han Dian | 3.22 | Period | | |
| 10 Jan - 6 Jun | 敗犬女王 | Queen of No Marriage | 21 | Cheryl Yang, Ethan Juan, Sylvia Yang, Lene Lai, James Wen, Harry Lai, Jessica Song, Da Bing, Zhu Xinyi, Ying Wei-min, Li Peixu, Jun Laiting, Zhao Zi Qiang, Wai-Man Chan, Lin Mei-Shiu, Wang Dao | 5.69 | | | |
| 13 Jun - 3 Oct | 福氣又安康 | Easy Fortune Happy Life | 17 | Blue Lan | 4.02 | | | |
| 10 Oct - 6 Mar 2010 | 下一站，幸福 | Autumn's Concerto | 21 | Ady An, Vanness Wu, Ann Hsu, Chris Wu, Xiao Xiao Bin | 5.80 | Melodrama | | |
| 13 Mar - 24 Jul | 偷心大聖PS男 | The PS Man | 21 | | 4.25 | | | |
| 31 Jul - 4 Dec | 鍾無艷 | Zhong Wu Yen | 19 | Cheryl Yang | 2.42 | | | |
| 11 Dec - 16 Apr 2011 | 國民英雄 | Channel X | 19 | | 1.10 | PG | Remake of Singaporean TV series Unriddle. | |
| 23 Apr - 20 Aug | 醉後決定愛上你 | Love You | 18 | Rainie Yang, Joseph Chang, Ann Hsu, Alien Huang, Kingone Wang, Tom Price, Chung Hsin-ling, Jay Di, Renzo Liu, Na Wei-hsun, Charge Pu, Tao Chuan Zheng, Deng Jiu Yun, Jessica Song, Chi-wen Hsieh, Lin Mei Shiu, Lo Pei-an, Yen Chia-le, Wang Chuan | 4.12 | Romance | Remake of Fated to Love You. | |
| 27 Aug 2011 - 18 Feb 2012 | 小資女孩向前衝 | Office Girls | 25 | Alice Ko, Roy Chiu, James Wen | 5.12 | Working Population | | |
| 25 Feb - 21 Jul 2012 | 向前走向愛走 | Love Forward | 22 | Amber Kuo, Tammy Chen, Tony Yang, Weber Yang | 2.38 | | | |
| 28 Jul 2012 - 5 Jan 2013 | 螺絲小姐要出嫁 | Miss Rose | 23 | Megan Lai, Roy Chiu, Paul Hsu, Tia Lee, Zhao Jun Ya, Puff Guo | 3.49 | | | |
| 12 Jan - 8 Jun 2013 | 金大花的華麗冒險 | King Flower | 21 | James Wen, Nikki Hsieh, Chris Wu, Hsueh Shih-ling | 1.57 | | | |
| 15 Jun - 2 Nov | 真愛黑白配 | Love Around | 21 | Annie Chen, George Hu | 2.17 | | | |
| 9 Nov 2013 - 5 Apr 2014 | 回到愛以前 | Deja Vu | 22 | Mandy Wei, Yao Yuan Hao, Jenna Wang, Nylon Chen | 1.76 | | | |
| 12 Apr - 23 Aug 2014 | 愛上兩個我 | Fall In Love With Me | 20 | Aaron Yan, Tia Lee | 1.55 | | | |
| 30 Aug 2014 - 10 Jan 2015 | 再說一次我願意 | Say Again Yes I Do | 20 | Lin Yo-Wei, Mandy Wei, Michael Chang, Vivi Lee | 1.29 | | | |
| 17 Jan - 30 May 2015 | 聽見幸福 | Someone Like You | 20 | Kingone Wang, Lorene Ren | 1.88 | | | |
| 6 Jun - 17 Oct | 他看她的第2眼 | When I See You Again | 20 | Jasper Liu, Mandy Wei, Jet Chao, Ivy Shao | 2.07 | | | |
| 24 Oct 2015- 28 Feb 2016 | 愛上哥們 | Bromance | 18 + 1 | Baron Chen, Megan Lai, Bii, Sean Lee, Katie Chen | 2.28 | | | |
| 6 Mar - 26 Jun 2016 | 後菜鳥的燦爛時代 | Refresh Man | 17 | Aaron Yan, Joanne Tseng, Lene Lai, Jack Lee | 2.42 | | | |
| 3 Jul - 6 Nov 2016 | 狼王子 | Prince of Wolf | 18 | Amber An, Derek Chang, Samuel Gu, Katie Chen, Hsueh Shih-ling | 1.50 | | | |
| 13 Nov 2016 - 19 Mar 2017 | 浮士德的微笑 | Behind Your Smile | 19 | Marcus Chang, Eugenie Liu, Sean Lee, Hongshi, Esther Yang | 1.44 | | | |
| 26 Mar - 30 Jul 2017 | 我的愛情不平凡 | The Masked Lover | 19 | Weber Yang, Mini Tsai, Kurt Chou, Genie Chen | 1.17 | | | |
| 6 Aug - 3 Dec 2017 | 噗通噗通我愛你 | Memory Love | 18 | Andy Chen, Mandy Wei, Jolin Chien, Mandy Tao, Kris Shen, Nylon Chen | 0.84 | | | |
| 10 Dec 2017 - 8 Apr 2018 | 已讀不回的戀人 | See You in Time | 16 | Hans Chung, Mini Tsai, Esther Huang, David Chiu | 0.89 | | | |
| 15 Apr - 12 Aug | 三明治女孩的逆襲 | Between | 18 | Marcus Chang, Stars Yeh, Sam Lin, Sean Lee | 1.22 | | | |
| 19 Aug - 26 Dec | 高校英雄傳 | Campus Heroes | 16 | Wes Lo, Juno Liu, Frankie, Jenny Huang | 0.48 | | | |
| 6 Jan - 28 Apr | 你有念大學嗎？ | Hello Again! | 16 | Amber An, Bruce Hung, Sean Lee, Mao Di | 1.40 | | | |
| 5 May - 1 Sep | 月村歡迎你 | Back to Home | 18 | Ken Hsieh, Cosmos Lin, Wu Nien-hsuan, Lee Chia-yu, Yang Kuei-mei | 1.37 | | | |
| 8 Sep 2019 - 19 Jan 2020 | 網紅的瘋狂世界 | Let's Go Crazy on LIVE! | 20 | Ben Wu, Chloe Xiang, Jolin Chien, Zhuo Yu Tong | 0.90 | | | |
| 2 Feb 2020 - 31 May 2020 | 跟鯊魚接吻 | The Wonder Woman | 18 | Aviis Zhong, Wes Lo, Jack Lee, Chang Chin-lan, Gabriel Lan, Ying Fu | --- | | | |
| 7 June - | 浪漫輸給你 | Lost Romance | -- | Marcus Chang, Vivian Sung, Simon Lian, Kelly Liao, Jason Hsu, Tsai Jui-hsueh | --- | | | |

=== Friday idol dramas ===
All of the Friday idol dramas are TTV co-productions with SET idol dramas.

| Airing Date | Chinese Title | English Title | Number of Episodes | Main cast | TTV Avg Viewership | Genre | Notes | Official Website |
|---|---|---|---|---|---|---|---|---|
| 11 Oct 2008 - 21 Mar 2009 | 波麗士大人 | Police et vous | 24 | | 1.88 | | | |
| 28 Mar - 1 Aug | 比賽開始 | Play Ball | 20 | | 1.51 | | | |
| 8 Aug - 2 Jan 2010 | 那一年的幸福時光 | The Year of Happiness and Love | 21 | James Wen, Amber Kuo, Wu Nien Jen, Kay Huang, Leroy Young, Ke Yi Zheng, Ke Yu Lun, Tsai Chen Nan, Lin Mei Xiu, Sonia Sui, Wu Ding Qian, Adriene Lin, Luo Bei An, Zhu De Gang, Ivy Fan, Chen Xi Sheng, Peter Pan, Hong Sheng Wen | 1.90 | | | |
| 9 Jan - 29 May | 第二回合我愛你 | Lucky Days | 20 | Tammy Chen, Chris Wang, Fan Kuan-yao, A Hsi, Lin Mei-shiu, Ma Nien-hsien, Chiang Li-li, Tu Tai-Feng, Kuan Yung, Ying Tsai-ling, Lin Wei-li, Ma Li-ou, Yvonne Yao, Hu Ying-chen, Ke Shu-yuan, Jessica Song, Wang Chien-min, Chen Yu-fang, Peggy Fu | | | | |
| 5 Jun - 30 Oct | 倪亞達 | Ni Yada | 16 | | 1.10 | | | |
| 6 Nov - 16 Apr 2011 | 犀利人妻 | The Fierce Wife | 23 | Sonia Sui, Wen Sheng Hao, Chris Wang, Amanda Zhu, A Bao, Hu Ying Zheng, Patrick Li, Mini Bin, Guan Yong, Zhou Jia Li, Pan Li Li, Xi Man Ning, Janel Tsai, Fu Lei, Lin Zhi Xian | 1.48 | | | |
| 18 Sep - 25 Dec | 勇士們 | Soldiers | 15 | | 0.43 | | | |

^{1}The finales were shortened to 30–45 minutes for the above dramas.

=== Daily 8pm dramas ===
Most of the 8pm Idol dramas are broadcast first on SET Metro.

| Airing Date | Chinese Title | English Title | Number of Episodes | Main cast | SET Metro Avg Viewership | Genre | Notes | Official Website |
|---|---|---|---|---|---|---|---|---|
| 13 DEc 2011-9 Apr 2012 | 真愛找麻煩 | Inborn Pair | 84 | Annie Chen, Chris Wang, Puff Guo, Ken Hsieh | 2.54 | | | |
| 10 April - 30 Jul | 愛上巧克力 | Ti Amo Chocolate | 80 | Vanness Wu, Joanne Tseng, Michael Zhang, Prince Chiu, Hsueh Shih-ling, Kuo Shu-yao | 1.87 | | | |
| 31 July –26 Nov | 剩女保鏢 | Sweet Sweet Bodyguard | 82 | Alien Huang, Summer Meng | 1.97 | | | |
| 27 Nov 2012 –25 Mar 2013 | 愛情女僕 | Lady Maid Maid | 67 | Nicholas Teo, Reen Yu, Janel Tsai, Danny Liang, Katherine Wang | 0.96 | | | |
| 26 March –22 July | 兩個爸爸 | Two Fathers | 73 | Weber Yang, Lin Yo-wei, Megan Lai | 2.33 | | | |
| 23 Jul - 28 Oct | 幸福選擇題 | Second Life | 70 | Penny Xie, Cyndi Wang, Jiekai Siou, Pink Yang | 1.28 | | | |
| 29 Oct 2013 –10 Feb 2014 | 有愛一家人 | Love Family | 72 | Chris Wang, Serena Fang, Jack Lee, Amanda Chou | 1.72 | | | |
| 11 Feb –27 May 2014 | 女人30情定水舞間 | Fabulous 30 | 76 | Vivi Lee, Ling Hung, Esther Huang, Danson Tang, Darren Chiu, Hans Chang | 1.70 | | | |
| 28 May –2 Sept | 媽咪的男朋友 | Tie The Knot | 70 | Cheryl Yang, Nylon Chen, Kingone Wang, Mandy Tao, Steven Sun | 1.22 | | | |
| 3 Sept – 15 Dec | 幸福兌換券 | Love Cheque Charge | 74 | George Hu, Phoebe Yuan, KunDa Hsieh, Jay Shih, Smile Weng, Jet Chao, Jessie Chang | 1.06 | | | |
| 16 Dec 2014 –13 Apr 2015 | 我的寶貝四千金 | Dear Mom | 84 | Jennifer Hong, Joanne Tseng, Albee Huang, Beatrice Fang, Shiou Chieh Kai, Melvin Sia, Duncan Chow, Jack Lee | 1.89 | | | |
| 28 Mar - 1 Aug | 好想談戀愛 | Be With You | 72 | Bobby Dou, Huang Peijia, Nylon Chen, Vivi Lee | 1.56 | | | |
| 23 Jul –3 Nov 2015 | 軍官·情人 | Bitter Sweet | 74 | Ma Zhi Qin, Kou Hsi-Shun, Esther Liu, Ahn Zhe, Tracy Chou, Xiu Jie Kai, Michael Zhang, Steven Sun, Esther Yang | 2.02 | | | |
| 4 Nove 2015 –23 Mar 2016 | 戀愛鄰距離 | Love or Spend | 77 | Kingone Wang, Hong Xiao Ling, Jolin Chien, Dayuan Lin | 1.54 | | | |
| 24 Feb - 31 May 2016 | 大人情歌 | The Love Song | 70 | Darren Chiu, Vivi Lee, Tracy Chou, Sean Lee, Steven Sun, Julie Ting | 1.00 | | | |
| 1 Jun –23 Aug 2016 | 我的極品男友 | Better Man | 60 | Lin Yo-Wei, Tender Huang, Jolin Chien, Cindy Lien, Shara Lin, Hope Lin | 1.45 | | | |
| 26 Oct 2016 –24 Jan 2017 | 獨家保鑣 | V-Focus | 65 | Melvin Sia, Ling Hung, Huang Wei Ting, Yorke Sun | 1.17 | | | |
| 7 Mar - 1 June | 只為你停留 | Just For You | 63 | Patrick Lee, Esther Huang, Jolin Chien, Vera Yen | 1.15 | | | |
| 24 Oct - 8 Dec 2017 | 真情之家 | Home Sweet Home | 34 | Miao Ke-li, William Hsieh, Yorke Sun, Esther Yang, Vivi Lee, JR | 0.66 | | | |
| 8 Jan - 12 Mar 2019 | 必勝大丈夫 | My Hero, My Daddy | 41 | Tsai Chen-nan, Yang Li-yin, Amanda Chou, Kurt Chou, Linda Lin, David Chiu, Teresa Chen | 1.39 | | | |

=== Friday dramas ===
All of the Friday idol dramas are TTV/SET Metro co-productions with SET idol dramas.

| Airing Date | Chinese Title | English Title | Number of Episodes | Main cast | TTV/SET Metro Avg Viewership | Genre | Notes | Official Website |
|---|---|---|---|---|---|---|---|---|
| 8 November 2012 –21 February 2013 | 我租了一個情人 | Love Me or Leave Me | 16 | Chris Wang, Hsu Wei-ning | 0.95 | | | |
| 28 Feb – 13 Jun 2013 | 大紅帽與小野狼 | Big Red Riding Hood | 16 | Yao Yuanhao, Cheryl Yang | 0.21 | | | |
| 21 June – 8 Nov 2013 | 就是要你愛上我 | Just You | 21 | Puff Kuo, Aaron Yan | 1.33 | | | |
| 15 Nov 2013 – 16 May 2014 | 我的自由年代 | In a Good Way | 26 | Lego Lee, Lorene Ren, Jay Shih, TzyMann Weng | 1.97 | | | |
| 23 May – 17 Oct 2014 | 喜歡·一個人 | Pleasantly Surprised | 22 | Puff Kuo, Jasper Liu, Lene Lai, Jolin Chien | 1.57 | | | |
| 24 Oct 2014 – 13 March 2015 | 22K夢想高飛 | Aim High (TV series) | 20 | Lego Lee, Chris Wang, Summer Meng, Kuo Shu-yao | 0.90 | | | |
| 20 Mar – 24 July 2015 | 莫非，这就是爱情 | Murphy's Law of Love | 19 | Danson Tang, Ivelyn Lee, Jolin Chien, Jenna Wang | 1.20 | | | |
| 7 Aug 2015 – 1 Jan 2016 | 料理高校生 | Love Cuisine | 22 | Lego Lee, Allison Lin, Duncan Chow, Nita Lei | 2.02 | | | |
| 22 Jan – 1 Jul 2016 | 1989一念間 | Back to 1989 | 21 | Marcus Chang, Ivy Shao, Mini Tsai, Yorke Sun, Ray Yang, Chang Chieh | 1.83 | | | |
| 8 July – 4 Nov 2016 | 飛魚高校生 | Swimming Battle | 18 | Kingone Wang, Mandy Wei, Enson Chang, Cindy Yen, Emerson Tsai | 1.34 | | | |
| 3 March – 4 August 2017 | 極品絕配 | The Perfect Match | 22 | Wu Kang-jen, Ivy Shao, Ben Wu, Xiao Man, Nylon Chen | 1.62 | | | |
| 12 January 2018 - 20 April 2018 | 姊的時代 | Iron Ladies | 13 | Aviis Zhong, Ben Wu, Zhu Zhi-Ying, Wu Ting-Chien, Ada Pan, Jack Lee | 0.98 | | | |
| 29 March - | 一千個晚安 | A Thousand Goodnights | 20 | Nicholas Teo, Lien Yu-Han, Li Chung Lin, Pipi Yao | --- | | | |
| 16 August - | 用九柑仔店 | Yong-Jiu Grocery Store | 13 | Derek Chang, Christina Mok | -- | | | |
| TBA | 邵雨薇 | Frozen Heart | 25 | Mario Maurer Ivy Shao Samuel Gu Aggie Hsieh William Hsieh Margaret Wang Sean Lee Sonia Sui Yang Lie Hsueh Shih-ling Ruyun He Au Tanakorn Posayanon | --- | | | |
| TBA | 張立昂張軒睿 | Rent Real Boy | 15 | Marcus Chang Kimberley Anne Woltemas Derek Chang Amanda Chou Chen Bor-jeng Belle Chuo | --- | | | |
| TBA | 言承旭 | Marriage Exposed | 20 | Jerry Yan Ariel Lin | --- | | | |
| TBA | 言承旭劇之吻 | Count Your Lucky Day | 24 | Jirayu Tangsrisuk Amber An | --- | | | |
