= SET Metro =

- Country: Taiwan
- Network: Sanlih E-Television
- Headquarters: Taiwan

History
- Launched: September 1, 1995

Links
- Website: http://www.settv.com.tw/metro/

SET Metro (Chinese: 三立都會台) is a television channel of the Sanlih E-Television in Taiwan, launched in September 1995. It mainly broadcasts Taiwanese drama and cartoons.

== Productions Drama ==
=== Daily ===
==== 8PM ====
- Inborn Pair
- Ti Amo Chocolate
- Sweet Sweet Bodyguard
- Lady Maid Maid
- Two Fathers
- Second Life
- Love Family
- Fabulous 30
- Tie The Knot
- Love Cheque Charge
- Dear Mom
- Be with You
- Bitter Sweet
- Love or Spend
- The Love Song
- Better Man
- V-Focus
- Just for You

==== 9PM ====
- Gung Hay Fat Choy
- Love, Now
- A Hint of You

=== Friday ===
==== 10:30 PM ====
- Police et vous
- Play Ball
- The Year of Happiness and Love
- Lucky Days
- Ni Yada
- The Fierce Wife
- Soldier

==== 8PM ====
- Love Me or Leave Me
- Big Red Riding Hood

==== 10PM ====
- Just You
- In a Good Way
- Pleasantly Surprised
- Aim High
- Murphy's Law of Love
- Love Cuisine
- Back to 1989
- Swimming Battle
- The Perfect Match

=== Saturday ===
- Lavender
- My MVP Valentine
- At Dolphin Bay
- Westside Story
- Snow Angel
- Top on the Forbidden City
- La robe de mariée des cieux
- Mr. Fighting
- The Prince Who Turns into a Frog
- Green Forest, My Home
- Magicians of Love
- Smiling Pasta
- Engagement for Love
- My Lucky Star
- My Best Pals
- Bull Fighting
- Fated to Love You
- Invincible Shan Bao Mei
- My Queen
- Easy Fortune Happy Life
- Autumn's Concerto
- PS Man
- Jhong Wu Yan
- Channel-X
- Love You
- Office Girls
- Love Forward
- Miss Rose
- King Flower
- Love Around
- Déjà Vu
- Fall in Love with Me
- I do²
- Someone Like You
- When I See You Again
- Bromance
- Refresh Man
- Prince of Wolf
- Behind Your Smile
- The Masked Lover
- Lost Romance
- Frozen Heart
- Marriage Exposed
- Rent Real Boy
- Count Your Lucky Day

=== Sunday ===
==== 11:00 PM ====
- The Promise of the Soul

=== Others ===
- 100% Senorita
- Taipei Family (Season 2-3) (See Taipei Family)
- Wang's Class Reunion
- Be With Me
