= Proud of You =

Proud of You may refer to:

- "Proud of You", an English commercial song by Cantopop artist, Fiona Fung, from 2003
- "Proud of You", a song from the 10 Years album Division, 2008
- "Proud of You", a song from the Gucci Mane album Delusions of Grandeur, 2019
- "Proud of You", a track on the Young Stoner Life compilation album Slime Language 2, 2021
- "Proud of You", a song from the Ne-Yo album Self Explanatory, 2022
- Proud of You (天之驕女), a Taiwanese TV series starring Eric Huang, Angel Han and Angus Hsieh

== See also ==
- "I Am So Proud of You"
