= Sweet Sweet Bodyguard =

2012 Taiwanese television series

- Also known as: 剩女保鏢
- Genre: Romance, Comedy
- Directed by: Fung Kai
- Starring: Alien Huang; Summer Meng; Lee Lee-zen; Yuan Ai-fei
- Opening theme: Shen Hun Dian Dao (神魂電到) by Elleya Tao
- Ending theme: You Don't Know by Coke Lee
- Country of origin: Taiwan
- Original language: Mandarin
- No. of seasons: 1
- No. of episodes: 82

Production
- Production location: Taiwan
- Running time: 60 minutes per episode (includes commercials)
- Production company: SETTV

Original release
- Network: SET Metro
- Release: 31 July – 26 November 2012

Related
- Ti Amo Chocolate; Lady Maid Maid; Inborn Pair

Sweet Sweet Bodyguard
- Traditional Chinese: 剩女保鏢
- Simplified Chinese: 剩女保镖
Transcriptions

Sweet Sweet Bodyguard (traditional Chinese: 剩女保鏢; simplified Chinese: 剩女保镖; pinyin: Shèng Nǚ Bǎo Biāo; lit. 'Leftover Girl as Bodyguard') is a 2012 Taiwanese television series starring Alien Huang and Summer Meng, and directed by Golden Bell Award-winning director Fung Kai.

The drama began filming on 6 June 2012 and debuted on 31 July 2012, airing daily at 8pm on cable TV SET Metro and ending on 26 November 2012 at a total of 82 episodes.

== Synopsis ==
Raised up in a military family and trained to become a bodyguard, Zhen Ai-Ji (played by Summer Meng) is all about responsibility, loyalty and honor. But at heart, she is an ordinary young girl who is eager to fall in love. In order to prevent herself from becoming a "leftover girl" at too early of an age, she decided that her next mission will also be her last one. However, what she did not expect was that her new client, He Zhong-Qi (played by Alien Huang) the CEO of a famous motor company, would be such a difficult person to get along with...

== Cast ==
=== Main ===
Actor	Role	Details
Alien Huang	He Zhong-Qi	CEO of the famous Run-Zhi Motor Company
Summer Meng	Zhen Ai-Jia	Bodyguard to He Zhong-Qi
Lee Lee-zen	Zheng Ya-Lun	Well-known plastic surgeon
Yuan Ai-fei	Du Cai-Jie	Hired as a personal detective to spy on Zheng Ya-Lun

=== Supporting ===
Actor	Role	Details
Tan Ai-chen	Shi Jin-Xiu	He Zhong-Qi's foster grandmother
Fu Lei	Qin Qi-Hong	He Zhong-Qi's foster father, Zheng Ya-Lun's biological father
Liu Rui-Qi	You Min-Hui	Qin Qi-Hong's wife, He Zhong-Qi's foster mother
Chen Bo-Zheng	Zhen Shi-Hao	Zhen Ai-Jia's father
Ke Shu-Qin	Li Qin-Mei	Caretaker of Run-Zhi Motor Company
Yu Han-Mi	Qin Ming-Yu	Qin Qi-Hong and You Min-Hui's only daughter
Zeng Zi-Yu	Du Cheng-En	Du Cai-Jie's younger brother
Crystal Lin	Shen Ting-Ting	Li Qin-Mei's daughter
Xu Hao-Xuan	Shen Wei-Qiang	Li Qin Mei's son, Shen Ting-Ting's younger brother
Luo Xuan-Ming	Zheng Wei Ni	Zheng Ya-Lun's son
Qiu Jun-Ru	Cheng Jian-Bao aka Brother Bao	Bodyguard
Lai Dong-Xian	Jia Ge-Biao aka Brother Biao	Bodyguard
Xia Ru-Zhi	Ding Xue-Ling	Zheng Ya-Lun's ex-girlfriend, Zheng Winnie's biological mother

== Soundtrack ==
Song Type	Song Name	Singer	Details
Opening theme	Shen Hun Dian Dao 《神魂電到》	Elleya Tao	
Closing theme	You Don't Know	Coke Lee	
Insert songs	Forgot How To Be Happy 《忘了怎麼快樂》	Alien Huang	Lyrics written by Huang himself
Insert songs	Hao Bu Hao 《好不好》	Coke Lee	
Insert songs	Wei Xiao De Dian Ying 《微笑的電影》	Jing-Wen Zeng	
Insert songs	Ni Shuo Ai, Ran Hou Ne 《你說愛，然後呢》	Jing-Wen Zeng	
Insert songs	Yuan Lai Ai Shi Zhe Yang 《原來愛是這樣》	Elleya Tao	
Insert songs	Yes I Do	Elleya Tao	
