= When I See You Again =

2015 Taiwanese television series

- Promo poster
- Also known as: He Saw Her a 2nd Time
- 他看她的第2眼
- Genre: Romance; Comedy
- Created by: Sanlih E-Television
- Written by: Du Xin Yi; Wang Yu Qi
- Directed by: Chen Jia Hong; Zhang Jin Rong
- Starring: Jasper Liu; Mandy Wei; Jet Chao; Ivy Shao
- Opening theme: "Warning 預告" by GJ
- Ending theme: "In Fact You Already Know 其實你已經知道" by Dawen
- Country of origin: Taiwan
- Original language: Mandarin
- No. of seasons: 1
- No. of episodes: 20

Production
- Executive producer: Xie Xiao Fen
- Producer: Chen Hui Ying
- Production location: Taiwan
- Camera setup: Multi camera
- Running time: 90 minutes
- Production companies: Sanlih E-Television; I Production Co. Ltd.

Original release
- Network: TTV
- Release: May 31 – October 11, 2015

When I See You Again (Chinese: 他看她的第2眼; pinyin: tā kàn tā de dì èr yǎn ) is a 2015 Taiwanese romantic comedy television series produced by Sanlih E-Television, starring Jasper Liu, Mandy Wei, Jet Chao and Ivy Shao as the main cast. The Chinese title literally translates to "He Saw Her A 2nd Time". Filming began on May 12, 2015 and continued as it aired. First original broadcast began May 31, 2015 on TTV channel airing on Sunday nights from 10:00–11:30 pm.

== Synopsis ==
Ocean Private Equity, Director of Investment Xia You Qian is young, handsome and particularly good at his job. His keen eye to detail has helped him advance in his career and has given him the special ability to "read others' minds". But unknown to most, ten years ago he was an unattractive, geeky student who was constantly made fun of and bullied by fellow students in his hometown, Pu Lang Village. One day, as he was being bullied, a popular and pretty girl, An Xi, came to his rescue. You Qian eventually fell-in-love with An Xi after she displayed multiple acts of kindness towards him despite his unusual appearance and habits. On the day he'd risked his life hiking the woods of Pu Lang Village to obtain what An Xi wished for (a small bottle of Angel's Tears, which was simply the water from a hard-to-get lake near the village), he caught her at a bad moment because she had just found out her mother left her and was never going to come back. With her frustration in mind, she took out all her anger on the poor boy who had just come to profess his admiration to her. Heartbroken by her harsh words, You Qian leaves Pu Lang Village, promising never to return.

Ten years later, work forces You Qian to go back to Pu Lang Village when the CEO of Ocean Private Equity has plans to develop in the village and sends him there in advance to scout the land. With his changed outer appearance and confidence demeanor, none of the village residents recognizes the ex-villager. He re-encounters An Xi and misinterprets that she has become a gold digger when she goes to the same hotel he is staying at to meet her creditor who holds the loan debt of her hostel inn. After getting acquainted with the village locals he realize that An Xi is still the kind selfless person he remembers her to be. He decides to help her get out of debt from the creditor who is trying to force her into marrying him. After getting her land title back from her creditor, You Qian then decides to hold on to the inn's deed. He feels that An Xi does not even feel sorry for causing him the harm that she did so many years back, and takes to her to be a cold hearted individual. Hurt from her cold attitude when talking about his old self (the "guy who confessed to her"), he decides to attempt to get revenge on her. Yet his plans don't quite go as he wishes.

== Cast ==
=== Main cast ===
- Jasper Liu as Xia You Qian – Male age 28
- Mandy Wei as An Xi – Female age 28
- Jet Chao as Hu Yan Ze – Male age 30
- Ivy Shao as Hu Yong Qing – Female age 27

=== Supporting cast ===
- Vent Teng as Xia Bai Kang – Male age 75
- Debbie Chou as Zhou Zhi Yue – Female age 52
- Deyn Li as Zhong Da Yu – Male age 25
- Lawrence Liu as Zhang Ya Lu – Male age 28
- Zooey Tseng as Zhang Ya En – Female age 26
- Tina Chou as Wu Zhi Lin – Female age 28
- Sara Ding (Xiu Qin) as Jin Mei Wen – Female age 38
- Kao Meng-chieh as Jiang Hai Kuo – Male age 32

=== Guest cast ===
- Lee Tien-yi as Anchor
- Wang Dao-nan as Tang Dong
- Yeh Hui-chi as Village Leader
- Kuo Hsuan-chi as Da Hu
- Lin Yu-hsien as Xiao Hu
- Chen Yu-bi as Yuan Zhang
- Lu Fu-ling as Yuan Zhang's wife
- Tseng Zi-yi as Xu Da Wei
- Michael Huang as An Ding Yuan
- Chiao Zi-chi as Zi Qi
- Hope Lin as Jennifer
- Ric Huang as Da Fei Ge

== Development and casting ==
- A press conference was held on May 12, 2014 at SETTV headquarters lobby in Neihu District, Taipei introducing the main leads of the drama. The blessing ceremony was also held later that day in front of SETTV main entrance.
- The premier press conference was held on Friday May 29, 2015 12:30 pm at TTV headquarters in Songshan District, Taipei. The extended cast was unveiled and an extended 12-minute trailer was previewed. Fans were also invited via first-come, first-served seating to meet the cast.

== Broadcast ==
Channel	Country	Airing Date	Timeslot
TTV HD	Taiwan	May 31, 2015	Sunday 10:00–11:30 pm
SETTV	Taiwan	June 6, 2015	Saturday 10:00–11:30 pm
StarHub TV	Singapore	July 4, 2015 (until August 8, 2015)	Saturday 8:00–9:30 pm
StarHub TV	Singapore	August 15, 2015	Saturday 10:00–11:30 pm
Astro Shuang Xing	Malaysia	October 28, 2015	Monday to Friday 4:00–5:00 pm
NOW26	Thailand	July 18, 2016	Monday to Thursday 8:00–9:00 am

== Episode ratings ==
Competing dramas on rival channels airing at the same time slot were:
- CTV – The Crossing Hero, The Day I Lost U
- FTV – Leo, Pisces, Aquarius

Air Date	Episode	Average Ratings	Rank
May 31, 2015	1	1.33	1
June 7, 2015	2	1.72	1
June 14, 2015	3	1.98	1
June 21, 2015	4	1.99	1
June 28, 2015	5	2.20	1
July 5, 2015	6	2.45	1
July 12, 2015	7	2.25	1
July 19, 2015	8	2.16	1
July 26, 2015	9	2.18	1
Aug 2, 2015	10	1.97	1
Aug 9, 2015	11	2.85	1
Aug 16, 2015	12	2.48	1
Aug 23, 2015	13	2.29	1
Aug 30, 2015	14	2.08	1
Sep 6, 2015	15	1.94	1
Sep 13, 2015	16	1.90	1
Sep 20, 2015	17	1.83	1
Sep 27, 2015	18	1.67	1
Oct 4, 2015	19	1.94	1
Oct 11, 2015	20	2.24	1
Average ratings		2.07	

== Awards and nominations ==
Ceremony	Category	Nominee	Result
2015 Sanlih Drama Awards	Best Actor Award	Jasper Liu	Nominated
2015 Sanlih Drama Awards	Best Actress Award	Mandy Wei	Nominated
2015 Sanlih Drama Awards	Best Screen Couple Award	Jasper Liu & Mandy Wei	Nominated
2015 Sanlih Drama Awards	Best Kiss Award	Jasper Liu & Mandy Wei	Nominated
2015 Sanlih Drama Awards	Best Green Leaf Award	Kao Meng-Chieh	Nominated
2015 Sanlih Drama Awards	Best Green Leaf Award	Sara Ding	Nominated
2015 Sanlih Drama Awards	Best Powerful Performance Award	Debbie Chou	Nominated
2015 Sanlih Drama Awards	Best Powerful Performance Award	Vent Teng	Nominated
2015 Sanlih Drama Awards	Best Selling S-Pop Magazine Award	Jasper Liu	Nominated
2015 Sanlih Drama Awards	Best Selling S-Pop Magazine Award	Mandy Wei	Nominated
2015 Sanlih Drama Awards	Viewers Choice Drama Award	When I See You Again	Nominated
