= Endless Nights in Aurora =

- Theatrical release poster
- 極光之愛
- Directed by: Lee Szu-yuan
- Written by: Lee Szu-yuan
- Based on: a play by Hugh Lee
- Produced by: Moon Wang
- Starring: Rainie Yang; Chris Wang
- Edited by: Chen Hsiao-tong; Shieh Meng-ju
- Music by: Veronica Lee
- Distributed by: Applause Entertainment
- Release dates: November 6, 2014 (Golden Horse Film Festival); December 19, 2014 (Taiwan)
- Running time: 110 minutes
- Country: Taiwan
- Language: Mandarin
- Budget: NT$40 million
- Box office: NT$8.3 million (Taipei)

Endless Nights in Aurora (Chinese: 極光之愛) is a 2014 Taiwanese romantic drama film directed by Lee Szu-yuan. It stars Rainie Yang and Chris Wang. It was released on December 19, 2014.

== Plot ==
Revolving around the romantic relationship of two generations, Alisha and her mother Xiao-feng, two parallel love stories are re-enacted across two and a half decades. With equally heated passion, the star-crossed lovers in different generations are faithfully attached to their experiences in love through promises, anticipation, losses, and forgiveness.

== Cast ==
- Rainie Yang as Alisha
- Chris Wang as Kai
- Chi Chin as Wang Xiao-feng (2014)
- Didy Lin as Wang Xiao-feng (1990)
- Austin Lin as Chang Bei-chuan
- Jack Lee as Yolo
- Mandy Wei as Coco
- Fan Kuang-yao as Mr. Chang
- Moon Wang as Mrs. Chang
- Yang Li-yin as Mrs. Yang
- Ralf Chiu as Ralph
- Phoebe Huang as Motel owner
- Kimi Hsia as Yuan Yuan
- Kuo Tzu-chien as Professor Chen
- Chu Te-kang as Doctor
- Chiu Yi-feng as Dede (2014)
- Wang Tzu-wei as Dede (1990)

== Soundtrack ==
Endless Nights in Aurora Original Soundtrack

Soundtrack album by Various artists
- Released: December 12, 2014
- Genre: Film soundtrack
- Length: 52:18
- Labels: Sony Music Taiwan, B'In Music International

No.	Title	Performer	Length
1.	"Little Child 小小孩"	Fish Leong	04:44
2.	"True Stories 真實故事改編"	Stone Shih	05:07
3.	"Until the World Cries Out 直到世界都哭泣"	Huang Kuo-lun	05:01
4.	"69th Parallel North 我在北緯69度等你"	Veronica Lee	02:04
5.	"Back for More"	Veronica Lee, Jeff Li	02:02
6.	"Immobile Gypsy 不能流浪的吉普賽人"	Veronica Lee	01:30
7.	"Christmas 聖誕"	Veronica Lee	01:24
8.	"Light House 富貴角"	Veronica Lee	02:03
9.	"Beichuan is Dead 為等待流的眼淚 (OT:直到世界都哭泣)"	Veronica Lee	02:23
10.	"I Am Available 有空"	Veronica Lee	01:22
11.	"One Thing I Know"	Takki Wong	02:16
12.	"Something to Tell 有事"	Veronica Lee	01:55
13.	"O Perfect Love"	Veronica Lee	02:18
14.	"Sisters 出門"	Veronica Lee	04:05
15.	"The Longing Night"	Veronica Lee, Takki Wong	03:16
16.	"Break Up 就是為了遺憾"	Veronica Lee	03:27
17.	"A Falling Star"	Jeff Li	02:40
18.	"Goodbye 永夜, 就是永遠的思念"	Veronica Lee	04:20

== Reception ==
The film has grossed NT$8.3 million at the Taipei box office.
