= Rookies' Diary =

Taiwanese television series

Rookies' Diary is a satirical military comedy television series and drama created in Taiwan. It has a total of 43 episodes of approximately 1 hour each. It aired from July 2, 2010 to April 22, 2011. The series is about how a group of teenagers whom are training in the military or army as recruits for 36 days. The director of the series is Wang Wei. It was also one of the most popular and well known dramas in Taiwan, because of it based on military and army just like the Singapore's military movies Ah Boys to Men and Ah Boys to Men 2 from the Ah Boys to Men film series, which was directed by popular and successful local film director Jack Neo.

== Cast ==
=== Officers and NCOs ===
- Lee Hsing-wen as Captain Ding Hao 丁浩
- Yao Yuan-hao as Second Lieutenant Sun An Bang 孫安邦
- Chantel Liu as Third class Master Sergeant Wang Sheng Nan 王勝男
- Huang Ti Chun "Debbie" as Lieutenant Jin Bi Ying 金碧瑩
- Zhao Jun Ya as Corporal Wang Wei 王威
- Pang Yong Zhi as Corporal Yu Shan Ren 余善仁
- Lin Ruo Ya as Second Lieutenant Qiu Jing Wen 邱靖雯
- Jun Hao Wang as Corporal Neng Zhi Li 李能之
- Jacky Chu as Captain Xu Jia Cheng 許家成
- Peng An Li as Lieutenant Colonel Kai Zhong Chen 陳楷中
- Shi Peng Shen as Lieutenant Colonel Hui Huang Yu 俞輝煌
- Dong Yu Xie as Corporal Zong Yuan Wang 王宗元
- Abel An as Liu Jian Xing 劉建星

=== Rookies ===
- Jampel Tang as Luo Gang 羅剛
- Fu Zi Chun as Yang Hai Shen 楊海生
- Chen De Lie as Lin Bo Wen 林博文
- Lin Dao Yuan as Lai Hu 賴虎
- Xie Zheng Hao as Cai Hao Zhi 蔡浩志
- Chen Wen Xiang as Qiu You Shun 邱有順
- Pan Bo Xi as Shi Jun 石俊
- Qian Jun Zhong as Ye Da Tong 葉大同
- Xia Zheng Feng as Wu Yong 吳勇
- A Gan as Chen Tian Bin 陳添彬
- Chen Bo Han as A Hou 阿猴
- Li Jia Wen as Liu Wei Di 劉偉帝
- Ai Cheng as Xiao De Ji 蕭德基
- Lin Zhi Yong as Wu Xiang Lin 吳祥麟

=== Others ===
- Kelly Chien as Tian Xing 田欣
- Su Yan Pei as Cai Zhen Zhu 蔡珍珠
- Zhang Jia Xin as Liu Su Qing 柳素卿
- Akio Chen as Luo Dao Chun 羅道存
- Zhang Qin as Shen Gui Mei 沈桂美
- Lin Yi Fang as Lai Mu Chun 賴木村
- Mei Fang as Gu Zhui Ma 古錐嬤
- Lin Mei Zhao as Jiang Mei Yu 江美玉
- Chen Bor-jeng as Cai Zhen Cai 蔡振財
- Joey Ya as Zheng Yu Ting 鄭玉婷
- Tang Zhen as Yan Xiao Rou 嚴小柔
- Achel Chang as Ye Xiao Yan 葉曉燕
- Yue Hong as Zheng Yu Que 鄭玉雀
- Liu Xiao Yi as Huang Li Hong 黃麗紅
- Du Shi Mei as Jian Pu Pu 簡噗噗
- Li Guo Chao as Li Ming Jie 李明杰
- Rand Chen as Chen Hao Nan 陳浩南
- Yang Li-yin as Yan Xiu Ru 楊秀如
