= Say Again Yes I Do =

2014 Taiwanese television series

- Also known as: I Do^{2}
- 再說一次我願意
- Genre: Romance
- Created by: Sanlih E-Television
- Written by: Yaya Chang 張綺恩; Li Jie Yu 李婕瑀; Xu Zhi Yi 徐志怡; Chen Bi Zhen 陳碧真
- Directed by: Yang Bu Xin 楊佈新
- Starring: Lin Yo Wei 林佑威; Mandy Wei 魏蔓; Michael Zhang; Vivi Lee
- Opening theme: Say Again Yes I Do 再說一次Yes I Do by Lin Yo Wei 林佑威
- Ending theme: Let Go, Travel 放下, 旅行 by Dino Li 李玉璽
- Country of origin: Republic of China (Taiwan)
- Original language: Mandarin
- No. of series: 1
- No. of episodes: 20

Production
- Executive producers: Pan Yi Qun 潘逸群; Chen Bi Zhen 陳碧真
- Producers: Leung Han Hui 梁漢輝; Xu Zhi Yi 徐志怡
- Production location: Taiwan
- Running time: 90 minutes
- Production company: Eastern Shine Production Co., Ltd. 東映製作

Original release
- Network: TTV
- Release: 24 August 2014 – 4 January 2015

Related
- Fall in Love with Me 愛上兩個我; Someone Like You 聽見幸福

Say Again Yes I Do (Chinese: 再說一次我願意; pinyin: Zai Shuo Yi Ci Wo Yuan Yi) also known as I Do^{2} is a 2014 Taiwanese television series created and produced by Sanlih E-Television. Starring Lin Yo Wei, Mandy Wei, Michael Zhang and Vivi Lee as the main leads. Filming began on August 6, 2014, and wrapped up on December 31, 2014, the drama was filmed as it aired. The series began airing on Sanlih's TTV channel on Sunday nights August 30, 2014 at 10:00 PM and will take over the timeslot of previous TTV drama "Fall in Love with Me 愛上兩個我". The 20-episode series concluded on January 4, 2015, when its final episode was aired.

== Synopsis ==
Can you rush true love before its time? Shu Xin Kui (Mandy Wei) met Xiang Zheng Yang (Lin Yo-Wei) four years ago and got married after a whirlwind romance of only a couple of months. But as the stress of married life set in – trying to get used to each other's habits and dealing with the extended in-laws – the young couple began to bicker and ended up divorcing just six months into their marriage. Four years later, Xin Kui and Zheng Yang meet up again when they both start working together as managers-in-training at the same hotel. As the same chemistry they initially felt toward each other starts to brew, can Xin Kui and Zheng Yang make a relationship work the second time around?

== Plot summary ==
Xiang Zheng Yang and Shu Xin Kui meet by accident when he takes her cup of coffee at a cafe. Later that day the two encounter each other again at a singles party that their friends dragged them to. After that faithful day the two embark on a whirlwind romance and decided to get married after only dating for a few months. After their flash marriage the two starts to see faults in each other and find each other annoying. She sees him as a controlling neat freak who has a love for amphibians. While he sees her as a messy clumsy oath who pigs out on junk food. Unable to cope with each other anymore the two agree to a divorce after six month of marriage.

On the day Zheng Yang and Xin Kui divorce is finalized and they divide their assets, the two have a huge fight over belongings. The two swear not to ever encounter each other again. While at the beach reminiscing of the good times he had with Xin Kui, Zheng Yang sees a woman about to drown and saves her. Ge Qian Qian has also just ended a relationship. After a few kind words about relationship issues from Zheng Yang at the hospital the two part ways.

Four years later fate brings Zheng Yang and Xin Kui back together, when their best friends who dragged them to the singles party, get married and ask them to be the best man and maid of honor at their wedding. The day after their friends wedding, both also find out they're candidates at the same "Mars Hotel" management training course, which is a job promotion for those who survive and passes the training course. Also a trainee at the same course is Qian Qian, the women Zheng Yang saved from drowning four years ago. Things get more complicated when the strict director of the training course is Ji Shi Yu, Qian Qian's former fiancée who she ran out on four years ago without giving any explanation.

Shi Yu is the stern supervisor who believes the guest at the hotel are always right even though they are not. He tells his trainees that no matter what the guest must always leave "Mars Hotel" feeling satisfy with the best hospitality provided to them. He acts cold towards Qian Qian because of how she ended their relationship, but deep down he still cares for her and wants to know the reason she had left him. Qian Qian truly loves Shi Yu and was set to marry him four years ago until she found out she could not fulfill his dream of having lots of children since her doctor told her she could never have a child.

After working closely together Zheng Yang and Xin Kui learn more about each other that they didn't know about before. The two decide to give their relationship another try but with Zheng Yang's family business in financial troubles and with his mother still disapproving Xin Kui, it puts a strain on their relationship from going forward.

Meanwhile, Shi Yu finds out from a family friend about Qian Qian's condition and realizes why she ran out on him. Still in love with her he tells her he does not mind that she can't have children. However Qian Qian still does not want to be a burden to Shi Yu and ask a friend to help her pretend that she's marrying someone else and tells Shi Yu that she doesn't love him anymore. Her actions breaks Shi Yu's heart and he starts to find comfort in Xin Kui to help him ease his broken heart.

== Cast ==
=== Main cast ===
- Lin Yo-wei 林佑威 as Xiang Zheng Yang 向正陽 - Male age 30

Shu Xin Kui's ex-husband and later husband again. The heir of Dong Hua Hotel and a trainee at Mars Hotel. He is a neat freak who has a love for amphibians. He meets Xin Kui by chance when he accidentally grabs her cup of coffee and later on the same day at a singles party. He proposes marriage to Xin Kui after dating for only 2 month but the two divorce after putting up with each other for 6 month. 4 years later the two encounter each other again at their friends wedding and when both are trainees at Mars Hotel. After learning about each other more a second time, the two give their relationship another try, but his family business crisis and his mother comes between them.

- Mandy Wei 魏蔓 as Shu Xin Kui 舒芯葵 - Female age 27

Xiang Zheng Yang's ex-wife and later wife again. An unorganized klutz who likes to pig out on junk food. She meets Zheng Yang when she has to chase after him for grabbing her cup of coffee. She agrees to marry him after dating for only 2 months but later divorces him when she can't stand his antics. Wanting a better life and better pay she signs up for the Mars Hotel training course in hopes of landing a manager position after completing the course. She was an orphan who was abandoned by her mother when she was young. Mother and daughter encounter each other again at the hotel. After realizing her ex-husband Zheng Yang is a caring and understanding man the two give their relationship another try but his family business, his mother and his childhood friend Liang Man Ni tries to come between them.

- Michael Zhang 張勛傑 as Ji Shi Yu 紀時宇 - Male age 31

Ge Qian Qian ex-fiancee and Director of Mars Hotel management training course. A strict and stern supervisor who believes the guest are always right even if they are not. He highly believes in offering all guest the best service the staff can offer. Still in love with his former fiancee Qian Qian, he is clueless to way she ran out on him 4 years ago until a mutual family friend tell him that Qian Qian in unable to have children.

- Vivi Lee 李維維 as Ge Qian Qian 葛芊芊 - Female age 28

Ji Shi Yu's former fiancee and Mars Hotel trainee. 4 years ago she ran out on Shi Yu when she found out she was unable to have children. She also meets Zheng Yang on that faithful day when he thinks she is committing suicide and saves her from drowning. She is a quiet reserved person who always puts other first. When Shi Yu finds out the truth about her condition and wants to reconcile she has a friend pretend to be her lover in order not to be a burden to Shi Yu.

=== Supporting cast ===
==== Mars Hotel ====
- Yvonne Yao 姚采穎 as Xiao Li Wen 蕭莉玟

Mars Hotel manager.

- Qiao Zi Qi 喬子齊 as Xiao Li Wen's assistant
- Jenny Huang 黃甄妮 as Weng Mei Fang (Omega) 翁美芳

Mars Hotel trainee.

- Yao Chun Yao 姚淳耀 as Dai Zhi Cheng 戴志誠

Mars Hotel trainee.

- Wu Zhong Qiang 吳仲強 as Lan Yan Hu 藍晏琥

Mars Hotel trainee.

- Angie Tang 唐琪 as elder sister Yuan 阮大姐

Senior Mars Hotel house-keeping employee. Family friend of Shu Xin Kui.

- Tan Ai-chen 譚艾珍 as Gao Grandmother 高奶奶

Wife of the founder of Mars Hotel. She and Shu Xin Kui's grandparents where friends.

- Xenia Yang 楊雅筑 as Gao Yu Rou 高雨柔

Daughter of Mars Hotel's Chairman. Arrogant and spoiled she ask for unreasonable demands from the hotel staff.

==== Extended casts ====
- An Wei Ling 安唯綾 as Chen Mo Li 陳茉莉

Shu Xin Kui's friend and Cai Tao Gui's wife. She was the friend that dragged Xin Kui to the singles party. At first not interested in her husband Tao Gui but the two get married 4 years later. She helps her husband run and manage a manga rental shop.

- Lin Jun Yong 林埈永 as Cai Tao Gui 蔡陶貴

Xiang Zheng Yang's friend and Chen Mo Li's husband. The friend that dragged Zheng Yang to the singles party where he met with Xin Kui. A nerdy looking guy whom his wife was originally not interested in, but the two get marry four years later. He and his wife own a manga rental store.

- Amanda Chou 周曉涵 as Liang Man Ni 梁嫚妮

Xiang Zheng Yang's childhood friend who has been in love with him since they were young. Zheng Yang's mother highly likes her and wants her to marry Zheng Yang in order to strengthen the family business. She plays victim and lies about Xin Kui in order to come between Xin Kui and Zheng Yang.

- Danny Liang 梁正群 as Liang Lei Hao 梁雷浩

Liang Man Ni's older brother and CEO of the RC Group. While preparing to take over Mars Hotel and Dong Hua Hotel he sees Xin Kui hardworking attitude and becomes attracted to her. He helps protect Xin Kui from his sister's lies.

- Jackson Lou 樓學賢 as Liang Ba Tian 梁霸天

Liang Man Ni and Liang Lei Hao's father. RC Group founder and close family friend of the Xiang family. He also owns large shares of Mars Hotel and Dong Hua Hotel.

- Yang Li-yin 楊麗音 as Li Gui Yun 李桂雲

Xiang Zheng Yang's mother. She highly objects to her sons relationship with Shu Xin Kui as she sees Xin Kui as someone that brings down Zheng Yang. Due to the family hotel business in shambles she wants her son to marry his rich childhood friend Liang Man Ni in order to strengthen the family finances.

- Gao Zheng-peng 高振鵬 as Xiang De Hai 向德海

Founder of Dong Hua Hotel and Xiang Zheng Yang's grandfather. When he dies Dong Hua Hotel is put in crisis when the managing employees plans a hostile take of the hotel from his family.

- Hsieh Chi-wen 謝其文 as Zheng Wu Yin 鄭梧賢

Dong Hua Hotel Managing Director. After Xiang Zheng Yang's grandfather dies he tries to hostile take over Dong Hua Hotel.

- Li Fang Wen 李芳雯 as Ye Chun Xia 葉春霞

Mr. Kawase's soon to be wife and Shu Xin Kui's mother who abandoned her when she was a little girl. She arrives at Mars Hotel to get married. Once she realizes that Xin Kui is her daughter she wants to recognize her as her daughter again.

- Wang Tao Nan 王道南 as Mr. Kawase 川瀨老大

A Japanese VIP guest at Mars Hotel. He goes to the hotel to have his wedding. He supports his wife when she recognizes Xin Kui as her daughter again.

==== Guest role ====
- Angela Liu 劉珈瑄 as Cupid 丘比特

Little girl at cafe where Xiang Zheng Yang and Shu Xin Kui met.

- LeLe 樂樂 as Bei Bei 貝貝

A young guest at Mars Hotel who is left alone at her hotel room while her mother goes to work.

- Ye Hui Zhi 葉蕙芝 as Jian Min Shu 簡敏淑

Guest at Mars Hotel and Bei Bei's mother. She blames the hotel staff when her daughter becomes sick while she is left alone by her.

- Qiu Yu Xuan 邱榆琁 as young Shu Xin Kui 少年舒芯葵

Her mother abandoned her at a restaurant.

- Jack Lee 李運慶 as Andrew Cheng De An 程德安

VIP guest at Mars Hotel and Ge Qian Qian's friend who helps her lie to Ji Shi Yu.

- Samuel Gu 古斌 as Lai Ya Jun 賴亞君

Guang Cheng Group Vice President and Liang Lei Hao's University friend.

== Soundtrack ==
- Say Again Yes I Do (再說一次Yes I Do) by Lin Yo Wei 林佑威
- Remembering (念舊) by Lin Yo Wei 林佑威
- Let Go, Travel (放下, 旅行) by Dino Lee 李玉璽
- Dance With Me by Dino Lee 李玉璽
- The Next Hug (下一次擁抱) by Miu Chu 朱俐靜
- Run (跑) by Miu Chu 朱俐靜
- My Little Life (我的小生活) by Miu Chu 朱俐靜
- We In The Same Frequency (我們在同一個頻率) by Miu Chu 朱俐靜 & Ian Chen 陳彥允

== Publications ==
Say Again Yes I Do Original Novel (喜歡一個人原創小說)
- Author: Sanlih E-Television 三立電視監製; Chen Bi Zhen 陳碧真
- Genre: Fiction novel
- Published: 6 December 2014
- Publication place: Taiwan
- Media type: Print paperback
- Pages: 248
- ISBN: 9789863662259

* 6 December 2014 : Say Again Yes I Do Original Novel (再說一次我願意原創小說) - ISBN 9789863662259 - Author: Sanlih E-Television 三立電視監製 & Chen Bi Zhen 陳碧真 - Publisher: KADOKAWA Media (Taiwan) 台灣角川

A novel based on the drama was published detailing the entire story line of the drama. Spoilers are revealed in the novel before the drama finished airing. The book comes with a desktop foldout 2015 calendar

* 5 November 2014 : S-Pop Vol. 22 November 2014 (華流 11月號/2014) - Barcode 4717095578623 - Author: Sanlih E-Television 三立電視監製

Main leads Lin You Wei and Mandy Wei were featured on the regular issue of November 2014 issue of S-Pop magazine. The issue came with the gift of one of two random 2015 calendar with the Pleasantly Surprised drama theme.

== Broadcast ==
Channel	Country	Airing Date	Timeslot
TTV HD	Taiwan	August 24, 2014	Sunday 10:00-11:30 pm
SETTV	Taiwan	August 30, 2014	Saturday 10:00-11:30 pm
ETTV	Taiwan	August 31, 2014	Sunday 8:30-10:00 pm
Astro Quan Jia HD	Malaysia	November 21, 2014	Friday 10:00 pm–12:00 am
StarHub TV	Singapore	November 15, 2014	Saturday 8:00-9:30 pm
Amarin TV	Thailand	May 20, 2016	Monday–Friday 2:00–3:30 pm

== Episode ratings ==
Competing dramas on rival channels airing at the same time slot were:
- CTS - Empresses in the Palace
- CTV - Say I Love You, X Lies
- FTV - You Light Up My Star, The 1st Shop of Coffee Prince

Air Date	Episode	Average Ratings	Rank
August 24, 2014	01	1.29	1
August 31, 2014	02	1.22	1
September 7, 2014	03	1.25	1
September 14, 2014	04	1.43	1
September 21, 2014	05	1.37	1
September 28, 2014	06	1.23	1
October 5, 2014	07	1.17	1
October 12, 2014	08	1.25	1
October 19, 2014	09	1.09	1
October 26, 2014	10	0.96	1
November 2, 2014	11	1.32	1
November 9, 2014	12	1.13	1
November 16, 2014	13	1.32	1
November 23, 2014	14	1.39	1
November 30, 2014	15	1.24	1
December 7, 2014	16	1.48	1
December 14, 2014	17	1.34	1
December 21, 2014	18	1.31	1
December 28, 2014	19	1.34	1
January 4, 2015	20	1.61	1
Average ratings		1.29	

== Awards and nominations ==
Year	Ceremony	Category	Nominee	Result
2014	2014 Sanlih Drama Awards 華劇大賞	Best Actor Award	Lin Yo-wei	Nominated
2014	2014 Sanlih Drama Awards 華劇大賞	Best Actress Award	Mandy Wei	Nominated
2014	2014 Sanlih Drama Awards 華劇大賞	Best Foolishly Award	Yang Li-yin	Nominated
2014	2014 Sanlih Drama Awards 華劇大賞	China Wave Award	Lin Yo-wei	Nominated
2014	2014 Sanlih Drama Awards 華劇大賞	Weibo Popularity Award	Lin Yo-wei	Nominated
2014	2014 Sanlih Drama Awards 華劇大賞	Viewers Choice Drama Award	Say Again Yes I Do	Nominated
