= Swimming Battle =

- Promotional poster
- 飛魚高校生
- Genre: Romance; Sports
- Created by: Sanlih E-Television
- Written by: Luise; Chen Qun
- Directed by: Wu Meng En
- Starring: Kingone Wang; Mandy Wei; Enson Chang; Cindy Yen
- Opening theme: "Handsome to Break Up 帥到分手" by Nick Chou
- Ending theme: "When You Are Gone 餘波盪漾" by Hebe Tien
- Country of origin: Taiwan
- Original languages: Mandarin; English; Taiwanese
- No. of seasons: 1
- No. of episodes: 18

Production
- Producers: Yang Hong Zhi; Lin Yan Shen
- Production location: Taiwan
- Running time: 90 minutes
- Production companies: Sanlih E-Television; Deepwaters Digital Support Inc.

Original release
- Network: SET Metro; EBC Variety
- Release: 8 July – 4 November 2016

Related
- Back to 1989; The Perfect Match; Love Cuisine

Swimming Battle (Chinese: 飛魚高校生; pinyin: fēi yú gāo xiào shēng) is a 2016 Taiwanese romance, sports television series created and produced by Sanlih E-Television. It stars Kingone Wang, Mandy Wei, Enson Chang and Cindy Yen. Filming began on June 1, 2016, and wrapped up on October 20, 2016. First original broadcast began on July 8, 2016, on SET Metro airing every Friday night at 10:00-11:30 pm.

== Synopsis ==
Can a woman who can't remember her past and a man who is trying to hide his true identity break a swim team's losing streak? Yu Die (Mandy Wei) was a genius child prodigy who lost everything she loved. Yu Die's mother drowned while trying to save Yu Die and, in one very bad day, Yu Die lost her mother, her memory and her ability to swim. Years later, she crosses paths with Gao Hai Fei (Kingone Wang), the CEO of a multibillion corporation. Intrigued by Yu Die's lost memories, Hai Fei hides his true identity from her and gets mistaken for a professional part-time worker who is a jack-of-all-trades. Yu Die asks Hai Fei for his help with the “Flying Fish” Men's Swim Team, which has never been able to win a meet and is the laughing stock of the sport of swimming. With Hai Fei searching for a “mermaid” crush from his past, will he agree to help Yu Die turn the losing swim team around?

== Cast ==
=== Main cast ===
- Kingone Wang as Gao Hai Fei （Phillip）
  - Liao Bai Xiang as childhood Hai Fei
- Mandy Wei as He Yu Die
  - Ella Wilkins as childhood Yu Die
- Enson Chang as Lin Ke Le
  - Qiu Chen En as childhood Ke Le
- Cindy Yen as Fei Ou Na （Fiona）
- Emerson Tsai as Chen Jia Luo (Ah Luo)
  - Cai Rui Ze as childhood Ah Luo

=== Supporting cast ===
- Peter Guan as Fang Yi Lei
- Aaron Lai as Wang Er Tai
- Roy Chang as You Yu An
- Huang Hung-hsuan as Ruan An Zhuo
- Ally Chiu as Du Xiao Mi
- Zoey Lin as Luo Shan Shan
- Dewi Chien as Qiao Ke Qi
- Ban Tie Xiang as He Xing Xiong
- Pa Yu as Pan Duo La
- Charles Tu as Jin Chen Lang (Ah Lang)
- Wayne Song as Cui Min Hao
- Collins Ying as Ying Shao Hua
- Vic Lin as An Ge Ming (Ah Wei)
- Tina Chou as Hei Mo Li

=== Cameos ===
- Chang Fu-chien as school principal
- Gao Wei Teng as director of student affairs
- Tu Kai Xiang as section manager
- Lu Wen Xue as Fang Jia Hao
- Jennifer Yin as Sandy Wang
- Lin Hai Er as Ke Le's mother
- Wu Shi Wei as Mr. Cheng
- Yang Li-yin as Auntie Hua Zhi
- Zhang Chang Mian as Qing Fang
- Chen Wan Hao as Uncle Black Carp
- Zhuang Zhuang as Reporter Wang
- Li Bo Ming as reporter
- Tan Ai-chen as Gao Yan Ming Zhu
- Darren Do as Lei Long En
- Michael Tao as Fei Tian Ci

== Soundtrack ==
- Handsome to Break Up 帥到分手 by Nick Chou
- When You Are Gone 餘波盪漾 by Hebe Tien
- Every Day is a Miracle 人間煙火 by Hebe Tien
- A Dream Where You Dreamt of Me 我夢見你夢見我 by Yoga Lin
- Unshakeable Rascals 熱血無賴 by Yoga Lin
- Spoiled Innocence 天真有邪 by Yoga Lin
- Structure of the Heart 心的構造 by Nicola Tsang
- What Is The Shape Of Your Love 你的愛是甚麼形狀 by J.Arie

== Broadcast ==
Network	Country	Airing Date	Timeslot
SET Metro	Taiwan	July 8, 2016	Friday 10:00-11:30 pm
EBC Variety	Taiwan	July 9, 2016	Saturday 10:00-11:30 pm
Astro Shuang Xing	Malaysia	July 8, 2016	Friday 10:00-11:30 pm
E City	Singapore	July 17, 2016	Sunday 10:00-11:30 pm
True Asian Series HD	Thailand	Nov 18, 2017	Saturday to Sunday 8:00-9:00 pm
UNTV	Philippines	This 2021	TBA

== Episode ratings ==
Competing dramas on rival channels airing at the same time slot were:

- FTV - My Teacher Is Xiao-he
- SET Taiwan - La Grande Chaumiere Violette, My Sister
- TTV - Life List, Q series

Air Date	Episode	Average Ratings	Rank
Jul 8, 2016	1	1.40	1
Jul 15, 2016	2	1.25	1
Jul 22, 2016	3	1.45	1
Jul 29, 2016	4	1.36	1
Aug 5, 2016	5	1.36	3
Aug 12, 2016	6	1.18	3
Aug 19, 2016	7	1.41	3
Aug 26, 2016	8	1.29	3
Sep 2, 2016	9	1.38	2
Sep 9, 2016	10	0.96	3
Sep 16, 2016	11	1.27	3
Sep 23, 2016	12	1.37	2
Sep 30, 2016	13	1.38	3
Oct 7, 2016	14	1.47	2
Oct 14, 2016	15	1.42	2
Oct 21, 2016	16	1.38	2
Oct 28, 2016	17	1.26	2
Nov 4, 2016	18	1.62	2
Average ratings			

== Awards and nominations ==
Year	Ceremony	Category	Nominee	Result
2016	2016 Sanlih Drama Awards	Viewers Choice Drama Award	Swimming Battle	Nominated
2016	2016 Sanlih Drama Awards	Best Actor Award	Kingone Wang	Won
2016	2016 Sanlih Drama Awards	Best Actress Award	Mandy Wei	Nominated
2016	2016 Sanlih Drama Awards	Best Potential Award	Peter Guan	Nominated
2016	2016 Sanlih Drama Awards	Best Crying Award	Kingone Wang & Mandy Wei	Nominated
2016	2016 Sanlih Drama Awards	Best Kiss Award	Kingone Wang & Mandy Wei	Nominated
2016	2016 Sanlih Drama Awards	Best Screen Couple Award	Kingone Wang & Mandy Wei	Nominated
2016	2016 Sanlih Drama Awards	Viewers Choice Drama's Song Award	"Handsome to Break Up" - Nick Chou	Won
2016	2016 Sanlih Drama Awards	Viewers Choice Drama's Song Award	"Unshakeable Rascals" - Yoga Lin	Nominated
