= Lin Kun-hai =

Taiwanese entrepreneur (1954–2022)

- Born: 10 February 1954; Kaohsiung, Taiwan
- Died: 14 February 2022 (aged 68); Zuoying, Kaohsiung, Taiwan
- Occupation: Entrepreneur
- Years active: 1983–2022
- Known for: Co-founder and chairman of Sanlih E-Television

Lin Kun-hai (Chinese: 林崑海; 10 February 1954 – 14 February 2022) was a Taiwanese program producer and entrepreneur, co-founder and chairman of Sanlih E-Television.

== Life and career ==
Lin was born in Kaohsiung and grew up in Kaohsiung City. Prior to founding a video rental shop as a joint venture with his wife and brother-in-law Chang Rong-hua, Lin was a taxi driver. In 1983, Lin, his wife Chang Hsiu, and his brother-in-law Chang Rong-hua jointly established Sanlih Film and Television, purchasing machines, duplicating videotapes, and then renting out videotape rental shops. Lin was regarded as the leader of the Taiwan Forward faction within the Democratic Progressive Party, and mounted an unsuccessful independent legislative campaign in 2001.

=== Death ===
Lin suffered from oral cancer for many years and died at Kaohsiung Veterans General Hospital, on 14 February 2022, at the age of 68.
