= Fall in Love with Me (TV series) =

2014 Taiwanese romantic comedy television series

- Promotional poster
- 愛上兩個我
- Genre: Romantic comedy
- Created by: Sanlih E-Television
- Written by: Yaya Chang 張綺恩; Li Jie Yu 李婕瑀; Wu Wei Jun 吳維君; Xu Zhi Yi 徐志怡; Chen Bi Zhen 陳碧真
- Directed by: Ker Choon Hooi 郭春暉
- Starring: Aaron Yan 炎亞綸; Tia Lee 李毓芬; Jack Li 李運慶; Katherine Wang 王凱蒂
- Opening theme: "1/2" (二分之一) by Aaron Yan 炎亞綸 & G.NA
- Ending theme: "This Is Not Me" (這不是我) by Aaron Yan 炎亞綸
- Country of origin: Taiwan
- Original language: Mandarin
- No. of episodes: 20

Production
- Executive producers: Pan Yi Qun 潘逸群; Chen Bi Zhen 陳碧真
- Producers: Leung Hon Fai 梁漢輝; Xu Zhi Yi 徐志怡; Huang Tai Ying 黃台盈
- Production location: Taiwan
- Running time: 90 minutes
- Production company: Eastern Shine Production Co., Ltd. 東映製作

Original release
- Network: TTV
- Release: 6 April – 17 August 2014

Related
- Deja Vu 回到愛以前; Say Again Yes I Do 再說一次我願意

Fall in Love with Me (Chinese: 愛上兩個我; pinyin: Ai Shang Liang Ge Wo) is a 2014 Taiwanese television series created by Sanlih E-Television, starring Aaron Yan of Fahrenheit and Tia Lee of Dream Girls as the main cast. The Chinese title of the drama literally translates as "Fall in Love with Two of Me". Filming began on February 28, 2014. The 20-episode series began airing on TTV channel on Sunday nights at 10:00 PM starting on April 6, 2014 and took over the time slot of previous TTV drama "Deja Vu 回到愛以前". The drama was aired as it was being filmed.

At the 3rd Sanlih Drama Awards on December 14, 2014, Aaron Yan received the Best Actor award and the series was awarded the "Viewers Choice Drama". It was also voted as the "Best Chinese Language Drama of the Year" at the 3rd Annual DramaFever Awards.

== Synopsis ==
Lu Tian Xing (Aaron Yan) is a prodigy in Asia's advertising field. Rich, famous, and highly successful, he suddenly announces during a press conference that he will be taking a three-month break from the advertising life. With a simple disguise, he transforms himself into "Xiao Lu". Enter Tao Le Si (Tia Lee), a young woman who promised her late brother to protect his advertisement agency and his legacy. Unfortunately, business never picks up and Le Si had to battle with Tian Xing to stop her company from being sold. When Xiao Lu enters her office doors, Le Si initially thinks that he's Tian Xing, but the two men's personalities are complete opposites. Le Si finds herself drawn to Xiao Lu's warm temperament, but will their love last once she discovers the truth of his identity?

== Cast ==
=== Main cast ===
- Aaron Yan 炎亞綸 as Lu Tian Xing 路天行 (Episodes 01 - 20)/Xiao Lu 小鹿 (Episodes 01 - 11, 20)

Lu Tian Xing (Episodes 01- 20) - Lu Tian Xing has been named the 21st century prodigy of the marketing industry. He has a creative mind that is able to come up with award winning creations and marketing ideas. One day he realizes that he has lost his sense of creativity and decides to take a three-month vacation from work in order to find his inspiration again. He disguises himself as Xiao Lu and enters the OZ company to become an employee.
Xiao Lu (Episodes 01 - 11, 20) - Lu Tian Xing's alter ego. He enters the OZ company as Xiao Lu and forms a close bond with his co-workers, particularly his boss, Tao Le Si.

- Tia Lee 李毓芬 as Tao Le Si 陶樂思

Tao Le Si tries to stay afloat by managing her late brother's advertising company OZ. She is a hard worker who is always optimistic. Despite her hard work, she finds it difficult to run the company as she continues to lose customers to the point where she can barely pay her workers/friends. One day, during heavy traffic, she meets Lu Tian Xing, who later arrives at her house offering to buy OZ. Due to this offer, she automatically assumes that Lu Tian Xing is a coldhearted man with evil intentions, thus having a bad first impression of him. She has no idea that Xiao Lu is Lu Tian Xing in disguise when he comes to work for her company.

=== Supporting cast ===
- Jack Li 李運慶 as Leo 翁立洋

Works at OZ as the creative director of advertising. He is a very loyal and serious person. People who don't know him describe him as a person who has a cold robotic personality. Only his colleagues know the real him and see him as a big brother. He is very close to Tao Le Si which causes him confusion on how he really feels about her.

- Katherine Wang 王凱蒂 as Xu Miao Miao 徐妙妙

Works at OZ as a creative visual designer and has been Tao Le Si's best friend since college. She has a playful and active personality and often acts like a teenage girl. She likes to use her designs and drawings to express her inner thoughts and emotions.

=== Other cast ===
- Edison Huang 黃懷晨 as Wang Ting Wei 王廷威

Works at Tian Ji Advertising Company as an executive assistant.

- Hope Lin 林可彤 as Helen Cao Hai Lun 曹海倫

Works at Tian Ji Advertising Company as an executive secretary.

- Beatrice Fang 方志友 as Li Huan Huan 李歡歡

Tian Xings's childhood friend who is in love with him.

- Kao Ying Hsuan 高英軒 as Li Qi Xuan / Lance 李奇軒

Tian Ji Advertising's Chief Operations Officer and Huan Huan's older brother.

- Chen Bor-jeng 陳博正 as Fu Bo 福伯

Tian Xing's butler as well as a servant to the Li family.

- Alixia Kim as Asa Xa

Tian Xing's personal maid who previously worked in a special maid latte cafe in Japan.

- Jian Chang 檢場 as Tao De Li 陶得力

Tao Le Si's father who is a Chinese herbal medicine specialist.

- Xie Qiong Nuan 謝瓊煖 as Hong Xiu Luan 洪秀鑾

Tao Le Si's mother who is a chiropractor.

- Evan Yo 蔡旻佑 as Tao Le Yuan 陶樂源

Tao Le Si's older brother and the founder of OZ Advertising Company.

- Yang Ming Wei 楊銘威 as Jia Gai Xian 賈蓋先

Works at OZ as an assistant director.

== Soundtrack ==
Opening Theme

- 1/2 二分之一 by Aaron Yan 炎亞綸 feat. G.NA

Ending Theme

- This Is Not Me 這不是我 by Aaron Yan 炎亞綸

Insert Songs

- The Unwanted Love 多餘的我 by Aaron Yan 炎亞綸
- No Rules 沒規矩 by Aaron Yan 炎亞綸
- The Only Rose 唯一的玫瑰 by Aaron Yan 炎亞綸
- Taipei Dreamin 台北沉睡了 by Aaron Yan 炎亞綸
- Melted 融化了 by Popu Lady
- The Happiness Is Just Enough 這樣的幸福剛剛好 by Popu Lady
- The Warmth in the Pocket 口袋的溫度 by Hebe 田馥甄

== Broadcast ==
Channel	Country	Airing Date	Timeslot
TTV HD	Taiwan	April 6, 2014	Sunday 10:00 PM
SETTV	Taiwan	April 12, 2014	Saturday 10:00 PM
ETTV	Taiwan	April 13, 2014	Sunday 8:30 PM
E City	Singapore	June 28, 2014	Saturday 8:00 PM
Shuang Xing	Malaysia	August 13, 2014	Monday to Friday 10:30 PM
TVB Drama 1	Hong Kong	September 10, 2014	Monday to Friday 2:00 PM
Home Drama	Japan	November 25, 2014	Tuesday 1:15 PM
True Asian Series	Thailand	November 30, 2014	Saturday and Sunday 7:00 PM
GMA Network	Philippines	February 23, 2015	Monday to Friday 5:15 PM
GMA News TV	Philippines	March 13, 2017	Monday to Friday 11:00 PM

== Episode ratings ==
Competing dramas on rival channels airing at the same time slot were:
- CTS - Rock N' Road
- CTV - Master's Sun, Say I Love You
- FTV - First Kiss

Air Date	Episode	Average Ratings	Rank
April 6, 2014	1	1.95	1
April 13, 2014	2	1.32	1
April 20, 2014	3	1.07	1
April 27, 2014	4	1.28	1
May 4, 2014	5	1.27	1
May 11, 2014	6	1.14	1
May 18, 2014	7	1.45	1
May 25, 2014	8	1.52	1
June 1, 2014	9	1.28	1
June 8, 2014	10	1.19	1
June 15, 2014	11	1.58	1
June 22, 2014	12	1.34	1
June 29, 2014	13	1.47	1
July 6, 2014	14	1.35	1
July 13, 2014	15	1.86	1
July 20, 2014	16	1.70	1
July 27, 2014	17	2.16	1
August 3, 2014	18	2.17	1
August 10, 2014	19	2.33	1
August 17, 2014	20	2.58	1
Average ratings		1.55	1

== Awards and nominations ==
Year	Ceremony	Category	Nominee	Result
2014	2014 Sanlih Drama Awards 華劇大賞	Viewers Choice Drama Award	Fall in Love with Me	Won
2014	2014 Sanlih Drama Awards 華劇大賞	Best Actor Award	Aaron Yan	Won
2014	2014 Sanlih Drama Awards 華劇大賞	Best Actress Award	Tia Lee	Nominated
2014	2014 Sanlih Drama Awards 華劇大賞	Best Screen Couple Award	Aaron Yan & Tia Lee	Nominated
2014	2014 Sanlih Drama Awards 華劇大賞	Best Kiss Award	Aaron Yan & Tia Lee	Nominated
2014	2014 Sanlih Drama Awards 華劇大賞	Best Crying Award	Aaron Yan & Tia Lee	Nominated
2014	2014 Sanlih Drama Awards 華劇大賞	Best Lady Killer Award	Chen Bor-jheng	Won
2014	2014 Sanlih Drama Awards 華劇大賞	Best Lady Killer Award	Jian Chang	Nominated
2014	2014 Sanlih Drama Awards 華劇大賞	China Wave Award	Aaron Yan	Nominated
2014	2014 Sanlih Drama Awards 華劇大賞	China Wave Award	Tia Lee	Nominated
2014	2014 Sanlih Drama Awards 華劇大賞	Weibo Popularity Award	Aaron Yan	Won
2014	2014 Sanlih Drama Awards 華劇大賞	Weibo Popularity Award	Tia Lee	Nominated
