= Tan Ai-chen =

Taiwanese actress

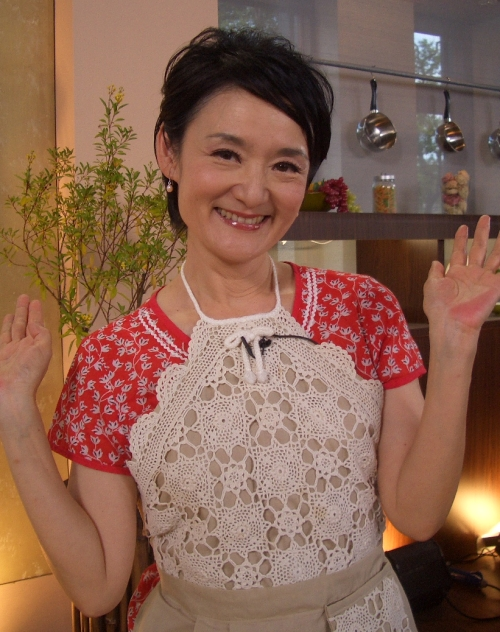
- Born: 22 February 1953 (age 73); Taiwan
- Occupation: actress
- Spouse: Chieh Ou-yang

Chinese name
- Traditional Chinese: 譚艾珍
- Simplified Chinese: 谭艾珍
Transcriptions
Standard Mandarin
- Hanyu Pinyin: Tán Àizhēn

Tan Ai-chen (Chinese: 譚艾珍; pinyin: Tán Àizhēnú) is a Taiwanese actress.

== Filmography ==
=== Television series ===
Year	English title	Original title	Role	Notes
2004	The Outsiders	鬥魚	Yu Hao's grandmother	
2006	The Magicians of Love	愛情魔髮師	Li Lian Nai Nai	
2008	Fated to Love You	命中注定我愛你	Ji Wang Zhen Zhu	
2011	Inborn Pair	真愛找麻煩	Ke Huang Rui Yin	
2012	Sweet Sweet Bodyguard	剩女保鏢	Shi Jin Xiu	
2013	Love Around	真愛黑白配	Chen Mei Li	
2014	Fabulous 30	女人30情定水舞間	Wu Su Mei	
2014	Say Again Yes I Do	再說一次我願意	Gao's Grandmother	
2015	Love or Spend	戀愛鄰距離	Chen Cai Ling	
2016	Swimming Battle	飛魚高校生	Gao Yan Ming Zhu	
