= Cindy Yen =

Taiwanese-American singer-songwriter (born 1986)

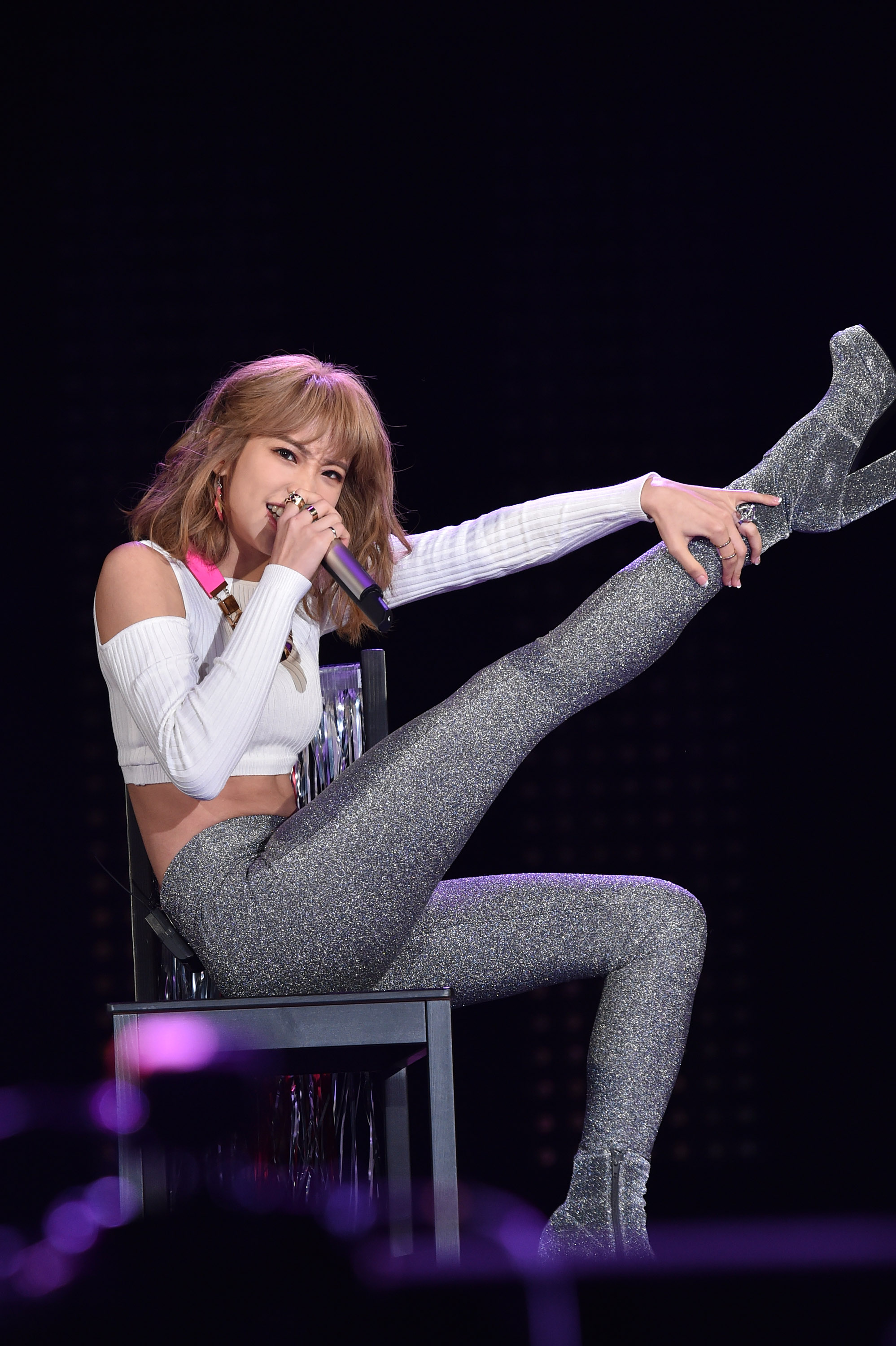
- Cindy Yen in 2017
- Born: Cindy Wu (吳欣雲); November 14, 1986 (age 39); Houston, Texas, U.S
- Occupations: Singer-songwriter, record producer, composer, actress
- Years active: 2009–present

Chinese name
- Traditional Chinese: 袁詠琳
- Simplified Chinese: 袁咏琳
Transcriptions
Standard Mandarin
- Hanyu Pinyin: Yuán Yǒnglín
- Musical career
- Origin: Taiwan
- Genres: Pop, R&B, Dance-pop
- Labels: JVR Music; Sony BMG

Cindy Yen (born Cindy Wu Chinese: 吳欣雲; 14 November 1986) is a Taiwanese-American singer-songwriter, actress, composer, and record producer. She is signed to JVR Music since 2009 and released her first debut album in October of same year entitled Cindy Yen, as well as her first song, "Sand Painting", a duet composed by her and sang along Jay Chou. She is known for R&B, soul, pop, classical, rock, acoustic folk, and hip-hop.

== Early life and education ==
Yen was born on 14 November 1986 in Houston, Texas. Her parents were divorced when she was 12, and solely was raised by her mother. As a child, she had interest in music especially the musical instrument, piano, which she calls her "best friend", and "part of what makes her happy". Yen attended Bellaire High School in Texas in 2004 and furthered to The University of Texas at Austin, where she majored in piano performance and broadcast journalism.

In 2008, Yen auditioned for American Idol in Dallas, but was eliminated by Randy Jackson. In the fall of 2008, she moved to Taiwan—her native land and proceeded into beauty pageantry though desired to be a musical artist. She won the 2008 Miss Chinatown Houston and the Miss Chinatown USA in 2009.

She was signed by Jay Chou into JVR Music as the first artist in February 2009.

== Career ==
=== Music ===
Within eight months of signing, Yen released her debut single, "Sand Painting", a duet she composed and sang along Jay Chou. The song received critical acclaim and topped Billboard China and KTV. The album was listed under Top 10 on the G-Music charts and top listened in KKBox Charts. In 2010, "Sand Painting" was rated as the top ten "most popular hit songs" in China by the Mandarin Web Original Composition Pop Music Charts. She later re-wrote the lyrics for its English version—"Another One Like You". Following the success of her song, she became a "featured girl" for FarEasTone, a Taiwan technological industry. On 30 October 2009, Yen released her self-titled album "Cindy Yen".

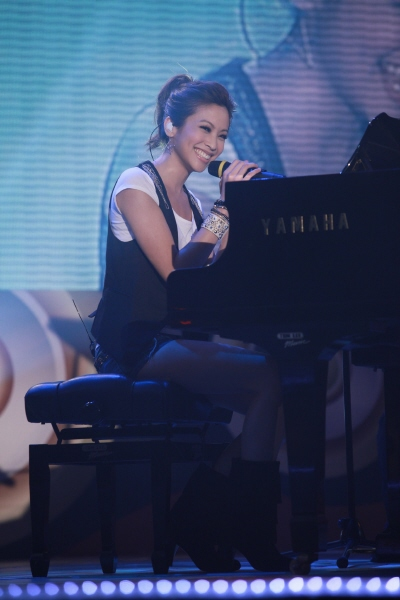
Cindy Yen as a guest performer in Hong Kong (2010)

Despite the challenges of western influence in Asian musical culture, her album was musically R&B, rock, hip-hop, pop rock, hard metal and Latin hip-hop dance beats and included hits including "Stupid Fish", "Very Traveling Love", "Singing a Song Because of Longing", and "Dancing With Threat." Since her debut, Yen opened her own mini-concert in Hong Kong. She was on tour with Jay Chou's 2010 "The Era" Concert Tour as a regular guest performer.

Yen released her second album, "2 Be Different" on September 29, 2011. In an interview with Razor TV, she said her album was to "empower women". Yen received the Best Stylistic New Artist at the Beijing MTV Super Awards in 2011, and the Best Single of the Year for "Trap". In 2012, she was awarded the Stylistic Breakthrough Artist of the Year at the Beijing Music Awards.

Yen released her third album, "Fight For Love" in 2015 with hits, "Come To Mami" and "Bad Boy". She later collaborated with Della Ding, a Taiwanese singer from B'in Music and released the song entitled "I Want Me" (我要我).

She is signed to Sony Music Entertainment Taiwan.

=== Acting ===
Yen first made a special guest appearance in the television drama series Pandamen (2010). On 5 July 2011, she starred as a supporting actress alongside Megan Lai and Yowei Lin in the TV series, Invaluable Treasure 1949. She has starred in the feature film, First Time (2012), Chinese reality show, Sisters Who Make Waves. She was eliminated at the fourth performance. Since then, she has featured in First Time (2015), Sophie in Youth Power (2015), Fiona in Swimming Battle (2016), Inference Notes (推理筆記; 2017), Jenny in Memory Love (2017), Secret Lover (愛情教會我的事 – 秘密情人; 2018), Between .(三明治女孩的逆袭; 2018).

== Influences ==
Yen's musical life was influenced by the Western culture, where she grew up. During her consent for recording her music, they were rejected as not suitable for Asia especially the Chinese music, which barely uses R&B and soul music genres.

== Legacy ==
In January 2010, Yen became TVBS' spokesperson for their "Lotus" charity event.

=== Awards and nominations ===
Year	Award	Category	Result	Ref
2010	Sprite Awards	Best New Artist and Duet of the Year	Won	
2010	Metro Radio Awards	Best New Hit Force Singer and Best New Hit Artist	Won	
2010	Golden Melody Awards	Meritorious Newcomer and the Most Popular Newcomer	Nominated	
2010	33rd Chinese Gold Songs Award	Most Potential Newcomer	Won	
2010	33rd Chinese Gold Songs Award	Best Mandarin Pop Song	Nominated	
2011	Beijing MTV Music Awards	Best New Stylistic Artist	Won	
2012	Beijing Pop Music Awards	Best Stylistic Breakthrough Artist of the Year	Won	
2012	Beijing Pop Music Awards	Best Single of the Year	Won	
2012	Hito Music Awards	Most Potential Female Artist	Won	

== Discography ==
Solo albums

- Cindy Yen (2009)
- 2 be different (2011)
- Fight For Love (2015)
- The Moment EP (2018)

Collaborations

- Smile (Featuring Jay Chou) (2012)
- What's Wrong (Featuring Jay Chou) (2014)
- I Want Me (Featuring Della Dang) (2020)

== Filmography ==
Television Drama

- American Idol (2008) (Season 7)
- Youth Power (2015)
- Swimming Battle (2016)
- Memory Love (2017)
- Sisters Who Make Waves (2020) (Season 1)
