= Lee Hsing-wen =

Taiwanese actor

- Born: 19 July 1967 (age 59); Taiwan
- Occupation: Actor
- Years active: 1986–present
- Spouse: Chen Shu-hui (m. 1993)
- Children: 2

Chinese name
- Traditional Chinese: 李興文
- Simplified Chinese: 李兴文
Transcriptions
Standard Mandarin
- Hanyu Pinyin: Lǐ Xīngwén
Southern Min
- Hokkien POJ: Lí Heng-bûn

Lee Hsing-wen (Chinese: 李興文; Pe̍h-ōe-jī: Lí Heng-bûn; born 19 July 1967) is a Taiwanese actor. He is best known for portraying military men in films and TV dramas. Lee's son Max is a YouTuber.

== Filmography ==
=== Films ===
Year	English title	Chinese title	Role	Notes
1986	Hanson, My Son	我兒漢生		
1986	Heaven Dragon, Earth Tiger	天龍地虎		
1987	Black Skin and White Teeth	黑皮與白牙		
1988	Classmate Party	隔壁班的男生		
1988	Classmate Party 2	同學會		
1988	Yes, Sir!	報告班長	Lin Weiyang	
1988	Edelweiss	白色酢漿草	Fu	
1988	Chopper and the Six Friends	菜刀与6個朋友		
1989	Bloody Killer	三點突破	Wu	
1989	Yes, Sir! 2	報告班長2	Zhuang Renjie	
1989	Lessons of the Playground	風雨操場	Lin Weike	
1989	First Date	第一次約會	You Fusheng	
1990	Whampoa Blues	壯志豪情		
1990	Young Soldier	少爺當大兵		
1990	Off to Success II	成功嶺2： 全面出擊		
1992	Dust of Angels	少年吔，安啦	Wen	
1993	Top Cool	想飛～傲空神鷹		
1996	Yes, Sir! 4	報告班長4:拂曉出擊	Lee Hsin-wen	
1997	Trust Me, You Can Make It!	報告班長－女兵報到	连长Lee	
2008	1895	一八九五	Lin Tianba	
2016	See You Again	奇幻同學會		

=== TV dramas (incomplete) ===
Year	English title	Chinese title	Role	Notes
1994	The Seven Heroes and Five Gallants	七俠五義	Chai Xinnong	
1996	Guan Gong	關公	Sun Quan	
2002	My MVP Valentine	MVP情人	Tung Chi-shen	
2004	The Unforgettable Memory	意難忘		
2006	The Spirit of Love	愛		
2007	Brown Sugar Macchiato	黑糖瑪奇朵		
2008	Hot Shot	籃球火		
2008	Mom's House	娘家		
2009	Night Market Life	夜市人生	Yeh Shih-hao	
2010	Rookies' Diary	新兵日記	Ting Hao	
2011	Father and Son	父與子	Yang Jo-shan	
2012	Feng Shui Family	風水世家	Lin Kuo-hui	
2014	Monga Women	艋舺的女人	Liu Wen-hui; Lin Ming-yi	
2016	Spring Flower	春花望露	Lee Tien-kuei	
2018-2020	Girl's Power	女兵日記/女力報到	Pan Yu-i	cameo

== Awards and nominations ==
Year	#	Award	Category	Work	Result
2001	36th	Golden Bell Awards	Best Supporting Actor	Rogue Professor	Nominated
2008	43rd	Golden Bell Awards	Best Supporting Actor	Mom's House	Nominated
