= Mandy Wei =

Taiwanese actress (born 1984)

- 魏蔓
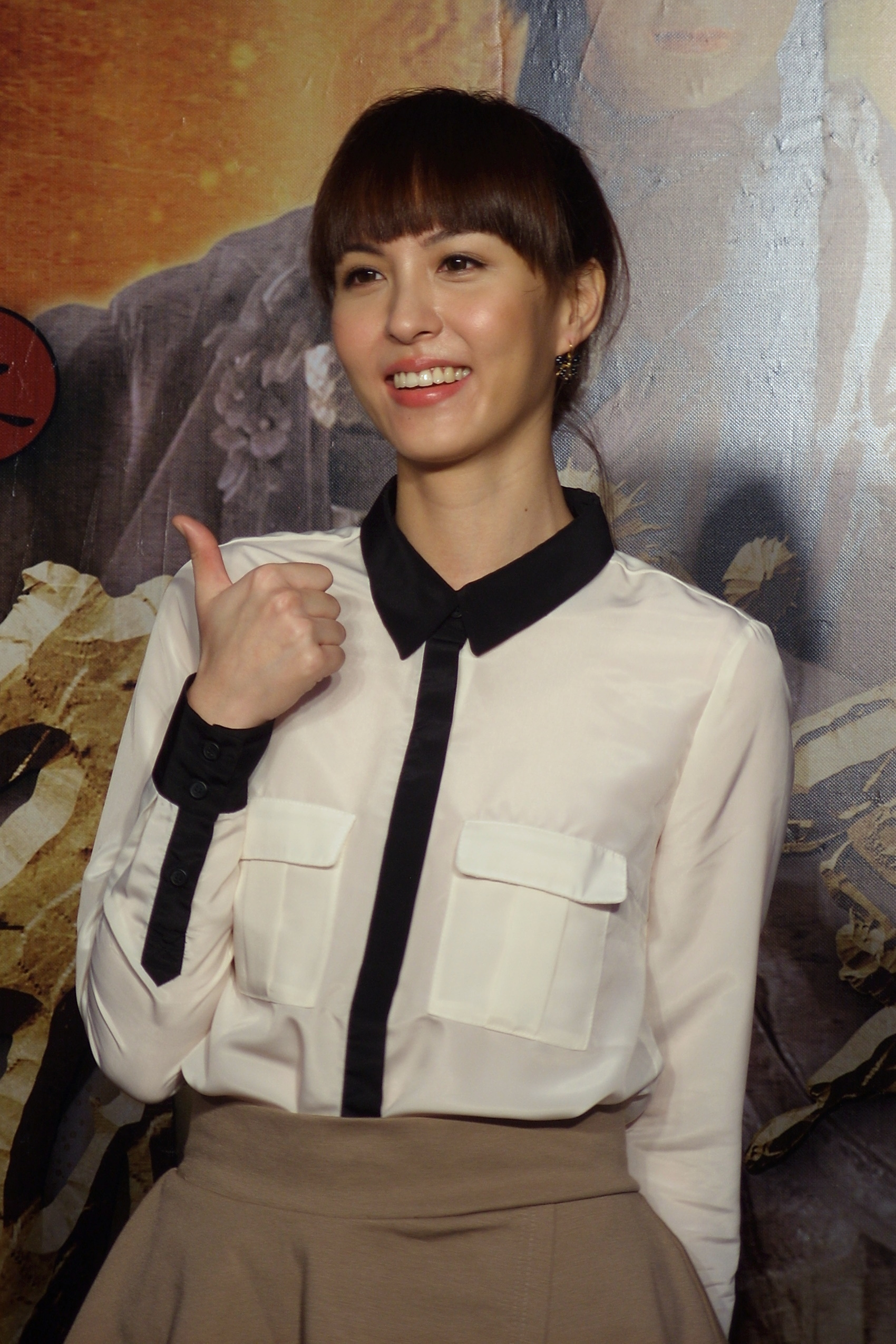
- Wei in 2017
- Born: 5 September 1984 (age 41); Taipei, Taiwan
- Education: Taipei Municipal Neihu Senior High School; Soochow University
- Occupations: Actress; model; host
- Years active: 2006-present
- Musical career
- Also known as: Wei Man

Mandy Wei (Chinese: 魏蔓; pinyin: Wèi Màn) is a Taiwanese actress, model and host. She started her career as a model and then as a MTV host before starting a career in acting. Wei attended Soochow University and speaks Mandarin, Taiwanese and English.

== Early life ==
Mandy Wei was born on September 5, 1984, in Taipei, Taiwan. She is the older of a two-child family, with a younger brother. She attended Taipei Municipal Neihu Senior High School and later Soochow University, majoring in International Business Trade. She has said she was, and showed images of herself being an overweight teen when growing up, weighing at 65 kg (143 lbs) at her heaviest. Her weight issue caused her to have low self-esteem problems during her teenage years. In her university years she decided to have a change in lifestyle by eating healthy and with daily exercise she was able to slim down to around 50 kg (110 lbs), which is the weight she has maintained.

== Career ==
=== Modeling ===
Wei started her career in 2006 as a lingerie and swimwear model. She had modeled for lingerie brand NuBra Taiwan and appeared on spreads for FHM Taiwan and GQ Taiwan magazine. After gaining exposure through her modeling work she was chosen to appear in Jay Chou's 2008 music video Snake Dance (蛇舞).

=== Hosting ===
In 2008, MTV Taiwan offered Wei a VJ position to host their entertainment news program and music program "MTV FUN Music" (MTV FUN音樂) where she interviewed local musical acts. In 2012, Wei became the host for entertainment gossip news website Apply Daily Taiwan.

=== Acting ===
Wei got her start in acting as a supporting character in the 2008 idol drama ToGetHer (愛就宅一起), playing "Luo Sha Sha" (羅莎莎), the leader of a university mean girls cliche, who picks on a homely girl played by Rainie Yang and is a huge fan of a celebrity idol Mars, played by Jiro Wang. She spent the next few years playing supporting characters in sometimes forgettable dramas and other times more popular dramas such as 2011 Material Queen (拜金女王).

Her big break came in 2012 when she was cast as "Dr. He Cai Rong" (何采蓉) in SETTV's weekly hit drama Love, Now (真愛趁現在). Originally a minor supporting character, her chemistry with second male lead Bobby Dou (竇智孔) proved to be a winning combination and soon her role was expanded to a main supporting role.

After gaining recognition from Love, Now, Wei was offered her first leading role to star in Sanlih's Sunday night drama Deja Vu (回到愛以前). She played "Xu Hai Lin" (徐海琳), a desperate women on the brink of suicide who gives up the love of the man she loves in order to bring him back to life. The drama started out weak coming in last place during its premiere episode, but soon gained an audience by coming in first place in its time-slot on every episode after that.

With the success of Deja Vu Sanlih offered Wei another leading role in their 2014 Sunday night drama Say Again Yes I Do (再說一次我願意), playing "Shu Xin Kui" (舒芯葵), a woman who marries a man she just met on a whelmed, played by Lin Yo Wei, only to find out she can't stand him and divorces him abruptly only to meet him a few years later and falls in love with him again. For this drama Wei decided to change her look by drastically cutting off her long hair to a near pixie cut. Her appearance was a drastic change from her previous projects, but the drama was another rating success, coming in first place in every episode during its time-slot.

In mid 2015, Wei once again collaborated with Sanlih by starring in a romantic comedy opposite Jasper Liu. Wei played "An Xi" (安希), a caring and independent woman who cannot stand injustice. Since Wei's hair had not grown out since Say Again Yes I Do concluded filming, she had to wear hair extensions to obtain a more youthful appearance since she had flash back scenes when her character was a university student.

In 2016, Wei played the lead in Sanlih Friday night drama, Swimming Battle, alongside Kingone Wang. Wei played "He Yu Die" (何雨鰈), a woman who lost her memories.

== Filmography ==
=== Television series ===
Year	Original title	English title	Role
2009	愛就宅一起	ToGetHer	Luo Sha Sha
2009	十年過後-轉筆高手	Ten Years Later, Great Writer	Ai Li Si
2011	拜金女王	Material Queen	Guo Xiao Qian
2011	田庄英雄	Local Hero	Luo Pei Zi
2011	萌的或然率	Meng's Probability	Mandy
2012	PM10-AM03	PM10-AM03	Wei Qi
2012	真愛趁現在	Love, Now	He Cai Rong
2013	回到愛以前	Deja Vu	Xu Hai Lin
2014	真愛配方	First Kiss	He Tian Tian
2014	再說一次我願意	Say Again Yes I Do	Shu Xin Kui
2015	他看她的第2眼	When I See You Again	An Xi
2016	飛魚高校生	Swimming Battle	He Yu Die
2017	櫻桃小丸子	Maruko TV Drama	Ying Xing Zi
2017	噗通噗通我愛你	Memory Love	Jin jia-en
2019		Brave to Love	
2019	美味滿閣	Sweet Family	Fang Yi Qian

=== Films ===
Year	Original title	English title	Role	Notes
2010	愛你一萬年	Love You 10,000 Years	Vivian	
2011	燃燒吧！歐吉桑	War Game 229	Jolin	
2012	女孩壞壞	Bad Girls	Jessica	
2014	極光之愛	Endless Nights in Aurora	Coco	
2016	湄公河行动	Operation Mekong	Fang Xing Wu's girlfriend	Cameo
2023	我的天堂城市	My Heavenly City	Claire	

=== As presenter ===
Year	English title	Original title	Notes
2008	MTV News		
2008	MTV Fun Music	MTV FUN音樂	
2009	MTV 2009 Gongliao Ocean Music Festival	MTV 2009貢寮海洋音樂季	
2010	Western Mediterranean Cruise	發現地中海	
2012	Apple Entertainment News	蘋果娛樂新聞	
2012	I Love The Man	我愛男子漢	

=== Music video appearances ===
Year	Song title	Details	Video
2008	So What (當我們開始旅行)	Singer(s): Judy Zhou 周定緯; Album: So What	Video on YouTube
2008	Snake Dance (蛇舞)	Singer(s): Jay Chou 周杰倫; Album: Capricorn (魔杰座)	Video on YouTube
2011	Noah's Ark (諾亞方舟)	Singer(s): Mayday 五月天; Album: The Second Round (第二人生)	Video on YouTube
2012	Fight For You (為你而戰)	Singer(s): Live Machine 機動現場; Album: Reset Activate (重生再起)	Video on YouTube
2012	Dad, I Love You (爸, 我愛你)	Singer(s): BASOL 爸說; Album:	Video on YouTube
2015	Fried Rice (炒飯)	Singer(s): N-Ray 胡恩瑞; Album: I Am N-Ray (我是胡恩瑞N-RAY)	Video on YouTube
2015	Warning (預告)	Singer(s): GJ 蔣卓嘉; Album: See You Again	Video on YouTube

== Awards and nominations ==
Year	Award	Category	Nominated work	Result
2013	2013 Sanlih Drama Awards	Viewers Choice Drama Award (with Yao Yuan Hao)	Deja Vu	Nominated
2013	2013 Sanlih Drama Awards	Best Actress Award	Deja Vu	Nominated
2013	2013 Sanlih Drama Awards	Best Screen Couple Award (with Yao Yuan Hao)	Deja Vu	Nominated
2013	2013 Sanlih Drama Awards	Best Kiss Award (with Yao Yuan Hao)	Deja Vu	Nominated
2013	2013 Sanlih Drama Awards	Best Crying Award (with Yao Yuan Hao)	Deja Vu	Nominated
2014	2014 Sanlih Drama Awards	Viewers Choice Drama Award (with Lin Yo Wei)	Say Again Yes I Do	Nominated
2014	2014 Sanlih Drama Awards	Best Actress Award	Say Again Yes I Do	Nominated
2014	2014 Sanlih Drama Awards	Best Kiss Award (with Lin Yo Wei)	Say Again Yes I Do	Nominated
2015	2015 Sanlih Drama Awards	Viewers Choice Drama Award (with Jasper Liu)	When I See You Again	Nominated
2015	2015 Sanlih Drama Awards	Best Actress Award	When I See You Again	Nominated
2015	2015 Sanlih Drama Awards	Best Screen Couple Award (with Jasper Liu)	When I See You Again	Nominated
2015	2015 Sanlih Drama Awards	Best Kiss Award (with Jasper Liu)	When I See You Again	Nominated
2015	2015 Sanlih Drama Awards	Best Selling S-Pop Magazine Award	When I See You Again	Nominated
2016	2016 Sanlih Drama Awards	Viewers Choice Drama Award (with Kingone Wang)	Swimming Battle	Nominated
2016	2016 Sanlih Drama Awards	Best Actress Award	Swimming Battle	Nominated
2016	2016 Sanlih Drama Awards	Best Screen Couple Award (with Kingone Wang)	Swimming Battle	Nominated
2016	2016 Sanlih Drama Awards	Best Kiss Award (with Kingone Wang)	Swimming Battle	Nominated
2016	2016 Sanlih Drama Awards	Best Crying Award (with Kingone Wang)	Swimming Battle	Nominated
