= Yao Yuan-hao =

Taiwanese actor and television host

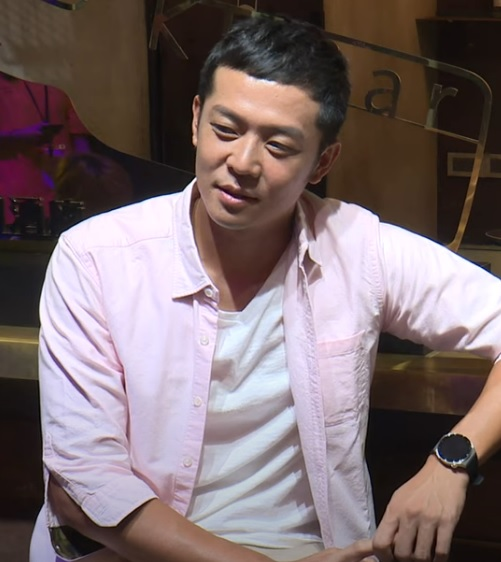
- Yao in August 2022
- Born: Teng Yong-lin (鄧詠麟); 19 April 1982 (age 44); Keelung, Taiwan
- Other name: How Yao
- Education: Pei Teh Industrial and Home Economics Vocational High School
- Occupations: Actor, television host
- Years active: 1999-present

Chinese name
- Traditional Chinese: 姚元浩
- Simplified Chinese: 姚元浩
- Hanyu Pinyin: Yáo Yuánhào

Teng Yong-lin (Chinese: 鄧詠麟; born 19 April 1982), known professionally as Yao Yuan-hao (Chinese: 姚元浩), is a Taiwanese actor and television host.

== Early life and career ==
Yao was born on April 19, 1982, in Keelung, Taiwan.

He started acting at around 16 years old in the television series Bandits and Angels (強盜與天使; 1999), directed by Wu Nien-jen, but only became active in 2002. He had his career breakthrough in FTV's 2011 series Rookies' Diary, which received high ratings. The production costs for the series was said to be up to two million TWD, and it also received strong support from the Ministry of Justice. Due to the high expectations, each cast member received training in taekwondo, kendo, and self-defense before shooting began in July.

Two years after Rookies' Diary, he starred opposite Cheryl Yang in Big Red Riding Hood. Screenwriter Su Limei (蘇麗媚) asked him to cut his hair similar to her favorite character in the Japanese manga Musashi no Ken, which would make him look more humorous.

In 2013, Yao starred in five television series, in four of which he portrayed "rich, handsome men". (Note: Translated from the Chinese language: 雖然都是演高富帥，但每部戲都有不同詮釋方法，反而更能讓自己揣摩不一樣的演出方式。)

== Personal life ==
Yao was involved in high profile relationships with actress-model Sonia Sui for 8 years until 2012 and singer Cyndi Wang for 4 years until 2016. Since 2018, he has been dating model Candy Wang.

Yao enjoys skateboarding, surfing, and extreme sports. He usually joins race marathons, including a 42-km marathon during the 'Tokyo Marathon' in February 2013; he was a sports brand ambassador at that time. He also entered the 2013 Taiwan International Surfing Competition.

== Philanthropy ==
In December 2011, he became the ambassador for the Independent Department of Justice held at the '1209 International Anti-Corruption Day', calling people together for the anti-corruption efforts to improve Taiwan. He also became a charity ambassador in Taiwan township schools, promoting traditional Chinese culture to children. In 2015 he volunteered to sell chocolates to raise money for young kids who have brain tumors.

== Filmography ==
=== Television series ===
Year	English title	Original title	Role	Notes
1999		強盜與天使－吳念真		
2002	Toast Boy's Kiss II The Ability of Love	吐司男之吻II愛情本事	Lin Yuan-hao	
2002	Sweet Lemon	甜檸檬之戀	Hao Hao	
2003		熟女慾望日記	Li Wei	
2004		老婆大人	Zhao Da-qiang	
2004		婆媳過招千百回	Haotian	Cameo
2005	Qingchun da zhen	青春達陣	He Shi-jie	
2006		艾曼紐要怎樣	Jason	Cameo
2007	Love Queen	戀愛女王	Rayman	Cameo
2007	The Sun's Daughter	太陽的女兒	Zhang Jun-wei	
2007	Just Give Me a Call	麻雀愛上鳳凰	Larry	
2008	Love Catcher	幸福捕手	Guang Qun	
2008	Your Home is My Home	歡喜來逗陣	George	Cameo
2009	PTV's Bolang	搏浪	He Hao-yang	
2010	Rookies' Diary	新兵日記	Sun An-bang	
2011	Justice Heroes	廉政英雄	Yao Shun-feng	
2012	Mulan On The Run	木蘭花	Jiang Jie	(Note: Began filming in 2009.)
2013	Big Red Riding Hood	大紅帽與小野狼	An De-feng	
2013	Flowers in Fog	花非花雾非雾	Geng Ruo-chen	
2013	The Diamond's Dream	一克拉梦想	Zhou Xuan	
2013	Deja Vu	回到愛以前	Lu Xi-wei	
2013	Three Exits To Love	幸福街第3號出口	Xu Li-yang	
2015	Youth Power	哇！陳怡君	Jiang Ye-qing	
2022	Special Case	双栖者	Yu Wenjun	Webseries

=== Film ===
Year	English title	Original title	Role	Notes
1999	Darkness and Light	黑暗之光	Lin	
2000		晴天娃娃		
2002	The Best of Times	美麗時光		
2009	Strike Out	三振		
2014	Lion Dancing	鐵獅玉玲瓏	Lin Shang-zhi	
2019	The 9th Precinct	第九分局	Police Officer	

=== Variety and reality show ===
Year	Title	Notes
	字軍東征	
	喜從天降	
2003	食全食美	
2004	娛樂星新聞	
2005	MIT台灣誌 (Make In Taiwan)	
2007	決戰衝浪勝地	
2010	Rookies' Show (新兵進行曲)	
2014	Show Winner (萬秀大勝利)	
2014	Love Travel & Life (元味好生活)	
2014	Feastival a la Stars (明星愛廚房)	
2020	All Star Sports Day (全明星運動會)	
2021−present	Just Eat (就是這味─玖浩吃)	
2022	Let's Open (來吧！營業中)	Season 1
2022	Mr. Player (好玩先生)	YouTube - episode: "Outdoor Life"

=== Music video appearances ===
Year	Title	Artist
2011	"Under The Same Sky"	Various artists - Rookies Music Diary TV Original Soundtrack
2011	"Everything I Do"	SD5

== Discography ==
=== Singles ===
Year	Title	Album
2010	"三振"	三振 STRIKE OUT電影原聲帶
2010	"晴天"	三振 STRIKE OUT電影原聲帶
2011	"Under The Same Sky"	Rookies Music Diary TV Original Soundtrack
2011	"Everything I Do"	SD5: 同名專輯

== Awards and nominations ==
Year	Award	Category	Nominated work	Result
2013	2nd Sanlih Drama Awards	Best Actor	Deja Vu	Nominated
2013	2nd Sanlih Drama Awards	Best Screen Couple (with Mandy Wei)	Deja Vu	Nominated
2013	2nd Sanlih Drama Awards	Best Kiss (with Mandy Wei)	Deja Vu	Nominated
2013	2nd Sanlih Drama Awards	Best Sentimental Performance (with Mandy Wei)	Deja Vu	Nominated
2013	2nd Sanlih Drama Awards	Sina Weibo Popularity Award	Deja Vu	Nominated
2013	2nd Sanlih Drama Awards	Popularity Award (overseas)	Deja Vu	Nominated
