= Big Red Riding Hood =

- Poster
- 大紅帽與小野狼
- Genre: Romance, Comedy
- Created by: Su Limei (蘇麗媚)
- Written by: Du Xinyi (杜欣怡); Lu Yihua(陸亦華); Jian Youping(簡佑玶); Sun Xiangyun (孫向妘)
- Directed by: Chen Rong-hui (陳戎暉)
- Starring: Cheryl Yang, Yao Yuan Hao
- Opening theme: "Fantasy Paradise" by A-Fu
- Ending theme: "Me&U" by A-Fu
- Country of origin: Republic of China (Taiwan)
- Original language: Mandarin
- No. of series: 1
- No. of episodes: 16

Production
- Producer: Lin Xiaojing (林曉菁)
- Running time: 105 minutes (including commercials)
- Production companies: Sanlih E-Television; Dreamland Productions

Original release
- Network: TTV
- Release: 28 February – 13 June 2013

Big Red Riding Hood (Chinese: 大紅帽與小野狼) is a 2013 Taiwanese idol romantic-comedy television series. Produced by Sanlih E-Television and Dreamland Productions, it stars Cheryl Yang as the female main lead and Yao Yuan Hao as the male lead. The series first aired on February 28, 2013 on TTV after the Love Me or Leave Me series.

== Plot ==
Wu Zhang Mei (Cheryl Yang) is a woman who grew up with a strong sense of justice. One day, her childhood friend and classmate An De Feng (Yao Yuan Hao) returns to their hometown after leaving suddenly when they were young. As An De Feng has come back with revenge in mind because of a misunderstanding, both meet up again to clear things up and patch their friendship.

== Cast ==
The cast of Big Red Riding Hood includes the following:

Main cast

- Cheryl Yang as Wu Zhang Mei (吳長鎂)
- Yao Yuan Hao as An De Feng (安德風)
- Tender Huang as Lei Yu Luo (雷宇洛) / Lei Yu Xuan (雷宇玄)
- Li Chen Xiang (李辰翔) as Bryant
- Adriene Lin as Lin Ya Ting (林雅婷)

Minor cast

- Peng Man Lin (彭曼凌) as young Wu Zhang Mei
- Su Pin Jie (蘇品杰) as young An De Feng
- Wang Meng Lin (王夢麟) as Zhang Bo Min (張伯民)
- Ding Qiang (丁強) as An Tu Sheng (安圖昇)
- Zhu De Gang as Liu Yi Zong (劉一宗)
- Li Yi Jin as Tang Yong Xin (唐詠心)
- Akio Chen as Abula (阿不拉)
- Huang Tai An as Manager Dai (戴總)
- Chen You Fang as Zhen Ni (珍妮姐)
- Chen Yan Zhuang (壯壯/陳彥壯) as Bai Ma (百碼)
- Zeng Wei Hao (曾威豪) as Ma Li Ha (馬粒蛤)
- Haung Ya Min (黃雅珉) as An Jie (安潔)
- Su Yi Jing (蘇憶菁) as Qu Yu Fen (吳羽芬)
- Lang Tsu-yun (郎祖筠) as Wang Dao Nan (王道南)
- Tom Price (白梓軒) as Zi Xuan (子煊)
- Zhang Li Lei (張立蕾) as Miss Beauty
- Chris Wang as physician (Episode 3)

=== Casting ===
Cheryl Yang had to play a shy woman for the series. She last acted in the 2012 series Once Upon a Love with Sunny Wang and Matt Wu.

== Broadcast ==
Network	Country/Location	Airing Date	Timeslot
TTV	Taiwan	February 28, 2013	Thursdays, 10pm to 11:45pm
Eastern Integrated Taiwan	Taiwan	March 1, 2013	Fridays, 10pm to 11:45pm
SETTV	Taiwan	March 1, 2013	Fridays, 8:00pm to 9:45pm
E City	Singapore	March 24, 2013	Sundays, 10pm to 11:45pm
TVB Jade	Hong Kong	September 18, 2014	Mondays to Fridays, 7:30am to 8:30am
Astro Shuang Xing	Malaysia	December 5, 2014	Fridays, 12:00pm to 2:00pm

== Soundtrack ==
Big Red Riding Hood

Soundtrack album by Various Artists
- Released: May 24, 2013
- Genre: Mandopop
- Language: Mandarin
- Label: Forward Music Taiwan

The Big Red Riding Hood OST EP (大紅帽與小野狼 偶像劇音樂選輯 (EP)) CD was released on May 24, 2013 by various artists under Forward Music Taiwan. It contains four songs. The opening theme song, "Fantasy Paradise" by A-fu was not included in the OST, while the ending theme song, "Me&U" by A-fu was the first track of the EP.

=== Track listing ===
No.	Title	Lyrics	Music	Singer	Length
1.	"Me & U"	A-fu	A-fu, 官錠AL	A-fu	3:18
2.	"Powerless" (無能為力)	A Guai (阿怪)	Vincent Tan	Chen Daoxian (陳道賢)	3:59
3.	"Hái Shì Shī Mián" (還是失眠)	官錠AL	Huáng Wén Xuān (黃文萱)	Lù Zhèn Xī (陸侲曦)	3:48
4.	"Where is the love?"	A-fu	A-fu	A-fu

=== Insert Songs ===
The following lists the songs that were inserted into the drama, but not included in the original soundtrack. It includes the opening song "Fantasy Paradise" by A-fu.

No.	Title	Lyrics	Music	Singer	Length
1.	"Fantasy Paradise"	A-fu	A-fu, 官錠AL	A-fu
2.	"Beloved" (良人)	Yáng Jǐn Wéi (楊謹維)	A-fu	A-fu

== Episode ratings ==
The viewers' survey was conducted by AGB Nielsen.

Episode	Air Date	Episode Title	Ratings
01	February 28, 2013	因為愛 我們才有勇氣和力量保護別人…	0.31
02	March 7, 2013	和著隱形淚水的微笑 長鎂心中充滿愛	0.26
03	March 14, 2013	當妳覺得累的時候， 就由我來保護你……	0.30
04	March 21, 2013	不要逃避我了， 從現在開始我要真心待妳	0.23
05	March 28, 2013	嗨，吳腸粉，我真的回來了！	0.19
06	April 4, 2013	是鬼？是人？ 雷雷…雷宇洛回來了？	0.38
07	April 4, 2013	我會把她從你身邊奪走！	0.26
08	April 18, 2013	長鎂，讓我代替宇洛照顧妳	0.23
09	April 25, 2013	宇玄：長鎂，妳這輩子 只能為我哥而活！	0.17
10	May 2, 2013	安德風：我要全世界知道 長鎂是我女友	0.16
11	May 9, 2013	長鎂靜靜地把頭靠在宇玄肩上……	0.21
12	May 16, 2013	安德風，我不會跟你訂婚的	0.12
13	May 23, 2013	德風：長鎂別走， 別丟下我一個人！	0.12
14	May 30, 2013	什麼事都可以， 唯獨吳長鎂，我不讓	0.11
15	June 6, 2013	德風：我要預防宇玄 來誘拐我老婆…	0.12
16	June 13, 2013	德風和長鎂就要啾… 但是…他又出現了…	0.12
Average Ratings			0.21
