= Yang Li-yin =

Taiwanese actress

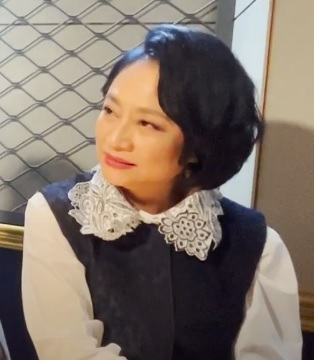
- Yang in November 2022
- Born: January 10, 1963 (age 63); Taiwan
- Education: National Taiwan College of Performing Arts
- Occupation: Actress
- Years active: 1981–present
- Spouse: Chen Hwai-en (m. 1990)
- Children: 3

Chinese name
- Traditional Chinese: 楊麗音
- Simplified Chinese: 杨丽音
- Hanyu Pinyin: Yáng Lìyīn

Yang Li-yin (born 10 January 1963) is a Taiwanese actress. She won the Golden Bell Award for Best Actress in 2006.

Best known for her roles on television, Yang has also appeared in films and on stage.

== Selected filmography ==
- Taipei Story (1985)
- The Puppetmaster (1993)
- Island Etude (2006)
- Rookies' Diary (2010–11)
- Material Queen (2011)
- Inborn Pair (2011–12)
- Miss Rose (2012)
- Lady Maid Maid (2012–13)
- King Flower (2013)
- Just You (2013)
- Endless Nights in Aurora (2014)
- Tie the Knot (2014)
- Say Again Yes I Do (2014–15)
- Love or Spend (2015–16)
- The Love Song (2016)
- Love By Design (2016)
- Swimming Battle (2016)
- A Leg (2020)
- The Falls (2021)
- Coo-Coo 043 (2022)
- Way Back Home (2023)
- A Wonderful Journey (2024)
