= Deja Vu (TV series) =

Taiwanese romance drama television series

- Promo poster
- Also known as: Return to Past Love, Hui Dao Ai Yi Qian, 回到愛以前
- 回到愛以前
- Genre: Romance
- Created by: Sanlih E-Television
- Written by: Hung Li Yan 洪立妍; Lan Jing Jie 蘭井街
- Directed by: Wang Ming Tai 王明台; Hao Xin Xiang 郝心翔
- Starring: Yao Yuan Hao 姚元浩; Mandy Wei 魏蔓; Jenna Wang 王思平; Nylon Chen 陳乃榮; Yang Zhen 楊鎮
- Opening theme: "Beautiful 美麗" by Dawen Wang 王大文
- Ending theme: "Let's Not Be Friends After a Breakup 分手後不要做朋友" by Rachel Liang 梁文音
- Country of origin: Taiwan
- Original language: Mandarin
- No. of series: 1
- No. of episodes: 22

Production
- Producer: An Jing Hong 安景鴻
- Production location: Taiwan
- Running time: 90 minutes
- Production companies: Sanlih E-Television 三立電視; TM Brothers Media Co. Ltd 天億兄弟影音傳媒股份有限公司

Original release
- Network: TTV
- Release: 3 November 2013 – 30 March 2014

Related
- Love Around 真愛黑白配; Fall in Love with Me 愛上兩個我

Deja Vu (Chinese: 回到愛以前; pinyin: Hui Dao Ai Yi Qian) is a 2013 Taiwanese romance drama series created by Sanlih. It stars Yao Yuan Hao and Mandy Wei in the lead roles, with Wang Si Ping and Yang Zhen as second leads. The Chinese title of the drama literally translates to "return to past love". Filming began on 12 October 2013 and ended on 8 March 2014. The first episode aired on Sanlih's TTV channel on 3 November 2013, taking over Love Around's time slot. The final episode of the 22-episode series aired on 30 March 2014.

== Synopsis ==
Xu Hai Lin is a talented ballerina. She meets Lu Xi Wei, a wealthy businessman, when she saves his life from a fire. She looks after him during his recovery, and the two fall in love; Xi Wei proposes marriage. Hai Lin's life couldn't be happier, as she is about to marry the man she loves, and she finds out she's pregnant with his child. However, a car crash kills her fiancé, and causes her to miscarry. While contemplating suicide, she meets a mysterious man who offers to give Hai Lin a second chance by allowing her to go back when she first met Xi Wei. Wanting to bring her beloved back, she takes the offer, but because things do not happen exactly as they did the first time she saved Xi Wei, he ends up falling in love with her older half-sister.

Hai Lin tries numerous ways to get Xi Wei to fall in love with her again, but it always ends in heartbreak for her. Until Xi Wei encounters a setback, Hai Lin is the only one still by his side. Only then does he realize her love for him. Xi Wei falls for Hai Lin once more, and the couple is set to be married again, when this time it is Hai Lin who dies from an accident. Xi Wei also meets the mysterious stranger and receives an offer to bring Hai Lin back to life. The two are finally married, but in order to get Hai Lin back, Xi Wei has to give up years of his life and is thus aged.

== Cast and characters ==
=== Main ===
- Mandy Wei 魏蔓 as Xu Hai Lin 徐海琳
- Yao Yuan Hao 姚元浩 as Lu Xi Wei 陸希唯
- Jenna Wang 王思平 as Xu You Xi 徐又熙
- Nylon Chen 陳乃榮 as Fang Qi Xiang
- Yang Zhen 楊鎮 as Lu Xiang Kai 陸向凱

=== Supporting ===
- Guan Jin Zong 管謹宗 as Lu Bai Feng 陸百峰
- Chen You Fang 陳幼芳 as Lin Yu Hua 林玉華
- Fu Lei 傅雷 as Xu Zhen Ji 徐振基
- Chien Te-men 乾德門 as Lu Da Qi 陸大器
- Lin Xiu Jun 林秀君 as Wang Mei Hui 王惠美
- Zhang Xi En 張熙恩 as Liu Fei Fei 劉菲菲
- Wang Jia Liang 王家梁 as Zheng Ya Li 鄭亞力
- Paul Hsu 許騰方 as Tony
- Mei Xian Zhi 梅賢治 as Xiao Q 小Q
- Yao Dai Wei 姚黛瑋 as Qiao Qi 喬琪
- Chen Ruo Ping 陳若萍 as Fang Ruo Mei 方若梅

== Soundtrack ==
Deja Vu Original TV Soundtrack (OST)

Soundtrack album by Various artists
- Released: 17 January 2014
- Genre: Mandopop
- Language: Mandarin
- Label: Universal Music (TW)

The Deja Vu Original TV Soundtrack (OST) (回到愛以前 電視情歌合輯), which contains fourteen songs performed by various artists, was released on 17 January 2014 under Universal Music (TW). The opening theme is track 1, "Beautiful 美麗" by Dawen Wang 王大文, while the closing theme is track 2, "Let's Not Be Friends After Breaking Up 分手後不要做朋友" by Rachel Liang 梁文音.

=== Track listing ===
No.	Title	Singer(s)	Length
1.	"Beautiful" (美麗)	Dawen Wang 王大文	4:01
2.	"Let's Not Be Friends After Breaking Up" (分手後不要做朋友)	Rachel Liang 梁文音	4:23
3.	"Don't Back Off" (不要撤退)	Jane Huang 黃美珍	4:06
4.	"Stranger?" (變成陌生人)	Cyndi Wang 王心凌	4:44
6.	"How Do You Know?" (你怎麼知道)	Vanness Wu 吳建豪	4:04
7.	"What Is Love?" (愛是什麼)	Rachel Liang 梁文音	3:54
8.	"Beautiful (Turn Back Time version)" (美麗 (時光倒流版))	Instrumental	4:01
9.	"Beautiful (Happiness version)" (美麗 (幸福萌芽版))	Instrumental	4:01
10.	"Let's Not Be Friends After Breaking Up (Bliss edition)" (分手後不要做朋友 (抒情Bliss版))	Instrumental	4:23
11.	"Let's Not Be Friends After Breaking Up (Crystal edition)" (分手後不要做朋友 (沉靜水晶版))	Instrumental	4:23
12.	"Hello (Mischievous Spark version)" (你好 (調皮火花版))	Instrumental	3:56
13.	"Let's Work It Out (Fantasy Humor version)" (練習愛情 (奇幻幽默版))	Instrumental	5:17
14.	"Acid Rain (Intricate Love version)" (酸雨 (錯綜愛戀版))	Instrumental	4:38

== Broadcast ==
Deja Vu originally aired on TTV on 3 November 2013.

Channel	Country	Airing Date	Timeslot
TTV HD	Taiwan	3 November 2013	Sunday 10:00 PM
SETTV	Taiwan	9 November 2013	Saturday 10:00 PM
ETTV	Taiwan	10 November 2013	Sunday 8:30 PM
Astro	Malaysia	21 April 2014	Monday to Friday 10:30 PM

== Episode ratings ==
Deja Vu premiered with weak ratings, coming in last in its time slot. Beginning with episode two, it ranked in first place in its time slot, through to the final episode. A viewer survey was conducted by AGB Nielsen, with an audience survey range starting at four years of age.

Air Date	Episode	Title	Average Ratings	Rank
3 November 2013	1	"Bliss, Return to Past Love"; Bliss，回到愛以前	0.86	3
10 November 2013	2	"Second World of Love, More Love" 第二世的愛，更愛	1.04	1
17 November 2013	3	"I Trust My Workers!" 我相信我的員工！	1.35	1
24 November 2013	4	"Past Lover?" 上輩子的情人？	1.34	1
1 December 2013	5	"For My One and Only Love" 為了唯一的愛	1.28	1
8 December 2013	6	"Everything Has Only Just Begun!" 原來一切才正要開始！	1.70	1
15 December 2013	7	"My Bliss Bracelet!" 我的Bliss手鍊！	2.10	1
22 December 2013	8	"Lucky Girl?" 幸運的女孩？	2.11	1
29 December 2013	9	"Your Life Rests in Your Hands!" 妳的人生，掌握在妳手上！	2.02	1
5 January 2014	10	"Originally, What Saved Me Was You!" 原來，救我的人是妳！	2.58	1
12 January 2014	11	"Return Your Happiness Back to You!" 把妳的幸福還給妳！	2.53	1
19 January 2014	12	"You Are My Lu Xi Wei! 你是我的陸希唯！	2.05	1
26 January 2014	13	"You Are My Ex-boyfriend" 你就是我的前男友	2.55	1
2 February 2014	14	"Inseparable, Respect the Courage to Love" 離不開，就鼓起勇氣愛！	1.84	1
9 February 2014	15	"Helen, I Love You!" 海琳，我愛妳！	2.47	1
16 February 2014	16	"Hold on to the Hands of Fate!" 把妳從命運手裡搶回來！	1.84	1
23 February 2014	17	"Welcome to the Border of Life and Death" 歡迎，來到生與死的交界。	1.91	1
2 March 2014	18	"Make You Fall in Love with Me" 讓妳重新愛上我	1.62	1
9 March 2014	19	"Don't Go, Okay?" 不要走好嗎？	1.39	1
16 March 2014	20	"Did You Fall in Love with Lu Xi Wei?" 妳愛上陸希唯了嗎？	1.34	1
23 March 2014	21	"No One Can Take Away Love" 沒有人能搶走的愛	1.21	1
30 March 2014	22	"What I Love Is Your Soul" 我愛的，是你的靈魂	1.69	1
Average ratings			1.76	

== Awards and nominations ==
Year	Ceremony	Category	Nominee	Result
2013	2013 Sanlih Drama Awards 華劇大賞	Best Actor	Yao Yuan Hao	Nominated
2013	2013 Sanlih Drama Awards 華劇大賞	Best Actress	Mandy Wei	Nominated
2013	2013 Sanlih Drama Awards 華劇大賞	Best Screen Couple	Yao Yuan Hao & Mandy Wei	Nominated
2013	2013 Sanlih Drama Awards 華劇大賞	Best Kiss	Yao Yuan Hao & Mandy Wei	Nominated
2013	2013 Sanlih Drama Awards 華劇大賞	Best Crying	Yao Yuan Hao & Mandy Wei	Nominated
2013	2013 Sanlih Drama Awards 華劇大賞	Most Popular Overseas	Yao Yuan Hao	Nominated
2013	2013 Sanlih Drama Awards 華劇大賞	Weibo Popularity Award	Yao Yuan Hao	Nominated
2013	2013 Sanlih Drama Awards 華劇大賞	Viewers Choice Drama Award	Deja Vu	Nominated

== Remake ==
- Thailand: Deja Vu / Ruk Yon Welah, เดจาวู OneHD31 (2020)
