= Michael Zhang =

- Born: China
- Education: MIT, Tsinghua University
- Scientific career
- Fields: Information Systems, Marketing, Economics
- Workplaces: Tsinghua University, Chinese University of Hong Kong, Hong Kong University of Science and Technology, MIT, Peking University, ZEW
- Thesis: Tapping into the pulse of the market : Essays on marketing implications of information flows (2006)
- Doctoral advisor: Erik Brynjolfsson
- Other academic advisors: Erik Brynjolfsson, John Little (academic), Chris Dellarocas

Michael Zhang (Zhang Xiaoquan) is the Wei Lun Chair Professor of Business AI at the Chinese University of Hong Kong. He was previously the Irwin and Joan Jacobs Chair Professor at the School of Economics and Management, Tsinghua University. He served as the Associate Dean of Innovation and Impact at the Business School, Chinese University of Hong Kong (CUHK). He served as a senior editor at Information Systems Research and an associate editor at Management Science. He is now a senior editor at MIS Quarterly.

== Biography ==
He is a graduate of MIT Sloan School of Management and the Tsinghua University. He has a PhD degree in Management, a Master of Science degree in Management, a Bachelor of Arts degree in English, and a Bachelor of Engineering degree in Computer Science.

Prior to joining the academia, he worked as a financial analyst and an international marketing manager.

His research topics are related to: (1) IT in financial markets: artificial intelligence, disclosure, governance; (2) Online advertising: word-of-mouth, position auctions; (3) Social media: incentives and biases, information environment for managers/investors; and (4) Information goods: pricing, innovation incentives, long tail.

His research works have been accepted by prestigious journals such as American Economic Review, Marketing Science, Management Science (journal), Management Information Systems Quarterly, Information Systems Research, and Journal of Marketing.

Michael Zhang was a co-founder of the MIT BBS, an online social network for Chinese-speaking people in the US.

He co-founded Super Quantum Capital Management, a quantitative hedge fund in China.
