= Hope Lin =

Taiwanese actress

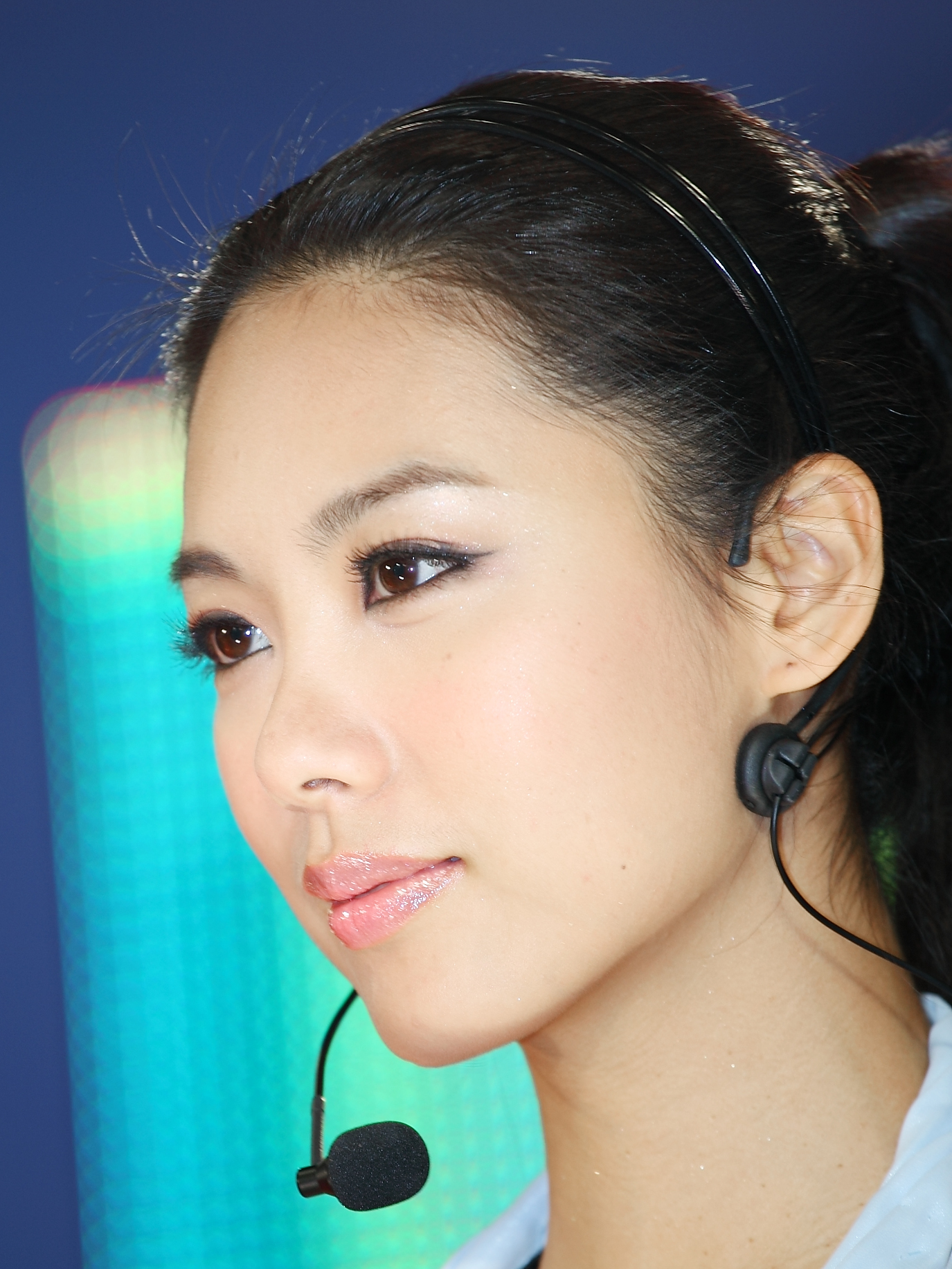
- Born: 17 February 1981 (age 45); Pingtung City, Pingtung County, Taiwan
- Occupation: actress

Hope Lin (Chinese: 林可彤; pinyin: Lín Kětóng) is a Taiwanese actress.

== Filmography ==
=== Television series ===
Year	English title	Original title	Role	Notes
2013	Amour et Pâtisserie	沒有名字的甜點店	Xiao Yang	
2014	Fall in Love with Me	愛上兩個我	Helen Cao	
2016	Better Man	我的極品男友	Yao You Zhen	
2016	Behind Your Smile			
2017	Ms. GoodLone			
2019	Deja Vu			
