= Sanlih E-Television =

Cable TV network operated in Taiwan

- Type: Nationwide cable TV network
- Branding: SET
- First air date: September 1993; 32 years ago
- Founded: May 1993; 32 years ago
- Broadcast area: Taiwan
- Official website: settv.com.tw

Sanlih E-Television
- Traditional Chinese: 三立電視
Transcriptions
Standard Mandarin
- Hanyu Pinyin: Sānlì Diànshì
Southern Min
- Hokkien POJ: Saⁿ-li̍p Tiān-sī

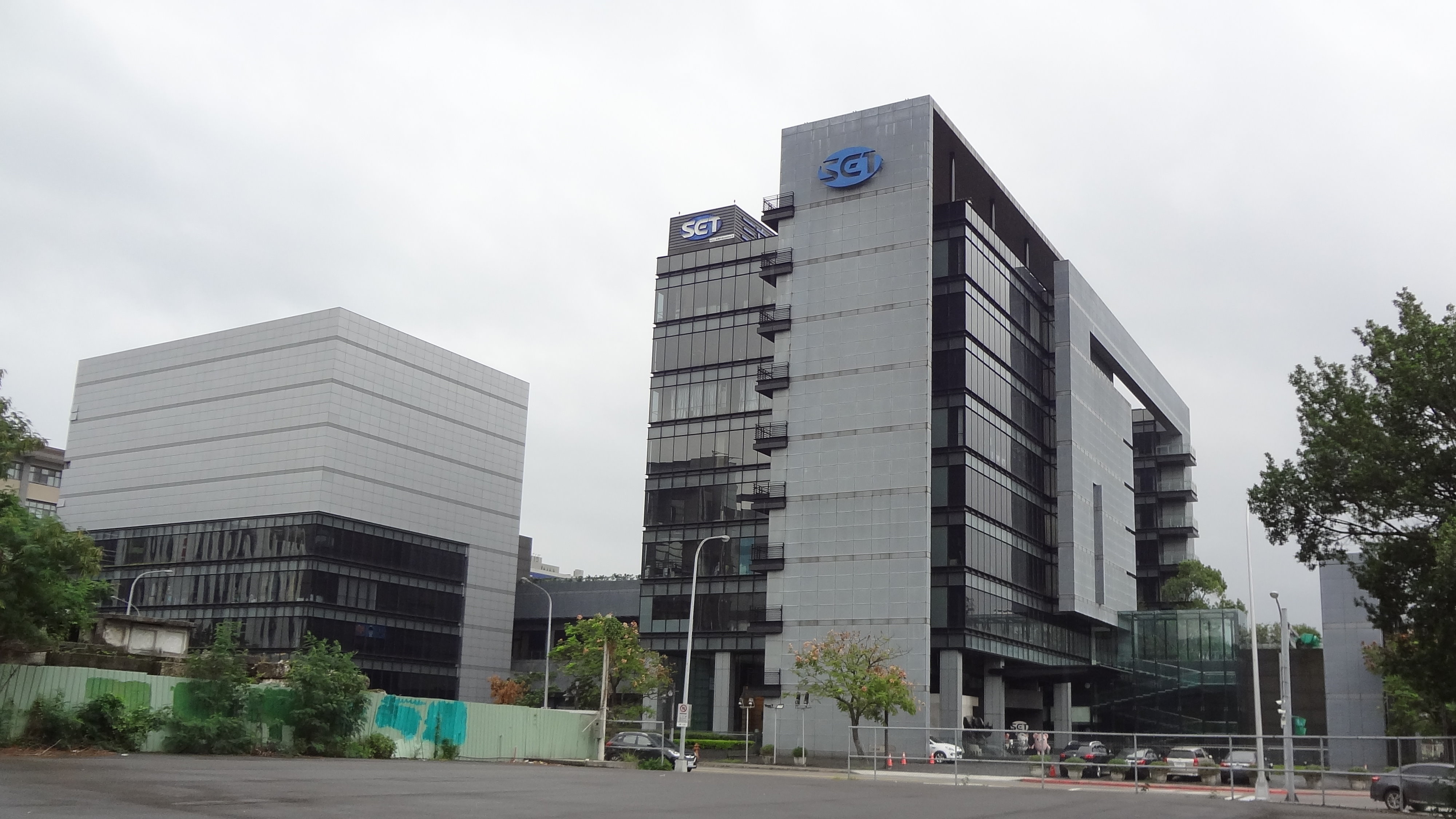
SETTV building in Neihu, Taipei

Sanlih Entertainment Television or Sanlih E-Television (SET; Chinese: 三立電視) is a Taiwanese nationwide cable TV network founded in May 1993. It also produces Taiwanese drama that are broadcast on free-to-air channels like Taiwan Television (TTV).

In terms of political orientation, Sanlih leans heavily towards the Pan-Green Coalition.

== History ==
The Sanlih media group was founded by Lin Kun-hai, his wife Lin Chang-Hsiu, and her brother Chang Rong-hua in 1983, producing videos of Taiwanese Hokkien music and variety programs with entertainers such as Chu Ke-liang. The network's name, literally meaning "three establishments", refers to the three cofounders of the company. Sanlih quickly became successful as broadcasting restrictions during the martial law period limited the usage of non-Mandarin languages on television. However, the introduction of cable television led to a proliferation of unlicensed operators that would broadcast Sanlih videos on their own channels without permission, leading to the group setting up its own channel in 1993. To appeal to a broader, national base, Sanlih launched the Mandarin-language City Channel in 1996 and rebranded to SET-N (standing for "national" and "news") in 1997, helping it secure funding from political advertisements during the elections held in both years as multiparty democracy became a reality in Taiwan.

== SET channels ==
SET currently offers eight subsidiary channels:

- SET International (began airing March 2000)
- SET Taiwan (began airing December 1996)
- SET News (began airing March 1998)
- SET Metro (began airing September 1995)
- SET Drama (began airing December 1996, relaunched June 2013)
- SET iNews (began airing May 2011)
- SET Variety (began airing June 2012)
- MTV Taiwan (being operated by Sanlih since November 2011)

== Productions ==
- SET Taiwan Productions Drama
- SET Metro Productions Drama

== See also ==
- List of dramas broadcast by Sanlih E-Television
- List of Taiwanese television series
- Sanlih Drama Awards
- SET News
