= Love, Now =

Taiwanese television series

- Promotional poster
- Also known as: Love While Now
- 真愛趁現在
- Genre: Romance, Comedy
- Created by: Sanlih E-Television
- Written by: Shao Hui Ting 邵慧婷; Lín Pei Yu 林珮瑜; Zheng Ying Min 鄭英敏; Huang Xiang Min 黃湘玟
- Directed by: Lian Li Chun 連春利
- Starring: Annie Chen 陳庭妮; George Hu 胡宇威
- Opening theme: Go Jogging 一起去跑步 by Cosmic Man
- Ending theme: Temporary Boyfriend 暫時的男朋友 by Yen-J
- Country of origin: Taiwan
- Original language: Mandarin
- No. of series: 1
- No. of episodes: 72

Production
- Producers: Fang Xiaoren 方孝仁; Rong Junyi 戎俊義
- Production locations: Taiwan; Philippines
- Running time: 47 minutes
- Production companies: Sanlih E-Television; Golden Bloom Production Co., Ltd. 金牌風華影像製作公司

Original release
- Network: SETTV
- Release: 31 October 2012 – 5 March 2013

Related
- Gung Hay Fat Choy 我們發財了; A Hint of You 美味的想念

Love, Now (Chinese: 真愛趁現在; pinyin: Zhen Ai Chen Xian Zai) is a 2012 to 2013 Taiwanese modern romance comedy drama television series created and developed by SETTV. It stars Annie Chen and George Hu as the main leads, with Bobby Dou, Harry Chang from Taiwanese band Da Mouth and Vivi Lee as the supporting leads. The drama is about regular everyday life, especially finding love while juggling a busy career, and going through and overcoming problems together.

Written and produced from the same team as Sanlih's 2011 to 2012 hit romance drama Inborn Pair. Filming began on September 16, 2012 and finished on March 3, 2013. It began airing on SETTV ETTV on October 31, 2012 weekly from Monday to Thursday. Each episode has a 45-minute running time. The final episode aired on March 5, 2013 with 72 episodes total, 8 less than the originally intended 80 episodes. This is the first Sanlih drama that has overseas filming.

== Synopsis ==
Yang Yi Ru is a workaholic who never had time to take a break. Her family and friends decide to pull a prank on her to slow her down. They con her into believing she only had six months to live, then pack her off to a vacation spot to clear her mind. She spends her first day on a sunny beach lamenting to a stranger that she wished she had the time to meet Mr. Right, get married, and have kids. Unbeknownst to her, the stranger was a man from her past who was in love with her when they met years ago. He proposes to her the next day and she marries him, but when the prank is revealed, her new husband feels cheated and unleashes his wrath on her.

== Plot summary ==
Lan Shi-de is a tall, handsome and successful young man who manages his family bathroom fixture business, but he is also cold, impatient, and hot-tempered. He hates being deceived, because he was betrayed by former employees in the past, so he always makes sure there is retribution to anyone who crosses him. The only soft spot in his life is his family (which consists of his grandmother, mother, older sister, aunt) and the pretty girl who lent him a pen during his final college exam. He cannot forget the girl that lent him a pen and has been searching for her for 6 years. Not knowing her name or who she is the only memory he has of her: a fuzzy image in a picture he keeps on his desk at home and the pen he never got the chance to return to her.

Yang Yi-ru is a hardworking workaholic who basically runs the entire advertising company she works for, due to her boss and co-workers always depending on her for everything. To make matters worse, her boss is a womanizer who also happens to be her ex-boyfriend, whom her father and younger sister treat like a member of the family. Her boss and family con her into taking an actual vacation, by faking her medical test results to say she has cancer and only six months to live. They pack her off on a trip to sunny Boracay, Philippines, telling her to take some time to relax.

Shi-de also happens to be on a business trip in Boracay, and saves Yi-ru when she is in a daze and almost gets run over by a van. He thanks the heavens for finally being able to meet her again, the girl that lent him a pen all those years ago. Seeing how distressed Yi-ru is, he lets her know that she can confide to him about her problems. She spills out to Shi-de about her regrets on not being able to meet someone she will love, get married, have kids and live a happy old life with her husband. When he hears she only has 6 months left to live, he proposes marriage to her immediately. Yi-ru thinks Shi-de’s proposal is out of kindness to make a dying woman happy. Unbeknownst to her, they had actually met in college and that he has been in love with her all these years. Shi-de decides to put his business trip on hold and stay by Yi-ru’s side. He gives her the most romantic and beautiful wedding reception by the beach. He also tries to fulfill her dying wishes.

Touched by all that her new "pretend" husband has done for her to make her happy, she is overcome with emotion and sleeps with him (losing her virginity in the process), making their marriage feel real. When Yi-ru finds out her illness was a prank by her family and boss, she leaves for Taiwan immediately, without saying goodbye to Shi-de. Not wanting to lose her again, Shi-de returns to Taiwan and vows to find her, but when he finds her and finds out her illness was a lie, he feels cheated and unleashes his wrath on Yi-ru, making her life miserable because he thinks she had tricked him into dropping his lawsuit against the company she works for. He gives her the advertising account for his company so he can bully her.

When their misunderstanding is finally cleared up, he tries to pursue her again because he is still madly in love with her. Yi-ru being able to see Shi-de’s vindictive side during his wrath on her wants nothing to do with him after their business relationship ends. Knowing how he can’t lose her again he tries hard on changing his perspective on people to win her back. Desperate for Yi-ru to accept his love for her he uses their business relationship and signs up for cooking class with her father just to be able to have a chance to see her. He even ask for her boss's help to better understand Yi-ru's personality, but Yi-ru remains unfazed by all that he has done and tells him to stop wasting his time on her. She even rejects his offering to start all over and be friends so that they can get to know each other better.

During a business outing at an orphanage Yi-ru accidentally spies on Shi-de playing with a bunch of kids and finds out that he is a major sponsor at the orphanage. Being able to see a softer and gentler side of him she starts falling for him and accepts his love for her. They get married and go through family and personal issues together, both realizing they must cherish the present.

== Cast ==
=== Main cast ===
- Annie Chen 陳庭妮 as Yang Yi-ru (楊奕茹) - Age 28

A workaholic with a hot temper. She doesn't like to be deceived or lied to by others. She manages and runs the entire advertising company Sun Qi-ming owns because her boss is lazy and her co-workers rely on her too much. She meets Lan Shi-de in Boracay and marries him thinking she only has 6 month to live. When she tells Shi-de her illness was a lie, he decides to make her life miserable. Seeing his stern vindictive side, she wants nothing to do with him after their professional business relationship ends. After seeing a softer and gentler side of Shi-de, she falls for him and marries him for real when she almost loses him during an accident.

- George Hu 胡宇威 as Lan Shi-de (藍仕德) - Age 28

General Manager of his family bathroom fixture business Hao Sheng. Cold and hot tempered, all of his employees are terrified of him. He does not like to be deceived or lied to by others because he was betrayed by his former employees when he took over his family business. He cares deeply of his family and is very protective of them. He has been in love with Yang Yi-ru since meeting her in college and searching for her ever since. For anyone that crosses him he makes sure there is payback, even if it's the girl he loves. After his misunderstanding is cleared with Yi-ru, he tries hard to change his cold-hearted attitude to win her love. He eventually convinces Yi-ru that his love for her is sincere and they get married for real when she thought she had almost lost him during an accident.

- Bobby Dou 竇智孔 as Sun Qi-ming (孫啟鳴) - Age 33

Yang Yi-ru's womanizing boss and ex-boyfriend. Owner of Feng Hua advertising company. He is a lazy slacker who doesn't take work or life seriously. He refers to his multiple girlfriends as goldfishes he raises in a fish bowl. He has a kind personality and is always considerate of others. He thinks of Yi-ru's family as his own due to his lonely childhood upbringing. Discovers he actually does love Yi-ru after Shi-de comes into the picture, but Yi-ru knowing his personality too well rejects his love for her and chooses Shi-de. He comes to accept Yi-ru and Shi-de's relationship and treats both as his own family members. He later finds love with He Cai-rong and marries her.

- Harry Chang 張懷秋 as Zheng Yu-xiang (鄭雨翔) - Age 25

Blames Lan Shi-yun self help love books for the break up of his relationship with his ex-fiancee. Plans a revenge scheme against Shi-yun to make her fall in love with him and then break her heart. He owns a bike messenger mail courier service/cafe shop with his friend. While getting to know Shi-yun during his revenge scheme he eventually falls in love with her for real and finds out his ex-fiancee never really loved him but was using Shi-yun's books as an excuse to end their relationship.

- Vivi Lee 李維維 as Lan Shi-yun (藍仕筠) - Age 32

Lan Shi-de's older sister. She's a famous author of self help love books even though she is 32 years old and last of her friends not to be married. She starts dating Yan Kai but breaks up with him when he tells her he doesn't want to get married. She starts falling for Zheng Yu-xiang later on but is heart broken when she uncovers his scheme to exact revenge on her.

=== Supporting cast ===
- Esther Yang as Yang Yi-qing (楊奕晴) - Age 25

Yang Yi-ru's younger sister. She's a recent college graduate that works as a bicycle messenger mail courier at her former classmate Zheng Yu-xiang shop. Her plan in life is to catch a successful guy which she refers to as fishes. She is immature and nosy. Angus and Guo Zi-yuan both have crushes on her but she dates Angus later on.

- Shen Meng-sheng 沈孟生 as Yang Hao (楊浩)

Yang Yi-ru and Yang Yi-qing's father. Loves his wife who died of cancer. He has never remarried or doesn't plan too. He teaches cooking classes from his kitchen at home. He treats Sun Qi-ming as a son and originally wanted Yi-ru to choose him, but accepts her decision when she chooses Shi-de. He later supports Qi-ming's relationship with Cai-rong by telling him to get over his doctor phobia.

- Yen Chia-le as Lan Yi-ping (藍以蘋)

Lan Shi-de and Lan Shi-yun's aunt. Works alongside Shi-de at Hao Sheng as the Deputy Manager. Falls in love with Yang Hao after attending one of his cooking classes. Past 40 years old and has never been married. She's a loving aunt to her niece and nephew. She takes a liking to Yi-ru immediately and tries to set her up with Shi-de even before knowing she was his dream girl. She gives advice to Shi-de to make sure he doesn't make a mistake and lose his chance at happiness with Yi-ru.

- Shen Hai-jung as Lan Ceng Yue-ling (藍曾月鈴)

Lan Shi-de and Shi-yun's grandmother. She is constantly setting Shi-de up on blind dates because she wants him to get marry as soon as possible so she can have a great grand child. Highly superstitious person who goes by time and date for setting up all important events. She can be unreasonable at times but it's only because she desperately wants great grand children before she gets too old and can't take care of them.

- Yang Chieh-mei as Fang Xiu-qing (方秀琴)

Lan Shi-de and Lan Shi-yun's mother. Stay at home mom who likes to take care of her whole family. Her husband died 6 years ago in an accident. She is in charge of the cooking and housekeeping in the Lan household. She understands the pressure and unpleasantness Shi-de's goes through when he is set up on blind dates by his grandmother but tends to side with her mother-in-law in order not to offend her.

- Mandy Wei as He Tsai-jung (何采蓉)

Oncologists doctor (cancer specialist) and star pupil of her class. She was originally enlisted by Shi-de to treat Yi-ru when he thought she had cancer. Lan grandmother tries to set her up with Shi-de after seeing them chat with each other, but because she is a detailed person she knows Shi-de loves Yi-ru and thinks of him as a friend. She falls in love with Sun Qi-ming because of his kindness towards others. She helps Qi-ming reconcile with his mother. Later she and Qi-ming starts dating and gets married at the end.

- Kao Cheng-peng 高振鵬 as Uncle Kang (康叔)

Elderly man who works at Sun Qi-ming's company. Main duties are running menial errands for Qi-ming such as getting lunch, refreshments and cleaning the office. He tends to not understand what is going on in the current situation and ask his co-workers to explain to him what is happening.

- Liu Hsiang-chun 劉香君 as Su Mei (素梅)

A middle-aged lady who works at Feng-Hua. She has 3 children that she needs to support. She heavily relays on Yi-ru for everything at work. Afraid that Yi-ru would leave Feng Hua one day and the company will go out of business.

- Tie Ke as Xiao Wei (小偉)

18-year-old young man but looks 38 years old who works at Feng-Hua. His family back in Hualien County depend on him to send money back to them monthly. He assist Yi-ru on video editing.

- Hank Wu as Guo Zi-yuan (郭子元)

Zheng Yu-xiang's friend and co owner of their courier/cafe shop. He has a crush on Yi-Qing. He's the only one that knows of Yu-xiang's revenge scheme on Lan Shi-yun. Constantly tells Yu-xiang to give up on his revenge scheme but he's always left at deaf ears.

- Huang Chien-hao 黃建豪 as Angus Zhou Jin Chi (周金馳)

Lan Shi-de's personal assistant at Hao Sheng. He has a crush on Yi-Qing. He's Shi-de's most trusted subordinate at Hao Sheng.

- Albee Liu 劉堇萱 as Albee

Works at Hao Sheng. Helps Shi-de and Qi-ming to a hotel one night when they are heavily drunk after participating in a beer drinking contest.

- Wu Rui Zhen 吳芮甄 as Wu Xiao Zhen (吳小甄)

Works at Hao Sheng. Forgets to knock at Shi-de's office door while he is degrading Yi-ru and gets scold at by Shi-de.

- Shaun Chen as Yan Kai (嚴凱)

Lan Shi-yun mistakes him for her blind date. Starts dating Shi-yun for real but has no plans for marriage due to a previous unhappy marriage with his ex-wife. He and Shi-yun breaks up and he transfers to his company Singapore office. Works as a computer tech designer.

- Hong Chenying 洪晨穎 as An Qi (安琪)

Zheng Yu-Xiang former fiancee. Uses Lan Shi-yun self help love advice books as an excuse to break up with him. She later marries someone else.

- Kelly Ko 柯素雲 as Huang Wenling (黃文玲)

Sun Qi-ming's mother. Physician running a clinic in a small town. Due to her busy career as a doctor when her son was growing up he thought she did not love him.

=== Cameos ===
- Verna Lin 林欣蓓 as Samantha (莎曼莎)

Yi Ru's friend and hotel staff in Boracay. Unfortunately she is the one that breaks the news to Yi-ru about her fake illness and gets beaten up.

- Xu Wei-xiao 徐維孝 as Zhao Zi-chen (趙子宸)

Blind date Aunt Yi-ping sets up for Shi-yun but he already has a girlfriend who has a nasty attitude.

- Wu Siyu 吳思育 as Professor Ge (葛教授)

Cai-rong's mentor and former professor at medical school. Works at the same hospital as Cai-rong.

- Paul Hsu 許騰方 as Ouyang Rui (歐陽銳)

Skilled surgeon and Cai-rong's senior. He treats Yi-ru when she is pregnant and ill. Tries to break up Cai-rong and Qi-ming because he likes Cai-rong.

- Michael Zhang 張勛傑 as Zai Yu (傅在宇) Note: Micheal Zhang's character from "A Hint Of You".

Chef/owner at a teppanyaki Japanese restaurant. Shi-de's friend who reserves his entire restaurant and make his famous egg fried rice for Yi-ru when a pregnant Yi-ru craves for it.

- Irene 豆豆 as Lan Huan-huan (藍歡歡)

Shi-de's and Yi-ru's 4 year old daughter. She appears in Shi-de's dreams.

== Soundtrack ==
- Go Jogging 一起去跑步 by Cosmic Man 宇宙人
- You Want To Be Made Into A Movie 想把你拍成一部電影 by Cosmic Man 宇宙人
- Kick Him 踢踢他 by Cosmic Man 宇宙人
- Temporary Boyfriend 暫時的男朋友 by Yen-J 嚴爵
- I alibi 吾在場證明 by Yen-J 嚴爵
- Fueled 火上加油 by Yen-J 嚴爵
- Hold Your Hand 執子之手 by Victor 品冠
- C.J. 倉頡 by Mayday 五月天
- Wild Beast 野獸 by Ding Dang 丁噹
- Marksman 射手 by MP Magic Power MP魔幻力量
- After 經過 by Rene 劉若英
- Fill in the Blanks 填空 by JiaJia 紀家盈（家家）

== Production team ==
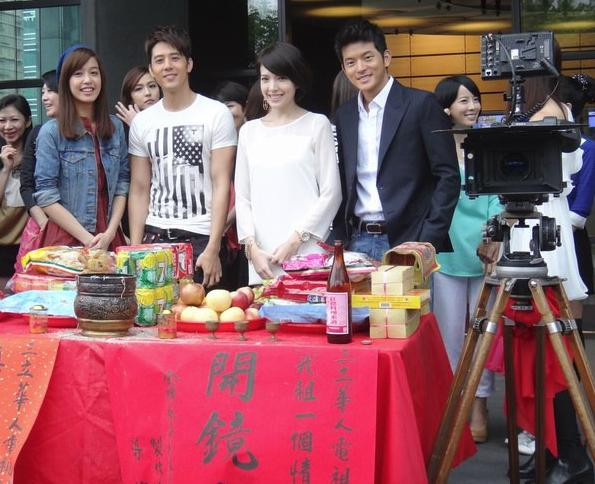
Double lens opening ceremony on September 16, 2012 for Love, Now and Love Me or Leave Me. From left to right: Annie Chen, George Hu, Ann Hsu and Chris Wang.

Produced from the same team that produced SETTV 2011 to 2012 hit Taiwan romance drama Inborn Pair. Hoping to strike double rating success with their "Inborn Pair leads, Annie Chen and Chris Wang was then split up to film two different new romance dramas to be aired back to back. Annie Chen was paired up with George Hu who was personally invited by Sanlih to film "Love, Now" after spending the past year filming dramas in Mainland China. In an interview with China's LETV he stated that he had agreed to take on the lead role during early development of the project, when the title, story and plot was still not developed yet, in order to re-establish his presence in Taiwan since he had not appeared in a Taiwan television drama for over a year and was afraid Taiwanese audiences would forget him. While Chris Wang was paired up with Ann Hsu to film Love Me or Leave Me. Both dramas started filming at the same time.

- Producer:
  - Fang Xiaoren 方孝仁
  - Rong Junyi 戎俊義
- Screenwriter:
  - Shao Huiting 邵慧婷
  - Lín Pèiyú 林珮瑜
  - Zheng Yingmin 鄭英敏
  - Huangxiang Min 黃湘玟
- Directed by: Lian Li Chun 連春利
- Coordinator: Can Qian Li 李能謙
- Sponsor:
  - Acer Computer
  - Derek Bathroom Fixtures
  - HTC

== Filming locations ==
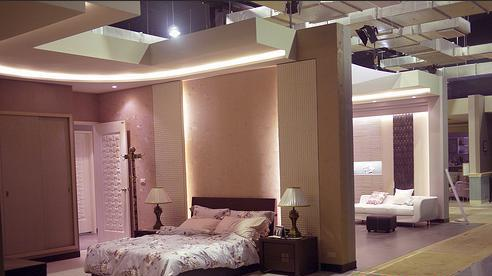
image showing studio built set of the Lan residence and part of the Yang residence at the far right

Interiors of the Lan family home, Yang family home, offices of Hao Sheng and Feng Hua are studio built sets at SETTV headquarters. The exterior of the Lan's bathroom fixture office Hao Sheng is an office tower located at Tiding Boulevard, Zhongshan District of Taipei. The exterior of Feng Hua where Yang Yi-ru worked is an office building located at Tiding Boulevard, Neihu District of Taipei. The exterior and lobby of the Lan family residence was filmed at "Future Hill" residential complex located at Wenhuaer Rd, Linkou District of New Taipei City. The exterior and courtyard of the Yang family residence was filmed at a residential complex located at Yanshou St, Songshan District of Taipei. The residence of Sun Qi-ming is actually the office of an landscaping and interior design company called "Lake Forest Design" located at Kangning Road, Neihu District of Taipei. Other major filming locations include "Min-Sheng General Hospital" where He Cai-rong works as a doctor, "A House" cafe where Zheng Yu-xiang operates his cafe and bike messenger business, "Aqua Kiss 2-Surfer" where the main characters frequented to chat and have a drink, and "Fushin Hotel" room 1108 (where Lan Shi-yun spent her drunken night, Shi-da and Yi-ru had their intimate day, and Sun Qi-ming's pre-wedding prank party was held) . Hsuan Chuang University and Yuen Ze University were used as the school Lan Si-da and Yang Yi-ru attended university, Boracay Philippines scenes were filmed between October 3 till October 13 of 2012. The bathroom scene of Lan Shi-da talking to the toilet bowl and shower kiss scene in episode 3 and 4 was actually filmed at "Fushin Hotel" in Taipei instead of Alta Vista De Boracay.

=== Taipei, Taiwan ===
- Neihu District
  - Aqua Kiss 2-Surfer 水吻
  - Acer HQ Taipei
  - RT-Mart 大潤發
  - Nakamura Bakery 中村
  - White Rock Lake Bridge 白石湖吊橋
  - Fushin Hotel 台北富信大飯店
  - Lake Forest Design 大湖森林室內裝修設計工程有限公司
- Zhongzheng District
  - Cold Stone Creamery 酷聖石冰淇淋
- Zhongshan District
  - We-Go Motel 薇閣精品旅館
  - Shintori Cuisine Japonaise 新都里懷石料理
  - Taipei Florist 台北花苑
- Xinyi District
  - California Pizza Kitchen
- Daan District
  - A House Breakfast & Brunch Restaurant
  - SILEX BOOKS
  - pH7 Restaurant
  - Playboy
  - Single Noble
  - L'OCCITANE Café 歐舒丹Café
  - CHUNG's SILVER WORK STUDIO 玩銀工房
- Datong District
  - Li Ting Xiang Chinese Bakery 李亭香餅舖
- Wanhua District
  - Modern Toilet
- Sanzhi District
  - Suang-Lien Presbyterian Church 雙連安養中心教堂

=== New Taipei City, Taiwan ===
- Linkou District
  - Future Hills Luxury Complex 遠雄大未來
- Banqiao District
  - Megacity Mall 板橋大遠百

=== Taoyuan County, Taiwan ===
- Taoyuan City
  - Min-Sheng General Hospital 敏盛綜合醫院
- Luzhu Township
  - Decor House
- Zhongli City
  - Yuan Ze University 元智大學

=== Hsinchu City, Taiwan ===
- Xiangshan District
  - Hsuan Chuang University 玄奘大學

=== Boracay, Philippines ===
- Puka Shell Beach
  - Discovery Shores Boracay
  - Alta Vista De Boracay
  - D'Mall
  - Kalibo Airport

== Reception ==
The pairing of George Hu and Annie Chen was a success. Three month after "Love, Now" finished airing Sanlih decided to pair them up again in 2013's "Love Around" which was aired every Sunday night on Sanlih's other channel TTV.

== Broadcast ==
Country/Region	Channel	Timeslot	Episode premiere	Episode finale	Avg rating
Taiwan	SETTV	Monday to Thursday 21:00	31 October 2012	5 March 2013	-
Taiwan	ETTV	Monday to Thursday 23:00	31 October 2012	5 March 2013	-
Singapore	StarHub TV VV Drama	Monday to Friday 19:00	14 February 2013	24 May 2013	
Hong Kong	J2	Monday to Friday 19:30	28 February 2013	10 June 2013	
Malaysia	Astro Quan Jia HD	Saturdays 13:00 (5 episodes back-to-back)	23 March 2013	29 June 2013	

== Episode ratings ==
Date of Broadcast	Episode	Ratings	Ranking	Notes	Date of Broadcast	Episode	Ratings	Ranking	Notes
31 October 2012	1	1.94	4	ETTV will broadcast at 11pm	2 January 2013	37	-	3	-
1 November 2012	2	1.68	4	-	3 January 2013	38	-	3	-
2 November 2012	3	1.54	4	-	7 January 2013	39	-	3	-
5 November 2012	4	1.91	3	broadcast every Mondays to Thursdays -	8 January 2013	40	-	3	-
6 November 2012	5	2.15	3	-	9 January 2013	41	-	3	-
7 November 2012	6	2.21	3	-	10 January 2013	42	-	3	-
8 November 2012	7	1.77	3	-	14 January 2013	43	-	3	-
12 November 2012	8	-	3	-	15 January 2013	44	-	3	-
13 November 2012	9	-	3	-	16 January 2013	45	-	3	-
14 November 2012	10	-	3	-	17 January 2013	46	-	3	-
15 November 2012	11	-	3	-	21 January 2013	47	-	3	-
19 November 2012	12	-	4	-	22 January 2013	48	-	3	-
20 November 2012	13	2.02	4	-	23 January 2013	49	-	3	-
21 November 2012	14	-	4	-	24 January 2013	50	-	3	-
22 November 2012	15	2.25	4	-	28 January 2013	51	-	-	-
26 November 2012	16	-	3	-	29 January 2013	52	-	-	-
27 November 2012	17	-	3	-	30 January 2013	53	-	-	-
28 November 2012	18	-	3	-	31 January 2013	54	-	-	-
29 November 2012	19	-	3	-	4 February 2013	55	-	3	-
3 December 2012	20	-	3	-	5 February 2013	56	-	3	-
4 December 2012	21	-	3	-	6 February 2013	57	-	3	-
5 December 2012	22	-	3	-	7 February 2013	58	-	3	-
6 December 2012	23	-	3	-	11 February 2013	59	-	3	-
10 December 2012	24	-	3	-	12 February 2013	60	-	3	-
11 December 2012	25	-	3	-	13 February 2013	61	-	3	-
12 December 2012	26	-	3	-	14 February 2013	62	-	3	-
13 December 2012	27	-	3	-	18 February 2013	63	-	3	-
17 December 2012	28	-	3	-	19 February 2013	64	-	3	-
18 December 2012	29	-	3	-	20 February 2013	65	-	3	-
19 December 2012	30	-	3	-	21 February 2013	66	-	3	-
20 December 2012	31	-	3	-	25 February 2013	67	-	3	-
24 December 2012	32	-	3	-	26 February 2013	68	-	3	-
25 December 2012	33	-	3	-	27 February 2013	69	-	3	-
26 December 2012	34	-	3	-	28 February 2013	70	-	3	-
27 December 2012	35	-	3	-	4 March 2013	71	-	3	-
1 January 2013	36	-	3	-	5 March 2013	72	-	3	Finale
On 31 December 2012，SETTV will broadcast 2013 New Year's Countdown

== Episode description ==
Episode	Notes
1	When told she only has six months to live (which turns out to be a bad joke), Yang Yi Ru takes a vacation to Boracay where she meets a successful businessman Lan Shi De. He saves her life and they spend the day together after someone stole his luggage.
2	Shi De finds out that Yi Ru has been told she's going to die from liver cancer and spends the day convincing her that he will fulfill all her promises of falling in love (at age 28), getting married and having 3 kids (starting at age 30) before she "dies". While this is going on her family and boss think she's found out and isn't angry at all even though Yi Ru has called Qi Ming (he pretended not be able to hear her).
3	Shi De brings a wedding dress to Yi Ru and they get married. They both feel awkward after the wedding, Yi Ru asks Shi De if they will consummate the marriage however after a nervous Shi De hides in the bathroom while Yi Ru stresses that she's shameless, Shi De just tells her he's trying to fulfill her dreams and that they don't need to. She wakes up the next day where he plans to do more stuff, making a scrapbook of the stuff they have done. Samantha finds out Yi Ru got married because she didn't find out the truth of her "illness".
4	After seeing the scrapbook Shi De made for her, Yi Ru interrupts his shower... Samantha is caught trying to put a note under their door and is forced to tell Yi Ru the truth and Yi Ru beats her up. Whereas Shi De is trying to work up the courage to tell Yi Ru to make their marriage real once they get back to Taiwan and finds only Samantha beaten up and Yi Ru checked out heading back to Taiwan. She gets back and confronts her family as well as Qi Ming and tells him what has happened before she found while Shi De comes back and tells his family and assistant that he is married (no more blind dates) and is going to find Yi Ru and introduce her. Now he remembers the first time he met Yi Ru in school when she gave him a pen to complete his exam.
5	Shi De talks to his family more about Yi Ru (Shi Yun being upset he got married before her and getting compared to the 40 year old spinster aunt). Yi Qing finds out that Yi Ru married and consummated her relationship from Qi Ming
6	Yi Ru meets with Shi De's aunt in an attempt to get the lawsuit against Qi Ming dropped with no success. The aunt leaves Yi Ru to continue present shopping for her mother's birthday. Shi De finds Yi Ru in the department store. Yi Ru asks Shi De to consider dropping the lawsuits against Qi Ming and he agrees. Before Yi Ru can confess the truth she gets an emergency call. Shi De's aunt sees the end of their exchange and tells her discovery to the family.
7	Shi De’s family (with the exception of Shi Yun) are excited to learn he’s found Yi Ru. Qi Ming makes a failed attempt to make up with Yi Ru. Yi Ru finally confides in her father about what happened during her vacation and the recent lies she told. After explaining she wants him to be happy, Shi Yun asks Shi De to promise not to make his marriage public for a while to prevent criticism, since her little brother married before her (the esteemed yet single relationship expert). Shi De drops the lawsuit against Qi Ming and hires Yi Ru’s company for the latest project. Shi De takes Yi Ru to the hospital for further medical testing. Yi Ru escapes to the restroom and while attempting to find a way out Shi De overhears that she lied to him. Meanwhile Yu Xiang returns Shi Yun’s repaired tennis bracelet damaged in her blind date altercation.
8	Yu Xiang follows Shi Yun on her morning jog and other places. She confronts him. Shi Yun reminds Yu Xiang that she takes her privacy seriously and will call the cops if he keeps following her. At lunch Yi Ru finally tells Shi De she lied, returns the wedding ring and attempts to return the company contract. Shi De tells her he can accept the ring but not the contract. Shi De leaves to inform his aunt he will be taking back control of the case Yi Ru’s company will be working on. The aunt visits Yi Ru’s company and learns the marriage was fake but the feelings were real. Qi Ming finally learns who Yi Ru married. Shi De throws his memories from the vacation (including the ring) into the trash. A wedding invitation to Yu Xiang’s bike shop reveals why he’s been following Shi Yun.
9	-
10	-
11	-
12	-
13	-
14	Shi De's aunt explain to him that it was Yi Ru's family that lie to her about having cancer. Shi De went to Yi Ru's downstair at her house to apologize to Yi Ru for the misunderstanding.
15	Shi De brought Yi Ru to their old school. He revealed that she had helped him by giving him the pen during the exam.
16	-
17	Shi De asked Yi Ru to redo the video production and asked her why she ran away. Qi Ming went to Shi De’s office and causes a scene asking him not to bully Yi Ru. Shi De ends up apologising to Qi Ming. They have a private meeting and Shi De asks for advice on how he can pursue Yi Ru.
18	Shi De acts quickly on pursuing Yi Ru. He surprises her at her office and gifts her a hamster. He goes to her home and meets with her dad. He apologises to her dad for treating her badly and asks if he can date Yi Ru. Qi Ming accidentally bump into Cai Rong in the bar. Cai Rong ask him to dance and he says no.
19	Yi Qing went after Yan Kai by bumping him at his office front desk. He end up giving her a lollipop and a free mouse and told her to ask for company special sales department when she needs help buying computer. Shi De asked Yi Ru to lunch and to meet the noon deadline for the video production. Qi Ming went with Yi Ru and purposely made an act purposely to break the CD recording. Shi De saw Yi Ru beat up Qi Ming. Being angry at Qi Ming, Yi Ru accidentally walked onto a suspension bridge. Being scared of heights, Shi De saved her by carrying her off the bridge.
20	Shi De proposed to Yi Ru at her office in front of everyone. Yi Ru rejected him saying not to take her gratitude as love. Shi Yun (Shi De's sister) saw a wedding dress and talked about marriage. Yan Kai disagreed with Shi Yun the idea of marriage. Afterward, Shi Yun sang by herself at KTV and got drunk. Somehow, Shi De and Qi Ming wake up together in hotel with a red high heel and a stocking. However, they can't remember what happened.
21	Cai Rong went to Shi De's house. Shi De asked Cai Rong how to go after Yi Ru. Qi Ming propose to Yi Ru with candle light dinner.
22	Yan Kai went to see Shi Yun. Yan Kai ask her to give him time to change his idea of not getting marry. Shi De saw the conversation between his sister and Yan Kai. Shi De warn him not to hurt his sister. Shi Yun asked Shi De what happened at the hotel. Shi De told her it was all misunderstanding. Shi De also told his sister that he doesn't know what happen and am not sure who the high heel and stocking belong to. Shi De and Qi Ming went to investigate what happened that night with at the hotel with the mysterious lady. Shi De and Qi Ming did get information from the security guard that the lady brought them that night had a nice voice and looked cute. She also calls one of them the general manager. Yi Ru accidentally says Shi De is cute for investigating what happened that night. Yu Xiang (planning to revenge on Shi Yun) delivered wedding present that she will be attending. Shi Yun starting to fall for him by giving him a towel and for him to sit down.
23	Shi De went to learn to cook with Yang Teacher. Shi De told Yang Teacher that he wants to learn how to cook and cook for Yi Ru. Albee came to Yi Ru's house with Qi Ming's request. Albee told the truth that night she was the one who brought them to the hotel. She left the hotel in a hurry leaving her high heel and stocking behind. Qi Ming propose to Yi Ru in the office to go steady. Qi Ming formally propose to her but got rejected right on the spot.
24	Yi Ru and Shi De bump into each other at the hypermarket. Shi De propose to her again and Yi Ru say she would think about it. When leaving and walking behind Yi Ru, Yi Ru tripped and fell on Shi De with a long kiss.
25	Shi De’s aunt proposed to Teacher Yang. Yu Xiang cooked bibimbap for Shi Yun.
26	Shi De's aunt got rejected by Teacher Yang. But she promised that she will find love for Teacher Yang's both daughter. So, Teacher Yang can focus on finding his true love after both daughter are happily marry. Qi Ming got fever staying up all night to finish a project competition. Cai Rong told Yi Ru to treasure both Qi Ming and Shi De's love. But to told them the truth if she doesn't love either one of them.
27	Yi Ru and Shi De spend the day together. Yi Ru's company is doing pro bono work for an orphanage in which Shi De is a sponsor of. Yi Ru takes Shi De to the orphanage and plans to film him in his capacity as a sponsor. Shi De agrees to help Yi Ru. Yi Ru films Shi De's interactions with the children. She asks each child what wishes they would like to come true. Shi De is asked what his wishes are. He replies that he would like to fulfil the wishes he promised someone. Yi Ru brings Shi De to a classroom. She returns the pen Shi De gave her. Shi De appears to be heartbroken and took this to mean she is rejecting him. He tells her he will always have her in his heart and if he is going to be rejected then he wants to leave. Yi Ru smiles and explains the reason she brought him to the classroom was not to reject him. She gets embarrassed, she turns away and faces the chalk board. She picks up the chalk and writes on the board, "would you help me make my 28th birthday wishes come true <3". Shi De is overjoyed. With a face full of happiness he writes on the board that he would love to. At this point are officially a couple. After their outing, they go back to Yi Ru's office. They are standing outside Yi Ru's car and little do they know, Qi Ming is watching them from the front of the building. He witnesses the happy couple smiling and Shi De holding onto Yi Ru's hands and telling her how he doesn't want to say goodbye. Qi Ming is left feeling distraught.
28	Yi Ru tells Qi Ming that she is in a relationship with Shi De. Yan Kai and Shi Yun break up. At the end of the episode a heartbroken Qi Ming watches Yi Ru and Shi De drive off. Qi Ming goes back to the office. He picks up the stuffed animal he gave Yi Ru and takes out an engagement ring he hid in the stuffed animal's hat.
29	-
30	-
31	-
32	-
33	-
34	-
35	-
36	-
37	-
38	-
39	-
40	-
41	-
42	-
43	-
44	-
45	-
46	-
47	-
48	-
49	-
50	-
51	-
52	-
53	-
54	-
55	-
56	-
57	-
58	-
59	-
60	-
61	-
62	-
63	-
64	-
65	-
66	-
67	-
68	-
69	-
70	-
71	-
72	-

== Awards ==
- 2012 Sanlih SETTV Drama Awards - Best Kiss
  - George Hu & Annie Chen - Winner
