= Love Me or Leave Me (TV series) =

- Promotional poster
- Also known as: I Rented A Lover
- 我租了一個情人
- Genre: Romance
- Created by: Sanlih E-Television
- Written by: Ye Feng Ying
- Directed by: Lin Qing Zhen
- Starring: Ann Hsu; Chris Wang
- Opening theme: Gave You 都給你 by Chris Wang
- Ending theme: Happiness is like 幸福就好 by Soo Wincci
- Country of origin: Taiwan
- Original language: Mandarin
- No. of series: 1
- No. of episodes: 16

Production
- Producers: Fang Xiaoren; Rong Junyi
- Production location: Taiwan
- Running time: 120 minutes
- Production company: SETTV

Original release
- Network: SETTV
- Release: 8 November 2012 – 21 February 2013

Related
- What Is Love; Big Red Riding Hood

Love Me Or Leave Me (Chinese: 我租了一個情人; pinyin: Wo Zu Le Yi Ge Qing Ren) is a 2012–2013 Taiwanese television series created and developed by SETTV. It stars Ann Hsu, Chris Wang as the main leads with Albee Huang, Lee Kang-i and Alan Kuo as the supporting cast. Filming began on September 16, 2012, and finished on February 17, 2013. It began airing on SETTV ETTV on November 8, 2012. The last episode aired on February 21, 2013, with 16 episodes total for the original Taiwan broadcast and 29 episodes for the mainland China and Hong Kong version.

== Synopsis ==
Ji Qing (Ann Hsu) has commitment issues due to her parents' failed marriage and her father's infidelity. Even though she is in a stable and loving relationship with her longtime boyfriend Fang Hao Ming (Chris Wang), she hesitates when he talks about marriage. To test if Hao Ming will remain faithful to her, she hires Zhao Shan Shan (Albee Huang) to test if he will cheat on her. Ji Qing's plan seems to backfire when Shan Shan seemingly has falls for Hao Ming for real.

== Cast ==
=== Main cast ===
- Ann Hsu as Ji Qing
- Chris Wang as Fang Hao Ming
- Albee Huang as Zhao Shan Shan
- Lee Kang-i as Liao Yi Ren
- Alan Ko as Ding Sheng Hua

=== Supporting cast ===
- Chen De Lie as Wang Da Shuai
- Dou Dou as Wang Dou Dou
- Elaine Wan as Fang Yong Xin
- Tao Chuan Zheng as Ji Shi Xian
- Lin Xiu Jun as Mrs. Fang
- Lin Shu Yu as Zhuang Xiao Xian
- Lin Mei-hsiu as Zeng Hai Ling

== Soundtrack ==
- All for You 都給你 by Chris Wang
- Miss Right 宥勝 by Chris Wang
- Happiness Is Like 幸福就好 by Soo Wincci
- I'll Be Alright 過得去 by Soo Wincci
- The Invisible Man 隱形人 by Yuan Chengjie
- So you 就這樣嗎 by By2
- Love To Pick On 愛情來找碴 by By2
- Not A Person 不是一個人 by Jeanie Zhang

== Production team ==
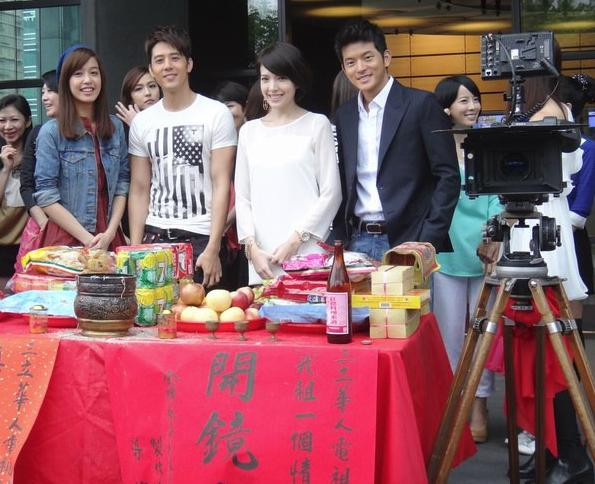
Double lens opening ceremony on September 16, 2012, for "Love, Now" and "Love Me Or Leave Me". From left to right: Annie Chen, George Hu, Ann Hsu and Chris Wang.

Produced from the same team that produced SETTV 2011 to 2012 hit Taiwan romance drama "Inborn Pair". Hoping to strike double rating success with their "Inborn Pair" leads, Annie Chen and Chris Wang was then split up to film two different new romance dramas to be aired back to back. Chris Wang was paired up with Ann Hsu to film "Love Me Or Leave Me". While Annie Chen was paired up with George Hu to film "Love, Now". Both dramas started filming at the same time. "Love Me Or Leave Me" is Ann Hsu's first drama as the lead actress after many years of playing supporting roles in Taiwanese dramas.

- Producer:
  - Fang Xiaoren 方孝仁
  - Rong Junyi 戎俊義
- Screenwriter:
  - Ye Feng Ying 葉鳳英
- Directed by:
  - Lin Qing Zhen 林清振
- Production Company:
  - Golden Bloom Production Co., Ltd. 金牌風華影像製作股份有限公司

== Broadcast ==
Country/Region	Channel	Timeslot	Episode premiere	Episode finale	Avg rating
Taiwan	SETTV	Friday 20:00	9 November 2012	22 February 2013	–
Taiwan	ETTV	Thursday 22:00	8 November 2012	21 February 2013	–
Singapore	StarHub TV VV Drama	Sunday 22:00	26 November 2012	22 February 2013	
Hong Kong	J2	Monday to Friday 19:00	21 August 2013	5 September 2013	
Malaysia	Astro Quan Jia HD	Monday to Friday 22:30	16 May 2013	31 May 2013	

== Episode ratings ==
Episode	Date of Broadcast	TTV Ratings	SETTV Ratings	ETTV Ratings	Notes
01	2012/11/08、11/09	0.51	1.21	0.52	
02	2012/11/15、11/16	0.57	0.76	0.33	
03	2012/11/22、11/23	0.32	1.09	0.25	
04	2012/11/29、11/30	0.43	0.82	0.38	
05	2012/12/06、12/07	0.43	0.57	0.29	
06	2012/12/13、12/14	0.33	0.60	0.24	
07	2012/12/20、12/21	0.27	0.62	0.24	
08	2012/12/27、12/28	0.33	0.49	0.21	
09	2013/01/03、01/04	0.34	0.72	0.23	
10	2013/01/10、01/11	0.38	0.63	0.27	
11	2013/01/17、01/18	0.45	0.87	0.36	
12	2013/01/24、01/25	0.38	0.74	0.21	
13	2013/01/31、02/01	0.44	0.54	0.30	
14	2013/02/07、02/08				
15	2013/02/14、02/15	0.38	0.70	0.32	
16(End)	2013/02/21、02/22	0.42	0.95	0.42	
Average Ratings		–	–	–	–

== Awards ==
- 48th Golden Bell Awards – Best Supporting Actress In A Drama
  - Albee Huang – Nominated
