= Love Around =

2013 Taiwanese romantic comedy television series

- Promotional poster
- Also known as: Real Love Black and White, Zhen Ai Hei Bai Pei
- 真愛黑白配
- Genre: Romance, Comedy
- Created by: Sanlih E-Television
- Directed by: Zhang Jinrong 張晉榮(Ep 1–7); Wu Mengen 吳蒙恩(Ep 7–21)
- Starring: George Hu 胡宇威; Annie Chen 陳庭妮
- Opening theme: Come Back To Me by Bii 畢書盡
- Ending theme: Nothing To Do With Happiness 幸福無關 by Bii 畢書盡
- Country of origin: Republic of China (Taiwan)
- Original languages: Mandarin with some Hokkien dialogue
- No. of series: 1
- No. of episodes: 21

Production
- Producers: Fang Xiaoren 方孝仁; Xie Yisheng 謝益勝
- Production location: Taiwan
- Running time: 90 minutes
- Production companies: Golden Bloom Production Co., Ltd. 金牌風華影像製作公司

Original release
- Network: TTV
- Release: 9 June – 27 October 2013

Related
- King Flower 金大花的華麗冒險; Deja Vu 回到愛以前

Love Around (Chinese: 真愛黑白配; pinyin: Zhen Ai Hei Bai Pei) is a 2013 Taiwanese idol romantic comedy television series. The television drama was produced and created by Sanlih E-Television starring George Hu as the male main lead and Annie Chen as the female main lead. The Chinese title literally translate to "Real love black and white". Filming began on 15 May 2013 and finished on 5 October 2013. It began airing on 9 June 2013 on TTV channel after King Flower. The last of the 21 episodes aired on 27 October 2013.

This marks the second series that George Hu and Annie Chen co-starred and paired up with each other after Love, Now in 2012. Due to the success and positive response of their pairing on their previous drama "Love, Now" Sanlih decided to pair up George Hu and Annie Chen again, 3-month after their previous drama ended.

== Synopsis ==
Two individuals with opposite family backgrounds, she is the daughter of a former Chief of Police and he is the son of a former triad boss, become friends when both have just been dumped by their significant others. They use their heartbreak to console each other, but soon their friendship turns to love. However, their love may not survive, when she publicly offends a man she doesn't know is his father.

== Summary ==
It' s Zhou Zhen's birthday, but his heart is broken. His ex-girlfriend who had previously promised to celebrate each birthday with him, broke up with him recently due to his family's background. His father was a former triad boss who has since left that life for over 10 years and is now a land developer. To get over his heartbreak, he goes to a recreational batting cage facility, where he meets Liang Xiao Shu. She is there to purchase a birthday gift for her boyfriend. The baseball bat that Xiao Shu wants is not for purchase and must be won by entering in a batting contest. In order to practice for the contest, she uses an empty batting cage that Zhou Zhen has reserved since he does not like others by his side when he is batting. Zhou Zhen ask her to leave and they have an argument about having common courtesy for others. Zhou Zhen does not listen and ask her to leave immediately or else he will have the staff drag her out, knowing there is no way to reason with him she abides and walks away. During the contest Xiao Shu finds out it is impossible for her to win since she is not good at batting. Seeing how great Zhou Zhen is at batting she begs him to enter the contest and win the baseball bat for her by telling him it's a gift she really wants to get her boyfriend for his birthday. He agrees, seeing it's a gift for her boyfriend's birthday and wins the baseball bat for her.

Xiao Shu is extremely happy she got the prize and can't wait to present it to her boyfriend. While on her way to meet her boyfriend, she accidentally gets in a taxi that Zhou Zhen is already riding in, she apologizes and gets out. Seeing it's heavily pouring rain and Xiao Shu just standing out in the open waiting for another taxi Zhou Zhen guilt gets the better of him and he ask the taxi driver to turn back. He decides to share the taxi with Xiao Shu. Xiao Shu spends almost the entire taxi ride talking on her cell phone with her mom and hadn't noticed when Zhou Zhen got off at his stop. She asked the taxi driver about Zhou Zhen when she notice he wasn't in the taxi anymore, the driver tells her he has already been dropped off at his stop but has also already paid for his and her fare. She ask the driver to turn back to his stop because she wanted to pay him back for paying for her fare. While looking for Zhou Zhen at his family resort/hotel she sees her boyfriend with another women. She decides to follow them and confront them. Zhou Zhen sees her and follows her since he does not know why she is there. Upon confronting her boyfriend Xiao Shu gets dumped by him and yelled at for being too conservative and cold. Zhou Zhen witnesses their argument, not being able to take it, he beats up Xiao Shu's ex-boyfriend.

The pair slowly become friends to get over their heartbreaks, but Xiao Shu not knowing Zhou Da Kuan is Zhou Zhen's father offends Zhou Da Kuan on her radio program since she does not believe he is a fully reformed person and is still using his mafia ways in business dealings. Upon hearing her radio broadcast Zhou Da Kuan is furious and ask his colleague to buy out Xiao Shu's radio station. He also enlist friends to remove their advertisement from her radio station. Since Xiao Shu does not want her parents to worry about the situation at the radio station she relays her problems to Zhou Zhen. Zhou Zhen finds out that his father is behind all the problems happening at the radio station. Not wanting to have disagreements with his father and still wanting to keep Xiao Shu as his friend, he ask Xiao Shu to give him a job at her radio station so that he can secretly help her stay afloat.

Xiao Shu and Zhou Da Kuan's situation gets cleared up later on and Zhou Zhen is asked by his father to leave the radio station and return to his work at the family resort. With Zhou Zhen no longer at the radio station Xiao Shu realizes she had fallen in love with him. Not knowing how to tell him she uses all kinds of tactics to see if he likes her too, even praying to the god of relationships and offering Zhou Zhen a piece of candy from the shrine that is supposed to make the person that eats it fall in love with the person that offers it. Zhou Zhen refuses the candy at first making Xiao Shu feel lost, but being away from Xiao Shu has also made Zhou Zhen realize he has feelings for her too but he too does not know how to approach her about it. He later finds out the meaning of the candy Xiao Shu had offered him earlier and eats it in front of her letting her know he wants to be with her too.

Xiao Shu and Zhou Zhen parents decide to set up a lunch date to meet each other since both of their children are in a committed relationship. Each side finding out that they had met before because Zhou Da Kuan is the person responsible for the accidental death of Xiao Shu's younger brother. Liang Mama's mental disorder comes back upon meeting Zhou Da Kuan again. Liang Papa demands Zhou Zhen end his relationship with Xiao Shu immediately as he does not want anyone related to Zhou Da Kuan involve with his family. At first Zhou Zhen refuses but seeing how severe Liang Mama's disorder is he agrees to end the relationship hoping Liang Mama's disorder won't become anymore worst. Zhou Zhen lies to Xiao Shu telling her he has gotten back together with his ex-girlfriend. She is heartbroken but is aware of the true reasons why he broke up with her and fights for their relationship to continue.

Xiao Shu regains part of her childhood memory and remembers that her father is also to blame for her brother's death. She thanks (unable to apologize because he was still partially responsible for her brother's death) Zhou Da Kuan for taking the full responsibility all these years and also lets him know she was at the scene of the accident and remembers everything now. Zhou Zhen realizes how much pain Xiao Shu must be in due to their break up and remembering the details to her brother's death, he decides to get back together with her because he still loves her very much and can't bear to see her go through so much pain alone. He lets her know that love is between two people and that he is horrible for not even fighting for their love. He apologizes for breaking up with her and lets her know how much he really loves her.

Liang Mama finds out her husband is partial to blame for their son's death. She ask for a divorce because she can't forgive him for hiding such a huge secret all these years. While away from his family Liang Papa and Zhou Da Kuan make amends and let bygones be bygones since both are aware they will most likely end up being in laws. Xiao Shu proposes that she and Zhou Zhen get married because she wants to reunite her parents at her wedding day. At first Liang Mama does not agree to Xiao Shu marrying Zhou Zhen because she does not want to see her husband. When Liang Mama finally agrees to them marrying Zhou Zhen questions Xiao Shu if she really wants to get marry and then proposes to her with a heart shaped ring. They get married at the chapel at Zhou Zhen's resort.

== Cast ==
=== Main cast ===
- George Hu 胡宇威 as Zhou Zhen 周震

A quiet and reserved person. He is extremely loyal and protective of his loved ones. He grew up without any friends due to his isolated childhood upbringing. His mother died when he was young and his father, a former triad boss served a prison sentence for most of his childhood. He was raised by his grandmother and took care of his younger sister for most of his childhood. He manages his family seaside hotel/resort business. He loved his former girlfriend very much but she broke up with him due to his father's criminal history. He meets Xiao Shu by accident, over a misunderstood argument. The two become fast friends to get over their heartbreak and soon start falling for each other.

- Annie Chen 陳庭妮 as Liang Xiao Shu 梁小舒

Owner and DJ of radio station Asia FM 92.7. She has a sunny and righteous personality due to her father being the former police chief. She believes justice must be served to those that deserve it. She meets Zhou Zhen while lecturing him about having common courtesy for others. The two become friends when Zhou Zhen stands up for her when she is being dumped and bullied by her cheating ex-boyfriend. She starts falling for Zhen while the two go through a heartbreak together, but she also offends Zhou Da Kuan, whom she didn't know was Zhen's father.

- Jack Lee 李運慶 as Gao Zhe Xuan 高哲宣

Xiao Shu's neighbor and childhood friend. He meets Xiao Shu again when he runs into her at a café after returning from the US. He works as an accountant, but he also helps Xiao Shu manage the radio station finances during his free time. He was often neglected as a child by both of his parents and spent most of his after school days at Xiao Shu's home, where Xiao Shu's mother would make him an after school snack and dinner. His parents divorced when he was young and he moved to the US with his father. He has been in love with Xiao Shu since their childhood but she only thinks of him as a brother. He meets Zhou Ying Ying while saving her from an on coming motorbike, it causes her embarrassment and she gets mad at him. She demands he apologizes for the incident, he refuses and she harasses and pesters him until he agrees to apologize to her.

- Mandy Tao 陶妍霖 as Zhou Ying Ying 周瑩瑩

Zhou Zhen's younger sister. She grew up spoiled due to her brother being overly protective of her. Her days consist of going shopping and having fun with her friends. She meets Gao Zhe Xuan when he saves her from an on coming motorbike but while saving her he accidentally causes her embarrassment. Not being thankful and gracious she demands he apologizes to her. He refuses and bluntly tells her what he thinks of her which leads to her starting up her own clothing boutique to prove him wrong. To show Zhe Xuan how wrong he is of her she personally hires him as her accountant, but the more she gets to know him the more she falls for him seeing what a good man he is.

=== Supporting cast ===
- Tan Ai-chen 譚艾珍 as Chen Mei Li 陳美麗

Zhou Da Kuan's Mother. Zhou Zhen and Ying Ying's grandmother. She's a loving mother and grandmother who only wants her entire family to be happy. When Zhen and Xiao Shu goes through a rough period in their relationship, she tries her best to help them get past it. She enjoys playing the app game Candy Crush and mah jong.

- Jian Chang 檢場 as Zhou Da Kuan 周大寬

Zhou Zhen and Ying Ying's father. A former triad boss leader who has since been reformed. He decided to give up his criminal past when he accidentally kills a young boy while fleeing from the police. After being released from prison he made his fortune honestly in real estate and investing in bankrupted businesses. He does not like to be reminded of his criminal past and tends to use unethical ways to quiet the ones that criticizes him. Xiao Shu, who thinks he is still dealing business with his triad past offends him on her radio program.

- Wang Juan 王琄 as Tang Hui Shan 唐惠珊

Xiao Shu's mother and Liang Yi Lei's wife. A caring mother who is overly protective of her daughter. She is a stay at home mom who reminds her forgetful daughter of her curfew each night. She approves of Xiao Shu and Zhen's, who she refers to as Mr. Handsome, relationship even when she finds out his father was a former triad boss. She cannot get over her sons death and has gone through mental instability due to it.

- Zhang Fu Jian 張復建 as Liang Yi Lei 梁一磊 親

Xiao Shu's father and Tang Hui Shan's husband. A retired chief of police who is highly respected by his family and former peers. A protective father who testes Zhen to see if he truly loves his daughter due to her past cheating boyfriend. Knowing of Zhen's family past he approves his and Xiao Shu's relationship seeing that Zhen really loves his daughter, but once he finds out who Zhen's father really is he demands Zhen to end their relationship immediately. He seems like an honorable man in the eyes of his family but he has a secret that he has been keeping from everyone.

- Chen Jing Jie 瑤涵沂 as Jessica 潔西卡

Xiao Shu's friend since college. Works and helps Xiao Shu manage Asia FM 92.7 radio station. A overly protective friend, she helps Xiao Shu realize her feelings for Zhen. Later she accidentally falls in love with Zhen's personal assistant Fei Li, but keeps it a secret from everyone else as she does not want others to know of their relationship.

- Hsueh Shih-ling as James

Former one hit wonder singer who is currently a DJ at Asia FM 92.7 radio station. He constantly wants to regain his past fame by playing his one hit song on the radio over and over again. All the female staff at the radio station does not take him seriously and thinks of him as just one of the girls. A self proclaimed ladies man, he later matures up when he meets the new station manager, Penny and falls for her.

- Stephanie Chang 張珮瑩 as Fei Fei 菲菲

Astrologer DJ at Asia FM 92.7 radio station who is in charge of giving daily horoscope readings. Does not respect James and thinks of him as an immature joke at the station. She disappears from the station period at a time when it is mentioned that she is unable to give horoscope or feng shui readings.

- Yumi Chiu 邱慧雯 as Yu Mi 玉米

Asia FM 92.7 radio station office assistant. Her main duties at the station is to assist everyone and order lunch.

- Christina Mok 莫允雯 as Chen Ping Ying 陳品穎

Zhou Zhen's former girlfriend who breaks up with him because she said his father's background as a former triad boss tarnishes her reputation as a music teacher, but actually she really loves him and did so because she was going blind and didn't want to be a burden to him. When her sight is restored she attempts to reunite with Zhen but by that time he had fallen in love with Xiao Shu and only wanted to be her friend.

- Zhao Jie 趙杰 as Fei Li 菲力

Zhou Zhen's personal assistant and driver who helps him run the seaside hotel/resort. It is assumed that he is a former triad member due to his mannerism. He later develops a crush on Jessica by accident, with his persistent towards her the two end up dating later on.

- Yu Jue Ru 余月如 as Pei Li 培麗

Ying Ying's best friend. She is a short plump girl who is extremely loyal to Ying Ying and helps her with her schemes. She has a crush on Zhou Zhen and later develops one on Zhe Xuan. She helps Ying Ying run her clothing boutique.

=== Cameo appearances ===
- Richard Sun 孫國豪 as Jason Zhang Jie Wei 張建偉

Xiao Shu's cheating ex-boyfriend who Zhou Zhen beats up while defending her. Xiao Shu catches him having a rendezvous with another women at Zhen's resort/hotel on his birthday.

- Yang Shaowen 楊少文 as Lao Wan 老萬

Works for Zhou Da Kuan, whom Zhou Da Kuan enlist to try to acquire Asia FM 92.7 radio station. He sets up a meeting with Xiao Shu and tells her that he is interested in buying her radio station.

- Edwin Gerard 紀亞文 as Liu Na Wen 劉亞文

Chen Ping Ying's Ophthalmologist (eye doctor). When Zhen runs into him and Ping Ying together she lies to Zhen by telling him that her eye doctor is her new boyfriend.

- Li Melanie 李京恬 as Micky 美琪

Daughter of Zhou Da Kuan friend who is staying at the resort/hotel. She just returned from the US and Da Kuen tries to set her up with Zhou Zhen.

- Bii 畢書盡 as Peter

Zhou Zhen's friend who he bike races against to get a commercial advertising contract from for Asia FM 92.7 radio station. Even though Zhen did not win the bike race, Peter decides to give him the contract anyway when Zhen is injured and he finds out he did all this for a woman.

- Qian Bo Yu 錢柏渝 as Penny

Zhou Zhen's friend and former employee who he enlist to help manage Asia FM 92.7 finances. James falls in love with her at first sight, he matures up and pursues her after finding out she is a single mother with a young daughter with an illness.

- Liu Belkin 劉爾金 as Zhou Sheng Min 周聖敏

A corrupt politician who drove drunk and caused a hit and run on a young boy that was witnessed by Xiao Shu. He kidnaps Xiao Shu and holds her hostage at a secluded house when she threatens to report him to the authorities. When Zhou Zhen tries to rescue Xiao Shu he has him beaten up.

== Soundtrack ==
Love Around did not release an official soundtrack album. Majority of the songs used for the drama soundtrack are from Bii's 2013 album "Come Back To Bii". Other songs in the soundtrack are taken from Miu's 2013 album "The Power of Being 存在的力量", Elleya Tao's digital single "I Love You" and Jhan Yu Chi's 2013 album "Before Departure 啟程前".

- Come Back To Me – Bii 畢書盡
- Nothing To Do With Happiness 幸福無關 – Bii 畢書盡
- I Know – Bii 畢書盡
- I Will Be By Your Side 我會在你身邊 – Bii 畢書盡, Miu 朱俐靜
- Kiss Me – Miu 朱俐靜
- Ten Million Tears 一千萬次的淚水 – Miu 朱俐靜
- I Love You – Elleya Tao 陶妍霖
- Let's Go 走吧 – Jhan Yu Chi 詹宇琦

== Publications ==
Love Around Official Photobook (真愛黑白配 寫真書)
- Cover image and magazine inserts
- Author: S-Pop 華流, Sanlih E-Television 三立電視監製
- Genre: photobook
- Published: 2013 Takami Corp. 高見文化行銷股份有限公司
- Publication place: Taiwan
- Media type: Print paperback
- Pages: 120

* 30 September 2013 : Love Around Official Photobook (真愛黑白配 寫真書) – barcode 4717095572034 Takami Corp. 高見文化行銷股份有限公司 – Author: Sanlih E-Television 三立電視監製

A special 120 page edition of Sanlih's monthly magazine S-Pop 華流 was published in September 2013 to exclusively devote to the drama "Love Around". The special issue contains 8 collectible postcards, a miniature die-cut card board cut out of George Hu and Annie Chen, and a fold out poster of George Hu and Annie Chen from their photo shoot for S-Pop July 2013 issue. The contents contain behind the scenes and production images of the drama, introductions to the drama story line and characters, exclusive cast interviews and soundtrack lyrics info.

* 2 July 2013 : S-Pop Vol. 7 July 2013 (華流 7月號/2013) – barcode 4717095583306 Wisdom Distribution 大智通文化 – Author: Sanlih E-Television 三立電視監製

For the July 2013 issue of S-Pop magazine, four different covers were published pertaining to "Love Around". The four different covers featured George Hu & Annie Chen together, Annie Chen alone, George Hu alone, and singer Bii who sang the opening and closing theme song for the drama.

== Filming locations ==
Love Around was filmed entirely on location in Taiwan. Asia FM 92.7, the radio station depicted in the drama is an actual free to air radio station in Taiwan with its headquarters and broadcasting station in Taoyuan City, Taoyuan County. The building and set used in the drama to depict the radio station is actually an office building located at 257 Xinhu 2nd Rd., Neihu District, Taipei City, which is only a few blocks from Sanlih's broadcasting headquarters in the Neihu District of Taipei. The resort that Zhou Zhen owns is the former "Leo Ocean Resort" now called "EHR Hotels & Resorts Yilan", located in Yilan County. The homes of both main lead characters are located in the newly developed area of Danshui District New Taipei City.

=== Taipei, Taiwan ===
- Neihu District
  - 257, Xinhu 2nd Rd.
  - Family Mart Xinhu 2nd Rd.
  - SLEEP COUNTRY 睡眠王國床墊專業館
  - E♥FLOWER 品心國際花藝設計
  - Fani Burger 費尼漢堡 瑞光店
  - Waffogato
- Zhongshan District
  - Lequn 3rd Road & Zhifu Road
- Songshan District
  - Taiwan Sports Lottery 運動彩券
  - IKEA
- Datong District
  - Yue Lao Bank (Matchmaking services) 月老銀
- Daan District
  - Playboy
  - FPG-Style
  - Être
  - Yvonne Collection
  - TJB Cafe
- Shilin District
  - Yuanshan Bowling Alley 圓山保齡球館

=== Yilan County, Taiwan ===
- Toucheng
  - EHR Hotels & Resorts Yilan 東森海洋溫泉酒店

=== Hsinchu County, Taiwan ===
- Guanxi Township
  - Leofoo Village Theme Park 六福村

=== New Taipei City, Taiwan ===
- Danshui District
  - My Warm Day Fresh Brunch 麥味登
  - TaiBay No.2 湯泉國際 海灣造鎮
- Banqiao District
  - Megacity Mall 板橋大遠百
  - New Taipei City Library No. 62, Zhuangjing Rd, Taiwan 220
- Jinshan District
  - Chin Pao San 金寶山
- Shimen District
  - Fuji Fish Market
- Xizhi District
  - Kuan He

=== Taoyuan County, Taiwan ===
- Taoyuan City
  - TAROKO SPORTS 大魯閣
  - Min-Sheng General Hospital 敏盛綜合醫院
  - Bubble Town Craft Beer 桃園縣
- Luzhu Township
  - Windmill Restaurant 風車的故鄉庭園餐廳
  - Ark Restaurant 水悅方舟異國料理
- Zhongli City
  - Taoyuan International Baseball Stadium
- Dayuan Township
  - Taiwan Taoyuan International Airport

== Production team ==
- Producer: Pan Yiqun 潘逸群, Liu Qiuping 劉秋平
- Assistant Producer: Xu Shi Qi 徐詩淇
- Planning: Tour Fang Xuan 游芳瑄
- Publicity: Song Meiling 宋美玲, Chen Jingbo 陳靖波
- Producer: Fang Xiaoren 方孝仁, Xie Yisheng 謝益勝
- Screenplay:
  - Yu Yuan Yuan 禹元元, Huang Xuanying 黃宣穎 (Episodes 1–3)
  - Yu Yuan Yuan 禹元元, Huang Xuanying 黃宣穎, Lai Yu Xuan 賴瑀瑄 (Episode 4)
  - Yuan Yuan 禹元元, Lai Yu Xuan 賴瑀瑄, Zheng Han Wen 鄭涵文 (Episodes 5–14)
  - Yu Yuan Yuan 禹元元, Lai Yu Xuan 賴瑀瑄, Zheng Han Wen 鄭涵文, Zheng Yingmin 鄭英敏, Shao Huiting 邵慧婷 (Episode 15)
  - Lai Yu Xuan 賴瑀瑄, Zheng Han Wen 鄭涵文, Zheng Yingmin 鄭英敏, Shao Huiting 邵慧婷 (Episodes 16–21)
- Directed by:
  - Zhang Jinrong 張晉榮 (Episodes 1–7)
  - Wu Mengen 吳蒙恩 (Episodes 7–21)
- Coordinator: Can Qian Li 李能謙
- Sponsor: Samsung

== Broadcast ==
Network	Country/Location	Airing Date	Timeslot	Notes
TTV	Taiwan	9 June 2013	Sundays, 10–11:30 pm	Premiere
SETTV	Taiwan	15 June 2013	Saturdays, 10–11:30 pm	Premiere
ETTV	Taiwan	16 June 2013	Sundays, 7:30-9pm	Premiere
TTV	Taiwan	16 June 2013	Sundays, 12:30–2:00 pm	Replay

== Episode ratings ==
Love Around ranked first in its pilot episode, and has continued to rank first for all its episodes. Its drama competitors are CTV's Love SOS and The Birth of the Queen, CTS's Lucky Touch, and FTV's Fabulous Boys and IUUI. The viewers survey is conducted by AGB Nielsen.

Air date	Episode	Average ratings	Rank	Behind-the-scenes average ratings	Remarks
9 June 2013	1	1.97	1	1.74	15–24 y.o. female viewers average：4.49
16 June 2013	2	2.16	1	1.35	30–49 y.o. female viewers average：3.96
23 June 2013	3	2.33	1	1.62	
30 June 2013	4	2.48	1	1.57	
7 July 2013	5	2.47	1		
14 July 2013	6	2.53	1		
Juny 21, 2013	7	2.22	1		
28 July 2013	8	2.40	1		
4 August 2013	9	2.56	1		
11 August 2013	10	2.07	1		
18 August 2013	11	2.55	1		
25 August 2013	12	2.55	1		
1 September 2013	13	1.99	1		
8 September 2013	14	1.84	1		
15 September 2013	15	2.02	1		
22 September 2013	16	2.08	1		
29 September 2013	17	1.75	1		
6 October 2013	18	1.96	1		
13 October 2013	19	1.58	1		
20 October 2013	20	1.89	1		
27 October 2013	21	2.16	1		
Average rating		2.17			

== Awards and nominations ==
The 2013 Sanlih Drama Awards Ceremony were held on 22 December 2013 at Sanlih's headquarters and broadcasting studios at No. 159, Section 1, Jiuzong Rd, Neihu District Taipei City, Taiwan.

Year	Ceremony	Category	Nominee	Result
2013	2013 Sanlih Drama Awards 華劇大賞	Best Crying Award	George Hu & Annie Chen	Nominated
2013	2013 Sanlih Drama Awards 華劇大賞	Best Kiss Award	George Hu & Annie Chen	Nominated
2013	2013 Sanlih Drama Awards 華劇大賞	Best Lady Killer Award	Jian Chang	Nominated
2013	2013 Sanlih Drama Awards 華劇大賞	Best Foolishly Award	Wang Juan	Nominated
2013	2013 Sanlih Drama Awards 華劇大賞	Best Screen Couple Award	George Hu & Annie Chen	Nominated
2013	2013 Sanlih Drama Awards 華劇大賞	Weibo Popularity Award	George Hu	Nominated
2013	2013 Sanlih Drama Awards 華劇大賞	Weibo Popularity Award	Annie Chen	Nominated
2013	2013 Sanlih Drama Awards 華劇大賞	Most Popular Overseas Award	George Hu	Won
2013	2013 Sanlih Drama Awards 華劇大賞	Viewers Choice Award	Love Around	Nominated
2013	2013 Sanlih Drama Awards 華劇大賞	Best Actress Award	Annie Chen	Won
2013	2013 Sanlih Drama Awards 華劇大賞	Best Actor Award	George Hu	Nominated
