= Inborn Pair =

- Promotional poster
- Genre: Romance; Comedy
- Written by: Zhang Yuzhong 張宇忠, Shao Huiting 邵慧婷, Lín Pèiyú 林珮瑜, Wang Lingfei 王玲斐
- Directed by: Feng Kai 馮凱
- Starring: Annie Chen; Chris Wang; Puff Kuo; Jennifer Hong
- Opening theme: Conductor 指揮家 by Richie Jen
- Ending theme: I Don't Want to Leave You Alone 我不願，讓你一個人 by Mayday
- Country of origin: Taiwan
- Original language: Mandarin
- No. of series: 1
- No. of episodes: 84

Production
- Producers: Fang Xiaoren 方孝仁, Rong Junyi 戎俊義
- Production location: Taiwan
- Running time: 60 minutes
- Production company: SETTV

Original release
- Network: SETTV
- Release: 13 December 2011 – 9 April 2012

Related
- Ti Amo Chocolate

Inborn Pair (Chinese: 真愛找麻煩; pinyin: Zhen Ai Zhao Ma Fan) is a 2011 to 2012 Taiwanese romantic comedy drama television series created and developed by SETTV. It stars Annie Chen and Chris Wang as the main leads, and directed by Golden Bell Award winning director Feng Kai (馮凱). Filming began on November 18, 2011 and debuted on SETTV ETTV on December 13, 2011. Its final episode aired on April 9, 2012 with 84 episodes in total.

== Synopsis ==
Two people who have had a couple of run ins, who never had much luck in love, found themselves betrothed by their families. They give in to a slight hope that because they had drawn the same fortunes, met coincidentally many times, and found one another interesting and attractive, that maybe just maybe they were meant to be. They misunderstand, confuse, frustrate, and hurt each other along the way. Slowly they lay down their fears and mistrust as they grow into a beautiful closeness and genuine fondness for one another. In the end, they believe that they were indeed fated and destined for one another, but the road to happily ever after is indeed a rocky one.

== Plot summary ==
Song Yi Jie (Annie Chen) is a paralegal who is studying to obtain her legal practitioner license. She is a righteous girl who cannot tolerate the weak being bullied. When she sees an unfaithful husband at her law office refusing to divorce his wife because he wants to keep his good clean image, she volunteered her service by pretending to be his girlfriend in order to obtain evidence against the husband's infidelity.

Ke Wei Xiang (Chris Wang) is the General Manager and runs his family hotel corporation. He mistakes Yi Jie to be a cheater when he meets her at his hotel. The two get off on the wrong foot when she thinks he is a womanizer while he thinks she is a home wrecker. Wei Xiang is actually an obedient son who will listen and do everything his parents and grandmother tells him to do.

The two meet again when they find out they are betrothed to each other over a promise Wei Xiang's grandmother made to Yi Jie's grandfather years ago for saving her life from a robbery. No one agrees to this marriage not even them but in order to make their grandparents happy they hesitantly proceed with marrying each other, but the two eventually fall in love and make their marriage real.

== Cast ==
=== Main cast ===
- Chris Wang as Ke Wei Xiang

The General Manager of the Weihai Group, including the resort "Animal Planet". Betrothed to Yi Jie while still in the womb by his grandmother. A very considerate and kind person with a strong sense of familial piety and good business sense. Despite his career focused life, he hopes to find a true love. He comes into conflict with Yi Jie before discovering her identity when his plans to expand Animal Planet would require the demolition of the Song family house.

- Annie Chen as Song Yi Jie

A legal assistant at a law firm in the process of obtaining her lawyer's license, she is career focused and less concerned with romance. While stubborn and brash, she has a strong sense of justice. Wants to become a lawyer to fulfill a childhood promise to her father who died in a car accident when she was young. Fiercely protective of her family home as the last memories of her childhood.

=== Supporting cast ===
- Tan Ai-chen 譚艾珍 as Ke Huang Rui Yin

Ke Wei Xiang, Ke Wei Cheng and Ke Yan Ni's grandmother. Founder of the Weihai Group. Old friend of Song Jia Bao and architect of the arranged marriage.

- Jennifer Hong 洪小鈴 as Ke Yan Ni

Oldest child and only daughter of the Ke family. Husband of Wang Ke Fan and friends with Song Yi Jie and Wu Jia Jia.

- Hsieh Kun-Da 謝坤達 as Ke Wei Cheng

Youngest son of the Ke family.

- Chris Lee as Wang Ke Fan

Ke Yan Ni's husband and Deputy Manager of the Weihai Group.

- Ai Wei 艾偉 as Ke You Xin

Ke Wei Xiang, Ke Wei Cheng and Ke Yan Ni's father.

- Yang Chieh-mei as Fang Xue Ru

Ke Wei Xiang, Ke Wei Cheng and Ke Yan Ni's mother.

- Chen Bor-jeng 陳博正 as Song Jia Bao

Song Yi Jie's grandfather and Song Lin Hao Yun's father-in-law. Old friend of Ke Huang Rui Yin and the man who saved her from robbers.

- Yang Li-yin 楊麗音 as Song Lin Hao Yun

Song Yi Jie's mother and Song Jia Bao's daughter-in-law.

- Jenna Wang 王思平 as Luo Yun

Ke Wei Xiang's college classmate and business partner.

- Tao Chuan Zheng 陶傳正 as Luo So Sai

Luo Yun's father and friend to Ke You Xin. President of a business partner to the Weihai Group.

- Yin Fu 茵芙 as Wu Jia Jia

Yan Ni and Yi Jie's friend.

- Chris Wu 吳慷仁 as Zhao Dong Yang

Song Yi Jie's college classmate and ex-boyfriend.

- Little Bin 迷你彬 as Ke Xiao Sing

Ke Wei Cheng's illegitimate son.

- Puff Guo as Li Er

Li Tian's daughter, Ke Wei Cheng's girlfriend.

- Luo Bei An 羅北安 as Li Tian

A triad boss and Li Er's father.

- Chen Yan Zhuang 壯壯/陳彥壯 as Yu Neng Qian

Ke Wei Xiang's personal assistant.

- Lin Xin Bei 林欣蓓 as Jennifer (Ba Zhen)

Head secretary at Weihai Group.

- Xie Qi Wen 謝其文 as Qian Zhen Wu

Lawyer at Da Tong law firm. Song Yi Jie's boss.

- Gao Ying Hsuan 高英軒 as Ceng Jian Ren

Wu Jia Jia's ex-husband.

- Darren Qiu 邱凱偉 as Huang Zi Ang

Manager of a construction company partnered with the Weihai Group.

- Miao Ke-li as You-Chun (cameo)

== Broadcast ==
Year	Country/Region	Channel	Timeslot	Episode premiere	Episode finale	Avg rating
2011	Taiwan	SETTV	Monday to Friday 20:00 - 21:00	December 13, 2011	April 9, 2012	-
2011	Taiwan	ETTV	Monday to Friday 21:00 - 22:00	December 13, 2011	April 9, 2012	-
2012	Singapore	StarHub TV VV Drama	Monday to Friday 19:00 - 20:00	March 26, 2012	July 19, 2012	
2012	Hong Kong	J2	Monday to Friday 13:30 - 14:30	February 9, 2012	June 5, 2012	
2012	Malaysia	Astro Quan Jia HD	Monday to Friday 22:30 - 23:30	November 30, 2012	March 27, 2013	
2015	Thailand	Amarin TV	Monday to Friday 14:00 - 15:00	June 15, 2015	September 9, 2015	

== Soundtrack ==
Inborn Pair did not release an official soundtrack. However, there are songs used in the series. In particular, the series had six songs from different artists released in their respective albums. The opening theme song used is "Conductor" (指揮家) by Richie Jen while the ending theme song used is by Mayday entitled "I Don't Want to Leave You Alone" (我不願，讓你一個人).

=== Track listing ===
No.	Title	Lyrics	Music	Singer - Album	Length
1.	"Conductor" (指揮家)	阿璞(八三夭)	黃晟峰	Richie Jen 任賢齊
2.	"I Don't Want to Leave You Alone" (我不願，讓你一個人)	阿信	阿信, 冠佑	Mayday 五月天
3.	"Unopened Gift" (未拆的礼物)	林夕	張簡君偉	Victor 品冠
4.	"I'm Sure" (我確定)	易桀齊	易桀齊, 伍冠諺	Victor 品冠
5.	"Not Your Fault" (不是你的錯)	黃婷	林邁可	Ding Dang 丁噹
6.	"One Person Is Impossible by" (一個人不可能)	嚴爵, 黃婷	嚴爵	Ding Dang 丁噹

== Reception ==
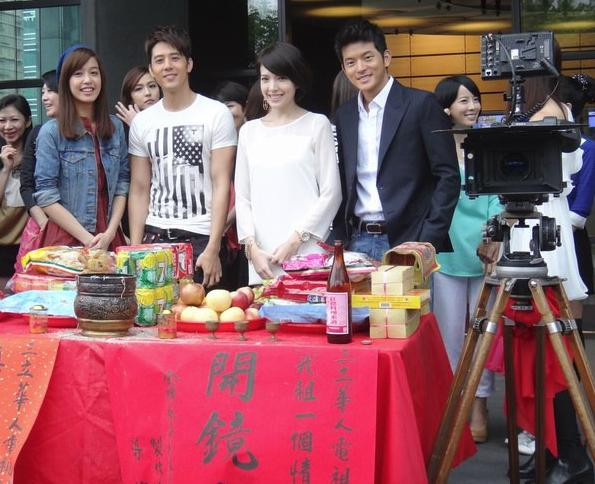
Double lens opening ceremony on September 16, 2012 for "Love, Now" and "Love Me Or Leave Me". From left to right: Annie Chen, George Hu, Ann Hsu and Chris Wang.

Inborn Pair received positive reviews from audiences and garnered successful ratings, hitting above the 5.00 rating average on certain episodes. Right after Inborn Pair finished airing, the production team went into development for Sanlih's next romance idol drama. However, hoping to strike double-rating success, they decided to split Chen and Wang up to produce two different new dramas airing back to back on Thursday nights. Annie Chen was paired up with George Hu to film Love, Now, while Chris Wang was paired up with Ann Hsu to film Love Me or Leave Me. Both dramas are from the same writers as Inborn Pair and filmed at the same time. The staff who worked on the series were also split into two team to work on both new dramas since they were produced and filmed at the same time.

== Awards and nominations ==
Year	Ceremony	Category	Result
2012	47th Golden Bell Awards	Best Supporting Actress in a Television Series; Jennifer Hong	Nominated
2012	47th Golden Bell Awards	Best Programme Marketing	Nominated
