= Chris Wang sexual misconduct case =

The Chris Wang sexual misconduct scandal refers to a sexual harassment and indecent assault controversy involving Taiwan actor Chris Wang (Yu Sheng) during Taiwan's #MeToo movement in 2023.

== Case ==
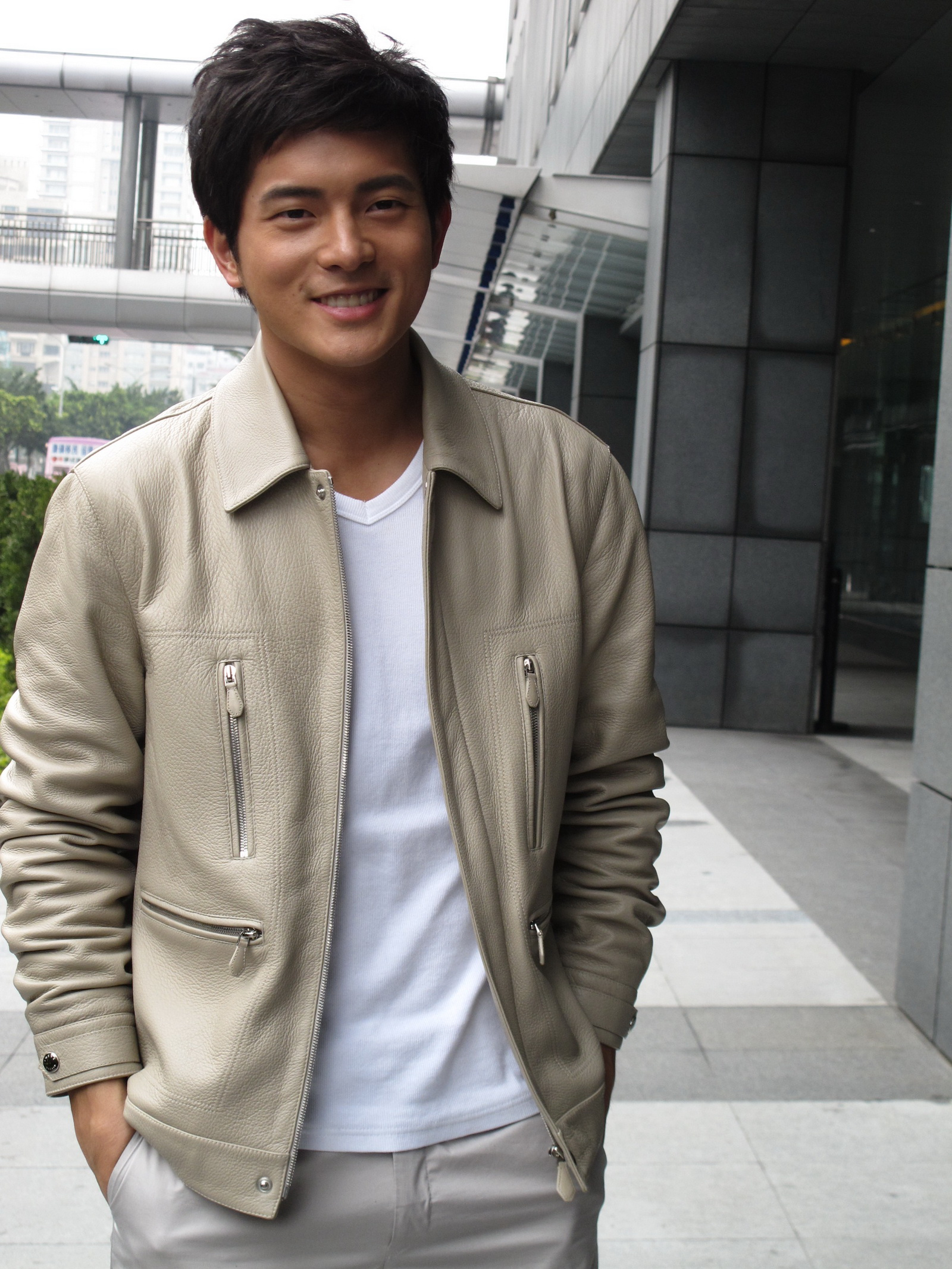
The accused in the case, You Sheng (Wang You-sheng)

In the early hours of 18 June 2023, two female former employees of a talent agency posted statements on Facebook accusing a married male entertainer of repeatedly sexually harassing several employees without their consent. Later that afternoon, Chris Wang published an apology statement on his Facebook fan page.

On 23 October of the same year, Wang posted on Facebook that after participating in a two-day "Super Men Camp" training program, he had realized that "primitive masculine power" could be transformed into something positive, reducing chaos within oneself, the family, and society and leading to a balanced and healthy life. He added that he had been "failing the course of maintaining a complete and harmonious family" since the age of four and, although he did not know how long it would take to pass, he would do his utmost to ensure that the pain and chaos that had characterized his life since childhood would not continue or be passed on to his children.

== Criminal investigation ==
On 8 November 2023, the Taipei District Prosecutors Office concluded its investigation. During the proceedings, three victims were summoned to testify, but none filed criminal complaints. Prosecutors nevertheless determined that Wang's act of straddling one victim, fondling her breasts, and licking her ear constituted indecent assault, which was not an Antragsdelikt (offense prosecutable only upon complaint), and therefore indicted him. The allegations involving the other two victims were treated as sexual harassment cases, which were Antragsdelikt offenses, and were closed because no complaints had been filed.

On 20 December, Wang wrote on Facebook that he could not help but wonder whether choosing to be honest and tell the truth had been a mistake, adding that people should hold on to their beliefs and trust that judges would clear the innocent. The following day, he posted again, stating that honesty, responsibility, admitting mistakes, and repentance were basic virtues rather than merely moral concepts found in books. He said that many things he had chosen not to disclose were out of respect, protection, and trust, and that the public's assumptions did not necessarily reflect reality.

== Trial ==
I had remained silent because I wanted to protect the woman involved. She never filed charges and never made a public statement, and I fully respected her, so I chose not to explain further. Now that the matter has entered judicial proceedings, I will fully cooperate with the investigation to prove my innocence.

— Chris Wang

On 9 January 2024, the Taiwan Taipei District Court held its first hearing and summoned Wang to appear. He arrived wearing a black face mask, a white long-sleeved shirt, black trousers, and white shoes.

According to the indictment, one evening in late 2016, after finishing work, Wang drove the victim to her residence in Xindian District, New Taipei City. Pretending that he needed to use the restroom, he entered her home and complained that he was in a bad mood. He then approached the sofa where she was sitting, suddenly straddled her legs, restrained her hands, unfastened her bra, fondled her breasts, and forcibly kissed her. Prosecutors stated that Wang controlled the victim's hands with his own, quickly unfastened her bra with one hand, licked her ear, and touched her breasts, stopping only after she continued to resist.

At a hearing on 26 March 2024, Wang changed his plea and admitted guilt. However, the victim's attorney alleged that Wang had attempted to transmit litigation materials to the victim through intermediaries after the hearing, raising concerns about possible collusion and witness tampering. After reviewing the evidence contained in the indictment, the judge found that Wang was strongly suspected of committing the offense and posed a risk of colluding with witnesses. Wang was released on bail of NT$80,000 on charges relating to offenses against sexual autonomy after the judge found strong grounds for suspicion and a risk of collusion with witnesses. He was also prohibited from directly or indirectly contacting the two victims involved in the case. Violation of those restrictions could result in pre-trial detention. Through his agent, Wang stated that he respected the court's decision and would handle everything in accordance with the law.

On 24 May 2024, the Taipei District Court sentenced Wang to eight months' imprisonment for forcible indecency. According to the judgment, in February 2024 Wang contacted the victim through a mutual friend via Line and requested a video conversation. After the victim declined, Wang again used a friend in March to deliver an apology and included suggested responses prepared by his lawyer, advising the victim to "communicate with the judge in this direction". Wang's agent responded that the case remained under judicial proceedings and that he would fully respect the court's judgment.

== Reactions ==
In June 2023, Taiwanese smart-lock brand AiLock, the Taichung City Government's Second Taichung Citizens' Picnic Day, and FIN, a beverage brand under HeySong Corporation, terminated endorsement contracts with Wang, replaced him with new spokespersons, and removed promotional materials featuring him.

Wang had previously appeared in the Taiwanese science fiction television series Q18 Quantum Dice: Allegory of the Quantum. In July 2024, Sanlih E-Television confirmed that it had decided to delete all of Wang's scenes, amounting to two episodes, resulting in adjustments to scenes involving actress Sophia Li as well. Because filming had been completed before the allegations surfaced and reshoots were impossible, the scenes were removed entirely. Lee stated that, although she found the situation regrettable, she understood and respected the decision.

Attorney Su Wen-chun commented on 9 November that because the victims had appeared in court but declined to file complaints, there were various possibilities, ranging from fully recounting the events to remaining silent. He noted that if the victims had refused to provide any account, Wang might have been acquitted. However, given that the victims had testified, Su believed that the combination of Wang's admissions and the victims' statements made conviction highly likely. He also suggested that, because none of the victims had expressed a desire to pursue prosecution, the case might ultimately end in a settlement and a suspended sentence.

According to a report by Mirror Weekly on 3 June, neighbors stated that following the scandal Wang had erected a canvas fence approximately 1.8 meters high around his residence. The Qingshui Precinct of the Taichung City Police Department stated that, after Wang moved to Qingshui District, officers established a patrol box near his home and conducted regular patrols to prevent disturbances, although no reports or complaints had been received as of June 2024. The Taichung City Urban Development Bureau stated that Wang's rented land was zoned for fourth-category residential use and that the tiny house on the property had obtained building permits, while the additional canvas fence required no further approval and did not violate regulations. Wang's manager responded only that there would be no public comment at that stage.

== Aftermath ==
On 7 April 2025, Wang attempted to revive his YouTube channel and announced plans to resume his entertainment career, but the move drew criticism and skepticism. On 12 April, he announced his withdrawal from the entertainment industry.
