= Prince & Princess 2 =

- Promotional poster
- Also known as: 王子看見二公主
- Genre: Romance; Comedy
- Directed by: Qu You Ning 瞿友寧 (Ep 1-7); Lin He Long 林合隆 (Ep 7-16)
- Starring: Dylan Kuo; Annie Chen
- Opening theme: I Love Hang Drop 我的愛吊點滴 by Rainie Yang
- Ending theme: Can You Love Me 可不可以愛我 by Afalean Lufiz
- Country of origin: Taiwan
- Original language: Mandarin
- No. of series: 1
- No. of episodes: 16

Production
- Executive producer: Chai Zhi Ping 柴智屏
- Production location: Taiwan
- Running time: 95 minutes
- Production company: Comic Ritz International Production

Original release
- Network: CTS
- Release: 14 December 2008 – 5 April 2009

Related
- Miss No Good; Knock Knock Loving You

Prince & Princess 2 (Chinese: 王子看見二公主; pinyin: Wang Zi Kan Jian Er Gong Zhu) is a 2008 to 2009 Taiwanese romantic-comedy television drama. The television drama was produced by Comic Ritz International Production, starring Dylan Kuo and Annie Chen. It was first aired on December 14, 2008 on CTS channel. Its final episode was aired on April 5, 2009 with a total 16 episodes.

== Synopsis ==
Two awkwardly individuals who lead different lives meet. He's a 27-year-old adult that is smothered by his aunt and has never made his own decision before. She's the middle child of a three daughter family who has never received much attention and feels neglected by her mother.

== Plot summary ==
Zhao Ke Rou (Annie Chen) is a recent University graduate who can't find employment and is stuck at home helping at her family hair salon. She is a crass tomboy who dresses and is sometimes mistaken as a boy, but her dream is to become a famous clothing designer. However her mother does not believe in her dream and wants her to become something more easily to obtain. Undeterred by her mother comments she secretly attends clothing design courses and makes dresses copied from fashion magazines for her older sister match make dates.

Ning Huan Yu (Dylan Kuo) is a 27 year old immature adult who has always let his aunt make his decisions for him. His parents died when he was young while on a business trip for the family pawn shop business. His aunt feels responsible and guilty for his parents' deaths and has made every decision in his life since. Huan Yu was sent away to study finance in the US since he was young and was not allowed to return home until he received his aunt's permission. Excited and happy to be returning home, he is disappointed when he finds out he will not be taking over the family pawn shop business, but instead he will be running fashion company O&K that his aunt just brought for him. Not knowing anything about fashion he and his best friend Money, who he hires as his personal assistant is ridiculed by the employees on his first day at the fashion company when he thinks the convenient store chain 7-Eleven is a fashion label that is in the ranks with LV, CHANEL, YSL etc.

Ke Rou and Huan Yu meet by accident when she goes to O&K for a job interview and him pretending to be a delivery man in order to scope out his new company. Ke Rou is asked to change into the company uniform during her interview. While changing in the company stock room she sees Huan Yu and assumes him to be a pervert. Due to her rash behavior on handling the situation she is dismissed from her job interview. The two meet again when Huan Yu's aunt signs him up for the same design course Ke Rou is attending. Blaming him for her missed chance at employment, she gives him a beat down in the school ladies bathroom and cast him as a pervert in front of all their classmates.

Wanting to take revenge for the embarrassing incident at school, Huan Yu persuades his aunt into letting him hire Ke Rou as his other personal assistant. He does not show his true identity to Ke Rou as her boss and uses his boss position to bully her and make her life miserable. Also at school they are pitted together to work on a design project as a team. But when he starts falling for Ke Rou his aunt is highly against it and wants him to be with her older sister Mu Fan, who is deemed more elegant and proper. Not wanting his aunt to rule his love life he finally stands up to her, but she fires Ke Rou from O&K hoping Huan Yu will eventually forget about her.

== Cast ==
=== Main cast ===
Actor	Role	Details
Dylan Kuo	Ning Huan Yu	Family runs a pawn shop business which he dreams of taking over once he returns from his studies in the US. To his disappointment his aunt Ning Sheng Nan buys him apparel company O & K to manage.
Annie Chen	Zhao Ke Rou	Second daughter of the Zhao family. She is usually over shadow by her older sister who is deemed more gifted and prettier than her. She dreams of becoming a famous fashion designer.
Ken Hung	Xia Kuan	Zhao Ke Rou shy friend and neighbor who has liked her since they were young but too shy to tell her. (Note: Due to medical issues Ken Hung character was written out after episode 6.)
Hong Zi Han 洪子涵	Zhao Mu Fan	Zhao Ke Rou's older sister. Her parents dote on her due to her being considered a piano prodigy. Her mom constantly sets up matchmake dates for her hoping she will marry a rich man.
Michael Zhang 張勛傑	Li Chen Xi	Head designer hired by O & K after Zhang Qi resigns. Admires Zhao Ke Rou. (Note: Michael Zhang's character Li Chen Xi first appearance is episode 9)

=== Others ===
Actor	Role	Details
Zhu De Gang 朱德剛	Zhao De Qiang	Ke Rou, Mu Fan and Xing An father. Caring father who is aware that he and his wife put their older daughter as top priority before his two younger daughters.
Ma Shi Li 馬世莉	Liu Sui Yue	Ke Rou, Mu Fan and Xing An Mother. Dotes on her older daughter Mu Fan as she sees her as her ticket out of poverty. Runs a hair salon from her home.
Ring Hsu 徐宛鈴	Zhao Xing An	Youngest daughter in the Zhao family. Ke Rou is very protective of her especially when she is around guys.
Miao Ke-li	Ning Sheng Nan	Ning Huan Yu's aunts. Cares a lot for him and wants him to have a better future then to manage the family pawn business.
Bai Yun 白雲	Cash Ning Sheng Qing	Ning Huan Yu's uncle.
Lin Long 林龍	Bank Ning Sheng Fu	Ning Huan Yu's 2nd uncle.
Qian Yu Ann 錢俞安	Money	Ning Huan Yu's close friend since childhood. Becomes Ning Huan Yu's personal assistant at O & K.
Peggy Tseng 曾珮瑜	Zhang Qi	Joins O & K as head designer after returning from the US. Resigns from O & K due to her complex relationship with her ex-boyfriend James.
Samuel Adam Whitman	James	Male model and Zhang Qi ex-boyfriend.

== Casting ==
The series marks Annie Chen's acting debut and first ever television drama. Before starring in the series, Chen had no formal acting training: she had only done print and runway modeling, cosmetic television commercial ads and corresponding hosting work. On May 25, 2012 episode of "SS Xiaoyan Night" Chen stated that in order to get the part of "Zhao Ke Rou", the director requested that she must cut her long hair to a short boyish pixie cut. She had contemplated it for a while since her appearance is very important to her as she is a model. After reviewing the issue with the head of her agency and not wanting to miss out on the chance to act in a drama, she finally agreed to cut her hair short.

== Production ==
The drama went through a lot of production issues. Original director Winnie Qu You Ning of "It Started with a Kiss" fame decided to quit after filming up to episode 7 due to creative differences with producer Chai Zhi Ping of "Meteor Garden" fame. Director Lin He Long who is known to crank out dramas at a fast pace was then brought in to finish directing the remaining episodes. In addition, the second male lead Ken Hung relapsed from pleural effusion during the Lunar New Year holidays and had to leave the drama during mid production due to the drama being filmed while it aired. The remaining unfilmed episodes were rewritten with his character written out of the drama. His character Xia Kuan's last appearance is episode 6. Michael Zhang was then personally invited by director Lin He Long to join the drama after having worked together in the idol drama "Hot Shot". His character Li Chen Xi was newly created to fill the love triangle void of Ken Hung's character Xia Kuan. Also with the departure of director Winnie Qu You Ning, the later half of the drama was completely re-written with the main characters personalities and appearance changing, story line changing and some supporting characters being written out of the drama completely with no further explanation.

== Soundtrack ==
Prince & Princess 2 (王子看見二公主) did not release an official soundtrack. However, there are songs used in the series. In particular, the series had six songs from different artists released in their respective albums. The opening theme song used is "I Love Hang Drop" (我的愛吊點滴) by Rainie Yang while the ending theme song used is by Afalean Lufiz entitled "Can You Love Me" (可不可以愛我).

=== Track listing ===
No.	Title	Lyrics	Music	Singer	Length
1.	"I Love Hang Drop" (我的愛吊點滴)	林瑋呈	Gustav Jonsson, Marcus Sepehrmanesh, Tommy Tysper	Rainie Yang 楊丞琳	3:07
2.	"Can You Love Me" (可不可以愛我)	陳穎見	陳穎見	Afalean Lufiz 陳穎見	5:14
3.	"The Rhythm of Bliss" (幸福的節拍)	陳威全	G吳易偉	Rainie Yang 楊丞琳	3:24
4.	"The Smile in Your Bosom" (在你懷裡的微笑)	JJ Lin	鄭淑妃	Rainie Yang 楊丞琳	4:01
5.	"Understanding After Loving" (愛了才懂)	鄒國權	陳彥琿	Yida Huang 黃義達	3:55
6.	"That Day" (那天)	Shadya Lan	Shadya Lan	Shadya Lan 藍又時	4:52
7.	"Nathan Road" (彌敦道)	頡臣	謝杰	Ken Hung 洪卓立	4:06

== Merchandise ==
=== Publications ===
A 128-page paperback cover photo book was published detailing behind the scenes and production of the drama. The book contains published hand written letters from the two main leads and original series director Winnie Qu You Ning showing their appreciation for the fans support of the drama. The book was published before the director change of the drama so all storyline details and concepts shown in the book are under director Winnie Qu You Ning original ideas for the series.

- December 30, 2008 : Prince & Princess 2 Behind-The-Scenes (王子看見二公主 幕後紀實看這本就夠了) - ISBN 9789866763618 Yuan-Liou Publishing Co., Ltd. 捷徑文化 - Author: Comic Ritz 可米瑞智國

=== DVD release ===
Volume	Episodes	Date Released
1	1-6	January 22, 2009
2	7-12	March 19. 2009
3	13-18	April 1, 2009
4	19-24	April 30, 2009

== Episode ratings ==
Prince & Princess 2 ranked third throughout the series with a total average of 0.73. Its drama competitors are TTV's Invincible Shan Bao Mei and My Queen, and CCTV's Love or Bread and ToGetHer. The viewers survey was conducted by AGB Nielsen with a survey range of 4yo TV audience.

Episode	Air Date	Average Ratings	Rank	Remarks
1	December 14, 2008	1.05	3	Highest ratings 1.34 every 15 minutes
2	December 21, 2008	0.96	3	Highest ratings 1.26 every 15 minutes
3	December 28, 2008	0.82	3	Highest ratings 1.06 every 15 minutes
4	January 4, 2009	1.01	3	Highest ratings 1.12 every 15 minutes
5	January 11, 2009	0.84	3	-
6	January 18, 2009	0.69	3	Highest ratings 1.11 every 15 minutes
-	January 25, 2009	-	-	No episode aired due to the Lunar New Year celebration specials
7	February 1, 2009	0.95	3	-
8	February 8, 2009	0.70	3	-
9	February 15, 2009	0.70	3	-
10	February 22, 2009	0.73	3	-
11	March 1, 2009	0.62	3	-
12	March 8, 2009	0.62	3	-
13	March 15, 2009	0.43	3	-
14	March 22, 2009	0.49	3	Highest ratings 0.60 every 15 minutes
15	March 29, 2009	0.51	3	-
16	April 5, 2009	0.58	3	Final Episode
Average ratings				0.73
