= Yang Chieh-mei =

Taiwanese actress

- 楊潔玫
- Born: 23 July 1967 (age 59); Taiwan
- Occupation: Actress
- Years active: 1984–present

Yang Chieh-mei (Chinese: 楊潔玫, born 23 July 1967) is a Taiwanese actress who won Golden Bell Award for Best Supporting Actress in 2002.

== Filmography ==
=== Film ===
Year	English title	Chinese title	Role	Notes
1984	Out of the Blue	小爸爸的天空		
1985	The Matrimony	結婚	Zeng Meixia	
1986	Drifters	流浪少年路		
1986	Gallery of Fools	哥們的糗事		
1987	Cold	那一年我們去看雪		
1988	My Mother's Teahouse	春秋茶室		
1988	The Third Bridge	海峽兩岸		
1988	Sir, Tell Me Why	老師， 有問題		
1988	Please Give Me One More Chance	再給我一次機會		
1989	Old Man and Girl	老少五個半		
1990	Five Girls and a Rope	五個女子和一根繩子	Mingtao	
1997	Sexy Story	捉姦、強姦、通姦		
1997	Love Go Go	愛情來了	Woman in sunglasses	
2013	The Regret	親愛的 我想告訴你	Wen Jinyu	
2014	Thanks for Your Patronage	銘謝惠顧	Sun Guangyuan	
2015	Jack's Grandfather	傑克的爺爺	Lin Zihong's mother	
2019	The Return	拂乡心		

=== TV series ===
Year	English title	Chinese title	Role	Notes
1986		情濃半生緣		
1989		雙飛雁		
1991		回首天已藍		
1992	Raise the Red Lantern	大紅燈籠高高掛	Chen Yihui	
1993	The Legend of Liu Bowen	劉伯溫傳奇	Bai Yuben	
1994	Peach Blossom vs. Duke of Zhou	桃花女鬥周公	Peach Blossom	
1995		台灣重案錄	Xiaofeng	
1996	Dream of the Red Chamber	紅樓夢	Qingwen	
1996		斷掌順娘	Ma Yanzhi	
1997	Who Lied to Me	誰騙了我		
1997		苦戀花		
1998		星座男女系列		
1998		歡喜遊龍	Consort Zhen	
1998	The Tai Chi Master	太極宗師	Princess Yongning	
1999		紅顏花		
1999		歡喜人家	Xu Yuwen	
2000		珍珠彩衣		
2001		愛、謊言、配偶欄		
2001	Loyal Woman, Fierce Woman, Carefree Woman	貞女、烈女、豪放女		
2002	My MVP Valentine	MVP情人	Fan Chunyi	
2003	The Pawnshop No. 8	第8號當舖	Orphanage director	
2003	Crystal Boys	孽子	Madam Huang	
2003	Go on the Stage	舞動奇蹟	Shu Man	
2004		生命的豐華		
2004		愛在碧海藍天		
2005	KO One	終極一班	Bai Mudan	
2006		換子成龍	He Qiuxi	
2007	Corner with Love	轉角＊遇到愛	Yu Xinlei's mother	
2009		幸福好滋味	Zhu Meili's mother	
2010	Those Marriage Matters	婚姻那些事儿	Zhang Qin	
2011	My Daughter	夏家三千金	Hu Liansheng	
2011	Inborn Pair	真愛找麻煩	Fang Xueru	
2012	Reunion Dinner	團圓飯	Meng Yuxian	
2012	Love, Now	真愛趁現在	Fang Xiuqin	
2012	Dong-huachun Barbershop	東華春理髮廳	Lei Wenxiu	
2014	Fall in Love with Me	愛上兩個我	Zhao Qin	
2015	Be with You	好想談戀愛	Liang Qinzhen	
2015	Taste of Life	甘味人生	Lin Wei'en	
2015	Love or Spend	戀愛鄰距離	Chen Yuhua	
2016	Memory	火車情人	Madame Fang	
2016	Prince of Wolf	狼王子	Liu Meilian	
2016	My Little Princess	親愛的，公主病	Zheng Chuyao's mother	
2016	High 5 Basketball	High 5 制霸青春	Huang Yalun's mother	
2017	Just for You	只為你停留	Wu Ruiqin	
2017	Never Forget Then	這些年那些事	Meihua	
2017	Memory Love	噗通噗通我愛你	Xing Meiyu	
2017	Home Sweet Home	真情之家	Fion	
2018	Campus Heroes	高校英雄傳	Jingwen	
2018	My Goddess	種菜女神	Xiao Liyu	
2019	A Thousand Goodnights	一千個晚安	Huang Bailian	
2019	Generation Z	90後的我們	Ashley	

== Awards and nominations ==
Year	Award	Category	Nominated work	Result	Ref
1993	30th Golden Horse Awards	Best Supporting Actress	Five Girls and a Rope	Nominated	
2002	37th Golden Bell Awards	Best Supporting Actress	Loyal Woman, Fierce Woman, Carefree Woman	Won	
2014	49th Golden Bell Awards	Best Supporting Actress in a Miniseries or Television Film	Thanks for Your Patronage	Nominated	
