= Fang Wen-lin =

Taiwanese singer and actress

- Born: Chen Mei-ling (陳美玲); 13 June 1965 (age 60); Shetou, Changhua County, Taiwan
- Occupations: Singer, actress
- Years active: 1987–present
- Spouse: Yu Kuan-hua (于冠華) (m. 1996; div. 2006)
- Children: 2
- Awards: Golden Bell Award for Best Actress in a Miniseries or Television Film; 2005
- Musical career
- Spinoff of: Feiying Trio

Chen Mei-ling (born 13 June 1965), better known by her stage name Fang Wen-lin (Chinese: 方文琳), is a Taiwanese singer and actress. In the 1980s she was part of the popular girl group Feiying Trio (飛鷹三姝) with Annie Yi and Donna Chiu.

Fang released 10 Mandopop albums from 1987 to 1998. She has since focused on her acting career, and won Golden Bell Award for Best Actress in a Miniseries or Television Film in 2005.

== Filmography ==
=== Film ===
| Year | English title | Chinese title | Role | Notes |
|---|---|---|---|---|
| 1986 | Funny's New Story | 滑稽新傳 | | |
| 1986 | Last Train to Tanshui | 我們的天空 | | |
| 1987 | Naughty Cadets on Patrol | 大頭兵出擊 | | |
| 1988 | Never-Ending Memory | 舊情綿綿 | Mei | |
| 2008 | My So-Called Love | 愛的發聲練習 | Cat's mother | |
| 2012 | Din Tao: Leader of the Parade | 陣頭 | Pear's mother | |
| 2015 | The Last Waltz | 人生圓舞曲 | Xiuhua | TV film |

=== TV Dramas ===
| Year | English title | Chinese title | Role | Notes |
|---|---|---|---|---|
| 1986 | Lovers Under the Rain | 煙雨濛濛 | Lu Hsin Ping | cameo |
| 1986 | Lovers Under the Rain | 煙雨濛濛 | Teng Ping Ping | cameo |
| 1994 | The Seven Heroes and Five Gallants | 七俠五義 | Min Rourou | |
| 2008 | Mom's House | 娘家 | He Aihua | |
| 2010 | My Family My Love | 天下父母心 | Huang Zhaodi | |
| 2010 | Lee Family Reunion | 家和萬事興 | Luo Xiuqin | |
| 2013 | Spring Love | 美人龍湯 | | |
| 2013 | A Hint of You | 美味的想念 | Zhang Wanwan | |
| 2014 | Our Mother | 阿母 | Lin Aman | |
| 2015 | Murphy's Law of Love | 莫非，這就是愛情 | Liu Xiumei | |
| 2015 | Taste of Life | 甘味人生 | Li Jinxiu | |

== Awards and nominations ==
| Year | # | Award | Category | Work | Result |
Singing
| 1987 | 9th | Golden Voice Award (金嗓獎) | Most Popular Singer | "Buyiyang de Nühai" | Won (304,381 votes) |
Acting
| 2001 | 36th | Golden Bell Awards | Best Actress (TV series) | Rogue Professor | Nominated |
| 2005 | 40th | Golden Bell Awards | Best Actress (Miniseries or TV film) | Scorpion | Won |
| 2013 | 18th | Asian Television Awards | Best Actress | Go Hula | Nominated |
| 2015 | 20th | Asian Television Awards | Best Actress | The Last Waltz | Nominated |
