= Volleyball Lover =

- Promotional poster
- Also known as: Wo De Pai Dui Qing Ren
- 我的排隊情人
- Genre: Romance, Comedy
- Directed by: Ming Jin Cheng 明金城
- Starring: Godfrey Gao; Annie Chen
- Opening theme: My Flower by Freda Li (利得彙)
- Ending theme: I Promise You by You Xuan 游喧
- Country of origin: Taiwan
- Original language: Mandarin
- No. of series: 1
- No. of episodes: 15

Production
- Producers: Wang Jun 王鈞, Ma Jing Da 馬競達
- Production location: Taiwan
- Running time: 90 minutes

Original release
- Network: CTS
- Release: 16 July – 22 October 2010

Related
- Pandamen

Volleyball Lover (Chinese: 我的排隊情人; pinyin: Wo De Pai Dui Qing Ren) is a 2010 Taiwanese idol romantic-comedy television series. The television drama stars Godfrey Gao as the male main lead and Annie Chen as the female main lead. It began airing on July 16, 2010 on CTS channel after Pandamen.

== Synopsis ==
Growing up together, Bai Qian Rui (Godfrey Gao) and Xin Hai Jing (Annie Chen) never saw one another as more than friends. So it's no wonder when Hai Xing called upon Qian Rui to help out the volleyball team, Qian Rui tried everything to wiggle out of it. He was more interested in romancing the beautiful Jia Kai Lin (Cindy Song) than sweating it out with his best pal. Yet, joining the team was exactly what they needed to turn their long-time friendship into something more.

== Cast ==
=== Main cast ===
- Godfrey Gao as Bai Qian Rui 白謙睿
- Annie Chen as Xin Hai Jing 辛海靜
- Lan Jun Tian as Liu Qing Han 陸青瀚
- Cindy Song (宋紀妍) as Jia Kai Lin 賈凱琳

=== Extended cast ===
- Long Long (龍隆) as Jia Tian Hao 賈天昊
- Jane Wang as Li Li Yi 李麗宜
- Na Wei Xun as Xin Ji 辛吉
- Yang Ming Wei as Luo De Hua 羅德華
- Zou Zong Han (鄒宗翰) as Shi Tou 石頭
- Chen Yan Ru (陳妍汝) as Mei Dai 美黛
- He Wan Ting (何宛庭) as Zhen Ping 真平
- Xu Shi Hao (許時豪) as Ma Han 馬漢
- A Da (阿達) as Wang Chao 王朝
- Wang Ming Xun (王明勳) as Xiao Mi 小米
- Wang Zi Min (王子珉) as Apple
- Jiang Wei Wen (蔣偉文) as Game show host
- Zhang Chen Guang as Referee
- Qu Zhong Heng as Breakfast owner

== Multimedia ==
Volleyball Lover did not release any soundtrack. However, there are songs used in the series. In particular, the series had ten songs from different artists, released in their respective albums. The opening theme song used is "My Flower" by Freda Li while the ending theme song used is by You Xuan entitled "I Promise You".

=== Track listing ===
No.	Title	Lyrics	Music	Singer - Album	Length
1.	"My Flower"	Jiang Tao (姜道)	Jiang Tao (姜道)	Freda Li (利得彙)
2.	"再見太難"	吳听徹/閻韋伶	吳听徹/閻韋伶	Freda Li (利得彙)
3.	"花痴"	吳听徹/陳中慧	吳听徹	Freda Li (利得彙)
4.	"I Do Not Want You" (不要你的我)	吳听徹	吳听徹	Freda Li (利得彙)
5.	"勾勾手"	游喧	游喧
6.	"不想睡"	游喧	游喧
7.	"又哭了"		游喧	游喧
8.	"I Am"		游喧
9.	"新主角"		游喧
10.	"I Promise You"	游正彥	游喧	You Xuan 游喧

== Ratings ==
The viewer ratings was conducted by AGB Nielsen.

Episode	Airing Date	Average Ratings	Notes
1	July 16, 2010	0.29	First set of average ratings is 0.5%
2	July 23, 2010	0.29	
3	July 30, 2010	0.29	
4	August 6, 2010	0.29	
5	August 13, 2010	0.29	
6	August 20, 2010	0.29	
7	August 27, 2010	0.29	
8	September 3, 201	0.29	
9	September 10, 201	0.29	
10	September 17, 201	0.29	
11	September 24, 201	0.29	aired 105 minutes
12	October 1, 2010	0.26	aired 100 minutes
13	October 8, 2010	0.26	aired 60 minutes
14	October 15, 2010	0.26	
15	October 22, 2010	0.26	Last episode
Average rating		0.28	-
