= Annie Chen =

Taiwanese actress, host and model

- 陳庭妮
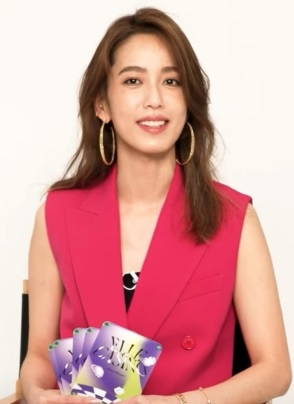
- Chen in November 2022
- Born: 28 April 1989 (age 37); Dongshi District, Taichung, Taiwan
- Occupations: Actress; host; model
- Years active: 2007−present
- Spouse: George Hu (m. 2023)
- Children: 1 daughter

Chinese name
- Traditional Chinese: 陳庭妮
- Simplified Chinese: 陈庭妮
- Hanyu Pinyin: Chén Tíngnī

Annie Chen Ting-ni (Chinese: 陳庭妮; born 28 April 1989) is a Taiwanese actress, host, and model.

She was the first person to win at the Kaiwo Phantasy Star Catwalk Girl modeling contest in 2007. A year later, she made her acting debut in Prince + Princess 2, playing the lead role Zhao Ke Rou.

== Early life ==
Chen was born on 28 April 1989, in Taichung, Taiwan. She is an only child. Chen has stated in interviews that she was conceived through in vitro fertilization because her parents had a difficult time conceiving a child naturally. Her father owned a wholesale frozen poultry business in Taichung that went bankrupt in 2010 due to the bird flu virus outbreak that year in Taiwan. She attended Viator Catholic High School (衛道中學) for junior high school and graduated from Shin Min High School (新民高中). She studied finance at Kainan University and began to work during her senior year. She then moved to Hsing Wu University of Science and Technology, Department of Finance, where she applied for leave because of her work.

== Career ==
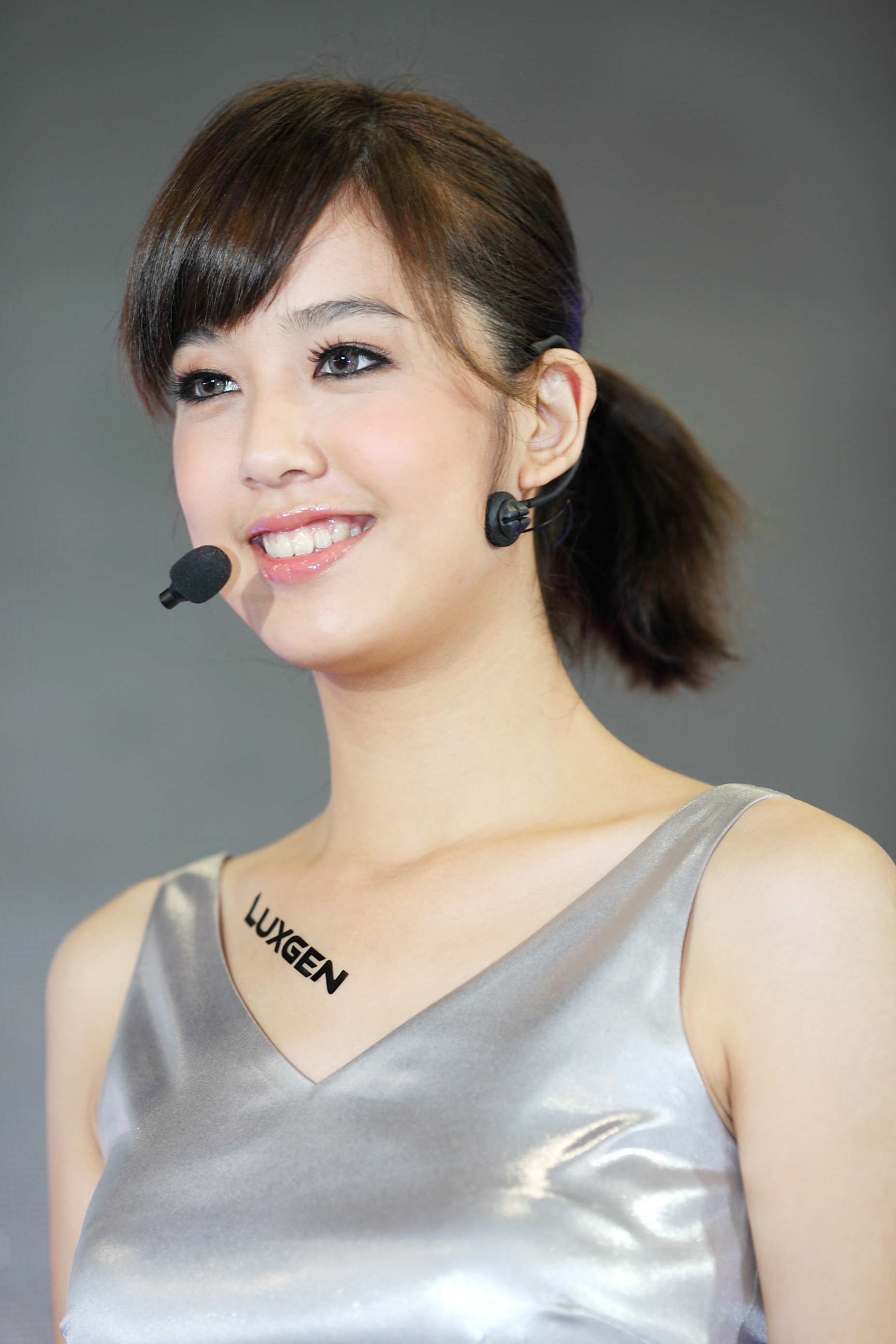
Chen in 2010

=== 2007−2008: Modeling and acting debut ===
Chen is 5 ft 9 in (1.75 m) tall. During her post-secondary years, she joined a modeling competition where she won the championship title at The First Kaiwo "Phantasy Star" CatwalkGirl contest in 2007. The selection process was between June 18 to August 18 of 2007. After winning, she began to work at the Catwalk Production House and get more opportunities, which includes being an MTV Taiwan VJ host, advertising endorser of various products, and a well-known magazine cover model.

In 2008, she gets her first recognition as an actress after starring in Judy Chou's music video, who came a runner-up in the One Million Star singing competition. Subsequently, she starred on her first acting career in CTS' Prince + Princess 2 as the female lead, Zhao Kerou.

=== 2009−2011: Television series ===
In 2009, she starred in Will Pan's song entitled "Silence Room for Rent" (寂屋出租) included in his 007 album. She was also cast in CTV's Momo Love as Zhang Kaili, Chen Qi's (Ken Chu) girlfriend.

Chen got her second and third leading roles in a television series during 2010. One is Happy and Love Forever (幸福一定强), the first series of Happy of the Rings trilogy of Anhui TV, with Ming Dao and Li Yi Feng. She played the character of Pan Xiao Nuo, a girl who coincidentally met Yin Ding Qiang after her ex-boyfriend's betrayal towards her. The next series is CTS' Volleyball Lover with Godfrey Gao. She portrayed the role of Xin Haijing, Bai Qian Rui's childhood friend and a volleyball player. In addition, Chen also starred in Life Drama Exhibition Public Television's Goodbye (再見全壘打) as Zhao Zhong Ci.

Chen, along with Ming Dao, guest starred in the second series of Happy of the Rings trilogy entitled Sunny Happiness in 2011, continuing her relationship with Yin Ding Qiang, now as a wife. She, then, played a supporting role in CTS' Material Queen as Sa Xia.

At the end of the year 2011, Chen was cast as the main female lead of SETTV television series' Inborn Pair as Song Yi Jie.

=== 2012−2013: Love Now and Love Around ===
For the third time, Chen and Dao portrayed their roles in Happy and Love Forever as a loving couple, and acted along with Mike He and Janine Chang, the casts of Sunny Happiness, in the third and last series of Happy of the Rings trilogy entitled Happy Michelin Kitchen.

After Chen's successful drama with Chris Wang on Inborn Pair in 2012, she started filming Love, Now in Boracay, Philippines with her new leading man, George Hu. Chen plays the character of Yang Yi-ru, a workaholic person who went on vacation and coincidentally meets Lan Shi-de. The series was successful as both the drama and Chen's pairing with George Hu received positive reviews.

Right after their successful team-up on March 5, 2013, Chen and Hu paired up once again on their new television series, Love Around starting on June 9, 2013. SETTV. All 21 episodes of the drama remained number one in its time slot throughout its airing.

=== 2014−present ===
Chen started 2014 mainly concentrating on modeling work. In February, during early develops she turned down the lead role for SETTV drama Love Met Cupid in order to let her contract with Sanlih E-Television expire and not renew it. The drama would later become Pleasantly Surprised, which became a hit.

After taking almost a year hiatus from acting she returned to the small screen in late 2014 with the TVBS drama Boysitter. The drama is about a single unwed mother played by Chen who has to decide if she will take back her irresponsible ex-boyfriend and father of her child played by River Huang or be with her more mature and reliable co-worker played by Melvin Sia.

In 2016, she acted in the Taiwanese film White Lies, Black Lies.

== Personal life ==
In January 2022, Chen and actor George Hu announced their engagement on Instagram. The couple had worked together on the 2012 television series Love, Now and the 2013 drama Love Around. They married in the United States in July 2023.

== Filmography ==
=== Television series ===
Year	English title	Original title	Role	Notes
2008	Prince + Princess 2	王子看見二公主	Zhao Ke-rou	
2009	Momo Love	桃花小妹	Zhang Kai-li	
2010	Happy and Love Forever	幸福一定强	Pan Xiao-nuo	
2010	Volleyball Lover	我的排隊情人	Xin Hai-jing	
2010	Goodbye	再見全壘打	Zhao Zhong-ci	
2011	Sunny Happiness	幸福最晴天	Pan Xiao-nuo	
2011	Material Queen	拜金女王	Sha Xia	
2011	Inborn Pair	真愛找麻煩	Song Yi-jie	
2012	Happy Michelin Kitchen	幸福三颗星	Pan Xiao-nuo	
2012	Love, Now	真愛趁現在	Yang Yi-ru	
2013	Love Around	真愛黑白配	Liang Xiao-shu	
2014	Boysitter	俏摩女搶頭婚	Yuan Fei	
2015	Be With Me	舞吧舞吧在一起	Chen Ting-ni	
2016	Rock Records in Love - The Last Gentleness	滾石愛情故事-最後一次溫柔	Shen Yen-Ju	
2016	Nie Xiaoqian	聶小倩	Nie Xiaoqian / Luo Xiao-qing	
2016	Golden Darling	原來1家人	Chiung Chiung	
2017	The Long Goodbye	公視人生劇展－告別	Hsiung Pao-er	
2018	My Goddess	種菜女神	Tian Li-yun	
2019	Return the World to You	歸還世界給你	Ouyang Xizi	
2019	Endless Love	天堂的微笑	Yuan Fei	Special appearance
2020	Rebirth of Shopping Addict	我不是購物狂	Huang Yan-nan	
2021	Tears on Fire	火神的眼淚	Hsu Zi-ling	
2022	No Regrets in Life	愛情發生在三天後	Ning You-zhu	
2022	Best Interest 2	最佳利益2-決戰利益	Yu Zhi-qi	
2023-present	Lego Friends: The Next Chapter	-	Liann	Main voice role, YouTube streaming series
2024	Born for the Spotlight	影后		

=== Film ===
Date	English title	Original title	Role	Notes
2011	Clear Honey Star Experience - Female Version	清蜜星體驗 - 女生版	Ann	Short film
2013	At This Moment - Love It 2013	這一刻，愛吧2013	Ren Xin Yi	Short film
2016	White Lies, Black Lies	失控謊言	Chuang Mei-yu	
2017	Pigeon Tango	盜命師	Barbie	
2018	More than Blue	比悲傷更悲傷的故事	Cindy	
2019	Dark Is the Night	黯夜	Yuan Fang	Television
2019	The Insideman	緝毒風暴	Lin Xiaoxiao	
2021	Terrorizers	青春弒戀	Monica	
2021	McCafé: From a Cup of Coffee	McCafé 從喝杯咖啡開始	Emily	Short film
2026	Fuxi: Joy in Four Chapters	腹喜		
TBA	Day Off	本日公休		

=== Music video appearances ===
Year	Song title	Artist
2008	"Lonely Box" (寂寞包廂)	Judy Chou
2009	"Silence Room for Rent" (寂屋出租)	Will Pan
2013	"Happiness Is Not A Love Song" (幸福不是情歌)	Rene Liu
2013	"Chorus Is Ever Touching" (副歌別再那麼動人)	Ming Dao
2017	"Do Not Disturb" (請不要打擾我們的愛)	George Hu
2018	"Yi Yan Yi Sheng" (一眼一生)	Shin
2019	"Nutrients" (泥土)	Rainie Yang
2022	"Blame" (我怨)	A-Lin

== Awards and nominations ==
Year	Award	Category	Nominated work	Result
2012	Sanlih Drama Awards	Best Actress	Inborn Pair	Won
2012	Sanlih Drama Awards	Best Actress	Love, Now	Won
2012	Sanlih Drama Awards	Best Screen Couple (with Chris Wang)	Inborn Pair	Won
2012	Sanlih Drama Awards	Best Kiss (with George Hu)	Love, Now	Won
2013	Sanlih Drama Awards	Best Actress	Love Around	Won
2016	53rd Golden Horse Awards	Best New Performer	White Lies, Black Lies	Nominated
2017	52nd Golden Bell Awards	Best Leading Actress in a Miniseries or Television Film	The Long Goodbye	Nominated
2021	58th Golden Horse Awards	Best Supporting Actress	Terrorizers	Nominated
2022	57th Golden Bell Awards	Best Supporting Actress in a Television Series	Tears on Fire	Nominated
