= Yung-Ping High School =

Coordinates: 25.01058°N 121.50858°E

New Taipei City Yung-Ping High School
- 臺北縣立永平高級中學
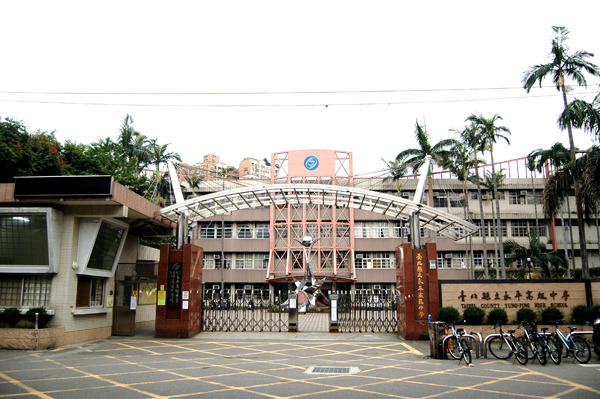

Location
- No. 205 Yung-Ping Road; New Taipei City, 234; Taiwan

Information
- School type: Public school
- Established: 1971
- Head of school: Ms Lee, Lin-Hui (李玲惠女士)
- Grades: 7–12
- Age range: 13–18
- Enrollment: 3,200 (approx.)
- Language: Standard Mandarin (Traditional)
- Campus: Urban
- Colours: Senior High School: Gray and Dark Blue, Junior High School: White and Light Blue
- Website: www.yphs.ntpc.edu.tw

Yung-Ping High School (also known as YungPing or YongPing), officially named New Taipei Municipal Yong-Ping High School (Chinese: 新北市立永平高級中學), is a high school in Yonghe District, New Taipei City, Taiwan. Originally founded in 1971 as a junior high school (grades 7–9), it was named Yung-Ping Junior High School. In 1995, this school changed its name to the present one, combining senior high school (grades 10–12) and junior high school levels. It is the first local public high school in Yonghe District.

== Location ==
Yung-Ping High School located in the western part of Yonghe District, New Taipei City. RenAi Park and Lehwa Night Market are nearby.

== See also ==
- Education in Taiwan
