= Sophia Li =

Chinese-American journalist

- Occupations: Climate advocate, multimedia journalist, film director
- Website: https://www.sophfei.com/

Sophia Li is a Chinese American journalist, film director and environmental advocate who lives in Brooklyn and Upstate New York.

== Early life and education ==
Sophia Li was born in Minnesota, United States. She lived in the province of Shandong, China for two years before she came back to Minnesota before pre-school. She graduated in 2013 from Virginia Commonwealth University with a Bachelor of Arts from the Department of Fashion Design and Merchandising.

== Career ==
She worked as Entertainment Media Editor in Vogue for four years until 2017, when she went freelance. She also became co-founder of a television show about climate change named "All of the Above" with Céline Semaan Vernon which is aired on YouTube and its website. They met at an event of HER where Li was a co-host with Babba Riveira and Semaan as the guest. At the same time, Li was also invited to become a board member of Slow Factory Foundation where Semaan became the founder. Apart from being a member of Slow Factory, Li also became a board member of Better Shelter.

She also became a host of the podcast "Climate talks" on Meta Platforms.

== Honour ==
Li was named as one of sixteen climate influencers to watch in 2022 by Harvard Medical School Center for Health and the Global Environment partnered with Pique Action.
