= Chris Wang (actor) =

Taiwanese actor, model, singer and writer

- 王宥勝
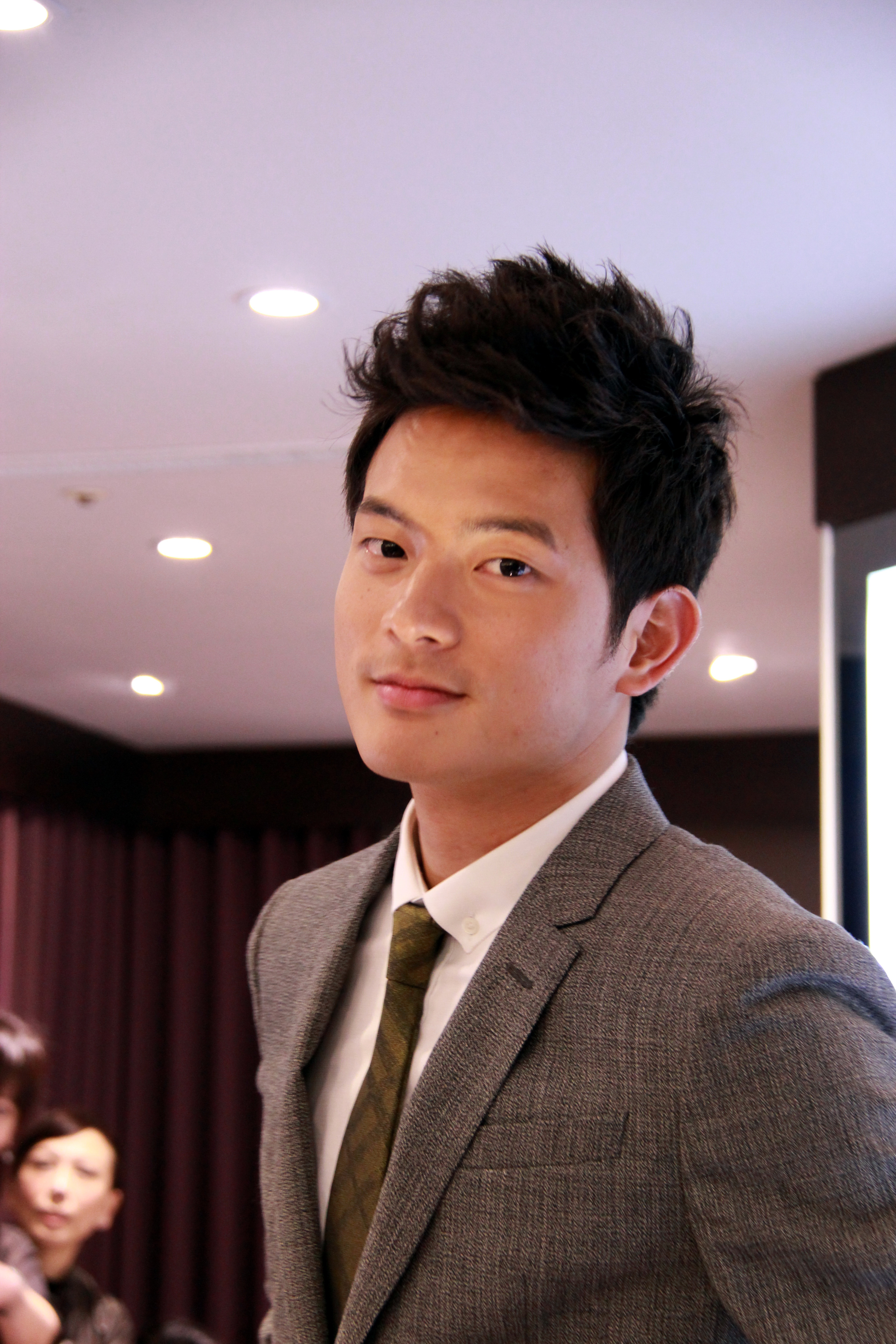
- Wang in 2012
- Born: 9 June 1982 (age 44); Taipei, Taiwan
- Education: National Central University (BA)
- Occupations: Actor; model; singer; writer
- Years active: 2008–present
- Children: 2
- Musical career
- Also known as: Yu Sheng
- Label: Ocean Butterflies Music Co. Ltd (2012–present)

Chris Wang or Wang You-sheng (Chinese: 王宥勝; pinyin: Wáng Yòu Shèng; Pe̍h-ōe-jī: Ông Iū-sèng; born 9 June 1982) is a Taiwanese actor, model, singer and writer. He previously went by the stage name Wang Yu-xiang (王郁翔). He got his start in show business when hosting the popular Taiwanese travel show The King of Adventure.

== Career ==
Wang attended New Taipei Municipal Yong-Ping High School. He has a degree in finance from National Central University. During college, he took a job in Australia for the summer and biked across the desert. After he returned to Taiwan, he saw the international-travel show "The King of Adventure" was looking for a new host, and recommended himself at the show's blog site. The show's producers were impressed by him and he became the show's fourth host in 2008. When Chris had first seen the show on TV a few years before, he had shouted at his friends that he wanted to host the show someday.

He started acting in TV drama series with a role in "Lucky Days: Second Time Around", 2010's "I Love You" and then "P.S. Man". His fame rose as one of the male leads on the record-setting drama, in 2010 "The Fierce Wife", and its movie sequel, 2012 "The Fierce Wife Final Episode". He followed up with leading roles in shows such as 2011's "They Are Flying", "Inborn Pair", and 2012 "Love Me or Leave Me".

== Personal life ==
Wang dated and married his manager, Lin Yi-xian (林宜嫻), in 2015.

In 2023, Wang was accused of sexual harassment. On May 25, 2024, he was sentenced to 8 months imprisonment for sexual assault.

== Filmography ==
=== Television ===
Year	Network	Mandarin title	English title	Role	Notes
2008–2011	SETTV	冒險王	The King of Adventure	Host	
2010	TTV/SETTV	第二回合我愛你	Lucky Days	Ren Xiao Guo	
2010	TTV/SETTV	偷心大聖 P.S. 男	P.S. Man	Yu Hao	Cameo
2010	TTV/SETTV	犀利人妻	The Fierce Wife	Lan Tian Wei	
2011	CTS	飛行少年	They Are Flying	Xie Wei Lian	
2011	SETTV	真愛找麻煩	Inborn Pair	Ke Wei Xiang	
2012	TTV	我租了一個情人	Love Me or Leave Me	Fang Hao Ming	
2013	Anhui TV	面包树上的女人	Woman on the Breadfruit Tree	An Xiao Lu	
2013	SETTV	美味的想念	A Hint of You	Boyfriend	Cameo
2013	TTV	大紅帽與小野狼	Big Red Riding Hood	Physician	Cameo
2013	SETTV	有愛一家人	Love Family	Wan Sheng Ren	
2014	TVB	愛情來的時候	A Time of Love	John (Shing)	
2014	SETTV	22K夢想高飛	Aim High	Yu Qí Feng	
2015	SETTV	料理高校生	Love Cuisine	Chris	Cameo, episode 17–21

=== Film ===
Year	English title	Mandarin title	Role
2012	Bad Girls	女孩壞壞	Li Kai Jie
2012	The Fierce Wife Final Episode	犀利人妻最終回：幸福男·不難	Lan Tian Wei
2013	Hotel Transylvania	尖叫旅社	Jonathan (voice dubbing)
2014	A Time of Love	愛情來的時候	John (Shing)
2014	Twa-Tiu-Tiann	大稻埕	Jack
2014	Endless Nights in Aurora	極光之愛	
2015	Just Get Married	結婚禁行曲	Jie Sheng Zhang
2015	Maverick	菜鳥	Yeh
2016	My Egg Boy	我的蛋男情人	梅寶男友

=== Music video appearances ===
- 2010 – "Naive" 天真 by XianZi 弦子
- 2011 – "As the Winter Nights Become Warmer" 當冬夜漸暖 by Stefanie Sun 孫燕姿
- 2011 – "Thinking of Her When You're With Me" 陪我的時候想著她 by Claire Kuo 郭靜

== Discography ==
=== Studio albums ===
#	English title	Mandarin title	Release date	Label
1st	Mr. Perfect?	完美先生	11 January 2013	Ocean Butterflies Music Co. Ltd

== Published works ==
- 2009 October 30 : You Are the King of Adventure: Chris's Dream Heaven (你，就是冒險王) – ISBN 9789861791463
- 2011 October 15 : Naked, Fake (宥勝‧裸裝) – ISBN 9789758450107
- 2012 December 12 : My Challenge Is Not Perfect (挑戰我的不完美) – ISBN 9789571356952
- 2016 : 因為妳，夢想啟動：菜鳥奶爸追夢記 – ISBN 9789861794372
