= A Hint of You =

2013 Taiwanese television series

- Promo poster
- Also known as: Taste of Missing You
- 美味的想念
- Genre: Romance, Drama, Food
- Created by: Sanlih E-Television
- Written by: Xu Yun Qi 許芸齊; Huang Zheng Nan 黃正男
- Directed by: Feng Kai 馮凱; Wu Meng En 吳蒙恩
- Starring: Michael Zhang; Nana Lee; Danson Tang; Demi Yin; Jay Shih; Cindy Song; Hans Zhang
- Opening theme: A Hint of You 美味的想念 by Danson Tang
- Ending theme: Shouldn't Be Brave 不應該勇敢 by Soo Wincci
- Country of origin: Taiwan
- Original language: Mandarin
- No. of seasons: 1
- No. of episodes: 68

Production
- Producers: Guo Jian Hong 郭建宏; Zhang Man Na 張曼娜
- Production location: Taiwan
- Camera setup: Multi camera
- Running time: 60 minutes
- Production companies: Sanlih E-Television; TransWorld Production Co. 映畫傳播事業股份有限公司

Original release
- Network: SETTV
- Release: 6 March – 28 June 2013

A Hint of You (Chinese: 美味的想念; pinyin: Měi Wèi De Xiǎng Niàn) is a 2013 Taiwanese romantic television series with a food theme produced by Sanlih E-Television, starring Michael Zhang, Nana Lee, Danson Tang, Demi Yin, Jay Shih, Cindy Song and Hans Zhang as the main cast. The Chinese title literally translates to "Taste of Missing You". Filming began on February 14, 2013 and completed on June 25, 2013, the drama was filmed as it aired. First original broadcast began on March 6, 2013 on SETTV, airing on weekdays from 9:00-10:00 pm, with the last of the 68 episodes aired on June 28, 2013. This is SETTV's last drama to air during its weekday 9:00-10:00 pm timeslot before it was obsoleted to air variety programs instead.

== Synopsis ==
Xia Qing You works as a cook at her small family owned seafood restaurant that was started by her late father. She is unaware that the dishes she creates are subpar, until Fu Zai Yu dines at her restaurant one evening and harshly criticizes her cooking. Not taking his comments well, she, her family and regular patrons at the restaurant out number Zai Yu in his argument. One day a VIP customer who was a regular patron of her father reserves the entire restaurant and pays top dollars to taste a lobster dish he had eaten when her dad was running the restaurant. After tasting Qing You's dishes he is not happy and starts comparing her father's cooking to hers, he also tells her that her level of cooking will eventually put the restaurant out of business. After finding out that her father was once a chef at the high end Hana Japanese Restaurant, she decides to dine there to have a taste of their food. At Hana she runs into Zai Yu, who is the head chef at the restaurant. He cooks her his signature egg friend rice dish to show her how good food should taste like. Upon her first bite it brings her back to the taste of her father's fried rice dish. After many failed attempts at duplicating the taste of Zai Yu's dish, she begs and stalks Zai Yu to accept her as his student in order to learn how to make his fried rice dish.

== Cast ==
=== Main ===
- Michael Zhang 張勛傑 as Fu Zai Yu 傅在宇 - Male age 30
- Nana Lee 李千娜 as Xia Qing You 夏青柚 - Female age 27
- Danson Tang 唐禹哲 as Du Huai An 杜懷安 - Male age 26
- Demi Yin 茵芙 as Xia Yi Huan 夏以歡 - Female age 25
- Jay Shih as Sun Tian Hao 孫天皓 - Male age 27
- Cindy Song 宋紀妍 as Song Yu Xin 宋玉欣 - Female age 26
- Hans Zhang 張翰 as Lu Zhen Ya 陸振雅 - Male age 38

=== Supporting ===
==== Lung 100 restaurant/Xia family ====
- Akio Chen 陳慕義 as Xia De 夏德 - Male age 55
- Ke Shu Qin 柯淑勤 as Xia Lin Zhao Di 夏林招弟 - Female age 50
- Ivy Shao 邵雨薇 as You Zhen Zhen 游真真 - Female age 22

==== Fu family ====
- Fu Lei 傅雷 as Fu Chang Nian 傅長年 - Male age 53
- Alice Huang 黃采儀 as Zhou Jia Mei 周家梅 - Female age 51

==== Song family ====
- Don Wong 王道 as Song Si Qi 宋斯祺 - Male age 54
- Fang Wen-lin 方文琳 as Zhang Wan Wan 張婉婉 / Ke Meng Rong 柯孟容 - Female age 49
- Denny Huang 黃柏鈞 as Song Yu Zong 宋玉宗 - Male age 22

==== Hana Japanese restaurant staff ====
- Huang Wei Ting 黃薇渟 as Wang Mei Xiang 王美香 - Female age 22
- Kevin Zhou 周凱文 as Lian Wen Xiang 連文翔 - Male age 27
- Vincent Qiu 邱俊儒 as Jin Zhong Gang 金仲剛 - Male age 30
- Chen Jia Hao 陳嘉豪 as Guo Wei Cheng 郭偉成 - Male age 32
- Josh Lu 陸侲曦 as Chen Kai Xi 陳凱曦 - Male age 20

==== Extended ====
- Tsai Ming-hsiu as Driver 司機
- Lucas Luo 駱炫銘) as Dong Dong 東東
- Calvin Lee 地球 as Wang Zai 旺仔
- Dou Fei 杜霏 as Boss Tsai 蔡老師
- Zhao Shun 趙舜 as Mr. Tu 涂先生
- Shen Chang Hung 沈昶宏 as young Zai Yu 小在宇
- Vent Teng 鄧志鴻 as Guo Seng 高桑
- Liu Er-chin as General Manager 總經理
- Baebae Lin 林采欣 as Rebecca
- Chen Sui-yi 陳隨意 as Ah Siu Se 阿水師

==== Guest star ====
- Chris Wang 宥勝 as Zai Yu's friend
- Summer Meng 孟耿如 as Zai Yu's friend
- Alan Kuo 柯有倫 as Alan Zai Yu's friend
- Jolie Cheng 程潔莉 as Zai Yu's friend
- Ting Chiang 丁強 as Boss Lin 林老闆
- George Chang 張兆志 as Host 主持人
- Cherry Hsia 夏如芝 as Marko
- Joelle Lu 陸明君 as Wang Fang Rui 王芳蕊
- Gino 宇騰 as Mr. Michellin 米奇林先生
- Jenson Tien 田家達 as Fang Rui's ex-husband 芳蕊前夫

== Soundtrack ==
A Hint of You Original TV Soundtrack (OST)

Soundtrack album by Various artists
- Released: 21 June 2013
- Genre: Mandopop
- Language: Mandarin
- Label: Avex Taiwan Inc.

A Hint of You Original TV Soundtrack (OST) (美味的想念 電視原聲帶) was released on June 21, 2013 by various artists under Avex Taiwan Inc. record label. It contains 14 tracks total, in which 6 tracks are instrumental versions of the original songs. The opening theme is track 2 "A Hint of You 美味的想念 " by Danson Tang, while the closing theme is track 1 "Shouldn't Be Brave 不應該勇敢" by Soo Wincci.

=== Track listing ===
No.	Title	Singer(s)	Length
1.	"Shouldn't Be Brave" (不應該勇敢)	Soo Wincci 蘇盈之	4:24
2.	"A Hint of You" (美味的想念)	Danson Tang 唐禹哲	3:29
3.	"I Don't Know, Love" (我不懂,愛)	Ryan Ding 丁衣凡	3:51
4.	"Wait For Love" (等待愛)	Nico An 安晨妤	3:20
5.	"Sun" (太陽)	Min Hsiung 民雄	4:45
6.	"Without Me, You Okay?" (沒有我,你過的好嗎?)	Danson Tang 唐禹哲	4:17
7.	"Can't Hide" (藏不住)	By2	3:51
8.	"Pride and Prejudice" (傲慢與偏見)	Soo Wincci 蘇盈之	4:33
9.	"Shouldn't Be Brave (Qing Zi warm ver.)" (不應該勇敢 (柚子 溫馨版))	Instrumental	3:05
10.	"I Don't Know, Love (Tian Hao confessions ver.)" (我不懂,愛 (天皓 告白版))	Instrumental	2:22
11.	"Sun ( An Huan his ver.)" (太陽 (安靜 吉他版))	Instrumental	2:42
12.	"Wait For Love (Zai Yu frustrated ver.)" (等待愛 (在宇 失意版))	Instrumental	3:01
13.	"Without Me, You Okay? (Huai An romantic ver.)" (沒有我,你過的好嗎? (懷安 浪漫版))	Instrumental	2:21
14.	"I Don't Know, Love (Crystal romantic ver.)" (我不懂,愛 (水晶 浪漫版))	Instrumental	3:16

== Broadcast ==
Network	Country	Airing Date	Timeslot
SETTV	Taiwan	March 6, 2013	Monday to Friday 9:00-10:00 pm
ETTV	Taiwan	March 6, 2013	Monday to Friday 11:00 pm –12:00 am
Astro Quan Jia HD	Malaysia	July 6, 2013	Saturday 1:00-5:30 pm
StarHub TV	Singapore	May 27, 2013	Monday to Friday 7:00-8:00 pm
TVB J2	Hong Kong	February 6, 2015	Monday to Friday 7:30-8:30 am
Amarin TV	Thailand	September 10, 2015	Monday to Friday 2:00-3:30 pm

== Episode ratings ==
Competing dramas on rival channels airing at the same time slot were:
- TTV – Beauties of The Emperor, Legend of the Military Seal, New Legend of Madame White Snake, The Return of the Condor Heroes
- SET - The Heart of Women
- FTV – Feng Shui Family
- CTS – Xuan-Yuan Sword: Scar of Sky, Heroes in Sui and Tang Dynasties, HERO, The Empire Warrior, Desperate Love
- CTV - Legend of The God of Doctor Xi Lai Le, Chinese Detective, Mu Guiying Command, Three Kingdoms

Air Date	Episodes	Weekly Average Ratings	Rank
6–7 March 2013	1-2	1.00	4
11–14 March 2013	3-6	1.14	3
18–21 March 2013	7-10	1.25	3
25–28 March 2013	11-14	1.41	3
01-4 April 2013	15-18	1.73	3
08-11 April 2013	19-22	1.60	4
15–18 April 2013	23-26	1.54	4
22–25 April 2013	27-30	1.53	4
29 April-2 May 2013	31-34	1.42	3
06-9 May 2013	35-38	1.41	3
13–16 May 2013	39-42	1.62	3
20–23 May 2013	43-46	1.44	3
27–30 May 2013	47-50	1.57	3
03-6 June 2013	51-54	1.62	3
10–13 June 2013	55-58	1.89	3
17–21 June 2013	59-63	1.74	3
24–28 June 2013	64-68	2.19	3
Average ratings		1.56	

== Awards and nominations ==
The 2013 Sanlih Drama Awards Ceremony were held on December 28, 2013 at Sanlih's headquarters and broadcasting studios at No. 159, Section 1, Jiuzong Rd, Neihu District Taipei City, Taiwan.

Year	Ceremony	Category	Nominee	Result
2013	2013 Sanlih Drama Awards 華劇大賞	Viewers Choice Drama Award	A Hint of You	Nominated
2013	2013 Sanlih Drama Awards 華劇大賞	Best Actor Award	Micheal Zhang	Nominated
2013	2013 Sanlih Drama Awards 華劇大賞	Best Actress Award	Nana Lee	Nominated
2013	2013 Sanlih Drama Awards 華劇大賞	Best Screen Couple Award	Micheal Zhang & Nana Lee	Nominated
2013	2013 Sanlih Drama Awards 華劇大賞	Best Kiss Award	Micheal Zhang & Nana Lee	Nominated
2013	2013 Sanlih Drama Awards 華劇大賞	Best Foolishly Award	Ke Shu-qin	Won
2013	2013 Sanlih Drama Awards 華劇大賞	Best Foolishly Award	Fang Wen-lin	Nominated
