= Min-Sheng General Hospital =

Hospital in Taoyuan District, Taoyuan City, Taiwan

Min-Sheng General Hospital 敏盛綜合醫院

Geography
- Location: Taoyuan District, Taoyuan City, Taiwan
- Coordinates: 25°00′58.9″N 121°18′23.0″E

Organisation
- Type: Hospital

Services
- Beds: 600

Links
- Website: www.missioncare.com.tw

The Min-Sheng General Hospital (Chinese: 敏盛綜合醫院; pinyin: Mǐnshèng Zònghé Yīyuàn) is a tertiary hospital in Taoyuan District, Taoyuan City, Taiwan.

== History ==
Min-Sheng General Hospital was founded by Dr. Yang Min-Sheng in 1975. A doctor at National Taiwan University Hospital (NTUH), Yang wanted to bring to his home town of Taoyuan the quality of care for which many inhabitants of the city had to travel to Taipei.

The hospital has grown from a 17-bed dispensary to become a state-of-the-art 600-bed tertiary facility offering the complete range of medical services. Min-Sheng General Hospital still has close links with NTUH to which it refers transplant patients and exchanges physicians for cross-training. More than 80% of its physicians graduated from the prestigious university.

Min-Sheng General Hospital specializes in minimally invasive surgeries and was one of the first hospitals in Asia to set up a center dedicated to endoscopic procedures. In 1997 the hospital was incorporated into MissionCare Inc., to generate the capital necessary for its expansion. The hospital's Ching Kuo Campus is now at the center of the MissionCare group of six hospitals, four long-term care centers, as well as hospital consulting, management and logistics companies.

=== Ching-Kuo Campus Building ===
The current Min-Sheng General Hospital building was officially opened for service in 2001. This new building has twenty floors above ground (the elevators indicate twenty-three floors; the fourth, ninth and thirteenth floor do not exist to reflect Chinese customs and superstitions) and seven floors underground. It has a surface of 76,000 square meters. On the hospital's grounds is a garden which design incorporates elements of Chinese Feng Shui such as water fountains and curved walls.

In 2007, the management of Min-Sheng General Hospital sold the Ching-Kuo building to ING Life Taiwan in what is still the first and only "sell and lease back" transaction of this kind for a hospital in Asia. The proceeds of this sale have enabled MissionCare, the group to which the hospital belongs, to finance its expansion and acquisitions.

== Accreditations and international healthcare ==
In 2006 Min-Sheng General Hospital started seeking to raise its international profile to showcase its offerings to international patients traveling abroad for surgical procedures. A healthcare center was set up to deal with international patients and reach referral agreements with international medical travel facilitators, and the hospital kicked off the process to obtain international accreditations and certifications. Min-Sheng Hospital is trying to position itself as an international center of excellence for bariatric, joints reconstruction and spine scoliosis surgery.

It became the first hospital (2006) in Taiwan to be accredited by Joint Commission International (JCI), the international arm of Joint Commission Resources, the body that accredits hospitals in the U.S.A. The hospital subsequently pursued and obtained certifications for its Acute Myocardial Infarction (2008), Diabetes Mellitus Type II (2009), and Chronic Kidney Disease (2009) programs.

Min-Sheng General Hospital has of late 2011 voluntarily withdrawn from JCI accreditation. It is currently not accredited by any recognised international accreditation scheme.

== See also ==
- Healthcare in Taiwan
- List of hospitals in Taiwan
