= J2 (New Zealand TV channel) =

- Broadcast area: New Zealand

Programming
- Picture format: 16:9 (anamorphic)

Ownership
- Owner: Juice TV

History
- Launched: 2001 (original); 2 December 2025 (relaunch)
- Closed: 11 November 2014 (original)
- Former names: 63

Links
- Website: JuiceTV.com

J2 is a New Zealand jukebox television channel that featured music targeted at an older audience. It played music spanning many decades and genres and was aimed at capturing audiences that would be put off by the programming on other music channels such as C4, its parent Juice TV and MTV. It was owned and operated by Juice TV and was carried on the SKY Television network from 2001 until 2014.

On May 1, 2008, it was re-branded from J2 to 63 — Our Music TV. On May 1, 2013, it reverted to the original name J2 due to its number being reassigned to Sky sporting channels. The channel stopped broadcasting on Sky TV from November 11, 2014. The channel resumed its operations on 2 December 2025, as part of a realignment of Sky's offer, replacing MTV 80s.
