= K One =

Taiwanese boy band

- Origin: Taiwan
- Genres: Pop
- Years active: 2003–2007
- Labels: J-Star (2003-2006); Wingman (2006-2008)
- Members: Gino; JR; Darren; Neo; Kido

K One was a Taiwanese boy band. The five-member band was formed in 2003 and disbanded in 2008.

== History ==
K One belongs to the management company, Wingman, managed by former 5566 member, Rio Peng. Other artists that belong to this company include 劉耕宏Will Liu, Evonne Hsu許慧欣 (eVonne), Ivy (許嘉凌, eVonne's sister), Alicia(潘瑋儀), Vivi (夏如芝), Niki, 無限(Freddy and Teddy), Wing, Style (浩偉and宏霖), and育緯.

The band was founded in 2002. It collaborated with five agents and five record companies during its existence. The band members are Tsai Shang Fu ("Gino") (Chinese: 蔡尚甫), Chiang Chun Jui (Chinese: 江峻銳), Chien Hsiao Ju (Chinese: 江峻銳), Hsiao Li Yang (Chinese: 蕭立揚), and Cheng Jen Hao (Chinese: 鄭人豪).

Gino (Chinese: 蔡尚甫) was the group's leader. For the TV series Top on The Forbidden City in which K One members starred, the band in 2004 published a soundtrack album bearing the same name. The album had strong sales. The group topped G-Music's Mandarin Chart in July 2005 and topped two other charts. According to Apple Daily, "this proves that although the idol product revision strategy has always been criticized by fans, there are still many people who buy it". Eastday in 2005 called K One "Taiwan's most electronic dance music group". The band released their second album Love Power (Chinese: 勇敢去愛) on 13 May 2005.

The group released their third album, Love Story of Romeo & Juliet (Chinese: 羅密歐與茱麗葉), in 2006. Owing to problems like the songs initially being criticised and business issues, the album's planned release date of February 2006 was revised to October of that year. They filmed the music videos for the songs "If there was no tomorrow" (Chinese: 如果沒有明天) and "Look into my eyes" at Linkou District. The songs infuse elements of dance music, classical music, and hip hop. In 2008, Sina Entertainment said that K One "has a high popularity in Taiwan" and did not visit the mainland much though they visited a Chongqing Broadcasting Group show called Entertainment Star Factory (Chinese: 娛樂星工廠) that year.

With five people splitting the profits, it was difficult to operate especially with the members doing side jobs. K One disbanded in 2008. In interviews in 2015 and 2016, Gino said the group members were incompatible and said JR insisted on keeping his career in Taiwan and did not want to join the group in performing in mainland China.

== Members ==
Stage name		Birth name		Date of birth
English	Chinese	Romanized	Chinese	Date of birth
Gino		Tsai Shang Fu	蔡尚甫	January 30, 1980 (age 46)
Darren	達倫	Chiang Chun Jui	江峻銳	March 23, 1982 (age 44)
JR		Chien Hsiao Ju	簡孝儒	November 5, 1985 (age 40)
Neo	立揚	Hsiao Li Yang	蕭立揚	November 1, 1978 (age 47)
Kido		Cheng Jen Hao	鄭人豪	June 16, 1982 (age 44)

== Timeline ==
2003

This 5-man dance group, K One, was formed by Rio Peng, with his company Corvette Entertainment (the name Corvette was later abandoned in 2006 in favour of Wingman Entertainment). However, K One did not do well with their first album; a very likely reason is that Peng did not wish to involve his own artistes with 5566, hoping that K One would make a name for themselves. Another possible reason is that there was already another popular dance group, Energy, in existence; due to this, few people were excited about the arrival of K One. However, Peng ultimately did place K One with Jungiery the following year.

2004

After K One was placed under Jungiery, they were soon put to act in the idol drama, Top on the Forbidden City 紫禁之巔. This idol drama had a lead cast roster of Gino and JR, and Joanne from the girl group Sweety. To help up this drama's fame, Sam Wang from 5566 also played a supporting role in the drama, and the theme song for this drama, Twist The Fate 风云变色, was a collaborated work by both 5566 and K-One. This strategy was once again successful; K One's fame rose sharply.

2005

Their book Heaven and Hell came out January 30, on Gino's birthday. Their second album Love Power 勇敢去愛 came out in May. Darren acts in Mr. Fighting 格鬥天王 with 5566 and Sweety. Gino acts in The Prince Who Turns into a Frog 王子變青蛙 with 183 Club and 7 Flowers. Kido acts in Green Forest, My Home 綠光森林 with Sweety and Leon Jay Williams. JR acts in Bear Family Physicians (Dr. Da Xiong) 大熊醫師家 with 謝祖武 and 寇乃馨. Other members acts in here for a few episodes.

2006

Their contract ended with Jungiery and they decided to go back to Wingman. Third album Love Story of Romeo and Juliet 愛的故事-羅密歐與朱利葉 came out in October. Gino and Darren acts in Smiling Pasta 微笑Pasta with Cyndi Wang, Nicholas Teo, and 7 Flowers' Joyce Zhao (Xiao Qiao). Li Yang acts in Star Apple Garden (Legend of Star Apple) 星蘋果樂園 with Matthew Ming Dao from 183 Club, Achel Chang, and Evonne Hsu. Darren is a cameo in here.

2007

K One's fourth anniversary. Their album Beautiful Commemoration 美好 紀念日 came out in their anniversary month, October. Wingman first CD, Wingman 2007 翼之星 2007, came out with all their singers in it and former 55666 member Rio Peng, the boss. Also their single The King's Way 王道 came out in November. JR acts in Kendo Love 劍道愛 with Evan Yo and Yang Ya Zhu 杨雅筑. Darren acts in a movie, Island Etude 练习曲, with Tung Ming Hsiang.

2008

Gino acts in Home 民視娘家 but only for a few minutes.

2009

JR acts in a movie called Feng Lin Volcano 風林火山 with Ivy. Gino acts in Easy Fortune Happy Life 福氣又安康 with Joe Chen Qiao En from 7 Flowers and Blue Lan Cheng Long. Gino acts in Happy Together 青梅竹馬 with 楊一展 Leroy (Weber) Yang, 洪小鈴 Jennifer Hong, and 林韋君 Penny Lin.

== Discography ==
Studio albums

- We r K One (2003)
- Love Power (2005)
- Love Story of Romeo & Juliet (2006)
- Beautiful Commemoration (2007)

Singles

- The King's Way (2007)

== Filmography ==
=== Dramas ===
- Top of the Forbidden City 紫禁之巔- All Members
- Mr. Fighting 格鬥天王 - Darren
- The Prince Who Turns into a Frog 王子變青蛙 - Gino
- Green Forest, My Home 綠光森林 - Kido
- Bear Family Physicians (Dr. Da Xiong)(Home Of Dr. Big Bear) 大熊醫師家 - JR / other members (few episode)
- Smiling Pasta 微笑Pasta - Gino, Darren
- Star Apple Garden (Legend of Star Apple) 星蘋果樂園- Li Yang, Darren(cameo)
- Kendo Love 劍道愛- JR
- Home 娘家 - Gino (one short part in an episode. search title with Gino's name and you'll find it)
- Easy Fortune Happy Life 褔气又安康 - Gino
- Happy Together 青梅竹馬 - Gino
- 巔峰時代 - Gino (not out yet)
- 男生宿舍的女生 - Gino

＊狮子的女儿－Gino ＊真爱林北－JR

=== Movie ===
- Island Etude 练习曲 - Darren
- Feng-Lin Volcano 風林火山 - JR

=== Host ===
- 明星隨身碟 - All members
- 超級童盟會 - All members
- 亞洲電臺 翼想星空 - Li Yang and Kido
- 音乐集结号 - Gino, JR, and Li Yang
- 快樂有GO正 - Gino and JR
- 综艺大喝彩 - Gino and JR
- 完全娛樂 - JR (other four members have hosted as substitute host)
- 愛風潮 - JR
- 瘋狂Lucky9 - JR
- 明星IFUN電 - Darren
- 愛打電玩 - Gino

=== Commercials ===
- Qma 手机 (2003) on YouTube - All members
- 蝦味先 (2007) on tudou.com - All members
