= 5566 =

Taiwanese boy band

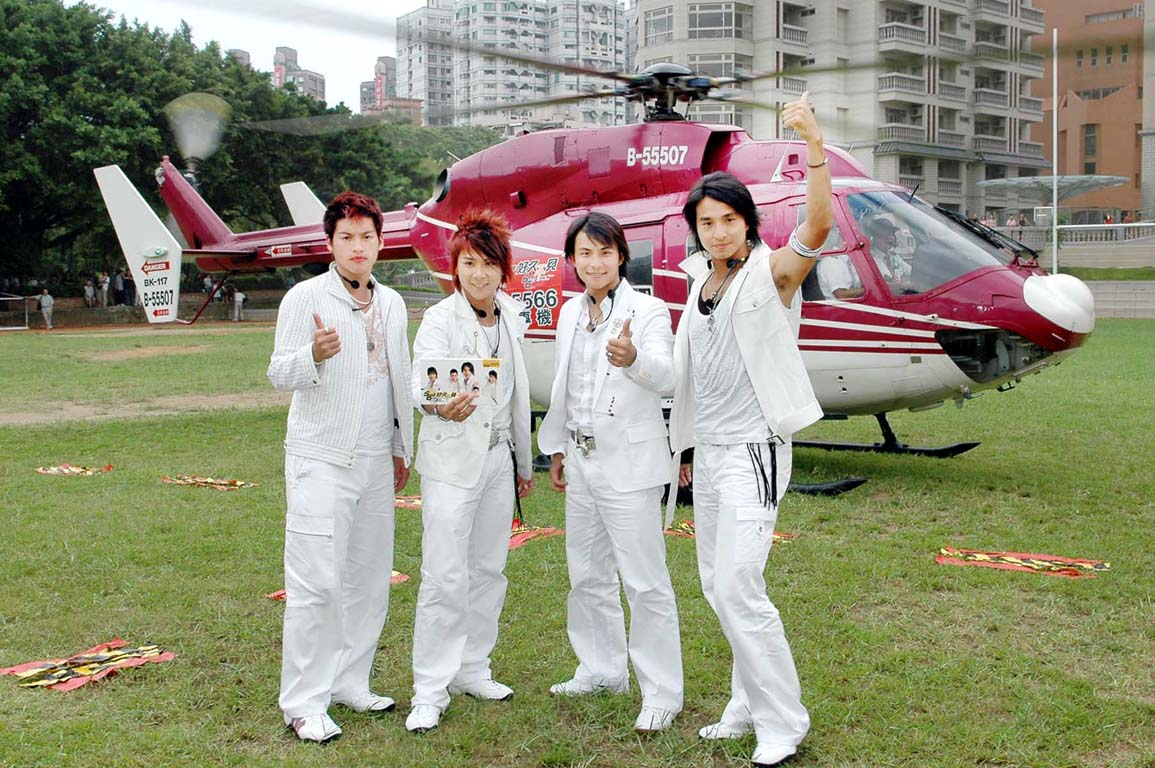

Background information
- Origin: Taipei, Taiwan
- Genres: Mandopop
- Years active: 2002–2008; 2014; 2016; 2019; 2021
- Labels: Avex Taiwan (2002–2004); Warner Music Group (2005–2008); Jungiery (Management)
- Members: Tony Sun; Jason Hsu; Zax Wang
- Past members: Rio Peng; Sam Wang
- Website: www.j-star.com.tw

5566 was a Taiwanese boy band, formed under Taiwanese music company, J-Star. The name is derived from their original five members (Zax Wang, Jason Hsu, Sam Wang, Rio Peng and band leader Tony Sun), working in six entertainment fields (singing, movies and dramas, hosting, modelling, commercials, and dancing). Over the course of their career, they have starred in three idol dramas: My MVP Valentine, Westside Story, and Mr. Fighting. They have also released four albums: 1st Album, Boyfriend, Long Time No See, and Bravo; two compilation albums: C'est Si Bon Greatest Hits, I Love 56 - Re-emerging Legends: 5 Years Greatest Hits; and taken part in four OSTs: My MVP Valentine OST, Westside Story soundtrack, Mr. Fighting OST, and Ying Ye 3 Jia 1.

5566 disbanded in 2008, but occasionally reunited in 2014, 2016 and 2019.

== Grouping ==
5566 not only work together as a group, but also individually. For instance, Sam Wang is famous for his appearances in many TV series as well as his membership in another company's band called 183 Club, which effectively makes him the busiest 5566 member; Tony Sun and Zax Wang often have dramas to shoot; while Jason Hsu has been featured in many local promotional campaigns. Zax Wang and Jason Hsu are also hosts of SETTV's entertainment show, Showbiz (完全娛樂 / Wan Quan Yu Le) (2002–2011). 5566 as a group has hosted TTV's Young Guns (少年特攻隊 / Shao Nian Te Gong Dui) (2002–2007) and CTS's Dou Zhen Ju Le Bu (鬥陣俱樂部) (2004–2005). Additionally, leader Tony Sun is also known to take part in a lot of the behind-the-scenes work at Jungiery. The Hunger Games, Hosted by them (2017 -?).

== History ==
=== Pre-debut ===
Tony Sun has gained much solo experience by releasing several well-received albums in the Taiwanese dialect in the 1990s; he even gained the title of the "Taiwanese little champion". However, his popularity waned when he had to fulfill his mandatory military service. Sun was signed under Jungiery since his earlier days; this was how he used his connection with the company to secure the second part of his career.

Zax Wang was a member of short-lived boyband POSTM3N. After the group disbanded, he was planning to start a cellphone shop with a colleague when Sun De Rong, Jungiery's head, contacted him. Wang took up the deal.

Sam Wang was a national soccer player and a model before signing with Jungiery. He is also a member of another Jungiery boyband 183 Club.

Jason Hsu was originally obese and unpopular in school. However, he started appearing in several commercials when he successfully lost weight, giving him the looks of an idol. He was also a model. Jungiery offered him a contract, and he gladly accepted.

Rio Peng was known as Xiao Dao. He was playing at My MVP Valentine with another member, too.

=== 2002: Popularity Rise ===
5566 was formed on 21 January 2002 by manager Sun De Rong (also known as Sun Zhong).

5566's debut and sudden rise to popularity has been a controversial topic. They showcased their multiple talents in their debut interview, yet their hard work was not respected, drawing much criticism and earning them a negative nickname, "Turkey", which is still used today. This continued until their first idol drama, aired on local television. The drama, featuring 5566 in the lead roles, exceeded expectations by having a higher viewership rating than several other idol dramas during that season. Not only did this drama help skyrocket 5566 to fame, it was also the driving force behind the careers of Angela Chang and Yen Hsing-su.

Due to a serious injury that he suffered during the filming of a variety show, Rio Peng was temporary pulled out from group activities to recover. Although the remaining 5566 members confirmed that Peng was still part of the group, Peng would eventually leave the group, forming his own management company, Wingman Entertainment.

In December, 5566 released their first album, which sold 240,000 copies in Taiwan. However, ever since the album was re-released in two additional versions, 5566 would become infamous for regularly repackaging their albums. This holds true till today; the Westside Story soundtrack and the Top on the Forbidden City OST are the only two albums that remain unrepackaged.

=== 2003: Westside Story and Peng's Departure ===
Promotional activity for their first album continued during the first few months of this year. When activities ended, 5566 temporarily bade farewell to their home country for overseas promotion in Southeast Asia. After this was finished, 5566 began work for their second idol drama, Westside Story. This drama was also well-received, and the Westside Story soundtrack complimented the drama nicely, faring well on the music charts.

2003 also saw the start of Jungiery's marketing strategy, which was to utilize 5566's fame to increase the popularity of other Jungiery artists. This was seen on the Westside Story soundtrack album, where a song by the now-defunct bubblegum-pop group R&B and a duet between Tony Sun and Cyndi Wang were included. Both R&B and Cyndi Wang became well-known artistes almost instantly.

Rio Peng, with his company Corvette Entertainment (the name Corvette was later abandoned in 2006 in favour of Wingman), formed and managed a dance group K One.

=== 2004: Top on the Forbidden City and In Love With A Rich Girl ===
In 2004 Sam Wang played a supporting role in the drama Top on the Forbidden City. The theme song for this drama, "Twist The Fate", was a collaboration between 5566 and the group managed by Peng, K-One. During the period "Top on the Forbidden City" was aired, 5566 began advertising for the 7-Eleven convenience store chain. 7-Eleven released special junk food and instant food varieties based on 5566's own ideas. 5566 recorded a short jingle, C'est Si Bon, to aid this campaign.

After "Top on the Forbidden City" was finished, Sam Wang joined a new group called 183 Club, which fame eventually rivaled 5566 in China.

The same year, 5566 released their first compilation album, C'est Si Bon Greatest Hits. This compilation featured songs from their previous three works, and three new songs, one of which was the re-recorded full version of C'est Si Bon, which also featured 7 Flowers. The song was initially only a jingle for the 7-11 advertisement. By popular demand, verses were newly written and composed to make a full song. The ending of promotions of this Greatest Hits album also signaled the end of 5566's core activities for the year.

2004 is also the year in which member Jason Hsu starred in his own TV series / idol drama, In Love With A Rich Girl. The other three 5566 members were featured as special guest stars in episode one.

=== 2005: Mr. Fighting and Long Time No See ===
5566 sprang to an early start in 2005 with their new idol drama, Mr. Fighting. Unexpectedly, both the drama and the OST did not do as well as expected. Many thought 5566 was beginning to lose their grip on the entertainment industry. Jungiery's manager, seeming to notice this and fearing that the whole J-Star group would collapse if their main pillar fell with no backups for support, then decided to shift his attention to 183 Club. After this drama, problems between Avex Taiwan and Jungiery arose, and Jungiery defected to Warner Music.

5566 also released their third album this year, Long Time No See. This album was also 5566's first musical work released under the Warner Music label. This album featured more of Tony Sun's vocals, as there were complaints that Zax Wang's vocals were featured too much in their second album. Despite this, the above-mentioned decline and many fans' voicing a deterioration of quality slightly dented the album's performance.

=== 2006: Hiatus ===
2006 was a hiatus year for 5566's activities. Tony Sun and Zax Wang both went to Mainland China to film their own dramas; Sam Wang along with 183 Club starred in idol drama The Magicians of Love which aired early in the year, and released an album during the summer; Jason Hsu at first stayed in Taiwan to attend various promotional campaigns, as he was still studying. Later on, Jason starred in the movie, My Sassy Teacher, and also went to the Philippines to play a role in the series, Captain Barbell.

On November 19, Zax Wang's daughter was born. She is affectionately known to the public as "Le Le". Le Le's mother is Taiwanese entertainer Ji Qin.

5566 took part in the 41st Golden Bell Awards as award presenters and performed various songs from their OSTs.

=== 2007: Love Miracle 3 ===
To kick the year off, 5566, along with Jungiery, released a new compilation album in the Love Miracle series, Love Miracle 3. This compilation, following the tradition, included some new songs as well as selected older songs. 5566 recorded two new songs for this album, On Fire (also the Chinese theme song for the Ghost Rider film), and Red Youth Is Knocking. Jungiery martial arts group Tai Chi collaborated with 5566 in the music video of On Fire. The same group had previously collaborated with 5566 in the song "One World One Dream" from their third album, both vocally and visually.

In May, 5566 released a special compilation album titled I Love 56 - Re-emerging Legends: 5 Years Greatest Hits. This album did not feature any new songs and was exclusively released in the Mainland China area.

2007 was a year in which all of 5566's members appeared as lead actors in their own individual dramas. In February, Zax Wang co-starred with Taiwanese singer Pace Wu in the drama Shi Shen (God of Cookery). The other three members made their appearances one after another in the later half of the summer holidays: Jason Hsu co-starred with "Prince-Frog Couple" Ming Dao and Joe Chen in idol drama Ying Ye 3 Jia 1 (Ying Ye 3+1); Tony Sun starred in the Taiwan-Mainland-Hong Kong collaboration martial arts drama The Sword and the Chess of Death; and Sam Wang starred in idol drama E Nü Ah Chu (Mean Girl A Chu). Tony also starred in a new idol drama titled Full Count (Ai Qing, Liang Hao San Huai) during fall.

On November 24, 5566 attended the 42nd Golden Bell Awards. They were award presenters like in the previous year, but did not perform.

=== 2008: Bravo ===
5566 kicked off the new year with their fourth studio album, Bravo, which hit shelves on January 4 in Taiwan, and January 8 in Mainland China, Singapore and Malaysia regions. The title song, Bravo (喝采 / He Cai), was themed towards the 2008 Beijing Olympic Games. Five hundred fans attended the first autograph session in Taiwan, but more than 1000 fans attended their first ever autograph session in Hong Kong, on January 27, 2008. Furthermore, their songs Bravo (喝采 / He Cai), Roaming In China (漫游中國 / Man You Zhong Guo), and Bright Moon (月兒光光 / Yue Er Guang Guang) have successfully made their way into Singapore's music charts. While 5566's fame slowly rises in Asia, Sun De Rong, 5566's manager, has also openly stated plans to slowly withdraw from the Taiwan market and increase focus on the Mainland China market.

5566 dubbed the Chinese version of Animal Planet's Animal Winter Olympics, also in January. The program aired on February 9 & 10, respectively.

5566 was invited to The Olympics 100-Day Countdown celebration on April 30 in Beijing, China. They performed the song (英雄 / Hero) with Chris Yu, which was also the composer of the song. 5566 also performed "Beijing Welcomes You" with other 100 singers in front of the Forbidden City in Beijing, China. 5566 also took part in the recording and music video of the official Olympics song, "Beijing Welcomes You", along with 100 other artistes from China, Hong Kong, and Taiwan. (Other Taiwanese artistes who took part in the recording included Wang LeeHom, Jolin Tsai, Kenji Wu KeQun, Vivian Hsu, Fan WeiQi, Lin ZhiLing, etc.)

5566 was originally appointed to be the spokespeople to promote the Taiwan team for the Beijing Olympics. However, because of political issues, they are unable to do so.

Zax's son Yaya was born July 28, 2008, one day after Jason's birthday.

Zax and wife Ji Qin held their wedding on 11 December 2008 at Guam Island. Their children Le Le and Ya Ya were present to witness the ceremony.

=== 2010: Managing new groups ===
During November 2010, Jungiery Management held a press conference introducing three new groups. Tony Sun was revealed as the manager behind male group 7 km and girl group Wonder4, and being a member of the former; Zax Wang became leader of dance group Merry Monarc.

=== 2014 and beyond: Reunion ===
January 2014 saw the on-stage reunion of 5566 when all members, less Rio Peng, appeared as special guests at a concert of fellow Taiwanese boyband, Mayday. In the collaboration, the two bands performed a medley of 5566's and Mayday's hit tracks. Despite sparking online debates between fans of both bands, the appearance of 5566 ignited a persistent online catchphrase - 56不能亡 (5566 cannot perish) - by fans, urging for their official comeback.

Following calls for their return, 5566's comeback concerts were in the pipeline. However, the plans were eventually scrapped, reportedly due to Sam Wang's conflicting pre-existing acting schedules that hindered his availability to commit.

In October 2016, 5566 formally reunited at the 51st Golden Bell Awards, to which they were invited as special guest performers. With their return, several offers were made to the band, including an invitation to host a new Taiwanese variety show - CTV's 飢餓遊戲 (The Hunger Games). However, Sam Wang would sit out from the show due to his schedules. The three-member 5566 also headlined 2017 New Year Day's countdown ceremony held at Taichung. In 2017, The Hunger Games was nominated for the "Best Reality and Game Show" award at the 52nd Golden Bell Awards, whereas in 2018, the three members were nominated for the "Best Host for a Reality or Game Show" award at the 53rd Golden Bell Awards for their performance in The Hunger Games.

In February 2019, the three-member 5566 held their concert, titled "SINCE 5566", at the Taipei Arena (臺北小巨蛋), with Rio Peng joining in as the guest performer. Tickets to the concert reportedly sold out in 5-minutes. In July of the same year, the Singapore-arm of the concert was held at the Singapore Indoor Stadium.

== Discography ==
=== Albums ===
Chinese Title	English Title (most C-Pop releases have a Chinese title and an English title)	Notes	
MVP 情人 電視原聲帶	My MVP Valentine OST		
一光年	1st Album	First album - 2002	
西街少年 電視原聲帶	Westside Story		
摯愛	Boyfriend	Second album - 2004	
紫禁之巔 電視原聲帶	Top Of The Forbidden City OST		
最棒冠軍精選	C'est Si Bon	Featured	
格鬥天王 電視原聲帶	Mr. Fighting OST		
《愛的奇蹟 喬傑立巨星最紅偶像劇情歌精選》	Love Miracle I - Compilation Of J-star's Best OST Songs	Featured	
好久不見	Long Time No See	Third studio album - 2005	
《愛的奇蹟II 跳舞吧!	Love Miracle II - Come On Party!		
《愛的奇蹟III 搖滾萬歲》	Love Miracle III - I Love Rock And Roll		
《我愛56 - 傳說再現5年極精選》	I Love 56 - Retelling The First 5 Years	Most highly featured	
櫻野三加一 電視原聲帶	Ying Ye 3+1 OST		
喝采	Bravo	Fourth studio album - 2008	我難過

=== Dramas ===
Chinese	English translation
MVP 情人	My MVP Valentine (All Members Played as main cast of Basketball MVP Player)
麻辣鮮師	Happy Campus
海豚灣戀人 (客串)	At Dolphin Bay Episode 28 as quest star at concert (Cameo )
西街少年	Westside Story
千金百分百	100% Senorita
紫禁之巔	Top Of The Forbidden City
愛上千金美眉	In Love With A Rich Girl
格鬥天王	Mr. Fighting
王子變青蛙	Prince Who Turns Into A Frog
愛情魔髮師	The Magicians Of Love
剪刀石頭布	A Game About Love (Rock, Paper, Scissors)
食神	God Of Cookery
魔劍生死棋	The Sword And The Chess of Death
惡女阿楚	Mean Girl Ah Chu
櫻野三加一	Ying Ye 3 Jia 1
愛情，兩好三壞	Full Count
歡喜來逗陣	Your Home Is My Home
真情满天下	Love Above All／Pay it Forward／Love In The Vineyard
魔女18號	Magic 18

=== Track listings ===
1st Album is 5566's debut studio album. Released in 2002, this album not only topped the local music charts for three weeks, it also succeeded in displacing Fantasy 4 Ever, the second album of the then-reigning boyband F4, from first place. This album includes all songs from the My MVP Valentine OST that are done by 5566, as well as several new additions.

1. 槍聲 / Gunshot
2. 神話 / Myth
3. 一光年 / One Light Year
4. 無所謂 / Doesn't Matter
5. 哇沙米 / Wasabi
6. Without Your Love
7. 愛情漫遊 / Love Wander
8. 我難過 / I'm Sad
9. 跟他拼 / Go for It
10. 勇士們 / Warriors
11. 挑撥 / Instigation
12. 怎樣 / What's Up
13. 愛情漫遊 (Remix) / Love Wander (Remix)

Westside Story, the soundtrack album for the Taiwanese idol drama TV series Westside Story starring 5566. This album is credited for bringing fame to two Jungiery artists, Cyndi Wang and the now-defunct bubblegum pop group, R&B.

1. Legend - 5566
2. Final Battle
3. Set Me Free - Sam Wang
4. Wearing Down The Westside
5. HuLaHu - R&B
6. Something Is Going On
7. Enduring Long Hardships (Jian Ao)- Tony Sun and Cyndi Wang
8. Sadness Of The Westside (Instrumental for Existence)
9. Foolish Lover - Zax Wang
10. Get Out Of My Way
11. Rising Once Again
12. Charging Boundaries (Instrumental for Legend)
13. Song Of The Demons
14. Mystery Of Birth
15. Regret Of Life
16. Existence - 5566

Boyfriend is 5566's second studio album, released on January 9, 2004. The title track, Boyfriend, was the group's first attempt at an English song. Two repackages of the album were released.

1. "Easy Come Easy Go"
2. "The Last Second"
3. "Blossom"
4. "For You"
5. "Bounce" (feat. R&B)
6. "One More Try"
7. "Boyfriend"
8. "Cold Winds Passing"
9. "Right Here Waiting"
10. "Empty World"
