= J-Star =

Group of Taiwanese artistes

J-Star, short for Jungiery Star, is associated with Jungiery, a Taiwanese artiste management company. The members of J-Star include 5566, 183 Club, 7 Flowers, Typhoon, Taiji, LALA, VJ, and Cyndi Wang. R&B and K-One were also part of J-Star. Some original R&B members left Jungiery, and the remaining members were regrouped with other Jungiery trainees to form the bubblegum-pop group LALA. K-One has since returned to Wingman Entertainment.

5566 is considered the main pillar of J-Star.

== Members ==
=== Current members ===
- 5566 since 2002
- 183 Club since 2004
- 7 Flowers (七朵花) since 2004
- Cyndi Wang (王心凌) since 2003
- Typhoon* since 2004
- Taiji*
- LALA* since 2006
- VJ*
- Magic 1+1 (魔幻1+1) since 2009

=== Former Members ===
- R&B* 2003–2006
- K-One 2003–2006

== Activity ==
J-Star publishes its own magazine under the same name, "J-Star."

In 2006, J-Star formed a baseball team to compete against teams from Playboy (Korea) and Japan.

== History ==
The main manager, Sun De Rong (also known as Sun Zhong), first created the group 5566 on 21 January 2002. Other notable individuals managed by Sun De Rong include Ming Dao, Qiao En, Cyndi Wang, and Hong Qiao. Nearly two years later, R&B was formed but disbanded in 2006. Following these successes, Jungiery continued to create more groups, such as 7 Flowers and 183 Club. Individuals were also organized into various groups. Sun Zhong managed K-One, and Toro joined Jungiery and became part of the group Typhoon after leaving Energy.

In 2007, the company faced some setbacks.

== Albums ==
=== J-Star Albums ===
Chinese Title	English Title (most C-Pop releases have a Chinese title and an English title)	Notes
《愛的奇蹟 喬傑立巨星最紅偶像劇情歌精選》	Love Miracle I - Compilation Of J-star's Best OST Songs	Featured
《愛的奇蹟II 跳舞吧!	Love Miracle II - Come On Party!	
《愛的奇蹟III 搖滾萬歲》	Love Miracle III - I Love Rock And Roll	

=== 5566 Albums ===
Chinese Title	English Title (most C-Pop releases have a Chinese title and an English title)	Notes
MVP 情人 電視原聲帶	My MVP Valentine OST	
一光年	1st Album	First album - 2002
西街少年 電視原聲帶	Westside Story	
摯愛	Boyfriend	Second album
紫禁之巔 電視原聲帶	Top Of The Forbidden City OST	
最棒冠軍精選	C'est Si Bon	Featured
格鬥天王 電視原聲帶	Mr. Fighting OST	
好久不見	Long Time No See	Third studio album
《我愛56 - 傳說再現5年極精選》	I Love 56 - Retelling The First 5 Years	Most highly featured
櫻野三加一 電視原聲帶	Ying Ye 3+1 OST	
喝采	Bravo	Fourth studio album

=== 183 Club Albums ===
- Le Robe De Mariage Des Cieux (Heaven's Wedding Gown) OST (2004)
- The Prince Who Turns Into A Frog OST (2005)
- The Magicians of Love OST (2006)
- FIRST ALBUM (2006)
- Angel Lover OST (2007)

=== 7 Flowers Albums ===
- 7 Flowers (七朵花) (2 November 2005)
- Top On The Forbidden City Original TV Drama Soundtrack (2004)
- The Prince Who Turns Into a Frog Original TV Soundtrack (2005)
- The Magicians Of Love Original TV Soundtrack (2006)

=== Cyndi Wang Album ===
Album	Date of release	Title
1st	24 Feb 2003	Begin...
2nd	26 Mar 2004	Cyndi Loves You 愛你
3rd	18 Feb 2005	Honey
Best Album	26 July 2005	閃耀2005新歌+節奏精選
4th	27 Dec 2005	Cyndi with U
5th	30 Apr 2007	Magic Cyndi
6th	30 Nov 2007	Fly! Cyndi
Best Album	29 Feb 2008	Red Cyndi
