= Ming Dao =

Taiwanese actor and singer

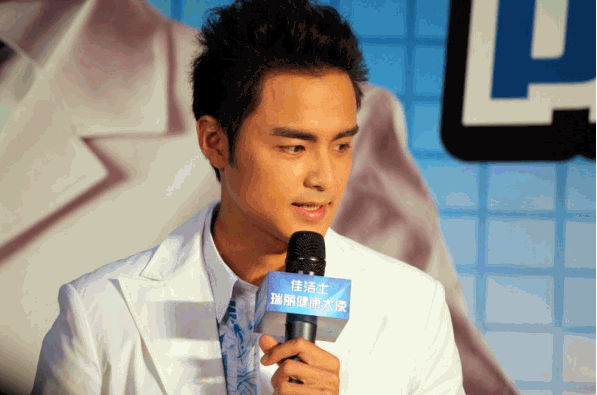
- Dao in January 2010
- Born: 林朝章; Lîm Tiâu-chiong; Lin Chao-chang; 26 February 1980 (age 46); Taipei, Taiwan
- Occupations: Actor, singer, model
- Years active: 1999–present
- Awards: Golden Bell Awards – 39th Best Host in Educational Programme; 2004 King of Adventure
- Musical career
- Also known as: Matthew Lin; Ming Dow
- Genres: Mandopop
- Formerly of: 183 Club

Ming Dao (Chinese: 明道; pinyin: Míng Dào; Pe̍h-ōe-jī: Bêng Tō; born 26 February 1980) is a Taiwanese actor, singer and model. He is known for starring in The Prince Who Turns into a Frog, which held the highest single episode average rating of 6.99 for a Taiwanese drama from 2005 to 2008, and for being the winner of Best Host in Educational Programme at the 39th Golden Bell Awards.

== Career ==
Ming Dao was first discovered in 1999 when he took part in television variety show Guess hosted by Jacky Wu on China Television. He went on to model for various advertisements and appeared in several music videos including Fei Xiang's "She" and R&B's "Love Bubble". Ming Dao also participated in Taiwanese program Super Sunday in 2000 and worked as a spokesperson for Shiatzy Chen.

Ming Dao hosted King of Adventure (冒險王) on SETTV from 2002, visiting India, Korea, Egypt, Germany, Namibia, New Zealand, Laos, Guam, Fiji, Alaska, Mexico, Oman, and Indonesia as an adventure tour guide. In 2004, Ming Dao won the Best Host in Educational Programme at the 39th Golden Bell Awards.

In 2004, he made his acting debut Heaven's Wedding Gown (天國的嫁衣) as a bike-racing champion, Chen Hai Nuo, co-starring Cyndi Wang and Leon Jay Williams. A year later, he starred in The Prince Who Turns into a Frog as Shan Jun Hao and Dang Ou. This drama is the only one in which all five members of 183 Club appeared. Episode seven broadcast on 17 July 2005 achieved an average rating of 6.99 and peaked at 8.05, which broke the previous average record of 6.43 held by Meteor Garden and was the highest peak for a single episode for a Taiwanese drama until it was broken by episode 13 of Fated to Love You which peaked at 8.13 in 2008.

In his next drama, The Magicians of Love (愛情魔髮師), he co-starred with his band mates Sam Wang, Jacky Zhu, and Ehlo Huang from 183 Club. Then in 2006, he starred in The Legend of Star Apple and Angel Lover. Followed by Ying Ye 3 Jia 1, in 2007 in which he plays Ah Jiang, opposite past co-star Joe Chen from The Prince Who Turns into a Frog. Other cast members include Jason Hsu of 5566, who plays his friend Bulu (Wang Dao Ren). Also released in 2007 was Modern Youth (梦幻天堂).

In 2008 he finished filming Knock Knock Loving You and Always Smile! in Hunan, China. In December Ming Dao and Chen Qiao En filmed Staying by You, Staying in the Sunshine/Taking of You, accompanied by the Lights, released in 2009.

He later went back to the mainland and started shooting Wuxia drama as General Wu Gang; a mainland station (Anhui TV) then contracted him as their star. He was paid to participate in the idol drama Happy and Love Forever with actress and model Annie Chen.The producer made a sequel, but Ming Dao and Annie only had cameo roles.

In 2010, Ming Dao returned to Taiwan and starred with Cheryl Yang in Zhong Wu Yan. Although he was paid a lot less, he decided to do this drama because he did not want his Taiwanese fans to be disappointed.

Ming Dao left his agency J Star and along with Miss Li, his manager, he established a new agency MID. Other artists who signed on under his agency were Gino and Anthony. He also released a pictorial book "STAR".

== Filmography ==
=== Film ===
Year	English title	Original title
2010	Close to You	近在咫尺的爱恋
2010	Life of Sentime	感情生活 2014 The Best Meeting 最好的遇见
2015	Let's Get Married	咱们结婚吧
2016	Three Bad Guys	恋爱教父之三个"坏"家伙
2017	The Missing	绑架者
2018	Let's Cheat Together	
2018	Long Day's Journey into Night	
2018	Perfect-Lover.com	
2018	Asura	

=== Television ===
Year	English title	Original title	Role	Network	Notes
2004	La robe de Mariee des cieux	天國的嫁衣	Chen Hainuo / Harold	CTS	
2005	The Prince Who Turns into a Frog	王子變青蛙	Shan Junhao / Dang O	TTV	
2006	The Magicians of Love	愛情魔髮師	Du Yasi / Du Yajun	TTV	
2006	Legend of Star Apple	星苹果乐园	Tao Si	CTV	
2006	Angel Lover	天使情人	Yang Tianyou	StarTV	
2007	Modern Youth	梦幻天堂	Zhou Jichun		
2007	Ying Ye 3 Jia 1	櫻野三加一	Yang Jiajiang	TTV	
2009	Knock Knock Loving You	敲敲愛上你	Zhao Guanxi	CTS	
2009	Let's Dance	守着阳光，守着你	Yang Rui		
2009	Always Smile!	微笑在我心	Liang Yufang	Hunan TV	
2009	Chang'e	嫦娥	Wu Gang		
2010	Happy & Love Forever	幸福一定強	Yin Dingqiang	Anhui TV	
2010	Zhong Wu Yen	鍾無艷	King Xuan of Qi	TTV	
2011	Sunny happiness	幸福最晴天	Yin Dingqiang		guest star
2011	Beauty World	唐宮美人天下	Ming Chongyan/Ming Yi	Anhui TV	
2011	Beauties of the Emperor	王的女人	Xiang Yu		
2011	Happy Michelin Kitchen	幸福三颗星	Yin Dingqiang		guest star
2012	The Queen of SOP	勝女的代價	Adam Bell	Hunan TV	guest star
2014	Hot Mom!	辣妈正传	Bao Shuai		
2014	If I Love You	如果我爱你	Adam Bell		
2015	Personal Savings	私房钱	Ying Ming		
2016	Let's Fall in Love	咱们相爱吧	Huang Shaogu	Hunan TV	
2017	Angelo	天使的幸福	An Jieluo	Hunan TV	
2024	The Legend of Heroes: Hot Blooded	金庸武侠世界之铁血丹心	Hong Qigong	Tencent Video	

== Discography ==
Album Information	Tracks Contributed
Heaven's Wedding Gown Soundtrack: Artist: Released: 2004	"Torture [Zhe Mo]"(折磨) by 183 Club
The Prince Who Turns into A Frog Soundtrack: Artist: Various Artists; Released: 2005	"Enticing Trick"(迷魂計) by 183 Club "Magical Smile"(魔法) by 183 Club "Call My Name"(閉上眼默唸3遍) by 183 Club and 7 Flowers "True Love"(真愛) by 183 Club
The Magicians of Love Soundtrack: Artist: Various Artists; Released: 2006	"Perfect Lover" (完美情人) by 183 Club "Magic Room" by 183 Club "Bomba Bomba" by 183 Club "Affected Line"(感情線) by 183 Club "A Date So Sweet"(甜蜜約定) by 183 Club
Angel Lover Soundtrack: Artist: Various Artists; Released: 2006	"Finding True Love" (發現真愛) with Jacky Chu and Ehlo Huang "Unregrettable Decision" (不後悔的決定) with Jacky Chu "Forgotten" (遺忘) with Ehlo Huang "Since Beginning" (從頭) with Jacky Chu and Ehlo Huang
Ying Ye 3 Jia 1 Soundtrack: Artist: Various Artists; Released: 2007	"To Believe Again" with Chen Qiao En "Looking for My Best Friend" with Jason Hsu
