= The Magicians of Love =

- Promo poster
- Also known as: Love Magician, 爱情魔发师
- 愛情魔髮師
- Genre: Romance, Comedy
- Created by: Sanlih E-Television
- Written by: Liu Dian Run
- Directed by: Liu Jun Jie; Chen Ming Zhang
- Starring: Ming Dao; Joanne Tseng; Sam Wang; Jacky Zhu; Ehlo Huang
- Opening theme: Perfect Lover 183 Club
- Ending theme: A Date So Sweet by 183 Club
- Country of origin: Republic of China (Taiwan)
- Original language: Mandarin
- No. of series: 1
- No. of episodes: 22

Production
- Producer: Chen Yu Shan
- Production location: Taiwan
- Running time: 90 minutes
- Production company: Sanlih E-Television 三立電視

Original release
- Network: TTV
- Release: 12 February – 9 July 2006

Related
- Green Forest, My Home 綠光森林; Smiling Pasta 微笑 Pasta

The Magicians of Love (Chinese: 愛情魔髮師; pinyin: Ai Qing Mo Fa Shi) is a 2006 Taiwanese drama produced by Sanlih, starring Ming Dao, Jacky Zhu, and Ehlo Huang from Taiwanese boyband 183 Club, and Joanne Tseng from the musical duo Sweety as the main leads. The series ran from February 12, 2006 to July 9, 2006 on Sanlih's TTV channel, with 22 episodes total.

== Synopsis ==
Three top hairstylists in town, Artz (Matt Lin, a.k.a. Ming Dao), Riche (Sam Wang), and Fernando (Jacky Chu), open the "Neo-Image Hair Salon" opposite the traditional barbershop run by Little Bei (Joanne Tseng) and her father. The new "Neo-Image Hair Salon" is also a big blow to Ming (Ehlo Huang), apprentice of Little Bei's father who always claims to be Little Bei's boyfriend. Worse still, Little Bei becomes attracted to the charismatic top hairstylists, especially Artz and Riche. What will be the future of Little Bei's shop and her love life?

== Summary ==
The world-famous hair salon franchise, Neo-Image has opened and its top three hairstylists - Ya Si (Ming Dao), Er Qi (Sam Wang Shao Wei), and Fei Nan Du's (Jacky Zhu Fan Gang) - fashioning handsome hairstyles attracting large crowds. At this time, a foreign affairs government official rushes over and asks them for help. It turns out that a shampoo company is conducting an event called the "Asian Hairstyle Competition" and they have hired a part-time female hairstylist to compete against the top-notch French hairstylist. Their objective is to help advertise the French hair products. Since this event will seriously belittle the country's image, Ya Si and his crew decide to help out.

Ya Si and his crew replace the part-time female hairstylist to help gain some glory for their country. When the dazzling model comes out with the beautiful hairstyle, Ya Si and his crew receive cheers from the whole crowd. The female hairstylist that they chased off the stage is none other than Nuo Ruo Yi (Xiao Bei), a worker from "Zhong Nan Barbershop," Neo-Image's neighbor over the next alley. Even though Ya Si has chased Xiao Bei off the stage, seeing her snip her first cut, he decided that she has quite the talent and secretly plots to win her over.

Neo-Image's grand opening is damaging to the family-run style Zhong Nan Barbershop. Zhong Nan's owner is called Lao Bei (Zhao Shun) who opened up this barbershop after retiring from the army. The brand new and fashionable hair salon at the front of the alley gruadually took away Zhong Nan's customers. Leo Bei's daughter, Xiao Bei, was also attracted to Neo-Image.

Chou Mei (Qiu Shu Fang) followed Ya Si through 18 towns and finally got the chance to have him change her hairstyle. On Neo-Image's opening night, Chou Mei went into the store's "Magic Room" and didn't come back out. Through the darkness of the window, Xiao Bei saw Fei Nan Du wielding his knife and blood splashing out; Neo-Image's back door, Xiao Bei saw Er Qi handing over a large canvas bag to two guys. Xiao Bei believes that Chou Mei must have met with an accident and hence, decided to report it to the police. Ya Si and the guys were brought to the police station and Xiao Bei called for a press conference at Zhong Nan to account for the "murder" that she witnessed. Not long after that, Chou Mei returns home and put an end to this whole ridiculous matter. Unfortunately, when the truth comes out, it was already too late to stop the submission of the newspaper article.

The next day, "Suspicious Murder Case" made the headline news and Fei Nan Du urgently called for a press conference in front of the store. In the middle of his explanation, the Chief of Defense Force arrived at Zhong Nan Barbershop. The reporters went crazy and starts asking about the army's military exercise practices. Ya Si and Xiao Bei bets on the headline news for the next day. Unfortunately, Ya Si lost to Xiao Bei and as a result, not only does he have to take wedding photos with Chou Mei but he also has to sleep overnight at the "haunted room" on Zhong Nan's top floor. A drunken Ya Si mistakes Xiao Bei to be Qing Kong and gives her a tender hug. Unfortunately, Zhe Ming (Ehlo Huang Yu Rong) unknowingly locks the door and Ya Si and Xiao Bie unexpectedly spends a night together...

Half a year ago, in a car accident in England, Ya Si lost both his mother and younger brother, but he didn't dare to tell this truth to his grandmother, Li Lian Nai Nai, who lives at Healthy Life Manor House. As a result, he pretends to be his younger twin brother, Ya Jun and goes to visit her. It just so happens that Xiao Bei is doing voluntary work by cutting hair there and Ya Si is forced to continue to go on with his "acting"...

Ya Si and Xiao Bei incidentally walked into the "Water Maze." Legend has it that if a couple can easily walk through the maze, then they are destined to be lovers for life. Years ago, Ya Si and Qing Kong did not manage to make it through the maze. On this day, Xiao Bei accidentally walked through it with one try and Ya Si was extremely shocked.

The wedding pictures that Ya Si and Chou Mei took were enlarged and placed outside the shop which made Ya Si vow for revenge. An opportunity arrives when Xiao Bei's assistant, Tong Tong, comes peeking into Neo-Image. Ya Si hopes that she would come to work and as a result, Ya Si and Xiao Bei makes a bet again. If Tong Tong comes to Neo-Image, then Xiao Bei must come to be a hair washer girl too. Tong Tong's betrayal caused Xiao Bei to lose the bet but when Xiao Bei thinks about leaving her father, her conscience would be troubled. Worried and not paying much attention caused Xiao Bei to get into a car accident. In her subconscious, she felt a guy saving her but she only remembers that the T-shirt that he was wearing had the number "23" on it...

On Xiao Bei's first day of work, there was a fight between famous model, Ke Lan and Emma over an advertising project. Top model, Ke Lan fell in love with Fei Nan Du at the height of her career but Fei Nan Du had fell in love with Emma and they were caught kissing by the media. Through Er Qi and Ya Si's efforts, Ke Lan finally won the right to be the advertisement's spokesperson.

Er Qi's god-father is one of Hong Kong's mafia bosses, Chen Ge. As a result of Er Qi's father losing Er Qi to Chen Ge over a bet, therefore, to Er Qi, Chen Ge is forever his master. Because Chen Ge's ninth wife, Bai He, likes Er Qi, it brought about Chen Ge's misunderstanding and forced Er Qi to escape from Hong Kong. Chen Ge, however, also sends people to "invite" Er Qi back to Hong Kong. Er Qi bumped into them a couple of times and Xiao Bei coincidentally happens to be by his side when it happens. As a result, Xiao Bei mistakes Er Qi to be "an undercover police officer." Er Qi doesn't deny it and his mysterious identity causes Xiao Bei to fall in love with him.

Qing Kong quietly comes back to the country but she didn't go see Ya Si as promised. On the contrary, she observes Ya Si from the side. Sure enough, she finds out that Ya Si treats Xiao Bei very well and couldn't help but feel a bit disappointed. Neo-Image is on the verge of carrying out its yearly evaluation for the assistants. The assistants can choose their friends as their model. Qing Kong hides her identity and deliberately gets close to Xiao Bei to become her good friend. Ya Si's younger twin brother, Ya Jun, has already died, but Ya Si continues to act as his brother to hide the fact from his grandmother. In order to make Nai Nai happy, Xiao Bei agrees to be Ya Jun's girlfriend for a day. It was on this day that Xiao Bei discovers many of Ya Si's good qualities and started having feelings for Ya Si.

The day of the yearly evaluation finally arrives. Mango, the one everyone acknowledges to be the most likely to be promoted to hairstylist, chooses to have Zhe Ming, who has had a huge fight with Xiao Bei, to be her model. Xiao Bei remains calm and was just about to leash out when Qing Kong comes to Neo-Image at that moment. When Xiao Bei finds out that Qing Kong is Ya Si's previous girlfriend, she was emotionally hurt and lost all her inspirations. As a result, she failed the evaluation. At this moment, Er Qi also realizes that the feelings that Xiao Bei have for Ya Si are out of the ordinary.

Qing Kong's appearance caused Xiao Bei to have competitions in both her career and love. Her and Ya Si's love for the future are filled with uncertainty. Neo-Image's England Marketing manager, Anna, was Ya Si's father's mistress. After Anna returns to the country, she was enticed by Fei Nan Du. On the front of operating Neo-Image, she and Ya Si were both fighting over the trend of the business and the art of hair-styling. Can Ya Si and Er Qi prove that if one persists on chasing one's dream then one day, it will come true? Stuck between Ya Si and Er Qi, who will be the one she ends up with in the end?

== Cast ==
=== Main cast ===
- Ming Dao as Du Ya Si (Artz)

A famous hair salon franchise, Neo-Image’s top hairstylist. A car accident caused the deaths of his mother and his younger twin brother, Ya Jun. In order to keep this terrible truth from his grandmother, Li Lian Nai Nai, Ya Si goes to visit her pretending to be his younger brother to keep her mind at ease. His job requests him to be strict and cool, appearing cold and straightforward so that no one can get close to him. Women who are lacking is looks never leave a lasting impression on him. In Ya Si’s heart, there will always be only one queen – Qing Kong, the girlfriend that he is waiting for to return to him. Qing Kong is pretty and straightforward. Her attitude towards work and her fighting spirit does not lose to that of Ya Si. Yet Ya Si accepts the emotional torment that Qing Kong directs toward him and continues to uphold her promise ~ waiting for her to return! Ya Si, who longs for Qing Kong, would go to the place where they declared their love for each other daily, the Water Maze. Legend has it that the person who stands at the exit of the Water Maze must be your true love in order for you to find the exit to the palace’s maze. One bright sunny afternoon, Xiao Bei was after Ya Si for revenge and accidentally went through the maze and found Ya Si standing at the doorway of the exit. This is how Xiao Bei walked into Ya Si’s life.

- Joanne Tseng as Bei Ruo Yi (Xiao Bei)

Everyone calls her father “Lao Bei”, as a result, her nickname becomes “Xiao Bei.” Her mother left home after giving birth to her and only left behind a black and white photo. Even though her father implements a “military style of teaching,” yet she is not afraid one bit. At “Zhong Nan Barbershop,” Xiao Bei follows her father’s hair cutting techniques and the achievements that she accomplishes make Lao Bei proud. “A thousand soldiers with crew cuts” gave Xiao Bei the nickname of “Army Lover.” There has always been a contradiction in Xiao Bei’s heart and that is the conflict between the old style of hair cutting and fashionable style of hair cutting. She is very interested with fashionable hair cutting but because she doesn’t want her father to be upset, she suppresses her interest. With the appearance of Neo-Image, Xiao Bei is always deliberately criticizing them in front of her father. However, the more she suppresses her interest, the more uncomfortable she feels within her heart as Xiao Bei must think about the crisis for Zhong Nan Barbershop and her goal for the future. One day, she bumps into her good friend, Tong Tong, getting a haircut design at the salon, Neo-Image. In her anger, she uses their friendship to tell Tong Tong not to cut her hair. Standing aside, Ya Si couldn’t believe such a ridiculous request and makes a bet with Xiao Bei. If Tong Tong gets a successful make-over at Neo-Image, then Ya Si will make Xiao Bei a hair washer there. Unfortunately, Xiao Bei loses and enters into Neo-Image to start a new turning point in her life…

- Sam Wang as Lin Er Qi (Richie)

Neo-Image’s top hairstylist. Hong Kong Designer Institute’s lecturer. When Er Qi was nine years old, his father and Hong Kong’s mafia boss, Chen Ge gambled and Er Qi was lost to Chen Ge. From then on, Er Qi has a mafia background. Years later, he finally managed to get away from Chen Ge and went to Taiwan. However, Chen Ge continues to use any methods to get Er Qi back. Based on his looks, all the girls tried to guess what his identity is. The conclusion they came up with was that he is an “undercover police officer” and Er Qi has never denied it. Even though that is the case, his skills still receive everyone’s recognition. With a tragic childhood, Er Qi’s warm and considerate side was brought forward by his meeting with the kind and innocent Xiao Bei. Er Qi’s philosophy of “living only for today” also starts to change. He has to live and spend his days with Xiao Bei. Er Qi has an eight-year-old son, Xuan Feng. He wasn’t even aware that he had a son out of wedlock until his first love from his teenage years sent Xuan Feng to him because she was getting married. This shocking news threw Er Qi off guard. It was only when Xiao Bei accidentally finds out that Xuan Feng was staying in Zhong Nan that this secret was revealed to everyone. As a result, in front of everyone, they address each other as “brothers” only.

- Jacky Zhu as Fei Nan Du (Fernando)

One of the top hairstylists in famous hair salon, Neo-Image. With his playful nature, he treats relationships and feelings lightly. In Fernando’s eyes, each woman in his life has her own enchanting characteristic and his love is selfish and heartless, not willing to be faithful. At Neo-Image, Fernando and Ya Si often have disputes because they both have their differences on how the salon should be managed. Fernando emphasizes on public relations and believes that putting money on advertising is a must. He insists that the hair washer girls be nice looking too. However, Ya Si’s thinking is different and believes that there is no point is wasting money. As long as the hairstyles and techniques are up to standard, then it’s just natural that the customer’s interest could be captured. In Neo-Image, they are the two with the most differences in opinions.

- Ehlo Huang as Xiao Zhe Ming

Childhood friends with Xiao Bei and in front of others, addresses Xiao Bei as his “girlfriend.” He labels himself as “Zhong Nan” Lao Bei’s apprentice too. When he was young, he was a rebellious kid. He aspired to be the village’s gangster and pretended to be courageous and fought to be vicious. After Lao Bei gave him a fierce lesson, he started to regard Lao Bei as his idol and takes on the responsibility of protecting Xiao Bei. Even though he has turned good from his bad past, yet he couldn't change his hoodlum personality. He tried his best to pursue Xiao Bei and even goes as far as to declare to everyone that Xiao Bei is his future wife. However, this trick has no relevance to Xiao Bei at all. When he finds out that Xiao Bei is being pulled between Ya Si and Er Qi, Zhe Ming becomes desolate and dejected. He knows that he is not as professional as Ya Si and not as fierce as Er Qi. As a result, he swears to change for the better. The enchantment of the Magic Room not only changes the appearance of someone but the important point is the transformation of that person’s attitude. The newly transformed Zhe Ming changed his playful and trouble-making personality. He sets up a whole new goal in life and in the end, gets the approval from the top three hairstylists at Neo-Image and becomes the fourth top-notch hairstylist.

=== Supporting cast ===
- Sonia Sui as Ye Ke Lan

A former famous model. When she just started out, her appearance was eye-catching and her talents were outstanding. In a very short period of time, she became very famous with many invitations to appear in TV dramas and movies. At the height of her career, she meets Fernando. Without any second thoughts, she decided to withdraw from the entertainment circle. Unfortunately, Fernando did not change himself because of Ke Lan and continued on with his playboy ways. Living in a beautiful castle, Ke Lan becomes imprisoned in her own home. Yet, after she meets Er Qi, she mistakes that Er Qi lives a wandering and carefree life and that this is the kind of life that she should look forward to. Er Qi’s appearance accidentally fills up the blank void in Ke Lan’s emotional life and allowed her once lonely heart to give up everything for him. She truthfully expresses her feelings to Er Qi and goes after the freedom that she yearns for in her heart. When Ke Lan finds out that the one Er Qi likes is Xiao Bei, she receives another emotional blow to her heart. Yet, in the end, she still bravely chooses and follows the true self within her heart.

- Annie Sun Ai Hui as Emma

A fashion model. She has recently become the favorite among the media and has been acknowledged by the public as the successor of famous model, Ye Ke Lan. In order to become the focus point of the media, she doesn't hesitate to expose her relationship with Fernando, fully exposing her competitive and forceful personality.

- Adriene Lin Meng Jin as Qing Kong

An elegant and graceful face with a pair of large, clear eyes and a sweet smile that captivate many men. She is Ya Si’s girlfriend and is forever the queen in Ya Si’s heart. Earnest and stubborn with good taste, Ya Si knows that he is unable to resist being infatuated with Qing Kong. He is willing to accept her indecisive personality and wait patiently for her to come back. Possessing the looks of Venus, she has been pursuing the height of her career all her life and is never going to be able to stop. She believed with all her heart that Ya Si will be her partner in this lifetime, yet she doesn't know when to slow down. When she finally stops and looks back, she has already lost something…

- Jade Qu Min Jie as Guan Tong Tong

Hair washer at Neo-Image. Her interest is to make herself pretty so that she can meet more boys. Because she loves to be pretty, she has longed to become a professional hairstylist since she was young. As a result, she leaves her native town to go North to study hairdressing and becomes Xiao Bei’s classmate. With a friendly personality, Tong Tong lives at Zhong Nan Barbershop after she graduates and lets Xiao Bei treat her as an apprentice without any complaints. Tong Tong gets fascinated by Ya Si’s professional skills and goes to Neo-Image for a haircut without telling Xiao Bei. She caused Xiao Bei to lose the bet and becomes the hair washer girl at Neo-Image. In the end, even Tong Tong gets into Neo-Image. Tong Tong is Xiao Bei’s most loyal friend.

- Zhao Shun as Lao Bei

Nicknamed “Lao Bei.” Is Xiao Bei’s father. Has great hairdressing skills. He has always been the hairstylist at the army. From the generals down to the soldiers, there is not one person who is not faithful to his skills. Due to his long term life style at the army, he has always been single. Till the day when he retires, he meets his wife, Yin Feng, who is 20 years younger than him. They got married and he opens up a barbershop call “Zhong Nan.” However, not long after the birth of Xiao Bei, his wife left home and there has been no news from her again. With a straightforward and conservative personality, despite the fact that he would often lose his temper with his daughter, when faced with her slow replies, he would always feel helpless. When faced with his “ordinary” daughter, he doesn't have any high expectations for her either. He only hopes that she will have a peaceful and smooth life. When he sees his wife, Yin Feng, come back with a new transformation and became Annabelle, he understands that his wife no longer have any feelings for him. He agrees to a divorce and that they will not see each other again. However, when Xiao Bei fell ill, he gave up on all his dignity and hope that Annabelle could use her status as Xiao Bei’s mother and save Xiao Bei.

- Lu Man Yin as Xiang Xiang Yi

Lao Bei’s long time neighbor and landlady. Zhe Ming’s widowed mother. She is very open-minded given her old age. She is the type that would take the initiative to create a romantic date for her son and daughter-in-law. Someone whose romantic side is forever at the age of 20. After Lao Bei’s wife left home and being stuck helplessly with an infant Xiao Bei, Xiang Xiang Yi kindheartedly extended a helping hand. She dotes on Xiao Bei very much. Xiang Xiang Yi has a crush on Lao Bei but her feelings were never reciprocated. She also hopes that Zhe Ming and Xiao Bei can become a couple so that their relationship could become even “closer.”

- Tan Ai-chen as Li Lian Nai Nai

Ya Si’s grandmother. She lives in a nursing home called “Healthy Life Manor House” and is Ya Si’s only relative. She likes Andy Lau and should be his oldest fan. She favors Ya Si’s younger twin brother, Ya Jun and holds resentment towards Ya Si. Li Lian Nai Nai is the relative that Ya Si desires to get close to the most. Under Xiao Bei’s facilitation, she finds out the secret that Ya Si has been pretending to be Ya Jun to get her good favors. Li Lian was greatly touched and starts to love Ya Si.

- Lin Ke Wei as Mango

Fernando’s assistant. Xiao Bei’s main competitor after entering into Neo-Image. She is deeply devoted to hair-styling. Originally, her personality is innocent and timid. However, after getting recognition for her skills, she starts being arrogant. In order to continue climbing upward, she doesn't hesitate to become a spy among her colleagues and instigate problems for everyone. With her family being poor and being pressured by financial matters, she is determined to make a name for herself at Neo-Image. As a result, any barriers that appear in front of her must be removed!

- Pan Yi Ru as Chanel

Neo-Image’s accountant. An old maid, who still hasn't had a boyfriend even until she is 40 years old. Because of imbalance in her hormones, she vents over anything. Not only does she have a serious disorder for being neat, she also has an extreme personality – she is way over her head with being just and fair! Yet she is an accountant that one can trust. She is the first good manager at Neo-Image. A partner whom Ya Si and the rest highly trusts. She manages the store with much devotion and can’t stand those hairstylists that lie to their customers. In the end, Er Qi couldn't stand her aggressive attitude anymore and pulled her into the magic room and gave her a transformation causing her life to be filled with suitors!

- Cheng Bo Ren as Moli

Neo-Image’s customer relations manager. He is good at welcoming people and sucking up to people. He likes to wear white suits, has a disorder for cleanliness and loves to gossip. He and Chanel knows every little gossip about each of the handsome hairstylists’ relationships. People would not be satisfied if he doesn't draw a conclusion to all the gossips within the store.

- Qiu Shu Fang as Chou Mei

An abandoned baby that Xiang Xiang Yi found. Xiang Xiang Yi treats Chou Mei like her own daughter but Chou Mei sadly thinks herself as the girl in the drama “Child Bride.” She, Xiao Bei, Zhe Ming and Tong Tong are playmates that grew up together. Her nickname is “Chou Mei” or ugly younger sister. She is Ya Si’s shadow. Throughout the 18 towns that Ya Si goes on travel, you would be able to see Chou Mei’s shadow. Yet Ya Si, who only looks at beautiful things, has never paid attention to Chou Mei’s existence.

== Soundtrack ==
The Magicians of Love Original Soundtrack

Soundtrack album by Jungiery artistes
- Released: 17 February 2006
- Genre: Mandopop
- Language: Mandarin
- Label: Warner Music Taiwan

The Magicians of Love Original Soundtrack (CD) (愛情魔髮師 電視原聲帶) was released on February 17, 2006 by Jungiery artistes under Warner Music Taiwan. It contains 13 songs, in which 6 songs are various instrumental versions of the songs. The opening theme is track 1 "Perfect Lover 完美情人" by 183 Club, while the closing theme is track 13 "A Date So Sweet 甜蜜約定" by 183 Club.

=== Track listing ===
No.	Title	Singer(s)	Length
1.	"Perfect Lover" (完美情人)	183 Club	4:33
2.	"Magic Room"	183 Club	3:17
3.	"Mis-take" (誤打誤撞)	Instrumental	2:47
4.	"Bomba Bomba"	183 Club	3:05
5.	"Can't Fight the Fate" (不可抗拒的命運)	Instrumental	1:58
6.	"Shattered Dream" (幻滅)	Instrumental	3:03
7.	"Affective Line" (感情線)	Instrumental	4:23
8.	"Nobody Knows That Secret" (沒人知道的秘密)	Instrumental	3:38
9.	"2 Sweet"	Ehlo Huang & Joe Chen	2:04
10.	"Maze" (迷宮)	7 Flowers	4:02
11.	"Gorgeous Revenge" (華麗的復仇)	Instrumental	3:15
12.	"NEO Illusion" (霓虹幻影)	Instrumental	3:16
13.	"A Date So Sweet" (甜蜜約定)	183 Club	4:03

The Magicians of Love Original Soundtrack HK ver.

Soundtrack album by Jungiery artistes
- Released: 18 July 2006
- Genre: Mandopop
- Language: Mandarin
- Label: Warner Music Hong Kong

A second version of the soundtrack was released for Hong Kong on July 18, 2006 under Warner Music Hong Kong. The CD features all 13 songs on the Taiwan version with a bonus VCD featuring 4 MV's and makings of the MV's.

=== Bonus VCD ===
No.	Title	Length
1.	"A Date So Sweet" (Makings of MV)
2.	"A Date So Sweet" (MV)
3.	"Perfect Lover" (Makings of MV)
4.	"Perfect Lover" (MV)
5.	"Magic Room" (Makings of MV)
6.	"Magic Room" (MV)
7.	"Bomba Bomba" (Makings of MV)
8.	"Bomba Bomba" (MV)

== Remake ==
It remade by Indonesia as Penyihir Cinta

== Episode ratings ==
Episode	Air Date	Average Ratings	Ranking
1	February 12, 2006	3.60	1
2	February 19, 2006	4.50	1
3	February 26, 2006	4.05	1
4	March 5, 2006	4.20	1
5	March 12, 2006	4.15	1
6	March 19, 2006	4.28	1
7	March 26, 2006	4.48	1
8	April 2, 2006	4.55	1
9	April 9, 2006	4.84	1
10	April 16, 2006	4.66	1
11	April 23, 2006	4.89	1
12	April 30, 2006	5.05	1
13	March 7, 2006	5.20	1
14	March 14, 2006	4.27	1
15	March 21, 2006	5.02	1
16	March 28, 2006	5.15	1
17	June 4, 2006	4.29	1
18	June 11, 2006	4.96	1
19	June 18, 2006	4.63	1
20	June 25, 2006		1
21	July 2, 2006	4.73	1
22	July 9, 2006	5.44	1
Average ratings		4.62	
