= 183 Club =

Taiwanese boy band

- Origin: Taiwan
- Genre: Pop music
- Years active: 2004–2008
- Label: Warner Music
- Past members: Ehlo Huang; Ming Dao; Sam Wang; Jacky Chu; Yen Hsing-su
- Website: Official website

183Club,, was a Taiwanese boyband that was managed by Jungiery and was part of J-Star. Originally, the group was called "183 Yu Le Bu," meaning "183 Entertainment Group," but it was later decided that the name should be shortened to 183Club.

They have acted in various Taiwanese dramas such as Magicians of Love, The Prince Who Turns into a Frog and Le Robe de Mariage des Cieux.

The group's Magicians of Love Original Soundtrack won Best Original Soundtrack at the 2007 HITO Radio Music Awards, presented by Taiwanese radio station Hit FM.

== Members ==
=== Current ===
Stage name		Birth name		Date of birth
English	Chinese	Romanized	Chinese	Date of birth
Ming Dao	明道	Lin Chao Chang	明道	February 26, 1980 (age 46)
Sam Wang	王少偉	Wang Shao Wei	王少偉	December 18, 1976 (age 49)
Ehlo Huang	黃玉榮	Huang Yu Jung	黃玉榮	April 1, 1977 (age 49)

=== Former ===
Stage name		Birth name		Date of birth
English	Chinese	Romanized	Chinese	Date of birth
Jacky Chang	張又天	Chu Fan Kang	祝釩剛	August 22, 1979 (age 47)
Johnny Yen	顏行書	Yen Hsing Shu	顏行書	September 8, 1976 (age 50)

== Filmography ==
- My MVP Valentine (2002)
- Westside Story (2003)
- Top on Forbidden City (2004)
- In Love With A Rich Girl (2004)
- Le Robe De Mariage Des Cieux (Heaven's Wedding Gown) (2004)
- The Prince Who Turns into a Frog (2005)
- The Magicians of Love (2006)
- Legend of Star Apple (2006)
- Angel Lover (2006)
- Rocks Paper Scissors (2006)
- Ying Ye 3 Jia 1 (2007)
- Mean Girl A Chu (2007)
- Your Home is My Home (2007)

== Discography ==
- La Robe De Mariage Des Cieux (Heaven's Wedding Gown) OST (2004)
- The Prince Who Turns into a Frog OST (2005)
- The Magicians of Love OST (2006)
- The First Album (2006)
- Angel Lover OST (2007)
- Love Miracle 1
- Love Miracle 2
- Love Miracle 3

== YouTube career ==
In late 2005, a YouTube channel was made under the name 183Club, which started posting clips or full music videos about the boyband, reaching a total of over 230 videos before the channel's termination. The channel rose in popularity to just over a thousand subscribers and ranked #16 by June 12. The channel was terminated within the next two weeks.
