= Knock Knock Loving You =

2009 romance Taiwanese drama

- Promo poster
- Also known as: 敲敲愛上你
- 敲敲愛上你
- Genre: Romance
- Directed by: Ke Han Chen 柯翰辰
- Starring: Dylan Kuo 郭品超; Ming Dao 明道; Maggie Wu 吳亞馨
- Opening theme: You Fly 你飛吧 by Chang Yun Jing 張芸京
- Ending theme: Black Dress 黑裙子 by Chang Yun Jing 張芸京
- Country of origin: Republic of China (Taiwan)
- Original language: Mandarin
- No. of series: 1
- No. of episodes: 13

Production
- Executive producers: Ke Yi-qín 柯以勤; Su Gui-ying 蘇桂瑩
- Production locations: Taiwan, Shanghai China
- Running time: 90 minutes
- Production company: Duo Man Ni Ltd. 多曼尼 Ltd

Original release
- Network: CTS; GTV
- Release: 12 April – 5 July 2009

Related
- Prince + Princess 2 王子看見二公主; ROSEATE-LOVE 紫玫瑰

Knock Knock Loving You (Traditional Chinese: 敲敲愛上你, Pinyin: Qiao Qiao Ai Shang Ni), also known as Quietly Falling in Love with You, is a 2009 romance Taiwanese drama starring Dylan Kuo, Maggie Wu, and Ming Dao. The drama is based on a 2005 Taiwanese romance novel Treasure In The Side (珠玉在側) by Taiwan author Xi Juan 席絹. Filming began on December 23, 2007 on location in Taiwan and Shanghai, China. Filming finished on March 23, 2008. The drama began airing on CTS and GTV on April 12, 2009 on Sunday at 22:00 p.m. It finish airing on July 5, 2009 with 13 episodes total.

== Synopsis ==
Cheng Zhi Ang a mousy looking girl that has admired Cheng Xue Ge, who is a talented violinist, since their university days. But her chance to know him is stolen by another due to her act of kindness. This action causes her to realize the deceits of human nature and not to easily trust others so easily. Cheng Xue Ge is a talented violinist who has lived comfortably all his life, and because of his father's wealth he is able to do what he wants which is to play the violin. That carefree life comes to an end when his father's business goes bankrupt. He soon gives up on being a violinist to take over his father's failing business and encounters the backstabbing and ruthlessness of the business world. To learn how to survive in the business world he asks Zhi Ang for help in teaching him how to be ruthless, but later finds out her cold demeanor is a wall she had built to protect herself. But she is persuaded by Zhao Guan Xi who wants her for her business talent before he can realize if he loves her.

== Cast ==
=== Wei Lin Resort ===
- Dylan Kuo 郭品超 as Cheng Xue Ge 程雪歌
- Liu Shang Qian 劉尚謙 as Cheng Zhi Ang 程志昂

=== Yao Shi Corporation ===
- Maggie Wu 吳亞馨 as Yao Zi Wang 姚子望
- Chang Chen-kuang 張晨光 as Yao Wan Chuan 姚萬傳
- Feng Yuan Zhen 馮媛甄 as Yao Zi Qi 姚子期
- Ah Mei 阿美 翼勢力 as Yao Hui En 姚匯恩
- Wu Wen Xuan 吳玟萱 as Hui En's mother
- Ying Cai Ling 應采靈 as Zi Wang's mother
- Emma Ni 倪雅倫 as Yao Zi Dai 姚子待
- Huang Qi Wei 黃琦葳 as Yao Zi Lai 姚子萊

=== Huang Xin Financial ===
- Ming Dao 明道 as Zhao Guan Xi 趙冠希
- Coco Jiang 蔣怡 as Zhao Guan Li 趙冠麗

=== Others ===
- Li Xiaolu 李小璐 as Tang Qing Wu 唐清舞
- Bai Xu Xu 柏栩栩 as Shen Qian 沈謙
- Amanda Zhou 周曉涵 as Xiao Bu 小步
- Pang Yong Zhi 龐庸之 as A Zhe 阿哲
- Xiu Qin 琇琴 as A Zhe's wife 哲妻
- Larisa Bakurova 瑞莎 as Guan Xi's girlfriend 冠希女友
- Zhou Zi Jun 周子俊 as Zi Dai's husband 子期夫
- Guo Shi Lun 郭人豪 as gangster Zheng
- Gao Zhen Peng 高振鵬 as Assistant Gao
- Cai Wang 蔡網 as Tang's father
- Bei Yuan Shan Mao 北原山貓 as aborigine Taiwanese volunteer

== Production credits ==
- Original novel: Zhu Yu Zai Ce (珠玉在側) by Xi Juan 席絹
- Director: Ke Han Chen 柯翰辰
- Producer:
  - Ke Yi-qín 柯以勤
  - Su Gui-ying 蘇桂瑩
- Production company: Duo Man Ni Ltd. 多曼尼 Ltd

== Broadcast ==
Channel	Country/Location	Airing Date	Timeslot	Notes
CTS	Taiwan	April 12, 2009	Sundays 22:00	June 14 onward 22:10
GTV	Taiwan	April 17, 2009	Fridays 20:00	May 8 onward 21:00
MATV TV	Singapore	June 12, 2009	Monday to Friday 20:30	

== Episode ratings ==
Air Date	Episode	Average Ratings
April 12, 2009	1	0.66
April 19, 2009	2	0.59
April 26, 2009	3	0.68
May 3, 2009	4	0.56
May 10, 2009	5	0.43
May 17, 2009	6	0.42
May 24, 2009	7	0.60
May 31, 2009	8	0.64
June 7, 2009	9	0.55
June 14, 2009	10	0.42
June 21, 2009	11	0.61
June 28, 2009	12	0.61
July 5, 2009	13	0.58
Average ratings		0.57
