= Tony Sun =

Taiwanese actor

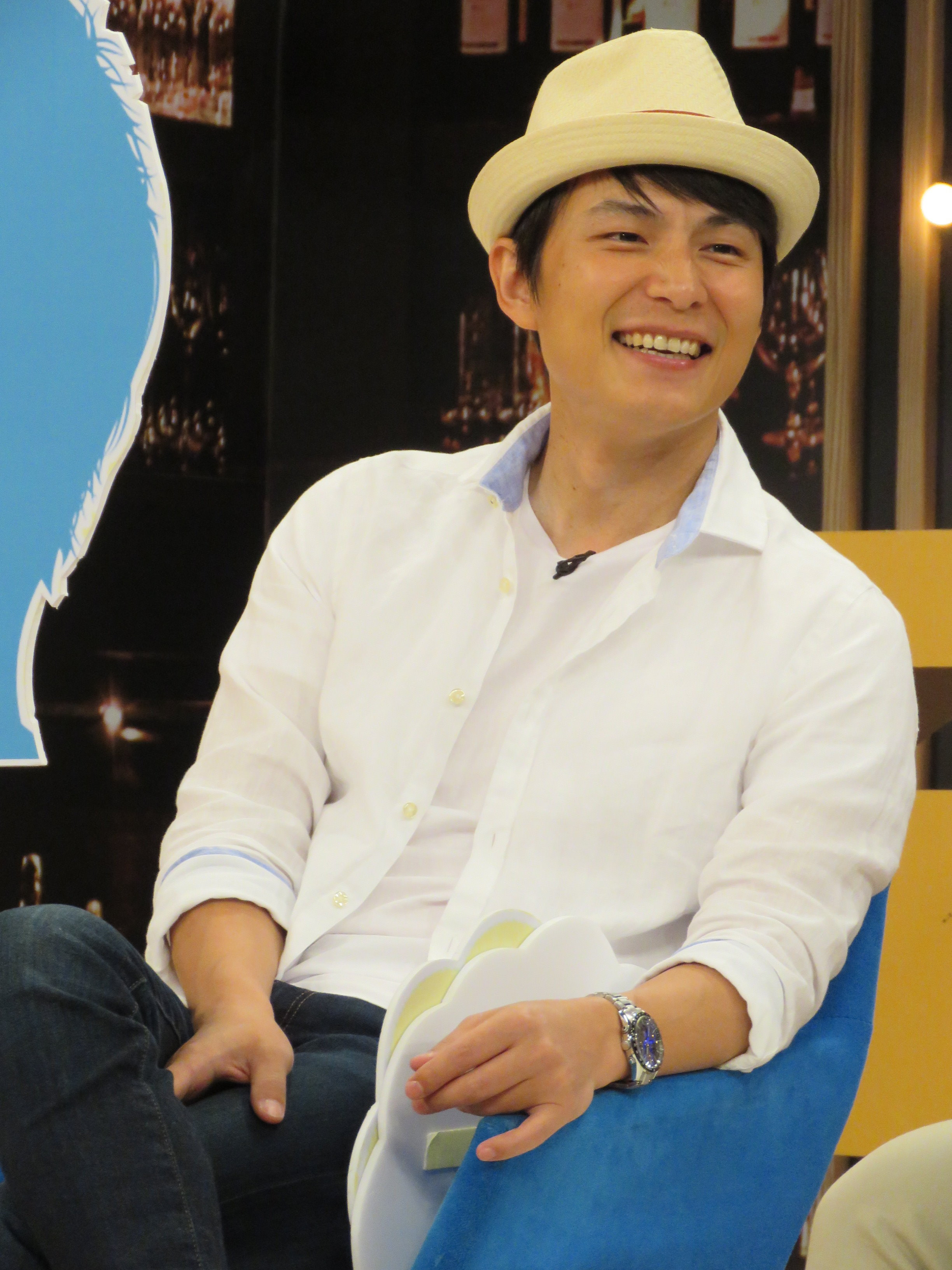
- Sun in 2019
- Born: 20 February 1978 (age 48); Kaohsiung, Taiwan
- Occupations: Singer, actor
- Years active: 1984–present
- Spouses: Angel Han (m. 2011; div. 2015); Ariel Sha (m. 2025)
- Musical career
- Genres: Mandopop, Taiwanese pop
- Formerly of: 5566

Tony Sun (Chinese: 孫協志; pinyin: Sūn Xié Zhì; born 20 February 1978) is a Taiwanese actor, singer, and host. He is the leader of Taiwanese group 5566.

== Career ==
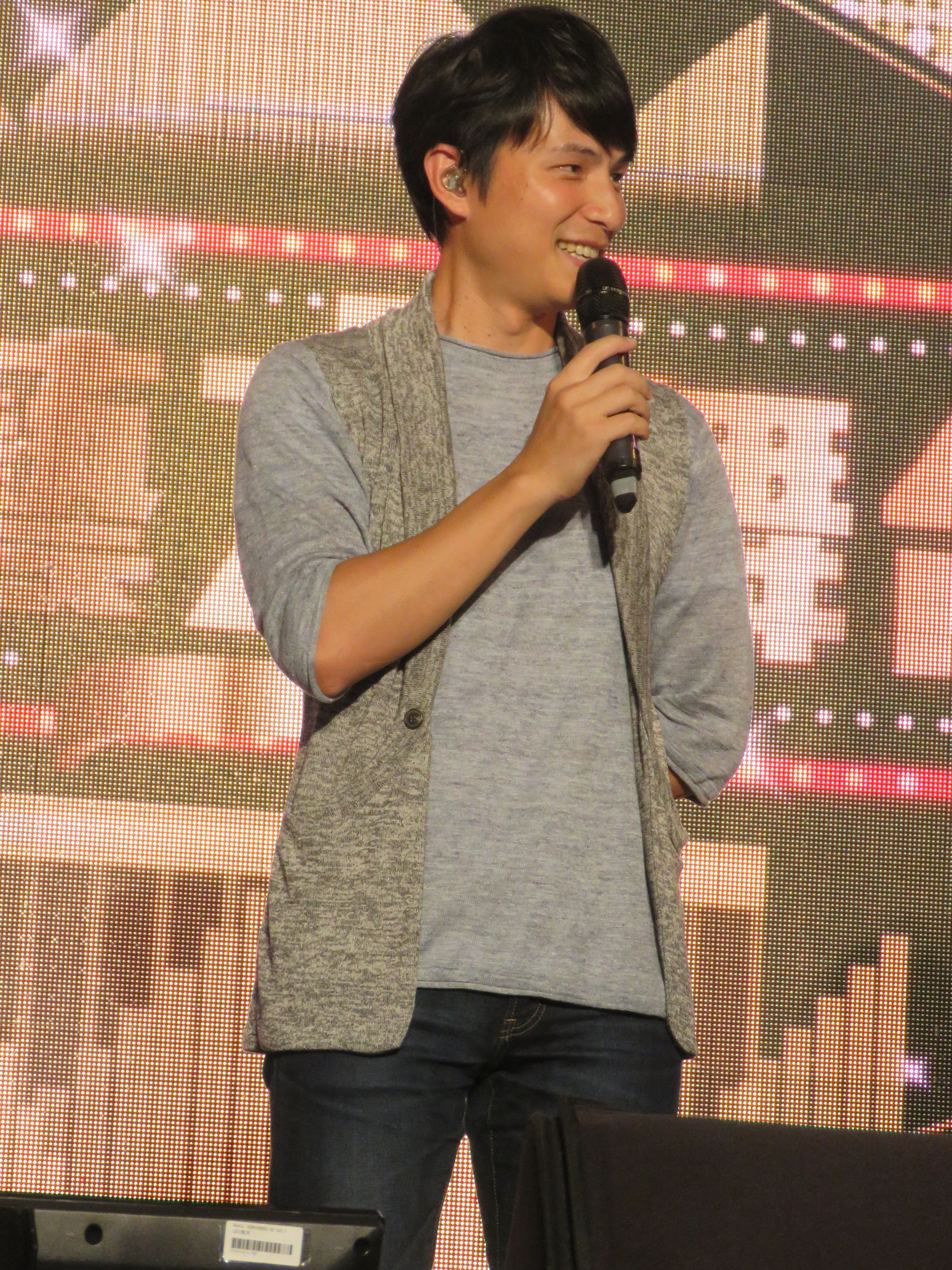
Sun in 2018

Sun gained much solo experience by releasing several well-received albums in Taiwanese Hokkien in the 1990s. However, his popularity waned when he had to fulfill his mandatory military service. Sun was signed under Jungiery since his earlier career days.

== Personal life ==
On 21 November 2011, Sun married actress Angel Han. In October 2015, the couple announced their divorce; they had no children.

When Sun was hosting a variety show The Hunger Games, singer Ariel Sha would appear frequently as a guest. They started dating since 2019, and then married on 3 March 2025.

== Filmography ==
Year	Title	Role
2008	魔女18 號 / Mo Nu 18 Hao	Guest appearance: 江口一郎
2008	真情滿天下 / Love In The Vineyard	Guan Ming Jie / 関明傑
2007	愛情，兩好三壞 / Love is Full Count	Meng Xue / 孟學
2006	魔劍生死棋 / The Sword And The Chess of Death	Ren Qian Xing / 任千行)
2006	食神 / God Of Cookery	(Guest appearance: as Jiu / 九)
2005	大熊醫師家 / Home Of Dr. Big Bear	(Guest appearance: as Qiao Xiao Zhi / 喬小志)
2005	格鬥天王 / Mr Fighting	Duan Yu Qiao / 段宇橋
2004	愛上千金美眉 / In Love With A Rich Girl	(Guest appearance)
2004	紫禁之巅 / Top on the Forbidden City	(Guest appearance)
2003	西街少年 / Westside Story	You Ya Yu / 游亞魚
2002	麻辣鮮師 / Taiwanese GTO	(Guest appearance)
2002	MVP情人 / My MVP Valentine	Liu Hua / 劉樺 / Tai Zi / 太子 (Prince)
2001	隔壁親家 / Parents of the married couple next door	
1993	鳥來伯與十三姨 /	

== Discography ==
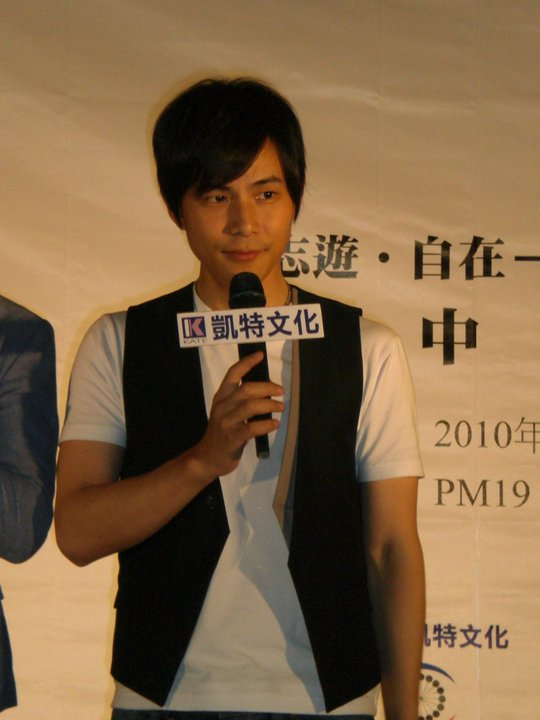
Sun in 2010

=== Solo albums ===
- Phoenix
- Language: Mandarin
- Release date: May 31, 2013

Track list:

1. 不死鸟
2. 要了我的命
3. 紧握幸福
4. 学习爱情夜
5. 恋爱关键
6. 看不见
7. 多久
8. 有你在身边
9. 不死鸟 (instrumental)
10. 要了我的命 (instrumental)

== Awards and nominations ==
Year	Award	Category	Nominated work	Result
2018	53rd Golden Bell Awards	Best Host for a Reality or Game Show	The Hunger Games	Nominated
