= Jason Hsu =

Taiwanese singer, actor and ice hockey player

- Born: 27 July 1985 (age 40); Taiwan
- Occupations: Singer, model, actor, host, ice hockey player
- Years active: 2000–present
- Spouse: Bernice Chao (m. 2019)

Chinese name
- Traditional Chinese: 許孟哲
- Simplified Chinese: 许孟哲
Transcriptions
Standard Mandarin
- Hanyu Pinyin: Xǔ Mèngzhe
Southern Min
- Hokkien POJ: Khó͘ Bēng-tiat
- Musical career
- Genres: Mandopop
- Labels: Warner Music; Jungiery Star
- Formerly of: 5566

Jason Hsu (Chinese: 許孟哲; Pe̍h-ōe-jī: Khó͘ Bēng-tiat, born 27 July 1985) is a Taiwanese singer, actor and ice hockey player. He was a member of the Taiwanese boyband 5566.

== Life and career ==
Hsu's father is a businessman. He has an elder sister.

Hsu is a keen ice hockey player, and has played for the Chinese Taipei national team since 2017.

== Discography ==
Original title	English title	Notes
MVP 情人 電視原聲帶	My MVP Valentine	
一光年	1st Album	First album – 2002
西街少年 電視原聲帶	Westside Story	
摯愛	Boyfriend	Second album – 2004
紫禁之巔 電視原聲帶	Top of the Forbidden City OST	
最棒冠軍精選	C'est Si Bon	Featured
格鬥天王 電視原聲帶	Mr. Fighting OST	
《愛的奇蹟 喬傑立巨星最紅偶像劇情歌精選》	Love Miracle I – Compilation Of J-star's Best OST Songs	Featured
好久不見	Long Time No See	Third studio album – 2005
《愛的奇蹟II 跳舞吧!	Love Miracle II – Come On Party!	
《愛的奇蹟III 搖滾萬歲》	Love Miracle III – I Love Rock And Roll	
《我愛56 – 傳說再現5年極精選》	I Love 56 – Retelling The First 5 Years	
櫻野三加一 電視原聲帶	Ying Ye 3+1 OST	
喝采	Bravo	Fourth studio album – 2008

== Filmography ==
Year	Original title	English title	Role	Network
2002	麻辣鮮師	Spicy Teacher	Li Meng Zhe (李孟哲)	CTS
2002	MVP 情人	My MVP Valentine	D.J.	SET TV
2003	西街少年	Westside Story	Feng Ye San	SET TV
2004	千金百分百	100% Senorita	Meng Zhe Lin	CTS & SET TV
2004	愛上千金美眉	In Love with a Rich Girl	Yi Wei Zhe	TTV
2005		Big Bear Doctor	Qiao Xiao Zhe	
2006	Captain Barbell		Cyborg 5566	GMA Network
2006	住左邊住右邊	Taipei Family	Himself/Guest	PTS & SET TV
2007	食神	Shi Shen	JASO	CTS
2007	櫻野3加1	Ying Ye 3 Jia 1	Wang Dao Ren/Bulu	TTV & SET TV
2010	家有四千金	Jia You Si Qian Jin	Pang Da Jing (龐大鯨)	TTV
2011	幸福裡的愛情	33 Gu Shi Guan: Xing Fu Li De Ai Qing	Pei Sheng	STV
2017	我和我的四個男人	Jojo's World	Li Bi He (李必合)	
2020	浪漫輸給你	Lost Romance	He Tian Jian/ Situ Moran	TTV & SETTV

== Awards and nominations ==
Year	Award	Category	Nominated work	Result
2018	53rd Golden Bell Awards	Best Host for a Reality or Game Show	The Hunger Games	Nominated
