= Jacky Chu =

Taiwanese actor and singer

Jacky Zhu
- Born: Zhu Fan Gang (祝釩剛); 22 August 1979 (age 47); Kaoshiung, Taiwan
- Occupations: Actor, singer
- Years active: 1998–2007
- Musical career
- Genres: Mandarin Pop
- Label: Jungiery
- Formerly of: 183 Club

Jacky Chu (simplified Chinese: 祝钒刚; traditional Chinese: 祝釩剛; pinyin: Zhù Fán Gāng) is a Taiwanese actor and is a former member of Taiwanese group 183 Club.

== Music career ==
Jacky entered New Talent Singing Awards Vancouver Audition 1998 and won. He then represented Vancouver in the International Finals and ended first runner-up. After finishing school he then moved to Taiwan to continue his singing career and was signed by Universal Music Taiwan. He released a solo album called "Telling" (告解) in 2003; however, the album did not sell well and Jacky was dropped from the label. In 2005, he was signed by Warner Music Taiwan and was attached to the male singing quintet, 183 Club.

== Dismissal from 183 Club ==
On 9 June 2007, it was reported that Jacky has been dropped from 183 Club and its management company due to Jacky's image being battered by his heavy late night partying and crazy love life. 183 Club group manager De-Rung Sun (孫德榮) confirms the dismissal saying, "183 Club is a group; it does not belong to a single person. I know there has not been previous cases [of dropping members from musical groups] before in the entertainment industry [in Taiwan], but for everyone's good, merely limiting his workload is not enough. Hence I directly kicked him out of 183 Club." ("183 Club是團隊，不是哪一個人的，我知道在演藝圈沒這個先例，但為了大家好，光是冷凍他也不行，我直接踢他出183 Club。")

== Discography ==
=== Albums ===
- 告解 (November 2002)

== Filmography ==
=== TV ===
- TTV/SETTV: The Magicians of Love (2006)
- TTV: The Prince Who Turns into a Frog (2005)
- Sheng Kong Gao Fei 升空高飛 (2004)
- CTS/SETTV: La robe de Mariee des cieux (2004)
