= Ying Ye 3 Jia 1 =

Taiwanese drama television series

- Official poster
- Also known as: 樱野3加1; Sakurano
- Directed by: Yang Xuan; Chen Rong Hui
- Starring: Ming Dao; Joe Chen; Jerry Huang; Jason Hsu
- Opening theme: "Yes Sir!" (終極陷阱) by 5566
- Ending theme: "To Believe Again" (再次相信) by Ming Dao and Joe Chen
- Country of origin: Republic of China (Taiwan)
- Original language: Mandarin
- No. of episodes: 16

Production
- Executive producers: Hu Han Xing; Chen Yi Jun; Wang Li Ming

Original release
- Network: SET Metro & TTV
- Release: July 29 – November 11, 2007

Ying Ye 3 Jia 1 (Chinese: 樱野3加1), also known as Sakurano in the Philippines, is a 2007 Taiwanese drama starring Ming Dao, Joe Chen, Jerry Huang and Jason Hsu. It follows the adventure of an amateur detective group in high school. It aired on TTV/SETTV from July 29 to November 11, 2007 every Sunday.

== Synopsis ==
Xia Tian (Joe Chen), Jia Jiang (Ming Dao), Fang Wei (Jerry Huang) and Bulu (Jason Hsu) grew up together on Westside Street and are one month away from graduation at Ying Ye High School.

Xia Tian's father is a police officer on Westside Street. A day before his planned retirement, the friends have a fight at school and are almost expelled by the principal. Officer Xia goes to settle the conflict, but is unsuccessful, and his gun is misplaced. It is decided that they will remain at school but must find the gun before graduation.

== Cast and characters ==
=== Main ===
- Ming Dao as Yang Jia Jiang / Ah Jiang

Grew up with Xia Tian, Fang Wei and Bulu. He doesn't have a father, but promised him that he would protect their family and Xia Tian. He bullies Kong Long because Kong Long bullies his friends. He considers Officer Xia as his own father. His mother owns a food stall.

- Joe Chen as Xia Tian

Officer Xia's daughter. Her mom left her family a long time ago, but she has a strong relationship with her father. She always protects her friend, Xiao Hui, from Kong Long.

- Jerry Huang as Fang Wei

Comes from a rich family but his father is always busy with his work. After realizing that Ah Jiang also likes Xia Tian, he accepted Ah Jiang as his rival although Ah Jiang is his friend.

- Jason Hsu as Wang Dao Ren / Bulu

Likes cooking but his father wants him to run his martial arts class. He likes cleaning his room, doing housework and when he is in a bad mood, he likes to sew. If Ah Jiang and Fang Wei argue, he will try to stop them from fighting. He is secretly dating Xiao Hui.

=== Supporting ===
- Zhang Xin Yu as Zheng Wen Hui
- Liu Zhe Ying as Su Xiao Han
- Hang Li Ren as Kong Long

Leader of the Ying Ye Three Little Dragons.

- Ye Min Zhi as Wu Lu
- Lee Tien-chu as Officer Xia
- Viter Fan Zhi Wei as Hsu Ding Kai / Captain D.K. Hsu / Brother Frog

== Episode summary ==
No.	Title	Original release date
1	"Episode 1"	July 29, 2007
Xia Tian meets Xiao Hui on Westside Street to accompany her to sell something to Kong Long. After seeing Xiao Hui in trouble, Xia Tian, Ah Jiang, Fang Wei and Bulu get into a fight with Kong Long. Xiao Wei, a member of Kong Long's gang, sees how Kong Long is no match for Ah Jiang and his friends, coming up with the idea to seek Councilor Kong's help. Councilor Kong makes Ah Jiang and Kong Long's dispute the headline news for the next day, vilifying Ah Jiang. With Officer Xia's help, the principal requests Kong Long to reconcile with Ah Jiang. However, a phone call from Councilor Kong requests that the principal expel Ah Jiang, Fang Wei and Bulu from school. The principal has no choice but to expel Ah Jiang and his friends from school. Officer Xia, who plans to retire the next day, due to his assistance in helping to resolve this dispute, accidentally lost his gun on campus. The principal proposes that as long as Ah Jiang and his friends are able to help Officer Xia find his gun, they will not be expelled.
2	"Episode 2"	August 5, 2007
On her way home, Xia Tian finds out that her father lost his gun and decides to help him get it back. Ah Jiang, Fang Wei and Bulu are discussing how to help Officer Xia when Xia Tian shows up. She asks Ah Jiang to consider the principal's conditions. Ah Jiang has already decided to help but teases Xia Tian, and she runs out in tears. Ah Jiang sends a text message to Xia Tian telling her that he will go to school tomorrow. Early the next morning, Ah Jiang, Fang Wei and Bulu get into a car accident, have a conflict with a mysterious biker and are almost tardy. Kong Long makes a secret deal with Xia Tian: as long as she does not "Ah Lu Ka" him, he will ask his father to leave Ah Jiang alone. Ah Jiang, Fang Wei and Bulu arrive to help, but Xia Tian bites Ah Jiang to defend Kong Long. Ah Jiang says that he will not interfere with Xia Tian anymore and leaves. Fang Wei rushes after Ah Jiang and tells him that if Ah Jiang does not want to protect Xia Tian anymore, he will begin pursuing Xia Tian.
3	"Episode 3"	August 12, 2007
Ah Jiang does not understand Xia Tian's recent actions and is angry. He tells Fang Wei to pursue Xia Tian if he wants to. Xia Tian is asked to help Xiao Han confess her feelings to Ah Jiang, but has mixed feelings. In order to investigate Officer Xia's missing gun, everyone arrives at the Sunny Haunted House, but do not find any clues. Because Xia Tian is still mad at Ah Jiang, she stays at the Sunny Haunted House by herself to look for clues. A gunshot rings out through the house. There is a muddy footprint on the floor and an empty bullet shell within the thick patch of grass. Fang Wei suggests using Xia Tian's birthday as an excuse to give shoes to all the students so they can find everyone's shoe sizes and find the owner of the muddy footprint left at the scene. Early the next day, all the teachers and students gather in the auditorium. Fang Wei goes on stage and announces his gifting of shoes and Xia Tian's birthday. He continues to confess his feelings to Xia Tian when the lights turn off in the auditorium.
4	"Episode 4"	August 19, 2007
Fang Wei plans Xia Tian's birthday party. Xiao Hui leaves the party early for work, and Kong Long follows her. Bulu finds this suspicious and brings Ah Jiang along to follow them. When they are about to leave, they bump into Fang Wei who is trying to confess to Xia Tian. Ah Jiang stuffs a small gift at Xia Tian before he leaves. In a dark alley, Kong Long stops Xiao Hui and requests a refund. Xiao Hui refuses and cries for Xia Tian's help. When everyone arrives, they see Ah Jiang and Bulu holding up a badly beaten Kong Long. Dai Wei and Xiao Wei insist that Ah Jiang and Bulu beat Kong Long up to help Xiao Hui. Ah Jiang decides to take Kong Long to the hospital to be treated first. At the hospital, Councilor Kong arrives with a whole entourage. He insists that Ah Jiang and Bulu are the ones who have injured Kong Long. He demands they be taken to the police station. Xia Tian defends them, and Councilor Kong slaps her. Fang Wei discovers that Ah Jiang turned the lights off in the auditorium.
5	"Episode 5"	August 26, 2007
Fang Wei's confession at the auditorium which was ruined by Ah Jiang has put a major strain on their friendship. Kong Long's attack by a mysterious person leads to Councilor Kong's insistence in suing Ah Jiang and Bulu for injuring Kong Long. Despite the wedge driven in their friendship, Fang Wei finds a group of international lawyers from his father's company to help Ah Jiang and Bulu from being thrown into jail. Ah Jiang's heart is filled with appreciation and Fang Wei understands but they are still not speaking to each other. The results for the comparison of shoes are revealed, shocking Bulu. While taking Xiao Hui home, Bulu questions her. Xiao Hui is stunned and asks Bulu to keep it a secret. The next day, Xiao Hui secretly goes to the Sunny Haunted House and gives a sum of money to Grey Wolf. She asks Grey Wolf to help stop Councilor Kong. Councilor Kong gets threatened with BB pellets and a warning note, and he immediately drops the charges against Ah Jiang and Bulu.
6	"Episode 6"	September 2, 2007
Because of his conflict with Councilor Kong, Ah Jiang's family's shop in Guan Dong gets destroyed. Ah Jiang surrenders to Councilor Kong. He agrees to publicly reconcile with the Kong family at the tea party that Councilor Kong is holding. Xia Tian decides to go look for the surveillance footage from Li Chang's office of the day when Kong Long was beaten. Fang Wei follows her and they look for evidence to clear Ah Jiang's name. They get locked inside the basement. They spend the night together searching for Ah Jiang and the next morning, they bump into Xiao Wei, who has arrived to organize the warehouse. Xiao Wei takes a photo of Xiao Tian and Fang Wei together which triggers Ah Jiang's jealousy. Ah Jiang goes alone to the tea party that Councilor Kong is holding at Westside Street. He is forced to go on stage to make a public apology and reinforce Councilor Kong's contribution to the local area. Ah Jiang and Xia Tian have reconciled, and everyone urges Ah Jiang to repay Xia Tian with a kiss for her hard work to help him. After arguing, they stand face to face and prepare to kiss.
7	"Episode 7"	September 9, 2007
Ah Jiang and Xia Tian are happily celebrating with everyone. Fang Wei leaves early for his father's banquet, and Xiao Han accompanies him. Xiao Hui leaves with Bulu, saying that her grandmother wants her at home. A half-drunk Xia Tian and Ah Jiang are left alone. Officer Xia needs to prepare to arrest Grey Wolf and asks Ah Jiang to take Xia Tian back to his place to spend the night. At the banquet, there is a heated argument. Fang Wei reveals the hopes he has for his family. When he does not get his desired response, he angrily leaves. Xiao Han comforts him and supports his pursuit of Xia Tian. On the way home, Xia Tian confesses her feelings to Ah Jiang, causing him to struggle with his feelings internally. Ah Jiang kisses Xia Tian to stop her grumbling and nagging, which Fang Wei witnesses. Early in the morning, everyone gathers at Sunny Haunted House to watch Kong Long clean. Kong Long is scared away. They separate to catch Kong Long. Xia Tian notices that something moving in the bush behind the haunted house. She catches Grey Wolf, and a gun falls out of his pocket.
8	"Episode 8"	September 16, 2007
Xia Tian is being held at gunpoint. Ah Jiang charges toward Grey Wolf to protect Xia Tian. Grey Wolf is startled and shoots Ah Jiang. During his surgery, one of Ah Jiang's arteries burst and his heart stops beating. He is admitted into the intensive care unit and placed under a 24-hour observation period. Ah Jiang gets up from bed and returns home, where he sees his dead grandmother. When he returns to the hospital, he sees a grieving Xia Tian. Ah Jiang shouts loudly and runs to hug her but cannot touch her and receives no response. Xia Tian reminisces her memories with Ah Jiang as she looks at the first birthday present he gave her. She discovers the firefly that Ah Jiang drew with a message. Xia Tian decides to look for autumn fireflies and hopes her blessings for Ah Jiang will come true. However, the farm in her memories turns out to be a barren land. Xia Tian looks around, and a dog suddenly barks and chases her. She panics, scaling a wall into someone's house. A handsome young guy holds up a gun to stop her.
9	"Episode 9"	September 23, 2007
After Ah Jiang's near death experience, his relationship with Xia Tian deepens. Fang Wei gives them his sincere blessings and gives up on Xia Tian. Ah Jiang will be released from the hospital soon. Xia Tian, Fang Wei, Bulu and Xiao Han all come. Xiao Hui tells everyone about her, her grandma and Grey Wolf's relationship. Everyone forgives Xiao Hui and Grey Wolf. Councilor Kong discovers that the gun that Kong Long picked up is Officer Xia's gun. Xia Tian takes Ah Jiang to "Mob Boss" D.K. Xu's house to return his coat and express her gratitude. However, he is not home but at a baseball field meeting with a few Thai people over a drug deal. After Officer Xia and Xiao Gu find out, they surround the baseball field. The criminals were able to escape. The Police Bureau Investigation Unit immediately asked Officer Xia and Xiao Gu to report back to the bureau.
10	"Episode 10"	September 30, 2007
Officer Xia and Xiao Gu failed in their duty to capture the drug dealers and have been ordered to report back to the Police Bureau Investigation Unit. Councilor Kong accidentally helps Officer Xia retrieve his lost gun. D.K. turns out to be the orphan of a bystander who was injured by a stray bullet 10 years ago when Officer Xia was trying to capture criminals. At that time, Officer Xia temporarily gave shelter to D.K., and he was then adopted by his relatives in the United States. D.K. is actually a police officer and, in order to arrest international drug lord Du Xiao, had become an undercover cop. D.K. and Officer Xia's reunion causes Xia Tian to remember her childhood. Xia Tian and D.K. talk about their past. Fang Wei and Bulu help plan a date for Ah Jiang. Fang Wei provides one of his family's villas on a private island for Ah Jiang to use. At the vacation villa, Xia Tian joyfully anticipates the first date that Ah Jiang planned. Fang Wei, Bulu, Du Xiao, D.K. and the special crimes unit unexpectedly show up.
11	"Episode 11"	October 7, 2007
Xia Tian becomes embarrassed. The plan that D.K. spent three years on also failed. Ah Jiang admits that his childish manner towards love caused Xia Tian to get hurt. Though Xia Tian is angry and hurt, she has already forgiven Ah Jiang. However, Ah Jiang does not know that and is trying to think of ways to make it up to Xia Tian. D.K. injured himself with his own gun. Xia Tian carefully picks up the pieces of the wind chime that he stepped on and returns it to D.K. In order to resolve D.K. and Ah Jiang's misunderstanding, Xia Tian spends the night making a new wind chime. The next morning, she wakes up D.K. and goes with him to hang the wind chime at the street corner where he and his girlfriend broke up. D.K. is touched, kissing and hugging Xia Tian surprising her and Ah Jiang, a witness. Ah Jiang treats Xia Tian coldly. Ying Ye School specially arranges a self-defense class for everyone, taught by D.K. Xu. Ah Jiang is called to the stage for a demonstration.
12	"Episode 12"	October 14, 2007
Fang Wei and Bulu search for evidence to help Ah Jiang prove to Xia Tian that D.K. has ulterior motives. Ah Jiang temporarily becomes a stunt driver under Bulu's father's introduction. He asks for half of the pay in advance and takes Xia Tian shopping for prom. Xia Tian writes that she wants to be "Guan Dong Shop’s boss" in the future, which D.K. shows to her father. Officer Xia then questions how to plan her future. D.K. suggests she join the Federal Law Enforcement Training Centers. Officer Xia hopes that Xia Tian will go to the U.S. to advance her studies as per D.K.’s suggestion. However, Xia Tian doesn’t want to spend all of her father’s retirement money and leave Westside Street. Ah Jiang’s temporary job is in an advertisement music video shoot for the celebrity Joyce. D.K. arrives to assist and patrol the area around the set, and Xia Tian accompanies him.
13	"Episode 13"	October 21, 2007
Fang Wei, Xiao Han and Xiao Hui keep Bulu company at the library overnight while he finishes his graduation paper. They discover an article called "Psychology of an Avenger", written by D.K. In the case, when the murderer was a child, he witnessed his mother's death from a police officer's stray bullet. He swears to become a police officer and carry out his revenge on the daughter of the police officer who killed his mother. Officer Xia shows his daughter a huge picture of Joyce kissing Ah Jiang published as headline news in the entertainment section of a newspaper. Xia Tian helps Ah Jiang explain that it is media manipulation. Ah Jiang and Xia Tian meet on the road, and he persuades her to go study criminology in the United States. Xia Tian applies for a job, but it is to recruit customers for an X-rated motel. She is arrested and taken to the police station for indecent behavior in public. Ah Jiang loses control while performing the driving stunt and injures his eye but continues filming.
14	"Episode 14"	October 28, 2007
Despite the dance having ended, Xia Tian insists on waiting in the downpour for Ah Jiang. Ah Jiang calls D.K., asking him to pick up Xia Tian. He watches helplessly as D.K. takes the sick Xia Tian away. The next morning, D.K. confesses his feelings to Xia Tian. She rejects him and leaves to question Ah Jiang. Joyce arrives at Ah Jiang's house to ask him to be her bodyguard. Ah Jiang puts on an act with Joyce to convince Xia Tian to leave him and pursue a better future. Fang Wei and Bulu, who came with his diploma, angrily leave with Xia Tian. Joyce notices his eye injury, telling him to see a doctor. D.K. has not caught Solomen yet and hides at Officer Xia's house for a few days. His landlord calls him, telling him there are strange sounds coming from his house, and the police dog he raised has been missing for several days. D.K. gathers the special police force to discuss their next course of action. The 100th episode of a popular variety show is being filmed at the amusement park. Xia Tian decides to participate to get Ah Jiang's attention.
15	"Episode 15"	November 4, 2007
Xia Tian jumps down from a high building and Ah Jiang catches her but turns Xia Tian over to D.K., telling her that her future is in the hands of D.K. He leaves and Xia Tian is heartbroken. Joyce cannot stand Ah Jiang's actions and scolds him before firing him. Xia Tian decides to go to the U.S. to study. Fang Wei and Bulu still doubt D.K. Fang Wei and Bulu invite Xiao Han and Xiao Hui to plan a farewell camping party. They also hope to expose D.K.’s conspiracy as soon as possible. Ah Jiang's vision is getting worse and worse, and the doctor's answer causes him to lose hope. Officer Xia has help capture Solomen with D.K. before his retirement. Solomen got away the first time, but after three years of planning, D.K. wants to goad him and capture him.
16	"Episode 16"	November 11, 2007
Taking shelter from the rain, Xia Tian and Ah Jiang spend the night in a small log cabin. Three years later, Xia Tian and D.K. arrives at Ah Jiang's house, inviting everyone to their wedding. Ah Jiang watches as they leave, and shouts her name loudly, but it turns out to be a dream. After working all night, Bulu breaks through D.K.’s password. In the morning, Ah Jiang leaves to look for Fang Wei and Bulu. Fang Wei translates D.K.’s article for everyone. As they drive to Officer Xia, their car breaks down. Xiao Han and Xiao Hui stay behind to wait for a tow truck while Ying Ye 3+1 rush to the harbor. D.K. pushes Officer Xia to the frontline as outlined in the article. Solomen arrives and uses Officer Xia as a shield to threaten D.K. The friends arrive at the scene and witness D.K. telling Solomen to kill this person who is his enemy. They create a distraction, successfully capturing Solomen, but the timed bomb tied to Officer Xia begins ticking. D.K. turns over the honor of capturing Solomen to Ying Ye 3+1 and Officer Xia.

== Soundtrack ==
Ying Ye 3 + 1

Soundtrack album by 5566, Joe Chen, Jason Hsu, Ming Dao
- Released: March 8, 2007
- Genre: Mandopop
- Language: Mandarin

Ying Ye 3 + 1 Original Soundtrack (Chinese: 櫻野三加一 電視原聲帶) was released on March 8, 2007 by 5566, Joe Chen, Jason Hsu, and Ming Dao. It contains eleven songs, five of which are instrumental versions of the five original songs. The opening theme song is "Yes Sir!" by 5566, while the ending theme song "To Believe Again" is by Ming Dao and Joe Chen.

=== Track listing ===
No.	Title	Singer(s)	Length
1.	"Yes Sir!" (終極陷阱; 'ultimate trap')	5566
2.	"Savage Girlfriend" (野蠻女友)	Joe Chen
3.	"Nothing's Impossible" (沒有不可能)	Jason Hsu
4.	"Tracing & Catching" (逮捕灰狼; 'arrest grey wolf') (Inst.)
5.	"Prime Mission" (頭條任務) (Inst.)
6.	"You Do Know Me" (其實你懂我)	Joe Chen
7.	"Memory of Midsummer" (仲夏的回憶) (Inst.)
8.	"Foggy Love Affair" (愛在七里霧; 'love in the seven li fog') (Inst.)
9.	"Looking for My Best Friends" (尋友啟示)	Ming Dao and Jason Hsu
10.	"On the Same Street" (同一個街道) (Inst.)
11.	"To Believe Again" (再次相信)	Joe Chen and Ming Dao

== Episode ratings ==
Episode	Nationwide
01	2.58
02	2.18
03	2.31
04	2.85
05	2.45
06	2.16
07	2.62
08	2.34
09	1.91
10	1.88
11	2.11
12	1.72
13	1.58
14	1.60
15	2.16
16	2.58
average	2.19

Source: Chinatimes Showbiz
