= The Prince Who Turns into a Frog =

- Promotional poster
- Also known as: Frog Prince
- Genre: Romance; Comedy
- Directed by: Chen Ming Zhang; Liu Jun Jie
- Starring: Ming Dao; Joe Chen; Sam Wang; Joyce Chao
- Opening theme: "迷魂計" (Enhancing Trick) by 183 Club
- Ending theme: "真愛" (True Love) by 183 Club
- Country of origin: Republic of China (Taiwan)
- Original language: Mandarin
- No. of episodes: 20(TV version) 30(Online version)

Production
- Production locations: Tainan, Taiwan
- Running time: 90 mins
- Production company: Sanlih E-Television (SET)

Original release
- Network: Taiwan Television (TTV)
- Release: 5 June – 16 October 2005

Related
- Mr Fighting (格鬥天王); Green Forest My Home (綠光森林)

The Prince Who Turns into a Frog (traditional Chinese: 王子變青蛙; simplified Chinese: 王子变青蛙; pinyin: Wángzǐ biàn qīngwā) is a 2005 Taiwanese drama starring Ming Dao, Joe Chen, Sam Wang, and Joyce Chao. It was produced by Sanlih E-Television and directed by Chen Ming Zhang (陳銘章) and Liu Jun Jie (劉俊傑).

The series was first broadcast in Taiwan on free-to-air Taiwan Television (TTV) (台視) from 5 June 2005 to 16 October 2005, every Sunday at 21:30 and cable TV Sanlih E-Television (三立電視) from 11 June 2005 to 22 October 2005, every Saturday at 21:00. Episode seven was broadcast on 17 July 2005, which achieved an average rating of 7.05 and peaked at 8.05 and was the highest peak for a single episode for an idol drama until 2008.

The series was well-received, became one of the most popular Taiwanese idol dramas throughout Asia and brought Ming Dao and Joe Chen to prominence.

== Summary ==
Shan Jun Hao (Ming Dao), the CEO of a large hotel chain, is the stereotypical heir: spoiled, cold-hearted, and ruthless. He meets Ye Tian Yu (Joe Chen), a schemer and somewhat of a gold-digger, who accidentally runs him over. This car accident causes Jun Hao to lose his memory; he becomes kindhearted and loving. Just as love is in the air, Jun Hao's family comes looking for him, desperate for his return to his original home. Jun Hao has a fiancée Fan Yun Xi (Joyce Chao) who loves him very much, waiting for him to come home. More accidents follow: Jun Hao loses his memories of Tian Yu and returns to his original spoiled self. Although Jun Hao returns to thinking of Tian Yu as a lying schemer, a surprising new love gradually blossoms.

== Story ==
Shan Jun Hao (Ming Dao), hated by many people for his personality, gets hit by a car in a planned accident on the day of his wedding with Fan Yun Xi (Joyce Chao), a woman who loves Jun Hao. Ye Tian Yu (Joe Chen), who thought that it was her fault for crashing into the unconscious Jun Hao, brings him home, because she doesn't want to get arrested. He wakes up but doesn't remember anything of his past, so Ye Zheng Zhe, Tian Yu's brother, told her that his name is Dang Ou, their illegal cousin and allowed him to stay in their Money Coming store. Tian Yu and Dang Ou slowly develop feelings for each other. During this time, Xu Zi Qian (Sam Wang), a close friend of Shan Jun Hao, and Fa Yun Xi also begin to develop feelings for each other after they had given up looking for Jun Hao. Love and romance fills these two couples up. However, good times never last. Xu Zi Qian finds Dang Ou, and together with Yun Xi, forces Tian Yu to return Dang Ou. Tian Yu is granted one last day. After their last date, Tian Yu brings Dang Ou back to his real home. But Dang Ou doesn't give up and searches for Tian Yu. When he finally finds her, he gets hit on the head by gangsters and forgets the memories as Dang Ou and the sweet moments with Tian Yu. Then he becomes Shan Jun Hao again. Xu Zi Qian is in pain as well, because he loves Fan Yun Xi, but she has a blind loyalty to Shan Jun Hao, and almost immediately dumps Xu Zi Qian. Everything was back to "normal."

But love will not disappear easily. Ye Tian Yu meets Shan Jun Hao again. But Jun Hao does not clearly recall anything about Tian Yu, only loving memories of Fan Yun Xi. Being crushed, Xu Zi Qian and Ye Tian Yu start dating in order to forget about Jun Hao and Yun Xi. However, Jun Hao starts to develop feelings for Tian Yu as Jun Hao and not Dang-Ou. Zhang Min Han, the deputy-GM of Senwell, digs up information about the Shan's history between them and Yun Xi. When this is revealed to Xu Zi Qian and her ill-ridden mother, the mother dies of a heart-attack. Xu Zi Qian develops a mental and emotional breakdown and needs Tian Yu. But when he needed her the most, she was embracing Jun Hao during his wedding reception with Yun Xi. The constant/random encounters cause Jun Hao to slowly remember his life with Tian Yu and the side of Dang Ou awakens again.

At this point, Jun Hao then tells Tian Yu everything he feels for her at their wedding reception, in front of everybody, including Xu Zi Qian and Fan Yun Xi. Knowing it was a forbidden love, Tian Yu runs away in tears. Since she did, Xu Zi Qian's emotions become more violent, to the point where his naturally kind and gentle-hearted personality becomes harsh and unkind. He becomes the rightful owner of Senwell. Zhang Min Han, in hopes for a higher position, did this on purpose to Zi Qian, but it had gotten too far. At this point, Zi Qian believed all the problems of his life were Senwell's fault and begins to sell it. Fan Yun Xi later that day decided to divorce Jun Hao for his happiness, but because of her obsessive dreams of having a family, she too has a mental/emotional breakdown.

Jun Hao/Dang Ou returns to Tian Yu and they begin to pick up where they left off. Coincidentally, Xi Qian receives a call to pick up Fan Yun Xi because she fell into a river. Both are currently mentally and emotionally unstable, but Zi Qian, seeing Yun Xi in her state, gets angrier at Senwell and blames them for this. Zhang Min Han, in desperation, needs help for the person he brought down, Shan Jun Hao. Together, they stopped Xu Zi Qian from doing a huge mistake. Yun Xi, probably because of the moment, remembers that it was not Jun Hao that was there for her first, but Zi Qian, and she falls for him again. Zi Qian, after this incident, snaps out of it, and realizes that he loves Yun Xi too. They escape from a signing that will transfer all Senwell holdings to Queen Ann Mary Hotel, but the hotel sends people to stop them, causing Tian Yu to get knocked unconscious. Awakening after a month, she pretends to also lose her memory. But Junhao manages to win her back again. In the end, Tian Yu and Jun Hao get married, and Zi Qian and Yun Xi become a couple of travelers.

== Characters ==
Drama character	Actor	Characteristics
Shan Jun Hao (單均昊) / Dang Ou (茼蒿)	Ming Dao	Age: 28. As the GM of the Senwell Hotel Group, he takes his work very seriously. Many people dislike him for his successful but ruthless approach to managing and are waiting for the day he receives his just deserts. Deep down, Jun Hao actually has a nice side to his personality, though it is not seen at work where he must be fierce in such a competitive world. This side of him is brought out after a car accident which causes him to adopt the identity "Dang Ou." Though he and Shan Jun Hao are one, Dang Ou seems to appear as the other side of Jun Hao's heart. After an accident, he is brought to Tian Yu's house where he regains consciousness. Upon waking up, he realizes that he has lost his memory and cannot even remember his identity. Tian Yu's cunning mother decides that they need to make one up for him. Ye Tian Yu's whimsical little brother, Ye Zheng Zhe, creates the name "Dang Ou". From there, the family tells him that he is Tian Yu's distant cousin who was brought there illegally and is now in hiding. He is the complete opposite of his mental counterpart. He's quite the gentleman and does his best to please others. Because he cannot remember Fan Yun Xi, nor his dislike of Tian Yu, it is during this time that he falls in love with Tian Yu.
Ye Tian Yu (葉天瑜)	Joe Chen	Age: 23. Because her family has financial problems, Ye Tian Yu knows money is very important. She will lie about anything for money and is always looking to make quick money. Many people see her as a rash, classless, cheat, but she's actually a very caring and well-meaning girl. Her greatest wish is to marry a wealthy man, till Dang Ou (Shan Jun hao) appears. Unaware that he is the multimillionaire Jun Hao, she at first resists the urge to fall in love with him, but it is soon clear that she becomes infatuated with Dang Ou. She cannot hold her liquor well.
Xu Zi Qian (徐子騫)	Sam Wang	Age: 29. Xu Zi Qian was adopted by the Shan family after a mysterious gas explosion kills his father and leaves his mother in a comatose state. He spends a long time pondering about the circumstances of their deaths, even considering that the accident was not an accident after all. It is not until he is older that he learns the truth. Xu Zi Qian is the Head Director of Senwell, and he has a more caring personality than Shan Jun Hao. He is deeply love with Fan Yun Xi and cares for her deeply; whenever Yun Xi is upset, he always makes her smile her by giving her a piece of her favorite candy. However, he "loses" her to Shan Jun Hao, because of Fan Yun Xi's infatuation with Jun Hao. This makes him at bitter to Shan Jun Hao and creates tension between the two. He likes Ye Tian Yu and finds her a good person, because she lets him enjoy her family after he admits he's never felt like part of Shan Jun Hao's.
Fan Yun Xi (范芸熙)	Joyce Chao	Age: 23. She was left by her parents at Senwell, and has been living with the Shan's since. Although Xu Zi Qian is always there for her, she only has eyes for Shan Jun Hao because she believed that Shan Jun Hao was the first person to care for her after being left behind by her mother at Senwell. She is smart and beautiful, and always tries to please Shan Jun Hao. She has never got over her childhood memories of getting left behind by her mother and is very insecure and childish in nature. Ever since she was young, she was groomed to become Shan Jun Hao's perfect bride, and so it has always been a childhood dream of hers to be a pretty bride and marry Shan Jun Hao. Fan Yun Xi is his childhood friend who came to live with them after she was abandoned by her mother as a child. Ever since they were young, his parents brought him up with the ideology that he and Yun Xi were to marry each other. At one point, his mother admits that it was "her greatest dream/desire" to see them married.
Zhang Ming Han (張明寒)	Gino Tsai	Age: 27. He is the Vice President of Senwell. Inheriting his father's intelligence and management skills, he feels that he is most qualified to become general manager. But because he does not hold a majority of the Senwell's stock, he can only retain the title Deputy GM. He opposes Jun Hao completely and regards him as an enemy and the downfall of Senwell. When Jun Hao disappears, he tries convincing Jun Hao's mother to pledge him GM but fails. Next, he schemed to use the truth of Zi Qian's parents' mysterious death in order to win control of Senwell. Not realizing how much it would damage Zi Qian, those surrounding him, and more importantly Senwell itself, he ultimately returns to Jun Hao to help him bring Zi Qian back to his senses.
Li Da Wei	Ehlo Huang	Age: 26. He is Jun Hao's trusted partner and assistant. He is slightly less serious than Jun Hao and tends to contradict him. But, whenever Jun Hao needs to resolve an internal conflict, he turns to him for support.
Ye Zheng Zhe (葉正哲)	Anthony Xie	Age: 17. Ye Tian Yu's whimsical little brother, who has brilliant moments and not so brilliant ones. He is the one that created the name Dang Ou while Jun Hao was having amnesia.

== Location ==
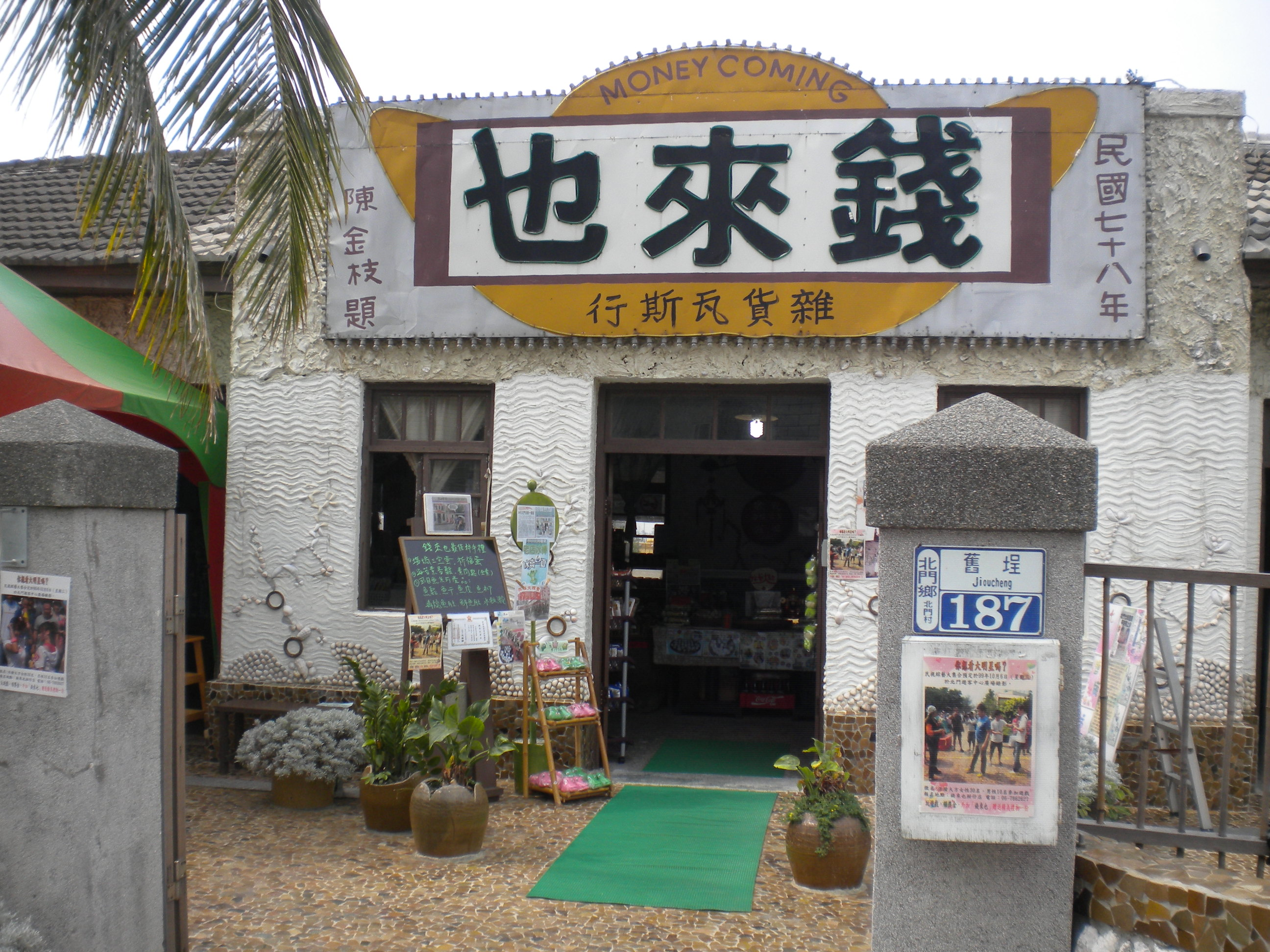
Money Coming store at Southwest Coast National Scenic Area

- Money Coming store – Southwest Coast National Scenic Area, Tainan City, Beimen District in Taiwan
- Senwell Hotel Group – Tainan City

== Cast ==
=== Main cast ===
- Joe Chen as Ye Tian Yu (葉天瑜)
- Ming Dao as Shan Jun Hao (單均昊) and Dang Ou (茼蒿)
- Sam Wang as Xu Zi Qian (徐子騫)
- Joyce Chao as Fan Yun Xi (范芸熙)
- Gino Tsai as Zhang Ming Han (張明寒)
- Su Li Xin as Su Li Xin (蘇立欣)
- Wang Juan (王琄) as Chen Jin Zhi (陳金枝)

=== Extended Cast ===
- Li Dai Ling as Jiang Cai Yue (江采月)
- Ehlo Huang Yu Rong as Li Da Wei (李大偉)
- Zhao Shun as Tang Shun Ming (唐順明)
- Cheng Bo Ren as Li Tong Luo (李銅鑼)
- Anthony Xie as Ye Zheng Zhe (葉正哲)
- Yun Zhong Yue as Shan Yao Rong (單耀榮)
- Lu Man Yin (呂曼茵) as Wu Yue Jiao (吴月嬌) / Wu Feng Jiao (吴鳳嬌)
- Qiu Long Jie as Tong Hua Shun (童花順)
- Na Wei Xun as Chuan Yu Nan
- Hu Pei Wei as Wang Pin Sheng
- Yang Hao as Gary
- Yen Hsing-su as Xie Quan (謝全)
- Jacky Chu as Huang Mai Ke (黃麥克)
- Sun Xing
- Hu Kang Xing (胡康星) as Ah Sheng (阿勝)
- Renzo Liu as Ding Yuan Xun (丁元勳)
- Sonia Sui as Dai An Fen (黛安芬)

== Soundtrack ==
The Prince Who Turns into a Frog

Soundtrack album by 183 Club, 7 Flowers, VJ
- Released: 13 January 2006
- Genre: Mandopop
- Language: Mandarin
- Label: Warner Music Taiwan

The Prince Who Turns into a Frog Original Soundtrack (王子變青蛙 電視原聲帶) was released on 13 January 2006 by 183 Club, 7 Flowers and VJ under Sony Music Entertainment (Taiwan). It contains eleven songs, in which four songs are various instrumental versions of the original songs. The opening theme song is "迷魂計" or "Enhancing Trick", while the ending theme song is entitled "真愛" or "Pure Love", both sung by 183 Club.

=== Track listing ===
No.	Title	Singer(s)	Length
1.	"Enticing Trick" (迷魂計)	183 Club
2.	"Wonderful Day inst."
3.	"Magical Smile" (魔法 Smile)	183 Club
4.	"Bye! Boy"	7 Flowers
5.	"Latina inst."
6.	"Not Brave Enough" (不夠勇敢)	VJ
7.	"Memory Puzzle inst." (失去記憶最初的愛)
8.	"All I Want" (我只想要)	7 Flowers
9.	"Wake Up inst." (醒醒)
10.	"Call my Name" (閉上眼默唸3遍)	183 Club and 7 Flowers
11.	"Pure Love" (真愛)	183 Club

== Remakes ==
It was unofficially a remake of Save the Last Dance for Me, a South Korean TV series aired in 2004. It was then remade in Indonesia as Aku Bukan Untukmu (I'm not for you) in 2005, as Waking Love Up in 2015 and Forget You Remember Love in 2020, respectively, in Mainland China.
