= My MVP Valentine =

- MVP情人
- Genre: Romantic comedy, Sports, Teenager
- Screenplay by: Lo Tsai-Chuan; Yeh Feng-Ying; Yang Suhui
- Directed by: Liu Chun-Chieh; Chen Ming-Chang
- Starring: Angela Zhang; Johnny Yen; Tony Sun; 5566; David Chen
- Opening theme: Wu Suo Wei (無所謂； Doesn't Matter) - 5566
- Ending theme: Wo Nan Guo (我難過； I'm Sad) - 5566
- Composer: Hsi Yu-Lung
- Country of origin: Taiwan
- Original language: Mandarin
- No. of episodes: 28 (30 in some countries)

Production
- Executive producer: Hou Teng-Jui; Chen Chi-Ting; Hsieh Jui-Yun
- Producer: Chen Yu-Shan
- Production location: Taiwan
- Camera setup: Hsiao Sheng-Ming
- Running time: approximately 45 minutes

Original release
- Network: SET Metro, CTS; RCTI (Indonesia)
- Release: July 24 – August 30, 2002

My MVP Valentine (Chinese: MVP情人) is a 2002 Taiwanese romantic sports teen drama based loosely on two Japanese manga series: Slam Dunk and MVP wa Yuzurenai! (MVPは譲れない!；Can't Give up MVP!). Starring Chinese Taipei basketball star Johnny Yen Hsing-su (who led the 2003 FIBA Asia Championship in assists), it enjoyed huge success throughout Greater China and Southeast Asia. As a result, it is noted for marking the acting debuts of Yen, Angela Zhang, Joe Chen Chiao-En and 5566 (all five members had roles in the series), skyrocketing them to fame. This series is also the only project to star Gao Tien-chi, who was also a former basketball player like Johnny Yen, in his acting career.

== Premise ==
Riding his motorcycle to the National High School Basketball Championship game, Duan Chenfeng accidentally hits and paralyzes Angel, the sister of his main rival Iceman. After Iceman leaves the game for the hospital, Duan Chenfeng wins the championship and the MVP Award but is overtaken by guilt. He quietly quits school and basketball to take care of Angel, leaving his loving girlfriend Xiao Xi heartbroken. Soon the calculating Angel develops feelings for Duan Chenfeng, as the charming Prince vows to win Xiao Xi's heart. Meanwhile, Xiao Xi organizes a basketball team for her school and is determined to transform it from a perennial laughingstock to a respectable power.

== Cast ==
- Angela Zhang as Tian Yuxi (田羽希), affectionately called "Xiao Xi" (literally "Little Xi")

Team manager of the Chi Sui basketball Team. At the beginning of the series, she was dating Duan Chenfeng. After finding out that Chi Sui's basketball team was a champion 30 years before, she set about to reform the broken team to once again capture the coveted title. As the series progresses, she ends up breaking up with Duan Chenfeng and starts dating Prince.

- Johnny Yen Hsing-su as "Johnny" Duan Chenfeng (段臣風)

Small forward. MVP of the previous season and league champion with Rui An. After an accident before the final game that crowned him champion causes the paralysis of Iceman's sister, he quits basketball in self-exile and leaves school to take up part time jobs to finance the medical expenses of Angel. Eventually joining the Chi Sui team as he tries his hardest to win Xiao Xi back.

- Tony Sun as "William" Liu Hua (劉驊) a.k.a. "Prince" (太子)

Nicknamed Prince due to his status as the son of the President of the Parent's Association. He was a student at the prestigious Yun Shang but in order to woo Xiao Xi he transfers to Chi Sui and even joins the basketball team without any prior experience in the game. Full of confidence, his signature catchphrase is, "What others can't do. I can" that has been proven time and again.

- David Chen as "Iceman" Ming An (明安)

Yun Shang's best player, Duan Chenfeng's Rival. They were set to finally play against each other but an accident putting his sister Angel in critical condition forces him to abandon the game. When he finds out that Duan Chenfeng caused the accident, he resented him. Eventually when his sister falls in love with Duan Chenfeng, he forces Xiao Xi to break up with Chenfeng in return, he will get Chenfeng back on the court.

- Michelle Lin (林立雯) as "Angel" Ming Juan (明涓), Iceman's sister

A promising cellist and Iceman's sister. After the accident, she loses the use of her legs. Duan Chenfeng begins looking after her in repentance and she eventually falls in love with him.

- Lee Hsing-wen as Dong Qishen (董奇深), basketball coach

Formerly known as the best basketball coach in the country while he was Yun Shang's head coach. But after the loss to Rui An, he loses everything. While taking up odd jobs to make ends meet, he is constantly harassed by his former boss, Principal Zhang. Eventually, he is hired by Chi Sui to be the team's new coach.

- Gao Tien-chi (高天騏) as Gao Xing (高興)

Point guard. The school's bad boy. Formerly a MVP and top player in middle school but a career-ending injury forces him into early retirement, forcing him to resent the game he loves. But after the Chi Sui team helps him during an altercation with his gang, he joins the team in return.

- Joe Chen Chiao-en as "Barbie" Fang Yixue (方亦雪)

Prince's childhood friend and self-proclaimed fiancée. Loves everything pink.

- Jason Hsu as Xia Zhiyuan (夏智原) a.k.a. "DJ"

When he displays his dribbling skills to the club during their recruitment drive, the team quickly wanted to recruit him. He only wanted to join the team because he wanted to attract more attention from the girls of the school but eventually comes to love the game.

- Zax Wang (王仁甫) as Kang Yong (康勇) a.k.a. "Killer" (殺手)

The comic relief, joined the team only after a deal with Prince was made after Prince witnessed his shooting skills on the basketball arcade machine, expecting the skills to translate over. It is eventually revealed that his brother has been extorting money out of him and the situation only got better when his brother looked for him at school and was confronted by Duan Chenfeng. He is best known to perform best under pressure.

- Sam Wang as Wang Shaowei (紹偉)

Yu Shang's team captain and number 2.

- Rio Peng (彭康育) as "Little Knife" (小刀)

Prince's friend.

- Lu Jian-Yu (陸建宇) as Wei Chengkuan (魏承寬) a.k.a. "Black Bear" (黑熊)

Chi Sui's Team Captain and Center. He loves the game but his studies sets him back. He eventually works hard enough to get back on the team.

- Yen Yun-Hao (顏允浩) as Lu Yanji (吕延基) a.k.a. "Frog" (田雞)

One of Chi Sui's original members.

- Hsia Jing-Ting (夏靖庭) as Tian Qingzhong (田慶中), Xiao Xi's father and school principal
- Chen Kuan-Lun (陳冠綸) as Dong Qiang (董強), affectionately called "Qiang Qiang", Dong Qishen's son
- Ko Shu-yuan (柯叔元) as Johnson, a rival basketball coach for Yun Shang who replaced Dong Qisheng.
- Yang Chieh-mei as Fan Chunyi (范春儀), Liu Hua's mother
- Tao Chuan-Cheng (陶傳正) as Principal Zhang of Yunshang
- Huang Yuling (黃郁玲) as Wenwen, Xiao Xi's friend
- Tommy Peng (彭志豪) as Zhihao (志豪), Prince's friend
- Lee Ho-hao (李厚豪) as Kang Zhongnan (康中南), Kaidong's basketball player
- King Kong Lee as Qiu Yongqiang (邱永強), Yongxu's basketball player
- Chen Ruoping (陳若萍) as Ruoping, Dong Qishen's wife
- Wu Chuan-hao (吳權浩) as Liu Hua's housekeeper
- Yen Hsiao-ming (嚴孝銘) as fiancé of Qiangqiang's mother
- Xiao Bing (小兵) as reporter
- Song Dongbin (宋東彬) as sports announcer
- Jiang Zhongbo (江中博) as sports commentator
- Chang Chung-tien (常中天) as Yunshang's basketball scout
- Ambrose Hui (許紹洋) as gangster

== Alternative ending ==
After the series aired, 5566 released a song titled "Without Your Love", whose MV (also starring Angela Zhang) showed an alternative ending to the story.

== Soundtrack ==
The My MVP Valentine soundtrack was released on two CDs produced by Avex Trax-Taiwan. The first disc contains four songs from 5566, the lead cast, while the second disc is a compilation of various J-pop and K-pop songs.

- Wu Suo Wei (無所謂; Doesn't Matter) – 5566
- Wo Nan Guo (我難過; I'm Sad) – 5566
- Tiao Bo (挑撥; Instigation) – 5566
- Zen Yang (怎樣; What's Up) – 5566
- Break! Go! – DA PUMP
- So Tell Me – Heartsdales
- Tangerine Dream – Do As Infinity
- FAT FREE – hitomi
- BOY MEETS GIRL – TRF (DJ KOO Remix)
- Gamble Rumble – move
- SEVEN – Mariko Ide
- The Shining – K Dub Shine
- Perfect Man – Shinhwa
- Shout – Shinhwa
- Sea of Love – Fly to the Sky
- No.1 – BoA
- Neul.. (늘..; waiting...) – BoA

Some songs not included in the soundtrack album include:

- "i will" – Namie Amuro
- "injury" – HAL
- Dearest – Ayumi Hamasaki
- Every Heart – BoA
