= Sam Wang (actor) =

Taiwanese actor, singer and model

- Born: Wang Shaowei (王紹偉); December 18, 1976 (age 48); Republic of China
- Occupation(s): Actor, singer
- Musical career
- Also known as: Jiao Di Di (嬌滴滴), Shao Ye (少爺), Batman (蝙蝠侠), Strongest Man in 5566 (史上最强5566), Sailor Moon (月光女仙子), Math's Hero (数学小飞侠)
- Genres: Mandopop
- Labels: Jungiery
- Formerly of: 183 Club; 5566
- Website: http://shaowei56183.spaces.live.com/

Sam Wang (Chinese: 王紹偉; pinyin: Wáng Shàowěi) is a Taiwanese actor, singer and a model. Sam is a member of two Taiwanese groups 5566 and 183 Club.

== Biography ==
Sam Wang Shao Wei started playing Soccer when the class 3 primary schools started the Soccer program. His achievements in Soccer are equal to those in the entertainment field. He played 13 years of Soccer. Before his 5566 debut in 2002, every Soccer match in Taiwan both big and small, featured Wang Shao Wei on its players list. On June 26, 2002, Shao Wei became the Soccer coach for one of the community activities Soccer teams. Shao Wei showed some kung fu soccer steps. As an artist, he helped improve the positive reputation of Taiwanese Soccer. His managing company (Jungiery) worked with him to help balance his soccer and entertainment activities.

In 2004, Shao Wei released a book called 明星入門100招 (100 Ways To Become A Star).

In December 2007, Wang Shao Wei promoted 5566's album, Bravo, in Singapore.

On November 18, 2007, fans helped him celebrate his 31st birthday, and unexpectedly gave him a 2 million dollar Lexus Alphard as a birthday present. Wang Shao Wei turned down this gift, but took a picture of it as a remembrance.

(It is reported that many Wang Shao Wei fans coming from wealthy family backgrounds. An American fan once flew from the US to Indonesia when Shao Wei participated an activity there, and gave him round trip airplane tickets to Hawaii.)

In March 2008 he changed his name from 王绍偉 to 王少偉 (the reading is still the same).

In 2008, Shao wei launched his first bakery shop, named Uncle Sam. The breads from his shop are imported from US. Besides selling bread, he also sells merchandise such as T-shirts, soft toys of characters designed by him. The same year he appeared in the movie Drifting Flowers.

In 2009, he launched his second shop- Uncle Sam's Junior, a branch of Uncle Sam's Bakery Cafe.

== Filmography ==
=== Television series ===
Year	Title	Role
2014	不能沒有妳 / Can't Be Without You	Yong Zhenqi / 楊震祺
2011	They Are Flying	
2011	牽手 / Wives	Jiang Hao / 江皓
2009	魔女18號 / Magic 18	Zhu Yao Wu / 朱耀武
2009	美味赌王 /	
2008	欢喜来逗阵 / Your Home is My Home	Shi Mai Ke / 石麦克 / Michael
2007	惡女阿楚 / Mean Girl Ah Chu	Ling Ping Zhi / 凌平之
2006	剪刀石頭布 / A Game About Love	Wei Qi Xiang / 韋祺祥
2006	愛情魔髮師 / The Magicians of Love	Lin Er Qi / 林爾奇/ Richie
2005	王子變青蛙 / The Prince Who Turns into a Frog	Xu Zi Qian / 徐子騫
2005	格鬥天王 / Mr Fighting	(Guest Appearance)
2004	愛上千金美眉 / In Love with a Rich Girl	(Guest Appearance)
2004	紫禁之巅 / Top on the Forbidden City	Fire
2003	千金百分百 / 100% Senorita	(Guest Appearance)
2003	西街少年 / Westside Story	Gu Tian Le / 辜天樂
2002	MVP 情人 / My MVP Valentine	Shao Wei / 紹偉
1998	曾經 / Ceng Jing	Yuen Ming Gan / 袁明剛

=== Films ===
- Eternal Flower (2018)
- My Dad Is a Superstar (2013)
- Delicacy Gambling King (2009)
