= Joyce Chao =

Taiwanese actress, singer, and television host

- Born: 15 November 1979 (age 47); Taipei, Taiwan
- Education: Soochow University
- Occupations: Actress, singer, television host
- Years active: 2003-present
- Spouse: Renzo Liu (m. 2017)
- Musical career
- Genre: Mandopop
- Instrument: Vocals
- Labels: Avex Taiwan (2002-2005); Warner Music Taiwan (2005-2008); JVR Music (2008-present)
- Formerly of: 7 Flowers

Joyce Chao or Chao Hung-chiao (Chinese: 趙虹喬; pinyin: Zhào Hóngqiáo; born 15 November 1979) is a Taiwanese actress, singer and television host. She was a member of Taiwanese female group 7 Flowers.

== Background ==
During years in school, her friends introduced her to a model company. After graduation, she entered Jungiery. She was cast in the film Shanghai Ghetto, a love story between a Jewish refugee and a Chinese woman during World War Two. She played the role of Alice Chen, a friend of the protagonist.

== Personal life ==
In 2017, Chao married actor Renzo Liu in a private wedding in Okinawa.

== Filmography ==
- Westside Story (2003)
- 100% Senorita (2004)
- The Champion (2004)
- The Prince Who Turns into a Frog (2005)
- Smiling Pasta (2006)
- Full Count (2007)
- Your Home is My Home (2008)
- Local Hero (2011)
- Women Flower (2012)
- Untold Stories of 1949 (2013)
- Shanghai Ghetto (上海隔都) (2012)
- Forget You Remember Love (2020)
