= Love or Spend =

2015 Taiwanese television series

- Promotional poster
- 戀愛鄰距離
- Genre: Romance, Comedy, Family
- Created by: Sanlih E-Television
- Written by: Xu Gui Ying (徐珪瑩) (Ep. 1-2); Ou Lai En (歐萊恩) (Ep. 1-51); Yan Yi Fan (顏一帆) ( Ep. 6-77); Wu De Yuan (吳德元) (Ep. 6-77); Zheng Ying Min (鄭英敏) (Screenwriter Ep. 6-51, Ep. 52-77); Cao Yi He (曹頤和) Ep. 31-77)
- Directed by: Eri Hao
- Starring: Kingone Wang; Ling Hung; Jolin Chien; Dayuan Lin; Li Jing Tian (李京恬)
- Opening theme: Can't Lose You Now (保護你) by Patrick Brasca
- Ending theme: Don't Say Goodbye (我不要) by Popu Lady
- Country of origin: Republic of China (Taiwan)
- Original language: Mandarin
- No. of seasons: 1
- No. of episodes: 77 + 2 specials

Production
- Executive producers: Liu Qiu Ping (劉秋平); Xu Shi Qi (徐詩淇)
- Producers: Liang Han Hui (梁漢輝); Xu Zhi Yi (徐志怡)
- Production location: Taiwan
- Camera setup: Multi camera
- Running time: 60 minutes
- Production companies: Sanlih E-Television; Eastern Shine Production Co., Ltd.

Original release
- Network: SETTV
- Release: 4 November 2015 – 23 March 2016

Related
- Bitter Sweet; The Love Song

Love or Spend (Chinese: 戀愛鄰距離; pinyin: liàn'ài lín jù lí; literally "Love the Neighbor Distance") is a 2015 Taiwanese television series starring Kingone Wang, Ling Hung, Jolin Chien, Dayuan Lin and Li Jing Tian. Filming began on October 23, 2015, and wrapped up on February 22, 2016. It premiered on November 4, 2015, on SETTV, airing weekdays at 8:00 pm.

== Synopsis ==
Pei Zheng Xi (Kingone Wang) and Mo Cheng Zhen (Jennifer Hong) have been close friends since childhood. Their mothers are best friends and have always hoped that their kids would fall in love and marry each other, but the two share no romantic feelings. Ultimately, their mothers convince them to explore their individual love lives and find their soul mates by their 32nd birthdays. If they fail to find their matches, they have to marry each other.

== Cast ==
=== Main ===
- Kingone Wang as Pei Zheng Xi 裴正希
- Ling Hung as Mo Cheng Zhen 莫洆湞
- Jolin Chien as Mo Cheng Han 莫丞翰
- Dayuan Lin as Pei You Ting 裴又婷
- Li Jing Tian (李京恬) as Pei You Xin 裴又欣

=== Supporting ===
- David Chiu as Xu Wei Ming 徐維銘（Victor）
- Lawrence Liu as He Li Yang 何立揚
- Fu Lei (傅雷) as Pei Yong Jin 裴勇進
- Tan Ai-chen as Chen Cai Ling 陳采靈
- Elten Ting as Huang Ji Xia 黃季霞
- Chen Bor-jeng as Xu Zhi Hui 徐志輝（Stanley）
- Lin Xiu Jun (林秀君) as Gong Pei Rong 鞏佩蓉（Wendy）
- Deyn Li as Wu Ren Yan 吳仁彥
- Christina Mok as Lu Wei Xuan 陸蔚萱
- Hsieh Chi-wen as Zheng Jia Zheng 鄭嘉政
- Yang Chieh-mei as Chen Yu Hua 陳郁華
- Vince Kao as Hong Xing Yuan 洪行遠
- Yan Yi Ping (顏怡平) as Yan Man Man 顏蔓蔓
- Bebe Chang as Qian Xiao Wei 錢曉薇
- Lin Jia Wei (林家磑) as Gao Yi Dian 高一點
- Yang Li-yin as Xu Hua Hua 許花花
- Zhang Yu Ci (張淯詞) as Feng Xia Sheng 馮夏生
- Esther Huang as Hong Qian Hui 洪千慧 (Vivian)

=== Guest ===
- Amanda Liu as Bei Bei 蓓蓓
- Joanne Tseng as Li Yi Wan 黎一彎
- Melvin Sia as Du Xiao Fei 杜曉飛
- Lin Zhi Hao (林志豪) as Ye Dong 葉董
- Lucas Luo as child Zheng Xi

== Soundtrack ==
Title (English)	Title (Chinese)	Performer (Chinese name in parentheses)
"Can't Lose You Now"	保護你	Patrick Brasca (派偉俊)
"Don't Say Goodbye"	我不要	Popu Lady
"Love Addiction"	信愛成癮	Ella Chen
"Age of 30"	30啊	Ella Chen
"The Nearness of Distance"	親密的疏離	Celeste Syn (冼佩瑾)
"Jessika"		Celeste Syn (冼佩瑾)
"Throw You in the River"	把你丟進淡水河裡	Celeste Syn (冼佩瑾)
"My Time"	我的時代	Patrick Brasca (派偉俊)
"I Like You"	我喜歡你	Patrick Brasca (派偉俊)
"Wooden Man"	木頭人	Aaron Yan
"Love Against the Flow"	逆流愛情	Power Station
"Rainbows"		Andrew Yeh (葉懷佩)

== Broadcast ==
Network	Country	Airing Date	Timeslot
SETTV	Taiwan	November 4, 2015	Monday to Friday 8:00-9:00 pm
ETTV	Taiwan	November 4, 2015	Monday to Friday 9:00-10:00 pm
Astro Shuang Xing	Malaysia	November 5, 2015	Monday to Friday 6:00-7:00 pm
VV Drama	Singapore	December 7, 2015	Monday to Friday 7:00-8:00 pm

== Reception ==
=== Viewership ===
Air Date	Episodes	Weekly Average Ratings	Rank
Nov 4–6, 2015	1–3	1.55	4
Nov 9–13, 2015	4–8	1.33	4
Nov 16–20, 2015	9–13	1.41	3
Nov 23–27, 2015	14–18	1.40	3
Nov 30–Dec 4, 2015	19–23	1.27	4
Dec 7–11, 2015	24–28	1.42	3
Dec 14–18, 2015	29–33	1.54	3
Dec 21–25, 2015	34–38	1.66	3
Dec 28, 2015 – Jan 1, 2016^{1}	39–42	1.53	3
Jan 4–8, 2016	43–47	1.72	3
Jan 11–15, 2016	48–52	1.53	3
Jan 18–22, 2016	53–57	1.52	3
Jan 25–29, 2016	58–62	1.72	3
Feb 1–5, 2016	63–67	1.80	3
Feb 8–12, 2016	Special Ep 1–2	1.25	3
Feb 8–12, 2016	68–70	1.25	3
Feb 15–19, 2016	71–75	1.75	3
Feb 22–23, 2016	76–77	1.73	3
Average ratings		1.54	–

^Note 1: No episode was aired on December 31, 2015 due to SETTV airing New Year's Eve countdown special show.

=== Awards and nominations ===
Ceremony	Category	Nominee	Result
2015 Sanlih Drama Awards	Best Actor Award	Kingone Wang	Nominated
2015 Sanlih Drama Awards	Best Actress Award	Ling Hung	Nominated
2015 Sanlih Drama Awards	Best Potential Award	Dayuan Lin	Nominated
2015 Sanlih Drama Awards	China Wave Award	Kingone Wang	Won
2015 Sanlih Drama Awards	Viewers Choice Drama Award	Love or Spend	Nominated
