= Sanlih Drama Awards =

Annual award for SETTV drama television

Sanlih Drama Awards 華劇大賞
- Sanlih Drama Awards logo
- Country: Taiwan
- Presented by: SETTV
- Reward: SETTV Award
- First award: 12 December 2012
- Final award: 10 December 2016
- Website: www.setn.com/event/2015spop/default.aspx#fans

Television/radio coverage
- Network: SETTV

The Sanlih Drama Awards (Chinese: 華劇大賞; pinyin: Huájù Dàshǎng) was an annual awards ceremony that celebrated the best in SETTV drama programming. The awards were created in 2011 to help promote, celebrate and award Sanlih E-Television dramas that aired in the year. The first ceremony was held on 12 December 2012 and was originally called the "Thanks Party" (三立華劇感恩派對). No nomination list was released for the 2012 awards. Winners were announced during the ceremony. The ceremony was held each year in December at SETTV headquarters in Neihu District, Taipei. The last awards ceremony was held in 2016.

== Voting ==
In 2013 the awards became more establish with a nomination list and voting system. The awards are given based on:

- 30% - Weibo web voting (only registered Weibo users can vote in all categories once per day)
- 30% - media voting
- 40% - professionals voting

== Categories ==
Originally 12 awards were presented in 2012. In 2013 a total of 12 awards were awarded, the green leaf and media award were removed. Also the China wave and best drama awards were added. In 2014 a total of 10 awards will be awarded, with the child actor and overseas award removed.

=== Current categories ===
- Viewers Choice Drama Award (2013- ) - Awarded to the most popular drama of the year with the lead actor and lead actress as recipients.
- Best Actor Award (2012- ) - Awarded to the most outstanding leading actor in a drama.
- Best Actress Award (2012- ) - Awarded to the most outstanding leading actress in a drama.
- Best Screen Couple Award (2012- ) - Awarded to the male and female lead with the best on screen chemistry in a drama.
- China Wave Award (2012- ) - An honorary award where the recipient is chosen by Sanlih executives. Awarded to an actor (male or female) for spreading Taiwanese entertainment outside of Taiwan. In 2014, the award was made a regular category award with a nomination list where Weibo users could vote. The award was reverted to an honorary award in 2015.
- Best Kiss Award (2012- ) - Awarded to the male and female lead with the best kissing scene in a drama.
- Best Crying Award (2012- ) - Awarded to an actor or actress with the best crying scenes in a drama.
- Best Powerful Performance Award (2015- ) - Integration of the "Best Lady Killer Award" and "Best Foolishly Award".
- Best Potential Award (2015- ) - Awarded to a semi new artiste.
- Viewers Choice Drama Theme Song Award (2016- ) - Voted by viewers and awarded to the most popular drama theme song of the year.
- VIDOL TV Best Drama Award (2016- ) - Awarded to the most popular drama webstream on http://vidol.tv/.

=== Discontinued categories ===
- Media Choice Award (2012) - awarded to an actor or actress by media voting.
- Best Child Actor Award (2013) - awarded to a child actor in a drama.
- Most Popular Overseas Award (2012-2013) - awarded to an actor (male or female) based on Weibo and media voting outside of Taiwan.
- Best Lady Killer Award (2012-2014) - awarded to an actor who plays a father figure in a drama.
- Best Foolishly Award (2012-2014) - awarded to an actress who plays a mother figure in a drama.
- Weibo Popularity Award (2013-2014) - awarded to an actor (male or female) based on 100% voting by Weibo users.
- Best Green Leaf Award (2012, 2015) - Awarded to a supporting actor or actress in a drama.
- Best Selling S-Pop Magazine Award (2015) - Non-voting award, awarded to an artiste on the cover of the years best selling issue of Sanlih's self-published magazine "S-Pop".

== Hosts ==
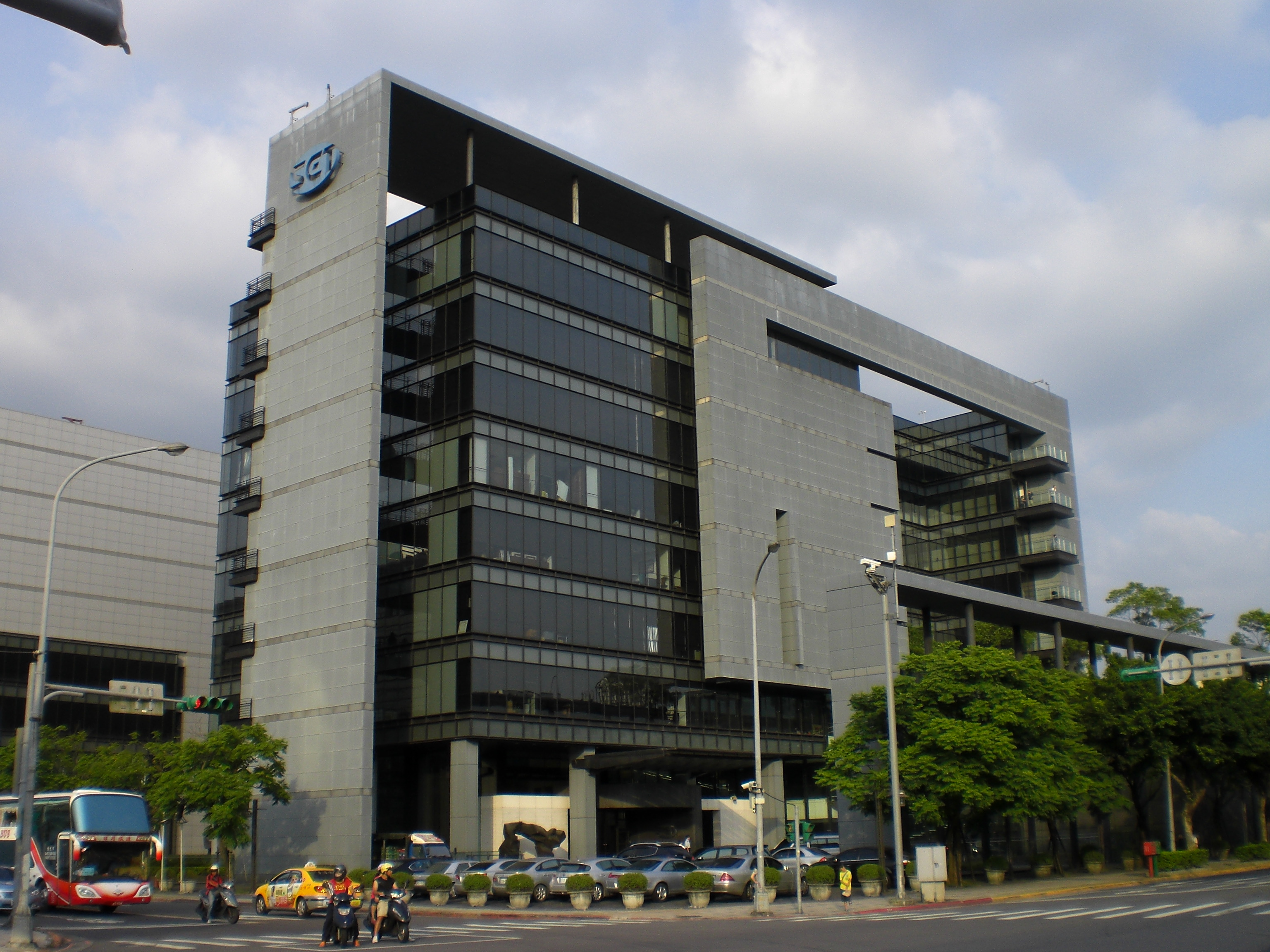
SETTV building in Neihu, Taipei where the award ceremony is held

Year	Host(s)	Event date
2012	Hsueh Shih-ling; Harry Chang; Phoebe Yuan	12 December 2012
2013	Hsueh Shih-ling; Lulu Huang	28 December 2013
2014	George Chang	14 December 2014
2015	Aaron Yan; Lulu Huang	12 December 2015
2016	Hsueh Shih-ling; Lulu Huang	10 December 2016

== Awards list ==
- Winners are highlighted and **boldfaced**, except for 2012 due to no nomination list.

=== 2012 ===
:The "2012 Sanlih Drama Awards" was held on 12 December 2012 and broadcast on SETTV channel. The ceremony was named the "Thanks Party". No nomination list was released. The first ceremony was not broadcast.

Year	Ceremony	Category	Drama	Nominee
2012	2012 Thanks Party 三立華劇感恩派對	Best Actor Award (Presenter: KunDa Hsieh & Nana Lee)	Miss Rose	Roy Chiu
2012	2012 Thanks Party 三立華劇感恩派對	Best Actress Award (Presenter: Jimmy Lin)	Inborn Pair / Love, Now	Annie Chen
2012	2012 Thanks Party 三立華劇感恩派對	Best Screen Couple Award (Presenter: Nicholas Teo & Reen Yu)	Inborn Pair	Chris Wang & Annie Chen
2012	2012 Thanks Party 三立華劇感恩派對	Best Kiss Award (Presenter: James Wen & Nikki Hsieh)	Love, Now	George Hu & Annie Chen
2012	2012 Thanks Party 三立華劇感恩派對	Best Crying Award (Presenter: Jian Chang & Lucas Luo)	Sweet Sweet Bodyguard	Lee Lee-zen
2012	2012 Thanks Party 三立華劇感恩派對	Best Lady Killer Award (Presenter: Janel Tsai)	Inborn Pair / Sweet Sweet Bodyguard	Chen Bor-jeng
2012	2012 Thanks Party 三立華劇感恩派對	Best Foolishly Award (Presenter: Fu Lei & Shen Meng Sheng)	Inborn Pair / Sweet Sweet Bodyguard	Tan Ai-chen
2012	2012 Thanks Party 三立華劇感恩派對	Best Green Leaf Award (Presenter: Vanness Wu & Joanne Tseng)	Ti Amo Chocolate	Chung Hsin-Ling
2012	2012 Thanks Party 三立華劇感恩派對	China Wave Award (Presenter: )	Gung Hay Fat Choy	James Wen
2012	2012 Thanks Party 三立華劇感恩派對	Most Popular Overseas Award (Presenter: Peng Qia Qia)	Ti Amo Chocolate	Vanness Wu
2012	2012 Thanks Party 三立華劇感恩派對	Media Choice Award (Presenter: Ann Hsu)	Inborn Pair	Chris Wang

=== 2013 ===
The "2013 Sanlih Drama Awards" was held on 28 December 2013 and broadcast on SETTV channel. The ceremony was originally scheduled for 21 December 2013 but was pushed back to allow Weibo users additional voting time. "Best Child Actor Award" and "Viewers Choice Drama Award" was added to the category list. The "China Wave Award" was turned into an honorary award with no nomination list.

Year	Ceremony	Category	Drama	Nominee
2013	2013 Sanlih Drama Awards 華劇大賞	Viewers Choice Drama Award (Presenter: Lin Yo-Wei & LeLe)	A Hint of You	Micheal Zhang & Nana Lee
2013	2013 Sanlih Drama Awards 華劇大賞	Viewers Choice Drama Award (Presenter: Lin Yo-Wei & LeLe)	Two Fathers	Lin Yo-Wei & Megan Lai
2013	2013 Sanlih Drama Awards 華劇大賞	Viewers Choice Drama Award (Presenter: Lin Yo-Wei & LeLe)	Love Around	George Hu & Annie Chen
2013	2013 Sanlih Drama Awards 華劇大賞	Viewers Choice Drama Award (Presenter: Lin Yo-Wei & LeLe)	Just You	Aaron Yan & Puff Kuo
2013	2013 Sanlih Drama Awards 華劇大賞	Viewers Choice Drama Award (Presenter: Lin Yo-Wei & LeLe)	Love Family	Chris Wang & Serena Fang
2013	2013 Sanlih Drama Awards 華劇大賞	Viewers Choice Drama Award (Presenter: Lin Yo-Wei & LeLe)	Deja Vu	Yao Yuan Hao & Mandy Wei
2013	2013 Sanlih Drama Awards 華劇大賞	Best Actor Award (Presenter: Roy Chiu & Lee Lee-zen)	A Hint of You	Micheal Zhang
2013	2013 Sanlih Drama Awards 華劇大賞	Best Actor Award (Presenter: Roy Chiu & Lee Lee-zen)	Two Fathers	Lin Yo-Wei
2013	2013 Sanlih Drama Awards 華劇大賞	Best Actor Award (Presenter: Roy Chiu & Lee Lee-zen)	Love Around	George Hu
2013	2013 Sanlih Drama Awards 華劇大賞	Best Actor Award (Presenter: Roy Chiu & Lee Lee-zen)	Just You	Aaron Yan
2013	2013 Sanlih Drama Awards 華劇大賞	Best Actor Award (Presenter: Roy Chiu & Lee Lee-zen)	Love Family	Chris Wang
2013	2013 Sanlih Drama Awards 華劇大賞	Best Actor Award (Presenter: Roy Chiu & Lee Lee-zen)	Deja Vu	Yao Yuan Hao
2013	2013 Sanlih Drama Awards 華劇大賞	Best Actress Award (Presenter: Roy Chiu & Lee Lee-zen)	A Hint of You	Nana Lee
2013	2013 Sanlih Drama Awards 華劇大賞	Best Actress Award (Presenter: Roy Chiu & Lee Lee-zen)	Two Fathers	Megan Lai
2013	2013 Sanlih Drama Awards 華劇大賞	Best Actress Award (Presenter: Roy Chiu & Lee Lee-zen)	Love Around	Annie Chen
2013	2013 Sanlih Drama Awards 華劇大賞	Best Actress Award (Presenter: Roy Chiu & Lee Lee-zen)	Just You	Puff Kuo
2013	2013 Sanlih Drama Awards 華劇大賞	Best Actress Award (Presenter: Roy Chiu & Lee Lee-zen)	Second Life	Cyndi Wang
2013	2013 Sanlih Drama Awards 華劇大賞	Best Actress Award (Presenter: Roy Chiu & Lee Lee-zen)	Deja Vu	Mandy Wei
2013	2013 Sanlih Drama Awards 華劇大賞	Best Screen Couple Award (Presenter: Yao Yuan Hao & Mandy Wei)	A Hint of You	Micheal Zhang & Nana Lee
2013	2013 Sanlih Drama Awards 華劇大賞	Best Screen Couple Award (Presenter: Yao Yuan Hao & Mandy Wei)	Love Around	George Hu & Annie Chen
2013	2013 Sanlih Drama Awards 華劇大賞	Best Screen Couple Award (Presenter: Yao Yuan Hao & Mandy Wei)	Just You	Aaron Yan & Puff Kuo
2013	2013 Sanlih Drama Awards 華劇大賞	Best Screen Couple Award (Presenter: Yao Yuan Hao & Mandy Wei)	Second Life	KunDa Hsieh & Cyndi Wang
2013	2013 Sanlih Drama Awards 華劇大賞	Best Screen Couple Award (Presenter: Yao Yuan Hao & Mandy Wei)	Love Family	Chris Wang & Serena Fang
2013	2013 Sanlih Drama Awards 華劇大賞	Best Screen Couple Award (Presenter: Yao Yuan Hao & Mandy Wei)	Deja Vu	Yao Yuan Hao & Mandy Wei
2013	2013 Sanlih Drama Awards 華劇大賞	Best Kiss Award (Presenter: Lego Lee & Lorene Ren)	A Hint of You	Micheal Zhang & Nana Lee
2013	2013 Sanlih Drama Awards 華劇大賞	Best Kiss Award (Presenter: Lego Lee & Lorene Ren)	Two Fathers	Lin Yo-Wei & Megan Lai
2013	2013 Sanlih Drama Awards 華劇大賞	Best Kiss Award (Presenter: Lego Lee & Lorene Ren)	Love Around	George Hu & Annie Chen
2013	2013 Sanlih Drama Awards 華劇大賞	Best Kiss Award (Presenter: Lego Lee & Lorene Ren)	Just You	Aaron Yan & Puff Kuo
2013	2013 Sanlih Drama Awards 華劇大賞	Best Kiss Award (Presenter: Lego Lee & Lorene Ren)	Second Life	KunDa Hsieh & Cyndi Wang
2013	2013 Sanlih Drama Awards 華劇大賞	Best Kiss Award (Presenter: Lego Lee & Lorene Ren)	Deja Vu	Yao Yuan Hao & Mandy Wei
2013	2013 Sanlih Drama Awards 華劇大賞	Best Crying Award (Presenter: Lung Shao-Hua & Ye Tian-lun)	Two Fathers	Lin Yo-Wei & LeLe
2013	2013 Sanlih Drama Awards 華劇大賞	Best Crying Award (Presenter: Lung Shao-Hua & Ye Tian-lun)	Love Around	George Hu & Annie Chen
2013	2013 Sanlih Drama Awards 華劇大賞	Best Crying Award (Presenter: Lung Shao-Hua & Ye Tian-lun)	Just You	Aaron Yan & Puff Kuo
2013	2013 Sanlih Drama Awards 華劇大賞	Best Crying Award (Presenter: Lung Shao-Hua & Ye Tian-lun)	Second Life	KunDa Hsieh & Cyndi Wang
2013	2013 Sanlih Drama Awards 華劇大賞	Best Crying Award (Presenter: Lung Shao-Hua & Ye Tian-lun)	Deja Vu	Yao Yuan Hao & Mandy Wei
2013	2013 Sanlih Drama Awards 華劇大賞	Best Lady Killer Award (Presenter: Wang Shu-juan & Guo Shu Yao)	Two Fathers	Chang Kuo-Chu
2013	2013 Sanlih Drama Awards 華劇大賞	Best Lady Killer Award (Presenter: Wang Shu-juan & Guo Shu Yao)	Love Around	Jian Chang
2013	2013 Sanlih Drama Awards 華劇大賞	Best Lady Killer Award (Presenter: Wang Shu-juan & Guo Shu Yao)	Just You	Shen Meng-Sheng
2013	2013 Sanlih Drama Awards 華劇大賞	Best Lady Killer Award (Presenter: Wang Shu-juan & Guo Shu Yao)	Second Life	Fu Lei
2013	2013 Sanlih Drama Awards 華劇大賞	Best Lady Killer Award (Presenter: Wang Shu-juan & Guo Shu Yao)	Second Life	David Ai Wei
2013	2013 Sanlih Drama Awards 華劇大賞	Best Foolishly Award (Presenter: Wang Shu-juan & Guo Shu Yao)	A Hint of You	Ke Shu-qin
2013	2013 Sanlih Drama Awards 華劇大賞	Best Foolishly Award (Presenter: Wang Shu-juan & Guo Shu Yao)	A Hint Of You	Fang Wen-lin
2013	2013 Sanlih Drama Awards 華劇大賞	Best Foolishly Award (Presenter: Wang Shu-juan & Guo Shu Yao)	Love Around	Wang Chuan
2013	2013 Sanlih Drama Awards 華劇大賞	Best Foolishly Award (Presenter: Wang Shu-juan & Guo Shu Yao)	Just You	Yang Li-Yin
2013	2013 Sanlih Drama Awards 華劇大賞	Best Foolishly Award (Presenter: Wang Shu-juan & Guo Shu Yao)	Second Life	Li Zhi Qin
2013	2013 Sanlih Drama Awards 華劇大賞	Best Child Actor Award (Presenter: Zhang Ting Yi, Que Xiao You, LeLe)	Lady Maid Maid	Aiko Lan
2013	2013 Sanlih Drama Awards 華劇大賞	Best Child Actor Award (Presenter: Zhang Ting Yi, Que Xiao You, LeLe)	Two Fathers	LeLe
2013	2013 Sanlih Drama Awards 華劇大賞	Best Child Actor Award (Presenter: Zhang Ting Yi, Que Xiao You, LeLe)	Two Fathers	Que Xiao You
2013	2013 Sanlih Drama Awards 華劇大賞	Best Child Actor Award (Presenter: Zhang Ting Yi, Que Xiao You, LeLe)	Two Fathers	Zhang Ting Yi
2013	2013 Sanlih Drama Awards 華劇大賞	Best Child Actor Award (Presenter: Zhang Ting Yi, Que Xiao You, LeLe)	Love Family	Eason Zhao
2013	2013 Sanlih Drama Awards 華劇大賞	Most Popular Overseas Award (Presenter: James Wen)	Two Fathers	Lin Yo-Wei
2013	2013 Sanlih Drama Awards 華劇大賞	Most Popular Overseas Award (Presenter: James Wen)	Love Around	George Hu
2013	2013 Sanlih Drama Awards 華劇大賞	Most Popular Overseas Award (Presenter: James Wen)	Love Around	Annie Chen
2013	2013 Sanlih Drama Awards 華劇大賞	Most Popular Overseas Award (Presenter: James Wen)	Just You	Aaron Yan
2013	2013 Sanlih Drama Awards 華劇大賞	Most Popular Overseas Award (Presenter: James Wen)	Just You	Puff Kuo
2013	2013 Sanlih Drama Awards 華劇大賞	Most Popular Overseas Award (Presenter: James Wen)	Second Life	Cyndi Wang
2013	2013 Sanlih Drama Awards 華劇大賞	Most Popular Overseas Award (Presenter: James Wen)	Love Family	Chris Wang
2013	2013 Sanlih Drama Awards 華劇大賞	Most Popular Overseas Award (Presenter: James Wen)	Deja Vu	Yao Yuan Hao
2013	2013 Sanlih Drama Awards 華劇大賞	Weibo Popularity Award (Presenter: Jacky Wu & Blackie Chen)	Two Fathers	Lin Yo-Wei
2013	2013 Sanlih Drama Awards 華劇大賞	Weibo Popularity Award (Presenter: Jacky Wu & Blackie Chen)	Love Around	George Hu
2013	2013 Sanlih Drama Awards 華劇大賞	Weibo Popularity Award (Presenter: Jacky Wu & Blackie Chen)	Love Around	Annie Chen
2013	2013 Sanlih Drama Awards 華劇大賞	Weibo Popularity Award (Presenter: Jacky Wu & Blackie Chen)	Just You	Aaron Yan
2013	2013 Sanlih Drama Awards 華劇大賞	Weibo Popularity Award (Presenter: Jacky Wu & Blackie Chen)	Just You	Puff Kuo
2013	2013 Sanlih Drama Awards 華劇大賞	Weibo Popularity Award (Presenter: Jacky Wu & Blackie Chen)	Second Life	Cyndi Wang
2013	2013 Sanlih Drama Awards 華劇大賞	Weibo Popularity Award (Presenter: Jacky Wu & Blackie Chen)	Love Family	Chris Wang
2013	2013 Sanlih Drama Awards 華劇大賞	Weibo Popularity Award (Presenter: Jacky Wu & Blackie Chen)	Deja Vu	Yao Yuan Hao
2013	2013 Sanlih Drama Awards 華劇大賞	China Wave Award (Presenter: Jacky Wu & Blackie Chen)	Love Family	Chris Wang

=== 2014 ===
The "2014 Sanlih Drama Awards" was originally scheduled to be held on 20 December 2014 but was later moved up to 14 December 2014 and broadcast on SETTV channel. The award ceremony was pre-recorded earlier in the afternoon to be aired on the same evening at 10:00 pm. In 2014 the "Best Child Actor Award" and "Best Overseas Award" category was removed. Also the "China Wave Award" which was an honorary award in the past was turned into a regular award with a nomination list where Weibo users had the opportunity to vote on an recipient.

Year	Ceremony	Category	Drama	Nominee
2014	2014 Sanlih Drama Awards 華劇大賞	Viewers Choice Drama Award (Presenter: Lego Lee, Lorene Ren, Guo Shu Yao)	Fabulous 30	Hans Chang & Ling Hung
2014	2014 Sanlih Drama Awards 華劇大賞	Viewers Choice Drama Award (Presenter: Lego Lee, Lorene Ren, Guo Shu Yao)	In a Good Way	Lego Lee & Lorene Ren
2014	2014 Sanlih Drama Awards 華劇大賞	Viewers Choice Drama Award (Presenter: Lego Lee, Lorene Ren, Guo Shu Yao)	Fall In Love With Me	Aaron Yan & Tia Lee
2014	2014 Sanlih Drama Awards 華劇大賞	Viewers Choice Drama Award (Presenter: Lego Lee, Lorene Ren, Guo Shu Yao)	Tie The Knot	Nylon Chen & Cheryl Yang
2014	2014 Sanlih Drama Awards 華劇大賞	Viewers Choice Drama Award (Presenter: Lego Lee, Lorene Ren, Guo Shu Yao)	Pleasantly Surprised	Jasper Liu & Puff Kuo
2014	2014 Sanlih Drama Awards 華劇大賞	Viewers Choice Drama Award (Presenter: Lego Lee, Lorene Ren, Guo Shu Yao)	Say Again Yes I Do	Lin Yo-Wei & Mandy Wei
2014	2014 Sanlih Drama Awards 華劇大賞	Viewers Choice Drama Award (Presenter: Lego Lee, Lorene Ren, Guo Shu Yao)	Love Cheque Charge	George Hu & Phoebe Yuan
2014	2014 Sanlih Drama Awards 華劇大賞	Viewers Choice Drama Award (Presenter: Lego Lee, Lorene Ren, Guo Shu Yao)	Aim High	Chris Wang & Summer Meng
2014	2014 Sanlih Drama Awards 華劇大賞	Best Actor Award (Presenter: Lin Yo-Wei & Mandy Wei)	Fabulous 30	Danson Tang
2014	2014 Sanlih Drama Awards 華劇大賞	Best Actor Award (Presenter: Lin Yo-Wei & Mandy Wei)	Fabulous 30	Darren Qiu
2014	2014 Sanlih Drama Awards 華劇大賞	Best Actor Award (Presenter: Lin Yo-Wei & Mandy Wei)	In a Good Way	Jay Shih
2014	2014 Sanlih Drama Awards 華劇大賞	Best Actor Award (Presenter: Lin Yo-Wei & Mandy Wei)	In a Good Way	Lego Lee
2014	2014 Sanlih Drama Awards 華劇大賞	Best Actor Award (Presenter: Lin Yo-Wei & Mandy Wei)	Fall In Love With Me	Aaron Yan
2014	2014 Sanlih Drama Awards 華劇大賞	Best Actor Award (Presenter: Lin Yo-Wei & Mandy Wei)	Pleasantly Surprised	Jasper Liu
2014	2014 Sanlih Drama Awards 華劇大賞	Best Actor Award (Presenter: Lin Yo-Wei & Mandy Wei)	Aim High	Chris Wang
2014	2014 Sanlih Drama Awards 華劇大賞	Best Actor Award (Presenter: Lin Yo-Wei & Mandy Wei)	Aim High	Lego Lee
2014	2014 Sanlih Drama Awards 華劇大賞	Best Actor Award (Presenter: Lin Yo-Wei & Mandy Wei)	Love Cheque Charge	George Hu
2014	2014 Sanlih Drama Awards 華劇大賞	Best Actor Award (Presenter: Lin Yo-Wei & Mandy Wei)	Say Again Yes I Do	Lin Yo-Wei
2014	2014 Sanlih Drama Awards 華劇大賞	Best Actress Award (Presenter: Wu Kang-Hwa)	Fabulous 30	Vivi Lee
2014	2014 Sanlih Drama Awards 華劇大賞	Best Actress Award (Presenter: Wu Kang-Hwa)	Fabulous 30	Ling Hung
2014	2014 Sanlih Drama Awards 華劇大賞	Best Actress Award (Presenter: Wu Kang-Hwa)	Tie The Knot	Cheryl Yang
2014	2014 Sanlih Drama Awards 華劇大賞	Best Actress Award (Presenter: Wu Kang-Hwa)	In a Good Way	Lorene Ren
2014	2014 Sanlih Drama Awards 華劇大賞	Best Actress Award (Presenter: Wu Kang-Hwa)	Aim High	Summer Meng
2014	2014 Sanlih Drama Awards 華劇大賞	Best Actress Award (Presenter: Wu Kang-Hwa)	Aim High	Guo Shu Yao
2014	2014 Sanlih Drama Awards 華劇大賞	Best Actress Award (Presenter: Wu Kang-Hwa)	Love Cheque Charge	Phoebe Yuan
2014	2014 Sanlih Drama Awards 華劇大賞	Best Actress Award (Presenter: Wu Kang-Hwa)	Fall In Love With Me	Tia Lee
2014	2014 Sanlih Drama Awards 華劇大賞	Best Actress Award (Presenter: Wu Kang-Hwa)	Pleasantly Surprised	Puff Kuo
2014	2014 Sanlih Drama Awards 華劇大賞	Best Actress Award (Presenter: Wu Kang-Hwa)	Say Again Yes I Do	Mandy Wei
2014	2014 Sanlih Drama Awards 華劇大賞	Best Screen Couple Award (Presenter: Sunny Li & Carolyn Chen)	Fabulous 30	Danson Tang & Albee Huang
2014	2014 Sanlih Drama Awards 華劇大賞	Best Screen Couple Award (Presenter: Sunny Li & Carolyn Chen)	Pleasantly Surprised	Jasper Liu & Puff Kuo
2014	2014 Sanlih Drama Awards 華劇大賞	Best Screen Couple Award (Presenter: Sunny Li & Carolyn Chen)	In a Good Way	Lego Lee & Lorene Ren
2014	2014 Sanlih Drama Awards 華劇大賞	Best Screen Couple Award (Presenter: Sunny Li & Carolyn Chen)	Fall In Love With Me	Aaron Yan & Tia Lee
2014	2014 Sanlih Drama Awards 華劇大賞	Best Screen Couple Award (Presenter: Sunny Li & Carolyn Chen)	Aim High	Lego Lee & Guo Shu Yao
2014	2014 Sanlih Drama Awards 華劇大賞	Best Kiss Award (Presenter: Aaron Yan & Tia Lee)	Fabulous 30	Danson Tang & Albee Huang
2014	2014 Sanlih Drama Awards 華劇大賞	Best Kiss Award (Presenter: Aaron Yan & Tia Lee)	Pleasantly Surprised	Jasper Liu & Puff Kuo
2014	2014 Sanlih Drama Awards 華劇大賞	Best Kiss Award (Presenter: Aaron Yan & Tia Lee)	Fall In Love With Me	Aaron Yan & Tia Lee
2014	2014 Sanlih Drama Awards 華劇大賞	Best Kiss Award (Presenter: Aaron Yan & Tia Lee)	In a Good Way	Lego Lee & Lorene Ren
2014	2014 Sanlih Drama Awards 華劇大賞	Best Kiss Award (Presenter: Aaron Yan & Tia Lee)	Say Again Yes I Do	Lin Yo-Wei & Mandy Wei
2014	2014 Sanlih Drama Awards 華劇大賞	Best Crying Award (Presenter: Jasper Liu & Puff Kuo)	Fabulous 30	Hans Chang & Jennifer Hong
2014	2014 Sanlih Drama Awards 華劇大賞	Best Crying Award (Presenter: Jasper Liu & Puff Kuo)	In a Good Way	Lego Lee & Lorene Ren
2014	2014 Sanlih Drama Awards 華劇大賞	Best Crying Award (Presenter: Jasper Liu & Puff Kuo)	Love Cheque Charge	George Hu & Liao Jun
2014	2014 Sanlih Drama Awards 華劇大賞	Best Crying Award (Presenter: Jasper Liu & Puff Kuo)	Pleasantly Surprised	Jasper Liu & Puff Kuo
2014	2014 Sanlih Drama Awards 華劇大賞	Best Crying Award (Presenter: Jasper Liu & Puff Kuo)	Fall In Love With Me	Aaron Yan & Tia Lee
2014	2014 Sanlih Drama Awards 華劇大賞	Best Lady Killer Award (Presenter: Phoebe Yuan & Summer Meng)	Tie The Knot	Zhang Pei-Hua
2014	2014 Sanlih Drama Awards 華劇大賞	Best Lady Killer Award (Presenter: Phoebe Yuan & Summer Meng)	Love Cheque Charge	Jian Chang
2014	2014 Sanlih Drama Awards 華劇大賞	Best Lady Killer Award (Presenter: Phoebe Yuan & Summer Meng)	In a Good Way	Liao Jun
2014	2014 Sanlih Drama Awards 華劇大賞	Best Lady Killer Award (Presenter: Phoebe Yuan & Summer Meng)	Fall In Love With Me	Chen Bor Jeng
2014	2014 Sanlih Drama Awards 華劇大賞	Best Lady Killer Award (Presenter: Phoebe Yuan & Summer Meng)	Fall In Love With Me	Jian Chang
2014	2014 Sanlih Drama Awards 華劇大賞	Best Foolishly Award (Presenter: Xiu Jie-Kai & Ling Hung)	Fabulous 30	Tan Ai Chen
2014	2014 Sanlih Drama Awards 華劇大賞	Best Foolishly Award (Presenter: Xiu Jie-Kai & Ling Hung)	Love Cheque Charge	Grace Ko
2014	2014 Sanlih Drama Awards 華劇大賞	Best Foolishly Award (Presenter: Xiu Jie-Kai & Ling Hung)	Pleasantly Surprised	Hu Pei-Lian
2014	2014 Sanlih Drama Awards 華劇大賞	Best Foolishly Award (Presenter: Xiu Jie-Kai & Ling Hung)	In a Good Way	Ma Shi-Li
2014	2014 Sanlih Drama Awards 華劇大賞	Best Foolishly Award (Presenter: Xiu Jie-Kai & Ling Hung)	Say Again Yes I Do	Yang Li-Yin
2014	2014 Sanlih Drama Awards 華劇大賞	China Wave Award (Presenter: Chris Wang & James Wen)	Fabulous 30	Danson Tang
2014	2014 Sanlih Drama Awards 華劇大賞	China Wave Award (Presenter: Chris Wang & James Wen)	Love Cheque Charge	George Hu
2014	2014 Sanlih Drama Awards 華劇大賞	China Wave Award (Presenter: Chris Wang & James Wen)	Pleasantly Surprised	Jasper Liu
2014	2014 Sanlih Drama Awards 華劇大賞	China Wave Award (Presenter: Chris Wang & James Wen)	Pleasantly Surprised	Puff Kuo
2014	2014 Sanlih Drama Awards 華劇大賞	China Wave Award (Presenter: Chris Wang & James Wen)	Fall In Love With Me	Aaron Yan
2014	2014 Sanlih Drama Awards 華劇大賞	China Wave Award (Presenter: Chris Wang & James Wen)	Fall In Love With Me	Tia Lee
2014	2014 Sanlih Drama Awards 華劇大賞	China Wave Award (Presenter: Chris Wang & James Wen)	Say Again Yes I Do	Lin Yo-Wei
2014	2014 Sanlih Drama Awards 華劇大賞	China Wave Award (Presenter: Chris Wang & James Wen)	Aim High	Lego Lee
2014	2014 Sanlih Drama Awards 華劇大賞	China Wave Award (Presenter: Chris Wang & James Wen)	Aim High	Chris Wang
2014	2014 Sanlih Drama Awards 華劇大賞	China Wave Award (Presenter: Chris Wang & James Wen)	Aim High	Guo Shu Yao
2014	2014 Sanlih Drama Awards 華劇大賞	Weibo Popularity Award (Presenter: Amber Kuo)	Fabulous 30	Danson Tang
2014	2014 Sanlih Drama Awards 華劇大賞	Weibo Popularity Award (Presenter: Amber Kuo)	Love Cheque Charge	George Hu
2014	2014 Sanlih Drama Awards 華劇大賞	Weibo Popularity Award (Presenter: Amber Kuo)	Pleasantly Surprised	Jasper Liu
2014	2014 Sanlih Drama Awards 華劇大賞	Weibo Popularity Award (Presenter: Amber Kuo)	Pleasantly Surprised	Puff Kuo
2014	2014 Sanlih Drama Awards 華劇大賞	Weibo Popularity Award (Presenter: Amber Kuo)	Fall In Love With Me	Aaron Yan
2014	2014 Sanlih Drama Awards 華劇大賞	Weibo Popularity Award (Presenter: Amber Kuo)	Fall In Love With Me	Tia Lee
2014	2014 Sanlih Drama Awards 華劇大賞	Weibo Popularity Award (Presenter: Amber Kuo)	Say Again Yes I Do	Lin Yo-Wei
2014	2014 Sanlih Drama Awards 華劇大賞	Weibo Popularity Award (Presenter: Amber Kuo)	Aim High	Lego Lee
2014	2014 Sanlih Drama Awards 華劇大賞	Weibo Popularity Award (Presenter: Amber Kuo)	Aim High	Chris Wang
2014	2014 Sanlih Drama Awards 華劇大賞	Weibo Popularity Award (Presenter: Amber Kuo)	Aim High	Guo Shu Yao

=== 2015 ===
The "2015 Sanlih Drama Awards" was held on 12 December 2015 and broadcast on SETTV channel at 8:00 pm. A total of 11 awards was awarded. The "Best Green Leaf Award" which was last given out in 2012 was reinstated. New award categories added are "Best Powerful Performance Award", "Best Potential Award" and "Best Selling S-Pop Magazine Award". The "Best Selling S-Pop Magazine Award" was announced during the ceremony. The "China Wave Award" was reverted an honorary award where the recipient was chosen by Sanlih executive. Categories removed from the previous year are "Best Lady Killer Award", "Best Foolishly Award" and "Weibo Popularity Award".

Year	Ceremony	Category	Drama	Nominee
2015	2015 Sanlih Drama Awards 華劇大賞	Viewers Choice Drama Award (Presenter: Aaron Yan & Tia Lee)	Be with You	Bobby Dou & Huang Pei Jia
2015	2015 Sanlih Drama Awards 華劇大賞	Viewers Choice Drama Award (Presenter: Aaron Yan & Tia Lee)	Bitter Sweet	Johnny Kou & Ma Zhi Qin
2015	2015 Sanlih Drama Awards 華劇大賞	Viewers Choice Drama Award (Presenter: Aaron Yan & Tia Lee)	Bromance	Baron Chen & Megan Lai
2015	2015 Sanlih Drama Awards 華劇大賞	Viewers Choice Drama Award (Presenter: Aaron Yan & Tia Lee)	Dear Mom	Melvin Sia & Joanne Tseng
2015	2015 Sanlih Drama Awards 華劇大賞	Viewers Choice Drama Award (Presenter: Aaron Yan & Tia Lee)	Love Cuisine	Lego Lee & Allison Lin
2015	2015 Sanlih Drama Awards 華劇大賞	Viewers Choice Drama Award (Presenter: Aaron Yan & Tia Lee)	Love or Spend	Kingone Wang & Ling Hung
2015	2015 Sanlih Drama Awards 華劇大賞	Viewers Choice Drama Award (Presenter: Aaron Yan & Tia Lee)	Murphy's Law of Love	Danson Tang & Ivelyn Lee
2015	2015 Sanlih Drama Awards 華劇大賞	Viewers Choice Drama Award (Presenter: Aaron Yan & Tia Lee)	Someone Like You	Kingone Wang & Lorene Ren
2015	2015 Sanlih Drama Awards 華劇大賞	Viewers Choice Drama Award (Presenter: Aaron Yan & Tia Lee)	When I See You Again	Jasper Liu & Mandy Wei
2015	2015 Sanlih Drama Awards 華劇大賞	Best Actor Award (Presenter: Guo Shu Yao)	Be with You	Bobby Dou
2015	2015 Sanlih Drama Awards 華劇大賞	Best Actor Award (Presenter: Guo Shu Yao)	Be with You	Nylon Chen
2015	2015 Sanlih Drama Awards 華劇大賞	Best Actor Award (Presenter: Guo Shu Yao)	Bitter Sweet	Johnny Kou
2015	2015 Sanlih Drama Awards 華劇大賞	Best Actor Award (Presenter: Guo Shu Yao)	Bitter Sweet	Ahn Zhe
2015	2015 Sanlih Drama Awards 華劇大賞	Best Actor Award (Presenter: Guo Shu Yao)	Bitter Sweet	Shiou Chieh Kai
2015	2015 Sanlih Drama Awards 華劇大賞	Best Actor Award (Presenter: Guo Shu Yao)	Bromance	Baron Chen
2015	2015 Sanlih Drama Awards 華劇大賞	Best Actor Award (Presenter: Guo Shu Yao)	Dear Mom	Melvin Sia
2015	2015 Sanlih Drama Awards 華劇大賞	Best Actor Award (Presenter: Guo Shu Yao)	Love Cuisine	Lego Lee
2015	2015 Sanlih Drama Awards 華劇大賞	Best Actor Award (Presenter: Guo Shu Yao)	Love or Spend	Kingone Wang
2015	2015 Sanlih Drama Awards 華劇大賞	Best Actor Award (Presenter: Guo Shu Yao)	Murphy's Law of Love	Danson Tang
2015	2015 Sanlih Drama Awards 華劇大賞	Best Actor Award (Presenter: Guo Shu Yao)	Someone Like You	Kingone Wang
2015	2015 Sanlih Drama Awards 華劇大賞	Best Actor Award (Presenter: Guo Shu Yao)	When I See You Again	Jasper Liu
2015	2015 Sanlih Drama Awards 華劇大賞	Best Actress Award (Presenter: Chris Wu)	Be with You	Huang Pei Jia
2015	2015 Sanlih Drama Awards 華劇大賞	Best Actress Award (Presenter: Chris Wu)	Bitter Sweet	Esther Liu
2015	2015 Sanlih Drama Awards 華劇大賞	Best Actress Award (Presenter: Chris Wu)	Bitter Sweet	Tracy Chou
2015	2015 Sanlih Drama Awards 華劇大賞	Best Actress Award (Presenter: Chris Wu)	Bromance	Megan Lai
2015	2015 Sanlih Drama Awards 華劇大賞	Best Actress Award (Presenter: Chris Wu)	Dear Mom	Joanne Tseng
2015	2015 Sanlih Drama Awards 華劇大賞	Best Actress Award (Presenter: Chris Wu)	Dear Mom	Ling Hung
2015	2015 Sanlih Drama Awards 華劇大賞	Best Actress Award (Presenter: Chris Wu)	Love Cuisine	Allison Lin
2015	2015 Sanlih Drama Awards 華劇大賞	Best Actress Award (Presenter: Chris Wu)	Love or Spend	Ling Hung
2015	2015 Sanlih Drama Awards 華劇大賞	Best Actress Award (Presenter: Chris Wu)	Murphy's Law of Love	Ivelyn Lee
2015	2015 Sanlih Drama Awards 華劇大賞	Best Actress Award (Presenter: Chris Wu)	Someone Like You	Lorene Ren
2015	2015 Sanlih Drama Awards 華劇大賞	Best Actress Award (Presenter: Chris Wu)	When I See You Again	Mandy Wei
2015	2015 Sanlih Drama Awards 華劇大賞	Best Screen Couple Award (Presenter: Lego Lee & Allison Lin)	Dear Mom	Melvin Sia & Joanne Tseng
2015	2015 Sanlih Drama Awards 華劇大賞	Best Screen Couple Award (Presenter: Lego Lee & Allison Lin)	Love Cuisine	Lego Lee & Allison Lin
2015	2015 Sanlih Drama Awards 華劇大賞	Best Screen Couple Award (Presenter: Lego Lee & Allison Lin)	Murphy's Law of Love	Danson Tang & Ivelyn Lee
2015	2015 Sanlih Drama Awards 華劇大賞	Best Screen Couple Award (Presenter: Lego Lee & Allison Lin)	Someone Like You	Kingone Wang & Lorene Ren
2015	2015 Sanlih Drama Awards 華劇大賞	Best Screen Couple Award (Presenter: Lego Lee & Allison Lin)	When I See You Again	Jasper Liu & Mandy Wei
2015	2015 Sanlih Drama Awards 華劇大賞	Best Kiss Award (Presenter: Baron Chen & Megan Lai)	Dear Mom	Melvin Sia & Joanne Tseng
2015	2015 Sanlih Drama Awards 華劇大賞	Best Kiss Award (Presenter: Baron Chen & Megan Lai)	Love Cuisine	Lego Lee & Allison Lin
2015	2015 Sanlih Drama Awards 華劇大賞	Best Kiss Award (Presenter: Baron Chen & Megan Lai)	Murphy's Law of Love	Danson Tang & Ivelyn Lee
2015	2015 Sanlih Drama Awards 華劇大賞	Best Kiss Award (Presenter: Baron Chen & Megan Lai)	Someone Like You	Kingone Wang & Lorene Ren
2015	2015 Sanlih Drama Awards 華劇大賞	Best Kiss Award (Presenter: Baron Chen & Megan Lai)	When I See You Again	Jasper Liu & Mandy Wei
2015	2015 Sanlih Drama Awards 華劇大賞	Best Crying Award (Presenter: Jasper Liu & Mandy Wei)	Be with You	Bobby Dou & Don Wong
2015	2015 Sanlih Drama Awards 華劇大賞	Best Crying Award (Presenter: Jasper Liu & Mandy Wei)	Bitter Sweet	Johnny Kou & Ma Zhi Qin
2015	2015 Sanlih Drama Awards 華劇大賞	Best Crying Award (Presenter: Jasper Liu & Mandy Wei)	Dear Mom	Ling Hong & Lu Hsueh Feng
2015	2015 Sanlih Drama Awards 華劇大賞	Best Crying Award (Presenter: Jasper Liu & Mandy Wei)	Someone Like You	Miao Ke-Li
2015	2015 Sanlih Drama Awards 華劇大賞	Best Crying Award (Presenter: Jasper Liu & Mandy Wei)	Someone Like You	Yin Fu
2015	2015 Sanlih Drama Awards 華劇大賞	Best Green Leaf Award (Presenter: Jack Lee & Beatrice Fang)	Bitter Sweet	Stanley Mei
2015	2015 Sanlih Drama Awards 華劇大賞	Best Green Leaf Award (Presenter: Jack Lee & Beatrice Fang)	Dear Mom	Yang Ming Wei
2015	2015 Sanlih Drama Awards 華劇大賞	Best Green Leaf Award (Presenter: Jack Lee & Beatrice Fang)	Love Cuisine	Nita Lei
2015	2015 Sanlih Drama Awards 華劇大賞	Best Green Leaf Award (Presenter: Jack Lee & Beatrice Fang)	Murphy's Law of Love	Phoebe Huang
2015	2015 Sanlih Drama Awards 華劇大賞	Best Green Leaf Award (Presenter: Jack Lee & Beatrice Fang)	Someone Like You	William
2015	2015 Sanlih Drama Awards 華劇大賞	Best Green Leaf Award (Presenter: Jack Lee & Beatrice Fang)	When I See You Again	Gao Meng Jie
2015	2015 Sanlih Drama Awards 華劇大賞	Best Green Leaf Award (Presenter: Jack Lee & Beatrice Fang)	When I See You Again	Sara Ding
2015	2015 Sanlih Drama Awards 華劇大賞	Best Powerful Performance Award (Presenter: Lu Hsueh Feng)	Bitter Sweet	Johnny Kou
2015	2015 Sanlih Drama Awards 華劇大賞	Best Powerful Performance Award (Presenter: Lu Hsueh Feng)	Bitter Sweet	Sunny Tu
2015	2015 Sanlih Drama Awards 華劇大賞	Best Powerful Performance Award (Presenter: Lu Hsueh Feng)	Bitter Sweet	Ma Chi Chiang
2015	2015 Sanlih Drama Awards 華劇大賞	Best Powerful Performance Award (Presenter: Lu Hsueh Feng)	Dear Mom	Lu Hsueh Feng
2015	2015 Sanlih Drama Awards 華劇大賞	Best Powerful Performance Award (Presenter: Lu Hsueh Feng)	Someone Like You	Miao Ke-Li
2015	2015 Sanlih Drama Awards 華劇大賞	Best Powerful Performance Award (Presenter: Lu Hsueh Feng)	When I See You Again	Debbie Chou
2015	2015 Sanlih Drama Awards 華劇大賞	Best Powerful Performance Award (Presenter: Lu Hsueh Feng)	When I See You Again	Vent Teng
2015	2015 Sanlih Drama Awards 華劇大賞	Best Potential Award (Presenter: Melvin Sia & Jason Tsou)	Be with You	Adrian Chen
2015	2015 Sanlih Drama Awards 華劇大賞	Best Potential Award (Presenter: Melvin Sia & Jason Tsou)	Be with You	Li Chung Lin
2015	2015 Sanlih Drama Awards 華劇大賞	Best Potential Award (Presenter: Melvin Sia & Jason Tsou)	Bitter Sweet	Esther Yang
2015	2015 Sanlih Drama Awards 華劇大賞	Best Potential Award (Presenter: Melvin Sia & Jason Tsou)	Love Cuisine	Ben Wu
2015	2015 Sanlih Drama Awards 華劇大賞	Best Potential Award (Presenter: Melvin Sia & Jason Tsou)	Love Cuisine	Sing Hong
2015	2015 Sanlih Drama Awards 華劇大賞	Best Potential Award (Presenter: Melvin Sia & Jason Tsou)	Love Cuisine	Xiao Xuan Su
2015	2015 Sanlih Drama Awards 華劇大賞	Best Potential Award (Presenter: Melvin Sia & Jason Tsou)	Love or Spend	Dayuan Lin
2015	2015 Sanlih Drama Awards 華劇大賞	Best Selling S-Pop Magazine Award (Presenter: Annie Chen)	Dear Mom	Melvin Sia
2015	2015 Sanlih Drama Awards 華劇大賞	Best Selling S-Pop Magazine Award (Presenter: Annie Chen)	Dear Mom	Joanne Tseng
2015	2015 Sanlih Drama Awards 華劇大賞	Best Selling S-Pop Magazine Award (Presenter: Annie Chen)	Love Cuisine	Lego Lee
2015	2015 Sanlih Drama Awards 華劇大賞	Best Selling S-Pop Magazine Award (Presenter: Annie Chen)	Love Cuisine	Allison Lin
2015	2015 Sanlih Drama Awards 華劇大賞	Best Selling S-Pop Magazine Award (Presenter: Annie Chen)	Murphy's Law of Love	Danson Tang
2015	2015 Sanlih Drama Awards 華劇大賞	Best Selling S-Pop Magazine Award (Presenter: Annie Chen)	Murphy's Law of Love	Ivelyn Lee
2015	2015 Sanlih Drama Awards 華劇大賞	Best Selling S-Pop Magazine Award (Presenter: Annie Chen)	When I See You Again	Jasper Liu
2015	2015 Sanlih Drama Awards 華劇大賞	Best Selling S-Pop Magazine Award (Presenter: Annie Chen)	When I See You Again	Mandy Wei
2015	2015 Sanlih Drama Awards 華劇大賞	China Wave Award (Presenter: Esther Liu & Joanne Tseng)	Love or Spend	Kingone Wang

=== 2016-2025 ===
The "2016 Sanlih Drama Awards" was held on 10 December 2016. The event was sponsored by Taiwan cosmetics company Dr.Douxi. A total of 11 awards were given out. Awards removed from the previous year were the "Best Green Leaf Award" and "Best Selling S-Pop Magazine Award". Newly added awards added were the "Viewers Choice Drama Theme Song Award" and VIDOL TV Best Drama Award. and is also the channel's flagship drama for the year. The drama is one of the 107 television shows ice skating Hearts on Ice Mean white Upcoming Taiwanese Drama Ivy Shao Yu-wei and Mario Maurer In Frozen Heart Coming Soon 2025

Year	Ceremony	Category	Drama	Nominee
		TBA	Frozen Heart	Ivy Shao & Mario Maurer
2016	2016 Sanlih Drama Awards 華劇大賞	Viewers Choice Drama Award (Presenter: SpeXial members: Feng-tian, Ming-chieh, Yi-lun, Teddy)	The Love Song	Darren Chiu & Vivi Lee
2016	2016 Sanlih Drama Awards 華劇大賞	Viewers Choice Drama Award (Presenter: SpeXial members: Feng-tian, Ming-chieh, Yi-lun, Teddy)	Refresh Man	Aaron Yan & Joanne Tseng
2016	2016 Sanlih Drama Awards 華劇大賞	Viewers Choice Drama Award (Presenter: SpeXial members: Feng-tian, Ming-chieh, Yi-lun, Teddy)	Better Man	Lin Yo-Wei & Cindy Yu
2016	2016 Sanlih Drama Awards 華劇大賞	Viewers Choice Drama Award (Presenter: SpeXial members: Feng-tian, Ming-chieh, Yi-lun, Teddy)	Prince of Wolf	Derek Chang & Amber An
2016	2016 Sanlih Drama Awards 華劇大賞	Viewers Choice Drama Award (Presenter: SpeXial members: Feng-tian, Ming-chieh, Yi-lun, Teddy)	Swimming Battle	Kingone Wang & Mandy Wei
2016	2016 Sanlih Drama Awards 華劇大賞	Viewers Choice Drama Award (Presenter: SpeXial members: Feng-tian, Ming-chieh, Yi-lun, Teddy)	V-Focus	Melvin Sia & Ling Hung
2016	2016 Sanlih Drama Awards 華劇大賞	Viewers Choice Drama Award (Presenter: SpeXial members: Feng-tian, Ming-chieh, Yi-lun, Teddy)	Back to 1989	Marcus Chang & Ivy Shao
2016	2016 Sanlih Drama Awards 華劇大賞	TBA	Frozen Heart	Mario Maurer
2016	2016 Sanlih Drama Awards 華劇大賞	Best Actor Award (Presenter: Ady An)	V-Focus	Melvin Sia
2016	2016 Sanlih Drama Awards 華劇大賞	Best Actor Award (Presenter: Ady An)	Prince of Wolf	Derek Chang
2016	2016 Sanlih Drama Awards 華劇大賞	Best Actor Award (Presenter: Ady An)	Better Man	Lin Yo-Wei
2016	2016 Sanlih Drama Awards 華劇大賞	Best Actor Award (Presenter: Ady An)	Better Man	Tender Huang
2016	2016 Sanlih Drama Awards 華劇大賞	Best Actor Award (Presenter: Ady An)	Refresh Man	Aaron Yan
2016	2016 Sanlih Drama Awards 華劇大賞	Best Actor Award (Presenter: Ady An)	The Love Song	Darren Chiu
2016	2016 Sanlih Drama Awards 華劇大賞	Best Actor Award (Presenter: Ady An)	Back to 1989	Marcus Chang
2016	2016 Sanlih Drama Awards 華劇大賞	Best Actor Award (Presenter: Ady An)	Swimming Battle	Kingone Wang
2016	2016 Sanlih Drama Awards 華劇大賞	Best Actress Award (Presenter: Leon Jay Williams & Esther Liu)	V-Focus	Ling Hung
2016	2016 Sanlih Drama Awards 華劇大賞	Best Actress Award (Presenter: Leon Jay Williams & Esther Liu)	Swimming Battle	Mandy Wei
2016	2016 Sanlih Drama Awards 華劇大賞	Best Actress Award (Presenter: Leon Jay Williams & Esther Liu)	Prince of Wolf	Amber An
2016	2016 Sanlih Drama Awards 華劇大賞	Best Actress Award (Presenter: Leon Jay Williams & Esther Liu)	Back to 1989	Mini Tsai
2016	2016 Sanlih Drama Awards 華劇大賞	Best Actress Award (Presenter: Leon Jay Williams & Esther Liu)	Back to 1989	Ivy Shao
2016	2016 Sanlih Drama Awards 華劇大賞	Best Actress Award (Presenter: Leon Jay Williams & Esther Liu)	Better Man	Shara Lin
2016	2016 Sanlih Drama Awards 華劇大賞	Best Actress Award (Presenter: Leon Jay Williams & Esther Liu)	Refresh Man	Joanne Tseng
2016	2016 Sanlih Drama Awards 華劇大賞	Best Actress Award (Presenter: Leon Jay Williams & Esther Liu)	The Love Song	Vivi Lee
2016	2016 Sanlih Drama Awards 華劇大賞	TBA	Frozen Heart	Ivy Shao
2016	2016 Sanlih Drama Awards 華劇大賞	Best Screen Couple Award (Presenter: Melvin Sia & Huang Wei-Ting)	Back to 1989	Marcus Chang & Ivy Shao
2016	2016 Sanlih Drama Awards 華劇大賞	Best Screen Couple Award (Presenter: Melvin Sia & Huang Wei-Ting)	Back to 1989	Yorke Sun & Mini Tsai
2016	2016 Sanlih Drama Awards 華劇大賞	Best Screen Couple Award (Presenter: Melvin Sia & Huang Wei-Ting)	V-Focus	Melvin Sia & Huang Wei-Ting
2016	2016 Sanlih Drama Awards 華劇大賞	Best Screen Couple Award (Presenter: Melvin Sia & Huang Wei-Ting)	Swimming Battle	Kingone Wang & Mandy Wei
2016	2016 Sanlih Drama Awards 華劇大賞	Best Screen Couple Award (Presenter: Melvin Sia & Huang Wei-Ting)	Prince of Wolf	Derek Chang & Amber An
2016	2016 Sanlih Drama Awards 華劇大賞	Best Screen Couple Award (Presenter: Melvin Sia & Huang Wei-Ting)	Better Man	Lin Yo-Wei & Cindy Yu
2016	2016 Sanlih Drama Awards 華劇大賞	Best Screen Couple Award (Presenter: Melvin Sia & Huang Wei-Ting)	Better Man	Tender Huang & Shara Lin
2016	2016 Sanlih Drama Awards 華劇大賞	Best Screen Couple Award (Presenter: Melvin Sia & Huang Wei-Ting)	Better Man	Jolin Chien & Hope Lin
2016	2016 Sanlih Drama Awards 華劇大賞	Best Screen Couple Award (Presenter: Melvin Sia & Huang Wei-Ting)	Refresh Man	Aaron Yan & Joanne Tseng
2016	2016 Sanlih Drama Awards 華劇大賞	Best Screen Couple Award (Presenter: Melvin Sia & Huang Wei-Ting)	The Love Song	Darren Chiu & Vivi Lee
2016	2016 Sanlih Drama Awards 華劇大賞	Best Kiss Award (Presenter: Ivy Shao & Eugenie Liu)	V-Focus	Melvin Sia & Huang Wei-Ting
2016	2016 Sanlih Drama Awards 華劇大賞	Best Kiss Award (Presenter: Ivy Shao & Eugenie Liu)	Swimming Battle	Kingone Wang & Mandy Wei
2016	2016 Sanlih Drama Awards 華劇大賞	Best Kiss Award (Presenter: Ivy Shao & Eugenie Liu)	Prince of Wolf	Derek Chang & Amber An
2016	2016 Sanlih Drama Awards 華劇大賞	Best Kiss Award (Presenter: Ivy Shao & Eugenie Liu)	Better Man	Jolin Chien & Hope Lin
2016	2016 Sanlih Drama Awards 華劇大賞	Best Kiss Award (Presenter: Ivy Shao & Eugenie Liu)	Refresh Man	Aaron Yan & Joanne Tseng
2016	2016 Sanlih Drama Awards 華劇大賞	Best Kiss Award (Presenter: Ivy Shao & Eugenie Liu)	The Love Song	Darren Chiu & Vivi Lee
2016	2016 Sanlih Drama Awards 華劇大賞	Best Kiss Award (Presenter: Ivy Shao & Eugenie Liu)	Back to 1989	Marcus Chang & Ivy Shao
2016	2016 Sanlih Drama Awards 華劇大賞	TBA	Frozen Heart	Ivy Shao & Mario Maurer
2016	2016 Sanlih Drama Awards 華劇大賞	Best Crying Award (Presenter: Sean Lee & Tracy Chou)	Swimming Battle	Kingone Wang & Mandy Wei
2016	2016 Sanlih Drama Awards 華劇大賞	Best Crying Award (Presenter: Sean Lee & Tracy Chou)	Prince of Wolf	Derek Chang & Amber An
2016	2016 Sanlih Drama Awards 華劇大賞	Best Crying Award (Presenter: Sean Lee & Tracy Chou)	The Love Song	Miao Ke-li & Lu Hsueh-Feng
2016	2016 Sanlih Drama Awards 華劇大賞	Best Crying Award (Presenter: Sean Lee & Tracy Chou)	Better Man	Jolin Chien & Hope Lin
2016	2016 Sanlih Drama Awards 華劇大賞	Best Crying Award (Presenter: Sean Lee & Tracy Chou)	Back to 1989	Yin Chao-te & Mini Tsai
2016	2016 Sanlih Drama Awards 華劇大賞	Best Powerful Performance Award (Presenter: Linda Liu & Juan Wang)	Prince of Wolf	Lin Wei
2016	2016 Sanlih Drama Awards 華劇大賞	Best Powerful Performance Award (Presenter: Linda Liu & Juan Wang)	Better Man	Jian Chang
2016	2016 Sanlih Drama Awards 華劇大賞	Best Powerful Performance Award (Presenter: Linda Liu & Juan Wang)	The Love Song	Miao Ke-li
2016	2016 Sanlih Drama Awards 華劇大賞	Best Powerful Performance Award (Presenter: Linda Liu & Juan Wang)	Back to 1989	Josie Leung
2016	2016 Sanlih Drama Awards 華劇大賞	Best Powerful Performance Award (Presenter: Linda Liu & Juan Wang)	Back to 1989	Yin Chao-te
2016	2016 Sanlih Drama Awards 華劇大賞	Best Potential Award (Presenter: Melvin Sia & Jason Tsou)	Swimming Battle	Peter Guan
2016	2016 Sanlih Drama Awards 華劇大賞	Best Potential Award (Presenter: Melvin Sia & Jason Tsou)	Prince of Wolf	Derek Chang
2016	2016 Sanlih Drama Awards 華劇大賞	Best Potential Award (Presenter: Melvin Sia & Jason Tsou)	Better Man	Cindy Yu
2016	2016 Sanlih Drama Awards 華劇大賞	China Wave Award (Presenter: Ady An)	V-Focus	Melvin Sia
2016	2016 Sanlih Drama Awards 華劇大賞		Back to 1989	Marcus Chang
2016	2016 Sanlih Drama Awards 華劇大賞	TBA	Frozen Heart	Mario Maurer
2016	2016 Sanlih Drama Awards 華劇大賞	Viewers Choice Drama Theme Song Award (Presenter: Peter Guan, Charles Tu & Aaron Lai)	V-Focus	Roll Your Eyes 翻白眼 by 831 八三夭
2016	2016 Sanlih Drama Awards 華劇大賞	Viewers Choice Drama Theme Song Award (Presenter: Peter Guan, Charles Tu & Aaron Lai)	Swimming Battle	Handsome to Break Up (帥到分手) by Nick Chou
2016	2016 Sanlih Drama Awards 華劇大賞	Viewers Choice Drama Theme Song Award (Presenter: Peter Guan, Charles Tu & Aaron Lai)	Swimming Battle	Unshakeable Rascals (熱血無賴) by Yoga Lin
2016	2016 Sanlih Drama Awards 華劇大賞	Viewers Choice Drama Theme Song Award (Presenter: Peter Guan, Charles Tu & Aaron Lai)	Prince of Wolf	Love Magic (愛戀魔法) by Bii
2016	2016 Sanlih Drama Awards 華劇大賞	Viewers Choice Drama Theme Song Award (Presenter: Peter Guan, Charles Tu & Aaron Lai)	Better Man	Faded Pictures (屬於你和我之間的事) by Vanness Wu
2016	2016 Sanlih Drama Awards 華劇大賞	Viewers Choice Drama Theme Song Award (Presenter: Peter Guan, Charles Tu & Aaron Lai)	Better Man	38 by Bii
2016	2016 Sanlih Drama Awards 華劇大賞	Viewers Choice Drama Theme Song Award (Presenter: Peter Guan, Charles Tu & Aaron Lai)	Refresh Man	You're The First to Come to Mind (第一個想到你) by William Wei
2016	2016 Sanlih Drama Awards 華劇大賞	Viewers Choice Drama Theme Song Award (Presenter: Peter Guan, Charles Tu & Aaron Lai)	The Love Song	Give Me One Love (想戀一個愛) by Della Ding
2016	2016 Sanlih Drama Awards 華劇大賞	Viewers Choice Drama Theme Song Award (Presenter: Peter Guan, Charles Tu & Aaron Lai)	Back to 1989	A Friend (我們是朋友) by Gary Chaw
2016	2016 Sanlih Drama Awards 華劇大賞	Viewers Choice Drama Theme Song Award (Presenter: Peter Guan, Charles Tu & Aaron Lai)	Back to 1989	Two People (兩個人) by Alien Huang
2016	2016 Sanlih Drama Awards 華劇大賞	Viewers Choice Drama Theme Song Award (Presenter: Peter Guan, Charles Tu & Aaron Lai)	Back to 1989	You Him Me (你他我) by Nine Chen
2016	2016 Sanlih Drama Awards 華劇大賞	VIDOL TV Best Drama Award (Presenter: Li Jing)	Better Man	Tender Huang & Jolin Chien
2016	2016 Sanlih Drama Awards 華劇大賞	TBA	Frozen Heart	Songs Xiang Lim Mao (和道妹) Ivy Shao

== Performances ==
Year	Performer(s)	Songs
2012	Mandy Tao	"Chemistry Love" (神魂電到) "En Route" (途中) "One In A Thousand" (好難得) "Micro Plus Happiness" (微加幸福)
2012	Coke Lee	"You Don't Know" "Don't Want You To Be Alone" (我不願讓你一個人) "Conductor" (指揮家) "Just Want To Hold You" (只想抱著你) "Temporary Boyfriend" (暫時的男朋友)
2013	Ding Dang	"Not Your Fault" (不是你的錯) "Don't Ask" (不要問) "I Love Him" (我愛他)
2014	Lego Lee	"In a Good Way"
2014	Aaron Yan	"That's Not Me" (這不是我) "The Unwanted Love" (多餘的我)
2015	Love Cuisine cast	"We Are Young" (我們青春)
2015	Dawen Wang & Joanne Tseng	"Roller Coaster" (雲霄飛車)
2016	Nick Chou with Swimming Battle cast	"Handsome to Break Up" (帥到分手)
2016	GJ	"What Is The Shape Of Your Love" (你的愛是甚麼形狀)
2016	Marcus Chang with Back to 1989 cast	"Two People" (兩個人)

== See also ==
- List of Asian television awards
