= Tracy Chou (actress) =

Taiwanese actress (born 1983)

- 周采詩
- Born: Chou Tsai-shih; 10 January 1983 (age 43); Taiwan
- Education: Fu Jen Catholic University (BA)
- Occupations: Actress; model
- Years active: 2004–present
- Children: 1

Tracy Chou Tsai-shih (Chinese: 周采詩; born 10 January 1983) is a Taiwanese actress. Beginning her modeling career in 2004, Chou made her acting debut in 2006 with the PTS television series Merry Me. She subsequently landed starring roles in several television dramas, including Hot Shot (2008), Bitter Sweet (2015), The Love Song (2016), and The World Between Us (2019). In 2022, she received a nomination for Best Supporting Actress in a Miniseries or Television Film in the 57th Golden Bell Awards for her triple roles in the HBO Asia series Twisted Strings.

== Early life and education ==
Chou was born on 10 January 1983. Her mother is a high school teacher, and her family resided in Taichung. She studied Japanese at Fu Jen Catholic University, graduating with a Bachelor of Arts. While in university, she was discovered by a talent scout and invited to film an advertisement with Jordan Chan. She began working as a model and filming advertisements starting from 2004. After signing with a talent agency, she pursued an acting career, a decision she described as "being just for fun".

== Career ==
Chou made her acting debut in the PTS television series Merry Me, and starred in two other series, Daughter of the Sun and Wings of Angel, the following year. She also appeared in Lee Kang-sheng's romance film Help Me Eros in the same year. She gained public recognition for her role in the 2008 sports drama Hot Shot alongside Jerry Yan, followed by a lead role in Giddens Ko's segment of the 2009 romance anthology film L-O-V-E. Her performance in Hot Shot faced criticism, leading her to consider quitting showbiz at that time. In 2009, she was sued by her talent agency Rock Records for breaching her contract by accepting job offers outside the agency (including appearing in the music video of Yoga Lin's "Fairy Tale") and for refusing to film in China. She paused her career during the lawsuit and returned to showbiz in 2010 after winning the case. She landed two main roles in Calling for Love and Channel-X in that year, followed by The Pop Can Boy in 2011. In 2012, Chou secured a main role as Seiko Itō, the Chinese-Japanese lover of Kai Hsiu's character, in the romance series Alice in Wonder City, a role she performed primarily in Japanese, a language in which she was fluent due to her university education. She also began to star in feature films after leaving her talent agency, including in the sports drama film Viva Baseball that year and in Henry Chan's 2013 romantic comedy 100 Days alongside Johnny Lu and Akira Chen. In 2014, she played the sister of Lee Wei's character, who appeared only in flashback scenes, in the drama series Lovestore at the Corner.

In 2015, Chou had her breakthrough role as Wang Shang-huan in the romance comedy series Bitter Sweet, earning a nomination for Best Actress at the 4th Sanlih Drama Awards. She starred as Hsia Yi-qing in the 2016 romance series The Love Song and appeared in the 2017 Taiwanese-Japanese television film Sakana Otoko. She received critical acclaim for her role as Ting Mei-mei in the 2019 drama series The World Between Us, for which she was shortlisted for the 54th Golden Bell Awards. After a supporting lead role as Hsia Tien-qing in the 2021 The Summer Temple Fair, Chou took on triple roles in the HBO Asia fantasy series Twisted Strings, earning a nomination for Best Supporting Actress in a Miniseries or Television Film in the 57th Golden Bell Awards. In 2024, she had a main role in the first segment of the horror anthology series Urban Horror and starred alongside Eugenie Liu in the drama film Daughter's Daughter.

== Personal life ==
Chou married a classmate from Fu Jen Catholic University in 2017, with whom she began dating while in school, and she gave birth to a son in 2019.

== Filmography ==
=== Film ===
| Year | Title | Role | Notes/Ref. |
|---|---|---|---|
| 2007 | Help Me Eros | Qi Qi (琪琪) | |
| 2009 | L-O-V-E | The Love Chaser | Segment: The Sixth Bangs |
| 2012 | Viva Baseball | Nancy | |
| 2013 | 100 Days | Xiao Wei (莫唯心) | |
| 2024 | Daughter's Daughter | Zhou Jiayi (周家儀) | |
| 2025 | Mudborn | Liu Hsin (劉芯) | |

=== Television ===
| Year | Title | Role | Notes/Ref. |
|---|---|---|---|
| 2006 | Merry Me | Cola Lin (林可柔) | Main role |
| 2007 | Daughter of the Sun | Su Hui-chung (蘇慧中) | Main role |
| 2007 | Wings of Angel | Sherry Kan (甘雪莉) | Recurring role |
| 2008 | Hot Shot | Zhan Jie-er (湛潔兒) | Main role |
| 2010 | Calling for Love | Yang Wei-chen (楊惟晨) | Main role |
| 2010 | Channel-X | Cho Yi-an (卓以安) | Main role |
| 2011 | The Pop Can Boy | Ye Ting (葉庭) | Main role |
| 2012 | Alice in Wonder City | Seiko Itô (伊藤聖子) | Main role |
| 2014 | Lovestore at the Corner | Tu Ke-chieh (杜可婕) | Main role |
| 2015 | Bitter Sweet | Wang Shang-huan (王尚歡) | Main role |
| 2016 | The Love Song | Hsia Yi-qing (夏以晴) | Main role |
| 2017 | Sakana Otoko | Chen Fen-fen (陳紛紛) | Main role; television film |
| 2018 | Single Ladies Senior | Tina | Cameo |
| 2019 | The World Between Us | Ting Mei-mei (丁美媚) | Main role |
| 2021 | The Summer Temple Fair | Hsia Tien-qing (夏天晴) | Main role |
| 2022 | Twisted Strings | Guo Xinyi/Yunxin/Madame Hong (郭欣怡/允心/洪姐) | Co-starring |
| 2024 | Urban Horror | Patty | Main role |
| 2024 | M Mission | Chen Shu-fen（陳淑芬） | Main role |
| 2025 | Forget You Not | Lin Chia-yun（林佳雲） | Main role |

== Awards and nominations ==
| Year | Award | Category | Work | Result | Ref. |
|---|---|---|---|---|---|
| 2015 | 4th Sanlih Drama Awards | Best Actress | Bitter Sweet | Nominated | |
| 2022 | 57th Golden Bell Awards | Best Supporting Actress in a Miniseries or Television Film | Twisted Strings | Nominated | |
