= Forget You Not =

Forget You Not may refer to:

- "Forget You Not" (song), a song by Little Mix from the album LM5
- Forget You Not (TV series), a Netflix Taiwanese television series
