= Miao Ke-li =

- 苗可麗
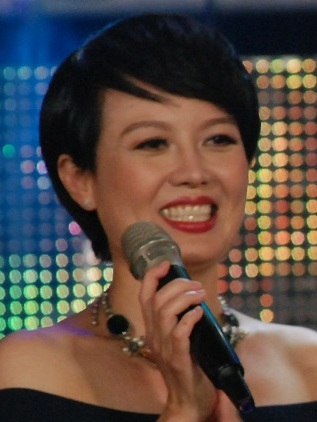
- Miao Ke-li in 2015
- Born: Wu Chia-chi (吳嘉琪); 13 January 1971 (age 55); Taichung, Taiwan
- Education: Youth Senior High School
- Occupations: Actress, television host, singer
- Years active: 1986—present
- Musical career
- Also known as: Wu Kang-hua (吳岡樺)
- Genre: Mandopop
- Instrument: Vocals

Miao Ke-li (Chinese: 苗可麗; born 13 January 1971) is a Taiwanese actress, television host and singer.

Born in Taichung, Miao began her career as a singer in 1988 after participating in a singing competition at the age of fifteen. She turned to acting in the late nineties with small roles in television series such as Ah Bian and Ah Jane. In 2002, Miao had her breakthrough role in Taiwanese-language series Fiery Thunderbolt. From then she starred in television series such as Taiwan Tornado, Golden Ferris Wheel and Unique Flavor. In 2013 she won Best Actress at the Golden Bell Awards for her work in Flavor of Life.

== Filmography ==
=== Television series ===
Year	English title	Original title	Role	Notes
1999	Qiao Xi Fu Yu Han Po Jia	巧媳婦與憨婆家		
1999	Taiwan Liao Tian Ding	台灣廖添丁	Yen Hung	
2000	Jiao A Gong Yi Bai Yuan	民視劇場－叫阿公一百元	Shu-chin	
2000	Ah Bian and Ah Jane	阿扁與阿珍	Hsu Lin Ya Chien	
2000	No Longer Cry	我不再哭泣		
2001	Taiwan Ah Cheng	台灣阿誠	Wu Jui-hsia	
2001	Rogue Professor	流氓教授	Teacher	
2002	The Legend Of Taiwan	戲說台灣之人蛇郎君	Hsiu-nu	
2002	Negative Line of Tears	負君千行淚	Lin Shui-hsien	
2002	Shi Jian Zi Nu	世間子女	Shu-fen	
2002	Fiery Thunderbolt	台灣霹靂火	Li Yen-ping	
2002	921 Love of Mountain City	921山城之愛	Chen Li-chu	
2003	Sky and Earth Has Affection	天地有情	Wu Jui-ying	
2003	Super Star	明星情人夢	Yeh Ling	
2004	Taiwan Tornado	台灣龍捲風	Liu Yu-ying	
2005	Golden Ferris Wheel	金色摩天輪	Ku Mei-lun	
2006	Unique Flavor	天下第一味	Hsu Ming-chu	
2007	Brown Sugar Macchiato	黑糖瑪奇朵	Principal	Cameo
2008	Your Home is My Home	歡喜來逗陣	Shih Shan-yi	
2008	Prince + Princess 2	王子看見二公主	Ning Sheng-nan	
2009	Magic 18	魔女18號	Pan Hsin-lien	
2009	My Family My Love	天下父母心	Kao Yen-hung	
2010	The King and the Pauper	雙龍傳	Miao Guifei	
2010	Lee's Family Reunion	家和萬事興	Chen Liyun	
2010	Chong Wu Yen	鍾無艷	Tien Ying	
2011	Boy and Girl	男女生了沒	Sung Hsiang-chin	
2011	Inborn Pair	真愛找麻煩	You-Chun	Cameo
2012	The Woman is Colored	女人花	Kao Lin Mei Hung / Kuei Ta Niang	
2013	Flavor of Life	含笑食堂	Liu Han-hsiao	
2015	Someone Like You	聽見幸福	Wang Yu-chen	
2015	Love	世間情	Li Chiu-yun	
2015	If God Loves	天若有情	Pan Yung-fang	
2016	The Love Song	大人情歌	Tao Hsiu-chiung	
2016	Golden Darling	原來1家人	Luo Man-sha	
2017	Love, Timeless	鐘樓愛人	Chou Mei-kuang	
2017	Taste of Life	甘味人生	Kayla	Cameo
2017	Home Sweet Home	真情之家	Wu Hsiao-li	
2019	A Thousand Goodnights	一千個晚安	Li Hui Zhen / Ms. Kuan	
2023	Fight For Justice	天道	Liu Fu-mei	
2024	Let's Talk About Chu	愛愛內含光	Qiu Ye Meizhi	

=== Film ===
Year	English title	Original title	Role	Notes
2013	David Loman	大尾鱸鰻	Nana	
2014	Lion Dancing	鐵獅玉玲瓏	Wang Mei-Chih	
2014	Taipei Factory II	臺北工廠 II	Xin-yi	segment "Luca"
2014	Paradise in Service	軍中樂園	A-hsia	
2014	The Accidental Robber	便利人生	Passerby	Television; cameo
2016	David Loman 2	大尾鱸鰻2	Nana	
2016	Where The River Flows	鮮肉老爸	Yang Chen-ying	Television
2017	All Because of Love	癡情男子漢	Man-li's mother	
2023	Miss Shampoo	請問，還有哪裡需要加強	Auntie Gold	

=== Variety show ===
Network	English title	Original title	Notes
CTV	The Ultimate Super Stars	巨星金曲	Host
CTV	Everybody Laugh!	大家來說笑	Stand-in host
CTS	Sing	台灣無限唱吟	Host
TTV	Zong Yi Da Shun Li	綜藝大順利	Host
TTV	One in a Million	百萬大明星	Regular guest
Star Chinese Channel	Female Wolf Club	女狼俱樂部	Host
Star Chinese Channel	Female Wolf Club Plus	女狼俱樂部Plus	Host
Star Chinese Channel	Lady Commander	一袋女王	Regular guest
EBC Variety	Lucky Strike	開運鑑定團	Host
Much TV	New Lucky Strike	新開運鑑定團	Host
Next TV	Pig King	豬哥壹級棒	Host
Videoland	Health Food	健康好食在	Host
SET Taiwan	Super Night Club	超級夜總會	Host; 2014—present

== Discography ==
=== Studio albums ===
Title	Album details	Track listing
Being Alone 想!想一個人	Released: 1988; Label: Fei Ge; Formats: CD	Track listing: 1. 想!想一個人; 2. 就在今年夏季; 3. 問世間的情; 4. 不要哭; 5. 承諾; 6. 失約; 7. 鑽石火; 8. 美麗的開始; 9. 那一年夏天; 10. 擁抱歡笑(伴唱音樂); 11. 想!想一個人(伴唱音樂); 12. 就在今年夏季(伴唱音樂)
Little Flying Dragon 小飛龍	Released: 1989; Formats: CD	Track listing: 1. 小飛龍

=== Singles ===
Year	Title	Notes
2015	"Di Wang Bi Li 帝王比例"	

== Published works ==
- Miao, Ke-li (2003). Shui Dou Bu Neng Qi Fu Wo ─ Miao Ke Li 28 Zhao Qiao Cha Mou De Jin Ke Yu Lv!. Taipei: Linking Publishing Company. ISBN 9570826266.

== Awards and nominations ==
Year	Award	Category	Nominated work	Result
2013	48th Golden Bell Awards	Best Leading Actress in a Television Series	Flavor of Life	Won
2015	50th Golden Bell Awards	Best Supporting Actress in a Television Series	Someone Like You	Nominated
2016	5th Sanlih Drama Awards	Best Tears Award	The Love Song	Won
