= A Thousand Goodnights =

Taiwanese television series

Chinese name
- Traditional Chinese: 一千個晚安
- Simplified Chinese: 一千个晚安
Transcriptions
Standard Mandarin
- Hanyu Pinyin: Yīqiān gè wǎn'ān
- Genre: Drama; Comedy; Romance
- Written by: Lin Pei Yu; Shao Hui Ting
- Directed by: Chen Rong Hui
- Starring: Nicholas Teo; Cindy Lien; Chen Bor Jeng; Miao Ke-li; Chung-Lin Li; Pipi Yao
- Country of origin: Taiwan
- Original language: Mandarin
- No. of seasons: 1
- No. of episodes: 20

Production
- Executive producer: Wang Shu-juan
- Producer: Fang Xiao-ren
- Running time: 90 minutes

Original release
- Network: Netflix; Sanlih E-Television
- Release: 29 March – 9 August 2019

A Thousand Goodnights (traditional Chinese: 一千個晚安; simplified Chinese: 一千个晚安) is a 2019 Taiwanese television series co-produced by Netflix and Sanlih E-Television. The series was written by Lin Pei Yu and Shao Hui Ting and directed by Chen Rong Hui. The series stars Nicholas Teo, Cindy Lien, Chen Bor Jeng, Miao Ke-li, Chung-Lin Li and Pipi Yao.

== Synopsis ==
In a quiet small train station, a worried woman arrived with a four-year-old girl, left behind a brown paper bag, and disappeared without a trace...

When Dai Jiahe (played by Chen Bozheng), the station master, saw the abandoned little girl, he immediately ran to comfort her, and told the legend of the wishing forest: "As long as you say good night to the forest every night for a thousand consecutive nights, your wish will come true!"

The little girl made a wish to "go home". After "a thousand good nights", the little girl's mother still did not arrive to pick her up. She was then adopted by the station master and got a new name "Dai Tian-qing".

To carry out her dad's wish and discover her roots, the grown-up Dai Tian-qing embarks on a journey around Taiwan and finds love and redemption on the way.

== Cast ==
=== Main starring ===
- Cindy Lien as Dai Tian-qing
- Nicholas Teo as Cheng Nuo
- Li Chung Lin as Wu Bo Sen
- Pipi Yao as Dai Tian-yu, Dai Tian-qing's adopted sister
- Chen Bor Jeng as Tai Chia-he, Dai Tian-qing's father
- Miao Ke-li as Li Hui Zhen / Ms. Kuan

=== Support roles ===
- Luo Bei An as Wu Hsiang Ping
- Zhu Lu Hao as Cheng Huai Zhan
- Cherry Hsieh as Hu Mei Lan
- Shen Hai Rong as Jin Xiang Yu, Wang Mei-mei's classmate
- Shara Lin as Cheng Shan
- Yang Jie Mei as Huang Bai Lien
- You Fang Chen as Chiu Su Lan
- Keelong Xu as Cha Pu
- Chen Ting Xuan as He Mei Mei
- Felicia Huang as Tsui-E
- Tsai Ming Shiou as Lai Chin Shui
