= Driving Miss Wealthy =

2004 Hong Kong film by James Yuen

- Film poster
- Traditional Chinese: 絕世好賓
- Simplified Chinese: 绝世好宾
- Hanyu Pinyin: Jué Shì Hào Bīn
- Jyutping: Zyut6 Sai3 Hou2 Ban1
- Directed by: James Yuen
- Written by: Jessica Fong; Lo Yiu-fai; James Yuen
- Produced by: Henry Fong; Derek Yee
- Starring: Lau Ching-wan; Gigi Leung
- Edited by: Leung Kwok-wing
- Music by: Raymond Wong
- Production companies: China Star Entertainment Group; One Hundred Years of Film; Film Unlimited; S & W Entertainment; Youth Film Studio
- Distributed by: China Star Entertainment Group
- Release date: 3 May 2004
- Running time: 103 minutes
- Country: Hong Kong
- Language: Cantonese
- Box office: HK$11,940,154

Driving Miss Wealthy (Chinese: 絕世好賓; Literal title: The World's Best Filipino) is a 2004 Hong Kong romantic comedy film directed by James Yuen and reunites La Brassiere's Lau Ching-wan and Gigi Leung. In the film, Lau poses a chauffeur hired to look after the spoiled rich woman played by Leung.

== Plot ==
Jennifer Fung (Gigi Leung) is a spoiled-rotten daughter of a millionaire. When Jennifer's father realizes that she's spending way too much money, he hires Kit (Sean Lau) to pretend to be a Filipino chauffeur named Mario and chaperone her. Then, Jennifer's father decides that he's going to teach her the value of money and hard-work, so he pretends to be ill, leaving all the money to Pamela, his business partner. Pamela kicks Jennifer out into the street to live with Kit/Mario. The two learn to live together and work hard to get back on top.

== Cast ==
- Sean Lau as Kit / Mario
- Gigi Leung as Jennifer Fung
- Benz Hui as Police officer
- Tats Lau as Dr. Andy Lau
- May Law as Ybonne
- Sophie Wong as Debbie
- Jim Chim as Peter / Aunt Mary / Uncle Big / policeman / faker
- Chow Chung as Tycoon Fung Kwok-lap
- Jamie Luk as Soldier applying for bodyguard job
- William Tuen as G$ applying for bodyguard job
- Gao Yuan as Pamela
- Henry Fong as Director of TV commercialJohnny Lu as Samson
- Poon An-ying as Harassed woman at identity parade
- Johnny Lu as Samson
- Leung Wai-yan as Jennifer's freeloading friend
- JoJo Shum as Jennifer's freeloading friend
- Poon Koon-lam
- Albert Mak as TV commercial crew
