= Calling for Love =

2010 Taiwanese TV series

- Promotional poster
- Also known as: 呼叫大明星; Hū Jiào Dà Míng Xīng
- Genre: Romance, Comedy
- Directed by: Lin He Long (林合隆)
- Starring: Charlene Choi; Mike He; Chen Zhi Kai; Tracy Chou
- Opening theme: Ai Ying Cai Hui Pin (愛贏才會拼) by Charlene Choi
- Ending theme: Qiao Qiao Hua (悄悄話)
- Country of origin: Republic of China (Taiwan)
- Original language: Mandarin
- No. of episodes: 14

Production
- Executive producer: Ouyang Chang Lin
- Producer: Chai Zhi Ping
- Running time: 90 mins (Sundays at 22:00 to 23:30)
- Production company: Comic Ritz International Production

Original release
- Network: Chinese Television System (CTS)
- Release: 16 May – 15 August 2010

Related
- Because of You (星光下的童話); Endless Love (愛∞無限)

Calling for Love (Chinese: 呼叫大明星; pinyin: Hūjiào Dà Míngxīng) is a 2010 Taiwanese drama starring Charlene Choi, Mike He, Chen Zhi Kai and Tracy Chou. It was produced by Comic Ritz International Production (可米瑞智國際藝能有限公司) with Chai Zhi Ping (柴智屏) as producer and directed by Lin He Long (林合隆).

The series was first broadcast in Taiwan on free-to-air Chinese Television System (CTS) from May 16 to August 15, 2010 every Sunday at 22:00-23:00. On October 18 then "Purple Rose" aired after was not approved by the mainland side quasi broadcast license late, and eventually replaced by the "Sweetheart", "starlight fairy". May 16, 2010, broadcast on CTS.

== Cast ==
- Charlene Choi as Chen De Xing 陳德馨
- Mike He as Bo Ye 柏野
- Chen Zhi Kai as Zhong Wei Li 鍾威力
- Tracy Chou as Yang Wei Chen 楊惟晨
- Li Shengn (李晟) as Bo Rou 柏柔
- David Wang (王耀慶) as Lin Qin Hong 林親雄
- Zhang Yu as Jack
- Xie Zheng Hao as Ke Fan 克凡
- Na Wei Xun as Wei De Zhi 魏得志
- Riva Chang as Mei Mi 美咪
- Ba Yu as Xiu Na 秀娜
- Hong Hai Ling (熊海靈) as Wei Chen's mother
- Xie Qi Wen (謝其文) as Lao Wen 老溫
- Jiang Hou Ren (姜厚任) as Yang Qin Tai 楊慶泰
- Chen You Fang as Lou Lou 露露
- Wang Kai (王凱) as Wang Rui 王瑞
- Xiang Yu Jie as Ms. Ho 何小姐
- Liu Huan (劉媛) as Yan Ni 閻妮
- Jiang Chao as Shi Te Long 史特龍
- Xiao Jian as Xi Wei 席維
- Lin Shou Jun (林秀君) as Wei Li's mother
- Huang Tai An as Motorist (ep1)
