= 100 Days (2013 film) =

- Film poster
- Directed by: Henry Chan
- Written by: Weiko Lin
- Screenplay by: Megi Hsu
- Produced by: Stacy Fan; Weiko Lin
- Starring: Johnny Lu; Tracy Chou; Soda Voyu; Akira Chen; Julianne Chu; Ming-Hsui Tsai
- Cinematography: Randy Che
- Edited by: Kenji Chen
- Music by: Mira Lin; Christopher Wong
- Production company: Unison Company
- Distributed by: Vie Vision Pictures
- Release dates: October 13, 2013 (Hawaii Film Festival); November 1, 2013 (Taiwan)
- Running time: 104 minutes
- Country: Taiwan
- Language: Mandarin

100 Days (Chinese: 真愛100天) is a 2013 Taiwanese romantic comedy film directed by Henry Chan, marking his second film since Gas.

== Plot ==
The main character is Bo Dan Wu (played by Johnny Lu), an ambitious rising star at a telecommunications company in Taipei. After learning of the death of his estranged mother, he reluctantly returns to his hometown in the Matsu Islands, specifically the picturesque Qinbi (芹壁村) Village, to pay his respects. Upon arriving, he learns of a local tradition requiring him to either marry within 100 days or wait three years before holding a wedding.

However, Bo Dan has no intention of getting married anytime soon. Fortunately, his stepbrother Zhen Fong (played by Soda Voyu) plans to marry his longtime fiancée Xiao Wei (played by Tracy Chou) in three days. Bo Dan soon realizes that Xiao Wei is actually his childhood sweetheart. When a typhoon prevents him from leaving the island, the two are confronted with the possibility of rekindling their past romance. Xiao Wei must ultimately choose between her devoted fiancé, who seems to be the right choice, and the man she has always loved.

== Cast ==
- Johnny Lu as Bo Dan Wu
- Akira Chen as Mo Shu
- Tracy Chou as Xiao Wei
- Julianne Chu (朱蕾安)
- Tsai Ming-hsiu (蔡明修) as Liu Ching
- Soda Voyu (蘇達) as Zhen Fong

== Production ==
Principal photography for the island scenes took place in Taiwan’s Matsu Islands, particularly in Qinbi (芹壁村) Village on Beigan (北竿) Island. Director Chan chose the location because the village appeared “untouched by time” and could function as a character in the film. However, filming in Matsu was costly due to the lack of filmmaking infrastructure, requiring the crew to transport equipment and personnel, including trucks, cranes, generators, and extras, to the island. Similar to the story’s protagonist, the production team was also stranded on the island several times due to typhoons. Additional scenes were filmed in Taipei, Taiwan.

== Release ==
The film premiered at the 33rd Hawaii International Film Festival on October 13, 2013, with English subtitles. Following this, the film saw a nationwide release in Taiwan on November 1, 2013.
