= The Love Song (TV series) =

- Promo poster
- 大人情歌
- Genre: Romance; Family
- Created by: Sanlih E-Television
- Written by: Du Zheng Zhe 杜政哲 (Screenwriter coordinator, ep 1-9); Lu Qi Ya 露綺亞(Screenwriter coordinator, ep 10-32); Hong Li Yan 洪立妍 (ep 1-9); Deng Kai Lun 鄧凱綸 (ep 1-9); Liao Yun Jing 廖昀靖 (ep 1-9); Lai Yuan Ting 賴垣廷 (ep 1-9); Shao Hui Ting 邵慧婷 (ep 10-70); Lin Pei Yu 林珮瑜 (ep 10-70); Zheng Ying Min 鄭英敏 (ep 10-70)
- Directed by: Zhang Jia Xian 張佳賢
- Starring: Miao Ke-li; Lu Hsueh-Feng 呂雪鳳; Vivi Lee 李維維; Darren Chiu 邱凱偉; Tracy Chou; Sean Lee 邵翔; Steven Sun 孫其君; Julie Ting 丁巧唯
- Opening theme: Give Me One Love 想戀一個愛 by Della Ding
- Ending theme: The Mask 面具 by Gary Chaw
- Country of origin: Taiwan
- Original languages: Mandarin; Hokkien
- No. of seasons: 1
- No. of episodes: 70

Production
- Producer: Chen Xiu Qing 陳秀卿
- Production location: Taiwan
- Camera setup: Multi camera
- Running time: 60 minutes
- Production companies: Polyland International Entertainment Corporation Limited 寶麗來國際娛樂股份有限公司; Sanlih E-Television

Original release
- Network: SET Metro; EBC Variety
- Release: 24 February – 31 May 2016

Related
- Love or Spend; Better Man

The Love Song (Chinese: 大人情歌; pinyin: dà rén qíng gē; literally "Adult Love Song") is a 2016 Taiwanese romance, television series starring Miao Ke-li, Lu Hsueh-Feng, Vivi Lee, Darren Chiu, Tracy Chou, Sean Lee, Steven Sun and Julie Ting. Shooting began on January 15, 2016 and episodes aired as soon as the shoot finished. The original broadcast began on February 24, 2016 on SET Metro, airing weekdays (Monday through Friday) at 8:00 pm.

== Synopsis ==
Loneliness sometimes puts strange ideas into your head. Jiang Hsiao Chien is a married woman who is lonely most of the time because her husband works in Mainland China. In order to feel less alone, Hsiao Chien establishes her own community apartment so that she can surround herself with people and create a warm sense of home. But Ho Hsiao Chuen, Hsiao Chien’s first love and ex-boyfriend, becomes one of her new neighbors. As the two begin to interact with each other again under the same roof, their feelings for each other return. What will Hsiao Chien do when she is faced with the choice of following her heart or staying true to her marriage?

== Cast ==
=== Main cast ===
- Miao Ke-li as Tao Xiu Qiong
- Lu Hsueh-feng 呂雪鳳 as Gao Lin Man Man 高林滿滿
- Vivi Lee 李維維 as Jiang Xiao Qian 蔣曉茜
- Darren Chiu 邱凱偉 as He Xiao Quan 何孝權
- Tracy Chou as Xia Yi Qing 夏以晴
- Sean Lee 邵翔 as Gao Ding Ya 高定亞
- Steven Sun 孫其君 as He Xiao Kang 何孝康
- Julie Ting 丁巧唯 as Xu Tong 許彤

=== Supporting cast ===
- Shen Meng-sheng 沈孟生 as Xu Jian Chang 許建昌
- Dabe Chen 安婕希 as Xiao An 小安
- Zhan Jia Ru 詹佳儒 as Hou Zi Da 侯子達
- Tannie Huang 黃妤榛 as Yang Ru Ru 楊如如
- Zhou Ying 周颖 as Hua Ke Xin 華可欣
- Chris Huang 黃書維 as Wang Da Shu 王大樹
- Ma Ya 馬雅 as Xiao Mao 小毛
- Stanley Mei 梅賢治 as Ah Li 阿力

=== Cameo ===
- Gabriel Lan 藍鈞天 as Bai Shao Qi 白紹祺
- Ma Chi-chin 馬之秦 as Bai Li Bing Yu 白李冰玉
- Lai Pei-ying 賴佩瑩 as Shao Qi's employee
- Lin Chun-yung 綠茶 as He Bi Sheng 何畢昇
- Zooey Tseng 曾允柔 as Xiao Ya 小雅
- Vicky Huang 黃沐妍 as Li Li 麗麗
- Huang Hsin-ti 黃心娣 as Zhen Ni Hua 珍妮花
- David Lin 博焱 as Gao Ding Yu 高定宇
- Kang Yin-yin 康茵茵 as Xiao Ting Ru 蕭亭如
- Yu Yen-chen 余彥宸 as Gao Wei Wei 高唯唯
- Angela Lee 李佳豫 as Wu Zi Zi 吳姿姿
- Titan Huang 黃泰安 as Mr. Ke
- Debbie Yao 姚黛瑋 as 金飾店老闆娘
- Ada Pan 潘慧如 as Liu Tian Ling 劉天凌
- Xenia Yang 楊雅筑 as Xiao Mei 小美
- Lu Wen-hsueh 魯文學 as Wang Yong Da 王永達
- Lu Chen-hsi 陸侲曦 as Jian Qi Shou 健氣受
- Edison Wang 王家梁
- Yang Li-yin 楊麗音 as Xiao Quan and Xiao Kang's mother

== Soundtrack ==
- Give Me One Love 想戀一個愛 by Della Ding 丁噹
- The Mask 面具 by Gary Chaw 曹格
- Ten Years Later 十年後 by Rene Liu 劉若英
- Love Myself More 只是不夠愛自己 by Della Ding 丁噹
- Are You Willing? 妳願不願意 by Gary Chaw 曹格
- 往前跑 by Gary Chaw 曹格
- Starry Sky 星空 by Mayday 五月天
- Orange Jasmine 七里香 by Jay Chou 周杰倫
- And You? 那你呢 by CosmosPeople 宇宙人
- Talk 說 by Murmurshow 慢慢說樂團
- Differences by Murmurshow 慢慢說樂團
- Love Staying at Home 喜歡待在家 by Murmurshow 慢慢說樂團

== Broadcast ==
Network	Country	Airing Date	Timeslot
SET Metro	Taiwan	February 24, 2016	Monday to Friday 8:00-9:00 pm
EBC Variety	Taiwan	February 24, 2016	Monday to Friday 9:00-10:00 pm
Astro Shuang Xing	Malaysia	February 25, 2016	Monday to Friday 6:00-7:00 pm
VV Drama	Singapore	March 23, 2016	Monday to Friday 7:00-8:00 pm
UNTV	Philippines	This 2021	TBA

== Episode ratings ==
Competing dramas on rival channels airing at the same time slot were:

- SET Taiwan - Taste of Life
- FTV - Dowry, Spring Flower
- TTV - HARU (re-run), Fighting Meiling
- CTV - Love Yunge from the Desert, Golden Darling
- CTS - Thank You for You Have Loved Me, Nirvana in Fire (re-run), The Legend of Mi Yue
- GTV Variety - War Family

Air Date	Episodes	Weekly Average Ratings	Rank
Feb 24-26, 2016	1-3	0.84	4
Feb 29-Mar 4, 2016	4-8	0.96	3
Mar 7-11, 2016	9-13	1.02	3
Mar 14-18, 2016	14-18	1.13	4
Mar 21-25, 2016	19-23	1.07	4
Mar 28-Apr 1, 2016	24-28	1.07	4
Apr 4-8, 2016	29-33	0.94	5
Apr 11-15, 2016	34-38	0.95	5
Apr 18-22, 2016	39-43	0.95	5
Apr 25-29, 2016	44-48	1.03	5
May 2–6, 2016	49-53	0.98	5
May 9–13, 2016	54-58	0.91	4
May 16–20, 2016	59-63	1.02	4
May 23–27, 2016	64-68	1.10	4
May 30–31, 2016	69-70	1.09	4
Average ratings			

== Awards and nominations ==
Year	Ceremony	Category	Nominee	Result
2016	2016 Sanlih Drama Awards	Viewers Choice Drama Award	The Love Song	Nominated
2016	2016 Sanlih Drama Awards	Best Actor Award	Darren Chiu	Nominated
2016	2016 Sanlih Drama Awards	Best Actress Award	Vivi Lee	Nominated
2016	2016 Sanlih Drama Awards	Best Powerful Performance Award	Miao Ke-Li	Nominated
2016	2016 Sanlih Drama Awards	Best Crying Award	Miao Ke-Li & Lu Hsueh-Feng	Won
2016	2016 Sanlih Drama Awards	Best Kiss Award	Darren Chiu & Vivi Lee	Nominated
2016	2016 Sanlih Drama Awards	Best Screen Couple Award	Darren Chiu & Vivi Lee	Nominated
2016	2016 Sanlih Drama Awards	Viewers Choice Drama's Song Award	"Give Me One Love" - Della Ding	Nominated
