= The Ex-Man =

2018 Taiwanese television series

- Chinese: 前男友不是人
- Hanyu Pinyin: Qiánnányǒu Bùshì Rén
- Genre: Romance, Fantasy
- Written by: Yang Wan Ru; Yang Bi Feng; Wu Mei Zhi; Lian Kai Hong; Heaven Hai; Li Wen Yi; Yang Hui Juan; Chen Pei Yao
- Directed by: Danny Teng
- Starring: Rainie Yang; Lan Cheng-lung; Johnny Lu; Li Xing
- Opening theme: 猴lonely by Harlem Yu
- Ending theme: Lessons In Love 忘課 by Rainie Yang
- Country of origin: Taiwan
- Original language: Mandarin
- No. of episodes: 13

Production
- Producer: Tang Sheng Rong
- Production companies: Gala Television; Greener Grass Production; Third Man Entertainment

Original release
- Release: May 18 – August 10, 2018

The Ex-Man (Chinese: 前男友不是人) is a 2018 Taiwanese television series starring Rainie Yang, Lan Cheng-lung, Johnny Lu and Li Xing. Filming took place from 27 July 2017 to 15 November 2017. The series first aired on TTV every Friday at 10:00 pm, beginning on 18 May 2018.

== Plot ==
Li Qin Ai (Rainie Yang), a 31-year-old magazine photographer, is content with both her career and her relationship with her boyfriend, Zhou Li Yang (Johnny Lu). She has tried hard to forget her first love, Dai Hai An (Lan Cheng-lung), following their breakup 10 years prior. When Hai An unexpectedly reappears in Qin Ai's life, there are immediately noticeable issues with him. Firstly, he appears as his 18-year-old self from their youth and is “half-transparent”.

Qin Ai begins to wonder why she is the only person who can “see” Hai An and whether he is actually dead, appearing before her as a ghost. Regardless of the circumstances, it is clear that Hai An has no intention of leaving her alone and negotiates with Qin Ai to live with her. Is this Hai An's attempt to reconcile his past with Qin Ai, or will this strange situation cause Qin Ai to question the certainty of her future?

== Cast ==
=== Main cast ===
- Rainie Yang as Li Qin Ai 黎親愛
- Lan Cheng-lung as Dai Hai An 戴海安
- Johnny Lu as Zhou Li Yang 周立陽
- Li Xing as Zhong Shu Ying 鍾書盈

=== Supporting cast ===
- Heaven Hai as Chen Da Fa 陳大發
- Hsueh Shih-ling as Xu Sheng Ren 許聖仁
- Kerr Hsu as editor-in-chief
- Hsieh Chiung-hsuan as Li Wang Hua 黎王花
- Cai Ah Bao as Li Yu Shu 黎玉樹
- He Yi Qi as Shan Ling 閃靈
- Duke Wu as Li Bao Bei 黎寶貝
- Long Chen Han (隆宸翰) as Steve
- Yu Chen (雨晨) as Huang Mei Zhen (Xiao Mei) 黃美珍 (小美)
- Yu Yan Chen (余彥宸) as Zhong Zi Qi (Qi Qi) 鍾子奇 (奇奇)
- Alice Huang as Joyce

== Soundtrack ==
- (猴lonely) by Harlem Yu
- Lessons In Love (忘課) by Rainie Yang
- Courage (勇氣) by Chang Chen-yue
- Youth Lies Within (青春住了誰) by Rainie Yang
- There'll Be A Day (總有一天) by Fang Wu
- Process of Love (陶瓷) by Rennie Wang
- Don't Love Him (沒那麼愛他) by Christine Fan
- (壞東西) by Makiyo Kawashima
- You Love Her So Much (你那麼愛她) by Kevin Lin feat. Sam Lee
- I Wanna Be With You by Jill Hsu
- It's You (就是你) by Christine Fan

== Ratings ==
Competing dramas on rival channels airing at the same time slot were:
- FTV - Intern Doctor
- SET Metro - Between (re-run)
- SET Taiwan - Father's Wish (re-run)

Air Date	Episode	Episode Title	Average Ratings
May 18, 2018	1	Arch-enemy vs. Fiancé 大魔王 vs. 未婚夫	0.73
May 25, 2018	2	Stay attached vs. Let go 眷戀 vs. 放下	0.72
June 1, 2018	3	Courage vs. Loyalty 勇氣 vs. 義氣	0.58
June 8, 2018	4	Need for Love vs. Marriage Proposal 求愛 vs. 求婚	--
June 15, 2018	5	Add as friend, End relationship 加入好友, 解除關係	0.64
June 22, 2018	6	Marriage for Women vs. Confusion for Men 女婚 vs. 男昏	--
June 29, 2018	7	Li Qin Ai vs. Sorting Out a Relationship 黎親愛 vs. 釐清愛	0.55
July 6, 2018	8	Love vs. Betrayal 被愛 vs. 背叛	--
July 13, 2018	9	A Short While vs. A Lifetime 一陣子 vs. 一輩子	0.75
July 20, 2018	10	Going Closer to You vs. Leaving You 走近你 vs. 離開你	0.62
July 27, 2018	11	Love is Tiring vs. Love is Blind 愛好忙 vs. 愛很茫	0.59
August 3, 2018	12	愛情裡的你 vs. 工作裡的我	0.51
August 10, 2018	13	Goodbye, Hello	--

== Broadcast information ==
Network	Country	Airing Date	Timeslot
TTV Main Channel	Taiwan	May 18, 2018	Friday 10:00-11:30 pm
GTV Drama	Taiwan	May 19, 2018	Saturday 8:00-9:30 pm
UNTV	Philippines	This 2021	TBA
