= Johnny Lu =

American-Taiwanese actor (born 1977)

- Born: Johnny Chen; May 8, 1977 (age 49); Taipei, Taiwan
- Education: University of California, Irvine (BA)
- Occupations: Actor; singer; television host
- Years active: 2000–present
- Spouse: Tammi (m. 2008)
- Children: 2

Chinese name
- Traditional Chinese: 路斯明
Transcriptions
Standard Mandarin
- Hanyu Pinyin: Lù Sīmíng
Southern Min
- Hokkien POJ: Lō͘ Su-bêng
- Musical career
- Also known as: Lu Sze-ming; Lu Siming
- Genres: Mandopop
- Instrument: Vocals

Johnny Lu (Chinese: 路斯明; Pe̍h-ōe-jī: Lō͘ Su-bêng, born May 8, 1977) is a Taiwanese-American actor.

== Life and career ==
Lu was born in Taipei City, Taiwan. His father, Chen Kung, was one of the founding members of the Bamboo Union triad in Taiwan. Lu's parents divorced, and then at the age of eight Lu moved to America, where he spent the rest of his childhood. He later attended University of California, Irvine and earned a Bachelor of Arts (B.A.) in English studies.

After various modeling work, Lu crossed over to acting in 2002, and subsequently had small roles in films such as Lost in Time, Fantasia and Driving Miss Wealthy. In 2008, he returned to Taiwan and appeared in his first Mandarin-language series, Police et vous, playing the role of a businessman. Lu then starred in numerous television series such as Who's The One, Next Heroes, In Between, True Love 365, Life Plan A and B, as well as the film 100 Days, which was released in 2013. Had a cameo role for one episode in Brothers Sun, a Netflix original in 2024.

== Personal life ==
Lu married his high school girlfriend, Tammi, in Los Angeles in 2008. They have a son and a daughter.

== Filmography ==
=== Television series ===
| Year | English title | Original title | Role | Notes |
|---|---|---|---|---|
| 2007 | H.I.T | 히트 | | |
| 2008 | Sayang Sayang | | Marcus Tan | |
| 2008 | Police et Vous | 波麗士大人 | Chiang Chin-yung | |
| 2008 | Three Women | 這三個女人 | Mr. X | |
| 2008 | Justice for Love | 天平上的馬爾濟斯 | Chen Chun-yang | |
| 2009 | Qing Kong Ji Zhou | 晴空濟州 | Howard | |
| 2009 | The Will | 一切從遺囑開始 | Pan Guosheng | |
| 2010 | Happy Together | 青梅竹馬 | James | Alternative title: 4 Friends |
| 2010 | The Gifts | 女王不下班 | Lin Sheng-chieh | Alternative title: 4 Gifts |
| 2011 | Strangers When We Meet | 相逢何必曾相識 | Chuang Hsun | |
| 2011 | Who's The One | 我的完美男人 | Yang Kai-chung | |
| 2011 | Next Heroes | 真的漢子 | Kao Chang | |
| 2012 | Fondant Garden | 翻糖花園 | Tan Rui | |
| 2012 | In Between | 半熟戀人 | Meng Ke-Huai | |
| 2012 | What Is Love | 花是愛 | Meng Ke-Huai | Episode 1 |
| 2012 | Dong Men Si Shao | 東門四少 | Groom | Cameo |
| 2013 | True Love 365 | 求愛365 | Lai Chun-chieh | |
| 2013 | The Queen! | 女王的誕生 | Yang Rui | |
| 2014 | High Heels and a Scalpel | 白袍下的高跟鞋 | Chin Shao-yang | |
| 2015 | Premonition | | Jonah Lee | |
| 2015 | Aquarius | 星座愛情水瓶女 | Fu Po-feng | |
| 2016 | Life Plan A and B | 植劇場-荼蘼 | Eason Jung Yi-chao | |
| 2016 | High 5 Basketball | High 5 制霸青春 | Sze Po-jan | |
| 2017 | Intern Doctor | 實習醫生鬥格 | | Cameo |
| 2018 | My Ex-Man | 前男友不是人!? | Chou Li-yang | |
| 2019 | Kin | | Charles Kwan | |
| 2020 | Wacko At Law | 王牌辯護人 | | |
| 2021 | Island Nation 2 | 國際橋牌社2 | Chen Ching-tang | |
| 2024 | Imperfect Us | 不夠善良的我們 | Mr. Lin | |

=== Film ===
| Year | English title | Original title | Role | Notes |
|---|---|---|---|---|
| 2003 | Lost in Time | 忘不了 | Sharon's husband | |
| 2004 | Fantasia | 鬼馬狂想曲 | Lotus gangster | |
| 2004 | Papa Loves You | 這個阿爸真爆炸 | Keung | |
| 2004 | Driving Miss Wealthy | 絕世好賓 | Samson | |
| 2005 | Set Up | 凶男寡女 | Edmund | |
| 2005 | Set to Kill | 借兵 | Billy Wong | |
| 2005 | The Unusual Youth | 非常青春期 | Big Shot | |
| 2006 | On the Edge | 黑白道 | Tung Kin-man | |
| 2006 | Wo Hu | 臥虎 | Chief Inspector Ming | |
| 2006 | Fatal Contact | 黑拳 | Wai | |
| 2006 | The Shopaholics | 最愛女人購物狂 | Choosey's best man | |
| 2007 | A Mob Story | 人在江湖 | Contractor for assassin | |
| 2008 | Fatal Move | 奪帥 | Jacky Ho Wing-kit | Alternative title: Triad Wars |
| 2011 | Sin Sation | 感官犯罪 | Yang Tzu-wei | Television |
| 2012 | Bang Bang Formosa | 寶島大爆走 | Ma Hao | |
| 2013 | 100 Days | 真愛100天 | Wu Bo-tan | |
| 2014 | Lost Sheep | 羊在火爐前走失了 | Chen Chien | Television |
| 2015 | Article 274 in Criminal Law | 刑法第274條 | Kao Yu-te | Television |
| 2015 | Rainbow Fairy | 尋物少女 | Lin Tai-te | Television |
| 2018 | Tomorrow's Star | 明日之星 | Manager | |
| 2018 | My Turtle Honey Girlfriend | | | |
| 2019 | The Last Thieves | 聖人大盜 | Kao Yu-hsiu | |
| 2025 | A Good Child | | David, Ah Hua's Boyfriend | |

=== Variety show ===
| Year | English title | Original title | Notes |
|---|---|---|---|
| 2002 | Entertainment News | 天下娛樂通 | Host |

=== Music video ===
| Year | Artist | Song title |
|---|---|---|
| 2002 | Miriam Yeung | "The Shining" ("閃靈") |
| 2017 | A-mei | "Full Name" ("連名帶姓") |

== Discography ==
| Year | Title | Notes |
|---|---|---|
| 2015 | "All Through the Night 擁抱我" | |
| 2016 | "Thank You 謝謝你" | |

== Awards and nominations ==
| Year | Award | Category | Nominated work | Result |
|---|---|---|---|---|
| 2017 | 52nd Golden Bell Awards | Best Supporting Actor in a Television Series | Life Plan A and B | Nominated |
