= Forget You Not (TV series) =

Taiwanese Netflix television series

Chinese name
- Traditional Chinese: 忘了我記得
- Simplified Chinese: 忘了我记得
Transcriptions
Standard Mandarin
- Hanyu Pinyin: Wàngle Wǒ Jìdé
- Genre: Slice-of-life comedy drama
- Written by: Tsai Pao-chang; Ho Shing-ming; René Liu
- Directed by: René Liu
- Starring: Chin Han; Hsieh Ying-xuan; Esther Liu; Tracy Chou; Chen Yi-wen
- Theme music composer: George Chen; Annie Lo
- Country of origin: Taiwan
- Original language: Taiwanese Mandarin
- No. of seasons: 1
- No. of episodes: 8

Production
- Executive producer: Aileen Li
- Producers: Aileen Li; Icha Liu
- Cinematography: Eric Chao
- Editors: Chiang Yi-ning; Shieh Meng-ju
- Running time: 41–60 minutes
- Production company: Filmagic Pictures

Original release
- Network: Netflix
- Release: 23 May 2025

Forget You Not (Chinese: 忘了我記得; pinyin: Wàngle Wǒ Jìdé) is a 2025 Taiwanese Netflix original series written and directed by René Liu. The series stars Hsieh Ying-xuan and Chin Han. The series was released globally on Netflix on May 23, 2025.

== Synopsis ==
Cheng Le-le (Hsieh Ying-hsuan) is a convenience store clerk who, after enduring a series of personal setbacks, unexpectedly finds a new path in life by stepping onto the stand-up comedy stage. As she navigates her newfound career, she also faces challenges in her personal life, including a strained relationship with her father (Chin Han) and a complicated dynamic with her ex-husband, Chang Kai (Wallace Huo). Through humour and resilience, Le-le embarks on a journey of self-discovery and healing.

== Cast ==
=== Main ===
- Chin Han as Cheng Kuang-chi, Le-le's father
- Hsieh Ying-hsuan as Cheng Le-le

=== Recurring ===
- Esther Liu as Huang Su-fei
- Tracy Chou as Lin Chia-yun
- Chen Yi-wen as Mark, the producer of Talk Show.
- Pan Ke-yin as stage manager
- Ko Cheng as Ken, Le-le and Su-fei's colleague.
- Yan Yu-rong as little Cheng Le-le
- Chiang Chien-lung as Jack, Chia-yun's husband.

=== Guest stars ===
- Wallace Huo as Chang Kai, Le-le's ex-husband
- Wang Po-chieh as young Cheng Kuang-Chi
- Ger Lei as Kai's mother
- Chao Yung-hsin as Liu Hsiu-lien, Kuang-chi's friend
- Lieh Lee as Wang Mei-hwei, Kuang-chi's friend
- Li Kwan-tao as Kai's father
- Phoebe Huang as a difficult customer at convenience store
- RD Huang as Le-le's friend, a comedian.
- Wu Chien-ho as a difficult customer at convenience store
- Tang Yung-hsu as Nini, Le-le's colleague at convenience store.
- Jake Hsu as an ER doctor
- Yen Yi-wen as a difficult customer in tour group
- Grace Lu as a difficult customer in tour group
- Pu Hsueh-liang as convenience store manager
- Liu Chang-hao as the General Manager of the travel agency
- Danniel Chen as Talk Show host
- Ken Lin as Chen Da-zai, Kai's business partner.
- Ma Nien-hsien as Jiang Shi-rong, Kai's business partner.
- Chung Chen-han as Jason, Kai's business partner
- Hsu Nai-han as Amy, Da-zai's wife.
- Lin Tzu-xi as Patricia, Shi-rong's wife.
- Aaron Lai as Roger, Jason's partner.
- Julia Wu as Wang Hsiao-fang, Kuang-chi's ex-wife, Le-le's mother.
- Yang Li-yin as Chin, Hsiao-fang's friend and neighbor.
- Liao Li-ling as Mrs. Liu, the Chengs' neighbor.
- Yun Jon-yue as Mr. Tang, Kuang-chi's friend.
- Alice Lee as Mrs. Tang, Tang's wife.
- Yao Chun-yao as an outpatient doctor
- Huang Teng-hui as a bike shop owner
- Wang Yuxuan as a coffee shop staff
- Ryan Fu as Mr. Chen, Kuang-chi's friend.
- Tuo Chung-hua as a policeman
- Sylvia Chang Ai-cha as a lady on the MRT

== Reception ==
=== Viewership ===
Forget You Not premiered to strong viewership across East Asia. Within 48 hours of its release, it reached the No. 2 spot on Taiwan's Netflix Daily Top 10 list and remained in the Top 5 for over a week. The series also charted in the Top 10 rankings in Hong Kong, Malaysia, and Singapore, attracting audiences with its blend of psychological drama and supernatural themes.

=== Critical Response ===
The series received generally favorable reviews from both audiences and critics. Critics also highlighted the show's cinematography, which effectively juxtaposed urban Taipei with surreal memory sequences.

=== Plagiarism Controversy ===
In March 2025, Forget You Not faced allegations of plagiarism, with critics and viewers noting similarities between its premise and that of Amazon Prime Video's The Marvelous Mrs. Maisel. Observers pointed out parallels in the narrative structure, character development, and thematic elements. These allegations sparked discussions on social media platforms, particularly within Taiwanese fan communities.

Netflix responded to the allegations by issuing an official statement denying any plagiarism. The company asserted that Forget You Not was an original concept developed by Taiwanese screenwriters and had undergone a rigorous internal review process. A Netflix Asia-Pacific spokesperson stated: “We take intellectual property rights seriously. While thematic overlaps can occur in global storytelling, Forget You Not is a distinct and independently developed series.” As of April 2025, no legal action has been initiated, and the creators of The Marvelous Mrs. Maisel have not publicly commented on the situation.
