= Bitter Sweet (TV series) =

2015 Taiwanese television series

- Promo poster
- 軍官·情人
- Genre: Romance; Family; Comedy
- Created by: Sanlih E-Television
- Written by: Chen Pei Yin (Screenwriter coordinator); Zhou Ping Zhi(Screenwriter coordinator); Lin Pei Yu; Lin Ruo Chen; Wu Xiang Ying; Chen Kai Zhu (ep 28-42)
- Directed by: Lin Qing Zhen 林
- Starring: Ma Zhi Qin; Johnny Kou; Sunny Tu br/>Esther Liu; Tracy Chou; Steven Sun; Esther Yang; Xiu Jie Kai; Michael Zhang; Ahn Zhe
- Opening theme: "Something" by Yen-j
- Ending theme: "Dare To Be Lonely In Someone Else Arms 我敢在你懷裡孤獨" by Rene Liu
- Country of origin: Taiwan
- Original language: Mandarin
- No. of seasons: 1
- No. of episodes: 74

Production
- Executive producer: Liu Qiu Ping
- Producers: Wang Zhong Zheng; Zheng Zhi Wei
- Production location: Taiwan
- Camera setup: Multi camera
- Running time: 60 minutes
- Production company: Taiwan Cloud Media

Original release
- Network: SETTV
- Release: 23 July – 3 November 2015

Bitter Sweet (Chinese: 軍官·情人; pinyin: jun guan · qing reng) is a 2015 Taiwanese romantic comedy television series produced by Sanlih E-Television, starring Ma Zhi Qin, Johnny Kou, Sunny Tu, Esther Liu, Tracy Chou, Steven Sun, Esther Yang, Xiu Jie Kai, Michael Zhang, and Ahn Zhe as the main cast. Filming began on July 8, 2015, and wrapped up in October 30, 2015. First original broadcast began July 23, 2015, on SETTV channel, airing weekly from Monday till Friday at 8:00-9:00 pm.

== Cast ==
=== Main cast ===
- Ma Tse-chin as Jiang Tian Ai
- Johnny Kou as Wang Da Shan
- Sunny Tu as Ye Zhi Lin
- Esther Liu as Wang Shang Wen
- Tracy Chou as Wang Shang Huan
- Steven Sun as Wang Shang Hao
- Esther Yang as Wang Shang Mo
- Hsiu Chieh-kai as Yang Yu Fan
- Michael Zhang as Zhu Yu Ting
- Ahn Zhe as Du Zheng Hui

=== Supporting cast ===
- Shen Meng-sheng as Liu Mu Sen
- Grace Ko as Huang En Ci
- Yorke Sun as Jiang An Jie
- Lyla Lin as Ai Mei Xin
- Ray Yang as Li Zhi Xiang
- Stanley Mei as Zhang Zhi Yuan
- Zhan Jia Ru as Lin Shang Jun
- Ryan Kuo as Peng Cheng You
- Le Le / Rou Rou as Du Tian Tian
- Liu Ji Fan as Lee
- Debbie Huang as Zheng Fen Ling
- Lan Jing Heng as Xiao Long
- Wang Dao-nan as Ai Sheng Li
- Derek Chen as Di Xiang

=== Cameo ===
- Yang En Ti as Lin Xiao Ling
- Joe Lin as Joe
- Huang Yi Yan as May
- Liu Yu Wei as Rui Rui
- Huang Tai An as Guan Zhu
- Andy Liu as Zhi Xiang's father
- Zhou Ying as Fei Fei
- Qi Yi Guo as battalion chief counselor
- Li Rui Shen as Mr. Mao
- Wang Yue-feng as Da Tou
- Chen Jian An as reporter
- Cindy Yen as Tracy
- Chien Te-men as Lu Qiang
- Mico Zhang as Tina
- Shen Hai-jung as CEO Xue
- Chen Yu-mei as Zhi Xiang's mother

== Soundtrack ==
- "Something" by Yen-j
- "Dare To Be Lonely In Someone Else Arms 我敢在你懷裡孤獨" by Rene Liu
- "The Past 過往" by Yen-j
- "Give 一直給" by Yen-j
- "Eternal Happiness 永恆的快樂" by Yen-j
- "Move Forward 往前" by Cosmospeople
- "I Can't Help But To Love You 我無法不愛你" by Magic Power
- "You Have Always Been Here 原來你都在" by Della Ding
- "To Home 寫信回家" by Rene Liu
- "Peaceful Time 歲月靜好" by Rene Liu

== Broadcast ==
Network	Country	Airing Date	Timeslot
SETTV	Taiwan	July 23, 2015	Monday to Friday 8:00-9:00 pm
ETTV	Taiwan	July 23, 2015	Monday to Friday 9:00-10:00 pm
Astro Shuang Xing	Malaysia	July 26, 2015 (until September 24, 2015)	Sunday to Thursday 6:00-7:00 pm
Astro Shuang Xing	Malaysia	September 25, 2015	Monday to Friday 6:00-7:00 pm
VV Drama	Singapore	August 25, 2015	Monday to Friday 7:00-8:00 pm

== Episode ratings ==
Competing dramas on rival channels airing at the same time slot were:
- SET Taiwan - Ordinary Love, Taste of Life
- FTV - Dowry
- TTV - If God Loves
- CTV - The Empress of China, The Romance of the Condor Heroes, The Four
- CTS - Lady & Liar, Cruel Romance, The Cage of Love, Boss & Me, Nirvana in Fire

Air Date	Episodes	Weekly Average Ratings	Rank
Jul 23–24, 2015	1-2	1.79	6
Jul 27–31, 2015	3-7	1.47	4
Aug 3-7, 2015	8-12	1.72	3
Aug 10–14, 2015	13-17	1.81	3
Aug 17–21, 2015	18-22	2.12	3
Aug 24–28, 2015	23-27	2.13	3
Aug 31–Sep 4, 2015	28-32	2.15	3
Sep 7–11, 2015	33-37	1.96	3
Sep 14–18, 2015	38-42	2.10	3
Sep 21–25, 2015	43-47	1.96	4
Sep 28–Oct 2, 2015	48-52	2.29	4
Oct 5–9, 2015	53-57	2.03	3
Oct 12–16, 2015	58-62	2.14	3
Oct 19–23, 2015	63-67	2.11	3
Oct 26–30, 2015	68-72	2.19	3
Nov 2–3, 2015	73-74	2.44	3
Average ratings		2.02	

== Awards and nominations ==
Ceremony	Category	Nominee	Result
2015 Sanlih Drama Awards	Best Actor Award	Johnny Kou	Nominated
2015 Sanlih Drama Awards	Best Actor Award	Ahn Zhe	Nominated
2015 Sanlih Drama Awards	Best Actor Award	Shiou Chieh Kai	Nominated
2015 Sanlih Drama Awards	Best Actress Award	Esther Liu	Nominated
2015 Sanlih Drama Awards	Best Actress Award	Tracy Chou	Nominated
2015 Sanlih Drama Awards	Best Cry Award	Johnny Kou & Ma Zhi Qin	Nominated
2015 Sanlih Drama Awards	Best Green Leaf Award	Stanley Mei	Nominated
2015 Sanlih Drama Awards	Best Powerful Performance Award	Johnny Kou	Won
2015 Sanlih Drama Awards	Best Powerful Performance Award	Sunny Tu	Nominated
2015 Sanlih Drama Awards	Best Powerful Performance Award	Ma Zhi Qin	Nominated
2015 Sanlih Drama Awards	Best Potential Award	Esther Yang	Nominated
2015 Sanlih Drama Awards	Viewers Choice Drama Award	Bitter Sweet	Nominated
