= Esther Yang =

Taiwanese actress (born 1987)

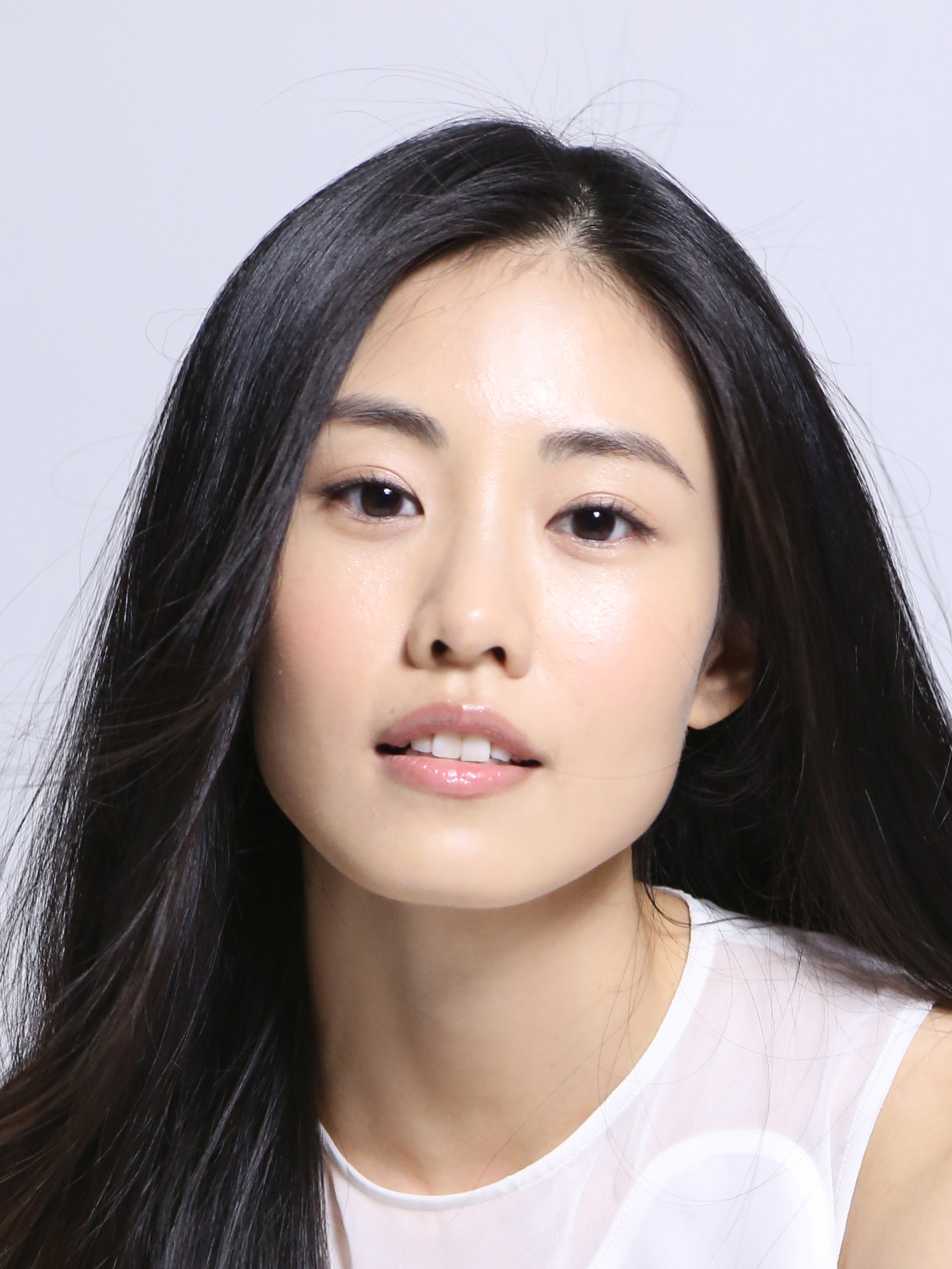
- Born: Yang Yung-tsun; 2 May 1987 (age 39); Taipei, Taiwan
- Occupation: actress

Chinese name
- Traditional Chinese: 陽詠存
- Simplified Chinese: 阳咏存
Transcriptions
Standard Mandarin
- Hanyu Pinyin: Yáng Yǒngcún

Esther Yang (born Yang Yung-tsun; Chinese: 陽詠存; pinyin: Yáng Yǒngcún) is a Taiwanese actress.

== Filmography ==
=== Television series ===
Year	English title	Original title	Role	Notes
2012	Love, Now	真愛趁現在	Yang Yi-qing	
2014	Mr. Right Wanted	徵婚啟事	Li Yi Ping	
2015	Bitter Sweet	軍官·情人	Wang Shang Mo	
2015	Life Is Beautiful	初一的心愿	Cai Jiayi	
2016	Behind Your Smile	浮士德的微笑	Jian Xiaoyue	
2017	Home Sweet Home	真情之家	Wenxin/"Ivy"	
