= Night Market Life =

2009–2011 Taiwanese TV series

- Also known as: Xia's Night Market
- Chinese: 夜市人生
- Hokkien POJ: Iā‑chhī Jîn‑seng
- Genre: History; Romance; Office Politics; Tokusatsu; Family
- Written by: Tay Kaizhong
- Directed by: Li Yuefeng; Li Qinnan; Zhang Zhihong
- Starring: Chen Meifeng; Morning Chang; Peng Chia-chia; Jimmy Ni; Wang Shih-hsien; Fon Cin; Mike Lee; Chiang Tsu-ping
- Opening theme: 夜市人生 by Weng Li-you
- Ending theme: 問感情 by Tsai Hsiao-hu 請你記得我的好 by Liu Xiangping 落花泪 by Long Qianyu & Tsai Hsiao-hu 城里的月光 by Mavis Hee 商水的傍 by Weng Li-you 親愛的小孩 by Ou Liyi 女人香 by Cao Yayi 迷魂香 by Weng Li-you 胜者為王 by Wang Shih-hsien 一片天 by Wang Shih-hsien 用心 by Long Qianyu 不能講的秘密 by Weng Li-you 我是一片云 by Lin Shuquan 愛情哈哈 by Chen Xiaoyun 今生只為你 by Chen Shuiyi & Tang Li 海甲天 by Zhu Haijun
- Country of origin: Taiwan
- Original language: Hokkien
- No. of episodes: 410 (original run); 1008 (overseas version)

Production
- Producers: Guo Jianhong; Lin Huijun; Zhao Jinhu
- Production locations: Taipei, Taiwan Hualien County, Taiwan Miyazaki Prefecture, Kyushu, Japan
- Running time: 120-150 minutes

Original release
- Network: Formosa Television
- Release: 22 December 2009 – 19 July 2011

Night Market Life (Chinese: 夜市人生; Pe̍h-ōe-jī: Iā-chhī Jîn-seng) is a Taiwanese Hokkien television drama that began airing on Formosa Television in Taiwan on 22 December 2009. This is also known as the first HD drama ever broadcast on Formosa Television.

It stars Chen Meifeng, Morning Chang, Peng Chia-chia (澎恰恰), Jimmy Ni (倪齊民), Wang Shih-hsien, Fon Cin, Mike Lee (李政穎) and Chiang Tsu-ping among others.

Very little of the show is actually set in a night market. Rather, the show is centered on several vendors at a night market whose children befriend each other and go their separate paths upon reaching adulthood. As the series' popularity grew, the story was expanded to span two generations of characters; the children of the first part are grown up in the second part, which began on 7 April 2010 and the theme song was changed to dialect version.

The show aired in Taiwan every weeknight at prime time (20:00) with episodes which have ranged in length from 135 to 150 minutes including commercial advertisements. The producers received funding from the Government Information Office to produce the series in high definition. With admiration and some criticism, the show concluded on 19 July 2011, when the brand-new television drama of Formosa Television, Father and Son, was released.

== Plot ==
The story takes place between 1998 and 2008 where children grow up from childhood in a Night Market to adulthood in the outside world. Cai Yue Xia (Maria) (Chen Meifeng) works as a Chinese Herb Soup hawker in her store at the Jin Hua Night Market. She has a husband, Li Qing Xiang (Lewis) (Louis Hsiao) who is a businessman. Together, they have a son, Li You Zhi (Bryan) (Child: Liu Yi Qian, Adult: Wang Shih-hsien) and a daughter, Li You Hui (Chloe) (Child: Peng Min Jia, Adult: Fon Cin). They were once a happy family until Qing Xiang betrayed his wife and married He Nana (Gracie) (Zhang Qiong Zhi) and had a daughter named Li Xiao Xuan (Winny) (Child: Li Yu Feng, Adult: Chu Xuan). He Nana was not pleased that Qing Xiang did not give her a right status, so she challenges Yue Xia and despises her two children. Qing Xiang is rather cowardly and not willing to help Yue Xia.

Yue Xia divorces Qing Xiang and marries Jiang Yi Guan (Charles) who is the ex-boyfriend of Fang Qia Qia (Audra), mother of Jin Da Feng (Dylan), a politician and wife of Jin Ju Fu (Jimmy). Yi Guan is a gang leader and he is assisted by Hei Ren (Joachim) and Bai Mu (Nicholas), but has a soft heart when it comes to problems of Yue Xia's family and You Zhi and his classmates. Yue Xia's life gets even worse because of such fact makes Qia Qia seek her as her enemy. Meanwhile, Qing Xiang has a business partner, Ye Han Liang (Johnny), a fashion clothes seller, and the father of Ye Ru Yi (Cassie). Qing Xiang and Han Liang have always against each other ever since their negotiation for co-business have failed. Xu Lai Fa (Ryan) comes from a poor family and have to sell chewing gum to make ends meet. He has a mother, Huang Jin Xiu (Angela) who worked very hard to earn income for the family and a father, Xu Bing Ding (Jason) who is a drunkard once a gambler. You Zhi, You Hui, Da Feng, Xiao Xuan, Ru Yi and Lai Fa are classmates when they are young and care for each other at all times as they grew up, they are known as the "golden six" because they are the most notable school choir club member. The School Choir Club was led by Jiang Yi Fan (Eunice), sister of Jiang Yi Guan until she dies when she give birth to Pan Jia Xin (Mirabel). One day, Yi Guan was sentenced to prison for 20 years after found guilty of killed Tie Zhi (Jaws).

20 years later, all the six schoolmates lead their different paths of life. Li You Zhi is just a common construction labour and often got into fight with gangsters whenever they approach him and marries Pan Ke Xin (Natasha). Li You Hui and Li Xiao Xuan hold high positions at Yilida Bicycle Company, they often got into conflict wherever they are but Xiao Xuan was supported strongly at the back by Fang Qia Qia. Jin Da Feng opens his own company and becomes its CEO. Xu Lai Fa becomes a doctor and marries Ye Ru Yi, a makeup receptionist but he is highly ambitious until he left Ru Yi and marries Chen Chun Chun (Venisia). Both You Hui and Xiao Xuan declared their love to Jin Da Feng, caused Da Feng to be pushed into a love triangle affairs. Wu Yin Min and Fang Qia Qia cooperate together as gangster leaders and try to break down Li You Zhi and his friend's life. Xu Lai Fa loses his friends, his wife's and his money because of his greed and was disposed by many. So he uses Zhou Xiu Xiu (Marina) to seduce Chen He Qian in order to rise up again.

Ru Yi managed to give birth of her child and take care of her for the rest of her life. You Hui becomes vengeful and stops anything or anyone that gets into her path, this is especially after she divorces with Da Feng because he was in romance with Xiao Xuan. You Hui then snatched husband Yang Hao Tian (Felix) after that who is already in love with Chun Zhen (Leonore). Yang Hao Tian is heir to Yilida but due to him being seduced by You Hui, he left the bicycle company and established a new one called Shuda. This strained his relationship with his family. One day, Jin Da Feng started to become cruel heart and killed Fan Ke Xin one day in the latter's wedding with You Zhi, he is wanted by the police and is on the run. Meanwhile, both Lai Fa and Ru Yi found themselves both have Leukaemia and Cervix Cancer respectively. Lai Fa is taken care by Zhou Xiu Xiu and have regret in the process. As the series goes by, Li You Zhi saw Xu Lai Fa and Jin Da Feng's regret and desire to redeem their mistakes. Li You Zhi work with his friends together to overpower Ying Ming and Qia Qia and send them to justice. After Ying Ming and Qia Qia apprehended, Da Feng surrenders to the police while Ru Yi have her child taken care by Lai Fa's father and flew to United States with her father to receive treatment.

== Summary ==
Cai Yuexia operates a stall at a night market while her husband, Qingxiang, works in the mainland. Their family falls apart when Qingxiang sets up another family outside. Yuexia struggles to bring up her children with the help of the head of the night market.

== Cast ==
=== Main cast ===
Cast	Role	Description
Wang Shih-hsien	Li Youzhi	Younger Version portrayed by Liu Yu Qian; Li Youhui's older brother, Li Xiaoxuan's half-older brother Zheng Kaili's Friend; Li Qingxiang and Cai Yuexia's Son; Pan Kexin's Husband
Chen Meifeng	Cai Yuexia	Li Youhui and Li Youzhi's Mother
Chang Chen-kuang	Jiang Yi Guan	Cai Yuexia 's Love Interest; Li Youzhi 's Idol; Jin Dafeng's biological father Jiang Yi Fan's older brother
Chiang Tsu-ping	Pan Kexin	Li Youzhi 's Wife; Murdered by Jin Dafeng and died (Deceased - Episode 716)
戶英	Yang Zonghua	Yang Aimei and Yang Haotian's Father; Li Youhui's Father in law
Fon Cin	Li Youhui	Younger Version Portrayed by Peng Min Jia; Li Youzhi's younger sister Li Qingxiang and Cai Yuexia's Daughter; Li Xiaoxuan's half-older sister Yang Haotian's Wife
Xiao Da Lu	Li Qingxiang	Li Youhui, Li Xiaoxuan and Li Youzhi's Father
Er Sheng Min	Ye Hanliang	Ye Ruyi's Father
Lei Hong	Jin Jufu	Jin Dafeng's Foster Father; Jin Zu En's (Michael) father
張璀姿	He Nana	Li Qingxiang 's Mistress; Li Xiaoxuan's Mother
谷音	Li Qianhui	Pan Kexin's Mum
Liu Hsiu-wen	張彩韓	
Lu Xianglu	Chen He Qian	Chen Chunchun, Chen Zhiqiang's Father
Peng Chia-chia	Xu Binding	Xu Laifa's Father
Huang Ming Jie	Du Shixiong	Jason; Pan Kexin's Father; Pan Jiaxin's Uncle; CEO of JF Company; Li Youzhi's father in law
Gao Xinxin	Huang Jinxiu	Xu Laifa's mother
Wang Can	Xu Laifa	Villain; Younger Version portrayed by Bo Feng Qia; Ye Ruyi and Chen Chunchun's Ex Husband; Suffers from brain cancer Xiuxiu's Husband, Xu Bingding and Huang Jinxiu's son
Cheng Chung Yin	Fang Qia Qia	Jin Jufu's Ex-wife; Jin Dafeng's Mother
De Sheng	He Chunzhen	Yang Haotian's Love Interest
Lu Jia Yi	Ye Ruyi	Younger Version portrayed by Bo Pei Fen; Ye Hanliang's Daughter; Chen Zhiqiang's wife Chen Chun Chun's sister-in-law Chen Heqian's daughter-in-law Xu Laifa's ex-wife Xu Bingding and Huang Jinxiu's ex-daughter-in-law
Mike Lee	Jin Dafeng	Main Villain but repented in the last episodes Younger Version Portrayed by Xu Yang Chuan; Killed Pan Kexin; Likes Youhui; Amy's Ex-Husband; Fang Qiaqia's Son; Jiang Yiguan's biological son Ding Peiqi's Husband; Jin Jufu's foster son Jiang Yifan's biological nephew Li Youzhi and Xu Laifa's friend Arrested in the end (Arrested - Episode 1008)

=== Supporting cast ===
Cast	Role	Description
Shen Shiming	Chen Zhiqiang	Ye Ruyi's Husband; Chen Heqian's son Chen Chunchun's older brother
Huang Jian Qun	Wu Yingming	Villain
He Shu Yuan	Yang Haotian	Li Youhui's Husband; Amy Yang's half-younger brother Yang Zonghua, Xiao Huiyu's son
Gao Yu Zhen	Yang Aimei (Amy)	Yang Zonghua's daughter Yang Haotian's half-elder sister Hong Huoqiang's love interest
Chu Xuan	Li Xiaoxuan	Younger Version Portrayed by Li You Feng; Li Qingxiang and He Nana's Daughter; Ah Zhong's wife
Jiang Jun Shu	Ah Zhong	Xiaoxuan's Husband; Died after fighting
Wang Zhong	Chen Chun Chun	Xu Laifa's ex-wife Li Weilun's wife Chen Heqian's daughter Chen Zhiqiang's younger sister

=== Cameo appearances ===
Cast	Role	Description
Liang Xin Mei	Tian Mimi	Singer and dancer in night market
Sharon Kao	A Hua	Dancer in the night market
Chen Bor-jeng	Wu Ah Lu	Work at Night Market
Bing Jia Qi	Wang Shu Nu	Work at Night Market
Sabrina Pai	Ding Pei Qi	City Councilor

== HD broadcasts of the show ==
=== Limited run HD broadcast on HiHD ===
13 episodes of the HD version of the show were broadcast on HiHD, later PTS3. The reason that only 13 episodes were broadcast were most likely to test HD television in Taiwan, as HiHD was the first HD TV channel in Taiwan.

=== TCS HD broadcast ===
Only the first generation of the show was broadcast in HD on CTS Main Channel starting January 16, 2018 on 8pm to 10pm, 2 one-hour format episodes per weekday. Due to TCS mainly broadcasting in Mandarin, the dubbed Singapore version was shown. The reason why only the first generation was broadcast was most likely due to it being a quick filler for the prime time slot and/or to test the HD version of the show.

=== Taiwan rerun broadcast ===
The show was rebroadcast in a new 16:9 HD version, showing new info on the sides of the screen on FTV One. The timeslot for the rerun is Weekdays 1pm to 3pm, with each day showing 2 one-hour format episodes. After airing, the remastered episodes also get released on Formosa TV's YouTube channel.

== International broadcast ==
=== Singapore broadcast ===
The series was broadcast on weekends from 7 to 10pm but due to local broadcast laws prohibiting radio or television broadcasts in Chinese dialects, the show was dubbed into Mandarin when it aired on Singapore's MediaCorp Channel 8, thus making it the first channel to broadcast the show in Mandarin.

==== Tentative everyday broadcast (2012) ====
There were plans for this drama to extend to an every-night broadcast after Journey to the West ended on 30 August 2012, as it is similar in terms of the number of episodes. It was planned to be broadcast every night at 7:00 pm, with 7–10 episodes shown each week, and to end its run in November 2013. Many criticisms were posted online when The Spirits of Love took over the everyday broadcast in July 2010, and MediaCorp Channel 8 also planned for more Malaysian productions and other overseas drama serials to be broadcast. Furthermore, there was a revamp of the evening primetime slot, with current affairs programme Hello Singapore airing from 6:30 pm to 7:30 pm and the original long-form socio-drama 118 airing from 7:30 pm to 8:00 pm on weekdays. Thus, the drama was only aired on weekends and ended its run on 4 July 2015, marking a telecast of more than four years and four months on Channel 8.

==== Repeat telecast (2014 and 2017) ====
In Singapore, the drama was later repeated on weekday mornings on MediaCorp Channel 8, with two back-to-back episodes airing from 10:30 am to 12:30 pm in Mandarin with Chinese subtitles. This repeat run occupied the Monday to Thursday 10:30 am–12:30 pm slot from 6 April 2017 until it ended on 11 September 2019.

=== Vietnam broadcast ===
In Vietnam, the Vietnamese-dubbed version, titled Đời sống chợ đêm, was broadcast on the THVL1 channel operated by Vinh Long Radio and Television in a 5:00 pm timeslot.

=== Malaysia broadcast ===
On October 20, 2010, the show was broadcast on Weekdays in the 3:30pm–4:30pm timeslot (this was later changed to 4-5pm) on Astro Hua Hee Dai. The drama was also broadcast in Malaysia on 8TV for two episodes with one hour each from Monday to Friday, at 11:30 MST and 14:00 MST with a 30 minutes break of its Midday Mandarin News at 12:30 MST starting 1 January 2015.

== Music ==
=== Theme Song ===
Song title	Performer
夜市人生 (中文翻)	Weng Li-you
夜市人生	Weng Li-you

=== Sub Theme Songs ===
Song title	Performer
問感情	Tsai Hsiao-hu
請你記得我的好	Liu Xiangping
落花泪	Long Qianyu & Cai Xiaohu
城里的月光	Mavis Hee
商水的傍	Weng Li-you
親愛的小孩	Ou Liyi
女人香	Cao Yayi
迷魂香	Weng Li-you
胜者為王	Wang Shih-hsien
一片天	Wang Shih-hsien
用心	Long Qianyu
不能講的秘密	Weng Li-you
我是一片云	Lin Shuquan
愛情哈哈	Chen Xiaoyun
今生只為你	Chen Shuiyi & Tang Li
海甲天	Zhu Haijun

== See also ==
- Taiwanese drama
