= The Unforgettable Memory =

- Mainland China DVD cover (first 108 episodes)
- Also known as: Unforgettable Memory
- Traditional Chinese: 意難忘
- Simplified Chinese: 意难忘
- Hanyu Pinyin: Yì Nán Wàng
- Hokkien POJ: Ì Lân Bông
- Genre: Drama; Romance
- Directed by: Wang Wei
- Starring: Wang Shih-hsien; Chang Feng-shu
- Opening theme: 1. 情難忘 by Wang Shih-hsien; 2. 出外人 by Chan Ya-wen; 3. 擔輸贏 by Jody Chiang; 4. 堅持 by Weng Li-you; 5. 愛你的代價 by Gao Xiangpeng and Feng Rui'e; 6. 雪中花 by Wang Shih-hsien and Sun Shu-may; 7. 無人來作伴 by Lin Shan and Weng Li-you; 8. 愛了無後悔 by Long Qianyu and Weng Li-you; 9. 愛伊希地魯 by Weng Li-you
- Ending theme: 1. 雲中月圓 by Wang Shih-hsien and Sun Shu-may; 2. 昨夜星辰 by Yao Xinying; 3. 意難忘 by Tsai Hsiao-hu; 4. 真愛只有你 by Lin Shan and Fu Zhenhui; 5. 無人來作伴 by Lin Shan and Weng Li-you; 6. 風中的玫瑰 by Long Qianyu; 7. 今生最愛的人 by Tsai Hsiao-hu
- Country of origin: Taiwan
- Original language: Taiwanese
- No. of episodes: 526 (original run); 872 (overseas version)

Production
- Producers: Guo Hongliang, Lin Huijun
- Running time: 90 minutes (Episodes 1–285); 105 minutes (Episodes 286–525); 50 minutes (Finale - Episode 526)

Original release
- Network: Formosa Television
- Release: 22 September 2004 – 28 September 2006

Related
- Desire for Life; Eternal Happiness

The Unforgettable Memory is a Taiwanese prime-time television series, originally broadcast on Formosa Television from 22 September 2004 to 28 September 2006 for 526 episodes. With a run-time of over 50,000 minutes, it is the longest Taiwanese TV drama in the 21st century.

== Cast ==
Wang Shengtian is the main protagonist in this drama. Villains include Huang Kunshan, Cai Jinpao, Du Wenjie, Wu Pinde and many others.

=== Wangs ===
Cast	Role	Character / Relationship / Career	Career/Status	Episodes appeared
Jason Wang (Wang Shih-hsien) (王識賢)	Wang Qingyun 王青雲	Wang-Chen Yuexia's husband Father of Wang Shengtian and Wang Shengzhi	Famous for carving statues of Guan Yu He appeared only in episode 13. Flashbacks in episode 65 show he was killed by Huang Kunshan in Japan.	13, 65
Jason Wang (Wang Shih-hsien) (王識賢)	Wang Shengtian 王勝天	Protagonist; Son of Wang Qingyun and Wang-Chen Yuexia; Fang Lizhu's husband Wang Shengzhi's elder brother Father of Wang Tianzhu	One of the market leaders of the electronics industry and top 50 companies in Taiwan He stopped schooling at an early age to support his family as a pier labourer and then an employee in Huang Kunshan's timber factory. Founded Tiancheng Enterprise with Lizhu in Episode 33 in a timber factory as General Manager and subsequently Chairman before expanding into shipping, healthcare, construction, real estate and electronics over the next few decades. He found out that Huang Kunshan was his father's murderer in episode 70. Previously faced a business crisis after Kunshan and Dazhong cheated Tiancheng Enterprise funds and causing Lizhu to be jailed. Became successful after buying Dazhong's shares in the urban planning project which turned out to be a success. Relocated Tiancheng Enterprise to Taipei in episode 122 in order to search for Lizhu and Tianzhu. Founded Tianzhu Hospital in Episode 127 and became its Chairman cum interim CEO in order to fulfil Lizhu's wishes. In episode 141, Shengtian travelled with Lizhu and Tianzhu. His role as Tianzhu Hospital's interim CEO was succeeded by Gao Maoxiong in episode 146. Disbanded most departments in Tiancheng Enterprise and focused more on the electronics industry to help Shengzhi repay his debts worth TWD$1 billion in episode 179. He married Lizhu in episode 195 after numerous obstacles in their relationship and was later divorced in episode 347. Had his company listed on the stock exchange in episode 247. Shengtian and Tianzhu met again in episode 422. Shengtian and Lizhu remarried in episode 520. Retired as the Chairman of Tiancheng Enterprise before passing the baton to Tianzhu in episode 525. In the finale, Shengtian had overcome brain cancer and in the end, both he and Lizhu travelled around the world by boat.	1-363, 373-386 and 409-526
Zhang Qin	Wang-Chen Yuexia 陳月霞	Old Madam Wang; Wang Qingyun's wife Mother of Wang Shengtian and Wang Shengzhi; Mother-in-law of Lai Lizhu and Lai Suling	Grand matriarch of the Wang Family Widowed at a young age after Qingyun was murdered by Huang Kunshan Worked as a vegetable farmer to raise Shengtian and Shengzhi Favoring male offsprings over female offsprings Previously diagnosed with stroke and kidney failure. Used to look down on Lizhu's bar hostess background due to her husband's past encounter which indirectly caused his death and objected to Shengtian and Lizhu's wedding. Regretted her actions after losing Lizhu and Tianzhu when Suling gave birth to Yuting and tried to get mother and son back into the Wang family.	2-228, 237-390, 396-399, 403-406, 409, 413-418, 425-431, 440-441, 449, 457, 469-491, 494, 497, 499, 501, 504-526
Chang Feng-shu	Fang/Lai Lizhu	Adopted daughter of Fang Jinchuan and Xiazi; Biological daughter of Lai Tianyou and Chen Liqing Huang Kunshan's niece Huang Xuelian's cousin Wang Shengtian's wife Lai Suling's elder sister Mother of Wang Tianzhu	Former top bar hostess of Xiao Nan Guo's pub who subsequently transformed the pub into a nostalgic restaurant. Founded Tiancheng Enterprise with Shengtian in episode 33 as Chairman and subsequently Deputy Chairman In episode 34, Lizhu bore Shengtian's son. In episode 79, she was jailed for 3 years after being framed by Huang Kunshan, and later was bailed out in episode 104. She gave birth to Tianzhu in episode 89. She and Tianzhu left quietly in episode 113 in order not to let Shengtian continue being stuck between her and Old Madam Wang. She established a property agency firm in episode 122 and disbanded the company in episode 179. She and Shengtian met again in episode 135. She thought of the care Shengtian brought in episode 140. In episode 141, Lizhu travelled with Shengtian and Tianzhu. She and Tianzhu returned to Taiwan in episode 164. She learned of her biological parents in episode 186, and therefore acknowledged them in episode 191. She was elected as Chairman of Bo-ai Hospital in episode 208, replacing Lai Suling's role. She married Shengtian in episode 195 and was later divorced in episode 347. She returned in episode 467 after the divorce 120 episodes earlier. Lizhu and Shengtian remarried again in episode 520. In the finale, both Shengtian and her travelled around the world by boat.	1-148, 164-348, 467-508, 512-526
Younger: Qiu Guanlong and later Ge Jiahong; Older: Xie Chengjun	Wang Tianzhu	Son of Wang Shengtian and Lai Lizhu; Chen Shanni's husband Li Jiajia's former husband Fat Cat's friend	He was born in episode 89 in prison He and his mother Lizhu returned to Taiwan in episode 164. Former Canadian university graduate and made his appearance in the older version in episode 214. Started his career as a security guard in Tiancheng Enterprise. He married Shanni in episode 316. He lost the takeover of the Cai's bank shares through a gambling set-up by Du Wenjie and Anlun in episode 370. Tianzhu and his father Shengtian met again in episode 422. He divorced with Shanni in episode 428. He was appointed the General Manager of Tianlei Enterprise in episode 440. He married Jiajia in episode 490 and was later divorced in episode 515. Tianzhu and Shanni remarried again in episode 520. He was appointed the Chairman of Tiancheng Enterprise in episode 525.	The younger version appeared in episodes 123-148 and later episodes 164–212. The older version appeared in episodes 214–382 and returned in episodes 389–526.
Angel Han (Han Yu) (韓瑜)	Huang Xuelian	Lin Dazhong's fiancée Daughter of Huang Kunshan Fang/Lai Lizhu's cousin Lai Tianyou and Chen Liqing's niece	Former Schoolteacher and secretary of Tiancheng Enterprise She was knocked down by a car in episode 20 arranged by Lin Tonghai's men in order to stop the wedding between her and Dazhong. She was shot by Quanshui by accident during the election campaign in episode 55. In episode 94, She and Dazhong were getting engaged. An episode later, she died by jumping off a cliff after discovering Kunshan's past misdeeds.	1-95
Angel Han (Han Yu) (韓瑜)	Chen Shanni	Daughter of Yu Guangrong and Chen Yujie; Wang Tianzhu's wife	She appeared from episodes 233–508 and later episodes 514–526. She married Tianzhu in episode 316 and was later divorced in episode 428. She made suicide attempts in episode 491. Shanni and Tianzhu remarried again in episode 520.	
Lee Lee-zen	Wang Shengzhi	Lai Suling's husband Adopted father of Wang Yuting; Son of Wang Qingyun and Wang-Chen Yuexia; Younger brother of Wang Shengtian	Lawyer-turned-businessman Former GM of Tiancheng Enterprise He appeared in episodes 1–342. He married Suling in episode 85. Established an investment firm in episode 116 which is used by Cai Jinpao for the purpose of money laundering. Found out about Yuting's true parentage in episode 172 after she met into an accident. He divorced with Suling in order not to implicate her for his mounting debts in episode 178 and patched up in episode 195. Founded Tianma Enterprise in episode 204 with electronics as its core business together with his original investment firm, construction, property development and law firms as subsidiaries and had it listed on the stock exchange in episode 240, earning him the nickname of "Taiwan's King of Stocks". Went into financial crisis after Yang Jianzhi sabotaged Tianma Enterprise. He made suicide attempts in episode 289 in losing his wife three episodes after her death. He married Peiqi in episode 338. He died in episode 342 after being shot by Cai Jinpao's men.	
Yang Baowei	Lai Suling	Wang Shengzhi's wife Lin Dazhong's former wife Wang Yuting's mother Daughter of Lai Tianyou and Chen Liqing; Lai Lizhu's younger sister	She appeared in episodes 1-286. She married Dazhong in episode 36 and was later divorced in episode 77. She married Shengzhi in episode 85. She gave birth to Yuting in episode 118. She became the Chairman of Tianzhu Hospital in episode 170 and subsequently changed the hospital's name to Bo-ai Hospital. Divorced with Shengzhi in episode 178 and patched up in episode 195. Hired an assassin to kill Dazhong in episode 183. She was ousted by Lizhu as the Bo-ai Hospital's Chairman in episode 208. She died in episode 286 after suffering an asthma attack and her inhaler kicked away by Cai Jinpao	
Younger: Fu Peici; Older: Jeannie Hsieh	Wang Yuting	Nicknamed as 'Tingting'; Li Wenhua's wife Daughter of Lin Dazhong and Lai Suling; Adopted daughter of Wang Shengzhi	The younger version appeared from episodes 123–212. She was born in episode 118. Met into an accident in episode 172 and her parentage as Lin Dazhong's biological daughter was revealed. She returned as the older version in episodes 215-315 and later episodes 329-505. She recovered her memory in episode 402. Diagnosed with leukemia in episode 438. She married Jianzhi in episode 485. She died from leukemia in episode 505.	
Wang Can	Li Wenhua	Wang Yuting's husband One of Tianzhu-Bo'ai General Hospital's doctors	He appeared in episodes 297–315 and later 329-406. Suffering from mental illness He had committed suicide in episode 406.	

=== Lais ===
Cast	Role	Character / Relationship / Career	Episodes appeared / Status
Shi Ying	Lai Tianyou	Chen Liqing's husband Father of Lai Lizhu and Lai Suling	Retired businessman and Speaker of Chiayi City Council Former chairman of Chiayi's Credit Union. Founder of a local hospital in Chiayi Major shareholder of Tianzhu Hospital He appeared in episodes 1–212 and later 266–505. Invested in Shengtian when he started Tiancheng Enterprise as a timber factory He married Liqing in episode 60. He and Liqing acknowledged Xiuhui as their daughter in episode 52 but turned out to be a scam in episode 157 as it was actually arranged by Lin Tonghai to cheat the Lai's assets. He accompanied Liqing to the hospital in episode 127. He and Liqing acknowledged Lizhu as their daughter and Xiuhui as god-daughter in episode 191.
Gao Xinxin	Chen Liqing	Lai Tianyou's wife Mother of Lai Lizhu	Former bar hostess and lady boss of Xiao Nan Guo's pub She appeared in episodes 2–197. She married Tianyou in episode 60. She and Tianyou acknowledged Xiuhui as their daughter in episode 52 but turned out to be a scam in episode 157 as it was actually arranged by Lin Tonghai to cheat the Lai's family assets. She was rushed to the hospital in episode 127. Diagnosed with terminal stage liver cancer in episode 162 with only a year to live. She and Tianyou acknowledged Lizhu as their daughter and Xiuhui as god-daughter in episode 191. She died in episode 197 due to liver cancer.
Chang Feng-shu	Fang/Lai Lizhu	See Wangs.	
Yang Baowei	Lai Suling	See Wangs.	

=== Huangs ===
Cast	Role	Character / Relationship / Career	Episodes appeared
Michael Huang	Huang Kunshan/Huang Junxiong	Former owner of a timber factory Tiancheng Enterprise employee Father of Huang Xuelian	He appeared in episodes 1-109. Wang Shengtian's former boss in his timber factory, business partner when Shengtian started Tiancheng Enterprise, and subsequently became his employee after being bankrupt. He survived a gunshot during a temple procession and his factory was set on fire by Cai Jinpao's men in episode 3. He went bankrupt after losing the competition with Cai Jinpao for the election into Chiayi City Council as a councilor in episode 56. He murdered Wang Qingyun in Japan in a flashback of episode 65. He found out that Shengtian was Qingyun's son in episode 60 and started to plot against Shengtian and Lizhu in an attempt to cover his misdeeds. Collaborate with Dazhong and framed Lizhu for smuggling which causes her to be jailed in episode 79. Indirectly caused Xuelian's death when his past misdeeds have been exposed in episode 95. He was jailed for 10 years after being betrayed by Dazhong in episode 107 and transferred to Lüdao Prison 2 episodes later.
Han Yu	Huang Xuelian	See Wangs.	

=== Lis and Sus ===
Cast	Role	Character / Relationship / Career	Episodes appeared / Status
Li Xinwen	Li Quanshui	Nicknamed as 'Ah Shui' Su Yuefong and Su Yuehong's husband Li Aiyu's brother	He appeared in all the episodes. Former pier labourer and employee of Kunshan's timber factory. Owner of a sand and gravel quarry and general contractor firm. He was jailed in episode 2 after being betrayed by Cai Jinpao. Joined Cai Jinpao's gang after falling out with Shengtian in episode 31. In episode 44, he and Yuefong settled their conditions. He was jailed for the second time for shooting Xuelian by accident in episode 59. Quanshui and Yuefong met again in episode 127. He was jailed for the third time for 12 years in episode 213 for shooting Xiaozhen in an attempt to seek revenge on Cai Jinpao. He married Yuehong in episode 296.
Chen Ruoping	Su Yuefong	Li Quanshui's wife Su Yuehong's sister	She appeared in episodes 1-53 and returned in episodes 123-168. Former bar hostess of Xiao Nan Guo's pub Owner of a flower store In episode 44, she and Quanshui settled their conditions. She was rolled down a cliff in episode 53 and was presumed dead. She re-appeared in episode 123 and it was revealed that she went blind after being rolled down from a cliff and later sold flowers for a living in Taipei. Yuefong and Quanshui met again in episode 127. Regained her sight in episode 165. She died in episode 168 with her unborn baby to rescue Quanshui from being shot by Elephant Lin.
Yue Hong	Su Yuehong	Li Quanshui's wife Su Yuefong's younger sister	She appeared in episodes 232–498. She married Quanshui in episode 296. She died in episode 498 to rescue Aiyu from being shot by Du Wenjie.
De Xin	Li Aiyu	Nicknamed as 'Ah Yu' Cai Jianpao's former wife Mother of Cai Zhiying Li Quanshui's half-younger sister	She appeared in episodes 38–517. She was saved by Cai Jinpao from a brothel in Taipei in episode 38. She married Jinpao in episode 88. She gave birth to Zhiying in episode 122. She was nominated as a legislator of Taipei City 2nd Constituency in episode 214, replacing Jinpao's role. She divorced Jinpao in episode 377. She lost her position as a legislator in episode 484 after serving 4 terms. She was jailed in episode 517 on corruption charges.

=== Fangs ===
Cast	Role	Character / Relationship / Career	Episodes appeared / Status
Tang Chuan	Fang Jinchuan	Xia Zi's husband Father of Fang Lijun; Adopted father of Lai Lizhu	Security guard in Tianzhu Hospital Lives in Yilan City with his family until Lizhu bought an apartment in Taipei and relocate there. He appeared from episode 113 until episode 214 when it was mentioned that he died.
Xiao Hui	Xia Zi/Ah Mei	Fang Jinchuan's wife Mother of Fang Lijun; Adopted mother of Lai Lizhu	A habitual gambler Lizhu's babysitter before she took her away from her biological parents and adopted her. She appeared in episodes 113–217. She told Lizhu who her biological parents were in episode 186.
Gao Yuzhen	Fang Lijun	Gao Maoxiong's wife Daughter of Fang Jinchuan and Xiazi; One of Tianzhu-Bo'ai General Hospital's persons-in-charge	She appeared in episodes 113–214 and later episodes 355–406.
Huang Yingxun	Gao Maoxiong	Fang Lijun's husband Lin Xiuhui's former husband One of Tianzhu-Bo'ai General Hospital's doctors	He appeared in episodes 127–214. An unethical cardiologist. He was elected CEO of Tianzhu Hospital in episode 146 and his position replaced by Li Qianhui in episode 170. Reinstated his position after Qianhui resigned in episode 182. He engaged with Xiuhui in episode 148 and was later married in episode 155. Introduced heart medicine sold by Dazhong's pharmaceutical firm that caused serious side effects in patients His unethical medical practices were exposed in episode 196. Divorced with Xiuhui in episode 198.

=== Lins ===
Cast	Role	Character / Relationship / Career	Episodes appeared / Status
Lin Zhaoxiong	Lin Tonghai	Father of Lin Dazhong and Lin Xiuhui	He appeared in episodes 26-83, episodes 158 and 159 and episodes 193-198. Original major shareholder of an urban planning project in Chiayi before passing his shares to Dazhong after going bankrupt. Lai Tianyou and Huang Kunshan's rival when his wife was murdered by underground leaders in Japan after taking the rap for Kunshan. Forced Dazhong to marry Suling and lied to Tianyou and Liqing that Xiuhui is their biological daughter in order to cheat the Lais' assets. Returned to Japan in episode 83 and reappeared in episodes 158-159 while being confronted by Tianyou and Liqing about their biological daughter's whereabouts. Found out about Dazhong's death and returned to Taiwan to pay his last respects while at the same time regretting about imparting wrong values in disciplining Dazhong as a boy, not knowing that Suling was the mastermind to his murder.
Liu Zhihan	Lin Dazhong	Lai Suling's former husband Huang Xuelian's fiancé Biological father of Wang Yuting; Son of Lin Tonghai; Lin Xiuhui's elder brother	He appeared in episodes 6-108 and returned later in episodes 124–183. He saved Shengtian in episode 6 after the latter was beaten up by Cai Jinpao's gang and thrown off the car. Inherited Tonghai's shares in the urban planning project Former chairman of Chiayi's Credit Union and had his position replaced by Cai Jinpao after he misappropriated the Credit Union funds to make up for the losses incurred in the stock market while at the same time, giving up the shares of the urban planning project to Shengtian. He married Suling in episode 36 and was later divorced in episode 77. In episode 94, he and Xuelian were getting engaged. He went to Japan in episode 108 after cheating Huang Kunshan's ill-gotten money. He returned to Taiwan as Chairman of Taiwan's branch of a Japanese-based pharmaceutical company in episode 124. Contracted heart disease after his job was replaced in episode 180. Killed by Suling's hired assassin in episode 183.
Ye Huan	Li Qianhui	Lin Dazhong's fiancée	She appeared in episodes 158–239 and returned later in episodes 384–496. Former plastic surgeon in Japan She was elected CEO of Tianzhu Hospital in episode 170 and resigned in episode 182. Returned to Tianzhu Hospital in episode 197 as CEO.
Chiang Tsu-ping	Lin Xiuhui	Gao Maoxiong's former wife Daughter of Lin Tonghai; Lin Dazhong's younger sister	She appeared in episodes 36–108 and returned later in episodes 127–207. Former Deputy Chairman of Tiancheng Enterprise Former Deputy CEO and director of Tianzhu Hospital; She happened to be one of the guests of Dazhong's wedding in episode 36. In episode 80, she found out that she is not the real daughter of Lai Tianyou and Chen Liqing but as Lin Tonghai's illegitimate daughter. She knew about Xuelian's death in episode 95, and handed the evidence to the judge in episode 104. She engaged with Maoxiong in episode 148 and was later married in episode 155. Found out about Maoxiong's unfaithfulness shortly after their wedding and filed for divorce in episode 155. In episode 157, the secret of her not being Lai Tianyou and Chen Liqing's daughter has been exposed. She became Lai Tianyou and Chen Liqing's god-daughter in episode 191. Divorced with Maoxiong in episode 198. Returned to Japan in episode 207 after futile attempts in investigating Dazhong's death, not knowing that Suling was the mastermind.

=== Cais ===
Cast	Role	Character / Relationship / Career	Episodes appeared / Status
Hsu Heng	Cai Jinpao	Yang Shuzhen's husband Li Aiyu's former husband Father of Yang Jianzhi (Cai Zhiming) and Cai Zhiying	He appeared in almost all the episodes. Former underground leader Using underhanded means to win the elections into the City Council He was elected as a councilor of Chiayi City Council in episode 56. He was elected as Speaker of Chiayi City Council in episode 73. He married Aiyu in episode 88. Chairman of Chiayi's Credit Union and subsequently transformed it into a bank with business interests in a sand and gravel quarry and contractor firm. He was nominated as a legislator of Taipei City 2nd Constituency in Legislative Yuan in episode 122. He was sentenced to death and subsequently life imprisonment on appeal in episode 214 for claiming numerous lives and lost his legislator position. He was released after 15 years in prison in episode 217. Suffers from serious liver problems but kept in the dark from Yuehong; eventually turns cirrhosis and liver cancer when Yuehong locked him up and made him drink excessively, failing to resist alcoholism (episodes 261-262) He kicked away Suling's inhaler when she suffered an asthma attack, causing her death in episode 286. Recovered from cancer after receiving Wenbing's liver in episode 299. Had someone to impersonate a police officer and shot Shengzhi to death in episode 342 and indirectly caused the divorce between Shengtian and Lizhu. His feud with the Wangs also indirectly led to Niuniu accidentally shot by Quanshui (episode 345) and Elephant's death by Yuehong's men for trying to save him (episode 349). Lost control of his bank to the Wangs and eventually the Dus when the shares were cheated by the Dus making Tianzhu gamble in episodes 369-370. Turns over a new leaf (in episode 375) after facing a near-death experience of being battered by Du Wenjie following a confrontation in episode 373. He later divorced Aiyu two episodes later. Discovered that Wenbing was still alive while camping outside Anlun and Niuniu's wedding site in episode 392. Nearly killed by Wenbing who seeks revenge but was saved by Jianzhi in episode 393. Went with Yuting to meet Shengzhi's and Suling's tablet in episode 407, where he sought forgiveness, knelt down and kowtowed before them. He went to seek atonement from the Wangs for Shengzhi's and Suling's deaths in episode 411. Surrendered himself to the police in relation to Shengzhi and Suling's death in episode 414, later released on bail Acquitted of murder at first instance in episode 428 due to lack of evidence In episode 436, he loaned his remaining assets to Shengtian to help him survive a financial crisis, and was knocked down by a van while rescuing Yuting from a car accident. After receiving Mai Guochuan's blood donation and recovered, Yuting withdrew her appeal against him in episode 437; Reconciled with Aiyu in episode 494 after she was forced to give up her assets in a trap set up by Du Wenjie; Following a prison visit to meet Aiyu and having some drinks where they chased off some young hooligans, he apologised to Quanshui for causing Yuefeng's death in episode 520. In episode 523, during his son's wedding, he left the site to rescue Shengtian from Wu Pinde's custody and ended up getting shot.
Li Yating	Yang Shuzhen	Cai Jinpao's wife Mother of Yang Jianzhi	She appeared in episodes 98-526. She single-handledly raised Cai Zhiming by selling noodles in Gukeng Left Gukeng with Zhiming after Jinpao's conviction in episode 214 and had his name changed to Yang Jianzhi.
Younger: Lin Yanchen; Older: Mike Lee	Yang Jianzhi; Cai Zhiming	Mai Yatong's husband Son of Cai Jinpao and Yang Shuzhen; Cai Zhiying's half brother	The younger version appeared in episode 98–214. He returned as the older version in episode 224–526. Had a heart transplant He was employed in Tianma Enterprise as a legal consultant to sabotage Shengzhi and Tianma Enterprise for causing Cai Jinpao's jail term. His identity of Cai Zhiming was exposed in Episode 267 while registering his wedding with Yuting. He engaged with Yatong in episode 414. He married Yuting in episode 485. He later married Yatong in episode 523.
Liu Yue	Mai Yatong	Yang Jianzhi's primary school classmate and wife Daughter of Mai Guochuan and Zhang Huilin; Angie's friend	She appeared in episodes 380–526. She engaged with Jianzhi in episode 414; Caused Yuting's death (in episode 505) as a result of flu infection after jumping into the sea for chasing the Dus in episode 503. Assisted Lei Guang with the management of Tianlei temporarily after his second arrest following Du Wenjie's death, until he was bailed out. Married Jianzhi in episode 523.
Younger: Gan Yongwei and later Huang Jie; Older: Ye Jiayu	Cai Zhiying	Nicknamed "Niu Niu"; Jiang Wenbing's wife Du Anlun's former wife Daughter of Cai Jianpao and Li Aiyu; Yang Jianzhi (Cai Zhiming)'s half sister	Owner of a fashion stall and former chairman of the Cais' contractor firm She was born in episode 122. She appeared as the younger version in episodes 122–214. She returned as the older version in episodes 219–513. She married Wenbing in episode 299. She later married Anlun in episode 392. She and Wenbing met again in episode 409, and later divorced Anlun in episode 424.
An Dingya	Jiang Wenbing	Cai Zhiying's husband	He appeared in episodes 230–319. He married Zhiying in episode 299. He jumped down the sea in episode 319, causing him to be missing. He returned in episodes 388–508. He and Zhiying met again in episode 409. He was shot by Du Wenjie in episode 507, died in hospital in episode 508.

=== Lins () ===
Cast	Role	Character / Relationship / Career	Episodes appeared / Status
Mi Jiang	Elephant Lin	Hee's husband Father of Tarzan Lin	Cai Jinpao's buddy Shot Yuefong and her unborn baby to death in episode 168. He was sentenced to a 20-year jail term in episode 213 and was released at least seven years prior to the events in episode 215 as an employee in a valet parking company. He appeared from episode 1 and was later killed in episode 349 to save Cai Jianpao from being killed by Su Yuehong's men.
	Hee	Elephant Lin's wife Mother of Tarzan Lin	She appeared in episodes 255, 259, in episode 349 when Elephant died, and episode 431 when Mai Guochuan seeks her out to be a witness for Yuting's suit against Cai Jinpao.
Lin Guanyu	Tarzan Lin	Son of Elephant Lin and Hee	He appeared in episodes 255, 259 and in episode 349 when Elephant died.

=== Mais ===
Cast	Role	Character / Relationship / Career	Episodes appeared / Status
Lin Tzay-peir	Mai Guochuan	Zhang Huilin's husband Father of Mai Yatong	Retired court judge in charge of Cai Jinpao's lawsuit He appeared in episode 195, making his return in episodes 415–524. He remarried Huilin in episode 523.
Zhang Qiongzi	Zhang Huilin	Mai Guochuan's wife Mother of Mai Yatong	She appeared in episodes 415–524. She remarried Guochuan in episode 523.
Liu Yue	Mai Yatong	See Cais.	

=== Dus ===
Cast	Role	Character / Relationship / Career	Episodes appeared / Status
Li Luo	Du Wenjie	Father of Du Anlun	He appeared from episode 351 till episode 508 where he died. Collaborated with Anlun to make Tianzhu gamble away the Cais' bank shares in episode 370. Secretly assisted Buffalo in drug trafficking when the latter needed money to restore the funds he embezzled from Lei Guang's businesses, and later worked with Buffalo resulting in the stabbing Lei Guang's back with a knife in episode 422; Bought over 10% shares of Tiancheng Enterprises from He Peiqi in episode 425 through Li Jiajia, thus replacing He Peiqi as Tiancheng Enterprises' board member. Sent the photos of Wenbing and Zhiying's adultery to the magazine publisher without Anlun's knowledge, in a bit to reduce Aiyu's popularity at the ballot Set up a trap for Aiyu to make her liable to him in debts, captured her while she attempt to flee and forced her to give her construction and quarry business to him in episodes 491-492; Through Wu Pinde, he discovered that He Peiqi and Nie Chaofeng planned to betray him, and he knocked Nie Chaofeng unconscious (but failed to kill him) in episode 493. Forced to surrender Aiyu's construction and quarry business to Quanshui after being surrounded and battered by Lei Guang's men in episode 495; Captured, tortured and forced to surrender all assets to Nie Chaofeng and He Peiqi, before being trapped in a car and rushed into the sea in episode 496; Shot and kill Yuehong after abducting her and Aiyu and luring Quanshui to witness her death in episode 498; Unable to get his hands on Quanshui's assets due to Lizhu's interference, he worked with Yu Guangrong to launder his remaining assets from Shanghai in episode 499. Was strangled by Tianzhu, Wenbing and Lei Guang's men at the spa in episode 502, later held Shanni and Jiajia hostage in front of Tianzhu. Was shot by Wu Pinde after a failed confrontation with Nie Chaofeng, later jumped into the sea in episode 503. Returned in episode 507 where he took advantage of Cai Jinpao's kindness and shoot him. Later in the episode, while waiting for Yu Guangrong, he was subjected to a series of torment and battering from Quanshui, Tianzhu, Wenbing and Lei Guang's men. When Zhiying appeared during the confrontation, he held her hostage and used it to his advantage to shoot Quanshui in his leg and Wenbing multiple times. With his attention away from Wenbing while hugging Alan, he was badly shot by Wenbing in burst-fire mode and died eventually in episode 508, asking Wang Jiayi to take care of his son.
Fu Zichun	Du Anlun	Son of Du Wenjie; Wang Jiayi's husband Cai Zhiying's former husband Nice; Also villianic	He appeared in episode 352–471. Collaborated with his father to make Tianzhu gamble away the Cais' bank shares in episode 370. In episode 375, with Alice, they set up a fairy jump trap for Tianzhu to force the Wangs not to take back the Cais' bank shares which were found to be obtained through fraud. He married Zhiying in episode 392. Attempted to privately rescue Zhiying from Lei Guang by lending Buffalo the construction licence, but was foiled by Du Wenjie in episode 408; Brought the police to Tianzhu's apartment and took pictures of Wenbing and Zhiying in bed in episode 419, causing Jianzhi to give up his remaining shares in the Cais' bank to the Dus in exchange for them not suing Wenbing and Zhiying. He divorced Zhiying five episodes later, but refused to get over this relationship. Colluded with Buffalo to frame Wenbing for drug trafficking in episode 433 in order to secure Wenbing's arrest but failed as a result of Lei Guang's interference, causing Wenbing to be kicked out from Lei Guang's side. Went to save Buffalo from being killed by Lei Guang's men in episode 435 after the collusion was exposed, and was shot in the arm by Lei Guang in the process. Caused Lei Guang to be shot by Buffalo and hospitalised, and indirectly causing Buffalo to be killed by Tianzhu in self-defense in episode 437. He was once again shot in the arm by Tianzhu in the same episode. Was badly injured by Tianzhu after he broke the rules in a boxing match with Wenbing in episode 442. He has to go to America for health treatment in episode 471. Returned to Taiwan in episode 495 where he was captured by He Peiqi and Nie Chaofeng, who turned against Du Wenjie for his betrayal. Was rescued by Wang Jiayi in episode 497 and later reunited with Du Wenjie. Was abducted by Lei Guang's men and Quanshui while waiting for Yu Guangrong in episode 507, during a trap planned by Lei Guang and Quanshui; Convinced Zhiying into her senses for blaming everyone (including Tianzhu) in Wenbing's death, leading to her attempted suicide in episode 513; After slashing He Peiqi but failing to kill her for her role in Jiayi's purported death by Wu Pinde's hands, he was forced to be on the run in episode 521. He married Jiayi in episode 525. An episode later in the finale, he was arrested by the police for murdering Wu Pinde.
Shine Zhang	Wang Jiayi	Du Anlun's wife Wu Pinde's girlfriend	She appeared from episodes 458–526. She married Anlun in episode 525. An episode later in the finale, she was shot. But not dead yet.

=== Lis ===
Cast	Role	Character / Relationship / Career	Episodes appeared / Status
Zhang Yonghua	Li Jiyao	Director Li; Father of He Peiqi	He appeared in episodes 1–102, making his return in episodes 294–316.
Kuang Mingjie	He Peiqi	Daughter of Li Jiyao	She appeared in episodes 289–526. She married Shengzhi in episode 338. She was chased out of the Wangs in episode 425.

=== Lis (not again) ===
Cast	Role	Character / Relationship / Career	Episodes appeared / Status
Cui Haoran	Li Shimin	Father of Li Jiajia	He appeared in episodes 119–148, later episodes 308–369 and episodes 513–526.
Younger: Shi Yuyan; Older: Qiu Qiwen	Li Jiajia	Daughter of Li Shimin; Chen Shanni's rival in love	The younger version appeared in episodes 123-148. She returned as the older version in episodes 311–370 and later episodes 409-526. She was raped by Director Zhao in episode 368. She married Tianzhu in episode 490 and was later divorced in episode 515. She died giving birth to Wang Tianzhu's son from a heart condition in the final episode.

=== Chens ===
Cast	Role	Character / Relationship / Career	Episodes appeared / Status
Zhang Mingjie	Yu Guangrong	Investment Guru Shi Liwen's husband Chen Yujie's former husband Father of Chen Shanni	He appeared from episode 250 till episode 274 where he and Liwen returned to America. He returned in episodes 486-526.
Chao Yung-hsin	Chen Yujie	Yu Guangrong's former wife Mother of Chen Shanni	She appeared from episode 245 till episode 274 where she died.
Li Fangwen	Shi Liwen	Yu Guangrong's wife Stepmother of Chen Shanni	She appeared from episodes 253 till episode 274 where she and Guangrong returned to America.
Han Yu	Chen Shanni	See Wangs.	

=== Xus ===
Cast	Role	Character / Relationship / Career	Episodes appeared / Status
Chen Yufeng	Xu Kunliang	Court Prosecutor Xu Xiaozhen's Brother	He appeared from episodes 150 till episode 203 where he was shot and killed by Cai Jinpao.
Lü Minzhen	Xu Xiaozhen	Liao Shuiwa's wife Xu Kunliang's younger sister	She appeared in episodes 159–214, making her return in episodes 234 and 235.
Chen Ziqiang	Liao Shuiwa	Xu Xiaozhen's husband	He appeared from episodes 24 till episode 234 where he saved Zhao Wuxiong from being shot by Jiang Wenbing.

=== Tiancheng Enterprise ===
Cast	Role	Character / Relationship / Career	Episodes appeared / Status
Wang Shih-hsien	Wang Shengtian	See Wangs.	
Chang Feng-shu	Fang/Lai Lizhu	See Wangs.	
Xie Chengjun	Wang Tianzhu	See Wangs.	
Han Yu	Chen Shanni	See Wangs.	
Li Liren	Wang Shengzhi	See Wangs.	
Li Xinwen	Li Quanshui	See Sus.	See Sus.
Qiu Qiwen	Li Jiajia	See Lis (not again).	See Lis (not again).

=== Tianying Enterprise ===
Cast	Role	Character / Relationship / Career	Episodes appeared
Xie Chengjun	Wang Tianzhu	See Wangs.	
Han Yu	Chen Shanni	See Wangs.	
Li Zhenying	Yang Jianzhi; Cai Zhiming	See Cais.	
Sun Zhiyu	Sun Jie	One of Tianying Enterprise's part-time persons-in-charge	He appeared in episodes 414–468.
Chen Baicun	Ken	One of Tianying Enterprise's part-time persons-in-charge	He appeared only in episode 419.

=== Tianlei Enterprise ===
Cast	Role	Character / Relationship / Career	Episodes appeared / Status
Lin Yifang	Lei Guang	Nie Chaofeng's sworn brother Power of secret societies to help bond friendship Lei Gong befriended Wang Tianzhu, Yang Jianzhi, Xiaomai, Yuehong and many others. He also let Wang Tianzhu hand over Tianlei.	He appeared in episodes 389–526. In episodes 391-392, he sent Wenbing to kill a rival gang leader who worked with Du Wenjie over a business venture in Shanghai. Decided to participate in Haigang City's construction tender on Tianzhu's advice in order to oppose Du Wenjie. Through Buffalo, he kidnapped Niuniu in episode 405 to force the Dus to lend him a construction licence for the tender, which succeeded in episode 409.
Nie Bingxian	Nie Chaofeng	Lei Guang's sworn brother Nie Jiangtian's brother	He appeared from episode 447 till episode 518 where he was killed by Wu Pinde's men. He has epilepsy.
Jiang Zhong	Nie Jiangtian	Nicknamed as 'Buffalo'; Nie Chaofeng's younger brother	He appeared from episode 389 till episode 437 where he was accidentally killed by Wang Tianzhu.
Ding Liqi	Wu Pinde	Nicknamed as 'De'; Wang Jiayi's boyfriend	He appeared from episode 440 till episode 526 where he died.
Zhang Fengshuo	Bao	One of Wu Pinde's men and brother	He appeared in episode 439-525.
Jiang Yi	Tarzan	One of Lei Guang's men and brother	He appeared in episodes 436−514.
Yue Hong	Su Yuehong	See Sus.	See Sus.
Liu Yue	Mai Yatong	See Cais.	

== Music ==
=== Theme Song ===
Song title	Performer
情難忘 (Episode 1-83)	Wang Shih-hsien
出外人 (Episode 84-103)	Chan Ya-wen
擔輸贏 (Episode 104-133)	Jody Chiang
堅持 (Episode 134-212)	Weng Li-you
愛你的代價 (Episode 213-282)	Gao Xiangpeng and Feng Rui'e
雪中花 (Episode 283-312)	Wang Shih-hsien and Sun Shu-may
無人來作伴 (Episode 313-347)	Lin Shan and Weng Li-you
愛了無後悔 (Episode 348-447)	Long Qianyu and Weng Li-you
愛伊希地魯 (Episode 448-526)	Weng Li-you

=== Ending Songs ===
Song title	Performer
雲中月圓 (Episode 1-60)	Wang Shih-hsien and Sun Shu-may
昨夜星辰 (Episode 61-73)	Yao Xinying
意難忘 (Episode 74-173)	Tsai Hsiao-hu
真愛只有你 (Episode 174-277)	Lin Shan and Fu Zhenhui
無人來作伴 (Episode 278-312)	Lin Shan and Weng Liyou
風中的玫瑰 (Episode 313-417)	Long Qianyu
今生最愛的人 (Episode 418-525)	Tsai Hsiao-hu

== Viewership in Taiwan ==
The Unforgettable Memory has the distinction of being the longest primetime drama ever in Taiwan history, with a total of 526 episodes produced. It has the highest viewership of all TV shows in Taiwan when it debuted at primetime on September 22, 2004 till its ending on September 28, 2006 almost daily (hitting above 10). It was rerun again at 6.00–7.00 pm from July 5, 2010 and lasted until 2014.

== Overseas reception ==
The series received very good critical response and viewership in other countries too and as of 2009 being shown in Singapore's MediaCorp Channel 8 (in weekday one hour series from June 9, 2006 to October 23, 2009, 4.30–5.30 pm, becoming the longest running drama on Channel 8 in 46 years) rerunning in the pre-dawn hours from Tuesdays to Saturdays 4.00–6.00 am from January 7, 2009 to September 9, 2010, and the third time from 4 October 2010 from Mondays to Thursdays at 10.00 am – 12.00 noon and ended in 2012. Singapore's Channel 8, China's CCTV-8 and Hong Kong's ATV Channel all aired with each episode running 1 hour, with a total of 872 episodes. It has ended its run on Malaysia's Astro Cable Service. The Vietnamese dub "Tình Đầu Khó Phai" was broadcast on THVL Channel and is streamable on YouTube with a total of 767 episodes.

== International broadcast ==
=== Singapore broadcast ===
The series was broadcast on weekdays from 4:30 to 5:30 pm but due to local broadcast laws prohibiting radio or television broadcasts in non-Mandarin Chinese varieties, the show was dubbed into Mandarin when it aired on Singapore's MediaCorp Channel 8, thus making it the first channel to broadcast the show in Mandarin.

=== Taiwan broadcast ===
As of June 2011, the show airs in Taiwan, country of origin of the drama every weeknight at prime time (20:00) with episodes which have ranged in length from 135 to 150 minutes including commercial advertisements. The producers received funding from the Government Information Office to produce the series in high definition. The encore episodes are currently uploading on Formosa Television Drama's Youtube Page.
