= Feng Shui Family =

- Chinese: 風水世家
- Hokkien POJ: Hong‑súi-sè‑ka
- Genre: Romance; Xiangtu; Fengshui; Office Politics; Family
- Directed by: Wang Wei (王為), Liao Fei-hung (廖斐鴻)
- Country of origin: Taiwan
- Original language: Taiwanese Hokkien
- No. of episodes: Taiwan : 426; Other Countries : 1150

Production
- Producers: Lu Hua-pin (呂華濱), Hsiao Ta-lu (蕭大陸)
- Running time: 60-150 minutes

Original release
- Network: Formosa Television
- Release: 17 July 2012 – 5 March 2014

Related
- Father and Son (父與子); Dragon Dance (龍飛鳳舞)

Feng Shui Family (Chinese: 風水世家; Pe̍h-ōe-jī: Hong-suí-sè-ka) is a Taiwanese Hokkien television drama that began airing on Formosa Television in Taiwan on 17 July 2012 to 7 March 2014. The show aired in Taiwan every weeknight at prime time (20:00). The series was one of the longest running Taiwanese television dramas, with 426 episodes.

== Plot ==
This drama depicts the two families turning against one another due to feng shui restrictions set by their ancestors. Under the conflicting pressure of materialism and values, can they lay down their personal views and embrace one another?

== International broadcasts ==
=== Taiwan ===
As of July 2012, the show airs in Taiwan, country of origin of the drama every weeknight at prime time (20:00) with episodes which have ranged in length from 135 to 150 minutes including commercial advertisements. The producers received funding from the Government Information Office to produce the series in high definition. With admiration and some criticism, the show concluded on 17 July 2012, when the brand-new television drama of Formosa Television, Father and Son, was released.

=== Singapore ===
It is currently shown on Singapore's StarHub TV's Channel Hub E City on weekdays at 5 p.m. and repeats at 10.30 a.m. The show was dubbed into Mandarin during the broadcast.

=== Vietnam ===
The Vietnamese dub Phong Thuỷ Thế Gia was broadcast on Vinh Long Television Station Channel (THVL) (Vietnamese: Truyền Hình Vĩnh Long).

== Cast ==
| Actor | Role | Notes |
|---|---|---|
| Mei Fang | Lin Chen Mei-mei | widowed Lin matriarch |
| Ma Ju-feng | Lin Ching-feng | Lin Chen Mei-mei's elder son |
| Liu Hsiu-wen | Wang Shu-nu | Lin Ching-feng's wife |
| Alex Ko | Lin Ming-hsing | Lin Ching-feng's elder son |
| Ricky Chiang | Lin Ming-te | Lin Ching-feng's younger son |
| Chu Xuan | Lin Ming-hui | Lin Ching-feng's daughter |
| Lin Tzay-peir | Lin Ching-shui | Lin Chen Mei-mei's younger son |
| Chao Hsin-yen | Li Yueh-chiao | Lin Ching-shui's wife |
| Lee Hsing-wen | Lin Kuo-hui | Lin Ching-shui's eldest son |
| Cheng Chung-yin | Chang Hsiu-fang | Lin Kuo-hui's wife |
| Jeff Wang | Lin Kuo-ching | Lin Ching-shui's second son |
| Sabrina Pai | Huang Yen-fei | Lin Kuo-ching's wife |
| Fu Tzu-chun | Lin Kuo-hua | Lin Ching-shui's youngest son |
| Wang Tong | Lin Ming-ming | Lin Ching-shui's daughter |

- Chang Shu-wei as Ben, Lin Ming-ming's boyfriend
- Chung Chia-chen as Lin Li-chu, Ben's mother
- Chen Mei-feng as Lin Li-hua, Lin Li-chu's sister
- Su Yen-pei as Tsai Hsiao-ping, Lin Ming-te's girlfriend
- Yu An-shun as Tsai Fu-cheng, Tsai Hsiao-ping's father
- Shara Lin as Ye Chia-yen
- Chang Yung-hua as Ye Tsai-tien, Ye Chia-yen's father
- Chen Sung-young as Chen Yung, Lin Chen Mei-mei's brother
- Wang Chung-huang as Wang Chin-hu
- Chang Chien as Chang Hsiao-chien, Wang Chin-hu's wife
- Eison as Wang You-chiang, Wang Chin-hu's son
- Weng Chia-ming as Chiang Tai-shan
- Kao Chih-hung as Monkey
- Bao Bao as Fatty
- Chang Tsai-Hsing as Hsing
