= Taiwan Tornado =

Taiwanese television series

- Chinese: 台灣龍捲風
- Hokkien POJ: Tâi‑oân-lêng-kńg-hong
- Written by: Lin Gui-Zhi (Head writer); Cheng Wen-Hua; Chen Yu-Wei; Lin Chi-hsiang
- Directed by: Ho Dong-hsing
- Starring: Chen Chao-jung; Yeh Chuan-Chen; Franco Chiang
- Opening theme: "情孤單愛認命" by Chan Ya-Wen
- Ending theme: "風箏" by Long Qianyu "世間人" by Fang Rui'e and Gao Xiang-peng
- Country of origin: Taiwan
- Original languages: Taiwanese Hokkien; Mandarin; English
- No. of episodes: 345 (original run); 320 (overseas version)

Production
- Executive producers: Luo Chong-wen; Li Neng-qian
- Producer: Kung Mei-fu
- Running time: 90 minutes (Original run); 60 minutes (Rerun/overseas version)

Original release
- Network: SET Taiwan
- Release: 24 February 2004 – 22 June 2005

Related
- Sky and Earth Has Affection; The Golden Ferris Wheel

Taiwan Tornado (Chinese: 台灣龍捲風) is a Taiwanese television series that was shown on SET Taiwan from 24 February 2004 to 22 June 2005, lasting 345 episodes.

During 2020, the drama resurfaced online due to some notable phrases that were repeatedly used in the show, and 2 years later, on June 6, 2022, Sanlih E-Television began to re-release in HD, one episode a day, on their YouTube at 12:00 local time. Due to increased demand, this was changed to 2 episodes a day, starting on July 18, 2022.

== Summary ==
Huang Chi-Chung is the second son of the Huang family, which owns Taiwan Chao-Lian Group. Chi-Chung and his older brother, Huang Chi-Long, bribe the prosecutor for a death penalty case that his family is involved in. However, the prosecutor changes his mind about the matter. Chi-Chung leads his men to confront the prosecutor, who later falls off an elevated expressway and dies. To lie low for a while, Chi-Chung accepts his brother's arrangement and goes into hiding in the southern region of Taiwan. However, after he arrives there, he is controlled by a crime syndicate. After he is drugged and becomes hardly conscious, he inadvertently rapes Chia-Yi, who is a nice good girl. After the rape, Chia-Yi swears to get Chi-Chung to face up the legal consequences; later, she finds she is impregnated by Chi-Chung, and this strengthens her will to fight a battle between the rich (Chi-Chung) and the poor (herself).

Surprisingly, the mastermind of the whole thing is Huang Chi-Long. Huang Chi-Long sets Chi-Chung up so that Chi-Long can become the successor of the family business. Hence, a battle within the Huang family is about to start. As a storm is quietly approaching, who will turn out to be the winner?

== Cast ==
- Chen Chao-jung as Huang Chi-Chung
- Yeh Chuan-Chen as Fang Chia-Yi
- Franco Chiang as Huang Chi-Long
- Fang Tsen as Maggie Yeh and Angel Yeh
- Richard Shen as Chou Chien-Ming
- Ricky Liew (credited as Chiang Kuan-hao) as Huang Chi-Ming
- Alex Ko as Huang Wen-Ting
- Athena Lee Yen as Lu Hsiao-Fen (Yvonne)
- Fon Cin as Lu Tien-Min
- Joanne Lien as Li Hsin-Ling
- Hsing Hui as Huang Chi-Han
- Yu Shang as Chen Tai-Pao
- Rene Hou as Lin An-Na
- Wang Hui-Wu as Huang Ping-Chun and Huang A-Niu
- Lin Hsiu-Ling as Hung Mei-Hua
- Chang Ching-I as Tsai Hsiu-Fen
- Chen Shu-Fang as Huang Kuo A-Man
- Pang Hsiang-Lin as Huang Ping-Chiu
- Wang Hao as Yuan Shi-Hsiung
- Miao Ke-li as Liu Yu-ying
- Ho Kuan-Ying as Ho Chung-Wei
- Lindsey Huang as Lu Kuan-Sheng
- Ho I-Tung as Chang Tai-Chi
- Chu Yung-Te as Li Yung-Lin
- Lin Yu-Hsing as Wang Yung-Te
- Ting Kuo-Lin as Gigi

== Controversy ==
On December 16, 2004, Zhang Chao-cheng, who was producer of Formosa TV's "Desire for Life" a prime-time drama that was then airing in the same time-slot as Taiwan Tornado until September 22, panned Taiwan Tornado for showing acts of violence that were "indoctrinating children" (where Taiwan has more criticism for situations like these, instead of in the Western world, where it is normally ignored). After this Sanlih's PR department responded by saying that The Unforgettable Memory, a drama that aired after "Desire for Life" also had acts of violence, such as patricide, arson committed as organized crime, and a bargirl arming herself with a gun. Guo Hong-Liang, who was the producer for The Unforgettable Memory refuted with, "How can we have the plot of the son killing the father? Everyone’s eyes are discerning."

== International broadcast ==
=== Singapore ===
An abridged 60-minute version that lasted 320 episodes (which would later be always used as an overseas/rerun copy) was broadcast on weekdays at 11pm from October 26, 2009, to June 27, 2012, but due to local broadcast laws prohibiting radio or television broadcasts in Chinese dialects, the show was dubbed into Mandarin when it aired on Singapore's MediaCorp Channel 8, thus making it the first channel to broadcast the show in Mandarin. It was later rebroadcast starting on March 21, 2011, weekdays at 4am to 6am (airing two episodes per day).

=== Malaysia ===
The show aired on NTV7, weekdays at 4:30pm starting April 20, 2011.

=== Vietnam ===
The show aired on Echannel at 9pm to 11pm (airing two episodes a day) from July 4, 2013 to December 11, 2013.
