= Michael Huang (actor) =

- 黃仲崑
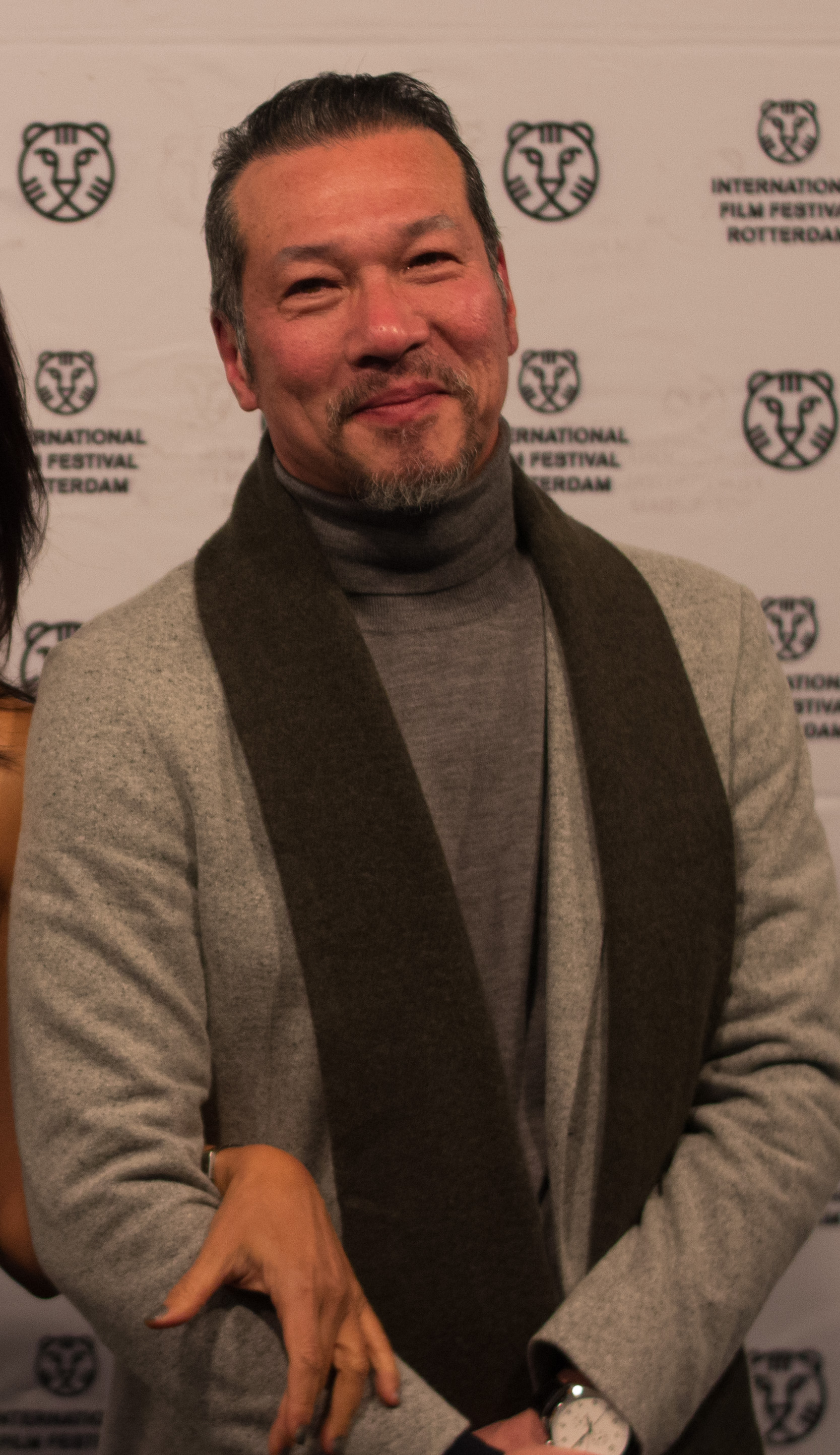
- Born: November 28, 1958 (age 67); Taiwan
- Education: Affiliated Senior High School of National Taiwan Normal University; Shih Hsin School of Journalism
- Occupations: Actor, singer, television host
- Years active: 1980—present
- Spouses: Nan Hsi (m. 1989; div. 1994) Lulu Huang (m. 2007)
- Children: 2 (including Sean Huang)
- Musical career
- Also known as: Huang Chung-kun; Huang Zhongkun

Michael Huang (Chinese: 黃仲崑; Pe̍h-ōe-jī: N̂g Tiōng-khun, born November 28, 1958) is a Taiwanese actor and singer.

== Filmography ==
=== Film ===
Year	English title	Original title	Role	Notes
1981	Cute Girl	就是溜溜的她		Cameo
1981	Longing	蹦蹦一串心		
1986	The Kinmen Bombs	八二三炮戰	Wei Chung-ho	
1986	The Lock of Hearts	心鎖	Chiang Meng-shih	Alternative title: Desire
1989	Heaven Dragon Earth Tiger	天龍地虎	Cheng Yi-ta	
1995	Infatuation	孽戀		
1999	Cop Abula	條子阿不拉		
2000	A Matter of Time	新賭國仇城		
2001	The Died Body	毀屍滅跡		
2008	Ballistic	彈．道	Chen Chen-chung	
2009	02'20''	2分 20秒		
2012	76 Pages of Secret	76頁的秘密		Short film
2013	27°C - Loaf Rocks	世界第一麥方	Wang	
2014	The Gathering	同學會	Fang Chao-ming	
2014	Zai Ge Zai Wu	再歌再舞		Television
2016	Mole of Life	黑白	Chang Han-tung	
2017	Hanky Panky	大釣哥	Chang Kuo-liang	
2018	Father to Son	范保德	Van Pao-te	
2018	The Big Day	簡單的婚禮	Bawa	
2019	Big Three Dragons	大三元	Nan Feng Er Bo	
2023	Alone	空巢	Tu Cheng-sheng	

=== Theater ===
Year	English title	Original title	Notes
2001	Love Wasabi	愛情哇沙米	
2008	The Village	寶島一村	Cameo

=== Variety show ===
Network	English title	Original title	Notes
CTV	72+1	—N/a	Chinese New Year special, host
CTV	The Ultimate Super Stars	巨星金曲	Host
CTS	Happy Team	歡樂外景隊	Host

=== Television series ===
Year	English title	Original title	Role	Notes
1982	Tian Ya Chi Zi Qing	天涯赤子情		
1988	Purple Dream	紫色的夢		
1989	Starry Sky Night	星夜的天空		
1989	Angel's Love	天使之愛		
1990	Mo Dao Wu Qing	莫道無情		
1990	Money Laundering	洗錢		
1994	Love from Taiwan	台灣情		
1994	Shen Gui Meng Li Qing	深閨夢裡情		
1995	Cao Di Nu Xu	草地女婿	Li Tien-lin	
1996	Snapping of Love	奪愛		
1996	King of Gambler	千王之王重出江湖	Chang Kun	
1996	The Good Old Days	再見艷陽天	Lo Ping	
1997	Sweet Potato Sir	大巡按蕃薯官		
1997	We Are Family	我們一家都是人之一間客棧	Huang Zuo-shan	
1997	Taiwan Paranormal Events	台灣靈異事件之鬼妾	Huang Hao-hsien	
1997	The Strange Cases of Lord Shih	施公奇案之血手印	Chang San-lang	
1998	Once	曾經		
1998	Sun Plants	太陽花	Wang Han-wen	
1998	Women at Thirty	女人三十		
1998	Ming Tian You Ni	明天有你		
1998	The Female Official	女巡按		
1998	Bu Dai He Shang	布袋和尚－仙女奇緣	Tang Ri-guang	
1999	Ten Tigers Of Guangdong	英雄之廣東十虎	Liang Kun	
1999	Taiwan Liao Tian Ding	台灣廖添丁	Chou Wan-fu	
1999	A Pair of Swallows	燕雙飛	Shih Lin	
2001	Duo Sang and Rose	多桑與紅玫瑰	Yang Chung-wei	
2001	Taiwan Ah Cheng	台灣阿誠	Danny Yang	
2002	Fiery Thunderbolt	台灣霹靂火	Liu Tien-fu	
2002	Online Hero	天下無雙	Wu Chih-cheng	
2002	The Legendary Siblings 2	絕世雙驕	Yan Haotian	
2003	The Pawnshop No. 8	第8號當舖	Lin Kuan-hua	
2003	100% Senorita	千金百分百	President Chou	
2003	Love Never Dies	牽手向明天	Liu Li-wei	
2004	Taiwan Tornado	台灣龍捲風	Chou A-tsai	
2004	The Unforgettable Memory	意難忘	Huang Kun-shan	
2006	What Emmanuel Wants	艾曼紐要怎樣	Commander	
2007	Hao Men Ben Se	豪門本色	Yen Hsiang-tien	
2007	I Shall Succeed	我一定要成功	Chen Kun-shan	
2007	Hand in Hand	牽手天涯		
2008	Aunt A-xi	阿惜姨	Lin Sang	
2008	Time Story	光陰的故事	Tao Chien-an	
2008	Love Above All	真情滿天下	Hsu Chin-hai	
2009	Happy Together	青梅竹馬	Huang Chen-tung	Alternative title: 4 Friends
2010	Endless Love	愛∞無限	Kun	
2010	4 Daughters	家有四千金	Wu Si-ji	
2011	Somewhere Over The Sky	雲頂天很藍	Li Tsung-han	
2011	Local Hero	田庄英雄	Wang Yuan-ting	
2012	Gentle Mercy	溫柔的慈悲	Li Tung	
2012	The M Riders 4	萌學園4時空戰役		
2012	The Late Night Stop	小站	Chairman Wen	
2013	Happy 300 Days	遇見幸福300天	Bao	
2013	PMAM	—N/a	Yinyin's father	
2014	Lonely River	在河左岸	Chao Nan	
2014	White Magnolia	孤戀花	Chiang Lang	
2014	Teacher Gangstar	神仙老師狗	Mai Ching-ho	
2014	After Aura	光環之後	Andy Yang	Webseries
2014	Say I Love You	勇敢說出我愛你	Chiang	
2014	Monga Woman	艋舺的女人	Masa (Chen Cheng-yi)	
2014	Diva Journey	天后之徵	Andy Yang	Webseries
2014	First Kiss	真愛配方	Chao Kuo-chang	
2015	Wake Up	麻醉風暴	Chen Hsien-jung	
2015	When I See You Again	他看她的第2眼	An Ting-yuan	
2016	Close to You	靠近	Chen Chi-wen	
2016	KO One: Re-member	終極一班4	Lone Wolf	
2016	Chong Xin. Mei Lai Guo	重新。沒來過	Lai	Webseries
2016	Hero	大英雄	Liar	Cameo
2017	The Teenage Psychic	通靈少女	Chao Chin-huo	Cameo
2017	Wake Up 2	麻醉風暴2	Chen Hsien-jung	
2017	The Lead	第一主角	Ma Xinhai	
2017	The Bar	私室	Morris Chen	Webseries

== Discography ==
=== Studio albums ===
Title	Album details	Track listing
Question to Ask 我想問你	Released: July 1980; Label: Kolin Records; Formats: CD	Track listing: 1. 我想問你; 2. 牽掛; 3. 我不說你也不用講; 4. 星兒在微笑; 5. 旅途的風光; 6. 你說過; 7. 偶然偶然; 8. 驪聲; 9. 貝殼海; 10. 繡著小花的手提包
Remember Me 記得我	Released: November 1982; Label: Zhong Yi Records; Formats: CD	Track listing: 1. 記得我; 2. 別後的思念; 3. 花語; 4. 雨過的彩虹; 5. Longer; 6. 你的鼓勵; 7. 無人的海邊; 8. 往事悠悠; 9. 走出陰影; 10. 不要回頭; 11. Let your love flow 12. 小星星的見證
Yellow River 黃河的水	Released: June 1983; Label: Zhong Yi Records; Formats: CD	Track listing: 1. 黃河的水; 2. 請問星星; 3. 重逢之後; 4. 月影; 5. 送你一程; 6. 不要為我流淚; 7. 路邊小溪; 8. 夏日潮聲; 9. And I Love Her; 10. 夢已醒; 11. 河 12. 最好說再見
Enlighten 悟	Released: March 1984; Label: Zhong Yi Records; Formats: CD	Track listing: 1. 悟 2. 文明併發症; 3. 錯誤的遊戲; 4. 曾有的時光; 5. 最美的錯誤; 6. 故事的真相 黃仲昆;楊林; 7. 城市臉; 8. 沙灘上的回憶; 9. 江水向東流; 10. 悟（演奏曲）
Regret 悔	Released: November 1984; Label: Zhong Yi Records; Formats: CD	Track listing: 1. 悔 2. 賭注; 3. 有一種寂寞; 4. 貝殼的故鄉; 5. 分手; 6. 座右銘; 7. 當我; 8. 苦澀的呢喃; 9. 獨身的理由; 10. 愛囚; 11. 不能沒有你; 12. 愛的臉
Missing 想想想	Released: August 1985; Label: Zhong Yi Records; Formats: CD	Track listing
No Other Expectations 別無奢求	Released: April 1988; Label: Warren Records; Formats: CD	Track listing: 1. 別無奢求; 2. 通緝者(黃金孔雀城片尾曲); 3. 愛情逃犯; 4. 情債; 5. 給寶貝; 6. 冷冷的街頭; 7. 你在我眼中找到什麼; 8. 胸中的火焰; 9. 夜歸人(女聲：黃韻如); 10. 保護自己
Love and Promise 愛與承諾	Released: July 1994; Label: Star Music; Formats: CD	Track listing: 1. 有多少愛可以重來; 2. 愛如風起; 3. 夜未眠; 4. 妳就是我的心; 5. 我真的愛你; 6. SIMPLE HEART; 7. 你一直是我等待的回答; 8. 難道是我的錯; 9. 你說過; 10. 心不怨 人不變

== Published works ==
- Michael Huang and Lulu Huang (2004). Love Yoga. Taipei: Bo Shi Ke Yi. ISBN 957298604X.
- Michael Huang and Lulu Huang (2013). Volume 6 of Ray Health. New Taipei City: Ray Books. ISBN 9789868828995.

== Awards and nominations ==
Year	Award	Category	Nominated work	Result
2015	50th Golden Bell Awards	Best Supporting Actor in a Miniseries or Television Film	Wake Up	Nominated
