= Sky and Earth Has Affection =

- Chinese: 天地有情
- Hokkien POJ: Thiⁿ‑tē-ū-chêng
- Genre: Xiangtu drama
- Written by: Lin Lingling; Chen Xiao-bing
- Directed by: Lin Ying; Yang Xuan
- Starring: Eric Huang; Royce Wong; Alex Ko
- Opening theme: 戀人啊 by Guo Guibin
- Ending theme: 心痛的戀情 by Cai Xiaohu
- Country of origin: Taiwan
- Original language: Hokkien
- No. of episodes: 156 (Taiwan); 180 (Re-run)

Production
- Executive producers: Shu Wei-zhong; Liu Shi-fan
- Producer: Chen Yijun
- Running time: 92 minutes

Original release
- Network: SET Taiwan, SET Drama (Taiwan)
- Release: 22 July 2003 – 24 February 2004

Related
- Stairway to Heaven (South Korea); Fiery Thunderbolt; Taiwan Tornado

Sky and Earth Has Affection (also known as World Affectionate or Love & Affection) is a Taiwanese television series. It aired from July 22, 2003 to February 24, 2004. It showed on SET Taiwanevery weeknight from 8 pm to 9:30 pm.

== Cast ==
- Louis Hsiao as Chiang Sheng-huang
- Eric Huang as Chiang/Huang Tianlin
- Mayko Chen as Chen Shu-ting/Hsu Hsiao-yu
- Royce Wong as Chiang Qingwen
- Jeannie Hsieh as Chiang Qingxia
- Alex Ko as Shi Zhengjie
- Miao Ke-li as Wu Ruiying
- Fon Cin as Lin Xinlan
- Athena Lee as Liu/Chen Qiao-an
- Rex Kao as Shi Zhengbang
- Lin Zhengtian as Shi Quangun
- Hu Hongda as Shi Guo-qin
- Yang Huaimin as Huang Kun-nan
- Li Huiying as Zhou Xiu-fang
- Franco Chiang as Lin Wen-tang
- Joanne Lien as Huang Tian-mei
- Norman Chen as Yang Zhi-feng

== Broadcast ==
=== Overseas ===
The show has been introduced to Mainland China, in 2007 during the Chinese New Year, China Central Television dubbed the show in Mandarin, airing February 16, 2007 to July 31, 2007 at 4:47 pm with a total of 165 episodes. The show has also been dubbed to Vietnamese which aired on Echannel (VTVCab5) which aired from February 24, 2016 to September 1, 2016, at 4:55 pm, with a total of 192 episodes which were dubbed from the rerun version of the show.

=== Re-run ===
The drama re-broadcast on SET Taiwan from May 11, 2004, to April 1, 2005, at Monday to Friday at 5 pm – 6 pm, with a total of 180 episodes.
