= Mom's House =

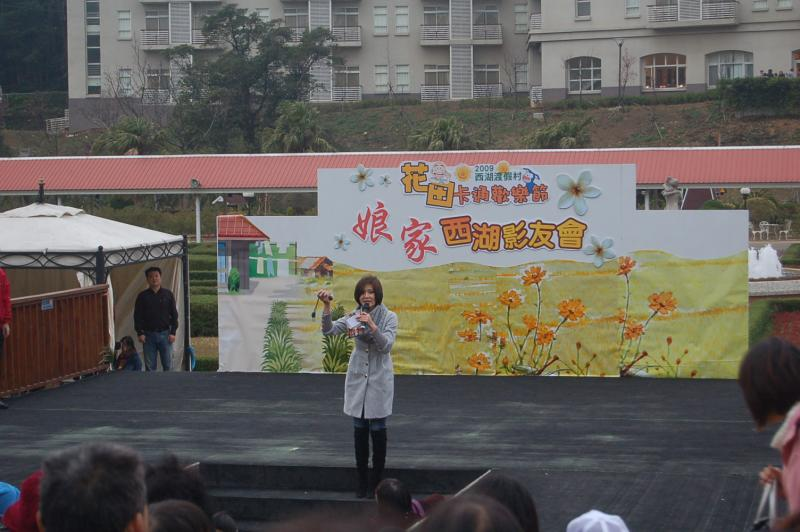
- Mom's House fan club at West Lake Resortopia, January 2009
- Also known as: A Place Called Home
- Chinese: 娘家
- Hanyu Pinyin: Niáng Jiā
- Hokkien POJ: Niâ-ka
- Genre: Family; Romance; Society; Office Politics; Family Business
- Opening theme: 1. 買醉的人 by Tsai Hsiao-hu; 2. 愛無後悔 by 林姍、Weng Li-you; 3. 行棋 by Weng Li-you; 4. 珍惜 by Long Qianyu; 5. 望天 by Luo Shih-feng; 6. 用真心愛一個人 by Tsai Hsiao-hu; 7. 伴你過一生 by 林姍、Weng Li-you; 8. 香水 by Chiang Chih-feng、Chang Hsiu-ching
- Ending theme: 1. 〈牽手〉Su Rui; 2. 〈炮仔聲〉（2009年12月22日）(第415集); 詞：黃士祐、曲：森祐士、演唱：Jody Chiang
- Country of origin: Taiwan
- Original language: Hokkien (Formosa Television)
- No. of episodes: 415 (original run); 937 (overseas version)

Production
- Running time: 120-150 minutes 45 minutes without advertisements (Mediacorp Channel 8)

Original release
- Network: Formosa Television; Mediacorp Channel 8
- Release: 13 March 2015 – 9 November 2018

Mom's House is a Taiwanese Hokkien television drama that began airing on Formosa Television in Taiwan. This is also known as the first HD drama ever broadcast on Formosa Television. During the last week of the drama's run, where the final two episode were broadcast, Formosa Television received the highest rating ever recorded in their 8 o'clock slot, which was 9.78 million. On average, the show received 7.97 million viewers.

== Plot ==
Retired principal, Lin Shishi, marries off his three daughters one by one. But even as his daughters venture into their brand new lives, Lin and his wife continue to give them their non-wavering support whenever they encounter obstacles in their marriages.

== Cast ==
- Shi Ying as Lin Shishi
- Tang Meiyen as Wu Baozhu
- Lei Hong as Peng Dahai
- Mike Lee as Peng Jianhong
- Fon Cin as Lin Liyun

== Accolades ==
Year	Ceremony	Category	Nominee	Result
2008	43rd Golden Bell Awards	TV series Actor Award	Rejon	Won
2009	44th Golden Bell Awards	TV series Actress Award	Tang Mei-yun	Nominated

== International broadcast ==
=== Malaysia ===
The drama was broadcast on Astro Hua Hee Dai, weekdays at 8:30-9:30pm, starting on November 17, 2008 and concluding on July 8, 2012. Another Astro channel, Ria, broadcast the show in its original Taiwan episode length daily at 7pm starting on January 4, 2010 and ending on September 27, 2011. The drama was also broadcast on 8TV under the English title Mother's House for two episodes with one hour each from Monday to Friday, at 11:30 MST and 13:00 MST with a 30 minutes break of its Midday Mandarin News at 12:30 MST. The drama was broadcast on 8TV starting on January 2, 2013 and ending on October 21, 2014.

=== Gala Television ===
Gala Television another broadcaster in Taiwan, showed the drama Monday - Friday in the timeslot of 5-7pm, each day showing 2 one-hour format episodes on GTV One. The broadcast started on May 3, 2010 and concluded on October 14, 2011.

=== Indonesia ===
Indosiar broadcast the drama daily, 7-10pm, starting on May 9, 2011

=== Singapore ===
The drama was first broadcast on VV Drama at 19:00–20:00 from Monday to Friday Premiere (+3) at 22:00–23:00. It was also broadcast in the morning from 1:14–2:04 am and 9:00–9:50 am. It was also broadcast in the afternoon from 2:00–2:50 pm. The broadcast started on December 5, 2009.

The series was also broadcast in Singapore Channel, Mediacorp Channel 8 on weekdays from 4:30 to 5:30 pm. It is the fifth Taiwan drama to broadcast the show in Singapore but due to local broadcast laws prohibiting radio or television broadcasts in Chinese dialects, the show was dubbed into Mandarin when it aired on Singapore's MediaCorp Channel 8, thus making it the first channel to broadcast the show in Mandarin. The show began on 13 March 2015 and has a total of 937 episodes and ended its run in 2018.

==== Repeat Telecast (2017) ====
The series is repeating its broadcast from 4–6:00 am and ended its repeat telecast in 2019.

=== Macau ===
TDM Ou Mun broadcast the drama on the weekdays, showing two episodes. One at 11:30-12:30pm and one at 1:00pm–2:00pm. Broadcast started on December 5, 2011.
