= Chu Xuan =

Taiwanese actress (born 1981)

- Born: Tseng Chia-lin (曾嘉琳); December 13, 1981 (age 43); Taipei, Taiwan
- Occupation: Actress
- Years active: 2001–present

Tseng Chia-lin (born 13 December 1981), better known by her stage name Chu Xuan, is a Taiwanese television actress, best known for supporting roles in long-running Hokkien-language soap operas like Taiwan Tornado, I Shall Succeed, Love Above All, My Family My Love, Night Market Life, Feng Shui Family.
