= Chiang Tsu-ping =

Taiwanese actress and television host

- 江祖平
- Born: Taiwan
- Education: National Taiwan College of Performing Arts
- Occupations: Actress, television host
- Years active: 1994–present
- Musical career
- Also known as: Jiang Zuping

Chiang Tsu-ping (Chinese: 江祖平; pinyin: Jiāng Zǔpíng) is a Taiwanese actress and television host, best known for her television dramas. Between 2005 and 2010 Chiang emerged as a viewers' favorite in Taiwan and other Hokkien-speaking regions for her diverse roles in long-running soap operas like The Unforgettable Memory, The Spirit of Love, Mom's House and Night Market Life. Singapore's The New Paper called her the "Hokkien soap queen".

== Selected filmography ==
- Tomorrow
- Wind and Cloud
- 100% Senorita
- The Pawnshop No. 8
- The Unforgettable Memory
- The Spirit of Love
- Mom's House
- Night Market Life
- Imperfect
- Taste of Life
