= The Spirits of Love =

- Chinese: 愛
- Literal meaning: Love
- Hokkien POJ: Ài
- Genre: Drama
- Written by: Wen Lifang; Huang Yuqin; Zhao Qijun; Li Zhonghe; Lin Zhenhao
- Directed by: Wang Wei
- Starring: Chen Meifeng; Fon Cin; Wang Shih-hsien; Chiang Tsu-ping
- Opening theme: "我問天" by Weng Li-you
- Ending theme: "迷魂香" by Weng Li-you "夢醒在三更" by Tsai Hsiao-hu and Zhang Xiuqing "一生的愛" by Long Qianyu "心疼" by Tsai Hsiao-hu "勇敢" by Huang Siting "只愛你一個" by Long Qianyu "不應該愛你" by Tsai Hsiao-hu
- Country of origin: Taiwan
- Original language: Hokkien
- No. of episodes: 386 (original run); 787 (overseas version)

Production
- Executive producers: Xu Wenli; Li Yuqi
- Producers: Guo Hongliang; Lin Huijun; Cai Chongzhe; Wu Jialong; Cai Peiying
- Running time: 105 minutes (episodes 1-59 and 65-176); 130 minutes (episodes 225-385); 90 minutes (episodes 60-64); 120 minutes (episodes 177-224); 60 minutes (finale, overseas version)

Original release
- Network: Formosa Television
- Release: 21 January 2006 – 2 July 2011

The Spirits of Love (Chinese: 愛; Pe̍h-ōe-jī: Ài; lit. 'love'), also known as Love, is a Taiwanese Hokkien television drama that aired on Formosa Television in Taiwan from 21 November 2006 to 31 May 2010. It stars Chen Meifeng, Wang Shih-hsien, Fon Cin & Chiang Tsu-ping. The show has five theme songs including Wu Bai & China Blue's 1995 hit "Love You Ten Thousand Years" (愛你一萬年). It aired in Taiwan every weeknight at prime time (20:00) and had a total of 386 episodes.

== Cast ==
=== Luos ===
Actor	Role	Description
Zhang Mingjie	Luo Shihong; Mr Tanaka	Lin Chunhua's ex-husband Anping and An'an and Anshun's father Yiting's father-in-law Li Manna's ex-boyfriend Cheat Li Manna's money together with Ji Baoluo
Song Yimin	Luo Anping	Shihong and Lin Chunhua's son Aunshun and An'an's elder brother Yiting's husband Last appeared in episode 241
Ye Jiayu	Song Yiting	Song Zhenchang's younger daughter Song Yixin and Song Hongyuan's younger sister Anping's late wife Deceased of bone cancer in episode 98
No cast or Uncredited	Luo Anshun	Shihong and Lin Chunhua's son An'an's elder brother Anping's younger brother Deceased
June Tsai	Luo An'an	Shihong and Lin Chunhua's daughter Anping and Anshun's younger sister Wang Wenqiang's ex-girlfriend Went abroad later

=== Lins ===
Actor	Role	Description
Chen Meifeng	Lin Chunhua	Luo Shihong's ex-wife Shuhua's sister Anping and An'an's mother Liu Maoxiong's ex-girlfriend Yiting's mother-in-law Nanako's superior Last appeared episode 211
Fang Xin	Lin Shuhua	See the Lis.

=== Wangs ===
Actor	Role	Description
Lung Shao-hua	Wang Jinlong	Originally named Taibao; Xiao-zhen's father Wenqiang's foster father Previously one of Fang Mingyi's men
Gao Yu-Zhen	Xiao-zhen	Jinlong's daughter Xi's foster daughter Had a crush on Wenqiang; Hearing loss in left ear

For Wang Wenqiang, see the Zhangs

=== Mas ===
Actor	Role	Description
Ma Ju-feng	Ma Junfeng	Zhang Caiyun's late husband Yuankai's father Previously one of Fang Mingyi's men Later killed by Caiyun
Angus Xie	Ma Yuankai	Nicknamed 'Kaiwen' (Kevin); Junfeng and Caiyun's son Wenqiang's half-brother Cai Qiaoyin's ex-husband Had a crush on Xiao-zhen but rejected Later left her

=== Zhangs ===
Actor	Role	Description
Man-Ning Xi	Zhang Caiyun	Fang Mingyi and Junfeng's ex-wife Wenqiang and Yuankai's mother Later imprisoned for killing Junfeng
Wu Yanjie(younger); Mike Lee(older)	Wang Wenqiang	Jinlong's foster son Fang Mingyi and Caiyun's biological son Xiaoyu's classmate An'an and Kexin's ex-boyfriend Yuankai's half-brother Hongyuan's friend Deceased - drowned episode 347

=== Songs ===
Actor	Role	Description
Cui Haoran	Song Zhenchang	Yixin, Hongyuan and Yiting's father Shuhua's ex-husband Congmin's ex-father-in-law Deceased episode 108 of heart attack
Liao Jiayi	Song Yixin	Congmin's ex-wife Zhenchang's first daughter Hongyuan and Yiting's sister Zhou Aimei's friend Later went to USA to study
Fu Zichun	Song Hongyuan	Song Zhenchang's second son Yixin's younger brother Yiting's elder brother Duoli's husband Often worries his father Later realised his mistake Took over the Songs' career after Zhenchang's death
Qiu Qiwen	Duoli	Originally named Yang Zhengli; Hongyuan's wife Zhengjie's sister Once took drugs
Ye Jiayu	Song Yiting	See the Luos.

=== Lius ===
Actor	Role	Description
Liu Shangqian	Liu Maoxiong	Lele's father Chunhua's first love Against Lele marrying Shixian; Killed episode 205 by Yang Zhengjie
Lin Weijun	Liu Lele	Maoxiong's daughter Yang Huai'an and Shixian's ex-girlfriend Tour guide Once liked Yang Zhengjie; Deceased episode 230 falling off a cliff in a car

=== Yangs ===
Actor	Role	Description
Liu Zhihan	Yang Zhengjie	Duoli's brother World Hotel's former Accountant and Managing Director; Mingming's ex-husband Killed Maoxiong and Lele; Last appeared in episode 260
Qiu Qiwen	Duoli	See the Songs.

=== Masha's family (United Hotel) ===
Actor	Role	Description
Jiang Qingxia	Masha's mother	Masha and Amy's mother Aimei's mother-in-law Make Congmin change for the better
Lin Yifang	Masha	Originally named Wu Zhaomei; Aimei's husband Amy's brother
Ding Guolin	Zhou Aimei	Song Yixin's friend Masha's wife Once cheated Congmin's money Later worked with Congmin and Mingming to deal with Yingming
Li Zhiqin	Amy	Masha's sister Masha's mother's daughter Congmin's girlfriend Once cheated of love and money by Bin

=== Lis ===
Actor	Role	Description
Lee Hsing-wen	Li Zhonghe	Shuhua's husband Lixue's ex-husband Baodi's father Renjie's stepfather Anping and An'an's uncle Released from prison together with Anping
Fang Xin	Lin Shuhua	Chunhua's sister Anping and An'an's aunt Zhonghe's wife Zhenchang's ex-wife Congmin's ex-girlfriend Renjie's mother Baodi's stepmother
Lin Guanyu	Li Baodi	Zhonghe and Lixue's son Shuhua's stepson
Shen Jiaxin	Li Renjie; Guo Renjie	Congmin and Shuhua's son Zhonghe's stepson

=== Hong Shuibo's family ===
Actor	Role	Description
Lei Hong	Hong Shuibo	Wu Xiuqin's uncle Wu Jinsheng's brother-in-law Huixin's husband Shixian's stepfather Zhaoyi's godfather Rivals with Zhou Yingming
Fong-Hua Chiu	Fang Huixin	Hong's former second wife Shixian's mother World Hotel's director Shuibo's wife Xiuqin's aunt Tang Kexin's godmother
Wang Shih-hsien	Fang Shixian	Huixin's son Shuibo's stepson Hong Zhizhong's half-brother Liu Lele's ex-boyfriend Hotel Operations Manager; Chairman of the Fishermen's Association; Legislator for Chiayi County; Everyone tried to matchmake him and Tang Zhen but failed In the end Guo Congmin returned him all hotel shares

=== Guos ===
Actor	Role	Description
Jimmy Ni	Guo Congmin	Nicknamed as 'Handsome Min'; Amy's boyfriend Song Yixin's ex-husband Lin Shuhua's ex-boyfriend Huimin's elder brother Renjie's father Goes to USA for treatment in episode 228; Returned to Taiwan in episode 339; Later became the Deputy General Manager of Paramount Entertainment Group Asia; Attained 50% of World Hotel's shares In the end returned all shares to Shixian
Zhang Ruihan (Zhang Xiai)	Guo Huimin	Congmin's younger sister Irontooth's girlfriend Once cheated of love and money by Bin

=== Hongs (World Hotel) ===
Actor	Role	Description
Huang Yingxun	Hong Zhizhong	Zhang Meiqin's son Xiuying's foster son Lai Jialing's ex-husband Xiaoli's husband Jianzhong's elder brother Shixian's half-brother Birthname was Zhou Shijia; Mingwei and Mingchang's father Former Managing Director of World Hotel; Once a Councillor (Assembly member); Once captured scene of Yang Zhengjie killing Liu Maoxiong; Killed in episode 307 by Zhou Yingming
Bing	He Xiaoli	Zhizhong's wife Mingchang's mother Mingwei's stepmother Once extorted money from Gao Mingcheng for him to buy Mingchang
Yan Junyi	Hong Mingwei	Zhizhong and Lai Jialing's son Deceased - Drowned episode 103 when rescuing schoolmate
Liao Boxiang	Hong Mingchang	Zhizhong and Xiaoli's son
Chen Yufeng	Hong Jianzhong	Xiuying's son Zhaoyi's husband Xie Mingming's ex-husband and university mate Zhizhong's adoptive brother Shixian's half-brother
Angel Han	Huang Zhaoyi	Nicknamed as 'Joanna' and 'Wawa'; Jianzhong's wife Wu Jinsheng and Huang Ailing's daughter Hong Shuibo's goddaughter Wu Xiuqin's half-sister
Liu Hsiu-wen	Zhang Xiuyang	Former chairman of World Hotel; Mother of Hong Jianzhong and Hong Zhizhong

=== Wus (Former County Council Speaker's family) ===
Actor	Role	Description
Lin Tzay-peir	Wu Jinsheng	Lai Wuji's father-in-law Former Speaker of the Chiayi County Council; Xiuqin and Zhaoyi's father Hong Shuibo's brother-in-law Huang Ailing's lover Xie Mingming's co-partner
Cheng Chung Yin	Wu Xiuqin	See the Lais.
Angel Han-Yu	Huang Zhaoyi	See the Hongs (World Hotel).

=== Lais ===
Actor	Role	Description
Hsu Heng	Lai Wuji	Wu Xuiqin's husband Chairman of Councilor; Lai Jialing elder brother
Teresa Te	Lai Jialing	Lai Wuji's younger sister Hong Zhizhong ex - wife Deceased due to cancer
Cheng Chung Yin	Wu Xuqin	Lai Wuji's Wife; Wu Jinsheng's daughter

=== Xies ===
Actor	Role	Description
Chiang Tsu-ping	Xie Mingming	Hong Jianzhong's ex-wife Managing Director and General Manager of World Hotel with Yang Zhengjie; In a relationship with Yang Zhengjie and married him Chased out of World Hotel by Yang Zhengjie; Yang Zhengjie's ex-wife Was in Prison then released Tried to burn Wawa to death in a deserted house but in the end burn her face Cause the death of Wawa's mum Once worked for Yingming; Married Zhou Yingming and get 50% of World Hotel Shares; Betrayed Zhou Yingming; Return 50% of World Hotel Shares to the Hongs; Kidnapped by Zhou Yingming in episode 383 with her father Shot by Zhou Yingming and landed in the hospital Zhou Yingming's wife Wu Jinsheng's co - partner
Zhang Youming	Xie Wunan	Father of Xie Mingming; Restaurant Manager of World Hotel; Kidnapped by Zhou Yingming in episode 383 with Xie Mingming; Got beaten to death by Zhou Yingming men Deceased at episode 384

=== Tangs ===
Actor	Role	Description
June Tsai	Tang Zhen	Nurse; Love interest with Fang Shixian

=== Tang Zhen's family ===
Actor	Role	Description
Uncredited	Tang Zhen's father	Tang Zhen's father Working with Zhou Yingming; Deceased

=== Dings ===
Actor	Role	Description
Ding Li Qi	Ding Shimin	Deceased - finale Worked for Zhou Yingming; Xiaoyu's Husband; Mrs. Li's Son; Jiahe's Father; Wanted by the police after killing several People
Hou Yi-Jun	Xiaoyu	Had a baby named Ding Jiahe; Jiahe's Mother; Ding Shimin's Wife
Zhang Qin	Mrs. Li	Ding Shimin's Mother; Ding Jiahe's Grandmother; Xiaoyu's Mother In Law

== Soundtrack ==
=== Theme song ===
Song title	Performer
我问天	Weng Liyou

=== Sub theme songs ===
Song title	Performer
迷魂香	Weng Liyou
夢醒在三更	Cai Xiaohu and Zhang Xiuqing
一生的愛	Long Qianyu
心疼	Cai Xiaohu
勇敢	Huang Siting
只愛你一個	Long Qianyu
不應該愛你	Cai Xiaohu

== International broadcast ==
=== Singapore broadcast ===
The show was originally broadcast on November 9, 2008, on Channel 8, with the show having a timeslot of 7pm on the weekends, with it being dubbed in Mandarin Chinese, as it is prohibited in Singapore to broadcast in non-Mandarin Chinese varieties. Love's timeslot was extended to the weekdays, making it a daily series. The timeslot was pushed back to only weekdays. Love concluded its run on Channel 8 on October 21, 2011.

The show, particularly its intro music, has gained somewhat of a status in Singapore, with many youths and young adults fondly recounting hearing the theme song when watching the series along with their parents or grandparents.

==== Repeat Telecast (2012) ====
The drama repeated its run from Monday - Thursday from 10.30 am to 12.30pm (two episodes per day), starting on November 8, 2012, and ended its repeat telecast on September 30, 2014.

=== Vietnam broadcast ===
The show was first broadcast in Vietnamese on Vinh Long Province’s Radio and Television Station, channel 1 (THVL1). The show was broadcast every weekday at the 5 pm time slot, running from October 23, 2010, to September 23, 2012.

=== Malaysia broadcast ===
The drama was broadcast on Astro Hua Hee Dai in the show's original Hokkien language on Weekdays 4:30pm to 5:30pm.
