= Ma Ju-feng =

Taiwanese actor (1954–2018)

Ma Ju-feng (Chinese: 馬如風; pinyin: Mǎ Rúfēng; Pe̍h-ōe-jī: Má Jû-hong; 16 March 1954 – 29 July 2018) was a Taiwanese actor.

Ma made his television debut in 1980, and won a Golden Bell Award for most promising newcomer the next year. In 2017, paralysis began affecting his extremities and Ma later suffered a stroke. While on vacation to Nantou County in July 2018, Ma was sent to Chu Shang Show Chwan Hospital in Zhushan after collapsing in a bathroom. He died in hospital on 29 July 2018, aged 64.

A day after his death, a coroner and prosector based in Nantou County determined that Ma had died of natural causes. Ma's funeral was held in his hometown of Keelung.

Ma was married, and had three children.

== Selected filmography ==
- The Spirits of Love (2006–2008)
- Unique Flavor (2006–2007)
- Feng Shui Family (2012–2014)
