= Fon Cin =

Taiwanese actress

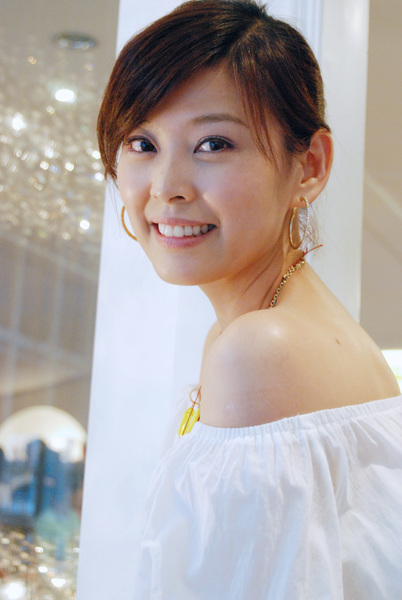
- Fon Cin in 2008
- Born: Chang Shu-ching (張淑菁); 6 August 1972 (age 54); Taipei County, Taiwan
- Occupations: Actress, television host
- Spouse(s): unnamed (m. 1995; div. 1996) Lee Cheng-chung (m. 2015)
- Children: 1 daughter -> born in 1996
- Musical career
- Also known as: Daisy Fon; Daisy Fong; Daisy Fang; Daisy Chang; Fang Xin

Chang Chiao-hui (born Chang Shu-ching on 6 August 1972), best known by her stage name Fon Cin (Chinese: 方馨; pinyin: Fāng Xīn), is a Taiwanese actress.

Fon Cin is best known for her roles in many long-running Hokkien-language soap operas like Taiwan Tornado, The Spirit of Love, Mom's House, Night Market Life & Spring Flower. She married Lee Cheng-Chung and they had a daughter (ex-husband's child).

== Filmography ==
=== Movies ===
| Year | Title | Role | Notes |
|---|---|---|---|
| 2023 | U Motherbaker 我的婆婆怎麼把oo搞丟了 | Wonder Woman 神力女超人 | |
| 2023 | Love Fool 我最愛的笨男人 | | |

=== TV shows ===
| Year | Title | Role | Notes |
|---|---|---|---|
| 2018-2021 | Girl's Power series 女力報到 | Fang Qiaoqing 方喬青 | |
| 2022 | Life is Beautiful 美麗人生 | Xu Mian 許勉 | |
| 2023 | Best Interest 2 我的婆婆怎麼把oo搞丟了 | Huang Jiayu 黃嘉玉 | |
| 2023 | Define Your Own Success 追分成功 | Zhou Xiumin 周秀敏 | |
