= Imperfect (2012 film) =

- Directed by: Steve Cheng
- Produced by: Li Nanxing
- Starring: Liu Kai Chi; Li Nanxing; Chiang Tsu-ping; Ian Fang; Kimberly Chia; Edwin Goh; Xavier Ong
- Music by: Alex Oh
- Production companies: Cornerstone Pictures; Mm2 Entertainment; Clover Films
- Distributed by: Golden Village Pictures
- Release date: August 30, 2012 (Singapore); (NC16 version)
- Running time: 96 min
- Country: Singapore
- Languages: Mandarin Chinese, dialects

Imperfect (traditional Chinese: 我們都不完美; simplified Chinese: 我们都不完美; pinyin: wǒ men doū bù wán měi; lit. 'We Are All Not Perfect') is a 2012 Singapore action film, directed by Steve Cheng, produced by Li Nanxing and starring Liu Kai Chi, Li and Chiang Tsu-ping. It was officially released in cinemas on 30 August 2012, in Singapore.

== Plot ==
After getting into a teen brawl to protect his friend, Zach, one night while watching a Getai performance, Jianhao gets sent to a Boys' Home for six months. He decides to start afresh, working hard to retake his O-levels with the help of his girlfriend Shan Shan. His mother, Huifang, arranges for him to help out in her stall at Bugis Street. However, due to his loyalty to his "brother" Zach, he follows him to join a triad gang, Yi Ren Tang, led by Zhihua to get protection against a rival gang, Gang 660, which was run by their enemy, Alex's father, Guodong.

One day, during a fight between Gang 660 and Zach, Square and Jianhao, Zach uses a brick to hit Alex's head. As a result, Alex ends up in a vegetative state, and dies soon after. Guodong promises to take revenge for his son. The boys become fugitives overnight, running away from Guodong and the police. Huifang seeks Zhihua's help, revealing that Jianhao is actually his biological son which she refused to abort 17 years ago. Huifang begs Zhihua to save Jianhao. Zhihua agrees, and manages to find Jianhao. He wants to send him overseas to escape. However, before Jianhao sets off, Guodong and his gang finds both Jianhao and Zhihua, entering into yet another bloody fight. This time, Zhihua gets stabbed to death by Guodong. The police arrive in time just before Guodong is about to hit Zach with a metal pipe. Guodong, Zach and Jianhao get arrested and sent to jail. Jianhao is released before Zach, and decides to turn over a new leaf, with the encouragement of his mother, sister Xin Xin and Shan Shan.

== Cast ==
- Edwin Goh as the main protagonist, He Jianhao, a teenager determined to make good from his past mistakes after serving his term at the Boys' Home, but succumbs to joining a triad gang because of peer pressure.
- Ian Fang as Zach, Jianhao's close friend.
- Kimberly Chia as Shan Shan, Jianhao's soon-to-be girlfriend.
- Elizabeth Lee as Izzy, Zach's girlfriend (they broke up in the end).
- Phua Yida as Square, Jian Hao and Zach's close friend.
- Xavier Ong as Alex, the son of Wang Guodong.
- Li Nanxing as Zhihua, the leader of the triad gang Zach joins, died after being killed by Wang Guodong at the last fight.
- Liu Kai Chi as Wang Guodong, the leader of a rival gang.
- Chiang Tsu-ping as Jian Hao's single mother, He Huifang.
- Patrick Lee as Brother Nuo, a retired triad gang leader
