= Spring Flower =

- 春花望露
- Genre: Romance; Revenge; State Politics; Office Politics; Family
- Directed by: Chen Zhu Huang
- Opening theme: 1) 另一种乡愁 by 许富凯; 2) 青春 by 丁姵均; 3) 释怀 by 郭婷筠 & 曹雅雯; 4) 爱情敢会当参详 by 许富凯; 5) 思念的歌 by 曹雅雯; 6) 犹原爱着你 by 蔡佳麟; 7) 相思伴月 by 林孟宗
- Ending theme: 1) 真爱无价 by 张秀卿 & 庄振凯; 2) 望露的春花 by 朱海君; 3) 痴情女 by 谢宜君; 4) 你不孤单 by 龙千玉; 5) 我做你的靠山 by 翁立友
- Country of origin: Taiwan
- Original languages: Hokkien; Mandarin
- No. of episodes: 341 (original run); 930 (overseas version)

Production
- Running time: 120–150 minutes

Original release
- Network: Formosa Television
- Release: 14 March 2016 – 7 April 2017

Spring Flower (Chinese: 春花望露) is a Taiwanese Hokkien television series that airs on Formosa Television in Taiwan. The producers received funding from the Government Information Office to produce the series in high definition.

== International Broadcast ==
=== Singapore broadcast ===
Due to local broadcast laws prohibiting radio or television broadcasts in Chinese dialects, the show was dubbed into Mandarin when it aired on Singapore's MediaCorp Channel 8, thus making it the first channel to broadcast the show in Mandarin. The show is currently aired on Mediacorp Channel 8 on weekends from 7pm-10pm or 7pm-9pm with English and Chinese subtitles and ended its run on 12 March 2022.

Repeat Telecast (2021)

It repeated its run from 8 June 2021 at 10.30 am – 12.30 pm timeslot from Monday to Thursday on Mediacorp Channel 8 with English and Chinese subtitles and concluded its repeat telecast on 14 September 2023.

== Music ==
=== Opening Theme Songs ===
Order	Song Name	Lyricist	Composer	Vocalist	Broadcast Period	Broadcast Episodes
1	另一種鄉愁	晨 曦	谷村新司	許富凱	14 March 2016－18 March 2016	Episode 1～Episode 5
2	青春	鄭喬安	鄭喬安	丁姵均	21 March 2016－27 May 2016	Episode 6～Episode 55
3	釋懷	謝家銘	陳緯倫	郭婷筠、曹雅雯	30 May 2016－19 August 2016	Episode 56～Episode 115
4	愛情敢會當參詳	林東松	林東松	許富凱	22 August 2016－11 November 2016	Episode 116～Episode 175
5	思念的歌	曹雅雯	曹雅雯	曹雅雯	14 November 2016－6 February 2017	Episode 176～Episode 235
6	猶原愛著你	陳偉強	陳偉強	蔡佳麟	7 February 2017－1 May 2017	Episode 236～Episode 295
7	相思伴月	林東松	林東松	林孟宗	2 May 2017－4 July 2017	Episode 296～Episode 341

=== Trailer Song ===
Order	Song Name	Lyricist	Composer	Vocalist	Broadcast Period	Broadcast Episodes
1	另一種鄉愁	晨 曦	谷村新司	許富凱	14 March 2016－2 July 2017	Episode 1～ Episode 339

=== End Theme Songs ===
Order	Song Name	Lyricist	Composer	Vocalist	Broadcast Period	Broadcast Episodes
1	真愛無價	石國人	石國人	張秀卿、莊振凱	14 March 2016－17 June 2016	Episode 1～Episode 70
2	望露的春花	石國人	石國人	朱海君	20 June 2016－23 September 2016	Episode 71～Episode 140
3	癡情女	石國人	石國人	謝宜君	26 September 2016－13 January 2017	Episode 141～Episode 220
4	你不孤單	LINDA	江志豐	龍千玉	16 January 2017－10 April 2017	Episode 221～Episode 280
5	我做你的靠山	瑋 瑋	孔 鏘	翁立友	11 April 2017－3 July 2017	Episode 281～Episode 340
