= The Kinmen Bombs =

- Film poster
- 八二三炮戰 (Taiwan) 金門砲戰 (Hong Kong)
- Directed by: Ting Shan-hsi
- Written by: Ting Shan-hsi
- Produced by: Hsu Hsin-chih
- Starring: Ko Chun-hsiung; Michael Huang; Charlie Chin; 李小飛
- Cinematography: Chang Hui-kung; Liao Pen-jung
- Edited by: Wang Chi-yang
- Music by: Yu Kuo-Hsien
- Production companies: Central Motion Picture Corporation; Silver Bird Films Ltd. Kuomintang Central Committee
- Distributed by: Central Motion Picture Corporation
- Release date: 9 October 1986 (Taiwan)
- Running time: 108 minutes
- Country: Taiwan
- Budget: $30,000,000
- Box office: $10,096,437

The Kinmen Bombs (Chinese: 八二三炮戰; lit. 'August 23 Shelling War') is a 1986 film based on the Second Taiwan Strait Crisis. It was directed and written by Ting Shan-hsi. Prior to its release, the Republic of China Armed Forces devoted all their energy to filming the film, deployed a great deal of manpower and equipment to cooperate, and in some scenes, mobilized more than 300,000 people.

The film is about ROC officers and soldiers working together to resist the shelling of the Communist army in Kinmen in 1958, "to defend the last territory of the mainland" (保衛大陸的最後疆土).

== Plot ==
On August 23, 1958, the Communist army launched a crazy attack without warning, and strong artillery fire caused the island of Kinmen to fall into a sea of fire immediately, causing serious casualties among ROC soldiers and Kinmenese civilians.

In this critical situation, under the command of Colonel 齊良臣, the commanding officer of the artillery, he immediately ordered all soldiers to fight back, destroyed the enemy's critical military goals one after another, and conducted a 'Thunder Plan' (轟雷計劃) to support the war front by secretly supplying 8-inch large artillery to break the war crisis and subdue the enemy's saturation to break the crisis.

Finally, after all the soldiers worked together and hurried day and night, the huge Artillery was installed smoothly. At that moment, the thunder roared, shaking the sky and the ground, which led the Communist army to stop the attack, and eventually the Communist army gave up trying to force 300,000 troops to land.

== Cast ==
- Ko Chun-hsiung
- Michael Huang
- Charlie Chin
- 李小飛
