= Wang Shih-hsien =

Taiwanese singer and actor

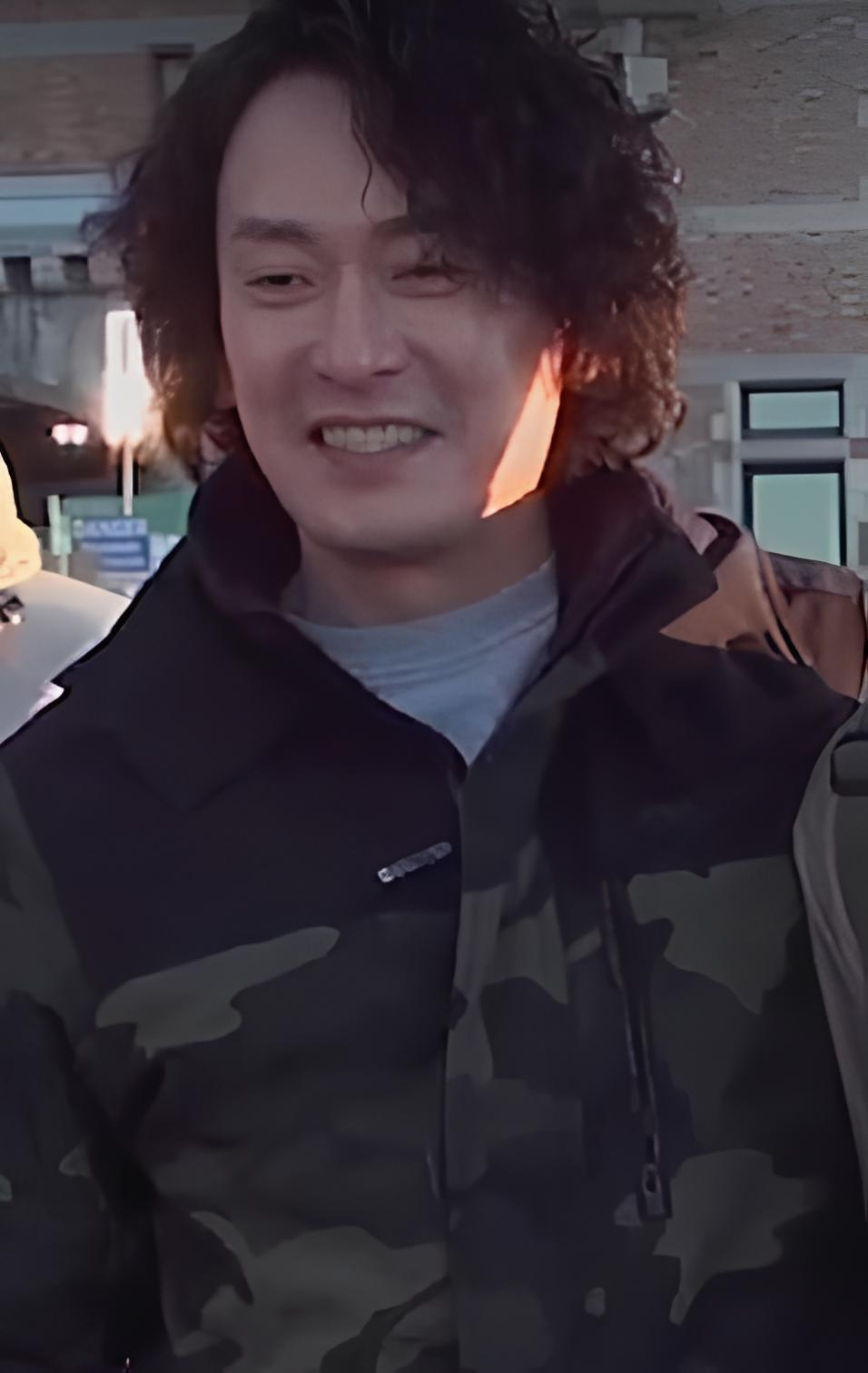
- Wang in 2020
- Born: 11 February 1968 (age 58)
- Other names: Jason Wang, Wang Shi-xian
- Occupations: Singer; actor
- Years active: 1987–present
- Children: 2
- Musical career
- Genres: Mandopop

Chinese name
- Chinese: 王識賢
Transcriptions
Standard Mandarin
- Hanyu Pinyin: Wang Shih-Sian
Southern Min
- Hokkien POJ: Ông Sek-hiân

Wang Shih-hsien (Chinese: 王識賢; pinyin: Wáng Shíxián; Pe̍h-ōe-jī: Ông Sek-hiân; born 11 February 1968) is a Taiwanese singer and actor.

== Career ==
As a singer, Wang won Best Taiwanese language performer at the 16th Golden Melody Awards. Wang has been nominated multiple times, including in 2008 and 2011, when he lost to Sodagreen and Huang Wen-hsing, respectively.

Wang starred in Niu Chen-zer's Monga and has also appeared in the television series The Unforgettable Memory, The Spirits of Love and Night Market Life.

== Personal life ==
Wang is married and has two children.

== Discography ==
Year	English title	Original title	Notes
1989		初戀海	
1990		浪子悲歌	
1991		全部的愛	
1992		離開	
1993		我甲別人不同款	
1995		啊！傷心的話	
1996		酒醉的恰恰	
1998		只要你越頭	
2000		難分難離	
2001		愛到無命不知驚	
2002		命中注定	
2003		一片天	
2004		情難忘	
2005		男人淚	
2006		愛你一千一萬年	
2007		堅強	
2009		醉中沙	
2009		足步天下	
2010		傷心手指	
2010		玄武英雄	
2012		一起去幸福	

== Filmography ==
=== Film ===
Year	English title	Original title	Role	Notes/Ref.
1997	Murmur of Youth	美麗在唱歌	Baker	
2010	Monga	艋舺	Wim-kian	
2012	My Dog Dou Dou	我的狗蚪蚪	Ah Ming	
2014	Second Chance	逆轉勝	Hsu Che-Yung	
2015	Murmur of the Hearts	念念	Boxing coach	
2018	Gatao 2 - Rise of the King	角頭2：王者再起	Ren	
2019	The Paradise	樂園	Wallace	
2020	Your Name Engraved Herein	刻在你心底的名字	Birdy (older)	

=== Television series ===
Year	English title	Original title	Role	Notes/Ref.
2004	The Unforgettable Memory	意難忘	Wang Shengtian	
2005	Life is Beautiful	美麗人生	Du Jiaqi	
2006	The Spirits of Love	愛	Fang Shixian	
2009	Night Market Life	夜市人生	Li Youzhi	
2015	Crime Scene Investigation Center／i Hero	C.S.I.C.鑑識英雄	Lin Sir	
2015	Taste of Life	甘味人生	Zhao Xinda	
2019	CSIC 2 / i Hero 2	鑑識英雄II正義之戰	Lin Sir	
2019	Dream Raider	獵夢特工	Chen Tienli	
2020–2024	The Victims' Game	誰是被害者	Chao Cheng-Kuan	
2023	Uncle	阿叔	Wang Wenchin	
2023	Dr. Lifesaver	生命捕手	Du Lesheng	
2024	Dr. Lifesaver 2	生命捕手2	Du Lesheng	
