= The Pawnshop No. 8 =

- Also known as: 第8號當舖
- Genre: Romance; Supernatural
- Based on: The Pawnshop No. 8 by Zita Law
- Directed by: Chen Chun-liang
- Starring: Alex To; Tien Hsin
- Country of origin: Taiwan
- Original language: Mandarin
- No. of episodes: 116

Production
- Producer: Kuo Chien-Hung
- Production location: Taiwan
- Production companies: TransWorld Production Co. Anhui Television (Mainland China)

Original release
- Release: 2003 – 2003

The Pawnshop No. 8 (also known as Pawnshop #8) is a 2003 Taiwanese romantic-supernatural television series that aired on Star Chinese Channel (now Star Entertainment Channel), based on Zita Law's novel of the same name. The series was produced by TransWorld Production Co., and licensed by ImaginAsian in the United States. The series stars Alex To and Tien Hsin, as well as Ben Lee, Chiang Tsu-ping, Remus Kam, Carol Cheng and Penny Lin.

The series was critically acclaimed and well received in numerous Asian countries, especially mainland China, as The Pawnshop No. 8 blends elements of Western religions such as Christianity with pre-modern and modern Chinese society.

== Premise ==
The namesake Pawnshop No. 8 is a fictitious pawnshop that took place inside a hidden dimension which was operated by Satan (referred in the show as a shadow), who oversees the entire management of the shop. Satan handpicked one master to operate the business, who is granted immortality, life-death predictability, and fortune, in exchange that the master must comply with Satan by following rules set forth by itself. The series started in the later years of Qing dynasty, and progressed towards the establishment of the Republic of China, and modern day Taiwan.

An urban legend was spread in the past, that customers who come across the pawnshop will get anything they desire for, providing that the customer is willingly doing so to pay an increasing price in each visit. The purpose of the pawnshop is that the Satan will tempt patrons to pawn items and valuables, ranging from body organs, sentience, luck, abilities, and especially souls, in exchange of their patron's items that desire, under a condition that the pawned goods would remain forfeited under normal circumstances. Satan had fought with the angels for eons, and revealed that the end goal is to collect the patron's soul through various ways of temptation and greed in particular.

== Plot ==
=== Arc 1 (episodes 1-39) ===
In 1515, mid-Ming dynasty, a master privately used a pawned item to restore his lover's sanity, contravening Satan's orders. Satan punished the master by immolating him and took his lover's life as well. Thereafter, the pawnshop was left vacant without a master until 1909. At that time, wealthy businessman Han Nuo was married with Yue Yin, and gave birth to a young boy named Han Lei. Satan found Han Nuo as its successor, but then he began to possess Han Lei and began tormenting his family until Han Nuo made an agreement to work with him. After Yue Yin's face was burnt in an accident caused by one of Satan's pranks, Han Nuo was forced to work with Satan, sacrificing his romance for Yue Yin's happiness in the process, and thus become the new master. Han also picked Ah Jing, a beggar who came to harass his residence earlier, as its new assistant.

Han's first patron was a businessman name Chen Dawei, who pawned his antique watch for 5,000 Harbin dollars (now Chinese dollar) to save his business, was later revealed to be Yue Yin's cousin-in-law later in the series. As years passed, several other patrons, such as Amy, a bartender, Sun Zhuo, a fashion designer and Han's maternal granddaughter, Wen Xin, an orphan and Sun's friend, Lin Sheng-tang, a technician, and Doctor Bai, a SARS researcher, also have come to visit the pawnshop but have paid ever increasing prices as a consequence of greed and later suffered serious consequences in reality, including Chen in particular, who ended up being a beggar. Han also have conflicts against Church Priest Bai, who could see Han and Jing when the two paid visit in the real world. Yue also aged and later die of old age, with Han, whose in spiritual form, paid a visit in her death bed.

Towards the end of the arc, Han discovered that he had used Sun's romance to regain his romance ability, and started that he fell in love with Jing in return. Jing accidentally broke one of the jars containing the soul of Gao Feng, and possesses it soul to one of the soulless assistant, who then enter the real world; Gao decide to pawn his soul to curse his girlfriend, Zhao Liang Yin, who in reality, its reincarnation was Amy. Both members also began to breach the pawnshop's protocols when Sun become is new assistance and granted access to the pawnshop, while Jinwas brought into assistance by the Priest Bai; After Sun was relieved of his assistance, Jing was returned to as an assistant, and while Jing and Han was planning for marriage, Satan came, having been aware about all the events and found that both Han and Jing had breached the rules in particular; Jing chose to take the punishment with Han together, therefore immolating both members and ending the arc.

== Cast ==
Character	Played By	Description
Han Nuo	Alex To	The son of a well-off family, Han Nuo is forced to give up his love and leave his family to take over Pawnshop No. 8. His cold and heartless appearance serves to conceal his inner compassion as well as his loneliness, helplessness, and repressed love.
Chen Jing	Tien Hsin	Commonly known as A-Jing, Chen Jing first appears as a young beggar girl. She voluntarily becomes the pawnshop's assistant and earns Dark Shadow's approval (much to Han Nuo's dismay). After a century of living together, she falls for her boss Han Nuo, not knowing that he has already been rendered unable to love. Throughout the series, A-Jing changes from a greedy beggar willing to kill for food and shelter to a lonely woman willing to die for love.
Sun Zhuo	Penny Lin	Sun Zhuo is an aspiring singer who pawns her romantic love in exchange for international fame. Upon receiving Han Nuo's unprecedented affection, she believes herself in love and assumes the feeling to be reciprocal. Her dream is to replace A-Jing and be with Han Nuo forever. She reveals her feelings on her deathbed, only to be told by Han Nuo that she is in fact his great-granddaughter. With all hope lost, she chooses to die of brain cancer at the age of 31 instead of pawning a sacred key for 50 additional years of life.
The Bai family	Ben Lee	Members of the Bai family are identical angels who appear to mortals in many forms in order to turn misguided souls into the hands of God. They will convince desperate people that life moves on and tell hopeless individuals that fate lies in their hands. They are considered the competition and biggest threat to Pawnshop No. 8. Nevertheless, A-Jing gets into an inexplicable relationship with John Bai, who becomes her closest friend and confidant.
Lu Yunyin	Cheng Chia-yu	Yunyin is a devout Catholic and the wife of Han Nuo. After her husband leaves, her friends and family have suggested that she should move on, but she remains firm in the belief that she and Han Nuo will one day be reunited. Fifty years later, on her deathbed, Han Nuo holds her hand and asks why it is that he traded his life and love for her happiness only for her to reject happiness whenever it comes. Yunyin replies that waiting for him is her happiness.
Gao Feng	Tou Chung-hua	A scholar from the Song dynasty, Gao Feng met and fell in love with Zhao Liangyin, a famous prostitute. He gave up his future to spend time with Liangyin, but was brutally rejected by his beloved the moment his money was gone. Faced with rejection and unable to cope with his anger, he went to Pawnshop No. 8 and pawned his soul in exchange for retaliation. 800 years later, he escapes from the pawnshop. After spending time with Liangyin's reincarnation, he realizes that everything was a misunderstanding. But it is too late. This girl, Amy, lives under his curse and will continue to do so for all of eternity. There is only one way to break it...
Amy	Chiang Tsu-ping	Amy is a nightclub worker with a history of abusive relationships and misfortunes in the workforce. She is plagued by constant nightmares and is also destined to die a horrifying death on her 29th birthday. Amy is the reincarnation of Zhao Liangyin, a prostitute from the Song dynasty, who fell in love with Gao Feng but forced out an act of betrayal in an attempt to motivate the latter to succeed. Gao Feng misunderstood her intentions and instead cursed her to remain a prostitute for all of eternity and never live past 29. Yet despite hardships and multiple reincarnations, Gao Feng remains the one and only in Amy's heart.
Chung Hsiao-chieh	Kimi Hsia	
Yang Wen-han	Lee Lee-zen	
Lin Kuan-hua	Michael Huang	
Gao Han	Remus Kam	The third-generation Pawnshop master, who succeeded Han beginning in the start of the second arc. Gao later demoted to assistant during the start of the third arc after Han returned to the Pawnshop and being reinstated as the status. Gao is the son of the Gao Feng and Amy, and was raised by Satan after Han's punishment, and was later become the manager of a business conglomerate called Empire.
Unnamed master	Wakin Chau	The first-generation master, only appeared in the very first episode of the series. The master had worked for an unknown amount of time prior to the start of the series, until in 1515 where he used one of the pawned items (the sanity of a client's son for 10,000 gold) to restore the sanity for his lover, Lanting. Satan then immolates the master for breaching rules, kicking off the premise of the series.
Satan	Unknown	Also called or referred to as the Shadow, is depicted as a cloaked figure resembling a grim reaper, also a personification of death. Satan oversees the management of the pawnshop and selects a master, with strict conditions to comply for the master in particular.

== Production ==
The Pawnshop No. 8 is an adaptation of an eponymous novel by Hong-Kong writer Zita Law. Principal photography began on May 13, 2003, without its star, Alex To; his arrival in Taiwan from his home in Hong Kong was delayed due to quarantine measures of the then-ongoing SARS outbreak.

== Reception ==
Wu Qizong, writing for the Min Sheng Bao newspaper, remarked that Alex To's and Chen Chia-yu's roles were challenging, as the same actors had to play the same character from age twenty to their seventies.

== Spinoff ==
In 2006-2008, Star Chinese Channel created a spinoff quiz game show titled The Bureau No.9 (Chinese: 第9號鏢局), hosted by Hsu Nai-lin, where contestants compete in an auction-based trivia of general knowledge questions for a grand prize of 1 million NTD. The show is based on the television series as well, with the game show set using a similar setting for the pawnshop.

== See also ==
- Deal with the Devil
- List of Taiwanese dramas from 2000 to 2010
- The Witch's Diner, a 2021 South Korean drama, with a similar plot to The Pawnshop No. 8
