= National Taiwan College of Performing Arts =

Public college in Taiwan

- 國立臺灣戲曲學院
- Motto: 承先啟後 精益求精
- Type: Public
- Established: 1999; 27 years ago
- Affiliations: Wenshan Consortium of University Social Responsibility
- Location: No. 177, Section 2, Neihu Road, Neihu District, Taipei, Taiwan; 25.0819°N 121.5870°E
- Website: Official website (in Chinese)

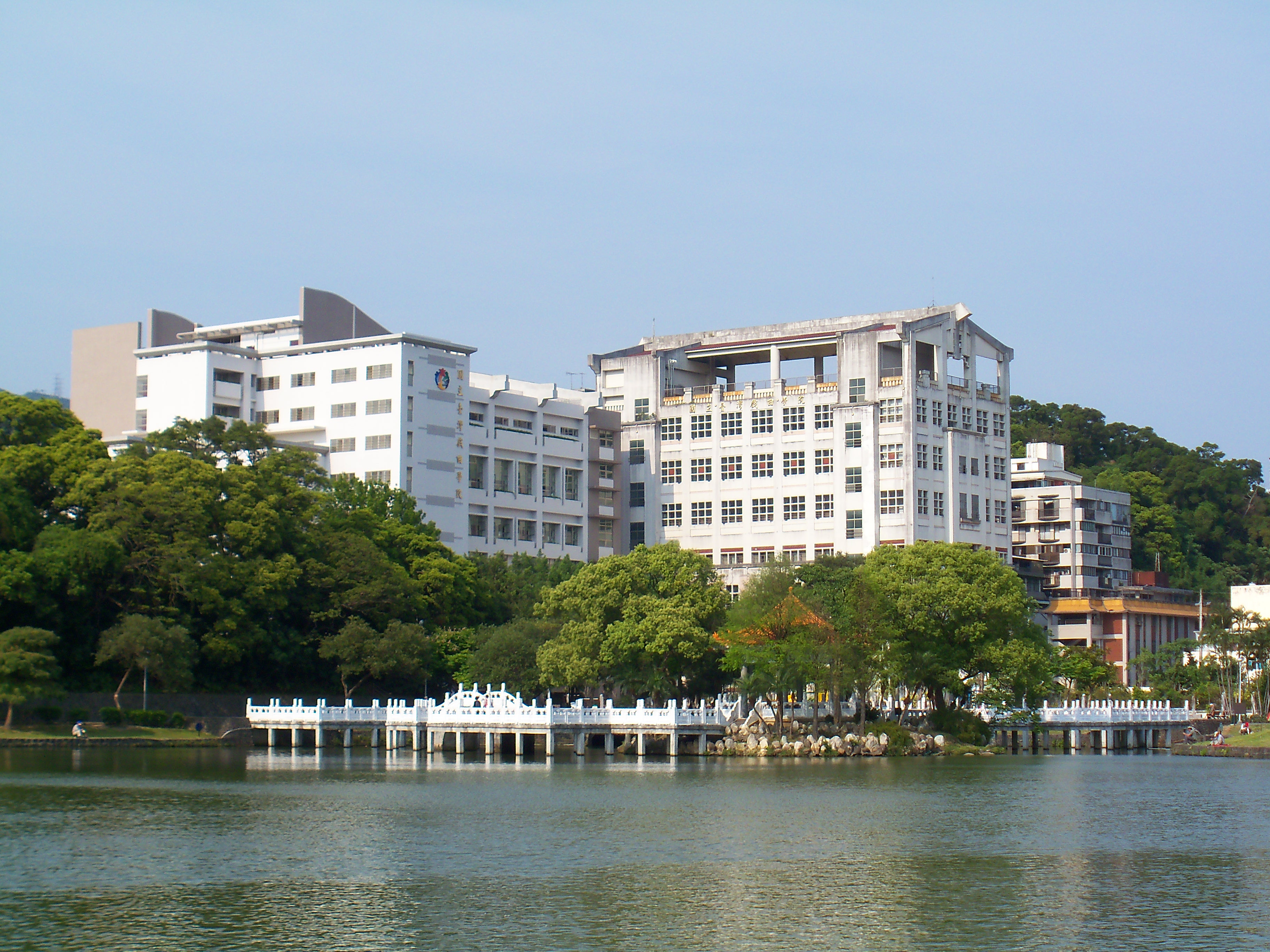
NTCPA Neihu Campus

National Taiwan College of Performing Arts
- Simplified Chinese: 国立台湾戏曲学院
- Traditional Chinese: 國立臺灣戲曲學院
Transcriptions
Standard Mandarin
- Hanyu Pinyin: Guólì Táiwān Xìqǔ Xuéyuàn
Southern Min
- Hokkien POJ: Kok-li̍p Tâi-oân Hì-kio̍k Ha̍k-īⁿ

The National Taiwan College of Performing Arts (NTCPA; Chinese: 國立臺灣戲曲學院; Pe̍h-ōe-jī: Kok-li̍p Tâi-oân Hì-kio̍k Ha̍k-īⁿ) is a public college located in Taipei, Taiwan.

The college offers undergraduate and graduate programs in various fields of performing arts, including drama, music, dance, and traditional Chinese performing arts. Students can choose from a wide range of programs, such as Acting, Directing, Playwriting, Dance, Vocal Performance, Instrumental Performance, Musicology, and Traditional Chinese Performing Arts.

The college also offers a number of interdisciplinary programs that allow students to combine their interests in different fields of the performing arts.

== History ==
It was known as Fu Sheng (Fu Xing Ju Xiao) or Lu Kwan Peking Opera school. Although called a Peking Opera school, students actually learned Taiwanese opera, sung in Hokkien dialect rather than Mandarin. Notable students included Lu Feng, Chiang Sheng, Charlie Chin, Philip Kwok, Angela Mao and James Tien who subsequently worked in the Hong Kong film industry.

On 1 July 1999, the National Fu Hsing Dramatic Arts Academy merged with the National Kuo Kuang Academy of Arts to establish National Taiwan Junior College of Performing Arts.

== Faculties ==
- Department of Jing Ju (for Peking opera)
- Department of Taiwanese Opera (for Taiwanese opera)
- Department of Hakka Opera (for Hakka opera)
- Department of Acrobatics and Dance
- Department of Traditional Music
- Department of Theater Arts

== Notable alumni ==
- Chiang Tsu-ping, actress and television host
- Cynthia Khan, actress
- Lin Mei-hsiu, actress and television host
- Lu Feng, actor and action director

== See also ==
- List of universities in Taiwan
