= Chen Mei-feng =

Taiwanese actress

MeiFen Chen Mei-feng
- 陳美鳳
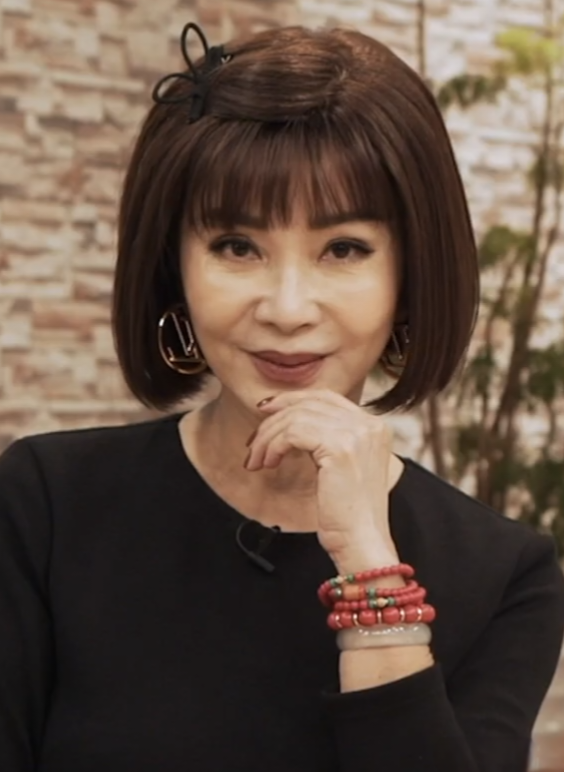
- Chen in 2019
- Born: Taiwan
- Other name: MeiFen
- Occupation: Actress

Chen Mei-feng (Chinese: 陳美鳳; Pe̍h-ōe-jī: Tân Bí-hông) or MeiFen is a Taiwanese actress. She was the female lead in The Spirits of Love and Night Market Life.
