= Chan Ya-wen =

Taiwanese Hokkien pop singer, lyricist and composer

- 詹雅雯
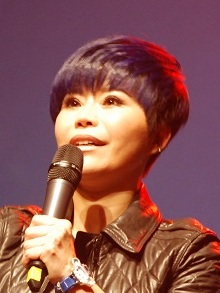
- Born: Chan Shu-chen 詹淑貞; 2 March 1967 (age 59); Yuanlin, Changhua County, Taiwan
- Occupation: Singer
- Years active: 1991–present
- Awards: Golden Melody Awards – 19th Golden Melody Awards; Life Highway (人生公路)

Chinese name
- Traditional Chinese: 詹雅雯
Transcriptions
Southern Min
- Hokkien POJ: Chiam Ngá-bûn
- Musical career
- Origin: Taiwan
- Genres: Hokkien pop
- Instrument: Vocals

Chan Ya-wen (Chinese: 詹雅雯; Pe̍h-ōe-jī: Chiam Ngá-bûn; born 2 March 1967 in Changhua, Taiwan) is a Taiwanese Hokkien pop singer, lyricist, and composer. She won the 2008 Golden Melody Award for Best Dialect Female Artist. After winning a singing contest with her sister, a producer from Yalle Rocrods signed them on as the Sakura Sisters, catapulting them to fame for their covers of classic Taiwanese Hokkien pop songs. Chan then made her solo debut in 1991, writing all the songs herself; it was a success with over 300,000 copies officially sold and up to a million including pirated versions. Chan ahs been called "the night market's Jody Chiang" due to her popularity, particularly in Southern Taiwan and working class Hokkien speakers. In 2021, she was diagnosed with Parkinson's Disease, with her left hemisphere being atrophied.

== Discography ==
- 1991: 是你傷我的心
- 1992: 用心肝飲的酒
- 1992: 生死戀
- 1992: 心の台日演歌集1
- 1993: 酒中情
- 1993: 心の台日演歌集2
- 1994: 孤單酒
- 1994: 心の台日演歌集3
- 1994: 心の台日演歌集4
- 1995: 心の台日演歌集5
- 1995: 心の台日演歌集6
- 1994: 我已經愛到你
- 1995: 為你心碎心痛心悶啦
- 1996: 你過了好否
- 1997: 正確的路
- 1998: 一切攏是命
- 1998: 七夕情(歷年金選一)
- 1998: 放祙落彼個人(歷年金選二)
- 1999: 命運不是咱決定(歷年金選三)
- 1999: 愛你這深
- 2000: 人生舞台
- 2001: 感謝你無情
- 2003: 迎新春
- 2003: 愛你這深(歷年金選四)
- 2004: 想厝的人
- 2004: 女人夢
- 2005: 今年一定會好過
- 2006: 是你對不起我
- 2007: 情人保重
- 2007: 人生公路: Life Highway
- 2008: 戀情海
- 2009: 底片
- 2011: 山伯英台
- 2012: 當店
- 2012: 感恩的花蕊
- 2013: 親親姊妹
- 2014: 北極星
- 2016: 何年何月再相逢
