= Long Qianyu =

- Born: Chiang Yu-man (江玉滿); Zhongzheng, Keelung, Taiwan
- Years active: 1987–present
- Spouse: Tsao Nan-ping (m. 1982; div. 1989)
- Children: 2

Chinese name
- Traditional Chinese: 龍千玉
- Simplified Chinese: 龙千玉
Transcriptions
Standard Mandarin
- Hanyu Pinyin: Lóng Qiānyù
- Musical career
- Also known as: Chiang Yu-chin (江玉琴); Linda Long; Linda Chiang
- Genres: Hokkien pop, Mandopop

Chiang Yu-man, better known by her stage name Long Qianyu, is a Taiwanese Hokkien pop singer. She has released 55 albums.
