= Formosa Television =

Taiwanese television station

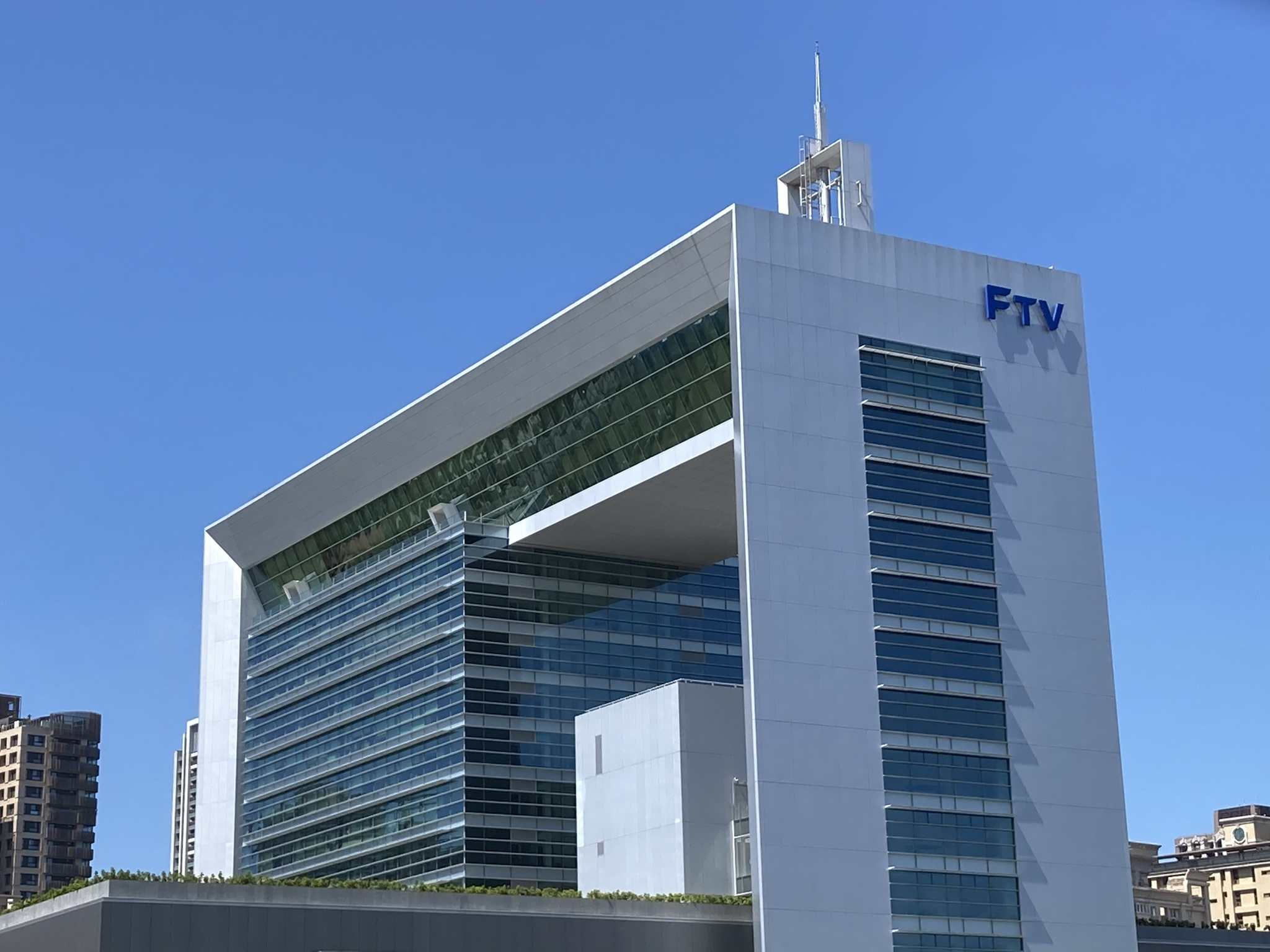
- Type: Free-to-air nationwide TV
- Branding: FTV
- Country: Taiwan
- First air date: June 11, 1997
- Availability: Taiwan
- Founded: March 27, 1996 by Chai Trong-rong
- Broadcast area: Worldwide
- Owner: Formosa Television Inc.
- Official website: www.ftv.com.tw

Formosa Television
- Traditional Chinese: 民間全民電視公司
- Literal meaning: Civilian Television Company
Transcriptions
Standard Mandarin
- Hanyu Pinyin: Mínjiān Quánmín Diànshì Gōngsī
Southern Min
- Hokkien POJ: Bîn-kan Chôan-bîn Tiān-sī Kong-si

Abbreviated Name
- Traditional Chinese: 民視
Transcriptions
Standard Mandarin
- Hanyu Pinyin: Mínshì
Southern Min
- Hokkien POJ: Bîn-sī

Formosa Television (Chinese: 民間全民電視公司; pinyin: Mínjiān Quánmín Diànshì Gōngsī; Pe̍h-ōe-jī: Bîn-kan Chôan-bîn Tiān-sī Kong-si) is a television station based in New Taipei City, Taiwan.

Established on March 27, 1996, FTV began broadcasting on June 11, 1997 as the first free-to-air television station established without direct relationship to a political party or the Taiwanese government. On May 24, 2004, FTV was among the first free-to-air channels in Taiwan to switch from terrestrial analog signal to digital television.

== Programming ==
Because of the location of its headquarters, which is in an area where Taiwanese Hokkien speakers are populous, FTV earned the reputation for being the first station in Taiwan to use that tongue in a majority of its programs, especially on its prime time newscasts.

FTV is considered to be part of the Pan-Green Coalition and was found to show "obvious political bias" in favor of the Democratic Progressive Party by a media watchdog in 2010.

== Content ==
On April 15, 2026, FTV reported that the suspect of a criminal case involving an 11-year-old boy found dead in Kyoto Prefecture was a Chinese national, citing a Japanese weekly magazine. However, the magazine did not publish such a report, and the police denied that the suspect was a foreign national. FTV removed the content and issued an apology on 17 April.

== Around-the-clock broadcasting ==
Midnight on January 1, 2018 marked Formosa Television's first day of 24-hour broadcasting, as Uni-President Enterprises Corporation celebrated its fiftieth anniversary with a New Year's Eve countdown broadcast.

== FTV channels ==
- FTV HD
- FTV News
- FTV One (formerly known as Follow Me TV)
- FTV Taiwan
- FTV Drama (Online-only; aired local drama series, mainly weeknight soaps)
- FTV Variety (Online-only; aired local entertainment shows)
- FTV Travel (Online-only; aired some Travel and Living shows)

== See also ==
- Television in Taiwan
- Pan-Green Coalition
