= Hsing Hui =

Taiwanese actress

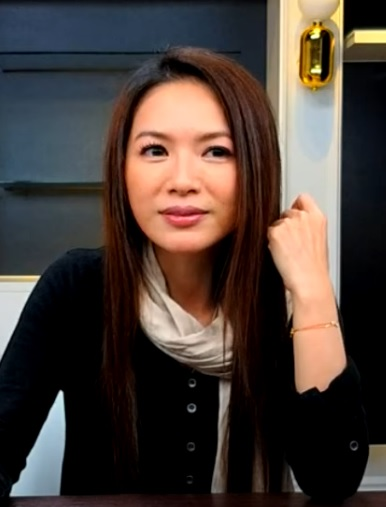
- Hsing Hui in December 2018
- Born: 10 December 1975 (age 50); Houbi Township, Tainan County, Taiwan (now Houbi District, Tainan City, Taiwan)
- Other names: Conie Tuan; Duan Xinghui; Conie Duan
- Education: Chungyu Institute of Technology
- Occupations: Actress, television host
- Years active: 1996-2013; 2017−present

Chinese name
- Chinese: 星卉
- Hanyu Pinyin: Xīng Huì

Hsing Hui (Chinese: 星卉; born Lai Ching-yin (Chinese: 賴靜茵) on 10 December 1975) is a Taiwanese actress. She is known for her roles in the television series Fiery Thunderbolt, Taiwan Tornado, Golden Ferris Wheel, My Family My Love, Lee Family Reunion, The Heart of Woman and Ordinary Love .

In 2004, she and her two brothers co-founded the bridal boutique, True Love Wedding.

== Filmography ==
=== Television series ===
Year	English title	Mandarin title	Role	Network	Notes
	Be With Me	伴我一生		Formosa TV	
1996	Ying Yan Mi Qing	鷹眼迷情		CTS	
1996	Hua Kai Hua Luo	花開花落		Da Ai TV	
1997	Taiwan Paranormal Events	台灣靈異事件-樂透奇談	A-chiao	CTS	
1997	Blue Cobweb	藍色蜘蛛網-四海女郎中	Yang Hsiu	TTV	
1998	Taiwan Diu Diu Tong	台灣丟丟銅		CTS	
1998	Lady Fortune Teller	算命的女人		CTS	
1998	Legends of the Earth God	土地公傳奇-雙龍奪珠	Wan'er	CTS	Cameo
1998	Stepmom	春天後母心		Formosa TV	
1998	Desire for Affection	深情-孤女的願望		Formosa TV	
1998	Scandal Crisis	桃色危機		Formosa TV	
1998	Yamas of the Ten Courts	十殿閻君	Lin Chiu-fen	Formosa TV	
1999	Hong Chen Ji Shi Bu	紅塵記事簿		Super TV	
1999	Totem Print	圖騰印		CTS	
1999	Taiwan Ghost Stories	台灣怪談-人鬼大戰	Hsiao-yu	CTS	
1999	Theater of Surprise	驚奇劇場		CTS	
1999	The Mute and the Bride	啞吧與新娘		CTS	
1999	Bian Lian Lao Ba	變臉老爸		Da Ai TV	
1999	Prosperity in Heaven	富貴在天	Li Shu-chen	Formosa TV	
1999	The Love Eterne	七世夫妻之梁山伯與祝英台	Chiu-chu	Formosa TV	
1999	Qin Qi Bu Ji Jiao	親戚不計較		Formosa TV	
1999	Yi Zhi Cao Yi Dian Lu	一枝草一點露		Formosa TV	
2000	Mazu	媽祖-姻緣花	Pai Hsin-hui	CTS	
2000	Ah Bian and Ah Jane	阿扁與阿珍		SET Taiwan	
2000	Accompany Me Through Life	伴阮過一生	Pan Ya-hui	SET Taiwan	
2000	The Legend of Nine Dragons	九龍傳說	Fu-jung	SET Taiwan	
2000	Nine Refers to the Bride	九指新娘	Yueh-hua / Yueh-mei	SET Taiwan	
2000	Jiang Xin Bi Xin	將心比心	Wang Ming-hui	Formosa TV	
2000	Big Foot	大腳阿媽	Hsiu-mei	Formosa TV	
2001	The Legend Of Taiwan	戲說台灣-人蛇郎君	Hsiu-lien	SET Taiwan	
2001	Taiwan Ah Cheng	台灣阿誠	Yeh Ming-yu	SET Taiwan	
2002	Fiery Thunderbolt	台灣霹靂火	Ho Mei-ling	SET Taiwan	
2003	The Liar Ah Chi	白賊七		Formosa TV	
2004	Taiwan Tornado	台灣龍捲風	Huang Chih-han	SET Taiwan	
2005	Hai Shi Shan Meng	海誓山盟	Yang Chia-wen	TTV	
2005	Golden Ferris Wheel	金色摩天輪	Chen Hua	SET Taiwan	
2006	The Amazing Strategist Liu Bo Wen	神機妙算劉伯溫-皇城龍虎鬥	Lin Yueh-yao	TTV	
2008	Tian Shang Sheng Mu Mazu	天上聖母媽祖	Chiang Hsiu-lien	TTV	
2008	The Legendary Matsu	懷玉傳奇 千金媽祖	Chen Fu-jung / Lien Hua Chen Chun	TTV	
2008	Love Above All	真情滿天下	Tang Yu-hsin	SET Taiwan	Episode 264-266
2009	Jia Qing Jun You Taiwan	嘉慶君遊台灣	Li Hui-chun	TTV	
2009	My Family My Love	天下父母心	Lin Ruyu	SET Taiwan	Episode 1-216
2010	Lee's Family Reunion	家和萬事興	Ye Yimei	SET Taiwan	Episode 133-274
2011	The Other Hands	牽手	Man-li	SET Taiwan	Episode 222-239
2011	The Legend Of Taiwan	戲說台灣-天公點狀元	Li Hsuan-nu	SET Taiwan	
2012	The Heart of Woman	天下女人心	Chen Hsiao-hsiao / Sun Pao'er's spirit	SET Taiwan	Episode 1-93
2013	Ordinary Love	世間情	Jin Pei Fang (Pei Pei)	SET Taiwan	Episode 2 onwards
2017	Taste of Life	甘味人生	Du Wei Wei	SET Taiwan	Episode 1-232
2017	Breeze in The Love River	春風愛河邊	Hsu Jing-jing	CTS	
2018	A Traditional Story of Taiwan	戲說台灣-媽祖渡情劫	Mazu	SET Taiwan	
2020	A Traditional Story of Taiwan	戲說台灣-潛水媽挽胭脂蟲	Mazu	SET Taiwan	
2021	Proud of You	天之驕女	Liang You-qing	SET Taiwan	
2023	On Our Way	搜尋者	Lin Zi-jing	Da Ai Television	Cameo
2023	The Sister	進擊的姐姐		EBC Drama	

=== Variety show ===
English title	Mandarin title	Network	Notes
Friday Chiang Bai Le	周五強百樂	Formosa TV	Host
Good Fortune	好運旺旺來	CTS	Co-host
Modern	摩登蛋頭族	CTS	Host
Taiwan Tales	台灣傳奇	Da Di Channel	Co-host
Close Encounters of the Third Kind	第三類接觸	GTV	Host
