= My Daughters =

- Genre: Idol Drama - City, Love, Ethics
- Based on: Parents' Love
- Written by: Ye Fengying, Zhang Yajun, Ke Dun screenwriter group
- Directed by: Shen Yi, Zhou Guodong
- Starring: Tang Yan, Qi Wei, Zhang Meng, Qiu Ze, Chen Chuhe, Xu Zhengxi
- Voices of: Qiao Shiyu, Ji Guanlin, Qiu Qiu, Bian Jiang, Chen Hao, Zhang Jie
- Opening theme: "The Rainbow You Painted" by Jiang Yang
- Ending theme: "Love You Too Much" by Qi Wei
- Country of origin: China
- Original language: Mandarin
- No. of episodes: 80

Production
- Producer: Meng Xue
- Production locations: Xiamen, Beijing
- Cinematography: Zhu Siqun, Li Jun
- Editors: Liu Hua, Yu Hui
- Production companies: Shanghai Keton Culture Media Co., Ltd., Shanghai Syndicate Film and Television, Mengtian Culture

Original release
- Network: Anhui Television
- Release: January 22 – March 4, 2011

My Daughters (Mainland Chinese title: 夏家三千金), also known as Get Love Back in Taiwan (Taiwanese title: 把爱抢回来), is a Chinese urban idol drama that premiered in 2011. It is a remake of the long-running Taiwanese vernacular drama Parents' Love, which began airing in 2009. Directed by Taiwanese directors Shen Yi and Zhou Guodong, and starring Tang Yan, Qi Wei, Zhang Lemon, Qiu Ze, Chen Chuhe, and Xu Zhengxi, the show follows three families and their relationship, and tells the story of emotional entanglement between three sisters.

The series officially started being filmed in Xiamen on 5 June 2010 and was transferred to Beijing on 3 August before closing on 5 October. On 27 August 2012, the series was broadcast on CCTV-8 in the afternoon slot.

The series is produced by the same syndication company as The love is waking up and Love Comes Back, which are collectively known as the "Love Trilogy Series". These two shows, however, are both romance dramas, and are not related to the plot of My Daughters.

== Plot ==
Xia Zheng Song's three daughters are emotionally entangled with two men. Xia YouShan (Qi Wei), a fashionable but arrogant young woman, falls in love with an architect named Zhong Haotian (Chen Chuhe), but is repeatedly frustrated by his ordinary girlfriend. The other is a kind and filial daughter, Yang Zhenzhen (Zhang Lemon), who has suffered a lot to accompany her single mother, but is the "stray" daughter of a real estate company boss, and has since been forced to start a battle for affection and love with another woman.

== Show times ==
The following times are based on local time (UTC+8)

Film title	Channel	Location	Date of broadcast	Time of broadcast
My Daughters	Anhui Television	China	January 22, 2011	Broadcast at 19:30 every night; ended on March 4. Broadcasting was suspended on February 1 for the broadcast of Songs of the Prosperous Age - Anhui Satellite TV 2011 Spring Festival Gala.
My Daughters: Love is True, Good, and Beautiful	Shenzhen TV	China	April 10, 2011	Aired in the afternoon
My Daughters: Love is True, Good, and Beautiful	Qinghai Satellite TV	China	April 17, 2011	19:30 every night
My Daughters: Love is True, Good, and Beautiful	Yunnan Satellite TV	China	April 19, 2011	19:30 every night
My Daughters: Love is True, Good, and Beautiful	Dragon TV	China	April 25, 2011	Three episodes were broadcast daily in the afternoon.
My Daughters: Love is True, Good, and Beautiful	Sichuan Satellite TV	China	May 12, 2011	Aired in the afternoon.
My Daughters: Love is True, Good, and Beautiful	Tianjin Satellite TV	China	May 17, 2011	Aired in the afternoon.
My Daughters: Love is True, Good, and Beautiful	Jiangxi Satellite TV	China	June 22, 2011	Two episodes were broadcast continuously at 23:00 every night.
My Daughters: Love is True, Good, and Beautiful	Liaoning Satellite TV	China	August 16, 2011	Four episodes were broadcast daily in the morning.
My Daughters: Love is True, Good, and Beautiful	Shandong Satellite TV	China	November 22, 2011	Aired in the afternoon.
My Daughters: Love is True, Good, and Beautiful	Heilongjiang Satellite TV	China	October 1, 2011	Daytime 8:00-18:00, 11 consecutive episodes.
My Daughters: Love is True, Good, and Beautiful	CCTV-8	China	August 27, 2012	Aired in the afternoon.
My Daughters: Love is True, Good, and Beautiful	Shaanxi Television	China	July 16, 2013	Aired in the afternoon.
Get Love Back	SET Metro	Taiwan	May 19, 2011	Every Monday to Friday at 20:00; ended on February 4, 2012.

== Cast ==
=== Xiajia (Happiness Real Estate) ===
Actor	Role	Corresponding to the original role	Chinese dubbing	Taiwan Dubbing	Nickname / Relationship / Occupation
Huang WenHao	Xia Zhengsong	Cai Maosong (played by Liao Jun)	Shang Hong	Wei Boqin	Chairman of the Board of Directors of Happy Property Husband of Yu Liang and former lover of Yang Liu Adopted father of Xia Youshan Father of Yang Zhenzhen and Xia TianMei Father-in-law of Chung Ho Tin, Wah Sum, and Yan Ge Non-related maternal grandfather of Chung Ho On
Zheng Weili	Pretty	Wang Mingzhu (played by Liu MeiLing)	Li ShiRong	Lin MeiXiu	Wife of Xia Zhengsong Best sister and former love interest of Yang Liu Xia Tianmei's mother, Xia Youshan's adoptive mother Stepmother of Yang Zhenzhen Step-grandmother of Chung Ho-on Mother-in-law of Hao Tian, Hua Sen and Yan Ge Sister of Yu Chengwei
Zhang Meng	Xia Zhenzhen Yang Zhenzhen	For details, see Zhong's	For details, see Zhong's	For details, see Zhong's	For details, see Zhong's
Qi Wei	Xia Youshan Yu YouShan	Cai Youmei (played by Lian JingWen)	Ji GuanLin	Wei JingQi	Second daughter of the Xia Family Adopted daughter of Xia Zhengsong and Yu Liang Yu Chengwei's biological daughter Adopted sister of Yang Zhenzhen and Summer Beauty Adopted mother and later aunt of Chung Ho On Was in love with Chung Ho-Tin and hurt Yang Zhen Zhen for a while, but later changed her mind and became the wife of Wah Sum Killed Charmaine with a car Daughter of Wang Fugui and Gao Yanhong (Miao Keli), who married Chen Zhihui and had a son Yongkang in the original Parents' Love
Tang Yan	Xia TianMei	Cai YouHui (played by Athena Lee Yen)	Qiao Shiyu	Fu Qihui	Third daughter of the Xia family Xia Zhengsong, Pretty Young Daughter Xia Zhenzhen's half-sister Xia Youshan's titular sister Cheng Wei's niece Yan Ge's wife Xiao Yao and Yan Liheng's ex-girlfriends
Sun Mengquan	Ju's mother	－	Liu Qianhan	Wei Jingqi	Xia's nanny Loves Xia YouShan, Tianmei also loved Zhen-Zhen later
Li Donglin	Yu Cheng Wei	Wang Fugui	Zhang Wei	Li Shiyang	Yu Liang's brother Xia Youshan's Father Hua sen's father-in-law, Chung's ex-father-in-law Tian Mei's uncle, Zhen Zhen's nominal uncle Unable to raise Xia Youshan, he asked his sister and brother-in-law to adopt Xia Youshan. Imprisoned for kidnapping Zhen-Zhen

=== Zhong's ===
actor	Role	Corresponding to the original role	Chinese dubbing	Taiwan Dubbing	Nickname/Relationship/Occupation
Xu Meiling	Zhou Shumei	Wu Meiyun (Lin Peijun )	Jin Yan	Feng Meili	Zhong Haotian's mother Hates the poor and loves the rich
Chen Chuhe	Zhong Haotian	Chen Zhihui (Liu Zhihan )	Chen Hao	He Zhiwei	Son of Zhou Shumei Yang Zhenzhen's husband, Xia Youshan's ex-boyfriend Zhong Haowei's biological father, Zhong Anan's adoptive father Only son of the Zhong family, son-in-law of the Xia family In the original "Parents' Love", Chen Yongkang, who had a son with Cai Youmei, repented and reunited with Cai Youmei after he was released from prison
Zhang Meng	Yang Zhenzhen Xia Zhenzhen	Huang Leilei (Han Yu )	Qiu Qiu	Lin Meixiu	Illegitimate daughter of Xia Zhengsong and Yang Liu, known in episode 62 Divorced and remarried to Haotian A natural enemy of Hsia, but later reconciled Disrupts the wedding of Friendly and Haotian In the original "Parents' Love", she and Yang Jiahao have a daughter Huang Yiyi

=== Yan's House (Ceiling Peak Construction, Wannian Construction) ===
actor	Role	Corresponding to the original role	Chinese dubbing	Taiwan Dubbing	Nickname/Relationship/Occupation
Chang RuYan	Zhang Xiunian	Zhang Xiuzhi (played by Wang Manjiao)	Liao Jing	Wei Jingqi	Yan Minzhong's mother Mother-in-law of Hu Liansheng Grandmother of Yan Liheng and Yan Ge Chairman of the Board of Directors of Laminated Peak Construction
Wang Jianxin	Yan Minzhong	Li Minzhong (played by Yi Zheng)	Zhou Yang		Son of Zhang Xiunian Husband of Hu Liansheng Father of Yan Ge and Yan Liheng Chairman of Wannian Construction Company
Yang Jiemei	Hu Liansheng	Fang Lijun (Ding Guolin Played)	Liao Jing	Fu Qihui	Wife of Yan Minzhong Yan Liheng's mother Daughter-in-law of Zhang Xiunian
Qiu Ze	Yan Ge	Li Wenlong (Chen Guanlin Play)	Bian jiang	Wei BoQin	Xiao Yan (Strictly known to Xiu Nian and Xiao Jing) Grandson of Zhang Xiu-nian Son of Yan Minzhong Half-brother of Yan Liheng In love with Summer Beauty General Manager of Laminaria Construction Former fiancé of Sun Xiaojing Husband of Tianmei and son-in-law of the Xia family
Xu Zhengxi	Yan LiHeng	Li Yingjie (Lin Youxing Played)	Ajay	Li ShiYang	Grandson of Zhang Xiunian Son of Yan Minzhong and Hu Liansheng Half-brother of Yan Ge Former boyfriend of Xia Tianmei Chef, General Manager of Wannian Construction, owner of the restaurant

=== Yang's (chicken restaurant) ===
actor	Role	Corresponding to the original role	Chinese dubbing	Taiwan Dubbing	Nickname/Relationship/Occupation
Liu Ruiqi	Yang Liu	Huang Zhaodi (played by Fang Wenlin)	Liao Jing		Mother of Yang Zhenzhen Former lover of Xia Zhengsong Best friend of Xiu Luan and Yu Liang Wife of the owner of the chicken restaurant (deceased) In the original "Parents' Love", she is a bitter woman who, when she was young, thought that Cai Mao Song was her beloved, but she didn't know that he had a wife and child, and only found out that she was pregnant when she left Cai Mao Song.
Zhang Meng	Yang Zhenzhen Xia Zhenzhen	See Zhong Jia for details	See Zhong Jia for details	See Zhong Jia for details	See Zhong Jia for details

=== Huajia ===
actor	Role	Corresponding to the original role	Chinese dubbing	Taiwan Dubbing	Nickname/Relationship/Occupation
Zhang Danfeng	Hua Sen	Yang Jiahao (played by Wang Genghao) Jiang Datong (played by Huang Yurong) Chen Zhihui (played by Liu Zhihan)	Wang Kai	Li Shiyang	Xia YouShan's husband A psychiatrist who helps Zhen Zhen out of the darkness Yang Zhenzhen's previous love interest Fell in love with her husband while helping Zhen Zhen, and eventually married Xia YouShan. In the original Parents' Love, Yang Jiahao accidentally rescued Lei Le and then took Lei Lei and Yiyi to settle in the United States Jiang Datong liked Youmei, and at the time when the two almost got married, Chen Zhihui repented and reunited. In the end, Youmei passed away and she raised Yongkang alone.
Qi Wei	Xia Youshan Friendly	Xiajia	Xiajia	Xiajia	Xiajia

=== Tianjia ===
actor	Role	Corresponding to the original role	Chinese dubbing	Taiwan Dubbing	Nickname/Relationship/Occupation
Bian Yuan	Tian Hao	Shen Wenqing (played by Ding Liqi)	Yang Bo	Wei Boqin	Sun Xiaojing's secret lover and husband No matter how much money Sun Xiaojing got from the Yan family, she should leave with her and marry in the United States and finally give up under Xiaojing's persuasion
Zheng Luoxi	Sun Xiaojing	Sun Xiaojing (played by Ye Quanzhen)	Zhang Ai	Wei Jingqi	Yan Ge's ex-fiancée, wife of Tian Hao, has a deviant personality caused by childhood abuse and is aggressive and will stop at nothing to achieve her goals The murderer of Yan Ge's grandmother who suffered a stroke Eventually contracted an incurable disease The original Parents' Love in which the final lie comes true to get blood cancer and die

=== other actors ===
actor	Role	Corresponding to the original role	Chinese dubbing	Nickname/Relationship/Occupation
Feng Shaofeng	Zheng Yunhai	－	Shang Hong	Architect
Cao Yanyan	Xiu Luan	Zhao Liruan (Jin Wen Play)	Li Shirong	Yang Zhenzhen's mother's good sister who later recognized Yang Zhenzhen as her daughter
Wang Xiang	Xiao Yao	Timmy (played by Chen Xifeng)	Zhang Lei	Xia TianMei's ex-boyfriend, a liar
Li Shipeng	Xiao Chen	Zhou Gongcheng (played by He Guanying)	Jiang Guangtao	Yan Ge's assistant A happy couple with Liu Chunyan in the original Parents' Love
Sun Mengquan	Chrysanthemum	－	Liu Qianhan	Xia's nanny
Li Donglin	Cheng Wei	Wang Fugui (Wang Hao Play)	Zhang Wei	Xia Youshan's biological father
Zhou Ziyin	Liang Liang	Liu Chunyan (played by Lin Kewei)	Liu Qianhan	Zhang Xiunian's assistant, Sun Xiaojing's good sister The original Parents' Love in which he and Zhou Gong become a happy couple
Zhang Xiaoqi	Xiao Liang	Liu Tianfu (played by Li Yu)	Jiang Guangtao (part)	Xia Zhengsong's assistant
Xu Yue	Jian Ai	－	Zhang Ai; Li Shirong	Layer Peak staff
Wang Gang	Li Dong	－	Shang Hong	Chairman
-	Zhong Xin	－	Jiang Guangtao	Doctor, Liheng's friend
Lu Wensheng	Jerry	－	-	
Qu Yan	Zhu Ma	－	-	
Zhang Ye	Brother Niu	－	-	
Zhang Qihong	Shai Zi	－	-	
-	Gao Ming	－	Zhang Wei	Zhang Xiunian's friend
Shen Eonjeong	Yan GE	－	-	Strict childhood
Wu Minqian	Xia Youshan	－	-	Childhood Xia Youshan
He Hong	Zhong Haotian	－	Li Shirong; Qiao Shiyu	Childhood Zhong Haotian
Yu Sirui	Sun Xiaojing	－	-	Childhood Sun Xiaojing

=== TV drama songs ===
No.	Title	Lyrics	Music	to sing	Length
1.	"The rainbow you drew" (Opening song)	Ginger Cocoa	Liu Dajiang	Jiang Yang
2.	"Love you too much" (Ending theme)			Qi Wei
3.	"Hindsight" (episode)			Jiang Yang
4.	"The street alone" (episode)			Jiang Yang
5.	"Break up not necessarily break up" (episode)	Lin Yifeng		Shan Ye
6.	"Sweet wound" (episode)			Shan Ye
7.	"Almost" (episode)			Shan Ye
8.	"Persevere" (episode)			Ding Yu
9.	"Don't let you cry" (episode)			Ding Yu
10.	"Too perfect" (episode)			Xiao Wen
11.	"Detoxify memory" (episode)			Xiao Fei
12.	"Girl I loved" (episode)			Li Yifeng
13.	"Sign-on" (episode)			Siqin Gaoli
14.	"How come" (episode)			Gu Xiaoyu
15.	"You say" (episode)			Hu Wen
16.	"When love hasn't been spoken yet" (episode)			Yu Tongfei
17.	"Mom listen to me" (episode)			Lu Wen
18.	"Let go" (episode)			Lu Wen
19.	"Cruel excuse" (episode)			Lu Wen
20.	"Talk about love, talk about love" (episode)			Tang Yan, Zhang Meng, Qi Wei, Qiu Ze, Chen Chuhe

=== My Daughters (Part 1) ratings ===
play date	Episode	average ratings	ratings ranking
January 21	Premiere	0.73	3
January 22	1-2	0.82	3
January 23	3-4	0.86	2
January 24	5-6	0.75	4
January 25	7-8	0.74	
January 26	9-10	0.9	
January 27	11-12	0.867	2
February 9	35-36	1.08	2
February 10	37-38	1.146	1
February 11	39-40	1.17	1

- TV dramas or programs with higher ratings than this drama at the same time: Hunan Television (Happy Camp (TV series). Jiangsu Broadcasting Corporation (Happy mother-in-law and pretty daughter-in-la). Beijing Satellite Television (You are my brother).
- The object of the rating survey is CSM27 City Network， T Theanking object is Chinese provincial satellite TV channels
- Source：Sofry Media Research (page archive backup, Internet Archive)

=== Love is True, Good, and Beautiful (Part 2) ratings ===
My Daughters and Love is True, Good, and Beautiful are not the same drama. My Daughters is the original, and Love is True, gGood, and Beautiful is the sequel.

Love is True, Good, and Beautiful (Part 2) also reached an average of 1.71 for 40 episodes.

== Production staff ==
- Director: Shen Yi
- Assistant Director (assistant): Xing Jing, Gu Changfu
- Screenwriter: Ye Fengying
- Photography: Zhu Siqun, Li Jun
- Dubbing directors: Liao Jing, Zhang Wei
- Scene notes: Zhang Xiaoqi, Chen Xue

== Awards ==
- The drama won the 2011 Best Long Drama Award at the 2011 National Drama Awards

== The mainland version of Parents in the World ==
This play is a TV series based on the Taiwanese drama Parents' Love. The original version of Tian is pronounced in Taiwanese, and was later remade in mainland China. Therefore, this drama can be called the Mandarin version of Parents' Love.

Although The Three Thousand Golds of the Xia Family is a remake of the original Taiwanese TV series Parents' Love, and the plot and character settings are similar, there are differences between the two. In addition, some plots are in the Taiwan version, but there are no remakes in the Chinese version:

- In Parents' Love, when Li Yingjie was Cai Youhui's backup, he wanted to make Li Wenlong jealous. After Youhui and Wenlong got together, Zeng and Chen Zhiling and Ye Tianyi got together, and had a daughter with Zhiling. She also became pregnant with Ye Tianyi and aborted. In My Daughters, Yan Liheng, after breaking up with Xia Mei, he and Yan Yan (played by Qiu Ze) separated, and remained single without any other girlfriends. This shows that the Xia Family screenwriter did not pay enough attention and forgot the roles of "Parents' Love", Chen Zhiling and Ye Tianyi.

- In the drama Parents' Love, Ye Tianyi encountered a dispute between Chen Zhiling and Huang Leilei when he appeared on the stage. After getting up his feet cramped and he fell into the water. Ye Tianyi went into the water "Heroes Save the Beauty" Leilei, and later became friends with her. It also has Wujiaolian (Zhi Ling, Lei Lei, Ye Tianyi, Yang Jiahao/Jason, and Pan Zhenghong. This shows that the screenwriter of Xiajia did not pay enough attention and forgot many details
