= Vicky Tseng =

Taiwanese actress (born 1982)

- 曾莞婷
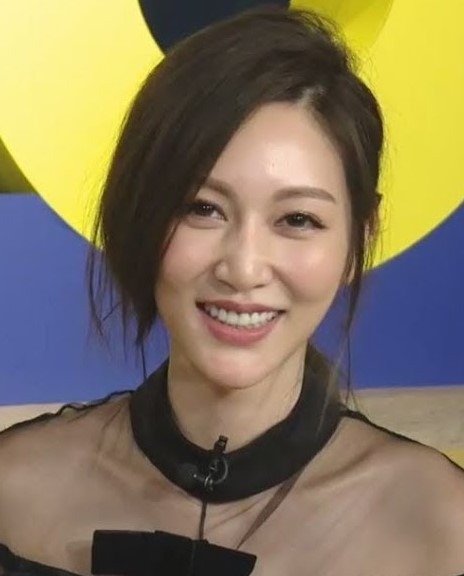
- Tseng in September 2019
- Born: Tseng Wan-ting; 5 May 1982 (age 44); Taipei, Taiwan
- Education: Shih Hsin University (MA)
- Occupation: Actress
- Years active: 1998–present

Vicky Tseng Wan-ting (Chinese: 曾莞婷; born 5 May 1982) is a Taiwanese actress who debuted as a child actress at the age of 16 with minor television roles. She began starring in sitcoms after 2006, including her role as Lin Ai-ting in Lee's Family Reunion (2010). Tseng is best known for her portrayal of the main villain Kuo Jia-jia in the Hokkien sitcom Ordinary Love (2013). Since then, she has continued her career in sitcoms, appearing in Taste of Life (2015) and 100%Wife (2018), while also expanding her work into other genres, including the coming-of-age series Youngsters On Fire (2021-2022), as well as the Netflix drama series Mom, Don't Do That! (2022) and Born for the Spotlight (2024).

== Early life and education ==
Tseng was born on 5 May 1982 in Taipei, Taiwan, and grew up in Taichung. Her father is a surveyor who operates his own surveying company, and Tseng described her family as "wealthy" during her childhood years. She has an elder brother, nine years her senior, who later pursued a career as a film director. Aspiring to become an actress from a young age, Tseng attended Hwa Kang Arts School to study performing arts, influenced by her brother. She was a classmate of musician Daniel Lee at Hwa Kang. She had her first acting experience when talent scouts from Public Television Service selected students from her school to serve as cast extras. When Tseng was in primary school, her family was scammed by relatives, leaving them with millions in debt, while her father's business also declined, resulting in poor financial conditions for the family. Unable to repay the debts, Tseng's mother briefly left the family, and she often faced debt collectors at their home starting from junior high school.

Though she initially aimed to study at Shih Hsin University after graduating high school, Tseng was forced to leave school and start working at age 16 to alleviate her family's financial struggles. She later moved to Hong Kong to work as a model and television host at the age of 19. When she was 23, her father was killed in a train accident while conducting a survey in Keelung. The accident prompted her to return to Taiwan, and Tseng described it as a turning point that made her the breadwinner of the family. She managed to repay the debts three years after landing recurring roles in sitcoms. In June 2024, Tseng graduated with a master's degree in communications management from Shih Hsin University, along with an outstanding achievement award, which she described as "[realising her] dreams".

== Acting career ==
=== Early roles (1998–2012) ===
Tseng made her acting debut as a child actress at the age of 16, taking on her first role as a maid in The Legends of Tudigong without any dialogue. She then appeared in numerous television series as a background actor and in minor roles, including Taiwan Horror Stories and Strokes of Life, before landing her first credited role in the 2001 TTV series Farbidden Love, where she portrayed a 20-year-old married woman despite being much younger. After several guest appearances, including in Spicy Teacher and In Love, Tseng received her first recurring role in the 2003 drama series The Pink Godfather. She continued to take on minor roles in series, such as the 2004 series The Unforgettable Memory and the 2009 series The Amazing Strategist Liu Bo Wen.

After starring in Amazing Strategist Liu Bo Wen, Tseng aimed to take on more sitcom roles to pursue a more stable income. For this reason, she began learning Hokkien to expand her opportunities in Hokkien sitcoms. In 2010, Tseng was cast in a recurring role as Tsin Mei-hsuan, a young woman suffering from domestic violence, in the drama series The Wife Wars. That same year, she began to receive public attention for her role as Lin Ai-ting in the sitcom Lee's Family Reunion. In 2011, Tseng landed her first leading role in the romance series Wives. She then starred in main roles in the 2012 television series Peak Times and Father's Wish, as well as a recurring role as Chao Yu-wei in the romance series The Heart of Woman.

=== Breakthrough with Ordinary Love (2013-Present) ===
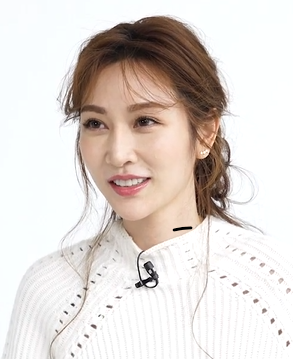
Tseng interviewed by Elle Taiwan in June 2019

In 2013, Tseng received her breakout role as Kuo Jia-jia, a selfish businesswoman who served as the main villain in the family drama Ordinary Love. Her performance was critically acclaimed and earned her widespread recognition, with TVBS describing the role as "iconic", and several of the character's lines becoming popular memes. It also established her as a character actress known for portraying villainous roles. She took on another villainous main role as Zhou Xiao-jing, a disfigured woman, in the 2015 drama series Taste of Life. In 2016, she made her feature film debut with a supporting role as Lin Mei-hsiu's character's sister in the comedy film The Big Power, and appeared in a recurring role in the drama series Stand By Me. The following year, Tseng made a cameo as one of Tia Lee's character's split personalities in the thriller film The Perfect Girl. She then starred as one of the main family members in the 2018 sitcom 100%Wife, and played a supporting role as an undergarment shop owner in the 2019 comedy film Big Three Dragons. In December 2019, Tseng announced that she would no longer appear in sitcoms for health reasons.

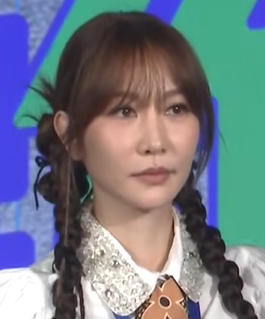
Tseng at a press conference for Stars,Take Action! in January 2026

Tseng secured another main role as Miranda, a discipline teacher, in the coming-of-age drama series Youngsters On Fire from 2021 to 2022, appearing in all three seasons. She and the other teacher cast members departed in the spin-off fourth season, which focused on the adult lives of the student cast. Tseng also starred in the 2021 gangster film Gatao: The Last Stray as a corrupt councilwoman. During the COVID-19 pandemic, most productions in Taiwan were suspended, and Tseng applied to pursue a master's degree in 2021. She deferred her studies for a year in 2022 and returned to fulfill her contracted film roles as productions began to resume. She also announced her transition from television to web series in the same year, starting her new career path with leading roles in the web miniseries Lang, Always by Your Sideand the Netflix drama series Mom, Don't Do That!. In 2023, she then had a supporting role in first TVBS original series Lovely Villain. That same year, she took on a leading role as a possessed woman in the horror film Antikalpa, and played a mistress in the horror film The Rope Curse 3. In 2024, Tseng was cast in main roles in the comedy series The Thrifty Family, and as Yin-yin, a well-known diva, in the Netflix drama series Born for the Spotlight.

== Business career ==
In October 2017, Tseng announced the launch of her cosmetics brand Chwanme, headquartered in Taichung. The same year, she and her mother established food manufacturer AwesomeFood Zhen. In November 2018, she launched another clothing brand I.Real. In October 2019, Tseng published her autobiography I.REAL Vicky Tseng. The book sold over 10,000 copies within the first month of its release.

== Filmography ==
=== Film ===
Year	Title	Role	Notes/Ref.
2016	The Big Power	38 Mei's younger sister	
2017	The Perfect Girl	Yeh Hsin's personality	Cameo
2019	Big Three Dragons	Bra Sister (普拉嘉)	
2021	Gatao: The Last Stray	Shi Pei-yu (石珮瑜)	
2023	Antikalpa	Auntie Yu-fan (羽凡姑姑)	
2023	The Rope Curse 3	Rose (玫瑰)	

=== Television ===
Year	Title	Role	Notes/Ref.
1998	The Legends of Tudigong	Maid	Cast extra
2001	Taiwan Horror Stories	—N/a	Cast extra
2001	Strokes of Life	Fen Fang (芬芳)	Guest role
2001	Farbidden Love	Chen Pei-yung (陳佩蓉)	Guest role
2002	Spicy Teacher	Tseng Yuan-hua (曾婉華)	Guest role
2002	In Love	Song Chien-chien (宋芊芊)	Guest role
2003	The Pink Godfather	Feng Kai-li (馮凱莉)	Recurring role
2004	40 Carats	Hu Mei-mei (胡美美)	Guest role
2004	The Unforgettable Memory	Hsin Hsin (欣欣)	Guest role
2006	The Amazing Strategist Liu Bo Wen	Lan Hsiao-die (藍小蝶)	Guest role
2009	Lai Buyi the Steward	Liu Fei-yen (柳飛燕)	Guest role
2010	The Wife Wars	Tsin Mei-hsuan (秦美璇)	Recurring role
2010	Lee's Family Reunion	Lin Ai-ting (林艾婷)	Recurring role
2011	Wives	Chen Yu-siu (陳育秀)	Main role
2012	Peak Times	Tseng Yu-ting (曾玉婷)	Main role
2012	Father's Wish	Tsai Jia-min (蔡佳敏)	Main role
2012	The Heart of Woman	Chao Yu-wei (趙郁惠)	Recurring role
2013	Ordinary Love	Kuo Jia-jia (郭佳佳)	Main role
2015	Taste of Life	Zhou Xiao-jing (周曉菁)	Main role
2016	Stand By Me	Chiang Yu-wei (江雨薇)	Recurring role
2018	100%Wife	Jin Chien-chien(金倩倩)	Main role
2018	The Sound of Happiness	He Xin-di (何辛蒂)	Cameo
2019	The Devil Punisher	Li Shu-hui (李淑惠)	Cameo
2021–2022	Youngsters On Fire	Miranda (米蘭達)	Main role (season 1–3)
2022	Lang, Always by Your Side	Ursula (烏蘇拉)	Main role
2022	Mom, Don't Do That!	Ceng Kai-te (曾凱特)	Main role
2023	Lovely Villain	Wang Pei-tsi (王沛芝)	Recurring role
2024	The Thrifty Family	Lin Hsuan-shui (林尚水)	Main role
2024	Urban Horror	Soybean (豆花)	Main role
2024	Born for the Spotlight	Yin-yin (潘茵茵)	Main role

== Awards and nominations ==
Year	Award	Category	Nominated Work	Result	Ref.
2025	60th Golden Bell Awards	Best Supporting Actress in a Television Series	Born for the Spotlight	Won	
