= On Our Way =

On Our Way may refer to:

- On Our Way (film), a 2021 film
- On Our Way, a 2023 television series starring Vicky Chen and Hsing Hui
- "On Our Way", a 2006 song by Christina Aguilera from Back to Basics
- "On Our Way", a 2013 song by The Royal Concept from Goldrushed
