= My Family My Love =

- Chinese: 天下父母心
- Hokkien POJ: Thian-hā Hū-bió-sim
- Genre: Family; Romance
- Directed by: Feng Kai; Wu Meng-en; Liu Jian-lu; Lin Ying; Long Zhen; Yu Wei-de
- Country of origin: Taiwan
- Original language: Hokkien
- No. of episodes: 350

Production
- Running time: 120-150 minutes

Original release
- Network: SET Taiwan
- Release: September 2, 2009 – November 10, 2010

My Family My Love (Chinese: 天下父母心; Pe̍h-ōe-jī: Thian-hā Hū-bió-sim) is a Taiwanese Hokkien television series that airs on SET Taiwan in Taiwan.

== Summary ==
Mao Song is an honourable and law - abiding country governor. In order to cover up his past extramarital affair, he is forced to sign an official document which goes against his conscience and sacrifices the rights of his people.

== History ==
The television series' principal screenwriter is Lin Lingling (Chinese: 林齡齡). The series filmed a scene at Dahu Park, where actress Athena Lee Yen, who had to go into the water 10 times for a scene, injured her knee while returning to shore.

The cast members Chen Guan Lin and Athena Lee Yen received criticism for plagiarism of the Korean drama My Lovely Sam Soon in the My Family My Love theme song Long Huilian (Chinese: 龍慧戀).

== Reception ==
World Journal reported that netizens disparaged the television series for having "repeated dialogues in the drama as if they were beating a wall".

== Taiwan broadcast ==
As of June 2011, the show airs in Taiwan, country of origin of the drama every weeknight at prime time (20:00) with episodes which have ranged in length from 135 to 150 minutes including commercial advertisements. The producers received funding from the Government Information Office to produce the series in high definition.

The television series received an audience viewership rating of 4.86 on 3 November 2009, making it the most viewed drama in Taiwan. Its ratings that day were higher than the highly rated series Mom's House.

== International broadcast ==
=== Vietnam ===
The Vietnamese dub "Tấm Lòng Cha Mẹ" was broadcast on Vietnam Television for Southern area (VTV9), Voice of Vietnam Television (VOV TV), Saigon Tourist Cable Television (SCTV), Vinh Long Television Station Channel (THVL) (Vietnamese: Truyền Hình Vĩnh Long), etc. and is streamable on YouTube.

=== Malaysia ===
The drama is broadcasting now in 8TV in original Hokkien language under the English title My Family My Love for two episodes with one hour each from Monday to Friday, at 11:30 MST and 13:00 MST with a 30 minutes break of its Midday Mandarin News at 12:30 MST.

=== Singapore ===
Due to local broadcast laws prohibiting radio or television broadcasts in Chinese dialects, the show was dubbed into Mandarin when it aired on Singapore's MediaCorp Channel 8, thus making it the first channel to broadcast the show in Mandarin. The drama was repeated on Monday to Thursday at 10.30am to 12.30pm on Mediacorp Channel 8 succeeding Unique Flavour. It was the fourth Taiwan drama to broadcast the show in Singapore.

== Music ==
片頭曲

1. 回家門 (2009年9月2日－2009年10月2日)
  詞曲：郭之儀，主唱：王建傑、甲子慧
2. 愛情像被單 (2009年10月5日－2009年10月30日)
  詞曲：傑米，主唱：方瑞娥
3. 愛阮愛一半 (2009年11月2日－2009年11月26日)
  詞曲：王宗凱，主唱：詹曼鈴
4. 惜福 (2009年11月27日－2009年12月31日)
  作詞：傑米，作曲：傑米、張振傑，主唱：蔡秋鳳
5. 勇敢的愛 (2010年1月1日－2010年2月2日)
  詞曲：彭立，主唱：彭立
6. 名份 (2010年2月3日－2010年3月23日)
  詞曲：林東松，主唱：甲子慧
7. 鴛鴦 (2010年3月24日－2010年4月20日)
  詞曲：林東松，主唱：陳茂豐、甲子慧
8. 癡情歌 (2010年4月21日－2010年6月30日)
  作詞：謝金燕，作曲：張勇強，主唱：孫淑媚
9. 用心 (2010年7月1日－2010年7月30日)
  詞曲：江志豐，主唱：龍千玉
10. 感情坎坷路 (2010年8月2日－2010年8月31日)
  詞曲：陳偉強，主唱：王中平、甲子慧
11. 憨人 (2010年9月1日－2010年9月30日)
  作詞：謝金燕，作曲：林從胤，主唱：謝金燕
12. 選擇你 (2010年10月1日－10月31日)
  詞曲：江志豐，主唱：張秀卿、江志豐
13. 憨人 (2010年11月1日－2010年11月10日)
  作詞：謝金燕，作曲：林從胤，主唱：謝金燕

插曲

1. 心肝寶貝
  「招弟、蕾蕾主題曲」
  作詞：李坤城、羅大佑，作曲：羅大佑，主唱：鳳飛飛
2. 難忘的鳳凰橋
  「茂松、招弟主題曲」(第1集)
  作詞：葉俊麟，作曲：葉俊麟，主唱：方瑞娥
3. 牽阮的手
  「朝全、招弟戀曲」(第206集)
  詞曲：徐錦凱，主唱：蔡幸娟
4. 家後
  「松珠夫婦戀曲」
  詞曲：Chris Hung、葉勝欽、柯英高，主唱：廖峻(茂松)，原唱：Chris Hung
5. 如果沒有你
  「文龍、有慧戀曲」
  作詞：李焯雄、左安安，作曲：左安安，主唱：陳以岫，原唱：莫文蔚
6. 溫暖的雙手
  「民中臨別曲」(第153集)、「麗君臨別曲」(第247集) 」
  作詞：黃思婷，作曲：黃明洲，主唱：黃思婷
7. 天地
  「大同臨別曲」（第247集）
  作詞：巴布，作曲：蕭蔓萱，主唱：黃文星
8. 愛是一種負擔
  「有美、國慶失戀曲」(第191集)
  詞曲：王尚宏，主唱：孫淑媚
9. 月光
  「如玉臨別曲」(第216集)、「英傑、天憶失戀曲」(第232集)
  詞曲：陳偉強，主唱：孫淑媚
10. 不曾說愛你
  「 建文 志玲 麗美戀曲」（第272，278集、第300集）
  詞曲：江志豐，主唱：孫協志 方寶珍(建文 素美)，原唱：羅時豐
11. 父母的心聲
  「有美結婚曲」（第281集）
  詞曲：郭之儀，主唱：孫淑媚
12. 癡情歌
  「有美戀曲」(第185集)、「正弘、蕾蕾戀曲」(第187集)、「蔡有美過世」(第303集)
  作詞：謝金燕，作曲：張勇強，主唱：孫淑媚
13. 上愛的人
  「正弘、蕾蕾失戀曲」(第198集)
  詞曲：Chris Hung、葉勝欽、柯英高，主唱：Chris Hung
14. 台北上午零時
  「茂松淋雨曲」(第308集)
  詞曲：洪一峰，主唱：洪一峰

片尾曲

1. 愛情像被單 (2009年9月2日－2009年9月30日)
  詞曲：傑米，主唱：方瑞娥
2. 無情鴛鴦夢 (2009年10月1日－2009年10月1日)
  詞曲：葉勝欽，主唱：孫淑媚、Wang Shih-hsien
3. 傷心傷一半 (2009年10月2日－2009年11月3日)
  詞曲：葉勝欽，主唱：孫淑媚
4. 前世緣 (2009年11月4日－2009年11月30日)
  詞曲：林久登、楚陽，主唱：秀蘭瑪雅、陳冠霖
5. 無情雨 (2009年12月1日－2009年12月31日)
  詞曲：陳偉強，主唱：王中平
6. 惜福 (2010年1月1日－2010年1月15日)
  詞曲：傑米，主唱：蔡秋鳳
7. 秋風落葉 (2010年1月18日－2010年2月12日)
  作詞：沈建福，作曲：南雅人，主唱：林姍
8. 不能講的秘密 (2010年2月15日－2010年3月31日)
  詞曲：江志豐，主唱：Weng Li-you
9. 原諒我 (2010年4月1日－2010年5月14日)
  作詞：高以德，作曲：黃明洲、吳舜華，主唱：Chris Hung
10. 上愛的人 (2010年5月17日－2010年5月31日)
  詞曲：Chris Hung、葉勝欽、柯英高，主唱：Chris Hung
11. 落花淚 (2010年6月1日－2010年6月1日)
  詞曲：張燕清，主唱：龍千玉、Tsai Hsiao-hu
12. 用心 (2010年6月2日－2010年6月30日)
  詞曲：江志豐，主唱：龍千玉
13. 上愛的人 (2010年7月1日－2010年7月30日)
  詞曲：Chris Hung、葉勝欽、柯英高，主唱：Chris Hung
14. 傷心手指 (2010年8月2日－2010年8月31日)
  詞曲：蕭茂成，主唱：Wang Shih-hsien, 孫淑媚
15. 不曾說愛妳 (2010年9月1日－2010年9月15日)
  詞曲：江志豐，主唱：羅時豐
16. 選擇你 (2010年9月16日－2010年9月30日)
  詞曲：江志豐，主唱：張秀卿、江志豐
17. 石敢當 (2010年10月1日－2010年11月10日)
  作詞：高以德，作曲：吳舜華、黃明洲，主唱：揚哲

金曲

1. 用真心愛一個人 (2009年9月2日－2009年9月11日)
  作詞：張文夫，作曲：螞蟻，主唱：Tsai Hsiao-hu
2. 重感情 (2009年9月14日－2009年9月25日)
  作詞：Tsai Hsiao-hu，作曲：江志豐，主唱：Tsai Hsiao-hu
3. 愛情像被單 (2009年9月28日－2009年10月9日)
  詞曲：傑米，主唱：方瑞娥
4. 吃緊弄破碗 (2009年10月12日－2009年10月23日)
  詞曲：傑米，主唱：張政雄、薛珮潔
5. 雞公弄雞母 (2009年10月26日－2009年11月6日)
  作詞：巴布，作曲：蕭蔓萱，主唱：張政雄、薛珮潔
6. 路邊攤 (2009年11月9日－2009年11月13日)
  作詞：巴布，作曲：蕭蔓萱，主唱：張政雄、薛珮潔
7. 明天 (2009年11月16日－2009年11月27日)
  詞曲：江志豐，主唱：江志豐
8. 香水 (2009年11月30日－2009年12月18日)
  詞曲：江志豐，主唱：江志豐、張秀卿
9. 一切攏是空 (2009年12月21日－2010年2月5日)
  作詞：巴布，作曲：蕭蔓萱，主唱，蔡秋鳳
10. 不能講的秘密 (2010年2月8日－2010年3月5日)
  詞曲：江志豐，主唱：Weng Li-you
11. 夜市人生 (2010年3月8日－2010年3月19日)
  詞曲：江志豐，主唱：Weng Li-you
12. 尚水的伴 (2010年3月22日－2010年3月31日)
  作詞：許文祺，作曲：許明傑，主唱，Weng Li-you
13. 紙糊的心 (2010年4月1日－2010年4月30日)
  作詞：邱宏瀛，作曲：黃明洲、吳舜華，主唱：朱海君
14. 異鄉的城市 (2010年5月3日－2010年5月21日)
  詞曲：傑米，主唱：李明洋、龍千玉
15. 無緣的情人 (2010年5月24日－2010年5月31日)
  詞曲：李其昇，主唱：李明洋
16. 用心 (2010年6月1日－2010年6月18日)
  詞曲：江志豐，主唱：龍千玉
17. 落花淚 (2010年6月21日－2010年6月30日)
  詞曲：張燕清，主唱：龍千玉、Tsai Hsiao-hu
18. 不曾說愛妳 (2010年7月1日－2010年8月31日)
  詞曲：江志豐，主唱：羅時豐
19. 三口組 (2010年9月1日－2010年10月6日)
  作詞：巴布，作曲：蕭蔓萱，主唱：張政雄、薛珮潔、Weng Li-you
20. 選擇你 (2010年10月7日－2010年10月31日)
  詞曲：江志豐，主唱：張秀卿、江志豐
21. 疼惜 (2010年11月1日－2010年11月10日)
  詞曲：游元祿，主唱：Tsai Hsiao-hu、龍千玉
