= Jia He Wan Shi Xing =

家和万事兴 or 家和萬事興 is a Chinese character for an idiom that means harmony in the family leads to prosperity in all undertakings.

It may refer to:

- Happy Home, All is well, 1986 Taiwanese television series starring Angela Pan
- Lee's Family Reunion, 2010 Taiwanese Hokkien television series
- Nursing Our Love, 2015 Chinese television series starring Madina Memet
