= Jinzhi Yuye =

金枝玉葉 or 金枝玉叶, literally 'golden branch jade leaf', may refer to:

- Golden Branches and Jade Leaves, 2010 Chinese television series starring Alina Zhang and Michael Miu
- Strokes of Life, 2001 Taiwanese costume Hokkien drama
- Yanxi Palace: Princess Adventures, 2019 Chinese web series starring Wu Jinyan and Nie Yuan
