= I Shall Succeed =

- Poster
- Chinese: 我一定要成功
- Hokkien POJ: Góa-it‑tēng-iau-sêng‑kong
- Created by: Lin Chih-hsiang; Huang Qin Lan; Lvwan Jun; Chu; Sunkun Lin; Wen-Chieh Tsai; Liu Xiaojing; Liu Xiaolan
- Developed by: SET TV
- Directed by: Gongmei Fu; He Dongxing; Shen Yee
- Country of origin: Taiwan
- Original language: Taiwanese
- No. of episodes: 201

Production
- Executive producer: Hao Xiaozu
- Production location: Taiwan
- Camera setup: Multi-camera
- Running time: 120 minutes (with ads); 90 minutes (1 ep.); 105 minutes (first 2-28 ep); 135 minutes (176 ep); 50 minutes (201 ep)

Original release
- Network: SET TV

Related
- Unique Flavor; Love Above All

I Shall Succeed (Chinese: 我一定要成功; pinyin: Wǒ Yīdìng Yào Chénggōng; Pe̍h-ōe-jī: Góa-it‑tēng-iau-sêng‑kong) is a Taiwanese Hokkien television drama that began airing on SET Taiwan in Taiwan on 19 September 2007, from Mondays to Fridays at 8 pm, and ends on 25 June 2008, with a total of 201 episodes.

It stars Chien Pei En, Ya Chian Zhen, Lee Lee-zen and Huo Zhengqi, and deals with make-up industry.

== Broadcast ==
The series was broadcast on SET Taiwan in Taiwan on 19 September 2007 to 20 November 2008.

== Cast ==
Played by	Character	Description	Debut (episodes)
Chien Pei En	Teo Mei Qin	Tay Wen De's wife, Main Character	1–201
Lee Lee-zen	Liao Shih-hsiung / Cheng Wen-te	Teo Mei Qin's husband, Main Character	1–160
Ya Chian Zhen	Xia Shao Fen	Qian Leong's love interest, Lead Actress	1–201
Huo Zhengqi	Ang Qian Liong	Shao Fen's love interest, Lead Actor	1–180, 200–201
Jiang Guobin	Tay Ying Sheng	Shao Fen's biological father, Main Antagonist → Main Protagonist	14–201
Yi Zhen	Liao Shi Hua	in love with Shao Fen, Ya Ting and Wen De's elder brother	1–180, 200–201
Michael Huang	Chen Kun-shan		
