= The Heart of Woman =

- Chinese: 天下女人心
- Hokkien POJ: Thian-hā Lú-jîn-sim
- Genre: Drama
- Written by: Lin Jiuyu (林久愉)
- Directed by: Lui Jian-Li (劉建律); Chen Jun-Ren (陳俊任); Qiao Ru Bin (鄥汝彬)
- Starring: Norman Chen; Pally Wu; Huang Yu Rong; Joanne Lien; Eric Huang; Jean Kao; Li Yi; Angel Han; Carolyn Chen
- Country of origin: Taiwan
- Original language: Taiwanese Hokkien
- No. of episodes: 798

Production
- Executive producer: Yu Weizhong (俞惟中)
- Producers: Xiang Dechun (項德純); Zhang Ruofan (張若凡); Chen Zhicheng (陳志成); Wu Shengwen (吳聖文); Zhang Zhunqun (張志群); Lin Shuxian (林姝嫻); Lin Yating (林雅婷); Chen Ziying (陳紫瀅); Guo Huanxuan (郭歡萱)
- Running time: 150 minutes (with commercial breaks)
- Production company: Shenghua Entertainment Communication Co. Ltd.

Original release
- Network: SET Taiwan
- Release: 4 April 2010 – 2 January 2014

The Heart of Woman (Chinese: 天下女人心; Pe̍h-ōe-jī: Thian-hā Lú-jîn-sim), also known as Women, is a Taiwanese Hokkien television series that began airing on SET Taiwan in Taiwan on 21 November 2012, from Mondays to Fridays, and ends on 21 November 2013, lasting one year with a total of 262 episodes.

== Cast ==
The cast are listed according to the families they belong to in the drama.

=== 1st Generation cast ===
Main cast

- Norman Chen as Chen Yingqi/Xu Shaoqiang
- Pally Chien as Li Tianxin/Zhang Ting Ting
- Huang Yu Rong as Li Weiming
- Joanne Lien as Liu Shi Mei
- Eric Huang as Anthony Yang Le Duo
- Jean Kao as Sun Bao Er/Chen Xiao Xiao

Chens

- Shi Feng as Chen Chang Hui
- Chen Shufang as Chen Lin Yue
- Vins Wang Yi-Cheng as Chen Haowen
- Doris Kuang as Yang Qiumei
- Jessie Chang as Chen Haoping
- Hsing Hui as Chen Xiao Xiao

Yans

- Franco Chiang as Yan Guo Feng
- Chen Liangzhe as Wang Qitai
- Vicky Tseng as Zhao Yuhui
- Qiu Chen-en as Yan Zhi-long

Wangs

- Lin Xiuling as Wang Jinfeng

Suns

- Henry Yang as Sun Zhengdong
- He Yi Pei as Sun Xue Er

Lees

- Josh Huo as Li Minglong
- Chen Yi as Lisa Xie Liling

Lius

- Joseph Hsia as Liu De Hua
- Lü Hsueh-feng as Lu Yulian/Li Ruifang
- Lin Youxing as Liu Junjie

Liaos

- Cheng Chih-Wei as Liao Jianghu
- Joyce Cai as Liao Yao Mei

Xus

- Lung Shao-hua as Xu Yongye
- Charry Lin as Zhang Wenjuan

=== 2nd Generation Cast ===
Main Cast

- Eric Huang as Lin Jia Hao
- Pally Chien as Jiang Yu Hua
- Li Yi as Huang Yi Cheng/Jiang Yuanqi
- Penny Lin as Gao Nian Ci
- Joyce Yu as Xiao Zhen/Guo Yizhen/Hong Yi Zhen

Jiangs

- Yang Lie as Jiang Da Hai/Jiang Tianshen
- Ting Chen as Jiang Qianghua
- Wang Qi as Young Jiang Qianghua
- Lan Jing Heng as Jiang Yuan Long

Lins

- On Xuebin as Lin Zhong Xing
- Su Yi Jing as He Shumin/Mu Dan
- Lian Yu Ting as Lin Guangyi
- Liu Xiaoyi as Wang Feng Jiao

Fangs

- Kelly Ko as Luo Yue Li
- Debby Yang as Cai Chunjiao
- Eric Ma as Fang Qingchang
- Angel Huang as Man Na
- Xiao Jinghong as Fang Li Xiang

Gaos

- Wang Hao as Gao Shou

Dings

- Leo Ting as Ding Yao Wu

Hongs

- Li Luo as Hong Jian Hui
- Ting Kuo-Lin as Peng Ai Fei

Guos

- Yue Hung as Guo Yan Hong
- Pan Yian as Guo You Da

Qius

- Lin An Di as Tuo La Ku
- Lin Yu-Zi as Huang Li Li
- Wang Yuefeng as Xiao Shuai
- Livia Lin as Xiao Shan
- Wang Zhengxun as Xiao Zhi

Zhaos

- Sean Su as Zhao Meng
- Viola Fang as Xiao Yun

Wang Lai Fa's Family

- Zhang Youming as Wang Lai Fa
- Elissa Jing as Wang Xuan Xuan

Ye's

- Xu Zi Ting as Melody Ye Hui Zhen
- Eason Zhao as Winnie
- Nie Bingxian as Xie Zhengtang

=== Other casts ===
- Dong Shunhao as Mark
- Lin Yu-Shun as Ma Sha
- Xu Zi Zhan as Ah Chun
- Ceng Yi Qing as Fanny
- Stacy Chou as Gao Ai Lun
- Chen Jianlong as Liu Yubin
- Kao Ming-Wei as Goh Lu Qi
- Shen Hong as Xiao Ling Ling
- Lan Wei Hua as Zhang Jianliang
- Su Lixuan as Andy
- Miao Zhen as Betty
- He Guanying as Tie Xiong
- Lu Biao as Tian Fu
- Liao Jin De as Inspector Xiao
- Zhu Yongde as Si-xian
- Guo Yunze as Ah Hao
- NoVa Yeh as Arnold
- Lin Xiaolou as Amy Chen

=== Guest cast ===
- Calvin Lee as George
- You Long Shu as Zheng Hong Gui
- Emerson Tsai as A-chang
- Tang Zhen as Tang Xiaohui
- Wen Ke Xian as Cai Xiao Min
- Han Yuen as Tiona
- Angela Ye Hua as Zhao Yanjun
- Qi Shang-yuan as Yan Jun
- Mark Dai as Qiu Xianyou
- Hong Ruixia as Hong Hua
- Zheng Yingxiong as Zheng Hei Gui
- Wan Hong Gui as Wu Zengzan
- Zhao Shun as Gu Xiao Zhou
- Lin Yingcheng as Gu Yaxing
- Amanda Fan as Gu Yaping
- Hsiao Hou Tao as Lin Wanfu
- Abel An as Paul
- Lan Yi Ping as Lin Wang Yao
- He Man Ning as Yang Guizhi
- Lin Zhiwei as Lin Chun Tao
- Cai Shengwei as Chen Fu Gui

== International broadcast ==
=== Malaysia broadcast ===
The drama was broadcast on 8TV in original Hokkien language under the English title The Heart of Woman from Monday to Friday, at 18:00 MST starting 18 February 2014.
