= Lee Lee-zen =

Taiwanese actor, television host and singer

- 李李仁
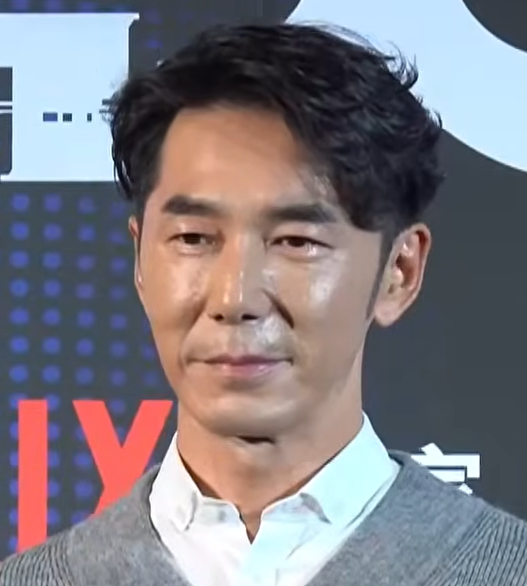
- Lee in February 2026
- Born: 6 January 1974 (age 52); Taipei, Taiwan
- Other names: Li Li-jen; Li Liren
- Occupations: Actor, television host, singer
- Years active: 1996—present
- Spouse: Matilda Tao (m. 2005)
- Children: 2

Chinese name
- Chinese: 李李仁
Transcriptions
Standard Mandarin
- Hanyu Pinyin: Lǐ Lǐrén
Southern Min
- Hokkien POJ: Lí Lí-jîn

Lee Lee-zen (Chinese: 李李仁; Pe̍h-ōe-jī: Lí Lí-jîn, born 6 January 1974) is a Taiwanese actor, television host and singer. He began his career in 1996 as a singer, and went on to make his acting debut in the television series Chrysalis (1999). Since then, he has starred in television series such as The Unforgettable Memory, I Shall Succeed, Hero Daddy and Once Upon a Time in Beitou. Lee is also noted for his role in the period drama series Home, for which he won a Golden Bell Award in 2013.

== Personal life ==
Lee's wife is television host and singer Matilda Tao. They married in 2005 and have two children together.

== Filmography ==
=== Film ===
Year	English title	Original title	Role	Notes
2010	I Love You So Much	我這樣愛你		
2011	Night Market Hero	雞排英雄	Yi-nan's father	Cameo
2012	Din Tao: Leader of the Parade	陣頭	Ah Gui	
2014	Twa-Tiu-Tiann	大稻埕	Chiang Wei-shui	
2015	The Mad King of Taipei	西城童話	Ximen King	
2016	The Good Dinosaur	—N/a	Poppa Henry	Taiwanese release, voice
2016	The Big Power	大顯神威	Lung Tung	
2016	Packages from Daddy	心靈時鐘	Dad (Yeh Wen-li)	
2016	Sisterhood	骨妹	Chen Chung	
2019	Nina Wu	灼人秘密	Mark	
2019	Hello Tapir	嗨！神獸		
2019	One Headlight	絕世情歌		
2020	Miss Andy	迷失安狄		
2021	The Falls	瀑布	Wang Qi-wen	
2023	The Pig, The Snake and The Pigeon	周處除三害	Chen Hui	
2025	96 Minutes	96分鐘	Lee Chieh	

=== Television ===
Year	English title	Original title	Role	Notes/Ref.
1999	Chrysalis	蛹		
2000	Women Walk	女生向前走	Hung Shui-yang	
2000	Big Foot	大腳阿嬤	Yao Tsung	
2000	OK Shao Nian Dang	OK少年檔		
2000	Shall We Marry?	女人劇場-我們結婚好嗎?		
2000	Idol and Romance	偶像劇場之網路美女		
2000	TVBS Music Love Story	TVBS音樂愛情故事		
2001	Yong-Zhen Qing Hui Wei	詠-真情回味	Lin Pen-tung	
2001	Christmas in Cijin	旗津的聖誕節		
2001	Misty Rain in Jiangnan	煙雨江南	Chien Tang-chiang	
2002	Angel Boy	天使少年		
2002	Fall in Love with the Manager	愛上總經理	Chao Ta-tung	
2002	Love Goal	愛上痞子男	Fang Yi-lun	
2002	City Hero	城市造英雄	Yao Kan-shu	
2003	Diary of Sex and the City	熟女欲望日記	Wei-che	
2003	The Pawnshop No. 8	第八號當舖	Yang Wen-han	
2003	A Sa Bu Lu 1 Hao	阿薩布路1號	Teng Pi-sheng	
2003	Love Train-Yokohama's Love	心動列車-廣島之戀	Mike	
2003	Ai Huang Yan Pei Ou Lan	愛‧謊言‧配偶欄-謊言	Joe	
2004	Desire for Life	慾望人生	Yang Yao-tsung	
2004	The Unforgettable Memory	意難忘	Wang Sheng-chih	
2004	Mars	戰神	Chen Chung-chih (youth)	
2007	Mask	面具	Li Wu-tung	
2007	Summer x Summer	熱情仲夏	Kuei Lung-shih	
2007	Wonderful Coffee	兩個門牌一個家	Li Ta-peng	
2007	I Shall Succeed	我一定要成功	Liao Shih-hsiung / Cheng Wen-te	
2010	Hero Daddy	帶子英雄	Wang Ching-yun	
2012	Sweet Sweet Bodyguard	剩女保鏢	Alan Cheng	
2012	Home	回家 / 彼岸1945	Su Tai-chang	
2014	Once Upon a Time in Beitou	熱海戀歌	Lo Ying-hsiung	
2014	The Empress of China	武媚娘傳奇	Li Chengqian	
2016	High 5 Basketball	High 5 制霸青春	Chang Pai-sheng	
2017	Reading Taiwan Literature II	閱讀時光2-先生媽	Chien Hsin-fa	
2017	The Teenage Psychic	通靈少女	Yun-le's father	
2017	My Dear Boy	我的男孩	Lai Chien-kuo	
2018	Youth	以你為名的青春	Du's father	Webseries
2019	The Kidnappers	失控	Lin Xiaofeng	Webseries
2019	Déjà vu	如果愛，重來	Tchaikov / Ho Lan-cheng	
2023	Million-follower Detective	百萬人推理	TBA	
2025	Marching Boys	進行曲	Chiang Hao’s father	

=== Variety show ===
English title	Original title	Notes
Fun Science	科學萬萬歲	Host
Taiwan Billboard	台灣風雲榜	Host
3 Kingdoms	綜藝三國智	Host
TV Iron Man	電視鐵人	Host
Taipei Walker	Taipei Walker新鮮活	Host
Shi Quan Shi Mei Chu Fang Hao Man	食全食美 廚房好Man	Host
Honey! Go!	真愛在囧途	Cast member

=== Music video appearances ===
Year	Artist	Song title
2005	Matilda Tao	"Women's Secret"
2007	Jody Chiang	"Wishes"
2007	Jody Chiang	"Grandpa's Bed"
2014	Matilda Tao	"Rang Ai Qing Wei Chi Xin Tiao"

== Discography ==
=== Studio albums ===
Title	Album details	Track listing
Bu Ai De Bu Shi Wo 不愛的不是我	Released: December 1, 1996; Label: Friendly Dog Entertainment; Formats: CD	Track listing: 1. 夢裡沒有你; 2. 不愛的不是我; 3. 傻笑; 4. 世界那麼大; 5. 愛了再說; 6. 不小心; 7. 用感覺生活; 8. 痊癒; 9. 佔據; 10. 飛行東京

=== Singles ===
Year	Title	Notes
2014	"My Dear Honey 心愛的Honey"	Lee Chien-na feat. Lee Lee-zen

== Awards and nominations ==
Year	Award	Category	Nominated work	Result
2001	36th Golden Bell Awards	Best Host in a Children Program	Fun Science	Nominated
2005	40th Golden Bell Awards	Best Leading Actor in a Television Series	The Unforgettable Memory	Nominated
2012	47th Sanlih Drama Awards	Best Tears Award	Sweet Sweet Bodyguard	Won
2013	48th Golden Bell Awards	Best Supporting Actor in a Television Series	Home	Won
2024	26th Taipei Film Awards	Best Supporting Actor	The Pig, the Snake and the Pigeon	Won
