= Mom, Don't Do That! =

Taiwanese television series

Chinese name
- Traditional Chinese: 媽，別鬧了！
- Simplified Chinese: 妈，别闹了！
Transcriptions
Standard Mandarin
- Hanyu Pinyin: Mā, Bié Nàole！
- Genre: Comedy drama Suspense; Thriller
- Written by: Matthew Yen; Yanping Xu
- Directed by: Chen Wei-ling; Lee Chun Hong
- Presented by: Xie Guohao; Zheng Xingxun (CJ ENM Entertainment Division); Luo Weijun; Lin Tiangui
- Starring: Alyssa Chia; Ko Chia-yen; Wu Kang-ren; Austin Lin; Billie Wang
- Country of origin: Taiwan
- Original language: Mandarin
- No. of seasons: 1
- No. of episodes: 11

Production
- Executive producer: Alyssa Chia
- Producers: Zhou Quan; Zheng Xingxun; Chen Wei-ling
- Running time: 43-67 minutes
- Budget: NT$100,000,000

Original release
- Network: Netflix
- Release: 15 July 2022

Mom, Don't Do That! (traditional Chinese: 媽，別鬧了！; simplified Chinese: 妈，别闹了！) is a 2022 Taiwanese Netflix original series written by Matthew Yen and directed by Chen Wei-ling. The series stars Alyssa Chia, Ko Chia-yen, Wu Kang-ren, Austin Lin and Billie Wang.

== Synopsis ==
After her husband's death, a 60-year-old mom decides to find love again — to the joy and annoyance of her two daughters. Based on a true story.

== Cast ==
=== Main starring ===
- Billie Wang as Wang Mei-mei
- Alyssa Chia as Chen Ru-rong
- Ko Chia-yen as Chen Ruo-min, Chen Ru-rong's younger sister
- Wu Kang-ren as Luo Xiang Yu / Xu Jia Hao, Chen Ru-rong's university senior
- Austin Lin as Cha, Chen Ruo-min's boyfriend
- Vicky Tseng as Ceng Kai Te, Chen Ru-rong's colleague
- Kou Hsi Shun as Chen Guang Hui, Chen Ru-rong's father

=== Support roles ===
- Lung Shao Hua as A Yong
- Hans Chung as Jia Guo Hui, Ceng Kai Te's fiancé
- Chloe Xiang as Da Shi Yao Ji / Sun Xin Xin
- Shen Hai Rong as Jin Xiang Yu, Wang Mei-mei's classmate
- Wasir Chou as Lu Yi
- Fu Lei as Di Ren Hou
- Ting Chiang as Mr. Xu
- Harry Chang as Jin Bao Bei, Jin Xiang Yu's son
- Yeh Chuan Chen as Ye Fu Mei, Cha's mother
- Huang Bo Feng (Real estate agent)
- Adam Lin as P.E. teacher

=== Guest roles ===
- Cherry Hsieh as Xia Mi (Ep. 1)
- Hsin Shao as Shao Xiao Dong (Ep. 2)
- Joseph Hsia as Wu Kang Kai (Ep. 2)
- Kan Kan as Chang Xiang Yi (Ep. 2)
- Chung Hsin-ling (Ep. 2)
- Lu Yi Long as A Long (Ep. 2)
- Peace Yang as Actress (Ep. 2)
- Duan Chun-hao as Di Ren Hou's son (Ep. 2–3)
- Jiang Hong En as Huang Fei Long (Ep. 4, 10)
- Yang Li Yin as Teacher Yang (Ep. 4)
- Chao Yi Lan as Handsome man (Ep. 8)
- Bryan Chang as Zhang Fu Hai (Ep. 11)
- Jian Man Shu as Lin Yu Jing (Ep. 11)
- Stephanie Chang as Huang Yi Xin (Ep. 11)
