= Chungyu University of Film and Arts =

University in Xinyi, Keelung, Taiwan

- 崇右影藝科技大學
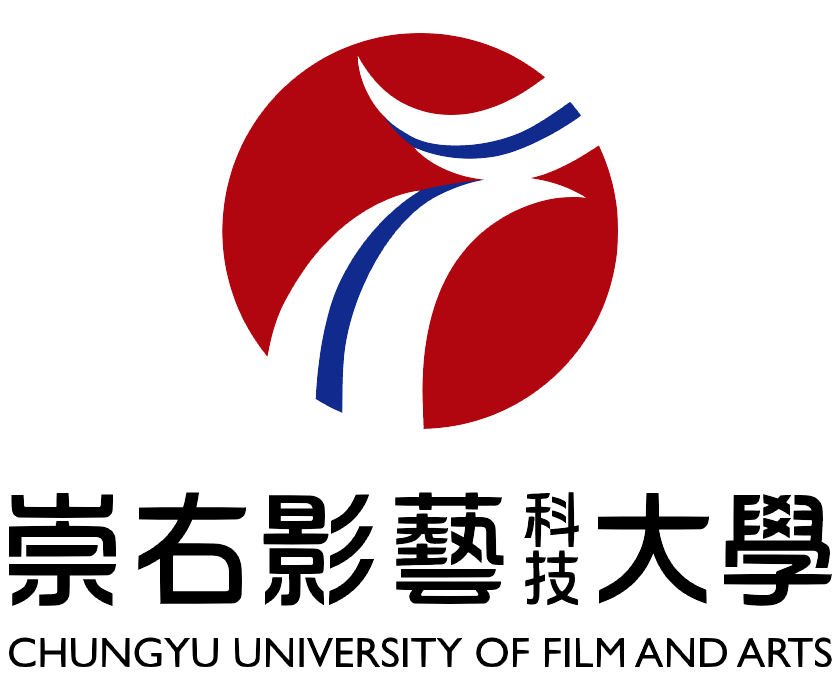
- Type: Private
- Established: 1967 (as Chungyu Junior College of Business Administration); 1 August 2003 (as Chungyu Institute of Technology); 1 August 2017 (as Chungyu University of Film and Arts)
- Location: Xinyi, Keelung, Taiwan; 25°07′55.5″N 121°45′15.4″E
- Website: Official website (in Chinese)

Chungyu University of Film and Arts
- Traditional Chinese: 崇右影藝科技大學
- Simplified Chinese: 崇右影艺科技大学
Transcriptions
Standard Mandarin
- Hanyu Pinyin: Chóngyòu Yǐngyì Kējì Dàxué
Southern Min
- Hokkien POJ: Chông-iū Éng-gē Kho-ki Tāi-ha̍k

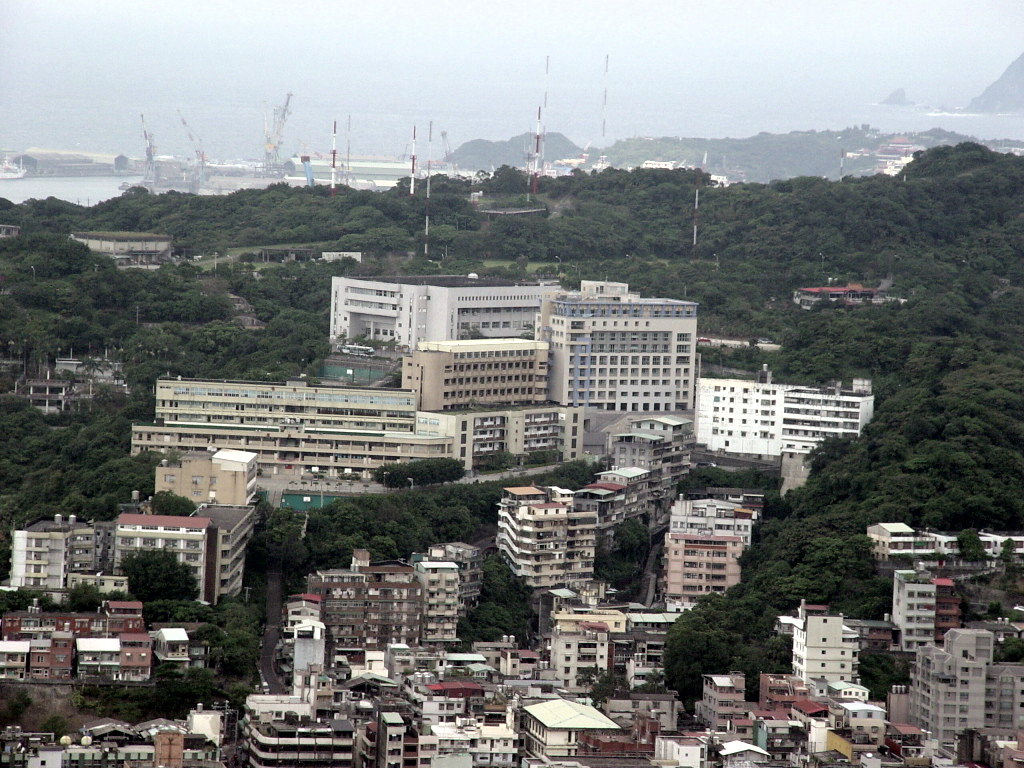
Campus in Keelung, Taiwan.

Chungyu University of Film and Arts (Chinese: 崇右影藝科技大學; Pe̍h-ōe-jī: Chông-iū Éng-gē Kho-ki Tāi-ha̍k) is a private university located in Xinyi District, Keelung, Taiwan.

CYUFA offers undergraduate and graduate degree programs in film and television, animation, digital media, visual communication design, and performing arts.

The university has five colleges: College of Film and Television, College of Animation and Digital Arts, College of Design, College of Performing Arts, and College of General Education.

== History ==
Chungyu University of Film and Arts was originally established in 1967 as the Chungyu Junior College of Business Administration. On 1 August 2003, the school was upgraded to the Chungyu Institute of Technology (CIT). On 1 August 2017, the school changed its name to the Chungyu University of Film and Arts.

== Faculties ==
- Department of Accounting Information
- Department of Applied Foreign Languages
- Department of Business Administration
- Department of Finance
- Department of Financial and Economic Law
- Department of Information Law
- Department of Information Management
- Department of International Business
- Department of Leisure, Recreation and Tourism Management
- Department of Multimedia and Game Science
- Department of Visual Communication Design

== Notable natives ==
- Hsing Hui, actress

== Transportation ==
The university is accessible within walking distance east from Keelung Station of Taiwan Railway.

== See also ==
- List of universities in Taiwan
