= Packages from Daddy =

- Theatrical release poster
- Chinese: 心靈時鐘
- Hanyu Pinyin: Xīn Líng Shí Zhōng
- Directed by: Tsai Yin-chuan
- Written by: Tsai Yin-chuan
- Produced by: Tsai Yin-chuan
- Starring: Fann Wong; Lee Lee-zen; Sieh Fei; Yu Jo-ching
- Cinematography: Liu Yun-hou
- Edited by: Chen Hsiao-dong
- Music by: Huang Yu-hsiang; Lin Shang-te
- Production company: The Movie Bird Films
- Distributed by: Vie Vision Pictures
- Release dates: October 17, 2016 (HKAFF); November 18, 2016 (Taiwan)
- Running time: 98 minutes
- Country: Taiwan
- Language: Mandarin
- Box office: NT$880,000

Packages from Daddy is a 2016 Taiwanese drama film written, produced and directed by Tsai Yin-chuan. The film stars Fann Wong, Lee Lee-zen, Sieh Fei and Yu Jo-ching, and co-stars Kaiser Chuang and Ding Ning. It was released in theaters on November 18, 2016.

== Premise ==
Lan, a nine-year-old boy, lives happily with his parents and sister in a peaceful seaside town; until Lan comes home one day to find his father dead, sending his life into disarray as the family grieves. Not long after, Lan receives a package containing an odd-shaped clock sent by his father before his death. Lan tries to fix the clock which no longer moves, but in vain. Eventually he discovers that the clock is in fact a marine chronometer with a backstory...

== Cast ==
- Fann Wong as Mom (Fang Hui-ying)
- Lee Lee-zen as Dad (Yeh Wen-li)
- Sieh Fei as Yeh Lan
- Yu Jo-ching as Sister (Yeh Cheng)
- Kaiser Chuang as Mr. Chou
- Ding Ning as Aunt
- Fu Lei as Grandpa Wang
- Tang Chih-ping as Son of Grandpa Wang
- Helena Hsu as Hui-ying's sister
- Huang Tsai-yi as Sister in church
- Wu Pong-fong as Angler
- Hsiao Yeh as himself

== Soundtrack ==
=== Featured songs ===
No.	Title	Writer(s)	Performer	Length
1.	"I Don't Care 我不在乎"	Jay Hsieh, Tsai Yin-chuan	Jay Hsieh, Weilee
2.	"The First Stone 第一顆石頭"	Shawn Hsu	Shawn Hsu	03:34
