= The Sound of Happiness =

Taiwan TV series

- Chinese: 炮仔聲
- Hokkien POJ: Phàu-á-siaⁿ
- Genre: Melodrama; Family; Romance
- Written by: Huang Yuqin; Lin Chenghong; Wu Xili; Zheng Yuanyuan; Lin Qiwen; Yang Yihua; Jin Bin; You Teng; Qian Yi; Lin Jiahua; Wang Xiangqi; Lu Wanjun; Luo Caiyu
- Screenplay by: Haowangcai Screenwriting Team
- Directed by: Gong Meifu; Liu Jianlu; Zhuo Shaojun; Lin Sen; Zuo Xiaohu; Lian Chunli
- Starring: Chen Guanlin; Athena Lee Yen; Wang Yujie; Chen Zhiqiang; Wu Wanjun; Chen Yufeng; Chen Xiaojing; Jiang Hongen
- Country of origin: Taiwan
- Original languages: Taiwanese Hokkien; Chinese
- No. of episodes: 682

Production
- Executive producers: Guo Jianhong hao Jinhu; Lai Wanrong
- Running time: 80 minutes (first episode), 150 minutes on Monday-Thursday, 135 minutes on Friday (with commercial breaks); 40 minutes (Finale)
- Production company: TransWorld Production Co.

Original release
- Network: SET Taiwan
- Release: 6 January 2018 – 9 August 2020

The Sound of Happiness (Chinese: 炮仔聲; Pe̍h-ōe-jī: Phàu-á-siaⁿ; lit. 'Sound of Firecrackers Banging') is a Taiwanese Hokkien television drama that began airing on SET Taiwan in Taiwan on 26 December 2018, from Mondays to Fridays, and ended its broadcast on 5 August 2020. The series started production on 22 November 2018. The series is aired every weeknight at 8pm and is simulcast one hour later on SET Taiwan's sister channel, SET Drama.

== Synopsis ==
Wu is a senior police officer has always wanted a son to carry his family name and join the force. However, he and wife are bequeathed with four daughters! As a doting father, his chief objective is to help them find happiness in their marriages. In this charming drama, Wu & his wife become their daughters’ greatest haven, through the ups and downs they face as married women.

== Cast ==
- Norman Chen as Lin Zhi Ming and Liu Tian Ding
- Athena Lee Yen as Wu Jia Yun
- John Chen as Zhang Zheng Hao and Hu Li Hai
- Shuwei Zhang as Mo Hao Tian
- Cocco Wu as Wu Jia Wen (Coco)
- Margaret Wang as Wang Yan Xi
- James Chen as Lin Zhi Wen
- Vivi Chen as Cai Yun Ru
- Nic Chiang as Jiang Hong Jie
- Michell Lin as Ren Yu Tang
- Liu Hsiao-Yi as Ye Li Mei
- Eric Huang as Zhao Tian Yu
- Johny Liu as Li Jian Hua
- Vicky Tseng as He Xin Di
- Grace Lin as Wu Jia Xiu
- Lance Yu as Zhan Wei Kai/David
- Richard Shen as Fan Zhu Sheng/Robert
- Star Lin as Li Rong Guang
- Bella Zhang as Ni Xiao Xin
- Miao Zhen as Huang Li Lin
- Zhang Qin as Yang Ah Mei
- Huang Jian Qun as Lin Qing Long
- Michelle Ho as Yao Ming Zhu
- Lin Zai Pei as Wu Guo Hui
- Liu Mei Ling as Ceng Mei Ru
- Sunny Li as Wu Jia Xuan
- Josh Wu as Wu Jia Long
- Peilin Tsai as Ceng Huan Huan
- Hsieh Chiung-hsuan as Xie Bao Xiu
- Huang Yu Rong as Jin Yong Jian
- Ruby Lin as Lin Shan Shan
- Wang Man Jiao as Ah Shui Po
- He Guan Ying as Cai Fu Gui
- Su Yi Qing as Chen Yue Xia
- Chen Ting as Zhan Kun Mao
- Li Rui Shen as Yin Jun Nan
- Elissa Liao as Li Bao Na
- Zhu Yong De as Wang Shi Chang
- Liu Hsiu-wen as Chen Yu Yan
- Xu Jun Jun as Fang Mei Yun/Luo Anna
- Hsu Heng as Xu Ming Qiang
- Mong Ning as Lin Xiao Ke
- Rex Wu as Cai Chong Ren
- Franco Chiang as Zhou Rui Yuan
- Kelly Ko as Shen Xiu Chun
- Mai Hai Lin as Zhou Jia Mai
- Ling-shan Wu as Zhou Yong Cheng
- Kiki Lin as Zhou Yong Qi
- Lara Chen as Xu Pei Qi/Nai Cha
- Josie Leung as Shen Fang Zi
- Danny Chen as Ceng Guo Hao/Ryan
- On Xue Bin as Luo Guan Ting
- Lee Chia-Yi as Luo Hui Lin
- Wu Yi Han as Zhao Dora
- Huang Chong Lan as Chen Dong/Chen Li Min
- Kai Hsu as Andrew
- Lin Yi Fang as Chen Tian En
- Junior Han as Chen Jian Hong
- Ho Yi Pei as Chen Wei Xin/Chloe
- Vins Zheng as Jiang Can Tang/K-Dong
- Yuki Hsu as Jiang Yong Qi/Angela
- Lin Pei Jun as Fang Bi Lian
- Gao Shan Feng as Qian Jin
- Elsie Yeh as Lin Luo Shi/Rose
- Li Xin as Fang Xin Yu
- Akio Chen as Liu Ah Yi
- Patrick Lee as Liu Da Wei
- Ding Ning as Zhang Hui Xin
- Joyce Yu as Ceng Kai Xin
- Ah Loong as Gu Wen Yan
- Cheng Peng Gao as Ye Qing Gong
- Carolyn Chen as Jia Man Yi/Maggie
- Li Fang Wen as Du Ba La
- Chen Bo Han as Ah V
- Pan Li Li as Ye Qiu Kou
- Ricie Fun as Xia Ying Ying
- Yuan Li Shan as LiShan
- Troy Chu as Kai Wen
- Blair Chu as Zheng Ting
- Chen Di Yuan as Zhang Di Yuan
- James Cheng as Jiang Cheng En
- Hsieh Chi-Wen as Li Guan Jun
- Mei Fang as Wang Li Hong
- Hong Rui Xia as He Su Jiu
- He Jie Rou as Xu An An
- Zhan Jia Lin as Zhao Chye
- Li Bo Xiang as Jia Bao Yu/Steven
- Lai Ping Xuan as Dian Dian
- Leo Ding as Ding Shi Min
- Jimmy Chen as Tony

== International broadcast ==
=== Malaysia ===
The drama aired on Astro Hua Hee Dai in the 9:30pm timeslot every weeknight, running from January 10, 2019 and ending on August 14, 2020. On 8TV, the show is currently airing since March 16, 2020 in the 3:30-5:30pm timeslot, showing 2 one-hour format episodes every weeknight.

=== Vietnam ===
The show in currently airing on Echannel under the name "Tiếng Pháo Vu Quy" every night in the 6:00-8:00pm timeslot (two episodes a day) since August 28, 2019. This makes Vietnam the first country to air the show under a 60-minute format. But now, Echannel only air 1 episode/day.

=== Singapore ===
The show airs 7pm to 9:15pm every weeknight on Jia Le Channel since September 23, 2019.
