= Fu Lei (actor) =

Taiwanese actor

- 傅雷
- Born: 7 May 1950 (age 75); Taiwan
- Occupation: Actor
- Years active: 1974–present

Chinese name
- Traditional Chinese: 傅雷
Transcriptions
Standard Mandarin
- Hanyu Pinyin: Fù Léi
Southern Min
- Hokkien POJ: Pò͘ Lûi

Fu Lei (Chinese: 傅雷; Pe̍h-ōe-jī: Pò͘ Lûi, born 7 May 1950) is a Taiwanese actor.

== Filmography (incomplete) ==
=== Films ===
Year	English title	Original title	Role	Notes
1977	The Naval Commandos	海軍突擊隊		
1977	The Youthful Delinquents	法網追踪		
1980	Living and Loving	女兒心		
1982	Naughty Dog	頑皮狗		
1997	Got No Choice	赤色玫瑰		
1997	Roller Blade Killer	非常保鏢		
2007	Looking for Bali	尋找巴利		TV film
2011	War Game 229	燃燒吧！歐吉桑	Yin Guangzheng	
2014	Black & White: The Dawn of Justice	痞子英雄 2：黎明升起	Wang Yurong	
2015	Single for 10 Days	十日單身	Dong Jian	TV film
2016	Packages from Daddy	心靈時鐘	Grandpa Wang	

=== TV Dramas ===
Year	English title	Original title	Role	Notes
1988	Moment in Peking	京華煙雲	Yao Sze-an	
1991	The Four Brothers of Peking	京城四少	Tong Shan	
1993	Justice Pao	包青天		several unrelated characters
1994	The Seven Heroes and Five Gallants	七俠五義	Xu Qing	
1996	Guan Gong	關公	Guan Yu's father	
1996	Dream of the Red Chamber	紅樓夢	Jia Zheng	
1997	Raise the Red Lantern	大紅燈籠高高掛	Chen Zuoqian	
2002	Come to My Place	來我家吧		
2007	Daughter of the Sun	太陽的女兒	Grandpa Hua	
2011	Soldiers	勇士們	Song Zheyuan	Segment 1: "Glorious Moment" (光榮時刻)
2012	Sweet Sweet Bodyguard	剩女保鏢	Qin Qihong	
2013	A Hint of You	美味的想念	Fu Changnian	
2013	Deja Vu	回到愛以前	Xu Zhenji	
2014	Aim High	22K夢想高飛	Yu Rongfa	
2014	Native Place	原鄉		
2015	Love Cuisine	料理高校生	Han Jiaxiong	
2015	Someone Like You	聽見幸福		
2015	Love or Spend	戀愛鄰距離	Pei Yongjin	
2016	V-Focus	獨家保鑣	Zhou Tiexiong	

== Awards and nominations ==
Year	#	Award	Category	Work	Result
2007	42nd	Golden Bell Awards	Best Actor (Miniseries or TV Film)	Looking for Bali	Nominated
