= The Perfect Girl (2017 film) =

2017 film by Remus Kam

- Theatrical release poster
- Directed by: Remus Kam
- Screenplay by: Wang Yu-chen
- Based on: The Perfect Girl by Ye Congling
- Produced by: Angus Liu
- Starring: Tia Lee; Ray Chang; Hsieh Tsu-wu
- Cinematography: Yu Shang-pin
- Edited by: Hamster Low
- Music by: Chris K
- Production companies: Omar Media; Red Element
- Distributed by: Vie Vision Pictures; CMC Entertainment
- Release dates: 13 April 2017 (Malaysia); 28 April 2017 (Taiwan)
- Running time: 95 minutes
- Country: Taiwan
- Language: Mandarin
- Box office: NT$4.8 million (Taiwan) RM400,000 (Malaysia)

The Perfect Girl (Chinese: 最完美的女孩) is a 2017 Taiwanese thriller film directed by Remus Kam and adapted from Ye Congling's 2007 web novel of the same name. The film stars Ray Chang, Tia Lee and Hsieh Tsu-wu.

== Premise ==
Yeh Hsin is a top student in criminal psychology while her father is a distinguished cardiologist. Her boyfriend, Lin Miao, is a young forensic specialist. Everything seems perfect for Yeh Hsin until human remains are discovered in her backyard one rainy night. Around the same time Yeh receives a mysterious letter warning her that her life is about to change drastically.

== Cast ==
- Tia Lee as Yeh Hsin
- Ray Chang as Lin Miao
- Hsieh Tsu-wu as Yeh Ching-hsiao
- Josie Leung as Dr. Alice
- Hero Tai as Li Wei
- Antony Kuo as Chi Hsiao-feng (Chi-ge)
- Richard Shen as Li Shu
- Christina Tseng as One of Yeh Hsin's personalities
- Vicky Tseng as One of Yeh Hsin's personalities
- Jasmine Chen as Mi Chu
- Charlene An as Hsia Chih-huan
- Tani Lin as Keng Ti
- Kila Chin as Hsu Mei-chih
- Isabella Chien as Wen Ya-ching
- Nico An as An Chen-yu
