= SET Taiwan =

- Country: Taiwan
- Broadcast area: Taiwan
- Network: Sanlih E-Television
- Headquarters: Taipei, Taiwan

History
- Launched: September 1993

Links
- Website: http://www.settv.com.tw/taiwan/

SET Taiwan (Chinese: 三立台灣台) is a television channel of the Sanlih E-Television in Taiwan, launched in September 1993. It mainly broadcasts Taiwanese drama.

== Productions Drama ==
=== Daily ===
- Ah Bian and Ah Jane
- Accompany Me Through Life
- Nine Refers to the Bride
- Taiwan Ah Cheng
- Negative Line of Tears
- Fiery Thunderbolt
- Sky and Earth Has Affection
- Taiwan Tornado
- Golden Ferris Wheel
- Unique Flavor
- I Shall Succeed
- Love Above All
- My Family My Love
- Lee Family Reunion
- Wives
- The Heart of Woman
- Ordinary Love
- Taste of Life
- In The Family
- The Sound of Happiness
- 【【Proud of you]

=== Friday ===
- Way Back into Love
- Rainy Night Flower
- Father
- Flavor of Life
- White Magnolia
- Once Upon a Time in Beitou
- Our Mother
- Life of Pearl
- An Adopted Daughter
- La Grande Chaumiere Violette
- My Sister
