= Taste of Life =

Taiwanese drama television series

- Chinese: 甘味人生
- Hokkien POJ: Kam-bī Jîn-seng
- Genre: Taiwanese drama
- Written by: Chu Guo; Chen Hao; Huang Yuqin; Xiang Qi
- Screenplay by: Chen Hui Zhen, Lai Wan Rong
- Directed by: Lui Jian-Li; Chen Jun-Ren; Liao Feihong; Zhang Yiteng
- Starring: Wang Shih-hsien; Athena Lee Yen; Eric Huang; Angel Han; Vicky Tseng; Carolyn Chen
- Country of origin: Taiwan
- Original language: Taiwanese Hokkien
- No. of episodes: 491 (original run); 1100 (overseas version)

Production
- Executive producers: Kuo Chien-Hung; Yu Weizhong
- Running time: 150 minutes on Monday-Thursday, 135 minutes on Friday (with commercial breaks)
- Production companies: Shenghua Entertainment Communication Co. Ltd. TransWorld Production Co.

Original release
- Network: SET Taiwan
- Release: July 28, 2015 – June 14, 2017

Taste of Life (Chinese: 甘味人生; Pe̍h-ōe-jī: kambi jinseng; literally "Sweet Taste of Life") is a Taiwanese Hokkien television drama that began airing on SET Taiwan in Taiwan on 28 July 2015, from Mondays to Fridays.

== Synopsis ==
Chu-Tsai, Chao and his wife have five children. After spending his life developing soy sauce products, Chu-Tsai wishes that one of his kids can follow his footsteps and take over his business, though he respects their own passions and aspirations. Because of their father's invention dream, the Chao brother's lives are about to change...

== Cast ==
- Wang Shih-hsien as Zhao Xinda
- Athena Lee Yen as Chen Yixuan and Jiang Jiang hao
- Eric Huang as Zhao Yingkai
- Angel Han as Yang Zixin
- Vicky Tseng as Zhou Xiaojing
- Franco Chiang as Jiang Da Tong
- Carolyn Chen as Jiang Qian Qian
- Lung Shao-hua as King
- Miao Ke-li as Kayla (cameo)
- Frankie Huang as Hsien Ge (cameo)
- Grace Lin as Yan Qiao Ling
- Angus Hiseh as Gao Ke Wei
- Cocco Wu as An Chen Xi and Chen Yi Mei
- Norman Chen as Li Jia Liang and Zhuge Yu
- Chunya Chao as Luo Shou Zhen
- James Chen as Li Jia Ming
- Margaret Wang as Wang Le Le
- Ruby Lin as Gao Yuan Yuan
- Nic Chang as Shi Da Lin
- Elissa Liao as Lai Tian Jie
- Joyce Yu as Weng Mei Ji and Lin Qiu Ping
- Serene Wang as Liu Ya Lin
- Leo Ting as Huang Wen Chang

== Broadcast ==
Network	Country	Airing Date	Timeslot
SET Taiwan	Taiwan	July 28, 2015	Monday to Thursday 8:00-10:30 pm Friday 8:00-10:15 pm
Drama SET	Taiwan	August 4, 2015	Monday to Thursday 8:00-10:30 pm Friday 8:00-10:15 pm
Jia Le Channel	Singapore	April 14, 2016	Monday to Friday 7:00-9:15 pm
Mediacorp Channel 8	Singapore	November 7, 2018	Monday to Friday 4.30-5.30 pm Tuesday to Saturday 4.00-5.00 am
Astro Hua Hee Dai	Malaysia	July 24, 2016	Sunday 4:30-6:30 pm
Echannel VTVCab 5	Vietnam	September 1, 2016	Everyday 6:00-8:00 pm

== International broadcast ==
=== Singapore broadcast ===
The series was broadcast on weekdays from 4.30pm to 5.30 pm due to local broadcast laws prohibiting radio or television broadcasts in Chinese dialects, the show was dubbed into Mandarin when it aired on Singapore's MediaCorp Channel 8, thus making it the first channel to broadcast the show in Mandarin.

==== Repeat Telecast (2019) ====
It repeated its run from Tuesday - Saturday from 4.00am to 6.00am, succeeding Mom's House. From 12 Jun 2020, it air from 4.00am to 5.00am, airing the previous weekday episode.

==== Repeat Telecast (2023) ====
It repeated its run from 14 September 2023 at 11.30am, succeeding Spring Flower which ended the same day. From 18 September 2023, it air from 10.30am to 12.30pm, airing 2 episodes and concluded its repeat telecast on 19 May 2026 at 11.30am, preceding 100% Wife which repeated at the same day.
