= Athena Lee Yen =

Taiwanese actress

Athena Lee Yen/Cloud Yin
- Born: Lee Chiu Yen; 20 November 1981 (age 44); New Taipei City, Taiwan
- Education: New Taipei Municipal Jui-Fang Industrial High School
- Occupation: Actress
- Years active: 2001–present
- Spouses: Hsieh Dien-lin (m. 2013; div. 2015) Chen Mao-rong (陳茂榮) (m. 2023)

Chinese name
- Traditional Chinese: 李燕
Transcriptions
Standard Mandarin
- Hanyu Pinyin: Lǐ Yān
- Wade–Giles: Lee Yen

Chinese name
- Traditional Chinese: 李秋燕
Transcriptions
Standard Mandarin
- Hanyu Pinyin: Lǐ Qiūyān
- Wade–Giles: Lee Chiu-Yen

Athena Lee Yen or Cloud Yin (born 20 November 1981) is a Taiwanese actress who graduated from the New Taipei Municipal Jui-Fang Industrial High School.

== Private life ==
She married Hsieh Tien-lin who was chairperson of Changhua County and the chairperson of the Republic of China Basketball Association.

== Filmography ==
- 2001
  - Key Children (Chinese: 鑰匙兒; pinyin: Yào shi er)
  - According To The First Mountain Day (Chinese: 後山日先照; pinyin: Hòu shān rì xiān zhào)
- 2002
  - Do Not Go To Work Today (Chinese: 今天不上班; pinyin: Jīn tiān bù shàng bān)
  - The First Theater - Acacia Dream (Chinese: 第一劇場-相思夢; pinyin: Dì yī jùchǎng-xiāngsī mèng)
- 2003
  - The First Theater - Trinidad Love (Chinese: 第一劇場-千里情緣; pinyin: Dì yī jùc hǎng-qiānlǐ qíng yuán)
  - A Good Man Goes (Chinese: 再見阿郎; pinyin: Zài jiàn ā láng)
  - Home (Chinese: 家; pinyin: Jiā)
  - Taiwan Tornado (Chinese: 戲說台灣; pinyin: Xìshuō tái wān)
  - Sentient World (Chinese: 天地有情; pinyin: Tiān dì yǒu qíng)
- 2004
  - Taiwan Tornado (Chinese: 台灣龍捲風; pinyin: Táiwān lóng juǎn fēng)
- 2005
  - Golden Ferris Wheel (Chinese: 金色摩天輪; pinyin: Jīnsè mó tiān lún）
- 2006
  - Life Abroad (Chinese: 出外人生; pinyin: Chū wài rén shēng）
  - Burning Paradise (Chinese: 燃燒天堂; pinyin: Rán shāo tiān táng）
- 2007
  - Unique Flavor (Chinese: 天下第一味; pinyin: Tiān xià dì yī wèi）
  - Liu Bo Wen, The Legendary Liu Bo Wen (Chinese: 神機妙算劉伯溫; pinyin: Shén jī miào suàn liú bó wēn)
- 2008
  - Love Above All／Pay It Forward (Chinese: 真情滿天下; pinyin: Zhēn qíng mǎn tiān xià)
- 2009
  - Parents (Chinese: 天下父母心; pinyin: Tiānxià fùmǔ xīn)
- 2011
  - Family Harmony (Chinese: 家和萬事興; pinyin: Jiā hé wàn shì xīng)
  - Hand (Chinese: 牽手; pinyin: Qiānshǒu)
- 2013
  - Backlight Love (Chinese: 逆光真愛; pinyin: Nì guāng zhēn ài)
  - Ordinary Love (Chinese: 世間情; pinyin: Shìjiān qíng)
- 2015
  - Taste of Life (Chinese: 甘味人生; pinyin: Gān wèi rén shēng)
- 2017
  - In The Family (Chinese: 一家人; pinyin: Yī jiā rén)
- 2018
  - The Sound of Happiness (Chinese: 炮仔聲; Pe̍h-ōe-jī: Phàu-á-siaⁿ; lit. 'Sound of Firecrackers Banging'
