= Weng Li-you =

- 翁立友
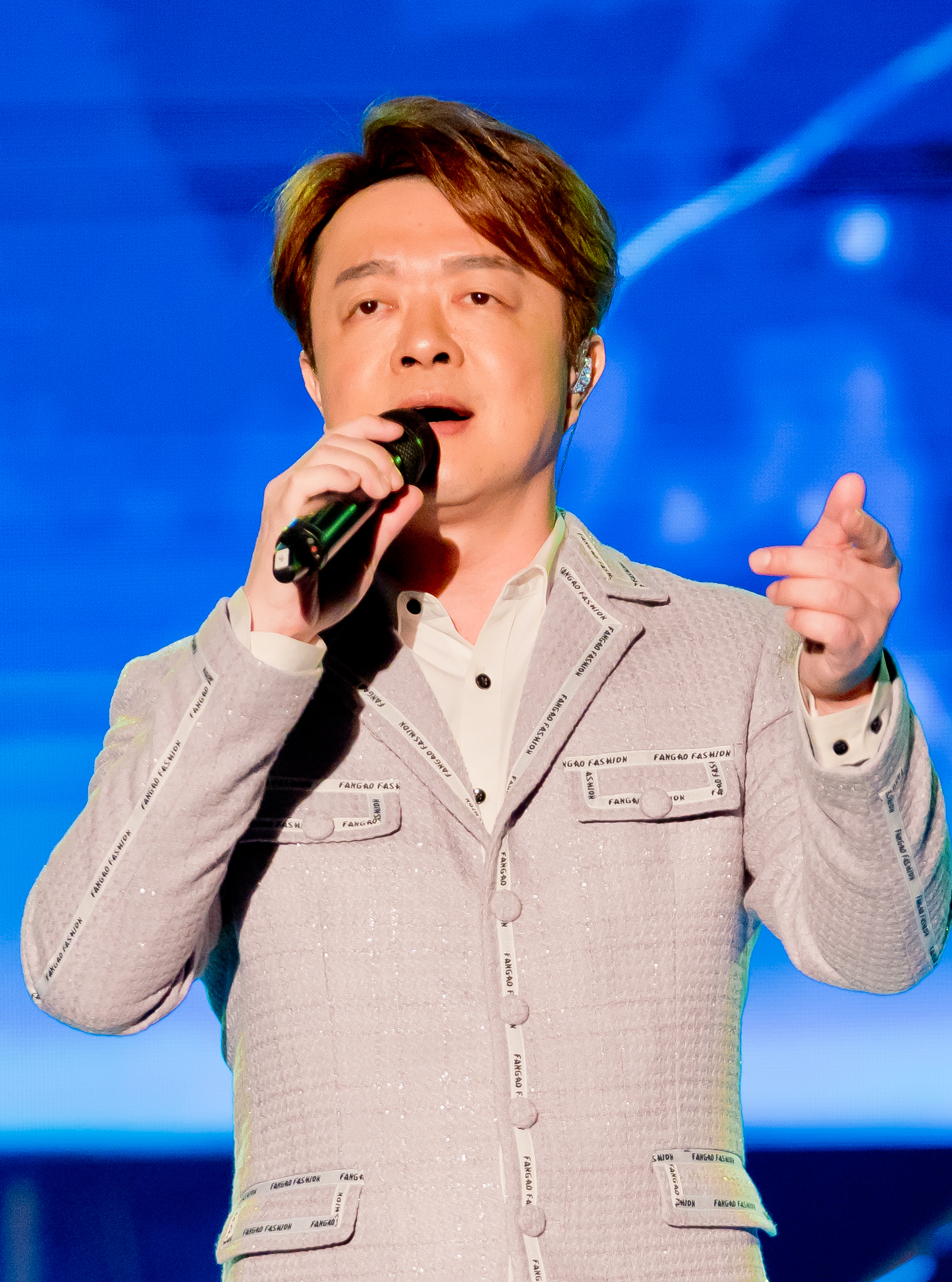
- Born: 9 May 1975 (age 51); Changhua County, Taiwan
- Occupations: Singer, songwriter
- Years active: 1998–present
- Awards: Golden Melody Awards Best Taiwanese Male Singer (2009)
- Musical career
- Also known as: Only You
- Origin: Taiwan
- Genre: Hokkien pop
- Instruments: Vocals, Saxophone
- Label: HCM Music

Chinese name
- Traditional Chinese: 翁立友
- Simplified Chinese: 翁立友
Transcriptions
Standard Mandarin
- Hanyu Pinyin: Wēng Lìyǒu
Yue: Cantonese
- Jyutping: Jung1 Lap6 Jau5
Southern Min
- Tâi-lô: Ang Li̍p-iú

Weng Li-you (Chinese: 翁立友; pinyin: Wēng Lìyǒu; born 9 May 1975), known as Only You, is a Taiwanese Hokkien pop singer.

Weng is known as Only You and began singing in 1998. He won the Best Taiwanese Male Singer award at the 20th Golden Melody Awards. Many of Weng's compositions have been used as theme songs for Taiwanese dramas.
