= New Taipei Municipal Jui-Fang Industrial High School =

Coordinates: 25.1105°N 121.8036°E

Location
- No.60, Ruifang St., Ruifang Dist., New Taipei City 22441, Taiwan (R.O.C.)

Information
- Other name: 新北市立瑞芳高級工業職業學校
- Type: New Taipei City Vocational school and Comprehensive high school
- Established: 1934
- School district: Taiwan; New Taipei City Ruifang District
- Principal: Mr. Ching-Nan, Lin
- Website: jfvs.ntpc.edu.tw

New Taipei Municipal Jui-Fang Industrial High School is a professional school located in New Taipei City of Taiwan. The industrial high school's address is at No.60, Ruifang St., Ruifang District., New Taipei City 22441, Taiwan. It is colloquially known as JFVS. The school was founded in 1934 and the area of the main campus is 4.4273 hectares. The current principal is Ching-Nan Lin.
