= Unique Flavor =

Taiwanese Hokkien television drama

- Chinese: 天下第一味
- Hokkien POJ: Thian‑hā-tē‑it-bī
- Genre: Taiwanese drama
- Written by: Lin Jiuyu (林久愉); Huang Qinlan (黄沁岚); Ye Fengying (:zh:叶凤英
- Directed by: Fung Kai (冯凯)
- Starring: Chen Chao-jung; Chou You-ting (周幼婷); Mayko Chen (陈仙梅); David Wang (王耀庆) later stage Elsie Ye (叶全真); Jiang Hong-En (江宏恩); Vins Yi (伊正)
- Opening theme: 离开 by 江宏恩 and 詹曼鈴
- Ending theme: 宝贝子 by Lin Shan
- Country of origin: Taiwan
- Original language: Taiwanese Hokkien
- No. of episodes: 286

Production
- Producer: Jiang Mingye (蒋明烨)
- Running time: 105 minutes (with commercial breaks); 90 minutes (episodes 1, 134-138); 120 minutes (episodes 32, 251-273)

Original release
- Network: SET Taiwan
- Release: 16 August 2006 – 19 September 2007

Related
- The Golden Ferris Wheel; I Shall Succeed

Unique Flavor (Chinese: 天下第一味) is a Taiwanese Hokkien television drama that began airing on SET Taiwan in Taiwan on 16 August 2006, from Mondays to Fridays, and ended on 19 September 2007, with a total of 286 episodes.

It is directed by Fung Kai, with advisor Zhou You (周游).

The slogan for Unique Flavor is Good, Interesting, True (好味、趣味、真情味).

== Cast ==
The casts are classified according to the families they belong to in the drama.

=== Chens (Chef Wan's Traditional Flavours) ===
Cast	Role	Character / Relationship / Career	Episodes appeared / Status
No cast	Chen Qinghai	Father of Chen Wanzong; Grandfather of Chen Huiwen, Chen Shengfen and Chen Shengchang; Most senior among the Top Five Chef; Killed by Liu Mingfeng	He did not appear at all.
Liao Jun	Chen Wanzong	Nicknamed as 'Wan'; Known as Chef Wan; Father of Chen Huiwen, Chen Shengfen and Chen Shengchang; Foster father of Liu Shengjie; Son of Chen Qinghai	He appeared in all the episodes. The signboard of Chef Wan's Traditional Flavours was removed in episode 32 and remounted in episode 286.
Di Ying	Lin Xiuhong	Wife of Chen Wanzong; Mother of Chen Huiwen, Chen Shengfen and Chen Shengchang; Foster Mother of Liu Shengjie; Friend of Cai Qiumin and Yang Huimei	She appeared in all the episodes.
Xie Lijin	Chen Shengfen	Youngest daughter of Chen Wanzong and Lin Xiuhong; Has a troll but cheerful personality Had a crush first on Zhou Qiang, then Yang Zhiyuan, and then Gao Shoushan	She appeared in all the episodes.
David Wang	Chen Shengchang	Second son of Chen Wanzong and Lin Xiuhong; Has extreme personalities Husband of Hong Xiaolin	He appeared in all the episodes.
Mayko Chen	Hong Xiaolin	Only daughter of Hong Kunlong; Has congenital heart defect Wife of Chen Shengchang	She appeared in episodes 1-240 and later episode 286.

=== Lius (Tai Mei Enterprise) ===
Cast	Role	Character / Relationship / Career	Episodes appeared / Status
Shi Feng	Liu Mingfeng	Second in terms of seniority among the Top Five Chef; Father of Liu Wenhua and Liu Wenqin; Godfather of Liu Chongren; Grandfather of Liu Shengjie and Liu Junying; Foster grandfather of Chen Huiwen; Had a grudge with Chen Qinghai	He appeared in all the episodes.
Xu Guiying	Zhao Jingyue	Mother of Liu Wenqin; Grandmother of Liu Shengjie and Liu Junying; Wife of Liu Mingfeng; Foster grandmother of Chen Huiwen; Childhood friend of Wang Yixiong	She appeared in all the episodes.
Josh Huo	Liu Wenqin	Son of Liu Mingfeng and Zhao Jingyue; Father of Liu Shengjie	He appeared in episode 1. He witnessed Yang Huimei plunged into the sea. He killed himself in episode 1 by doing so.
Ann Lee (before plastic surgery); Gail Lin (after plastic surgery)	Yang Huimei; Auntie Hao	Nicknamed 'Hao'; Wife of Liu Wenqin; Mother of Liu Shengjie; Foster mother of Chen Huiwen; Mother-in-law of Chen Huiwen; Daughter-in-law of Liu Mingfeng and Zhao Jingyue; Younger sister of Yang Tiansong; Aunt of Yang Zhiyuan; Friend of Lin Xiuhong and Cai Qiumin	The version before plastic surgery appeared in episode 1 falling off a cliff. Saved by Zhou Yong and went for plastic surgery. The version after plastic surgery appeared in episodes 40-286.
Chen Chao-jung	Liu Shengjie; Chen Shengjie	Husband of Chen Huiwen; Adopted son of Chen Wanzong and Lin Xiuhong; Grandson of Liu Mingfeng and Zhao Jingyue; Son of Liu Wenqin and Yang Huimei; Identity once swapped with Chen Huiwen; Only successor of the "Top Five Chef"; Leader of the new Top Five Chef; He married Huiwen in episode 186.	He appeared in all the episodes. He married Huiwen in episode 186.
Chou You-ting	Chen Huiwen; Liu Huiwen	Also known as 'Wang-wang' (when she lost her memory); Wife of Liu Shengjie; Granddaughter of Chen Qinghai; Daughter of Chen Wanzong and Lin Xiuhong; Elder sister of Chen Shengfen and Chen Shengchang; Adopted granddaughter of Liu Mingfeng and Zhao Jingyue; Adopted daughter of Liu Wenqin, Yang Huimei, Liu Chongren and Xu Mingzhu; Adoptive niece of Qiu Yonghe and Liu Wenhua; Adoptive cousin of Liu Junying; Adoptive niece of Yang Tiansong; Granddaughter-in-law of Liu Mingfeng and Zhao Jingyue; Daughter-in-law of Liu Wenqin and Yang Huimei; Friend of Sun Qiaoqiao; Identity once swapped with Liu Shengjie	She appeared in all the episodes. She married Shengjie in episode 186.
Yang Ching-huang	Liu Chongren	Most junior among the Top Five Chef; Godson of Liu Mingfeng; Foster father of Chen Huiwen; Father of Wang Ting; Godfather of Sakurako	He appeared in all the episodes.
Miao Ke-li (Wu Kang-Hwa)	Xu Mingzhu	Wife of Liu Chongren; Foster mother of Chen Huiwen; Mother of Wang Ting; Godmother of Sakurako	She appeared in all the episodes.
Wang Tong	Wang Ting	Nicknamed as 'Ting-ting'; Daughter of Mingzhu and Chongren; Adopted daughter of Wang Yixiong; Later fell in love with Dachuan	She appeared in episodes 216-286.
Ting Chen	Qiu Yonghe	Husband of Liu Wenhua; Father of Liu Junying; Married into the Liu family as a son-in-law Owed Hong Kunlong flavours due to his marriage	He appeared in all the episodes.
Chao Yung-hsin	Liu Wenhua	Daughter of Liu Mingfeng; Wife of Qiu Yonghe; Elder sister of Wenqin; Mother of Liu Junying; Once owed a huge gambling debt at the illegal gambling house owned by Hong Kunlong	She appeared in all the episodes.
Lin Youxing	Liu Junying	Son of Liu Wenhua and Qiu Yonghe; Grandson of Liu Mingfeng and Zhao Jingyue; Once had a crush on Chen Huiwen; Husband of Liao Shujuan	He appeared in episodes 20-240.
Fang Bing	Liao Shujuan	Nicknamed as 'Juan'; Taken care of by Zhou Qiang and his sister after her grandmother died Second daughter of Liao Jinsheng; Wife of Liu Junying	She appeared in episodes 88-240.

=== Liaos (King of Soups) ===
Cast	Role	Character / Relationship / Career	Episodes appeared / Status
Li Yufen	Auntie Man	Nicknamed as 'Man'; Known as 'Auntie Man'; Mother of Liao Jinsheng; Raised granddaughter Liao Shujuan	She appeared in episodes 88-115. She then died.
Xia Jingting	Liao Jinsheng	Third in terms of seniority among the Top Five Chef; Son of Auntie Man; Father of Liao Shujun and Liao Shujuan; Ex-husband of Zhang Suru; Specialises in soups and likes to gamble	He appeared in episodes 94-286.
Tina Yan	Liao Shujun	Nicknamed as 'Vicky'; First daughter of Liao Jinsheng; Elder sister of Liao Shujuan; Bargirl background; Later worked at Tai Mei	She appeared in episodes 116-214.

=== Zhous (Otsu-mi-ya) ===
Otsu-mi-ya is a Japanese restaurant in the drama with the name in Chinese characters/Kanji "乙味屋". It is pronounced as おつみや(otsu-mi-ya) in Japanese and Yǐ wèi wū in Mandarin. The Japanese pronunciation was never mentioned in the drama.

Cast	Role	Character / Relationship / Career	Episodes appeared / Status
No cast	Zhou Yong	Nicknamed as 'Yong'; Fourth in terms of seniority among the Top Five Chef; Father of Zhou Qiang and Zhou Jiayu; Saved Yang Huimei who fell off a cliff	He did not appear at all.
Scott Wang	Zhou Qiang	Nicknamed as 'Qiang'; Known as Chef Qiang; Husband of Li Yafang; Head Chef of the Japanese Restaurant Otsu-mi-ya; Son of Zhou Yong	He appeared in episodes 32-286.
Joanne Lian	Li Yafang	Daughter of Li Shunxing and Cai Qiumin; Once had a crush on Shengjie; Later married to Zhou Qiang	She appeared in all the episodes
Elsie Ye	Zhou Jiayu	Younger sister of Zhou Qiang; Cheerful personality Girlfriend of Yang Zhiyuan	She appeared in episodes 42-214. After a bidding competition with Yang Zhiyuan, they became a pair of quarrelsome lovers.

=== Lis (Chang Shun Tea House) ===
Cast	Role	Character / Relationship / Career	Episodes appeared / Status
Wang Hao	Li Shunxing	Boss of Chang Shun Tea House; Sworn brother of Chen Wanzong	He appeared in all the episodes.
Lin Peijun	Cai Qiumin	Lady boss of Chang Shun Tea House; Shrewd, plan carefully and a little petty Friends of Lin Xiuhong and Yang Huimei	She appeared in all the episodes.
He Yidong	Li Jintang	Son of Li Shunxing and Cai Qiumin; Sticks with Chen Shengchang; Boyfriend of Sun Qiaoqiao	He appeared in all the episodes.

=== Hongs (Jiu Long House Cuisine Group) ===
Cast	Role	Character / Relationship / Career	Episodes appeared / Status
Pang Xianglin	Hong Kunlong	Also known as 'Managing Director Hong'; Triad leader Dotes on Xiaolin; Holds Jiu Long House Cuisine Group	He appeared in all the episodes.
Wang Zhonghuang	Lai Jinfa	Known as Chef Jinfa; Counsin of Hong Kunlong; Head Chef of Jiu Long House	He appeared in all the episodes.

=== Zhaos ===
Cast	Role	Character / Relationship / Career	Episodes appeared / Status
Jiang Guobin	Zhao Dachuan	Nicknamed 'Asthmatic Chuan'; Police officer Elder brother of Zhao Wuzhong; Later helped Wanzong's family Later fell in love with Wang Ting	He appeared in all the episodes.
Yang Shiwei	Zhao Wuzhong	One of Hong Kunlong's men Younger brother of Zhao Dachuan; Paralysed by Chen Shengchang	He appeared in episodes 1-55.

=== Yangs (Yang Guang Rice) ===
Cast	Role	Character / Relationship / Career	Episodes appeared / Status
Li Tao	Yang Tiansong	Husband of Zhang Suru; Elder brother of Yang Huimei; Boss of Yang Guang Rice; Father of Yang Zhiyuan	He appeared in episodes 116-214 and later episodes 222-240.
Chen Yi	Zhang Suru	Wife of Tiansong; Ex-wife of Liao Jinsheng; Stepmother of Yang Zhiyuan	She appeared in episodes 116-214 and later episodes 222-240.
Yi Zheng	Yang Zhiyuan	Son of Tiansong; Disciple of Sato; Boyfriend of Zhou Jiayu	He appeared in episodes 127-214.

=== Domotos (Domoto Fisheries) ===
Domoto (Japanese: 堂本; Romaji: Dōmoto) is a Japanese surname. Japanese surnames are in Chinese characters or Kanji due to Sinicization in Japan. In Mandarin, the surname is pronounced as Tángběn. All "Japanese" in this drama were in fact acted by Taiwanese actors.

Cast	Role	Character / Relationship / Career	Episodes appeared / Status
Fan Hung-hsuan	Tetsuya Domoto	Disciple of Wang Yixiong; Father of Ryusuke Domoto and Norika Domoto	He appeared in episodes 228-286.
Jiang Hong-En	Ryusuke Domoto	Elder brother of Norika; The Japanese Huiwen met coincidentally when she lost her memory Superior of Yang Zhiyuan; Son of Tetsuya Domoto; Had a crush on Wang-wang/Huiwen but gave up knowing she was the fiancee of Shengjie	He appeared in episodes 159-187, and later episodes 250-286.
Lee Yan	Norika Domoto	Younger sister of Ryusuke; Daughter of Tetsuya; Has a troll personality Known as the Troll Duo together with Shengfen; Had a crush on Yang Zhiyuan	She appeared in episodes 161-286.

=== Wangs (Chuang Shi Ji Group) ===
Cast	Role	Character / Relationship / Career	Episodes appeared / Status
Xu Jiarong	Wang Yixiong	Cuisine King; Master of Wang Ting, Gao Shoushan, Luo Ping and Tetsuya Domoto; Founder of Chuang Shi Ji Group; Jealous of Liu Mingfeng who married Jingyue	He appeared in episodes 241-286. He killed himself in episode 286 by jumping into the sea.
Vivi Chen	Tian Ying	Younger sister of Wang Yixiong; Later died of illness	She appeared in episodes 276-286.

=== Luos (Wagyu business) ===
Cast	Role	Character / Relationship / Career	Episodes appeared / Status
Kang Ting	Luo Guoqing	Known as 'Uncle Corner Shrimp'; Father of Luo Ping	He appeared in episodes 210-286.
On Xuebin	Luo Ping	Nicknamed as 'Ping'; Boss of the Wagyu business Disciple of Wang Yixiong; Godfather and senior of Wang Ting; Previously framed by Hong Kunlong	He appeared in episodes 205-286.

=== Gaos (Sushi expert) ===
Cast	Role	Character / Relationship / Career	Episodes appeared / Status
Qiu Naihua	Gao Baozu (Zu)	Nicknamed as 'Zu'; Mother of Shoushan	She appeared in episodes 205-207.
Charge Hsueh-liang Pu	Gao Shoushan (Gao Ye)	Sushi expert Son of Gao Baozu; Disciple of Wang Yixiong; Senior of Wang Ting	He appeared in episodes 200-286.

=== Zhangs (First Hotel) ===
Cast	Role	Character / Relationship / Career	Episodes appeared / Status
No cast	Zhang Tianfu	Great-grandfather of Zhang Xiaoping; Grandfather of Zhang Mingquan; Master of the Top Five Chef	He did not appear at all.
Jeannie Hsieh	Zhang Xiaoping	Executive Chef of First Hotel; Great-granddaughter of Zhang Tianfu	She appeared in episodes 250-286.
Ma Ju-feng	Zhang Mingquan	Boss of First Hotel; Prison officer during Wang Yixiong's imprisonment Uncle of Zhang Xiaoping	He appeared in episodes 241-286.

=== Others ===
Cast	Role	Character / Relationship / Career	Episodes appeared / Status
Chen Liqin	Sun Qiaoqiao	Assistant and friend of Chen Huiwen; Girlfriend of Li Jintang	She appeared in all the episodes.
Huang Yuxin	Sakurako	Friend and personal bodyguard of Wang Ting	She appeared in episodes 215-286. She was mistaken as the daughter of Liu Chongren and his wife. Wang Yixiong didn't want to reveal Wang Ting's identity as their daughter. Thus he switched their hairs. She was later adopted as their goddaughter.
Yang Shaowen	Wu Jianhong	Assistant of Tai Mei Enterprise; Assists Yonghe to seize the company	He appeared in episodes 1-240.
Huang Youxi	Huang Siwen	One of Hong Kunlong's men	He appeared in episodes 1-55.
Gao Mingwei	Uncle Fu	In charge of Hong Kunlong's owned illegal gambling house	He appeared in only episode 26.
Yan Weili	Wu Zhongyi	Police officer Subordinate of Dachuan	He appeared in episodes 32-240.
Yang Lie	Koichi Sato	Gourmet who awarded Otsu-mi-ya three-star rating Friend of Zhou Yong	He appeared in episodes 48-55.
Xu Cuixue	Xiao-xia	Manager of Chef Wan's Beef Noodles	She appeared in episodes 180-240.
Lin Yicheng	Xiao-wei	Younger brother of Xiao-xia	He appeared in episodes 127-138.
Li Fei	Ken	Ken; Personal assistant of Ryusuke	He appeared in episodes 161-199.
Liang Younan	Ye Jinfeng	Nicknamed as 'Feng'; Known as 'Auntie Feng'; Once had a crush on Wanzong; Left after being misunderstood by Wanzong; Ex-wife of Tetsuya Domoto; later divorced	She appeared in episodes 182-286.
Zhang Hong	Peipei	Likes Zhiyuan; Originally assistant of Jinfeng; Actually the biological daughter of Ye Jinfeng born in Japan; Identity later revealed Father unknown	She appeared in episodes 182-221.
Si Fang	A-bu-la	An assistant of Luo Ping on the surface In actuality, sent by Wang Yixiong to monitor Luoping's men in the Wagyu business	He appeared in episodes 215-221.
Chen Guoqing	Xiao-chen	One of Wang Yixiong's men	He appeared in episodes 241-285.
You Yaoguang	Yang Jiawen	Requires wild black eel as a supplement for Yuhua; Got involved with Liu Shengjie due to this	He appeared in episodes 262-273.
Lin Yuqing	Yuhua	Wife of Jiawen; Final-stage cancer patient	She appeared in episodes 262-273.
You Shun'an	Shun	Childhood friend of Tian Ying; Likes Tian Ying	He appeared in episodes 281-286.

=== Taiwan broadcast ===
As of June 2011, the show airs in Taiwan, country of origin of the drama every weeknight at prime time (20:00) with episodes which have ranged in length from 135 to 150 minutes including commercial advertisements. The producers received funding from the Government Information Office to produce the series in high definition.

== International broadcast ==
=== Singapore ===
Due to local broadcast laws prohibiting radio or television broadcasts in Chinese dialects the show was dubbed into Mandarin when it aired on MediaCorp Channel 8 thus making it the first channel to broadcast the show in Mandarin. It was the third Taiwan drama to broadcast the show in Singapore.

=== Vietnam ===
The Vietnamese dub "Thiên hạ đệ nhất vị" was broadcast on Vinh Long Television Station Channel (THVL) (Vietnamese: Truyền Hình Vĩnh Long) and is streamable on YouTube. The show was aired on Vietface TV from 1pm-2:30pm (PT), however, it was fully aired as it was replaced with Ghar Ki Lakshmi Betiyann. The show is also currently airing on E Channel.

=== Malaysia ===
The drama is broadcasting now in 8TV in original Hokkien language under the English title Unique Flavor for two episodes with one hour each from Monday to Friday, at 11:30 MST and 14:00 MST with a 30 minutes break of its Midday Mandarin News at 12:30 MST.
