= Love Above All =

Taiwanese television series

- Chinese: 真情滿天下
- Hokkien POJ: Chin-chêng Boán Thian-hā
- Genre: Family; Romance
- Directed by: Feng Kai
- Country of origin: Taiwan
- Original language: Hokkien
- No. of episodes: 311

Production
- Running time: 120-150 minutes

Original release
- Network: SET Taiwan

Love Above All (Chinese: 真情滿天下; Pe̍h-ōe-jī: Chin-chêng Boán Thian-hā), also known as Pay It Forward, is a Taiwanese Hokkien television series that airs on Sanlih E-Television in Taiwan .

== Local broadcast ==
The show airs every weeknight at the prime time slot (20:00) with episodes ranging in length from 135 to 150 minutes including commercial advertisements. The producers received funding from the Government Information Office to produce the series in high definition.

== International broadcast ==
=== Vietnam broadcast ===
The Vietnamese dub "Doi Song Cho Dem" was broadcast on Vinh Long Television Station Channel (THVL) (Vietnamese: Truyền Hình Vĩnh Long) and is streamable on YouTube. The show was aired on Vietface TV from 1pm-2:30pm (PT), however, it was fully aired as it was replaced with Ghar Ki Lakshmi Betiyann. The show is also currently airing on E Channel.

=== Malaysia broadcast ===
The drama was broadcast on 8TV in original Hokkien language under the English title Pay It Forward for two episodes with one hour each from Monday to Friday, at 11:30 MST and 13:00 MST with a 30 minutes break of its Midday Mandarin News at 12:30 MST.

=== Singapore broadcast ===
Due to local broadcast laws prohibiting radio or television broadcasts in Chinese dialects, the show was dubbed into Mandarin when it aired on Singapore's MediaCorp Channel 8, thus making it the first channel to broadcast the show in Mandarin.
