= Lee's Family Reunion =

2010–2011 Taiwanese Hokkien television series

- Chinese: 家和萬事興
- Hokkien POJ: Ka-hô Bān-sū Heng
- Genre: Drama
- Directed by: Liu Jianlü; Wu Meng'en (zh); Chen Junren; Yu Weide; Lian Chunli
- Country of origin: Taiwan
- Original language: Hokkien
- No. of episodes: 275 (original run); 720 (overseas version)

Production
- Running time: 120–150 minutes

Original release
- Network: SET Taiwan
- Release: 11 October 2010 – 30 November 2011

Lee's Family Reunion (Chinese: 家和萬事興; pinyin: Jiā Hé Wànshì Xīng; Pe̍h-ōe-jī: Ka Hô Bān-sū Heng) is a Taiwanese Hokkien television series which aired on Sanlih E-Television in Taiwan. It was originally broadcast in Taiwan for 275 episodes from 2010 to 2011, and later ran internationally.

The producers received funding from the Government Information Office to produce this series in high definition.

== Cast ==
=== Main ===
Cast	Character	Description
Angus Hsieh	Xiao Hansheng né Lin Hansheng	▪Husband of Li Zhengnan ▪Half younger brother of Gao Tiancheng and Jiang Anan (Jiang Xiaocao) ▪Older brother of Lin Aiting ▪Xiao Hongshuai and Qiu Jinlan's son ▪Xiao Yutang's father ▪Jiang Jiahao's biological paternal uncle ▪Fang Xiaowen's ex-husband ▪Xia Yongzhen's younger half brother-in-law ▪Lin Jianhua's older brother-in-law ▪Luo Xiuqin's son-in-law ▪Li Zaichuan and Yang Bihua's foster son-in-law
Angel Han	Chen Zhengnan née Li Zhengnan (Chen Yijing 陈怡静)	▪Wife of Xiao Hansheng ▪Younger sister of Chen Jiabao and Chen Jiawang ▪Luo Xiuqin's biological daughter ▪Li Zaichuan and Yang Bihua's foster daughter ▪Xiao Yutang's mother ▪Li Zaixing and Li Shufen's foster niece ▪Li Wanshi and Wanghao's foster granddaughter ▪Jiang Anan (Jiang Xiaocao) and Gao Tiancheng's younger half sister-in-law ▪Lin Aiting's older sister-in-law ▪Li Wenxing's foster older cousin ▪Xiao Hongshuai and Qiu Jinlan's daughter-in-law ▪Li Huixin's foster older sister ▪Ex-fiancé of Gao Tiancheng and David Xu Jian'an
Joanne Lien	Chen Zhengnan née Li Zhengnan (Chen Yijing 陈怡静)	
Eric Huang	Xiao Tiancheng né Gao Tiancheng	▪Husband of Xia Yongzhen ▪Ex-husband of Li Huixin and Fang Xiaofei ▪Gao Mingquan's foster son ▪Gao Yuping's foster younger brother ▪Li Zaichuan and Yang Bihua's ex-son-in-law ▪Li Wanshi and Wanghao's ex-grandson-in-law ▪Li Zaixing and Li Shufen's ex-nephew-in-law ▪Ex-fiancé of Li Zhengnan ▪Jiang Jiahao's biological father ▪Xiao Yutang's biological paternal uncle ▪Xiao Hongshuai and Cai Yuexiang's (Liu Qiuxia) son ▪Half older brother of Xiao Hansheng and Lin Aiting ▪Li Zhengnan and Lin Jianhua's older half brother-in-law
Phoenix Chang	Xia Yongzhen	▪Wife of Gao Tiancheng ▪Jiang Jiahao and Jiang Jiatong's mother ▪Jiang Letian's ex-wife ▪Jiang Yong's ex-daughter-in-law ▪Jiang Anan's (Jiang Xiaocao) half older ex-sister-in-law ▪Xiao Hansheng and Lin Aiting's half older sister-in-law ▪Jiang Minmin's foster older sister-in-law. ▪Xiao Hongshuai and Cai Yuexiang's daughter-in-law
June Tsai	Li Huixin née Li Wenfang	▪Li Zaichuan and Yang Bihua's biological daughter ▪Ex-wife of Gao Tiancheng ▪Li Xiaoxing's aunt ▪Li Wenxing's biological older cousin ▪Li Zaixing and Li Shufen's biological niece ▪Li Wanshi's and Wanghao's biological granddaughter ▪Chen Jiabao and Li Zhengnan's foster younger sister ▪Luo Xiuqin's foster daughter. ▪Gao Yuping's foster younger ex-sister-in-law ▪Xiao Hansheng and Lin Aiting's older half ex-sister-in-law ▪Gao Mingquan's foster ex-daughter-in-law ▪Xiao Hongshuai and Cai Yuexiang's (Liu Qiuxia) ex-daughter-in-law
Norman Chen	Fang Xiaozu (Fang Xiaozhu 方小祖)	▪Chen Jiabao's alias ▪"Son" of Fang Heilong ▪Older brother of Fang Xiaowen and Fang Xiaofei ▪Fang Baobao and Fang Baobei's father ▪Lin Shuibo's grandson-in-law ▪Lin Hongshan's nephew-in-law ▪Du Feihu's older brother-in-law
Norman Chen	Chen Jiabao (Ah Hai 阿海)	▪Luo Xiuqin's youngest son ▪Older brother of Li Zhengnan and younger brother of Chen Jiawang ▪Li Huixin's foster older brother ▪Xiao Yutang's biological uncle ▪Fang Xiaofei's boyfriend ▪Lin Ailin's ex-boyfriend
Carolyn Chen	Lin Ailin (Irene)	▪Wife of Fang Xiaozu ▪Du Feihu's biological older sister ▪Lin Hongshan's niece ▪Lin Shuibo's granddaughter ▪Fang Baobao and Fang Baobei's mother ▪Fang Heilong's daughter-in-law ▪Chen Jiabao's ex-girlfriend ▪Lin Jianhua's biological younger cousin
Ehlo Huang	Li Wenxing né Liao Wenxing (Eric 艾力克)	▪Husband of Fang Xiaowen ▪Father of Li Xiaoxing ▪Li Wanshi's grandson ▪Wanghao's foster grandson ▪Li Zaichuan and Li Shufen's nephew ▪Li Huixin's biological younger cousin ▪Li Zaixing and Chen Liyun's son ▪Lin Aiting's ex-husband ▪Fang Heilong's son-in-law
Sunny Li	Fang Xiaowen（Darling Xiaowen 小雯宝贝）	▪Older sister of Fang Xiaofei and younger sister of Fang Xiaozu ▪Fang Heilong's oldest daughter ▪Wife of Li Wenxing ▪Xiao Yutang's foster mother ▪Mother of Li Xiaoxing ▪Xiao Hansheng's ex-wife ▪Li Zaixing and Chen Liyun's daughter-in-law
Ting Kuo-lin	Qiu Jinlan 邱金烂(Big mum 邱大妈)金烂哥	▪Lin Jianhua and Li Zhengnan's mother-in-law ▪Jiang Yong's ex-girlfriend ▪Xiao Hongshuai and Lin Hongshan's ex-wife ▪Xiao Yutang's paternal grandmother ▪Mother of Xiao Hansheng, Lin Aiting and Jiang Anan (Jiang Xiaocao)
Hsing Hui	Ye Yimei (Officer Ye 葉组长）	▪Lin Hongshan's wife ▪Tong Guan's daughter ▪Lin Shuibo's niece-in-law ▪Lin Jianhua's foster mother
Miao Ke-li	Chen Liyun (Maria 玛丽亚)	▪Li Wenxing's mother ▪Li Zaixing's wife ▪Li Wanshi's daughter-in-law ▪Wanghao's foster daughter-in-law ▪Li Zaichuan and Li Shufen's sister-in-law ▪Fang Xiaowen's mother-in-law ▪Li Xiaoxing's paternal grandmother ▪Lin Aiting's ex-mother-in-law
Franco Chiang	Lin Hongshan（Shan-he 山哥）	▪Lin Jianhua's biological father ▪Lin Shuibo's nephew ▪Ye Yimei's husband ▪Lin Aiting's foster father and father-in-law ▪Lin Ailin and Lin Feihu's paternal uncle ▪Fang Xiaozu and Jiang Anan (Jiang Xiaocao) 's uncle-in-law ▪Qiu Jinlan's ex-husband ▪Ding Meiqi (Maggie) 's ex-boyfriend

== Soundtrack ==
Music

=== 片頭曲 ===
1. 惦在你身邊（2013年10月31日−2013年10月31日）
  主唱：黃乙玲，作詞：彭立，作曲：彭立
2. 永遠再會（2013年11月1日−2013年11月29日）
  主唱：邵大倫，作詞：許明傑，作曲：許明傑
3. 望天草（2013年12月2日−2013年12月31日）
  主唱：張秀卿，作詞：張燕清，作曲：張燕清
4. 說得到做不到（2014年1月1日−2014年1月31日）
  主唱：甲子慧，作詞：郭之儀，作曲：郭之儀
5. 雨傘代表阮心肝（2014年2月3日−2014年2月18日）
  主唱：李翊君，作詞：高以德，作曲：黃明洲
6. 無聲（2014年2月19日−2014年2月28日）
  主唱：李翊君，作詞：吳梵，作曲：吳梵
7. 阿郎行船曲（2014年3月3日−2014年3月31日）
  主唱：楊哲，詞曲：竹間也
8. 阿母（2014年4月1日−2014年4月30日）
  主唱：沈建豪，詞曲：陳偉強
9. 爸爸請你也保重（2014年5月1日−2014年5月30日）
  主唱：Chris Hung，作詞：董家銘，作曲：高樂榮
10. 愛著妳（2014年6月2日−2014年6月30日）
  主唱：吳俊宏、向蕙玲，作詞：石國人，作曲：石國人
11. 請你相信我的愛（2014年7月1日−2014年7月31日）
  主唱：林國慶、董育君，作詞：林國慶，作曲：林國慶
12. 心頭石（2014年8月1日−2014年8月29日）
  主唱：邱芸子，作詞：高以德，作曲：林文德
13. 為愛相逢（2014年9月1日−2014年9月30日）
  主唱：林良歡、翁立友，作詞：石國人，作曲：石國人
14. 兄弟（2014年10月1日−2014年10月31日）
  主唱：陳茂豐，作詞：李友雄，作曲：李友雄
15. 青春的夢（2014年11月3日−2014年11月28日）
  主唱：秀蘭瑪雅，作詞：鄭喬安，作曲：鄭喬安
16. 阮的幸福（2014年12月1日−2014年12月31日）
  主唱：陳淑萍，作詞：石國人，作曲：石國人
17. 手中花（2015年1月1日−2015年1月30日）
  主唱：孫淑媚，作詞：球球，作曲：孫淑媚
18. 英雄好漢（2015年2月2日−2015年2月27日）
  主唱：余天龍、陳四皆，作詞：余天龍，作曲：余天龍
19. 思念的夢（2015年3月2日−2015年3月31日）
  主唱：喬幼，作詞：石國人，作曲：石國人
20. 癡情過重（2015年4月1日−2015年4月30日）
  主唱：甲子慧，作詞：林東松，作曲：林東松
21. 真情夢（2015年5月1日−2015年5月29日）
  主唱：洪榮宏，作詞：何賀田，作曲：何賀田
22. 八字命（2015年6月1日−2015年6月30日）
  主唱：莊振凱，作詞：石國人，作曲：石國人
23. 望月話相思（2015年7月1日−2015年7月3日）
  主唱：鄭君威、王秀琪，作詞：張明達，作曲：小葉
24. 三生緣（2015年7月6日−2015年7月27日）
  主唱：方瑞娥，作詞：志峰，作曲：志峰
25. 唯一的愛（2015年7月28日-2015年7月31日）
  主唱：Tsai Hsiao-hu、董育君，作詞：張錦華，作曲：張錦華
26. 你是我的玫瑰（2015年8月3日-2015年8月31日）
  主唱：葉諾帆，作詞：林文德，作曲：林文德
27. 紅豆（2015年9月1日-2015年9月30日）
  主唱：謝宜君，作詞：石國人，作曲：石國人
28. 我有情你有意（2015年10月1日-2015年10月30日）
  主唱：吳木、尤姿涵，作詞：李岩修，作曲：徐嘉良
29. 愛越深心越寒（2015年11月2日-2015年11月30日）
  主唱：謝莉婷，作詞：蔡宜汝，作曲：蔡宜汝
30. 甲妳惜命命（2015年12月1日-2015年12月31日）
  主唱：翁立友、謝金晶，作詞：石國人，作曲：石國人
31. 團圓（2016年1月1日-2016年1月29日）
  主唱：孫淑媚，作詞：鄭丞杰，作曲：鄭丞杰
32. 相思話（2016年2月1日-2016年2月29日）
  主唱：陳淑萍，作詞：王宗凱、張蕙貞，作曲：王宗凱
33. 夢你夢到醒（2016年3月1日-2016年3月2日）
  主唱：洪榮宏，作詞：陳宏銘，作曲：陳宏銘
34. 愛你到永遠（2016年3月3日-2016年3月31日）
  主唱：洪榮宏，作詞：許明傑，作曲：田中郎
35. 夢中的蝴蝶（2016年4月1日-2016年4月29日）
  主唱：江志豐、吳申梅，作詞：江志豐，作曲：江志豐
36. 一夜香（2016年5月2日-2016年5月31日）
  主唱：徐紫淇，作詞：張燕清，作曲：張燕清
37. 孤鸞命（2016年6月1日-2016年6月30日）
  主唱：陳百潭、鳳娘，作詞：陳百潭，作曲：陳百潭
38. 感謝有你（2016年7月1日-2016年7月29日）
  主唱：謝莉婷，作詞：高以德，作曲：陳文靛
39. 手中戲（2016年8月1日-2016年8月3日）
  主唱：莊振凱，作詞：張道寬、王宗凱，作曲：王宗凱

== International broadcast ==
=== Malaysia broadcast ===
The drama was broadcast on 8TV in original Hokkien language under the English title Lee's Family Reunion from Monday to Friday, at 18:00 MST starting 2012.

=== Singapore broadcast ===
Due to local broadcast laws prohibiting radio or television broadcasts in Chinese dialects, the show was dubbed into Mandarin when it aired on Singapore's MediaCorp Channel 8, thus making it the first channel to broadcast the show in Mandarin.

The show aired on Mediacorp Channel 8 on Saturdays from 7 to 9:00 pm and from 7 to 10:00 pm on Sundays with English and Chinese subtitles and ended its run on 19 May 2018.

==== Repeat Telecast (2019) ====
The drama succeeded the 10.30 am – 12.30 pm timeslot from Monday to Thursday (Except on Fridays due to The Butterfly Chalice at 10.30pm and E Getai at 11.30pm) on Mediacorp Channel 8 with Chinese subtitles and it ended its repeat telecast on 8 June 2021.
