= Strokes of Life =

- Traditional Chinese: 金枝玉葉
- Simplified Chinese: 金枝玉叶
- Hanyu Pinyin: Jīn Zhī Yù Yè
- Hokkien POJ: Kim-ki-gio̍k-hio̍h
- Starring: Ye Huan; Lin Wei; Wang Mei Jun; Chen Guang
- Opening theme: Jin Zhi Yu Ye by Ye Huan; Lin Wei; Wang Mei Jun; Chen Guang
- Ending theme: Generation Girl, Lie by Ye Huan
- Country of origin: Taiwan
- Original language: Hokkien
- No. of episodes: 94

Production
- Running time: 60 minutes (approx.)

Original release
- Network: ntv7 (Malaysia)
- Release: 30 December 2009

Strokes of Life (Chinese: 金枝玉葉; Pe̍h-ōe-jī: Kim-ki-gio̍k-hio̍h; lit. 'Golden Branch Jade Leaf') is a costume Hokkien drama set in 1917, then 1940. It was produced by Formosa Television in Taiwan and was broadcast in 2001. It starred Ye Huan, Lin Wei, Wang Mei Jun and Chen Guang.

== Plot ==
=== Season 1 ===
Two brides, Yu Ye (Ye Huan) and Jin Feng (Mei Jun) met each other while on their way to their future husband. According to the costume, two brides meeting each other on their wedding day will bring bad luck. Thus, Yu Ye and Jin Feng wish each other a good marriage ahead. When Yu Ye reached her husband's house, Jin Feng was there also. Meanwhile, Shi Hua (Lin Wei) had no idea that he will have a double wedding that day.

=== Season 2 ===
Season 2 remarks the appearance of Qiong Mei (played by Ye Huan), Yu Ye's twin sister. She came to Taiwan as a Japanese woman with her fiancée, Zheng Chuan. It was discovered that she had lost her memory when Zheng Guang attacked Yong Hui.

=== Season 3 ===
Season 3 remarks the aftermath of Qiong Mei's suicide and the rising Of Wang Ying Tai.

=== Season 4 ===
23 years later, in 1940. Jin Feng is mentally unstable. She hates Ming Feng (her son with Ying Tai) but focused all her motherly love to Jia Sheng.

== Cast ==
=== Main characters ===
==== Original ====
Actor	Character	Earlier Plot	Later Plot
Ye Huan	Hong Yu Ye	Protagonist, Shi Hua's second wife	lost her daughter when Ying Tai sets fire on her house, went to other town with Yong hui to visit her mother
Lin Wei	Lin Shi Hua	Protagonist, Husband of Jin Feng & Yu Ye	shot by Ying Tai, sent to Malaysia
Wang Mei Jun	Wu Jin Feng	Shi Hua's first wife, Yu Ye's step sister, hates Yu Ye, later reconciles with Yu Ye during Lin family's destroyal	rapped by Ying tai while asking about Shi Hua, 23 years later, has mental problem, hates her son (Ming Feng) of Ying Tai's seed
Chen Guang	Xie Yong Hui	Qiong Mei's fiancée	Brings Yu Ye to live with Cai Lian in other town

=== Secondary characters ===
==== Reprising characters ====
	Character(s)	Descriptions
	Wang Ying Tai	Antagonist, obsessed with Jin Feng, destroyed Lin family.
	Qiu Yue	Jin Feng's maid, wants to be Shi Hua's third wife
	Hong Cai Lian	Mother of Yu Ye and Qiong Mei.
	Huang Xiu Duan	owner of Xiu Duan Feng, saved Yu Ye' s life, helped Yu Ye a lot
	Guo Tuo Dong	a trader from China, helps Cai Lian and Yu Ye often, later helps Xiu Duan at her restaurant
	Wu Jian Tang	Father of Jin Feng, Qiong Mei and Yu Ye, Cai Lian's ex-husband
Kao Shin Shin	Lin Li Hua	Shi Hua's elder sister
	Jin Shu	Helper of Lin's family
Song Yimin	Ah Guo	Xiu Duan's ex-fiancée, left Xiu Duan on their wedding day, father of Tian Shui
	Mrs. Lin	Mother of Li Hua and Shi Hua
	Liao Chun Sheng	villain in earlier episodes, cheats Li Hua's money, changed later after the death of his wife, helped Lin family but killed by Wang Ying Tai
	Mrs. Wu	Mother of Jin Feng, Jian Tang's first wife

==== New generation characters ====
Appeared in Season 4

Actor	Character(s)	Descriptions
Huang Wei De	Lin Jia Sheng	In love with Shu Jun, Believed himself as the child of Jin Feng and Shi Hua although his biological parents are Qiu Yue and Ying Tai, hated by Ying Tai and Ming Feng as Jin Feng only cares about him
	Chen Shu Jun	In love with Jia Sheng, came to the city to find her real parents with the jade
Liao	Huang Tian Shui	Xiu Duan's son, likes Siu
Linjian Hua	Wang Ming Feng	In love with Shu jun, hates Jia Sheng (his half brother)
Han Yu	Li Ling	daughter of a wealthy merchant, dying, likes Jia Sheng, forced to marry Ming Feng
Chen Xianmei	Mei Lan	escaped from her marriage proposed by her father, likes Ming Feng

=== Tertiary characters ===
==== Special characters ====
Appeared in Season 2

Actor	Character(s)	Descriptions
	Chen Zheng Guang	Yong hui's ex-best friend, hates Yong Hui because he thought Yong Hui didn't protect his mother, later gave his company to Chun Sheng
Ye Huan	Qiong Mei (Fu Mei Zi)	Yong Hui's fiancée, Yu Ye's twin sister, Jin Feng's step sister, Cai Lian's daughter, (lost memory: Fu Mei Zi, used by Zheng Chuang to revenge against Yong Hui, rebellion, disguised as Yu Ye to give Jin Feng lessons), committed suicide but her body is missing

== Theme songs ==
=== Opening theme ===
Also used as post-commercial eye catch throughout the series
Song: "Jin Zhi Yu Ye"
Singers: Ye Huan, Lin Wei, Wang Mei Jun, Chen Guang
Language: Hokkien
Trivia: Voices appearances

- Verse 1
  - Part 1-2: Ye Huan
  - Line 3-4: Lin Wei
  - Line 5-6: Wang Mei Jun
  - Line 7-8: Chen Guang
- Chorus
  - Parts 1 & 2: Ye Huan & Mei Jun
  - Parts 3 & 4: Lin Wei & Chen Guang
  - Parts 5: Ye Huan & Mei Jun
  - Parts 6: Lin Wei & Chen Guang
- Verse 2
  - Line 1-2: Ye Huan
  - Line 3-4: Chen Guang

=== Ending theme (Season 1) ===
Also used as pre-commercial eye catch throughout the series
Song: "Generation of Beautiful Woman"
Singer: Ye Huan
Language: Mandarin

=== Ending theme (Seasons 2 - 4) ===
Song: "Lie"
Singer: Ye Huan
Language: Hokkien
