= List of programmes broadcast by 8TV (Malaysian TV network) =

This is a list of television programmes broadcast by 8TV either currently broadcast or formerly broadcast on 8TV in Malaysia.

== Asian Hour (Chinese drama series) ==
These are local drama and international drama series (mainly from China and Singapore studios and production) which broadcast on Weekdays from 6:00 pm to 7:00 pm.

2018

- The Legendary Tycoon (15 March) (Drama suspended on 9 May 2018 due to special report on developments about Malaysia General Election)
- I Am Not an Elite (15 May) (Drama repeated on 21 October 2020, Wednesday 11:00 pm to Thursday 12:30 am and Thursday 11:00 pm to Friday 12:30 am)
- City Still Believe In Love (11 July) (previously broadcast on NTV7, broadcast by the channel as part of its new programme lineup)
- When Duty Calls / When Duty Calls (11 September)
- Sweet Combat / Sweet Combat (9 October) (Episode 1 until 12 broadcast from Monday to Thursday 9:30 pm to 10:30 pm, Timeslot on episode 13 onwards, Weekdays 6:00 pm to 7:00 pm)
- My Teacher Is a Thug / My Teacher Is A Thug (13 November)
- The Grainfield (18 December)

== Asian Programmes ==
These programmes broadcast in various timeslots, depending on the programmes type. These programmes are mainly from China, Hong Kong, South Korea includes Best of Korea Hanbok (broadcast on Thursdays and Fridays in 2015), Singapore, Hito Theatre segment, Taiwan, and Japan.

- 1 Litre no Namida
- 100% Senorita
- 2020 JSBC Countdown Concert (29 December 2020 to 1 January 2021) (Tuesday to Friday 12:30 am to 1:30 am) (Reality Television)
- 2021 Taichung Happy New Year (12 February 2021) (Friday 1:00 pm to 3:00 pm) (Reality Television)
- 2021 JSBC Spring Festival Gala (20 February 2021) (Saturday 5:00 pm to 7:00 pm) (Reality Television)
- 2022 JSBC Countdown Concert (2 February 2022 to 4 February 2022) (Wednesday 11:00 pm to Thursday 1:30 am), (Thursday 11:00 pm to Friday 1:00 am) (Reality Television)
- 2022 JSBC Spring Festival Gala (2 February 2022) (Wednesday 5:00 pm to 7:00 pm) (Reality Television)
- 2022 Happy Chinese New Year (4 February 2022 to 7 February 2022) (Friday 9:30 am to Monday 10:30 am) (Reality Television)
- A Date With Mei Feng 2022 CNY Special (1 February 2022 to 4 February 2022) (Tuesday 1:00 pm to Friday 1:30 pm) (Reality Television)
- Absolutely Charming
- Amazing World
- Amazing Magician
- Assassination Classroom (Taiwanese Mandarin dub)
- Atashinchi (Taiwanese Mandarin dub)
- Bakuman (Taiwanese Mandarin dub)
- Battle of Voices
- Beauty of China III
- Blessings / Blessings
- Bewitched in Tokyo
- Beyond Show (China Talent Show) (Repeated on 23 October 2021, Saturday 11:00 pm to Sunday 12:30 am) (Reality Television - Talent Search Competition Show)
- The Birth of Performer (Reality Television - Acting Talent Search Competition Show)
- A Bite of China
- Blue Exorcist: Kyoto Saga (Taiwanese Mandarin dub)
- Body SOS (previous seasons from NTV7)
  - Body SOS Season 9 (13 November 2021) (Saturday 6:30 pm to 7:00 pm) (Reality Television)
- The Brain (previous seasons from NTV7)
- Buzzer Beat
- C.L.I.F.
- Canton Flavor (Season 6) (27 March 2022) (Sunday 9:00 pm to 10:00 pm) (Reality Television)
- Chef Nic
- Chibi Maruko Chan (Taiwanese Mandarin dub)
- China Exploration
- China Idioms Competition
- China Mega Projects
- China Star
- Chinese Paladin
- Chinese Hero Zhao Zi Long
- Chuan Mei Tou Shi
- Code Blue
- Corner with Love
- Cruel Romance
- Culture Japan
- A Date with Luyu
- Destined Love
- Detective Conan (Taiwanese Mandarin dub)
- Ding Ge Long Dong Qiang
- Discover The Silk Road II
- Doctor
- Don't Worry Be Happy
- Double Happiness
- The Dream Catchers
- The Dream Makers (repeat of NTV7 programme)
- A Dream Named Desire
- Dream of China
- Divorce Lawyers (repeat of NTV7 programme)
- Eight Heroes
- The Enchanted
- Eureka Moment China
- Fairy Tail (Taiwanese Mandarin dub)
- Family Humour Contest
- Feel The World (1 April 2022) (Friday 9:30 pm to 10:30 pm) (Reality Television - Travel Show)
- Feng Shu's Cooking Class
- Flowers of Reluctance
- Foods in life
- Full Throttle Girl
- Garo
- Ghost Catcher Zhong Kui (24 June 2021) (Weekdays 9:30 am to 10:30 am) (Drama repeated on 16 September 2021) (Wednesday 11:00 pm to Thursday 12:30 am and Thursday 11:00 pm to Friday 12:30 am) (Taiwanese Mandarin dub) (1995-1996 Taiwan version)
- Go Fighting! / Go Fighting! 2020 (26 September 2020) (Saturday 9:00 pm to 11:00 pm) (Multiple Seasons - Season 1 from 2 January 2016, Season 2 from 8 October 2016, Season 3 from 4 November 2017, Season 6 from 26 September 2020) (Season 6 - Repeat broadcast on 17 May 2021, Monday 12:00 am to 1:30 am) (Season 6 repeat broadcast - Timeslot on 6 June onwards, Sunday 10:30 pm to Monday 12:00 am) (Reality Television)
- Go Fighting! Treasure Tour Season 2 (28 August 2021) Saturday 9:30 pm to 11:30 pm) (Reality Television) (Repeat broadcast on 7 March 2022, Monday 12:00 am to 2:00 am)
- Ge Tai Sing Competition
- Genius Go Go Go / Genius Go Go Go (6 November 2021) (Saturday 9:00 pm to 11:00 pm) (Timeslot on 27 November 2021 onwards, Saturday 10:00 pm to Sunday 12:00 am) (Multiple Seasons) (Reality Television)
- Genius Go Go Go CNY Special 2021 / Genius Go Go Go CNY Special (14 February 2021) (Sunday 1:00 pm to 3:00 pm) (Reality Television) (Festive: Chinese New Year Special Programme)
- The Good Old Days
- The Grand Mansion Gate
- Guess (Reality Television)
- Guess Guess Guess (Weekends 12:30 am to 2:00 am) (Reality Television)
- Guinness Night Show China
- Gujian Qitan
- Happy Camp
- Sing Again, Hera Gu (26 March 2015)
- Holland V
- Hot Shot
- Hottest and Craziest (Reality Television)
  - Hottest and Craziest CNY Special 2021 (27 January 2022) (Thursday 10:00 pm to 11:00 pm) (Reality Television)
- Hungry!
- Hunter X Hunter (1999) (Taiwanese Mandarin dub)
  - Hunter X Hunter (2011) (Taiwanese Mandarin dub)
- Huo Yuanjia
- Hurry Up, Brother
- I am a Singer (Reality Television - Sing Competition Show)
- I Am the Actor (Reality Television - Acting Talent Search Competition Show)
- I Can See Your Voice (South Korean TV program)#Season 6 / I Can See Your Voice (South Korean Edition)#Season 6 (15 August 2020) (Saturday 5:30 pm to 7:00 pm) (Reality Television)
- If You Are the One (repeat of NTV7 programme)
- Impossible challenge (season 1 onwards)
- The In-Laws
- In the Name of Love
- In The Realm of Success
- Into the Sun
- Journey of the Fortune God
- The Journey: A Voyage
- The Journey: Tumultuous Times (repeat of NTV7 programme)
- Keep Running (TV series)/ Keep Running (Reality Television)
  - Keep Running (TV series)#First season / Keep Running Season One (26 October 2018) (Friday 9:30 pm to 11:30 pm) (Reality Television)
  - Keep Running (TV series)#Second season / Keep Running Season Two (14 February 2020 until 7 March 2020 - Friday 9:30 pm to 11:30 pm) (8 August 2020 - Saturday 9:00 pm to 11:00 pm) (Reality Television)
  - Keep Running (TV series)#Third season / Keep Running Season Three (27 March 2021) (Saturday 9:00 pm to 11:00 pm) (Reality Television) (Timeslot on 5 June onwards, Saturday 9:30 pm to 11:30 pm)
  - Keep Running (TV series)#Fourth season / Keep Running Season Four (15 August 2021) (Sunday 9:00 pm to 11:00 pm) (Reality Television) (7 episodes) (Broadcast suspended on 29 August 2021 for chinese movies) (Repeated broadcast on 1 October 2021) (Friday 9:30 pm to 11:30 pm) (10 episodes) (Timeslot on 5 November 2021 onwards, Friday 10:30 pm to 11:30 pm)
- Kekkaishi
- A Kindred Spirit
- Kinship
- King of the show (repeat of ntv7 drama)
- Lavender
- The Law of Ueki
- Legend of the Heavenly Sword and Golden Sabre
- Legend of Nezha
- The Legend of Swordsman
- The Legend of Zhong Kui
- Lego Monkie Kid (also aired on TV3 and NTV7) (8 November 2020) (Sunday 5:00 pm to 5:30 pm)
- Lego Monkie Kid (Movie) (1 November 2020)
- Let's Go! Dream Team
- Lotus Lantern
- Love and Brotherhood
- Love Concierge
- Love Journey
- Love Keeps Going
- Love Live! Series (original Japanese dub)
  - Love Live! School Idol Project
  - Love Live! Nijigasaki High School Idol Club
  - Love Live! Sunshine!!
  - Love Live! Superstar!!
- Love SOS
- The Queen of Lunchtime Cuisine
- M! Countdown
- Magi: The Labyrinth of Magic (Taiwanese Mandarin dub)
- Mamma Mia (repeat of NTV7 programme)
- Meteor Garden
- A Million Dollar Dream
- Mimic King
- Mind Matters
- Mr Con and Ms CSI
- Mr. Player (7 August 2020) (Friday 9:00 pm to 11:00 pm) (Multiple Seasons - Season 6 in 2019, Season 7 in 2020) (Reality Television) (Timeslot on 2 July onwards, Friday 10:00 pm to Saturday 12:00 am)
- My Husband (2003)
- My Little Bride
- My Lucky Star
- My MVP Valentine
- My Sunshine
- Mystery in the Palace
- The Negotiator (Reality Television)
  - The Negotiator Season 1 (22 August 2017) (Tuesday 10:45 pm to Wednesday 12:45 am) (Reality Television)
  - The Negotiator Season 3 (2 February 2018) (Friday 9:30 pm to 11:30 pm) (Reality Television) [(Timeslot on 2 March - 9:30 pm to 12:00 pm, 3 March - 8:30 pm to 11:00 pm, 9 March - 9:30 pm to 11:30 pm, 10 March - 8:30 pm to 10:30 pm, 16 March - 9:30 pm to 11:30 pm, 17 March - 8:30 pm to 10:30 pm)] (Shows broadcast on the same day as China)
  - The Negotiator Season 4 (15 February 2019) (Friday 9:30 pm to 11:30 pm) (Reality Television)
  - The Negotiator Season 5 (1 March 2021) (Sunday 9:30 pm to 11:30 pm) (Reality Television) (Timeslot on 8 March onwards, Sunday 8:30 pm to 10:30 pm)
- New Journey to the West 7 / New Journey to the West 7 (14 November 2020) (Saturday 5:00 pm to 7:00 pm) (Reality Television)
- Noble Aspirations
- Novoland: The Castle in the Sky
- Ode to Joy Season One / Ode to Joy 1 (8 July 2017) (Weekends 10:00 am to 12:00 pm) (repeat of NTV7 programme)
- Ode to Joy Season Two / Ode to Joy 2 (6 August 2020) (Weekdays 6:00 pm to 6:58 pm) (repeat of NTV7 programme)
- Palace
- Perfect Match / If You Are the One (2019 edition) (1 February 2020) (Saturday 5:30 pm to 7:00 pm) (Repeat broadcast on 8 May 2021, Saturday 11:00 pm to Sunday 12:30 am) (Timeslot on 5 June 2021 onwards, Saturday 11:30 pm to Sunday 1:00 am) (Reality Television)
- Pick Me for a Spring Festival Gala
- Pilgrimage of Wealth 2
- Pinocchio
- Precious Youth
- Pretty Li Hui Zhen (repeat of NTV7 programme)
- Primary Tea House
- Prince Hours
- The Best Things in my life
- The Prince Who Turns into a Frog
- Princess Meili
- Produce Camp 2020 (29 May 2020) (Friday and Saturday 9:00 pm to 11:00 pm) (Broadcast time for 29 May and 5 June: 9:30 pm to 12:30 pm) (Reality Television - Talent Search Competition Show)
- Produce X 101 / Produce X 101 (16 June 2019) (Reality Television - Talent Search Competition Show)
- The Proud Twins
- Ranma ½ (Taiwanese Mandarin dub)
- Reborn! (Taiwanese Mandarin dub)
- Road to Kingdom / Road to Kingdom (27 February 2021) (Saturday 5:30 pm to 7:00 pm) (Reality Television)
- Rolling Love
- Roof of the World
- Roseate-Love
- Rose in the wind
- Royal Romance
- Run for Money Tosochuu
- Saiyuki (2000) (Taiwanese Mandarin dub)
- Saiyuki (2006)
- Shake It Up (14 September 2020) (Saturday 8:30 pm to 10:00 pm) (Reality Television - Dance Talent Search Competition Show)
- Sidewalk Scientist
- Sing My Song
- Smiling Pasta
- Super Diva Season 6 (12 May 2019) (Sunday 5:00 pm to 6:30 pm) (Reality Television - Talent Search Competition Show)
- Super Diva Season 7 (18 April 2020) (Saturday 11:00 pm to Sunday 1:00 am) (Reality Television - Talent Search Competition Show) (Season 7 - Repeat broadcast on 22 May 2021, Saturday 5:30 pm to 7:00 pm)
- Super Idol
- Super Trio series
- Super Trio Maximus
- Sugar Sugar Rune
- Stay Healthy, Be Happy: Bie Rang Shen Ti Bu Kai Xin
- Star avenue
- Star Awards 2021 (31 January 2022) (Monday 5:00 pm to 7:30 pm) (Reality Television - Actor/Actress Awards Show)
- Successor of Chinese Culture Image
- Super boys
- Reply 1997
- Surgeon Bong Dal-hee
- Taiwan Ah Cheng
- Taiwan Food Delights
- Telling Maria
- The Adventure of the Young (Season 2) (20 November 2020) (Friday 9:00 pm to 10:45 pm) (Repeated on 14 August 2021, Sunday 1:00 am to 2:30 am) (Reality Television)
- The Flash Band (7 January 2022) (Friday 10:00 pm to 11:30 pm) (Reality Television - Group Sing Competition Show)
- The Magical Needle
- The Next: Tian Lai Zhi Zhan
- The Shining Star
- The Treasured Voice 3 (2 April 2022) (Saturday 9:00 pm to 11:00 pm) (Timeslot on 23 April 2022 onwards, Saturday 9:30 pm to 11:30 pm) (Reality Television - Sing Competition Show)
- The Ultimatum
- The Voice From Heaven (Season 1) (16 February 2020) (Sunday 8:30 pm to 10:30 pm) (Season 1 - Repeated on 23 May 2021, Sunday 3:00 pm to 5:00 pm) (Reality Television - Sing Competition Show)
- Toyama Japan, How Delicious (31 January 2021) (Sunday 5:00 pm to 6:00 pm) (Reality Television) (Exact broadcast start date: Unconfirmed)
- TVB 52nd Anniversary Gala / TVB Anniversary Gala Show (12 February 2021) (Friday 5:00 pm to 7:00 pm) (Reality Television - Actor/Actress Awards Show) (Repeat broadcast on 20 February 2021) (Saturday 3:00 pm to 5:00 pm) (Repeat broadcast on 13 November 2021) (Saturday 3:00 pm to 5:00 pm)
- TVB 53rd Anniversary Gala / TVB Anniversary Gala Show (1 February 2022) (Tuesday 5:00 pm to 7:00 pm) (Reality Television - Actor/Actress Awards Show)
- Twenty four hours
- Ultimate Variety Show
- Unveil The Truth
- Variety Big Brother
- Viva Le Famille
- Sing! China / Sing!China (formerly known as The Voice of China) (16 July 2016) (Saturday 8:30 pm to 10:30 pm) (Multiple Seasons - Season 1 from 16 July 2016, Season 2 from 14 July 2017, Season 3 from 13 July 2018, Season 4 from 19 July 2019) (Reality Television - Sing Talent Search Competition Show)
- Sing! China 2019 (Season 4) (19 July 2019) (Friday 9:30 pm to 11:30 pm) (Reality Television - Sing Talent Search Competition Show)
- Wanted: Son-In Law
- We Fall in Love
- Where Are We Going, Dad?
- Who Are You?
- Winter Sonata
- Wok of Life
- Women of Times
- Wonderful Life
- X-Space II
- Ying Ye 3 Jia 1
- Yong Chun
- You Can Be An Angel Too
- Young Forever Season 2 (19 December 2020) (Saturday 9:00 pm to 10:40 pm) (Reality Television - Group Sing Competition) (Repeat broadcast on 22 August 2021, Sunday 11:00 pm to Monday 12:30 am) (Repeat broadcast on 30 April 2022, Saturday 11:30 pm to Sunday 1:00 am)
- Yours Fatefully
- Youth and Melody (19 June 2021) (Saturday 9:30 pm to 11:30 pm) (Repeated on 16 January 2022, 12:00 am to 1:30 am) (Reality Television - Group Sing Competition)
- Yummy Show

2014

- Empress Ki / Empress Ki (26 June) (Weekdays 5:00 pm to 6:00 pm)
- For You In Full Blossom (13 December) (Saturday 10:30 am to 12:30 pm)

2015

- Misaeng (8 January) (Thursday to Friday 10:30 pm to 12:00 am)
- Alice in Cheongdam-dong / Cheongdam-dong Scandal (7 March) (Saturday 10:30 am to 12:30 pm)
- Sing Again, Hera Gu (26 March) (Thursday to Friday 10:30 pm to 12:00 am)
- Potato Star 2013QR3 (Approximate date: 29 March) From 29 March to 21 June (Sunday 4:30 pm to 6:00 pm) From 27 June to October 3 (Saturday 4:00 pm to 5:30 pm)

2016

- Perfect Couple (6 April) (Weekdays 5:00 pm to 6:00 pm)
- Diamond Lover / Diamond Lover (8 June) (Weekdays 5:00 pm to 6:00 pm)

2018

- Great Expectations (23 November) (Friday 10:30 pm to 12:30 am)
- Sweet Dreams / Sweet Dreams (23 December) (Sunday 3:00 pm to 5:00 pm) (2 episodes back to back) (Drama suspended on 17 February 2019)

Weekdays 6:00 pm to 7:00 pm drama:

2007

- Unique Flavor / Unique Flavor (Exact date and month: Unknown)

2008

- Love and Affection (25 April)
- Love Above All / Love In The Vineyard (24 September 2008 to 12 February 2010)

2010

- My Family My Love / Parent's Love (18 February 2010 to 28 June 2011)

2011
2012
2013
2014

- Lee's Family Reunion / Lee's Family Reunion (29 June 2011 to 20 February 2014)

2014
2015

- The Heart of Woman / The Heart of Women (21 February 2014 to 27 December 2016)

2016

- Stepmother's Spring (28 December)

2017

- First Love (24 February)
- The Empress of China / The Empress of China (21 April)
- The Journey of Flower / The Journey of Flower (4 August)
- The Adoption (16 October)
- Legend of Dragon Pearl / Legend of the Dragon Pearl (14 December) (Drama suspended on 15 February 2018 and 16 February 2018)

== Best Of Hokkien (Series imported from Taiwan) ==
These Hokkien-language programmes are made by Taiwan studios that are mostly edited to fit in the one-hour period of the broadcast channel. There are six different timeslots for these segments: 11:30 am to 12:30 pm, 1:00 to 2:00 pm, 4:00 pm to 5:00 pm (formerly on 20 April 2018), and 6:00 pm to 7:00 pm (formerly on 24 September 2008) from Weekdays, 2:00 pm to 3:00 pm and 3:00 pm to 4:00 pm on Weekends. For Weekdays Taiwan drama segments, there are 2 timeslots, which are 1:00 pm to 2:00 pm (since 31 December 2018) and 3:30 pm to 4:30 pm (since 2 January 2019) from Weekdays.

Note: Timeslots are affected by the Chinese Midday News from 12:30 pm to 1:00 pm for shows in between 11:30 am to 2:00 pm.

Please do not edit this section temporarily as the drama series here are in a mess and requires a proper subsection based on their respective debut broadcast time, day of broadcast (e.g.: Weekday/Weekends). Only edit this when you are able to help sort them out to their respective subsection.

- Ma Zu & Guan Yin (Repeated on 13 April 2021) (Weekdays 9:30 am to 10:30 am)
- Shun Niang

2011

- The Amazing Strategist Liu Bowen (22 January) (Weekdays 11:30 am to 12:30 pm and 1:00 pm to 2:00 pm)
- The Spirit of Love / Love (27 June) (Weekdays 11:30 am to 12:30 pm and 1:00 pm to 2:00 pm)

2013

- Mom's House / A Place Called Home (2 January) (11:30 am to 12:30 pm and 1:00 pm to 2:00 pm)

2014

- Legend of Taiwan (Multiple Seasons) (2014) (Weekends 2:00 pm to 3:00 pm)

2015

- Night Market Life / Night Market Life (1 January 2015) (Weekdays 11:30 am to 12:30 pm and 1:00 pm to 2:00 pm)
- Taiwan Tornado / Taiwan Tornado (Approximate date: 9 June) (Previously broadcast on NTV7 channel on 20 April 2011 (11:30 am to 12:30 pm and 1:00 pm to 2:00 pm)

2016

- Haru (TV series) / Chun Mei – Haru (16 December 2016) (Weekdays 11:30 am to 12:30 pm and 1:00 pm to 2:00 pm)

2017

- If God Loves (24 January) (Weekdays 11:30 am to 12:30 pm and 1:00 pm to 2:00 pm) (Timeslot on 27 March 2017 onwards, Weekdays 11:30 am to 12:30 pm)
- Dragon Dance (21 June) (Weekdays 1:00 pm to 2:00 pm)

2018

- Life of Pearl (20 April) (Weekdays 5:00 pm to 6:00 pm) (Timeslot on 4 June 2018 onwards, Weekdays 4:00 pm to 5:00 pm)
- 100% Wife (7 June) (Drama suspended on 31 August 2018, 25 October 2018, 25 December 2018, 31 December 2018) (Drama suspended on 4 February 2019 until 7 February 2019, 11 October 2019, 25 December 2019) (Weekdays 4:00 pm to 5:00 pm) (Timeslot on 2 January 2019 onwards, Weekdays 3:30 pm to 4:30 pm)
- The King of Drama (4 October) (Weekdays 1:00 pm to 2:00 pm)
- My Sister (31 December) (Weekdays 1:00 pm to 2:00 pm)

2019

- An Adopted Daughter (18 February) (Weekdays 1:00 pm to 2:00 pm)
- Sun After The Rain (21 March) (Weekdays 1:00 pm to 2:00 pm)
- Flavor of Life (10 April) (Weekdays 11:30 am to 12:30 pm)
- Once Upon a Time in Beitou (11 July) (Weekdays 1:00 pm to 2:00 pm) (Drama repeated on 12 August 2020, Weekdays 9:30 am to 10:30 am)
- Father's Wish (29 August) (Weekdays 1:00 pm to 2:00 pm) (Drama repeated on 1 October 2020, Weekdays 9:30 am to 10:30 am)
- Beautiful Makeover (31 October) (Weekdays 1:00 pm to 2:00 pm) (Drama suspended on 24 January 2020, 27 January 2020)
- The Making of an Ordinary Woman (21 December) (Weekends 3:00 pm to 4:00 pm) (Drama repeated on 5 July 2021, Weekends 5:00 pm to 6:00 pm)

2020

- The Love Story in Banana Orchard (29 January) (Weekdays 3:30 pm to 4:30 pm) (Drama repeated on 19 April 2021, Weekdays 1:00 pm to 2:00 pm) (Drama repeated on 19 April 2022, Weekdays 9:45 am to 10:35 am)
- The Sound Of Happiness (16 March) (Weekdays 3:30 pm to 5:30 pm) (2 episodes back to back) (Only 1 episode broadcast instead of 2 on 16 March) (Only 1 episode broadcast instead of 2 on 15 April 2020 and 22 April 2020) (Drama suspended on 6 November 2020, 11 February 2021, 12 February 2021)

2021

- Legend of Taiwan Season 13 / Legend of Taiwan (31 July) (Weekends 2:00 pm to 3:00 pm) (Repeated on 24 January 2022) (Weekdays 10:30 am to 11:30 am) (Timeslot change from 8 April 2022 onwards, 9:45 am to 10:30 am)
- In the Name of Love (22 September) (Weekdays 3:30 pm to 5:30 pm) (2 episodes back to back)

2022

- Born Into Loving Hands (3 January) (Weekdays 3:30 pm to 5:30 pm) (2 episodes back to back) (Timeslot for first episode on 3 January 2022 from 4:30 pm to 5:30 pm) (Drama suspended on 31 January until 4 February)
- Legend of Taiwan Season 14 / Legend of Taiwan (29 January) (Weekends 2:00 pm to 3:00 pm)
- Great Times (6 May) (2 episodes back to back)

== Best Of Local ==
These programmes are locally produced Chinese programmes and former programmes in English and Malay. These programmes are broadcast in various timeslots.

- 5 Jingga
- 8 Chart Show
- 8 Corners
- 8TV 18th Anniversary Bonanza (Sponsored by Abbott Laboratories - Ensure Malaysia - Ensure Gold) (Reality Television) (Repeat broadcast on 15 January 2022)
- 8 E-News (8 January 2004 – present)
- 8 Mini Century
- 8 Style
- Alert
- Alice in Wonderland (repeat of NTV7 drama)
- Amusing Race
- Away from Home (repeat of NTV7 drama)
- A New Journey (February 2021)
- A beautiful world (repeat of NTV7 drama)
- Behind The Scam
- Best In The World
- The Best of Latte
- Blogger Boy
- Brilliant Mind
- CJ Wow Shop
- Celebrity Chat
- China Star
- Crime Scene
- Da Funki Monkee
- Destinasi Bajet (Reality Television - Travel Show)
- Discover Smiles Zoom Malaysia
- Double Triple or Nothing
  - Double Triple or Nothing Kidsgirls
- Durian, Kaya, Teh Tarik (Season Two) (2020) (Reality Television - Game Show)
- Eve's Diary (2013)
- Eyes on You
- Famous Chinese Cuisine
- Fantasia: A Modern Fairy Tale
- Folks and Tales
- Footprints in history
- G-Thang
- Ghost
- Go-Go-Go
- Go Travel (Reality Television - Travel Show)
- The Gossip World
- Hey Morning
- Hip Hoppin Asia
- Ho Chak! (Reality Television)
  - Ho Chak! Japan (2017)
- Hot Chef
- Hot FM AM KREW
- I am not a loser (repeat of NTV7 drama)
- I Can See Your Voice Malaysia (Chinese version)
- I Dare You!
- I Wanna Be A Model (Reality Television - Modelling Talent Search Competition Show)
- Identity Switched (repeat of NTV7 drama)
- In-Laws 2 (repeat of NTV7 drama)
- Journey To Royal Cuisine
- Kan-Cheong Kitchen (Reality Television - Cooking Competition Show)
- King of Dessert
- KL Lights
- Latte @ 8
- Let's Cycle
- Let's Cycle (Season Two) (Repeat broadcast on 8 September 2021)
- Let's Cycle (Season Three) (Repeat broadcast on 8 December 2021)
- Love in Seoul
- Majalah 3: All Covid-19 Specials Series (Mandarin Subtitled) (Reality Television - Documentary)
- Malaysian Idol (Reality Television - Sing Talent Search Competition Show)
- Malaysia's Most Beautiful
- The Memoir Of Majie (Repeat of NTV7 drama)
- Memories Puzzle (Repeat broadcast on 23 August 2021) (Reality Television)
- Midday Mandarin News
- Mission I'm Possible
- Money Matters (Season Three) (Reality Television) (Repeat broadcast on 23 August 2021)
- Move It!
- Nescafé Kick-Start
- A New Journey
- Next Miss Universe Malaysia
- Now Everyone Can Fly To Australia
- Ohayo
- On The Brink (repeat of NTV7 drama)
- One in a Million (2006-2009) (Reality Television - Sing Talent Search Competition Show)
- Oppa! Oppa! (repeat of NTV7 drama)
- Part Of The Game
- Perfect Match
- Persona (repeat of NTV7 drama)
- Please Give Me a Job!
- Project Runway Malaysia (Reality Television - Fashion Design Talent Search Competition Show)
- Project Superstar (Reality Television - Sing Talent Search Competition Show)
- Pulse of life (repeat of NTV7 drama)
- Punch and Jude
- Realiti
- Reel Review
- Revolving Heart (repeat of NTV7 drama)
- Secret of Success
- So You Think You Can Dance (Reality Television - Dance Talent Search Competition Show)
- Spec-Ops
- Star Avenue (repeat of NTV7 drama)
- Step Forward
- Summer Live Concert
- Summer Brothers (repeat of NTV7 drama)
- Superhero at home (repeat of NTV7 drama)
- Taste of Malaysia: Martin Yan (Chinese) (Reality Television - Cooking Show)
- Taste of Chinese New Year
- Taste of life
- Teman
- The Injustice Stranger (repeat of NTV7 drama)
- The Liar (repeat of NTV7 drama)
- The Precedents (repeat of NTV7 drama)
- The Pulse Of Life (repeat of NTV7 drama)
- The Turning Point (repeat of NTV7 drama)
- The Undercover (repeat of NTV7 drama)
- Total Europe Explore
- Top Student (2019) (Reality Television)
- Treasure Hunt in Malaysia
- Trippin
- Twenty Hundred
- The Ultimate Power Group
- The Ultimate Power Song
- The Ultimate Power Star
- The Ultimate Prom Nite
- Unchained Fate
- Unveil The Truth
- Upin & Ipin (Singapore Mandarin dub)
- We Are One Malaysia
- Welcome to the Rail World
  - Welcome to the Rail World Japan
- Without Boundaries
- Wow Shop (Formerly known as CJ Wow Shop) (1 November 2020) (Daily) (Reality Television - Teleshopping/Shopping channels)
- The Z Power (2019) (Sponsored by Massimo and V soy) (Reality Television)

2006

- Gol & Gincu The Series#Season 1 (4 June)

2007

- Sky (6 May)
- Gol & Gincu The Series#Season 2 (8 July)

2008

- Goodnight DJ Season 1 (6 January) (Repeat broadcast on 16 August 2021) (Timeslot on 23 August 2021 onwards)
- Step of Dance (6 July)
- Alam's Story (3 August)
- Love Is Not Blind (23 November)

2009

- A Cup of Love (5 July)
- Cheer 2009 (24 July) (Friday 9:30 pm onwards) (Reality Television - Cheerleading Documentary Show)
- The Adjusters (25 October) (Repeat broadcast on 15 November 2021)

2010

- My Secret Chef (29 August)
- Goodnight DJ Season 2 (17 October) (Repeat broadcast on 27 September 2021)

2011

- The Adjusters 2 (2 October)
- Model A la Mode (8 December)

2012

- The Beat (18 November)

2013

- Dive into Love (3 March) (Repeat broadcast on 7 June 2021)
- What If (5 June)
- Justice Bao Jr. (17 August)
- Mr. Bun (1 December)

2014

- 3.15 AM (3 August)

2015

- The Stalker (10 December)

2016

- I Wanna Sing (9 October) (Sunday 8:30 pm onwards) (Reality Television - Sing Talent Search Competition Show)

2017

- I Can See Your Voice Malaysia Mandarin Season 1 (20 August 2017) (Reality Television)
- Growth Behind The Sun (6 October) (Repeat on 7 August 2020)
- Beautiful World - My Pet Lover (5 November) (Drama repeated on 19 September 2021) (Local drama series)

2018

- Singing in the Spring (5 February) (Local drama series) (Drama repeated on 2 January 2022) (2 episodes back to back)
- I Can See Your Voice Malaysia Season 2 (19 August) (Repeat broadcast on 7 November 2021) (Reality Television)

2019

- Durian, Kaya, Teh Tarik (24 February) (Reality Television - Game Show)
- Behind The Scam (Season 2) (10 November) (Repeat broadcast on 3 October 2020) (10 episodes) (Repeat broadcast on 24 June 2021) (3 episodes) (Repeat broadcast on 2 October 2021) (4 episodes)

2020

- Family Singing Show (2 August) (Sponsored by Ebene) (Reality Television - Family Singing Competition Show)
- The Z Power 2020 (11 October) (Sponsored by GlaxoSmithKline - Scott's DHA Gummies) (Reality Television)
- Top Student 2020 (20 December) (Reality Television)

2021

- Fortune Special 2021 (31 January) (Reality Television - Festive: Chinese New Year Seasonal Fortune Telling Show)
- Family Singing Show CNY Special (12 February) (Reality Television) (Festive: Chinese New Year Singing Show)
- Bonus Vacation (13 February)
- The Z Power Special (11 April, 18 April) (Reality Television)
- Durian, Kaya, Teh Tarik (Season Three) (18 April) (Reality Television - Game Show)
- Ho Chak! 2021/Ho Chak! Eat Live Well (18 April) (Show resume on 7 November 2021) (Reality Television) (Repeat broadcast on 12 November 2021)
- Taste of Memory (5 June) (Reality Television) (Repeat broadcast on 24 July 2021) (Repeat broadcast on 6 February 2022)
- Family Singing Show Season 2 (6 June) (Sponsored by Ginvera) (Reality Television - Family Singing Competition Show)
- A New Journey (Season 8) (11 June) (Reality Television) (Repeat broadcast on 21 June 2021)
- ACCCIM Centennial History Documentary (25 June) (Reality Television)
- Celebrities Living REC (2 July) (Reality Television) (Repeat broadcast on 2 October 2021) (2 episodes back to back)
- Family Health (11 July) (Reality Television) (Repeat broadcast on 15 July 2021)
- Back to the Foodture (8 August) (Reality Television)
- Click to Health (10 October) (Reality Television) (Repeat broadcast on 14 October 2021)
- The Elite Talk (5 November) (Reality Television)
- Love At First Song (7 November) (Sponsored by Cuckoo Malaysia - Wonderdewi by Wonderlab) (Reality Television - Couple Search Singing Talent Competition Show)
- Girls Day Out (26 November) (Reality Television) (Repeat broadcast on 29 November 2021), (Repeat broadcast on 26 March 2022)
- Shila Amzah Masterclass (27 November) (Broadcast suspended on 8 January) (Broadcast resumed on 15 January) (Sponsored by Duopharma - Flavettes Effervescent H-Drate) (Reality Television - Singing Competition Show)

2022

- Majalah 3: The Cries for Help of Klang Valley (2 January) (Mandarin Subtitled) (Reality Television - Documentary)
- 8 E-News Mini Concert (8 January)
- Fortune Special 2022 (9 January) (Reality Television - Festive: Chinese New Year Seasonal Fortune Telling Show) (Repeat broadcast on 24 January, 25 January, 31 January and 8 February 2022)
- Cook Vs Chef (16 January) (Sponsored by Panasonic Malaysia - Panasonic Cooking) (Reality Television - Cooking Competition Show)
- Ho Chak! CNY Special 2022 (30 January) (Repeat broadcast on 2 February 2022)
- A New Journey CNY Special 2022 (31 January) (Reality Television) (Repeat broadcast on 2 February 2022)
- Durian, Kaya, Teh Tarik CNY Special 2022 (1 February, 2 February), (Repeat broadcast on 4 February 2022, 5 February 2022)
- Yoohoo 2022 (1 February) (Reality Television)
- Anticipating the World (Sponsored by S P Setia) (3 February)
- King Of Travelogue (11 February) (Reality Television - Travel Show) (Repeat broadcast on 15 February 2022)
- Durian, Kaya, Teh Tarik (Season Four) (13 February) (Reality Television - Game Show)
- Ho Chak! 2022/Ho Chak! Food Transformer (3 April) (Sponsored by Ginvera) (Reality Television) (Repeat broadcast on 8 April 2022)
- Journey To Homeland (23 April) (Saturday 9:00 pm to 9:30 pm) (Reality Television - Travel Show)
- Dream It! Do It! (8 May) (Sunday 6:00 pm onwards) (Reality Television)
- I Am The Show (8 May) (Sunday 9:00 pm onwards) (Reality Television - Acting Talent Search Competition Show)
- The Hidden Gems (23 July)
- Family Singing Show Season 3 (24 July)
- Money Matters Season 4 (12 August)
- The Z Power Season 3 (10 September)
- Click to Health Season 2 (2 October)
- Ultimate Dance Crew (23 October) (Sponsored by Celcom Xpax) (Reality Television)

== Best Of TVB (Series imported from Hong Kong) ==
These series are produced by Hong Kong's Television Broadcasts Ltd. Sometimes the timeslot may be replaced by a Chinese TV series (Asian Hour) or a non-TVB Cantonese TV series as an interim. The timeslot is set at 7:00 pm to 8:00 pm from Monday to Friday.

- Beyond the Realm of Conscience
- Burning Flame III
- Catch Me Now
- Devil's Disciples
- Dicey Business
- D.I.E.
- The Four
- Glittering Days
- A Great Way to Care
- Heart of Greed
- A Journey Called Life
- Land of Wealth
- Last One Standing
- Legend of the Demigods
- Heart of Greed 2
- Rosy Business
- The Silver Chamber of Sorrows
- Survivor's Law II
- To Grow with Love
- The Ultimate Crime Fighter
- Wars of In-Laws II

2010

- The Ultimate Crime Fighter (21 January)
- A Journey Called Life (17 March)
- Wars of In-Laws II (14 April)
- Survivor's Law II (12 Mei)
- The Silver Chamber Of Sorrows (8 Jun)
- D.I.E. (8 Julai)
- Moonlight Resonance (12 Ogos)
- The Four (8 October)
- Ghost Catcher, Legend of Beauty (Zhongkui) (15 November)

2011

- Legend of the Demigods (10 Januari)
- Catch Me Now (11 Februari)
- Last One Standing (14 March)
- Rosy Business (13 April)
- Wing Chun (18 May)
- Just Love II (13 July)
- You're Hired (17 August)
- Burning Flame III (19 September)
- Beyond the Realm of Conscience (2 November)
- D.I.E. Again (19 December)

2012

- A Chip Off the Old Block (26 January)
- Mysteries of Love (24 February)
- A Fistful of Stances (30 March)
- In the Eye of the Beholder (4 May)
- Beauty Of The Game (20 July)
- Can't Buy Me Love (17 August)
- Every Move You Make (3 October)
- When Lanes Merge (31 October)
- No Regrets (28 November)

2013

- Beauty Knows No Pain (11 January)
- Ghetto Justice (8 February)
- The Rippling Blossom (12 March)
- Grace Under Fire(9 April)
- Twilight Investigation (23 May)
- Yes, Sir. Sorry, Sir! (20 June)
- Curse of the Royal Harem(27 September)
- Bottled Passion (11 November)
- The Life and Times of a Sentinel (10 December)

2014

- L'Escargot (15 January)
- Ghetto Justice II (28 February)
- Queens of Diamonds and Hearts (31 March)
- The Hippocratic Crush (5 May)
- Witness Insecurity / Witness Insecurity (10 June)
- The Demi-Gods and Semi-Devils / The Demi-Gods and Semi-Devils (7 August)
- Silver Spoon, Sterling Shackles / Silver Spoon, Sterling Shackles (22 September)
- House of Harmony and Vengeance (17 November)
- Divas in Distress (29 December)

2015

- King Maker (28 January)
- A Great Way to Care II (12 March)
- A Change of Heart (16 April)
- The Hippocratic Crush II (23 July)
- Will Power (3 September)
- Brother's Keeper (19 October)
- Return of the Silver Tongue (2 December)

2016

- Gilded Chopsticks (6 January)
- Ghost Dragon of Cold Mountain (15 February)
- Overachievers (28 March)
- All That Is Bitter Is Sweet (9 May)
- The Ultimate Addiction (6 September)
- Officer Geomancer (18 October)
- Noblesse Oblige (15 November)
- Lady Sour (14 December)

2017

- Eye in the Sky (11 January)
- Smooth Talker (10 February)
- Wudang Rules (10 March)
- Ghost of Relativity (23 June)
- Under the Veil (2 August)
- With or Without You (30 August)
- Captain of Destiny (11 October)
- Short End of the Stick (24 November)

2018

- Fashion War (12 January)
- K9 Cop (9 February)
- Over Run Over (13 March)
- Fire of Eternal Love / Fire of Eternal Love (12 April) (Drama repeated on 22 July 2020, Wednesday 11:00 pm to Thursday 12:30 am and Thursday 11:00 pm to Friday 12:30 am)
- The Last Healer in Forbidden City / The Last Healer In Forbidden City (26 June)
- House of Spirits / House of Spirits (24 July)
- The Great Adventurer Wesley (5 September)
- Brother's Keeper II / Brother's Keeper II (25 October)
- A Fist Within Four Walls / A Fist Within Four Walls (19 December)

2019

- Burning Hands / Burning Hands (28 January)
- Provocateur / Provocateur (12 March)
- A General, a Scholar and a Eunuch / A General, A Scholar and A Eunuch (16 April)
- My Unfair Lady / My Unfair Lady (30 May)
- The Exorcist's Meter / The Exorcist's Meter (9 July)
- The Unholy Alliance (TV series) / The Unholy Alliance (6 August)
- Story of Yanxi Palace / Story of Yanxi Palace (16 September) (Drama repeated on 4 January 2020 and 21 October 2020)
- The Forgotten Valley (23 December)

2020

- Deep in the Realm of Conscience / Deep In The Realm Of Conscience (20 January)
- Another Era / Another Era (12 March)
- The Ghetto-Fabulous Lady (1 May)
- Barrack O'Karma / Barrack O'karma (5 June) (Drama repeated on 10 February 2021, Weekdays 1:00 pm to 2:00 pm)
- Eternal Love of Dream / Eternal Love, The Pillow Book (3 July) (Drama repeated on 22 June 2021, Monday 11:00 pm to Tuesday 12:30 am and Tuesday 11:00 pm to Wednesday 12:30 am) (Timeslot for first episode on 22 June 2021 from 11:50 pm to 12:30 am)
- Wonder Women (21 September) (Drama repeated on 15 March 2021, Weekdays 1:00 pm to 2:00 pm)
- Reunion: The Sound of the Providence (26 October) (Drama repeated on 12 August 2021, Tuesday to Friday 12:30 am to 1:30 am) (Drama repeated on 9 April 2022, Weekends 5:00 pm to 6:00 pm)
- Big White Duel / Big White Duel (9 December) (Drama repeated on 19 April 2021, Weekdays 1:00 pm to 2:00 pm)

2021

- The Defected / The Defected (13 January) (Drama repeated on 19 August 2021, Weekdays 1:00 pm to 2:00 pm)
- Our Unwinding Ethos / Our Unwinding Ethos (26 February) (Drama repeated on 30 September 2021, Weekdays 1:00 pm to 2:00 pm)
- Airport Strikers (2 April) (Sponsored by Kinohimitsu) (Drama repeated on 4 November 2021, Weekdays 1:00 pm to 2:00 pm)
- Forensic Heroes IV / Forensic Heroes IV (7 May) (Drama repeated on 9 December 2021, Weekdays 1:00 pm to 2:00 pm)
- Flying Tiger 2 / Flying Tiger II (18 June) (Sponsored by GlaxoSmithKline Malaysia - Sensodyne) (Drama repeated on 20 January 2022, Weekdays 1:00 pm to 2:00 pm)
- The Exorcist's 2nd Meter / The Exorcist's 2nd Meter (30 July) (Drama repeated on 10 March 2022, Weekdays 1:00 pm to 2:00 pm) (Broadcast suspended on 4 April 2022 for The 2022 64th Annual Grammy Awards)
- Al Cappuccino / Al Cappuccino (3 September) (Sponsored by GlaxoSmithKline Malaysia - Parodontax)
- The Witness (15 October) (Sponsored by GlaxoSmithKline Malaysia - Sensodyne)
- Line Walker: Bull Fight / Line Walker: Bull Fight (12 November)

2022

- Armed Reaction 2021 (4 January)
- Beauty And The Boss (22 February)
- Sinister Beings / Sinister Beings (5 April) (Sponsored by GlaxoSmithKline Malaysia - Sensodyne)
- Final Destiny (17 May)
- AI Romantic (14 June)
- The Line Watchers (26 July)
- Kids' Lives Matter (1 September) (Sponsored by GlaxoSmithKline Malaysia - Sensodyne)
- Take Two (6 October)
- The Ring Master (10 November)
- The Righteous Fists (15 Disember) (Sponsored by GlaxoSmithKline Malaysia - Sensodyne)

2023

- Modern Dynasty / Modern Dynasty (31 January)
- Flying Tiger III (14 March) (Sponsored by GlaxoSmithKline Malaysia - Sensodyne)
- Brutally Young 2.0 / Brutally Young 2.0 (25 April)
- Big White Duel 2 (23 May) (Sponsored by GlaxoSmithKline Malaysia - Sensodyne)

These series are produced by Hong Kong's Television Broadcasts Ltd. The timeslot is set at 7:00 pm to 8:00 pm Saturday and Sunday.

2018

- Blue Veins (9 June) (1st Weekend drama, originally planned for broadcast on NTV7)
- Law dis-Order / Law dis-Order (30 September)

2019

- Tiger Mom Blues / Tiger Mom Blues (6 January)
- Destination Nowhere (17 March)
- Oh My Grad (30 June)
- Heart of Greed 3 / Heart and Greed 3 (13 October)

2020

- Daddy Cool (8 March)
- Flying Tiger (11 July)
- Succession War / Succession War (24 October) (Sponsored by Nestlé Malaysia - Milo Malaysia)

2021

- The Learning Curve of a Warlord (30 January) (Sponsored by GlaxoSmithKline Malaysia - Sensodyne)
- Of Greed and Ants / Of Greed And Ants (16 May)
- The Dripping Sauce (29 August)
- Brutally Young / Brutally Young (12 December)

== TVB Weekend ==
This is a new segment from 2022 onwards, which broadcast series from Hong Kong's Television Broadcasts Ltd. The drama timeslot for this segment is set at Weekends 7:00 pm to 8:00 pm.

2022

- Life After Death (TV series) / Life After Death (20 February)
- Plan “B” (5 May) (Sponsored by GlaxoSmithKline Malaysia - Sensodyne)
- Battle Of The Seven Sisters (14 August)
- A Love of No Words (13 November)

2023

- The Kwoks And What (4 February)
- The Runner (30 April) (Sponsored by GlaxoSmithKline Malaysia - Sensodyne)

== Best Of The East (Chinese and formerly Korean drama series) ==
These series are produced by Chinese TV studios (mostly mainland), South Korean TV studios (known as Korean drama), and Taiwanese studios; their drama broadcast timeslot is set at 8:30 pm to 9:30 pm from Monday to Thursday (Friday included since 2019). These series also include the overlapping of Hito Theatre. These series also includes Primori 8 segment which are 8TV Chinese local drama series. Due to 8TV Mandarin News broadcast time changes, the timeslot was adjusted starting from the week of 8 June 2020 onwards, which is from 9:00 pm to 10:00 pm. During the same week, the drama broadcast days change again which is from every Monday to Thursday.

- Coffee Prince
- The Abandoned Secrets
- Big
- Bull Fighting
- Faith
- Flaming Butterfly
- The Fugitive: Plan B
- Full House
- Get Karl! Oh Soo-jung
- Ghost Catcher 2
- Glory Jane
- Gourmet
- The Greatest Love
- Green Rose
- Heaven Dragon
- The Hospital
- Iljimae
- In Love With Power
- Bread, Love and Dreams
- Legend of Fang De and Miao Cui Hua
- The Legend of Great Chinese Surgeon-Huo Tuo
- Legend of Speed
- Loving You
- Miss No Good
- Miss Ripley
- My Girlfriend Is a Nine-Tailed Fox
- My Princess
- Night After Night
- One Mom and Three Dads
- Paladins in Troubled Times
- Personal Taste
- Princess Hours
- Secret Garden
- Snow Angel
- Stairway to Heaven
- Storm Rider II
- Summer Scent
- Time Between Dog and Wolf
- Why Why Love
- Wonderful Life

2004

- Jewel in the Palace / Dae Jang Geum (End of December) (Replayed in 2005)

2008

- The Legend of Bruce Lee / The Legend of Bruce Lee (26 October)

2009

- Beethoven Virus / Beethoven Virus (5 October) (Weekdays 8:30 pm to 9:30 pm)
- Easy Fortune Happy Life / Easy Fortune Happy Life (9 November)
- Boys Over Flowers / Boys Over Flowers (16 December)

2010

- Pandamen / Pandamen (2 February)
- The Heaven Sword and Dragon Saber / The Heaven Sword and Dragon Saber (17 March)
- Brilliant Legacy / Brilliant Legacy (12 May)
- My Fair Lady / My Fair Lady (5 July)
- Journey to the West (2010) / Journey to the West (9 August)
- Style / Style (15 October)
- Oh! My Lady / Oh! My Lady (16 November)
- You're Beautiful / You're Beautiful (14 December)

2011

- A Time To Embrace (13 January) (Local drama series)
- All Men Are Brothers / All Men Are Brothers (1 March)

2012

- Can't Lose / Hate to Lose (12 November)

2013

- City Hunter / City Hunter (10 January)
- Protect the Boss / Protect the Boss (1 February)
- Moon Embracing the Sun / Moon Embracing the Sun (28 March)
- Swordsman / Swordsman (7 May)
- The Legend of Kublai Khan (11 September)
- The Innocent Man The Innocent Man (20 November)
- Rooftop Prince(Date Unknown)

2014

- The Stand-In The Stand-In (7 May)
- Palace 3: The Lost Daughter / The Palace: the Lost Daughter (30 September)
- Nine: Nine Time Travels / Nine: Nine Time Travels (1 December)
- The Good Doctor / The Good Doctor (29 December)

2015

- The Inheritors / The Heirs (5 February)
- My Love From the Stars / My Love from the Star (18 March)
- The Romance of the Condor Heroes / The Romance of the Condor Heroes (24 April)
- Flying Swords of Dragon Gate (2014) / Flying Swords of Dragon Gate (7 July)
- Half for the People, Half for Beauties / Empyrean Doctor (1 September)
- The Deer and the Cauldron / The Deer and the Cauldron (6 November)
- Reply 1997 (7 May)
- The 3rd Hospital (9 November)
- What Happens to My Family? (24 December)

2016

- The Cage of Love (15 January)
- The Female Assassins in the Palace (9 March)
- Legend of Ban Shu / Ban Shu Legend (11 May)
- The Eleventh Son (11 July)
- The Classic of Mountains and Seas (21 September)
- New Edge City Wanderer (5 December)

2017

- The Princess Weiyoung / The Princess Weiyoung (21 February)
- General and I / General and I (8 May)
- Fighter of the Destiny / Fighter of the Destiny (2 August)
- Princess of Lanling King (17 October)

2018

- The King's Woman / The King's Woman (5 January) (Drama suspended on 15 February 2018, 16 February 2018)
- Chronicle of a Taichi Master (16 March)
- Siege in Fog / Siege in Fog (14 May)
- The Great Shaolin (23 July, moved to Saturday 3 pm to 5 pm, 2 episodes back to back)
- Martial Universe / Martial Universe (3 September) (Drama repeated on 7 October 2021, Tuesday to Friday 12:30 am to 1:30 am)
- Ashes of Love / Ashes of Love (26 November) (Sponsored by Naturel oil) (Drama repeated on 8 March 2021, Monday 11:00 pm to Tuesday 12:30 am and Tuesday 11:00 pm to Wednesday 12:30 am)

2019

- Secret of the Three Kingdoms / Secret of the Three Kingdoms (26 February)
- The Legends (TV series) / Zhao Yao (14 May) (Drama repeated on 25 August 2020, Weekdays 10:30 am to 11:30 am) (Drama repeated on 5 January 2022, Wednesday 11:00 pm to Thursday 12:30 am and Thursday 11:00 pm to Friday 12:30 am) (Timeslot change from 6 April 2022 onwards to 7 April 2022, Thursday 12:00 am to 1:30 am and Friday 12:00 am to 1:30 am)
- The Destiny of White Snake / The Destiny Of White Snake (30 July) (Drama repeated on 16 November 2020, Monday 11:00 pm to Tuesday 12:30 am and Tuesday 11:00 pm to Wednesday 12:30 am) (Timeslot on 18 January, 25 January Monday 11:30 pm to Tuesday 1:00 am)
- Legend of the Phoenix / Legend of The Phoenix (23 October) (Drama repeated on 11 January 2022, Monday 11:00 pm to Tuesday 12:30 am and Tuesday 11:00 pm to Wednesday 12:30 am)
- Young Blood (TV series) / Young Blood (19 December) (Drama repeated on 28 December 2021, Weekdays 6:00 pm to 7:00 pm)

2020

- Ming Dynasty (2019 TV series) / Ming Dynasty (19 February) (Drama repeated on 28 September 2021, Monday 11:00 pm to Tuesday 12:30 am and Tuesday 11:00 pm to Wednesday 12:30 am) (Timeslot for first episode on 28 September 2021 from 11:50 pm to 12:30 am)
- Joy of Life (TV series) / Joy of Life (15 May) (Drama repeated on 18 March 2021, Wednesday 11:00 pm to Thursday 12:30 am and Thursday 11:00 pm to Friday 12:30 am) (Timeslot for first episode on 18 March 2021 from 11:50 pm to 12:30 am)
- Shimmering Fireworks (29 July) (Local drama series) (Drama repeated on 20 November 2021, Saturday 5:00 pm to 6:00 pm) (Timeslot on 19 December 2021 onwards, Weekends 5:00 pm to 6:00 pm)
- Princess Silver / Princess Silver (2 September) (Drama repeated on 9 June 2021, Wednesday 11:00 pm to Thursday 12:30 am and Thursday 11:00 pm to Friday 12:30 am)
- The Romance of Tiger and Rose / The Romance of Tiger and Rose (14 December) (Drama repeated on 23 November 2021, Weekdays 6:00 pm to 7:00 pm) (Drama repeated on 3 April 2022, Sunday 12:00 am to 2:00 am) (Timeslot change on 1 May 2022 onwards, Sunday 1:00 am to 2:30 am) (2 episodes back to back)

2021

- A Promise To Love (25 January) (Local drama series) (Drama repeated on 2 January 2022, Weekends 10:30 am to 11:30 am)
- Heroic Journey of Ne Zha (15 February) (Sponsored by GlaxoSmithKline Malaysia - Sensodyne) (*Last few episodes*) (Drama repeated on 8 April 2022, Friday 11:30 am to Saturday 1:30 am) (2 episodes back to back)
- Love in Between (TV series) / Love in Between (5 May) (Drama repeated on 5 April 2022, Monday 11:00 pm to Tuesday 12:30 am and Tuesday 11:00 pm to Wednesday 12:30 am)
- Weaving a Tale of Love (20 July)
- Love and Redemption / Love and Redemption (28 September) (Sponsored by Ginvera) (Episode 39 onwards/6 December)

2022

- Gong Xi Fa Cai (2022 Chinese New Year's local drama series) (Sponsored by GlaxoSmithKline Malaysia - Caltrate 600 Plus, Nivea Malaysia - Whitening Deep Serum Hokkaido Rose, 10 Super Vitamins & Skin Foods, etc...) (12 January 2022)
- Express Happiness (2022 Chinese New Year's local short drama series) (7 January 2022) (Friday and Saturday 9:00 pm to 9:30 pm) (Drama repeated on 26 March 2022, Saturday 11:00 pm to 11:30 pm and Saturday 11:30 pm to Sunday 12:00 am) (2 episodes back to back)
- The Long Ballad / The Long Ballad (7 February)
- Novoland: Pearl Eclipse / Novoland: Pearl Eclipse (3 May)

These series are produced by local and foreign Chinese TV studios; the timeslot is usually set at 9:30 pm to 10:30 pm from Monday to Thursday. Due to 8TV Mandarin News broadcast time changes, the timeslot was adjusted starting from the week of 8 June 2020 onwards, which is from 10:00 pm to 11:00 pm.

2018

- Dr. Chen's Diary (1 January) (Local drama series)
- Singing in the Spring (5 February) (Local drama series) (Final Episode on Chinese New Year's Eve, on 8:30 pm to 9:30 pm)
- All Under One Roof (19 February) (Local drama series)
- Doppelganger (TV series) / Doppelganger (3 April)
- Persona II (10 May) (Local drama series)
- Mightiest Mother-in-Law / Mightiest Mother-in-Law (14 June)
- My Sensei Nyonya (26 July) (Local drama series) (Drama repeated on 23 February 2021, Weekdays 6:00 pm to 7:00 pm)
- My Friends from Afar / My Friends-From-Afar (9 October)
- Super Mischievous MIL (21 November) (Local drama series) (Drama repeated on 7 April 2021, Weekdays 6:00 pm to 7:00 pm)
- Till We Meet Again (26 December) (From 1 January onwards: Weekdays)

2019

- Sweet Delicacy (24 January) (Local drama series)
- Hello From the Other Side (11 March)
- How Are You? (TV series) / How are you? (15 April)
- The Promise (13 May) (Local drama series)
- PTU (26 June) (Also available at ViuTV) (Drama repeated on 5 January 2021, Tuesday to Friday 12:30 am to 1:30 am) (Timeslot on 19 January, 26 January 1:00 am to 2:00 am)
- Turning Point 2 (19 August) (Local drama series) (sequel of The Turning Point) (Drama repeated on 26 June 2021, Weekends 9:30 am to 10:30 am)
- All Is Well (2 October) (1 episode consists of 2 parts, part 1 from Taiwan scene, part 2 from Singapore scene) (Drama repeated on 7 September 2020, Monday 11:00 pm to Tuesday 12:30 am and Tuesday 11:00 pm to Wednesday 12:30 am)
- Blessings 2 (11 December)

2020

- Singing In The Spring 2020 (15 January) (Local drama series) (Drama repeated on 30 January 2022, Monday 12:30 am to 2:00 am)
- After The Stars (3 February)
- Coolie (11 March) (Taiwan drama series) (Drama repeated on 24 May 2021, Weekdays 1:00 pm to 2:00 pm)
- I Court You (4 May) (Local drama series) (Drama repeated on 19 September 2021, Weekends 9:30 am to 10:30 am)
- While You Were Away (24 June)
- C.L.I.F. 5 (29 July) (Drama repeated on 5 June 2021) (Timeslot on 5 June from 4:00 pm to 5:00 pm), (Timeslot on 12 June onwards, 3:00 pm to 5:00 pm)
- My One In A Million (2 September) (Drama repeated on 14 August 2021) (Saturday 3:00 pm to 5:00 pm) (Timeslot on 14 August from 4:00 pm to 5:00 pm), (Timeslot on 21 August onwards, 3:00 pm to 5:00 pm)
- Daybreak (15 October)
- Dear Neighbours (19 November)
- The Good Fight (29 December)

2021

- Hello, My Little Fortune (8 January) (Local drama series) (Friday 9:00 pm to 9:30 pm) (Seasonal local drama series)
- Happy Prince (2 February) (Timeslot on 8 February 2021, 10:30 pm to 11:30 pm), (Timeslot on 9 February 2021 to 11 February 2021, return to normal hours), (Timeslot on 15 February 2021, return to normal hours), (Timeslot on 3 March 2021 onwards, drama broadcast Wednesday and Thursday at normal hours)
- Invisible Life (Wednesday and Thursday) (25 March) (Drama repeated on 13 April 2022, Tuesday 12:30 am to 1:30 am, Wednesday 12:30 am to 1:30 am, Thursday 1:30 am to 2:30 am, Friday 1:30 am to 2:30 am, Saturday 1:00 am to 2:00 am)
- You're My Destiny (Wednesday until Friday) (18 August) (Local drama series)
- My Best Friend's Story / My Best Friend's Story (16 September)

2022

- A Quest to Heal / A Quest To Heal (9 February) (Drama broadcast under new segment, Drama@10)

== Best Of The East K ==
Starting 1 April 2016, the Korean drama broadcast timeslot is broadcast separately at 9:30 pm, instead of 8:30 pm from Monday to Thursday, currently moved to the timeslot at 10:30 pm and Every Saturday and Sunday from 6:30 pm to 8:00 pm. Unless stated, the series here are all in original language. Since 2018, the Korean drama retain the broadcast timeslot at 10.30 pm to 11.30 pm. One of the Korean drama broadcast on Monday and Tuesday, while the other Korean drama broadcast on Wednesday and Thursday. Although rare, the day of broadcast may be adjust to broadcast either one of the two Korean drama when there is no new Korean drama available after the Korean drama series was finished, thus overwriting the current slot. The timeslot may also be used to broadcast other drama series (e.g.: Singapore and Thai drama series). Due to 8TV Mandarin News broadcast time changes, the timeslot was adjusted starting from the week of 8 June 2020 onwards, which is from 11:00 pm to 12:00 am. Korean drama series cease broadcasting from 7 July 2020, and completely migrated to TV3 on 10 August 2020 without Chinese subtitles. Korean drama series resume under Best Of The East K segment on 1 March 2021, where the broadcast timeslot 10:00 pm to 11:00 pm. Best Of The East K segment broadcast on Monday and Tuesday and may broadcast as an interim on Wednesday and Thursday at 10:00 pm to 11:00 pm timeslot. Starting from the week of 4 April 2022, Best Of The East K segment broadcast only on Monday and Tuesday, due to Drama@10 new segment occupy on Wednesday and Thursday.

Date listed for dramas are of debut date unless stated otherwise.

2016

- Pinocchio / Pinocchio (1 April) (Mandarin dub)
- Super Daddy Yeol / Super Daddy Yul (6 May) (Mandarin dub)
- Oh My Ghostess / Oh My Ghost (6 June) (Mandarin dub)
- Descendants of the Sun / Descendants Of The Sun (9 June)
- Oh My Venus / Oh My Venus (25 July) (Mandarin dub)
- Hey Ghost, Let's Fight / Hey Ghost, Let's Fight (25 August)
- Cheese in the Trap / Cheese in the Trap (12 September) (Mandarin dub) (Sponsored by KFC Malaysia)
- Another Miss Oh / Another Oh Hae-young (1 November)
- Love in the Moonlight / Love in the Moonlight (10 November)

2017

- The K2 / The K2 (2 January)
- Cinderella and Four Knights / Cinderella and Four Knights (3 February)
- Woman with a Suitcase / Women with a Suitcase (22 February)
- Tomorrow With You / Tomorrow With You (21 April)
- Hwarang: The Poet Warrior Youth / Hwarang: The Poet Warrior Youth (18 April)
- Chicago Typewriter / Chicago Typewriter (14 June)
- Introverted Boss / Introverted Boss (6 July)
- Circle: Two Worlds Connected / Circle (21 August)
- Goblin / Goblin (2 October)
- Revolutionary Love / Revolutionary Love (13 November)
- Fight for My Way / Fight For My Way (15 November)
- Andante / Andante (24 September)

2018

- Criminal Minds (South Korea) / Criminal Minds (South Korea) (29 January)
- Cross / Cross (20 March)
- A Poem a Day / A Poem A Day (26 April) (rescheduled for Saturday on 12 May)
- Suits / Suits (7 May)
- Lawless Lawyer / Lawless Layer (16 May)
- Strong Girl Bong-soon / Strong Woman Do Bong-soon (2 July)
- A Korean Odyssey / A Korean Odyssey (2 August)
- 100 Days My Prince / 100 Days My Prince (18 September)
- Mama Fairy and the Woodcutter / Tale of Fairy (22 November)
- Encounter / Encounter (10 December)

2019

- The Crowned Clown / The Crowned Clown (20 February)
- He Is Psychometric / He Is Psychometric (18 March)
- The Light in Your Eyes (TV series) / Dazzling (1 May)
- What's Wrong with Secretary Kim / What's Wrong with Secretary Kim (10 June)
- Angel's Last Mission: Love / Angel's Last Mission: Love (3 July)
- At Eighteen / At Eighteen (2 September)
- Flower Crew: Joseon Marriage Agency / Flower Crew: Joseon Marriage Agency (26 November)

2020

- Touch Your Heart / Touch Your Heart (24 February)
- A Piece of Your Mind / A Piece of Your Mind (12 May)

2021

- Dr. Romantic 2 / Dr. Romantic 2 (1 March) (Monday and Tuesday) (Return of Korean drama series under Best Of The East K segment) (Sponsored by Abbott Laboratories - Similac Malaysia - Gain Plus Gold)
- Find Me in Your Memory / Find Me in Your Memory (17 May) (Sponsored by Abbott Laboratories - Similac Malaysia - Gain Plus Gold)
- The World of the Married / The World of the Married (2 August) (Sponsored by Abbott Laboratories - Similac Malaysia - Gain Plus Gold)
- Special Labor Inspector / Special Labor Inspector Mr.Jo (18 October) (Sponsored by Abbott Laboratories - Similac Malaysia - Gain Plus Gold)

2022

- Police University / Police University (3 January) (Sponsored by GlaxoSmithKline Malaysia - Sensodyne)
- Alice (South Korean TV series) / Alice (29 March) (Drama suspended on 2 May 2022 and 3 May 2022 for movies due to seasonal Hari Raya Aidilfitri festival) (Sponsored by Abbott Laboratories - Similac Malaysia - Gain Plus Gold)

== Best Of The East T ==
These series are produced by Thailand, it has replace English slot on Thursday in 2017. The segment target audience are Malay viewers and the timeslot given is after 8TV Express. Starting 23 February 2018, the segment timeslot had been changed to Friday at 11.30 pm and available on original Thai language. Due to 8TV Mandarin News broadcast time changes, the timeslot was adjusted starting from the week of 8 June 2020 onwards, which is from 11:00 pm to 12:00 pm.

- Flower Ring (Original language)
- Game Maya (Dubbed in Mandarin)
- You Are My Destiny / Fated To Love You (Dubbed in Mandarin)

2018

- I See You (24 August) (Original language)
- Pure Intention (1 December) (Original language)

2020

- In Time with You (26 February) (Original language) (Drama repeated on 19 October 2020, Tuesday to Friday 12:30 am to 1:30 am) (Drama repeated on 6 November 2021, Saturday 12:30 am to 1:30 am) (2 episodes back to back)
- My Ambulance (20 May) (Original language) (Drama repeated on 30 November 2020, Tuesday to Friday 12:30 am to 1:30 am) (Drama repeated on 12 February 2022, Saturday 12:30 am to 2:30 am) (2 episodes back to back)

2021

- My Love From Another Star (Original language) (moved to Awesome TV)

== Drama@10 ==
This is a new segment from 6 April 2022 onwards, which broadcast series from Singapore. Drama broadcast are 2 episodes back to back. The drama timeslot for these segment is set at Wednesday 10:00 pm to Thursday 12:00 am and Thursday 10:00 pm to Friday 12:00 am.

2022

- A Quest to Heal / A Quest To Heal (9 February)
- My Star Bride (5 May)

== Dramedy ==
This segment which begin from 14 May 2019 onwards, broadcast local and international drama series (mainly from China and Singapore studios). The drama timeslot for these segment is set at Weekdays 6:00 pm to 7:00 pm.

2019

- Babies On Board (14 May)
- Say Cheese (TV series) (13 June)
- Pushing Hands (11 July)
- Cosmetology High (16 September)
- Heart to Heart (29 October)
- How Are You? (3 December)

2020

- Walk With Me (30 January)
- Rebirth of Shopping Addict (5 March)
- Blessings 2 (5 May) (Repeated drama)
- Wait in Beijing (3 June) (Weekdays 6:00 pm to 7:00 pm) (Drama suspended on 3 August 2020 due to Oppo Reno 4 Promotion Conference) (Drama repeated on 25 May 2021, Tuesday to Friday 12:30 am to 1:30 am)

2021

- My Sensei Nyonya (23 February) (Local drama series)
- Super Mischievous MIL (7 April) (Local drama series)
- The Centimeter of Love (5 May) (Weekdays 6:00 pm to 7:00 pm) (Drama repeated on 20 January 2022, Tuesday to Friday 12:30 am to 1:30 am) (Timeslot on 7 April 2022 and 8 April 2022, Thursday 1:30 am to 2:30 am and Friday 1:30 am to 2:30 am, Timeslot on 9 April 2022, Saturday 1:00 am to 2:00 am, Timeslot on 12 April 2022 (Final episode), Tuesday 12:30 am to 1:30 am)
- Loving You (6 July) (Weekdays 6:00 pm to 7:00 pm)
- Palace: the Lock Heart Jade / Palace (3 August) (Drama repeated on 27 February 2022, Weekends 9:30 am to 10:30 am)
- Love Yunge from the Desert / Love Yunge from the Desert (21 September)
- The Romance of Tiger and Rose / The Romance of Tiger and Rose (23 November) (Drama repeated on 3 April 2022, Sunday 12:00 am to 2:00 am) (Timeslot change on 1 May 2022 onwards, Sunday 1:00 am to 2:30 am) (2 episodes back to back)
- Young Blood (TV series) / Young Blood (28 December)

2022

- My Guardian Angels (7 March)
- Hand In Hand (18 April)

== Drama O'Clock (Series imported from Singapore) ==
This segment which begin from 20 November 2021 onwards, broadcast drama series from Singapore. The drama timeslot for these segment is set at Weekends 3:00 pm to 5:00 pm.

2021

- Old Is Gold (20 November 2021) (Saturday 3:00 pm to 5:00 pm) (4 episodes back to back) (Repeat broadcast on 4 April 2022, 8:00 am to 8:30 am)

== Hito Idol Theatre (Korean and Taiwanese drama series) ==
These are programmes made by Korean and Taiwanese studios. The drama timeslot for these segment is set at Saturday 6:30 pm to 8:00 pm.

- Apple in Your Eye
- Calling For Love
- Down with Love
- Dream High
- Lightning
- Love Rain
- Mary Stayed Out All Night
- Momo Love
- Pandamen
- Playful Kiss
- Queen In-hyun's Man
- Skip Beat!
- Sunny Girl
- Tamra, the Island
- The King 2 Hearts (Taiwanese Mandarin dub)
- The Strongest K-Pop Survival
- Worlds Within
- ToGetHer
- Volleyball Lover
- You Coloured My World

2014

- That Winter, the Wind Blows (8 November)

2015

- Monstar (14 March)
- I Can Hear Your Voice (20 June)
- Flower Boys Next Door (3 September)
- Blade Man (20 October)

2016

- Hi! School – Love On / Hi! School – Love On (27 February)
- Reply 1988 / Reply 1988 (16 July)

2017

- Promise of Migratory Birds (4 February) (Saturday 6:00 pm to 8:00 pm) (2 Episodes back to back.)
- The Gentlemen of Wolgyesu Tailor Shop / The Gentlemen of Wolgyesu Tailor Shop (22 April) (Timeslot broadcast on 12 May onwards, broadcast 7:00 pm to 8:00 pm)

2018

- To Love To Heal (22 April) (Sunday 4:00 pm to 5:00 pm)
- Excellent Investor (1 July) (Saturday and Sunday 3:00 pm to 5:00 pm) (Timeslot broadcast on 1 July onwards, 4:00 pm to 5:00 pm) (Timeslot broadcast on 2 September onwards, 3:00 pm to 5:00 pm) (Drama suspended on 16 September 2018 due to Malaysia Day programmes.) (Drama finished on 23 September) (Drama repeated on 30 December 2020, Wednesday 11:00 pm to Thursday 12:30 am and Thursday 11:00 pm to Friday 12:30 am)
- Meet In Youth Love In Foods (30 September) (Sunday 3:00 pm to 5:00 pm) (2 episodes back to back) (Timeslot broadcast on 20 October 2018 onwards, broadcast on Weekends) (Drama repeated on 7 May 2020)

== International Programmes ==
These programmes were broadcast during the 8TV Urban period which is usually at night, especially midnight or early in the morning. Although the last remaining English programme concluded its broadcast on 9 February 2018, the English programmes were eventually migrated on 5 March 2018 to NTV7.

- 10 Things I Hate About You
- The 100
- 2 Broke Girls
- 21 Jump Street
- 24
- 8 Simple Rules
- Action Zone
- Alias
- American Chopper
- American Idol (Reality Television - Sing Talent Search Competition Show)
- America's Got Talent (Reality Television - Talent Search Competition Show)
- America's Next Top Model (Reality Television - Modelling Talent Search Competition Show)
- The Apprentice (Reality Television - Job Search Competition Show)
- Arrested Development
- Ashley Banjo's Secret Street Crew
- The Bachelor (Reality Television - Dating Based Competition Show)
- The Bachelorette (Reality Television - Dating Based Competition Show)
- Battleground Earth
- Battlestar Galactica
- Baywatch
- The Biggest Loser
- Total Blackout
- Boys Nxt Door (Philippine TV series)
- The Buried Life
- Burn Notice
- Brooklyn Nine-Nine
- Caramba!
- The Carrie Diaries
- Catfish: The TV Show
- The Colony
- Commander in Chief
- Criminal Minds
  - Criminal Minds: Beyond Borders
- CSI: Crime Scene Investigation
  - CSI: NY
- Castle (Also aired on Fox)
- Cupid
- Desperate Housewives
- Dirty Sexy Money (season 1, season 2 is shown on NTV7)
- Distraction
- Don't Trust the B— in Apartment 23
- Eve
- Everybody Hates Chris
- Extreme Makeover
- Fastlane
- Flash Prank
- Friends (moved from NTV7, but returned to NTV7 in the final season)
- Ghost Whisperer
- Gilmore Girls (season 2 onwards)
- The Goldbergs
- Goodwin Games
- Gossip Girl
- Hannah Montana
- Hero to Zero
- Hole in the Wall
- I Survived a Japanese Game Show (Reality Television - Game Show)
- The Incredible Hulk
- Invasion
- iZombie
- Jamie Oliver's Food Revolution
- Jane by Design
- The Janice Dickinson Modeling Agency (Reality Television - Modelling Talent Search Competition Show)
- Joey
- Kenny vs. Spenny
- Kevin Hill
- Killer Karaoke
- Kimora: Life in the Fab Lane (Reality Television)
- King of the Nerds
- Las Vegas
- LAX
- Less than Perfect
- Lost
- Make Me a Supermodel (Reality Television - Modelling Talent Search Competition Show)
- Making the Band
- Mixology
- Mobbed
- My Babysitter's a Vampire
- My Big Fat Obnoxious Boss
- Navy 6
- NCIS
  - NCIS: Los Angeles
- Nip/Tuck
- Nitro Circus
- The O.C.
- Oblivious
- Oliver Twist
- Once Upon a Time (last broadcast on 9 February 2018)
- One Tree Hill
- Overhaulin' (Reality Television)
- Perception
- Pretty Little Liars
- Prison Break
- Paris Hilton's My New BFF
- Project Accessory
- Project Runway (Reality Television - Fashion Design Talent Search Competition Show)
- Punk'd
- Pushing Daisies
- Queer Eye For the Straight Guy
- Reaper
- The Restaurant
- Revenge
- Cats on the Roof
- Scrubs
- Selena Gomez
- South Park (moved from TV9, but returned to TV9 in February 2010)
- The Simple Life
- So You Think You Can Dance (Reality Television - Dance Talent Search Competition Show)
- Stacked
- The Swan
- Switched at Birth
- Terminator: The Sarah Connor Chronicles
- The Tomorrow People
- TV Champion
- Twisted
- Ugly Betty (the final season was not broadcast)
- Undateable
- The Vampire Diaries
- Vanished
- What If
- Who Wants to Be a Superhero?
- Wipeout USA (Reality Television - Game Show)
- Will & Grace
- The X Factor (Reality Television - Sing Talent Search Competition Show)
- Zero Hour

== Live and Delayed Telecasts ==
These programmes were broadcast live or delayed, they are mainly local and international programmes. These programmes consists of daily news, talkshows, sports, musical/entertainment awards, festive celebration, latest happenings in the entertainment industry and many more.

2004

- 8 E-News (8 January 2004 – Present) (Daily broadcast on Weekdays)
- 8TV Mandarin News (8 January - present) (Daily broadcast)
- The 8TV Quickie (8 January - 31 March 2016) (Daily broadcast) (replaced by 8TV Express)
- UEFA Euro 2004 (13 June to 5 July) (Repeat Matches) (Reality Television)

2009

- Shout! Awards (17 July) (Friday 8:30 pm to 11:30 pm) (1st Edition) (Reality Television - Entertainment Awards Show)

2010

- Shout! Awards (20 November) (Saturday 8:30 pm onwards) (2nd Edition) (Reality Television - Entertainment Awards Show)

2011

- Mnet Asian Music Awards (29 November) (Tuesday 9:30 pm to Wednesday 1:30 am) (Reality Television - Music Awards Show)

2012

- Shout! Awards (23 November) (Friday 8:30 pm onwards) (3rd Edition) (Reality Television - Entertainment Awards Show)

2013

- Shout! Awards (9 November) (Saturday 8:30 pm onwards) (4th Edition) (Reality Television - Entertainment Awards Show)

2014

- Mnet Asian Music Awards (3 December) (Delayed telecast from Wednesday 9:30 pm to Thursday 1:30 am) (Reality Television - Music Awards Show)

2015

- CCTV New Year's Gala delayed telecast) (CCTV-4 Asia version) (Reality Television)
- Mnet Asian Music Awards (2 December) (Live from Wednesday 5:00 pm to 7:00 pm for Red Carpet Ceremony and 7:00 pm to 10:30 pm for Awards Show Ceremony via Tonton website) (Delayed telecast from Wednesday 10:00 pm to Thursday 1:30 am) (Reality Television - Music Awards Show)

2018

- Living Delight (1 January - present) (Weekdays 2:00 pm to 3:00 pm) (Programme migrated from NTV7) (Broadcast suspended on 4 April 2022 for The 2022 64th Annual Grammy Awards)
- 8TV Global Watch (30 April - 31 December 2019) (Reality Television - Current Affairs) (Last broadcast by NTV7 on 2 March 2018 before migrating to 8TV)

2020

- Money Matters (4 September) (Sponsored by Abbott Laboratories - Ensure Malaysia - Ensure Gold) (Reality Television - Current Affairs)

2021

- Shopee Fortune Box (18 January - 8 February) (Reality Television)
- Money Matters (Season Two) (5 March) (Reality Television - Current Affairs)
- Miss Malaysia Tourism Pageant 2021 (1 May) (Reality Television)
- Money Matters (Season Three) (20 August) (Reality Television - Current Affairs)
- Pre-Budget Talk Show (29 October) (Reality Television)
- Budget 2022 (29 October) (Reality Television)
- Miss Tourism International 2021/22 (19 December) (Reality Television)

2022

- 8TV 18th Anniversary Bonanza (8 January) (Saturday 9:30 pm to 11:30 pm) (Sponsored by Abbott Laboratories - Ensure Malaysia - Ensure Gold) (Reality Television)
- CCTV Spring Festival Gala 2022 (31 January) (Monday 11:00 pm to Tuesday 2:00 am) delayed telecast (Reality Television)
- 2022 JSBC Lantern Festival Gala (15 February) (Tuesday 11:00 pm to Wednesday 12:30 am) delayed telecast (Reality Television)
- Shall We Talk (1 April) (Friday 10:30 pm to 11:30 pm) (Reality Television - Current Affairs) (Repeat broadcast on 5 April 2022, Tuesday 7:00 am to 8:00 am)
- The 2022 64th Annual Grammy Awards (4 April) (Live from Monday 8:00 am onwards via Tonton website) (Delayed telecast from Monday 1:00 pm to 3:30 pm) (Reality Television - Music Awards Show)
- 8TV Morning Express (8 April) (Weekdays 9:30 am to 9:45 am)

2025

- Starfluencer Awards (8 August) (Friday 9:00 pm to 12:00 am) (Reality Television)

== Online Programming ==
- Eight FM @ 8TV (Broadcast as 8FM since 3 August 2021 after rebranding exercise announced on the previous day) (Formerly broadcast as One FM since 10 May 2021) (Monday 2:00 am to 7:00 am) (Tuesday to Friday 1:30 am to 7:00 am) (Saturday and Sunday 2:30 am to 7:00 am) (Timeslot change from 7 April 2022 onwards, Monday 2:00 am to 7:00 am, Tuesday and Wednesday 1:30 am to 7:00 am, Thursday and Friday 2:30 am to 7:00 am, Weekends 2:00 am to 7:00 am) (Timeslot change from 1 June 2023 onwards, Everyday 12:00 midnight to 7:00 am)
