= Project Runway Malaysia season 2 =

Season 2 of Project Runway Malaysia featured 15 fashion designers from Malaysia competing to be the best designer.

The judges for the first season were Bernie Chan, Datuk Bernard Chandran, Asiah Mion (editor EH! Magazine), Seema Visamanathan (editor Female Magazine), Wirda Adnan (Chief Editor, Glam Magazine) and Aster Lim (Managing Editor, Female, Marie Claire, Men's Health and Seventeen magazines). There are also guest judges through the season.

== The contestants ==
Project Runway Malaysia Contestants (each with their episode of elimination and its original broadcast date) (number after name is age)
Season 2
Hariz Isham, 23	Winner
Muhd Ahman Zahid, 21	Runner-up
Michelle Lim, 32	2nd Runner-up
Recap	Ep 13
Syafiqah Buang, 26	Ep 12
Dazwan Hisham, 25	Ep 11
Kerienxi Wee, 20	Ep 10
Sumathy a/p Ramli, 36	Ep 9
Zika Lee, 28	Ep 8
John Wing, 35	Ep 7
Mohd Haziz, 28	Ep 6
Natasha Everett, 28	Ep 5
Wan Shima, 24	Ep 4
Daniel Chen, 25	Ep 3
Surresh a/l Hari, 20	Ep 2
Danny Low, 26	Ep 1
