= Project Runway Malaysia season 1 =

Season of television series

Season 1 of Project Runway Malaysia featured 15 designers from various parts of the country competing to be the best designer. Judges for the first season were Bernie Chan, Datuk Bernard Chandran, Asiah Mion (editor EH! Magazine), Seema Visamanathan (editor Female Magazine), Wirda Adnan (Chief Editor, Glam Magazine) and Aster Lim (Managing Editor, Female, Marie Claire, Men's Health and Seventeen magazines). There are also guest judges through the season.

== The contestants ==
Name	Age	Placement
Anizam Yusof	24	15th
Hanizam Abd Wahab	40	14th
Jenny Yap	25	13th
Mohd Khairi	24	12th
Nurita Harith	24	11th
Mumtaz Bibi Abd Rahman	27	10th
Jezmine Zaidan	23	9th
Allison Chong	29	8th
Danny Kok	24	7th
Zeri Zamri	23	6th
Alwyn Chua	22	5th
Mohd Fitri Zainal Abidin	28	4th
Muhammad Hatta Bin Dolmat	24	3rd
Alexandrea Yeo	21	Runner-up
Felix Chin	34	Winner

=== Challenge ===
Elimination Chart
Designers	1	2	3	4	5	6	7	8	9	10	11	12	14	Eliminated Episode
Felix	IN	WIN	IN	IN	IN	WIN	IN	IN	IN	IN	LOW	LOW	WINNER	14 - Finale
Alexandrea	IN	IN	WIN	IN	IN	IN	IN	IN	IN	WIN	IN	WIN	RUNNER UP	14 - Finale
Hatta	IN	IN	IN	IN	IN	IN	WIN	IN	LOW	IN	IN	IN	3RD PLACE	14 - Finale
Fitri	IN	IN	IN	IN	IN	IN	LOW	LOW	WIN	IN	WIN	OUT		12 - Inspiration
Alwyn	IN	IN	IN	IN	WIN	IN	IN	WIN	IN	IN	OUT			11 - Makeover
Zeri	IN	IN	IN	IN	IN	IN	IN	IN	IN	OUT				10 - Athletic
Danny	IN	IN	IN	WIN	IN	LOW	IN	IN	OUT					9 - 2050 Fashion
Allison	IN	IN	IN	IN	IN	IN	IN	OUT						8 - Makeover
Jezmine	IN	IN	IN	LOW	IN	IN	OUT							7 - Jaclyn Victor
Mumtaz	IN	IN	LOW	IN	LOW	OUT								6 - PARKSON KLCC.
Nurita	WIN	IN	IN	IN	OUT									5 - National Service Malaysia
Khairi	IN	IN	IN	OUT										4 - Versatile
Jenny	IN	IN	OUT											3 - The Red Carpet
Hanizam	IN	OUT												2 - Funky Street Wear
Anizam	OUT													1 - Fabric

The designer won Project Runway Malaysia.
The designer won that challenge.
The designer was in the bottom two, but was not eliminated.
The designer lost and was eliminated from the competition.

== Episodes ==
=== Episode 1 ===
Original airdate: 3 August 2007

The 15 contestants were given their first task: each was given only RM50 and 4m of fabric and also assigned with a model, as well as 1 hour to prepare the models with their respective designers' clothes for their first catwalk in the competition. At the elimination session, eight of the contestants were called out as they are either placed the very top or the very bottom by the judges. Anizam Yusof was the first to leave the competition.

- Challenge won by: Nurita Harith
- Eliminated: Anizam Yusof

=== Episode 2 ===
Original airdate: 10 August 2007

The 14 remaining contestants were given their second task. Each designer was given RM70 and 30 minutes to search for usable items from a supermarket. The designers then had to use the items to create a fashion creation with the theme "Funky Street Wear". The winner of this task would receive immunity and be safe from elimination at the next judging. Felix won the task and immunity while Hanizam lost.

- Challenge won by: Felix Chin
- Eliminated: Hanizam Abd Wahab

=== Episode 3 ===
Original airdate: 17 August 2007

Bernie told the remaining 13 contestants of their next task which was to come up with a dress that can be worn on the red carpet. In the workroom, Peter Lum introduced the designers to their "client", Nurul, a local celebrity. Nurul then told the designers her style and what materials and colours they may use. They were then given 30 minutes and RM250 to purchase their materials. Ultimately, Alexandrea won the challenge but was not given immunity while Jenny was declared out of the running.

- Judges: Datuk Bernard Chandran, Seema Visamanathan, Nurul, Bernie Chan
- Challenge won by: Alexandrea Yeo
- Eliminated: Jenny Yap
- Bottom two: Jenny, Mumtaz

=== Episode 4 ===
Original airdate: 24 August 2007

The designers have to create a versatile dress that can be worn both during the day and night. Batik and traditional motifs become the main source of inspiration for the designers, among others.

- Judges: Datuk Bernard Chandran, Faisol Abdullah, Wirda Adnan, Bernie Chan
- Challenge won by: Danny Kok
- Eliminated: Mohd Khairi
- Bottom two: Khairi, Jezmine

=== Episode 5 ===
Original airdate: 31 August 2007

The designers have to design the uniform for the National Service Malaysia. The designers visit PLKN Princess Haliza Camp, Sepang to have a physical test. Then the designers have to survey some of the trainees to see what's the problem of the uniform. The designers were given 20 minutes and RM50 to purchase fabric to create their uniforms. The fabric colors they were allowed to choose from were blue, black and white. Fitri was rushed to the clinic for a medical check-up due to his asthmatic problem. Nurita's design wasn't complete and was noticed by the judges during the judging panel.

- Judges: Edmundser, Wirda Adnan, Aster Lim, Bernie Chan
- Challenge won by: Alwyn Chua
- Eliminated: Nurita Harith
- Bottom two: Nurita, Mumtaz

=== Episode 6 ===
Original airdate: 7 September 2007

The designers have to design beach wear that is very commercial value for PARKSON KLCC. The designers were introduced to Rita Shum, Fashion Director of PARKSON KLCC. Then they were given RM70 to buy fabric for the design. During panel, the judges said that Danny's design is out of title and Mumtaz's design was not up-to-date.

- Judges: Edmundser, Aster Lim, Rita Shum, Bernie Chan
- Challenge won by: Felix Chin
- Eliminated: Mumtaz Rahman
- Bottom two: Mumtaz, Danny

=== Episode 7 ===
Original airdate: 14 September 2007

The designers have to design an outfit for Malaysian singer, Jaclyn Victor for her next performance. First the designers have to show their design for her individually. This week, the designers have to work in group. Then, Jaclyn will choose 3 of the best as the leader, and the leaders have to handpicked their group members. The groups are:

Group leader	Group member
Alwyn	Alexandrea and Danny
Fitri	Allison and Jezmine
Hatta	Zeri and Felix

Later, they were given RM100 and 30mins to shop for fabric. During panel, the judges think that Fitri's design is too simple and not suitable for performance. Jezmine was eliminated although it's not her design but because she wasn't independent enough.

- Judges: Sonny San, Asiah Mion, Jaclyn Victor, Bernie Chan
- Challenge won by: Hatta Dolmat
- Eliminated: Jezmine Zaidan
- Bottom two: Jezmine, Fitri

=== Episode 8 ===
Original airdate: 21 September 2007

The theme of the week is to design a makeover for their fellow designers to transform who they are right now. The designers have to design for each other, 2 designers in a group. The groups are:

Group	Designers
1	Felix and Alexandrea
2	Alwyn and Hatta
3	Fitri and Zeri
4	Danny and Allison

Unlike last week, they do not have a leader in the group. Later, they were given 15 minutes to sketch for their partners and was given RM60 and 30 minutes to buy fabric.

While they were working in the studio, Peter Lum came and brought them for dinner in a restaurant at Bangsar, Kuala Lumpur. When they reached there, the designers meet Bernie Chan and Maya Karin. She is a singer, actor and VJ. Karin is also the ambassador for L'Oréal Paris. After dinner, Bernie teaches the designers how to catwalk, as they are modeling for each other's design. The designers have to continue their work the next day for it is too late.

Before the fashion show begins, the designers meet Monica Lee, makeup artist of L'Oréal Paris. She gives the designers a makeover and makeup to suit their design.

During panel, the judges do not see any effort and transformation in Danny in Allison's design. And Fitri's design is a bad transformation in Zery, and it makes Zery looks older.

- Judges: Redzuan Radzwill, Asiah Mion, Joe Spinelli, Bernie Chan
- Challenge won by: Alwyn Chua
- Eliminated: Allison Chong
- Bottom two: Allison, Fitri

=== Episode 9 ===
Original airdate: 28 September 2007

- Challenge won by: Mohd Fitri Zainal Abidin
- Eliminated: Danny Kok
- Bottom two: Hatta, Danny

=== Episode 10 ===
Original airdate: 5 October 2007

The contestants are told to create a "2050 fashion" theme collection as a group.

- Challenge won by: Alexandrea Yeo
- Eliminated: Zeri Zamry
- Bottom two: None

=== Episode 11 ===
Original airdate: 12 October 2007

The contestants are taken to the athletic gyms, and the task to create the outfit

- Challenge won by: Mohd Fitri Zainal Abidin
- Eliminated: Alwyn Chua
- Bottom two: Alwyn, Felix

=== Episode 12 ===
Original airdate: 19 October 2007

All four aspiring designers are brought to Datuk Bernard Chandran's boutique and later, 4 set of brand new Nokia Prism 7500 are given for their task. "Inspiration" was the theme for this week. The designers have to wander around KL and get some shots as the "inspiration" for their design.

Fitri came up with a KL Tower shot, Alexandra with Under construction building shot, Hatta with local newspapers headline shot while Felix came up with a pattern shot from an RM10 Ladies Nite Gown.

- Judges: Datuk Bernard Chandran, Asiah Mion, Bernie Chan
- Challenge won by: Alexandrea Yeo
- Eliminated: Mohd Fitri Zainal Abidin
- Bottom two: Mohd Fitri Zainal Abidin, Felix
