= Malaysian Dreamgirl =

- Genre: Reality show
- Created by: Jerad Solomon
- Presented by: Sazzy Falak (1); Elaine Daly (2)
- Starring: Elaine Daly; Lim Jimmy; Andrew Tan (2); Julie Yong (2); Sazzy Falak (1); Kenny Sia (1)
- Country of origin: Malaysia
- Original languages: English; Malay; Chinese
- No. of seasons: 2
- No. of episodes: 42

Production
- Producer: Jared Solomon
- Running time: 30-45 minutes
- Production company: Capxion Media

Original release
- Network: NTV7 (1); TV3 (2)
- Release: March 6, 2008 – May 21, 2009

Malaysian Dreamgirl (often abbreviated to MDG) was an online reality television show in which a number of young women competed for the title of Malaysian Dreamgirl and a chance to start their career in the modeling industry. The show lasted for only 2 seasons in a period of only 2 years, with double episodes per week in Thursday and Saturday each season.

The show was created by Jared Solomon, CEO of Capxion Media. Sazzy Falak became the host season 1 and Elaine Daly later took over as host for season 2. The first season premiered in March 2008 and was added into the Malaysia Book of Records as Malaysia's First Online Reality Model Search.

== Show format ==
Each season of Malaysian Dreamgirl starts with a nationwide auditions to find 12 contestants to competed. The participants will have to outshine each other on the catwalk fashion shows, photo shoots, self-make up and self-styling assignments whilst living together for 10 weeks. Makeovers are administered to contestants early in the season.

Each 2 episode of Malaysian Dreamgirl covers the events of roughly a week of real time, and features a fashion challenge or photo shoot and the elimination of one or more contestants. Usually, on the Saturdays episodes, means that the starting of each new week, except for Episode 2, it was an Audition episode; and on Thursdays episode means that one contestant is going to be eliminated, except for Episode 1 and 3, because Episode 1 is an Audition episode, as for Episode 3, voting are not opened yet, as for Episode 5, 2 girls were eliminated. Elimination of one or more contestants are based on publics' votes.

As of season 1, the experts includes model, actress & former beauty queen Elaine Daly, celebrity blogger Kenny Sia, and fashion stylist Lim Jimmy. For season 2, the experts includes Elaine Daly, Lim Jimmy, founder of the beauty product "Beautilicous" Julie Wong, and Andrew Tan, founder of Andrews Model. Each episode is usually associated with a theme in the world of modeling, such as dealing with the press in interviews or appearing in a runway show.

An episode usually begins with the contestants receiving training in an area concurrent with the week's theme. For example, contestants may get coached in runway walking, improvisational acting, or applying make-up to suit various occasions. A related challenge soon follows, such as a mock runway show or interview, and a winner is chosen by a judge. She receives some prize, such as clothing, portfolio expanding, a night out, or an advantage at the next photo shoot, and she is usually allowed to share the benefits with a certain number of other contestants of her choice.

The next segment is a photo shoot, and each contestant's performance will reflect heavily on her judging for that week. Each season features photo shoots such as lingerie shots or beauty shots.

The final segment of each odd number episode is judging. Each contestant's photo is then shown and evaluated by the judging panel. The elimination process is ceremonious, as least three contestants will be announced as "the bottom", and each one will received critiques before revealing which contestants has been eliminated. However, there have been exceptions as a non-elimination or the original eliminee was saved by another contestant's decision to quit.

== Seasons ==
Cycle	Premiere date	Winner	Runner-up	Other contestants in order of elimination	Number of contestants
1	6 March 2008	Tey Cindy	Adeline Lee	Jean Fong (quit), Alison Victor & Natasha Boudville, Valerie Ebal, Eyna Haszalina, Fiqa Chong, Jay Loganathan & Nadia Johary & Ringo Tan, Hanis Zalikha	12
2	28 February 2009	Juanita Francis	Pinky Liew	Rajvin Kaur (quit), Acha Hafsah & Maya Hashim, Liana Fariai, Farah Zulkefli, Shasya Ahmad, Denezia Beins, Natasha Carey, Ming Chiang, Dawn Lim	12

== Season 1 ==
The first season of Malaysian Dreamgirl aired on 6 March to 3 May 2008, with the auditions start in 16 & 17 February 2008. Sazzy Falak was the host of the show and join with her will be 3 mentors are: model & actress Elaine Daly, celebrity blogger Kenny Sia and fashion stylist Jimmy Lim. The show aired 2 episodes on Thursday & Saturday per week, with each voting week runs from Tuesday to the next Monday, and elimination will be based on the SMS vote count for the particular week only.

This season contained 18 episodes, followed 12 girls will be spend 10 weeks competed in photoshoots and challenges to convince the viewers vote for them. At least one contestant would be eliminated each week based on the lowest SMS voting until 3 finalist were chosen, at which a winner was chosen on the live finale catwalk show at 1 Utama on 29 April 2008.

Among with the prizes include: a one-year contract with Capxion Media, an exclusive cover spread and 6-page editorial in Newman magazine, a brand new Nissan Latio, a cash prize of RM10,000 from AmBank NexG PrePaid Mastercard and a gift packages from Wella, Escada Fragrances, Bebe Stores & Nose Footwear with a total value of RM5,500.

The winner of this season was 21-year-old Tey Cindy from Johor.

=== Contestants ===
(ages stated are at time of contest)

Contestant	Nickname	Age	Height	Hometown	Finish	Place
Fong Siew Jean	Jean	20	1.72 m (5 ft 7 1/2 in)	Kuala Lumpur	Episode 5	12 (quit)
Alison Joan Victor	Alison	27	1.70 m (5 ft 7 in)	Selangor	Episode 5	11–10
Natasha Rosa Boudville	Natasha	18	1.67 m (5 ft 5 1/2 in)	Kuala Lumpur	Episode 5	11–10
Valerie Vanessa Ebal Anus	Valerie	21	1.63 m (5 ft 4 in)	Sabah	Episode 7	9
Wan Haszalina	Eyna	25	1.69 m (5 ft 6 1/2 in)	Selangor	Episode 9	8
Nur Afiqah Liyana Binti Hazrin Chong	Fiqa	18	1.70 m (5 ft 7 in)	Selangor	Episode 11	7
Aberami Jaishana Loganathan	Jay	25	1.75 m (5 ft 9 in)	Kuala Lumpur	Episode 15	6–4
Nurul Nadiah S. Johary	Nadia	19	1.62 m (5 ft 4 in)	Kuala Lumpur	Episode 15	6–4
Ringo Tan Hui Ling	Ringo	23	1.62 m (5 ft 4 in)	Negeri Sembilan	Episode 15	6–4
Hanis Zalikha binti Zainal Rashid	Hanis	18	1.70 m (5 ft 7 in)	Selangor	Episode 17	3
Adeline Lee Ying Ying	Adeline	20	1.73 m (5 ft 8 in)	Negeri Sembilan	Episode 17	2
Tey Cindy	Cindy	21	1.67 m (5 ft 5 1/2 in)	Johor	Episode 17	1

=== Results table ===
Place	Model	Episodes							
Place	Model	2	5	7	9	11	13	15	17
1	Cindy	SAFE	LOW	LOW	SAFE	SAFE	SAFE	SAFE	WINNER
2	Adeline	SAFE	SAFE	SAFE	SAFE	LOW	LOW	SAFE	OUT
3	Hanis	SAFE	SAFE	SAFE	SAFE	SAFE	SAFE	SAFE	OUT
6-4	Ringo	OUT	SAFE	SAFE	SAFE	SAFE	SAFE	OUT	
6-4	Jay	SAFE	LOW	SAFE	LOW	SAFE	OUT	OUT	
6-4	Nadia	SAFE	SAFE	SAFE	SAFE	LOW	LOW	OUT	
7	Fiqa	SAFE	SAFE	SAFE	LOW	OUT			
8	Eyna	SAFE	OUT	LOW	OUT				
9	Valerie	SAFE	SAFE	OUT					
11-10	Natasha	SAFE	OUT						
11-10	Alison	SAFE	OUT						
12	Jean	SAFE	QUIT						

The contestant withdrew from the competition
The contestant was originally eliminated from the competition but was saved
The contestant was in danger of elimination
The contestant was eliminated
The contestant won the competition

- Episode 1 & 2 are casting episodes. From 28 semifinalists down to 12 contestants.
- In episode 3, Ringo, who'd been eliminated as a semifinalist, entered the competition as one girl from the original cast decided to quit. Beside, no one is eliminated on both this episode and episode 4 as the viewers begin to vote for the contestant.
- In episode 5, Jean decided to quit due to personal reason.
- In episode 13, Jay was originally eliminated for having the fewest SMS votes, but Sazzy decided to save her.
- Episode 18 is the reunion episode.

== Season 2 ==
The second season of Malaysian Dreamgirl aired from 28 February to 21 May 2009, with the auditions held in Penang, Ipoh, Johor Bahru and Kuala Lumpur from 13 December 2008 to 10 January 2009. Model & actress Elaine Daly will replace Sazzy Falak as the host of the show and join with her will be 3 mentors are: fashion stylist Jimmy Lim, Andrews Models' founder Andrew Tan of and Beautilicious' founder Julie Wong. The show aired 2 episodes on Thursday & Saturday per week, with each voting week runs from Tuesday to the next Monday, and elimination will be based on the SMS vote count for the particular week only.

This season contained 24 episodes, followed 12 girls will be spend 13 weeks competed in photoshoots and challenges to convince the viewers vote for them. At least one contestant would be eliminated each week based on the lowest SMS voting until 3 finalist were chosen, at which a winner was chosen on the live finale catwalk show at The Curve on 15 May 2009.

Among with the prizes include: a modeling contract with Andrews Models, an editorial spreads in Intrend magazine, a brand new Chevrolet Aveo, a cash prize of RM10,000, a brand new HP Pavilion and vouchers from Wella, Escada Fragrances, Wacoal, Beautilicious, Marie France Bodyline, Bella Skin Care & Svenson Hair Care with a total value of RM6,500.

The winner of this season was 22-year-old Juanita Francis from Johor.

=== Contestants ===
(ages stated are at time of contest)

Contestant	Nickname	Age	Height	Hometown	Finish	Place
Rajvinderjeet Kaur	Rajvin	25	1.73 m (5 ft 8 in)	Ipoh	Episode 5	12 (quit)
Nor Hafsah Bt Mat Nor	Acha	22	1.70 m (5 ft 7 in)	Selangor	Episode 7	11–10
Mayang Seri Bt Hashim	Maya	28	1.72 m (5 ft 7 1/2 in)	Kuala Lumpur	Episode 7	11–10
Nurliana Mohd Rafiai	Liana	27	1.69 m (5 ft 6 1/2 in)	Kuala Lumpur	Episode 9	9
Ummi Farahnasuha Bt Zulkefli	Farah	17	1.57 m (5 ft 2 in)	Kuala Lumpur	Episode 11	8
Shaheeda Salim Ahmad	Shasya	20	1.71 m (5 ft 7 1/2 in)	Penang	Episode 13	7
Denezia Alessandra Maryanne Beins	Denezia	17	1.68 m (5 ft 6 in)	Malacca	Episode 13	6
Natasha Carey Bt Mohd Johari	Natasha	18	1.68 m (5 ft 6 in)	Kuala Lumpur	Episode 17	5
Chiang Lee Ming	Ming	21	1.61 m (5 ft 3 1/2 in)	Malacca	Episode 21	4
Dawn Lim Yeen Sze	Dawn	23	1.70 m (5 ft 7 in)	Kuala Lumpur	Episode 23	3
Liew Mee Han	Pinky	20	1.70 m (5 ft 7 in)	Kuala Lumpur	Episode 23	2
Juanita Anushya Francis Jacob	Juanita	22	1.67 m (5 ft 5 1/2 in)	Johor	Episode 23	1

=== Results table ===
Place	Model	Episodes								
Place	Model	5	7	9	11	13	15	17	21	23
1	Juanita	SAFE	SAFE	SAFE	SAFE	SAFE	SAFE	SAFE	LOW	WINNER
2	Pinky	SAFE	SAFE	SAFE	LOW	SAFE	SAFE	SAFE	LOW	OUT
3	Dawn	SAFE	SAFE	SAFE	SAFE	LOW	LOW	LOW	SAFE	OUT
4	Ming	SAFE	SAFE	SAFE	SAFE	SAFE	OUT	LOW	OUT	
5	Natasha	SAFE	SAFE	SAFE	SAFE	LOW	LOW	OUT		
6	Denezia	SAFE	SAFE	SAFE	LOW	OUT				
7	Shasya	SAFE	SAFE	LOW	SAFE	OUT				
8	Farah	SAFE	OUT	LOW	OUT					
9	Liana	SAFE	SAFE	OUT						
11-10	Acha	SAFE	OUT							
11-10	Maya	SAFE	OUT							
12	Rajvin	QUIT								

The contestant withdrew from the competition
The contestant was originally eliminated from the competition but was saved
The contestant was in danger of elimination
The contestant was eliminated
The contestant won the competition

- Episode 1, 2 & 3 are casting episodes. From 21 semifinalists down to 12 contestants.
- In episode 5, Rajvin decided to quit due to health reason. Beside, no one is eliminated on both episode 4 and this episode as the viewers begin to vote for the contestant.
- In episode 15, Ming was originally eliminated for having the fewest SMS votes, but Elaine decided to save her.
- In episode 19 & 20, no one is eliminated as the show will take a short break before resume filming.
- Episode 24 is the recap episode.

== Crossover Appearances ==
- Cindy (Season 1) joined a reality show called Castrol EDGE Sport Speed Challenge along with another partner, Eva, they're named "Hot Chics".
- Jay (Season 1) is the winning model for Project Runway Malaysia (Season 1).
- Ming (Season 2) was a finalist in the Estee Lauder Model Search 2007.
- Acha (Season 2) is in the Top-30 for Redbull Female Driver Search.
- Juanita (Season 2) was a Top 3 finalist (Category A: Under 29's) in the Estee Lauder Model Search 2009, she is also in the running to become Ford Models: Supermodels Of The World Malaysia.

== See also ==
- I Wanna Be A Model
