= Edmund Ser =

Malaysian fashion designer

- Born: Ser Chen Huah; 11 November 1955 (age 70); Kuala Lumpur
- Education: Canterbury College of Art, England; Medway College of Design in Rochester, England
- Occupations: Fashion designer, Businessman
- Spouse: Chong Lee Kion (born 1968)
- Children: Audrey Ser (born 1991); Cassandra Ser (born 1992); Nataly Ser (born 1998); Ashley Ser (born 1998)
- Parent(s): Ser Whan Boon (1907–2003); Lee Oi Lin (1909-2011)

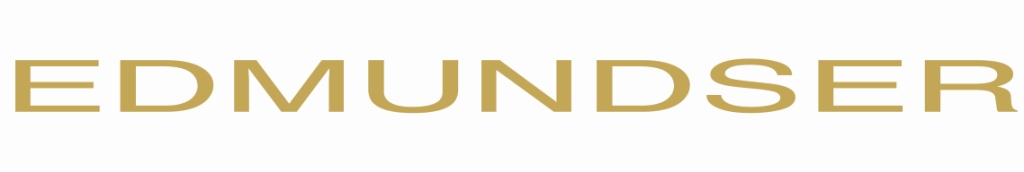
Edmund Ser Logo

Edmund Ser

Chinese name
- Traditional Chinese: 史振華
- Simplified Chinese: 史振华
- Hanyu Pinyin: Shǐ Zhèn Huá
- Jyutping: Si2 Zan3 Waa4
- Hokkien POJ: Sú Chín-hôa
- Tâi-lô: Sú Tsín-huâ

Edmund Ser (Chinese: 史振華; pinyin: Shǐ Zhèn Huá; Jyutping: Si2 Zan3 Waa4; Pe̍h-ōe-jī: Sú Chín-hôa) (born Ser Chen Huah, 11 November 1955) is a Malaysian fashion designer and businessman based in Kuala Lumpur, Malaysia. He is best known for his designer brand, Edmund Ser of Malaysia. He created the Edmund Ser, Spade, and SER fashion labels. He has been a guest judge on Project Runway Malaysia, as well as judging the Malaysia Young Designers' competition and the Miss Malaysia Pageant.

== Early life ==
Ser, a third-generation Malaysian Chinese, was born into a middle-class Chinese family in Kuala Lumpur's Jalan Imbi in November 1955. "As the youngest, I guess I led a spoilt life. Everything was there for me. As a family we had more or less a good life. We did not face any particular hardship." Ser spent his primary and secondary school years at Methodist Boys' School Kuala Lumpur. Ser played many games and sports in school, representing his school for badminton and hockey. Television was a factor that influenced Ser's choice to enter the fashion trade. He says, "programmes like the David Cassidy show had an effect on me. The bell bottoms, costumes and all ...' A fashion show held in 1968 to mark the diamond jubilee of the Methodist Boys' School Kuala Lumpur was one of Ser's inspirations to take up fashion design for a living. Andy Chew was among the first few established local designers in the early 1970s.

Ser apprenticed at a local men's tailor from 1973–1975. He travelled to England in 1975, where he took a course on clothing and craft at the Medway College of Design in Rochester, Kent. During that course, he sat for the City and Guilds of London Institute external exam and obtained a craft certificate in men's tailoring. Ser left halfway through the course at Medway, as he felt he had already learned all there was to learn, and enrolled for a four-year diploma in art at the Canterbury College of Art in Kent. He studied tailoring from a master cutter who fashioned clothes for Queen Elizabeth II. During this time he passed the City and Guilds of London Institute advanced craft certificate in men's retail bespoke tailoring. During his years in the United Kingdom, Ser worked in Chinese restaurants and did odd jobs to fund his studies.

Upon graduation in 1979, he obtained a tailoring job at Thomas Pratt & Sons Limited in London for six months. Ser felt a sense of responsibility towards Malaysia. "I could have stayed back and worked in England, but I believe I can contribute to this country after having had my education there," he said. He then returned home to Kuala Lumpur in 1980.

Ser borrowed RM5,000 from his parents and teamed with a former schoolmate, who invested another RM5,000, to set up a men's tailoring shop, called West Point Fashion House. Ser believed that work wear was something that "has to be presentable, fresh, crisp and most importantly comfortable." Due to high rent increases, Ser and his partner were forced to move their shop in 1983. Ser split with his partner in 1984 and set up his own shop to make men's and ladies' clothes, with financial support from his family and his friend Orson Wong, 1999 President of the Malaysian Official Designers' Association (MODA).

He was relatively unknown when he did his first fashion show. Ser said he was referred to by people in the industry as "the tailor-boy" when he did his first fashion show with another better-known local designer. The title hurt, but it made him more determined to go forward.

== Fashion career ==
Ser specialises in jackets and career apparel. Since the 1990s, Malaysian women have been described as more receptive to colours than design, and colours played a big role in Ser's collections. Ser is known for his cut in suits.

=== Early Success (1980s–1990s) ===
Ser's initial attempts to upgrade men's fashion received a poor response, so he switched to women's fashion, as women were emerging into the workforce at that time. He was known for his non-conformist ideas combined with his cutting. Ser concentrated in mass production for various department stores in Kuala Lumpur, Petaling Jaya, and Singapore under his own label. Ser supplied 'cut-make-trim' (CMT) clothes for department stores such as Oval, Parkson and Isetan. The Edmund Ser line for women was launched in 1987 to a very encouraging response. In 1992 Ser opened his first Edmund Ser boutique in Concorde Hotel Kuala Lumpur, specialising in made-to-measure women's office clothes.

Ser was once labelled as the 'avant garde jacket man', and that became his signature line in the 1990s. Ser was known for his Charlie Chaplin-inspired suits, which were presented at Malaysian Contemporary Designers' Shows in the 1990s, an event organised by the department store Parkson.

Ser gained a foothold in Singapore in 1988. Carontique fashion house at Penang Plaza in Penang was one of Ser's earlier breakthroughs to other states in Malaysia. Carontique's decision to drape Penang women with the same hands and materials that dressed the TV3 broadcasters helped secure the franchise to distribute the Edmund Ser ready-to-wear line of clothing in the city. Ser is now known throughout the country for providing clothes to celebrity TV newscasters at television stations such as TV3 and Ntv7. Ser states, "I am more of a businessman than a designer". In 1992 Ser had boutiques at The Saga, in Park Mall, and at The Saga, in Metro Singapore.

Ser's apparel was also sold in the Philippines, Indonesia, Thailand and Japan. Ser was the first local designer to use crushed velvet in his collection, joining international fashion designers such as Prada and Ralph Lauren.

In December 1995, Bobby R. Novenario Pte, Inc. supported the formal opening of Suitables by Edmund Ser at Ayala Center, Makati, Philippines. In Manila, Ser was identified as one of the brightest names in the Asean fashion scenes of the 90s. Bobby Novenario, impressed with Ser's well-fitting suits for the Asian figure, brought Ser to Manila to design a fashion line for Filipino corporate ladies.

In March 1996 Ser attended the 22nd Asian Roundtable by the Asian Club Foundation held in Kobe, Japan, as a guest speaker on the topic of Fashion in Asia. In 1998 Edmund Ser took its name to the newly opened Suria KLCC shopping centre in the Petronas Towers in Kuala Lumpur City Centre . By 1999, Ser had 11 Edmund Ser boutiques, including three in Singapore. The outlets in Kuala Lumpur were in the Concorde Hotel Kuala Lumpur.

==== Fashion Shows ====
Ser held various themed fashion shows in the 1990s, under his SER by Edmund Ser label. His venues were usually in Spices Restaurant and in the Concorde Ballroom. In July 1990, Ser held a fashion show in Oval, featuring the Edmund Ser Ready-To-Wear Collection. Parkson Corporation's Contemporary Designers Show (1990) featured Ser's trademark line.

Ser was a representative of Malaysia in the Asean Designers' Scene, where he represented Malaysia for the Asean Designers' show in Singapore, the Philippines, and other states in 1987, 1988, 1989, 1990, 1992, and 1996. In 1992 Ser was titled amongst Asean's best five, alongside Sira Kulsethsiri of Thailand, Arthur Yen of Singapore, Frederick Perlata of the Philippines, and Samuel Wattimena of Indonesia.

Chung Khiaw Bank Visa presented Ser's "An Afternoon With Edmund Ser" in October 1993. The Transylvania Look and a preview of his 1994 Chinoire Collection were featured, as well as "An Evening with Edmund Ser" in conjunction with the bank's Gold Card launch. Ser was amongst 15 top Malaysian designers to participate in the Malaysia in style fashion extravaganza.

In 1995 Ser showcased his Middlesex collection for three consecutive nights in the Concorde Hotel Kuala Lumpur. The 'middle-sex' look, which was a sexually grey area that could be read as androgynous or bi-sexual, was a 1996 forecast for world fashion. Ser presented double-breasted jackets with six buttons and hugging the hips for 1996. Priority Plus, with the support of Cathay Pacific, BMG Malaysia, Nescafe, Sothys Paris, and Concorde Hotel Kuala Lumpur, had their 'Thank You' party featuring Edmund Ser's 1996 Middlesex Collection.

In 1996 Ser's fashion shows presented a different image through a more fashionable, as opposed to classic, line. The collection featured numerous coordinates in white, black, and checks.

=== Expansion and New Brands (early 2000s) ===
In 2002, Ser expanded into a large market of those earning RM2000 and over. Ser created the Spade label; its flagship store was situated on the concourse floor, alongside international designer brands such as Marc Jacobs and Paul Smith. Spade featured asymmetrical, anonymous, and funky young designs for young adults.

In 2004 Edmund Ser opened in Hock Lee Centre Shopping Podium, Kuching, Malaysia. Ser has also ventured into the Sabahan market since 2007.

Ser suffered financially due to overexpenditures to launch the Spade brand, overexpansion of retail boutiques, the recession, and high rents at shopping malls. From 2003–2009, Ser decreased his number of retail boutiques, as the buying power in Malaysia had decreased tremendously due to the recession. As a result, Ser moved his focus from retailing to corporate uniforms servicing.

==== Fashion Shows ====
In the 2000s, Ser was an avid presenter, showcasing his collections at the Malaysia-International Fashion Week (M-IFW). At the Secretaries "Unplugged!" Luncheon in April 2003, Ser was one of the first three designers to take their creations to stage for the Kuala Lumpur Fashion Week 2003.

In 2005 Ser presented his collection in the Kuala Lumpur Asian Fashion Week. In 2006, Ser showcased his collection at the Glorious Fusion of Jewellery and Fashion show. In 2008 Ser held a fashion show at Island Plaza, Penang.

=== Corporate Fashion Success (late 2000s–current) ===
Ser moved his focus from retailing to corporate uniforms servicing as he was always cautious that "even if one is fairly successful at his moment, things may change, and one must be prepared if the change comes". This shift in Ser's own words "What if people do not like or do not want EDMUND SER anymore?" This is why I have gradually evolved my business throughout the years. From tailoring, to supplying for department stores, to having a department store counter, to having my own boutiques, and now to manufacturing uniforms for corporate companies. During my boutique and retailing days, I started in a silent manner, to take up uniform jobs and have expanded ever since. It is a shift from retailing to corporate uniforms. I think it is important to always anticipate and prepare ahead."

Ser designs, conceptualises, and manufactures made-to-measure uniforms for employees of various corporate groups. Ser's earliest corporate fashion business was for the Concorde Hotel Kuala Lumpur in 1991. Ser was commissioned to give the hotel a line of work suits that would reflect its youthful and dashing concept.

As of 2004, Edmund Ser was the corporate uniform supplier to about 30 clients, including hotels, banks, airlines, and the jewellery and travel sectors, while tailoring the designs to their respective concepts. Ser's clientele hails from all over South East Asia. Having moved on to produce designer uniforms for corporate companies, Ser is not facing the retail competition.

=== Fellow Designers ===
Ser was one of the founding members of the Malaysian Official Designers' Association (MODA), which was founded in 1987. He was treasurer in 1993.

Ser has mentored many Malaysian fashion designers who have gone on to win awards in the Asian fashion arena, including Brian Pawle, who was named one of three best for the night at the 1987 MODA-hosted Modasketch. In 1988 Gerald Lim won first prize at the 'Expressions-A Festival of Young Fashion Designers', organised by the Society for the Mentally Handicapped.

Director of People Republic, Daniel Lim, had his first fashion stint with Edmund Ser. Lim acknowledges that he learned a lot from Ser with regards to tailoring, detailing and workmanship. After three years with Ser, he started the Danielle label, which was carried in department stores such as Isetan as well as a multi-brand store in The Weld, Kuala Lumpur.

=== Judging ===
Ser has appeared on the reality television show Project Runway Malaysia on 8TV as guest judge since its inception in 2007. Ser sat on the panel for the MODA Malaysian Young Designers' Competition in 2009 and 2010. Ser judged the Miss Malaysia pageant in the 1990s.

== Personal life ==
Ser styles himself as a family man. He says that the person he admires most is his father. Ser's motto is "I Can, I Will, I Must Succeed".

Ser is the youngest son of Ser Whan Boon (6 July 1907 – 3 May 2003, Chinese Teochew descent) and his wife, Lee Oi Lin (19 June 1909 - 2011, Chinese Cantonese descent). Ser Whan Boon was a chief cashier under the Shell Group and Lee Oi Lin, a housewife. Ser is the youngest of four children. Ser's oldest brother, Ser Chin Nam (born 1939), is a retired policeman while his two older sisters, Ser Siew Hong and Ser Mui Hong, are in the fashion business with him.

Ser married his wife, Chong Lee Kion, known as Jackie Ser (born 6 May 1968), in 1989, and they have four daughters: Audrey Ser (born 10 April 1991) a Regional Legal Attorney at Morgan Stanley Hong Kong, Cassandra Ser (born 11 December 1992) a Transaction Advisory Services Senior Associate at Ernst & Young, and twins Nataly Ser and Ashley Ser (born 10 June 1998) both ACCA students. His twins are violinists at the National Symphony Orchestra of Malaysia and the Malaysian Philharmonic Youth Orchestra.

=== Hobbies ===
Ser enjoys cooking, saying that the hobby must have been a result of his years in England as a student. "If I wasn't a fashion designer, I would have become a chef," he said. Ser's deep-fried lamb cutlets were featured in The Malaysian Celebrity Cookbook. Ser is an animal lover and has always had dogs in his household.
