= Please Give Me a Job! =

- Created by: Ahmad Izham Omar
- Directed by: Lee Su May
- Presented by: Azah Yasmin
- Country of origin: Malaysia
- Original languages: Bahasa Malaysia & English
- No. of seasons: 1
- No. of episodes: 9

Production
- Executive producer: Lina Tan

Original release
- Network: 8TV
- Release: 15 April – 10 June 2007

Please Give Me a Job! is a Malaysian reality television programme produced by Red Communications and 8TV which features 10 fresh graduates vying for job placements in various companies. In each episode, the contestants compete in groups and take on various tasks. Created by Ahmad Izham Omar in cooperation with SEGi university college, it is hosted by Azah Yasmin. Datuk Clement Hii as the CEO of SEGi Education Group also plays a role in the show as mentor to the contestants, who appears in the beginning of each episode to give a short briefing to them in which he gives words of wisdom.

== Format ==
Unlike competition-formatted shows like The Apprentice which remove contestants candidacy for a potential job, Please Give Me a Job! "eliminates" its contestants by sealing job opportunities for them at the end of each episode. Throughout the show, contestants are to take on various challenges from companies of different industries. After each challenge, the management of each company will choose a number of contestants which they feel fit to be interviewed and one of them will eventually be given the job opening.

== Season 1 ==
=== Production team ===
- Lina Tan – Executive Producer
- Lee Su May – Director
- Lee Su May – Script
- Angie Choo and Karen Kuek – Assistant Directors
- Moh Hafiz, Melissa Lim and Christina Richard – Production Assistants
- Lee Mee Fung and Joanna Lee – PR & Marketing

=== Technical team ===
- Haris Hue – DOP
- Zolkefli – Sound

=== Post production team ===
- Oliver Lee and Farra Aizurin – Editors

=== Contestants ===
Name (Age)	Academic qualification, Institution	Recruited (Episode, Company)
Nurul Ain a.k.a. Katina Latif (21)	Bachelor of Performing Arts, University of Tasmania	
G. Justin Frances (24)	Bachelor of Law, University of London Programme at Kemayan ATC	Episode 9 (Received SEGi scholarship as consolation)
Juliet John (24)	Bachelor of Psychology, University of South Australia	Episode 9, Royal Selangor
Mohd Farez Atan (24)	Degree in Communications & Media Studies (Hons in Advertising)	Episode 8, SEGi University
Hisham Albakri Abdullah (24)	Bachelor of Multimedia (Media Studies), Swinburne University of Technology	Episode 7, 8TV
Krystle Lim Xin Ee (22)	Bachelor of Communications (Persuasive Communications), Universiti Sains Malaysia Programme at Taylor's College	Episode 6, Meda Inc. Berhad
Mike Cheng (22)	Bachelor of Mass Communications & Public Relations, Queensland University of Technology	Episode 5, Andaman Group
Azira Mustafa (24)	Interior Architecture, Limkokwing University College of Creative Technology	Episode 4, Red Communications
Natalia Chan (21)	Bachelor of Communications in Advertising & Marketing	Episode 3, MindShare
Charlene Rayna Sebastian (24)	BSc in Psychology, BSc in Communications, SEGi University	Episode 2, Media Prima

=== Episode list ===
Episode 1 (aired 15 April 2007)

Ten fresh graduates arrive at the SEGi building to begin their quest for job. For starters, they were tested by their résumé presentation skills, followed by a session of clothing selection at 1 Utama to groom them up for the challenges ahead.

Episode 2 (aired 22 April 2007)

The ten fresh graduates' first challenge was to make a promo for Fly FM which were recorded by its breakfast shift announcers Phat Fabes and Ben. They were split into two teams — one led by Justin and the other by Charlene. They were examined by the top management of Media Prima Radio Networks, who eventually picked Charlene and two members of her team, Azira and Hashim. Eventually it was Charlene who was offered a job in the broadcast company.

Episode 3 (aired 29 April 2007)

The nine remaining contestants were split into two again, this time led by Farez and Krystle, in a challenge to present an advertising idea to the management of MindShare to promote the upcoming film Pirates of the Caribbean: At World's End. Krystle's team won the challenge and she and two others, Hisham and Natalia were picked by the management for a round of interviews. Natalia emerged with the job placement.

Episode 4 (aired 6 May 2007)

The remaining eight were once again divided into two teams led respectively by Juliet and Mike for the task of making video clips themed on AIDS awareness for television program and film production company Red Communications. Mike's team won the task and he along with Hisham and Azira were given the interviews. Eventually, despite her lack of experience in the mass media industry, Azira landed a job in the company.

Episode 5 (aired 13 May 2007)

With seven job-seekers left (however, Katina called in sick thus only the other six competed), the task was to promote the Cova, Andaman Group's upcoming residential-cum-commercial construction project. Farez and Hisham became the two group leaders.
A notable event in this episode was when Farez said about having the company to arrange feng shui services for a customer who insisted on it. This had greatly upset the management of Andaman, nevertheless it was his group who won the task and he along with the other members, Krystle and Mike were interviewed. Mike landed the job in Andaman.

Episode 6 (aired 20 May 2007)

Six contestants remained, only to be helped by the return of Azira and Natalia to boost the performances of Justin and Katina's teams respectively for an events management task in the Summit USJ in conjunction with International Women's Day. As usual, the management of Meda Inc. Berhad, the developers of the Summit USJ, would watch over and judge the teams. This episode saw a spate of disorder and resentment among the members of Justin's team, particularly about how Justin led them.
As a result, Katina's team won hands down and she and Krystle were chosen for the interview with Meda's superiors. Krystle landed the job at Meda.

Episode 7 (aired 27 May 2007)

With Hisham and Juliet as the respective team leaders of five remaining contestants plus Mike who was brought back to help them, they take on a press conference organizing task for 8TV's new programmes So You Think You Can Dance (Malaysia) and Project Runway Malaysia respectively. Juliet's team was found to not follow the proper procedures of the task, and this led to a scuffle between the team leader and one of 8TV's directors.
Hisham's team won the task after winning praise by 8TV's directors for their teamwork and effective organization of their press conference, but in a twist, they chose the team leaders of both teams for the interview. Hisham won the round and landed a job at 8TV.

Episode 8 (aired 3 June 2007)

With only four contestants left, Krystle and Charlene were brought back to the show to assist Katina and Justin, and Juliet and Farez respectively for the task given by SEGi University's Senior Marketing Director, Bruce Lim, to make a promotion campaign for the college's new flagship campus in Kota Damansara. Both teams relied on the same one photographer, and Juliet's team, who used his services first, found it difficult to supervise him till he arrived at Katina's team late.
Despite the glaring flaws made by both teams, Katina's team won the task in terms of their promotional effectiveness, and the team leader was duly rewarded and automatically brought into the interview. Yet, SEGi's executives also chose Farez to join in, and eventually it was Farez who landed the job at SEGi.

Episode 9 (aired 10 June 2007)

The season finalé began with a shocking revelation that Katina is actually an actress named Nurul Ain who was sent into the competition by the producers to blend with the other contestants. This left Juliet and Justin remaining in contention for the last job opening in Royal Selangor, assisted by Natalia and Hisham respectively, by selling as many of the company's pewter merchandise to local celebrities in a closed (invitation-only) event.
After a discussion by six of Royal Selangor's directors, Juliet was selected to join their company while Justin, left without a job from the competition, was given a scholarship by SEGi to further his studies into the Masters level.
