= Estee Lauder Model Search =

Malaysian television series

Estee Lauder Model Search is a fashion-themed reality television show produced and broadcast in Malaysia.

Estee Lauder Model Search 2007 was held around the middle of 2007. The show featured 10 finalists:

- Winner: Wan Noraishah Samsudin
- Samantha Yen Yee Tan
- Sallie Suharly
- Adreana Zulkifli
- Marlini Bt. Che Mat Din
- Robyna Melissa How Mei Wan
- Chiang Lee Ming
- Florinda Johnson
- Celine Tan
- Deena Katrina Bte Dato Marzuki

Estee Lauder Model Search 2008 was held around the middle of 2008. The show featured 10 finalists:

- Winner: Carishiela May Kuijpers
- Sandra Yap Sze Hwui
- Teresa Zhang
- Jo-Anna Sue Henley-Rampas
- Siti Nurnabiha Badjenid
- Janet Bennet
- Amal Alkaff
- Putri Sarah Muna Friedli
- Jaslinder Kaur
- Michelle Yeoh Hui Fang

Estee Lauder Model Search 2009 was held around the middle of 2009. The show featured 12 finalists:

- Jennifer Pedersen
- Juanita Francis Jacob
- Nur Izzati Abdul'as
- Priscilla Daisy Collar
- Priyanka Puri
- Kok Xinyi
- El Omar
- Athena Francis Puglia
- Soraya Khatijah Matthews
- Lim Kah Ngee
- Fransiska Almarhumah Luhong James
- Shweta Shaiton Binti Muhyidin
