= Trippin (Malaysian TV series) =

- Presented by: Janice Yap (Season 2; current); Rina Omar (Season 1)
- Country of origin: Malaysia
- Original language: English

Production
- Running time: 30 mins per episode

Original release
- Network: 8TV
- Release: 12 November 2006 – 17 October 2007

Trippin is a Malaysian infotainment programme produced by 8TV, which sees local celebrities or (beginning season two) ordinary citizens being taken to various tourist attractions in the country, and involved in recreational activities, ranging from appreciation of arts and culture to extreme sports.

The programme has concluded its second season, which was hosted by Janice Yap. Rina Omar was the host of the show's first season.

== Episode list ==
=== Season 1 ===
Season One was hosted by Rina Omar, who is also currently one of the 8TV Quickie hosts.

=== Season 2 ===
Season Two, hosted by Janice Yap who took over from Rina, has DiGi Prepaid Fu-Yoh! as the main sponsor, and in some episodes, subscribers of this service appear to participate in the programme by winning a preceding contest.

| # | First aired | Activity | Location | Remarks |
|---|---|---|---|---|
| 1 | 25 July 2007 | Paramotoring | Pulau Indah, Selangor | Reefa as guest artiste |
| 2 | 1 August 2007 | Quad motorcycling Land surfing (a form of skateboarding) | Kuantan, Pahang | Two members of the public (DiGi Prepaid Fuyoh! subscribers) invited |
| 3 | 8 August 2007 | Skimboarding | Penang | nil |
| 4 | 15 August 2007 | Paintball | Subang Jaya, Selangor | Ruffedge, Tripple 6 Poser, Y2K as guest artistes |
| 5 | 22 August 2007 | Flight training | Ipoh, Perak | nil |
| 6 | 29 August 2007 | Drifting | Bandar Sunway, Selangor | nil |
| 7 | 5 September 2007 | Wakeboarding | Mines Resort, Selangor | Atilia as guest artiste for wakeboarding challenge |
| 7 | 5 September 2007 | Poweriser | Kuantan, Pahang | A DiGi Yellow Coverage Fellow made special appearance in Poweriser challenge |
| 8 | 12 September 2007 | Scuba diving | Sipadan, Sabah | Two members of the public (DiGi Prepaid Fuyoh! subscribers) invited |
| 9 | 19 September 2007 | Nature appreciation | Sandakan, Sepilok and Turtle Islands, Sabah | nil |
| 10 | 26 September 2007 | Ice skating and hockey | Sunway Pyramid, Selangor | nil |
| 11 | 3 October 2007 | Cultural experience with the Kenyah | off Miri, Sarawak | nil |
| 12 | 10 October 2007 | 4WD adventure | Lata Kijang, Negeri Sembilan | Two members of the public (DiGi Prepaid Fuyoh! subscribers) invited |
| 12 | 17 October 2007 | Aerobatics | Nusa Jaya, Johor | Two members of the public (DiGi Prepaid Fuyoh! subscribers) invited |

== Reception ==
Ruslina Yusoff of the New Straits Times wrote, "If you are adventurous and enjoy challenges like parachute-jumping or sitting in a specially designed seat which is hung on a few strong cables and thrown up in the air, the show is for you."
