= Kan-Cheong Kitchen =

- Genre: Cooking game show
- Directed by: Hasymee Latif Julaini
- Presented by: Phat Fabes (2008); Rina Omar (2008); Prem Shanker (2014–present); Megan Tan (2014–present)
- Country of origin: Malaysia
- Original language: English
- No. of seasons: 2
- No. of episodes: 26

Production
- Producer: Hasymee Latif Julaini

Original release
- Network: 8TV
- Release: 9 May 2008 – present

Kan-Cheong Kitchen is the title of a culinary-themed game show produced and broadcast by 8TV in Malaysia. Kan-cheong (緊張) is Cantonese for "nervous", which describes the tense, hustled atmosphere which arises from contestants deficient of cooking skills who had to cook on their own in a limited time, subjecting themselves to yelling.

In 2014, the show was renewed for second season which would premiered on 2 April 2014. The cash prize for the winning team was doubled to RM 2,000.

== Format ==
In each episode, two pairs, each consisting of a "cook" and a "cannot cook" (i.e. one possesses the skills while the other does not, at least for the featured meal), competing against each other in a cooking showdown. Only the "cannot cooks" will enter the kitchen and perform the cooking while the "cooks" yell instructions to their partners. To make matters harder, the "cooks" are kept fairly distant from the "cannot cooks" in a booth equipped with monitor to observe his/her partner's performance – a camera is attached on each "cannot cook's" forehead.

Kan-Cheong Kitchen is divided into three stages:

- Stage I: The contestants in the kitchen age given 30 seconds to prepare all the ingredients for the meal of the dat based on their partners' orders, after which they can only use the ingredients they managed to pull out, regardless if it is the exact mix or otherwise. For example, char hor fun has noodles as the primary ingredient, but forgetting to extract this important foodstuff would mean the meal has to be prepared without it anyway, as shown in Episode 4.
- Stage II: In the "Kan-Cheong Cookout" where the action is concentrated, the ones in the kitchen have 30 minutes to complete their culinary tasks under their partners' instructions, subject to noise and disturbances in the environment.
- Stage III: Up to three judges, usually consisting of a chef and a few celebrities, evaluate the contestants' products based on two criteria, i.e. presentation and taste, and whoever gains the higher score wins. In the event of a draw, the taste aspect would be given priority. Each winner takes home RM 1,000.

== Episodes ==
Celebrities have been specially brought into the challenge in special editions marking certain occasions:

- Episode 1 (9 May 2008): One in a Million season 2 winner and Norayu Damit and runner-up Shahila Amir Hamzah ignited the première of Kan-Cheong Kitchen with commoners as their cooking partners. Shahila's pair won.
- Episodes 5–7 (6–20 June 2008): In conjunction of UEFA Euro 2008, Hot FM, Fly FM and 8TV personalities face off against each other in attempting traditional European dishes.
