= Love in Between =

Chinese web series

- Genre: Wuxia; Romance
- Directed by: Mao Kunyu
- Country of origin: China
- Original language: Chinese
- No. of episodes: 43

Original release
- Network: Youku
- Release: June 8, 2020

Love in Between (Chinese: 少年游之一寸相思) is a 2020 Chinese wuxia streaming television series starring Zhang Yao and Zhang Yaqin. It follows Zuo Qingci, a young noble disguised as a skilled physician and Su Yunluo, a thief who is a master of disguise and skilled in qinggong. The series aired on Youku on June 8, 2020. The series received positive reviews and has a score of 8.2 on Douban.

== Cast ==
=== Main ===
- Zhang Yao as Zuo Qingci / Yan Zhi
  - Ma Bo Quan as young Zuo Qingci
- Zhang Ya Qin as Su Yunluo / Fei Kou'er
  - Li Ya Zhen as young Su Yunluo

=== Supporting ===
- Zou Ting Wei as Wen Siyuan / Sima Lang
  - Huang Xu Fei as young Sima Lang
- Deng Yu Li as Shen Manqing
- Zheng Hao as Yin Changge
- Shi Yun Peng as Zhu Yan
- Xu Meng Yuan as Xie Jiang'er
