= Kuala Lumpur Fashion Week =

Annual fashion event in Malaysia

- Genre: clothing and fashion exhibitions
- Date: August
- Frequency: Annually
- Locations: Kuala Lumpur, Malaysia
- Inaugurated: 2013
- Founder: Andrew Tan
- Website: www.klfashionweek.com

Kuala Lumpur Fashion Week, held in August in Kuala Lumpur, capital city of Malaysia, is a series of summer events (generally lasting five days) where international fashion collections are shown to buyers, the press and the general public.

Kuala Lumpur Fashion Week was created in 2013 as a platform for Malaysian designers to present and showcase their ready-to-wear collections, with the hopes of highlighting the strengths and creativity of Malaysia's Fashion Industry to local and international consumers. Kuala Lumpur Fashion Week is held at the Pavilion Kuala Lumpur in Malaysia in August and attracts more than 150,000 people. Kuala Lumpur Fashion Week is reserved for fashion professionals and can only be attended by invitation or accreditation. Journalists, bloggers, and buyers are accredited by the organizers of the event and the ready-to-wear brands who select any guests they choose to invite. Each year, organizers decide which five brands will present their collections while featuring a mix of other exciting designers. KLFW showcases designs never seen before, providing viewers with a first-hand look at designs.

== History ==
Kuala Lumpur Fashion Week (KLFW) was founded by Mr. Andrew Tan, who later participated in the Commonwealth Fashion Exchange, an initiative showcasing established and emerging designers from across Commonwealth countries. With support from Tourism Malaysia, KLFW has also participated in international events and promotional activities. The event focuses primarily onready-to-wear fashion, with collections intended for commercial production and retail sale following their presentation.
