= Bernard Chandran =

Malaysian fashion designer (born 1968)

Bernard Chandran SSAP DIMP
- பெர்னார்ட் சந்திரன்
- Born: 27 February 1968 (age 58); Petaling Jaya, Malaysia
- Education: Paris American Academy
- Spouse: Datin Sri Mary Lourdes Chandran
- Website: bernardchandran.com

Bernard Chandran (Tamil: பெர்னார்ட் சந்திரன்; born 27 February 1968) is a Malaysian fashion designer and television personality of Indian and Chinese origin. He gained recognition as the chief designer on the reality television show Project Runway Malaysia, which premiered on 8TV on August 3, 2007. Additionally, Chandran appeared as a guest judge on Britain's Next Top Model, Cycle 6, Episode 12, in which the top three models walked in his fashion show during London Fashion Week.

== Early years ==
Bernard Chandran was born to P. Ramachandran and Chow Yook Lin. In 1991, he won the 'Open European Contest for Look of the Year 2000', becoming the first non-European recipient of the title.

== Fashion business ==
=== #BlackLivesMatter Controversy ===
In 2020, Chandran released a line of designer face masks and promoted it with an Instagram post. The post featured a person with black face donning a yellow mask branded with Bernard Chandran's logo, and the hashtag #BlackLivesMatter. Some social media users accused Chandran of using blackface and profiting from the Black Lives Matter movement.

== Family ==
He is married to Datin Mary Lourdes Chandran, a former Malaysian model of ethnic Indian origin. They have five children. Chandran, a Hindu, stated that he wants his children to be grounded in Hinduism.

== Awards ==
- He was the first Malaysian to win the 'Open European Contest for Look of the Year 2000' in 1991.
- He was voted Designer of the Year at the Malaysian International Fashion Awards in 2003.
- He received the honorific Dato' in 2006 when Sultan Ahmad Shah Sultan Abu Bakar, the Sultan of Pahang, Malaysia awarded him the Dato' Indera Mahkota Pahang (DIMP).
- Chandran was awarded the Malaysian International Fashion Alliance's [MIFA] Special Achievement Award in 2009.
- He received the honorific title Dato' Sri in 2016 when he was conferred the Darjah Sri Sultan Ahmad Shah Pahang (SSAP) by Sultan Ahmad Shah Sultan Abu Bakar, the Sultan of Pahang, Malaysia.
- Pahang
  - Knight Companion of the Order of the Crown of Pahang (DIMP) – Dato' (2006)
  - Grand Knight of the Order of Sultan Ahmad Shah of Pahang (SSAP) – Dato' Sri (2016)
