= Project Runway Malaysia =

- Created by: Eli Holzman
- Starring: Bernie Chan
- Country of origin: Malaysia
- No. of episodes: 13

Production
- Running time: 60 minutes (including commercials)

Original release
- Network: 8TV
- Release: 3 August – 19 October 2007

Project Runway Malaysia is a Malaysian reality television series that focuses on fashion design, and is part of the international Project Runway franchise. It aired for one season, in 2007, on 8TV. On the show, contestants compete to create the best clothes and are usually restricted in their time, materials, and theme. Their designs are judged and one or more designers are eliminated each week. The winner receives RM100,000 and a chance to show their work at a local fashion week.

Project Runway is hosted by supermodel Bernie Chan and judged by a panel that usually includes Chan and designer Datuk Bernard Chandran. Mr. Chandran proved to be so popular that his role was expanded. Project Runway Malaysia was filmed in Kuala Lumpur.

The show was canceled after its first season.

== Season 1 ==
Project Runway Malaysia made its debut on air on 3 August 2007.

Season 1 featured model Eloise Law, who was the female champion from season one of 8TV's I Wanna Be A Model.
