= Chu Ke-liang =

Taiwanese comedian, actor, TV host and singer

- 豬哥亮
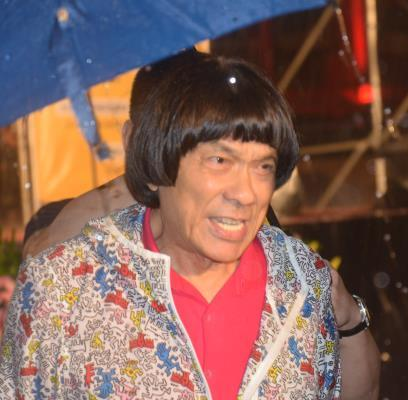
- Born: Hsieh Hsin-ta (謝新達 Siā Sin-ta̍t); 6 December 1946; Zuoying, Kaohsiung, Taiwan, Republic of China
- Died: 15 May 2017 (aged 70); National Taiwan University Hospital, Taipei, Taiwan
- Occupations: Comedian, television host, actor, singer
- Years active: 1980–2017
- Children: Jeannie Hsieh; Ting Xie

Chinese name
- Traditional Chinese: 豬哥亮
- Simplified Chinese: 猪哥亮
Transcriptions
Standard Mandarin
- Hanyu Pinyin: Zhū Gēliàng
Yue: Cantonese
- Jyutping: Zyu1 Go1 Loeng6
Southern Min
- Hokkien POJ: Ti Ko-liōng / Ti Ko-liāng
- Musical career
- Also known as: Chu Ko-liang

Hsieh Hsin-ta (6 December 1946 – 15 May 2017), professionally known as Chu Ke-liang (Chinese: 豬哥亮; pinyin: Zhū Gēliàng; Pe̍h-ōe-jī: Ti Ko-liōng or Ti Ko-liāng), was a Taiwanese comedian, actor, television show host and singer. He was known for his "over-the-top appearance" with unusual clothing and hair styles and his coarse humor.

== Early life ==
Chu was born Hsieh Hsin-ta (謝新達; Hokkien: Siā Sin-ta̍t) in Zuoying, Kaohsiung in Taiwan. Chu left home in his early teenage years to pursue his dream of being in the theater. He went on to receive tuition from Lin Sung-yen (林松煙 Lín Sōngyān) and became an actor and writer but remained largely unknown to the wider public. At around age 30, he had a role in a play about the semi-legendary Liao Tianding as the clown character Zhū Gēliàng. He was so popular in this role that he chose the name as his own stage name. (Note: Chu's name is usually rendered as Chu Ke-liang or Chu Ko-liang in English sources with "Chu" written separately as if it were a surname and "Ke-liang" written as if it were a given name (see Chinese name for further information). However, in Taiwanese, ti-ko (豬哥) is a single lexeme that literally means rooster (cockerel) but through semantic change means "womanizer" or "lecher" when referring to people. To this is added the character liōng (亮), one typically used in men's names. Together, the characters of this stage name are nearly homophonous (in Mandarin Chinese) with those of Three Kingdoms figure Zhūgě Liàng (諸葛亮). Because Chinese characters are written without intervening spaces or hyphens, the issue of the name spacing does not arise in Taiwanese or Mandarin.)

== Career ==
=== Early career ===
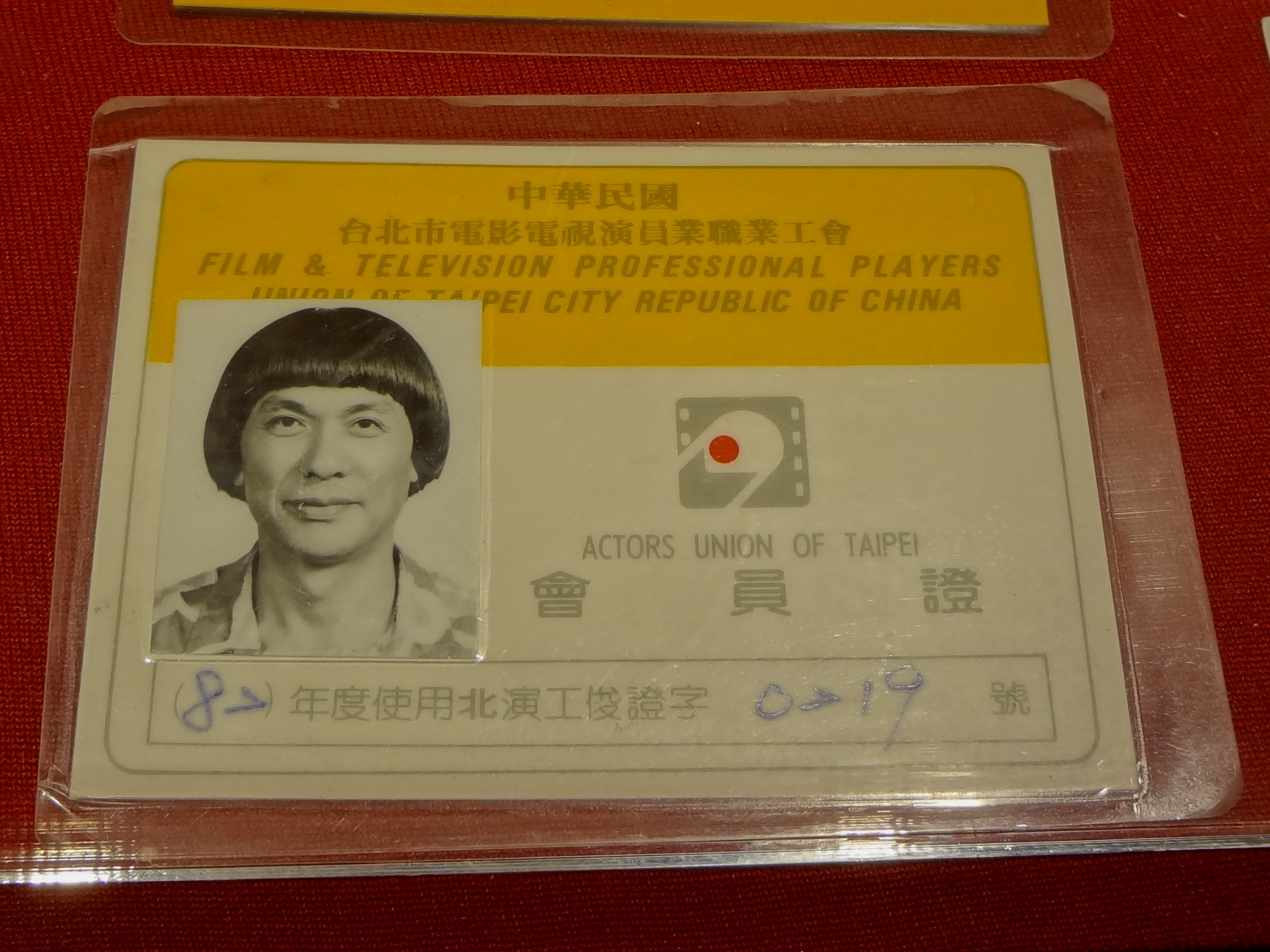
Chu's actor's union card from 1993

In 1980, the Chu Ke-liang Cabaret Show (豬哥亮歌廳秀; Zhū Gēliàng Gētīng Xiù) broke onto the scene in Taiwan and Chu's popularity took off. In the show, Chu had a mild-mannered persona but often used coarse language and double entendre. He would get into quarrels with the guest singers and tell off-color jokes. Along with Chang Fei, Frankie Kao, and Ni Min-jan, Chu was one of Taiwan's biggest TV stars of the 1980s.

In 1994, Chu campaigned on behalf of James Soong in his candidacy for the governorship of Taiwan province. Soong successfully used support from Chu, who was at the time Taiwan's most popular entertainer, to help convince Taiwanese to support a candidate with a mainland Chinese background.

=== Hiatus ===
Chu racked up gambling debts over NT$100 million (US$3.5 million) from playing Taiwan's illegal lottery and Hong Kong's Mark Six despite an income of NT$60 million per month. He is said to have owed his boss, Yang Tang-kuei, NT$120 million. As a result, he fled into hiding to escape this and other debts to underworld figures in 1995. He briefly returned to the public eye in 1997 but again absconded in 1999.

Reports of Chu's whereabouts occasionally surfaced. In 2002, Chu was spotted in a He Xian Gu temple in Wandan, Pingtung County. However, generally, the media took pains not to expose him. Chu's performances were available on videotape and were occasionally shown on Taiwan television, so his audiences did not forget him.

On 19 February 2009, correspondents from the tabloid Apple Daily followed Chu in various areas of Kaohsiung and Pingtung Counties before confronting him in a Yongda Road swordfish oden noodle restaurant in Pingtung City. With his trademark hair now slicked back, he told the reporters he was "still on the lam" and still very poor. He was reportedly working at a temple at the time.

Some of Chu's former fellow performers, including Chang Fei, Frankie Kao and Kevin Chu, called for Chu to return to public life and for his creditors to spare his life so he could work to repay his debts.

=== Comeback ===
Following Chu's exposure in an Apple Daily cover story, Sanchong legislator and entertainer Yu Tian, on 23 April 2009, announced an advertising deal between Chu and Tsann Kuen 3C whereby Chu would receive NT$2 million. The following day, Chu announced plans for a comeback in a short speech aired on Taiwan's major TV channels. Chu euphemistically said that he had been "studying abroad" for ten years but that he was grateful to the media for "photographing me eating oden". He said he had always wanted to come back but did not have the courage.

According to the China Times, Yu facilitated a meeting between Chu and Chu's former boss Yang Tang-kuei where Yang agreed to forgive 80 percent off the total debt owed to him. Chu was required to give Yang 20 percent of his earnings until he repaid the remaining NT$24 million he owed.

On 5 June 2009, Golden Throne Communication TV Co., Ltd. announced a series of new video-on-demand shows starring Chu. Recording of a new variety show hosted by Chu, Zhūgē Huìshè (豬哥會社), (Note: The name of Chu's show, Zhūgē Huìshè (豬哥會社) also has a double meaning arising from the Taiwanese ti-ko (豬哥; "womanizer" or "lecher" when referring to people) It can mean "Chu Ke(-liang)'s Club" but also "gentlemen's club", i.e. strip club.) began in July 2009. Chu received NT$300,000 per show for his new program as of 2009.

On 16 September 2010, Chu released his first music album, Dōngshānzàiqǐ (東山再起). In the following month, he was recognized in the Golden Bell Awards as Best Variety Show Host, together with his co-host, Rene Hou.

Chu also had a major part as a city councilman in the 2011 hit movie Night Market Hero, a role which cemented his comeback.

== Illness and death ==
Chu was diagnosed with stage II colorectal cancer in 2014. He feared the adverse effects that came along with the cancer treatment especially the installation of colostomy, leading him to delaying to have intensive treatments until September 2016 when he had severe ascites and poor health status where he were left no choice. (It's reported that Chu had tried many other regimens and unknown treatments both are not proven to be effective instead of the surgery and chemotherapy which are proven to be effective in treating cancer.) Whereas, even though he finally returned to the hospital to accept surgery of removal of the malignant tumor, his cancer had advanced to the final stage, which had metastasized to his other organs, including his lungs and liver. When interviewed subsequent to the surgery, he said "I should have believed in evidence-based medicine two years ago."

Having terminal colorectal cancer for three years, Chu died in the National Taiwan University Hospital on 15 May 2017 due to liver failure. He was 70. A private memorial was held on 16 May. A public funeral attended by 2,000 people took place in Banqiao on 20 June.

== Image and influence ==
Chu's screen image includes a distinctive hairstyle and clothing. Chu typically wears a (sometimes colorful) dinner jacket with a bowtie but with bermuda shorts, black shoes, and white socks. Chu's hairstyle has been called a "toilet-lid (馬桶蓋 mǎtǒng gài) haircut" and is similar to a bowl cut like that of Moe Howard of the Three Stooges but covering the ears and shoulder-length at the back.

Taiwanese entertainer Show Lo is a known admirer of Chu and has imitated his style.

== Personal life ==
Chu was married four times and had two sons and three daughters. His second daughter, Jeannie Hsieh, is a well-known Taiwanese singer and actress.

== Filmography ==
- Naughty Cadets on Patrol (大頭兵出擊 Dàtóu Bīng Chūjí) (1987)
- King of the Children (孩子王 Háizi Wáng) (1988)
- Tiānxià Yī Dà Lè (天下一大樂) (1988)
- Young Soldier (少爺當大兵 Shàoyé Dāng Dàbīng) (1990)
- The New Legend Of Shaolin (1994)
- Night Market Hero (2011)
- The Killer Who Never Kills (2011)
- New Perfect Two (2012)
- David Loman (2013)
- Twa-Tiu-Tiann (2014)
- The Wonderful Wedding (2015)
- David Loman 2 (2016)
- The Big Power (2016)
- Hanky Panky (2017)
