= Fei Chang =

Fei Chang may refer to:

- The Wade–Giles spelling of the name of Zhang Fei, an ancient Chinese general
- Chang Fei, a Taiwanese singer and TV personality
