= Lan Cheng-lung =

Taiwanese actor and director (born 1979)

- 藍正龍
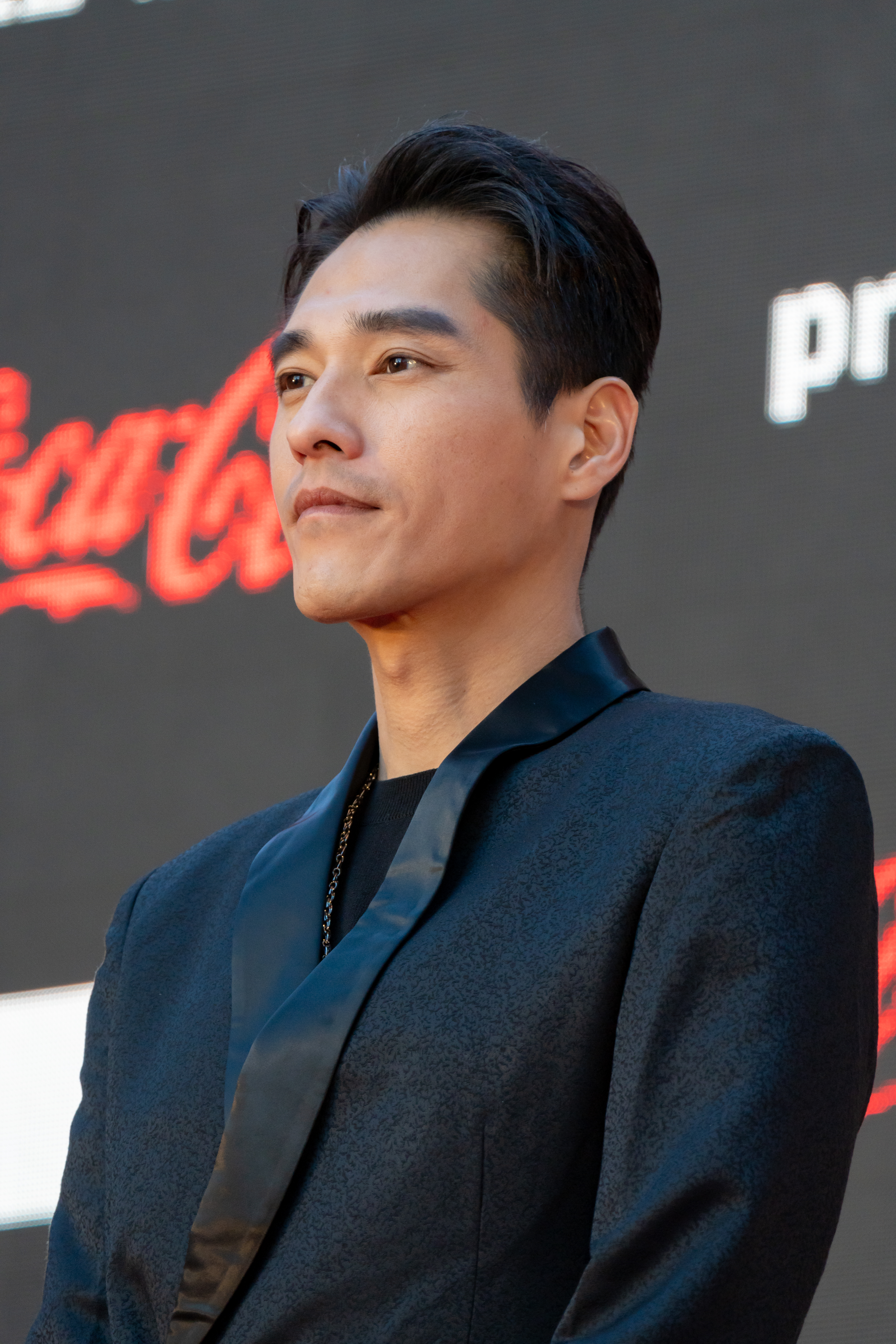
- Lan at the 2023 Tokyo International Film Festival
- Born: March 1, 1979 (age 47); Luodong, Yilan, Taiwan
- Other name: Blue Lan
- Education: Hwa Hsia University of Technology
- Occupations: Actor, film director
- Years active: 1999—present
- Spouse: Jade Chou (m. 2014; div. 2023)
- Children: 2

Chinese name
- Traditional Chinese: 藍正龍
- Simplified Chinese: 蓝正龙
- Hanyu Pinyin: Lán Zhènglóng
- Hokkien POJ: Nâ Chèng-liông

Lan Cheng-lung (Chinese: 藍正龍; Pe̍h-ōe-jī: Nâ Chèng-liông, born March 1, 1979), also known as Blue Lan, is a Taiwanese actor and film director.

== Career ==
Lan was born in Yilan, Taiwan. He started his career as a commercial model, and made his acting debut in 2000. He gained attention for a small role as Ya-men in Meteor Garden and went on appearing in many popular films and dramas, including Night Market Hero (2011) and The Wonderful Wedding (2015).

== Personal life ==
Lan was in a high–profile relationship with actress Barbie Hsu from 2001 to 2005. In 2006, he dated Yvonne Yao for three months, followed by a two-year relationship with his girlfriend Lin Xinru until 2008. In late 2009, he briefly dated Easy Fortune Happy Life co-star Jocelyn Wang.

He met Jade Chou in 2000. The two began dating in 2011 and married in May 2014. They have a daughter, born in May 2015 and a son, born in October 2016. They divorced in 2023.

== Filmography ==
=== Television series ===
Year	English title	Original title	Role	Notes
2000	Big Hospital Small Doctor	大醫院小醫師	Yang Ko	
2001	Spicy Teacher	麻辣鮮師	Lan Hsing-lung	
2001	Duo Sang and Rose	多桑與紅玫瑰	Cheng Ping-hua	
2001	Meteor Garden	流星花園	Ya-men	
2001	Three-line Chasing Husband	追夫三人行	Lin Tien-hsing	
2001	Magical Love	愛情大魔咒	Li Tao	
2002	Forever Remember	永遠的銘記	Chin Nan-chih	
2003	Banquet	赴宴	Kuo Min-feng	
2003	The Outsiders	鬥魚	Shan Li-chieh	
2004	Say Yes Enterprise	求婚事務所-情書	Hsieh Yi-shu	Story 3: Love Letter
2004	Jia You Fei Fei	家有菲菲	Hsu Shao-wei	
2004	Blazing Courage	火線任務	Tang Han-sheng	
2004	Cold Fronts	冷鋒過境	Hsiao-lung	
2005	Main dans la main	45度C天空下	Lin Yu-cheng	
2005	The Legend of Hero	中華英雄	Mu Xi	
2006	Golden Age	金色年華	Cheng Tzu-hua	
2006	Dangerous Mind	危險心靈	Lawrence Wang	
2007	Aurora	北極光	Sung Huai-en	
2008	Police et vous	波麗士大人	Liu Han-chiang / Liu Kuo-chang (young)	
2008	I Do?	幸福的抉擇	Li Hao-che	
2009	Easy Fortune Happy Life	福氣又安康	Yen Wang-tsai (young) / Yen Ta-feng	
2009	Fall in Love with You Before the Sunset	日落之前愛上你	Chang Shih-ling	
2010	Strands of Love	絲絲心動	Ouyang Chen	
2010	PS Man	偷心大聖PS男	Hsia Ho-chieh	
2010	The Gifts	女王不下班	Wu Tien-liang	
2012	I Love You So Much	粉愛粉愛你	Chang Yu-chieh	
2012	Happy Michelin Kitchen	幸福三顆星	An Shao-cheng	
2014	Chocolat	流氓蛋糕店	Chin Shih-wu	
2014	Apple in Your Eye	妹妹	Tai Yao-chi	
2016	Jiang Teacher, You Talked About Love It	姜老師，妳談過戀愛嗎	Chen Wei-lin	
2017	Wake Up 2	麻醉風暴2	Hsieh Teng-feng	
2017	Running Man	逃婚一百次	Bartender	
2018	My Ex-Man	前男友不是人!?	Tai Hai-an	
2018	Chosen	殺無赦	Dai Huan	
2019	All Is Well	你那邊怎樣·我這邊OK	Kuo Hao-sen	
TBA		中元大餐		

=== Film ===
Year	English title	Original title	Role	Notes
2000	A Matter of Time	新賭國仇城	Hsiao-chu	
2005	Fall... in Love	戀人	Alan	
2006	Heaven in Ten Days	十日天堂	Wang Tsung	
2007	Brotherhood of Legion	神選者	Ren Fang	
2009	L-O-V-E	愛到底	Vincent	Segment "Hua Shan 24"
2010	Fantome, Ou es-tu?	酷馬	Coach Liu	
2011	Night Market Hero	雞排英雄	A-hwa	
2011	A Big Deal	巨額交易	Chang Tse	
2011	Spin Kid	電哪吒	Hao	
2011	Joyful Reunion	飲食男女2：好遠又好近	Chang Chuan	
2013	Forever Love	阿嬤的夢中情人	Liu Chi-sheng	
2013	Lift to Hell	電梯驚魂	Dr. Lin Fei	
2014	The Love Frequency	愛的頻率		
2014	Dangerous Game	夫妻游戲	Wang Yuan	
2015	The Bag's Secret	包裡的秘密		
2015	The Wonderful Wedding	大囍臨門	Airport staff	Cameo
2017	Hanky Panky	大釣哥	Lan Hsiao-lung	
2017	The Mysterious Family	神秘家族	The stranger	
2018	The Outsiders	鬥魚	Shan Li-jie (adult)	Special appearance
2019	A Fool in Love, Love Like a Fool	傻傻愛你，傻傻愛我	Ke Fu	Also as director
2023	After School	成功補習班		As director

=== Music video appearances ===
Year	Artist	Song title
1999	Ginny Liu	"5AM"
1999	T-ana	"Lies"
2001	Freya Lim	"It's All Him"
2003	Sammi Cheng	"Beautiful Misunderstanding"
2004	Phil Chang	"Destroy"
2008	Ding Dang	"One I Loved"
2015	Cyndi Wang	"Far Away"
2019	Ricky Hsiao	"Migratory Bird"

== Awards and nominations ==
Year	Award	Category	Nominated work	Result
2004	39th Golden Bell Awards	Best Leading Actor in a Television Series	Cold Fronts	Nominated
2014	49th Golden Bell Awards	Best Leading Actor in a Television Series	Chocolat	Nominated
2015	50th Golden Bell Awards	Best Leading Actor in a Television Series	Apple in Your Eye	Won
2017	52nd Golden Bell Awards	Best Leading Actor in a Television Series	Jiang Teacher, You Talked About Love It	Nominated
