= The Wonderful Wedding =

- poster
- Traditional Chinese: 大囍臨門
- Simplified Chinese: 大喜临门
- Hanyu Pinyin: Dà Xǐ Lín Mén
- Hokkien POJ: Tōa Hí Lîm Mn̂g
- Directed by: Huang Chao-liang
- Screenplay by: Li Hui Juan; Zhou Yuan Jiao
- Produced by: Kevin Chu
- Starring: Chu Ke-liang; Ruby Lin; Li Dongxue; Kou Hsi-shun; Lin Mei-hsiu
- Edited by: Chen Bo Wen
- Production companies: Hualien Media International; Shine Picture Arts Co., LTD; Full Entertainment Taiwan; Huayi Brothers
- Distributed by: Huayi Brothers mm2 Entertainment
- Release dates: 18 February 2015 (Taiwan); 5 March 2015 (Hong Kong/China)
- Running time: 104 minutes
- Countries: Taiwan; China
- Languages: Mandarin; Taiwanese

The Wonderful Wedding is a 2015 Taiwanese comedy film starring Chu Ke-liang, Ruby Lin, Li Dongxue, Kou Hsi-shun and Lin Mei-hsiu. A meet-the-parents-of-fiancée comedy, it pokes fun at the cultural and linguistic differences between Kaohsiung in southern Taiwan and Beijing in northern China.

Typical for a comedy starring Chu Ke-liang, it was released a day before the Chinese New Year in Taiwan.

== Plot ==
A protective father's unreasonable obsession with traditions nearly derails his daughter's wedding.

== Cast ==
- Chu Ke-liang as Li Jin Shuang
- Ruby Lin as Li Shu Fen
- Li Dongxue as Gao Fei
- Kou Hsi-shun as Gao Shou
- Lin Mei-hsiu as Qian Song Yi
- Lin Mei-chao
- Akio Chen
- Xia Yi as Zhang Jing
- Huang Hsi Tien
- Su Zhu
- Wang Tsai-hua
- Weather Girls
- JJ Lin (Cameo)
- Richie Jen (Cameo)
- Lan Cheng-lung (Cameo)

== Soundtrack ==
Both songs were written by Chen Kuo-hua.

- Theme song 1: "Hoa Hee Lai Cha Cha" (歡喜來恰恰; "Happy, Come Cha-Cha")
  - Language: Hokkien
  - Performer: Jacky Chen, Ric, Daniel Luo, Kuo Chin-fa
- Theme song 2: "Hao Xiang Hao Xiang Ni" (好想好想你; "Really, Really Miss You")
  - Language: Mandarin
  - Performer: 九九 Sophie Chen

== Box office ==
The Wonderful Wedding was the top domestic film of the Chinese New Year holidays in Taiwan, breaking the NT$100 million (US$3.15 million) mark in 5 days. The Wonderful Wedding made NT$54.96 million (US$1.74 million) in Taipei after four weekends.
