= Xia Yi =

- 夏禕
- Pronunciation: Xià Yī
- Born: 1968 (age 57–58); Shanghai
- Occupations: Singer, actress

Xia Yi (Chinese: 夏禕; pinyin: Xià Yī; born 1968, Shanghai) is a Chinese opera performer and entertainer based in Taiwan.

== Biography ==
=== Early life and career beginnings ===
Xia was born into a family of Peking opera performers in Shanghai and began studying the art form in Beijing at a young age. She was nominated for the China Theatre Plum Blossom Award at the age of 17. After marrying her first husband, whom she met in the United States, she relocated to Taiwan at 23. The marriage later ended in divorce due to her husband's gambling problems, extramarital affairs, and business failures.

In Taiwan, Xia initially found work as a martial arts stunt double on Pai Ping-ping's television program and later secured a supporting role in Hou Hsiao-hsien's film Flowers of Shanghai.

=== Rise to fame ===
Xia gained popularity after appearing on the variety show Variety Big Brother, where the cultural differences between her native Shanghai and Taiwan were used as a source of comedy, leading to playful on-air banter with the host, Chang Fei.

In 2004, Xia began an affair with Ni Min-jan, her married co-star in a xiangsheng stage play. On May 1, 2005, Ni died by suicide. Xia was widely blamed for his death amid allegations that she had pressured him for marriage by threatening to expose their affair. After confirming the relationship at a press conference, Xia left Taiwan and was effectively blacklisted from the entertainment industry.

=== Post-scandal activities ===
After being effectively blacklisted in Taiwan, Xia briefly attempted to break into Singapore. Due to her fame from the Taiwanese variety show, local promoters arranged two performances for her, both of which were met with controversy. The first incident occurred in May 2005, during two charity shows. While giving a promotional interview for the Mediacorp program Focus, Xia was angered by questions about her role in the death of Ni. She stormed out of the studio and canceled her remaining press engagements. The second incident happened in February 2006 during a Lunar New Year show. A financial dispute arose between Xia and the event organizer, who filed a police report claiming Xia had used triad connections to threaten him. Xia, in turn, claimed she had been deceived into performing without proper compensation. The controversy subsided after the organizer provided proof of payment, and Xia became unreachable to reporters.

After 2007, Xia largely withdrew from the public eye, taking on behind-the-scenes and event planning roles. Since 2013, Xia has been the honorary vice-chairperson of the New Taipei City Film and Television Actors Union. In this role, she works to promote exchanges between the entertainment industries of Taiwan and mainland China. She returned to the news in 2019 when a private high school in the United States sued her for breach of contract. The school alleged it had paid Xia more than S$20,000 to recruit students in mainland China, but she failed to recruit anyone while also expensing a similar amount in "public relations fees" with minimal documentation. The court ruled against Xia, ordering her to repay the funds.

Xia has one daughter, Fei Jing, who shortly pursued a model career before becoming her assistant.
