= Hanky Panky (2017 film) =

Taiwanese comedy film

- Theatrical release poster
- Directed by: Huang Chao-liang
- Written by: Huang Chao-liang; Chu Ke-liang; Huang Shu-yun; Chen Yi-ju
- Starring: Chu Ke-liang; Lan Cheng-lung; Aggie Hsieh
- Production company: Ideas Shine
- Distributed by: Hualien Media International
- Release date: 26 January 2017
- Running time: 110 minutes
- Country: Taiwan
- Languages: Taiwanese; Mandarin
- Budget: NT$100 million
- Box office: NT$69.3 million

Hanky Panky (Mandarin: 大釣哥) is a 2017 Taiwanese comedy film directed by Huang Chao-liang and starring Chu Ke-liang in his final film role. Lan Cheng-lung and Aggie Hsieh also star. The film was released in theaters on 26 January 2017.

== Cast ==
- Chu Ke-liang as Lan Da-diao (Brother Diao / Coach Lan)
- Lan Cheng-lung as Lan Hsiao-lung
- Aggie Hsieh as Huang Hsin-yi
- Wu Pong-fong as Black Bear
- Kenji Wu as Chang Shih-pang
- Yang Kuei-mei as Pai Hsiu-chuan
- Michael Huang as Chang Kuo-liang
- Grace Lin as Little Chili
- Hope Lin as Yen Ya-ting
- Yang Lieh as Shark
- Liao Chin-te as Shark's sidekick
- Gary Tseng as Shark's sidekick
- Ma Kuo-pi as Noodle stall owner
- Angela Lee as Lan Da-diao's wife
- Chiu Yi-feng as Water Frog
- Hsieh Chi-wen as Mouse
- Andy Bian as Four Heavenly King
- Clover Kao
- Yuan Liu as Postman

== Soundtrack ==
=== Featured song ===
No.	Title	Writer(s)	Performer	Length
1.	"Wei Ni Tie Xin Gan (movie ver.) 為你貼心肝 (電影版)"	Mao Mao	Ting Xie and Weng Li-you	03:57
2.	"Ren Sheng Lei Tai 人生擂台"	Mao Mao	Ting Xie	04:40

== Re-release ==
Hanky Panky was re-released on 26 May 2017 during the Dragon Boat Festival holiday, after strong demands by fans of the late Chu Ke-liang who launched a campaign that calls for the film to be released again in theaters. The film grossed NT$1 million in the first five days of its re-release in Taiwan.
