= Easy Fortune Happy Life =

2009 Taiwanese television series

Easy Fortune Happy Life (Chinese: 福氣又安康; pinyin: Fúqi yòu ānkāng) is a 2009 Taiwanese television series starring Lan Cheng Long, Chen Qiao En and Roy Qiu. It aired on TTV every Sunday night from June 7 to September 27, 2009, from 10:00-11:30 pm.

== Cast ==
- Lan Cheng Long as Yan Da Feng 嚴大風 (26)
- Chen Qiao En (Joe Chen) as Xie Fu An 謝福安 (25)
- Roy Qiu as Han Dong Jie 韓東杰 (25)
- Jocelyn Wang as Jiang Zhen Zhen 江珍珍 (25)

Others

- Chen Zi Xian (陳咨憲) as Xie Fu Jiu / Pi Dan 謝福久/皮蛋 (9, Fu An's younger brother)
- Ding Qiang (丁強) as Yan Yun Gao / grandpa Wang Cai 嚴雲高/旺財爺爺 (80)
  - Lan Cheng Long as young Wang Cai (20)
- Dong Zhi Cheng as Chairman Yan 嚴董士長 (48)
- Wang Juan as Yan Feng Feng 嚴鳳鳳 (46, Yan Yang's mother)
- Xiu Jie Kai as Yan Yang 嚴陽 (25, Da Feng's cousin)
- Tan Ai Zhen as Huang Chun Xiang 黃春香 (80, Fu An's grandma)
  - Chen Qiao En as young Chun Xiang (20)
- Gino as Lawyer Li
- Hsia Ching Ting as Village Chief
- Na Dou (納豆) as Pang Dai / Ru Hua 胖呆/如花
- George Zhang as Ken
- Ada Pan (潘慧如) as Kelly 凱莉
- Huang Tai-an as taxi driver
- Guo Shi Lun as A Pao 阿炮
- Guan Yong (關勇) as uncle Da / Han's adoptive father 達叔
- David Chao (趙正平) as A Bao 阿保 (uncle Da's son)
- Du Shi Mei (杜詩梅) as Mrs. Wang 汪太太
- Adriene Lin as veterinarian

== Production credits ==
- Screenwriter: Chen Xin Yi, Sun Xiang Yun (孫向妘), Lu Yi Hua (陸亦華), Wang Yu Qi (王玉琪), Zou Wei Gang (鄒維剛), Jian You Ping (簡佑玶), Huang Ji Rou (黃繼柔), Hu Ning Yuan (胡寧遠)
- Producer: Chen Yu Shan, Hu Jia Jun (胡佳君)
- Director: Liu Jun Jie

== Episode Ratings ==
According to Cinatimes Showbiz, ratings ranged between 3.34 and 4.54.

Date	Episode	Ratings
2009-Jun-07	1	3.99
2009-Jun-14	2	4.09
2009-Jun-21	3	3.90
2009-Jun-28	4	4.36
2009-Jul-05	5	4.54
2009-Jul-12	6	3.92
2009-Jul-19	7	4.05
2009-Jul-26	8	4.06
2009-Aug-02	9	4.07
2009-Aug-09	10	4.12
2009-Aug-16	11	4.34
2009-Aug-23	12	4.22
2009-Aug-30	13	3.69
2009-Sep-06	14	3.50
2009-Sep-13	15	3.34
2009-Sep-20	16	3.91
2009-Sep-27	17	4.29
Average		4.02
