= Astro Note =

Japanese anime television series

- Key visual

アストロノオト (Asutoro Nōto)
- Genre: Romantic comedy, science fiction
- Created by: Shochiku
- Anime television series
- Directed by: Shinji Takamatsu (chief); Haruki Kasugamori
- Written by: Kimiko Ueno
- Music by: Kōhei Munemoto
- Studio: Telecom Animation Film
- Licensed by: Crunchyroll (streaming); SA/SEA: Medialink
- Original network: Tokyo MX, BS Asahi, KBS Kyoto, SUN, TVh, AT-X
- Original run: April 5, 2024 – June 21, 2024
- Episodes: 12
- icon

Astro Note (Japanese: アストロノオト, Hepburn: Asutoro Nōto) is an original Japanese anime television series produced by Telecom Animation Film. It is directed by Haruki Kasugamori and written by Kimiko Ueno, with Shinji Takamatsu serving as chief director and Kōhei Munemoto composing the music. Original character designs are provided by Eisaku Kubonouchi, while Maho Aoki adapts the designs for animation. The series aired from April to June 2024.

== Plot ==
Takumi, a gifted chef, was just let go from his job. He lands a gig at an old boarding house called Astro-sou, owned by a beautiful and charming landlady, Mira. He is won over, and takes the job despite learning he must live there full time. The two begin working together, and their connection deepens.

One day, while cooking for everyone, Takumi finally learns Mira's true identity: she is the crown princess of Planet Widi and she came to Astro-sou to find "the key" so that she can return to her planet and be crowned as its queen. Takumi decides to help her, and to keep Mira's identity a secret from the other tenants. The story follows the daily life of the Astro-sou residents and how Takumi helps Mira in finding the "key".

== Characters ==
Mira Gotokuji (豪徳寺 ミラ, Gōtokuji Mira)
Voiced by: Maaya Uchida
The heroine. She is the landlady of the inn. She is actually an alien, who is the crown princess of her planet. Mira eventually learns from her mother Adara that she visited earth a long time ago and meet a human man named Tasuke, both fell in love but Adara was forced back to her planet and was pregnant with Mira. Mira learns that Tasuke is her father, making Mira half-human or half-earthling.
Takumi Miyasaka (宮坂 拓己, Miyasaka Takumi)
Voiced by: Soma Saito
The main protagonist. He is an aspiring chef, who takes up a job as the resident cook at the inn. He has a crush on Mira, but his liking to her causes him to behave foolishly sometimes. Otherwise he is very capable in most aspects of his life.
Ren Wakabayashi (若林 蓮, Wakabayashi Ren)
Voiced by: Rie Kugimiya
A young boy currently attending elementary school.
Tomihiro Wakabayashi (若林 富裕, Wakabayashi Tomihiro)
Voiced by: Tomokazu Sugita
Ren's father. An unemployed, easygoing man who loves liquor.
Shokichi Yamashita (山下 正吉, Yamashita Shōkichi)
Voiced by: Shin-ichiro Miki
Astro Lodge's oldest resident. He was personally acquainted with the previous landlord.
Teruko Matsubara (松原 照子, Matsubara Teruko)
Voiced by: Ai Furihata
Aoi Uemachi (上町 葵, Uemachi Aoi)
Voiced by: Yui Ogura
An introverted young woman who lives in the closed-off room 7.
Naosuke (ナオスケ)
Voiced by: Junichi Suwabe
Mira's "pet dog". In reality, he's an alien from the same planet as Mira, and her bodyguard for life. It is revealed that since his race lives longer than Mira's, one day he'll have to learn to live a life without her.
Shoin Ginger (ショーイン・ジンジャー, Shōin Jinjā)
Voiced by: Jun Fukuyama
Oba-chan (おばちゃん)
Voiced by: Kujira

== Production ==
The series aired from April 5 to June 21, 2024, on Tokyo MX and other networks. The opening theme song is "Hohoemi Nōto" (ホホエミノオト, Hohoemi Note; "Smile Note"), performed by Ai Furihata, while the ending theme song is "Kokoro no Kagi" (ココロのカギ; "Key to the Heart"), performed by Maaya Uchida and Soma Saito. Crunchyroll streamed the series. Medialink has licensed the series in South and Southeast Asia and is streaming it on the Ani-One Asia YouTube channel.

== Episodes ==
No.	Title (Note: Every episode is untitled but all the titles are taken from Crunchyroll.)	Directed by (Note: Information is taken from the ending credits of each episode.)	Written by	Storyboarded by	Original release date
1	"Episode 1"; Transliteration: "Dai-ichi-wa" (Japanese: 第1話)	Shinji Takamatsu, Haruki Kasugamori	Kimiko Ueno	Shinji Takamatsu, Haruki Kasugamori	April 5, 2024
In the premiere, Takumi, intrigued by a job ad, visits 'Asutoro-sou,' a breakfast-centric sharehouse instead of a restaurant. Impressed by the residents' enjoyment of his cooking and charmed by landlady Mira, Takumi decides to become the live-in chef. Yet, he soon discovers hidden truths about the residents and Mira.
2	"Episode 2"; Transliteration: "Dai-ni-wa" (Japanese: 第2話)	Kim Min-sun	Kimiko Ueno	Yūichirō Yano, Yamato Yuka	April 12, 2024
Viewers delve into Mira and Naosuke's Earth backstory. Mira, now 'Asutoro-sou's' landlady, seeks the elusive 'key' for her royal lineage. A breakfast theft prompts investigation, while Ren captures a mysterious cleaning robot, causing a power outage. Mira and Takumi are trapped, and a mysterious character claiming to be Mira's fiancé emerges, heightening intrigue.
3	"Episode 3"; Transliteration: "Dai-san-wa" (Japanese: 第3話)	Yasuro Tsuchiya	Kimiko Ueno	Nobuo Tomizawa	April 19, 2024
Mira's fiancé turns out to be her childhood friend, Shoin Ginger, and their engagement was a childhood joke. Shoin informs Mira that their enemies, the Goshians, know about their search for the key on Earth and decides to stay to help her. Naosuke sets up a hidden CCTV camera to catch the real breakfast thief after being wrongly accused. Ren has a school field trip and needs a lunchbox, which Takumi makes for him. When the lunchbox goes missing, Takumi makes another one, but Ren goes on the trip feeling sad. With Shoin's help and his advanced vehicle disguised as a car, Takumi and Mira drive to Ren's field trip location. There, they encounter a Goshian robot trying to steal the second lunchbox, mistakenly thinking it contains the key. Naosuke's camera captures a mysterious figure stealing the lunchbox.
4	"Episode 4"; Transliteration: "Dai-yon-wa" (Japanese: 第4話)	Keiko Oyamada	Kimiko Ueno	Keiko Oyamada	April 26, 2024
5	"Episode 5"; Transliteration: "Dai-go-wa" (Japanese: 第5話)	Kim Min-sun	Kimiko Ueno	Yūichirō Yano, Yamato Yuka	May 3, 2024
6	"Episode 6"; Transliteration: "Dai-roku-wa" (Japanese: 第6話)	Nobuo Tomizawa	Kimiko Ueno	Nobuo Tomizawa	May 10, 2024
7	"Episode 7"; Transliteration: "Dai-nana-wa" (Japanese: 第7話)	Yasuro Tsuchiya	Kimiko Ueno	Yoshitomo Yonetani	May 17, 2024
8	"Episode 8"; Transliteration: "Dai-hachi-wa" (Japanese: 第8話)	Yuka Yamato	Kimiko Ueno	Yūichirō Yano	May 24, 2024
9	"Episode 9"; Transliteration: "Dai-kyū-wa" (Japanese: 第9話)	Kim Min-sun	Kimiko Ueno	Nobuo Tomizawa	May 31, 2024
10	"Episode 10"; Transliteration: "Dai-jū-wa" (Japanese: 第10話)	Yūichirō Yano, Haruki Kasugamori	Kimiko Ueno	Chikara Sakurai	June 7, 2024
11	"Episode 11"; Transliteration: "Dai-jūichi-wa" (Japanese: 第11話)	Yasuro Tsuchiya, Shinji Takamatsu	Kimiko Ueno	Yoshitomo Yonetai, Shinji Takamatsu	June 14, 2024
12	"Episode 12"; Transliteration: "Dai-jūni-wa" (Japanese: 第12話)	Shinji Takamatsu, Haruki Kasugamori	Kimiko Ueno	Shinji Takamatsu, Haruki Kasugamori	June 21, 2024
