= Chocolat (manga) =

Manga by Eisaku Kubonouchi

ショコラ (Shokora)
- Manga
- Written by: Eisaku Kubonouchi
- Published by: Shogakukan
- Magazine: Big Comic Spirits
- Original run: 1999 – 2003
- Volumes: 7
- Television drama
- Original network: MBS, TBS
- Original run: May 26, 2003 – July 25, 2003
- Episodes: 45
- Television drama

流氓蛋糕店
- Directed by: Toyoharu Kitamura
- Studio: Comic Productions
- Original network: TTV Main Channel
- Original run: January 10, 2014 – April 4, 2014
- Episodes: 13

Chocolat (ショコラ, Chokora; French for "Chocolate") is a Japanese manga series written and illustrated by Eisaku Kubonouchi and serialized in the magazine Big Comic Spirits. The series has 45 episodes. It was adapted into a Japanese television drama in 2003 and a Taiwan television series in 2013.

== Synopsis ==
Chocolat is a mature comedy series about half-orphan Tatsumi Chiyoko, whose father was caught up in huge debt. Now living with Omugi Matsukichi, an ex-underground king who opened a pastry shop, she gets to know people like Katou Ichigo, an ex-inmate. With people after her father's whereabouts, what will happen to her?

== Taiwan Television Series ==
=== Cast ===
- Masami Nagasawa
- Lan Cheng Long
- Kim Woo Bin

== Japanese Television Drama ==
=== Cast ===
- Otsuka Chihiro
- Isao Natsuyagi
- Kazuya Takahashi
- Sei Hiraizumi
