= Jeannie Hsieh =

Taiwanese singer-songwriter, dancer, actress, and model

- 謝金燕
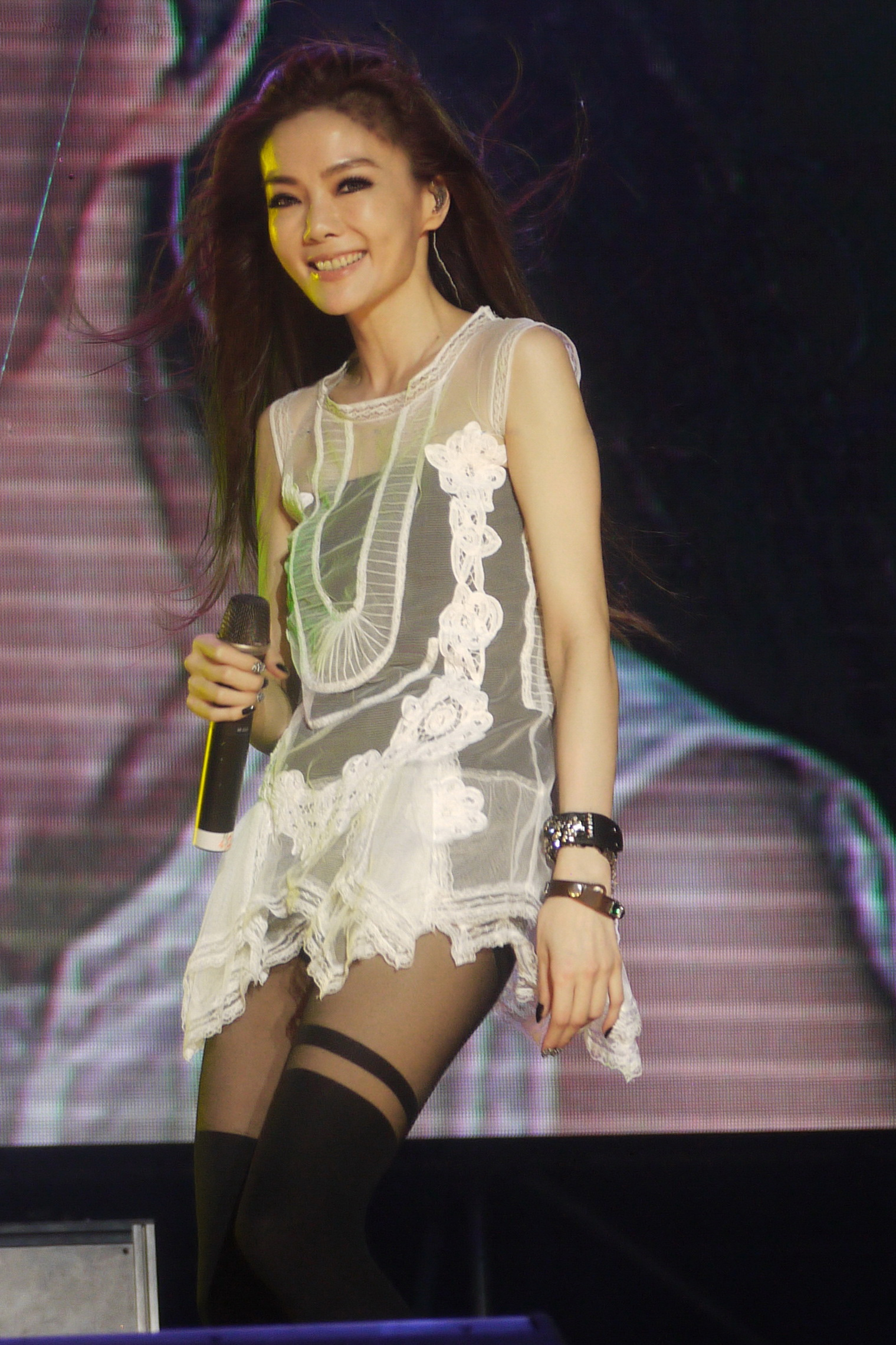
- Jeannie Hsieh performs in 2013
- Born: December 25, 1974 (age 51); Zuoying, Kaohsiung, Taiwan
- Other names: Sister (Jie Jie, 姐姐)
- Occupations: singer-songwriter; dancer; actress; model
- Years active: 1990–present
- Father: Chu Ke-liang
- Awards: Golden Melody Awards – Best Female Taiwanese Artist; 2007 Provocative; Best Female Taiwanese Artist; 2012 The Crescent Moon

Chinese name
- Traditional Chinese: 謝金燕
- Simplified Chinese: 谢金燕
Transcriptions
Standard Mandarin
- Hanyu Pinyin: Xiè Jīnyàn
- Musical career
- Origin: Taipei, Taiwan
- Genres: Hokkien pop; dance; techno; hip hop
- Instrument: vokal (mezzo-soprano)
- Years active: 1993–present
- Labels: Yourong Records, Walter Records, Qiankun Records

Jeannie Hsieh (Chinese: 謝金燕; born December 25, 1974) is a Taiwanese singer-songwriter, dancer, actress, and model. She is known for writing and performing electronic dance music which combines techno and hip-hop, as well as synth-pop, house, bubblegum with slow sentimental ballads, often in Taiwanese Hokkien, but sometimes mixed with Mandarin, Cantonese, and English. She became an idol to fans in both Taiwan and China. The music video for Hsieh's 2013 single Sister (姐姐) has been viewed over 33 million times on YouTube.

== Career ==
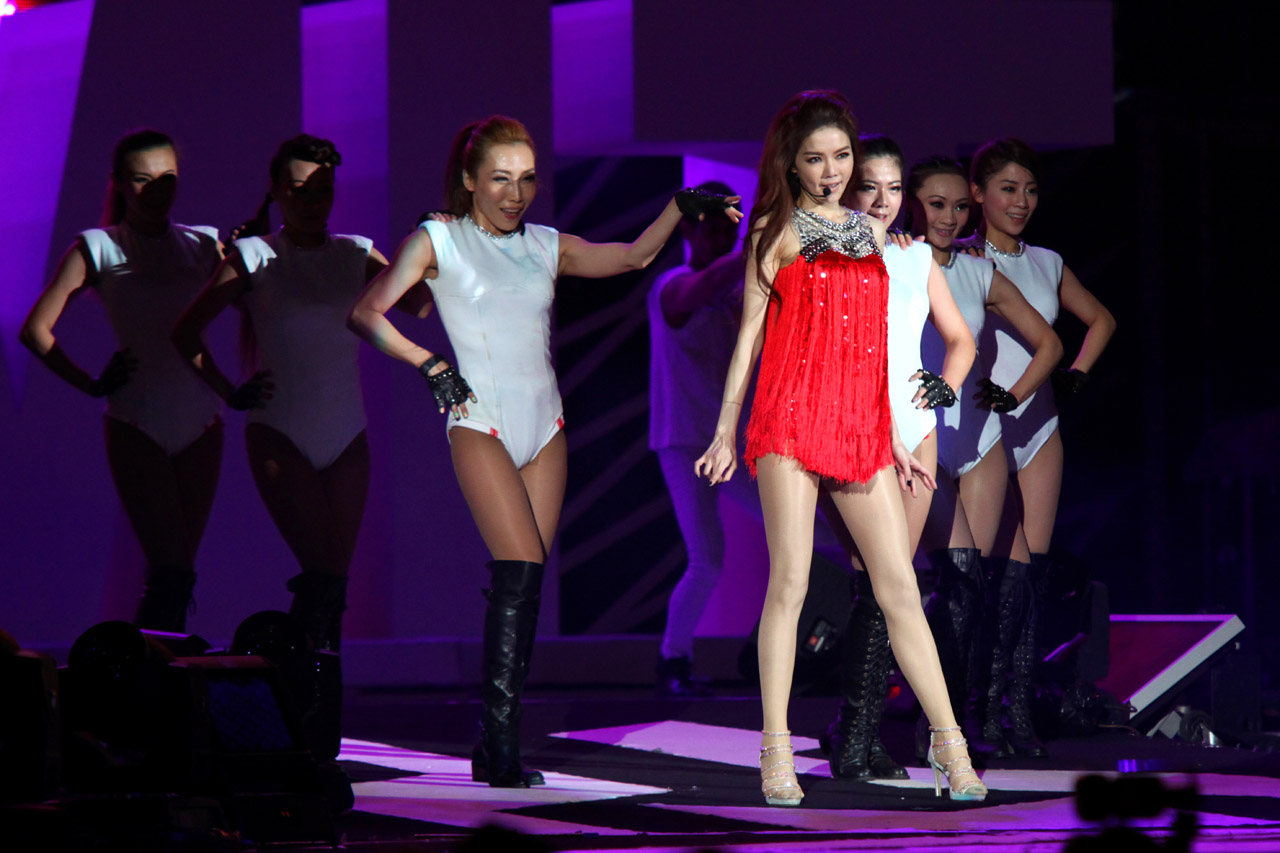
Jeannie Hsieh at Taipei new year's party, December 31, 2013.

At the end of 1989, Hsieh made her debut in a variety television shows Happy Weekend Party and Miss The Most Beautiful Legs on the channel CTS, having passed the selection, hiding whose daughter she was. She also played in performances and films Shao ye dang da bing (1990) and Dragon Ball: The Magic Begins (1991). She announced the return in June 1993 and her first album in Mandarin Yoy Are Cool (你真酷) was released in August. Starting with the next album Infatuation in the Air (癡情一場空) in December 1994, she switched to the Hokkien language. Her combination electronic and hip-hop music with Taiwanese Hokkien lyrics was a revolution-like, as before it Hokkien-language music dominated by sad ballads and poignant break-up songs.

The first hit become the song Tears While Dancing Cha Cha (含淚跳恰恰) from the third album of the same name (1995). For the album 2006 Provocative (嗆聲) in 2007 she received 18th Golden Melody Awards, nomination "Best Female Taiwanese Artist", setting a precedent for the recognition of Hokkien dance music. Hsieh received a similar award in 2012 for the album 2011 The Crescent Moon (月彎彎). In addition, in 2009 she was awarded by Southeast Music Chart Awards. The music video for Hsieh's 2013 single Sister (姐姐) has been viewed over 33 million times on YouTube (25 million in 2013).

On May 14, 2016, Hsieh announced during a concert in Taiwan that she would take a break from show business to take care of her mother. On December 31, 2017, the premiere of the single Turn Mask (Turn口罩) took place, a song that became relevant during the ensuing COVID-19 pandemic.

In the 2000s, she starred in several television series, including Sky and Earth Has Affection, The Unforgettable Memory, and Unique Flavor, as well as in the film 2018 How to Train Our Dragon (originally With five sisters, I'm destined to be single). The New York Times posted a photo of her from a photo shoot in Milan on its fashion Instagram page. In 2013 she received Elle Style Awards from the magazine Elle as the "Most Stylish Singer".

== Personal life ==
Hsieh's parents, father, Taiwanese comedian, Chu Ke-liang and mother, Lin Jian-ru, divorced and Hsieh was brought up by her mother.

On December 21, 1991, Hsieh was involved in a near–fatal car accident, receiving multiple fractures. Her physician advised her to give birth before the age of 30. Her friend, actress Fang Yu, defended Hsieh for having a child out of wedlock (in 2009).

In March 2017, Hsieh and her father declared an end to a long–running feud between them and they apologized to each other. Her father subsequently died in May 2017.

== Discography ==
Albums

Waiting for the new on December 31, 2020.

- Dream Of Flying (造飛機) (02/08/2012)
- The Crescent Moon (Yue Wan Wan, 月彎彎) (November 23, 2011)
- Hot Love (愛你辣) (September 17, 2010)
- 54321 (December 31, 2007)
- Provocative (Qiang Sheng, 嗆聲) (02/06/2006)
- Dancing Queen (Lian Wu Gong, 練舞功) (07/05/2005)
- Mo Qi, 默契 (01/06/2004)
- YOYO Sisters (YOYO Zi Mei, YOYO姊妹) (01/11/2002)
- Yong Yuan Ai Ni, 永遠愛你 (01/10/2001)
- Bu tong kuan de san kuan qing! 燕子，放乎飛! (September 27, 2001)
- Fall in Love (談戀愛) (12/07/1999)
- Ku Jiu Luo Hou, 苦酒落喉 (01/05/1996)
- Tears While Dancing Cha Cha (含淚跳恰恰) (10/1995)
- Infatuation in the Air (癡情一場空) (12/1994)
- Yoy Are Cool (Ni Zhen Ku, 你真酷) (01/08/1993)

Singles

- Stitch Dance Music 2013 (Tiao Zhen Wu Qu 2013, 跳針舞曲2013) (August 14, 2013)

Digital singles

- Turn Mask (Turn口罩) (January 1, 2018)
- Bung X Party (Bung X Pa, 蹦X趴) (December 30, 2015)
- Yao Fa Da (August 27, 2014)
- Sister (Jie Jie, 姐姐) (June 29, 2013)
