= Shin-ichiro Miki =

Japanese voice actor (born 1968)

- 三木眞一郎
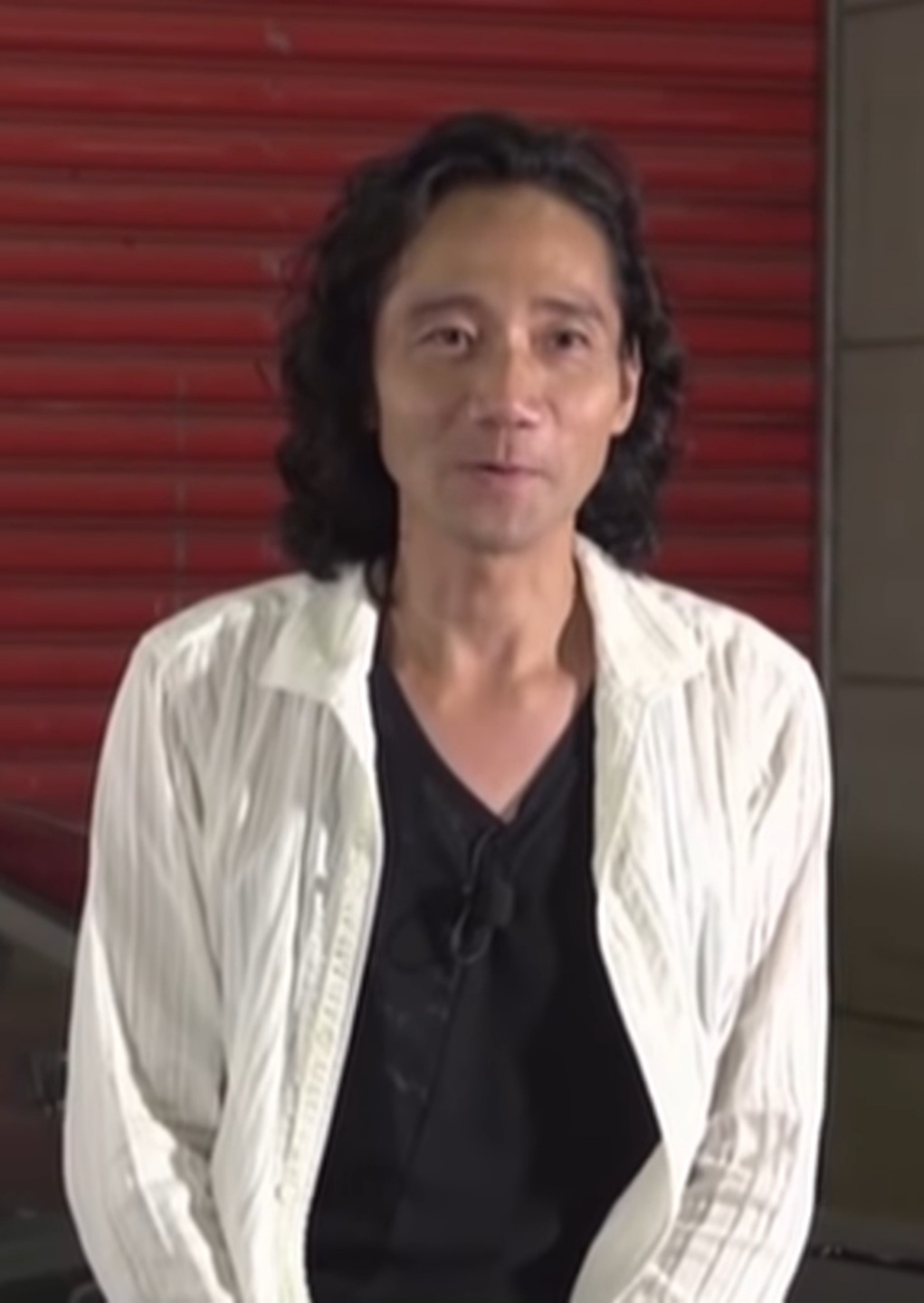
- Miki in 2020
- Born: March 18, 1968 (age 58); Tokyo, Japan
- Occupation: Voice actor
- Years active: 1989–present
- Agent: 81 Produce
- Children: Kazuma Miki (son)
- Website: www.miki-ha.com

Shin-ichiro Miki (三木眞一郎, Miki Shin'ichirō; born March 18, 1968) is a Japanese voice actor from Tokyo. He is a member of 81 Produce.

Miki is known for his distinctively smooth voice and often calm delivery in the roles he has landed. He often gets cast as handsome young men in anime, perhaps the most notable being Youji Kudou – Balinese (Weiß Kreuz) and Kojirō ("James") (Pokémon). Other famous roles include Takumi Fujiwara (Initial D anime, video game and mostly Arcade Stage series from Arcade Stage 4 to Arcade Stage 8 Infinity), Kisuke Urahara (Bleach), Akira Yuki (Virtua Fighter), Lockon Stratos (Mobile Suit Gundam 00), Tatsuma Sakamoto (Gintama), Teppei Iwaki (Area no Kishi), Aikurō Mikisugi (Kill la Kill), Hitomi (Code: Breaker), Kagetora Aida (Kuroko's Basketball), Roy Mustang (Fullmetal Alchemist: Brotherhood), Zamasu (Dragon Ball Super), Bob Makihara (Tenjho Tenge), Keisuke Yuuki (Fushigi Yuugi) and Deishū Kaiki (Monogatari Series).

Miki is also a singer among the four-man band Weiß, along with Takehito Koyasu, Tomokazu Seki and Hiro Yūki, the four main voice actors of Weiß Kreuz. Miki is also very active in BL dramas. He won Best Actor in supporting roles in the 4th Seiyu Awards.

As well as voicing Kojirō, Miki (alongside Mika Kanai, Satomi Kōrogi, Unshō Ishizuka and many other Japanese voice actors) also appears in the Japanese and English versions of Pokémon, where he voiced many of the titular creatures such as Misty's Staryu, Brock's Zubat/Golbat/Crobat and Ash's Charizard.

He is also a friend of Koichi Yamadera. His son, Kazuma, followed his father's footsteps as a voice actor at age 19 and joined the same agency as him on February 3, 2025.

== Filmography ==
=== Television animation ===
| Year | Title | Role | Notes | Source |
|---|---|---|---|---|
| 1994 | Aoki Densetsu Shoot! | Rudy Erick (First) | | |
| 1994 | Captain Tsubasa J | Genzo Wakabayashi | | |
| 1995 | Fushigi Yūgi series | Keisuke Yūki | | |
| 1995 | Virtua Fighter series | Akira Yuki | | |
| 1996 | The Vision of Escaflowne | Allen Schezar/Susumu Amano | | |
| 1997 | Pocket Monsters | Kojirō (James), Satoshi's Hitokage/Lizardo/Lizardon (Ash's Charmander/Charmeleon/Charizard), Takeshi's Isitsubute (Brock's Geodude), Takeshi's Zubat (Brock's Zubat), Kasumi's Hitodeman (Misty's Staryu) | | |
| 1998 | Weiss Kreuz | Youji Kudou | | |
| 1998 | Initial D First Stage | Takumi Fujiwara | | |
| 1999 | Kaikan Phrase | Yukifumi "Yuki" Todo | | |
| 1999 | Initial D Second Stage | Takumi Fujiwara | | |
| 1999 | Pocket Monsters: Episode Orange Archipelago | Kojirō (James), Satoshi's Lizardon (Ash's Charizard), Takeshi's Isitsubute (Brock's Geodude), Takeshi's Zubat (Brock's Zubat), Kasumi's Hitodeman (Misty's Staryu), Kasumi's Nyoromo/Nyorozo/Nyorotono (Misty's Poliwag) | | |
| 1999 | Pocket Monsters: Episode Gold & Silver | Kojirō (James), Satoshi's Lizardon (Ash's Charizard), Takeshi's Isitsubute (Brock's Geodude), Takeshi's Zubat/Golbat/Crobat (Brock's Zubat/Golbat/Crobat), Kasumi's Hitodeman (Misty's Staryu), Kasumi's Nyoromo/Nyorozo/Nyorotono (Misty's Poliwag/Poliwhirl/Politoed) | | |
| 2000 | Descendants of Darkness | Asato Tsuzuki | | |
| 2000 | Gravitation | Taki Aizawa | | |
| 2000 | Mewtwo! I Am Here | Kojirō (James), Takeshi's Isitsubute (Brock's Geodude), Takeshi's Golbat (Brock's Golbat), Kasumi's Hitodeman (Misty's Staryu), Kasumi's Nyorozo (Misty's Poliwhirl), Mewtwo's Lizardontwo (Mewtwo's Charizardtwo/Clone Charizard) | | |
| 2001 | Shaman King | Krysler | | |
| 2002 | Naruto | Mizuki | | |
| 2002 | Pocket Monsters Side Stories | Kojirō (James), Takeshi's Isitsubute (Brock's Geodude), Takeshi's Crobat (Brock's Crobat) | | |
| 2002 | Pocket Monsters: Advanced Generation | Kojirō (James), Satoshi's Lizardon (Ash's Charizard), Satoshi's Cotoise (Ash's Torkoal), Takeshi's Isitsubute (Brock's Geodude), Takeshi's Crobat (Brock's Crobat), Shū's Flygon (Drew's Flygon) | | |
| 2002 | Full Metal Panic! | Kurz Weber | | |
| 2002 | Tokyo Underground | Seki | | |
| 2003 | Air Master | Shigeo Komada | | |
| 2003 | Full Metal Panic? Fumoffu | Kurz Weber | | |
| 2003 | Detective Conan | Kenji Hagiwara | | |
| 2004 | Bleach | Kisuke Urahara | | |
| 2004 | Gakuen Alice | Persona/Rei Serio | | |
| 2004 | Initial D Fourth Stage | Takumi Fujiwara | | |
| 2004 | Tenjho Tenge | Bob Makihara | | |
| 2005 | Tsubasa: RESERVoir CHRoNiCLE | Toya | | |
| 2005 | Black Cat | Creed Diskenth | | |
| 2005 | Kyo Kara Maoh! | Shinou | | |
| 2005 | Sukisho | Shinichiro Minato | | |
| 2005 | Full Metal Panic! The Second Raid | Kurz Weber | | |
| 2005 | Harukanaru Toki no Naka de | Minamoto no Yorihisa | | |
| 2005 | Samurai Champloo | Moronobu Hishikawa | | |
| 2006 | Fate/stay night | Assassin | | |
| 2006 | Gakuen Heaven | Yukihiko Naruse | | |
| 2006 | .hack//Roots | Kuhn | | |
| 2006 | Gintama | Tatsuma Sakamoto | | |
| 2006 | D.Gray-man | Bak Chan | | |
| 2006 | The Mastermind of Mirage Pokémon | Kojirō (James), Kasumi's Hitodeman (Misty's Staryu) | | |
| 2006 | Pocket Monsters: Diamond and Pearl | Kojirō (James), Satoshi's Naetle/Hayashigame/Dodaitose (Ash's Turtwig/Grotle/Torterra), Shinji's Donkarasu (Paul's Honchkrow), Jun's Mukuhawk (Barry's Staraptor), Saturn's Dokurog (Saturn's Toxicroak) | | |
| 2007 | Strait Jacket | Leiot Steinberg | | |
| 2007 | Wangan Midnight | Tatsuya Shima | | |
| 2007 | Darker than Black | Eric Nishijima | | |
| 2007 | Mobile Suit Gundam 00 | Neil Dylandy, Lyle Dylandy | | |
| 2008 | Mobile Suit Gundam 00 Second Season | Lyle Dylandy | | |
| 2008 | Antique Bakery | Yusuke Ono | | |
| 2008 | Golgo 13 | Katz Double | Ep. 11 | |
| 2009 | Fullmetal Alchemist: Brotherhood | Roy Mustang | | |
| 2010 | Hakuōki | Hijikata Toshizo | | |
| 2010 | The Betrayal Knows My Name | Tachibana Giou | | |
| 2010 | Pocket Monsters: Best Wishes! | Kojirō (James), Dent's Ishizumai/Iwapalace (Cilan's Dwebble/Crustle), Shooty's Tsutarja (Trip's Snivy) | | |
| 2011 | Gintama' | Tatsuma Sakamoto | | |
| 2011 | No. 6 | You Ming | | |
| 2011 | Carnival Phantasm | Assassin | | |
| 2012 | Area no Kishi | Teppei Iwaki | | |
| 2012 | Initial D Fifth Stage | Takumi Fujiwara | | |
| 2012 | Kuroko's Basketball | Kagetora Aida | | |
| 2012 | Magi: The Labyrinth of Magic | Ithnan / Markkio | | |
| 2012 | Nisemonogatari | Deishū Kaiki | | |
| 2012 | Pocket Monsters: Best Wishes! Season 2 | Kojirō (James), Dent's Iwapalace (Cilan's Crustle) | | |
| 2013 | Code: Breaker | Hitomi | | |
| 2013 | Hajime No Ippo: Rising | Sawamura Ryūhei | | |
| 2013 | Hunter × Hunter | Knov | | |
| 2013 | Kill la Kill | Aikurō Mikisugi | | |
| 2013 | Monogatari Series Second Season | Deishū Kaiki | | |
| 2013 | Pocket Monsters: Best Wishes! Season 2: Episode N | Kojirō (James), Satoshi's Hitokage/Lizardo/Lizardon (Ash's Charmander/Charmeleon/Charizard), Dent's Iwapalace (Cilan's Crustle) | | |
| 2013 | Pocket Monsters: Best Wishes! Season 2: Decolora Adventure | Kojirō (James), Satoshi's Lizardon (Ash's Charizard), Dent's Iwapalace (Cilan's Crustle) | | |
| 2013 | Pocket Monsters: XY | Kojirō (James), Satoshi's Luchabull (Ash's Hawlucha), Tierno's Kameil (Tierno's Wartortle) | | |
| 2013 | Pocket Monsters: The Origin | Red's Hitokage/Lizardo/Lizardon (Red's Charmander/Charmeleon/Charizard) | | |
| 2014 | Donten ni Warau | Naoto Kagami | | |
| 2014 | Trinity Seven | Master Biblia | | |
| 2014 | Black Bullet | Shouma Nagisawa | | |
| 2014 | Amagi Brilliant Park | Jaw | | |
| 2014 | Initial D Final Stage | Takumi Fujiwara | | |
| 2014 | Haikyu!! | Oiwake Takurō (Date Tech Coach) | | |
| 2014 | Log Horizon | K R | | |
| 2015 | Gintama° | Tatsuma Sakamoto | | |
| 2015 | Tai-Madō Gakuen 35 Shiken Shōtai | Sōgetsu Ōtori | | |
| 2015 | The Seven Deadly Sins | Slader | | |
| 2015 | Fate/Stay Night - Unlimited Blade Works | Assassin | | |
| 2015 | One-Punch Man | Snek | | |
| 2015 | Pocket Monsters: XY&Z | Kojirō (James), Satoshi's Luchabull (Ash's Hawlucha) | | |
| 2016 | Dragon Ball Super | Zamasu | | |
| 2016 | One Piece | Pedro | | |
| 2016 | Concrete Revolutio | Magotake Hitoyoshi | | |
| 2016 | Bungo Stray Dogs | André Gide | | |
| 2016 | Pocket Monsters: Sun & Moon | Kojirō (James), Glazio's Lugarugan (Gladion's Lycanroc) | | |
| 2016 | Mob Psycho 100 | Megumu Koyama | | |
| 2017 | March Comes in Like a Lion | Kai Shimada | 2 seasons | |
| 2017 | Yōjo Senki: Saga of Tanya the Evil | Erich von Lergen | | |
| 2017 | Symphogear AXZ | Adam Weishaupt | | |
| 2017 | Two Car | Coach Tanabashi | | |
| 2018 | Hugtto! PreCure | Ristle | | |
| 2018 | Bakumatsu | Ryouma Sakamoto | | |
| 2018 | Legend of the Galactic Heroes: Die Neue These | Walter von Schönkopf | | |
| 2018 | Lord of Vermilion: The Crimson King | Kāku Kaburagi | | |
| 2019 | Isekai Quartet | Erich von Lergen | | |
| 2019 | No Guns Life | Danny Yo | | |
| 2019 | Fate/Grand Order - Absolute Demonic Front: Babylonia | Leonidas I | | |
| 2019 | Demon Slayer: Kimetsu no Yaiba | Tanjuro Kamado | | |
| 2019 | Bakumatsu Crisis | Ryouma Sakamoto | | |
| 2019 | Bakugan: Battle Planet | Benton Dusk | | |
| 2019 | My Hero Academia 4 | Sir Nighteye | | |
| 2020 | Breakers | Ren Narita | | |
| 2020 | Dorohedoro | Turkey | | |
| 2020 | Super HxEros | Jō Anno | | |
| 2020 | Bakugan: Armored Alliance | Benton Dusk | | |
| 2020 | The Misfit of Demon King Academy | Zorro Angato | | |
| 2020 | The God of High School | Oh Seong Jin | | |
| 2020 | Sleepy Princess in the Demon Castle | Hypnos | | |
| 2021 | Welcome to Demon School! Iruma-kun Season 2 | Ari | | |
| 2021 | I'm Standing on a Million Lives Season 2 | Canteele | | |
| 2021 | Life Lessons with Uramichi Oniisan | Yusao Furode | | |
| 2021 | Detective Conan: Police Academy Arc | Kenji Hagiwara | | |
| 2021 | Dragon Quest: The Adventure of Dai | Hym | | |
| 2022 | Shaman King | Yohken Asakura | | |
| 2022 | Salaryman's Club | Tatsuru Miyazumi | | |
| 2022 | Estab Life: Great Escape | Urura | | |
| 2022 | RWBY: Ice Queendom | Roman Torchwick | | |
| 2022 | Shine On! Bakumatsu Bad Boys! | Sōgen | | |
| 2022 | Reincarnated as a Sword | Master | | |
| 2022 | Bleach: Thousand-Year Blood War | Kisuke Urahara | | |
| 2023 | The Fire Hunter | Haijū | | |
| 2023 | My Home Hero | Yoshitatsu Matori | | |
| 2023 | The Marginal Service | Theodore Tompson | | |
| 2023 | Summoned to Another World for a Second Time | Regulus | | |
| 2023 | Mashle: Magic and Muscles | Innocent Zero | | |
| 2023 | Undead Girl Murder Farce | Sherlock Holmes | | |
| 2023 | Dark Gathering | Imprisoned Martyr/Breakwater of the Pacific | Ep. 13, 15 | |
| 2023 | Shy | Stardust | | |
| 2023 | The Saint's Magic Power Is Omnipotent 2nd Season | Seiran | | |
| 2023 | Bullbuster | Kōji Tajima | | |
| 2023 | Rurouni Kenshin | Espiral Rotation | | |
| 2024 | Fluffy Paradise | God | | |
| 2024 | Ishura | Kuze the Passing Disaster | | |
| 2024 | Astro Note | Shokichi Yamashita | | |
| 2024 | Grandpa and Grandma Turn Young Again | Shozo | | |
| 2024 | I Parry Everything | Sig | | |
| 2024 | The Magical Girl and the Evil Lieutenant Used to Be Archenemies | Cat Familiar | | |
| 2024 | Delico's Nursery | Klaus | | |
| 2024 | Uzumaki | Shuichi Saito | | |
| 2024 | The Healer Who Was Banished From His Party, Is, in Fact, the Strongest | Ronaldo | | |
| 2024 | The Prince of Tennis II: U-17 World Cup Semifinal | Antonio da Medanoré | | |
| 2024 | Beastars Final Season | Yahya | | |
| 2025 | I Have a Crush at Work | Hiromi Kiribayashi | | |
| 2025 | I'm the Evil Lord of an Intergalactic Empire! | Yasushi | | |
| 2025 | Apocalypse Hotel | Environment Checker Robot | | |
| 2026 | Hikuidori | Tōgorō | | |
| 2026 | Noble Reincarnation: Born Blessed, So I'll Obtain Ultimate Power | Gilbert Ararat | | |
| 2026 | Scum of the Brave | Kiyoto Takamiya | | |
| 2026 | Jujutsu Kaisen Season 3 | Atsuya Kusakabe | | |
| 2026 | Frieren: Beyond Journey's End Season 2 | Revolte | | |
| 2026 | Sentenced to Be a Hero | Boojum | | |
| 2026 | Daemons of the Shadow Realm | Ivan Yosano | | |
| 2026 | Akane-banashi | Ryu'un Kenputei | | |
| 2026 | Yōjo Senki: Saga of Tanya the Evil II | Erich Rerugen | | |
| 2026 | Mission: Yozakura Family | Asa | Episode 47 | |

=== Original net animation ===
| Year | Title | Role | Notes | Source |
|---|---|---|---|---|
| 2015 | Comical Psychosomatic Medicine | Ryō Shinnai | | |
| 2021 | Star Wars: Visions | Zhima | Episode: "The Ninth Jedi" | |
| 2026 | Dandelion | Free Isobe | | |
| 2026 | Star Wars: Visions Presents – The Ninth Jedi | Zhima | | |

=== Original video animation (OVA) ===
| Year | Title | Role | Notes | Source |
|---|---|---|---|---|
| 1998 | Tekken: The Motion Picture | Lee Chaolan | | |

=== Animated films ===
| Year | Title | Role | Notes | Source |
|---|---|---|---|---|
| 1994 | Fatal Fury: The Motion Picture | Laocorn Gaudimus | | |
| 1998 | Pocket Monsters films | Kojirō (James) | | |
| 2001 | Initial D Third Stage | Takumi Fujiwara | | |
| 2011 | Fullmetal Alchemist: The Sacred Star of Milos | Roy Mustang | | |
| 2014 | Expelled from Paradise | Dingo | | |
| 2015 | The Empire of Corpses | Alexei Karamazov | | |
| 2015 | Harmony | Elliya Vashirof | | |
| 2016 | New Initial D the Movie | Old Takumi | | |
| 2017 | Fireworks, Should We See It from the Side or the Bottom? | | | |
| 2017 | Kuroko's Basketball The Movie: Last Game | Kagetora Aida | | |
| 2018 | I Want to Eat Your Pancreas | Haruki's father | | |
| 2019 | Saga of Tanya the Evil: The Movie | Erich Rerugen | | |
| 2019 | Kabaneri of the Iron Fortress: The Battle of Unato | Kageyuki | | |
| 2020 | My Tyrano: Together, Forever | | | |
| 2020 | A Whisker Away | Kakinuma | | |
| 2021 | Jujutsu Kaisen 0 | Atsuya Kusakabe | | |
| 2022 | Bubble | Kantō Mad Lobster | | |
| 2025 | Demon Slayer: Kimetsu no Yaiba – The Movie: Infinity Castle | Tanjuro Kamado | | |
| 2026 | Armored Trooper VOTOMS: Die Graue Hexe | Alix Barrack | | |

=== Video games ===
| Year | Title | Role | Notes | Source |
|---|---|---|---|---|
| 1994 | Virtua Fighter 2 | Akira Yuki | | |
| 1996 | Fighters Megamix | Akira Yuki | | |
| 1996 | Street Fighter Zero 2 | Sagat, Announcer | | |
| 1996 | Street Fighter Zero 2 Alpha | Sagat, Announcer | | |
| 1996 | Virtua Fighter 3 | Akira Yuki | | |
| 1998 | Sakura Wars 2: Thou Shalt Not Die | Shiro Amakasa | | |
| 1998 | Street Fighter Zero 3 | Sagat | | |
| 1998 | Thousand Arms | Soushi Mahoroba | | |
| 1998 | Ehrgeiz | Sephiroth | | |
| 1999 | Super Smash Bros. | Lizardon (Charizard) | | |
| 1999 | Pokémon Snap | Lizardon (Charizard) | | |
| 1999 | Arc the Lad III | Velhart | | |
| 1999 | The Legend of Dragoon | Albert | | |
| 2000 | Mega Man Legends 2 | Jiji | | |
| 2000 | Capcom vs. SNK: Millennium Fight 2000 | Sagat | | |
| 2001 | Super Smash Bros. Melee | Lizardon (Charizard), Hitodeman (Staryu), Hassam (Scizor) | | |
| 2001 | Capcom vs. SNK 2 | Sagat | | |
| 2002 | Kingdom Hearts | Aladdin | | |
| 2002 | Grandia Xtreme | Evann | | |
| 2003 | Initial D Special Stage | Takumi Fujiwara | | |
| 2006 | Initial D Arcade Stage 4 | Takumi Fujiwara | | |
| 2006 | Last Escort | Akira Takami | | |
| 2006 | Fate/stay night Réalta Nua | Assassin | | |
| 2008 | Super Smash Bros. Brawl | Lizardon (Charizard), Hitodeman (Staryu) | | |
| 2008 | Star Ocean: The Second Evolution | Lucifer | | |
| 2008 | Tales of Hearts | Creed Graphite | | |
| 2008–14 | Hakuōki series | Hijikata Toshizo | | |
| 2009 | Initial D Arcade Stage 5 | Takumi Fujiwara | | |
| 2010 | Zangeki no Reginleiv | Volundr | | |
| 2010 | The Legend of Heroes: Trails from Zero | Randolph Orlando | | |
| 2011 | El Shaddai: Ascension of the Metatron | Enoch | | |
| 2011 | Initial D Arcade Stage 6 AA | Takumi Fujiwara | | |
| 2011 | The Legend of Heroes: Trails to Azure | Randolph Orlando | | |
| 2012 | Dead or Alive 5 | Akira Yuki | | |
| 2012 | Initial D Arcade Stage 7 AAX | Takumi Fujiwara | | |
| 2012 | E.X. Troopers | Regan Watts, Kreis Ravel (Young) | | |
| 2012 | Project X Zone | Akira Yuki | | |
| 2013 | God Eater 2 | Haruomi Makabe | | |
| 2013 | JoJo's Bizarre Adventure: All Star Battle | Gyro Zeppeli | Also R | |
| 2013 | Tales of Hearts | Creed Graphite | | |
| 2014 | Dengeki Bunko: Fighting Climax | Akira Yuki | | |
| 2014 | Initial D Arcade Stage 8 ∞ (Infinity) | Takumi Fujiwara | | |
| 2014 | Lost Dimension | Soujirou Sagara | | |
| 2014 | Danganronpa Another Episode: Ultra Despair Girls | Haiji Towa | | |
| 2014 | Assassin's Creed Unity | Arno Victor Dorian (Japanese dub) | | |
| 2014 | Super Smash Bros. for Nintendo 3DS and Wii U | Lizardon (Charizard), Hitodeman (Staryu), Darkrai | | |
| 2015 | JoJo's Bizarre Adventure: Eyes of Heaven | Gyro Zeppeli | | |
| 2015 | Project X Zone 2 | Akira Yuki | | |
| 2015 | Fate/Grand Order | Leonidas I, Sasaki Kojirō, Paracelsus, Fion Mac Cumhail | | |
| 2015 | Psycho-Pass: Mandatory Happiness | Takuma Tsurugi | | |
| 2016 | Seven Knights | Rudy | | |
| 2016 | Summon Night 6: Lost Borders | Seiron | | |
| 2016 | World of Final Fantasy | Edgar Roni Figaro | Also Maxima | |
| 2017 | Nioh | Sanada Yukimura | | |
| 2017 | The Lost Child | Enoch, Leon Danta | | |
| 2017 | The Legend of Heroes: Trails of Cold Steel III | Randolph Orlando | non-playable | |
| 2017 | Fire Emblem Heroes | Bruno | | |
| 2017 | .hack//G.U.: Last Recode | Kuhn | | |
| 2018 | Super Smash Bros. Ultimate | Lizardon (Charizard), Akira Yuki (archive recording) | | |
| 2018 | The Legend of Heroes: Trails of Cold Steel IV | Randolph Orlando | | |
| 2018 | Xenoblade Chronicles 2: Torna – The Golden Country | Minoth | | |
| 2019 | Kill la Kill: IF | Aikuro Mikisugi | | |
| 2019 | Granblue Fantasy | Gunther | non-playable | |
| 2020 | Persona 5 Strikers | Hasegawa Zenkichi | | |
| 2020 | Fist of the North Star Legends ReVIVE | Akira Yuki | | |
| 2020 | The Legend of Heroes: Trails into Reverie | Randolph Orlando | | |
| 2020 | Shin Megami Tensei Nocturne HD Remaster | Lucifer (Old Gentleman form) | | |
| 2020 | The King of Fighters All Star | Rudy | | |
| 2021 | Cookie Run: Kingdom | Millennial Tree Cookie | | |
| 2022 | Arknights | Mr.Lee | | |
| 2023 | Honkai: Star Rail | Blade | | |
| 2025 | Silver and Blood | Cain | | |
| 2025 | Wuthering Waves | Qiuyuan | | |
| 2026 | Fatal Fury: City of the Wolves | Laocorn Gaudeamus | | |
| 2027 | Honkai: Nexus Anima | Blade | | |

=== Live-action ===
| Year | Title | Role | Network | Notes | Source |
|---|---|---|---|---|---|
| 2020 | Yell | Actor | NHK | Asadora | |

=== Tokusatsu ===
| Year | Title | Role | Notes | Source |
|---|---|---|---|---|
| 2007 | Kamen Rider Den-O | Sieg | Ep. 23-24, 49 | |
| 2009 | Kamen Rider Decade | Sieg | Ep. 15 | |
| 2013-2014 | Kamen Rider Gaim | Genesis Driver equipment's voice | | |
| 2022 | Ultra Galaxy Fight: The Destined Crossroad | Ultraman Jack | | |
| 2023-2024 | Ohsama Sentai King-Ohger | Kamejim | | |

=== Dubbing roles ===
==== Live-action ====
| Title | Role | Dub for | Notes | Source |
|---|---|---|---|---|
| Mutt Boy | Cha Chul-min | Jung Woo-sung | | |
| A Moment to Remember | Choi Chul-soo | Jung Woo-sung | | |
| Sad Movie | Lee Jin-woo | Jung Woo-sung | | |
| Daisy | Park Yi | Jung Woo-sung | | |
| The Restless | Yi-gwak | Jung Woo-sung | | |
| Padam Padam | Yang Kang-chil | Jung Woo-sung | | |
| The King | Han Kang-shik | Jung Woo-sung | | |
| Beasts Clawing at Straws | Tae-young | Jung Woo-sung | | |
| Jane Eyre | Edward Rochester | Michael Fassbender | | |
| X-Men: First Class | Erik Lehnsherr / Magneto | Michael Fassbender | | |
| X-Men: Days of Future Past | Erik Lehnsherr / Magneto | Michael Fassbender | | |
| X-Men: Apocalypse | Erik Lehnsherr / Magneto | Michael Fassbender | | |
| Dark Phoenix | Erik Lehnsherr / Magneto | Michael Fassbender | | |
| The Legend of Bagger Vance | Rannulph Junuh | Matt Damon | | |
| The Bourne Identity | Jason Bourne | Matt Damon | 2006 Fuji TV edition | |
| The Bourne Ultimatum | Jason Bourne | Matt Damon | 2009 Fuji TV edition | |
| Jason Bourne | Jason Bourne | Matt Damon | 2022 BS TV Tokyo edition | |
| 28 Days Later | Jim | Cillian Murphy | | |
| Against the Dark | Dylan | Daniel Percival | | |
| Backrooms | Phil | Mark Duplass | | |
| Bad Education | Juan/Ángel Andrade/Zahara | Gael García Bernal | | |
| The Bay | Sean Meredith | Jonas Armstrong | | |
| Big | Kang Kyung-joon / Seo Yoon-jae | Gong Yoo | | |
| A Big Bold Beautiful Journey | David | Colin Farrell | | |
| By the Sea | François | Melvil Poupaud | | |
| The Company | Josh Williams | James Franco | | |
| The Deaths of Ian Stone | Ian Stone | Mike Vogel | | |
| DMZ | Parco Delgado | Benjamin Bratt | | |
| Don't Worry Darling | Frank | Chris Pine | | |
| Elementary | Sherlock Holmes | Jonny Lee Miller | | |
| Epic Movie | Peter Pervertski | Adam Campbell | | |
| Existenz | Ted Pikul | Jude Law | | |
| The Exorcist: Believer | Pastor Don Revans | Raphael Sbarge | | |
| The Fast and the Furious: Tokyo Drift | Lieutenant Boswell | Brian Goodman | 2025 The Cinema edition | |
| Felicity | Ben Covington | Scott Speedman | | |
| Final Destination | Alex Browning | Devon Sawa | | |
| The Flying Scotsman | Graeme Obree | Jonny Lee Miller | | |
| Focus | Garriga | Rodrigo Santoro | | |
| Funny Games | Paul | Michael Pitt | | |
| Genius | Teenage Hans Albert Einstein | | | |
| Gone Baby Gone | Patrick Kenzie | Casey Affleck | | |
| Gran Turismo | Danny Moore | Orlando Bloom | | |
| Grease | Danny Zuko | John Travolta | | |
| Hackers | Emmanuel Goldstein/Cereal Killer | Matthew Lillard | | |
| Hairspray | Link Larkin | Zac Efron | | |
| A Haunting in Venice | Dr Leslie Ferrier | Jamie Dornan | | |
| House of Fury | Jason | Daniel Wu | | |
| Inception | Robert Fischer | Cillian Murphy | | |
| Ip Man 2 | Wong Leung | Huang Xiaoming | | |
| Killers | Spencer Aimes | Ashton Kutcher | | |
| Last Days | Blake | Michael Pitt | | |
| The Legend of 1900 | 1900 | Tim Roth | | |
| A Little Chaos | André Le Nôtre | Matthias Schoenaerts | | |
| My Life Without Me | Don | Scott Speedman | | |
| New Police Story | Joe Kwan | Daniel Wu | | |
| Night of the Living Dead | Johnny | Russell Streiner | 2022 Blu-ray edition | |
| October Sky | Homer Hickam | Jake Gyllenhaal | | |
| Plunkett & Macleane | Captain James Macleane | Jonny Lee Miller | | |
| Pokémon Detective Pikachu | Roger Clifford | Chris Geere | | |
| Rebecca | George Fortescue Maximilian "Maxim" de Winter | Laurence Olivier | New Era Movies edition | |
| Revenge | Nolan Ross | Gabriel Mann | | |
| The Saint | Ilya Tretiak | Valery Nikolaev | | |
| Saturday Night Fever | Anthony "Tony" Manero | John Travolta | | |
| Scream (1996) | Billy Loomis | Skeet Ulrich | | |
| Scream (2022) | Billy Loomis | Skeet Ulrich | | |
| Scream VI | Billy Loomis | Skeet Ulrich | | |
| She-Hulk: Attorney at Law | Emil Blonsky / Abomination | Tim Roth | | |
| Shinjuku Incident | Jie | Daniel Wu | | |
| Sleepy Hollow | Ichabod Crane | Tom Mison | | |
| Tai Chi Hero | Mad Monk | Daniel Wu | | |
| Ted | Rex | Joel McHale | | |
| This Is Going to Hurt | Adam Kay | Ben Whishaw | | |
| Turistas | Alex | Josh Duhamel | | |
| Underworld | Michael Corvin | Scott Speedman | | |
| Underworld: Evolution | Michael Corvin | Scott Speedman | | |
| Vertical Limit | Peter Garrett | Chris O'Donnell | | |
| Wanted | The Repairman | Marc Warren | 2019 BS Japan edition | |
| White Squall | Gil Martin | Ryan Phillippe | | |
| The Young Victoria | Prince Albert of Saxe-Coburg and Gotha | Rupert Friend | | |

==== Animation ====
| Title | Role | Notes | Source |
|---|---|---|---|
| Adventure Time | Mr. Pig | | |
| Aladdin | Aladdin | Speaking voice in 2008 Japanese dub, succeeding Kenji Haga | |
| Castlevania | Alucard | | |
| Despicable Me 4 | Perry Prescott | | |
| The Emoji Movie | Steven | | |
| Legends of Oz: Dorothy's Return | The Scarecrow | | |
| Lightyear | Mo Morrison | | |
| The Mystical Laws | Yuchika | | |
| RWBY | Roman Torchwick | | |
| Thomas the Tank Engine & Friends | Arthur | From season 11 onwards, succeeding Yasuhiro Takato | |

=== Other media ===
- From Far Away (彼方から) CD Drama (1999): Izark Kia Tarj
- Hatoful Boyfriend CD Drama (2012): Tohri Nishikikouji
