= Kang Kang =

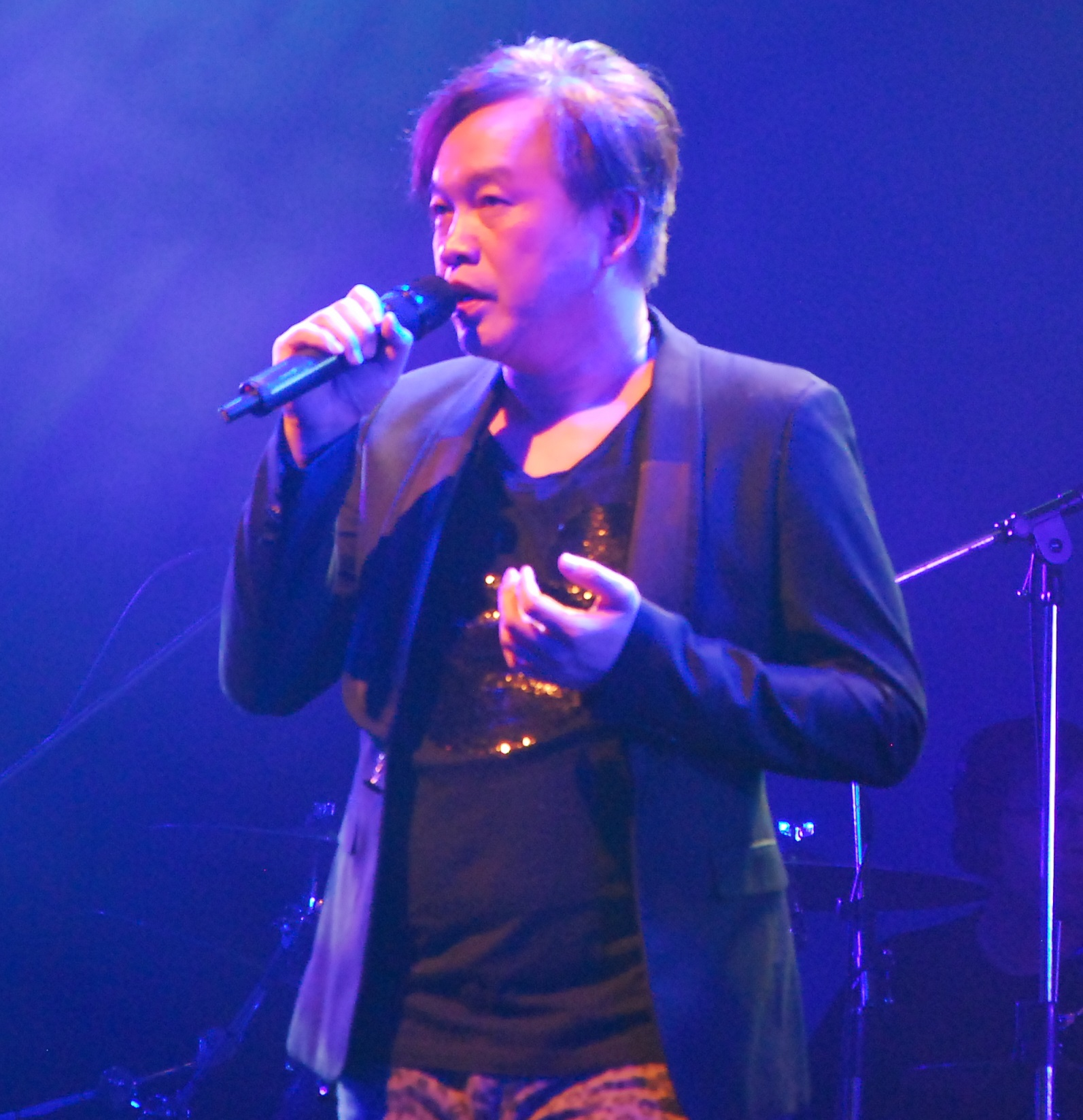
- Taiwanese New Wave Taipei Show Kang Kang Live Concert, 2014
- Born: Kang Ching-jung; 2 May 1967 (age 58); Fongshan, Kaoshiung, Taiwan
- Spouse: Zhang Jiapei (m. 2011)
- Children: 2

Chinese name
- Chinese: 康康
Transcriptions
Standard Mandarin
- Hanyu Pinyin: Kāng Jìnróng
- Musical career
- Also known as: Kang Kang (康康)
- Origin: Taiwan

Kang Ching-jung (Chinese: 康晋榮; pinyin: Kāng Jìnróng) (born 2 May 1967), or commonly known as Kang Kang (Chinese: 康康; pinyin: Kāng Kāng), is a Taiwanese entertainer, singer and television host. He was discovered by Chang Fei during a TV performance.

== Early life ==
Before television, Kang switched jobs many times. He was first a military policeman, a salesman and then a pub singer. His band entered a singing contest in 1997 and won first place. They released an EP in the same year.

== Career ==
In 1998 Kang began his career in entertainment. Chang Fei praised Kang for his quick-witted performance on Dragon Brother, Tiger Brother, and agreed to mentor Kang. Kang later met and began working with Jacky Wu.

Kang released his first album, Tears Inducing (催淚), in June 1999. The album was a mild success. However, Kang's songwriting was overshadowed by his obnoxious TV image as a comedian who used foul language, impersonation, and slapstick humor.

The general public focused primarily on his on-screen presence, saying that Kang's singing lacked magic. The reason for that was Kang's public image. Critics had pounded him as "ugly looking and badly dressed, with a tumbling voice that can't speak with proper volume and speed." Kang worked to improve his voice command and speed, which eventually paid off. His popularity increased as he gained more TV exposure with Wu's support. They appeared in hits such as TV Citizen, Electric Playground, and Let's Handcuff Him.

In 2000, Kang released his second album, Happy Birdy Days (快樂鳥日子). The response was overwhelming and produced many classic songs, such as "Happy Birdy Days". In 2001, Kang released his third album, Dream Come True (圓夢), and achieved mild success. Following was a 2002 live album, Kang Kang's Special (康康的濕背秀).

Kang co-hosted with Jackie Wu on the show Sunday Night 8 o' Clock (周日八點黨).

In 2005, Kang released his fifth album, Who Gives a Damn About Your Mother's Marriage (管你媽媽嫁給誰). It did poorly. In the same year, Kang hit a low with his TV career, as he was kicked off from Chang Fei's show Big Brother in Showbizz (綜藝大哥大) due to creative differences.

In the spring of 2006, Kang Kang reinvented his long-term negative image by losing some weight and concentrating on his TV shows. He has toured with Frankie Kao and Jacky Wu as "The Three Hard Tenors".

Kang Kang was romantically involved with his TV assistant Zhang Jiapei. They married in 2011 and have one son in 2013 and a daughter in 2019.
