= Bullbuster =

Japanese multimedia franchise

- First novel volume cover

ブルバスター (Burubasutā)
- Genre: Mecha
- Created by: Hiroyuki Nakao; P.I.C.S.
- Novel series
- Written by: Hiroyuki Nakao
- Illustrated by: Eisaku Kubonouchi
- Published by: Kadokawa
- Original run: December 27, 2018 – September 29, 2023
- Volumes: 3
- Anime television series
- Directed by: Hiroyasu Aoki
- Written by: Hiroyasu Aoki
- Music by: Masahiro Tokuda
- Studio: NUT
- Licensed by: Crunchyroll; SA / SEA: Medialink
- Original network: AT-X, Tokyo MX, Kansai TV, BS NTV, TVQ Kyushu
- Original run: October 4, 2023 – December 20, 2023
- Episodes: 12
- Manga
- Written by: Hiroyuki Nakao; P.I.C.S.
- Illustrated by: Hishio Itami
- Published by: Media Factory
- Magazine: Monthly Comic Flapper
- Original run: October 5, 2023 – present
- Volumes: 1

Bullbuster (Japanese: ブルバスター, Hepburn: Burubasutā) is a Japanese multimedia franchise by Kadokawa. Originating as a concept book released in November 2017, it later received a novel series written by Hiroyuki Nakao and illustrated by Eisaku Kubonouchi. An anime television series adaptation produced by NUT aired from October to December 2023. A manga adaptation by Hishio Itami began serialization in October 2023.

== Characters ==
The staff of Namidome Industries.

Tetsurō Okino (沖野鉄郎, Okino Tetsurō)
Voiced by: Shōya Chiba
A mech designer and pilot from Kanie Technologies who developed the Bullbuster and is transferred to Namidome Industries to help train their pilots in its use.
Arumi Nikaidō (二階堂アル美, Nikaidō Arumi)
Voiced by: Asami Seto
One of Namidome Industries' pilots. She has an unfriendly personality and is often alone.
Kōji Tajima (田島鋼二, Tajima Kōji)
Voiced by: Shin-ichiro Miki
The President of Namidome Industries, who is dedicated to exterminating the Giant Beasts so that Ryugan Island's population can reclaim their lost homes.
Miyuki Shirogane (白金みゆき, Shirogane Miyuki)
Voiced by: Yūki Takada
The general affairs manager of Namidome Industries.
Ginnosuke Mutō (武藤 銀之助, Mutō Ginnosuke)
Voiced by: Taiten Kusunoki
One of Namidome Industries' pilots, who is rather old fashioned and is skeptical about the Bullbuster.
Kintarō Kataoka (片岡 金太郎, Kataoka Kintarō)
Voiced by: Ken Uo
The accountant for Namidome Industries who is a stickler for proper procedure and paperwork. He has an irritable personality and often gets angry.
Shūichi Namari (鉛 修一, Namari Shūichi)
Voiced by: Yuma Uchida

== Media ==
=== Print ===
The franchise originated as a concept book released at Comitia122 on November 23, 2017, and later at Comiket.

A series of novels, written by Hiroyuki Nakao and illustrated by Eisaku Kubonouchi, was published from December 27, 2018, to September 29, 2023.

A manga series for the franchise illustrated by Hishio Itami began serialization in Media Factory's seinen manga magazine Monthly Comic Flapper on October 5, 2023.

==== Novels ====
No.	Japanese release date	Japanese ISBN
1	December 27, 2018	978-4-04-735421-0
2	September 5, 2019	978-4-04-735716-7
3	September 29, 2023	978-4-04-737661-8

==== Manga ====
No.	Japanese release date	Japanese ISBN
1	June 21, 2024	978-4-04-683652-6
2	June 23, 2025	978-4-04-684706-5

=== Anime ===
An anime television series for the franchise was announced on November 18, 2022. It is written and directed by Hiroyasu Aoki and produced by NUT, with Takahisa Katagiri adapting Kubonouchi's original designs for animation, Junji Okubo serving as mechanical designer, and Masahiro Tokuda composing the music. The series aired from October 4 to December 20, 2023, on AT-X and other networks. The opening theme song, "Try-ry-ry" (トライ・ライ・ライ, Tra・Lai・Lai) is performed by NORISTRY, while the ending theme song, "Tearful Shout" (頑張れと叫ぶたび, Ganbare to Sakebu tabi), is performed by Konomi Suzuki. Crunchyroll streamed the series outside of Asia. Medialink licensed the series in Asia-Pacific and is streaming it on Ani-One Asia YouTube channel.

==== Episodes ====
No.	Title (Note: All English titles are taken from Crunchyroll.)	Directed by (Note: Information is taken from the ending credits of each episode.)	Written by	Storyboarded by	Original release date
1	"Bullbuster, Activate! A Small Business on the Verge of Bankruptcy Challenges a Mysterious Monster?!"; Transliteration: "Burubasutā Kidō! Gakeppuchi Chūshō Kigyō ga Tachimukau no Wa, Nazo no Bakemono!?" (Japanese: ブルバスター起動！崖っぷち中小企業が立ち向かうのは、謎のバケモノ！？)	Yoshihisa Iida	Hiroyasu Aoki	Hiroyasu Aoki	October 4, 2023
In the near future, Ryugan Island off the coast of Japan is infested with giant beasts, forcing the population to evacuate. In order to deal with the giant beasts, pest control companies like Namidome Industries employ the use of giant robots to exterminate them. Tetsurō Okino is transferred to Namidome Industries to train them in the use of the next generation mech Bullbuster. He meets Kōji Tajima, Miyuki Shirogane, and Ginnosuke Mutō when an alert goes out of a giant beast on the loose. However, Kintarō Kataoka forces Okino to sign an employment contract first before he can deploy. Okino is then sent to Ryugan Island with Muto and Arumi Nikaidō. While Okino searches for the giant beast, Muto and Arumi attempt to repair the company's older generation mech, Bullrover, which was damaged and left behind after a previous battle. The giant beast then attacks, but Okino and Arumi are able to work together to exterminate it.
2	"No Money! No Ship, Either?! The Only Way To Survive Is to Rebrand Namidome!"; Transliteration: "Kimu ga Nai! Fune Monai!? Kishikaisei no Ichi te wa "Namitome Burando ka Keikaku"?" (Japanese: 金がない！船もない！？起死回生の一手は「波止ブランド化計画」？)	Satoshi Matsubara	Hiroyasu Aoki	Hiroyasu Aoki	October 11, 2023
Okino returns from his successful mission, but is chewed out by Kataoka warning him limit the use of weapons due to the cost of ammunition. Okino then accompanies Muto to deliver the giant beast's corpse to Shiota Bio, led by Mitsuru Inomata. However, despite dissecting numerous Giant Beast corpses, Shiota Bio has not been able to learn anything substantive about them and Inomata suggest they try to capture a live specimen next time. Muto explains that when giant beasts first appeared on Ryugan Island, they were considered wild animals, and since the island was evacuated due a gas leak, the government has shown little interest in addressing the issue, leaving the job to Namidome Industries. Meanwhile, Kataoka warns Tajima that not only can they barely afford the cost of maintaining Bullbuster and Bullrover, but the local Builders' Union is pressuring the local fisheries to cease loaning their boats to Namidome Industries, which would cut them off from Ryugan Island. Tajima decides to enlist the help of some of Okino's friends to rebrand the company to let the Builders' Union know they aren't in competition. The rebranding is successful with the company getting a new, modernized logo, which begins attracting increased attention online.
3	"Okino Steps in It! The Islanders are Angry...In the Company's Hour of Need, Its President Stands Tall!"; Transliteration: "Okino, Dai Shittai! Areru Tōmintachi...Kaisha Sonbō no Kiki ni, Shachō ga Tachiagaru!" (Japanese: 沖野、大失態！荒れる島民達...会社存亡の危機に、社長が立ち上がる！)	Hidetoshi Watanabe	Hiroyasu Aoki	Hiroyasu Aoki	October 18, 2023
Okino finds out that he accidentally uploaded the wrong video to the company website, showing him battling against the giant beasts. Tajima and Kataoka explain that Namidome Industries is legally required to keep the existence of the Giant Beasts a secret from the public to prevent the government from meddling in the reconstruction of Ryugan Island. Tajima and Kataoka then meet with Shinya Shikauchi, the head of their parent company Shiota Chemical, to explain themselves. Shikauchi praises them for their successful damage control of the incident but reminds them their company should be turning a profit. They also meet with the Islanders, who are growing increasingly frustrated at the lack of progress on reclaiming the island. Muto then checks in on Okino, who is considering resigning due to his mistake, but Muto talks him out of it. Tajima comes to the realization that the Giant Beasts are likely producing the gas that forced the evacuation of the island, so exterminating the Giant Beasts would solve both problems. That night, Arumi heads to the island to hunt a Giant Beast, but when she confronts it, she cannot bring herself to shoot it and it escapes.
4	"The Incredible Operation to Capture a Giant Beast Alive Begins!"; Transliteration: "Arumi, Namida no Riyū...Zendaimimon no "Kaiju Ikedori Sakusen" Kaishi!" (Japanese: アル美、涙の理由...前代未聞の「巨獣生け捕り作戦」開始！)	Mitsuhiro Ōgata; Satoshi Matsubara	Hiroyasu Aoki	Umi Fujisawa; Yoshihiro Kanno	October 25, 2023
Tajima and Muto consider trying to capture the Giant Beast Arumi encountered since it is still relatively small, but Kataoka warns that they don't have the funds to build a new trap, and they still don't have a boat. Meanwhile, Arumi visits Okina to view his recording of his first mission, where she catches sight of the smaller Giant Beast, and comes to the realization that is actually her old dog Shiro which has somehow mutated into a Giant Beast. Okino manages to convince his coworker Yoshi Kameyama to build a trap for Arumi as a personal favor, while Namidome Industries is able to secure a new boat from a charitable patron. Arumi and Muto head to the island to set the trap, but a Giant Beast attacks streamer trespassing on the island. Muto takes the trespasser to safety but is wounded in the process while Arumi uses Bullbuster to try and keep the Giant Beast from escaping into the sea. With no other choice, Okino takes the Bullrover to the island and helps Arumi kill the Giant Beast. Afterwards, the trap successfully captures Shiro.
5	"We Can Count on Manpower! The Help of a Young Researcher Reveals the Truth of the Giant Beasts?!"; Transliteration: "Tayoreru no Wa Manpawā! Wakaki Kenkyūsha no Kyōryoku de, Tsuini Kaiju no Shōtai Hakkaku!?" (Japanese: 頼れるのはマンパワー！若き研究者の協力で、ついに巨獣の正体発覚！？)	Yasuyuki Fuse	Hiroyasu Aoki	Takaharu Ozaki	November 1, 2023
Shiota Bio studies Shiro and confirm that the Giant Beasts are animals native to Ryugan Island that are somehow being mutated. However, Inomata refuses to dedicate any more time for research unless Namidome Industries can compensate them. Meanwhile Kataoka accepts an offer from President Kanie to host an intern for one month, since he can fill in for Muto while he recovers at the hospital. However, Okino immediately grows jealous upon hearing that the new intern graduated from prestigious college. A Shiota Bio scientist, Nagisa Mizuhara arrives and reveals she had been studying Shiro for her own personal interests. She found traces of algae on Shiro, suggesting that the island's sole lake may hold the key to the presence of the Giant Beasts. Mizuhara provides a lab mouse with a tracker in hopes of being able to observe the Giant Beast mutation process in real time. Okino and Arumi then head to the island to release the mouse. Okino heads for the lake in Bullbuster, but suddenly gets mired in mud, risking him getting trapped when Bullbuster runs out of power. Thankfully, he comes up with the idea to use the nearby trees as a brace to free himself from the mud. Upon returning to the office, Okino intrudes on the new intern's interview. Due to Okino being covered in mud, the intern mistakes him for a sewer worker, which angers him.
6	"The New Star Employee is a Problem Child?! Okino Snaps at the Cold-Hearted Smarty-Pants!"; Transliteration: "Kitai no Shinjin wa Mondaiji!? Kōritsu Sai Yūsen no Reitetsu Interi ni, Okino ga Kireru!" (Japanese: 期待の新人は問題児！？効率最優先の冷徹インテリに、沖野がキレる！)	Yoshihisa Iida	Hiroyasu Aoki	Yoshihisa Iida; Yoshihiro Kanno	November 8, 2023
The new intern, Shuichi Namari, is properly introduced to everybody though Okino still dislikes him. Meanwhile, Mizuhara quietly tracks the progress of the lab mouse while Arumi visits Shiro. A new Giant Beast is then detected on the island, but Namari refuses to operate the boat since interns are not allowed to work overtime hours. Once Arumi returns, they confirm the new Giant Beast is the lab mouse and she and Okino head to the island to capture it. Mizuhara rushes back to Shiota Bio when she hears that Shiro's condition has suddenly worsened. Okino is forced to kill the Giant Beast to protect Arumi, who learns afterwards that Shiro had passed away. Analyzing the video data, Mizuhara learns that the mouse fell into the lake shortly before it mutated, leading Tajima and Okino to secure an aquatic robot with little success. Tajima and Kataoka then learn that Namari was pawned off to them by Shiota Chemical because nobody liked working with him due to his overly logical attitude. Okino then complains to Tajima about Namari, and then gets into an argument with Namari when he overhears. Meanwhile, Shiro is apparently still alive and breaks out of his containment.
7	"Shiro Loses Control! Can They Save Their Stranded Companions? Bullbuster's First Urban Battle!"; Transliteration: "Shiro, Bōsō! Tojikomerareta Nakama o Sukueru ka? Burubasutā Hatsu no Shigaichisen!" (Japanese: シロ、暴走！閉じ込められた仲間を救えるか？ブルバスター初の市街地戦！)	Satoshi Matsubara	Muri Sasaki	Hiroyasu Aoki; Yoshihiro Kanno	November 15, 2023
Okino manages to find an aquatic mech for sale, but even at a discounted rate of 3 million yen, it is still beyond Namidome Industries' ability to purchase. Arumi and Tajima head to Shiota Bio after Mizuhara tells them that Shiro as actually still alive. However, when they arrive, they find Shiro has already broken out his containment box. They and Inomata are narrowly able to escape the rampaging Shiro and Tajima calls Okino to deploy in Bullbuster. Okino, Muto, and Namari head to Shiota Bio and make a plan to capture Shiro, but Namari refuses to participate and leaves. Shiro manages to break out of the building and escape in a nearby canal, with Bullbuster being disabled after it falls into the water. Downstream, Shiro emerges to attack Namari, but Arumi arrives in time to kill Shiro with a speargun. Afterwards, Namari comes up with a plan to crowdfund the purchase of the aquatic mech, and also reveals he anonymously polled the islanders who responded with an overwhelming majority supporting revealing the existence of Giant Beasts to the public. Namari then approaches Okino and asks him to teach him how to pilot Bullbuster.
8	"Muto Roars! The Sorrows of a Man Left Behind by Time... And What Does Shiota Have Up Its Sleeve?"; Transliteration: "Hoeyo mutō! Jidai ni Torinokosareta Otoko no Hiai...Soshite Dai Kigyō Shiota no Omowaku to wa?" (Japanese: 吠えよ武藤！時代に取り残された男の悲哀...そして大企業・塩田の思惑とは？)	Mitsuhiro Ōgata	Muri Sasaki	Umi Fujisawa; Yoshihiro Kanno	November 22, 2023
Okino continues having trouble securing an aquatic robot. In addition to being an able pilot, Namari also begins modernizing many of Namidome Industries' practices through the use of digital apps, much to Okino's annoyance. Tajima then reveals that Shiota Chemical is interested in providing additional funding to Namidome Industries in order to secure their desalinization plant on Ryugan Island in hopes of being able to sell its design. They meet Shiota Chemical's managing director, Joya Washizu, who will be reviewing the company. A Giant Beast alert is suddenly issued, and Washizu wishes to observe the extermination though everybody is nervous since Muto is on duty. Despite Muto's inexperience with Bullbuster and causing collateral damage to the desalinization plant, he is able to defeat the Giant Beast and Washizu decides to grant additional funding. However, in return, Namidome Industries will have to be folded into Shiota Chemical as a department focused on dealing with the Giant Beasts. While everybody is confident the company's fortunes will turn for the better, Arumi seems to have reservations about the merger.
9	"The Merger Draws Near! Shiota's Plot, and the Origin of the Giant Beasts, are Both Revealed! What will Namidome do?" Transliteration: "Susumu Gappei Keikaku! Akiraka ni Naru Shiota no Sakuryaku to, Kaiju Hassei no Genin...dō suru Namidome!?" (Japanese: 進む合併計画！明らかになる塩田の策略と、巨獣発生の原因...どうする波止！？)	Hidetoshi Watanabe	Hiroyasu Aoki	Satoshi Matsubara	November 29, 2023
With the backing of Shiota Chemical, Namidome Industries is able to purchase an aquatic mech, Bullduck. While initially overjoyed, Okino is dismayed to discover that Shiota Chemical installed an electronic lock on all of their mechs to prevent unauthorized activation. Tajima and Kataoka review the merger contract and are shocked to discover that one of Shiota Chemical's demands is to remove Muto from frontline duties. Meanwhile, Mizuhara makes a breakthrough in her research and meets with Arumi, explaining that an electrogenic bacteria in the island's lake is causing wildlife to mutate into Giant Beasts and reveals its true origins. Tajima is then contacted by Shikauchi, who warns him that Mizuhara leaked classified company data to Arumi and orders him to recover it. Tajima confronts Arumi, who reveals that the true cause of the Giant Beasts is HR-E, a nanomachine developed by Shiota Chemical to produce genetically modified electrogenic bacteria for desalination. While normally safe, HR-E had an unforeseen reaction with the island's leather coral which allows HR-E to infect living creatures and mutate them into Giant Beasts. Arumi insists that they use the data to start a full investigation into Shiota Chemical, while Kataoka warns that if they do not return the stolen data, Namidome Industries faces severe legal consequences. Confronted with this impossible situation, Tajima retreats to his office, unsure of what to do.
10	"Namidome Industries on the Verge of Collapse! A Clash of Emotions... Tajima Makes the Hard Call!"; Transliteration: "Namidome Kōgyō, Hōkai no Kiki! Kamiawanai Omoi...Tajima, Kujū no Ketsudan!" (Japanese: 波止工業、崩壊の危機！噛み合わない想い...田島、苦渋の決断！)	Hideki Tonokatsu	Hiroyasu Aoki	Yoshihisa Iida	December 6, 2023
Tajima returns the stolen data to Shiota Chemical, and while Washizu won't punish Namidome, he makes it clear that Shiota Chemical will not admit to its role in the creation of the Giant Beasts. Meanwhile, morale within Namidome is critically low as everybody realizes that the merger with Shiota Chemical was simply part of the company's plan to restrict Namidome's freedom and prevent them from independently investigating the source of the Giant Beasts. Regretting his refusal to stand up for his beliefs, Tajima decides to move forward. He formally accepts a divorce from his wife, and tells Kataoka and Mizuhara that he secretly copied the stolen data and plans to release it to the public to start an investigation. However, he then learns that Okino, Arumi, Muto, and Shirogane had decided to put their own plan into motion, livestreaming an expedition into the lake in order to drum up public attention and support. Shikuachi orders Tajima to halt the stream, but seeing how his own employees beat him to the punch, Tajima defies the order and declares that Namidome will not merge with Shiota Chemical.
11	"Namidome Strikes Back! The Secret Weapon To Resist an Evil Corporation Is... Leather Coral?!"; Transliteration: "Namidome no Gyakushū! Akutoku Dai Kigyō ni Taikō Suru Shudan wa...Umikinoko!?" (Japanese: 波止の逆襲！悪徳大企業に対抗する手段は...ウミキノコ！？)	Yoshihisa Iida	Hiroyasu Aoki	Hiroyasu Aoki; Yoshihiro Kanno	December 13, 2023
While exploring the bottom of the lake, Muto discovers both the leather coral and an underground tunnel leading to the desalination plant. However, a Giant Beast attacks them, and while they are able to kill it, Arumi is injured and must be rushed to the hospital. Unfortunately, Shiota Chemical begins making their own moves, cutting all funding to Namidome, using a troll farm to bombard the livestream with negative comments, stealing and disposing of the Giant Beast Corpse, and attempting to court the islanders to gain the rights to access the island. However, a businessman named Toramasa Takarada approaches Namidome, telling Tajima that he's willing to invest in them in order to gain access to the leather coral, which contain a rare microorganism that can cure baldness. Mizuhara then arrives, revealing she suspects Shiota Chemical is deliberately breeding Giant Beasts since their brains contain neuroparticles, which would revolutionize biological computing. Meanwhile, Namari reveals Shiota Chemical's plans to breed Giant Beasts to the islanders, which causes them to side with Namidome. However, Washizu negotiates a separate agreement with the city to gain sole rights to access the island in two days. Upon hearing this, Tajima resolves to seize the island before Shiota Chemical can.
12	"Rise, Bullbuster! All Out War Between Namidome and Shiota! Which Will Prevail: the Big Business's Logic or the Small Business's Guts?!"; Transliteration: "Tate, Burubasutā! Namidome vs Shiota Zenmen Sensō! Katsu no wa Dai Kigyō no Ronri ka, Chūshō Kigyō no Sokojikara ka!?" (Japanese: 立て、ブルバスター！波止 vs 塩田 全面戦争！勝つのは大企業の論理か、中小企業の底力か！？)	Satoshi Matsubara	Hiroyasu Aoki	Hiroyasu Aoki; Yoshihiro Kanno	December 20, 2023
Namidome and the islanders join forces to eliminate the Giant Beast threat before Shiota Chemical can legally take possession of the island. They are able to successfully collect electrogenic bacteria samples and destroy the bacteria in the lake with an electric shock. However, before they can seal the underwater tunnel and erect a fence around the lake, a massive Giant Beast appears which Okino and Arumi are barely able to defeat. With the Giant Beasts eliminated, the islanders complete their work just before Shiota Chemical takes custody of the island. However, Tajima is able to smuggle the bacteria samples out of the island and turn them over to the authorities. Shiota Chemical is put under investigation and Shikuachi is arrested as the patsy while the islanders are allowed to return to their homes and rebuild and Toramasa manufactures his baldness cure. At the airport, Tajima intercepts Washizu, who plans to flee the country with a stolen bacteria sample. Tajima swears to Washizu that if he ever tries to create more Giant Beasts, Namidome will be there to stop him with Bullbuster.

== Reception ==
The Encyclopedia of Science Fiction identified criticism of large corporations as the principal theme of Bullbuster, with its mecha-versus-monster action playing a secondary role. It interpreted Shiota Chemical as a satirical portrayal of corporate power: initially bureaucratic but apparently benign, the company proves unscrupulous when its financial interests are threatened or opportunities for profit arise. The encyclopedia contrasted this model with the cooperative relationships maintained by Namidome Industries and other businesses, highlighting the series' presentation of equal and mutually beneficial partnerships as an alternative approach to commerce.
