= Variety Big Brother =

Taiwanese variety show

- Also known as: 綜藝大哥大 综艺大哥大 zōngyì dàgēdà
- Genre: entertainment
- Presented by: Chang Fei
- Country of origin: Taiwan
- Original language: Mandarin
- No. of episodes: 485

Original release
- Network: China Television
- Release: April 20, 2002 – September 24, 2011

Variety Big Brother (traditional Chinese: 綜藝大哥大; simplified Chinese: 综艺大哥大; pinyin: zōngyì dàgēdà, literally Big Brother of Entertainment), also known as Big Brother's Return, is a television show hosted by Chang Fei, a.k.a. Fei Ge, which screened on Taiwanese channel China Television on Saturday evenings, Singapore Mediacorp Channel U on Sunday nights and Singapore Mediacorp Channel 8 on Friday nights. In 2007 the show was nominated for Best Entertainment Variety Programme at the 42nd Golden Bell Awards.

Host Chang Fei is reportedly retiring as a host but would still be involved with the show. One of the co-hosts, Kang Kang, left the show in 2004. The current co-hosts are Huang Pin-yuan and Honduras. The show ended its run on September 24, 2011.

== Format ==
The program representative of the format and style common to Taiwanese comedy-variety shows, with amateur performances and a number of Taiwanese celebrities. Every week the show has celebrity guests and performers from Taiwan and/or abroad. It is split into two separate types of performances. The first segment uses singing performances and the second segment uses magic performances including a magic competition judged by famous magicians. Earlier episodes typically have comedy sketches with the main cast. The series has slowly progressed into a celebrity-studded show.

Like most Taiwanese variety shows, there are frequent on-screen displays (if freudian slips or puns occurred), stock sound effects and a laugh track (despite being taped in front of a fairly small audience).

Chang's brother, Fei Yu Ching, a well-known classical singer, is a frequent guest and a co-host. Co-host Ni Min Jan failed to appear in several shows, and it was later revealed he had committed suicide after he was suspected of having an affair.

== International broadcast ==
It is shown in the United States on the San Francisco Bay Area-based television station KTSF, which shows much Chinese-language programming for the area, under the English translation Big Brother of Entertainment, the literal translation of the Chinese title.
