= Eisaku Kubonouchi =

Japanese manga artist

Eisaku Kubonouchi 窪之内英策
- Born: November 11, 1966 (age 60) Kōchi, Japan
- Area: Manga artist
- Notable works: Chocolat
- Collaborators: Cup Noodles

Eisaku Kubonouchi (窪之内英策, Kubonouchi Eisaku; born November 11, 1966 in Kōchi, Japan) is a Japanese manga artist and character designer.

== Biography ==
Kubonouchi made his professional career debut in 1986 with the short story Okappiki Eiji published in the manga magazine Shōnen Sunday. From 1988 to 1991, he worked on his first series, Tsurumoku Dokushin Ryō, which was in 1991 made into a movie with Kōyō Maeda (ja) in the leading role. His second manga series, Watanabe, was made into a television series in 1993, directed by Kiyoshi Kurosawa. After a 7-year hiatus, Kubonouchi began Chocolat, a story about a former mob boss, just having been released from the prison, who befriends a 16-year-old girl. Chocolat was published from October 1999 to September 2003 in Big Comic Spirits. In 2003, the manga was made into a television drama, that lasted 45 episodes.

== Works ==
Title	Year	Notes	Refs
Tsurumoku Dokushin Ryō (ツルモク独身寮, Tsurumoku Bachelor Dormitory)	1988–91	Serialized in Big Comic Spirits, 7 volumes	
Watanabe (ワタナベ)	1992	Serialized in Big Comic Spirits, 3 volumes	
Chocolat	1999–2003	Serialized in Big Comic Spirits; Published by Shogakukan, 7 volumes	
Cherī (チェリー, Cherry)	2006–07	Published in Big Comic Spirits, 4 volumes	
Pikamon (ピカもん)	2008–10	Published in Evening Kodansha Comics, 3 volumes	
Sono Toki, Kanojo wa	2018	Original creator, Character Design	
Bullbuster	2018	Original Character Design	
Carole & Tuesday	2019	Original Character Design	
Astro Note	2024	Original Character Design	

=== Other works ===
Other works	Title	Refs
Character redesign for Cup Noodle Ads	Sazae-san	
Character redesign for Cup Noodle Ads	Heidi, Girl of the Alps	
Character redesign for Cup Noodle Ads	Kiki's Delivery Service	
Character redesign for Cup Noodle Ads	One Piece	
