= Night Market Hero =

- Film poster
- Chinese: 雞排英雄
- Directed by: Yeh Tien-lun
- Written by: Yeh Tien-lun
- Produced by: Yeh Tan-ching
- Starring: Lan Cheng-lung; Ko Chia-yen
- Cinematography: Chin Ting-chang
- Edited by: Hsiao Ju-kuan
- Music by: Lu Sheng-fei
- Production company: Green Film Production
- Distributed by: 20th Century Fox
- Release date: January 28, 2011
- Running time: 124 minutes
- Country: Taiwan
- Language: Taiwanese Hokkien

Night Market Hero (Chinese: 雞排英雄) is a 2011 Taiwanese film. The plot focuses on the life of food vendors in Taiwan's night markets. It was performed by Lan Cheng-lung, Ko Chia-yen, and Chu Ke-liang. It won Best Film at the Guam International Film Festival in 2011.

== Plot ==
The 888 Night Market, is a place filled with an atmosphere of warmth and joy every day. A-hua is the night market's managing director and, responsible for mediating night market disputes to protect the interests of the vendors.

One night, Lin Yi-nan, a female reporter, was riding her motorcycle and collided with Hsiao-chi near the night market. When A-hua met Lin Yi-nan, his heart unconsciously opened. However, since their meeting, Lin Yi-nan's life fell into chaos – at work, she was severely criticized by her supervisor; her boyfriend broke up with her; and she was sentenced to community service at 888 Night Market as a punishment for destroying an electric circuit. The friendliness of A-hua and the vendors gradually dispelled the loneliness that Lin Yi-nan felt in a foreign place, and their relationship was no longer tense.

Later, a construction company purchased the land where 888 Night Market was located, bribed legislator Chang Chin-liang, and threatened to close the market. The vendors’ livelihoods were at risk. What was worse, the construction company also employed gangsters to damage the night market.

To protect the night market, A-hua led the vendors to protest and work with media to reveal the stories of their hardships and dreams. In the end, the night market was preserved.

== Casting ==
- Lan Cheng-lung as Chen Yi-hua, nicknamed, A-hua, managing director of 888 Night Market
  - Barry Liang as young A-hua
- Ko Chia-yen as Lin Yi-nan, a reporter
  - Chu Ching-yu as young Lin Yi-nan
- David Chao as Wang Kuo-ping, nicknamed Siba Wang (Eighteen King), sausage vendor
- Lotus Wang as King Ai-chu, nicknamed A-chu
- Yen Yi-wen as Chiu Man-mei, elder sister of Hsiao-chi
- Emerson Tsai as Hsiao-chi (Little Seven)
- Esther Liu as Lin Mei-hsiang, vendor of cosmeceuticals
- Wu Tsui-o as Chen Wang-ju, A-hua's grandmother
- Lu Hsueh-feng as Auntie, provides threading services, mother of Lin Yi-nan
- Fan Kuang-yao as Luo Shang-te, legislative assistant to Chang Chin-liang
- Ying Wei-min as Hong Kuei (Red Turtle), a gangster
- Wang Ching-kuan and Bamboo Chen as construction workers
- Hao Shao-ting as Fatty, the son of A-chu
- Wu Kuo-chou as A-chu's assistant
- Chu Ke-liang as Chang Chin-liang, a legislator
- Cheng Chih-hung as a legislator

== Reception ==
Night Market Hero is the feature directorial debut film of Yeh Tien-lun. The film drew attention for its use of Taiwanese Hokkien, and was compared to Cinema Paradiso and the work of François Truffaut. The release of the Taiwanese film Night Market Hero in mainland China marked a watershed moment in Taiwan's film industry. Night Market Hero is the first Taiwanese film to be shown in mainland China since the Economic Cooperation Framework Agreement was signed on June 29, 2010. It grossed NT$140 million (US$4.9 million) at Taiwan box offices in 2011.
