= Hualien Media International =

- Industry: Media, Entertainment
- Founder: George Hsieh
- Headquarters: Taipei, Taiwan
- Area served: Worldwide
- Products: movies
- Services: production, distribution, agency
- Website: Official website

Hualien Media International Co., Ltd. (Chinese: 華聯國際多媒體股份有限公司) is a global entertainment company based in Taipei, Taiwan. Co-invested by Taroko textile Corporation, Showtime Cinema, and Ambassador Theatres. Operations which encompass motion pictures/television/new media productions, acquisitions and distributions. artists representation and theme parks development.

== History ==
In year 2015 Hualien Media International produced and Invested in Our Times. It recorded high and is the best seller Taiwan movie globally ever. Furthermore, global box office of Our Times is 2.4billion NTD. There are two movies which hit the 10 million NTD box office: Our Times, The Wonderful Wedding both distributed by Hualien Media International Co., Ltd. Previous to the 2015 Comikaze Expo, Hualien Media International and Stan Lee announced the launch of a whole new sci-fi action franchise "Arch Alien". It is created by the screenplay writer of HBO's famous TV series "Rome", William J. MacDonald and the director of CW's The Flash, Ralph Hemecker to make this action-thriller movie.

== Productions ==
- Our Times (Romance, 2015)
- Dream Ocean (Documentary, 2015)
- Arch Alien (Action, Adventure, Fantasy, 2016) POW!, Mission Control Entertainment

== Distributions ==
- Words and Pictures (comedy, drama, romance, 2014)
- Before I Go to Sleep (drama, mystery, thriller, 2014)
- Sex Appeal (drama, romance, 2014)
- Kill the Messenger (biography, crime, drama, 2014)
- Fury (action, drama, war, 2014)
- Dumb and Dumber To (comedy, 2014)
- Women Who Flirt (comedy, 2015)
- The Wonderful Wedding (comedy, 2015)
- It Follows (horror, mystery, thriller, 2015)
- Sashimi (comedy, romance, 2015)
- Baby Steps (comedy, drama, family, 2015)
- The Missing Piece (comedy, adventure, 2015)
- Tusk (comedy, drama, horror, 2015)
- Our Times (romance, 2015)
- All You Need Is Love (romance, 2015)
- Selma(Biography, Drama, History, 2015)
- Dream Ocean (documentary, 2015)
- A Most Violent Year (action, crime, drama, 2015)
- No Escape (action, thriller, 2015)
- One journey, one mission (documentary, 2015)
- Irrational Man (drama, mystery, 2015)
- The 33 (biography, drama, history, 2015)
- A Fool (comedy, drama, 2015)
- A Tale of Three Cities (Drama, 2016)
- Rookie Chef (comedy, 2016)
- Welcome to the Happy Days (comedy, 2016)
- At Cafe 6 (romance, 2016)
