= Ni Min-jan =

Taiwanese actor and comedian

- Chinese: 倪敏然; pinyin: Ní Mǐnrán
- Born: 30 April 1946
- Disappeared: April 2005; Taiwan
- Status: Found dead (by hanging)
- Died: April 2005 (age 58–59); Toucheng (頭城) in Yilan County, Taiwan
- Cause of death: Suicide
- Occupations: Actor and comedian

Ni Min-jan (Chinese: 倪敏然; pinyin: Ní Mǐnrán; Pe̍h-ōe-jī: Gê Bín-jiân; 30 April 1946 – April 2005) was a famous well-rounded Taiwanese celebrity and entertainer, TV and movie star, comedian and recording artist, cross-talk (Xiangsheng) and play writer.

In 1979, he teamed up with Zhang Kui, Zhang Fei, Ling Feng, and Xia Yunfei to form the "Wenna Five Rats" (named after the Wenna Five Tigers). The group was a sensation in the Taiwan show scene in the 1980s. Ni Min-jan was brilliant at imitating funny, well-known classic characters such as "Mr. Seven" and "Vice President Ni".

The cause of his death was suicide by hanging in April 2005 at age 58 or 59. Ni had been suffering from depression, and was having financial and family problems, including having an affair with Xia Yi.

Ni was friends with singer and television personality Chang Fei and singer Frankie Kao.

== See also ==
- List of comedians
- List of Taiwanese people
- Lists of actors
