= Jocelyn Wang =

Taiwanese actress (born 1980)

- 王怡仁
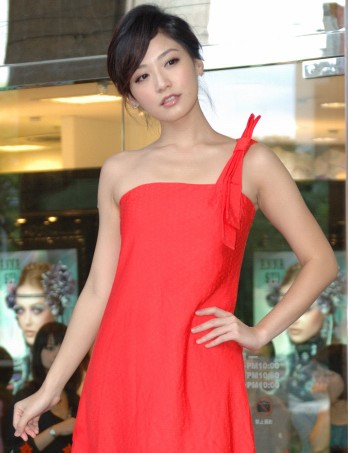
- Wang in 2010
- Born: 13 June 1980 (age 46); Taiwan
- Education: Bachelor's degree
- Alma mater: Tamkang University
- Occupations: Actress; news presenter; TV hostess

Jocelyn Wang (Chinese: 王怡仁; pinyin: Wang Yiren; Wade-Giles: Wang I-jen; born 13 June 1980) is a Taiwanese actress, former news anchorwoman and TV hostess. She is best known for her role as the lead anchor for TVBS-NEWS in the evening. Since November 2005, she has phased out her involvement in the mass media to focus on a career in show business.

== Personal life ==
Wang graduated from Tamkang University in Taipei with a bachelor's degree in Economics. She has also attended an ESL program at New York University's American Language Institute.

== Television ==
| Year | Title | Chinese title | Role | Network |
|---|---|---|---|---|
| 2008 | Love Catcher | 幸福捕手 | Yu Die 羽蝶 | TTV |
| 2009 | Easy Fortune Easy Life | 福氣又安康 | Jiang Zhen Zhen 江珍珍 | TTV |
| 2010 | Jia You Si Qian Jin | 家有四千金 | Wu Qiu Tian 吳秋天 | TTV |
| 2011 | Girl in the Male Dormitory | 男女生了沒 | Mi Ya 米亞 | |
