= Chang Fei =

Taiwanese television host (born 1952)

- 張菲
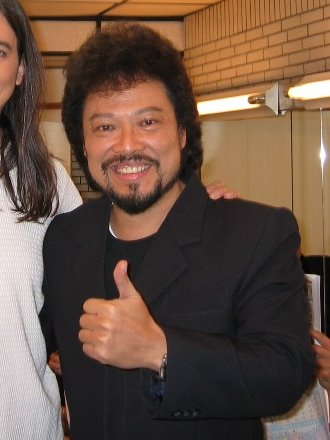
- Chang in 2003
- Born: Chang Yan-ming; 4 December 1952 (age 73); Taipei, Taiwan
- Education: Taoyuan Municipal Longtan Senior High School
- Occupations: Singer; host
- Years active: 1977–2000; 2002–2012; 2018–present
- Spouse: Zhao Cui-hua (m. 1975; div. 1990)
- Children: 2
- Family: Fei Yu-ching (brother)
- Musical career
- Also known as: Brother Fei (菲哥)
- Genres: Folk, Mandopop

Chinese name
- Traditional Chinese: 張菲
- Simplified Chinese: 张菲
Transcriptions
Standard Mandarin
- Hanyu Pinyin: Zhāng Fēi
Southern Min
- Hokkien POJ: Tiuⁿ Húi

Chang Yan-ming (birth name)
- Traditional Chinese: 張彥明
- Simplified Chinese: 张彦明
Transcriptions
Standard Mandarin
- Hanyu Pinyin: Zhāng Yànmíng
Southern Min
- Hokkien POJ: Tiuⁿ Gān-bêng

Chang Fei (Chinese: 張菲; pinyin: Zhāng Fēi; Pe̍h-ōe-jī: Tiuⁿ Húi; born Chang Yan-ming (simplified Chinese: 张彦明; traditional Chinese: 張彥明; pinyin: Zhāng Yànmíng; Pe̍h-ōe-jī: Tiuⁿ Gān-bêng; born 4 December 1952) is a Taiwanese singer and television personality.

He retired from show business following the cancellation of Variety Big Brother (綜藝大哥大) in 2018.

== Early life ==
He was born Chang Yan-ming in Taipei, Taiwan, on 4 December 1952, His eldest sister Chang Yan-qiong was a singer formerly known as Jenny Fei, who later became a buddhist nun known by the dharma name of Shi Heng Shu (Chinese: 釋恆述; Pe̍h-ōe-jī: Sek Hêng-su̍t), better known as Heng Shu (Chinese: 釋恆法師; Pe̍h-ōe-jī: Sek-hêng Hoat-su). He is the elder brother of ballad singer Fei Yu-ching.

Chang married a South Korean woman Zhao Cui-hua in 1975 and they had two sons, Chang Shao-ching and Chang Shao-huai. Chang and Zhao divorced in 1990.

== Career ==
Chang Fei is the host of the variety show Variety Big Brother (Chinese: 綜藝大哥大; Pe̍h-ōe-jī: Chong-gē Tāi-ko-tāi), and is also a singer who has recorded CDs. He is associated with long-time friends including Frankie Kao and the late comedian Ni Min-jan and owns several successful restaurants. He is also one of the most celebrated wing surfers in the local surfing community. Known for his taste of the classical music and jazz, he has performed as a saxophone player. Many celebrities will remember his famous quote from the early TV show, "Comedian Bump Earth" (Chinese: 笑星撞地球; Pe̍h-ōe-jī: Chhiò-seng Tōng Tōe-kiû), saying Are you Happy? Yes We Are! (Chinese: 幸福嗎?很美满!; Pe̍h-ōe-jī: Khoài-lo̍k má? Hún Khoài-lo̍k!). Fei is reportedly to be on his way to retirement, beating out his disciples such as Jacky Wu (Chinese: 吳宗憲; Pe̍h-ōe-jī: Ngô͘ Chong-hiàn) and Hu Gua (Chinese: 胡瓜; Pe̍h-ōe-jī: Ô͘ Koa). He planned for Kang Kang to be his successor. However, Kang Kang left Variety Big Brother before its final show.

Although Fei was rumored to be retiring, he is still active in making appearances on various Taiwanese variety shows.
