= Golden Bell Award for Best Supporting Actress in a Miniseries or Television Film =

- Location: Taiwan
- Presented by: Golden Bell Awards
- Currently held by: Fan Jui-chun for Bonus Trip (2023)

This is a list of winners and nominees of the Golden Bell Award for Best Supporting Actress in a Miniseries or Television Film (Chinese: 電視金鐘獎迷你劇集(電視電影)女配角獎).

== Winners and nominees ==
=== 2010s ===
Year	Actress	English title	Original title	Ref
2017; 52nd Golden Bell Awards
2017; 52nd Golden Bell Awards	Chou Heng-yin	In Love - Norwegian Forest	滾石愛情故事－挪威的森林	
2017; 52nd Golden Bell Awards	Lee Chien-na	The Teenage Psychic	通靈少女	
2017; 52nd Golden Bell Awards	Yang Kuei-mei	She's Family	媽媽不見了	
2017; 52nd Golden Bell Awards	Yang Li-yin	Estranged Father	我的陌生爸爸	
2017; 52nd Golden Bell Awards	Cheng Chia-yu	The Long Goodbye	公視人生劇展－告別	
2018; 53rd Golden Bell Awards
2018; 53rd Golden Bell Awards	Wang Chuan	Ching's Way Homes	阿青,回家了	
2018; 53rd Golden Bell Awards	Iris Hu	Days We Stared at the Sun II	他們在畢業的前一天爆炸2	
2018; 53rd Golden Bell Awards	Ruby Zhan	Ghost High School	恐怖高校劇場之直播中二間	
2018; 53rd Golden Bell Awards	Liao Yi-ling	Far and Away: Third Force	外鄉女-第三力量	
2018; 53rd Golden Bell Awards	Iain Lu	Where the Sun Don't Shine	公視人生劇展-青苔	
2019; 54th Golden Bell Awards
2019; 54th Golden Bell Awards	Gingle Wang	On Children: The Last Day of Molly	你的孩子不是你的孩子-茉莉的最後一天	
2019; 54th Golden Bell Awards	Diane Lin	Hijra In Between	海吉拉	
2019; 54th Golden Bell Awards	Lien Yu-Han	The Coming Through	奇蹟的女兒	
2019; 54th Golden Bell Awards	Lu Yi-ching	PTS Life Story: 3 Days 2 Nights	公視人生劇展－3天2夜	
2019; 54th Golden Bell Awards	Eugene Hsieh	PTS Life Story: Lady CaCa	公視人生劇展－淚滴卡卡	

=== 2020s ===
Year	Actress	English title	Original title	Ref
2020; 55th Golden Bell Awards
2020; 55th Golden Bell Awards	Ding Ning	PTS Life Story: Viatical Settlement	公視人生劇展－殘值	
2020; 55th Golden Bell Awards	Mavis Fan	Nowhere Man	罪夢者	
2020; 55th Golden Bell Awards	Yang Li-yin	The Making of An Ordinary Woman	俗女養成記	
2020; 55th Golden Bell Awards	Nikki Hsieh	Til Death Do Us Part: No Pets Allowed	住戶公約第一條	
2020; 55th Golden Bell Awards	Sara Yu	The Making of An Ordinary Woman	俗女養成記	
2021; 56th Golden Bell Awards
2021; 56th Golden Bell Awards	Esther Huang	Who Killed the Good Man	大债时代	
2022; 57th Golden Bell Awards
2022; 57th Golden Bell Awards	Lyan Cheng	Fragrance of the First Flower	第一次遇見花香的那刻	
2023; 58th Golden Bell Awards
2023; 58th Golden Bell Awards	Ding Ning	Shards of Her	她和她的她	
2023; 58th Golden Bell Awards	Fan Jui-chun	Bonus Trip	額外旅程	
2023; 58th Golden Bell Awards	Chen Yu	Space Boy	台語有影 - 阿波羅男孩	
2023; 58th Golden Bell Awards	Tsai Hsuan-yen	Wave Makers	人選之人—造浪者	
2023; 58th Golden Bell Awards	Lai Pei-hsia	Wave Makers	人選之人—造浪者	
