= Liu Hsiu-fu =

Taiwanese actor (born 1997)

- 劉修甫
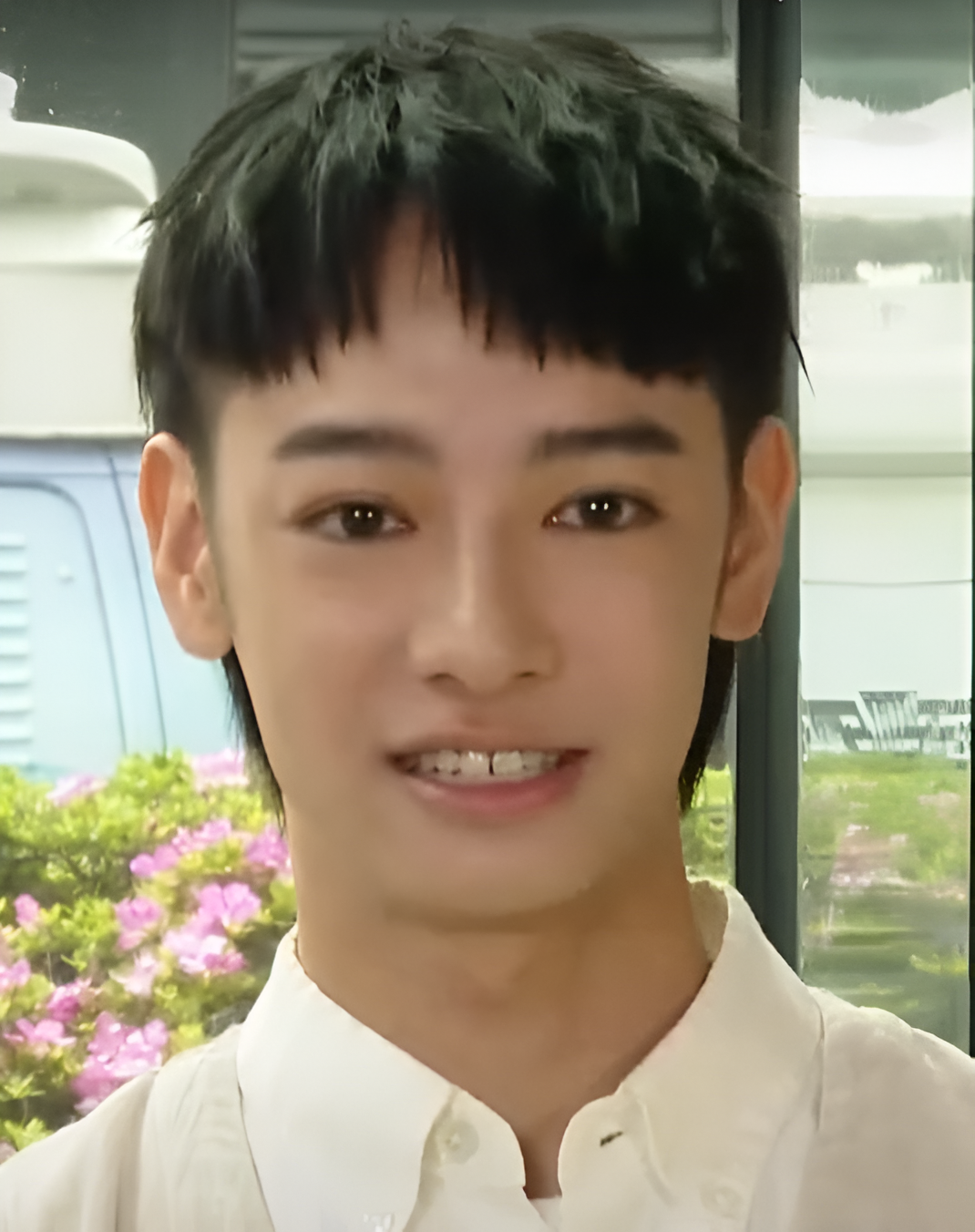
- Liu in May 2023
- Born: 1997 (age 28–29); Taiwan
- Other name: 刘修甫我老公
- Education: National Taichung University of Science and Technology (BDes)
- Occupation: Actor
- Years active: 2018–present

Liu Hsiu-fu (Chinese: 劉修甫; born 1997) is a Taiwanese actor best known for his debut role as Chung Kuo-yen in the PTS series On Children (2018), which earned him a nomination for Best Newcomer in a Miniseries in the 54th Golden Bell Awards.

== Early life and education ==
Liu was born in 1997. He has an elder sister who studied abroad in Hong Kong. His parents divorced when he was in kindergarten, and the siblings were raised by their father. Liu described his relationship with his father as close and his childhood as one spent in a "strict household", which contributed to him achieving good academic results. He attended a private school starting in junior high, and was a member of the rock club in high school. He later enrolled at National Taichung University of Science and Technology, graduating with a Bachelor of Design, majoring in product design. During his university years, he was invited by a friend to star in a senior's graduation film project, which sparked his interest in acting, and he also worked as a model for magazine covers and advertisements.

== Career ==
When Liu was in his third year of university, he participated in an audition on his sister's recommendation. He was selected by director Chen Wei-ling, who found his "melancholic aura" very suitable for the role after seeing him at casting. Liu made his debut at the age of 19 as Chung Kuo-yen in the segment "Child of the Cat" of the 2018 PTS series On Children, starring alongside Chung Hsin-ling. His performance earned him a nomination for Best Newcomer in a Miniseries or Television Film in the 54th Golden Bell Awards, and prompted him to move to Taipei to work full-time as an actor after receiving the nomination. Following his debut, Liu starred as Ying Si-de, the stepbrother of the characters played by Pets Tseng and JC Lin, in the 2019 drama series The World Between Us, and took on a main role as Bryan Chang's deceased brother in the 2020 series The Haunted Heart.

In 2021, he appeared in a supporting role in the sci-fi thriller Plurality, and was named Top Talent by the Taipei Film Festival. Liu played another significant role as Guan Heng-da, the younger brother of the male lead played by Marcus Chang, in the 2023 romance series Trick or Love. In 2024, he appeared as the son of characters played by Christopher Lee and Tien Hsin who suffers from ALS, in the sci-fi series Q18 Quantum Dice. That same year, Liu landed his first lead role in the feature film Pierce, a Singapore-Taiwan-Poland project, where he played Zijie, a fencer and the younger brother of a former fencing champion portrayed by Tsao Yu-ning. John Lui of The Straits Times praised Liu's "breakthrough performance", which captures "both the physical demands of competitive fencing and the psychological complexity of a young man"; while John Berra of Screen Daily described Liu's portrayal as "wholly empathetic", naturally reflecting the character's youthful and skeptic nature.

== Filmography ==
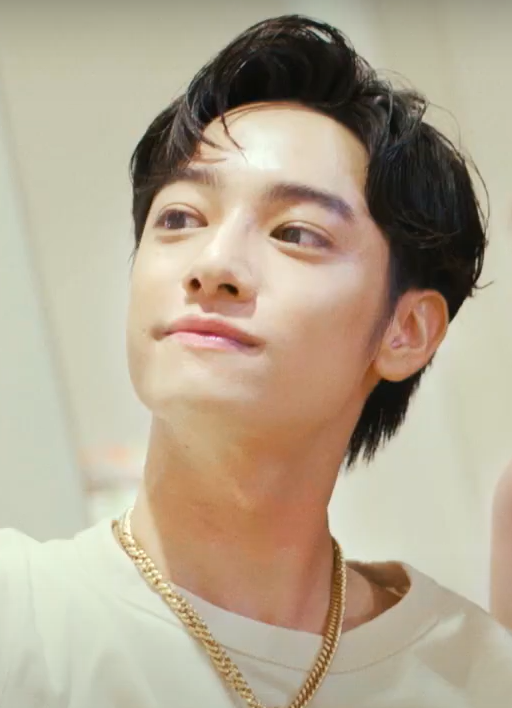
Liu modelling for Chanel in August 2020

=== Film ===
Year	Title	Role	Notes/Ref.
2021	Plurality	Lin Zi-ping (林子平)	
2024	Pierce	Zijie (子滐)	

=== Television ===
Year	Title	Role	Notes/Ref.
2018	On Children	Chung Kuo-yen (鍾國衍)	Main role; segment: "Child of the Cat"
2019	The World Between Us	Ying Si-de (應思德)	Recurring role
2020	The Haunted Heart	Shi Da-heng (時大恆)	Main role
2023	Trick or Love	Guan Heng-da (關恆達)	Main role
2024	Q18 Quantum Dice	Hsiao Kuang (小匡)	Main role
TBA	Bloody Smart	TBA	Main role

== Awards and nominations ==
Year	Award	Category	Work	Result	Ref.
2019	54th Golden Bell Awards	Best Newcomer in a Miniseries or Television Film	On Children	Nominated	
2024	19th Rome Film Festival	Best First Film Award	Pierce	Special mention	
