= Plurality (film) =

2021 Taiwanese film by Aozaru Shiao

- Theatrical release poster
- Traditional Chinese: 複身犯
- Literal meaning: Multiple-bodied Criminal
- Directed by: Aozaru Shiao
- Screenplay by: Aozaru Shiao; Hung Tzu-yung
- Produced by: Lin Bing-yu
- Starring: Tony Yang; Sandrine Pinna; Frederick Lee; Chen Yi-wen; JC Lin; Gingle Wang
- Cinematography: Jim Yu
- Edited by: Kao Ming-sheng; Chen Chun-hung
- Music by: Blaire Ko
- Production company: CalFilms Asia
- Distributed by: Machi Xcelsior Studios
- Release date: 26 February 2021 (Taiwan)
- Running time: 106 minutes
- Country: Taiwan
- Language: Mandarin
- Budget: $70,000,000 NTD

Plurality (Chinese: 複身犯) is a 2021 Taiwanese psychological thriller film directed by Aozaru Shiao and co-written by Shiao and Hung Tzu-yung. Starring Tony Yang, Sandrine Pinna, Frederick Lee, Chen Yi-wen, JC Lin, and Gingle Wang, the film revolves around a death row prisoner (Yang) whose body is implanted with five personas of deceased abduction suspects by a scientist (Pinna) and a detective (Lee), in hopes of rescuing the abducted children.

The film was theatrically released on 26 February 2021 in Taiwan. It received three nominations in the 23rd Taipei Film Awards.

== Plot ==
A man boards a bus heading toward a remote wetland, accompanied by driver Qiu Chun-sheng, spoiled runaway Wang Ting, businessman Liao Tsi-hui, and university student Lin Zi-ping. On the way, the bus crashes and explodes, killing everyone on board.

In an interrogation room, Qiu, Ting, and Liao are questioned. Dr. Shen and Detective Wang, in charge of the case, reveal that they have died and their consciousnesses have been implanted into Subject 193, a body originally belonging to death-row inmate Chen Kuang-hsuan. A serial murderer, known for targeting children with disabilities, was last seen heading towards the wetlands. The police suspect one of the bus passengers is the murderer. Shen and Wang attempt to awaken the remaining personas, but Lin does not respond; Shen presumes Lin dies before his consciousness transmits. The fifth passenger, Hsu Ming-ze, then takes control of the body. He demands to see his daughter and shares vivid memories of the abducted children which belong to one of the other personas. Shen and Wang decide to cooperate with Hsu, who seems cooperative and offers useful leads.

In 193's mind, Liao invites Hsu to join the others and escape. Meanwhile, Wang investigates and discovers that Hsu's daughter died years ago. Seeing this as a bargaining opportunity, Wang decides to conceal the truth and manipulate Hsu for help. Qiu then takes control of 193's body, evades surveillance, and triggers an emergency alarm. Shen rushes to check on him, only to be taken hostage. Wang and his men quickly pursue them. During the car chase, Shen realizes different personas are fighting for control of 193's body. The car crashes when Ting, unaware of how to drive, takes over. Initially, Shen flees but hears 193 moaning about saving his daughter. Thinking it is Hsu, she returns to help, only to find out it is Liao's pretense, and is knocked unconscious.

After waking up, Shen finds herself in a junkyard. A group of thugs has tied 193 to a chair and are interrogating him. 193 tells the thugs he is Liao. The thug leader reluctantly believes him and gives him a bag of money. However, 193 then brutally slaughters all the thugs. Shen, horrified, flees but is soon caught by 193. He claims to be Liao, and based on the thugs' conversation, Shen deduces that Liao, Qiu, and Ting have all been involved in the abductions, acting as the money launderer, getaway driver, and abductor. Wang tracks 193 and Shen to the junkyard. Observing 193 use his left hand to kill the thugs on the surveillance footage, while all known personas are right-handed, Wang concludes that the true culprit must be Lin Zi-ping. He calls Shen with his findings while leading his men to Lin's house to rescue the children. Meanwhile, Shen and 193 flee to a motel. Believing Lin is the mastermind, Hsu promises to re-enter 193's mind to find Lin's memories for the location of the abducted children if Shen takes care of his daughter.

At Lin's house, Wang finds photos of Lin alongside a prosthetic arm, realizing Lin has no left arm and thus cannot be the murderer. A returning Hsu in 193's mind witnesses Qiu, Liao, and Ting being slaughtered. Escaping, Hsu bumps into a tied-up Lin. He questions Lin, who insists that Hsu Ming-ze is the murderer and is currently hunting the personas, having invited everyone onto the bus with plans to kill them all. Puzzled, Hsu argues that it's impossible for him to be the murderer. A man then appears and snaps Lin's neck, revealing himself to be Hsu. The Hsu who thought himself to be Hsu is actually Chen Kuang-hsuan, the owner of the body, with fragmented memories due to brain injuries.

Wang brings Chen's daughter to meet 193 to fulfill his promise. However, 193 attempts to assault Chen's daughter under the guise of a hug. Shen realizes it is Hsu, prompting the police to subdue 193. Chen's persona takes control, revealing Hsu is briefly unconscious. Chen hugs his daughter one last time and allows Shen to execute him, fulfilling his death sentence and ensuring the murderer is gone.

== Cast ==
- Tony Yang as Chen Kuang-hsuan / 193, a death row prisoner in a vegetative state whose body is used to implant the personas of five child abduction suspects
- Sandrine Pinna as Dr. Shen, a scientist in charge of the implantation
- Frederick Lee as Detective Wang, a ruthless police investigator
- Chen Yi-wen as Liao Tsi-hui, one of the five passengers on the wrecked bus and a shady businessman
- JC Lin as Qiu Chun-sheng, the driver of the wrecked bus
- Gingle Wang as Wang Ting, one of the five passengers on the wrecked bus and a spoiled dropout

Also appearing in the film are Duncan Chow as Hsu Ming-ze, one of the five passengers on the wrecked bus and the mastermind behind the child abductions; Liu Hsiu-fu as Lin Zi-ping, one of the five passengers on the wrecked bus and a university student; Fu Lei as the chief inspector; and Lung Shao-hua as Big Head, a thug leader connected to Liao.

== Production ==
=== Development ===
In 2016, writer Hung Tzu-yung submitted the screenplay draft Road 193 (to the Moon) to the Taiwan Film and Audiovisual Institute and won first prize at the Excellent Screenplay Award, which attracted producer Lin Bing-yu to purchase the adaptation rights. Lin proposed to Hung that director Aozaru Shiao, who had just risen to prominence with the medical drama series Wake Up (2015), helm the production. Shiao joined the project and co-wrote the screenplay with Hung the following year, rewriting the storyline to revolve around an abduction investigation to legitimize the character motives and develop elements of suspense. Shiao and Hung produced five to six drafts before moving on to two years of pre-production. Under the working title Codename 193, the film was announced in June 2019, with Tony Yang, Sandrine Pinna, and Frederick Lee announced as the lead cast. Yang began a diet to reduce weight prior to the announcement in April to prepare for his character, and he and Lee underwent combat training with action choreographer Scott Hung. The film had a budget of 70 million NTD, which included 10 million from Taiwan's Ministry of Culture and 5 million from the Kaohsiung Film Fund, as well as 4 million and 1.8 million from the Taichung City Government and Tainan City Government, respectively. An official trailer was released on 24 December 2020.

=== Filming ===
Principal photography began in May 2019 in Taichung, with location shooting taking place at Gaomei Wetlands and Taichung Central Park. Filming also occurred in Kaohsiung and Tainan, featuring Kaohsiung Main Public Library, Linyuan Industrial Park, and Kaohsiung Metropolitan Park in Kaohsiung; Taijiang National Park, Qigu Sea View Tower, Sihcao Boulevard, and the Museum of Archaeology, Tainan Branch of National Museum of Prehistory in Tainan, where the museum was primarily used for the prison scenes in the film. Another recurring backdrop, the wrecked bus, was shot on a replica set built in the studio, with moving scenery added during post-production. Filming ultimately wrapped in July 2019.

== Release ==
Plurality had its premiere in Kaohsiung on 23 February 2021, followed by a theatrical release in Taiwan on 26 February.

== Reception ==
=== Box office ===
Plurality grossed more than 10 million NTD at the box office in its opening weekend.

=== Critical response ===
Phuong Le of The Guardian gave the film 2/5 stars, criticizing Plurality for abandoning its initial promise and complexity in favor of a lackluster narrative filled with random twists and poorly executed production design, which ultimately makes it feel one-dimensional despite its intriguing premise. James Marsh of South China Morning Post gave the film 1/5 stars, bashing on its illogical and chaotic narrative, which fails to effectively explain its premise or deliver coherent storytelling, resulting in a nonsensical climax that leaves both the characters and viewers bewildered.

Han Cheung of Taipei Times lamented the film for its flawed script, one-dimensional supporting characters, reliance on clichés, and similarity to M. Night Shyamalan's Split (2016), despite an engaging premise and strong potential from Tony Yang, Chen Yi-wen, and Gingle Wang, suggesting it lacks the depth of more successful thrillers, while still representing a positive step for Taiwanese cinema. Andrew Saroch of Far East Films also described the film as a solid but ultimately flawed sci-fi thriller that, while well-shot and featuring a strong performance from Tony Yang, fails to fully realize its excellent premise and loses momentum toward the end. Huang Shin-hui, writing for EBC News, offered a rather positive review, calling the film a bold and creative exploration of genre filmmaking in Taiwan and praising its intriguing premise and strong performances.

== Awards and nominations ==
Year	Award	Category	Nominee	Result	Ref.
2021	23rd Taipei Film Awards	Best Actor	Tony Yang	Nominated	
2021	23rd Taipei Film Awards	Best Cinematography	Jim Yu	Nominated	
2021	23rd Taipei Film Awards	Best Visual Effects	Hsu Kuo-chou, Dong Ming-xing	Nominated	
2021	58th Golden Horse Awards	Best Visual Effects	Hsu Kuo-chou, Dong Ming-xing	Nominated	
