= The World Between Us (Taiwanese TV series) =

- Also known as: The World Between Us: After the Flames (S2)
- Traditional Chinese: 我們與惡的距離
- Simplified Chinese: 我们与恶的距离
- Hanyu Pinyin: Wǒmén Yǔ È Dĕ Jùlí
- Hokkien POJ: Ngóo-bûn ú ok tik kū-lî
- Genre: Drama
- Written by: Lü Shih-yuan
- Directed by: Lin Chun-yang
- Starring: (Season 1); Alyssa Chia; Wu Kang Ren; James Wen; Tracy Chou; Pets Tseng; Chen Yuu; JC Lin (Season 2); Vic Chou; Hsueh Shih-ling; Yang Kuei-mei; Liu Tzu-chuan; Ryan Pai
- Ending theme: (Season 1) "Don't Let Me Drift Away (別讓我走遠)" by Yoga Lin (Season 2) "Reborn From Ashes (廢墟之燼)" by Valen Hsu
- Country of origin: Taiwan
- Original languages: Mandarin; Taiwanese Hokkien; English
- No. of seasons: 2
- No. of episodes: 20

Production
- Executive producer: Yu Pei-hua
- Production location: Taiwan
- Cinematography: Chen Ko-chin; Kao Tzu-hao; Ku Yao-hua
- Editor: Lee Chun-hong
- Running time: 50 minutes
- Production companies: DaMou Entertainment; Screenworks Asia (Season 2)

Original release
- Network: PTS; Catchplay+ HBO Asia
- Release: 24 March – 21 April 2019
- Network: PTS; Catchplay+ iQIYI; Amazon Prime Video
- Release: 7 June – 5 July 2025

The World Between Us (Chinese: 我們與惡的距離; lit. ''The Distance Between Us and Evil'') is a 2019 Taiwanese television series written by Lu Shih Yuan and directed by Lin Chun Yang. The series follows the aftermath of a mass shooting at a movie theatre and the fates of all involved: the killer, the victims, the victims' families, the media, and the legal defense team. Contemporary Taiwanese social issues are explored, such as the death penalty, mental health stigmas, journalism ethics, and media sensationalism.

The series stars Alyssa Chia, Wu Kang Ren, James Wen, Tracy Chou, Pets Tseng, Chen Yuu and JC Lin. The World Between Us is produced jointly by the Public Television Service, HBO Asia and Catchplay. The series premiered in Taiwan on March 24, 2019 and consists of 10 episodes.

The series has renewed for the second season, with the story happens in-between before and after the original series was held. The second season, globally labeled The World Between Us: After the Flames was premiered on June 6, 2025 on Amazon Prime Video outside Taiwan.

== Synopsis ==
=== Season 1 ===
Wang She (Wu Kang Ren) is a defense attorney whose desire to serve society's marginalized, including defending the shooter, has strained his young growing family. Li Ta-Chih (Chen Yuu) is a young woman working at a TV news station and the sister of theatre shooter, Li Hsiao Ming (Wang Ko Yuan). She has changed her name to escape the stigma of her brother's crime. Ta-Chih's boss, an ambitious woman named Sung Chiao An (Alyssa Chia), lost her son in the theatre shooting. Laden with guilt over her son’s death, Chiao An lashes out at both her employees and her husband, Liu Chao Kuo (James Wen), a newspaper journalist. Wang She enlists Chao Kuo to investigate Hsiao Ming's true motive for the shooting.

== Cast ==
=== Season 1 ===
- Alyssa Chia as Sung Chiao An
- Wu Kang Ren as Wang She
- James Wen as Liu Chao Kuo
- Tracy Chou as Ting Mei Mei
- Pets Tseng as Ying Ssu Yueh
- Chen Yu as Li Ta-Chih (Li Hsiao Wen)
  - Monica Tsai as young Hsiao Wen
- JC Lin as Ying Ssu Tsung
- Shih Ming-shuai as Lin Yi Chun
- Allison Lin as Sung Chiao Ping
- Honduras as Liao Niu Shih
- Hsieh Chiung Hsuan as Mrs. Li
- Chang Chien as Mr. Li
- Amanda Fan as Ah Ling
- Ho Yu Tien as Ah She
- Chien Chi Feng as Side Judge
- Yao Hsiao as Mrs. Ting
- Hsia Teng-hung as Sie
- Hsu Hao Hsiang as Chief of Society Division
- Lin Chen Hsi as Wang Fei (Hsiao Fei)
- Liu Hsiu-fu as Ying Si De
- Crystal Lin as Hsiao Ching
- Lin Hsin Hui as Clerk
- Lin You Lun as Liu Tien Yen
- Lu Shih Yuan as Judge
- Ba Ge as Mr. Ting
- Sheng Chu Ju as Tzeng Ching Chuan
- Tsai Pei Li as Hsiao A
- Tsai Yi Cheng as Interpreter
- Ryan Tu as Presiding Judge
- Wang Ko Yuan as Li Hsiao Ming
  - Tsai Jui Tse as young Hsiao Ming
- Rose Yu as Liu Tien Ching

=== Season 2 ===
- Vic Chou as Ma Yi-sen
- Hsueh Shih-ling as Kao Cheng-kuang
- Yang Kuei-mei as Kao-Chang Yu-min
- Hsieh Hsin-ying as Kao Cheng-ming / Chen Yu-ming
- Yu Tzu-yu as Hsu Hsing-chu
- Troy Liu as Hu Guan-jun
- Bai Run-yin as Luo Yu
- Brando Huang as Luo Tzu-chiang
- Cheng Yu-fei as Luo Huei
- Chang Han as Hsu Hsing-kuo
- Chan Tzu-hsuan as Chian Chi-huei
- Derek Chang Wang Yi-li
- Chu Chung-heng as Yu Wen-cheng
- Tsai Chen-nan as Chian Kuang-kuen
- Justin Chien as Hu Chia-wei
- Vivi Lee as Wang Li-yun
- Yang Ching as Wang Ching-ching
- Joseph Ma as Chian Chia-hsin
- Chu Chi-ying as Chian Chia-ling
- Lu Yi-ching as Luo Mei-chi
- Huang Di-yang as Liu Shao-ieh
- Chen Hsi-sheng as Wei Chu-mu
- Summer Meng as Niu Yu-ho

== Episodes ==
=== Season 1 ===
No.	Title	Original release date
1	"Victim"	March 24, 2019
2	"Mother's Day"	March 24, 2019
3	"Crack"	March 31, 2019
4	"Insight"	March 31, 2019
5	"Sinner"	April 7, 2019
6	"After the Gunshot"	April 7, 2019
7	"Bullying"	April 14, 2019
8	"All Sentient Beings are Afflicted with Illness"	April 14, 2019
9	"Before Dawn"	April 21, 2019
10	"What the Future Looks Like"	April 21, 2019

=== After the Flames (Season 2) ===
No.	Title	Original release date
1	"Yi-sen: Revenge"	June 7, 2025
2	"Luo Yu: Future"	June 7, 2025
3	"Yu-min: Wife"	June 14, 2025
4	"Hsing-kuo: Chauvinist"	June 14, 2025
5	"Yu-ming: Disgusted"	June 21, 2025
6	"Chia-wei: Standard"	June 21, 2025
7	"Hsing-chu: Grassroots"	June 28, 2025
8	"Cheng-kuang: Initial Aspiration"	June 28, 2025
9	"Chi-huei: Change"	July 5, 2025
10	"Utopia"	July 5, 2025

== Production ==
=== Season 1 ===
Season 1 promotional poster

Lu Shih Yuan (Dear Ex and Long Day's Journey into Night) was hired as its screenwriter. In interviews with Taiwanese media, Lu described how she and the other creators of the series analyzed mountains of data from sources such as PTT, Taiwan's equivalent to Reddit, to understand themes of interest. After observing the public's reaction to the 2016 "Little Light Bulb Incident" in Taiwan (小燈泡事件), in which a young girl nicknamed "Little Light Bulb" was beheaded publicly on the street by a troubled individual suffering from schizophrenia, she narrowed down the premise and spoke with numerous human rights lawyers, judges, and psychiatrists to form the plot. She lamented that Taiwan lagged behind other democracies like Japan and Norway in producing socially realistic dramas and wanted to help Taiwan in this regard.

== Themes ==
=== Mental health and the justice system ===
Attorney Wang She repeatedly discusses how Taiwan’s legal system should have more empathy for the mentally ill and respect international human rights standards. This example and the topic of journalism ethics are unprecedented themes for mainstream Mandarin-language TV.

=== Journalism ethics ===
Taiwan’s National Communications Commission censures Sung Chiao An's news program, creating a discussion about ethics in journalism and how media outlets must balance increasing viewership with reporting integrity.

=== Human nature ===
The show’s Chinese title 我們與惡的距離, translating to “the distance between ourselves and evil,” captures the main source of angst in the series. Each character struggles with their proximity to "evil", either as victims, enablers, or individuals who, had they made slightly different choices, might have ended up as perpetrators themselves. The show reminds viewers that “evil” and “good” are shades of gray rather than black and white. This level of nuanced moral exploration is another novelty for Taiwanese dramas and Mandarin-language television at large.

== Reception ==
On Chinese review website Douban, the series obtained a score of 9.5 out of 10. In April 2019 television series entered the top 50 popular topics of the multilingual Wikipedia.

== Awards and nominations ==
Year	Ceremony	Category	Nominee	Result
2019	14th Seoul International Drama Awards	Best Mini-series	The World Between Us	Nominated
2019	54th Golden Bell Awards	Best Television Series	The World Between Us	Won
2019	54th Golden Bell Awards	Best Leading Actor in a Television Series	Wu Kang-ren	Nominated
2019	54th Golden Bell Awards	Best Leading Actress in a Television Series	Alyssa Chia	Won
2019	54th Golden Bell Awards	Best Supporting Actor in a Television Series	JC Lin	Nominated
2019	54th Golden Bell Awards	Best Supporting Actor in a Television Series	Honduras	Nominated
2019	54th Golden Bell Awards	Best Supporting Actor in a Television Series	James Wen	Won
2019	54th Golden Bell Awards	Best Supporting Actress in a Television Series	Pets Tseng	Won
2019	54th Golden Bell Awards	Best Director in a Television Series	Lin Chun-yang	Won
2019	54th Golden Bell Awards	Best Writing for a Television Series	Lu Shih-Yuan	Won
2019	54th Golden Bell Awards	Best Cinematography	Kao Tzu-hao, Chen Ko-chin, Ku Yao-hua	Nominated
2019	54th Golden Bell Awards	Best Film Editing	Lee Chun-hong	Nominated
2019	54th Golden Bell Awards	Best Lighting Award	Ye Ming-guang	Nominated
2019	54th Golden Bell Awards	Best Art and Design Award	Luo Wen-jing, Pan Yin-yu	Nominated
2019	54th Golden Bell Awards	Best Innovation Program	The World Between Us	Nominated
2019	Busan International Film Festival	Asia Contents Awards of the Asian Film Market - Best Writer	Lu Shih-Yuan	Won
2019	2019 Asian Academy Creative Awards			
2019	2019 Asian Academy Creative Awards	Best Drama Series	The World Between Us	Nominated
2019	2019 Asian Academy Creative Awards	Best Actor in a Leading Role	Wu Kang-ren	Nominated
2019	2019 Asian Academy Creative Awards	Best Actress in a Leading Role	Alyssa Chia	Nominated
2019	2019 Asian Academy Creative Awards	Best Direction (Fiction)	Lin Chun-yang	Nominated
2019	2019 Asian Academy Creative Awards	Best Editing	Lee Chun-hong	Won
2019	2019 Asian Academy Creative Awards	Best Original Screenplay	Lu Shih-Yuan	Won
2019	The 6th Douban Film Annual Awards	Best Chinese Drama, TV	The World Between Us	Won
