= Gingle Wang =

Taiwanese actress

- 王淨
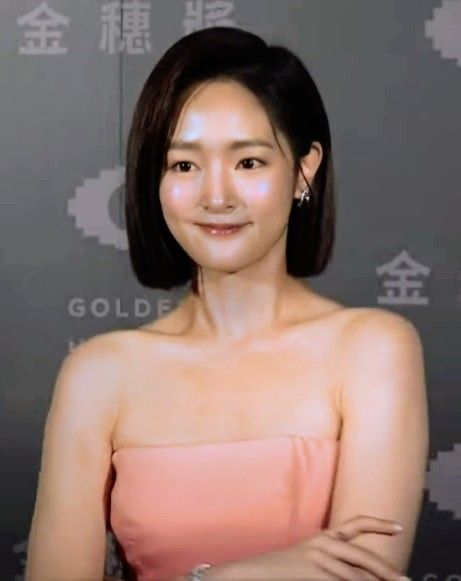
- Wang at the 2022 Golden Harvest Awards
- Born: 7 February 1998 (age 28); Beitou District, Taipei, Taiwan
- Education: Flintridge Sacred Heart Academy; Temple University, Japan Campus
- Occupations: Actress; writer
- Years active: 2013–present

Chinese name
- Traditional Chinese: 王淨
- Simplified Chinese: 王净
- Hanyu Pinyin: Wáng Jìng
- Hokkien POJ: Ông Chēng
- Tâi-lô: Ông Tsīng

Gingle Wang (Chinese: 王淨; pinyin: Wáng Jìng; Pe̍h-ōe-jī: Ông Chēng; born 7 February 1998) is a Taiwanese actress and writer. Gingle began her acting career in 2017 in the film All Because of Love. Her breakthrough came in 2019 with the psychological horror film Detention, where her performance won Best Actress at the 22nd Taipei Film Awards and a nomination for Best Leading Actress at the 56th Golden Horse Awards. She has been described by the Harper's Bazaar Taiwan as a rising star amongst the new generation of Taiwanese actresses.

== Early life and education ==
Gingle Wang was born on February 7, 1998, in Beitou District, Taipei, Taiwan. Raised in a single-mother household, she is close to her mother while having little recollection of her father. In 2009, Wang entered Taipei Municipal Tian-Mu Junior High School but went to Flintridge Sacred Heart Academy in the United States the following year.

In 2013, Wang published her debut novel Bale Love under the pen name Jun Jun at age 15. When she studied alone in the U.S., writing helped her deal with her hardships. Additionally, she hoped her mother could recover from her divorce through her novel, which featured a protagonist who was a divorced woman much like Wang's mother. Two years later she wrote Cockroach Philosophy, her second novel. In 2016, she returned to Taiwan from the United States and was admitted to Temple University, Japan Campus in 2017, where she majored in political science.

== Acting career ==
=== Early career ===
Wang's acting debut was the 2017 romance film All Because of Love. Her casting in this role was partially attributed to the attention she gained after appearing on a YouTube channel featuring recordings of passengers singing KTV in the backseat of a taxi in 2015 at age 17.

In 2018, she was cast as the female lead of the film The Outsiders, based on the 2004 TV series of the same name. She also made an appearance as the lead female in Possession.

Her 2018 portrayal in episodes 5 and 6 of the TV series On Children was nominated for the Best Supporting Actress in a Miniseries or TV Film at the 54th Golden Bell Awards. Wang was deeply invested in her role as Molly Lin and felt that she resonated on a personal level with the character.

=== Breakthrough ===
Wang's breakthrough role in 2019 as the female lead in John Hsu's supernatural psychological horror film Detention set during the White Terror period in Taiwan and based on the video game of the same name. The film was the highest-grossing domestic film in 2019 in Taiwan, and 15th all-time. For her performance, Gingle was nominated for Best Leading Actress at the 56th Golden Horse Awards and won Best Actress at the 22nd Taipei Film Awards.

Wang continued to star in television series in 2019, playing a leading role in Yuan Chengmei in the 15-part series Brave to Love. Later that same year, she appeared as Yin Yue, a supporting actress in the 10-episode series Yong-jiu Grocery Store.

Wang's next film came in 2021, delayed due to production delays caused by the pandemic, appearing in a supporting role as Wang Ting in Plurality, directed by Aozaru Shiao. Later the same year, she appeared alongside Alyssa Chia in female lead roles as the mother-daughter duo in the critically acclaimed The Falls by Chung Mong-Hong. Her performance garnered a nomination for the Best Leading Actress at the 58th Golden Horse Awards.

Wang also starred in Giddens Ko's fantasy romance Till We Meet Again, the second-highest grossing domestic film of 2021 in Taiwan and 14th all-time, where she portrayed a dissatisfied high school girl turned trainee love god, alongside her divine partner Ah Lun, played by Kai Ko.

On October 22, 2021, romance drama More Than Blue: The Series was released worldwide on Netflix. The ten-part series, one year in the making, featured Wang as Cream, an orphaned high school girl, and follows her adventures with K, played by Fandy Fan. Wang made a guest appearance in parts two and three, released in December 2021 and March 2022, respectively, of the three-part television series Light the Night, where she portrayed a younger Rose, the female protagonist of the series, and was widely praised for her role upon the series' release.

Wang had a supporting role in the 2023 supernatural comedy/mystery film Marry My Dead Body as a fellow police officer of the male lead. She also had a lead role in the political drama TV series Wave Makers.

== Personal life ==
Wang has four tattoos: her sister's name "Maple", the Latin aphorism "carpe diem", the Bible verse "Psalm 90:9", and her mother's English name by a rose, her mother's favorite flower. She is fond of reading, writing novels, and watching history and culture series. Her favorite female writers are Echo Chan (三毛) and Xi Murong (席慕蓉). In addition, she also loves photography, exploring nature, and travel.

== Filmography ==
=== Film ===
Year	English title	Original title	Role	Notes/Ref.
2017	All Because of Love	痴情男子漢	Hung Man-li	
2018	The Outsiders	鬥魚	Pei Yuyan	
2018	Possession	靈佔	Wang Chiaying	TV film
2019	Detention	返校	Fang Ruixin	
2019	On Children - The Last Day of Molly	你的孩子不是你的孩子	Molly Lin	TV film
2021	Plurality	複身犯	Wang Ting	
2021	The Falls	瀑布	Wang Jing	
2021	Till We Meet Again	月老	Huang Wenzi/ Pinky	
2023	Marry My Dead Body	關於我和鬼變成家人的那件事	Lin Zi-qing	
2023	The Pig, The Snake and The Pigeon	周處除三害	Cheng Hsiao-Mei	
2024	Dead Talents Society	鬼才之道	The Rookie / Cho Hsiao-lei	

=== Television series ===
Year	English title	Original title	Role	Director	Notes/Ref.
2019	Brave to Love	愛情白皮書	Yuan Chengmei	Lee Yun-Chan and Lin Chun-Yang	
2019	Yong-jiu Grocery Store	用九柑仔店	Yin Yue	Kao Pin-Chuan and Tseng Ying-Ting	
2021	More Than Blue: The Series	比悲傷更悲傷的故事 (影集版)	Sung Yuan-Yuan (Cream)	Hsieh Pei-Ju	Netflix series
2021	Light the Night	華燈初上	Young Lo Yu-nung	Lien Yi-Chi	
2023	Wave Makers	人選之人—造浪者	Chang Ya-ching	Lin Chun-yang	Netflix series
2023	At the Moment	此時此刻	Hsia Wei-Ting	Lien Yi-Chi	Netflix series
2024	GG Precinct	正港分局	Lin Tzu-ching	Cheng Wei-hao and Yin Chen-hao	Netflix series
2024	Not A Murder Story	茁劇場－非殺人小說	Chiang I-Lu	Ko Chen-Nien	

== Bibliography ==
Year	English title	Original title	Publishing house	Notes
2013	Bale Love	芭樂愛情	City State original	
2015	Cockroach Philosophy	蟑螂哲學	City State original	

== Discography ==
2019: "One Day" from Brave to Love, with Xie Xiang Ya

2023: "Beautiful Night", with Zunya

== Awards and nominations ==
Year	Award	Category	Nominated work	Result	Ref.
2019	54th Golden Bell Awards	Best Supporting Actress in a Miniseries or TV Film	On Children - The Last Day of Molly	Nominated	
2019	56th Golden Horse Awards	Best Leading Actress	Detention	Nominated	
2020	22nd Taipei Film Awards	Best Actress	Detention	Won	
2021	58th Golden Horse Awards	Best Leading Actress	The Falls	Nominated	
2023	58th Golden Bell Awards	Best Leading Actress in a Miniseries or TV Film	Wave Makers	Nominated	
