= 19th Rome Film Festival =

19th edition of Rome Film Festival

Festa del Cinema di Roma
- Official poster
- Opening film: The Great Ambition by Andrea Segre
- Closing film: Modì, Three Days on the Wing of Madness by Johnny Depp
- Location: Auditorium Parco della Musica, Rome
- Founded: 2006
- Awards: Best Film: Bound in Heaven by Huo Xin
- Directors: Francesca Via
- Hosted by: Cinema Per Roma Foundation; Rome City of Film
- Artistic director: Paola Malanga
- No. of films: 100
- Festival date: Opening: October 16, 2024; Closing: October 27, 2024
- Language: International
- Website: www.romacinemafest.it

Rome Film Festival
- 20th 18th

The 19th Rome Film Festival opened on 16 October in the Auditorium Parco della Musica, Rome with the Italian biographical drama film The Great Ambition by Andrea Segre. Earlier the pre-opening film of the festival, Megalopolis, an American epic science fiction drama directed by Francis Ford Coppola, was screened on 14 October 2024, at the Cinecittà film studios. The event was streamed live to the Auditorium Parco della Musica's Sala Petrassi. Coppola was honoured at the screening and introduced the film in the presence of his granddaughter, Gia Coppola.

Lino Guanciale an Italian actor hosted the opening ceremony. Viggo Mortensen and Johnny Depp were honoured with the Lifetime Achievement Awards. In the festival, an international competition featuring 18 titles hailing from 29 countries were presented. The official image of the event is dedicated to Marcello Mastroianni, on the occasion of his birth centenary, which is taken from his character Guido Anselmi in the 1964 film 8½ by Federico Fellini. Pablo Trapero, an Argentine film producer, editor, and director is serving as the jury president of the competition section.

The presentation ceremony on 26 October 2024, was hosted by Geppi Cucciari, an Italian stand-up comedian, actress, radio host, and television presenter, marking her third time in a row as host. The jury awarded the best film award to Bound in Heaven a romantic crime drama by Huo Xin of China. Modì, Three Days on the Wing of Madness by Johnny Depp was the closing film of the festival run on 26 October. Johnny Depp received the Lifetime Achievement Award from festival director Paola Malanga and Riccardo Scamarcio before the screening of his film.

The festival formally closed on 27 October 2024, with the preview of four episodes of the third season of Life of Carlo by Carlo Verdone and Valerio Vestoso; a series of screenings for the History of Cinema section and the screenings of the award-winning films.

== Jury ==
=== Progressive Cinema Competition Award ===
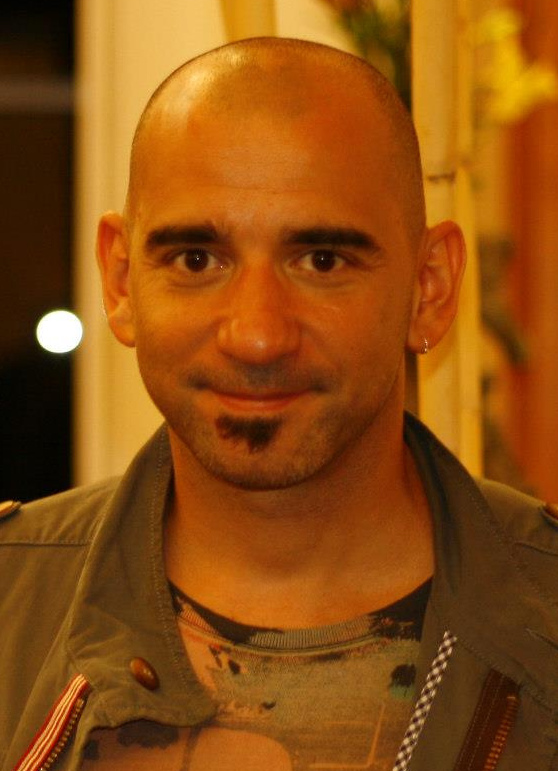
Pablo Trapero, Jury President

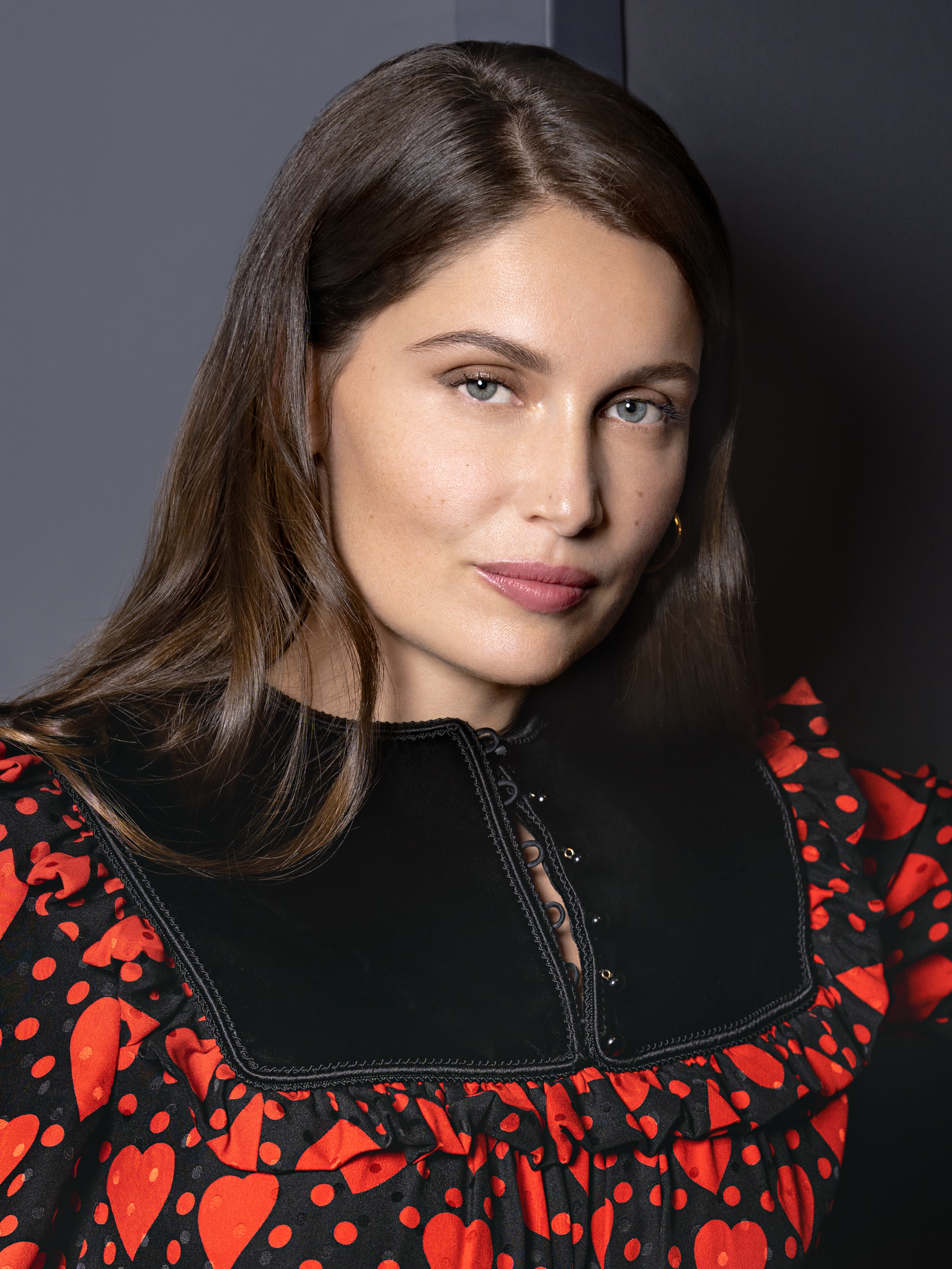
Laetitia Casta, Jury member

- Pablo Trapero, Argentine film producer, editor, and director – president
- Francesca Calvelli, Italian film editor .
- Laetitia Casta, French model and actress
- Gail Egan, American producer
- Dennis Lehane, writer and screenwriter from the United States

=== Best First Work Award BNL BNP Paribas ===
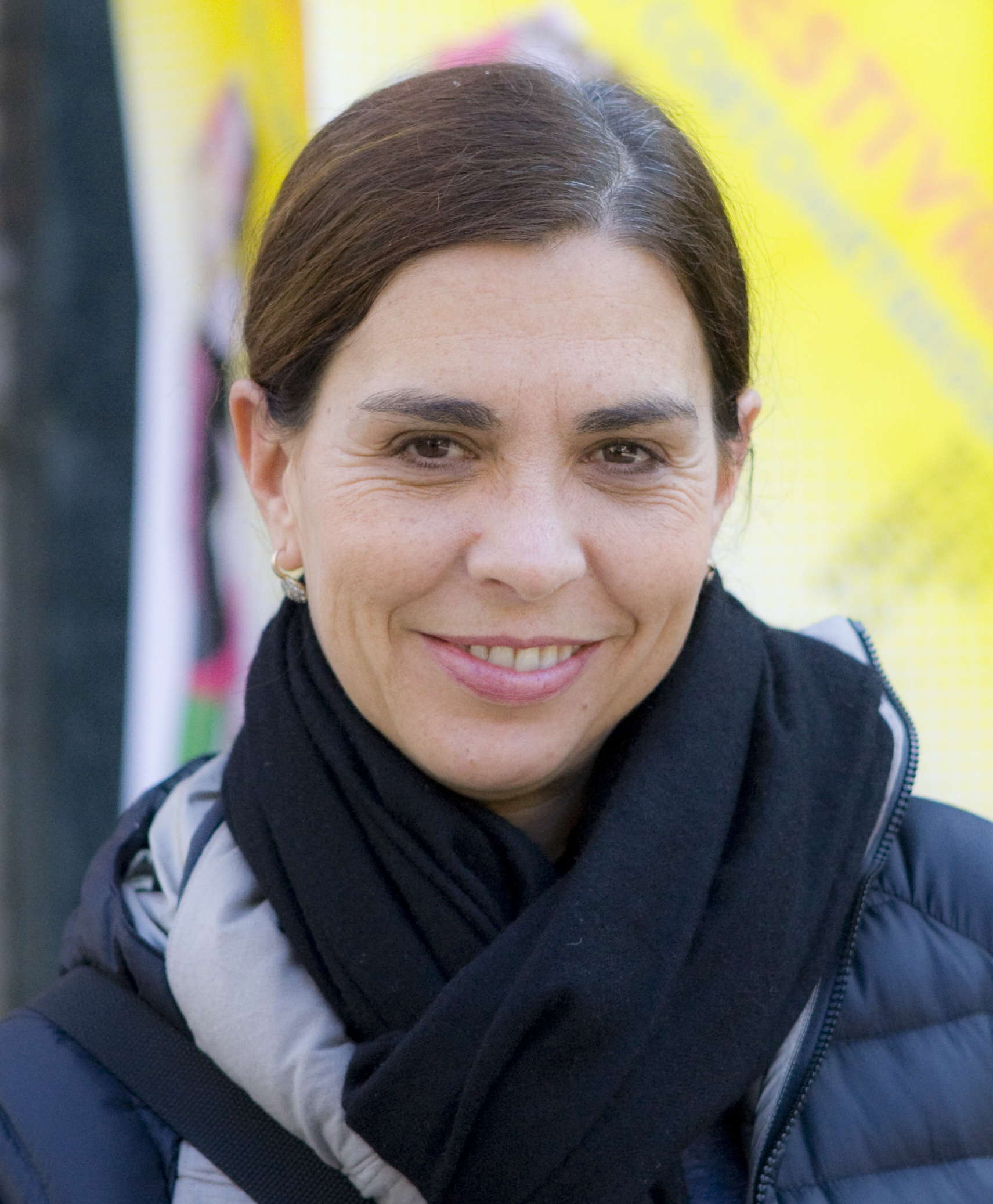
Francesca Comencini, Jury President

- Francesca Comencini, Italian film director and screenwriter – president
- Kaili Peng, producer, composer and writer
- Antoine Reinartz, French actor

== Events ==
=== Pre-opening of the festival ===
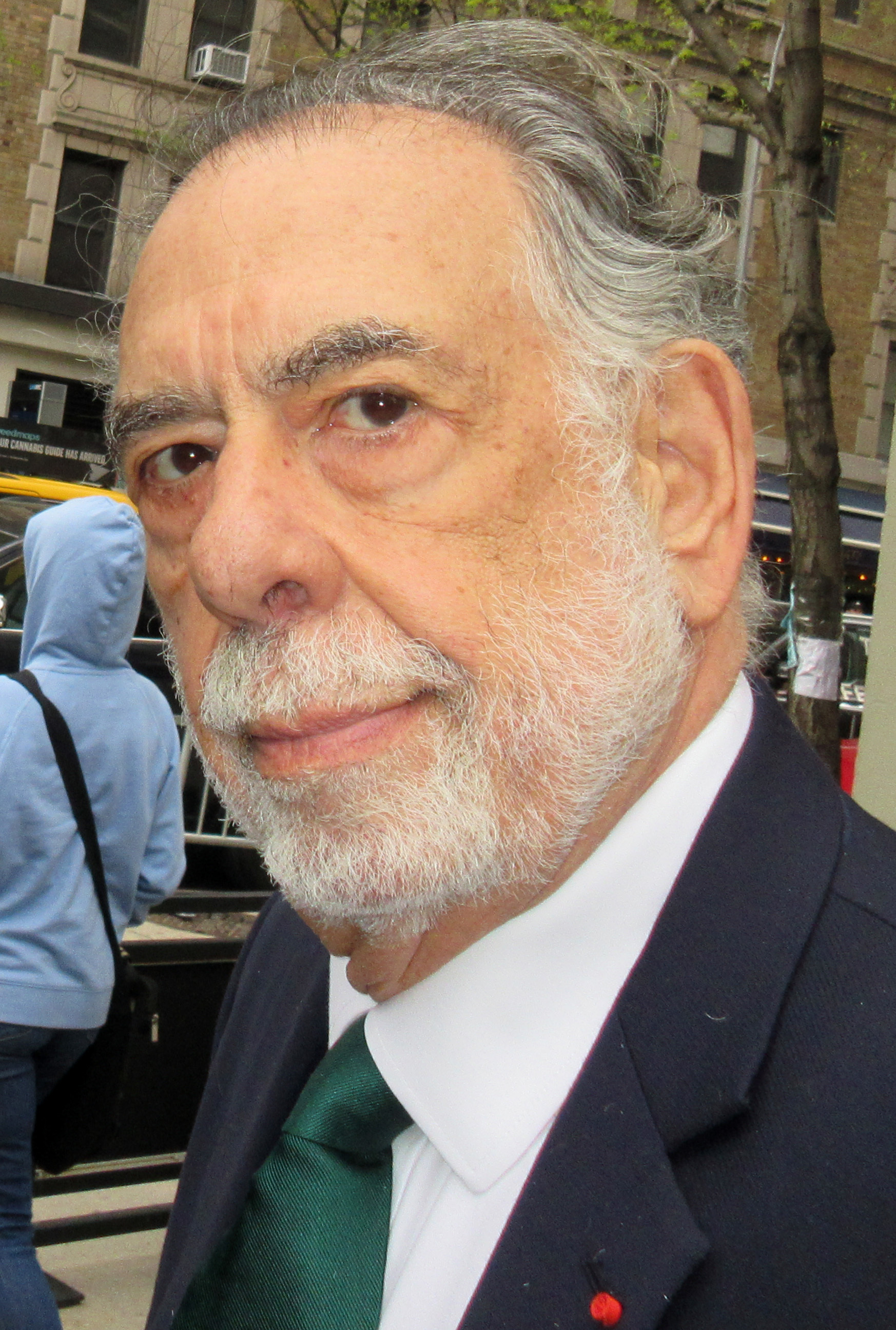
Francis Ford Coppola in 2019

On 14 October 2024, Cinecittà Studios hosted the Italian premiere of the 2024 film Megalopolis by the Italian-American director Francis Ford Coppola, with a screening introduced by the director himself. The event was streamed live at the Auditorium Parco della Musica's Sala Petrassi as the pre-opening of the festival. During the evening a special tribute was paid to the director.

=== Felicitation of Marcello Mastroianni ===
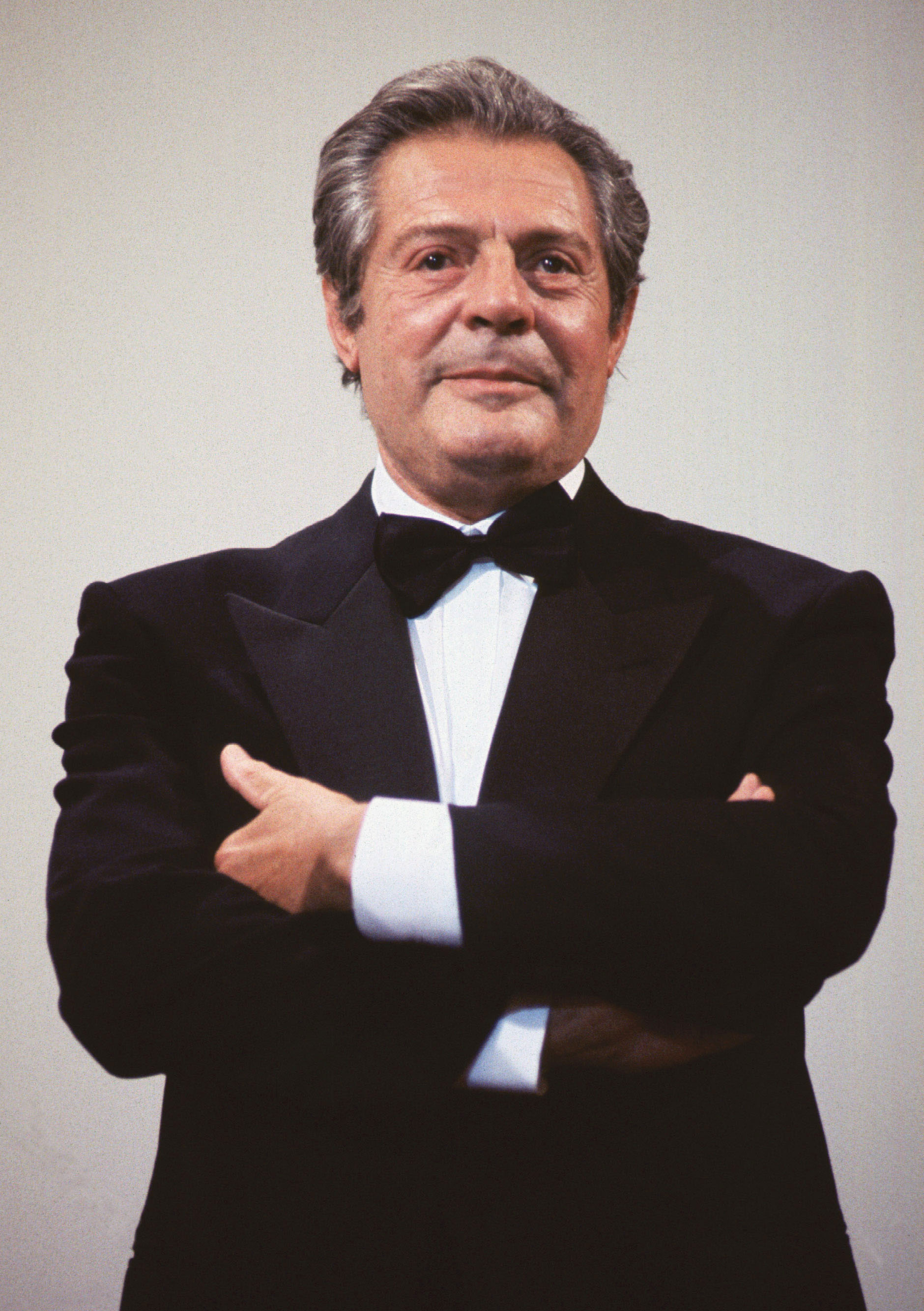
Marcello Mastroianni, in 1990

Festa del Cinema organized a large retrospective of films, some in restored versions, that saw him collaborate with directors such as Federico Fellini, Vittorio De Sica, Ettore Scola, Pietro Germi; documentaries on the life and works of the great interpreter; exhibitions and displays set up between the Auditorium Parco della Musica Ennio Morricone and the Casa del Cinema; and a meeting with the actress Chiara Mastroianni - daughter of the actor and Catherine Deneuve - to whom the Festa will dedicate a special tribute. He will also be the protagonist of the official image of the nineteenth edition.

=== Master classes ===
- Viggo Mortensen, American actor, musician, and filmmaker
- Dennis Lehane, American author
- Chiara Mastroianni, French actress and singer

=== Events relating to social issues ===
In 2024, the film festival continued its dedication to social issues and environmental concerns. Events took place at the Fondazione Policlinico Universitario Agostino Gemelli IRCCS with MediCinema Italia ETS, Rebibbia Penitentiary Complex, the Rebibbia "Germana Stefanini" women's prison, the Latina prison, and the Casal del Marmo juvenile penal institute.

Save the Children was the Social Partner for the nineteenth edition, showcasing a screening of its projects.

During Pink October, which focuses on breast cancer awareness, Novartis presented the DISTANCES series: Life always finds a way.

A Charity Gala Dinner was organized to support the Italian Red Cross.

The Fondazione Cinema per Roma, in collaboration with Azienda Comunale Elettricità e Acque—Electricity and Water Municipal Utility (ACEA), launched the contest "I mille volti dell'acqua" (The Thousand Faces of Water) to explore the theme of water through the perspectives of young filmmakers and renowned directors. Additionally, the event included a retrospective section titled "Drops of Cinema", featuring seven films designed to raise public awareness about the importance of water as a resource.

=== Celebration of world of music ===
- Screenings of series on the life and work of artists such as Bruce Springsteen American rock singer, songwriter, and guitarist, Vinicio Capossela Italian singer-songwriter, poet and novelist, Mario Merola Italian singer and actor, Franco Califano Italian lyricist, composer, singer-songwriter, author and actor, and Pivio, and Aldo De Scalzi two Italian composers.
- The guitarist for American rock band Talking Heads, Jerry Harrison, will meet Fest audiences on the occasion of the screening of 1984 American concert film, Stop Making Sense – 40th Anniversary by American filmmaker Jonathan Demme.
- At the Teatro Olimpico, the Italian Association of Composers of Music for Film puts on an event devoted to soundtracks and film scores.
- Every day, the festival red carpet thrilled to the sound design of Federico Sacchi Musicteller.

== Official sections ==
- Progressive Cinema Competition
- Freestyle
- Grand public
- Special screenings
- Best of 2024
- History of cinema
- Special events

=== Pre-opening and Opening films ===
English title	Original title	Director(s)	Production country(ies)
Pre-opening film
Megalopolis		Francis Ford Coppola	United States
Opening film
The Great Ambition	Berlinguer. La grande ambizione	Andrea Segre	Italy, Belgium, Bulgaria

=== Progressive Cinema Competition - Visions for the World of Tomorrow ===
English title	Original title	Director(s)	Production country(ies)
100 Litres of Gold		Teemu Nikki	Finland, Italy
The Tree	L'albero	Sara Petraglia	Italy
The Art of Nothing	L'Art d'être heureux	Stefan Liberski	Belgium, France
Bound in Heaven	Kun bang shang tian tang	Huo Xin	China
The Great Ambition	Berlinguer. La grande ambizione	Andrea Segre	Italy, Belgium, Bulgaria
Bring Them Down		Christopher Andrews	Ireland, UK, Belgium
The Choice	Le Choix	Gilles Bourdos	France
About Luis	Es geht um Luis	Lucia Chiarla	Germany
Greedy People		Potsy Ponciroli	United States
The Island of Idealists	L'isola degli idealisti	Elisabetta Sgarbi	Italy
Jazzy		Morrisa Maltz	United States
Reading Lolita in Tehran		Eran Riklis	Italy, Israel
Night Call	La nuit se traine	Michiel Blanchart	Belgium, France
They Will Be Dust	Polvo serán	Carlos Marqués-Marcet	Spain, Italy, Switzerland
Beloved Tropic	Querido trópico	Ana Endara	Panama, Colombia
Spirit World		Eric Khoo	France, Singapore, Japan
Paradise for Sale		Luca Barbareschi	Italy, France
The Trainer		Tony Kaye	United States

=== Freestyle ===
==== Films ====
English title	Original title	Director(s)	Production country(ies)
Arsa		Masbedo	Italy
Pierce	Cì xīn qiè gŭ	Nelicia Low	Singapore, Taiwan, Poland
Hello Child		Edgardo Pistone	Italy
Ghostlight		Kelly O'Sullivan, Alex Thompson	United States
Grand Theft Hamlet		Pinny Grylls, Sam Crane	United Kingdom – documentary
Marko Polo		Elisa Fuksas	Italy
McVeigh		Mike Ott	USA
Christmas After Hours		Gianfranco Firriolo	Italy – documentary
Nottefonda		Giuseppe Miale Di Mauro	Italy
On Falling		Laura Carreira	United Kingdom, Portugal
Sunlight		Nina Conti	United States
Under a Blue Sun	מתחת לשמש כחולה	Daniel Mann	France, Israel – documentary

==== Arts ====
English title	Original title	Director(s)	Production countr y(ies)
Waiting for King Lear	Aspettando Re Lear	Alessandro Preziosi	Italy
The Tirana Plot		Manfredi Lucibello	Italy
Duse, The Greatest		Sonia Bergamasco	Italy
Franco Califano - I Will Not Hold You Back		Antonio Mondini	Italy
My dear Giulia! Giorgio		Maria Mauti	Italy
I Am Martin Parr		Lee Shulman	France, United Kingdom
Italo Calvino in the Cities		Davide Ferrario	Italy
Leonardo da Vinci		Ken Burns, Sarah Burns, David McMahon	United States
Musicians with the Pianola		Matteo Malatesta	Italy
Pellizza Painter from Volpedo		Francesco Fei	Italy
Stones and Bricks		Saeid Shahparnia	Iran, Italy
The King of Naples - History and Legend by Mario Merola		Massimo Ferrari	Italy
Road Diary: Bruce Springsteen and the E Street Band		Thom Zimny	United States
They say about me		Isabella Mari	Italy

==== Series ====
English title	Original title	Director(s)	Production country y(ies)
My Brilliant Friend	L'amica geniale	Laura Bispuri	Italy
This Is Not Hollywood: Avetrana	Avetrana - Qui non è Hollywood	Pippo Mezzapesa	Italy
Bellas Artes		Gastón Duprat & Mariano Cohn	Spain, Argentina
The Count of Monte Cristo	Le Comte de Monte Cristo	Bille August	Italy, France
La Máquina		Gabriel Ripstein	Mexico
Miss Fallaci		Luca Ribuoli, Giacomo Martelli, Alessandra Gonnella	Italy
Life of Carlo	Vita da Carlo	Carlo Verdone, Valerio Vestoso	Italy

=== Grand public ===
English title	Original title	Director(s)	Production country y(ies)
The House of Gazes	La casa degli sguardi	Luca Zingaretti	Italy
Conclave		Edward Berger	United Kingdom, United States
Eternal Visionary	Eterno visionario	Michele Placido	Italy, Belgium
Here Now	Fino alla fine	Gabriele Muccino	Italy
Hey Joe		Claudio Giovannesi	Italy
Libre		Mélanie Laurent	France
Longlegs		Oz Perkins	United States
Bare Hands	Mani nude	Mauro Mancini	Italy
The Thieving Magpie	La pie voleuse	Robert Guédiguian	France

In co-production with Alice nella città

The autonomous parallel section unfolding within Rome Film Fest dedicated to younger generations.

English title	Original title	Director(s)	Production country y(ies)
The Boy with Pink Pants	Il ragazzo dai pantaloni rosa	Margherita Ferri	Italy
The Children's Train		Cristina Comencini	Italy
The Dead Don't Hurt		Viggo Mortensen	United States
Modì, Three Days on the Wing of Madness	Tre giorni sulle ali della follia	Johnny Depp	United Kingdom, Hungary, Italy
The Return		Uberto Pasolini	France, Greece, Italy, United Kingdom
Saturday Night		Jason Reitman	United States
Story of a Night		Paolo Costella	Italy
Superheroes		Stefano Chiantini	Italy, France
U.S. Palmese		Manetti Bros.	Italy
La Vallée des fous		Xavier Beauvois	France
We Live in Time		John Crowley	United Kingdom

=== Special screenings ===
In co-production with Alice nella città

The autonomous parallel section unfolding within Rome Film Fest dedicated to younger generations.

English title	Original title	Director(s)	Production country y(ies)
100 of These Years	100 di questi anni	Michela Andreozzi, Massimiliano Bruno Claudia Gerini, Edoardo Leo, Francesca Mazzoleni, Rocco Papaleo, Sydney Sibilia	Italy
Ago		Giangiacomo De Stefano	Italy
Antidote		James Jones	United Kingdom
Everyone's House		Manetti Bros.	Italy – short film
Bad Masters		Roberto Orazi	Italy – documentary
As if there were no tomorrow		Riccardo Cremona, Matteo Keffer	Italy – documentary
Shattered Things Shine		Marta Basso, Sara Cecconi, Carlotta Cosmai, Alice Malingri, Lilian Sassanelli	Italy – documentary
Blanket Wearer	Damyoreul ibeun saram	Park Jeong-mi	South Korea – documentary
Dike – Life as a Magistrate		Caterina Crescini	Italy – documentary
Heroic! 100 years of passion and sports stories		Giuseppe Marco Albano	Italy – documentary
Sharp Corner		Jason Buxton	Canada, Ireland
State of Silence		Santiago Maza	Mexico – documentary
Ferrari: Fury and the Monster		Steve Hoover	United States – documentary
The Island of Care		Alex Grazioli	Italy – documentary
Liliana		Ruggero Gabbai	Italy – documentary
Ukrainian Lyrics		Francesca Mannocchi	Italy – documentary

=== Best of 2024 ===
English title	Original title	Director(s)	Production country(ies)
Anora		Sean Baker	United States
Architecton		Viktor Kossakovsky	Germany, France
The Balconettes	Les Femmes au Balcon	Noémie Merlant	France
Emilia Pérez		Jacques Audiard	France, Mexico
En fanfare		Emmanuel Courcol	France
Ernest Cole: Lost and Found		Raoul Peck	France, United States
Les Femmes au balcon		Noémie Merlant	France
Megalopolis		Francis Ford Coppola	United States
Nasty		Tudor Giurgiu, Cristian Pascariu, Tudor D. Popescu	Romania
On Becoming a Guinea Fowl		Rungano Nyoni	Ireland, United Kingdom, United States, Zambia
The Seed of the Sacred Fig	دانه انجیر مقدس	Mohammad Rasoulof	Iran, Germany, France
Small Things like These		Tim Mielants	Ireland, Belgium
The Substance		Coralie Fargeat	United Kingdom, United States, France

=== History of cinema ===
==== Documentary ====
English title	Original title	Director(s)	Production country(ies)
Bogart: Life Comes in Flashes		Kathryn Ferguson	United States
Once Upon a Time in Naples		Ciro Ippolito, Marco Giusti	Italy
Being Godard and de Beauregard	Dans la tete de Godard et de Beauregard	Hind R. Boukli	France
Delon/Melville, la solitude de deux samouraïs		Laurent Galinon	France
Homosexualité au cinema, les chemins de la victoire		Sonia Medina	France
John Cassavetes par Thierry Jousse		Camille Clavel	France
Mario Verdone: The Traveling Critic		Luca Verdone	Italy
Le scenario de ma vie, François Truffaut		David Teboul	France
Titanus 1904		Giuseppe Rossi	Italy
Valerio Zurlini, painter of feelings		Sandra Marti	France

=== Special events ===
==== Marcello Mastroianni 100 ====
English title	Original title	Director(s)	Production country(ies)
Hello Marcello!	Ciao Marcello!	Edited by Paolo Luciani	Italy
Hello Marcello. Mastroianni the Anti-Star	Ciao Marcello. Mastroianni l'antidivo	Fabrizio Corallo	Italy
Ghosts of Rome	Fantasmi a Roma	Antonio Pietrangeli	Italy
Dirty Hands Three-part TV series	Le mani sporche	Elio Petri	Italy
Mastroianni. A Casanova of Our Times		Antonello Branca	Italy
Everybody's Fine	Stanno tutti bene	Giuseppe Tornatore	Italy, France

==== Gian Maria Volonté, thirty years after his death ====
Gian Maria Volonté, Italian actor and activist, who died on 6 December 1994.

English title	Original title	Director(s)	Production country(ies)
The Death of Mario Ricci	La mort de Mario Ricci	Claude Goretta	Switzerland, France

==== Anica 80 ====
English title	Original title	Director(s)	Production country(ies)
There's Still Tomorrow	C'è ancora domani	Paola Cortellesi	Italy
I'm Starting from Three	Ricomincio da tre	Massimo Troisi	Italy

==== Restorations ====
English title	Original title	Director(s)	Production country(ies)
From the East	D'Est	Chantal Akerman	Belgium, France
The Seduction of Mimi	Mimì metallurgico ferito nell'onore	Lina Wertmüller	Italy
The Crying of the Old Maids	Il pianto delle zitelle	Giacomo Pozzi Bellini	Italy
Unknown Woman	Senza sapere niente di lei	Luigi Comencini	Italy
Finally Sunday!	Vivement dimanche!	François Truffaut	France

==== The Anniversaries ====
Year of release	English title	Original title	Director(s)	Production country(ies)
1974	Watch Out, We're Mad!	...altrimenti ci arrabbiamo!	Marcello Fondato	Italy, Spain
1994	Lamerica		Gianni Amelio	Italy, France, Switzerland
1994	Pulp Fiction		Quentin Tarantino	United States
1954	Sabrina		Billy Wilder	United States
1964	Blood and Black Lace	Sei donne per l'assassino	Mario Bava	Italy, France, West Germany
1974	The Sugarland Express		Steven Spielberg	United States

==== Sony Columbia 100 ====
English title	Original title	Director(s)	Production country(ies)
Gilda		Charles Vidor	United States

==== Homage to Alain Delon ====
Alain Delon, French actor, film producer, screenwriter, and singer who died on 18 August 2024.

English title	Original title	Director(s)	Production country(ies)
Borsalino		Jacques Deray	France, Italy

==== Johnny Depp ====
English title	Original title	Director(s)	Production country(ies)
The Brave		Johnny Depp	United States

==== Viggo Mortensen ====
English title	Original title	Director(s)	Production country(ies)
Falling		Viggo Mortensen	Canada, United Kingdom

==== Drops of cinema ====
The Fondazione Cinema per Roma, in collaboration with Azienda Comunale Elettricità e Acque—Electricity and Water Municipal Utility (ACEA), is presenting a retrospective "Drops of cinema", dedicated to water. The section consists of seven films, aimed at increasing public awareness of the value of water resource.

Year	English title	Original title	Director(s)	Production country(ies)
1953	From Here to Eternity		Fred Zinnemann	United States
1976	Jaws		Steven Spielberg	United States
1944	Lifeboat		Alfred Hitchcock	United States
1980	Lightning Over Water		Wim Wenders, Nicholas Ray	West Germany, France
1983	Nostalghia		Andrei Tarkovsky	Italy, Soviet Union
2017	The Shape of Water		Guillermo del Toro	United States, Mexico
2013	Watermark		Jennifer Baichwal and Edward Burtynsky	Canada – documentary

== Alice nella città ==
The autonomous parallel section Alice nella città unfolding within Rome Film Fest dedicated to younger generations.

=== Opening film ===
- Nickel Boys, RaMell Ross, United States

=== Competition ===
- Bird, by Andrea Arnold, United Kingdom, France, Germany, United States
- The Courageous, Jasmin Gordon Switzerland
- Flow by Gints Zilbalodis, Belgium, France, Latvia
- Holy Cow by Louise Courvoisier, France
- Julie Keeps Quiet, by Leonardo Van Dijl, Sweden, Belgium
- Lads, by Julien Menanteau, Belgium, France
- Milano, by Christina Vandekerckhove, Belgium
- The Outrun by Nora Fingscheidt, Germany, United Kingdom
- A Real Pain by Jesse Eisenberg Poland, United States
- Rita by Paz Vega, Spain
- Three Sisters, Lisa Brühlmann, United States
- Under the Volcano by Damian Kocur, Poland
- When the Light Breaks by Rúnar Rúnarsson, Iceland, Netherlands, Croatia, France
- Non dirmi che hai paura by Yasemin Şamdereli, Italy

=== Out of competition ===
- Luce by Silvia Luzi and Luca Bellino, Italy
- Mi bestia, Camila Beltrán, Colombia, France
- Rabia, Mareike Engelhardt, France, Germany
- Janet Planet, Annie Baker, United States
- Sur un fil, by Reda Kateb, France
- War on Education - Scelte Classe, Stefano Di Pietro, Netherlands

=== Special screenings ===
- Megalopolis, Francis Ford Coppola, United States
- Savages, by Claude Barras, Switzerland, France, Belgium
- A Sudden Case of Christmas, by Peter Chelsom, United States
- Blitz, by Steve McQueen,
- The Boy with Pink Pants by Margherita Ferri, Italy
- 100 di questi anni', M. Andreozzi, M. Bruno, C. Gerini, E. Leo, F. Mazzoleni, R. Papaleo, S. Sibilia, Italy
- In viaggio con mio figlio, Tony Goldwyn, United States
- A Look Through His Lens, Matthew Berkowitz, Gregory Hoblit, United States, France, United Kingdom, Ireland
- Ha toccato!, Giusi Cataldo, Italy
- Lukiskes Diletta, Di Nicolantonio, Italy

=== Panorama Italia – Competition ===
- No More Trouble by Cosa rimane di una tempesta Tommaso Romanelli, Italy
- Il mio compleanno, Christian Filippi, Italy
- L'era d'oro, Camilla Iannetti, Italy
- L'origine del mondo Rossella Inglese Italia, 2024, 109’
- I racconti del mare Luca Severi, Italy
- Il complottista, Valerio Ferrara, Italy
- La cosa migliore, Federico Ferrone, Italy

=== Panorama Italia – Out of competition ===
- Anime galleggianti, Maria Giménez Cavallo, Italy
- Still Here, Suranga D. Katugampala, Italy, France, Sri Lanka
- Balentes, Giovanni Columbu, Italy Germany
- Squali, Alberto Rizzi, Italy

=== Panorama Italia – Special Screenings ===
- Ogni pensiero vola, Alice Ambrogi Italy
- Come quando eravamo piccoli, Camilla Filippi, Italy

==== Series ====
- Adoration by Stefano Mordini – TV series, Italy
- The Bad Guy, Giancarlo Fontana, Giuseppe G. Stasi, Italy
- The Law According to Lidia Poët, Season 2 Letizia Lamartyre, Matteo Rovere, Pippo Mezzapesa, Italy
- Never Too Late, Lorenzo Vignolo, Salvatore de Chirico Italy
- Nudes Season 2, Laura Luchetti, Marco Danieli, Italy

== Awards and winners ==
A jury chaired by the director, screenwriter and producer Pablo Trapero awarded the following prizes to the films in festival:

=== Progressive Cinema Competition - Visions for the World of Tomorrow ===
- Best Film: Bound in Heaven by Huo Xin, China
- Jury Grand Prix: Night Call by Michiel Blanchart
- Best Director: Morrisa Maltz for Jazzy
- Best Screenplay: Christopher Andrews for Bring Them Down
- Best Actress – Monica Vitti Award
  - Prize: Ángela Molina for They Will Be Dust
- Best Actor – Vittorio Gassman Award
  - Prize: Elio Germano for The Great Ambition
- Special Jury Prize: To the cast of women in Reading Lolita in Tehran

=== Best First Film Award ===
- Bound in Heaven by Huo Xin, China
- Hello Child by Edgardo Pistone, Italy
- Special Mention
  - Liu Hsiu-fu for Pierce by Nelicia Low

=== Audience Award ===
- Reading Lolita in Tehran by Eran Riklis

=== Lifetime Achievement Award ===
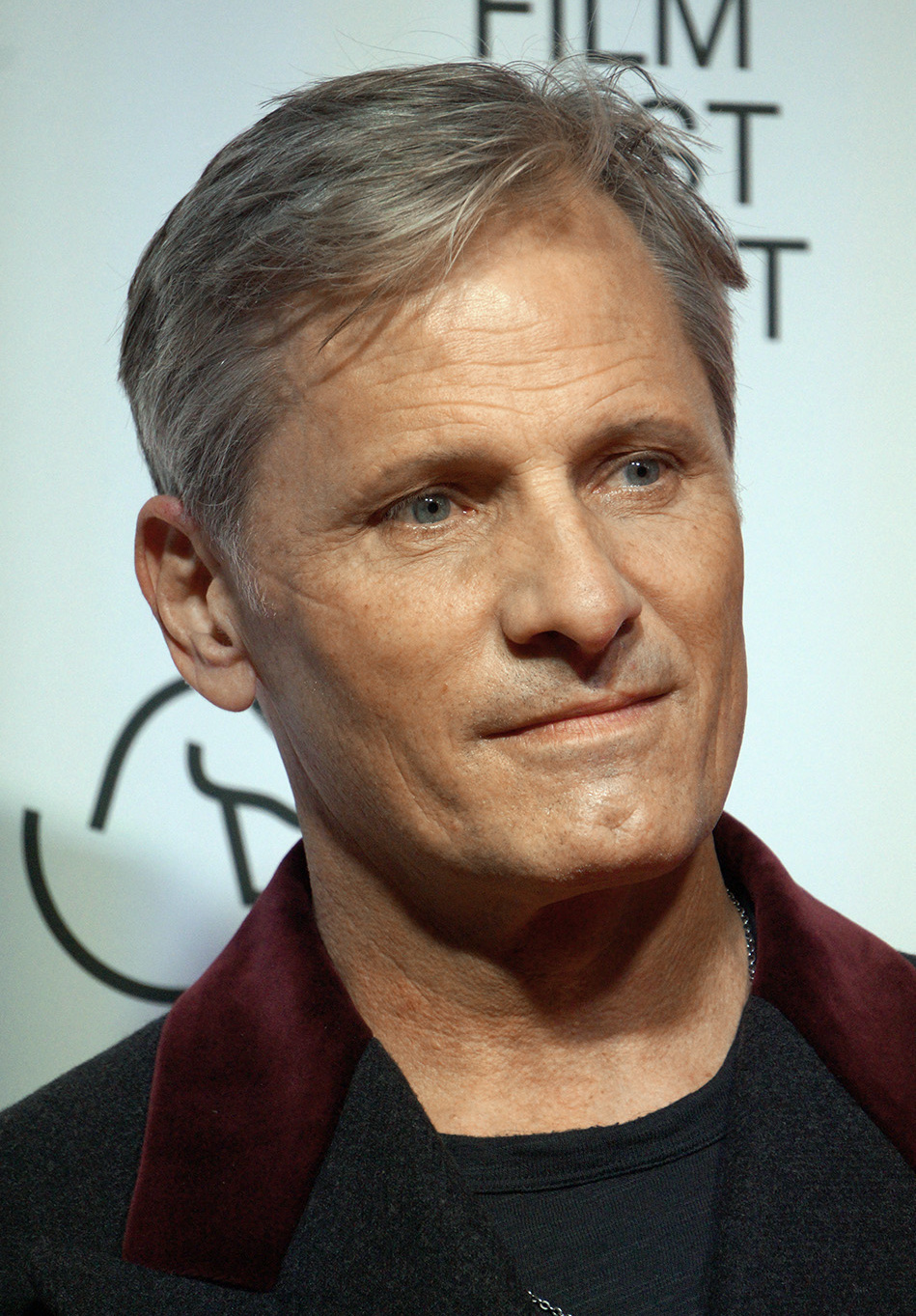
Viggo Mortensen, Lifetime Achievement Award

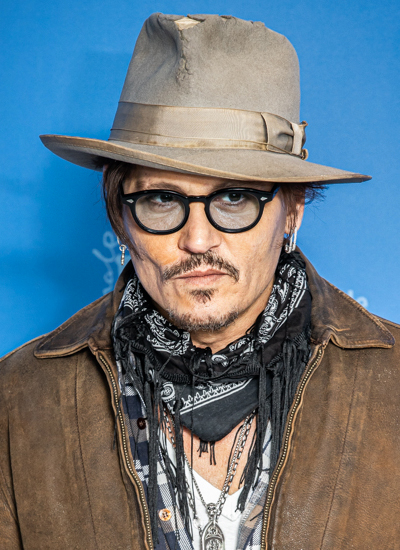
Johnny Depp, Lifetime Achievement Award

  - Viggo Mortensen
  - Johnny Depp

=== Alice nella città ===
- Best Film Award: Bird - Andrea Arnold, United Kingdom
- Raffaella Fioretta Award for Best Italian Film in Panorama Italia: No More Trouble - Cosa rimane di una tempesta - Tommaso Romanelli, Italy
- Special Mention: My Birthday - Christian Filippi, Italy
- Colorado-Rainbow Award for Best Debut Feature: Rita by Paz Vega, Spain
- RB Casting Award for Best Young Italian Actor: Zackari Delmas - My Birthday
- UNITA Under 35 Special Mention for Best Actor in the Panorama Italia Competition: Zackari Delmas - My Birthday
- Audience Golden Ciak Award in the Onde Corte Section: Al buio - Stefano Malchiodi, Italy (short film)
- Notorious Project Award for Best Concept Series: Udon alla carbonara - Edoardo Bigazzi, Italy
- Notorious Project Award for Best Concept Movie Rainbow Gloves - Andrea Gravagnuolo and Gianluca Cravero, Italy
- SIAE Award for Best Project in the Unbox Italy category: Sparare alle angurie - Antonio di Donato
