= Bound in Heaven =

- Film poster

Chinese name
- Simplified Chinese: 捆绑上天堂
Transcriptions
Standard Mandarin
- Hanyu Pinyin: Kǔnbǎng shàng tiāntáng
- Directed by: Huo Xin
- Written by: Huo Xin
- Based on: Bound in Heaven (捆绑上天堂) by Li Xiuwen
- Produced by: An Hanjin
- Starring: Ni Ni; Zhou You; Liao Fan
- Cinematography: Piao Songri
- Edited by: Zhang Chao; Tsai Yann-shan; Matthieu Laclau
- Music by: Zhi Shiliu; Yang Bowen
- Production companies: Such A Good Film Co; Shanghai Shigu Film Co., Ltd.; Alibaba Pictures (Beijing) Co., Ltd; Shanghai Lingguang Film Co., Ltd.
- Distributed by: Rediance Films
- Release date: 6 September 2024 (TIFF)
- Running time: 105 minutes
- Country: China
- Language: Mandarin

Bound in Heaven (Chinese: 捆绑上天堂) is a 2024 Chinese romantic crime drama film written and directed by Huo Xin in her directorial debut, starring Ni Ni, Zhou You and Liao Fan. It was adapted from 2003 novel of the same name by Li Xiuwen. The film had its world premiere at the 49th Toronto International Film Festival on September 6, 2024. It was also selected to compete for the Golden Shell at the 72nd San Sebastián International Film Festival on September 25, 2024, where it won FIPRESCI Award and Jury Prize for Best Cinematography (for Piao Songri).

== Plot ==
The film portrays a story where an exhausted woman (played by Ni Ni) rekindles the spirit of a man (played by Zhou You), whose heart has grown cold and desolate. Together, they embark on a journey of both physical and emotional liberation, bound tightly by desire and passion, navigating through an intense exploration of life and death.

== Cast ==
- Ni Ni as Xia You
- Zhou You as Xu Zitai
- Liao Fan as Song

== Release ==
On September 6, 2024, Bound in Heaven had its world premiere in the "Centrepiece" section of the 2024 Toronto International Film Festival.

Bound in Heaven also screened in the Main Competition section of the 72nd San Sebastián International Film Festival on September 25, 2024, and at the 19th Rome Film Festival in the 'Progressive Cinema Competition - Visions for the World of Tomorrow' section in October 2024.

== Accolades ==
Award	Date of ceremony	Category	Recipient(s)	Result	Ref.
San Sebastián International Film Festival	September 28, 2024	Golden Shell	Bound in Heaven	Nominated	
San Sebastián International Film Festival	September 28, 2024	FIPRESCI Award	Bound in Heaven	Won	
San Sebastián International Film Festival	September 28, 2024	Jury Prize for Best Cinematography	Piao Songri	Won	
Philadelphia Film Festival	October 27, 2024	Best Feature	Bound in Heaven	Won	
Rome Film Festival	October 27, 2024	Best Film in Progressive Cinema Competition - Visions for the World of Tomorrow	Bound in Heaven	Won	
Rome Film Festival	October 27, 2024	Best First Film Award	Bound in Heaven	Won	
