= Rome Film Festival =

Film fest that takes place in Rome, Italy

Festa del Cinema di Roma
- Opening film: Life Goes This Way by Riccardo Milani
- Location: Auditorium Parco della Musica, Rome
- Founded: 2006
- Most recent: 2025
- No. of films: 100
- Festival date: Opening: October 13, 2026; Closing: October 25, 2026
- Language: International
- Website: http://www.romacinemafest.it/

Current: 20th Rome Film Festival
- 21st 19th

International Rome Film Fest (original: Festa del Cinema di Roma) is a film festival that takes place in Rome during the month of October. In 2022, the festival was officially recognized as a competitive festival by the International Federation of Film Producers Associations.

== History ==
The Rome Film Festival was established in 2006 by the initiative of former Rome mayor Walter Veltroni. Cinema per Roma Foundation, the RFF's operator, was established in 2007 with the support of several state bodies – Camera di Commercio di Roma, Fondazione Musica per Roma, Lazio and Roma regional governments. The RFF was created to support and promote cinema art in Rome and Lazio. However, Veltroni's ambitions were high, he dreamed the RFF to rival Venice. The inaugural edition was highlighted by 12 world premieres, including The Departed by Martin Scorsese, and the presence of such stars as Monica Bellucci, Nicole Kidman, Gabriele Salvatores, Harrison Ford, Sean Connery, and others. The RFF opened with 95 films in the official selection distributed across several sections: Premiere, Sezione Cinema, Special Events (for ‘border on genre cinema’), Extra (‘ultra-cineaste section’), and Alice in the City for kids and young adults. The event also featured industry sections New Cinema Network and New International Projects. The Best Film award was presented along with a €200,000 cash prize. The festival reported an attendance of 480,000 visitors and more than 100,000 sold tickets.

In 2008, Gian Luigi Rondi was appointed the RFF president, succeeding Goffredo Bettini. The new mayor of Rome, Gianni Alemanno, was sceptical about the event and called it useless. Overall, the third RFF festival was considered weaker than the second. In 2009, Piera Detassis was appointed art director of the RFF.

Rondi stepped down in 2012, succeeded by Marco Mueller. The new head of the festival lobbied for new dates for the RFF – it was shifted from October to late November in order to avoid a direct schedule conflict with the Turin Film Festival. However, two years later the dates were shifted back.

In 2015, the province's government had left the Foundation and was replaced by Cinecitta. In the same year, Antonio Monda was appointed the RFF's art director. An experienced and renowned professional, Monda is an author, exhibition curator, film director, and lecturer at New York University's Film and Television Department. Under Monda, the festival was evolving rapidly. His vision was to make the event a celebration of cinema, not a competition between directors and teams, so the competitive section was eliminated. Monda managed to turn the festival into a high-profile world class event and eased the tension between the RFF and rival festivals. In 2019, he introduced two new sections, Duel, an open talk on film-related topics, and Loyalty/Betrayal, dedicated to film adaptations of famous literary works. In 2022, Monda's second three-year term expired, and he did not receive an offer for a third term, as decided by the Cinema per Roma Foundation. The management did not comment on this move, and a scandal erupted in the public sphere. Monda opposed the dismissal and demanded explanations. As journalists found out, Rome's mayor Gualtieri and Minister of Culture Dario Franceschini decided to dismiss Monda following the complaints of Goffredo Bettini and his sister Fabia, who manages Alice nella Città section of the RFF. Wes Anderson, Meryl Streep, Martin Scorsese, Paolo Sorrentino, Marco Bellocchio, and many other Hollywood and international stars voiced the support of Monda and condemned the dismissal, but to no avail. He was replaced by Paola Malanga, ex deputy director of RAI Cinema. Gianluca Farinelli became president, succeeding Laura Delli Colli. He stepped down in 2025 and was succeeded by Salvo Nastasi.

In 2022, FIAPF officially recognized the RFF as a Competitive Festival. That year’s edition was marked with the reintroduction of a competitive section as well as with such new open sections as Paso Doble, an encounter between authors, and Absolute Beginners, where established authors recount the story of their debut in cinema.

== Profile ==
The RFF is produced by the Cinema per Roma Foundation with support of the chamber of commerce of Rome, Lazio region, Fondazione Musica Per Roma and the Ministry of Culture through Istituto Luce Cinecittà. The event's annual budget is around €6 mln. The Festival's principal venue is the Auditorium Parco della Musica, however, many screenings and events take place in other locations around the city, such as Cinema Giulio Cesare, Teatro Palladium, Scena, Cinema Nuovo Sacher, Policlinico Gemelli, and many more.

Launched in 2006, the Business Street started as a 4-days long film market. Already in 2007, it had attracted more than 350 buyers and sellers from 40 countries. By 2011, it had progressed into an industry event that concentrated on cultivation of new projects. The Business Street was relaunched in 2015 as Mercato Internazionale Audiovisivo or Intl. Audiovisual Market (MIA).

=== Sections ===
The Rome Film Festival official program is divided into several sections:

- Cinema d'Oggi – a selection of feature films, with priority given to world premieres. At the end of each screening, the audience votes for the People's Choice Award | Cinema d'Oggi.
- Gala – feature films that are world premieres, international or European premieres.
- Mondo Genere – feature films from various genres that are world, international or European premieres, with priority given to world premieres.
- Prospettive Italia – world premieres highlighting new trends in Italian cinema. At the end of each screening, the audience votes for the People's Choice Award | Cinema Italia (Fiction) and the People's Choice Award | Cinema Italia (Documentary).
- Progressive Cinema – Visions Of Tomorrow’s World – an international competition, launched in 2022.
- Alice nella Città – a section for children cinema, divided in two competitive subsections, one for over-12 films and the other under-12.

=== Awards ===
The Rome Film Festival award is a silver statuette shaped after the Roman Emperor Marcus Aurelius statue, placed in Michelangelo's Campidoglio Square.

BNL People’s Choice Award (Gala) – the winning film's prize money is given to its Italian distributor, or, if no Italian distributor buys it within six months, to its international seller.

==== Gillo Pontecorvo Award ====
In 2026, from 21st edition of the festival an award 'Gillo Pontecorvo Award' in memory of Gillo Pontecorvo on the twentieth anniversary of his death was established. It was presented by his son Marco Pontecorvo to Emmanuel Marre's A Man of His Time, the first recipient of the award.

==== Banca Ifis Music Award ====
Starting from the 21st edition in 2026, a new prize called the Banca Ifis Music Award was presented by Banca Ifis in partnership with the Rome Cinema Foundation and the Rome Music Foundation. Composer Nicola Piovani was the first person to receive this award.

== Editions ==
=== 2006 ===
2006 edition winners
- Best Film – Playing the Victim by Kirill Serebrennikov
- Best Actor – Giorgio Colangeli (in Salty Air)
- Jury Special Prize – This Is England by Shane Meadows
- IMAIE Acting Award – Sean Connery
- Best Actress – Ariane Ascaride (in Le voyage en Arménie)

=== 2014 ===
2014 edition winners
- 'Alice in the City' Award – Trash (Brazil, UK), directed by Stephen Daldry
- People’s Choice Award Cinema d’Oggi –12 Citizens (China), directed by Zu Ang
- People’s Choice Award Mondo Genere – Haider (India), directed by Vishal Bhardwaj
- People’s Choice Award Cinema Italia (Fiction) – Fino a qui tutto bene, directed by Roan Johnson
- People’s Choice Award Cinema Italia (Doc) – Looking for Kadija, directed by Francesco G. Raganato

=== 2022 ===
The 17th edition of the festival, from which it became competitive festival, took place from 13 to 23 October 2022.

=== 2023 ===
The 18th edition of the festival took place from 18 to 29 October 2023.

=== 2024 ===
The 19th edition of the festival took place from 16 to 27 October 2024 in the Auditorium Parco della Musica and attracted an audience of over 110,000.

2024 edition winners
- Best Film – Bound in Heaven by Huo Xin
- Jury Grand Prix – Night Call by Michiel Blanchart
- Best Director – Morrisa Maltz for Jazzy
- Best Screenplay – Christopher Andrews for Bring Them Down
- Best Actor – Elio Germano in The Great Ambition
- Best Actress – Ángela Molina in They Will Be Dust
- Jury Special Prize: Reading Lolita in Tehran by Eran Riklis
- Lifetime Achievement Award:
  - Viggo Mortensen
  - Johnny Depp

=== 2025 ===
The 20th edition of the festival took place from 15 to 26 October 2025. Paola Cortellesi, Italian actress, comedian, film director, screenwriter and producer, chaired the jury of the Progressive Cinema Competition at the festival.

=== 2026 ===
The 21st edition of the festival will take place from 13 to 25 October 2026. Javier Bardem, Tessa Ross and Julianne Moore will be honored with Lifetime Achievement Award.

== Winners through the years ==
=== Best Film ===
- 2007: Juno by Jason Reitman
- 2008: Opium War by Siddiq Barmak
- 2009: Broderskab by Nicolo Donato
- 2010: Kill Me Please by Olias Barco
- 2011: Un cuento chino by Sebastián Borensztein
- 2012: Marfa Girl by Larry Clark
- 2013: Tir by Alberto Fasulo
- 2022: January by Viesturs Kairišs
- 2023: Toll by Carolina Markowicz
- 2024: Bound in Heaven by Huo Xin, China

=== Best Actor ===
- 2007: Rade Šerbedžija (in Fugitive Pieces)
- 2008: Bohdan Stupka (in Serce na dloni)
- 2009: Sergio Castellitto (in Alza la testa)
- 2010: Toni Servillo (in Una vita tranquilla)
- 2011: Guillaume Canet (in Une vie meilleure)
- 2012: Jeremie Elkaim (in Hand in the Hand)
- 2013: Matthew McConaughey (in Dallas Buyers Club)

=== Best Actress ===
- 2007: Jiang Wenli (in And the Spring Comes)
- 2008: Donatella Finocchiaro (in Galantuomini)
- 2009: Helen Mirren (in The Last Station)
- 2010: All of the actresses (in Las buenas hierbas)
- 2011: Noomi Rapace (in Babycall)
- 2012: Isabella Ferrari (in And They Call It Summer)
- 2013: Scarlett Johansson (in Her)

=== Jury Special Prize ===
- 2010: Poll by Chris Kraus
- 2011: The Eye of the Storm by Fred Schepisi
- 2011: Circumstance by Maryam Keshavarz
- 2012: Alì ha gli occhi azzurri by Claudio Giovannesi
- 2013: Quod Erat Demonstrandum by Andrei Gruzsniczk

=== IMAIE Acting Award ===
- 2007: Sophia Loren
- 2008: Clint Eastwood
- 2009: Meryl Streep
- 2010: Julianne Moore
- 2011: Richard Gere

== See also ==
- Venice Film Festival
- Rome Quadriennale
- Rome Independent Cinema Festival
- Cento Pittori via Margutta
