= On Children =

Taiwanese television series

- Promotional poster
- Chinese: 你的孩子不是你的孩子
- Hanyu Pinyin: Nǐ De Háizi Bùshì Nǐ De Háizi
- Genre: Science fiction Anthology; Horror; Satire
- Created by: Wú Xiao-le
- Written by: Wang Hui-chu; Yang Wan-ju; Lin Ken-wei; Aozaru Shiao; Huang Yu-chia; Chen Cheng-yu
- Directed by: Chen Wei-ling
- Starring: See below
- Theme music composer: Waa Wei
- Ending theme: Don't cry Don't cry
- Composer: Waa Wei
- Country of origin: Taiwan
- Original languages: Mandarin; English; Hokkien
- No. of episodes: 10

Production
- Producer: Wu Zhi-yu
- Running time: 47 minutes
- Production company: Missmove Image Studio

Original release
- Release: July 7 – August 4, 2018

Related
- The Coming Through; Bodhisattva in Storm

On Children (Chinese: 你的孩子不是你的孩子; pinyin: Nǐ de háizǐ bùshì nǐ de háizǐ; lit. ''Your Child is not Your Child'') is a 2018 ten-part Mandarin-language TV series, directed by Chen Wei-ling and starring Troy Liu, Wang Yu-xuan, and Hsin-Yu Ling, based on the novel by Wu Xiaole. The plots are in anthology form with five different stories told in a world where individuals face the tragic consequences of social pressure, parental oppression and family dysfunction.

== Cast ==
- Troy Liu as Chi Pei-Wei
- Wang Yu-xuan as Liu Chiao-Yi
- Hsin-Yu Ling as Cheng Fang-Lan
- Emilia Chen as Emilia Chen
- Yu-Tung Lee as Shih Yu-Chieh
- Chiung-Hsuan Hsieh as Fang Mei-Chi
- Herbie Robert Baron as Chang Kai-Hsiang
- Chuan-Chen Yeh as Yang Chuan
- Liu Hsiu-fu as Chung Kuo-Yen
- Chung Hsin-ling as Kuo-Yen's mother
- Gingle Wang as Molly Lin
- Frances Wu as Nova Yang
- Chen Yi-wen as Liu Ching-Hui
- Elten Ting as Ling-Na
- Yu-Ping Wang as Lo Chih-Wei
- Hsin Shao as Chung Chia-Hung
- Mohammad Umar Afzal as Chien Sheng-Yao
- Ting-Hsuan Lin as Liu Chiao-Hsin
- Yen Tsao as Lu Chih-Hsiung
- Kai-Ling Hsu as Le-Le
- Ivy Yin as Molly's mother
- Moon Lee as Shih Yu-jie

== Episodes ==
No.	Title	Written by	Original release date
1–2	"Mother's Remote"; Transliteration: "Mamā de Yáokòng qi" (Chinese: 媽媽的遙控器)	Yu-Chu Chiang	July 7, 2018
Shu-Li discovers her son, Pei-Wei, forged his report cards and refuses to let him go on his middle school graduation trip. One night, a man sells her a remote control that allows her to rewind Pei-Wei's life, which she uses both to help him repeat his studies and to punish him. Pei-Wei realizes he is in a time loop but is forced to obey Shu-Li's demands. When she forces him into cram school, he begins dating Cheng Fang-Lan, who inspires him to pursue art instead of academics. Shu-Li finds out about them and urges Pei-Wei to break up with her, but when he refuses, she uses the remote to erase her memories of him. Pei-Wei's mental health deteriorates, and several years later, his life is still being controlled by Shu-Li even as an adult. While she is away, Pei-Wei breaks into her safe for the remote. As he confronts her, he is hit by a truck.
3–4	"Child of the Cat"; Transliteration: "Māo de Háizĭ" (Chinese: 貓的孩子)	Chien Shih-keng	July 14, 2018
After finding a box of kittens above his unstable parents' apartment, teenager Kuo-Cho Yen finds a terrifying way to cheat on his exams.
5–6	"The Last Day of Molly"; Transliteration: "Mòli de Zuìhòu Yītiān" (Chinese: 茉莉的最後一天)	Hong Ziying	July 21, 2018
When Molly commits suicide, her mother uses technology to relive her experiences and investigate why she died.
7–8	"Peacock"; Transliteration: "Kǒngquè" (Chinese: 孔雀)	Kang-Chen Hsia, Fei Kung-yi, Chien Tai-Mai	July 28, 2018
A student from a modest home goes to an elite private school and makes a life-altering agreement with a talking peacock in the schoolyard.
9–10	"ADHD is Necessary"; Transliteration: "Bixūguò Dòng" (Chinese: 必須過動)	Kang-Chen Hsia, Fei Kung-yi, Chien Tai-Mai	August 4, 2018
In a government-controlled society, women give birth by artificial insemination to produce perfect children that are raised as wealthy elites; however, if their grades drop, they are forced to move to the slums. Yang Chuan, an elite author, hopes to raise her daughter, Nova, as a star pupil much like her late son, Ruo-Jie; however, Nova's grades begin declining. Fearing that she may lose her lifestyle and reputation, Chuan instructs Nova to pretend she has ADHD. Nova later learns from Ling-Na, a rebel, that the students diagnosed with mental disorders are deemed "faulty" and are sent to the advancement program to be executed, while their mothers are allowed to keep their status. She also learns that Ruo-Jie had committed suicide when Chuan refused to support his dreams of being a carpenter. Nova is invited to live with the survivors, but instead she returns home out of guilt for disobeying Chuan. Later that night, Nova is executed at the advancement program after Chuan drugs her dinner. The survivors are also arrested by the government and executed. Chuan then prepares for her third child, in spite of warnings from Ling-Na that the cycle will repeat.

== Release ==
On Children was released on July 7, 2018 on Taiwanese Public Television Service.

== Awards and nominations ==
Year	Ceremony	Category	Nominee	Result
2019	54th Golden Bell Awards	Best Television Film	On Children - Child of the Cat	Won
2019	54th Golden Bell Awards	Best Leading Actress in a Miniseries or Television Film	Ivy Yin (On Children - The Last Day of Molly)	Nominated
2019	54th Golden Bell Awards	Best Leading Actress in a Miniseries or Television Film	Chung Hsin-ling (On Children - Child of the Cat)	Won
2019	54th Golden Bell Awards	Best Supporting Actress in a Miniseries or Television Film	Gingle Wang (On Children - The Last Day of Molly)	Nominated
2019	54th Golden Bell Awards	Best Newcomer in a Miniseries or Television Film	Yuping (On Children - Child of the Cat)	Nominated
2019	54th Golden Bell Awards	Best Newcomer in a Miniseries or Television Film	Wang Yu-xuan (On Children - Peacock)	Nominated
2019	54th Golden Bell Awards	Best Newcomer in a Miniseries or Television Film	Liu Hsiu-fu (On Children - Child of the Cat)	Nominated
2019	54th Golden Bell Awards	Best Director in a Miniseries or Television Film	Chen Wei-ling, Yu Hui-jun (On Children - Child of the Cat)	Won
2019	54th Golden Bell Awards	Best Writing for a Miniseries or Television Film	Shih-keng Chien (On Children - Child of the Cat)	Nominated
2019	54th Golden Bell Awards	Best Cinematography	Jian Zheng-zhuan, Jian Xin-you (On Children - Child of the Cat)	Nominated
2019	54th Golden Bell Awards	Best Film Editing	Wu Zi-ying (On Children - Child of the Cat)	Won
2019	54th Golden Bell Awards	Best Sound Award	Waa Wei, Shi Min-jie, Zheng Yuan-kai (On Children - Mother's Remote)	Nominated
2019	54th Golden Bell Awards	Best Lighting Award	Li Qi-xiang (On Children - Child of the Cat)	Nominated
2019	54th Golden Bell Awards	Best Art and Design Award	Wu Ruo-yun, Huang Ming-ren, Lai Wan-ting, Wang Zhong-zhì, Yao Liang-qi, Lin Jia-ling (On Children - Child of the Cat)	Won
