= The Pig, the Snake and the Pigeon =

2023 Taiwanese film by Wong Ching-po

The Pig, The Snake and The Pigeon
- Theatrical release poster
- Traditional Chinese: 周處除三害
- Directed by: Wong Ching-po
- Screenplay by: Wong Ching-po
- Produced by: Lee Lieh; Roger Huang
- Starring: Ethan Juan; Ben Yuen; Chen Yi-wen; Gingle Wang; Lee Lee-zen; Cherry Hsieh
- Cinematography: Jimmy Wong
- Edited by: Wong Ching-po
- Music by: Luming Lu; Lin Hsiao-Chin; Lin Sih-yu; Baobu Badulu
- Production company: An Attitude Production
- Distributed by: Warner Bros.
- Release date: 6 October 2023
- Running time: 134 minutes
- Country: Taiwan
- Languages: Mandarin; Hokkien; Cantonese
- Budget: NTD$60,000,000

The Pig, The Snake and The Pigeon (Note: The Pig, the Snake, and the Pigeon refers to the three evils in Buddhism, corresponding with ignorance, anger, and greed.) (Chinese: 周處除三害; trans. "Zhou Chu Eradicates the Three Scourges") is a 2023 Taiwanese black comedy action thriller film directed and written by Hong Kong director Wong Ching-po. Starring Ethan Juan, Ben Yuen, Chen Yi-wen, Gingle Wang, Lee Lee-zen, and Cherry Hsieh, the film revolves around a dying and fame-seeking hitman (Juan) who endeavoured to eliminate the country's two most wanted criminals (Yuen and Chen) before his own demise.

The film was theatrically released on 6 October 2023, in Taiwan. It received 7 nominations in the 60th Golden Horse Awards and 13 nominations in the 26th Taipei Film Awards, with Ethan Juan and Lee Lee-zen winning Best Actor and Best Supporting Actor respectively in the latter.

== Plot ==
Chen Kui-lin, a notorious hitman in Taiwan, infiltrates a funeral and shoots down a high-ranking gang boss. Police detective Chen Hui is surveiling the funeral, and spots Kui-lin fleeing the scene. Chen Hui pursues him and the two engage in a fight, but Kui-lin overpowers Chen, causing him to lose an eye. Kui-lin manages to escape unharmed.

Four years later, Dr. Chang, an underworld doctor, approaches the long-hiding Kui-lin and informs him that he has stage IV lung cancer. Motivated by his impending death, Kui-lin decides to turn himself in at a nearby police station. However, the police officers did not recognize him and rudely order him to wait in line. He discovers that he is ranked only third on the country's most-wanted list, behind the renowned criminals "Hongkie" and "Bullhead." Determined to accomplish something significant, Kui-lin resolves to eliminate these two major criminals during the final stage of his life.

Kui-lin's first target is Hongkie, and learns from Dr. Chang that Hongkie was hiding in a hair salon in Taichung. Kui-lin spends the entire night spying on Hongkie from a hotel across the street. He witnesses Hongkie manipulating Hsiao-mei, the salon owner, and forcing her into a sexual relationship. The next morning, Kui-lin attempts to speak with Hsiao-mei but is discovered by Hongkie. Hongkie revealed that he had noticed Kui-lin spying on him all night but had mistaken his intentions, thinking he was interested in Hsiao-mei. Realizing he had been exposed, Kui-lin launches an assault on Hongkie when he attempts to rape Hsiao-mei and kept his subordinates away. However, Hongkie manages to escape Kui-lin's ambush, and the two continue their fight all the way to a deserted warehouse, where Kui-lin deals a fatal blow to Hongkie. Afterwards, he returns to the salon to rescue Hsiao-mei and kill the rest of Hongkie's men. He leaves Hsiao-mei by the sea and instructs her to tell the police that he killed Hongkie.

Kui-lin traces Bullhead to the "New Soul Society," a new religious movement, and travels to the society's commune in Penghu. While attending a lecture by His Holiness, the leader of the society, Kui-lin vomits black liquid and collapses. During his recovery, His Holiness tells him that Bullhead had died many years ago, and shows Kui-lin his grave. Now devoid of purpose, Kui-lin decides to start a new life at the society, in the hopes of spiritually restoring his health. As part of the society's regulations, he gives away all of his money and possessions to be incinerated. He enjoys his new lifestyle, and is soon informed that his cancer has miraculously gone into remission.

However, during another lecture, a young boy visiting the society with his mother also vomits black liquid and is hospitalized. Kui-lin overhears other acolytes discussing poisoning the boy, and witnesses His Holiness manipulate the boy's mother into joining the society. Suspicious, Kui-lin goes to His Holiness's private quarters and discovers a secret trapdoor leading to a lavish apartment, along with a room filled with the confiscated possessions of the society's members. He confronts His Holiness during the initiation ceremony for the boy's mother, but she commits suicide. Kui-lin is subdued, stabbed, and buried alive by the cultists.

Kui-lin manages to escape from his coffin. He finds and excavates Bullhead's grave, only to find that it is empty except for a single photograph of Bullhead and his mother, revealing that "His Holiness" is Bullhead. He digs up the gun he had buried earlier and returns to the commune. After exposing His Holiness's identity and past to the cult members, Kui-lin kills him. However, the rest of the cult rallies behind His Holiness's second-in-command. Enraged, Kui-lin returns and tells the cultists to leave. Several people escape, and Kui-lin shoots all cultists choosing to stay one by one. Having completed his mission, Kui-lin turns himself in to Chen Hui, and is subsequently arrested.

Dr. Chang visits him in prison and reveals that she is dying of lung cancer, as the cancerous X-ray she showed Kui-lin was actually hers. She had lied to convince Kui-lin to end his violent career, unaware of how things would turn out. She remarks that Kui-lin is famous with his newfound reputation. Kui-lin thanks her and states he is now at peace. Chen Hui invites Hsiao-mei to the prison to shave Kui-lin's beard one last time. Kui-lin receives the death penalty and is executed by firearm.

== Cast ==
- Ethan Juan as Chen "The Kuilin Kid" Kui-lin, a notorious hitman who intends to hunt down the two most wanted criminals of the country before he dies from lung cancer
- Ben Yuen as Hsu "Hongkie" Wei-chiang, the No.2 most wanted criminal and a Cantonese-speaking brute originating from Hong Kong
- Chen Yi-wen as Lin "Bullhead" Lu-ho / Your Holiness, the No.1 most wanted criminal and a mass murderer who reinvents himself as a cult leader
- Gingle Wang as Cheng Hsiao-mei, a young hair salon owner who is coerced into a relationship with Hongkie
- Lee Lee-zen as Chen Hui, a detective who determines to hunt down Chen Kui-lin
- Cherry Hsieh as Dr. Chang Kuei-ching, an underworld doctor and an acquaintance of Chen Kui-lin

Also appearing in the film are Troy Liu as Goldie, a young gangster who idolizes Chen Kui-lin; Peggy Tseng as Hsiao Hsiang-hsiang, Bullhead's mistress and second-in-command; Huang Di-yang as Brother B, a loyal acolyte of Your Holiness; and Yu An-shun as a deceased man whose identity was stolen by Bullhead. Hong Kong actors Benjamin Tsang and Ben Cheung appear as the sidekicks of Hongkie. Cheng Yu-Chieh cameos as Dr. Chao, a medical doctor who cooperates with Bullhead to lure new acolytes.

== Production ==
=== Development ===
In 2011, Hong Kong director Wong Ching-po came up with the story concept for The Pig, the Snake, and the Pigeon, originally envisioning it as a road movie set in Hong Kong, Japan, and Korea, with different characters and locations compared to the final version set in Taipei, Taichung, and Penghu. Despite pitching the screenplay idea to various producers, production did not finalize. After producing Once Upon a Time in Shanghai in 2014, Wong found himself lacking fresh filming ideas centered around Hong Kong, leading him to relocate and join productions in Taiwan. In 2019, through a mutual friend, Wong met Taiwanese producer Lee Lieh and presented three story concepts to her. Among them, Lee became intrigued by the idea that eventually evolved into The Pig, the Snake, and the Pigeon. Wong finalized the screenplay draft in August 2020, initially titled Crime and Punishment. The story was later retitled as The Pig, the Snake, and the Pigeon, with reference to the Chinese historical figure Zhou Chu. The film received funding from the Taichung Film Development Foundation in 2022, as filming primarily took place in Taichung, while post-production was completed in Taipei. The film rights were sold at the European Film Market in Berlin in February 2023, and an official trailer was released in August 2023.

=== Casting ===
In November 2022, Ethan Juan and Gingle Wang were cast in lead roles, while the remaining cast members and film details were kept under wraps. In February 2023, Ben Yuen and Chen Yi-wen were added to the cast. Lee Lee-zen, Cherry Hsieh, Peggy Tseng and Yu An-shun were later revealed to be part of the cast through the official trailer released in August 2023.

Wong Ching-po created the character Chen Kui-lin, drawing inspiration from real-life gangster Liu Huanrong. He specifically selected Ethan Juan to portray the role, considering his similar vibe and charisma as demonstrated in the 2010 film Monga. Lee Lieh, the film's producer who had a strained relationship with Juan due to his early departure at the 50th Golden Horse Awards ceremony, was responsible for reaching out to Juan, and the two were able to reconcile during the production of the film.

=== Filming ===
Principal photography occurred during the summer of 2022, primarily in Taichung, with Lyu-Chuan Canal and Jingming Commercial District being among the locations used. The film crew rented an empty shop on Jingming 1st Street for NTD$150,000 and renovated it into the set of Hsiao-mei's hair salon. Filming also took place aboard the retired cruise ship Tai Hwa, and concluded prior to November 2022.

== Release ==
The Pig, The Snake and The Pigeon was theatrically released on 6 October 2023, in Taiwan. The film was also made available on the streaming service Netflix later on 1 March 2024.

== Reception ==
=== Box office ===
The Pig, the Snake and the Pigeon raked in over NTD$16,000,000 during its first weekend of release and went on to become the top-grossing local production in Taiwan, with a total gross of NTD$47,000,000. Upon its release in March 2024, it quickly rose to the top of the box office in Mainland China, grossing approximately RMB$417,000,000 (NTD$1,820,000,000) by the first weekend.

=== Critical response ===
James Marsh of South China Morning Post gave the film 3/5 stars and acknowledged the film's enegertic vibes and sympathetic portrayal of its protagonist, but suggested that it may not be universally entertaining as the plot is perplexing and characters like Hsiao-mei and Chen Hui are underdeveloped. Han Cheung of Taipei Times appreciated the film for its compelling character study, particularly Ethan Juan's performance, and the intriguing approach to the gangster genre which avoided excessive reliance on action scenes. However, Cheung also pointed out flaws such as underdeveloped supporting characters and scenes that lack believability. Tay Yek Keak, writing for TODAY, gave the film 3.5/5 stars and lauded its endeavor to blend realism with absurdity and violence with tranquillity, as well as the portrayal of Ethan Juan as the intriguing anti-hero, but noted that the two halves of the film were in stark contrast and did not integrate well. John Lui of The Straits Times, offering a rather negative review, criticized the messy narrative, abrupt tonal shifts, and the absence of stylish visuals that could have complemented the film's dark themes. However, he did recognize the film's exploration of morality and nihilism as a positive aspect.

== Awards and nominations ==
Year	Award	Category	Nominee	Result	Ref.
2023	60th Golden Horse Awards	Best Director	Wong Ching-po	Nominated	
2023	60th Golden Horse Awards	Best Film Editing	Wong Ching-po	Nominated	
2023	60th Golden Horse Awards	Best Actor	Ethan Juan	Nominated	
2023	60th Golden Horse Awards	Best Visual Effects	Tomi Kuo, Hulk Chen and Gareth Wang	Nominated	
2023	60th Golden Horse Awards	Best Sound Effects	Book Chien, Chen Jia-li, Yang Jia-shen and Tang Hsiang-chu	Nominated	
2023	60th Golden Horse Awards	Best Action Choreography	Scott Hung	Won	
2023	60th Golden Horse Awards	Best Original Film Score	Luming Lu, Lin Hsiao-chin, Lin Sih-yu and Baobu Badulu	Nominated	
2024	5th Taiwan Film Critics Society Awards	Best Film	—N/a	Nominated	
2024	5th Taiwan Film Critics Society Awards	Best Screenplay	Wong Ching-po	Nominated	
2024	5th Taiwan Film Critics Society Awards	Best Actor	Ethan Juan	Won	
2024	42nd Hong Kong Film Awards	Best Asian Chinese Language Film	—N/a	Won	
2024	26th Taipei Film Awards	Best Narrative Feature	—N/a	Nominated	
2024	26th Taipei Film Awards	Best Director	Wong Ching-po	Nominated	
2024	26th Taipei Film Awards	Best Screenplay	Wong Ching-po	Nominated	
2024	26th Taipei Film Awards	Best Actor	Ethan Juan	Won	
2024	26th Taipei Film Awards	Best Supporting Actor	Lee Lee-zen	Won	
2024	26th Taipei Film Awards	Best Supporting Actress	Peggy Tseng	Nominated	
2024	26th Taipei Film Awards	Best Cinematography	Jimmy Wong	Nominated	
2024	26th Taipei Film Awards	Best Music	Luming Lu, Lin Hsiao-chin, Lin Sih-yu and Baobu Badulu	Nominated	
2024	26th Taipei Film Awards	Best Art Direction	Liang Shuo-lin	Nominated	
2024	26th Taipei Film Awards	Best Costume	Hsu Li-wen	Nominated	
2024	26th Taipei Film Awards	Best Sound Design	Book Chien, Chen Jia-li, Yang Jia-shen and Tang Hsiang-chu	Nominated	
2024	26th Taipei Film Awards	Best Visual Effects	Tomi Kuo, Hulk Chen and Gareth Wang	Nominated	
2024	26th Taipei Film Awards	Outstanding Artistic Contribution	Scott Hung	Nominated	
