= Pierce (film) =

2024 film by Nelicia Low

- Promotional poster
- Traditional Chinese: 刺心切骨
- Hanyu Pinyin: Cì xīn qiè gŭ
- Directed by: Nelicia Low
- Written by: Nelicia Low
- Produced by: Sam Chua Weishi; Jeremy Chua; Patrick Mao Huang; Izabela Igel; John M. Lo
- Starring: Liu Hsiu-fu; Tsao Yu-ning; Ding Ning; Lin Tsu-heng; Rosen Tsai
- Cinematography: Michał Dymek
- Edited by: Nelicia Low; Eric Mendelsohn
- Music by: Piotr Kurek
- Production companies: Harine Films; Fixafilm; Potocol; Flash Forward Entertainment; Elysiüm Ciné
- Distributed by: Pilot Film
- Release dates: 3 July 2024 (KVIFF); 7 November 2024 (Singapore)
- Running time: 109 minutes
- Countries: Singapore; Taiwan; Poland
- Language: Mandarin

Pierce (Chinese: 刺心切骨) is a 2024 psychological thriller film directed by Nelicia Low, in her debut feature. It delves into themes of sibling bonds and the ideals that are projected onto loved ones. The Singapore-Taiwan-Poland co-production film had its premiere at the 58th Karlovy Vary International Film Festival, where it received the Best Director Award.

The film had its world premiere at the 58th Karlovy Vary International Film Festival on 3 July 2024, followed by a theatrical release in Singapore on 7 November.

== Synopsis ==
The film follows the tale of a high school fencer, Jie, who decides to trust and assist his dangerous older brother, Han, after his release from prison, defying their mother's efforts to conceal their traumatic past.

== Cast ==
- Liu Hsiu-fu as Wen Zi Jie
- Tsao Yu-ning as Wen Zi Han
- Ding Ning as Tang Ai Ling, a glamorous widow and nightclub singer
- Lin Tsu-heng as Zhuang, boyfriend of Ling
- Rosen Tsai as Jing Hui, gay interest of Jie
- Yeh Hong-Yi as Young Jie
- Chang En-Wei as Young Han

== Production ==
=== Development ===
In 2014, Nelicia Low, a former competitive fencer from Singapore, conceived the story while producing her first short film in Taiwan. She was inspired by the 2014 Taipei Metro attack, in which the attacker Cheng Chieh's younger brother blindly supported him and believed he was innocent. The attacker's younger brother's blind love and support of him resonated with Low, whose brother is autistic. Describing the project as "semi-autobiographical", Low began writing the screenplay in 2015, drawing inspiration from her personal relationships and experiences, and created a sibling relationship with parallels to her and her brother. To develop the story, she researched American serial killers by watching documentaries, including those about Ted Bundy. Low also incorporated LGBT elements into her story, crediting them with reflecting Taiwan's progressiveness in the context of legalized gay marriage.

After five years of writing, she completed the screenplay for Pierce during the Full Circle Lab in the Philippines and Talents Tokyo in 2020, where it received a special mention in the latter. During the workshops, Low met a Polish producer who expressed interest in the project. She envisioned having a non-Asian cinematographer to provide a unique perspective for the film, prompting her to reach out to Polish cinematographers and select Michał Dymek from 30 candidates that same year. Pre-production also took five years, with two years based in Taiwan. Ding Ning, Tsao Yu-ning, and Liu Hsiu-fu joined the cast in September 2021, coinciding with the film's presentation at the Focus Asia All Genres Project Market. The project was jointly produced by Singapore's Potocol, Taiwan's Flash Forward Entertainment, and Poland's Harine Films, with funding from Singapore's Infocomm Media Development Authority, Taiwan Creative Content Agency, and the Polish Film Institute. To prepare for their roles as competitive fencers, Tsao and Liu underwent nine months of fencing training.

=== Filming and post-production ===
Principal photography began in Taipei, Taiwan on 14 January 2022. The film is cinematographed by Michał Dymek, and shot in a precise 1:66:1 aspect ratio. The crew approached more than ten schools during location scouting but was unable to secure loans due to the COVID-19 pandemic, leading them to construct a production set for the school scenes. Filming moved to Taichung on 7 February, supported by funding from the Taichung City Government. Location shooting resumed in Taipei on 14 February. Additional shooting took place in Taoyuan City and Yangmingshan, wrapping up in late February with an expected one-year post-production period. The same month, the film was presented at the European Film Market. In May 2024, Magnify, the international sales arm of Magnolia Pictures acquired the sales rights.

== Release ==
Pierce premiered at the 58th Karlovy Vary International Film Festival on 3 July 2024. It was selected in Taiwan Transcendent section at the 23rd New York Asian Film Festival and had its North American premiere on 13 July 2024. It was showcased at the 2024 Atlantic International Film Festival on 16 September 2024 in Narrative New Waves section, and on 21 September at the Helsinki International Film Festival The film was also invited at the 29th Busan International Film Festival in 'A Window on Asian Cinema' section and was screened on 6 October 2024. Later in the same month it was screened at the 19th Rome Film Festival in Free Style section. On 9 November it was screened at the Hong Kong Asian Film Festival in 'New Talent Award' section. In November, it competed for the Golden Peacock Award at the 55th International Film Festival of India in International competition section and was screened on 25 November.

The film was theatrically released in Singapore on 7 November 2024.

== Reception ==
John Berra reviewing for Screen Daily at Karlovy Vary International Film Festival called Pierce a "sophisticated genre piece" through "narratively fleet yet psychologically layered screenplay from [Nelicia] Low". Vladan Petkovic of Cineuropa praised Low and wrote that "[i]n her psychological thriller, Nelicia Low showcases admirable control of cinematic language and storytelling."

Jessica Kiang giving positive review for Variety wrote that although it has "certain obvious narrative mechanics employed to produce the requisite suspense", "Pierce is clad in such elegant filmmaking that we mostly cannot see the gears grind". John Lui of The Straits Times gave the film 4/5 stars and commended its "complex dynamics of sibling relationships" that use fencing as both a "setting and metaphor" to "[show] how family, more than anyone else, cut the deepest wounds".

== Accolades ==
Award	Date	Category	Recipient	Result	Ref.
Karlovy Vary International Film Festival	6 July 2024	Crystal Globe: Best Director	Nelicia Low	Won	
La Roche-sur-Yon International Film Festival	20 October 2024	Grand Jury Prize	Pierce	Won	
QCinema International Film Festival	13 November 2024	Artistic Achievement Award for Production Design	Marcus Cheng and Hsu Kuei-Ting	Won	
International Film Festival of India	28 November 2024	Golden Peacock	Pierce	Nominated	
