= Chen Yu (actress) =

Taiwanese actress

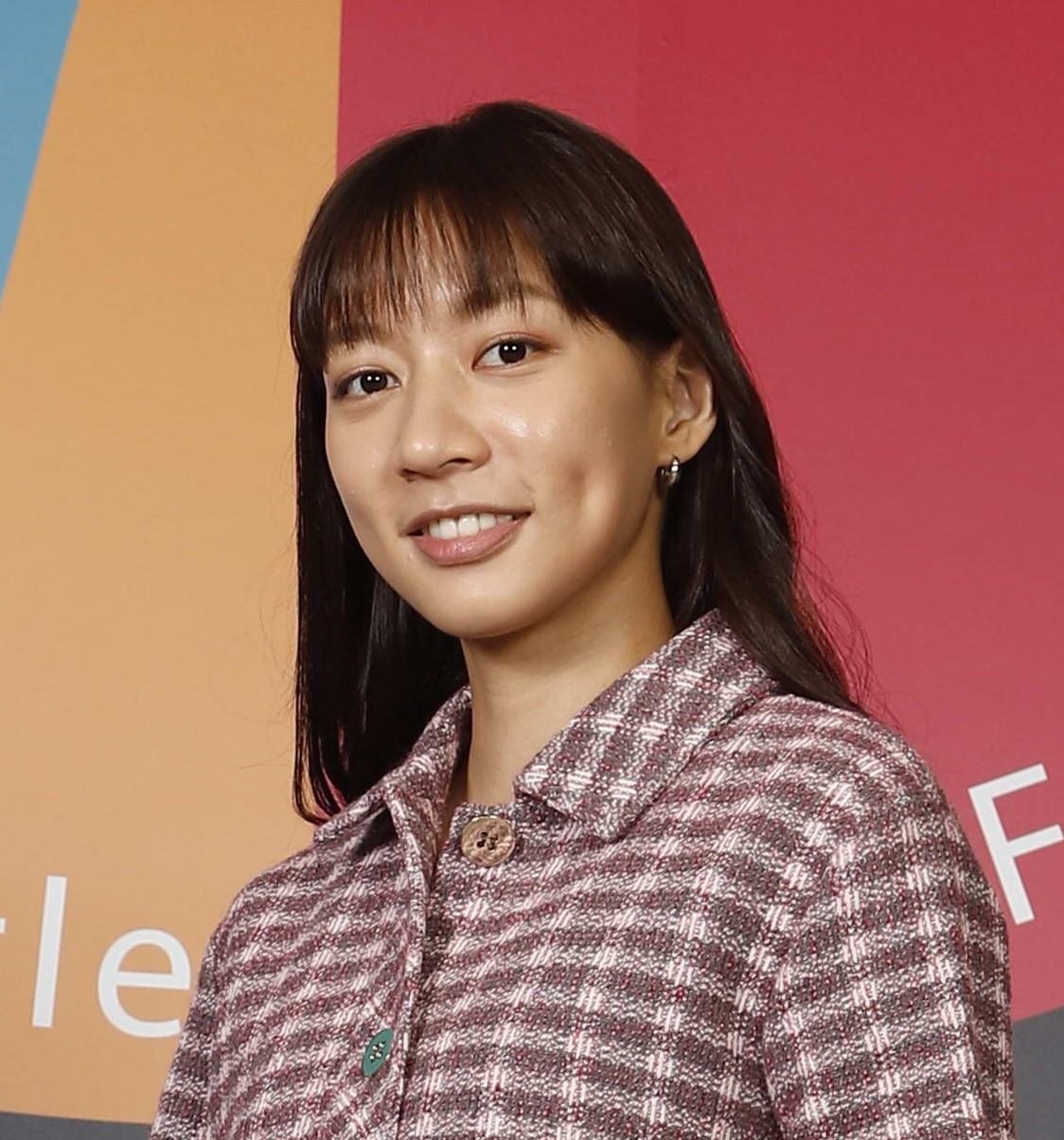
Chen in 2023

Chen Yu (Chinese: 陳妤; pinyin: Chén Yú; born 7 May 1994) is a Taiwanese actress. After graduating from Chinese Culture University, Chen gained her reputation across various films and television productions from several genres, and made her screen debut with the television series Love of Sandstorm in 2016, and her film career began with the movie Back to the Good Times. She went on to star in several commercially successful series and films, including the series The World Between Us (2019) and the film Do You Love Me As I Love You (2020).

== Early life ==
Chen Yu was born on 7 May 1994, in Taiwan, into a family of five. Her father is an audio recording engineer, her mother is a voice actress, and she has two older brothers. She graduated from the Department of Theater Arts at Chinese Culture University. Chen Yu has been involved in performing since childhood, participating in cartoon voice acting. During high school, she was active in school events and activities, taking advantage of the opportunity of performing in the private school she attended. "At school with such strict rules, joining in practicing dancing and rehearsing is the time to 'take a breath'." She said in an interview with Flipped Education that she enjoyed participating in group works and performing on the stage.

However, Chen Yu did not think of becoming an actress before getting into college. In fact, she had decided to study biology or chemistry due to her academic performance in those subjects. When applying for colleges, Chen Yu put Department of Theater Arts as her last choice on the list only because her mother graduated from the department. Walking on the acting path out of coincidence, Chen Yu met her abecedarian, Yen Ling Hsu, just after getting into college. Professor Hsu not only enlightened her in performing but also impacted her sense of values.

Being brought up by a domestic worker in the family, Chen Yu initially had a difficult relationship with her parents. Chen Yu had been raised like a boy, like her two brothers. She thought "Between working and taking care of children, my parents chose the former." After growing up, Chen Yu gradually reconciled with her parents. She started to consider her mother as an advice-giver, and her father as a problem-solver. Chen Yu has been deeply influenced by her family. Chen Yu shared her father’s words in her interview: "Life is like a sponge. You need to learn as long as you can because you don’t know when things will come in handy."

== Acting career ==
=== 2014–2016 ===
In 2014, Chen Yu was studying in the department of Drama and Theatre at Chinese Culture University and started to participate in stage shows. In 2015, she became a trainee in the acting training of QPlace, furthermore, the training after being selected helped Chen Yu truly realize her true calling as an actress.

=== 2016–2018 ===
In 2016, Chen Yu made her debut as an actress, and her casting began for Love of Sandstorm filmed by Qseries. In her personal interview, she revealed that the most challenging thing for her was to perform crying. When she read the script, she thought she could cry; however, she could not cry when acting. In 2017, she got the Golden Bell Award for Best New Performer in a Television Series and a nominee for the Golden Bell Award for Best Supporting Actress in a Television Series by Love of Sandstorm. In the same year, she also participated in House of Toy Bricks and What She Put on the Table produced by Qseries. She was one of the guest actors in Lion Pride. Displaying Befriend and Utopia For The 20s, she was the supporting actress in both dramas in 2018.

=== 2019–2023 ===
In 2019, Chen Yu starred in The World Between Us. Her acting skills were recognized by the audience and critics. This TV series stimulated public discussion about indiscriminate killing and the dilemma of the news media. It received outstanding ratings. When Chen Yu acted in The World Between Us, she liked her role very much, and the role she played was vivid for her. However, Chen Yu was too concerned about gain and loss and too eager to be good, so she thought she didn’t perform that well. After that, she could adjust her mentality better. In the same year, she also starred in Taiwanese idol dreams Déjà vu and Before We Get Married.

In 2020, Chen Yu first starred as a leading actress in the movie Do You Love Me As I Love You. Although it is never easy to be the lead actress, she still regained her cheerfulness in filming. Compared to her participation in The World Between Us, she showed a completely different charm when filming Do You Love Me As I Love You. From her initial fright to her present familiarity, she thinks she has fumbled through her acting experience over the years. Furthermore, more people know about Chen Yu through this work. Chen Yu also acted in the Taiwanese television drama Cometesting and the Political television series Island Nation.

In the series More Than Blue, Chen Yu acted as the special guest star, Chen Xian-an. This tearjerker caused a sensation by the careful production and its reputation. She acted as a supporting actress in a Taiwanese romantic fantasy comedy movie Till We Meet Again in 2021.

In 2022, Chen Yu thought that she had always been recorded as her characters but rarely recorded as Chen Yu, so she attended All Star Sports today. It was her first time attending a game show, which was quite different from being an actress. She had to join physical training for up to six months and endure the impact of an injury on her work schedule. Not only attending the game show, she also acted in Golden Dream On Green Island produced by Qseries 2 as a special starring in the same year.

In 2023, Chen Yu starred as the leading actress in three types of dramas: the movie Mystery Writers, the TV series Could I have your LINE, daughter? and the television film Space Boy.

== Work ==
=== Love of Sandstorm (2016) ===
The romantic comedy series Love of Sandstorm centers around the Lin family's journey to navigate their complex family dynamics, learn from their love experiences, and mature in the process. In the series, Yu played the role of Yi-Shan Lin, the eldest daughter in the Lin family, who grappled with a love triangle and the difficult decision of whether to give in to her romantic interest or not.

=== The World Between Us (2019) ===
The Taiwanese television drama series, The World Between Us, falls under the genre of drama and crime. It garnered a significant following in Taiwan, with its final episode earning a television rating of 3.4. The series received 24 award nominations, with 10 of them resulting in wins. The show incorporated elements from various domains, such as news, laws, medical care, and social welfare. It was the first Taiwanese TV series to explore random killing and address sensitive topics like media controversy and schizophrenia. The series raised social issues like how the public should treat the perpetrator's family and the line between good and evil. The playwright, Shih-yuan Lu, wrote the script out of fear of random killings. The show resonated with many viewers who found it emotionally impactful. In the series, Yu played the character of Li, Ta-Chih, the sister of the perpetrator. Li, Ta-Chih, faced public scrutiny and criticism for her association with her brother's actions. She learned to navigate through this challenging situation with her family and cope with the negative attention. Chen Yu received a nomination for the Huading Awards for Best Supporting Actress in a Television Series for her role in this series.

=== Do You Love Me As I Love You (2020) ===
Do You Love Me As I Love You is classified as a teen movie and depicts the complex relationships between teenagers and the rollercoaster of emotions that comes with love. The film received three nominations at the Taipei Film Awards and was a commercial success, earning over 20 million NTD within three days of its release. In the movie, Yu played the role of Tien, Xiao-Xiang, the protagonist who harbored unrequited feelings for Li, Zhu-Hao for a significant period. However, Li, Zhu-Hao confessed his love for Tien's best friend, Song Yi-Jing, which led Tien, Xiao-Xiang to confront the issue of a love triangle.

== Personal life ==
=== Relationships ===
Chen Yu publicly came out as bisexual in 2019’s ETtoday interview. She revealed that she had once dated a woman for two years while they were both studying at Chinese Culture University. Chen Yu stated that she does not consider sexual orientation as a factor in relationships and feels comfortable with her gender identity. However, she acknowledged that it took a lot of time and discussions with her parents, and she believes that there is still much education and discussion needed in the future. Throughout the interview, she emphasized that her personal life is private and that she hopes people will focus more on her work.

In 2021's Liberty Times Net interview, Chen Yu mentioned that she was dating a chef who was four years older than her. They have been dating each other since 2016.

=== Personal hobbies ===
Chen Yu stated that she loves to engage in outdoor activities in 2019's Ms. Ocean interview. During the interview, she shared the outdoor activities she had learned so far. She expressed a preference for sports that require technical problem-solving skills, stating that she finds the challenge exhilarating. Among her hobbies are swimming, skateboarding, bouldering, and freediving, which she particularly enjoys.

In 2019, Chen Yu was chosen as a charity ambassador for Zenan Homeless Social Welfare Foundation. The events she participated in were mainly for those in need. As a charity ambassador, Chen Yu called for improvements to the lives of those in need. She also promoted the charity events held by Zenan Homeless Social Welfare Foundation by filming a short clip on its official YouTube channel.
