= Nelicia Low =

Singaporean film director

- Born: Singapore
- Education: Columbia University School of the Arts
- Occupation: Film director
- Years active: 2016−present

Chinese name
- Traditional Chinese: 劉慧伶
- Simplified Chinese: 刘慧伶
- Hanyu Pinyin: Liu Huiling

Nelicia Low (Chinese: 刘慧伶) is a Singaporean film director and former national fencer.

== Education ==
Low studied at Raffles Girls' School and then studied media and communications in university. She also did a summer programme at the New York University Tisch School of the Arts and then Master of Fine Arts in film directing at Columbia University in New York City.

== Career ==
Low represented Singapore in fencing at the 2010 Asian Games. After retiring from fencing, Low earned her MFA in Film Directing from Columbia University School of the Arts and created several short films, including Freeze (2016), which was screened at several festivals such as the 38th Clermont-Ferrand International Short Film Festival, the 53rd Taipei Golden Horse Film Festival and the 33rd Busan International Short Film Festival.

Her 2024 debut feature film Pierce, a Singapore-Taiwan-Poland co-production, received the Best Director Award at the 58th Karlovy Vary International Film Festival. The psychological thriller delves into themes of familial bonds, following the tale of a high school fencer, who decides to trust and assist his dangerous older brother after his release from prison, defying their mother's efforts to conceal their traumatic past.

== Filmography ==
Year	Title	Notes	Ref
2014	Freak	Short film	
2016	Freeze	Short film	
2024	Pierce	Feature film	

== Accolades ==
Award	Date	Category	Work	Result	Ref.
Karlovy Vary International Film Festival	6 July 2024	Crystal Globe: Best Director	Pierce	Won	
