= Ding Ning (actress) =

Taiwanese actress

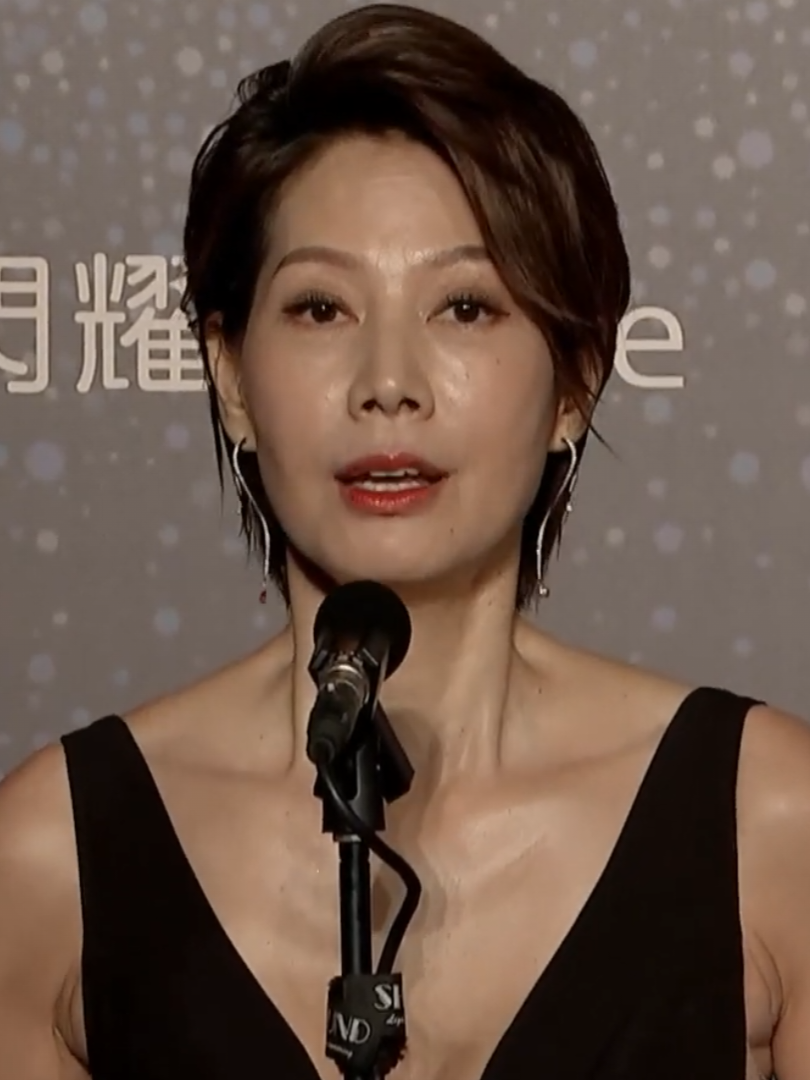
- Ding in 2023
- Born: Lee Pei-Ling; 4 July 1970 (age 55); Erlin, Changhua County, Taiwan
- Education: National Taiwan University of Sport
- Occupation: Actress
- Years active: 1987–present
- Spouse: Matthew Garcia Maliglig (m. 2010)
- Children: 3

Chinese name
- Traditional Chinese: 丁寧
- Simplified Chinese: 丁宁
Transcriptions
Standard Mandarin
- Hanyu Pinyin: Dīng Níng

Birth name
- Chinese: 李佩玲
Transcriptions
Standard Mandarin
- Hanyu Pinyin: Lǐ Pèilíng

Ding Ning (born Lee Pei-Ling, 1970) is a Taiwanese actress. She won critical acclaim and a Golden Horse Award for her supporting role in the film Cities of Last Things (2018). She was also nominated for a Taipei Film Award and an Asian Film Award for the role.

Her more recent films include Pierce (2024) and the romantic drama Terrorizers (2021). She also starred in the Netflix crime drama series Shards of Her (2022).

== Selected filmography ==
- Once Upon a Time in Triad Society (1996)
- Mars (2004)
- The Hospital (2006)
- Girlfriend, Boyfriend (2012)
- Love By Design (2016)
- Packages from Daddy (2016)
- Cities of Last Things (2018)
