= Troy Liu =

Taiwanese actor (born 2003)

- 劉子銓
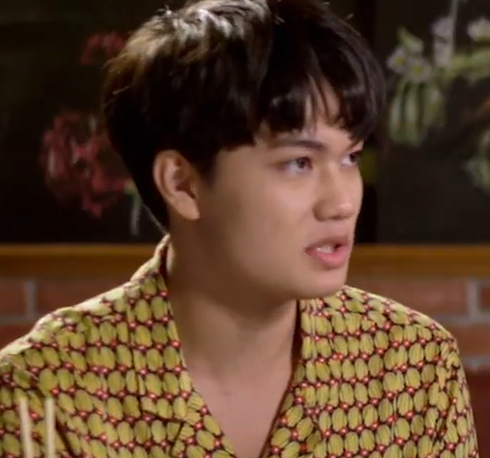
- Liu in November 2020
- Born: Liu Tzu-chuan; 30 January 2003 (age 23); Taiwan
- Education: Taipei University of Marine Technology
- Occupation: Actor
- Years active: 2018–present
- Family: Renzo Liu; Chen Jin

Troy Liu Tzu-chuan (Chinese: 劉子銓; born 30 January 2003) is a Taiwanese actor best known for starring in the drama film The Silent Forest (2020), which earned him an IFFI Best Actor Award in the 51st International Film Festival of India.

== Biography ==
Liu was born on 30 January 2003. He is the son of Taiwanese actor Renzo Liu and actress Chen Jin. Liu wasn't interested in acting when he was young. However, film director Chen Wei-ling, a friend of Renzo Liu, discovered his talents and encouraged Liu to participate in school dramas. After several performances in junior high school, Liu became fond of acting and Chen invited him to star in her television series On Children in 2018 when Liu was 14. In 2020, Liu auditioned and won his breakout role as Chang Chen in the drama film The Silent Forest, a hearing-impaired student at a special school who discovered a fellow female student being gang-raped and sexually harassed by the school bullies. Liu won an IFFI Best Actor Award (Male) in the 51st International Film Festival of India, and was nominated for Best New Talent in the 23rd Taipei Film Awards with the role. Liu took a hiatus from acting in 2021 and attended Taipei University of Marine Technology to study fashion styling design and management.

== Filmography ==
=== Film ===
Year	Title	Role	Notes/Ref.
2020	The Silent Forest	Chang Chen (張誠)	
2023	Antikalpa	Fatty (小胖)	
2023	The Pig, the Snake and the Pigeon	Goldie (金毛)	

=== Television ===
Year	Title	Role	Notes/Ref.
2018	On Children	Chi Pei-wei (紀培偉)	Main role
2020	76 Horror Bookstore	Wang Xiao-hua (王少華)	Main role
2024	The Victims' Game	Young Lin Min-cheng (林明誠)	Recurring role (season 2)

== Awards and nominations ==
Year	Award	Category	Work	Result	Ref.
2021	51st International Film Festival of India	IFFI Best Actor Award (Male)	The Silent Forest	Won	
2021	23rd Taipei Film Awards	Best New Talent	The Silent Forest	Nominated	
