= 54th Golden Bell Awards =

- Date: October 5, 2019; 17:00 NST (red carpet); 19:00 NST (awards ceremony)
- Site: Sun Yat-sen Memorial Hall, Taipei, Taiwan
- Hosted by: Mickey Huang
- Preshow hosts: Huang Hao-ping; Mary Wu
- Organized by: Bureau of Audiovisual and Music Industry Development

Television coverage
- Network: Sanlih E-Television; Public Television Service

The 54th Golden Bell Awards (Chinese: 第54屆金鐘獎; pinyin: Dì 54 jiè jīn zhōng jiǎng) was held on October 5, 2019 at the Sun Yat-sen Memorial Hall in Taipei, Taiwan. The ceremony was televised by Sanlih E-Television and Public Television Service. Mickey Huang was the host for the night. Veteran host Chang Hsiao-yen was named the recipient of the Lifetime Achievement Award.

== Winners and nominees ==
Below is the list of winners and nominees for the main categories.

Best Television Series: The World Between Us	Best Miniseries: The Coming Through (奇蹟的女兒)
Best Television Film: On Children - Child of the Cat	Best Variety Show: Jungle Voice (聲林之王)
Best Reality or Game Show: 100 Calls (一呼百應)	
Best Leading Actor in a Television Series: Lung Shao-hua — A Taste to Remember (菜頭梗的滋味)	Best Leading Actress in a Television Series: Alyssa Chia — The World Between Us
Best Supporting Actor in a Television Series: James Wen — The World Between Us	Best Supporting Actress in a Television Series: Pets Tseng — The World Between Us
Best Newcomer in a Television Series: Liang Shu-han — Girl's Power (女兵日記)	
Best Leading Actor in a Miniseries or Television Film: Wu Pong-fong — The Roar (公視人生劇展－第一響槍)	Best Leading Actress in a Miniseries or Television Film: Chung Hsin-ling — On Children - Child of the Cat
Best Supporting Actor in a Miniseries or Television Film: Brando Huang — The Coming Through (奇蹟的女兒)	Best Supporting Actress in a Miniseries or Television Film: Lu Yi-ching — 3 Days 2 Nights (公視人生劇展－3天2夜)
Best Newcomer in a Miniseries or Television Film: Liang Hsiang-hua — Phong Canh Dep Nhat (公視人生劇展－最美的風景)	
Best Host for a Variety Show: Mickey Huang and Pu Hsueh-liang — Super Reunion (超級同學會)	Best Host for a Reality or Game Show: Mickey Huang and Sandy Wu — 100 Calls (一呼百應)
Lifetime Achievement Award: Chang Hsiao-yen	
