= JC Lin =

Taiwanese actor (born 1991)

J.C. Lin (Chinese: 林哲熹; born December 16, 1991) is a Taiwanese actor. Lin graduated from the Department of Theatre Arts, Taipei National University of the Arts (國立臺北藝術大學).

Lin started his career by playing the leading role in a short film The Day to Choose (審判) In 2016. In June 2018, he took part for the first time in the mini-series The Coming Through (奇蹟的女兒), playing the role of Hsieh Min Cheng, a rural youth. In March 2019, he appeared for the first time in the TV series The World Between Us (我們與惡的距離), in which he played the role of Ying Szu-Tsung, a schizophrenia patient. His portrayal was nominated for the 54th Golden Bell Award for Best Supporting Actor under the category of Miniseries or Television Film.

In 2020, he participated in the movie The Bridge Curse (女鬼橋) directed by Lester Shih. In which, he played the role of Ah Chuan. The Bridge Curse was a box office success and it made Lin a well-known actor in the film industry. In July 2023, he starred in the PTS drama What the Hell Is Love (地獄里長), in which he played the role of the head of a village, Lou I-fang, who has superpower and can see ghosts.

In 2024, Lin starred in the movie La réparation (2025) co-produced by Taiwan and France, directed by Régis Wargnier.
