= 50th Golden Horse Awards =

Award ceremony for Chinese-language films of 2012 and 2013

- Promotional poster
- Date: November 23, 2013
- Site: Sun Yat-sen Memorial Hall, Taipei, Taiwan
- Hosted by: Kevin Tsai
- Preshow hosts: Yang Chien-pei; Mickey Huang
- Organized by: Taipei Golden Horse Film Festival Executive Committee

Highlights
- Best Feature Film: Ilo Ilo
- Best Director: Tsai Ming-liang; Stray Dogs
- Best Actor: Lee Kang-sheng; Stray Dogs
- Best Actress: Zhang Ziyi; The Grandmaster
- Most awards: The Grandmaster (5)
- Most nominations: The Grandmaster (11)

Television in Taiwan
- Channel: TTV

The 50th Golden Horse Awards (Mandarin:第50屆金馬獎) took place on November 23, 2013 at the Sun Yat-sen Memorial Hall in Taipei, Taiwan.

== Winners and nominees ==
Winners are listed first and highlighted in boldface.

**Best Feature Film**: **Ilo Ilo**; A Touch of Sin; The Grandmaster; Stray Dogs; Drug War	**Best Documentary**: **Beyond Beauty: Taiwan from Above**; Bridge over Troubled Water; Pusu Qhuni; Boundary Revelation
**Best Short Film**: **Butter Lamp**; Downstream; The Busy Young Psychic; A Breath from the Bottom	**Best Animation Feature** -
**Best Director**: **Tsai Ming-liang — Stray Dogs**; Chung Mong-hong — Soul; Jia Zhangke — A Touch of Sin; Wong Kar-wai — The Grandmaster; Johnnie To — Drug War	**Best New Director**: **Anthony Chen — Ilo Ilo**; Zhao Wei — So Young; Sunny Luk and Longman Leung — Cold War; Juno Mak — Rigor Mortis; Hsu Chao-jen — Together
**Best Leading Actor**: **Lee Kang-sheng — Stray Dogs**; Jimmy Wang Yu — Soul; Tony Leung Chiu-wai — The Grandmaster; Nick Cheung — Unbeatable; Tony Leung Ka-fai — Cold War	**Best Leading Actress**: **Zhang Ziyi — The Grandmaster**; Cherry Ngan — The Way We Dance; Gwei Lun-mei — Christmas Rose; Shu Qi — Journey to the West: Conquering the Demons; Sammi Cheng — Blind Detective
**Best Supporting Actor**: **Li Xuejian — Back to 1942**; Chen Tianwen — Ilo Ilo; Eddie Peng — Unbeatable; Huang Bo — Journey to the West: Conquering the Demons; Tong Dawei — American Dreams in China	**Best Supporting Actress**: **Yeo Yann Yann — Ilo Ilo**; Crystal Lee — Unbeatable; Siu Yam-yam — Tales from the Dark 1; Lin Mei-hsiu — To My Dear Granny; Xue Hong — Longing for the Rain
**Best New Performer**: **Kuo Shu-yao — Step Back to Glory**; Koh Jia Ler — Ilo Ilo; Yang Liang-yu — A Time in Quchi; Huang Shao-yang — Together; Dong Zijian — Young Style	**Best Original Screenplay**: **Anthony Chen — Ilo Ilo**; Jia Zhangke — A Touch of Sin; Chu Yu-ning — To My Dear Granny; Wai Ka-fai, Yau Nai-hoi, Ray Chan and Yu Xi — Drug War; Zhou Zhiyong, Zhang Ji and Aubrey Lam — American Dreams in China
**Best Adapted Screenplay**: **Li Qiang — So Young**; Liu Zhenyun — Back to 1942; Stephen Chow, Derek Kwok, Jiro Lee and Y. Y. Kong — Journey to the West: Conquering the Demons	**Best Cinematography**: **Philippe Le Sourd — The Grandmaster**; Nakashima Nagao — Soul; Lü Yue — Back to 1942; Yu Lik-wai — A Touch of Sin; Liao Pen-jung, Shong Woon-chong, Lu Qing-xin — Stray Dogs
**Best Visual Effects**: **Pierre Buffin — The Grandmaster**; Chang Hong-song — Back to 1942; Lee In-ho, Kim Jong-pil, Ken Law Wai-ho and Wing Tsang — Journey to the West: Conquering the Demons; Enoch Chan — Rigor Mortis; Chas Chau Chi-shing, Lewis Chan Chi-ho, Johnny Lin and Shaun Su — When a Wolf Falls in Love with a Sheep	**Best Art Direction**: **William Chang and Alfred Yau — The Grandmaster**; Chao Shih-hao — Soul; Shi Haiying — Back to 1942; Li Yang — So Young; Penny Tsai Pei-ling — When a Wolf Falls in Love with a Sheep
**Best Makeup & Costume Design**: **William Chang — The Grandmaster**; Timmy Yip — Back to 1942; Bruce Yu and Lee Pik-kwan — Journey to the West: Conquering the Demons; Miggy Cheng, Phoebe Wong, Heidi Chun and Kittichon Kunratchol — Rigor Mortis; Dora Ng — American Dreams in China	**Best Action Choreography**: **Jackie Chan, He Jun and JC Stunt Team — CZ12**; Shing Mak — The Way We Dance; Yuen Woo-ping — The Grandmaster; Tony Ling Chi-wah — Unbeatable; Stephen Chow and Ku Huen-chiu — Journey to the West: Conquering the Demons
**Best Original Film Score**: **Lim Giong — A Touch of Sin**; Ricky Ho and Nolay Piho — Beyond Beauty: Taiwan from Above; Patrick Jonsson — Bends; Wu Rui-ran — A Time in Quchi; Owen Wang — Zone Pro Site	**Best Original Film Song**: **"I Love You" — Rock Me to the Moon**; **Composer: Spark Chen**; **Lyrics: Spark Chen**; **Performer: Sleepy Dads**; "Make a Film" — Forever Love; Composer: Ah Di-zai and Liao Wei-chieh; Lyrics: Ah Di-zai; Performer: One Two Free; "To Youth" — So Young; Composer: Dou Peng; Lyrics: Li Qiang; Performer: Faye Wong; "Jin Ma Mo Un" — Zone Pro Site; Composer: Ma Nien-hsien; Lyrics: Ma Nien-hsien; Performer: Lin Mei-hsiu; "Old Love Song" — Together; Composer: Suming; Lyrics: Sonia Sui and Suming; Performer: Kenny Bee
**Best Film Editing**: **Matthieu Laclau and Lin Xudong — A Touch of Sin**; William Chang, Benjamin Courtines and Poon Hung-yiu — The Grandmaster; Azrael Chung — Unbeatable; David Richardson and Allen Leung Chin-lun — Drug War; Xiao Yang — American Dreams in China	**Best Sound Effects**: **Tu Duu-chih and Kuo Li-chi — Soul**; Wu Shu-yao and Lee Yu-chih — Pusu Qhuni; Robert Mackenzie and Traithep Wongpaiboon — The Grandmaster; Phyllis Cheng — Unbeatable; Tu Duu-chih, Kuo Li-chi and Mark Ford — Stray Dogs
**Audience Choice Award**: **The Grandmaster**; Ilo Ilo; A Touch of Sin; Stray Dogs; Drug War	**FIPRESCI Prize** **(award for first and second features)**: **Rigor Mortis**
**NETPAC Award** **(award for feature films by Asian new talent)**: **Mary Is Happy, Mary Is Happy**
**Outstanding Taiwanese Filmmaker of the Year**: **Yeh Jufeng**; Tsai Ming-hsiu; Liao Ching-sung	**Lifetime Achievement Award**: **Chen Chen**
