= Light the Night =

Taiwanese television series

- Also known as: Blue Hour

Chinese name
- Traditional Chinese: 華燈初上
- Simplified Chinese: 华灯初上
Transcriptions
Standard Mandarin
- Hanyu Pinyin: Huá Dēng Chū Shàng
- Genre: Drama; Mystery; Suspense; Thriller
- Developed by: FengCai Entertainment; Domo
- Written by: Tu Cheng-che; Hong Li-yen; Lin Shao-chien
- Directed by: Lien Yi-chi
- Presented by: Mark Chang; Sammy Yang; Jason Chen
- Starring: Ruby Lin; Yo Yang; Cheryl Yang; Rhydian Vaughan; Derek Chang; Esther Liu; Puff Kuo; Cherry Hsieh; Nikki Hsieh
- Country of origin: Taiwan
- Original language: Mandarin
- No. of seasons: 3
- No. of episodes: 24

Production
- Executive producer: Aben Lee
- Producers: Ruby Lin; Nick Tai
- Cinematography: Ming Wang
- Editor: Chen Chun-hung
- Running time: 45-55 minutes
- Production companies: Bossdom Digiinnovation; Gift Pictures
- Budget: NT$250,000,000(~US$8.97 million)

Original release
- Network: Netflix
- Release: 26 November 2021 – March 18, 2022

Light the Night (traditional Chinese: 華燈初上; simplified Chinese: 华灯初上), previously known as Blue Hour, is a 2021 Taiwanese Netflix original series written by Ryan Tu and directed by Lien Yi-chi. The series stars Ruby Lin, Yo Yang, Cheryl Yang, Rhydian Vaughan, Derek Chang, Puff Kuo, Esther Liu, Cherry Hsieh and Nikki Hsieh.

== Synopsis ==
=== Season 1 ===
In 1988, teenagers find a dead body in the woods; months earlier, two madams at Light Bar struggle with the men in their lives.

=== Season 2 ===
At the end of the second season of Light the Night, Chiang Han is listening to a tape recorder handed over to him earlier by Rose. It has a recording of a woman panicking about another woman's death. Just as Chiang Han is on his way to meet Rose, he is hit by a speeding car and collapses on the road.

=== Season 3 ===
It is revealed that Rose came to work at Light after being released from prison, having taken the fall for her unscrupulous husband (Joseph Cheng). While serving time, Rose befriended Hana (Esther Liu), who also comes to work at Light upon her release.

== Cast ==
=== Main starring ===
- Ruby Lin as Lo Yu-nung a.k.a. Rose, the manager of 'Hikari'
- Yo Yang as Pan Wen-cheng, a detective
- Cheryl Yang as Su Ching-yi a.k.a. Sue, the owner of 'Hikari'
- Rhydian Vaughan as Chiang Han, a famous television screenwriter
- Derek Chang as He Yu-en, a college student
- Esther Liu as Li Shu-hua a.k.a. Hana, a hostess of 'Hikari'
- Cherry Hsieh as Chi Man-ju a.k.a. Ah-chi, a hostess of 'Hikari'
- Nikki Hsieh as Huang Pai-he a.k.a. Yuri, a hostess of 'Hikari'
- Puff Kuo as Wang Ai-lien a.k.a. Aiko, a hostess of 'Hikari', Yu-en's classmate

=== Co-starring ===
- Cammy Chiang as Lin Ya-wen a.k.a. Yaya, an accountant and a hostess of 'Hikari'
- Hu Wei-jie as Ting Chia-hao a.k.a. Hsiao-hao, a waiter of 'Hikari'
- Nash Zhang as Li Chien-ta a.k.a. Ah-ta, a detective
- Dora Hsieh as Yen Chiao-ju a.k.a. Mei-mei, a detective
- Jimmy Liu as Wu Tsu-wei, Yu-nung and Shao-chiang's son

=== Guest-starring ===
- Wallace Huo as Ma Tien-hua a.k.a. Hinoki, Ching-yi's sworn brother, a notorious gangster
- Joseph Cheng as Wu Shao-chiang, Yu-nung's husband (part 1, 3)
- Wang Po-chieh as Henry, a host of 'Ciao' who is in love with Yu-ri
- Kai Hsiu as Ko Chih-hao, a prosecutor
- Lee Lee-zen as Hsu Kuo-piao a.k.a. Piao-ke, a gangster (part 1)
- Kagami Tomohisa as Nakamura Masao, a customer of 'Hikari'
- Chu Chung-heng as Sun Ming-chang, Wen-cheng's superior
- Ken Lin as Feng, a television producer (part 1-2)
- Lorene Jen as Hsiao Wan-jou, a famous actress (part 1-2)
- Wu Kang-ren as Liu Pao-lung a.k.a. Pao-pao, the owner of 'Sugar', a cross-dressing hostess (part 2-3)
- Wang Ching-ying as Su Mei-yu, Ching-yi's mother (part 2-3)
- Yi Cheng as Chu Wen-hsiung, the neighbor of the Lo family, Mei-yu's ex-lover (part 2-3)
- Gingle Wang as young Lo Yu-nung (part 2-3)
- Tseng Jing-hua as young Wu Shao-chiang (part 2-3)
- Jean Ho as young Su Ching-yi (part 2)

=== Guest appearances ===
- Greg Hsu as Yu-en's classmate (part 1)
- Shen Meng-sheng as Lo Chun-sheng, Yu-nung's father (part 1-2)
- Moon Wang as Lo Hsieh Hsueh-ling, Yu-nung's mother (part 1-2)
- James Wen as Lo Li-nung, Yu-nung's elder brother (part 1)
- June Tsai as Lo I-nung, Yu-nung's elder sister (part 1-2)
- Ma Nien-hsien as Tsai Huo-wang, the owner of a izakaya
- Heaven Hai as Ko Hsiu-chih, the owner of a barbershop (part 1-2)
- Hans Chung as Kevin Cheng, the manager of 'Ciao' (part 1)
- Chen Bor-jeng as Shu-hua's father (part 1, 3)
- Fan Jui-chun as Ai-lien's mother (part 1, 3)
- JC Lin as a student of mountain climbing club who found dead body (part 1)
- Wang Yu-xuan as a student of mountain climbing club who found dead body (part 1)
- Edison Song as a student of mountain climbing club who found dead body (part 1)
- Ying Tsai-ling as Zhang Yi-fen, the dean of orphanage (part 2-3)
- Kitamura Toyoharu as a customer of 'Hikari' (part 1)
- Berry Kuo as a cake shop clerk (part 2)
- Vivian Hsu as Chiung-fang, the ex-owner of 'Hikari' (part 2)
- Chang Yung-cheng as president Fang, an advertisers who is Hsiao Wan-jou's boyfriend (part 2)
- Austin Lin as magazine club senior (part 2-3)
- 9m88 a hostess of 'Hikari' (part 2)
- Tang Chih-wei as Li Ssu-ching, a host of television program (part 2)
- Emerson Tsai as a customer of 'Sugar' (part 3)
- Ray Chang as Shu-hua's ex-boyfriend (part 3)

=== Supporting ===
- Chien Shao-feng as a student of mountain climbing club who found dead body (part 1)
- Wu Kun-da as Pai Lung, the owner of cafe (part 1)

== Episodes ==
Season	Episodes	Originally released
1	8	November 26, 2021
2	8	December 30, 2021
3	8	March 18, 2022

== Production ==
Six female leads attended the press meeting held in Taipei on September 11, 2020. Also, unveiled their male actors line up on October 14, 2020. Over 250 million Taiwanese dollars were spent to produce the 24-episode series, which features extravagant sets and costumes. The original series planned to be broadcast only in TVBS, but the high-standard production and unique story themes attracted the attention of streaming platform Netflix, and finally they attained its overseas distribution rights for over 300 million Taiwanese dollars.

== Release ==
Light the Night Season 1 was released globally on November 26, 2021 on Netflix. The series' first season was released in three parts. On November 22, 2021, a few days before the series premiere, the first two episodes of the first part was screened at the 58th Taipei Golden Horse Film Festival.

== Awards and nominations ==
Year	Award	Category	Recipient(s)	Result
2021	Yahoo Asia Buzz Awards	Popular Television Series	Light the Night	Won
2022	57th Golden Bell Awards	Best Television Series	Light the Night	Nominated
2022	57th Golden Bell Awards	Best Actor	Yo Yang	Nominated
2022	57th Golden Bell Awards	Best Actress	Ruby Lin	Nominated
2022	57th Golden Bell Awards	Best Actress	Cheryl Yang	Nominated
2022	57th Golden Bell Awards	Best Supporting Actor	Nash Zhang	Nominated
2022	57th Golden Bell Awards	Best Supporting Actress	Esther Liu	Nominated
2022	57th Golden Bell Awards	Best Supporting Actress	Cherry Hsieh	Nominated
2022	57th Golden Bell Awards	Best Director	Lien Yi-chi	Nominated
2022	57th Golden Bell Awards	Best Writing for a Television Series	Tu Cheng-che, Hong Li-yen, Lin Shao-chien	Nominated
2022	57th Golden Bell Awards	Creative Award for a Drama Series	Light the Night	Nominated
2022	57th Golden Bell Awards	Best Score for a Drama Series	Wen Tzu-chieh	Nominated
2022	5th Asian Academy Creative Awards	Best Drama Series	Light the Night	Nominated
2022	5th Asian Academy Creative Awards	Best Actor In a Supporting Role	Wu Kang-ren	Won
2022	5th Asian Academy Creative Awards	Best Actress In a Leading Role	Cheryl Yang	Nominated
2022	5th Asian Academy Creative Awards	Best Direction (Fiction)	Lien Yi-chi	Nominated
2022	5th Asian Academy Creative Awards	Best Screenplay	Tu Cheng-che	Nominated

== Soundtrack ==
Light the Night Original Soundtrack (OST)

Soundtrack album by Various artists
- Released: 1 Jan 2022
- Genre: Mandopop
- Languages: Mandarin; Taiwanese Hokkien
- Label: B'in Music

Light the Night Original Soundtrack (OST) (華燈初上影集原聲帶) was released on January 1, 2022 by various artists. It contains a total of 9 tracks. The OST album is available for streaming on various music streaming platforms

No.	Title	Lyrics	Music	Singers	Length
1.	"The Moon Represents My Heart" (Opening song)	Sun Yi	Weng Ching-hsi	Ashin	03:48
2.	"Finally" (Ending song)	Pan Yun-An	Pan Yun-An	Accusefive	04:55
3.	"Love, Loved, Loving"	Wu Sheng-hao	Lin Che-an	Mixer	04:02
4.	"Rainy Night Flower"	Chiu Thiam-ong	Teng Yu-hsien	Jiajia	03:21
5.	"Shattered"			Fran Chen	04:05
6.	"Don't Love Me, Please"	Wu Sheng-hao	Blackie Wu	Ruby Lin	04:49
7.	"Alone"	Ring	Ring	Ring	03:45
8.	"Place of First Love"	Sun Yi	Liu Chia-chang	Jiajia	02:56
9.	"How Are You"	Kidding Chiu	Kidding Chiu	Arrow Wei	04:28
