= Andy Wu =

Andy Wu may refer to:

- Andy Wu (actor), a Taiwanese actor
- Andy Wu (wrestler), a Japanese wrestler
