= Sharon Hsu =

Taiwanese actress and singer

- 許維恩
- Born: 11 November 1981 (age 44); Taipei, Taiwan
- Citizenship: Republic of China
- Occupations: Model; singer; actress
- Relatives: Sister: Hsu Lu Er; Sister: Hsu Feifei
- Modeling information
- Agency: Haiwang Tianyi Culture Media

Sharon Hsu (Chinese: 許維恩; pinyin: Xǔ Wéi'ēn; Wade–Giles: Hsu^{3} Wei^{2}-en^{1}; born 11 November 1981) is a Taiwanese actress and singer of Dutch descent. She has had roles in a number of films and television series. On 22 June 2012, her first EP album Wien's Secret Garden was released.

== Personal background ==
In 2009, Sharon Hsu married Alex Tien En Pei, member of B. A. D., but they divorced in November 2012.

== Filmography ==
=== TV series ===
Year	Network	Title	Role
2009	CTS	Knock Knock Loving You	Coco
2013	MTV	PMAM	Zhao Yinyin
2016	CTV	Golden Darling	Jenny
2017	TTV	Jojo's World	Ding Shuqi

=== Films ===
Year	Title	Role
2014	Zombie Fight Club	Female courier
2015	One Night in Taipei	Xiao Ding
2017	The Treasure	
2018	Gatao 2-The New Leader Rising	Tang Ling
2018	My Surprise Girl	
2018	Love You After Drunk	

=== Internet dramas ===
Year	Title	Role
2012	Diors Man	Guest
2014	Diors Man 3	Guest

== Discography ==
=== EP ===
Title	Year	Tracks
Wien's Secret Garden	2012	1. Happiness is your tenderness 2. Jet lag 3. Sweet Lies

=== Music videos ===
- 2003 "Rotary wood" (Faye Wong)
- 2004 "Bless me" (Z-Chen)
- 2004 "Love" (Wang Leehom)
- 2005 "The girl said to me" (Yida Huang)
- 2005 "Flare" (Jones)
- 2005 "White pattern" (5566)
- 2005 "Ask you questions from day to day" (A Wei Chang)
- 2006 "Heroes of Earth" (Chinese version) (Wang Leehom)
- 2007 "Touch" (Kelvin Tan)
- 2008 "Treasure" (Shino Lin)
- 2008 "Stop point" (Shino Lin)

== Advertising endorsements ==
- Watsons (running articles) CF
- Taiwan Vodka
- Public Welfare Young Club CF
- Far East Bank CF
- Shanghai Miguan Wedding Dress CF
- Venus (graphic)
- Toshiba MP3 (flyer)
- Pantene Shampoo CF
- Farong Construction CF
- Unified Instant Noodles (Jay Chou)
- Taishin Bank JCB Card CF
- Ice Fire Vodka CF
- Eclipse Mint CF
- Fuji Camera CF
- Baleno apparel (flyer)
- Daily C Juice
- Takashima Foot Massager
- Kim Lan Soy Sauce
- Live Benefits
- Bausch & Lomb
- Life Market
- Myeongdong International Mdmmd. Makeup (endorsement)
- Beauty Fashion Eyelashes (endorsement)
- Hand Tour Zhu Xian 2 (dual endorsement with Ivy Shao)
- China Mitsubishi Motors (dual endorsement with Dai-Kang Yang)

== Magazines ==
- Ray
- Vivi
- Nong Nong
- Elle
- Vogue
- Beautiful Beauty
- Kompodan
- Bazaar
- GQ
- Money
- Tokyo Clothes
- Orange
- With
- Mina
- Man' style
- FHM
