= Cape No. 7 =

- Theatrical poster
- Chinese: 海角七號
- Directed by: Wei Te-sheng
- Written by: Wei Te-sheng
- Produced by: Jimmy Huang; Wei Te-sheng
- Starring: Van Fan; Chie Tanaka; Kousuke Atari; Rachel Liang; Johnny C.J. Lin; Ming Hsiung; Ying Wei-min; Ma Nien-hsien; Joanne Yang; Bjanav Zenror; Ma Ju-lung; Hsiao-Lan Pei; Chang Kuei; Shino Lin; Pei-Chen Lee; Chang Hsin-yan
- Cinematography: Chin Ting-chang
- Edited by: Milk Su; Lai Hui-chuan
- Music by: Lo Chi-yi; Fred Lu
- Production company: ARS Film Production
- Distributed by: Buena Vista International
- Release dates: 20 June 2008 (Taipei Film Festival); 22 August 2008 (Taiwan)
- Running time: 129 minutes
- Country: Taiwan
- Languages: Taiwanese; Mandarin; Japanese
- Budget: NT$50 million (US$1.5 million)
- Box office: Taiwan: NT$530 million (US$16 million); Hong Kong: HK$7.62 million (US$1 million)

Cape No. 7 (Chinese: 海角七號; pinyin: Hǎijiǎo Qī Hào; Pe̍h-ōe-jī: Hái-kak Chhit-hō; Japanese: 海角七号; rōmaji: kaikaku nana gō) is a 2008 Taiwanese romantic musical comedy-drama film written and directed by Wei Te-sheng, his first full-length motion picture. The film is in Taiwanese and Mandarin with significant lines in Japanese. Before its commercial release, the film had its world premiere on 20 June 2008 at the 2008 Taipei Film Festival as the opening film. The film later won 3 awards at the festival.

Prior to this film, the two leading actors Van Fan and Chie Tanaka only had minor acting experience while some of the supporting roles were filled by non-actors. Even without a strong promotional campaign, the film became hugely popular in Taiwan that on 1 November 2008 it became the second highest-grossing film in the country's cinematic history, behind James Cameron's Titanic. The film has grossed over US$13,804,531 since its release. It is also currently the highest grossing Taiwanese domestic film.

The film has won 15 awards to date, including 6 at the 2008 Golden Horse Awards. It was also Taiwan's entry to compete in the 81st Academy Awards for Best Foreign Language Film, although it did not secure a nomination.

== Plot ==
In the 1940s near the end of the Japanese occupation of Taiwan, an unnamed teacher (Atari) dispatched to the southernmost town of Hengchun falls in love with a local girl with the Japanese name Kojima Tomoko (Liang). After the Surrender of Japan, the teacher is forced to return home as Taiwan was placed under the administrative control of the Republic of China. On his trip home, he pens seven love letters to express his regret for leaving Kojima Tomoko, who originally planned to elope with him to Japan.

More than 60 years later, Aga (Fan), a struggling young rock band singer leaves Taipei to return to his hometown of Hengchun. There, his step father (Ma), the Town Council Representative, arranges a position for him as a postman, replacing the aging Old Mao (C. Lin), on leave after a motorcycle accident broke his leg. One day, Aga comes across an undeliverable piece of mail that was supposed to be returned to the sender in Japan; the daughter of the now deceased Japanese teacher had decided to mail the unsent love letters to Taiwan after discovering them. Aga unlawfully keeps and opens the package to discover its contents, but the old Japanese-style address "Cape No. 7, Kōshun District, Takao Prefecture" can no longer be found.

Meanwhile, a local resort hotel in nearby Kenting National Park is organizing a beach concert featuring Japanese pop singer Kousuke Atari, but Aga's step father makes use of his official position to insist that the opening band be composed of locals. Tomoko (Tanaka), an over-the-hill Mandarin-speaking Japanese fashion model dispatched to Hengchun, is assigned the difficult task of managing this hastily assembled band, led by Aga along with six other locals of rather particular backgrounds. After a frustrating trial period, Aga and Tomoko unexpectedly begin a relationship. With some assistance from hotel maid Mingchu (S. Lin), who is revealed to be Kojima Tomoko's granddaughter, Tomoko helps Aga find the rightful recipient of the seven love letters. Tomoko then tells Aga that she plans on returning to Japan after the concert because of a job offer. After returning the seven love letters, a heartbroken but determined Aga returns to the beach resort and performs a highly successful concert with his local band alongside Kousuke Atari while Kojima Tomoko reads the letters.

== Cast ==
Actor	Role	Note(s)
Van Fan	Aga	The band's lead singer. Hengchun native who recently returned to the town after failing to find success in Taipei.
Chie Tanaka	Tomoko	Japanese model and agent assigned to organize the local band.
Kousuke Atari	Japanese teacher in flashback scenes/himself in the present.	He is an actual pop star in real life
Rachel Liang	Kojima Tomoko (小島友子) in flashback scenes.	Was left behind by her lover.
Johnny C.J. Lin (林宗仁)	Old Mao	Postman; yueqinist, bassist and tambourineist in the band, close to 80 years old. Proud of having his talents referred to by the yueqin as a "national treasure" and desperate to perform in any capacity possible. Capable of speaking Japanese.
Ming Hsiung (民雄)	Rauma	Short-tempered Policeman of Rukai tribe origin; guitarist in the band. Abandoned by his wife. Left the Taiwan police special forces for his wife before she abandoned him.
Ying Wei-min	Frog	Mechanic in a local motorcycle shop; drummer of the band. Infatuated with his boss' wife.
Ma Nien-hsien	Malasun	Diligent alcohol salesman of Hakka origin from nearby Baoli Village, Checheng Township; bassist in the band.
Joanne Yang (楊蕎安)	Dada	10-year-old girl who plays piano in local church; keyboardist in the band.
Bjanav Zenror (丹耐夫正若)	Olalan	Rauma's father; policeman; former bassist in the band.
Ma Ju-lung	Hong Kuo-jung, Town Council Representative	Aga's step father; insists on allowing local talent to perform in the concert.
Hsiao-Lan Pei (沛小嵐)	Aga's mother	
Chang Kuei (張魁)	Hotel Manager	Under pressure from Aga's stepfather, was forced to allow the band formed by locals to perform in the concert.
Shino Lin	Lin Mingchu	Hotel maid; capable of speaking Japanese. Kojima Tomoko's granddaughter and Dada's mother.
Lee Pei-chen (李佩甄)	Motorcycle shop owner's wife	Buxom, with triplet sons. Frog's employer's wife and infatuation.
Chang Hsin-yan	Meiling	Hotel receptionist. Originally had disputes but later developed brief relationship with Malasun.
Yukihiko Kageyama (蔭山征彦)	Narrator of the teacher's love letters	Voice only

== Production ==
The inspiration for Cape No. 7 came in July 2004 when director Wei read a report about a Yunlin postman who successfully delivered a piece of mail addressed in the old Japanese style - the sender was the former Japanese employer of the recipient. Wei decided to make a film based on this story, in the hopes of financing his long-awaited epic film Seediq Bale, which had problems securing financial interest.

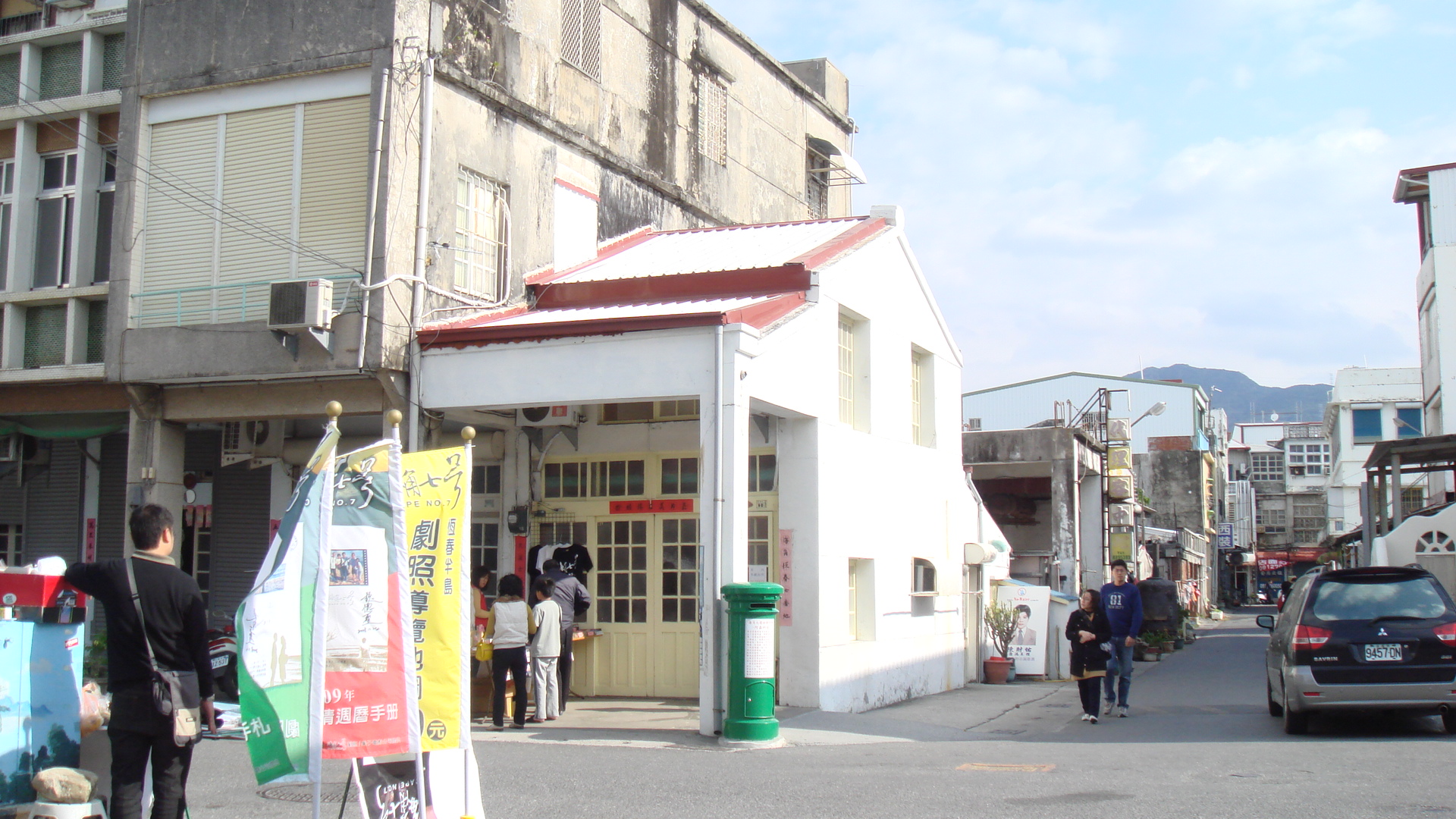
Aga's House, Hengchun, Republic of China (Taiwan)

By the end of 2006 Wei had finished Cape No. 7's script. He was subsequently awarded NT$ 5 million for winning the "Domestic Film Fund" from Taiwan's Government Information Office. Wei said he picked Hengchun as the film's setting due to its richness in contrasts: mountains along with beaches; the old towns near the modern resort hotels; the aging population with the young working in Taipei; the diversified demographics with Hoklo, Hakka, Mainlanders, Taiwanese aborigines, and international tourists; the weather variation between the tropical southern Taiwan and the snow-laden Japan. Wei believed that such a setting would provide the ideal backdrop for the "harmony in diversity" theme of Cape No. 7.

The film was shot between September and November 2007 in Hengchun and its neighboring Checheng and Manjhou Townships, located on the Hengchun Peninsula of Pingtung County. The set for the 'Hotel Chateau' (where the concert is held and at which model Tomoko stays) was the real life Château Beach Resort at Kenting. A few scenes were also filmed in Fangliao Township and Jiadong Township of Pingtung County, Kaohsiung International Airport, Ximending and Wenshan District in Taipei. The final scene presenting the Japanese teacher (Kousuke Atari) and other Japanese people leaving Taiwan by ship was filmed in an abandoned brewery in Taichung with more than 500 extras. Before filming, Chie Tanaka had been staying in Taiwan for 15 months to study Chinese so she did not have major problems dealing with the Chinese lines in the film. Kousuke Atari played himself and as the 1940s Japanese teacher in this film.

As the production went over budget, Wei had problems securing additional capital; he subsequently refinanced his home and forced his family NT$30 million (approx. US$900,000) into debt before release. Cast members Pei-Chen Lee and Chang Hsin-yan revealed that during filming Wei could barely afford the film rolls and lodging for the crew. Wei later said this film's zealous reception should help him manage his debts.

Wei believed "that the films that hit the screens before the end of summer vacation in 2007 were all 'safe bets'", because they avoided competition from Hollywood blockbusters. Wei followed this theory when he released Cape No. 7 in 2008. Besides, Wei focused on the promotion of the film. The film was premiered in July, 2008, and attracted the interest of Buena Vista International, which made 50 copies of the film and distributed them nationally in August.

The film's 133 minute theatrical version was edited from the first cut of 160 minutes. Aga and Tomoko's love scene was shortened, and some of their dialog before the love scene was cut as well. The final version was shortened in Mainland China after the government film agency snipped out over half an hour of the film for political purposes. Nevertheless, rampant piracy in Mainland China saw the unedited version mass distributed via street stalls and the internet.

The film's marketing is combined with extensive merchandise, including original soundtrack CD, books, novelization, accessories, tours and musical concerts. The film contributed tourism for Hengchun, and especially boosted 'Hotel Chateau'. A televised concert was held with actors performing some numbers in the film.

== Music ==
A soundtrack album was released on 24 October 2008 by Forward Music.

1. "The First Letter: "Tomoko, Are You Still Waiting for Me?" (Yukihiko Kageyama)
2. "Don't Wanna" (Van Fan)
3. "The Second Letter: Destiny Is this Era's Sin" (Yukihiko Kageyama)
4. "Love You to Death" (Joanne Yang, etc.)
5. "The Third Letter: Tomoko, I Fell in Love with You at that Moment" (Yukihiko Kageyama)
6. "Where to Go" (Bjanav Zenror)
7. "The Fourth Letter: Why the Sea Breeze Always Brings Weep" (Yukihiko Kageyama)
8. "To Daughter" (Patricia Ho)
9. "The Fifth Letter: Tomoko, I Really Miss You: Ah! Rainbow!" (Yukihiko Kageyama)
10. "As Happy as Can Be" (live version from the film) (Van Fan, Johnny C.J. Lin, Ming Hsiung, Ying Wei-Min, Ma Nien-hsien, Joanne Yang)
11. "The Sixth Letter: I Write My Shame into the Last Letter" (Yukihiko Kageyama)
12. "South of Border" (Van Fan)
13. "Heidenröslein" (Van Fan, Kousuke Atari, Chie Tanaka)
14. "The Seventh and Last Letter" (Van Fan)
15. "1945" (orchestral version)

For an unspecified reason the soundtrack album does not include the film's ending theme, "Beautiful Scenery" performed by Rachel Liang.

== Reception ==
=== Domestic ===
Although the film only attracted moderate box-office success during its first weeks of release, it was helped by strong word of mouth buzz, mainly in blogs and on the Professional Technology Temple (PTT) Bulletin Board System, eventually leading to its record-breaking box-office performance.

Robert Chen, an assistant professor in the Department of Radio and Television at National Chengchi University, suggests that the 2007–2008 Writers Guild of America strike may have reduced competition and that the distributor avoided a direct scheduling confrontation with The Dark Knight.

Date	Accumulated box-office in Taipei (NT$)	Milestone
Aug 29, 2008	5.66 million	
Sep 11, 2008	28.18 million	surpassed Secret to become the top-selling Taiwan-made film in this island's cinematic history
Sep 18, 2008	51.99 million	
Sep 27, 2008	109 million	surpassed The Dark Knight's 109-million accumulated Taipei sales record
Oct 4, 2008	151 million	surpassed Lust, Caution's 136-million accumulated Taipei sales record
Oct 6, 2008	164 million	surpassed Police Story 3's 156-million accumulated Taipei sales record to become the top-selling mandarin-language film in Taiwan history
Oct 14, 2008	201 million	surpassed The Lord of the Rings: The Return of the King's 200-million accumulated Taipei sales record to become the 4th top-selling film in Taiwan history
Oct 19, 2008	215 million	surpassed The Lost World: Jurassic Park's 213-million accumulated Taipei sales record to become the 3rd top-selling film in Taiwan history
Nov 1, 2008	225.7 million	surpassed Jurassic Park's 225.2-million accumulated Taipei sales record to become the 2nd top-selling film in Taiwan history, only behind James Cameron's Titanic's 387.8-million
Dec 12, 2008	232 million	Final Taipei box-office (530 million total for the entire country)

Critics attribute the film's box office success to its honest depiction of the rural southern Taiwan; the strong emotional resonance among older viewers; the humorous tone, optimistic characters, and musical performances.

The film was used an example by critics to analyze how film profit is shared in Taiwan. It was estimated that the revenue from the film is around NTD 520 million, and the production cost to be NTD 50 million. After the deducting the production costs, 60% of the profit goes to movie theaters, 10% to the distributor. The director gets 10%, which is about NT$140 million.

=== International ===
The film gathered widespread attention at the 2008 Pusan International Film Festival where its broadcasting rights were successfully sold to Hong Kong; South Korea; Malaysia and Brunei, through Astro Entertainment Sdn Bhd and All Asia Multimedia Network, both subsidiaries of Malaysian pay-TV group Astro All Asia Networks; and Singapore. The Hong Kong release date was on 20 November 2008 and the film ranked first during its first week of release. Local critics found this film "civil, humorous, and friendly". The Singapore release date was originally 1 January 2009 but distributors decided to release this film earlier on 27 November 2008 so as to satisfy demand from Singaporeans and to fight piracy. The film made its United States premiere on 10 October 2008 in Honolulu at the Hawaii International Film Festival, where it won the Halekulani Golden Orchid Award for Best Narrative. Its premiere in the Continental United States was on 12 December 2008 in Los Angeles.

== Critiques on Soundtrack ==
The official film soundtrack of Cape No. 7 was published by the Forward Music Co., Ltd. A representative song from Cape No. 7 called "Beautiful Scenery" was not included in the soundtrack, which made movie fans feel disappointed.[1] Due to this, fans raise doubts about the film company's claim of “carefully producing the album.”[2]

== Controversies on storyline ==
There have been controversies about whether Cape No. 7 advocates for "Japanophilia" or contains any "political metaphors." It has been discussed that it addresses the complex historical relationship between Taiwan and Japan. The film's depiction of a romantic relationship between a Taiwanese woman and a Japanese man, as well as the portrayal of the Japanese colonial period in Taiwan, have been subject to interpretation and debate. These discussions have taken place on major websites after the release of the film.

The United Daily News published an editorial criticizing the film as "marred by colonial thoughts during the Japanese era" on 11 October 2008. Wang Feng, a week-known Taiwanese media worker, described Cape No. 7 as a "social cancer" from the Cultural Revolution. However, Lin Quanzhong, a Chinese professor from Japan, offered an interpretation of the meaning of Cape No. 7 from the perspectives of the "center" and the "periphery." He criticized the idea of “Japanophilia" as an "overreaction" and suggests that people should approach their understanding of the film with humble attitudes. Same thing was addressed by Hsu Chieh-lin, a professor at National Taiwan University, who believed that Cape No. 7 is simply a subculture that includes both American and Japanese cultures.

Chen Yunlin, the Chairman of the Association for Relations Across the Taiwan Straits (ARATS), publicly praised this film after a private screening in November 2008. However, on 28 November 2008 during a regular ARATS meeting in Beijing, Chen reversed his view and stated that this film was "marred by the shadow of Japanization". He recommended the film be banned in the People's Republic of China. The final release date was further delayed to 14 February 2009 and the version censored by the PRC authorities was only 100-minute long: certain Taiwanese Hokkien slang, foul words, and scenes such as Old Mao speaking Japanese were cut.

== Home media ==
On 14 November 2008, Cape No. 7's distributors announced that the film's official DVD/BD release date will be 19 December 2008. On 30 November 2008 the number of copies ordered in advance had reached 23,000, far surpassing the runner-up record holder in Taiwan's cinematic history, The Lion King's 12,000 reservations in 1995.

== Awards and nominations ==
=== Wins ===
Film Festival	Awards / Recipients
2008 Taipei Film Festival	Best Cinematography (Chin Ting-chang); Grand Prize; Audience Award
2008 Asian Marine Film Festival	Grand Prize
2008 Hawaii International Film Festival	Halekulani Golden Orchid Award for Best Narrative
2008 Kuala Lumpur International Film Festival	Best Cinematography (Chin Ting-chang)
2008 Golden Horse Awards	Best Supporting Actor (Ma Ju-lung); Best Original Film Score (Fred Lu, Lo Chi-Yi); Best Original Film Song (Matthew Yen, Tseng Chih-Hao, Van Fan); Audience Choice Award; Outstanding Taiwanese Film of the Year; Outstanding Taiwanese Filmmaker of the Year (Wei Te-sheng)
3rd Asian Film Awards	Edward Yang New Talent Award (Wei Te-sheng)
9th Chinese Film Media Awards	The Juries' Special Award
2009 Shanghai Film Critics Awards	Film of Merit

=== Nominations ===
Film Festival	Awards / nominees
2008 Kuala Lumpur International Film Festival	Best Director (Wei Te-sheng); Best Asian Film
2008 Golden Horse Awards	Best Feature Film; Best Director (Wei Te-sheng); Best New Performer (Chie Tanaka, Johnny C.J. Lin); Best Cinematography(Chin Ting-chang); Best Sound Effect (Tu Du-Chi)
2008 Festival International du film asiatique de Vesoul	Asian Feature Film
28th Hong Kong Film Awards	Best Asian Film
