= All You Need Is Love (2015 film) =

2015 Hong Kong-Chinese-Taiwanese film by Richie Jen

- Film poster
- Traditional Chinese: 落跑吧愛情
- Simplified Chinese: 落跑吧爱情
- Hanyu Pinyin: Luò Pǎo Ba Ài Qíng
- Jyutping: Lok6 Paau2 Baa6 Ngoi3 Cing4
- Directed by: Richie Jen; Andy Luo
- Screenplay by: Andy Luo; Richie Jen; Chien Shih-keng; Virginia Liu; Shu Qi; Liu Rui-hsuan; Tseng Hsien-chang
- Story by: Lin Chin-he; Virginia Liu
- Produced by: Virginia Liu; Lin Tien-kuei
- Starring: Richie Jen; Shu Qi; Ti Lung; Jiu Kung
- Cinematography: Randy Che
- Edited by: Wenders Li
- Music by: Cola Kai
- Production companies: Media Asia Films; Hengye Film; Shangrila Music Production; Power Generation Entertainment; Daphne International Holdings; Dao Cao Production; Full Entertainment Marketing Corporation; Arrow Cinematic Group; Lee Rong Film & TV Equipment
- Distributed by: Media Asia Distributions (Hong Kong); Hualien Media International (Taiwan)
- Release dates: 4 September 2015 (Taiwan); 10 September 2015 (Hong Kong)
- Running time: 102 minutes
- Countries: Hong Kong; China; Taiwan
- Languages: Mandarin; Taiwanese
- Box office: US$1.5 million

All You Need Is Love is a 2015 romantic comedy film co-written and directed by Richie Jen and Andy Luo, with the former helming his directorial debut. A Hong Kong-Chinese-Taiwanese co-production, the film stars Jen and Shu Qi, who also co-wrote the screenplay.

== Plot ==
Wealthy heiress Yeh Fen-fen flees from her family's constant urging for her to get married, bringing a tape of the song Grandma's Pescadores (Penghu) Bay (外婆的澎湖灣) with her that was left behind by her deceased parents. Fen-fen intends to experience the atmosphere in the song's lyrics and search for the freedom of life. Fen-fen books a seaside villa on the internet and begins her journey with a mind full of imaginations.

Fen-fen, however, unexpectedly ends up living in a crummy bed and breakfast owned by Wu Si-shan, which was a result of false advertisement on the internet by Wu's friends, who wanted to help him expand his business. Fen-fen stays there for a night before angrily leaving. While leaving on a boat ride, Fen-fen's luggage also fall into the sea, leaving her no choice but to stay on the island. Meanwhile, Wu's bed and breakfast had to be closed down due to the fact that his younger brother was cheated in an investment. As a result, Wu has to carry the burden of repaying the high-interest debts.

Fen-fen is a picky and cold princess, while Wu is a carefree and passionate islander. As these two polar opposites encounter in the beautiful island, they embark on a relaxed comical romantic journey.

== Cast ==
- Richie Jen as Wu Si-shan, referred by everyone as Wu, a native Pescadores Islander who runs a bed and breakfast. He has a kind and happy-go-lucky personality.
- Shu Qi as Yeh Fen-fen, a wealthy heiress who arrives in Pescadores Island to search for her parents' memories and flee from her family's arranged marriage of her with an American tycoon, Jack.
- Jiu Kung as Chen Ta-dong, Wu's good friend and the leader of Mosquito Island who is intent on doing something important for his island. However, his plans often backfire and break into disasters.
- Lego Lee as Wu Si-fu, Wu's younger brother.
- Ma Nien-hsien as Ma Nien-hsien, a passionate police officer of Pescadores Island.
- Chuang Hsiu-ching as Ann, Wu's daughter.
- Fang Xu as Fen-fen's uncle
- Tang Chi-yueh as Fen-fen's aunt
- Rim as Green Tea
- Chang Nien-jiung as Dong's girl
- Sara Hsieh as Dong's girl
- Emma Ma as Dong's girl
- Lin Mei-hsiu

=== Special appearance ===
- Ti Lung as Old Captain, Wu's father who spent most of his life sailing in the sea, only returning to his family after retiring at an elderly age. Unable to let go of the thoughts of his deceased wife, he lives his life in guilt and loneliness.
- Lotus Wang as Pearl, Wu's childhood friend who sells fish in the fish market. Growing up together with Wu, she is love struck for him and is intent on marrying him.
- Hu Qiaohua as the presenter of the matchmaking reality TV show, On the Road to Love (愛的路上我和你).
- Vivian Dawson as Jack, an American tycoon who is Fen-fen's fiancé.
- Bowie Tsang as the press conference presenter for Fen-fen's new book, All You Need Is Love (我的澎湖灣).

== Critical reception ==
Piera Chen of The Hollywood Reporter gave the film a negative review citing its predictable plot and unconvincing characters. Edmund Lee of the South China Morning Post gave the film a score of 2 out of 5 stars, citing poorly written characters and inconsistencies. LoveHkFilm gave the film a mixed review describing the plot as "inanity", but praises the chemistry and performances of the leads, writing All You Need Is Love needs a whole lot more to be considered quality, but Shu Qi and Richie Jen get a thumbs up for their very substantial screen charm.
