= Sweet Alibis =

2014 Taiwanese comedy film

- Traditional Chinese: 甜蜜殺機
- Simplified Chinese: 甜蜜杀机
- Directed by: Lien Yi-chi
- Starring: Alec Su; Ariel Lin; Matt Wu; Lei Hong; Lang Tsu-yun; Ken Lin; Chu Chih-ying; Austin Lin; Kao Meng-chieh
- Cinematography: Randy Che
- Release date: 17 January 2014
- Running time: 112 minutes
- Country: Taiwan
- Languages: Mandarin; Taiwanese

Sweet Alibis is a 2014 Taiwanese comedy film starring Alec Su as a cowardly veteran cop and Ariel Lin as an overzealous rookie. The film follows the pair who team up to solve crimes together in Kaohsiung.

== Plot ==
Starting from a seemingly pointless case of a puppy's accidental death, from eating chocolate, the essentially incompatible pair unexpectedly digs up the clues to a series of mysterious deaths.

== Cast ==
- Alec Su
- Ariel Lin
- Matt Wu
- Lei Hong
- Lang Tsu-yun
- Ken Lin
- Chu Chih-ying
- Austin Lin
- Kao Meng-chieh
- Ma Nien-hsien
- Bebe Du
- Tao Chuan-cheng
- Lin Chia-ling
- Lee Kuo-hung
- Ruby Lin - Cameo

== Theme song ==
- "Lao Tian You Yan" (老天有眼) performed by Alec Su (originally sung by Hei-pao in the 1980s)

== Reception ==
It was the number-one film in Taiwan box office for a week in January 2014, but overall grossing was disappointing with only NT$ 20.6 million (roughly $0.6 million) despite generally positive reviews. It was successful in the Chinese box office in March 2014, ranking only behind 2 Taiwanese films — You Are the Apple of My Eye (2011) and Black & White Episode I: The Dawn of Assault (2012) — in first-week grossing. It grossed ¥36.6 million (roughly $6 million) in mainland China.

== Awards ==
- 2014 51st Golden Horse Film Festival and Awards
  - Nominated — Lang Tsu-yun, Best Supporting Actress
- 2014 Osaka Asian Film Festival
  - Nominated — Grand Prix
- 2014 6th Straits Film and Television Awards
  - Won — Favourite Taiwanese film in mainland China

== Trivia ==
There are in-jokes in the film referencing characters from the TV series In Time with You (2011) starring Ariel Lin and Romance in the Rain (2001) starring Alec Su and Ruby Lin.
