= Summer Meng =

Taiwanese actress (born 1991)

Summer Meng 孟耿如
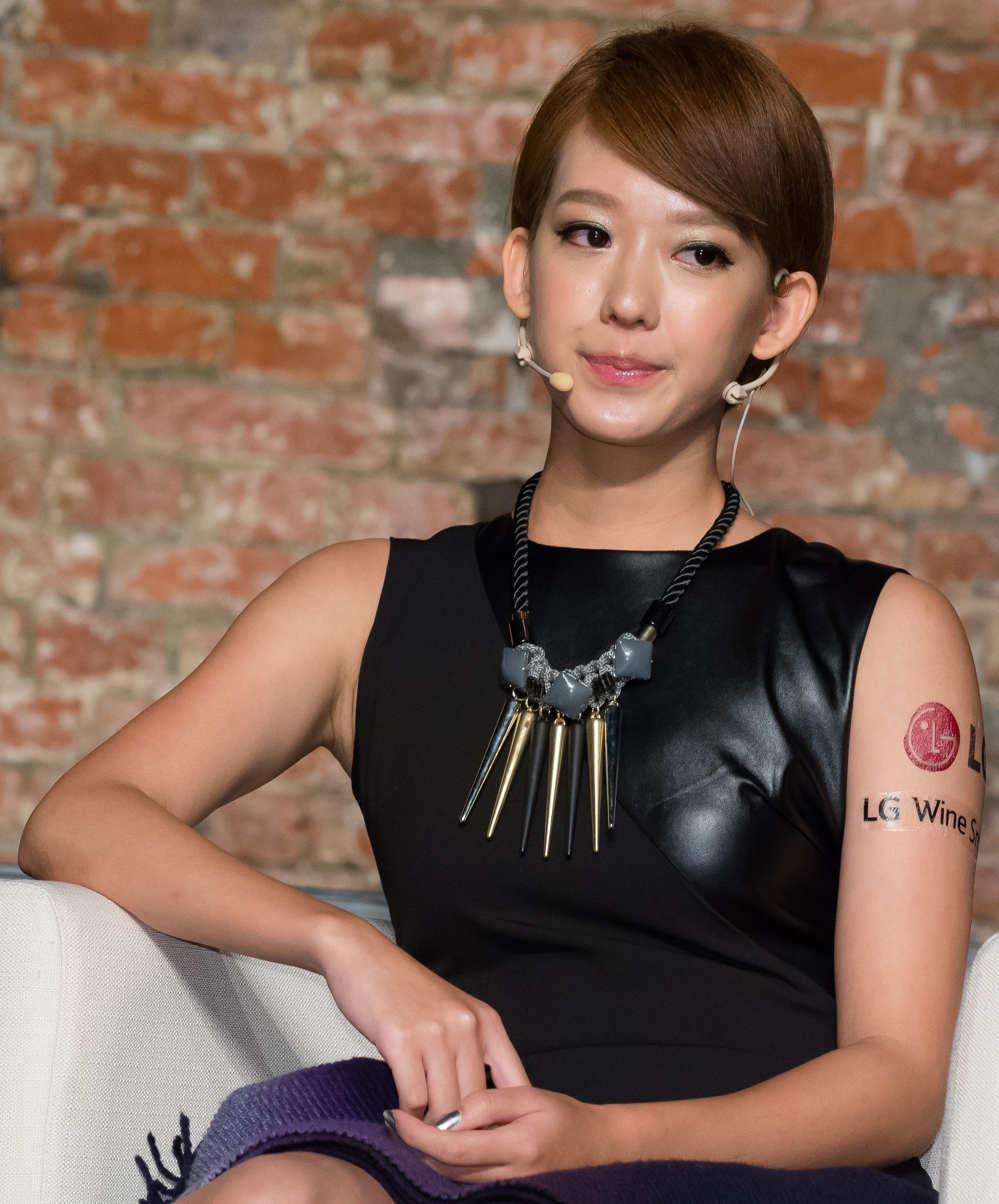
- Meng in November 2014
- Born: 20 July 1991 (age 35); Taipei, Taiwan
- Education: Shih Chien University
- Occupation: Actress
- Years active: 2007—present
- Spouse: Mickey Huang (m. 2020; div. 2025)
- Musical career
- Also known as: Meng Keng-ju; Meng Gengru

Summer Meng (Chinese: 孟耿如; pinyin: Mèng Gěngrú; born 20 July 1991) is a Taiwanese actress known for her roles in television series such as Sweet Sweet Bodyguard (2012), Aim High (2014), and Love, Timeless (2017). She got nominated for Best Actress at the 53rd Golden Bell Awards, Taiwan's most prestigious television awards, for her role in Wake Up 2.

== Personal life ==
Before becoming an actress, she studied dancing. She dated television host Mickey Huang starting in 2014 before they registered their marriage on March 5, 2020. Although she expressed support for him on their family life, the couple silently divorced due to criticism on social media regarding to Huang’s ongoing sex scandal, ending five years of marriage.

== Filmography ==
=== Television series ===
Year	English title	Mandarin title	Role	Notes
2007	They Kiss Again	惡作劇2吻	Lin Hao-mei (teenage)	
2009	Momo Love	桃花小妹	Young Chao Ko-jou	Cameo
2010	Gloomy Salad Days	死神少女	Chen Hsiao-ching	Episode 1-2
2011	In Time with You	我可能不會愛你	Lee Tao-tao	
2012	Sweet Sweet Bodyguard	剩女保鏢	Chen Ai-jia	
2013	A Hint of You	美味的想念	Tsai-yu's friend	Cameo
2014	You Light Up My Star	你照亮我星球	Yuan Yi-fang / Chen Yun-ju	
2014	Aim High	22K夢想高飛	Hsu Yi-fen	
2016	Rock Records in Love - Wishing Me Happy	滾石愛情故事-祝我幸福	Hsiao Wen-ni	
2016	Golden Darling	原來1家人	Nieh Wen-niang	Cameo
2016	Memory	火車情人	Chao Chien-hui	
2017	Love, Timeless	鐘樓愛人	Chao Kai-chia	
2017	Wake Up 2	麻醉風暴2	Shen Jou-yi (Zoe)	
2018	Single Ladies Senior	高塔公主	Wang Mi Na	

=== Film ===
Year	English title	Original title	Role	Notes
2011	Shore Fishing	阿銘岸邊釣魚	Hsiao Chun	Television
2012	Come for You	為你而來	Volunteer	Cameo
2013	To My Dear Granny	親愛的奶奶	Hsiao Ju	
2013	Hot Line 1999	熱線1999	Social worker	Short film
2013	Missed Calls	爸爸的未接來電	Chiao Chiao	Short film
2013	Dear Mom	忘了說謝謝		Short film
2014	Un Sospiro Enchanted	傾琴記		Short film
2014	The Future Day	來日	Anna / May	Short film
2013	27°C - Loaf Rocks	世界第一麥方	Chen Hsin-mei	
2015	Koisuru Vampire	恋する・ヴァンパイア	Miki	
2016	Kill Me	殺了我	Chen Lin	Web film
2018	My Turtle Honey Girlfriend	我的龜蜜女友	Hsiao Lü	TV film
2018	Single Day			
2018	Samsara	無界限	Chang Lan-jo	
2020	The Bridge Curse	女鬼橋	Lian Shu Yu	

=== Music video appearances ===
Year	Artist	Song title
2008	Jay Chou	"Lanting Xu"
2008	S.H.E	"Coastal Road Exit"
2010	JJ Lin	"Eyes That Smile"
2012	19 (Chen Chien-chi and Sandee Chan)	"Man and Woman"
2015	Evan Yo	"The Fake Lovers"
2006	JJ Lin	"Cao Cao"
2016	GBOYSWAG (Magic Power)	"Pray for Love"

== Awards and nominations ==
Year	Award	Category	Nominated work	Result
2018	53rd Golden Bell Awards	Best Leading Actress in a Television Series	Wake Up 2	Nominated
