= Tony Yang =

Tony Yang may refer to:

- Tony Yike Yang (born 1998), Chinese-Canadian pianist
- Tony Yang (actor) (fl. 2000s–2020s), Taiwanese actor
- Tony Yang (businessman) (born 1970), Philippines-based Chinese businessman
- Tony Yang (film producer) (fl. 2020s), American film producer
- Y. Tony Yang (fl. 2000s–2020s), American health policy scholar
