= Chang Hsin-yan =

Taiwanese actress

- Born: 18 April 1982 (age 43); Shilin, Taipei, Taiwan
- Occupation: actress

Chinese name
- Traditional Chinese: 張心妍
- Simplified Chinese: 张心妍
Transcriptions
Standard Mandarin
- Hanyu Pinyin: Zhāng Xīnyán

Chang Hsin-yan (Chinese: 張心妍; pinyin: Zhāng Xīnyán) is a Taiwanese actress.

== Filmography ==
=== Film ===
Year	English title	Original title	Role	Notes
2008	Cape No. 7	海角七號	Meiling	
2011	Mr. Bedman	彈簧床先生	Chia-yin	
2024	My Teacher	我的老師首部曲：燈塔水母的秘密		Web film

=== Television ===
Year	English title	Original title	Role	Notes
2003	Twilight Garden	莒光園地		Anthology
2006	Hala Godfather	哈拉教父	Chun-pei	
2006	Goku Dou High School	極道學園	Han Ning	
2006	Strange Tales	驚異傳奇	Mrs. Gao	Anthology
2009	My Queen	敗犬女王	Chloe	
2010	Because of You	星光下的童話	Tang Hsiao-chi	
2013	Fabulous Boys	原來是美男	Kei Ti	
2013	Two Fathers	兩個爸爸	Teacher Chang	
2013	K Song Lover	K歌·情人·夢	Masseuse	
2014	The X-Dormitory	終極X宿舍	Chiao-chiao	
2018	Befriend	人際關係事務所	Ko Yu-hsin	
2020	Mother to be	未來媽媽	Sister Ai	
