= David Loman =

2013 Taiwanese film by Chiu Li-kwan

- Theatrical release poster
- Directed by: Chiu Li-kwan
- Written by: Chiu Li-kwan
- Produced by: Chiu Li-kwan; Chung-Hsien Yang; Heman Peng; Yen-Ping Chu
- Starring: Amber Kuo; Tony Yang
- Cinematography: Kenny Lam
- Edited by: Chen Po-wen
- Music by: Baby Chung
- Production companies: Polyface Films; Vision Film Production
- Distributed by: Warner Bros. Pictures
- Release date: February 1, 2013 (Taiwan)
- Running time: 97 minutes
- Country: Taiwan
- Box office: NT$428 million (Taiwan)

David Loman (大尾鱸鰻) is a 2013 Taiwanese comedy film directed by Chiu Li-kwan.

== Cast ==
- Chu Ke-liang
- Amber Kuo
- Tony Yang
- Lin Mei-hsiu
- Miao Ke-li as Nana
- Ma Nien-hsien as Toad

== Reception ==
It was the 3rd highest-grossing film of 2013 in Taiwan, with NT$428 million.

Film Business Asia's Derek Elley gave the film a rating of 6 out of 10.

A sequel, David Loman 2, was released on February 5, 2016. Aboriginals in Taiwan accused the film of bigotry.
