= Love, Timeless =

2017 Taiwanese television series

- Promotional poster
- 鐘樓愛人
- Genre: Romance, Fantasy, Time travel, Youth
- Created by: Eastern Television
- Written by: Neko Hsu 許芸齊; Wu De Zhi 烏得紙
- Directed by: Eri Hao 郝心翔
- Starring: Nick Chou; Summer Meng; Huang Wei Ting 黃薇渟; Chang Chieh 張捷
- Opening theme: Can’t Let Go 不放 by Nick Chou
- Ending theme: 1064°C by Jocelyn Chan 陳明憙
- Country of origin: Taiwan
- Original language: Mandarin
- No. of episodes: 15

Production
- Producer: Luo Zhi Yu 羅智育
- Production location: Taiwan
- Running time: 115 minutes (Ep. 1); 90 minutes (Ep. 2-14); 95 minutes (Ep. 15)
- Production company: Deepwaters Digital Support Inc. 大川大立數位影音股份有限公司

Original release
- Network: TTV; EBC Variety
- Release: 15 April – 29 July 2017

Related
- The King of Romance; Jojo's World

Love, Timeless (Chinese: 鐘樓愛人; pinyin: zhōnglóu àirén; literally "Lovers of the Clock Tower") is a 2017 Taiwanese television series created and produced by Eastern Television. Starring Nick Chou, Summer Meng, Huang Wei Ting and Chang Chieh as the main cast. Filming began on February 24, 2017 and wrapped up on June 17, 2017. First original broadcast on TTV every Saturday at 10:00 pm starting April 15, 2017.

== Synopsis ==
Life seems to be one misstep after another for 30 year-old Shi Zhao Yu (Nick Chou) ever since he lost that fateful basketball match to his college rival Li Jun Ren (Chang Chieh). He lost to him in love back in college, now he's about to lose his job. Life is no easier for his former classmate Ruby Shen (Huang Wei Ting). The girl of every guy's dream in college is now trapped in a failed marriage. Feeling depressed, Ruby calls her former classmates to meet at the clock tower, where they once shared happy memories together in college. "If only I could go back in time, maybe my life would have been different." says Ruby before she jumps off the clock tower. Just as Zhao Yu falls from trying to save Ruby, he is transported back in time to his sophomore year in college. Zhao Yu now has a chance. The opportunity to save his first love and reverse the future is in our hero's grasp. But what does he really want: another shot with his college crush, or a love that he didn't even know existed before?

== Cast ==
=== Main cast ===
- Nick Chou as Shi Zhao Yu 時兆宇
- Summer Meng as Zhao Kai Jia 趙凱佳
- Huang Wei Ting 黃薇渟 as Shen Ruo Bi 沈若比 (Ruby)
- Chang Chieh 張捷 as Li Jun Ren 李駿任

=== Supporting cast ===
- Johnny Yang 楊銘威 as Liao Hai Meng 廖海盟
- Lan Ya Yun 藍雅芸 as Wang Zhi Ni 王致妮
- Lo Pei-An 羅北安 as Shi Can Zhi 時燦治
- Miao Ke-li as Zhou Mei Guang

=== Special appearances ===
- Lang Tsu-yun 郎祖筠 as You Xin Ying 尤欣穎
- Jackson Lou 樓學賢 as Li Tai Yuan 李泰元
- Debbie Chou 周丹薇 as Qiu Xuan Ai 邱萱愛
- Lin Xiu Jun 林秀君 as Wen Xiu Mei 溫秀美
- Louis Lin 林健寰 as Shen Jian De 沈建德
- Joseph Ma 馬國賢 as General manager Xia 夏總
- Ryan Kuo 郭鑫 as Bai Pin Ren 白品仁
- Gao Kai Li 高凱莉 as Zhang Wei Yuan (Wei Wei) 張瑋媛 (瑋瑋)
- Andy Wu 吳岳擎 as Li Ying Zhu 李英祝
- Li Zheng Da 勵政達 as Zhang Da Qi 張大器
- Zhu Jun Xian 朱俊憲 as Bo Ren 博仁
- Lin Shuai Fu 林帥甫 as Long Zhu 龍珠
- Lan Qi Rui 藍啟瑞 as basketball coach
- Guo Bai Jie 郭柏傑 as Jin Mao 金毛
- Jocelyn Chan 陳明憙
- Luo Si Qi 羅思琦 as Zhao Xiong San 趙雄三
- ?? as Bing Zhong 秉中
- Huang Yu-Chen 黃妤榛 as host

== Soundtrack ==
- Can't Let Go 不放 by Nick Chou 周湯豪
- 1064 °C by Jocelyn Chan 陳明憙
- Caged Bird 囚鳥 by Jocelyn Chan 陳明憙
- Final Solace 最後安慰 by Jocelyn Chan 陳明憙
- I Say Baby by Nick Chou 周湯豪
- Lover 情人 by Kelly Poon 潘嘉麗
- Could Still Embrace 還能擁抱 by Kelly Poon 潘嘉麗
- My Turn to Love 換我愛你 by Derrick Hoh 何維健

== Broadcast ==
Network	Country	Airing Date	Timeslot
TTV	Taiwan	April 15, 2017	Saturday 10:00-11:30 pm
EBC Variety	Taiwan	April 16, 2017	Sunday 10:00-11:30 pm
Astro Shuang Xing	Malaysia	October 3, 2017	Monday to Friday 4:00-5:00 pm
UNTV	Philippines	This 2021	TBA

== Episode ratings ==
Competing shows on rival channels airing at the same time slot were:

- CTS – Genius Go Go Go
- FTV – Just Dance
- CTV – Mr. Player
- PTS – Family Time, Lion Dance
- EBC Variety – The Perfect Match
- GTV – Q series: Boy Named Flora

Air Date	Episode	Average Ratings	Rank
Apr 15, 2017	1	0.59	5
Apr 22, 2017	2	0.52	5
Apr 29, 2017	3	0.69	5
May 6, 2017	4	0.49	5
May 13, 2017	5	0.50	4
May 20, 2017	6	0.52	6
May 27, 2017	7	0.44	6
Jun 3, 2017	8	0.68	6
Jun 10, 2017	9	0.38	6
Jun 17, 2017	10	0.67	6
Jun 24, 2017: Airing of "28th Golden Melody Awards"
Jul 1, 2017	11	0.61	5
Jul 8, 2017	12	0.68	5
Jul 15, 2017	13	0.49	5
Jul 22, 2017	14	0.59	5
Jul 29, 2017	15	0.77	4
Average ratings		0.57	--
