= The Treasure (2017 film) =

Unreleased Hong Kong film by Ronald Cheng and Gordon Chan

- Poster
- Directed by: Ronald Cheng; Gordon Chan
- Written by: Ronald Cheng; Gordon Chan
- Produced by: Paul Cheng; Chung Kai-Cheung
- Starring: Ronald Cheng; Dayo Wong; Fala Chen; Sharon Hsu; Sam Lee; Michael Wong
- Cinematography: Lai Yiu-fai
- Music by: Florian Linckus; Raymond Wong
- Production company: Bona Film Group
- Release date: 2017
- Countries: Hong Kong; China
- Languages: Cantonese; Mandarin

The Treasure (Chinese: 神秘寶藏) is a comedy period adventure film directed by Ronald Cheng and Gordon Chan, starring Ronald Cheng, Dayo Wong, Fala Chen and Sharon Hsu. The film is a Hong Kong-Chinese co-production, and is still unreleased to date.

== Cast ==
- Ronald Cheng
- Dayo Wong
- Fala Chen
- Sharon Hsu
- Sam Lee
- Michael Wong
