= Jojo's World =

2017 Taiwanese television series

- Promotional poster
- Also known as: When A Woman Chases A Man
- 我和我的四個男人
- Genre: Romantic comedy
- Created by: EBC
- Written by: sima 15@ Yu Yuan-yuan; Li Jie-yu
- Directed by: Liu En-jie
- Starring: Tia Lee; Jacob Hwang; Yen-j; Jason Hsu; Andy Wu; Sharon Hsu
- Opening theme: "Dilemma 兩難" by Fish Leong
- Ending theme: "Barely Friends 邊緣朋友" by Yen-j
- Country of origin: Taiwan
- Original language: Mandarin
- No. of episodes: 15+1

Production
- Producer: Wang Pei-hua
- Production location: Taiwan
- Running time: 75 minutes
- Production company: Good Whale Studio

Original release
- Network: TTV; EBC Variety
- Release: 5 August – 18 November 2017

Related
- Love, Timeless; Lion Pride

Jojo's World (simplified Chinese: 我和我的四个男人; traditional Chinese: 我和我的四個男人; pinyin: wǒ hé wǒ de sì ge nán rén; literally "Me and My Four Men"), also known as When A Woman Chases A Man, is a 2017 Taiwanese television series created and produced by EBC. It stars Tia Lee, Jacob Hwang, Yen-j, Jason Hsu, Andy Wu and Sharon Hsu as the main cast. Filming commenced in June 2017 and ended on 2 October 2017. It was first broadcast on 5 August 2017 on TTV and airs every Saturday night from 10pm to 11.30pm.

== Cast ==
=== Main cast ===
- Tia Lee 李毓芬 as Lin Chun-jiao 林春嬌 (Jojo)
- Jacob Hwang 黃仁德 as Yi Sheng 易盛 (Louis)
- Yen-j 嚴爵 as Tang Zai-qin 唐在勤
- Jason Hsu 許孟哲 as Li Bi-he 李必合
- Andy Wu 吳岳擎 as Zhang Xiao-shuo 張曉碩
- Sharon Hsu 許維恩 as Ding Shu-qi 丁書琪

=== Supporting cast ===
- Lotus Wang 王彩樺 as Jiang Shu-fen 江淑芬
- Ma Nien-hsien 馬念先 as Ma Ke-wang 馬可王
- Michael Hsu 徐崧育 as Jiang Xin-xing 江心星
- Ma Yun-ting 馬韻婷 as Xuan Xuan 宣宣
- Huang Yu-ting 黃郁婷 as Vivi
- Xiang Nai-er 香奈兒 as Song Hui-en 宋慧恩
- Kenny Kuo 岱毅 as Xiao Wu 小伍
- Yang Zhen 楊震 as Ah Pang 阿胖

=== Guest actors ===
- Chen Bor-jeng 陳博正 as temple caretaker
- Twinkling Ting 謝金晶 as Xie Jin Jing 謝金晶
- Riva Chang 張可昀 as Zhang Ke Yun 張可昀
- Chan Wei-chung 詹惟中 as vice president
- Honduras 洪都拉斯 as Chef Ah Wen 阿溫師
- Liao Bai Xiang 廖柏翔 as Xiao Wen 小溫
- Eunice Lin 林彥君 as Ke Ke 可可
- Tang Qi 唐琪 as Yi Sheng's grandma
- Reina Ikehata 池端玲名 as Lina

== Soundtrack ==
- Dilemma 兩難 by Fish Leong 梁静茹
- Barely Friends 邊緣朋友 by Yen-j 嚴爵
- I am Water 我是水 by Yen-j 嚴爵
- I Like (No, I Love) 我喜歡（不，我愛）by Yen-j 嚴爵
- Beginning of the End 終於結束的起點 by Mayday 五月天
- Love Today by Yen-j 嚴爵 & Xiang Nai-er 香奈兒

== Broadcast ==
Network	Country	Airing Date	Timeslot
TTV	Taiwan	August 5, 2017	Saturday 10:00-11:30 pm
LINE TV	Taiwan	August 5, 2017	Saturday 11:30 pm
EBC Variety	Taiwan	August 6, 2017	Sunday 10:00-11:30 pm
iQiyi	Taiwan	August 6, 2017	Sunday 10:00 pm
KKTV	Taiwan	August 6, 2017	Sunday 11:30 pm
CHOCO TV	Taiwan	August 7, 2017	Monday 12:00 pm
Astro Shuang Xing	Malaysia	November 27, 2017	Monday to Friday 4:00-5:00 pm
UNTV	Philippines	This 2021	TBA

== Ratings ==
Competing programmes on rival channels airing at the same time slot were:

- SET Metro - Memory Love
- CTS - Genius Go Go Go
- FTV - Just Dance
- CTV - Mr. Player
- PTS - Days We Stared at the Sun II, Wake Up 2

Air Date	Episode	Average Ratings	Rank
Aug 5, 2017	1	0.70	4
Aug 12, 2017	2	0.62	4
Aug 19, 2017	3	0.68	4
Aug 26, 2017	4	0.49	4
Sep 2, 2017	5	0.46	4
Sep 9, 2017	6	0.59	5
Sep 16, 2017	7	0.42	5
Sep 23, 2017	8	--	--
Sep 30, 2017	9	0.56	5
Oct 7, 2017	10	0.58	5
Oct 14, 2017	11	0.84	5
Oct 21, 2017	12	0.63	5
Oct 28, 2017	13	0.71	5
Nov 4, 2017	14	--	4
Nov 11, 2017	15	0.68	4
Nov 18, 2017	Special Episode		
Average ratings		0.61^{1}	--

^Note 1: The average rating calculation does not include special episode.
