= Ma Nien-hsien =

Taiwanese singer-songwriter and actor (born 1973)

- 馬念先
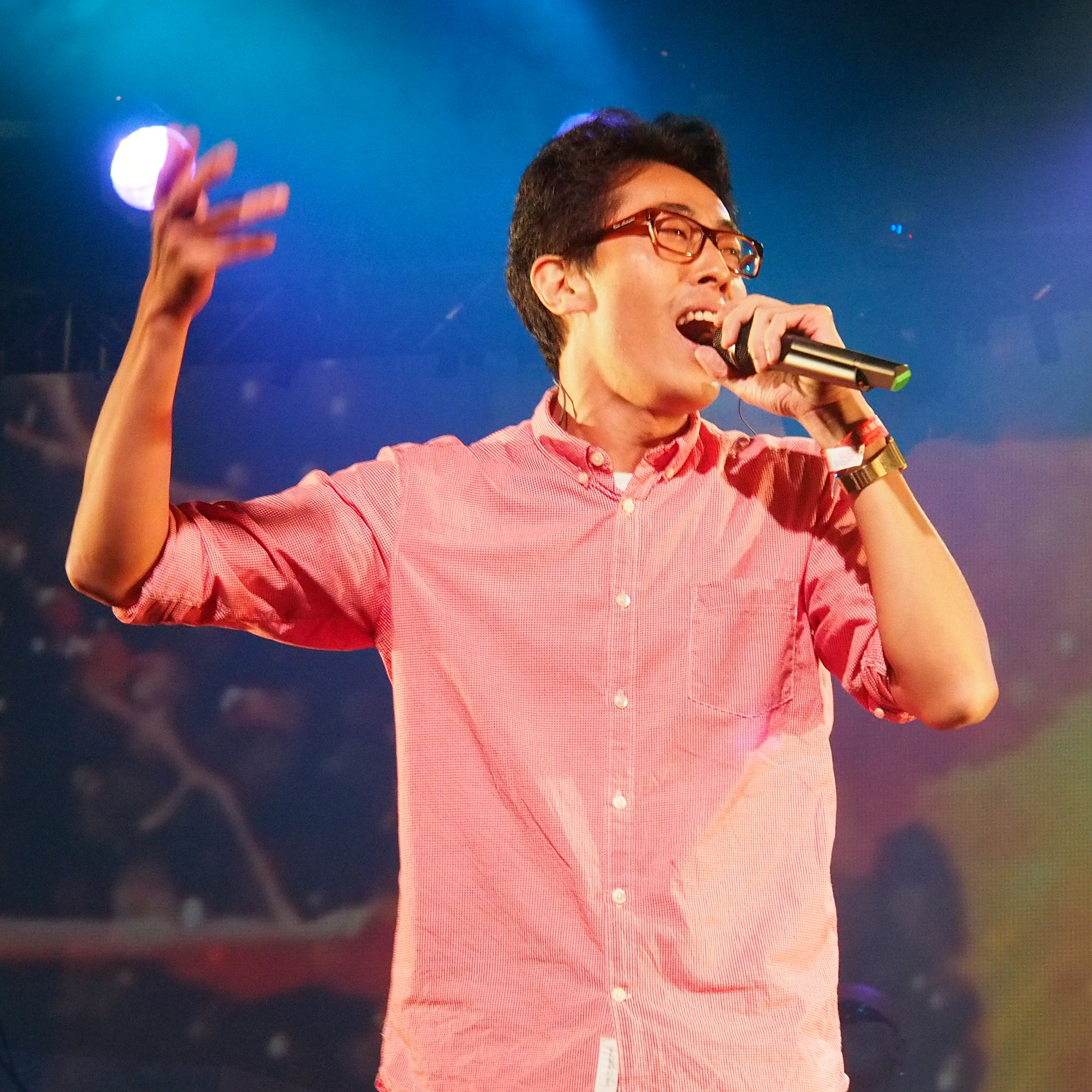
- Ma in December 2012
- Born: 1973 (age 52–53); Taipei, Taiwan
- Education: Tamkang University (BA)
- Occupations: Singer-songwriter; Actor
- Years active: 1997–present
- Parent: Ma Jing-xian (father)

Ma Nien-hsien (Chinese: 馬念先; born 1973) is a Taiwanese singer-songwriter and actor. Debuting as a member of funk rock band Sticky Rice in 1997, Ma rose to fame in Asia with the band's second album The Bird King. He later pursued careers in music and acting, achieving recognition for his role as Malasun in the musical drama film Cape No. 7 (2008). He then starred in Rock N' Road (2014), All You Need Is Love (2015), Jojo's World (2017), The Victims' Game (2020) and More Than Blue: The Series (2021). Ma received nominations for Best Original Film Song and Best Male Mandarin Singer for his film score composition in the comedy film Zone Pro Site (2013) and his debut album Mama Jeans and Daddy Shoes in the 50th Golden Horse Awards and 33rd Golden Melody Awards, respectively. He also took on the lead role as Chang Yung-kang in the comedy film Marry My Dead Body (2023) and reprised it in the spinoff series GG Precinct (2024).

== Early life and education ==
Ma was born in 1973 in Taipei, Taiwan. His father, Ma Jing-xian, is a children's literature writer and a music lover who often played classic songs at home, influencing Ma's musical taste. Ma was mischievous during his school days and was once expelled from high school. He developed an interest in music after purchasing a guitar and eventually became the chairman of the western music club in high school. He then attended Tamkang University to study mass communications and later graduated with a Bachelor of Arts. He actively participated in bands and music performances from his first year.

== Career ==
In 1994, Ma and three university friends formed a funk rock band called Sticky Rice and began performing in pubs. They wrote an original song and applied for a competition hosted by PolyGram. PolyGram signed them on the spot, and Sticky Rice released their debut song "Star's Dream" and their first album, also titled Sticky Rice, in 1997. The band also sang the theme song for the 1997 romance film Love Go Go, earning a nomination for Best Original Film Song in the 34th Golden Horse Awards. In 2000, they released another album called The Bird King, featuring "Paris Strawberry" and "Taekwondo", which became popular in Taiwan and Hong Kong. In 2004, due to the outbreak of SARS and a lack of job offers, the other members of the band decided to leave the entertainment industry and pursue stable careers. However, Ma chose to remain in the music industry and started composing music for advertisements.

In 2008, director Wei Te-sheng approached Ma to join his new film project Cape No. 7. Ma initially thought Wei wanted him to compose the film score, but to his surprise, Wei offered him a supporting lead role. Ma accepted the offer and starred as Malasun, a Hakka alcohol salesman, which brought him widespread recognition in Taiwan due to his iconic performance and the film's popularity. Ma subsequently received numerous film role offers and made his television debut in the same year, portraying Feng Pai-hsiung in Time Story. In 2011, Ma was approached by his high school classmate and assistant director, Lishu Lin, to star in a leading role in The Killer Who Never Kills. He also composed music for the 2013 comedy film Zone Pro Site, which earned him a nomination for Best Original Film Song in the 50th Golden Horse Awards. Ma continued to star in various films and television series in recurring roles, including the 2013 comedy film David Loman, the 2014 romantic musical series Rock N' Road, and the 2017 romantic comedy series Jojo's World. He also took on a leading role in the 2015 romantic comedy film All You Need Is Love. In 2020, Ma appeared as police detective Chen Yao-hui in The Victims' Game, and took on a recurring role as Mr. Chi in the 2021 romance series More Than Blue: The Series. That same year, he released his first individual music album, Mama Jeans and Daddy Shoes, and received a nomination for Best Male Mandarin Singer in the 33rd Golden Melody Awards. In 2023, Ma starred in the lead role as police captain Chang Yung-kang, who is mistakenly perceived as a mole, in the supernatural comedy film Marry My Dead Body. His performance was positively received, and he reprised the role in the spin-off series GG Precinct.

== Filmography ==
=== Film ===
Year	Title	Role	Notes
2008	Cape No. 7	Malasun (馬拉桑)	
2011	The Killer Who Never Kills	Ceng Quede (曾闕德)	
2013	David Loman	Toad	
2013	Zone Pro Site	Taxi driver	Cameo; deleted scene
2014	Sweet Alibis	Huo-lung (火隆)	
2014	Café. Waiting. Love	Customer	Cameo
2015	All You Need Is Love	Ma Nien-hsien (馬念先)	
2017	52Hz, I Love You	Band Member	
2017	The Village of No Return	Trumpeter	Cameo
2021	Your Name Engraved Herein	Old Chang Yi-chuen (張逸群)	
2023	Marry My Dead Body	Chang Yung-kang (張永康)	
2024	The Lyricist Wannabe	Kao (高經理)	Cameo

=== Television ===
Year	Title	Role	Notes
2008	Time Story	Feng Pai-Hsiung (馮拍雄)	Main role
2009	Happy Together	Zhao Ding-yi (趙定一)	Main role
2010	Rogue Principal	Ke Pu-ti (柯菩提)	Recurring role
2012	Once Upon a Love	Chen Yao-ming (陳耀明)	Recurring role
2013	Falling	Liu Li-tsi (劉立智)	Recurring role
2013	K Song Lover	Guo Min-hsiung (郭閔熊)	Main role
2014	Rock N' Road	Ma Ding Ni (馬丁尼)	Recurring role
2014	Mr. Right Wanted	Paul	Cameo
2016	A Good Day	Wen Guang-de (溫廣德)	Recurring role
2017	Jojo's World	Ma Ke-wang (馬可王)	Recurring role
2018	Great Times	Yu An-miao (游安妙)	Recurring role
2020–2024	The Victims' Game	Chen Yao-hui (陳耀輝)	Recurring role (season 1–2)
2020	Wacko At Law	Bai Chong-guang (白重光)	Recurring role
2021	Danger Zone	Qiao Weilin (喬衛林)	Recurring role
2021	More Than Blue: The Series	Mr. Chi (吉哥)	Recurring role
2021	Light the Night	Tsai Huo-wang (蔡火旺)	Special appearance (season 1–3)
2024	GG Precinct	Chang Yung-kang	Main role

== Awards and nominations ==
Year	Award	Category	Work	Result	Ref.
2013	50th Golden Horse Awards	Best Original Film Song	Zone Pro Site	Nominated	
2022	33rd Golden Melody Awards	Best Male Mandarin Singer	Mama Jeans and Daddy Shoes	Nominated	
