= Lang Tzu-yun =

Taiwanese actress

- 郎祖筠
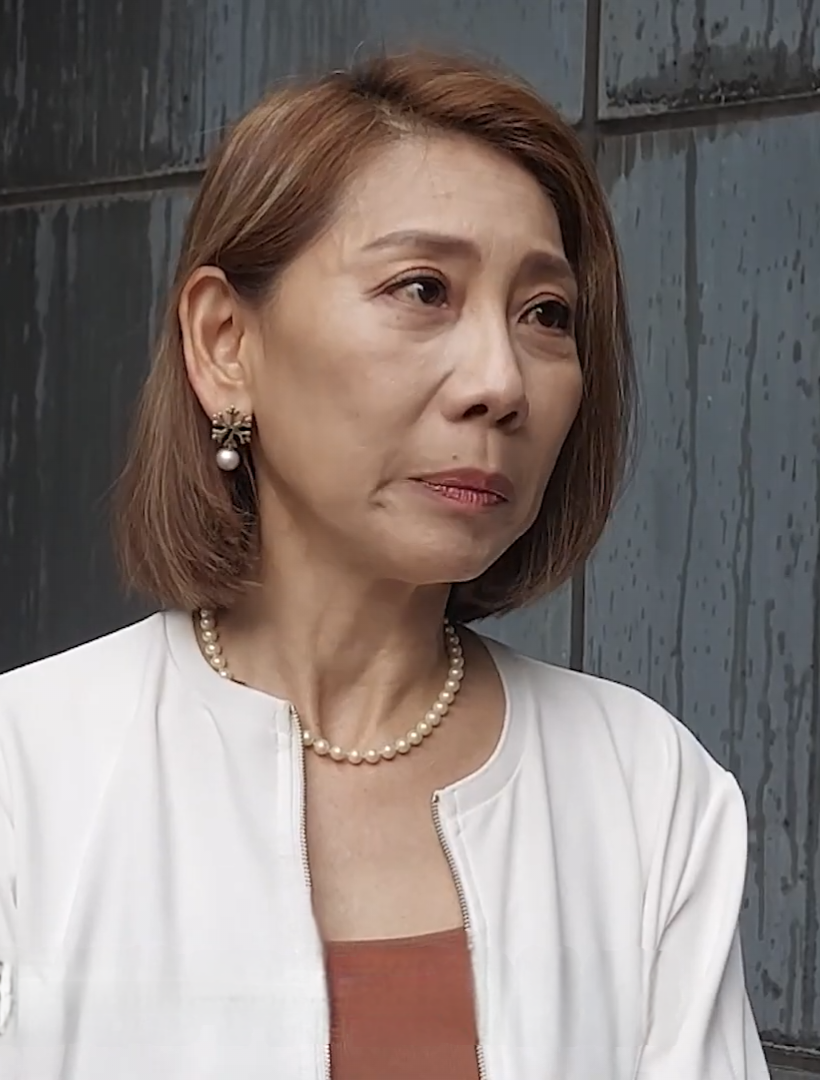
- Lang in 2023
- Pronunciation: Láng Zǔyún
- Born: 5 April 1965 (age 60)
- Occupation: Actress

Lang Tzu-yun (Chinese: 郎祖筠; pinyin: Láng Zǔyún; 5 April 1965) is a Taiwanese actress.

She was trained in the art of crosstalk by Wu Zhaonan, and founded the Spring Sun Performing Arts Troupe in 1999. The company disbanded in 2008.

In 2014, she was nominated for Best Supporting Actress at the 51st Golden Horse Awards for Sweet Alibis.

== Selected filmography ==
- The Candidate (1998)
- Xiaoguang (2000)
- Love in Disguise (2010)
- Office Girls (2011)
- Miss Rose (2012)
- Big Red Riding Hood (2013)
- Mr. Right Wanted (2014)
- Sweet Alibis (2014)
- Attention, Love! (2017)
- Love, Timeless (2017)
