= The Candidate (1998 film) =

1998 Taiwanese film directed by Neil Peng

- Traditional Chinese: 為人民服務
- Simplified Chinese: 为人民服务
- Literal meaning: Serve the People
- Hanyu Pinyin: Wèi Rénmín Fúwù
- Directed by: Neil Peng
- Written by: Neil Peng
- Produced by: Hsu Li-kong
- Starring: Neil Peng; Yu Mei-jen; Emi Lee; Lang Tsu-yun; Debby Yang
- Cinematography: Chen Ting-an
- Edited by: Chen Po-wen
- Production company: Zoom Hunt International Productions
- Release date: 1998
- Running time: 106 minutes
- Country: Taiwan
- Languages: Mandarin, with some Hokkien and English

The Candidate is a 1998 Taiwanese political satire mockumentary film directed and written by Neil Peng, starring himself as presidential candidate Hsu Giu Jing who campaigns for national vegetarianism. The film was shown at the 1999 Hawaii International Film Festival.

== Cast ==
- Neil Peng as Hsu Giu Jing
- Yu Mei-jen as Yu Mei-jen, Hsu Giu Jing's wife
- Lang Tsu-yun as Irene, Hsu Giu Jing's spokesperson
- Emi Lee as Yu An-an
- Debby Yang as Annie
- Chao Tzu-chiang as Vice President Li
- Shih Wei as Vice President Feng
- Lu Wei-lin as Male news reporter
- Yang Yu-wen as Female news reporter
- Huang Chih-hao as Wei
- Chin Andi as Mao
- Lan Ling as Zhen
- Chen Yaling as Mei
- Chien Te-men as Master Hsing Hsing
- Alyssa Chia as Hsu Giu Jing's mother
- Sun Da-wei as Hsu Chiu Jing's father
- Wang Yu-wen as Hsu Giu Jing's father's lover
- Wang Hao-wei as Chiang Kai-shek's physician

=== Special appearances ===
- Cheng Tsai-tung as Cheng Tsai-tung, painter
- Yee Chin-yen as Documentary director
- Sisy Chen as "Herself", Hsu Giu Jing's secret lover
- Chen Horng-chi as himself
- Cheng Li-wen as herself
- Pang Chien-kuo as himself
- Jaw Shaw-kong as himself
- Kevin Tsai as himself
- Poe Ta-chung as himself
- Susan Yeh as herself
- Ellen Huang as herself
- Winston Chao
- Danny Dun as man interviewed on the street
- Chien Wei-chuan as Basketball player
- Ang Lee as Hsu Giu Jing's childhood friend
