= The Bridge Curse =

- Directed by: Lester Hsi
- Written by: Chang Keng Min
- Produced by: Chang Keng Min; Chuang Chi Hsiang
- Starring: Summer Meng; J.C. Lin; Chang Ning; Vera Yan
- Edited by: Chen Chien-Chih
- Music by: Wen Tzu-Chieh
- Production companies: Lots Home Entertainment; Double Edge Entertainment; Pegasus Entertainment
- Release date: 27 February 2020
- Running time: 88 minutes
- Country: Taiwan
- Language: Mandarin

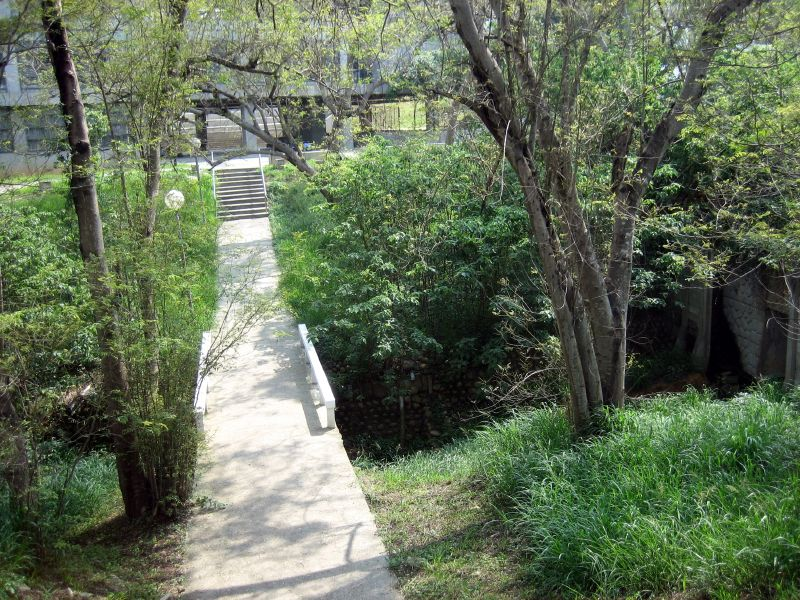
"The Bridge Curse" is adapted from the legendary story of the Ghost Lady Bridge at Tunghai University.

The Bridge Curse (Chinese: 女鬼橋) is a 2020 Taiwanese horror mystery thriller film directed by Lester Hsi, starring Summer Meng, J.C. Lin, Chang Ning and Vera Yan. It is based on the legend of the haunted bridge at Tunghai University.

The film received a video game adaptation, The Bridge Curse: Road to Salvation, which was released on Steam on 25 August 2022. The film received a sequel titled The Bridge Curse: Ritual. A sequel video game, titled The Bridge Curse 2 The Extrication, was released on Steam on 9 May 2024.

== Plot ==
The story revolves around a long-standing urban legend surrounding the "Female Ghost Bridge" at Tunghu University in Taiwan. Legend has it that a female student once waited on the bridge to elope with her boyfriend, but after he failed to show up, she was assaulted by five men and drowned in the lake. Since then, rumors persist that an extra step appears on the bridge's staircase at midnight, and anyone who looks back while climbing it will encounter her ghost. The film's narrative intertwines three different leap years—2012, 2016, and 2020—gradually revealing the rules of the curse, which dictates that the ghost must claim five victims every four years as replacements.

The tragedy begins in 2012 when a student, Chao Hsin-chiao, and her classmates hold a test of courage at the bridge. Hsin-chiao inadvertently removes a protective talisman, releasing the curse and causing her peers to die horribly one by one. To save herself, Hsin-chiao makes a pact with the ghost, promising to bring five new victims in the next leap year to take her place. Four years later, in 2016, the surviving Hsin-chiao becomes a student council member and organizes another test of courage, intending to sacrifice five people, including her ex-boyfriend Chi Te-chuan (Ah Chuan) and four underclassmen. Following a series of supernatural incidents and the deaths of his companions, Ah Chuan uncovers Hsin-chiao's plot. Faced with imminent death, Ah Chuan makes the same choice Hsin-chiao did: he kills Hsin-chiao to complete the five-victim sacrifice and promises the ghost that he will find new replacements in the next leap year.

In 2020, journalist Lien Shu-yu investigates the mysterious cold case of the 2016 student deaths, returning to the campus with cameraman Chi Wen-te for interviews and a reenactment. As the investigation deepens, Shu-yu pieces together the truth by comparing past video footage and realizes that six people were actually involved in the 2016 incident, though official records only list five deaths. Just as Shu-yu uncovers the truth, Wen-te removes his disguise, revealing himself as Ah Chuan, the sole survivor who inherited the curse. Ah Chuan ambushes Shu-yu, binding her and taping her mouth shut. He uses her investigation project to lure several unwitting extras to the bridge for the reenactment, seemingly to gather five new sacrifices for the current leap year. However, Ah Chuan later approaches the awakened Shu-yu from behind. Too terrified to turn around, Shu-yu keeps her back to him as Ah Chuan pleads for her help, revealing his true intention is to use her assistance to permanently break the deadly leap-year curse.

In a post-credits scene, a flashback to 2016 shows Hsin-chiao bleeding on the ground after Ah Chuan struck her in the head with a brick. A mysterious whisper echoes in the background: "It's your turn."

== Cast ==
- Summer Meng as the Reporter
- J.C. Lin as Chuan
- Chang Ning as Hsin-chiao
- Vera Yan as Sannu
- Ruby Zhan
- Ko Cheng
- Joe Hsieh

== Reception ==
Han Cheung of the Taipei Times wrote that while the film "has the right elements, ideas and technical capabilities", and the final twist "definitely will get people talking", it "needs better structuring" and "could be much scarier".

Douglas Tseng of today rated the film 3 stars out of 5 and wrote that "a late-game revelation helps make this otherwise routine shriek-fest slightly more interesting than it deserves to be."

Brian Costello of Common Sense Media rated the film 2 stars out of 5 and called it "unoriginal".
