= Yen-j =

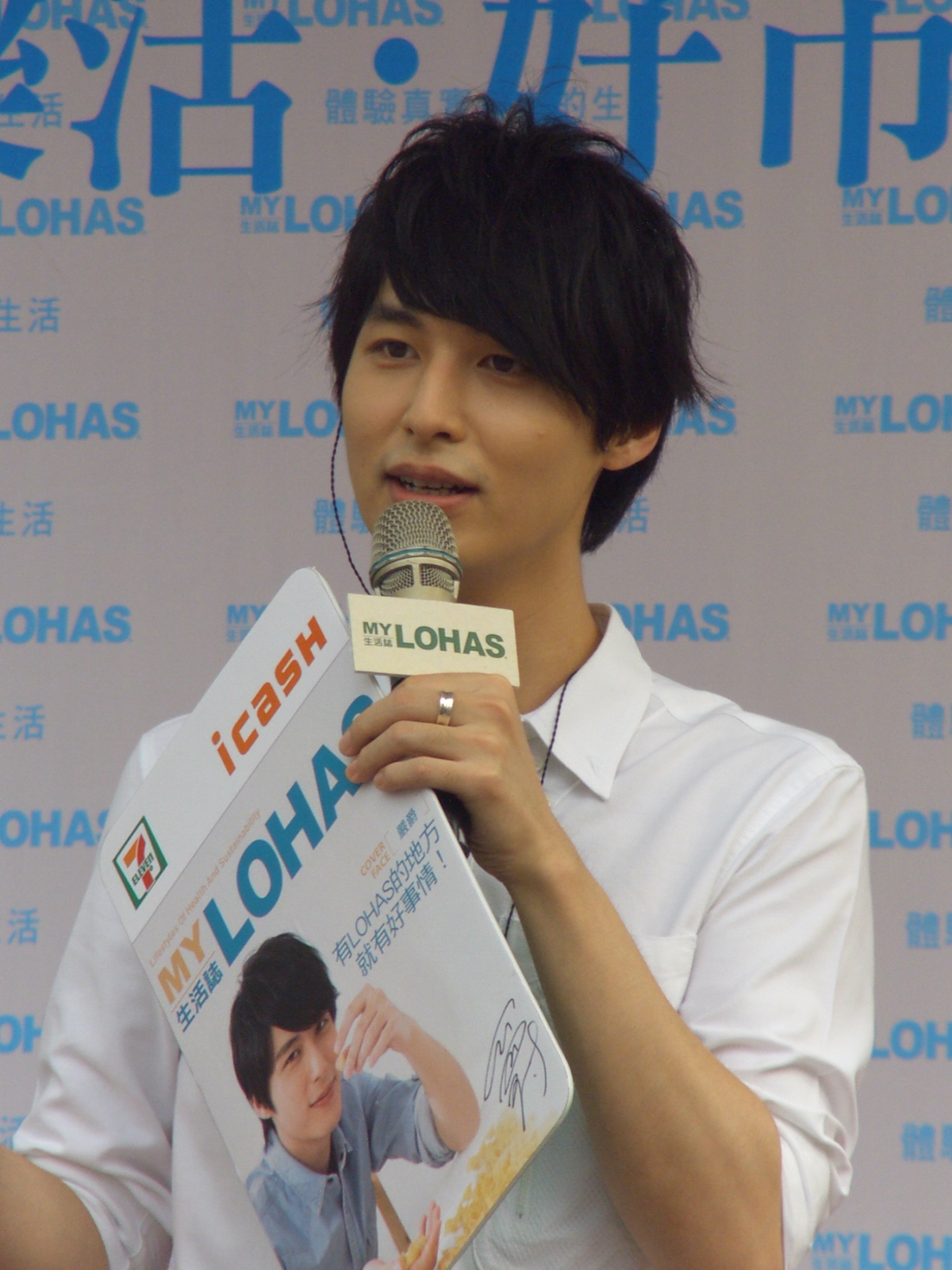
- Yen-j in 2011
- Born: 23 April 1988 (age 38); Kaohsiung, Taiwan
- Occupations: Singer-songwriter, actor
- Years active: 2009–present

Chinese name
- Traditional Chinese: 嚴爵
Transcriptions
Standard Mandarin
- Hanyu Pinyin: Yán Jué
Hakka
- Pha̍k-fa-sṳ: Nyâm Tsiok
Yue: Cantonese
- Jyutping: Jim4 zoek3
Southern Min
- Hokkien POJ: Giâm Chiok
- Musical career
- Origin: Taiwanese
- Genre: Mandopop
- Instruments: Voice, piano, trombone, guitar, bass, drums
- Labels: Warner Music Taiwan; B'in Music

Yen-j (Chinese: 嚴爵; pinyin: Yán jué; Pe̍h-ōe-jī: Giâm Chiok; born 23 April 1988) is a Taiwanese jazz-pop singer-songwriter and actor. He has achieved rising success as a newcomer on the Mandopop scene, due to testimonials from well-known artists such as Wang Leehom, Mayday's Ashin, Dee Hsu, Darkie Chen and DJ Tai Mai Shu. His fresh combinations of jazz and pop have made him a noticeable star on the rise. His debut album, Thanks to Your Greatness (谢谢你的美好) contains 11 songs, all written, and produced by him, or with his input. He also plays many instruments, such as the piano, trombone, guitar and bass guitar.

== Early life ==
Yen-j was born on 23 April 1988 in Kaohsiung, Taiwan. He moved to the United States at the age of 10 to continue his studies. He started playing the piano and the trombone at an early age. At the age of 11, he started composing his own music and learned to play other jazz instruments. During his high school years, he performed with his high school teachers at jazz bars in San Francisco. After high school, he moved to Los Angeles, where he studied music at the University of Southern California. However, he withdrew from the university after his first semester and moved back to Taiwan to begin his career as a singer.

Yen-j who comes from a family of doctors, was given a deadline of two years to start off his music career by his father, who wanted him to study medicine. Seeing how successful he has been since his decision to become a singer, his father has since changed the deadline to ten years, instead of two.

He is known for being greatly influenced by past loves and stated that all the songs from his first album 謝謝你的美好 (Thanks for Your Greatness) were written for his ex-girlfriend, with another ex-girlfriend being the inspiration for his third album 單細胞.

== Music career ==
After only three months, he was able to land a contract with a recording company in 2008, with Taiwan's Bin music. In January 2010, he released an EP, Trapped in Taipei (困在台北, Kùn Zài Táiběi) and went on various live gigs around Taiwan to be able to get used to performing by himself, and to raise audience awareness. Yen-J states that learning how to perform live was not enjoyable in the beginning as he was only learning the ropes, but he gradually learned to enjoy performing live and interacting with the audience.

His 2010 album, Thanks to your Greatness (謝謝你的美好, Xièxiè Nǐ De Měihǎo) was released on 29 April. It peaked at number 2 on the G-Music's Mandarin album charts a month after its release. He has been nominated for a number of awards in prestigious awards ceremonies such as the Golden Melody Awards as "Best Newcomer" and also the Singapore Hit awards, where he was nominated for and won the Best Newcomer Award. His 2011 single, "Good Things" (好的事情, Hǎo De Shìqíng) has reached No. 1 on the KKBOX Charts in Taiwan.

Yen-j has also received much interest towards his music from providing songs for some drama soundtracks, such as Queen Of No Marriage (敗犬女王), P.S Man (偷心大聖PS男) as well as the popular Autumn's Concerto (下一站,幸福), which featured some of his songs, such as "拓也的秘密心願 – 我以為" (I Presumed – secret version) and "相遇就不放手" (Not Letting Go).

His idols include Wang Leehom, Khalil Fong, Jay Chou and Stevie Wonder, who he hopes to be able to sound like in 5 years' time. He has shown himself to be a hardworking artist, with him re-recording some tracks in his album many times to get the best result for his album. At the present time, he has said in an interview that he has already presented his record company with songs for his second album. His 2nd album, Good Things (好的事情, Hǎo De Shìqíng) was released on 27 May 2011. Prior to the album release, Yen-j also released a duet with Rene Liu, "Méiyǒu xuánlǜ pèi de shàng nǐ" (沒有旋律配得上你) for the television drama Mr and Mrs single (隱婚男女).

In 2012/2013 he established his own production company named "爵隊制作"(Team Yen-J Productions) with the help of long-time friend and American drummer Tim Carr most notably. His production team and himself were the main producers, arrangers and instrumentalists behind his 2013 album "Love x Pi"(好的情人). This album and his first single of the same name were based on the success of his previous single <好的事情>(Good things) and reached number one on the KKBOX Charts.

== Discography ==
Albums:

- (2010-04) Thanks Your Greatness (謝謝你的美好)
- (2011-05) Not Alone (不孤獨)
- (2012-10) Simple Love (單細胞)
- (2013-06) Y4You (好的情人)
- (2015-04) Thanksgiving (一直給)
- (2015-09) WHY?ART (現代藝術)

Instrumental albums:

- (2020-10) C-lofi 1
- (2020-11) C-lofi 2
- (2021-01) C-lofi 3
- (2022-06) Cali4Nia

== Filmography ==
=== Television series ===
Year	English title	Original title	Role	Notes
2017	Jojo's World	我和我的四個男	Tang Zai-qin	
