= Tony Yang (actor) =

Taiwanese actor

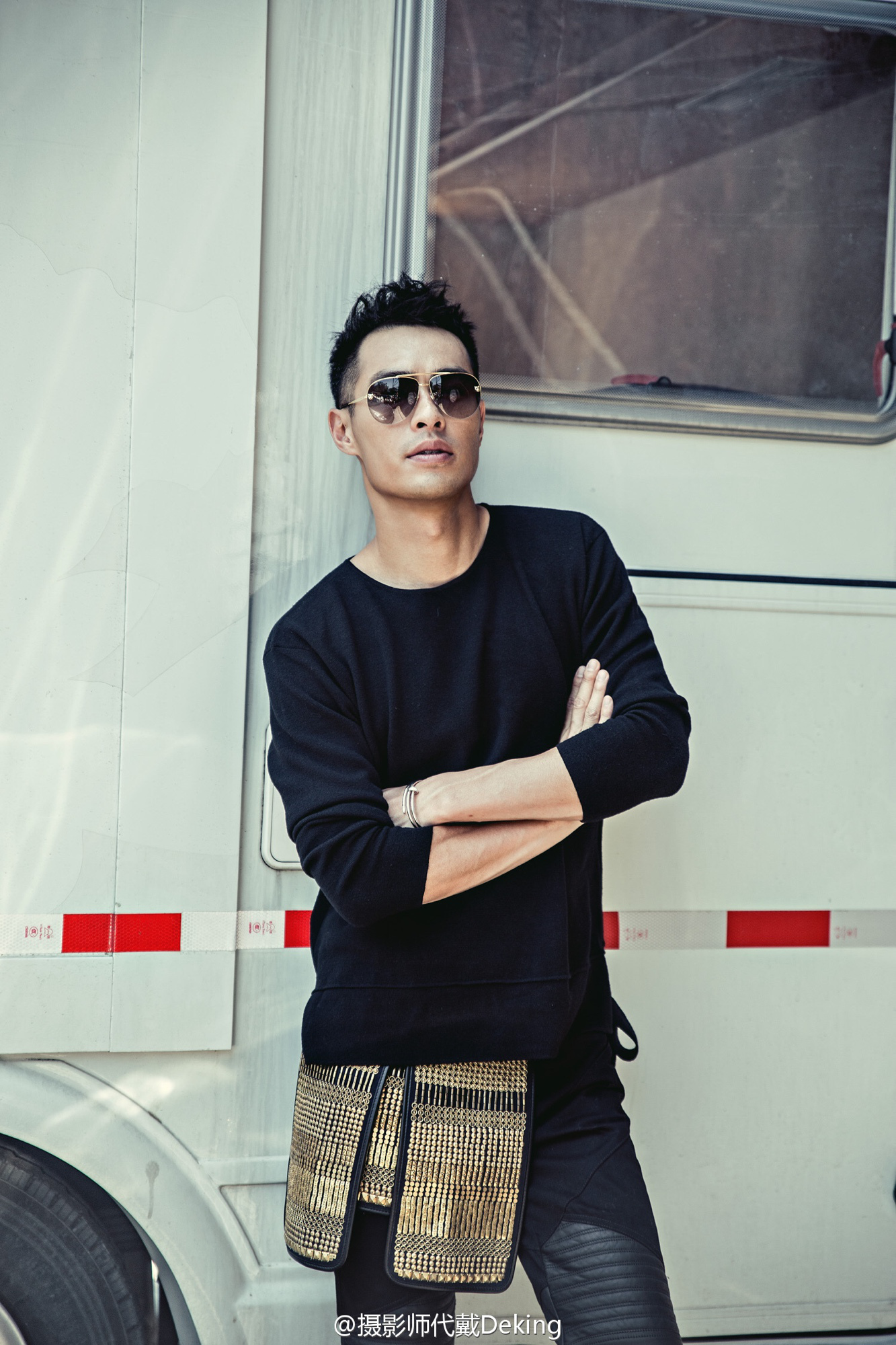
- Yang in 2016
- Other names: Yang You-ning; Yang Yo-ning
- Occupation: Actor
- Years active: 2000–present
- Spouse: Melinda Wang (m. 2020)
- Children: 1
- Awards: Golden Horse Awards – Best New Performer; 2005 Formula 17

Chinese name
- Traditional Chinese: 楊祐寧
- Simplified Chinese: 杨祐宁
- Hanyu Pinyin: Yáng Yòuníng
- Hokkien POJ: Iûⁿ Iū-lêng

Tony Yang (Chinese: 楊祐寧; Pe̍h-ōe-jī: Iûⁿ Iū-lêng) is a Taiwanese actor who rose to prominence for his debut film role in Formula 17 (2004), for which he won the Golden Horse Award for Best New Performer. He is also known for his roles in the Taiwanese box office hits Zone Pro Site (2013) and David Loman (2013), as well as starring in the television series Crystal Boys (2003), Holy Ridge (2006) and Ex-boyfriend (2011).

== Filmography ==
=== Television series ===
Year	English title	Original title	Role	Network/Ref.
2001	My Fair Girl:100% Girl	百分百女孩	Da Zhi	CTV
2002	Ugly Girl Transformation	醜女大翻身	Shou Hwa	CTS
2003	U-Touch Dorm No. 4	U-Touch四號宿舍	Hsu Hao	CTS
2003	Crystal Boys	孽子	Zhao Ying	PTS
2003	Heartbeat Train	心動列車-南向北向的列車	A Huang	TTV
2003	Mascara	公視人生劇展－睫毛膏	Jerry	PTS
2003	Orange Frangrance	又見橘花香	Meng Shiao Po	GTV
2004	Seventeenth Winter 3	十七歲的冬天3	Wei Kang	
2004	My Pet Husband	我的寵物老公	Gary	ETTV
2006	Holy Ridge	聖稜的星光	Zhao Guang	CTS
2008	Dancing Behind You	背著你跳舞	Rudy	Subway series
2010	Ni Yada	倪亞達	Ni Zhongxin	TTV
2011	The Glamorous Imperial Concubine	傾世皇妃	Liu Lianxi	Hunan Television
2011	Ex-boyfriend	前男友	Lai Zhiming	TTV
2012	Love Forward	向前走向愛走	Du Tianze	SETTV
2013	The Pursuit of Happiness	愛的生存之道	Du Tianze	SETTV
2015	Lady & Liar	千金女賊	Sheng Jiewen	Jiangsu Television
2015	OB-Gyns 2	愛的婦產科2	Yang Junbo	Hunan Television
2016	In Love	滾石愛情故事-挪威的森林	Zhuang Zekai	PTS
2019	All Is Well	都挺好	Shi Tiandong	Zhejiang Television; Jiangsu Television
2020	Love Yourself	他其实没有那么爱你	Chen Nan	
2020	The Message	风声	Wu Zhiguo	
2020	Breath of Destiny	一起深呼吸	Li Tiancheng	
2020	My Best Friend's Story	流金岁月	Wang Yongzheng	CCTV-8
2021	The Rebel Princess	上阳赋	Ma Zidan	
2021	The Demi Gods and Semi Devils	天龙八部	Qiao Feng	
2021	Light the Night	華燈初上	Pan Wen-cheng	
2022	Twisted Strings	良辰吉時	Liu Chang-kun	
2022	Chasing the Undercurrent	罰罪	Zhao Peng-chao	

=== Film ===
Year	English title	Original title	Role	Notes/Ref.
2004	Formula 17	十七歲的天空	Zhou Tiancai	
2004	Dream in Hawaii	夢遊夏威夷	A Zhou	
2005	Any Kind of Romance is OK	怎麼浪漫都可以	A Gao	
2006	Catch	國士無雙	Wu Lezhi/ Wu Hwaiyi	
2007	Ming Ming	明明	A Tu	
2007	Blood Brothers	天堂口	Shiao Hu	
2009	Snowfall in Taipei	台北飄雪	A Lei	
2010	Au Revoir Taipei	一頁台北	Raymond	
2010	In Case of Love	街角的小王子	Li Jianjun	
2010	The Tempests of First Love	初戀風暴	Wang Yizhe	
2011	Before Dawn	天亮以前	Horror novelist	Short film
2011	The Next Magic	下一個奇蹟	Guo Jie	
2011	Love on Credit	幸福額度	Shen Tao	
2012	Seed	種子	A Mao	Short film
2012	Love Journey	逐愛之旅(末日之戀)	A Liang	Short film
2012	Wishing for Happiness	想幸福的人	Yu Xiang	Short film
2013	The Bendover	率性生活之末日逆襲	Xiao Hai	Short film
2013	David Loman	大尾鱸鰻	He Xiang	
2013	Zone Pro Site	總舖師	Ye Ruhai	
2014	The Crossing	太平輪：亂世浮生 太平輪：驚濤摯愛	Yan Zeming	Part 1 and 2
2014	The House That Never Dies	京城81號	Huo Lianqi	
2015	The Queens	我是女王	Tony	
2015	Where the Wind Settles	風中家族	Sheng Peng	
2015	Time to Love	新步步驚心	Fourth Prince	
2016	Phantom of the Theatre	魔宮魅影	Gu Weibang	
2016	Distance	再見，在也不見	Lin Renzheng	
2016	My War	我的戰爭	Zhang Luodong	
2016	David Loman 2	大尾鱸鰻2	He Xiang	
2016	Cold War 2	寒戰II	He Guozheng	
2017	The Village of No Return	健忘村	Ding Yuan	Cameo
2017	This Is Not What I Expected	喜歡·你	Cheng Ziqian	
2017	The Founding of an Army	建軍大業	Qian Dajun	
2017	The Adventurers	俠盜聯盟	Chen Xiaobao	
2018	Monster Hunt 2	捉妖記2	Yunqing	
2019	Midnight Diner	深夜食堂		
2020	A Leg	腿	Zheng Zihan	
2021	Dynasty Warriors	真·三國無雙	Liu Bei	
2021	Plurality	複身犯	193	
2021	Anita	梅艷芳	Benjamin Lam	
2023	Bursting Point	爆裂点	Ying Xiu's husband	Cameo
2025	Mudborn	泥娃娃	Chang Hsu-Chuan	

=== Variety and reality show ===
Year	English title	Original title	Notes/Ref.
2017	Divas Hit the Road	花兒與少年	Season 3; guest
2024	Ai's Kitchen	艾嘉食堂	Manager

=== Music video appearances ===
Year	Artist	Song title
2000	Aaron Kwok	"Journey"
2000	Stefanie Sun	"Realize"
2000	Sandy Lam	"Never Ending Story"
2001	Shunza	"Can't Forget"
2001	Sammi Cheng	"Complete"
2001	Stefanie Sun	"Kite"
2001	S.H.E	"Too Much"
2002	Jill Hsu	"Every Day Without You"
2003	Wakin Chau	"Sad Song"
2004	Rock Bang	"Wǒ xiǎng nǐ de kuài lè shì yīn wèi wǒ"
2004	Chris Yu	"Thousand Days and Nights"
2004	Valen Hsu	"One Kilometer"
2009	Amber Kuo	"Bù guò wèn"
2011	Elva Hsiao	"Being Brave"
2012	Rainie Yang	"Wishing for Happiness"
2012	Jason Zhang	"Night Blindness"
2012	Kary Ng	"Rén fēi cǎo mù"
2013	Michelle Chen	"Sorry"
2019	Mayday	"World Crazy #MaydayBlue20th"

== Theater ==
Year	Title	Role
2008	Turn Left, Turn Right	
2010	Great Expectations	Moses

== Awards and nominations ==
Year	Award	Category	Nominated work	Result
2004	41st Golden Horse Awards	Best New Performer	Formula 17	Won
2005	5th Chinese Film Media Awards	Best New Performer	Formula 17	Nominated
2005	5th Chinese Film Media Awards	Best Actor	Formula 17	Nominated
2006	41st Golden Bell Awards	Best Actor	Holy Ridge	Nominated
2012	47th Golden Bell Awards	Best Actor	Ex-boyfriend	Nominated
2016	8th Macau International Movie Festival	Best Supporting Actor	My War	Nominated
2022	23rd Taipei Film Awards	Best Actor	Plurality	Nominated
2022	57th Golden Bell Awards	Best Leading Actor in a Television Series	Light the Night	Nominated
2022	57th Golden Bell Awards	Best Leading Actor in a Miniseries or Television Film	Twisted Strings	Nominated
