= Shino Lin =

Taiwanese singer and actress

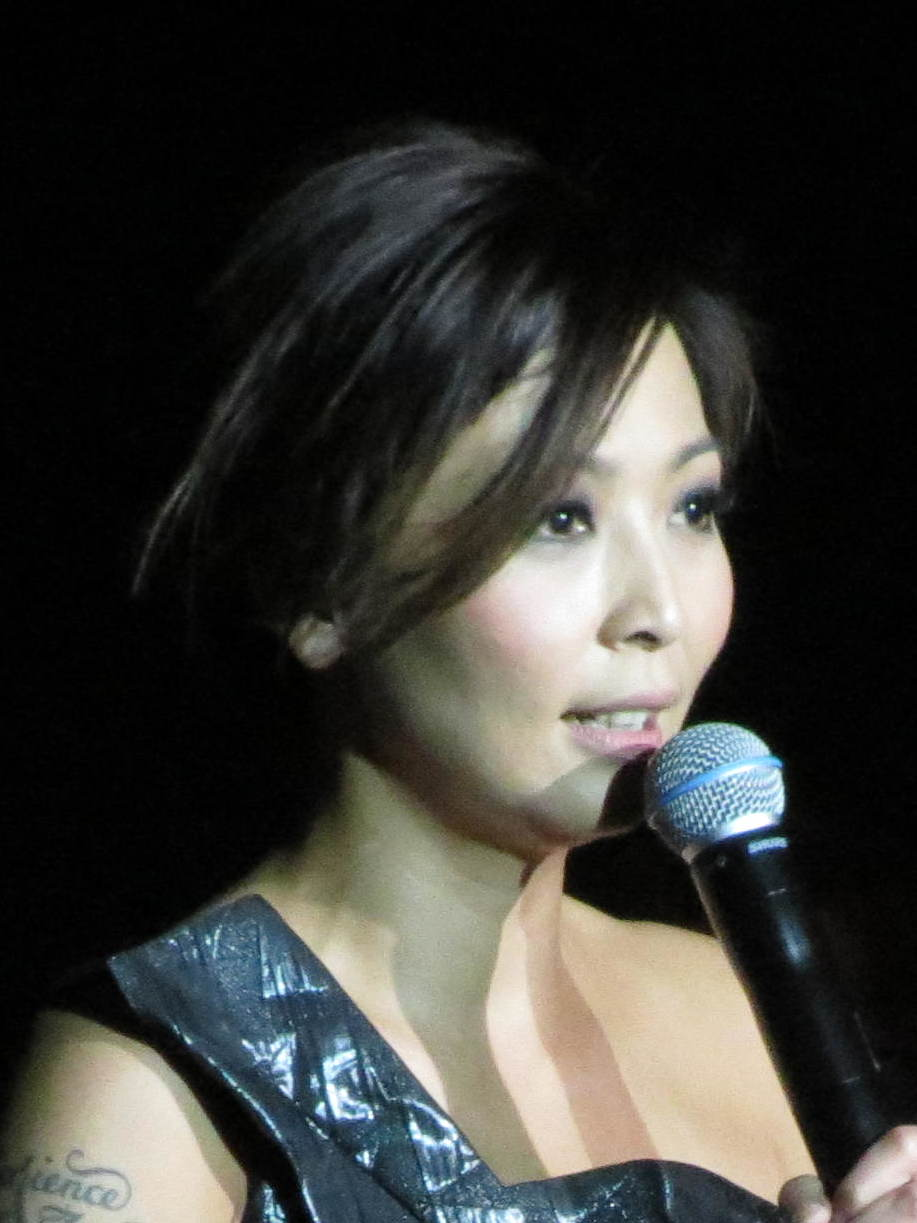
- Born: 9 December 1973 (age 52); Pingtung City, Pingtung, Taiwan
- Occupations: Singer, actress
- Years active: 1998–present

Shino Lin (Chinese: 林曉培; pinyin: Lín Xiǎopéi; born 9 December 1973) is a Taiwanese singer and actress.

== Discography ==
=== Album ===
- 1998 Shino 林曉培
- 1999 She Knows
- 2000 This is Shino 3
- 2001 Shino For
- 2003 Don't Know Good or Bad 不知好歹
- 2003 SHINO 1st Best Compilation 首張精選
- 2008 First Chapter 第壹章
- 2010 Shina and Friends 【五語倫比】 Shino和她的歌兒們 音樂記錄專輯
- 2013 I Forgot 我忘了

=== EP ===
- 1999 Love Song For You
- 2001 Happiness Of You
- 2023 Wish me 願我

== Filmography ==
- 2008: Cape No. 7
- 2017: 52Hz, I Love You
