= A Time in Quchi =

Taiwanese film

- Directed by: Chang Tso-chi
- Screenplay by: Chang Tso-chi
- Produced by: Kao Wen-Hung
- Starring: Yang Liang-yu; Kuan Kuan; Nick Yen; Lin Ya-Jo; Hsieh Ming-Chuan; Cheng Jen-Shuo
- Cinematography: Yuen Hing-Gwok; Chen Chi-cheng; Jerry Hsu
- Edited by: Chang Tso-chi
- Music by: Wu Rei-Ren
- Production company: Chang Tso-chi Film Studio
- Distributed by: Swallow Wings Films
- Release date: December 6, 2013
- Running time: 109 minutes
- Country: Taiwan 台灣
- Language: Taiwanese Mandarin

A Time in Quchi (Chinese title: 暑假作業), directed by Chang Tso-Chi, is a 2013 Taiwanese film. The film premiered in competition at the 66th Locarno International Film Festival. A Time in Quchi features cameo appearances by Yang Liang-Yu, poet Kuan Kuan, Nick Yen (also known as Prince of Star), and Taiwanese actress Hanyi Yao (known as Ginger Chen before 2011).

A Time in Quchi received two nominations for Best New Performer and Best Original Film Music at the 50th Golden Horse Film Festival and Awards.

== Plot ==
The story follows a 10-year-old, somewhat arrogant elementary school boy, Kuan Hsiao-Pao (played by Yang Liang-Yu), around his summer vacation. Growing up in the bustling metropolitan area of Taipei, Taiwan, Hsiao-Pao faces various challenges such as neglectful parents, a mundane school life, an annoying younger sister, unapproachable peers, and the dilemma of how to handle his summer homework. Due to the passing of his grandmother and his parents' divorce as well as their busy work schedule, Hsiao-Pao and his sister are sent by his father (played by Nick Yen) to Quchi, Xindian, at the end of the semester to spend the summer vacation with their grandfather (played by Kuan Kuan) in the countryside.

Hsiao-Pao brings along his tablet and the summer homework assigned by his teacher as he is transferred to a local elementary school with only 27 students. Sent to the countryside, Hsiao-Pao feels simultaneously unfamiliar with and curious about everything that comes with the fresh yet alien rural surroundings, as he is forced to adapt to a lifestyle that is completely different from the one he was used to in Taipei. At this small school, Hsiao-Pao meets a girl nicknamed Da-Xiong (Big Bear), whose family is poor but warm-hearted and cheerful. Meanwhile, an orphan named Ming-Chuan, who secretly has a crush on Da-Xiong, introduces Hsiao-Pao to the world beyond the internet. Making new friends, Hsiao-Pao gradually changes his mindset, moving away from the gaming world on his tablet and embracing the vast countryside.

Hsiao-Pao gradually opens up his heart and begin to care about the people around him. In this idyllic haven, Hsiao-Pao rediscovers a joyful childhood and experiences the importance of family through his daily interactions with his grandfather. However, as a typhoon approaches and a series of events unfold like a torrential flood, disrupting the tranquility of summer vacation, Hsiao-Pao learns during this summer break that, a more challenging life issue, beyond homework, awaits. That is, the price of growing up

== A Time in Quchi and Chang Tso-Chi's Family Trilogy ==
A Time in Quchi is the seventh film directed by Chang Tso-Chi. In A Time in Quchi, Chang Tso-Chi explores family bonds and the complexities of relationships through the perspective of a young boy. The film explores the theme of parental neglect and the yearning for connection.

Chang Tso-Chi is known for his social realism and humanistic attention to the lived experiences he draws inspiration from. Compared to his earlier works, which were dark, masculine, and fierce, A Time in Quchi, as the final installment of the Family Trilogy (How Are You, Dad? from 2009, When Love Comes from 2010, and A Time in Quchi from 2013), takes on a more lyrical and gentle tone. A Time in Quchi is Chang Tso-Chi's self-confession of neglecting his son due to his work. Drawing on his own son's experiences, the film integrates the true nature and daily habits of a young elementary school boy, interweaving moments of humorous and melancholic emotions, revealing the love between people that is both distant and difficult to let go of.

== Chang Tso-Chi's A Time in Quchi (2013) and Hou Hsiao-Hsien's A Summer at Grandpa's (1984) ==
Lo Pecha, curator of the Women Make Waves International Film Festival in Taiwan, in a study guide of A Time in Quchi published on the Taiwan Film and Audiovisual Institute website, discussed extensively about how A Time in Quchi showcases Chang Tso-Chi's signature styles and thematic choices:

"Chang Tso-Chi is known for incorporating realism as the foundation of his films, creating a style that weaves 'life as drama' into the cinematic form. Realistic films emphasize an objective representation of reality, minimizing interference with the visual material while presenting re-imagination and reenactment of the real world. In addition to using non-professional actors, realistic films also emphasize natural lighting, on-location shooting, and employing restrained camera movements and editing techniques. These characteristics are fully showcased in A Time in Quchi. Chang Tso-Chi extensively employs non-professional actors in this film, retaining improvisation and authentic dialogue, as well as natural interactions among children, such as the quarrel between Kuan Hsiao-Pao, his sister, and his grandfather. The film captures familiar slices of life, presenting the natural reactions of elementary school children and ultimately deepening the audience's sense of intimacy with the film's scenarios.

A Time in Quchi shares similarities with A Summer at Grandpa's (1984), directed by Hou Hsiao-Hsien, during Taiwan's New Cinema movement in the 1980s. Both films capture the essence of a specific period of time, namely the summer break, and depict the subtle changes that occur during the process of the protagonists, Hsiao-Pao and Dong Dong, completing their summer assignments. In terms of visual style, both films intentionally slow down the passage of time with long takes, allowing the audience and actors to leisurely immerse themselves in the tranquil pace of the countryside. Both directors also strive to filter out any artificial manipulation that may intrude upon these frames. With the expansive landscapes of nature and the characters seemingly taking a prolonged break, the shifts in the characters' emotional states are examined more quietly.

A Time in Quchi employs realism in its narrative and visual components, aiming to immerse viewers in an authentic world. Chang Tso-Chi utilizes non-professional actors and pays meticulous attention to naturalistic details, contributing to a captivating and relatable cinematic encounter. Through the deliberate use of realism as a stylistic preference, the film effectively connects with audiences, providing a heartfelt examination of life's everyday instances.

Similarly, Maggie Lee, film critic at Vanity Fair, praising A Time in Quchi as, "Delicate and poetic, but full of offbeat humor, this coming-of-ager is Taiwanese auteur Chang Tso-Chi's most accessible work to date," also compares A Time in Quchi with A Summer at Grandpa's:

"Inviting immediate comparisons with Hou Hsiao-Hsien's A Summer at Grandpa's (1984), A Time in Quchi finds Taiwanese auteur Chang Tso-Chi attaining a new level of subtlety with his lucid, unsentimental observations of a boy's coming of age during his country vacation. Putting aside the gangsters, invalids and outcasts that have populated his dark, troubled oeuvre until now, Chang touches on profound themes of loss and separation, evoking delicate feelings in poetic fashion; he also evinces a fresh, offbeat sense of humor that makes this his most accessible work to date. A charmed fest life awaits, but commercial potential is slight."

== Cast ==
- Kuan Hsiao-Pao, played by Yang, Liang-Yu
- Hsiao-Pao's Grandfather, played by Kuan, Yun-Loong (aka Kuan Kuan)
- Hsiao-Pao's Father, played by Nick Yen (aka Prince Star)
- Hsiao-Pao's Mother, played by Michelle Chiang
- Hsiao-Pao's Younger Sister, Kuan Chu-Jo (Jelly), played by Lin, Ya-Jo
- Teacher Han-Yi, played by Yao, Han-Yi
- Ming-Chuan, played by Hsieh, Ming-Chuan
- Da-Xiong (Big Bear), played by Kao, Shui-Lien
- Karaoke Owner, played by Chin, Tzu-Yen
- Jen-Shuo, played by Cheng, Jen-Shuo

== Awards ==
Award	Category	Awardee	Result
The 66th Locarno Festival	Pardo d'oro	A Time in Quchi	Nomination
The 50th Golden Horse Film Festival and Awards	Best New Performer	Yang, Liang-Yu	Nomination
The 50th Golden Horse Film Festival and Awards	Best Original Film Score	Wu, Ruei-Ren	Nomination
