= All Asia Multimedia Network =

- Company type: Private
- Headquarters: Malaysia

All Asia Multimedia Network FZ-LLC is a foreign company in Malaysia. It is a content aggregation arm of the pan-regional pay-TV group Astro All Asia Networks plc.
