= Andy Wu (actor) =

Taiwanese actor (born 1989)

- 吳岳擎
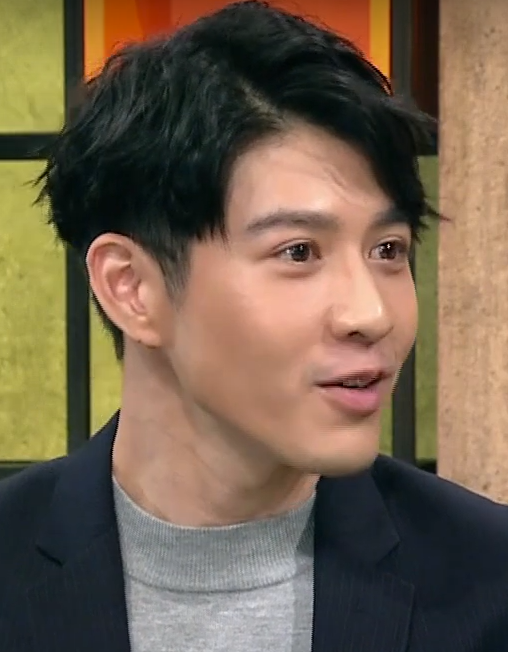
- Wu in April 2020
- Born: Wu Yue-qing; 14 November 1989 (age 36); Taiwan
- Education: Tamkang University
- Occupation: Actor
- Years active: 2016–present

Andy Wu Yue-qing (Chinese: 吳岳擎; born 14 November 1989) is a Taiwanese actor. Making his debut with the melodrama Life Plan A and B (2016), Wu secured starring roles in the television series Jojo's World (2017), Amensalism (2020), and Dear Adam (2022), as well as in the romance film The Outsiders (2018).

== Early life and education ==
Wu was born on 14 November 1989 in Taiwan. His father hails from Hualien, and he grew up in Hualien City from primary school through high school. His family moved to Taipei after Wu enrolled at Tamkang University. Wu was obese as a child, weighing over 98 kg, and only began to lose weight during his university years. He graduated with a bachelor's degree in International Business. After graduation, Wu worked as a model, a bartender, a salesman, a shopkeeper at an accessories store, and at a department store before discovering the Q Place acting workshop and auditioning for it.

== Career ==
In 2015, he joined Wang Shaudi's acting workshop, Q Place, graduating as part of the second cohort. He made his debut with leading roles in the affiliated Q Series, which features television dramas starring Q Place graduates, including Life Plan A and B and 1000 Walls in Dream. Following his debut, Wu began his television acting career and made a special appearance in Love, Timeless. He starred as Zhang Xiao-shuo in the 2017 romance series Jojo's World, followed by another leading role in the 2018 drama series Kira Kira in the life. That same year, he also landed a lead role as Shan Li-chien in The Outsiders, a film adaptation of the 2004 television series of the same name.

In 2019, he starred in the romance series Brave to Love and Déjà vu, followed by a leading role alongside Eleven Yao in the 2020 sci-fi series Amensalism. In 2022, Wu had leading roles in the romance series Dear Adam and the LGBTQ-themed series My Tooth Your Love, and made a cameo appearance as Eleven Yao's character's boyfriend in the Disney+ series Women in Taipei. In 2023, he released his first photo book Andy.

== Filmography ==
=== Film ===
Year	Title	Role	Notes/Ref.
2018	The Outsiders	Shan Li-chien (單立傑)	

=== Television ===
Year	Title	Role	Notes/Ref.
2016	Life Plan A and B	Zhao Hui (趙輝)	Main role
2017	1000 Walls in Dream	Lin Wen-pu (林文樸)	Main role
2017	Love, Timeless	Li Ying-zhu (李英祝)	Special appearance
2017	Jojo's World	Zhang Xiao-shuo (張曉碩)	Main role
2018	Utopia For The 20s	Wu Ming-hung (吳名宏)	Guest role
2018	Kira Kira in the life	Bin (阿斌)	Main role
2019	Brave to Love	Zhao Song-gang (趙松岡)	Main role
2019	Déjà vu	Wang Shi-yuan (王士元)	Main role
2019	All Is Well	Liu Dong-jie (劉東杰)	Recurring role
2019	Wait For The Sun Wait For You	Yue Qing (岳晴)	Guest role
2020	Amensalism	Li Yao-qing (李耀青)	Main role
2022	Dear Adam	Wei Jie (魏傑)	Main role
2022	Mother	Johnny (強尼)	Cameo
2022	Fairy In The House	Si Jue-li (釋覺勵)	Recurring role
2022	Women in Taipei	Kuo An-ho's boyfriend	Cameo
2022	My Tooth Your Love	Bai Lang (白朗)	Main role
