= Zone Pro Site =

- Theatrical release poster
- Directed by: Chen Yu-hsun
- Screenplay by: Chen Yu-hsun
- Produced by: Lee Lieh; Yeh Ju-feng
- Starring: Kimi Hsia; Tony Yang; Lin Mei-hsiu
- Cinematography: Chienn Hsiang
- Edited by: Cheung Ka-wai
- Music by: Owen Wang
- Production companies: 1 Production Film; Ocean Deep Films
- Distributed by: Warner Bros. Taiwan
- Release dates: July 12, 2013 (Taipei Film Festival); August 16, 2013 (Taiwan)
- Running time: 145 minutes
- Country: Taiwan
- Languages: Mandarin; Taiwanese
- Budget: NT$70 million
- Box office: NT$305 million (Taiwan)

Zone Pro Site (Chinese: 總舖師; Pe̍h-ōe-jī: Chóng-phò͘-sai; lit. "Bandoh master chef"), also known as Zone Pro Site: The Moveable Feast, is a 2013 Taiwanese comedy film directed by Chen Yu-hsun, starring Kimi Hsia, Tony Yang and Lin Mei-hsiu.

== Plot ==
Aspiring model Wan rejects her late father Master Fly Spirit's dying wish to inherit his legendary culinary expertise, but fails countless auditions in Taipei and is left saddled with her ex-boyfriend's debt. Returning home to Tainan to flee debt collectors, she learns that her family's traditional outdoor banquet catering business has been reduced to a single noodle stand managed by her well-meaning but inept stepmother Puffy, who recently lost a bet with her late husband's former apprentice, rival chef Tsai.

When an elderly couple seek Fly Spirit to cater for their upcoming wedding, Wan impulsively accepts the job despite having lost her father's prized cookbook to a vagrant. With the help of a wandering gourmet doctor named Hai and Fly Spirit's own former master, Master Tiger Nose, Wan and Puffy begin recreating the lost recipes. Local businessman Chairman Hsu is impressed by their nostalgic dish of Fried Rice Noodles, and encourages them to take part in the National Catering Contest, with a one million dollar first prize that would help cover Wan's debt and fame that would restore the family business to its former glory.

Wan and Hai grow closer, but become estranged after an argument over Wan's reluctance to embrace her late father's legacy and Hai's past as a convicted felon. To complicate matters, Wan's debt collectors come calling and insist on accompanying them to the catering contest, to ensure they receive the prize money. Meanwhile, Hai encounters his mentor, the paroled gangster and infamous underground chef Master Ghost Head, who recruits him into Chef Tsai's team for the competition.

Arriving in Taipei, Wan and Puffy brave through multiple rounds of the catering contest, assisted by Tiger Nose, his caregiver Rosemary, an eccentric trio of students, and surreptitious help from Hai, as well as the two debt collectors press-ganged into being kitchen stooges. Between rounds, Wan has numerous encounters with the vagrant, who is revealed to be Master Silly Mortal, another famed chef who now cooks exclusively for the homeless. Silly Mortal returns the remnants of Fly Spirit's cookbook to Wan, offers her hot meals and sage wisdom, as well as teaching her the true meaning of traditional outdoor banquet catering.

Although Wan ultimately loses the final round to Tsai, she restores her family's reputation and gains satisfaction from successfully catering for the elderly newlyweds' banquet, as well as being rewarded a lucrative government contract to supply railway boxed lunches as second prize. The Stooges write off Wan's debt, revealing it to be part of a scam, and join her and Puffy in their new business venture. Finally, Hai visits Wan's new store and reconciles with her.

== Cast ==
- Kimi Hsia as Wan, an unsuccessful model who sets out to restore her family's catering business
- Tony Yang as Hai, a self-styled "gourmet doctor" who improves the dishes of struggling restaurants
- Lin Mei-hsiu as Ai-Fong (Puffy), Wan's loudmouthed but well-meaning stepmother
- Bamboo Chen as Stooge A, a debt collector unexpectedly recruited into helping Wan
- Chen Wan-hao as Stooge B, a fellow debt collector to Stooge A also recruited by Wan
- Ko I-chen as Master Fly Spirit, one of three legendary master chefs and Wan's late father
- Hsi Hsiang as Master Ghost Head, the second of three legendary master chef and a former convicted felon, as well as Hai's mentor
- Wu Nien-jen as Master Silly Mortal, the third legendary master chef and a drifter
- Mi Ling as Tsai, Master Fly Spirit's former apprentice and Wan's rival in the National Catering Competition
- Tuo Hsien as Master Tiger Nose, Master Fly Spirit's senile former master
- Love Fang as Rosemary, Master Tiger Nose's Indonesian caregiver
- Lu Fu-Lu as Chairman Hsu, a local businessman nostalgic for the Fried Rice Noodles from his youth

The film also features Hsu Chen-Te, Chen Yen-Tso, and Chein Yu-An as the "Animals on Call", a trio of resourceful and internet-savvy students who frequently aid Wan. Chen Po-Wen and Pai Ming-Hua appear as the elderly couple whose request for a banquet at their upcoming wedding sets Wan off on her quest. Wang Tzu-Chiang and Lai Pei-Ying appear as Mr and Mrs. Wang, proprietors of a nearby restaurant with a family secret soy sauce recipe. Yang Li-Yin, Shan Cheng-Ju, and Hsieh yu-Wei appears as Judges Jiang, Liu, and King, a trio of food critics presiding over the National Catering Competition. Wu Pong-fong appears as Master Tiger Nose's master in the flashback framing story set in rural Taiwan. Kao Ming-Wei and Jane Liao appear as the banquet's hosts.

Singer-songwriter Ma Nien-hsien, who performed a number of songs in the film's official soundtrack, makes a guest appearance as a taxi driver, while Rhydian Vaughan cameos as a ukulele street musician, although their scenes were ultimately cut from the film and instead shown in the credits.

== Soundtrack ==
Zone Pro Site: Original Motion Picture Soundtrack

Soundtrack album by Various artists
- Released: October 9, 2013
- Genre: Film soundtrack
- Label: Asia Muse

No.	Title	Performer	Length
1.	"Fresco 壁畫 (instrumental)"	Owen Wang	0:46
2.	"I'm Chan Hsiao-wan 我是沾醬油 (instrumental)"	Owen Wang	1:57
3.	"Leaving 離開 (instrumental)"	Owen Wang	0:33
4.	"Jin Ma Bo Un 金罵沒ㄤ"	Lin Mei-hsiu	3:01
5.	"PK! Puffy and Tsai 膨風嫂與阿財的PK (instrumental)"	Owen Wang	1:53
6.	"A Fifty-year Romance 五十年前的邂逅 (instrumental)"	Owen Wang	1:03
7.	"Northern Gourmet Doctor With 16 Knives 北方十六把刀 (instrumental)"	Owen Wang	0:56
8.	"San Ba A Hua Chui La Ba (A Hua version) 三八阿花吹喇叭(阿花版) (instrumental)"	Kimi Hsia, Chen Chu-sheng, Chen Wan-hao, Lin Mei-hsiu	4:20
9.	"Eggs' Happiness 蛋蛋的幸福 (instrumental)"	Owen Wang	2:00
10.	"Rice Will Also Be Proud Of It 米也會感到驕傲吧 (instrumental)"	Owen Wang	1:04
11.	"Hsia's Fried Rice Noodles 月霞的炒米粉 (instrumental)"	Owen Wang	1:31
12.	"Ghost Master's Theme Song 鬼頭的主題曲"	Liu Wen-zheng	3:32
13.	"Bridge the Gap? 不橋一下嗎? (instrumental)"	Owen Wang	0:45
14.	"We're Inseparable 我們不會再分離了 (instrumental)"	Owen Wang	0:33
15.	"Highway Fools 有個虎鼻師"	Ma Nien-hsien	1:15
16.	"Escape 落跑 (instrumental)"	Owen Wang	0:52
17.	"Silly Mortal Hotel 憨人大飯店 (instrumental)"	Owen Wang	2:08
18.	"The Beach & the Moon 沙灘與月球 (instrumental)"	Owen Wang	3:09
19.	"Chicken Belly Turtle 雞仔豬肚鱉 (instrumental)"	Owen Wang	0:30
20.	"Wang's Soy-bean Sauce 王家醬油 (instrumental)"	Owen Wang	0:59
21.	"Animals on Call's Delivery 招喚獸使命必達 (instrumental)"	Owen Wang	0:41
22.	"The Traditional Spirit 古早心 (instrumental)"	Owen Wang	1:20
23.	"Master Fly Spirit's Rain Boots 蒼蠅的雨鞋 (instrumental)"	Owen Wang	2:34
24.	"Attack On! Rosemary! 進擊的露絲米 (instrumental)"	Owen Wang	1:23
25.	"Hawaii 夏威夷"	Ma Nien-hsien	2:39
26.	"Father's Speciality 爸爸的手路菜 (instrumental)"	Owen Wang	2:55
27.	"No Complaints, No Regrets 無怨無悔 (instrumental)"	Owen Wang	0:53
28.	"Hsiao-wan's Lunch Box 小婉便當 (instrumental)"	Owen Wang	0:51
29.	"Gypsy Roaches 吉普賽蟑螂"	Ma Nien-hsien	1:20
30.	"I'm Sitting Next To You 偶在你左邊 (instrumental)"	Owen Wang	1:45
31.	"San Ba A Hua Chui La Ba (Lao Wang version) 三八阿花吹喇叭(老王版)"	Sticky Rice	4:08

== Reception ==
It was the 6th highest-grossing film of 2013 in Taiwan, with NT$305 million.

Film Business Asia's Derek Elley gave the film a rating of 8 out of 10.

== Awards and nominations ==
Award ceremony	Category	Recipients	Result
50th Golden Horse Awards	Best Original Film Score	Owen Wang	Nominated
50th Golden Horse Awards	Best Original Film Song	Song: "Jin Ma Bo Un" ("金罵沒ㄤ"); Writer: Ma Nien-hsien; Performer: Lin Mei-hsiu	Nominated
2014 Italy Asian Film Festival	Best Film	Zone Pro Site	Won
2014 Amsterdam Food Film Festival	Audience Award	Zone Pro Site	Won
2014 Devour! The Food Film Fest	Golden Tine Award for Best Feature	Zone Pro Site	Won
2014 New York Asian Film Festival	Audience Award	Zone Pro Site	Won
2014 Taipei Film Festival	Best Supporting Actress	Lin Mei-hsiu	Won
2014 Taipei Film Festival	Outstanding Artistic Contribution in Art Design	Max Huang	Won
