= 51st Golden Horse Awards =

Award ceremony for Chinese-language films of 2013 and 2014

- Promotional poster
- Date: November 22, 2014
- Site: Sun Yat-sen Memorial Hall, Taipei, Taiwan
- Hosted by: Ella Chen; Mickey Huang
- Preshow hosts: Yang Chien-pei; Gordon Yang
- Organized by: Taipei Golden Horse Film Festival Executive Committee

Highlights
- Best Feature Film: Blind Massage
- Best Director: Ann Hui; The Golden Era
- Best Actor: Chen Jianbin; A Fool
- Best Actress: Chen Shiang-chyi; Exit
- Most awards: Blind Massage (6)
- Most nominations: Black Coal, Thin Ice (8)

Television in Taiwan
- Channel: TTV

The 51st Golden Horse Awards (Mandarin:第51屆金馬獎) took place on November 22, 2014 at the Sun Yat-sen Memorial Hall in Taipei, Taiwan.

== Winners and nominees ==
Winners are listed first and highlighted in boldface.

| **Best Feature Film**: **Blind Massage**; A Fool; Black Coal, Thin Ice; The Golden Era; Kano | **Best Animation Feature** - |
| **Best Documentary**: **Cotton**; The Walkers; The Last Moose of Aoluguya | **Best Short Film**: **The Hammer and Sickle Are Sleeping**; Stairway; The Free Man; The Great Buddha; Heipigu |
| **Best Director**: **Ann Hui — The Golden Era**; Midi Z — Ice Poison; Diao Yinan — Black Coal, Thin Ice; Wang Xiaoshuai — Red Amnesia; Lou Ye — Blind Massage | **Best Leading Actor**: **Chen Jianbin — A Fool**; Sean Lau — The White Storm; Liao Fan — Black Coal, Thin Ice; Masatoshi Nagase — Kano; Chang Chen — Brotherhood of Blades |
| **Best Leading Actress**: **Chen Shiang-chyi — Exit**; Gwei Lun-mei — Black Coal, Thin Ice; Gong Li — Coming Home; Tang Wei — The Golden Era; Zhao Wei — Dearest | **Best Supporting Actor**: **Chen Jianbin — Paradise in Service**; Wang Xuebing — A Fool; Ng Man-tat — Aberdeen; Leon Dai — (Sex) Appeal; Chin Shih-chieh — Brotherhood of Blades |
| **Best Supporting Actress**: **Wan Qian — Paradise in Service**; Hao Lei — The Golden Era; Nina Paw — Insanity; Lang Tzu-yun — Sweet Alibis; Ivy Chen — Paradise in Service | **Best New Director**: **Chen Jianbin — A Fool**; Chienn Hsiang — Exit; Xin Yukun — The Coffin in the Mountain; Umin Boya — Kano; Li Xiaofeng — Nezha |
| **Best New Performer**: **Zhang Lei — Blind Massage**; Hsu Wei-ning — Design 7 Love; Zhang Huiwen — Coming Home; Tsao Yu-ning — Kano; Matthew Wei — Meeting Dr. Sun | **Best Original Screenplay**: **Yee Chih-yen — Meeting Dr. Sun**; Xin Yukun and Feng Yuanliang — The Coffin in the Mountain; Diao Yinan — Black Coal, Thin Ice; Li Qiang — The Golden Era; Wang Xiaoshuai, Fang Lei and Li Fei — Red Amnesia |
| **Best Adapted Screenplay**: **Ma Yingli — Blind Massage**; Chen Jianbin — A Fool; Chan Fai-hung, Kong Ho-yan and Fruit Chan — The Midnight After; Zou Jingzhi — Coming Home; Li Xiaofeng, Wang Mu and Pan Yu — Nezha | **Best Cinematography**: **Zeng Jian — Blind Massage**; Dong Jinsong — Black Coal, Thin Ice; Du Jie — No Man's Land; Mark Lee Ping-bing — (Sex) Appeal; Zhang Ji — North by Northeast |
| **Best Visual Effects**: **Tong Ka-wai, Ken Law Wai-ho and Lucky Leung Chin-fung — The Midnight After**; Hi-Organic Motion Graphic Studio — Design 7 Love; Ng Yuen-fai, Chas Chau Chi-shing and Tam Kai-kwan — The White Storm; Kim Wook and Park Young-soo — Young Detective Dee: Rise of the Sea Dragon; Henri Wong, Hugo Kwan and Walter Wong — As the Light Goes Out | **Best Art Direction**: **Liu Qiang — Black Coal, Thin Ice**; Mak Kwok-keung — Young Detective Dee: Rise of the Sea Dragon; Fu Yingzhang — Uncle Victory; Hao Yi — No Man's Land; Huang Mei-ching — Paradise in Service |
| **Best Makeup & Costume Design**: **Liang Tingting — Brotherhood of Blades**; Hao Yi — No Man's Land; Bruce Yu and Lee Pik-kwan — Young Detective Dee: Rise of the Sea Dragon; Amanda Deng, Singing Lin and Tu Mei-ling — Kano; Fang Chi-luen, Hsu Li-wen, Kao Chia-lin — Paradise in Service | **Best Action Choreography**: **Jack Wong Wai-leung — As the Light Goes Out**; Li Chung-chi — The White Storm; Yuen Bun and Lin Feng — Young Detective Dee: Rise of the Sea Dragon; Donnie Yen, Stephen Tun Wai, Yuen Bun and Yan Hua — Kung Fu Jungle; Sang Lin — Brotherhood of Blades |
| **Best Original Film Score**: **Qigang Chen — Coming Home**; Owen Wang, Annie Lo and Lin Nieh — The Twelve Nights; Kenji Kawai — Young Detective Dee: Rise of the Sea Dragon; Nathan Wang, Dong Dongdong and Jiang Yongjun — No Man's Land; He Miaoshu — North by Northeast | **Best Original Film Song**: **"The Road We Pass" — The Continent**; **Composer: Pu Shu**; **Lyrics: Pu Shu and Han Han**; **Performer: Pu Shu**; "Xin Zhao Yi Sheng" — The White Storm; Composer: RubberBand; Lyrics: RubberBand and Tim Lui; Performer: RubberBand; "Destination" — Aberdeen; Composer: Anthony Wong Yiu-ming and Jason Choi; Lyrics: Wyman Wong; Performer: Anthony Wong Yiu-ming; "Mr. Bird" — Kano; Composer: Suming; Lyrics: Umin Boya; Performer: Actors in Kano; "Happiness" — (Sex) Appeal; Composer: David Tao; Lyrics: Wawa; Performer: David Tao |
| **Best Film Editing**: **Kong Jinglei and Jolin Zhu — Blind Massage**; Yau Chi-wai — The White Storm; Yang Hongyu — Black Coal, Thin Ice; Du Yuan — No Man's Land; Zhu Liyun and Tu Yiran — Brotherhood of Blades | **Best Sound Effects**: **Fu Kang — Blind Massage**; Kinson Tsang, Yiu Chun-hin and Chow Yuk-lun — The White Storm; Tao Jing — Coming Home; Fu Kang — Red Amnesia; Tu Duu-chih and Tang Hsiang-chu — Paradise in Service |
| **Audience Choice Award**: **Kano**; A Fool; Black Coal, Thin Ice; The Golden Era; Blind Massage | **FIPRESCI Prize** **(award for first and second features)**: **Kano** |
**NETPAC Award** **(award for feature films by Asian new talent)**: **Quick Change**
| **Outstanding Taiwanese Filmmaker of the Year**: **Jimmy Huang** | **Lifetime Achievement Award**: **Tien Feng** |
