= 52Hz, I Love You =

- Theatrical release poster
- Mandarin: 52赫茲我愛你
- Directed by: Wei Te-sheng
- Written by: Wei Te-sheng; Yu Wen-hsing; Soda Voyu
- Produced by: Bob M. S. Wong; Lin Tian-guei; Lin Yu-je; Wei Te-sheng
- Starring: Lin Zhong-yu; Zhuang Juan-ying; Suming; Mify Chen
- Cinematography: Chin Ting-chang
- Edited by: Milk Su
- Music by: Lee Cheng-fan
- Production company: 52Hz Production
- Distributed by: Vie Vision Pictures
- Release date: 26 January 2017
- Running time: 110 minutes
- Country: Taiwan
- Language: Mandarin
- Budget: NT$80 million (US$2.6 million)
- Box office: NT$45.5 million (US$1.5 million)

52 Hz, I Love You (Chinese: 52赫茲我愛你) is a 2017 Taiwanese musical drama film directed by Wei Te-sheng. It was released on 26 January 2017.

== Premise ==
52Hz, I Love You comprises various love stories set in modern Taipei City on Valentine's Day. The title of the film references the 52-hertz whale, described as "the world's loneliest whale" as no other whales can hear its unusual frequency call. This serves as a metaphor for loneliness and finding love.

== Cast ==
- Lin Zhong-yu as Ang
- Zhuang Juan-ying as Xin
- Suming as Da-he
- Mify Chen as Lei

=== Cameo appearance ===
- Sandrine Pinna as Qi
- Nana Lee as Mei
- Lin Ching-tai as Dong
- Cyndi Chao as Xin's Aunt
- Cheng Wei-da as Xin's Brother
- Sun Ruei as Girlfriend of Xin's Brother
- Van Fan as Band Member
- Ma Nien-hsien as Band Member
- Min Hsiung as Band Member
- Ying Wei-min as Band Member
- Chie Tanaka as Server
- Shino Lin as Server
- Joanne Yang as Server
- Ma Ju-lung as Customer
- Pei Hsiao-lan as Customer
- Ko Wen-je as himself
- Allison Limmer as extra

== Soundtrack ==
52Hz, I Love You : Original Motion Picture Soundtrack

Soundtrack album by Various Artists
- Released: 26 January 2017
- Genre: Film soundtrack
- Labels: ARS Film Production, Universal Music Taiwan

No.	Title	Performer	Length
1.	"It's Valentine's Day 今天是情人節"	Zhuang Juan-ying, Guan Guan	5:50
2.	"52 HZ, I Love You 52赫茲我愛你"	Lin Zhong-yu, Zhuang Juan-ying	3:29
3.	"Rose With Thorns 是誰種了有刺的玫瑰"	Zhuang Juan-ying, Cyndi Chao	3:03
4.	"The Debt of Love 愛情卡債"	Mify Chen, Suming	4:58
5.	"Reflection of the Mirror 鏡子裡的你鏡子外的我"	Sandrine Pinna, Nana Lee	2:38
6.	"Love Resume 真愛履歷"	Cyndi Chao, Zhuang Juan-ying, Suming	4:58
7.	"Do and Mi without Sol Do Mi沒有Sol"	Lin Zhong-yu, Zhuang Juan-ying	5:17
8.	"Sun Rain 太陽雨"	Suming, Mify Chen	5:02
9.	"Bittersweet 一點苦一點甜"	Lin Zhong-yu, Lin Ching-tai	5:37
10.	"In and Out of Love 開門關門"	Sandrine Pinna, Nana Lee, Van Fan, Lin Ching-tai, Cyndi Chao, Suming, Mify Chen, Lin Zhong-yu	3:29
11.	"Golden Ratio 黃金比例"	Zhuang Juan-ying, Lin Zhong-yu, Paige Su, Sandrine Pinna, Nana Lee	5:14
12.	"Cupid Needs Love 丘比特也要愛"	Cyndi Chao, Lin Ching-tai, Zhuang Juan-ying, Lin Zhong-yu, Mify Chen, Suming	3:45
13.	"Not Too Late 來得及"	Mify Chen, Suming	2:23
14.	"When Fate Meets Chance 命運還是機會"	Lin Zhong-yu, Zhuang Juan-ying, Mify Chen, Suming	5:05
15.	"Ten Years 十年"	Suming	3:38
16.	"Big World, Small World 大世界小世界"	Van Fan	3:57
17.	"Du Lu Da La 愛情就是啦啦啦"	Lin Zhong-yu, Zhuang Juan-ying, Mify Chen, Suming	2:29
18.	"52Hz, I Love you (Bass Solo version) 52赫茲我愛你 (貝斯對話版)"	Lin Zhong-yu	3:31

== Reception ==
=== Box office ===
As of 4 March 2017, 52Hz, I Love You grossed NT$45.5 million (US$1.5 million), against a production budget of NT$80 million (US$2.6 million).

In Taiwan, 52Hz, I Love You was released alongside domestic productions The Village of No Return and Hanky Panky, and Hollywood films Resident Evil: The Final Chapter, Moana and Hidden Figures, and was projected to gross NT$100 million over the Lunar New Year holiday frame. It went on to make NT$22.8 million (US$730,000) in its opening weekend, ranking seventh at the Taipei box office.

With the film's box office performance in Taiwan, the film was considered a box office disappointment, making it one of the lowest-grossing films from Wei Te-sheng. The filmmaker had previously directed the financially successful Cape No. 7 (2008) and Seediq Bale (2011), namely the highest and second-highest grossing domestic film of all time at the Taiwan box office. In an interview, Wei stated that the film's overall financial success will depend on its international distribution and VOD sales, as well as merchandising sales revenue.

=== Critical response ===
Elizabeth Kerr of The Hollywood Reporter said, "predictable though it may be, Wei has been careful to replicate the whimsical ebbs, flows and beats required of the form, and 52Hz, I Love You captures the cotton candy essence of the musical romance rather effectively." Edmund Lee of South China Morning Post rated it 2.5/5 stars and wrote that the film "proves to be a pleasant trifle, which does a far more effective job of pleasing the ear than stirring the heart".
