= Tenma Shibuya =

Japanese actor

- 渋谷 天馬
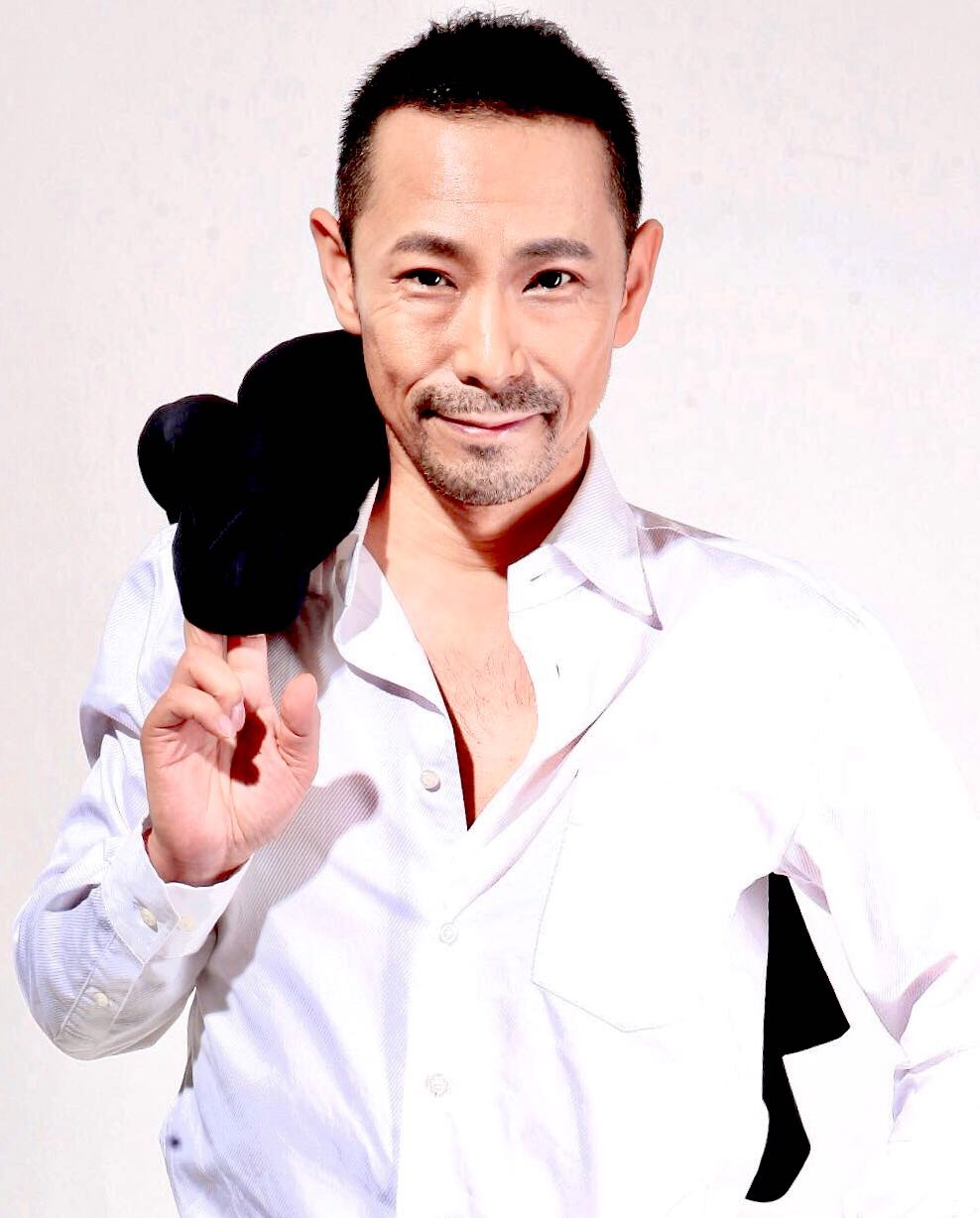
- Born: January 13, 1969 (age 57); Saitama, Japan
- Other names: 渋谷天馬 / 澀谷天馬，Shibuya Tenma, Segu Tianma
- Occupation: Actor
- Years active: 1993–present

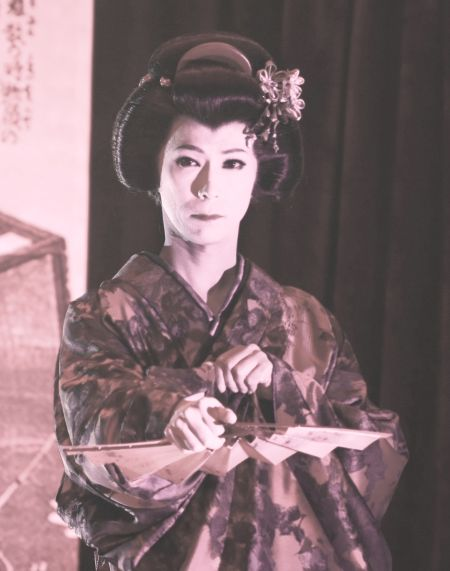
Tenma Shibuya, dancing Japanese classical dance (woman)

Tenma Shibuya (渋谷 天馬, Shibuya Tenma; born January 13, 1969) is a Japanese actor, classical dancer, and cultural exchange activist. He began his career as an actor in 1993 after returning from the United States, where he attended college. He made appearances in a number of films, stage productions, and television dramas in his early acting career in Japan. Some of this work includes: Romeo and Juliet (director: Yukio Ninagawa), Agitator (director: Takashi Miike), and Appleseed (director: Shinji Aramaki). In 2006, Shibuya visited China for the first time, leading to his transition into Chinese show business.

From 2008 to 2010, Shibuya starred in a number of productions of various media, including the Hong Kong film Ip Man, as well as the Chinese productions The Flowers of War and Borrow Gun (借枪). He also appeared in the Taiwanese film Kano, the Russian drama Sorge, and the 2018 international production Air Strike (with Bruce Willis, Adrien Brody, and Rumer Willis).

In addition to acting, Shibuya has been a Japanese classical dancer and songwriter for over twenty years. During this time he has also volunteered in international cultural exchange activities and taught Japanese in high schools as a volunteer in Eugene, Oregon. He is a founder of the Japan-China Cultural Exchange Promotion, a Tokyo-based nonprofit organization aiming to promote cultural exchange between Japan and China. He has served as the general director of this organization since its launch in 2009.

== Early life ==
Tenma Shibuya was born on January 13, 1969, in Saitama, Japan. In 1989, he traveled to the United States to study at the University of Oregon. He returned to Japan in 1991, around the time his mother died. While preparing to return to the United States, he had an accident that affected his lower back, forcing him to stay in order to fully recover, which took six years. As his backache was eased by treatment and therapy, he grew determined to become an actor, at which point he entered acting school.

== Entertainment career ==
=== 1993–2004: Early work in Japan ===
Shibuya began his acting career in 1993. Determined to become globally active, he felt the need to accumulate experiences in Japan until larger opportunities arose. Besides acting on a daily basis, Shibuya further improved his performing skills by attending: method acting classes taught by Yoko Narahashi, who would later become a prominent figure of the Japanese film industry, which shaped his present acting style; film acting classes at Eizoujuku – a professional film college founded by Genji Nakamura, a director; Japanese classical dancing classes by Nishikawa Kazuma – the master of Nishikawa school; vocal training at AK MUSIC, specializing in opera, chanson, and pop music. Shibuya acted in a number of independent and short films, in addition to his guest appearances for various film productions, which familiarized him with their methods and styles. Meanwhile, he had also taken part in filmmaking and would sing original songs while playing guitar. Shibuya sought improvement day and night.

Shibuya's commercial debut was in Sadistic Song (1995), a film directed by Genji Nakamura. In 1997, he was presented with theatric opportunities. In March, he participated in Boléro, a famous ballet work. The performance, which was choreographed by Maurice Béjart and directed by Shiro Mizoshita of Tokyo Ballet, was presented at the Tokyo culture hall. In July, he performed in Princess Sayo, as both a character and dancer. In August 1997, Shibuya served as an assistant director in Annie Get Your Gun, a Broadway musical, in Nagoya Chunichi Theater. The following year, he played Lord Capulet in Romeo and Juliet, as directed by Yukio Ninagawa. In 2001, Shibuya got a role in Agitator, a film by Takashi Miike, playing a member of the Mafia, who would support his leader played by Naoto Takenaka. During this period, Shibuya played small parts such as detective, gangster, doctor, and lawyer. Shibuya's first experience with computer-generated animation was in Appleseed. His performance of four characters was recorded and later processed into animation through motion capture. The film was directed by Shinji Aramaki and was released globally in 2004.

=== 2006–2010: Move to China ===
Shibuya made plans to start performing in China, only deterred by the language barrier. After learning Mandarin in Beijing Language and Culture University for six months, he officially started his acting career in Chinese show business and, in autumn 2006, he starred in his first Chinese TV drama Caoyuanchunlaizao, playing Shouji Kanai. In the following year, he co-led his first movie in China, Feihuduidiezhan. Directed by Li Shu, it was the most rebroadcast film of the year, aired by the predominant movie channel in China, CCTV-6. Although a new face to Chinese audiences, his performances were soon recognized within the industry.

In 2008, Shibuya starred in Ip Man, a kung-fu movie by Wilson Yip, which won the best film award at the 28th Hong Kong Film Awards. Shibuya's role, Colonel Sato, a cold-blooded and crafty villain, not only gained him reputation among professionals but also secured notoriety with the general public. The director, Wilson, half-jokingly warned him to stay away from movie theaters, in reference to the excitement of the audiences.

Shibuya performed in his first television costume drama, Yangguifeimishi, in 2009. Directed by You Xiaogang and starring Yin Tao and Anthony Wong, the show was set in China in the Tang dynasty. Despite being a foreigner, Shibuya successfully portrayed his ancient-Chinese character.

In 2010, Shibuya had a lead role in Shenhe, Minetsugu Yoshida, an ornithologist who went to Zhalong Lake in search of two lost cranes from Japan. The film was shot in Qiqihar, a northeastern city in China where the temperature would drop to −30 °C (−22 °F). Shibuya's next TV drama, Jieqiang (Borrow Gun), was a commercial success and critically acclaimed. His part, Kato Keiji, an emotional and cunning antagonist, was remarked by critics as both evil and fascinating. The program broke the record for the highest revenue in the history of Chinese TV shows. Shibuya became one of the most popular Japanese actors in China and, as his works were broadcast globally, his worldwide presence was established.

=== 2011–2015 ===
In 2011, Shibuya had a chance to act with Christian Bale in The Flowers of War (directed by Zhang Yimou), playing a military officer.

TV drama Daxifa (Chinese Traditional Magic), released in 2012, gave Shibuya a chance to play a complex and unique character. The role of Wutengzhang, a Japanese magician who came to China to steal a secret document of Chinese traditional magic, differed greatly from the military roles that Shibuya had playing in the past. As the story progresses, the character adopts various identities including: an honest young man, a female dancer, a magician performing on stage, an old woman, and a mad middle-aged man. A further challenge for Shibuya was to speak Mandarin fluently in all 40 episodes. Despite this, Shibuya gained praise for his acting skill and professionalism.

In 2012, Shibuya played Ichiro Nakamura, the second male lead in the film Hushed Roar. His character is a simple-minded person who suffers from hypoglycemia, whose marriage with his long-time lover was ended for his fear that his illness was hereditary. The character, rich in emotions, was an unfamiliar type for Shibuya to play. Shibuya spoke English in the film – as required by the setting. Without knowing him in person, the producer said that Shibuya's performance as a comical role gave her the confidence to cast him, and that she was very satisfied with Shibuya's performance. The film officially participated in Montréal World Film Festival

In 2013, Shibuya participated in KANO. The film tells the story of a high school baseball team in Taiwan. Umin Boya, the director, offered the role as he was impressed by Shibuya's performance in Ip Man. It broke the box office record in Taiwan and was also very successful in Japan, Hong Kong, and some other countries. In the same year, Shibuya appeared in Xiaobaohelaocai, his first opportunity to play a comedic role in China. Busy in Taiwan shooting KANO, he was able to join for one day of filming in Beijing. The supporting role of colonel Qingtian was a complicated one, despite only a few appearances. His performance was praised by both the crew members and the audience. He was noted in the main cast despite the size of his part.

Shibuya continued to expand his range in China through TV dramas Fenghuoshuangxiong (2013), Youchai (2015), and Tiezaishao (2015).

By 2015, Shibuya had more freedom in choosing future appearances as his fame and wealth increased. He led in Wanfeng, a graduation project by a group of students from Beijing Film Academy.

=== 2018–present ===
Shibuya had kept in touch with Xiao Feng since they worked on Hushed Roar in 2012. So, when Xiao Feng directed Air Strike four years later, he entrusted Shibuya with the only Japanese main role.

The film was co-produced by Chinese, Korean, and Hollywood teams. Its consultants included Vilmos Zsigmond, Richard Anderson, and Ronald Bass, Oscar winners in cinematography, sound effects, and screenplay, respectively. Mel Gibson contributed to this film as an art director. Telling the story of the Japanese bombings on Chongqing during WWII, the film features stars from four countries: Liu Ye (China), Bruce Willis and Adrien Brody (USA), Song Seung-heon (Korea), and Shibuya. He plays an ace pilot who flies a Zero fighter, fighting against Chinese battle-planes.

Shibuya appeared quite frequently on TV in China in autumn 2015. Five TV series in which Shibuya starred: Tiezaishao, Ershisidaoguai, Jieqiang, Xuanya, and Xuebao, were broadcast on over ten channels in China. A number of Shibuya's fans commented and discussed the roles Shibuya portrayed, especially that of his drama, Tiezaishao.

Shibuya has also collaborated with enterprises as an image character or a spokesman:

- In July 2013, he attended an art exhibition.
- In March 2014, he collaborated with Antique jewelry brand, House of Willow.
- In May 2014, he spoke for Millennium Residences Beijing at the Tenma Shibuya's Art Space & Art Life Style project.
- In April 2015, he attended the Yinluchi Art District Fine Brushwork Exhibition.
- In July 2015, he spoke at Chao Hong's Painting Art Exhibition, Combining the East and the West.
- In June–July 2015, he did a spokesman of African art brand, African Symbol.
- In February 2017, he collaborated with the fragrance frand, RE CLASSIFIED at the project of its promotion, "Tenma Shibuya Comprehends Ancient Greek Philosophy through Perfume."

As of 2019, Shibuya has appeared in over 100 works including films, television dramas, and plays in Japan, China, Hong Kong, Taiwan, and America. Today, he is recognized as one of famous Japanese actors in Chinese-speaking regions, especially in mainland China.

== Filmography ==
=== Film ===
Year	Title	Region	Director	Role
2020	The Vindicator	China	Li Bin	Special Forces Captain: Koichiro Ishikawa
2019	Saturday Fiction	China	Lou Ye	Lieutenant Hosoda
2018	Air Strike	China	Xiao Feng	Zero fighter pilot;Sato
2017	Shisidadao	China	Wang Qiang	General Kato
2016	Geigeliyouxian	China	Wang Qiang	Jin casino owner
2015	Imaginary Assassin	China	Kan Ruohan	Tsuji Masanobu
2014	Kano	Taiwan	Umin Boya	Citizen Representative
2013	Xiaoxiaofeihudui	China	Qian Xiaohong	Gangcun
2012	Chengchengfenghuo Juesha	China	Li Cai	Gaoqiao
2012	Hushed Roar	China	Xiao Feng	Ichiro Nakamura
2011	The Flowers of War	China	Zhang Yimou	Fuguan
2010	Eergunaheyouan	China	Yang Minghua	Hideo Suzuki
2010	Tiexuejiangqiao	China	Zhang Yuzhong	Kanji Ishibashi
2010	Shenhe	China	Wang Jianwei	Jitian Fengci
2010	Death and Glory in Changde	China	Shen Dong	Yiteng Sanlang
2009	Cow	China	Guan Hu	Terada
2008	Ip Man	Hong Kong	Wilson Yip	Colonel Sato
2008	Feihuduidiezhan	China	Li Shu	Xiongben
2007	Yexi	China	An Lan	Lieutenant Tanaka
2004	Appleseed	Japan	Fumihiko Sone, Shinji Aramaki	Uranus (motion capture)
2003	Ichigonokakera	Japan	Shun Nakahara	Bartender
2002	Agitator	Japan	Takashi Miike	Shintani
2002	Hiroshimayakuzasensou	Japan	Toru Ichikawa	Yakuza
2001	Zonbigokudou	Japan	Hirohisa Sasaki	Detective
2002	Bastoni	Japan	Kazuhiko Nakahara	Agent of Porn Actress
2001	Minaminoteiou	Japan	Sadaaki Hginiwa	Factory Worker
2001	Salarymanpachinkaergingtaro	Japan	Takeshi Niizato	Secretary
2001	Aokiookamitachi	Japan	Kenji Yokoi	Hitman
2000	Kamome	Japan	Genji Nakamura	Loan Shark
1999	Fubundaisousa	Hong Kong	Zhang Yinghua	Adult Shop Manager
1998	Hananoana	Japan	Kazushige Inada	Rebel
1998	Genkinokamisama	Japan	Genji Nakamura	Husband
1997	Mamushinokyoudai	Japan	Toru Murakawa	Punk
1996	Sadistic Song	Japan	Genji Nakamura	Playboy
1996	Saigonoshigoto	Japan	Maiko Inoue	Thief

=== Television ===
Year	Title	Region	Director	Role
	Chuanjia	China	Wang Wei	General MIura
	Growing pains of swordsmen	China	Shang Jing	Ninja: Hattori
2020	Binbian bushi haitanghong	China	Hui Kaidong	General Kyujou
2018	Taiwanwangshi	China	Cui Liang	Police dpt Chief：Matsumura
2017	Sorge	Russia	Sergey Ginzburg	Imuro
2016	Youchai	China	He Liu, Bai Yang	Shuigu Xinfu
2015	Ershisidaoguai	China	Zhang Yuzhong	Dachuan
2015	Tiezaishao	China	Liu Xin	Gaomu Yiren
2014	Fenghuoshuangxiong	China	Jin Liangyan	Heitian zhongxiong
2013	Xiaobaohelaocai	China	Shang Jing	Qingtian Dazuo
2012	Xuanya	China	Liu Jin	Saburo Shibuya
2012	Shenmirenzhi	China	Shao Jinghui	Songben Wulang
2012	Haojiahuo	China	Jian Chuanhe	Kanji Abe
2011	Dakuaize	China	Gao Jin	Guitian Cilang
2011	Daxifa	China	Wang Shuo	Wuteng Zhang
2011	Jiezhenguochuanqi	China	Lei Xianhe	Jitian
2011	Xingfumanwu	China	Jia Yiping	Mouye
2010	Jieqiang	China	Jiang Wei	Jiateng Jinger
2010	Zhizhewudi	China	Jian Chuanhe	Yunchuan Xiuyi
2010	Woshichuanqi	China	Xu Zongzheng	Heichuan Shuo
2010	Chuanjuntuanxuezhandaodi	China	Li Shu	Yedao Canger
2010	Tiexuezhonghun	China	Zhou Youchao	Yuantian Duizhang
2009	Shengsixian	China	Kong Sheng	Dubian Chunliang
2009	Yangguifeimishi	China	You Xiaogang	Daban Gumalv
2009	Xuebao	China	Chen Haowei	Dubian Wu
2009	Watashigakodomodattakoro	Japan		Xianbingduiyuan
2008	Didaoyingxiong	China	Ding Hei	Shangdao Cilang
2006	Caoyuanchunlaizao	China	Wang Tao	Shouji Kanai
2005	Iryoushounenyinmonogatari	Japan		Truck Driver
2004	Kekkon	Japan		Medical Jurisprudence
2003	Kougenheirasshai	Japan		Hotel Manager
2002	Rakutenseikatsu	Japan		Cameraman

== Stage ==
=== Theater ===
Year	Title	Region	Role	Notes
2000	Yukionna	Japan	Heikichi	Ohme city hall
1998	Romio and Juliet (directed by Yukio Ninagawa)	Japan	Capulet family, Dance Ensemble	Saitama art theater
1998	Jidairomanboukenki	Japan	Ancestor & Descendant,2Roles	Mitaka theater
1997	Princess Sayo	Japan	Farmer, Dance Ensemble	The Zoujou temple
1996	Emperor Jones	Japan	Moneylender	Saitama art theater

=== Musical ===
Year	Title	Region	Role	Notes
1998-99	Kumagon's forest	Japan	Kumagon & Horosuke,2roles)-Leading	7 Regional big halls (Takasaki, Mattou, Sasebo, Sendai, Kanazawa, Takasago, Chiba)

=== Ballet ===
Year	Title	Region	Role	Notes
1997	Bolero	Japan	Dance Ensemble	Tokyo culture hall

== Voice Over ==
Media	Title	Region	Role	Notes
TV CS	Taiken PekinPekinPekin	Japan	Narration	16 episodes
TV CS	Taiken Pekinpekinpekin 2	Japan	Narration	16 episodes
TV BS	Chugokumenroadwoyuku	Japan	Narration	16 episodes
VP	Cannon	Japan	Narration	
VP	Sharp cell phone	Japan	Narration	
VP	Happy Taobao	China	Narration	
VP	China Lianyungang	China	Narration	
VP	China Jinmenqiao	China	Narration	
VP	Cannon	Japan	Narration	
CG animation	Japanimation	U.S.A	4 Main Roles	
Film	Dongfengyu	China	Fujiki	
TV drama	Zhongtiankenjian	China	Takahashi	
TV drama	Xuebao	China	Yamamoto	
CG Game Soft	Suikoden	Japan	Narration	
ep Broadcasting	Introduction of ep Broadcasting	Japan	Navigator	

== TV/Radio Show Program ==
Media	Title	Region	Notes
BMN	Wozai Beijing	China	Guest
CCTV	Dialogue (対話)	China	Guest
CRI	Tetsubeya	China	Featured
