= Tsao Yu-ning =

Taiwanese actor

Tsao Yu-Ning
- 曹佑寧
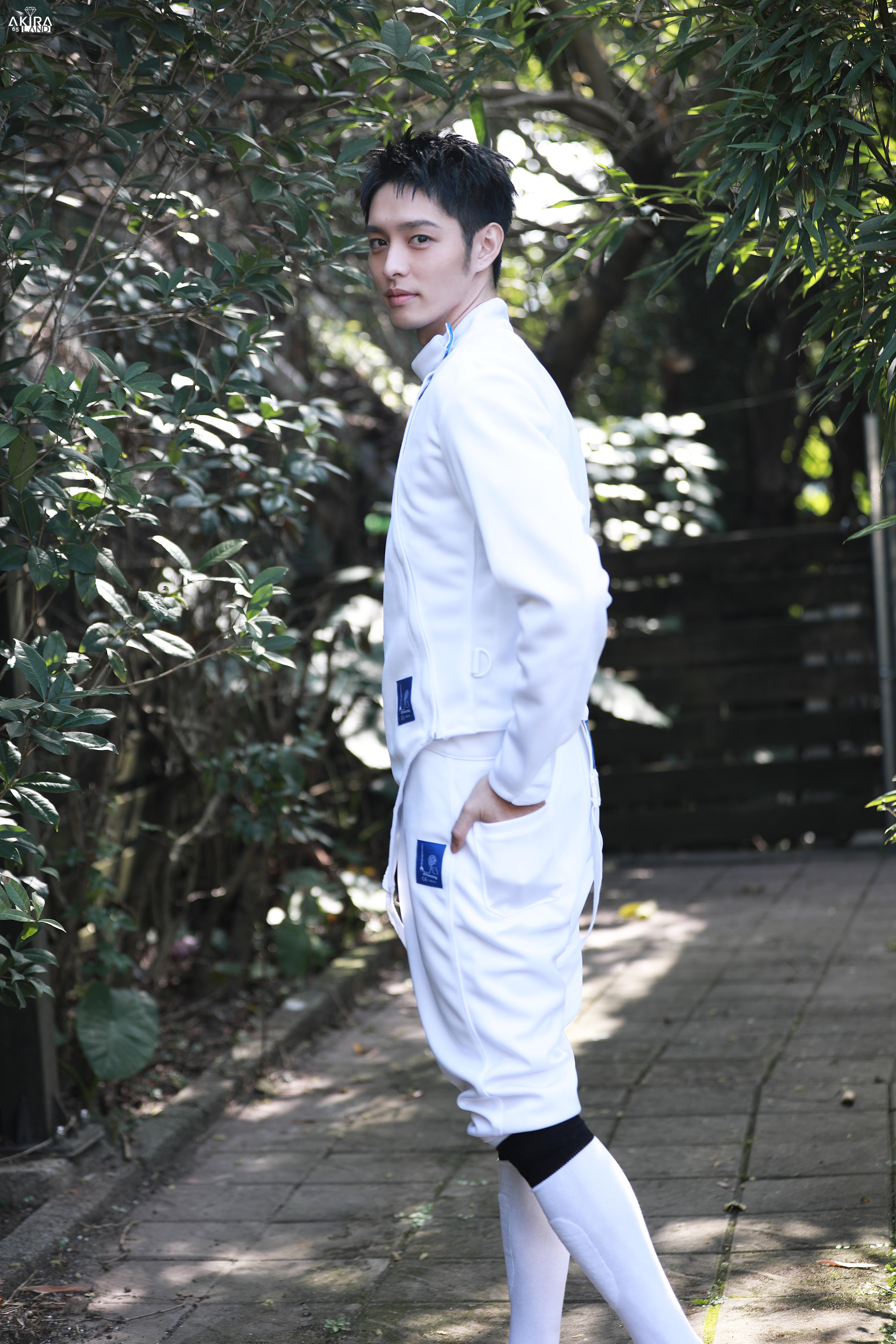
- Tsao in 2022
- Born: Tsao Yu-Ning; 24 April 1994 (age 32); Taipei, Taiwan
- Education: Fu Jen Catholic University (BA)
- Occupations: Actor; model
- Years active: 2014–present

Tsao Yu-ning
- Traditional Chinese: 曹佑寧
- Simplified Chinese: 曹佑宁
Transcriptions
Standard Mandarin
- Hanyu Pinyin: Cáo Yòuníng
Yue: Cantonese
- Yale Romanization: Chò Yauh-nìng
- Jyutping: Cou^{4} Jau^{6} Ning^{4}
Southern Min
- Hokkien POJ: Chô Iū-lêng

Tsao Yu-ning (Chinese: 曹佑寧; pinyin: Cáo Yòuníng; Pe̍h-ōe-jī: Chô Iū-lêng; born 24 April 1994) is a Taiwanese actor, best known for his portrayal of Akira in the 2014 sports film Kano. Prior to his debut as an actor, Tsao was a professional baseball player, and played for Taiwan at international tournaments.

== Career ==
Tsao was born in Taipei, Taiwan. He was a baseball player with intentions to compete at a professional level; in 2010, 16-year-old Tsao competed in the Asian AA Baseball Championship Champion. In 2012, he represented Taiwan for the U-18 Baseball World Cup. That same year, he was accepted by Fu Jen Catholic University and joined its baseball team.

In 2013, Tsao was cast to star in the Taiwanese autobiographical baseball film Kano, directed by Umin Boya and produced by Wei Te-sheng. He won Best Supporting Actor for his performance as Akira at the 2014 Taipei Film Festival and was nominated for Best New Performer at the 51st Golden Horse Awards. He played for Taiwan in the 2014 U-23 Baseball World Cup, the 2015 Universiade, the Asian Baseball Championship, and the World Port Tournament.

In 2017, Tsao left the Taiwanese team to focus on his acting career. He has since starred in dramas such as Befriend (2018) and Triad Princess (2019).

In 2020, Tsao joined the army, trained 0106 ladder for the army, served in the Jinliujie camp and is currently retired.

in 2021, Tsao participate in All Star Sports Day 2 as an athlete. He broke the record of MVP in the first season, and personally won 3 trophies throughout the season.

== Filmography ==
=== Film ===
Year	Title	Chinese title	Role(s)	Notes/Ref.
2014	Kano		Meisho Go (Akira)	Taipei Film Festival for Best Supporting Actor; Nominated — Golden Horse Award for Best New Performer
2018	Graduation Trip	畢業旅行笑翻天		
2019	The Kitchen	仙廚奇緣	Chang Ting	Web film
2019	Binding Souls	綁靈	Fung	
2020	Hu Sen Zi Chu	湖深之處		
2020	Do You Love Me As I Love You	可不可以你也剛好喜歡我		
2021	Nezha	叱吒風雲	Jack Tu	
2024	I Am the Secret in Your Heart	夏日的檸檬草	Cheng Yih	
2024	Pierce	刺心切骨	Zihan	Premiere at the KVIFF

=== Dramas ===
Year	Title	Chinese title	Role(s)	Network	Notes
2018	Befriend	人際關係事務所	Zhang Liang	iQIYI Taiwan	
2018	Judo High	熱血高校	Yun Qing	iQIYI Taiwan	
2019	Last One Standing	無主之城	π	iQIYI Taiwan	Guest appearance
2019	Triad Princess	極道千金	Eddie Kim	Netflix	
2020	Crazy Cuisine Battles	奇葩料理大作戰			
2020		失蹤人口			Guest appearance
2021	Mysterious Love	他在逆光中告白	Li Teng / "Lee"	Sohu TV	Main role
2023	Love of Replica	为你逆光而来	Lu Jin Yan	Sohu TV	Main role
2024	A Wonderful Journey	華麗計程車行	Chen Bo Wen	Line TV	Main role
