= List of 2016 box office number-one films in Taipei =

List of 2016 box office number-one films in Taipei. At present, there is no transparent independent calculation method for box office totals in Taiwan.. While IMDB has box office information for some weeks, other weeks are incomplete. Where IMDB information is incomplete, this list uses position data from the 開眼電影網 weekend three-day movie box office information, but doesn’t provide dollar box office figures for that weekend. This box office list uses figures for weekends rather than full weeks, with the dates given being Friday - Sunday.

== The box office list ==
(Unit: United States Dollars)

Week Number	Weekend Dates	Weekend’s top box office film	Weekend box office	Cumulative box office / number of weeks at #1
1	Jan 1-3, 2016	Ip Man 3	$1,688,809	$2,591,946 1w
2	Jan 8-10, 2016	Ip Man 3	$674,391	$4,373,505 2w
3	Jan 15-17, 2016	The Revenant	$689,281	$1,813,072 1w
4	Jan 22-24, 2016	The 5th Wave	$479,051	$621,062 1w
5	Jan 29-31, 2016	13 Hours	$353,697	$353,697 1w
6	Feb 5-7, 2016	David Loman 2	$940,738	$940,738 1w
7	Feb 12-14, 2016	Deadpool	$8,189,203	$8,189,203 1w
8	Feb 19-21, 2016	Deadpool	$1,400,722	2w
9	Feb 26-28, 2016	Zootopia	$702,650	$702,650 1w
10	Mar 6-8, 2016	London Has Fallen	$1,187,823	$1,187,823 1w
11	Mar 11-13, 2016	Zootopia	$835,941	$3,380,963 2w(jump)
12	Mar 18-20, 2016	Zootopia	$842,292	$4,616,520 3w(jump)
13	Mar 25-27, 2016	Batman v Superman: Dawn of Justice		1w
14	Apr 1-3, 2016	《Batman v Superman: Dawn of Justice》	$1,025,175	$5,277,933 2w
15	Apr 8-10, 2016	The Huntsman: Winter’s War	$861,946	$861,946 1w
16	Apr 15-17, 2016	The Jungle Book	$851,630	$851,630 1w
17	Apr 22-24, 2016	The Jungle Book		2w
18	Apr 29 - May 1, 2016	Captain America: Civil War		1w
19	May 6-8, 2016	Captain America: Civil War		2w
20	May 13-15, 2016	Captain America: Civil War		3w
21	May 20-22, 2016	X-Men: Apocalypse	$3,771,307	$3,771,307 1w
22	May 27-29, 2016	X-Men: Apocalypse		2w
23	June 3-5, 2016	Teenage Mutant Ninja Turtles: Out of the Shadows		1w
24	June 10-12, 2016	Now You See Me 2	$2,604,843	$2,604,843 1w
25	June 17-19, 2016	Now You See Me 2	$937,710	$4,434,945 2w
26	June 24-26, 2016	Independence Day: Resurgence	$3,556,071	$3,556,071 1w
27	July 1-3, 2016	The Secret Life of Pets	$2,006,110	$2,225,941 1w
28	July 8-10	Cold War 2		1w
29	July 15-17	Cold War 2		2w
30	July 22-24, 2016	Star Trek Beyond	$997,058	$1,309,453 1w
31	July 29-31, 2016	Jason Bourne	$1,952,000	$1,952,000 1w
32	Aug 7, 2016	《Suicide Squad》		
33	Aug 14, 2016	《Suicide Squad》		
34	Aug 21, 2016	《Suicide Squad》		
35	Aug 28, 2016	《Mechanic: Resurrection》		
36	Sep 4, 2016	《Train To Busan》		
37	Sep 11, 2016	《Train To Busan》		
38	Sep 18, 2016	《Train To Busan》		
39	Sep 25, 2016	《Sully》		
40	Oct 2, 2016	《Miss Peregrine's Home for Peculiar Children》		
41	Oct 9, 2016	《Deepwater Horizon》		
42	Oct 16, 2016	《Inferno》		
43	Oct 23, 2016	《Your Name》		
44	Oct 30, 2016	《Doctor Strange》		
45	Nov 6, 2016	《Doctor Strange》		
46	Nov 13, 2016	《Billy Lynn's Long Halftime Walk》		
47	Nov 20, 2016	《Fantastic Beasts and Where to Find Them》		
48	Nov 25-27, 2016			
49	Dec 2-4, 2016			
50	Dec 9-11, 2016			
51	Dec 16-18, 2016			
52	Dec 23-25, 2016			
53	Dec 30-Jan 1, 2016			

== See also ==
- List of highest-grossing films in Taiwan
