= Ip Man (film) =

2008 Hong Kong film by Wilson Yip

- Hong Kong theatrical release poster

Chinese name
- Traditional Chinese: 葉問
Transcriptions
Yue: Cantonese
- Jyutping: Jip6 Man6
- Directed by: Wilson Yip
- Screenplay by: Edmond Wong; Chan Tai-lee
- Produced by: Raymond Wong
- Starring: Donnie Yen; Simon Yam; Lynn Hung; Gordon Lam; Fan Siu-wong; Xing Yu; Chen Zhihui; Hiroyuki Ikeuchi; Tenma Shibuya
- Cinematography: O Sing-Pui
- Edited by: Cheung Ka-fai
- Music by: Kenji Kawai
- Distributed by: Mandarin Films
- Release date: 18 December 2008
- Running time: 108 minutes
- Countries: China; Hong Kong
- Languages: Cantonese; Mandarin; Japanese
- Budget: US$11,715,578
- Box office: US$22,108,789

Ip Man (Chinese: 叶问 / 葉問) is a 2008 Hong Kong biographical martial arts film based on the life of Ip Man, a grandmaster of the martial art Wing Chun and teacher of martial artist legend Bruce Lee. The film focuses on events in Ip's life that supposedly took place in the city of Foshan during the Sino-Japanese War. The film was directed by Wilson Yip, and stars Donnie Yen as the main character, with martial arts choreography by Sammo Hung. The film co-stars Simon Yam, Lynn Hung, Lam Ka-tung, Xing Yu, Hiroyuki Ikeuchi, and Tenma Shibuya. The film was a co-production between China and Hong Kong, and was the last film to be distributed by Mandarin Films.

Ip Man is the first film in the Ip Man film series. It premiered in Beijing on 10 December 2008, and was released theatrically in Hong Kong on 19 December 2008, receiving widespread acclaim from critics and audiences. Before the film's release, Raymond Wong announced that there would be a sequel; a second installment titled Ip Man 2, was released in April 2010, a third installment titled Ip Man 3 was released in 2015, and Ip Man 4: The Finale was released in 2019. Ip Man grossed more than US$22 million worldwide, despite not being released in North America and most of Europe. Following its success, the film was nominated for 12 Hong Kong Film Awards, winning awards for Best Film and Best Action Choreography.

== Plot ==
In 1935, Foshan is a hub of Southern Chinese martial arts, where the various schools' students compete against each other. Ip Man, the most skilled martial artist in town, maintains a low profile while building a reputation for skill through friendly, closed-door competitions with other masters. One day, a local troublemaker named Yuan loses his kite, which lands in a tree in the Ip family's backyard. While retrieving it, Yuan witnesses Ip defeating fellow kung fu master Liu in a sparring match, and spreads the news around town, inadvertently embarrassing Liu. Yuan's brother Lin, a restaurant owner and disciple of Liu, publicly causes embarrassment to Yuan as he tries to arrange a rematch between Liu and Ip.

During the Second Sino-Japanese War, Ip and his family are forced to move into a decrepit apartment after the Imperial Japanese Army confiscates the house for use as their military headquarters. Desperate to support his family, Ip finds work at a coal mine alongside Lin, who hopes to reconcile with his brother for humiliating him but has so far failed to track him down. General Miura, a Japanese Karate master, sets up an arena where Chinese martial artists can fight with his military trainees for a bag of rice. Former police officer Li Zhao, now an interpreter for the Japanese, offers the martial artists the opportunity to fight in the arena. Ip at first declines to participate, but agrees to go following Lin's disappearance after taking part.

At the arena, Ip witnesses Liu being executed by Miura's deputy Colonel Sato, for picking up a bag of rice from a prior victory after surrendering in a second match against three karateka. Deducing that Lin was killed in his fight against Miura, Ip demands a match with ten karateka at once, whom he brutally defeats. His skill arouses the interest of Miura, who asks Ip to return. Ip collects Liu's bag of rice and gifts it to his surviving family.

Jin Shanzhao, a highly skilled Northern Chinese martial arts master who once defeated most of the masters in Foshan but was in turn beaten by Ip, now leads a bandit gang and harasses the workers at a cotton mill run by Ip's friend Chow Ching-chuen. Ip agrees to train the workers in Wing Chun for self-defence. The workers are able to stall the gang when they return, as Ip arrives to defeat Jin and Yuan, now a part of the gang. After the fight, Ip confronts Yuan and gives him a small tin that belonged to Lin after informing him of his brother's death. Yuan opens the tin and finds his kite inside; this motivates Yuan to leave the gang.

When Ip does not return to the arena, Miura sends Sato, along with several soldiers, to track Ip down. After overpowering them at the apartment, Ip and his family flee and hide in Li's house. The Japanese track Ip to the cotton mill and take the workers hostage. Despite Li's warnings, Ip surrenders himself to the Japanese while arranging for his wife and son to be sent to Hong Kong for protection. Miura asks Ip to train the Japanese soldiers in Chinese martial arts, but Ip refuses and challenges Miura himself to a match. Though Sato requests permission to execute Ip, Miura accepts the challenge to defend the Japanese honour and crush the Chinese spirit; in secret, Sato issues death threats to Ip if he does not allow Miura to win.

At the city square, Ip defeats Miura after a long and hard fight. Looking over the cheering crowd, which includes his wife and son, Ip is shot in the shoulder by Sato. As the crowd overwhelms the Japanese soldiers, Li kills Sato with his own gun. Ip is then taken away by Chow amid the chaos and manages to escape with his family to Hong Kong. A closing montage and captions reveal that Ip spent the rest of his life working to spread the teachings of Wing Chun, establishing a school and training several students, including Bruce Lee.

== Cast ==
- Donnie Yen as Ip Man, the son of a wealthy family and Foshan's only practitioner of the martial art form known as Wing Chun.
- Lynn Hung as Cheung Wing-sing, Ip Man's wife.
- Tenma Shibuya as Colonel Sato (Japanese: 陸軍大佐 佐藤, Rikugun-Taisa Satō/佐藤上校; Zuǒténg shàngxiào), a sadistic, cruel Japanese colonel and Miura's second in-command.
- Gordon Lam as Li Chiu (simplified Chinese: 李钊; traditional Chinese: 李釗; pinyin: Lǐ Zhào), a police officer and Ip Man's acquaintance. He becomes a translator for the Japanese officers when they occupy Foshan despite being labeled a traitor by his neighbors.
- Fan Siu-wong as Jin Shanzhao (金山找; Jīn Shānzhǎo), an aggressive northern martial artist who comes to Foshan to challenge other masters, hoping to set up a school and climb out of poverty. When the Japanese invade, he forms a gang of bandits and is eventually chased out of Foshan by Ip Man.
- Simon Yam as Chow Ching-chuen (周清泉; Zhōu Qīngquán), a businessman and Ip Man's acquaintance who borrows money from him to set up a cotton mill.
- Xing Yu as Lin (武痴林; Wǔchī Lín), the first son of a restaurant owner in Foshan, a gifted martial artist and Ip Man's closest friend.
- Wong You-nam as Yuan, the second son of a restaurant owner in Foshan who causes a lot of trouble and often fights with his brother.
- Calvin Cheng as Chow Kong-yiu, the son of the cotton mill owner, who is interested in learning kung fu from Ip Man.
- Chen Zhihui as Master Liu (廖师傅; 廖師傅; Liào Shīfù), a martial arts master of Foshan who turns to prizefighting when the Japanese invade to support himself. Sato kills him when he tries to claim a reward despite forfeiting a match.
- Hiroyuki Ikeuchi as General Miura (Japanese: 陸軍大将 三浦, Rikugun-Taishō Miura/三浦将军; Sānpǔ jiāngjūn), an abusive Japanese general and Karate expert, who is eager to assert the dominance of his native traditions over those of the Chinese.

== Production ==
We wanted to do this movie because Ip Man was a man who inspired the world and society as a whole. He was a man who believed in certain morals and principles, and we want to use this movie as a platform to convey those values to the audience. For me, that was the most important part of making this movie.

— Director Wilson Yip on making Ip Man

The idea of an Ip Man biopic originated in 1998 when Jeffrey Lau and Corey Yuen discussed the idea of making a film based on Bruce Lee's martial arts master. However, Paragon Films Ltd, the studio producing the proposed film, closed and the project was abandoned. Producer Raymond Wong decided to develop his own Ip Man film with full consent from Ip's sons, and had filmmakers head to Foshan to research Ip's life. Ip Chun, Ip Man's eldest son, along with martial arts master Leo Au-yeung, Jun Gao, and several other Wing Chun practitioners served as technical consultants for the film. Principal photography for Ip Man began in March 2008 and ended in August; filming took place in Shanghai, which was used to architecturally recreate Foshan. During filming, conflicts arose between the producers of Ip Man and filmmaker Wong Kar-wai over the film's working title. Wong, who had been developing his own Ip Man biopic, clashed with the producers after learning that their film would be titled Grandmaster Ip Man (Chinese: 一代宗師葉問), which was too similar to the title of Wong's film, The Grandmaster.

Ip Man is the first film based on the life of Ip Man. It also marks the fourth film collaboration between director Wilson Yip and actor Donnie Yen. The two also reunite with co-star Simon Yam after 2005's SPL: Sha Po Lang. The screenplay for Ip Man was written by Edmond Wong, the son of film producer Raymond Wong. Wong was the screenwriter of Yip and Yen's second collaboration, 2006's Dragon Tiger Gate. Ip Man's eldest son, Ip Chun, his student Leo Au-yeung, and Changquan gold medalist To Yu-hang served as technical consultants for the film, providing advice on the film's story and martial arts choreography. The music for the film was provided by veteran Japanese composer Kenji Kawai, who also served as a composer on the 2006 film, Dragon Tiger Gate which featured Wilson Yip and Donnie Yen as director and actor respectively.

=== Pre-production ===
The film was originally conceived in 1998 when Jeffrey Lau and Corey Yuen first thought of the idea of making a film based on Ip Man's life. Donnie Yen signed onto the project, hoping to star as Ip, with Stephen Chow co-starring as Bruce Lee. Yen had signed the contract and received part of the acting fee. However, the studio producing the film closed, and the project was abandoned.

In December 2007, plans to make a new Ip Man film were announced with the filmmakers researching Ip's life in Foshan. Producer Raymond Wong stated that the film would take on a similar look and feel to SPL: Sha Po Lang. On 26 February 2008, a press conference for the film was held in Foshan, where it was announced that Wilson Yip would be directing the film, while Yen would appear in the leading role as Ip. Lynn Hung, Lam Ka-tung, Simon Yam were announced to be appearing in supporting roles, while Sammo Hung would serve as the film's martial arts choreographer. Casting director Zhang Yan Bin spent three months casting actors in various roles for the film. He had completed casting during principal photography in March 2008.

=== Filming ===
Principal photography for Ip Man began in March 2008, and was completed by the end of August. A majority of the film focuses on events surrounding Ip Man that took place in Foshan in the 1930s and 1940s during the Sino-Japanese War. Since the buildings in modern-day Foshan are architecturally different from the ones of the film's period, the filmmakers decided to shoot the film in Shanghai.

Filming first took place in a storeroom in the industrial district of Shanghai. Having difficulties scouting a cotton factory suitable for shooting, set designers decided to recreate one in the style of the 1930s. They spent weeks transforming an abandoned storeroom into the Zhen Hua Cotton Mill Factory, a 1930s cotton mill factory founded by Ip's friend Chow Ching-chuen (played in the film by Simon Yam) during the Sino-Japanese War. It was where Ip Man first taught Wing Chun openly to the public.

Production designer Kenneth Mak included Western elements in his design, since Foshan, in earlier years, was a unique place where Chinese and Western cultures converged. Pillars were made to resemble English lampposts, and Western lighting, chairs, and tableware were also used. To convey the culture and feel of the time, the buildings were made to look obsolete and worn out. Apart from historical references, Mak also created a glass house which was used in a scene in the film.

=== Stunts and choreography ===
...his biggest achievement lies in playing a true historical figure, unlike fictitious characters he had been doing in the past...he'd have to try his best to understand the thoughts of Yip Man, to be him, and to fit in within the past.

— Director Wilson Yip on Donnie Yen being cast as Ip Man

The martial arts choreography was designed by Sammo Hung and veteran fight and stunt coordinator Tony Leung Siu-hung. Hung had previously collaborated with Wilson Yip and Donnie Yen as an actor in the 2005 film SPL: Sha Po Lang. He was hired as the choreographer mainly because of his experience on the 1978 film Warriors Two and 1982's The Prodigal Son, both of which involved Wing Chun. When asked how he would work with Yen to direct the action scenes, Hung replied matter-of-factly, "With my mouth."

Yen described the role as the most emotionally and mentally difficult in his career. He spent months preparing for the role by going on a strict diet which consisted of eating one meal a day, training in Wing Chun, and learning more about Ip Man through his two sons. This was all in the hopes of portraying an erudite and cultured Ip Man, as well as bringing out the special traits of Wing Chun. Yen even went as far as to stay in character after filming, wearing his costume and changing his voice and movement patterns. While rehearsing a fight scene, Yen was reportedly injured when an axe wielder accidentally slashed the side of his left eye. Yen also had a masseur on set as he could not raise his right shoulder due to an injury.

Japanese actor Hiroyuki Ikeuchi, who holds a black belt in Judo, found it "difficult" working under Hung's command. In one scene, he suffered a mild concussion after receiving four consecutive blows from celebrated fight co-ordinator Edward 'Sweco' Chan. Hung later praised Yen and Ikeuchi's performances in the film, even though Ikeuchi was not trained in Chinese martial arts and was not given a lot of complex moves.

== Film title controversy ==
Ip Man's original title was controversial. It was disputed when film director Wong Kar-wai announced plans to make his own Ip Man film with Tony Leung Chiu-wai while filming 2046. Wong had planned his own Ip Man biopic titled The Great Master (一代宗师), with Leung playing the role of Ip. Wong's film, however, had been in development hell, having been announced several years earlier. Producer Raymond Wong wanted to name his film Grandmaster Yip Man, which bore a resemblance to the title Wong Kar-wai wanted to use for his film.

To settle the dispute, Raymond Wong publicly retracted the film title, stating "Actually, all along, we have called our film Ip Man, but our mainland investors said that Yip Man was a great master of his times, so we changed our title to Grandmaster Yip Man out of respect for him." In a 2008 interview, Raymond Wong revealed that The Great Master was in development. Wong Kar-wai's Ip Man film, titled The Grandmaster, was released on 8 January 2013 in China.

== Release ==
Ip Man premiered in Beijing, China on 10 December 2008, only two days prior to its release in China. The film was later released in Malaysia, Singapore, and New Zealand on 18 December 2008, one day prior to its release date in Hong Kong.

The film was released in the United Kingdom on 2 October 2009. In 2010, Mandarin Films sold North American distribution rights for the film to distributor Well Go USA.

=== Reception ===
Prior to its theatrical release in China, Ip Man held a test screening in Beijing on 4 December 2008. The film was highly praised, based on survey sheets returned by the audience. Donnie Yen's portrayal of Ip Man was repeatedly hailed as the year's best performance. High praise was also given to the film's co-stars, Fan Siu-wong, Lam Ka-tung, and Lynn Hung. Ip Man also received positive reactions from film critics. Salon's Andrew O'Hehir deemed Ip Man a "well-paced and satisfying piece of Chinese-nationalist pulp," referring to the film's heavy anti-Japanese sentiment.

Derek Elley of Variety Magazine wrote in his review, "Yen, who's taking on real star charisma in middle age, is aces as Ip, with a simple dignity that exactly mirrors the movie's own and a gracefulness in combat that's very different from his trademark whiplash style." Malaysian film critic Lim Chang Moh of The Malay Mail awarded the film three stars out of four, writing that the film was "nicely balanced with great martial arts action and an engaging narrative." Lim later placed the film at number six in his list of "Top Ten Movies of 2008." Jen Ogilvie of Fortean Times wrote, "what carries Ip Man is its dramatic charge: it is the story's entanglement in the real horrors of Japanese occupation that pulls the viewer in and builds tension into the fight scenes."

The review aggregator website Rotten Tomatoes reported that 86% of critics have given the film a positive review based on 28 reviews, with an average rating of 6.6/10. The site's critics consensus reads, "At once beholden to the established conventions of the genre and delightfully subversive of them, Ip Man is one of the most exciting – and refreshingly character-driven – martial arts films in years." At Metacritic, the film has a weighted average score of 59 out of 100 based on 9 critics, indicating "mixed or average reviews".

==== Fact and fiction ====
The film was never meant to be a true biographical film to Ip Man's life, but to broadly touch on the elements from his life. Most of the central turns of the plot are there only for the purpose of making a movie more exciting, including the scenes depicting duels between Ip Man and the Japanese, including Consul General Miura Yoshiaki (三浦義秋), as well as Ip Man encountering hardship during the Second Sino-Japanese War.

Ip Man's eldest son, Ip Chun, would have preferred the film to be shot on location in Foshan and noted the mansion was grander than the original one.

=== Box office ===
Ip Man grossed ¥14,948,157 (US$2,188,982) on its opening weekend in China. The film's revenues increased in the second week by 86.1%, grossing ¥27,812,224 (US$4,073,201) to retain second place at the box office. The film experienced a small decrease in revenue in its third weekend, dropping 10.5% to ¥24,889,189 ($3,645,112), though remaining in second place. Ip Man continued to decrease in revenue, grossing ¥19,956,454 (US$2,922,695) in its fourth week while staying in second place. After six weeks of theatrical release, Ip Man grossed a total of ¥93,740,529 (US$13,728,640). The film was China's 13th highest-grossing film of 2008.

During its opening weekend in Hong Kong, Ip Man came in first place at the box office, grossing HK$4.5 million (US$579,715). In its second week, Ip Man moved to second place, while grossing HK$6,156,765 (US$789,303) with a 36.2% increase in revenue. The film continued to decrease in revenue in its third week, grossing HK$3,494,366 ($447,981), while staying in second place at the box office. Ip Man moved to third place in its fourth week, grossing HK$2,075,250 ($266,055). After seven weeks of theatrical release in Hong Kong, Ip Man had grossed HK$25,581,958.69 (US$3,300,847) domestically. The film ranks as the 8th highest-grossing film in Hong Kong of 2008. In total, the film had grossed $22,108,789 worldwide, despite not being released in North America and most of Europe.

=== Home media ===
Ip Man was released on DVD and Blu-ray formats on 13 February 2009. Releases include single-disc and two-disc special-edition formats. Features for the special edition include deleted scenes, a making-of featurette, a theatrical trailer, interviews with director Wilson Yip and actor Donnie Yen and featurettes on both Ip Man and Wing Chun martial arts. Ip Man was released on DVD and Blu-ray in the United States on 27 July 2010. A 3-disc Deluxe Collector's Edition was released in China, but only contains Mandarin-dubbed soundtracks and no English subtitles.

In the United Kingdom, Ip Man was 2011's seventh best-selling foreign-language film on physical home video formats, and the second best-selling Chinese film (below Ip Man 2).

== Accolades ==
List of Accolades
| Award / Film Festival | Category | Recipient(s) | Result |
|---|---|---|---|
| Beijing College Student Film Festival | Best Actor | Donnie Yen | Won |
| Beijing College Student Film Festival | Favorite Director | Wilson Yip | Won |
| 2009 Fantasia Festival | Technical Achievement | | Won |
| 2009 Fantasia Festival | Best Asian Film | Wilson Yip | 2nd Place |
| 2009 Fantasia Festival | Most Energetic Film | Wilson Yip | 2nd Place |
| 46th Golden Horse Film Awards | Best Action Choreography | Sammo Hung, Tony Leung Siu-hung | Won |
| 28th Hong Kong Film Awards | Best Film | | Won |
| 28th Hong Kong Film Awards | Best Director | Wilson Yip | Nominated |
| 28th Hong Kong Film Awards | Best Actor | Donnie Yen | Nominated |
| 28th Hong Kong Film Awards | Best Supporting Actor | Lam Ka-tung | Nominated |
| 28th Hong Kong Film Awards | Best Supporting Actor | Fan Siu-wong | Nominated |
| 28th Hong Kong Film Awards | Best Cinematography | O Sing-pui | Nominated |
| 28th Hong Kong Film Awards | Best Film Editing | Cheung Ka-fai | Nominated |
| 28th Hong Kong Film Awards | Best Art Direction | Kenneth Mak | Nominated |
| 28th Hong Kong Film Awards | Best Action Choreography | Sammo Hung, Tony Leung Siu-hung | Won |
| 28th Hong Kong Film Awards | Best Sound Design | Kinson Tsang | Nominated |
| 28th Hong Kong Film Awards | Best Visual Effects | Henri Wong | Nominated |
| 28th Hong Kong Film Awards | Best Original Score | Kenji Kawai | Nominated |
| Huabiao Film Awards | Outstanding Abroad Actor | Donnie Yen | Won |
| Huabiao Film Awards | Outstanding Co-production Film | | Won |
| Shanghai Film Critics Awards | Film of Merit | | Won |
| Sitges - Catalan International Film Festival | Orient Express Award | Wilson Yip | Won |
| 2nd Iron Elephant Awards | Best Picture | | Won |
| 2nd Iron Elephant Awards | Best Action Choreography | Sammo Hung, Tony Leung Siu-hung | Won |
| 2nd Iron Elephant Awards | Best Actor | Donnie Yen | Won |

== Sequels ==
Ip Man is the first film in a tetralogy. Donnie Yen reprised the lead role in the sequel Ip Man 2, the second feature film based on the life of Ip Man. The film focuses on Ip's movements in Hong Kong as he attempts to propagate his discipline of Wing Chun martial arts; at the end it also briefly introduces a young Bruce Lee prior to becoming one of Ip's most famed disciples. Ip Man 2 was released theatrically in Hong Kong in late April 2010. Lynn Hung and Fan Siu-wong reprise their supporting roles, while martial arts choreographer Sammo Hung appears as a master of Hung Ga martial arts.

Yen expressed his lack of interest in making a third film, feeling that, "Ip Man 2 will incontrovertibly become a classic, bettering the first." Yen later stated that after Ip Man 2, he would no longer be involved in a film based on Ip's life. While both Donnie Yen and Raymond Wong were not keen on making a third Ip Man film, director Wilson Yip expressed interest in making one that would focus on the relationship between Ip and Bruce Lee. While Ip Man 2 very briefly shows Lee as a child, Yip hoped to find a suitable actor to portray Lee as an adult for the third installment.

In January 2014, Variety reported that Ip Man 3 would begin shooting in 2015 with Donnie Yen reprising his role as Ip Man and Wilson Yip returning to direct. The film was initially scheduled for a late 2015 release, but eventually it was released in early 2016.

Ip Man 4 was released in 2019. Yen again plays the lead role, with Yip as director and Kwok-Kwan Chan as Bruce Lee.

== See also ==
- History of Wing Chun
- Wing Chun terms, for names of various Wing Chun techniques.
- Branches of Wing Chun, a student-teacher family tree within the Chinese martial art Wing Chun.
- List of martial arts films

Awards
| Preceded by The Warlords | Hong Kong Film Awards for Best Film; 2009 | Succeeded by Bodyguards and Assassins |
