= Jimmy Huang =

Taiwanese film producer

Jimmy Huang 黄子霖
- Occupation: Film producer

Jimmy Huang (Chinese: 黄子霖; pinyin: Huáng Zǐlín) is a Taiwanese film producer.

== Career ==
Huang has collaborated with director Tsai Ming-Liang on films such as The River (1998) (serving as production manager) and The Hole (1998). He has also produced Chen Kuo-fu's supernatural thriller Double Vision (2002), and other blockbuster films such as Wei Te-sheng's Cape No. 7 (2008) and Seediq Bale (2011), Doze Niu's Monga (2010), Su Chao-Bin's Silk (2006), Jay Chou's Secret (2007), as well as Umin Boya's Kano (2014), and the British-Taiwanese co-production The Receptionist (2016).
