= Air Strike (2018 film) =

2018 film directed by Xiao Feng

- Film poster
- Traditional Chinese: 大轟炸
- Simplified Chinese: 大轰炸
- Literal meaning: great bombing
- Hanyu Pinyin: dà hōngzhà
- Directed by: Xiao Feng
- Produced by: Jian-Xiang Shi; Buting Yang
- Starring: Liu Ye; Bruce Willis; Song Seung-heon; William Chan
- Cinematography: Yang Shu
- Edited by: Robert A. Ferretti; Chi-Leung Kwong
- Music by: Liguang Wang
- Production companies: China Film Group; Origin Films (Beijing) Investment Co. Ltd. Shanghai Nangou Films Co. Ltd. Shanghai Film Group; Hollywood International Film Exchange
- Distributed by: China Film Group (China); Blue Box International (International sales); Metropolitan Filmexport & Lionsgate (France)
- Release date: October 26, 2018 (United States)
- Running time: 127 minutes 96 minutes (U.S)
- Country: China
- Languages: Mandarin; English
- Budget: $65 million
- Box office: $532,377

Air Strike (Chinese: 大轰炸) also known as The Bombing or Unbreakable Spirit is a Chinese action war-drama film directed by Xiao Feng about the Japanese bombings of Chongqing during the Second Sino-Japanese War. The film stars Liu Ye, Bruce Willis, Song Seung-heon and William Chan, with special appearances by Nicholas Tse, Tenma Shibuya, Adrien Brody, Simon Yam, Fan Bingbing and many others. Mel Gibson and Vilmos Zsigmond acted as production consultants on the film.

== Premise ==
With the beginning of the full-scale Second Sino-Japanese War/World War II (1937–45) at the Battle of Shanghai and Nanjing, the story develops around the Chinese Air Force's resistance against the Japanese invasion and occupation of China; the overwhelming might of the Imperial Japanese war machine taking down Shanghai and the capital of Nanjing, followed by heavy resistance and eventual fall of the interim wartime capital of Wuhan in 1938, and climaxing into the bloody six years-long all-airwar Battle of Chongqing, the wartime capital of China for the remainder of the Second Sino-Japanese War, with the remnants of the Chinese Air Force, the refugees, and the people of Chongqing exemplifying the undying resilience against years of barbaric air strikes by the Imperial Japanese air power.

== Cast ==
=== Main cast ===
- Liu Ye as Xue Gang Tou
- Bruce Willis as Col. Jack Johnson
- Song Seung-heon as An Ming Xun / An Ming He
- William Chan as Cheng Ting
- Fan Wei as Uncle Cui
- Wu Gang as Zhao Chun
- Ma Su as Ding Lian
- Che Yongli as Yaogu
- Feng Yuanzheng as Xue Man Guan
- Janine Chang as Qian Xue
- Geng Le as Jin Xiang

=== Special appearances ===
- Tenma Shibuya as Sato
- Zhang Fan as Cui Liu
- Nicholas Tse as Lei Tao
- Fan Bingbing as Ye Pei Xuan
- Anthony Rogers as Ye Pei Xuan's boyfriend
- Chen Daoming as Chief of City Defense
- Simon Yam as Air Defense Commander
- Adrien Brody as Steve
- Ray Lui as Air Force Colonel
- Lei Jia as Wan Jia
- Hu Bing as Hospital Dean
- Huang Haibing as Adjutant to Jack
- Rumer Willis as Julia
- Liu Xiaoqing as Madam Zhang
- Eva Huang as Du Mei
- Kenny Bee as Governmental Officer
- Jiro Wang as Young Officer
- Cao Kefang as Patriot
- Niki Chow as Junior Patriot

== Production ==
Mel Gibson served as the art director of the $65 million budgeted film. Principal photography on the film began in May 2015 in Shanghai, China. Filming was completed in November 2015. The film suffered a troubled production, with multiple delays, highly inflated cost that result in the movie to go over budget, and a tax evasion scandal that involved one of the main cast members, that lead to many of the filmed material to be cut from the final release, the planned 3D theatrical version being scrapped from the get go, and the major release in Chinese market to be canceled altogether.

== Release ==
The film was filmed as a memorial for the 70th anniversary of the Allied victory in WWII. Originally scheduled to be released on 17 August 2018, it was later rescheduled to be released on 26 October 2018 in order to have a same-day global release.

In October 2018, it was announced that screening plans of the film had been cancelled in China. Earlier, it was leaked by TV anchor Cui Yongyuan that Fan Bingbing, one of the film's guest actors, was involved in a tax evasion scandal when starring in this film. However, the home video release in the United States went on as scheduled.

=== Alternate versions ===
The original cut of the film is 127 minutes long and features a mixture of dialogue in Mandarin and English. However for US release, the film was cut down to 96 minutes, fully dubbed into English and removed the media partners. Different territories have chosen to distribute one or the other cut:

- Original version: The UK, The Netherlands, Denmark, Finland, Sweden, Norway
- Dubbed cut version: The USA, Canada, Germany, France, Australia, Italy, Spain

=== Critical response ===
On the review aggregator website Rotten Tomatoes, 0% of 5 critics' reviews are positive, with an average rating of 4.3/10.

== See also ==
- Air Warfare of WWII from the Sino-Japanese War perspective
- Arthur Chin, one of the top-scoring aces of the original volunteer group of Chinese-American fighter pilots
- Soviet Volunteer Group, (1937–40)
- Flying Tigers, the American Volunteer Group (1941–42, replaced by the USAAF 23rd Fighter Group)
