= Pu Shu =

Chinese singer-songwriter (born 1973)

Pu Shu 朴树
- Born: November 8, 1973 (age 52)
- Genres: Neofolk, folk rock
- Occupations: singer, songwriter
- Instrument: guitar
- Years active: 1996–present
- Labels: Taihe Rye, Warner
- Spouse: Wu Xiaomin (married 2005–present)

Pu Shu (simplified Chinese: 朴树; traditional Chinese: 樸樹; pinyin: Pǔ Shù) (born 1973) is a Chinese singer-songwriter born in Nanjing and grew up in Beijing. He became the first mainland singer signed with Warner Music Group in 1999 after releasing his debut album "I Am Going to 2000". He was included in the Forbes China Celebrity 100 list for both 2004 and 2005. At the apparent peak of his music career around 2004 after releasing his second album, he faded from public eyes to lead a secluded life for over a decade. He returned to the spotlight with theme song "The Ordinary Road" (平凡之路) for film The Continent in 2014. The song won the award for Best Original Film Song at the 51st Golden Horse Awards, where it was titled "The Road We Pass."

== Early life and education ==
Pu Shu was born into a family of scholars, his father an accomplished scientist in space physics and retired professor at Peking University. He enrolled in Capital Normal University in 1991 at the wish of his parents, but quit his studies in 1994 to pursue a career in music.

== Career ==
Pu presented several demos he composed to Gao Xiaosong, a more senior songwriter and music producer. Gao was impressed by his music abilities as a songwriter and singer. Gao founded Taihe Rye Music (麦田音乐) with Song Ke in 1996 and started to produce records for Pu Shu, along with a few other singers. In January 1999, 23 year-old Pu released his first album "I Am Going to 2000". The album hit a sales record of 300,000 by March 2000. Pu received numerous music awards between 1999 and 2000, and become the first mainland musician signed with Warner Music Group in December 1999.

== Works ==
His signature songs include "Flowers" (那些花儿) and "Birch Forest" (白桦林). He acted in films Where Have All the Flowers Gone and If I Lose You following his initial success as a singer. In 2014, he composed and performed theme song "The Ordinary Road" (平凡之路) for film The Continent. The song won the award for Best Original Film Song at the 51st Golden Horse Awards, where it was titled "The Road We Pass." "The Ordinary Road" was covered by Irish boy band Westlife in their first virtual concert live-streamed to the Chinese audience in December 2021, before being released as their first China exclusive single in 2-2026 The song received 72 million views within two days of its publication. One of the well-known song by Pu Shu is "The New Boy", which advocates Windows 98 in mainland Chinese market and included in the album "I Am Going to 2000".

=== Movies ===
| Year | Title | Role |
|---|---|---|
| 2000 | If I Lose You | Pu 朴 |
| 2002 | Where Have All the Flowers Gone | Zhang Yang 张扬 |

=== Albums ===
| Year | Title | Language |
|---|---|---|
| 1999 | I Am Going to 2000 | Chinese (Mandarin) |
| 2003 | Life Like A Summer Flower | Chinese (Mandarin) |
| 2017 | Orion | Chinese (Mandarin) |
