= Amis Music Festival =

Event focusing on Taiwan's indigenous peoples

Amis Music Festival 阿米斯音樂節
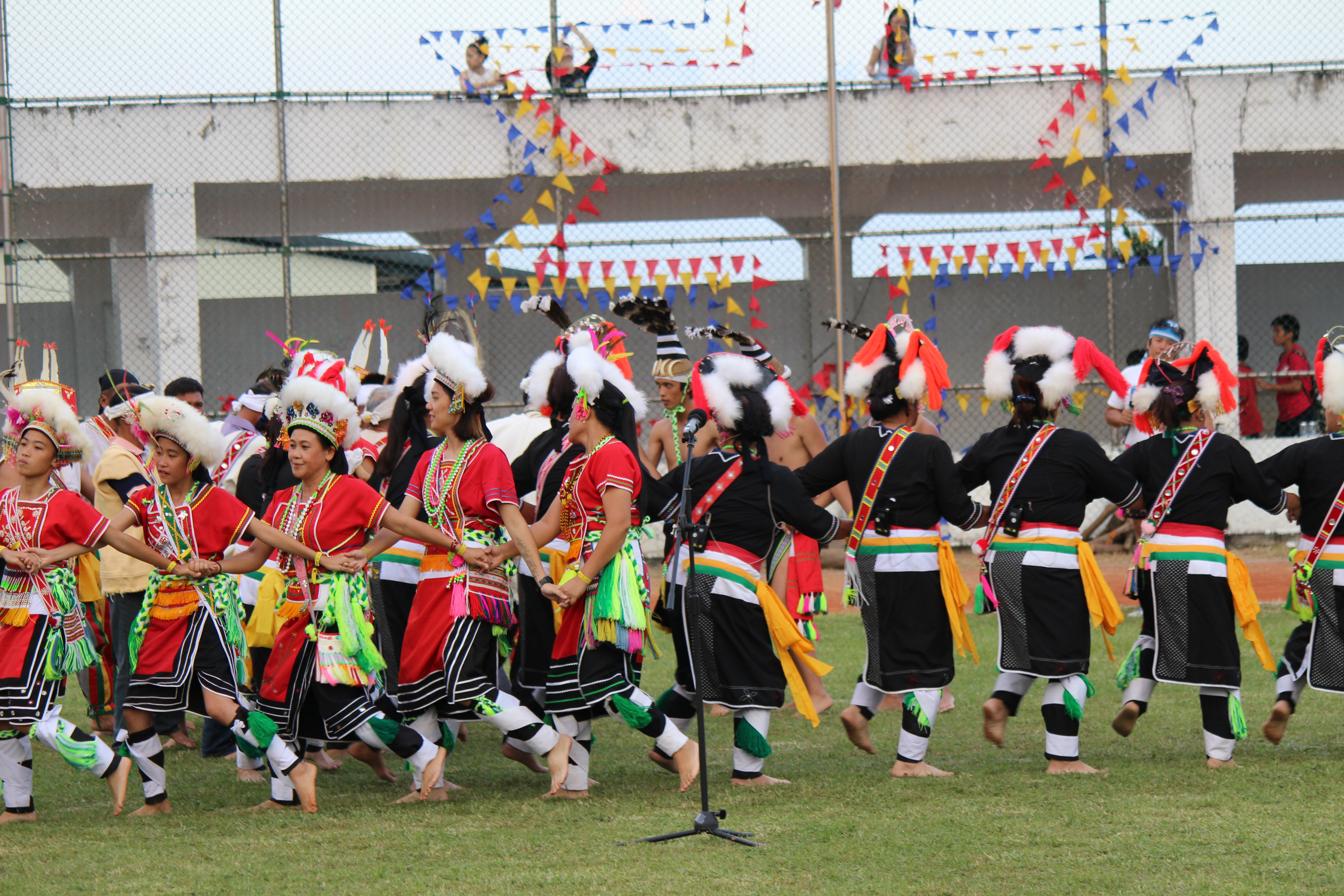
- Indigenous group dance at the 2016 festival
- Genre: Cultural
- Frequency: Annual except every third year
- Locations: Dulan, Donghe, Taitung; Taiwan
- Years active: 2013—Present
- Founder: Suming Rupi
- Most recent: November 23–24, 2019
- Previous event: November 11–12, 2017
- Organizer: Mitaidea; Dulan Villagers
- Website: www.amismusicfestival.com

The Amis Music Festival (Chinese: 阿米斯音樂節) is a cultural event held in Dulan Village, Taitung County. The event promotes music, arts and various cultures of the Taiwanese indigenous peoples, and is the first of its kind in Taiwan.

== History ==
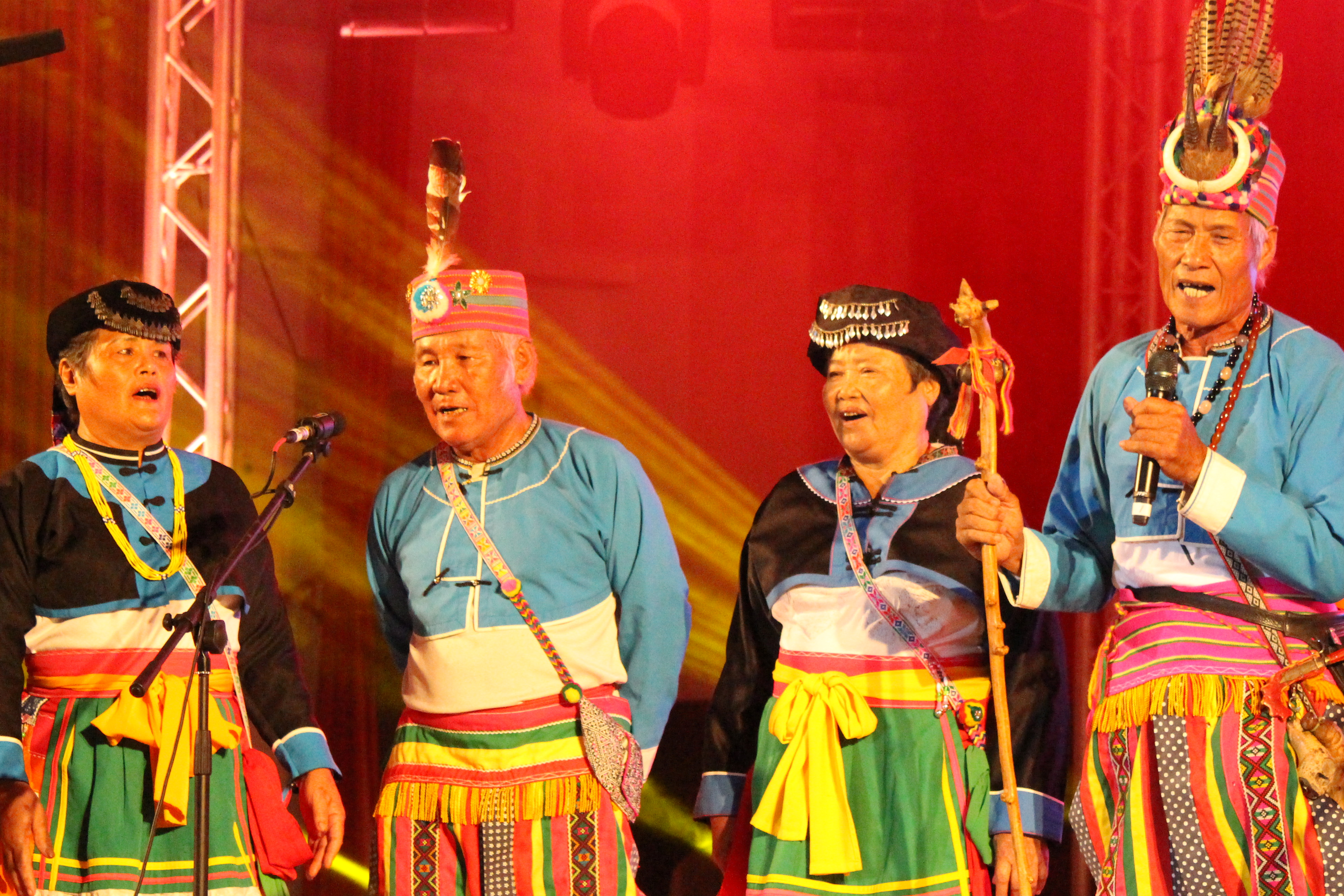
Dulan village elders performing at the 2016 festival

The very first Amis Music Festival was organized in 2013 by Suming Rupi, an indigenous singer-songwriter from the Pangcah (Amis) people, and the Dulan villagers in an effort to stimulate tribe-oriented economic development in their hometown. Suming derived inspiration for the event from performing at the Glastonbury Festival in the UK and the Festival of Pacific Arts. The festival is held around mid-November, resting one year after every two years.

The festival has its own Amis Music Festival Flag which the organizers defined with symbolic significance referring to the lands, ocean, and traditional culture of the 'atolan 'amis nation.

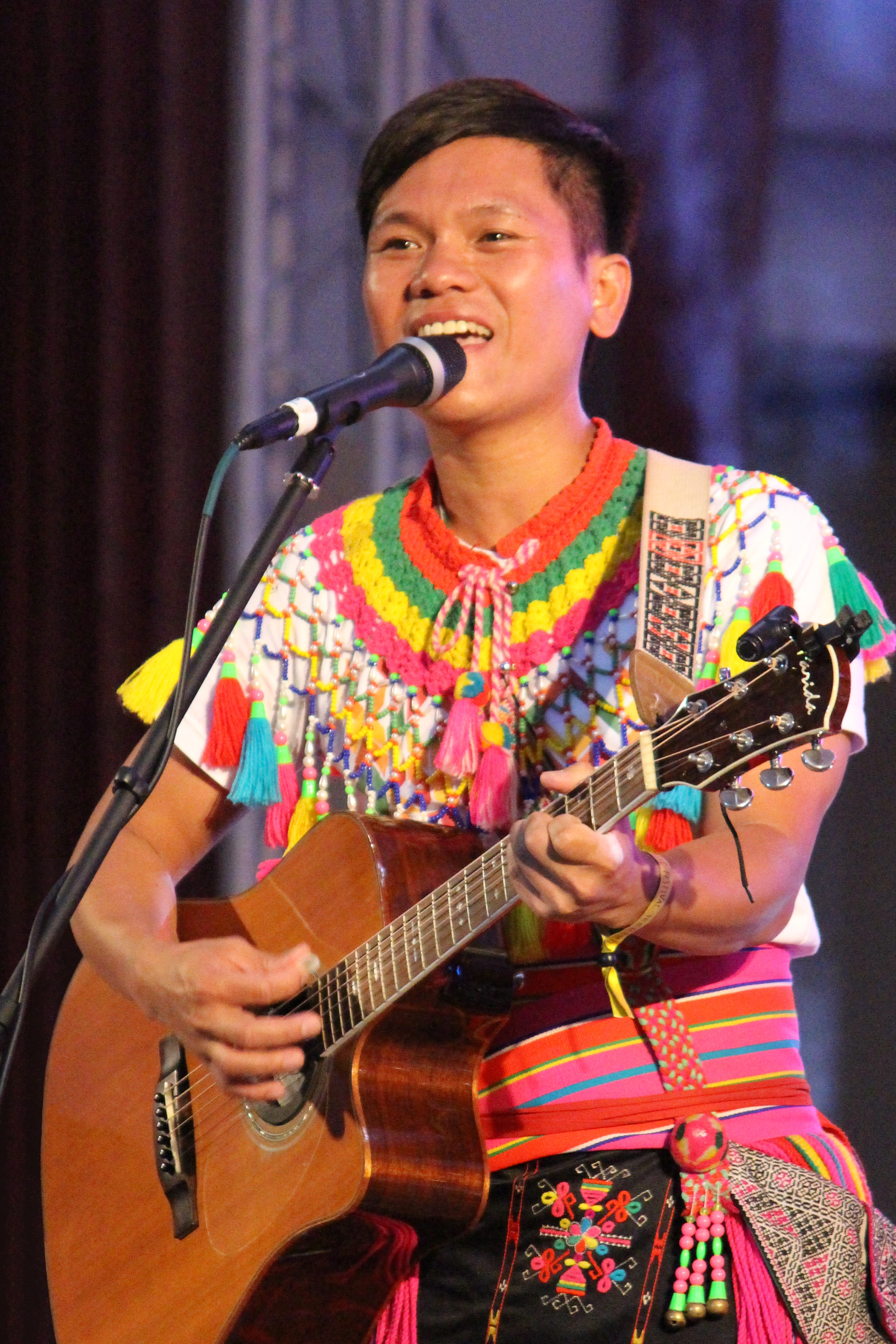
Suming Rupi performing at the 2016 festival

The story of how Suming Rupi founded the Amis Music Festival and the Amis Music Festival Flag was documented in the 2016 documentary Suming Carrying The Flag (扛旗子的人-Suming), which was first aired as an episode in the TV program Songs Blowing Over the Island (吹過島嶼的歌) of the Taiwan Indigenous Television. The full documentary film was also selected for the 12th Native Spirit Festival in 2018, which is an international film festival in the UK.

In 2017, Suming received the Taiwanese Presidential Cultural Awards' youth creativity award for his work in promoting traditional indigenous culture in Dulan village, with President Tsai Ing-Wen noting that it had resonated well with young people.

== Performances and location ==
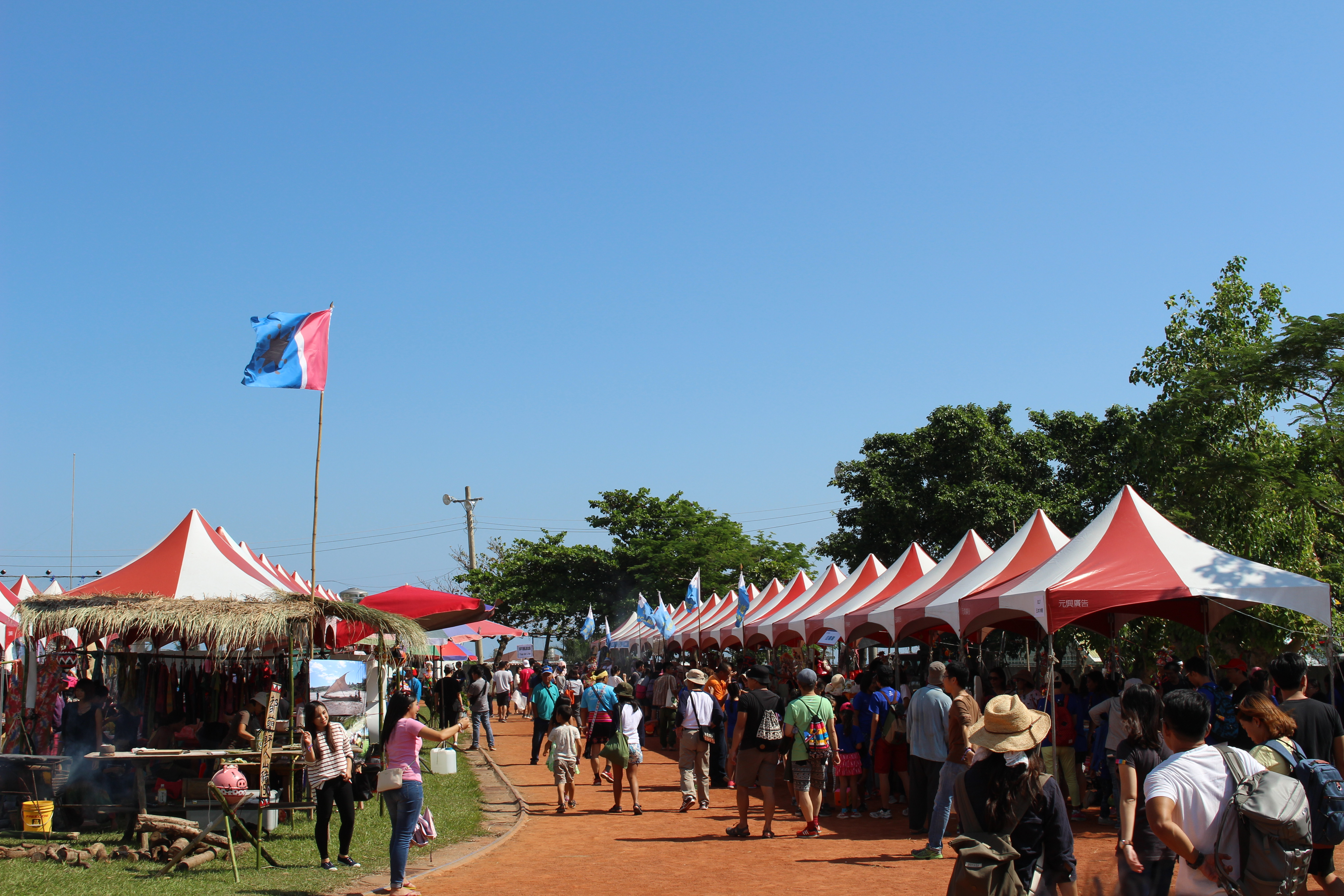
Vendor booths at the 2016 festival

For each edition of the festival, the organizers invite different tribes and representatives both locally and abroad to participate, connecting the indigenous cultures of Taiwan and those from around the world. For 2019, apart from the Pangcah/Amis (阿美) themselves, these included the Pinuyumayan (卑南), Rukai (魯凱), Paiwan (排灣), Bunun (布農), Tsou (鄒族), Atayal (泰雅), and Siraya (西拉雅) people from Taiwan, and many more tribes from Australia, Japan, Philippines, Morocco, New Caledonia, and Tahiti.

In order to focus attention on the overall theme of aboriginal heritage rather than individual performers, no detailed schedule is published in advance. Online publicity simply notes the participation of various tribes. The first festival in 2013 saw 1,000 visitors and has grown to over 3,000 in 2017.

The "Dulan Arena", which is the stadium at Suming Rupi's alma mater Dulan Junior High School has been transformed into a stage for performances during the Amis Music Festival. For 2019, the Pacifalan (都蘭鼻) cape near the village was chosen as the location for the festival.
