= Kano (film) =

- Taiwan theatrical poster of Kano
- Directed by: Umin Boya
- Written by: Wei Te-sheng; Chen Jia-wei
- Produced by: Wei Te-sheng; Jimmy Huang
- Starring: Masatoshi Nagase; Tsao Yu-ning; Hsing-Chen Yeh; Togo Igawa; Maki Sakai; Takao Osawa; Tenma Shibuya; Aoki Ken; Rose Yu
- Cinematography: Chin Ting-chang
- Edited by: Milk Su
- Music by: Naoki Satō
- Production company: ARS Film Production
- Release date: 27 February 2014
- Running time: 180 minutes
- Country: Taiwan
- Languages: Taiwanese Hokkien; Japanese; Hakka language Formosan
- Budget: NT250 million

Kano is a 2014 Taiwanese baseball period film directed by Umin Boya and produced by Jimmy Huang and Wei Te-sheng. It is based on a true story depicting the multiethnic Kano baseball team from Japanese-era Taiwan, overcoming extreme odds to represent the island in the 1931 Japanese High School Baseball Championship at Koshien Stadium (located in Nishinomiya, Hyōgo Prefecture). Performing beyond all expectations, the underdog team advanced to the championship game in the tournament.

The film stars Masatoshi Nagase as Hyotaro Kondo, who coaches an underdog multi-ethnic high school team comprising Taiwanese aborigines, Han Taiwanese and Japanese players. The team's star pitcher, Meisho "Akira" Go, is played by Tsao Yu-ning, who won a Best Supporting Actor award at the 2014 Taipei Film Festival for his performance in the film.

The film also won Audience Awards from the Golden Horse Film Festival (where it also won a FIPRESCI Prize), the Taipei Film Festival and the Osaka Asian Film Festival. Kano is the 6th highest grossing domestic Taiwanese film of all time.

== Music ==
=== Theme song ===
Taiwan version (Japanese + Mandarin): 勇者的浪漫～風になって～/勇者的浪漫 Brave Romance

Composer: Rake / Lyrics: Rake, Yan Yunnong
Singer: Van Fan/Fan Yi-chen, Kousuke Atari, Luo Meiling, Suming Rupi/Shū Mǐ Ēn, Rake

HK version: 勇者的浪漫 Brave Romance (Cantonese)

Composer: Rake / Lyrics: 林若寧 / Supervisor: Schumann@Zoo Music / Arrange: Schumann@Zoo Music
Singer: Jason Chan/Chan Pak Yu, VnP

Taiwan version (Chinese): 勇者的浪漫(中文版) Brave Romance (Chinese)

Composer: Rake / Lyrics: Rake, Yan Yunnong
Singer: Luo Meiling (Irene Luo), Umin Boya, Wei Te-sheng, KANO staff (Yan Yunnong, Xie Jun Jie, Xie Jun-Cheng, Zhong Yan-Cheng, Zhang Hong Yi, Chen Jing-Hung, Zhou Jun Hao, Zheng Bing Hong, Sun Ruei, Ye Xing Chen)
Director: Li Su Qing

Japan version (Japanese + English): 風になって～勇者的浪漫～ / Rake feat.中孝介 Brave Romance

Composer: Rake / Lyrics: Rake
Singer: Rake, Kousuke Atari

== Accolades ==
Year	Awards
2014	Osaka Asian Film Festival 2014, Audience Award
2014	16th Taipei Film Festival, Audience Choice Award
2014	16th Taipei Film Festival, Best Supporting Actor – Tsao Yu-ning
2014	51st Golden Horse Film Festival and Awards, Audience Choice Award
2014	51st Golden Horse Film Festival and Awards, FIPRESCI Prize

== Adaptations ==
A 3-volume comic series and a novel based on the movie were published by Yuan-Liou Publishing Co., Ltd.

== See also ==
- List of baseball films
