= Umin Boya =

- 馬志翔
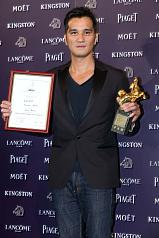
- Boya in 2014
- Born: 1 March 1978 (age 48); Yuli, Hualien, Taiwan
- Education: Chinese Culture University
- Occupations: Actor; director; screenwriter
- Years active: 1999–present
- Children: 1

Chinese name
- Traditional Chinese: 馬志翔
Transcriptions
Standard Mandarin
- Hanyu Pinyin: Mǎ Zhìxiáng
Southern Min
- Hokkien POJ: Má Chì-siông
- Musical career
- Also known as: Ma Chih-hsiang; Ma Zhixiang

Umin Boya (born March 1, 1978), also known as Ma Chih-hsiang (Chinese: 馬志翔; Pe̍h-ōe-jī: Má Chì-siông), is a Taiwanese aborigine (half aborigine on his father's side) writer, director and actor, and director of the historical baseball film Kano (2014). He also starred in Wei Te-sheng's Seediq Bale (2011).

== Career ==
=== Acting ===
Boya has appeared in a number of Taiwanese films and TV dramas, his first film role in Sung Pe Liu's Angels of Vengeance (1993). His first major role was in Wang Shaudi’s TV series Big Hospital, Little Doctor (2000). In 2002, he appeared in Wen-tang Cheng's Somewhere Over the Dreamland (which won a Golden Horse Award for Best Taiwanese Film of the Year) and played "Ming-hsien" in Ming-tai Wang's Brave 20 (2002). In 2003, he appeared in the TV series Crystal Boys as A-Fong and Banquet (2003-2004) where, for his work in both series, he received nominations for a Golden Bell (Taiwan's equivalent to the Emmys) Best Supporting Actor award. In 2004, he played the role of "Hsiao Chi" in Hong Kong film director Sylvia Chang's 20 30 40 (2004), and in 2008, he played the character of Liar #1's Father in Ya-che Yang's Orz Boyz (2008). In 2009, he acted in the role of Lee An-Yi in the TV series Police Et Vous and Justice for Love.

In 2011, he starred as Temu Walis in Wei Te-sheng's historical epic, Seediq Bale (2011), which was split into two parts in some jurisdictions: Part 1 (The Sun Flag) and Part 2 (The Rainbow Bridge). He was nominated for a "Best Supporting Actor" award at the 2012 Asian Film Awards for his performance in the film. In 2012, he appeared as Hsiang in Taiwanese director Chao-jen Hsu's Together (2012), and in 2014-2015, he appeared as the character "Canon" in the Taiwanese TV series Mr. Right Wanted.

=== Directing ===
Boya made his directing debut with the mini-series Promised Not to Cry, which he won a Golden Bell Award in the Best Director category.

In 2014, Boya made his feature film directorial debut with Kano, a historical period piece about Taiwan's legendary high school baseball team. Boya first got involved with the project when Wei Te-sheng mentioned doing a smaller film about baseball, which he had interest in because he was a former baseball player himself. The film was also written and produced by Wei Te-sheng and won Audience Awards at the Golden Horse Awards (where it also won a FIPRESCI Prize), the Osaka Asian Film Festival and the Taipei Film Festival (where actor Yu-Ning Tsao won a Best Supporting Actor award). Kano is also the 6th highest grossing Taiwanese domestic film of all time.
