= Wawa (Taiwanese singer) =

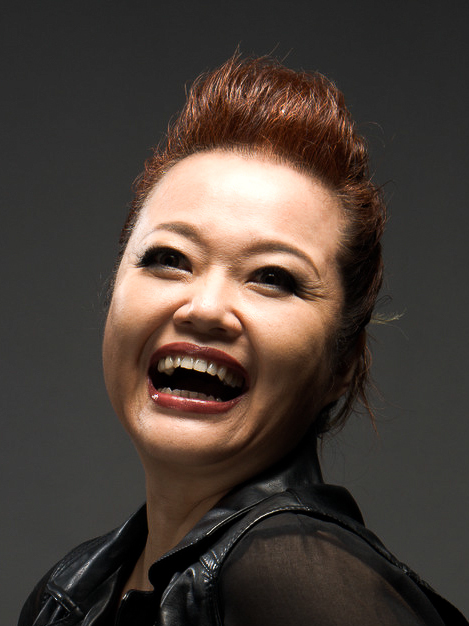
- Born: Jin Zhijuan; 4 October 1964 (age 61); Kaohsiung, Taiwan
- Occupation: Singer
- Years active: 1981–present

Chinese name
- Traditional Chinese: 娃娃
Transcriptions
Standard Mandarin
- Hanyu Pinyin: Wáwa
- Musical career
- Origin: Taiwan
- Instrument: Vocals

Jin Zhi-Juan (Chinese: 金智娟; pinyin: Jīn Zhìjuān; born 4 October 1964) is a Taiwanese singer-songwriter, formerly known by the stage-name Wawa (娃娃 "Doll"). She achieved first success as the singer with the 4-man pop band Qiuqiu Chorus (zh:丘丘合唱團). After leaving the band to go solo the peak of her popularity was her period with Rock Records (1990-1995) including albums such as Heavy Rain 《大雨》, and Four Seasons with songwriter Lo Ta-yu, which were also issued under license in the PRC.

== Discography ==
| Year | Album | Record label | Hit single | Notes |
|---|---|---|---|---|
| 1982 | 丘丘合唱團 | 新格唱片 | 就在今夜 | |
| 1983 | 丘丘合唱團 (II) | 新格唱片 | 陌生的人 | |
| 1984 | 丘丘合唱團 (III)-告別20歲 | 新格唱片 | 搖搖搖 | |
| 1985 | 綠色的水滴 | 新格唱片 | 綠色的水滴、飛鳥 | |
| 1985 | 心中的秘密 | 新格唱片 | | |
| 1986 | 歌-娃娃成名曲 | 新格唱片 | | |
| 1987 | 開心女孩 | UFO Records | | |
| 1987 | 愛的感覺 | UFO Records | 心中的傷痕 | |
| 1990 | Wonderful Tonight (甜蜜夢幻) | Rock Records | | English album |
| 1991 | The Pouring Rain (大雨) | Rock Records | "The Pouring Rain" (大雨) "I Came over the Ocean to See You" (飄洋過海來看你) | |
| 1992 | Four Seasons (四季) | Rock Records | 如今才是唯一 | |
| 1993 | I Have Confidence in Love (我對愛情不灰心) | Rock Records | "Regret" (後悔) "What a Cool Autumn" (秋涼) | |
| 1995 | Following the Wind (隨風) | Rock Records | "Endless Wanderings" (沒有終點的流浪) | |
| 1996 | 放了愛 | 巨石音樂 | | |
| 1997 | 金典-金智娟經典重生輯 | Universal | | compilation album |
| 1997 | The Best of Wa-Wa ('90 娃娃精選) | Rock Records | | compilation album |
| 2000 | Missing the Best of Wa-Wa (想念娃娃) | Rock Records | | compilation album |
| 2002 | Aishang Yuanwei (愛上原味) | Rock Records | | two-disc compilation album |
| 2007 | 是你是你 | 連銘唱片 | | produced by Wang Jie |
| 2011 | 曙光 | 福茂唱片 | | |
