= List of highest-grossing films in Taiwan =

The following are lists of the highest-grossing films and domestic films in Taiwan, by their total gross in Taiwan (in New Taiwan dollar).

== Top-grossing films ==
† Background shading indicates films playing in the week commencing 13 November 2026 in theaters around the world.

Rank	English title	Gross (NT$)	Year
1	Avatar	1113.70 million	2009
2	Avengers: Endgame	910.45 million	2019
3	Demon Slayer: Kimetsu no Yaiba – The Movie: Infinity Castle	847.47 million	2025
4	Jurassic World	827 million	2015
5	Furious 7	819 million	2015
6	Titanic	798.58 million	1997
7	Transformers: Dark of the Moon	762 million	2011
8	Zootopia 2	756.447 million	2025
9	Avatar: The Way of Water	750.31 million	2022
10	Sunshine Women's Choir (Taiwan)	741.8 million	2025
11	Top Gun: Maverick	737.72 million	2022
12	The Fate of the Furious	650.83 million	2017
13	Avengers: Infinity War	641.77 million	2018
14	Demon Slayer: Kimetsu no Yaiba the Movie: Mugen Train	636.32 million	2020
15	Jurassic World: Fallen Kingdom	621 million	2018
16	Transformers: Age of Extinction	620 million	2014
17	Iron Man 3	605 million	2013
18	The Avengers	600 million	2012
19	F1	573.54 million	2025
20	Transformers: Revenge of the Fallen	570 million	2009
21	Avengers: Age of Ultron	565 million	2015
22	Life of Pi	550 million	2012
23	Cape No. 7 (Taiwan)	534.35 million	2008
24	Captain America: Civil War	530 million	2016
25	Inside Out 2	513.60 million	2024
26	Along with the Gods: The Two Worlds	513 million	2017
27	Fast & Furious 6	480 million	2013
27	Along with the Gods: The Last 49 Days	480 million	2018
29	Avatar: Fire and Ash	477.03 million	2025
30	Warriors of the Rainbow: Seediq Bale (Taiwan)	472.65 million	2011
31	Aquaman	470 million	2018
32	Jurassic Park	460 million	1993
33	The First Slam Dunk	459.65 million	2023
34	Mission: Impossible – The Final Reckoning	453.31 million	2025
35	2012	450 million	2009
36	Mission: Impossible – Fallout	447.48 million	2018
37	Mission: Impossible – Dead Reckoning Part One	436.71 million	2023
38	The Lost World: Jurassic Park	430 million	1997
39	You Are the Apple of My Eye (Taiwan)	429.05 million	2011
40	David Loman (Taiwan)	428.02 million	2013
41	Deadpool	420 million	2016
42	Our Times (Taiwan)	410 million	2015
42	Mission: Impossible – Rogue Nation	410 million	2015
44	Man in Love (Taiwan)	405.49 million	2021
45	Captain Marvel	403 million	2019
46	The Lord of the Rings: The Return of the King	400 million	2003
47	Lucy	380 million	2014
48	Train to Busan	376 million	2016
49	Transformers	375 million	2007
50	Black Panther	373 million	2018

== Top-grossing domestic films ==
Rank	English title	Chinese title	Director	Gross ($NT)	Year
1	Sunshine Women's Choir	陽光女子合唱團	Gavin Lin	741.8 million	2025
2	Cape No. 7	海角七號	Wei Te-sheng	534.35 million	2008
3	Warriors of the Rainbow: Seediq Bale	賽德克·巴萊（上）：太陽旗	Wei Te-sheng	472.65 million	2011
4	You Are the Apple of My Eye	那些年，我們一起追的女孩	Giddens Ko	429.05 million	2011
5	David Loman	大尾鱸鰻	Chiu Li-kwan	428.02 million	2013
6	Our Times	我的少女時代	Frankie Chen	410 million	2015
7	Man in Love	當男人戀愛時	Yin Chen-hao	405.49 million	2021
8	Marry My Dead Body	關於我和鬼變成家人的那件事	Cheng Wei-hao	363.84 million	2023
9	Kano	KANO	Umin Boya	348.36 million	2014
10	Warriors of the Rainbow: Seediq Bale – Part 2: The Rainbow Bridge	賽德克·巴萊（下）：彩虹橋	Wei Te-sheng	318 million	2011
11	Din Tao: Leader of the Parade	陣頭	Fung Kai	317.49 million	2012
12	Zone Pro Site	總舖師	Chen Yu-hsun	310 million	2013
13	Lust, Caution	色，戒	Ang Lee	280 million	2007
14	Café. Waiting. Love	等一個人咖啡	Chiang Chin-lin	270 million	2014
15	Monga	艋舺	Doze Niu	260 million	2010
16	The Wonderful Wedding	大囍臨門	Huang Chao-liang	250 million	2015
17	More than Blue	比悲傷更悲傷的故事	Gavin Lin	240 million	2018
18	Beyond Beauty: Taiwan from Above	看見台灣	Chi Po-lin	220 million	2013
19	Twa-Tiu-Tiann	大稻埕	Yeh Tien-lun	220 million	2014
20	Crouching Tiger, Hidden Dragon	臥虎藏龍	Ang Lee	200 million	2000
21	Love	愛	Doze Niu	180 million	2012
22	David Loman 2	大尾鱸鰻2	Chiu Li-kwan	170 million	2016
23	The Fierce Wife Final Episode	犀利人妻最終回：幸福男·不難	Pei-hua Wang	150 million	2012
24	Night Market Hero	雞排英雄	Tien-Lun Yeh	140 million	2011
25	GATAO 2-The New Leader Rising	角頭2：王者再起	Cheng-Kuo Yen	127 million	2018
26	Black & White Episode I: The Dawn of Assault	痞子英雄首部曲：全面開戰	Tsai Yueh-hsun	120 million	2012
27	The Tenants Downstairs	樓下的房客	Adam Tsuei	116 million	2016
28	The Tag-Along 2	紅衣小女孩2	Cheng Wei-hao	105 million	2017
29	Back to the Good Times	花甲大人轉男孩	Chu Yu-Ning	102 million	2018
30	A Foggy Tale	大濛	Chen Yu-hsun	100 million	2025
31	Mudborn	泥娃娃	Shieh Meng-ju	100 million	2025

== See also ==
- Cinema of Taiwan
- List of highest-grossing films
