= Wei Te-sheng =

Taiwanese film director and screenwriter

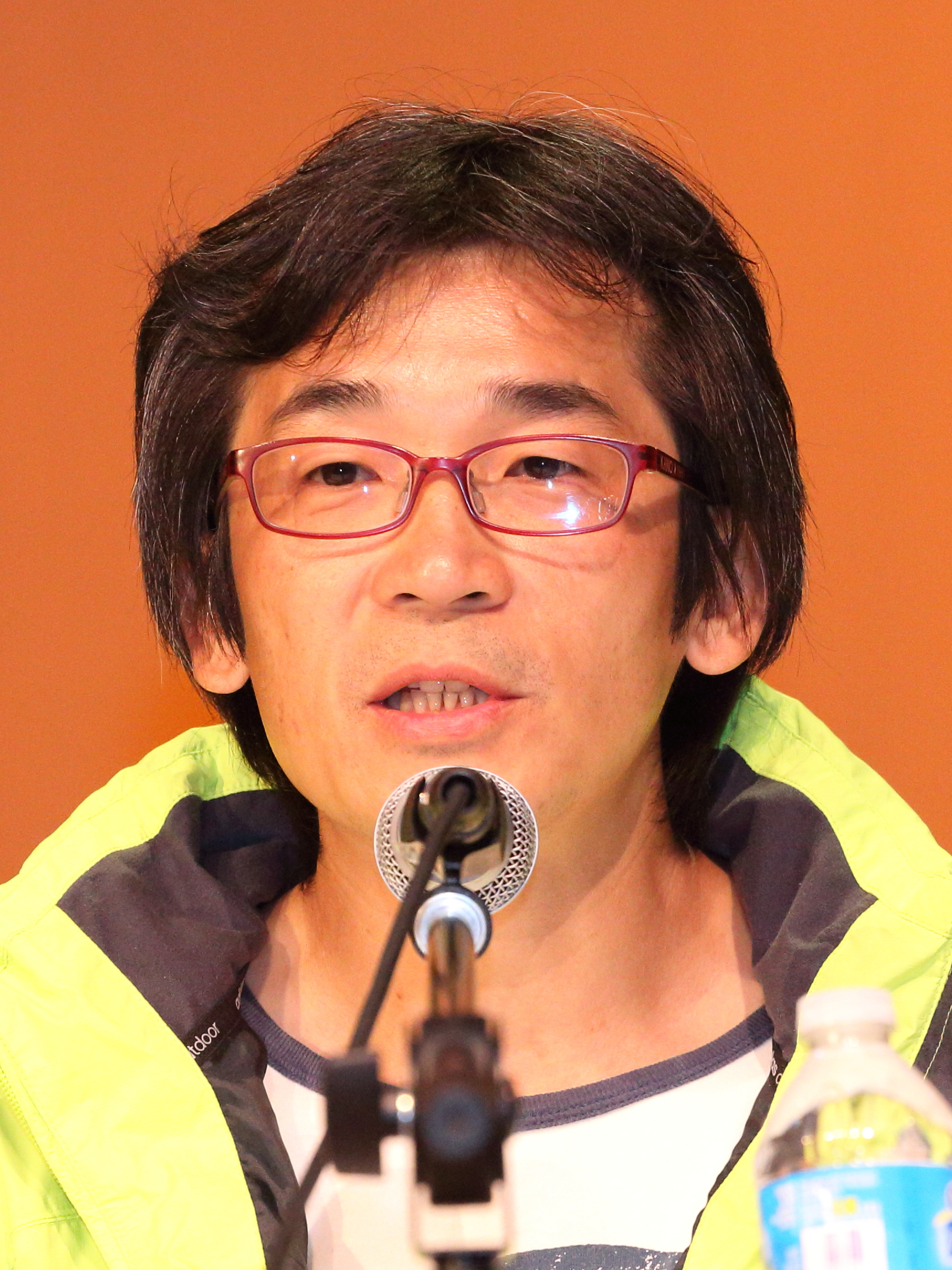
- Born: 16 August 1969 (age 57); Yongkang City, Tainan County, Taiwan (now Yongkang District, Tainan City)
- Awards: Golden Horse Awards – Outstanding Taiwanese Filmmaker of the Year; 2008 Cape No.7; Outstanding Taiwanese Film of the Year; 2008 Cape No.7; Audience Choice Award; 2008 Cape No.7; 2011 Seediq Bale; Best Film; 2011 Seediq Bale

Wei Te-sheng
- Traditional Chinese: 魏德聖
Transcriptions
Standard Mandarin
- Hanyu Pinyin: Wèi Déshèng
Southern Min
- Hokkien POJ: Gūi Tek-sèng

Wei Te-sheng (born 16 August 1969) is a Taiwanese film director and screenwriter. He directed Cape No. 7, currently the highest grossing domestic Taiwanese film and the second highest-grossing film in Taiwanese film history.

== Early life ==
Wei was born and raised in Tainan. His family ran a clockmaker's shop and attended a Presbyterian church. He spent his childhood in the Yongkang District. According to an interview, Wei watched Taiwanese films "in old, small cinema halls and at an outdoor theater near where he lived." Wei said "It was a bit like Cinema Paradiso". The first Hollywood film Wei watched was Sergio Leone's Once Upon a Time in America while Wei was doing his military service.

== Career ==
Wei studied Electrical Engineering in Far Eastern Vocational School (Today's Far East University) in Tainan. In 1993 or 1994 when Wei was 26, he entered the studio of director Edward Yang as a grip assistant. Later he became an assistant director on Yang's movie Mahjong (1996). Later Wei worked odd jobs to fund his own short films, including Three Dialogues (1996) and Before Dawn (1997), which both won a Golden Harvest Award. In an interview Wei said that Yang "taught me to be a perfectionist and not sacrifice one's vision, even on a tight budget...He also told me to use my own life experience and not copy anybody." Wei also said "Having mundane jobs that didn't require me to think allowed me to concentrate on my films in the evening".

In 1999, Wei's drama About July, won "a special mention at the Alcan Dragons and Tigers Award for Young Cinema at the Vancouver International Film Festival." He later worked on Chen Kuo-fu's movie, Double Vision in 2002. Double Vision is one of Columbia Pictures' attempts to make Asian films at the time. On this film Wei worked as an assistant director and worked with producer Jimmy Huang. Their collaboration was important to Wei's career, as Huang would later produce Wei's Cape No. 7 and Seediq Bale. In addition, the big international investment, technology and effects employed by the film impressed Wei to pursue big-budget filmmaking.

=== Cape No. 7 ===
Since 1996, Wei had been trying to make the war epic Seediq Bale, but he could not raise the funds. Double Vision's director, Chen Kuo-fu, suggested that he make a film that could win the people's trust. In July 2004, Wei read about a Yunlin postman who successfully delivered a piece of mail addressed in the old Japanese style. Wei decided to make the film, Cape No. 7, based on this story, in the hopes of financing Seediq Bale. Wei finished the script by the end of 2006, and filmed it in the fall of 2007 in the Hengchun Peninsula of Pingtung County.

As the production went over budget, Wei had problems securing additional capital; he then refinanced his home and put his family NTD 30 million (nearly USD 900,000) in debt before the release. During filming Wei could barely afford the film rolls and lodging for the crew. Wei later said this film's zealous reception should help him manage his debts.

Wei believed "that the films that hit the screens before the end of summer vacation in 2007 were all 'safe bets'", because they avoided competition from Hollywood blockbusters. Wei followed this theory when he released Cape No. 7 in 2008. Besides, Wei focused on the promotion of the film. The film was released in August, 2008. It eventually became the 2nd top-selling film in Taiwan history. It raked in 530 million TWD (17.9 million USD) domestically, setting an all-time box office record for a Taiwanese film.

Teng Sue-feng points out that Wei got 30% of the profit of Cape No. 7 ("about NT$140 million"). Also, Cape No. 7 earned Wei a subsidy of about NTD 100 million from Government Information Office.

=== Seediq Bale ===
Seediq Bale was released in 2011, but Wei began to work on the film much earlier. According to an interview, Wei got the idea to make the film Seediq Bale in 1996 when he saw a protest demanding land to be returned to Taiwanese aborigines. Wei began to study history relevant to the aborigines and decided to make a film about chief Mona Rudao.

In late 2003, Wei raised NTD 2.5 million and shot a five-minute demonstration film in order to further raise NTD 300 million (USD 10 million) to shoot the complete film. The fundraising failed, and director Chen Kuo-fu advised Wei to make another film to win the trust of investors, so Wei turned his attention to make Cape No. 7.

After the success of Cape No. 7 in 2008 Wei returned to work on Seediq Bale. However, in 2009 Typhoon Morakot destroyed the set, and the cost grew from NTD 200 million to NTD 600 million. Aside from technical problems, Wei said that he had to direct the film and raise the money at the same time, and the company often ran out of money. Wei said this made him nervous and grouchy, and he had to rely on the patience of the family and employees.

The film was released in September 2011, both locally and internationally. The filming set was opened to visitors for a few weeks.

=== Kano ===
Wei produced Kano about a historical baseball team.

=== 52Hz, I Love You ===
52Hz, I Love You is a Mandarin-language musical film that presents a series of romantic comedy stories with original songs that take place in modern Taipei City, Taiwan, on Valentine's Day. The film's title was inspired by the 52Hz whale, a creature dubbed the "world’s loneliest whale" because no other whales can hear its 52 Hz frequency calls. As Wei said in a teaser, "Just like how no one hears this lonely whale, how many people have love inside of them but nobody knows? Or simply need a chance to say ‘I love you’ and be heard?"

This film was released with special North American advance screenings in October and November 2016 and was released in Taiwan in January 2017.

=== Trilogy ===
As the Wei's 3 hits generating interest on Taiwanese history, in 2017 Wei began to promote his next big project, which was said to be a trilogy series based on Wang Chia-hsiang's historical fiction about Taiwanese natives in Dutch settlement in 17th century. Later Taiwanese central and local governments began planning to revitalize certain historic or heritage sites, and Wei entered a collaboration with local government, promising to turn the props and scene sets of his next movie into permanent display in form of a theme park. Wei mentioned his experience of seeing tourist interest generated from the film and filming sets. But the film never went into shooting and the contract was terminated.

=== BIG ===
Wei made a movie about children from cancer ward.

== Personal life ==
Wei is married and has one son.

== Filmography ==
=== Director ===
Year	Title	Notes
1995	Face in the Evening	
1996	Three Dialogues	
1997	Before Dawn	
1999	About July	
2008	Cape No. 7	45th Golden Horse Awards for Best Film Voted by Audience (觀眾票選最佳影片); 45th Golden Horse Awards for Outstanding Taiwanese Film of the Year (年度台灣傑出電影); 45th Golden Horse Awards for Outstanding Taiwanese Film Maker of the Year (年度台灣傑出電影工作者); Nominated: 45th Golden Horse Awards for Best Director; Nominated: 45th Golden Horse Awards for Best Film
2011	Seediq Bale	48th Golden Horse Awards for Best Film; 48th Golden Horse Awards for Best Film Voted by Audience (觀眾票選最佳影片); Nominated: 48th Golden Horse Awards for Best Director
2017	52Hz, I Love You	
2023	Big	

=== Assistant director ===
Year	Title	Notes
1996	Mahjong	46th Berlin International Film Festival - Honourable Mention

=== Producer ===
Year	Title	Notes
2014	Kano	(Also Writer) Osaka Asian Film Festival 2014 - Audience Award

Awards and achievements
Golden Horse Award
Preceded by Ang Lee for Lust, Caution	The Outstanding Taiwanese Filmmaker of the Year; 2008 for Cape No. 7	Succeeded by Lee Lung-Yue
