= Suming =

Suming Rupi
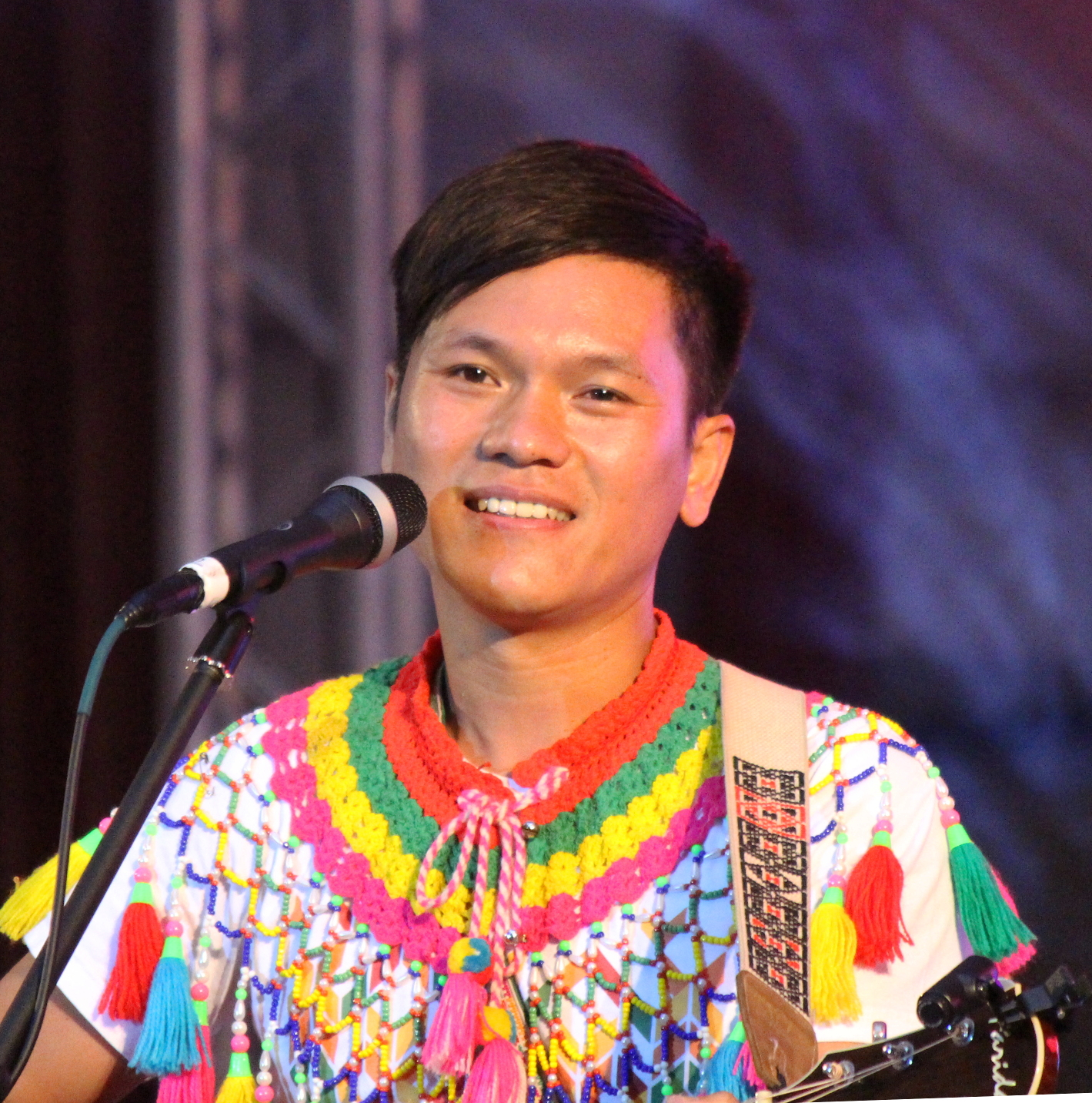
- Suming performing at the 2016 Amis Music Festival

Background information
- Born: 17 July 1978 (age 48); Taitung County, Taiwan
- Genres: Folk rock Electronic dance music Pop
- Occupations: Musician; songwriter; actor
- Instruments: Guitar; Vocals; Flute
- Years active: 2002–present
- Label: Wonder Music
- Website: sumingfans.com

Suming
- Traditional Chinese: 舒米恩‧魯碧
- Literal meaning: charcoal
Transcriptions
Standard Mandarin
- Hanyu Pinyin: Shū mǐ ēn·Lǔ bì
Southern Min
- Hokkien POJ: Su-bí-un Ló͘-phek

Alternative Chinese name
- Traditional Chinese: 姜聖民
Transcriptions
Standard Mandarin
- Hanyu Pinyin: Jiāng Shèngmín
Southern Min
- Hokkien POJ: Khiong Sèng-bîn

Suming Rupi (born 17 July 1978) is a Taiwanese musician, singer, songwriter and actor. He is a member of the "Lacienci" (拉千禧) age set (a form of social organization that is characteristic of 'Amis) of 'Atolan.

== Life and career ==
Suming Rupi is a member of the 'Atolan community of the Amis (also known as "Pangcah") people, who live in Taitung and Hualien Counties. Rupi is his grandmother's given name. He often only goes by his given name "Suming". He is also known as Chiang Sheng-min, his Chinese name. He sees tradition as fashionable and stylish, and often appears in traditional 'Atolan 'Amis regalia on stage.

Suming began his music career with the band Totem (圖騰樂團) in 2002. He served as one of the two vocalists and the main songwriter of the band. Totem won the first prize in the 7th Hohaiyan Rock Festival, which is held annually in Gongliao District, New Taipei. Totem released two albums, Over There I Sing (我在那邊唱) in 2006 and Shepherd Boy (放羊的孩子) in 2009, and was nominated for the Best Band in the Golden Melody Awards in 2007 and 2010 for both albums. Suming notably used the 'Amis language in rap style in a song "Panay, 19-years-old (巴奈十九)", taken from Over There I Sing. In 2006, the Association of Music Workers in Taiwan listed the song as one of the 10 Best Singles of the year, and Over There I Sing as one of the 10 Best Albums of the year. In 2021, a bachata version of Suming's song Ho Hay Yan 喔嗨洋 was released by Dominican singer Luys Bien.

=== Solo career ===
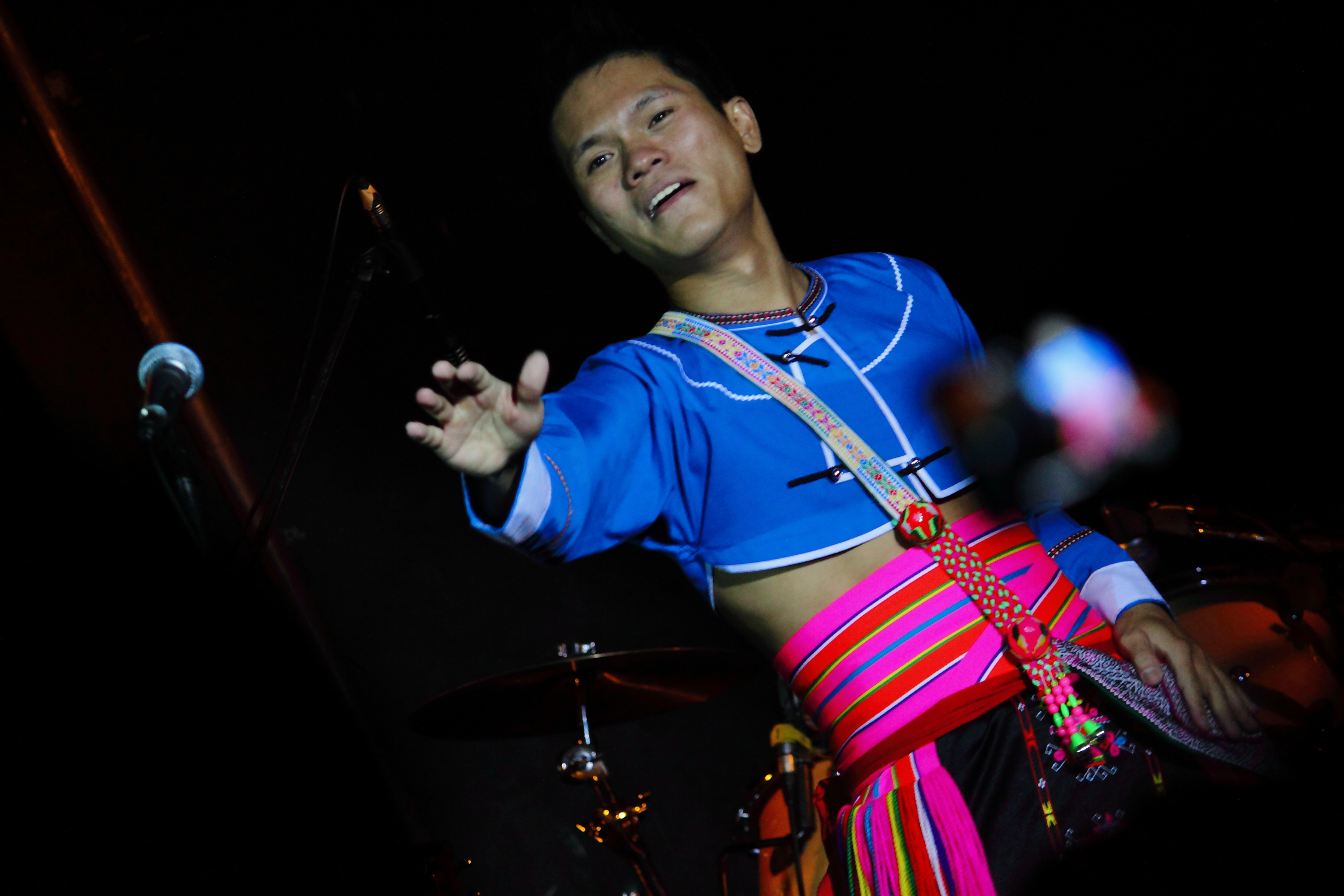
Suming at the release party for his debut solo album in 2010

In 2010, Suming released an eponymous first solo album, writing 10 out of the 11 songs; all the lyrics are in 'Amis. One reason Suming wrote lyrics all in 'Amis in his 2010 album, Suming, and the attempt to crossover in different music genres was to get the younger generation in his community, who had become fond of Japanese and Korean pop songs, interested in learning their mother tongue. For more than a decade, he has also been giving concert/talk tours in Taiwan to raise funds for the annual training of the pakalongay (youths between 12 and 18 who are not yet initiated into the age set organization) to obtain basic skills required to become Kapah (the young men in age set organizations) according to the 'Amis tradition.

According to anthropologist Futuru C.L. Tsai, Suming "is not the first Amis music album but is the first one attempting to crossover into popular music market in Taiwan, combining indigenous melodies such as Amis polyphony and flutes together with techno-trance, hip-hop, and Taiwanese folk music." The album was well received in the Taiwanese market, entering the KKBox Western Chart TOP 100 List for 8 consecutive months. Suming received the Best Album and the Best Live Performance at the inaugural Golden Indie Music Award in 2011 for this album and its release party. The album also won the Best Aboriginal Album of the 22nd Taiwan Golden Melody Awards in 2011, and Suming was nominated for the best singer and the Best Album Producer (of all music categories, with Lin Hui-Bin).

Suming also uses his music as a way to introduce non-Indigenous people to Indigenous cultures. For example, in "Kapah", a song mixing western electronic dance music and 'Amis lyrics, he evoked qualities considered attractive in young men in the matrilineal 'Amis society – the ability to sing, dance, fish and cook, being hard-working and willing to be a team member. The music video of "Kapah" also portrayed elements of 'Amis tradition, including dance steps for the annual ritual of the 'Atolan 'Amis community, and characteristics of the male age set organization. When receiving his Best Indigenous Album in the 2011 Golden Melody Award from Ma Ying-jeou, President of Taiwan, he expressed his hope that the Taiwanese audience can become "fans" of Indigenous cultures. He urged President Ma to support indigenous culture: "President Ma, we Indigenous people are 'a blue-chip stock.' Please invest in us. We will develop our own industry." Anthropologist Futuru C.L. Tsai, an anthropologist who does research on 'Amis culture, calls Suming's intervention in the contemporary Taiwanese pop music scene an "alternative cultural activism".

Besides his music career, Suming also played in the film Hopscotch and received the "Best New Performer" in 2008 in the Taipei Golden Horse Awards, Taiwan's equivalent to the Academy Awards, for his role in the film.

He is also featured in Indigenous director Laha Mebow's 2017 feature-length documentary film Ça Fait Si Longtemps, set in New Caledonia and in Taiwan.

In 2013, Suming founded the Amis Music Festival with fellow Dulan villagers in an effort to stimulate Indigenous-centered economic development in his hometown.

In 2017, Suming received the Taiwanese Presidential Cultural Awards' youth creativity award, with President Tsai Ing-Wen noting that his work to promote traditional Indigenous culture in 'Atolan had resonated well with young people.
