= List of horror films of 2015 =

A list of horror films released in 2015.

== Highest-grossing horror films of 2015 ==
Highest-grossing horror films of 2015
Rank	Title	Distributor	Worldwide gross
1	Goosebumps	Sony Pictures Releasing	$158.3 million
2	The Last Witch Hunter	Summit Entertainment	$146.9 million
3	Insidious: Chapter 3	Gramercy Pictures	$113 million
4	The Visit	Universal Pictures	$98.5 million
5	Poltergeist	20th Century Studios	$95.4 million
6	Paranormal Activity: The Ghost Dimension	Paramount Pictures	$78.9 million
7	Crimson Peak	Universal Pictures	$74.7 million
8	Krampus	Universal Pictures	$61.5 million
9	Sinister 2	Gramercy Pictures	$54.1 million
10	The Woman in Black: Angel of Death	Relativity Media	$48.9 million

== Horror films released in 2015 ==
Horror films released in 2015
Title	Director	Cast	Country	Notes
All Hallows' Eve 2	Bryan Norton, Antonio Padovan, Jay Holben, James and Jon Kondelik, Andrés Borghi	Andrea Monier, Damien Monie	United States	
Alena	Daniel di Grado	Amalia Holm Bjelket, Felice Jankell, Rebecka Nyman	Sweden	
Always Watching: A Marble Hornets Story	James Moran	Alexandra Breckenridge, Alexandra Holden, Chris Marquette, Jake McDorman, Doug Jones	United States	
The Atticus Institute	Chris Sparling	Rya Kihlstedt, William Mapother, Harry Groener	United States	
Be My Cat: A Film for Anne	Adrian Țofei	Adrian Țofei, Sonia Teodoriu, Florentina Hariton, Alexandra Stroe	Romania	
The Blackcoat's Daughter	Osgood Perkins	Kiernan Shipka, Emma Roberts	United States	
Bound to Vengeance	José Manuel Cravioto	Tina Ivlev, Bianca Malinowski, Richard Tyson	United States	
The Bride	Lingo Hsieh	Wu Kang-ren, Nikki Hsieh, Vera Yen, Chie Tanaka	Taiwan	
Bullets, Fangs and Dinner at 8	Matthew Rocca	Garrett Schweighauser, Eva Rocca, Matthew Rocca, Brian Butler, Caroline Amiguet, Kambra Potter	United States	
Condado Macabro	Marcos DeBrito and André de Campos Mello	Bia Gallo, Francisco Gaspar, Larissa Queiroz, Leonardo Miggiorin	Brazil	
Corpse Party	Masafumi Yamada	Rina Ikoma, Ryōsuke Ikeoka, Nozomi Maeda	Japan	
Crimson Peak	Guillermo del Toro	Mia Wasikowska, Jessica Chastain, Tom Hiddleston	United States	
Dead Rising: Watchtower	Tim Carter, Zach Lipovsky	Jesse Metcalfe, Meghan Ory, Virginia Madsen	United States	
Deathgasm	Jason Lei Howden	Milo Cawthorne, James Blake, Kimberley Crossman	New Zealand	
Demonic	Will Canon	Maria Bello, Frank Grillo, Cody Horn	United States	
The Devil's Candy	Sean Byrne	Ethan Embry, Shiri Appleby, Pruitt Taylor Vince	United States	
Extinction	Miguel Ángel Vivas	Matthew Fox, Jeffrey Donovan, Quinn McColgan	Hungary; Spain	
The Final Girls	Todd Strauss-Schulson	Nina Dobrev, Malin Akerman, Taissa Farmiga	United States	
The Funhouse Massacre	Andy Palmer	Robert Englund, Jere Burns, Scottie Thompson, Matt Angel, Clint Howard, Chasty Ballesteros, Courtney Gains, Candice De Visser	United States	
The Gallows	Chris Loffing	Reese Mishler, Pfeifer Brown, Ryan Shoos	United States	
Ghostline	Dean Whitney	Rachel Alig, Zack Gold, Burt Culver, Mark Benjamin, Pia Thrasher, Rachel Elizabeth Ames, Justin Little, Tim Clifton, Andrea Bensussen	United States	
Ghost Theater	Hideo Nakata	Haruka Shimazaki, Mantaro Koichi, Rika Adachi, Riho Takada, Keita Machida	Japan	
The Gift	Joel Edgerton	Jason Bateman, Rebecca Hall, Joel Edgerton	United States; Australia	
Goosebumps	Rob Letterman	Jack Black, Dylan Minnette, Odeya Rush, Amy Ryan, Ryan Lee, Jillian Bell	United States	
Green Room	Jeremy Saulnier	Anton Yelchin, Imogen Poots, Alia Shawkat	United States	
He Never Died	Jason Krawczyk	Henry Rollins, Booboo Stewart, Steven Ogg	Canada; United States	
Hellions	Bruce McDonald	Chloe Rose, Rossif Sutherland, Rachel Wilson	Canada	
Howl	Paul Hyett	Ed Speleers, Sean Pertwee, Holly Weston	United Kingdom	
Insidious: Chapter 3	Leigh Whannell	Stefanie Scott, Dermot Mulroney	United States	
Intruders	Adam Schindler	Rory Culkin, Martin Starr, Jack Kesy	United States	
Ju-on: The Final	Masayuki Ochiai	Airi Taira	Japan	
Krampus	Michael Dougherty	Adam Scott, Toni Collette, David Koechner	United States	
Lavalantula	Mike Mendez	Steve Guttenberg, Nia Peeples, Patrick Renna	United States	Television film
Lumberjack Man	Josh Bear	Brina Palencia, Brandon Ford, Ciara Flynn, Alex Dobrenko, Chase Joliet, Jarrett King, Michael Madsen	United States	
Krampus: The Reckoning	Robert Conway	James Ray, Monica Engesser, Amelia Haberman	United States	
Maggie	Henry Hobson	Arnold Schwarzenegger, Abigail Breslin, Joely Richardson	United States	
Maya	Jawad Bashir	Ahmed Abdul Rehman, Hina Jawad, Zain Afzal,	Pakistan	
Monsters	Guo Hua	Liu Qing, Zhou Haodong, Wu Yanyan	China	
Most Likely to Die	Anthony DiBlasi	Heather Morris, Ryan Doom, Perez Hilton, Chad Addison, Tess Christiansen Marci Miller, Tatum Miranda, Johnny Ramey, Skyler Vallo, Jake Busey|| United States		
Paranormal Activity: The Ghost Dimension	Gregory Plotkin	Olivia Taylor Dudley, Don McManus, Chloe Csengery	United States	
Poltergeist	Gil Kenan	Sam Rockwell, Rosemarie DeWitt	United States	
Rage: Midsummer's Eve	Tii Ricks	Holly Georgia, Johnny Sachon	United States	
Rorschach	C.A. Smith	Ashlynn Allen, Ricky Lee Barnes, Ross Compton	United States	
Scouts Guide to the Zombie Apocalypse	Christopher B. Landon	Tye Sheridan, Logan Miller, Joey Morgan	United States	
Sharknado 3: Oh Hell No!	Anthony Ferrante	Ian Ziering, Tara Reid, Cassie Scerbo	United States	
Sinister 2	Foy Ciaran	James Ransone, Shannyn Sossamon	United States	
Soldiers of the Damned	Mark Nuttall	Gil Darnell, Miriam Cooke, Lucas Hansen	United Kingdom	
Stung	Benjamin Diez	Matt O'Leary, Jessica Cook, Clifton Collins Jr.	Germany; United States	
Tales of Halloween	Neil Marshall, Darren Lynn Bousman, Axelle Carolyn	Grace Phipps, Booboo Stewart, Adrienne Barbeau	United States	Comedy horror
Tarot	Jose Poernomo	Shandy Aulia, Boy William, Sara Wijayanto, Aurélie Moeremans	Indonesia	
Thane of East County	Jesse Keller	Carr Cavender, Molly Beucher, Connor Sullivan, Karl Backus, Joshua Alan Jones, Ron Christopher Jones, Brian Patrick Butler	United States	
Tremors 5: Bloodlines	Don Michael Paul	Michael Gross, Jamie Kennedy, Pearl Thusi	United States; South Africa	
The Abandoned	Eytan Rockaway	Jason Patric, Louisa Krause, Mark Margolis	United States	
The Invitation	Karyn Kusama	Logan Marshall-Green, Tammy Blanchard, Michiel Huisman	United States	
The Lazarus Effect	David Gelb	Olivia Wilde, Mark Duplass, Donald Glover	United States	
The Tag-Along	Cheng Wei-hao	Hsu Wei-ning, River Huang, Liu Yin-shang	Taiwan	
The Visit	M. Night Shyamalan	Kathryn Hahn, Deanna Dunagan, Peter McRobbie	United States	
Volumes of Blood	[various directors]		United States	
We Are Still Here	Ted Geoghegan	Barbara Crampton, Andrew Sensenig, Lisa Marie	United States	
The Witch	Robert Eggers	Ralph Ineson, Kate Dickie, Harvey Scrimshaw	United States; Canada	
The Woman in Black 2: Angel of Death	Tom Harper	Phoebe Fox, Helen McCrory, Jeremy Irvine	Canada; United Kingdom	
Z Island	Hiroshi Shinagawa	Show Aikawa, Sawa Suzuki, Yūichi Kimura	Japan	
