= Chiang Yi-ning =

Taiwanese film editor

- 江翊寧
- Born: Chiang Yi-ning; Taiwan
- Education: Kun Shan University
- Occupation: Film editor
- Years active: 2011–present
- Spouse: Shieh Meng-ju

Chiang Yi-ning (Chinese: 江翊寧) is a Taiwanese film editor. She won Best Editing in the 14th Taipei Film Awards for Cha Cha for Twins (2012), and worked on the Netflix crime series The Victims' Game (2020–2024) and the PTS horror series Detention (2020), which earned her nominations for Best Editing for a Drama Series in the 55th and 56th Golden Bell Awards.

== Biography ==
Chiang graduated from the Department of Motion Pictures and Videos, Kun Shan University. After graduation, she worked at Central Motion Pictures Corporation before establishing her own workshop. She made her editing debut with the 2011 television movie Life of Never End Co., Ltd., for which she received a nomination for Best Editing in a Television Show in the 46th Golden Bell Awards. In 2012, Chiang edited the comedy film Cha Cha for Twins, winning Best Editing in the 14th Taipei Film Awards. She also worked on the romance film When a Wolf Falls in Love with a Sheep that same year, receiving an Outstanding Artistic Contribution Award in the 15th Taipei Film Awards along with the rest of the crew. The following year, she edited the musical comedy The Rooftop, directed by and starring Jay Chou, describing the experience as "hectic". She continued her work as an editor for the 2014 action film Black & White: The Dawn of Justice, the 2015 horror film The Laundryman, and the 2018 romance film More than Blue, which became the highest-grossing Taiwanese film of the year. In 2019, Chiang worked on the PTS horror thriller series Green Door and the Netflix action comedy series Triad Princess, produced by the production house co-founded by Chiang and her husband Shieh Meng-ju. In 2020, she edited the Netflix crime series The Victims' Game with Shieh, earning a nomination for Best Editing for a Drama Series in the 55th Golden Bell Awards. That same year, Chiang edited the PTS horror series Detention on her own, receiving another nomination for Best Editing for a Drama Series in the 56th Golden Bell Awards. She also edited More Than Blue: The Series, a Netflix remake of the 2018 film, and contributed to Arvin Chen's 2022 romance film Mama Boy, which starred Vivian Hsu and Kai Ko. In 2024, Chiang co-edited the horror comedy film Dead Talents Society with Shieh.

== Personal life ==
Chiang is married to fellow film editor Shieh Meng-ju with whom she co-founded a production house.

== Filmography ==
=== Film ===
Year	Title	Notes
2012	Cha Cha for Twins	
2012	When a Wolf Falls in Love with a Sheep	
2013	The Rooftop	
2014	Black & White: The Dawn of Justice	
2015	The Laundryman	
2018	More than Blue	
2019	It's a Mad, Mad, Mad, Mad Show	
2022	Mama Boy	
2024	Dead Talents Society	

=== Television ===
Year	Title	Notes
2011	Life of Never End Co., Ltd.	Television movie
2019	Green Door	
2019	Triad Princess	
2020–2024	The Victims' Game	
2020	Detention	
2021	More Than Blue: The Series	
2022–2023	On Marriage	

== Awards and nominations ==
Year	Award	Category	Work	Result	Ref.
2011	46th Golden Bell Awards	Best Editing in a Television Show	Life of Never End Co., Ltd.	Nominated	
2012	14th Taipei Film Awards	Best Editing	Cha Cha for Twins	Won	
2013	15th Taipei Film Awards	Outstanding Artistic Contribution	When a Wolf Falls in Love with a Sheep	Won	
2020	55th Golden Bell Awards	Best Editing for a Drama Series	The Victims' Game	Nominated	
2021	56th Golden Bell Awards	Best Editing for a Drama Series	Detention	Nominated	
