= Shieh Meng-ju =

Taiwanese film editor

- 解孟儒
- Born: Shieh Meng-ju; Taiwan
- Education: National Taiwan University of Arts (BFA)
- Occupation: Film editor
- Years active: 2012–present
- Spouse: Chiang Yi-ning

Shieh Meng-ju (Chinese: 解孟儒) is a Taiwanese film editor who received four Golden Horse Awards nominations and won Best Film Editing with The Soul (2021) in the 58th Golden Horse Awards. In 2025, he made his directorial debut with Mudborn.

== Early life and education ==
Shieh attended National Magong High School in Penghu County, where he focused on science subjects. He intended to pursue electronics and photonics in university, but changed his mind after producing the graduation video of his class during the final days of high school. The experience sparked his interest in filmmaking, and he decided to pursue studies in film at university instead. In order to gain admission into a film major, he studied extra hard and achieved a score of 65 on the General Scholastic Ability Test. Despite his father's desire for him to attend a more prestigious university or program, Shieh remained determined and enrolled in National Taiwan University of Arts to study film. Initially interested in directing, Shieh's perspective shifted after directing his graduation project and developed a fascination with the process of post-production editing.

== Career ==
After graduating from NTUA with a Bachelor of Fine Arts, Shieh joined Central Motion Picture Corporation and began working as a film editor. He used Adobe Premiere as his primary editing software. He also directed short film The Seventh Day, in 2007, which earned him a prize in the student slate of Golden Harvest Award.

In 2017, Shieh gained recognition as the editor of Cheng Wei-hao's horror film The Tag-Along 2, winning Best Editing in the 21st Taipei Film Awards. He continued working as an editor for John Hsu's horror film Detention in 2019, which earned him nominations for Best Film Editing in the 56th Golden Horse Awards and Best Editing in the 22nd Taipei Film Awards. Shieh also collaborated with Lee Huey to co-edit the Netflix action comedy series Triad Princess, marking the beginning of their frequent collaboration. The following year, he edited the Netflix crime thriller series The Victims' Game, receiving a nomination for Best Editing for a Drama Series in the 55th Golden Bell Awards.

Shieh reunited with Cheng Wei-hao to edit the sci-fi film The Soul in 2021, which won him the Best Film Editing in the 58th Golden Horse Awards. He also co-edited the crime thriller series Danger Zone and the crime mystery film Bad Education with Lee in subsequent years. The duo received nominations for Best Editing for a Drama Series in the 57th Golden Bell Awards and Best Film Editing in the 59th Golden Horse Awards, respectively. In 2023, Shieh edited the Netflix crime mystery series Copycat Killer and the medical film Eye of the Storm, garnering nominations for Best Editing for a Drama Series in the 58th Golden Bell Awards and Best Film Editing at the 60th Golden Horse Awards, respectively. The following year, Shieh edited Dead Talents Society, another horror film also directed by John Hsu. In 2025, he made his directorial debut with the horror film Mudborn.

== Personal life ==
Shieh is married to fellow film editor Chiang Yi-ning, with whom he co-founded a production house.

== Filmography ==
=== Film ===
==== As director ====
Year	Title	Notes
2025	Mudborn	

==== As editor ====
Year	Title	Notes
2012	Baseballove	
2013	Rock Me To The Moon	
2014	Endless Nights in Aurora	
2015	Song of the Reed	
2015	The Laundryman	
2017	The Tag-Along 2	
2018	The Tag-Along: The Devil Fish	
2019	The Gangs, The Oscars, and The Walking Dead	
2019	The Last Thieves	
2019	Detention	
2021	The Soul	
2022	Bad Education	
2023	Eye of the Storm	
2024	Dead Talents Society	

=== Television ===
Year	Title	Notes
2017	Midnight Diner	
2019	Green Door	
2019	Triad Princess	
2020	The Victims' Game	
2021	Danger Zone	
2023	Copycat Killer	

== Awards and nominations ==
Year	Award	Category	Work	Result	Ref.
2019	21st Taipei Film Awards.	Best Editing	The Tag-Along 2	Won	
2019	56th Golden Horse Awards	Best Film Editing	Detention	Nominated	
2020	22nd Taipei Film Awards	Best Editing	Detention	Nominated	
2020	55th Golden Bell Awards	Best Editing for a Drama Series	The Victims' Game	Nominated	
2021	58th Golden Horse Awards	Best Film Editing	The Soul	Won	
2022	57th Golden Bell Awards	Best Editing for a Drama Series	Danger Zone	Nominated	
2022	59th Golden Horse Awards	Best Film Editing	Bad Education	Nominated	
2023	25th Taipei Film Awards	Best Editing	Bad Education	Nominated	
2023	25th Taipei Film Awards	Best Editing	Eye of the Storm	Nominated	
2023	60th Golden Horse Awards	Best Film Editing	Eye of the Storm	Nominated	
2023	58th Golden Bell Awards	Best Editing for a Drama Series	Copycat Killer	Nominated	
