= Jasper Liu =

Taiwanese actor, model, and musician

- 劉以豪
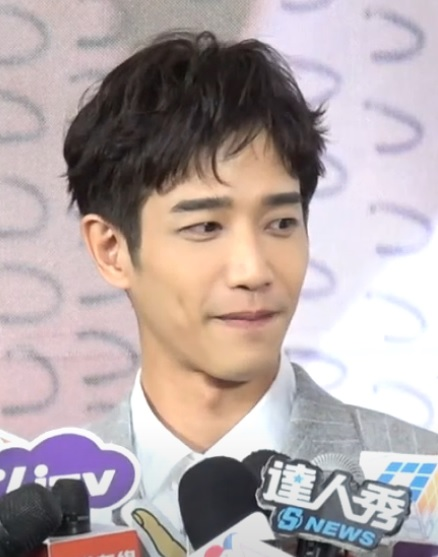
- Liu in 2020
- Born: Liu Yi-hao; August 12, 1986 (age 40); Taipei, Taiwan
- Other name: Ryu
- Education: Dayeh University (BFA)
- Occupations: Actor; model; singer
- Years active: 2008–present
- Musical career
- Genre: Mandopop
- Instruments: Guitar; vocals
- Labels: Jasper Liu Studio & Pourquoi Pas Music (2019–present); Eelin Entertainment (2009–2019)
- Formerly of: Morning Call

Chinese name
- Traditional Chinese: 劉以豪
- Simplified Chinese: 刘以豪
- Hanyu Pinyin: Líu Yǐháo
- Yale Romanization: Làu Yíh-hòu
- Jyutping: Lau^{4} Ji^{5}-hou^{4}
- Hokkien POJ: Liû Í-hô

Jasper Liu Yi-hao (Chinese: 劉以豪; born August 12, 1986) is a Taiwanese actor, model, and musician. Liu started out as a model before crossing over to acting and gaining recognition across Taiwan and other parts of Asia. Some of his notable works include More than Blue (2018), Before We Get Married (2019), Triad Princess (2019), and Pleasantly Surprised (2014).

From 2009 to 2016, Liu was a member of the electronic post-rock band Morning Call, playing guitar and backup vocals. He released his debut extended play U on September 4, 2020.

== Early life ==
Liu was born on August 12, 1986, in Taipei, Taiwan. He has one older sister and is the younger cousin of actor Angus Hsieh, who is best known for starring in the drama The Outsiders (2004). Liu attended and graduated from Dayeh University, majoring in visual design.

Liu's father highly influenced his life. His father was a swimmer and volleyball player in his youth, his healthy and active lifestyle encouraged Liu to workout regularly and body build his physique during his late teens. His father also played the guitar and influenced Liu to take up the instrument himself.

Liu has said one of the reasons he entered show business is because he often felt over shadowed by his father and older sister who both hold higher college degrees than him. Though a fair student, he was never able to beat his sister at school and sometimes barely passed his grades. Although his mother would help him cover up his bad grades from his father, he was also never a student that needed to attend tutoring school. He has said that instead of studying for his tests he would spend time in his hobby of drawing or painting.

2010 was one of Liu's lowest and most depressing year in his life. Besides receiving few work offers, his grandmother died, his mother battled breast cancer, his older sister suffered high blood pressure and his pet Pomeranian dog "ChiChi" that he'd raised for 17 years (and often referred to as his first girlfriend) died.

The turning point in his life and the start of his career came in 2011 when he was cast in a minor role in the idol drama In Time with You. Although naturally straight haired he decided to keep the curly permed look of his character "Mei Nam" after filming of the drama completed since the curly hair style had become his signature look.

== Career ==
=== Modeling ===
==== 2008–2010: Pre-debut ====
During Liu's senior year in University, he entered the "2008 Eelin Male Model Search" contest which he came in 3rd place. Liu's father was highly against him entering showbiz as he was unfamiliar with the entertainment industry, but Liu pleaded with his father to give him a 2-year time period in the industry. He was signed to the agency, but found little success in his first three years as a model earning an average monthly salary of NT$20,000 (estimated US$658.00). In 2011 his modeling career took off after starring as "Mei Nam" in the 2011 idol drama In Time with You where he had to perm his naturally straight hair into short curls. Soon he was known for his signature curly hair which resembled the top of a broccoli head giving him the nickname "Village Chief of Broccoli Village" and quickly became a popular male model in demand in Taiwan, Hong Kong, Japan and Korea, walking the runways for major fashion designers and appearing in magazines such as FHM, Vogue, Harper's Bazaar Magazine, and GQ.

=== Acting and popularity ===
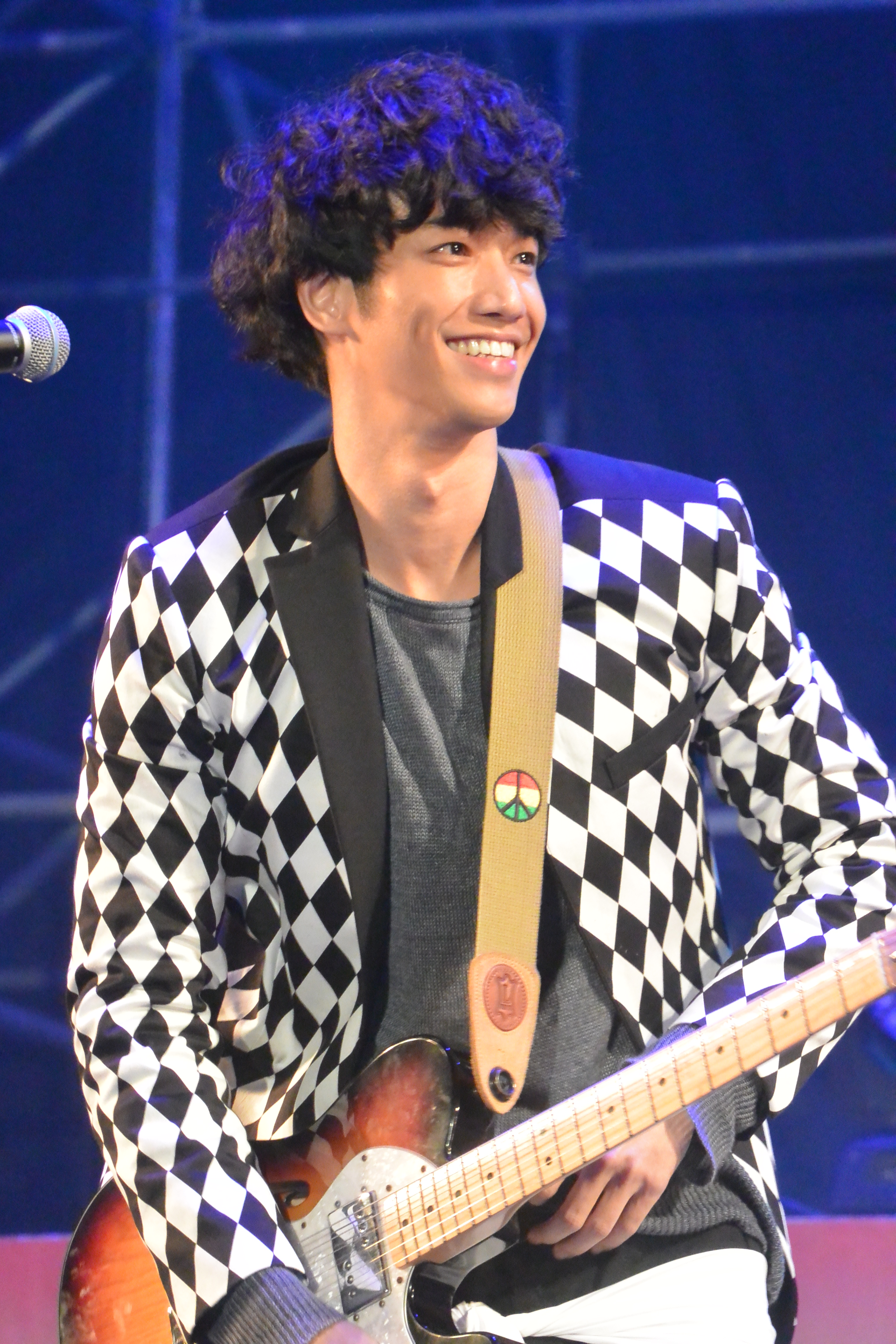
Jasper Liu in December 2013, sporting his signature "broccoli" curly hair.

==== 2011–2012: Acting debut ====
After playing non-credited roles and starring in micro films Liu's big break came in 2011, when he starred in the minor supporting role as "Mei Nam" in the popular GTV drama In Time with You, playing a high school classmate to lead actors Ariel Lin and Bolin Chen. His character was known as the handsome male student with curly hair. After recognition and success of In Time with You, Liu decided to keep the curly hair look of his character which would eventually become his signature look in the industry, and continued to play supporting roles in idol dramas, such as 2012's Once Upon a Love in a small cameo role and the teen comedy drama Confucius as one of the rebellious high school students.

==== 2013: The Patisserie with No Name ====
In 2013, Liu landed his first male leading role in PTS's critically acclaimed and award-nominated drama The Patisserie with No Name as "Allen", a stranded backpacker, who accidentally stumbles into a small French pastry shop while trying to recover his stolen belongings and then requests to stay at the pastry shop by working for room and board. He also appeared in IUUI as "Luo Jia He", a man who falls in love with a girl who was raised like a sibling to his character.

In 2014, his popularity crossed over to Japan when he starred as a foreign exchange high school student in one episode of NTV's franchised mystery drama, Kindaichi Case Files. Even though Liu knows some Japanese, his voice was dubbed by a Japanese voice actor in the drama.

==== 2014: Pleasantly Surprised and film debut ====
His acting career as a leading man continued to rise in 2014 when he signed with Taiwan cable network Sanlih E-Television to star in their dramas. Liu's first project with Sanlih was 2014's SETTV's romantic comedy Pleasantly Surprised, opposite Taiwanese model, singer and actress Puff Kuo. Wanting to go for a more mature look, he cropped off his signature curly hair for his role as "Louis Fu Zi Jie", a skilled French chef who returns home, reconnects and falls in love with his childhood friend "Du Kai Qi", played by Kuo. Liu and Kuo's chemistry as a screen couple was successful and well received. The two went on to win the "Best Kiss" award at the 2014 Sanlih Drama Awards.

That same year, two of Liu's theatrical films that were filmed in 2013 were released in theaters. In October 2014, Live@Love in which he stars in his first leading role in a theatrical film, co-stars Cheryl Yang whom he previous worked with in 2012 GTV television drama Once Upon a Love playing an older version of her son. The film is a mystery detective comedy with Liu playing Yang's young assistant. Then in November 2014, Second Chance has him in a supporting role starring opposite Taiwanese band Mayday's leader and guitarist Monster. The movie is about a young girl played by Huang Peijia, who enters a billiards competition in order to pay off her family debt. Liu plays the love interest of Huang Peijia's character.

==== 2015: Ghostly role and When I See You Again ====
The day after Pleasantly Surprised wrapped up filming, Liu attended a press conference on October 14, 2014, for his new drama I Am Sorry, I Love You that is being developed and produced by Chinese web streaming company Tudou. The drama has been described as a light-hearted fantasy romance comedy. Liu will play a ghost who continues to haunt his college ex-girlfriend played by Andrea Chen, and possibly help her move on and find a new romance played by Bryant Chang. Filming was scheduled to begin in November 2014. The drama aired in early 2015. After wrapping up filming of My Ghost Friend in March, Liu took a few months off before starting his next project. In early May 2015 he collaborated with Sanlih for a second time starring in their Sunday night drama When I See You Again opposite Mandy Wei. He played an unattractive guy during his school days who later becomes handsome.

==== 2016: First Fanmeeting and Take Me to The Moon ====
Following a successful Live Tour across Taiwan with his band, Morning Call in the year-end of 2015, the first half of 2016 was a quiet period for Liu. His supposedly first period Chinese Wuxia drama 王道劍 was constantly delayed even though it was slated to start filming early 2016. Bounded by his contracts and to avoid possible conflicting schedules, he could not take up other film works during this period of time. In between, he only took shorter projects such as filming endorsement CF works and dubbing for his first voice acting project for "Chibi Maruko-chan: Italia Kara Kita Shōnen" as the male lead, Andrea. Despite going through a relatively quiet period, his positive image and rising popularity is still prominent in Taiwan as he lands on several endorsements like Visa Taiwan Debit Card and appointed as the ambassador for various charity events.

After months of hiatus from filming, he finally took on the role of a hot-tempered and talented Indie band vocalist, "Rex" in web-series "Lost? Me Too: Chloe", starring along with actor Chris Wu and actress Nana Lee. The series revolves around the love and life of titular lead, "Chloe", a career-women played by Lee. Liu plays the love interest and new boyfriend of "Chloe" in the series. This role was a new challenge for Liu as the role requires him to sing, he was known to be the guitarist in his band, Morning Call and have never officially sing a full song on screen. The role "Rex" is very hot-tempered and brash, vastly different from the warmer roles he took in the past.

Collaborating with Korea's travel website, Nadoyo, his career took off to another level by holding his first ever Fanmeeting in Seoul, South Korea on July 31. According to news reports, 500 tickets were sold out in 10 minutes and hundreds of Korean fans greeted him in the airport, proving his popularity in South Korea. He was awarded with Asian Male Star Prize at 11th Seoul Drama Awards in September.

In September, Liu began filming the nostalgia high school musical romance, Take Me to the Moon, playing a high school student, opposite Vivian Sung. The film was inspired by the song of the same name by late popular Taiwanese singer-songwriter Chang Yu Sheng. Set in 1997 Taiwan, the film revolves around a group of high school schoolmates who formed The Moon Band and the last few nights before their graduation day. It was released on December 1, 2017, in Taiwan.

==== 2017–2018: Rising Popularity ====
In March 2017, Liu began filming his first work in China, Mary Sue & Jack Sue, a romantic comedy web series. He plays the heroine's warm childhood friend Su Zhi Huan and a secretly well-known comic artist.

After the wrap of his previous work, he stars as the protagonist, Lin Qing Wen in the historical-period Chinese TV drama that is set in Taiwan during the Japanese colonial era, My Bittersweet Taiwan (台湾往事), playing as the son of Zuo Xiao Qing.

Having collaborated earlier for Samsung Galaxy A8 series endorsement in Taiwan for year 2018, Ivy Chen and Liu are once again reunited as a couple in Taiwanese romantic melodrama film, More than Blue, a remake of the 2009 South Korean romance film of the same name. Liu plays the gloomy protagonist Chang Che-kai, who battles with terminal illness. Liu had to grow stubble and wear a long haired wig for this role, a different look from his usual clean styling. Filming for the movie wrapped up in mid-February and would be released on November 30, 2018.

A few days after the completion of his movie, Liu enters a new role, playing as a well-established music producer that's on a decline, Yan Dong Ming in Taiwanese romantic idol drama My Goddess. In the series, he pairs up with Annie Chen and once again, co-stars with Nana Lee. The series is a production of IQiyi Taiwan, the Taiwanese version of China streaming video giant and the series is slated for broadcast on November 16, 2018.

In mid-2018, the box office success of Liu's film Take Me to the Moon in Korea contributed to his rising popularity in Korea. Liu had been relatively known in Korea ever since his social media pictures circulated on Korean web in 2013 and appeared as a top ranking post on Korean portal site. During his Korean promotional period for film Take Me to the Moon, he topped Korean Naver real-time search ranking. He appeared on Korean TV Show The Return of Superman as a guest to Ko Ji-yong's family in episodes 229 and 232. Being the Asian Star Award winner in 2016, Liu returned as an award presenter in 2018 Seoul International Drama Awards.

In late 2018, his film More than Blue received warm response in 23rd Busan International Film Festival, 5000 tickets of world premiere in open cinema category was sold out within 5 minutes and he was awarded the "Face of Asia" prize by the film festival.

==== 2019–Present: More Than Blue, Before We Get Married and Independent Label ====
By the year 2019, More than Blue had grossed US$123,070,854 worldwide, it is the highest grossing domestic film in Taiwan in 2018. In China, where it released on 14 March 2019, grossed US$113.02 million, topping the daily box office charts for weeks and becoming the highest grossing Taiwanese film in China. It also grossed decent figures in several countries.

Liu reunited with Pleasantly Surprised co-star Puff Kuo for drama Before We Get Married which is adapted from a novel of same title. After its release on 31 May 2019, it generated huge online buzz across Mainland China and in Taiwan for its controversial and unconventional plot where both leads fall in love with each other despite having significant others. It performed well on online streaming sites, gaining over 400 million views and sold broadcasting license in over 90 regions across the globe. Liu's performance in the drama was widely praised as it shows a different image from his past positive and bright characters. The role Chu Kehuan brought him much more fame and popularity in China and across other countries.

In June 2019, it was announced that Liu had left his 10 years agency Eelin Entertainment after contract expiration and would be under his own independent label, collaborating with Eddie Peng's manager to manage his career. He also collaborates with the team behind Angelababy, Liu Haoran and Lin Chi-ling to manage his career in China market.

Lee Seung Gi and Liu partners up for Netflix's original Korean travel variety program Twogether, produced by the team behind popular Korean programs Running Man and Busted, the two would travel to different countries to visit their fans.

The same year, he co-starred with actress Eugenie Liu in the Netflix second Mandarin original series Triad Princess, which was released in December 2019. In late October 2019, filming for Chinese Republican fantasy drama Twelve Legends began, in which he plays the male lead, Jin Xing Jian, originally an ordinary rock who displays characteristics of a deity as well as a demon.

In late May 2020, filming for romance-comedy Use For My Talent with Shen Yue. He plays the male lead Gu Ren Qi, a man who grew up in an incomplete family with germophobia.

=== Music ===
When not modeling or acting, Liu is the guitarist for popular Taiwanese indie band Morning Call, signed to and managed by Eelin Entertainment. Formed in 2011, the group writes and produces their own songs. After performing in underground live houses for several years, they finally made their official debut in 2015 by releasing digital singles. The group often tours in small music venues around Asia. In December 2016, It was announced on the band's Facebook that they would be on indefinite hiatus after the departure of keyboardist Xiao Ying. The following year, bassist Meng Shu also left the band. Followed by Liu's departure from Eelin Entertainment in 2019, the group has naturally disbanded.

In October 2018, Liu was featured as a rapper in Summer Meng's single Happy Offshore Island (幸福離島).

Liu released the full version of A Kind of Sorrow, the theme song of film More Than Blue as a digital single on his birthday, August 12, 2019, under Pourquoi Pas Music record label, marking his debut as a solo singer.

== Image ==
Liu has been referred as "Village Chief of Broccoli Village" by fans because his curly hair resembles the top of a broccoli head. With his sunshine smile and dimples he is often dubbed as "Taiwan's Most Adorable Boyfriend", because of his popularity and warm image, he is also dubbed as "Taiwan's Nation Boyfriend" by the media.

== Personal life ==
Liu lives with his parents in his childhood home in Taipei. He enjoys traveling and going on vacations with his parents during his time off.

Besides writing songs, Liu is also known to be interested in oil painting. His dog "Yellow" is a favorite subject of his paintings. Liu has also donated some of his paintings to charity.

Liu has two brown furred Canaan dogs, named "Yellow" and "Yeahbe", that he often shared pictures on his social media. In 2018, Liu's 13 year old dog "Yellow" died due to complications from bacterial infections.

== Filmography ==
=== Television series ===
| Year | English title | Original title | Role | Network | Notes | Ref. |
|---|---|---|---|---|---|---|
| 2009 | Magic 18 | 魔女18號 | | CTS | Cameo | |
| 2011 | In Time with You | 我可能不會愛你 | Mei Nan | GTV | | |
| 2012 | Once Upon a Love | 原來愛·就是甜蜜 | Tian Yixiang | GTV | Cameo | |
| 2012 | Confucius | 智勝鮮師 | Zheng Yuanbing | CTV | | |
| 2013 | Amour et Patisserie | 沒有名字的甜點店 | Allen | PTS | | |
| 2013 | IUUI | 我愛你愛你愛我 | Luo Jiahe | PTS | | |
| 2014 | Kindaichi Case Files | 金田一少年之事件簿 獄門塾殺人事件 | Chen | NTV | | |
| 2014 | Pleasantly Surprised | 喜歡·一個人 | Louis Fu Zijie | SETTV | | |
| 2015 | I Am Sorry, I Love You | 我的鬼基友 | Ling Hongpei | Tudou | | |
| 2015 | When I See You Again | 他看她的第2眼 | Xia Youqian | SETTV | | |
| 2016 | Lost? Me Too: Chloe | 迷徒CHLOE | Rex | LINETV | | |
| 2017 | Mary Sue & Jack Sue | 瑪麗蘇遇上傑克蘇 | Su Zhihuan | Iqiyi | | |
| 2018 | My Bittersweet Taiwan | 台灣往事 | Lin Qingwen | Zhejiang TV | | |
| 2018 | My Goddess | 種菜女神 | Yan Dong-ming | Iqiyi Taiwan, TTV, EBC | | |
| 2019 | Before We Get Married | 我們不能是朋友 | Chu Ke-huan | GTV, TTV | | |
| 2019 | Triad Princess | 極道千金 | Xu Yi-hang | Netflix | | |
| 2020 | Twelve Legends | 十二谭 | Jin Xingjian | Youku | | |
| 2021 | Use For My Talent | 我亲爱的小洁癖 | Gu Renqi | Mango TV | | |
| 2021 | Fall in Love with a Scientist | 當愛情遇上科學家 | Yang Lanhang | Iqiyi | | |
| 2023 | Viva Femina | 耀眼的你啊 | Nie Yunze | Iqiyi | | |
| 2025 | I Am Married...But! | 童話故事下集 | Zeng Xue-you | Netflix | | |
| 2025 | Oops! I'm in Jail | 監所男子囚生記 | Jiang Yi-jie | iQiyi | | |
| 2026 | In His Hands | 神之手 | Situ Feng | meWATCH | | |

=== Feature film ===
| Year | English title | Original title | Role | Notes | Ref. |
|---|---|---|---|---|---|
| 2013 | Sex AGoGo | 72小時莎到你 | Li Kai-jie | Unreleased | |
| 2014 | Live@Love | 活路：妒忌私家偵探社 | Yan Su-jun | | |
| 2014 | Second Chance | 逆轉勝 | Hei Lun | | |
| 2016 | Chibi Maruko-chan: Italia Kara Kita Shōnen | 櫻桃小丸子電影版：來自意大利的少年 | Andrea | Voice | |
| 2017 | Take Me to the Moon | 帶我去月球 | Wang Cheng-hsiang | | |
| 2018 | More than Blue | 比悲傷更悲傷的故事 | Chang Che-kai (K) | | |
| 2022 | Don't Forget I Love You | 不要忘記我愛你 | Lu Yao | | |
| 2023 | Puppy Love | 愛犬奇緣 | Cheng Feng | | |
| 2024 | As It Burns | 白晝如焚 | Lu Zi-feng | | |
| 2025 | A Gilded Game | 獵金·遊戲 | Chu Feng | | |
| 2026 | Oh My Ghost! Oh My God! | 怎麼可能我家的祖先是你家的鬼 | Xiao Luo | | |

=== Short film ===
| Year | English title | Original title | Role |
|---|---|---|---|
| 2010 | Visual Communication Design Da Yeh University | 大葉大學視覺傳達設計系 | Male swimmer |
| 2011 | Radio and Television Dept. of Shih Hsin; University 17th Annual Exhibition Movie | 世新大學廣電系第17屆畢展短片–環島旅行 | Young man |
| 2011 | Laurel:Love | 桂冠愛 | Love temperature |
| 2012 | Eelin Milk Tablets | 伊利牛奶片 | Silent man |
| 2012 | Hsinchu Bride Wedding Story | 新竹新娘物語婚紗 | Uncredited |
| 2014 | Master Classic Tea | 康師傅經典奶茶 | Umbrella guy |
| 2017 | Timeless Kotohira Taiwan Version | —N/a | Shun-hou |

=== Variety and reality show ===
| Year | Network | English title | Role |
|---|---|---|---|
| 2018 | KBS2 | The Return Of Superman | Guest |
| 2020 | Netflix | Twogether | Cast member |
| 2020 | Tencent | When We Write Love Story | Cast member |

=== Music video appearances ===
| Year | Song title | Details | Link |
|---|---|---|---|
| 2009 | I Do Not Know (我不了解) | Singer(s): Zhang Jing 張婧; Album: Leave Together (一直走) | Video on YouTube |
| 2010 | Everything | Singer(s): Lara Veronin 梁心頤; Album: Hello Lara (Hello 梁心頤) | Video on YouTube |
| 2011 | Letting Go | Singer(s): Tanya Chua 蔡健雅; Album: Speaking Of Love (說到愛) | Video on YouTube |
| 2011 | Silent Night (平安夜) | Singer(s): Lea Lin 林依婷; Album: Like A Child (像孩子一样) | Video on YouTube |
| 2012 | Good Person (好人好者) | Singer(s): Abella Leung 梁佑嘉; Album: Abella 3 | Video on YouTube |
| 2012 | Valentine's Day | Singer(s): A-do 阿杜; Album: 9th Love (第9次初戀) | Video on YouTube |
| 2013 | Chocolate (朱古力) | Singer(s): VOX; Album: Chocolate (朱古力) | Video on YouTube |
| 2013 | Break Up To Show I Love You (分手說愛你) | Singer(s): Kimberley Chen 陳芳語; Album: Kimbonomics (Kimbonomics金式代) | Video on YouTube |
| 2014 | Dot Of Water (點水) | Singer(s): Rainie Yang 楊丞琳; Album: A Tale of Two Rainie (雙丞戲) | Video on YouTube |
| 2016 | I Really Like You (好喜歡你) | Singer(s): Lulu 黃路梓茵; Album: Lulu,腿 | Video on YouTube |
| 2016 | Always (一直) | Singer(s): Gui Gui 鬼鬼 吳映潔; Album: GEMMA | Video on YouTube |
| 2018 | Happy Offshore Island (幸福離島) | Singer(s): Summer Meng 孟耿如 Feat. Jasper Liu 劉以豪; Album: 我不可愛 | Video on YouTube |
| 2019 | A Kind of Sorrow (有一種悲傷) | Singer(s): Jasper Liu 劉以豪 | Video on YouTube |

== Publications ==
* 17 July 2015 : Dogs And Cats Persons Jasper Liu Kyoto (犬貓人 劉以豪 晃京都) – ISBN 9789863424239 – Author: Jasper Liu 劉以豪 – Publisher: Suncolor 三采文化 (TW)

A 192 page paperback photo book shoot during Liu's travels to Kyoto, Japan.

* 30 November 2016 : Morning Call's Six Years and Three Nights (輕晨電的六年三夜) – ISBN 9789869323987 – Author: Morning Call 輕晨電 – Publisher: KATE Publishing 凱特文化 (TW)

A 192 page paperback photo book shoot with Liu's band, Morning Call on a 3 nights camping trip. The book also includes handwritten letters and written record of the conversations between band members about the times they were together for six years.

== Discography ==
=== Singles ===
| Year | Song title | Details |
|---|---|---|
| 2018 | "Happy Offshore Island" (幸福離島) | Singer(s): Summer Meng feat. Jasper Liu |
| 2019 | "A Kind of Sorrow" (有一種悲傷) | |

=== Extended plays ===
| Title | Album details | Track listing |
|---|---|---|
| U | Released: 4 September 2020; Label: Pourquoi Pas Music; Formats: CD, digital download | Track listing: 1. U 2. Your Favorite Song (半空); 3. Stay with You (走吧走吧); 4. A Kind of Sorrow (有一種悲傷) |

== Awards and nominations ==
| Year | Award | Category | Nominated work | Result |
|---|---|---|---|---|
| 2008 | Eelin Model Search | Male Model – 3rd place | —N/a | Won |
| 2013 | Bella Awards | Warm Superstar Potential Award | —N/a | Won |
| 2014 | Yahoo Kimo Beauty Awards | Male – 2nd place | —N/a | Won |
| 2014 | Sanlih Drama Awards | Best Screen Couple Award (with Puff Kuo) | Pleasantly Surprised | Nominated |
| 2014 | Sanlih Drama Awards | Best Crying Award (with Puff Kuo) | Pleasantly Surprised | Nominated |
| 2014 | Sanlih Drama Awards | Best Kiss Award (with Puff Kuo) | Pleasantly Surprised | Won |
| 2014 | Sanlih Drama Awards | Best Actor Award | Pleasantly Surprised | Nominated |
| 2014 | Sanlih Drama Awards | China Wave Award | Pleasantly Surprised | Nominated |
| 2014 | Sanlih Drama Awards | Weibo Popularity Award | Pleasantly Surprised | Nominated |
| 2016 | Seoul International Drama Awards | Asia Star Award | —N/a | Won |
| 2018 | Busan International Film Festival | Face of Asia Award | —N/a | Won |
| 2018 | Asia Artist Awards | AAA Choice Award | —N/a | Won |
| 2018 | Starhub Night of Stars | Dazzling Star Award | —N/a | Won |
