= The Victims' Game =

Taiwanese television series

- Traditional Chinese: 誰是被害者
- Simplified Chinese: 谁是被害者
- Hanyu Pinyin: Shuí Shì Bèihàizhě
- Genre: Drama; Thriller
- Created by: Chien Shih-keng
- Based on: The Fourth Victim by INFINITY
- Developed by: Monomyth Co., Ltd.
- Written by: Liang Shu-ting; Hsu Ruei-liang
- Directed by: David Chuang; Chen Kuan-chung
- Starring: Joseph Chang; Wei-ning Hsu; Shih-hsien Wang
- Theme music composer: MUSDM
- Ending theme: "One Who Will (Find Me)" by Karencici (season 1) "The Beloved" by Dean Fujioka (season 2)
- Country of origin: Taiwan
- Original language: Mandarin
- No. of seasons: 2
- No. of episodes: 16

Production
- Executive producer: Tseng Han-hsien
- Producers: Phil Tang; Hsu Kuo-lun; Hsu Wen-hsiung
- Editors: Shieh Meng-ju; Chiang Yi-ning
- Running time: 62-67 minutes
- Production companies: Third Man Entertainment Co., Ltd.; Greener Grass Production Co., Ltd.; Taiwan Mobile Co., Ltd.

Original release
- Network: Netflix
- Release: 30 April 2020 – present

The Victims' Game is a Taiwanese television series on Netflix starring Joseph Chang, Ann Hsu and Jason Wang. The plot revolves around the forensic scientist with Asperger syndrome Fang Yi-jen (Joseph Chang) and the investigative journalist Hsu Hai-yin (Ann Hsu), investigating a case involving Fang Yi-jen's daughter. Season 2 was announced in September 2020 and premiered on June 21, 2024.

== Cast ==
- Joseph Chang as Fang Yi-Jen
  - Peter Tseng as Fang Yi-Jen (age 18)
- Hsu Wei-ning as Hsu Hai-Yin
- Shih-hsien Wang as Chao Cheng-Kuan
- Ruby Lin as Li Ya-Jun (season 1)
- River Huang as Yu Cheng-Hao (season 1)
- Moon Lee as Chiang Hsiao-Meng, Fang Yi-Jen's daughter
  - Nini Weng as Chiang Hsiao-Meng (age 7) (season 1)
- Ning Ding as Su Ko-Yun (season 1)
- Chia-Kuei Chen as Chang Tsung-Chien (season 1)
- Rexen Cheng as Chuang Ping-Yao (season 1)
- Joseph Hsia as Liu Kuang-Yung (season 1)
  - Chia-En Yang as Liu Kuang-Yung (age 17) (season 1)
- Zhang-xing Chang as Liao
- Sheng-te Hong as Sun Yung-Chen
- Hao-zhe Lai as Fatso (season 1)
- Bruce Chen as Ta-Tse (season 1)
- Diane Lin as Chou Yu-hsuan (season 1)
- Ma Nien-hsien as Chen Yao-Hui (season 1)
- Chin Chi as Lin Yu-Jung, Kuang-Yung's wife (season 1)
- Han Chang as forensic science teacher (season 1)
- Yiin-shang Liu as Tsou Yueh-Huan, Ko-Yun's mother (season 1)
- Grace Ko as Legislator Chien Shu-Fei (season 1)
- Chiung-tzu Chang as Chen Li-Chi (season 1)
- Helen Hsu as Chiang Jo-ying, Yi-Jen's wife (season 1)
- Chiung-hsuan Hsieh as Wu Fang-Ning, Cheng-Kuan's wife (season 1)
- Tsai-Yi Huang as Chang Hsin (season 1)
- Jau-der Yin as Chou Yang (season 1)
- Tarcy Su as Hsueh Hsin-Ning (season 2)
- Dean Fujioka as Chang Keng-Hao (season 2)
- Buffy Chen as Hsiao Chia-Ying (season 2)
- Terrance Lau as Lin Ming-Cheng (season 2)
  - Troy Liu as Lin Ming-Cheng (Young) (season 2)
- Devin Pan as Wu Chun-Lu (season 2)
- Jieh-Wen King as Lin Ching-Jui (season 2)
- Yu-Chien Liu as Chen Yang-Yu (season 2)
- An-Shun Yu as Lu Shih-Hsien (season 2)
- Steven Chiang as Yamamoto (season 2)
- Cecilia Choi as Liu Shu-Yen (season 2)
  - Yun-Jen Chu as Liu Shu-Yen (Young) (season 2)
- Ivy Yin as Hsiao Min-Chun (season 2)
- Karencici as Yuan Chi-Ling (season 2)
  - Yen-Tzu Lin as Yuan Chi-Ling (Young) (season 2)
- Chih-Wei Cheng as Liu Shu-Yen's Father (season 2)
- BeBe Du as Kuo Hsin-Pai (season 2)
  - Jia-Tong Tsai as Kuo Hsin-Pai (Young) (season 2)
- Ya-Hui Chen as Yuan's Mother (season 2)

== Release ==
The Victims' Game was released on April 30, 2020 on Netflix. It is Netflix's fourth original Mandarin-language series after Nowhere Man, Triad Princess, and The Ghost Bride.

== Soundtrack ==
The Victims' Game Original Soundtrack (OST)

Soundtrack album by Various artists
- Released: 1 May 2020
- Genre: Mandopop
- Language: Mandarin
- Label: HIM International Music Inc.

The Victims' Game Original Soundtrack (OST) (誰是被害者-影集原聲帶) was released on May 1, 2020 by various artists. It contains a total of 4 tracks. The OST album is available for streaming on various music streaming platforms including but not limited to Spotify, Apple Music and YouTube Music.

=== Track listing ===
No.	Title	Singer(s)	Length
1.	"Listen To Me" (我要你)	Yo Lee	4:05
2.	"One Who Will (Find Me)" (誰)	Karencici	4:07
3.	"White Horse"	Shao Hao 邵豪	4:13
4.	"No Regrets" (不存在的遺憾)	Nauledge Huang 黃祝賢儒	4:10

Everyone Is A Ghost Single

Soundtrack album by Ann Hsu
- Released: 30 April 2020
- Genre: Mandopop
- Language: Mandarin
- Label: Music Bravo Co., LTD

Everyone Is A Ghost - Single (每個人都是鬼 《誰是被害者》Netflix 原創影集 宣傳曲) was released on April 30, 2020 by Ann Hsu. It contains a total of 2 tracks. The single is available for streaming on various music streaming platforms including but not limited to Spotify, Apple Music and YouTube Music.

=== Track listing ===
No.	Title	Singer(s)	Length
1.	"Everyone Is A Ghost" (每個人都是鬼 -《誰是被害者》宣傳曲)	Ann Hsu	3:41
2.	"Everyone Is A Ghost (Off Vocal)" (每個人都是鬼 (伴奏) -《誰是被害者》宣傳曲)	Ann Hsu	3:41

Still Alive Single

Soundtrack album by Salsa Chen
- Released: 1 May 2020
- Genre: Mandopop
- Language: Mandarin
- Label: HIM International Music Inc.

Still Alive - Single (還活著 - Netflix原創影集《誰是被害者》插曲) was released on May 1, 2020 by Salsa Chen. It contains a total of 1 track. The single is available for streaming on various music streaming platforms including but not limited to Spotify, Apple Music and YouTube Music.

=== Track listing ===
No.	Title	Singer(s)	Length
1.	"Still Alive" (還活著 -《誰是被害者》插曲)	Salsa Chen	4:06

== Awards and nominations ==
Year	Ceremony	Category	Nominee	Result
2020	55th Golden Bell Awards	Best Television Series	The Victims' Game	Nominated
2020	55th Golden Bell Awards	Best Leading Actor in a Television Series	Joseph Chang	Nominated
2020	55th Golden Bell Awards	Best Newcomer in a Television Series	Moon Lee	Won
2020	55th Golden Bell Awards	Best Director in a Television Series	David Chuang, Allen Chen	Nominated
2020	55th Golden Bell Awards	Best Writing for a Television Series	Liang Shu-Ting, Xu Rui	Nominated
2020	55th Golden Bell Awards	Best Cinematography	Liu Zhi-Huan	Nominated
2020	55th Golden Bell Awards	Best Film Editing	Jie Meng-Ru, Jiang Yi-Ning	Nominated
2020	55th Golden Bell Awards	Best Art and Design Award	Yuan Shu (Liao Jian-An), Shi Xiao-Rou, Chu Xu (Chu Jia-Yi), Guo Xian-Cong	Nominated
2020	2nd Asia Contents Awards	Best Creative	The Victims' Game	Nominated
2020	2nd Asia Contents Awards	Best Actor	Joseph Chang	Won
2020	2nd Asia Contents Awards	Best Writer	Liang Shu-Ting, Hsu Ruei-Liang	Nominated
2020	2nd Asia Contents Awards	Newcomer Actress	Moon Lee	Nominated
2020	2nd Asia Contents Awards	Technical Achievement Award	Cinematography	Nominated
2020	Asian Academy Creative Awards 2020	Best Drama Series	The Victims' Game	Nominated
2020	Asian Academy Creative Awards 2020	Best Direction (Fiction)	David Chuang, Kuan-Chung Chen	Nominated
2020	Asian Academy Creative Awards 2020	Best Actress in a Supporting Role	Moon Lee	Nominated
2020	Asian Academy Creative Awards 2020	Best Cinematography	Stanley Liu	Nominated
2020	Asian Academy Creative Awards 2020	Best Editing	Meng-Ju Shieh, Yi-Ning Chiang	Nominated
