= More than Blue (2018 film) =

- Theatrical release poster
- Traditional Chinese: 比悲傷更悲傷的故事
- Simplified Chinese: 比悲伤更悲伤的故事
- Literal meaning: A Story Sadder Than Sadness
- Hanyu Pinyin: bǐ bēi shāng gèng bēi shāng de gù shì
- Directed by: Gavin Lin
- Written by: Hermes Lu; Gavin Lin
- Produced by: Cora Yim; Rita Chuang; Say Yong Ng
- Starring: Jasper Liu; Ivy Chen
- Cinematography: Kwan Pun Leung
- Edited by: Chiang Yi-ning
- Music by: Chen Chien-Chi; Annie Lo
- Production company: mm2 Entertainment
- Distributed by: ifilm 20th Century Fox (Hong Kong)
- Release dates: October 7, 2018 (Busan); November 30, 2018 (Taiwan & Hongkong); December 12, 2018 (Korea); December 13, 2018 (Singapore); December 27, 2018 (Malaysia)
- Running time: 105 minutes
- Country: Taiwan
- Language: Mandarin
- Box office: US$153 million

More than Blue (Chinese: 比悲傷更悲傷的故事) is a 2018 Taiwanese romance drama film directed by Gavin Lin. It is a remake of the 2009 South Korean film of the same name. The film stars Taiwanese actors like Jasper Liu and Ivy Chen. On November 30, 2018, it was released

== Synopsis ==
The film entails the story of a terminally ill man who sets up his best friend, whom he had loved since high school, so that she won't be alone after his death.

Cream, who has a bright personality with a dark streak, somehow manages to bond with K, who is a generally secretive person. As high school classmates, they share their feelings, becomes close to one another, and fills the pit in their stomach. Cream moves into K's place and live like a family. Years go by, K works for a record company and Cream becomes a lyricist, but they still live together, neither a couple nor friends. Diagnosed with leukemia, K resents to reveal his diagnosis as he does not want to hurt Cream by leaving her alone. Not knowing any of this, Cream starts dating another man and as time went by, she accepted his marriage proposal.

== Cast ==
- Jasper Liu as Chang Che-kai (K)
- Ivy Chen as Song Yuan-yuan (Cream)
- Bryan Chang as Yang You-hsien
- Annie Chen as Cindy

=== Special appearance ===
- Pipi Yao as Young Song Yuan-yuan (Cream)
- Chih Tian-hsih as Young Chang Che-kai (K)
- Emma Wu as Bonnie
- Da Qing as Ji Ge
- Bruce Hung as Ah Bang
- A-Lin as herself
- Heaven Hai as Maggie

== Production ==
Filming began in January 2018.

== Reception ==
=== Busan Film Festival ===
The film received a warm response at its world premiere at the 23rd Busan International Film Festival open cinema category where tickets sold out within 5 minutes. Main cast Jasper Liu and Ivy Chen were awarded the "Face of Asia" prize by the film festival.

=== Box office ===
Domestically, the film made NT$32 million on the first 3 days, breaking the box office record of highest opening Taiwanese film in 2018. The film eclipsed the NT$100 million mark within 9 days of release, breaking the box office speed record of hit Taiwanese film, Our Times which grossed NT$100 million in 10 days in 2015. By the 11th day of release, the film made NT$135 million, attracting an audience of 580,000 admissions, becoming the highest-grossing Taiwanese film of 2018. As of 17 February 2019, the film has grossed NT$239,577,835 (US$8,577,182) in Taiwan.

In Hong Kong, it grossed HK$1.7 million by the first 3 days of opening, becoming the highest opening Taiwanese film in Hong Kong in recent 3 years. By 11 December 2018, the film had made HK$8 million, staying in the top 5 box office rankings for a consecutive number of days. As of 30 December 2018, the film has grossed HK$17.12 million (US$2,203,346) in Hong Kong.

In China, where it released on 14 March 2019, the film surpassed Captain Marvel at the box office, grossing CN¥330 million (US$49.2 million) in its opening week. Female audiences accounted for 65% of the tickets sold in its opening week. As of 23 March 2019, More than Blue has grossed US$113.02 million in China.

The film has also grossed US$709,965 in the United States and Canada, US$194,100 in South Korea, and US$240,384 in Australia, bringing its worldwide gross to US$123,070,854.

== Sequel ==
In 2021, the movie received a television adaptation, More than Blue: The Series. It premiered on October 22, 2021 on Netflix
