= Lingo Hsieh =

Taiwanese director and screenwriter

- 謝庭菡
- Born: 13 June 1985 (age 40); Taipei, Taiwan
- Other name: Hsieh Ting-Han
- Occupations: Film director; Screenwriter

Chinese name
- Traditional Chinese: 謝庭菡
- Simplified Chinese: 谢庭菡
Transcriptions
Standard Mandarin
- Hanyu Pinyin: Xiè Tínghàn
- Wade–Giles: Hsieh Ting-Han
Yue: Cantonese
- Jyutping: Ze6 Ting4-Haam5
Southern Min
- Hokkien POJ: Siā Têng-hiân

Lingo Hsieh (Chinese: 謝庭菡; pinyin: Xiè Tínghàn; born 13 June 1985) is a Taiwanese director and screenwriter. She is known for directing the horror film The Bride, as well as the TV series Green Door, starring Jam Hsiao.

== Career ==
Hsieh directed her first short film in 2013 titled Doppelganger. In 2014, she directed a short film, The Bride, when still a graduate student at National Taiwan University of Arts. For the film, Hsieh collaborated with Takashige Ichise, director of the Ring, to explore the tradition of ghost marriage. She collaborated with Ichise again to develop the film for a feature-length version released in 2015, also called The Bride, starring Wu Kang-ren and Chie Tanaka. Although not as successful as The Tag-Along released the same year, the film gained financial and critical success in Taiwan.

In 2019, Hsieh adapted Joseph Chen's novel Green Door for a six-episode television series, which she also directed. Green Door aired on Public Television Service before Netflix acquired the streaming rights.

== Filmography ==
=== Film ===
| Year | Title | Original title | Director | Writer | Notes |
|---|---|---|---|---|---|
| 2013 | Doppelganger | 殮財 | Yes | Yes | Short film, cinematographer Ko-Chin Chen won an award at the 34th Golden Harvest Awards |
| 2014 | The Bride | 屍憶 | Yes | Yes | Short film |
| 2014 | The Evil Inside | 噬心魔 | Yes | Yes | Short film, special mention at the 37th Golden Harvest Awards |
| 2015 | The Bride | 屍憶 | Yes | Yes | Feature film, produced by Takashige Ichise, nominated for Best Narrative Feature at the 18th Taipei Film Festival |

=== Television ===
| Year | Title | Original title | Director | Writer | Notes |
|---|---|---|---|---|---|
| 2019 | Green Door | 魂囚西門 | Yes | Yes | Mini-series starring Jam Hsiao, Bea Hayden and Enno Cheng |

== Awards and nominations ==
| Year | Award | Category | Nominated work | Result |
|---|---|---|---|---|
| 2014 | 37th Golden Harvest Awards for Outstanding Short Films | Best Fiction Short | Doppelganger | Nominated |
| 2015 | 38th Golden Harvest Awards for Outstanding Short Films | Special Mention | The Evil Inside | Won |
| 2016 | 18th Taipei Film Festival | Best Narrative Feature | The Bride | Nominated |
