= Mudborn =

2025 Taiwanese film by Shieh Meng-ju

- Film poster
- 泥娃娃
- Directed by: Shieh Meng-ju
- Written by: Huang Yen-chiao
- Starring: Tony Yang; Cecilia Choi; Derek Chang; Puff Kuo; Tracy Chou
- Cinematography: Chen Chi-wen
- Music by: Ding Dang
- Production companies: WOWing Entertainment Group; Flash Forward Entertainment; Gift Pictures
- Distributed by: Machi Xcelsior Studios Co., Ltd
- Release date: 9 October 2025 (Taiwan)
- Running time: 110 minutes
- Country: Taiwan
- Language: Taiwanese Mandarin
- Budget: NT$40 million
- Box office: NT$100 million (Taiwan)

Mudborn (Chinese: 泥娃娃; Tongyong Pinyin: Níwáwa; Tâi-lô: nî ang-á) is a 2025 Taiwanese supernatural horror film directed by Shieh Meng-ju. The film stars Tony Yang, Cecilia Choi, Derek Chang, Puff Kuo, and Tracy Chou. It combines elements of Taiwanese folklore, psychological horror, and virtual reality themes, and is loosely inspired by the classic Taiwanese nursery rhyme "Mud Doll" (泥娃娃).

The film was released in Taiwan on 9 October 2025, Malaysia on 25 November 2025 and later in the Philippines on 18 March 2026. It achieved commercial success domestically, surpassing NT$100 million at the Taiwanese box office. It became Taiwan's third biggest domestic film of 2025.

== Plot ==
The movie begins with a man named Ah-Yi, along with another colleague scanning an abandoned house with a device. It is revealed through their conversation that they are here to scout the scene for a virtual reality game that is to be set in the same place. By scanning the scene in real time, they create a 360-degree view that can be referenced for the game. While walking around, they accidentally destroy the head of a clay doll shaped like a baby. They notice the doll has strange markings on its back and head. After this, they experience a series of paranormal activities that kills the colleague and sends Ah-Yi into a terrified state. His fate is unknown.

Meanwhile we see a game developer Hsu-Chuan working for the same company making a horror game. Ah-Yi is his colleague but has not been seen in days. The horror game was Ah-Yi's proposal but now Hsu-Chuan is forced to take up the development of the horror game and has to put his own proposal for a "Best Partner" game, a family friendly game on the backburner. While presenting a demo of the game to an investor, Ah-Yi runs into the office but behaves in a crazy manner, even vomiting up some substances. This incident surprisingly does not deter the investor, and he wants the project of the horror game to go on.

The movie reveals that in a house, a man killed his family with a knife for unknown reasons. The man's wife was Liu-Hsin, a woman who made intricate clay dolls. Despite the fact that all the members of the family were dead, Liu-Hsin's body was never found, leading it to be a mystery. Ah-yi had wished to make a virtual reality horror game on this set up, that allowed the player to wander in the family's derelict house to find clues regarding their murder. The house he was in at the beginning of the movie is the same house where these murders happened.

All the belongings retrieved from the house is entrusted to Hsu-Chuan as the new head of the project, and he unknowingly brings the broken clay doll home. Now, we get a glimpse at his family. His wife, Mu-Hua, is an artifact conserver and she is pregnant with their first child. They have a serene and loving life. Hsu-Chuan does not show the doll to Mu-Hua and forgets about it. However, at night, paranormal activities begin to happen. Mu-Hua senses the AC temperature changing on its own, and doors opening by themselves. She wanders out and curiously finds the broken clay doll. Suddenly she is struck still by a sight not revealed to the audience.

The next day morning, her behaviour has drastically changed. She eats raw meat, behaves in a cold and jerky manner, screams randomly and abruptly and has turned pale. When Hsu-Chuan leaves for work, she experiences hallucinations and soon is possessed to offer some of her blood to the broken clay doll. With a psychotic smile, a fully possessed Mu-Hua mixes her own blood in clay to repair the doll.

That night onwards, paranormal activities intensify. CCTV cameras and baby monitors capture figures moving where no one is, and Hsu-Chuan sees his wife turning irritable, short tempered, cold and unexpectedly attached to the clay doll. Her physical situation deteriorates and she even makes a move to scratch her pregnant stomach to leave deep scratches. Hsu-Chuan is perplexed and terrified.

Hsu-Chuan finds Ah-Yi but his behaviour is eccentric in the extreme. He seems terrified of entities that are not there, and his body begins contorting in a strange way when Hsu-Chuan attempts to speak to him. It is revealed that Mu-Hua has gained supernatural powers and has created a voodoo doll connected to Ah-Yi. Her violent movements at home with the doll manifest as physical injuries with Ah-Yi. This knowledge is revealed only to the audience. Ah-Yi dies in front of Hsu-Chuan who helplessly watches.

Realizing the severity of the situation, Hsu-Chuan urgently finds Ah-Sheng, a spiritual practitioner. Ah-Sheng wishes to gain more information on the situation, and they set out to meet Liu-Hsin's sister, Liu Yen. They believe Liu-Hsin may be behind the paranormal incidents at home and wish to find out more about her. Liu-Yen tells them that Liu Hsin was radical in her approach towards clay works. She frequently carved Taoist talismans on her work and even used soil from graveyards to make figurines. She believed soil held emotions, memories and souls and made an attempt to represent that in her work. Liu-Yen confesses that everything around her sister's death is an utter mystery.

Ah-Sheng and Hsu-Chuan, armed with this information, return home. Ah-Sheng attempts to weaken Mu-Hua by making her walk on salt and attempting to bind her with talismans. However, she is too powerful. He realizes the broken clay doll is the centre of paranormal activity and that the strange markings on its back is a powerful binding talisman. Since it is shattered, it can no longer hold the spirits. The appropriate thing would be to engrave the complete talisman on the doll again but there is no way of knowing what the talisman would be like.

Utterly in the dark, Ah-Sheng and Hsu-Chuan return to Liu-Yen and through powerful Taoist rituals, send her via rituals to see glimpses of the past, that is, to see the days leading up to Liu-Hsin's death and to gain more information about the doll's creation, and to see the complete talisman. Liu-Yen witnesses a pregnant Liu-Hsin digging the soil for a new project from near a grave. Suddenly, she experiences a miscarriage in which she loses her baby. In its aftermath, a grieving Liu Hsin changes her mind and decides to use the newly collected graveyard soil to make something for her deceased child. She blends her dead foetus, her endometrial blood and the graveyard soil to make the clay, then shapes it like a baby. This is the origin of the clay doll.

However, the doll has become a centre of death and supernatural energy. Multiple spirits inhabit the doll and all crave for blood. The doll possesses her often to take her blood and even makes her kill her family. It turns out that Liu-Hsin has killed her family all along. Struck by guilt, she carves a powerful binding talisman on the back of the doll's head and spine. Then, holding it, she bricks herself up in the kiln and turns it on. Her last wish was to contain the doll by trapping herself. This is why her body was never found. However, the doll is too powerful and has managed to make its way out of the kiln into the derelict house.

Ah-Sheng and Hsu-Chuan realize that too much time has passed since Mu-Hua has been fully possessed and that they must take immediate action. They cannot fully free her so they weaken her for the time being, rendering her unconscious and decide that going to the derelict house is the best option. Perhaps, Liu-Hsin has left something there that will help them defeat the ghosts in Mu-Hua. Ah-Sheng searches for Liu-Hsin's skull, believing that containing ghosts within the remnant of a human body is more effective than trapping them in a clay doll. As a backup plan, he has Hsu-Chuan use the online scanned files of the house to search for the pieces of the broken clay doll to complete the talisman. As the scan was 360 degrees, Hsu-Chuan believes that somewhere, the broken fragments of the talisman will be there which he can search within the game.

However, both plans fail. When Mu-Hua escapes, Ah-Sheng forcefully exorcises her but the ghosts within her are so powerful neither Liu-Hsin's skull nor the clay doll with the completed talisman can hold it. Ah-Sheng realizes that they wish to possess Mu-Hua and Hsu-Chuan's unborn child. He wants to trap the spirits inside their child, much to Mu-Hua and Hsu-Chuan's anger and denial. At the same time, they cannot let the spirits drain Mu-Hua of her blood and energy. Seeing no other way to protect his wife and child both, Hsu-Chuan willingly takes the ghosts into himself.

He struggles to hold the ghosts, and Ah-Sheng writes the talisman on Hsu-Chuan's back to contain the ghosts inside him. Finally, Hsu-Chuan collapses, seemingly dead. A while later, Mu-Hua has given birth. She cares for her baby girl and misses Hsu-Chuan. That is when a package arrives for her, containing Hsu-Chuan's personal project, the "Best Partner" proposal that he was forced to set aside for the horror VR game. The game has a perfect simulation of Hsu-Chuan and in the game, Mu-Hua can finally have some time with her husband as she tearfully embraces him. As the camera pulls away we can see she is wearing VR goggles.

Meanwhile, the post credits scene shows Hsu-Chuan, hooked up to an IV in Liu-Yen's house. It seems he is alive but in a coma after the events in the house. Meanwhile, the camera cuts to Ah-Sheng's office, showing details of a talisman for "Resurrection", setting up the possibility that Hsu-Chuan could be brought back one day and the consequences that would follow.

== Cast ==
- Tony Yang as Chang Hsu-Chuan, a VR game planner
- Cecilia Choi as Hsu Muhua, an artifact conservator
- Derek Chang as A-Sheng, a folklorist and exorcist
- Puff Kuo as Liu Yen, a gallery manager
- Tracy Chou as Liu Hsin, a ceramic artist

== Production ==
The film was directed by Shieh Meng-ju, a film editor known for his work on productions such as The Soul and the television series Copycat Killer. Mudborn marks his directorial work in the horror genre.

The screenplay was written by Huang Yen-chiao, who has worked on several Taiwanese horror and thriller films. The production team included cinematographer Chen Chi-wen and art director Chen Po-jen, both of whom have experience in genre films.

Special effects were supervised by Yen Chen-chin, while the musical score and sound design were created by members of the production team behind the Taiwanese horror film Incantation. The film integrates traditional horror elements with contemporary themes, including virtual reality and digital environments.

The production budget was reported to be approximately NT$40 million.

== Release ==
Mudborn premiered in Taiwan on 9 October 2025. It was subsequently released in Malaysia and Brunei on 27 November, Vietnam on 26 December, Cambodia on 16 January 2026, Singapore on 22 January, Indonesia on 30 January, Thailand on 5 February, Australia and New Zealand on 12 February, and the Philippines on 18 March 2026.

Marketing for international releases emphasized the film's central horror elements, including a broken clay doll, a recurring nursery rhyme, and a series of "rules" associated with avoiding supernatural danger, such as not repairing or treating the doll as a child.

== Box office ==
The film performed strongly at the Taiwanese box office, earning over NT$24 million in its opening period. By its 58th day of release, it had exceeded NT$100 million domestically.

In Malaysia, the film became the highest-grossing Mandarin film of 2025.

== Themes ==
Mudborn incorporates elements of East Asian folklore, particularly beliefs surrounding cursed objects and spirit attachment. The clay doll serves as the central motif, representing the intersection of innocence and latent threat. The film also explores themes of obsession, motherhood, and the consequences of disturbing objects associated with unresolved histories. The integration of virtual reality technology reflects contemporary anxieties about the merging of digital and physical experiences.

== Reception ==
The film was nominated for several awards at the 1st Taiwan Entertainment Film Awards in 2026, including nominations for "Annual Date Movie", "Most Anticipated Sequel", and acting nominations for Cecilia Choi and Derek Chang. It won a box office award.

== See also ==
- Cinema of Taiwan
- List of Taiwanese films
- Supernatural horror film
