= Cecilia Choi =

Hong Kong actress (born 1994)

- 蔡思韵
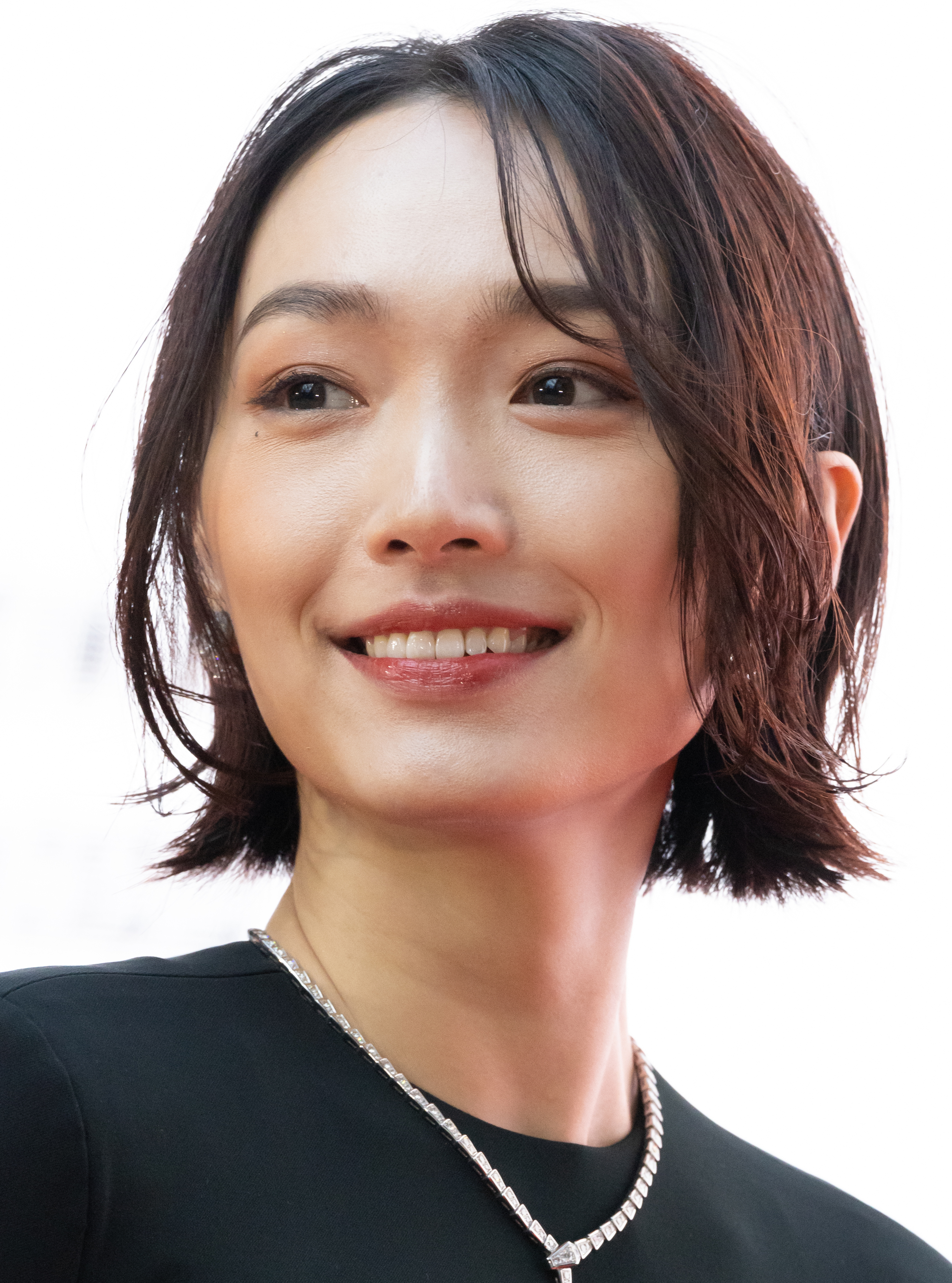
- Choi at the 35th Tokyo International Film Festival in 2022
- Born: Choi Sze-wan; July 23, 1994 (age 32); British Hong Kong
- Education: HKICC Lee Shau Kee School of Creativity; Taipei National University of the Arts
- Occupation: Actress
- Years active: 2014–present

Chinese name
- Chinese: 蔡思韵
Transcriptions
Standard Mandarin
- Hanyu Pinyin: Cài Sīyùn
Yue: Cantonese
- Yale Romanization: Choi Sī-wahn
- Jyutping: Coi3 Si1wan6

Cecilia Choi Sze-wan (Chinese: 蔡思韵; born 23 July 1994) is a Hong Kong actress. She is known for playing the key supporting role in Detention and the leading role in Beyond the Dream, for which she won for the Best Actress award at the 26th Hong Kong Film Critics Society Awards and was nominated for Best Actress at 39th Hong Kong Film Awards.

== Filmography ==
=== Film ===
Year	English title	Original title	Role	Notes/Ref.
2017	Pigeon Tango	盜命師	Miu	
2019	Fall in Love at First Kiss	一吻定情	Sha Hui	
2019	Detention	返校	Miss Yin Tsui-han	
2019	Beyond The Dream	幻愛	Yan/Yip Lam	
2021	Drifting	濁水漂流	Miss Ho	
2021	Raya and the Last Dragon	魔龍王國	Namaari	Cantonese dub
2022	A Light Never Goes Out	燈火闌珊	Rainbow	
2023	Tales from the Occult: Body and Soul	失衡凶間之罪與殺		
2024	Stuntman	武替道	Cherry	
2024	Last Song for You	久別重逢	Ha Man-huen	
2025	Mudborn	泥娃娃	Hsu Mu-hua	

=== Television series ===
Year	English title	Original title	Role	Channel	Notes
2014	Below the Lion Rock 2014: Real Estate Agent	獅子山下2014：做地產	Fong Pui-yan	RTHK	
2017	My Very Short Marriage	短暫的婚姻	Malena	ViuTV	
2019	Triad Princess	極道千金	Ling Yun (Julia Lin)	Netflix	
2022	940920	940920	Lam Chor-ying	ViuTV	
2024	The Victims' Game	誰是被害者	Liu Shu-Yen	Netflix	
2024	Breeze by the Sea	不如海邊吹吹風	Xu Man		

=== Music video appearances ===
Year	Title	Artist
2020	"See You Next Time"	AGA
2021	"魂遊記"	Franco Yuen and Hins Cheung
2022	"Love 101"	Janice Vidal
2023	"Blind Marriage"	Eason Chan
2024	"Imprint"	Qiu Fengze

== Awards and nominations ==
Year	Award	Category	Nominated work	Result
2020	26th Hong Kong Film Critics Society Awards	Best Actress	Beyond the Dream	Won
2020	39th Hong Kong Film Awards	Best Actress	Beyond the Dream	Nominated
