= Chang Zhang-xing =

Taiwanese actor

- 張再興
- Born: 5 March 1986 (age 40); Changhua, Taiwan
- Occupations: Actor; director
- Years active: 2007–present
- Awards: 33rd Golden Harvest Award for Best Actor

Chinese name
- Traditional Chinese: 張再興
Transcriptions
Standard Mandarin
- Hanyu Pinyin: Zhāng Zàixìng
Southern Min
- Hokkien POJ: Tiuⁿ Chài-heng
- Musical career
- Label: Lan Se Production

Chang Zhang-xing (Chinese: 張再興; pinyin: Zhāng Zàixìng; Pe̍h-ōe-jī: Tiuⁿ Chài-heng; born 5 March 1986) is best known for his roles as gangster in various Taiwanese films and television series. He began his acting career in 2007, and is best known for his performance in The Pace of Consciousness, an autobiographical film that he wrote, directed, and starred in. For this film, he also received the 33rd Golden Harvest Award for Best Actor. He is currently studying in the College of Creative Media in Kun Shan University.

In August 2014, Chang joined the agency, Lan Se Production.

== Filmography ==
=== Directed works ===
- 2011 The Pace of Consciousness Writer, director, actor
- 2012 If the Blossoms Fall Writer, director
- 2014 When It Begins to Blossom Writer, director

=== As actor ===
==== Feature films ====
- Will You Still Be My Friend (2026)
- Passed By as Gangster boss
- Sweet Alibis as Ah Xing
- Mole of Lifeas Ah Xing
- Apolitical Romance as Ah De
- Legend of the T-Dog as Ah Xing
- Juliets
- When Love Comes as Ah Xing
- Monga as Ah Xing
- Marry My Dead Body as A-Gao

=== Short films ===
- Find the Money Dog as Gangster boss
- 布袋甩尾 as Ah Yong
- Miss Olivia as Wang Dong
- The Pace of Consciousness as Ah Xing
- If as Ah Xing

=== Television ===
- Baby Daddy as Ah Gou (Episodes 14, 15)
- Haru as Onitsuka
- 事事達人 as Right-hand man
- Sunset as Xiao Luo Sha
- Love You So as Brothel customer
- 阿爸的靈魂之旅 as Guang Hui
- Just Want to Live a Day Longer as Ah Gou
- Little Miss as Ah Yong
- Boys Can Fly as Ah Jin
- A Midsummer's Night in Tainan as Tattooed Man
- Feng Shui Family as Ah Xing (Episodes 1-5)
- 交錯 as Ah Xiong
- 第十二張生肖卡
- New Gun Story as Gangster
- Innocence as Ah Xing
- Ni Yada as Tiger
- Moonlight Friendship as Li Junan
- Fingerprint as Debt Collector
- Triad Princess as Lin Gui
- The Victims' Game as Liao
- The Fearless as Liang-Hu
