= Mama Boy =

- Film poster
- Traditional Chinese: 初戀慢半拍
- Simplified Chinese: 初恋慢半拍
- Hanyu Pinyin: Chūliàn Mànbànpāi
- Directed by: Arvin Chen
- Written by: Arvin Chen; Sunny Yu
- Produced by: Arvin Chen; Aileen Li
- Starring: Kai Ko; Vivian Hsu
- Cinematography: Jake Pollock
- Edited by: Chiang Yi-ning
- Music by: Hsu Wen
- Production companies: A Really Good Film Company; Cinemark; My Video; Third Man Entertainment; In Bloom Films
- Distributed by: Distribution Workshop; Applause Entertainment Limited (Taiwan)
- Release dates: April 25, 2022 (Udine, Italy); August 26, 2022 (Taiwan)
- Running time: 98 minutes
- Country: Taiwan
- Language: Mandarin

Mama Boy (Chinese: 初戀慢半拍) is a 2022 Taiwanese romance drama film directed and co-written by Arvin Chen, and starring Kai Ko, Vivian Hsu, Sara Yu and Fandy Fan. The film had its world premiere on April 25, 2022, at the 24th Far East Film Festival. The film had a theatrical release in Taiwan on August 26, 2022.

== Synopsis ==
The story describes the male protagonist Hsiao Hung, who is nearly 30 years old. Although his appearance is super handsome, Hong is not ready to lose his virginity and lives with his control-freak mother, Meiling. One day, under the introduction of his cousin, he met Lele, a woman who made him fall in love at first sight. A romantic love is here, it unfolds quietly at night in Taipei.

== Cast ==
- Kai Ko as Hsiao Hung
- Vivian Hsu as Le Le
- Sara Yu
- Fandy Fan
- Joanne Missingham
- Hou Yen-hsi
- Debbie Yao
