= Cha Cha for Twins =

- Official poster
- Directed by: Yang Yi-chien; Jim Wang
- Written by: Yang Yi-chien
- Produced by: Oliver Chen; Hank Tseng
- Starring: Huang Pei-jia
- Cinematography: Fu Fuji
- Edited by: Chiang Yi-ning
- Music by: Yang Wan-Chien
- Distributed by: Buena Vista Film Co. Ltd
- Release date: June 15, 2012 (Taiwan)
- Running time: 109 minutes
- Country: Taiwan
- Language: Mandarin

Cha Cha for Twins (Chinese: 寶米恰恰; Bao mi qia qia) is a 2012 Taiwanese romantic comedy film directed by Yang Yi-chien and Jim Wang.

The story involves identical twin sisters at age 17. Hormones have begun to kick in, and they are starting to have boy troubles. However, one of the boys that they date cannot even tell them apart.
