= Take Me to the Moon =

- Theatrical release poster
- Chinese: 帶我去月球
- Hanyu Pinyin: Dài wǒ qù yuè qiú
- Directed by: Hsieh Chun-yi
- Written by: Birdy Fong
- Produced by: Hsu Guo-lun
- Starring: Jasper Liu; Vivian Sung; Vera Yen; Shih Chih-tian; Pipi Yao; Lee Chuan
- Cinematography: Yao Hung-i
- Production companies: Goodfilms Workshop mm2 Entertainment
- Distributed by: Shine Time Entertainment
- Release date: December 1, 2017
- Running time: 105 minutes
- Country: Taiwan
- Language: Mandarin
- Box office: NT$14,671,083 (Total Admission: 67,154)(Taiwan); US$779,487 (Total Admission: 111,541)(Korea)

Take Me to the Moon is a 2017 Taiwanese romance film directed by Hsieh Chun-yi. The film stars Jasper Liu, Vivian Sung, Vera Yen, Shih Chih-tian, Pipi Yao and Lee Chuan. It was released in theaters on December 1, 2017.

== Premise ==
Cheng-hsiang reunites with the members of his high school band and reminisces about their lead singer and his past love, En-pei, whose pursuit of her dreams ended in tragedy. He regrets encouraging her to pursue her dreams all those years ago, wondering if she would have lived if he had not said anything to her. Drunk after the memorial and hit by a vehicle, Cheng-hsiang is miraculously transported back to the past, where he sets out to give better advice to En-pei.

== Cast ==
- Jasper Liu as Wang Cheng-hsiang
- Vivian Sung as Li En-pei
- Vera Yen as Hsiao-ba
- Shih Chih-tian as Da-bao
- Pipi Yao as Hsiao-fen
- Lee Chuan as Sheng
- Lu Hsueh-feng as Flower vendor
- Irene Luo as Ms. Chen
- Yuki Daki as Mr. Chen
- Kelly Kuo as En-pei's mother
- Yang Li-yin as Cheng-hsiang's mother
- Pu Hsueh-liang as Cheng-hsiang's father
- Landy Wen as Ruby
- Birdman C as Chang Yu-sheng

== Production ==
Filming began in September 2016.

The title of the film is a tribute to the song "Take Me to the Moon" by Chang Yu-sheng, which featured on the soundtrack of the film.

== Reception ==
=== Box office ===
Domestically, it received an indifferent response. The film grossed $14.6 million NTD, making it the top 12 Taiwanese film of 2017 and attracted an audience of 67,0154 in total.

In Korea, it was released under the title of "Hi, My Girl (안녕, 나의 소녀)" and attracted an audience of 111,541 in total, a higher following than domestic records, making it the 3rd highest grossing Taiwanese Film in Korea of all time. The film made Jasper Liu even more popular in Korea.
