= Stuntman (2024 film) =

2024 Hong Kong film by Albert Leung and Herbert Leung

- Theatrical poster
- Traditional Chinese: 武替道
- Literal meaning: The Way of Stuntman
- Jyutping: Mou^{5} Tai^{3} Dou^{6}
- Directed by: Albert Leung; Herbert Leung
- Screenplay by: Anastasia Tsang; Yip Wai-ping
- Produced by: Angus Chan
- Starring: Terrance Lau; Stephen Tung; Cecilia Choi; Philip Ng
- Cinematography: Ray Cheung
- Edited by: Albert Leung; Herbert Leung
- Music by: Chiu Tsang Hei; Andy Cheung
- Production company: Stuntman Film Production
- Distributed by: Edko Films
- Release date: 26 September 2024 (Hong Kong)
- Country: Hong Kong
- Language: Cantonese

Stuntman (Chinese: 武替道) is a 2024 Hong Kong action film directed by Albert and Herbert Leung, marking their directorial debut as part of the First Feature Film Initiative. The film stars Terrance Lau, Stephen Tung, Philip Ng, and Cecilia Choi, and examines the stunt industry within Hong Kong action cinema, following a washed-up action director (Tung) as he attempts to make a comeback with the help of a young and passionate stuntman (Lau).

Development of the screenplay began in 2013 but was rejected three times by the First Feature Film Initiative before screenwriter Anastasia Tsang joined the project and rewrote the story. The project was enlisted and greenlit in November 2022, with principal photography taking place in March 2023. This film marks Stephen Tung's return to acting after decades focused on behind-the-scenes work.

The film was released theatrically on 26 September 2024 in Hong Kong. It was nominated for a Golden Horse Award and a Hong Kong Film Award in Best Action Choreography.

== Plot ==
In the 1980s, Sam Lee, a passionate action director, choreographs a miscalculated jump that leaves a stuntman in his crew paralyzed. After the accident, Lee leaves the film industry and becomes a dit da practitioner.

In modern times, Lee is approached by an acquainted director Cho at a martial arts club dinner. Cho wants to film his swan song, envisioned as a 1980s-style action film, and suggests that Lee join the project as the action director. Lee reluctantly agrees out of friendship. Cho's film features Wai, a now international action star and former Lee's crew member, who despises Lee's ambitious and unsafe working methods. After some persuasion, Wai agrees to Lee's participation but insists on using his crew for the non-dangerous stunts. Lee then invites Long, a young stuntman he meets recently who works as a delivery man to make a living and has expressed his thoughts about leaving the stunt industry due to his brother's objections, to become his aide and stunt coordinator. Long happily accepts, although his relationship with his worried brother deteriorates.

On the first day of filming, Lee is late because he accompanies his estranged daughter Cherry to try on wedding gowns. Meanwhile, Wai's stunt team ignores Long on set and significantly alters Lee's choreography. Learning this, Lee rushes back to the set and engages in heated arguments with Wai, resulting in the early departure of the stunt crew. On Cho and Long's advice, Lee then tries to be more considerate in his filmmaking, while Long soon gains acceptance in the stunt community with his keen sense of choreography. When the producers announce budget cuts, the crew must minimize the scale of a bank robbery scene. However, Lee insists on retaining the gunfight sequences and has the crew shoot unauthorized scenes on the streets. Things go awry when police officers find the actor playing the getaway driver suspicious and interrogates him, causing him to miss the cue for the robber actors' exit. They are forced into an extended gunfight with the police actors. The unsuspecting pedestrians believe it is a real heist and tried to flee the scene, resulting in numerous injuries. Mesmerized by the momentum, Lee ignores the dangers and Wai's suggestion to halt filming, instead asking the cinematographers to focus on the injured pedestrians to capture their raw emotions. This creates further chaos, prompting police officers to respond immediately and arrest Lee and Long, who are playing a robber. Although they are eventually released, the production company has to pay substantial compensation to the injured pedestrians, and the incident draws public backlash. Consequently, Lee is fired from the crew.

Lee overhears Cherry expressing a desire for fireworks at her upcoming wedding, prompting him to request firecrackers from a friend in the props department. However, when he goes to pick them up at the production set, he learns that the climactic explosion scene has been cancelled and that Wai has rearranged all the action choreographies. Enraged, he confronts Wai, leading to a fight. Lee's suit is torn in the process, causing him to arrive late to Cherry's wedding, which angers her and leads her to ignore him all night. Cho contacts Lee, stating that the producers are dissatisfied with the ending and invites him to provide feedback on the rough cut. During the screening, Lee reconciles with Wai, who decides to fund a reshoot of the ending by taking a reduced paycheck. The reshoot begins, culminating in a final shot where Long must leap off a building followed by an explosion. The pulley is damaged in the trial run, and although Long is unharmed, the crew states it will take hours to fix the setup. Lee proposes performing the jump onto cardboard boxes. Initially hesitant, the crew reluctantly agrees when Long volunteers. Just as they collect a few cardboard boxes, Long's brother arrives with many more from his delivery business.

As the crew finishes building the cardboard box bed and Long prepares to jump, Lee advises him to go downstairs and wear more safety pads. At that moment, he informs the main crew that Long is ready, and performs the dangerous jump himself, landing beautifully against the backdrop of a large explosion.

== Cast ==
- Terrance Lau as Lee "Long" Sai-long, an aspiring stuntman who becomes Lee's stunt coordinator
- Stephen Tung as Sam Lee, a washed-up action director seeking a comeback after leaving the industry due to a serious injury he caused to a stuntman in his crew
  - Lam Yiu-sing as young Sam Lee
- Philip Ng as Wai, an international action star who began his career in Lee's stunt team
- Cecilia Choi as Cherry, Lee's estranged daughter

Also appearing in the film are Rachel Leung as Lee's deceased wife; Yen To as Cho, a veteran film director and acquaintance of Lee; Max Cheung as Kit, Long's older brother; Keith Ng and Terry Zou as the older and younger versions of Kam, a stuntman in Lee's crew who was paralyzed during a shoot; and Stephanie Che as Kuen, Kam's wife.

== Production ==
=== Development ===
After graduating from university in Canada and facing the dot-com bubble, twin brothers Albert and Herbert Leung returned to Hong Kong and pursued careers in the film industry, inspired by their childhood love of Hong Kong action films. However, after Twins Mission (2007), they did not receive any new film offers and eventually transitioned to other careers. During this time, the brothers conceived the idea of producing a film that captures the rise and decline of Hong Kong action cinema, beginning to develop a screenplay in 2013. The story is heavily inspired by the Leung brothers' own experiences in the stunt industry. Several plot points also reference real-life events, such as the unauthorized shooting of gunfight sequences on the street and the subsequent arrest of the filming crew echo the crime action film As Tears Go By (1988), with Jacky Cheung being the one who was injured during the shoot; while the final cardboard box leap references the action film Heart of Dragon (1985), with Chin Kar-lok being one of the stunt actors who performed the leap. The Leung brothers submitted the draft to the First Feature Film Initiative three times but were unsuccessful. Subsequently, they befriended director-screenwriter Anastasia Tsang, who offered to rewrite the script. In November 2022, their revised screenplay draft won the First Feature Film Initiative, leading to the film being greenlit, with Angus Chan announced as the producer.

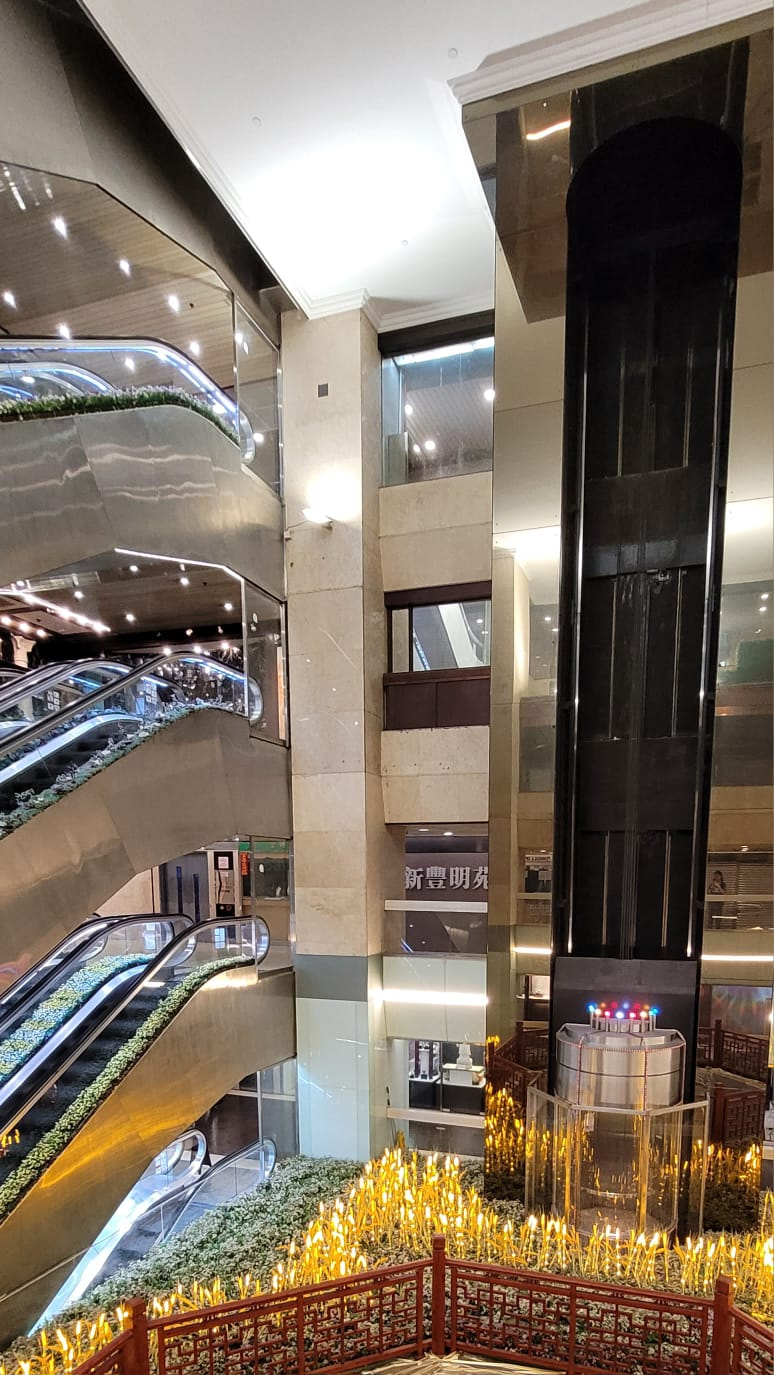
The bank of escalators in Peninsula Centre, where the opening fight sequences was filmed

Stephen Tung was set to be the lead actor in the early stages of the project. While writing at a café at the Avenue of Stars, Albert Leung was inspired by the statue of Bruce Lee and envisioned finding an actor who had co-starred with him, where Tung, who had filmed Enter the Dragon (1973) with Lee, came to mind. With the help of action choreographer Benz Kong, they contacted Tung, who, despite having quit acting to focus on behind-the-scenes work for decades, agreed to return to film, stating he was "moved" by the story. Albert Leung also envisioned Philip Ng for the role of Wai when creating the character. Ng, whose father was a brother-in-arms with the Leung brothers' father, was already familiar with them and agreed to join the project on the spot when approached by Albert and the film's producer Angus Chan at a birthday party. The Leung brothers were initially hesitant about casting Long, as there are limited young action stars today, and ultimately chose Terrance Lau for the role, believing he could convincingly portray the physique and skills of a stuntman. In March 2023, Lau, Tung, Ng, Cecilia Choi, Lam Yiu-sing, and Rachel Leung were announced as the main cast. In May 2023, the film was presented at the project market of the 76th Cannes Film Festival, during a new event "New Cinema, New Talents" hosted by the Hong Kong Film Development Council. An official trailer was released in August 2024, and distribution rights for the United Kingdom and Ireland were acquired by Trinity CineAsia in September.

=== Filming ===
Principal photography began on 4 March 2023 in Kwun Tong. The shoot spanned 19 days, with 13 of those days dedicated to filming action scenes. The opening scene, designed to evoke the action and visual style of a 1980s Hong Kong action film, was shot at the bank of escalators inside the Peninsula Centre in East Tsim Sha Tsui. Location shooting also took place at the business district and promenade of Tsim Sha Tsui. Filming wrapped up on 29 March.

== Release ==
Stuntman premiered at MCL Movie Town on 16 September 2024, and was released theatrically on 26 September in Hong Kong. The film was also screened at the 44th Hawaii International Film Festival, marking its international premiere, and at the 25th Newport Beach Film Festival.

== Reception ==
=== Box office ===
Stuntman grossed approximately HK$3 million in its opening weekend, and accumulated HK$5 million by the second week. The film raked in HK$9 million after one month of release.

=== Critical response ===
Edmund Lee of South China Morning Post gave Stuntman 3.5/5 stars, describing it as a "passionate homage" to Hong Kong's golden age of action filmmaking in the 1980s and 90s, while acknowledging Stephen Tung's compelling performance and the film's critique of the unsafe practices of old-school filmmaking, as well as its sentimental themes such as passion, redemption, and familial reconnection. Lee also ranked the film seventh out of the 36 Hong Kong films theatrically released in 2024. Thomas Kong of Esquire also praised the performances of veteran actor Stephen Tung and younger leads Terrance Lau and Philip Ng as a heartfelt tribute to the struggles of Hong Kong action actors which shows their passion and dedication while effectively presenting the contrasting experiences of the characters.

Leslie Felperin of The Guardian gave the film 2/5 stars, offering a critical review that suggests it appeals more to hardcore fans of Hong Kong cinema than to mainstream viewers, as it examines the identity crisis of the contemporary Hong Kong film industry through a nostalgic lens and "duly impressive" stunts, but ultimately comes across as "thuddingly sentimental" and featured conservative family values and underdeveloped characters. Amy Mullins of China Daily also viewed the film as effectively blending nostalgia for classic Hong Kong action cinema with a modern perspective and presented the evolving dynamics between old and new approaches to filmmaking through the strong performances of Stephen Tung and Philip Ng, though it could benefit from deeper character development.

Chow Kit of am730 compared Stuntman to the Hollywood film The Fall Guy (2024), noting that while both share a similar theme, The Fall Guy takes a more commercial approach, whereas this film offers a thoughtful homage to the struggles and realities of the Hong Kong action film industry, reflecting a deeper commentary on the current state of cinema in Hong Kong. Alex Chung, writing for HK01, called the film a powerful tribute to the dedication of action actors in Hong Kong cinema, featuring impressive action scenes and an exploration on familial relationships, while effectively capturing the spirit of collaboration within the filmmaking community.

== Awards and nominations ==
Year	Award	Category	Nominee	Result	Ref.
2024	61st Golden Horse Awards	Best Action Choreography	Benz Kong, Tommy Leung	Nominated	
2025	43rd Hong Kong Film Awards	Best Action Choreography	Benz Kong, Tommy Leung	Nominated	
2025	43rd Hong Kong Film Awards	Best New Director	Albert Leung, Herbert Leung	Nominated	
