= Before We Get Married =

Taiwanese television series

- Official poster
- 我們不能是朋友
- Genre: Romance
- Based on: Before We Get Married (我們不能是朋友) by Ayamei 阿亞梅
- Written by: Li Xu Min 李旭敏 (Screenwriter coordinator); Xie Yu Xiu 謝育秀 (Screenwriter coordinator); Zhuang Xin Fu 莊心輔; Fei Gong Yi 費工怡; Li Song Lin 李松霖; Fang-Yun Tsai 蔡芳紜; Huang Guan Ting 黃莞婷; Lai Yu Xuan 賴瑀瑄; Li Ting Yu 李庭瑜; Cai Qiu Yi 蔡秋儀
- Directed by: Feng Kai 馮凱
- Starring: Jasper Liu; Puff Kuo
- Opening theme: Giving In 退讓 by Tseng Yu-jia
- Ending theme: I Miss You More 我比從前想你了 by Bii
- Country of origin: Taiwan
- Original language: Mandarin
- No. of episodes: 13

Production
- Producers: Chen Cai Yu 陳財裕; Huang Ling Rong 黃琳容
- Production location: Taiwan
- Production companies: Jason's Entertainment Co.Ltd. 友松娛樂股份有限公司; Gala Television 八大電視股份有限公司

Original release
- Network: TTV; GTV Drama; GTV Variety Show
- Release: 31 May – 23 August 2019

Before We Get Married (Chinese: 我們不能是朋友; pinyin: wo men bu neng shi peng you; lit. ''We Cannot Be Friends'') is a 2019 Taiwanese romance TV series created and produced by Gala Television and Jason's Entertainment. The story is adapted from an original novel of the same title, penned by the screenwriter Fang-Yun Tsai 蔡芳紜, or also known by her pen name Ayamei 阿亞梅, who is also the screenwriter of popular Taiwanese series Love @ Seventeen and Boysitter. Directed by Feng Kai, the series stars Jasper Liu and Puff Kuo as the main cast, both are reunited for the second time after Taiwanese series Pleasantly Surprised. Filming began in September 2018.

== Synopsis ==
Zhou Weiwei is in a serious relationship with her earnest and average boyfriend Li Haoyi who works in the same company as her. Haoyi adheres to a strict planning of their lives and Weiwei faithfully follows it. On the other hand, Chu Kehuan is a capable and talented stock trader earmarked to be CEO of the securities company he is working for. He is in an unhappy 10-year-long relationship with Gao Ziyuan, a beautiful woman who spends lavishly and devotes her life to him.

An unexpected meeting between Zhou Weiwei and Chu Kehuan leads to Kehuan being enamoured with her thrifty principles and strong personality. Kehuan sets out to woo her but Weiwei is committed to Haoyi and is turned off by Kehuan's unfaithfulness. Weiwei is furthermore horrified when she discovers that he is actually the boyfriend of her college classmate. Despite this, Weiwei begins to doubt her relationship with Haoyi and finds herself drawn to Kehuan. When Haoyi insists on buying a house for them, they accidentally stumble onto Kehuan and Ziyuan's home. Because of its high price and Kehuan's flirty antics, Weiwei insists on turning down the offer. Kehuan approaches her and makes her an indecent proposal for her to spend a night with him in exchange for a discount. Though she agrees, Kehuan stops it. Despite their encounter failing to come to fruition, Kehuan still offers to give them the discount.

During a housewarming party, Haoyi invites Ziyuan and Kehuan to thank them. There, Kehuan kisses Weiwei while Ziyuan and Haoyi are gone. Weiwei reciprocates but quickly pulls away. He offers her the choice of staying and waiting for their significant others or running away together. Before she can answer, Ziyuan and Haoyi return. Haoyi proposes to Weiwei, and Kehuan is devastated when Weiwei accepts his proposal. Realizing that he can not spend the rest of his life with Ziyuan, Kehuan breaks up with her.

Haoyi is later offered a higher paying job and resigns, leaving Weiwei upset that he would not discuss such an important decision with her. Their relationship is further strained when he leaves for Shanghai for half a year, postponing their wedding. Kehuan comforts Weiwei while she battles loneliness and feeling unloved by Haoyi. Though Weiwei is determined to distance herself from Kehuan, a work-related trip brings them together and their bond grows stronger. She almost sleeps with Kehuan but stops after receiving a phone call from Haoyi. She admits her feelings for Kehuan but because she cares for Haoyi, she is unwilling to break off the engagement. To mend her and Haoyi's relationship, she flies to Shanghai and realizes that he has never truly understood her or her plans for the future. She breaks off the engagement and travels back to Taipei, where Kehuan attempts to start a relationship with her. Their attempts at being together is complicated by Ziyuan and Haoyi's unwillingness to let them go, and their new roles in Kehuan and Weiwei's work project.

In the end, Weiwei and Kehuan resign from their positions. Weiwei decides that she must discover herself before starting a relationship with Kehuan, who vows to wait for her. They are finally reunited at a friend's wedding where Weiwei offers to take Kehuan out on a date.

== Cast ==
=== Main cast ===
- Jasper Liu as Chu Ke Huan
- Puff Kuo as Zhou Wei Wei
- Steven Sun as Li Hao Yi
- Nita Lei as Gao Zi Yuan

=== Supporting cast ===
- Phoebe Yuan as Han Ke Fei
- Chen Mu as Yan Bai Yang
- Leo Lee as Liu Da Wei
- Chen Yu (actress) as Gao Zi Ting
- Elaine Ho as Wang Mei Ling
- Wu Guang Jun as James
- Cai Yun Xi as Ai Mi
- Zhao Fan Xuan as Fan Fan
- Song Cheng Xi as Cheng Xi
- Xina Sui as Bu Lan

=== Guest actors ===
- Pa Yu as Jessica
- Samuel Gu as Wu Shu Ming
- Huang Wei Ting as Jia En
- Esther Liu as Mai Ruo Yun
- Bright Pu as Li Jin Hui
- Tiffany Pan as general manager's wife
- Jian Chang as Chairman Wang
- Ming Dao as himself

== Soundtrack ==
- "Giving In 退讓" by Tseng Yu-jia
- "I Miss You More 我比從前想你了" by Bii
- "I'm Still Missing You 我還想念你" by Bii
- "All You Did 都是你害的" by Bii
- "What About You 那你呢" by Rennie Wang
- "I'd Like to Hear the Details 願聞其詳" by Fang Wu
- "The End 句點" by Dino Lee
- "Darling" by Mavis Fan
- "Digital Love 數字戀愛" by Mavis Fan
- "Have or Have Not 有沒有" by William Wei

== Broadcast ==
| Network | Country | Airing Date | Timeslot |
|---|---|---|---|
| TTV Main Channel | Taiwan | May 31, 2019 | Friday 10:00-11:30 pm |
| iQiyi | Taiwan | May 31, 2019 | Friday 11:30 pm |
| LINE TV | Taiwan | May 31, 2019 | Friday 11:30 pm |
| WeTV | Taiwan | May 31, 2019 | Friday 11:30 pm |
| GTV Drama | Taiwan | June 2, 2019 | Sunday 8:00-9:30 pm |
| LiTV | Taiwan | June 2, 2019 | Sunday 9:30 pm |
| GTV Variety Show | Taiwan | June 9, 2019 | Sunday 9:30-11:00 pm |
| KKTV | Taiwan | June 9, 2019 | Sunday 11:00 pm |
| Viki | Europe; America; India | May 31, 2019 | Friday 24:00 |
| iQiyi | China | June 28, 2019 | Friday 10:00 pm |
| Tencent Video | China | June 28, 2019 | Friday 10:00 pm |
| Mango TV | Taiwan; Hong Kong; Macau | June 28, 2019 | Friday 10:00 pm |
| Astro Go VOD | Malaysia; Brunei | June 28, 2019 | |
| Kapamilya Channel/A2Z | Philippines | 2021 | TBA |

== Ratings ==
Competing programmes on rival channels airing at the same time slot were:
- FTV - New Style (TV series)
- EBC Variety - Hello Doctor (TV series)
- SET Metro - A Thousand Goodnights, Yong-jiu Grocery Store
- SET Taiwan - Holy King Legend, The Love Story In Banana Orchard
- CTV - Moon Embracing the Sun, Empress Ki
- CTS - Yong-jiu Grocery Store

| Air Date | Episode | Average Ratings | Rank |
|---|---|---|---|
| May 31, 2019 | 1 | 0.57 | 4 |
| Jun 7, 2019 | 2 | 0.62 | 4 |
| Jun 14, 2019 | 3 | 0.71 | 3 |
| Jun 21, 2019 | 4 | 0.68 | 3 |
| Jun 28, 2019 | 5 | 0.75 | 3 |
| Jul 5, 2019 | 6 | 0.73 | 3 |
| Jul 12, 2019 | 7 | 0.87 | 3 |
| Jul 19, 2019 | 8 | 1.06 | 2 |
| Jul 26, 2019 | 9 | 0.91 | 2 |
| Aug 2, 2019 | 10 | 1.01 | 3 |
| Aug 9, 2019 | 11 | 1.22 | 2 |
| Aug 16, 2019 | 12 | 1.24 | 3 |
| Aug 23, 2019 | 13 | 1.36 | 2 |
| Average ratings | | 0.90 | |

== Remake ==
- Vietnam - This series is remade in Vietnam as Yêu trước ngày cưới, aired directly on VieOn in November 10, 2023.

== Awards and nominations ==
| Year | Ceremony | Category | Nominee | Result |
|---|---|---|---|---|
| 2020 | 55th Golden Bell Awards | Best Supporting Actress in a Television Series | Phoebe Yuan | Nominated |
