= Green Door (miniseries) =

2019 Taiwanese television miniseries

- Promotional poster
- Chinese: 魂囚西門
- Based on: Green Door by Joseph Chen
- Written by: Lee Ting-yu; Tsai Fang-yun; Huang Wan-ting; Lingo Hsieh
- Directed by: Lingo Hsieh
- Starring: Jam Hsiao; Kuo Bea-ting; Enno Cheng; Hsieh Ying-xuan
- Ending theme: "Haunting Me" by Jam Hsiao
- Composers: Alexander Wong; Sean Shinwon Kim; Ian Chen
- Country of origin: Taiwan
- Original languages: Mandarin; Taiwanese Hokkien
- No. of seasons: 1
- No. of episodes: 6

Production
- Executive producer: Yu Pei-hua
- Producer: Jackol Kao
- Cinematography: Stanley Liu
- Editors: Shieh Meng-ju; Chiang Yi-ning
- Running time: 47–50 minutes
- Production company: The Voice Creative

Original release
- Network: Public Television Service
- Release: February 16 – March 16, 2019

Green Door is a 2019 Taiwanese horror thriller drama television miniseries directed and co-written by Lingo Hsieh, based on the novel of the same name by Joseph Chen. The miniseries stars Jam Hsiao, Kuo Bea-ting, Enno Cheng, and Hsieh Ying-xuan. It follows a troubled psychologist who returns from the United States to set up a psychology clinic called Green Door in Taiwan, where mysterious patients and uncanny events shed light on his murky past.

== Cast ==
- Jam Hsiao as Wei Sung-yen
- Bea Hayden as Hung Yu-mei
- Enno Cheng as Liu Zao-yun
- Wan-Ru Zhan as Mary
- Hsieh Ying-hsuan as Yu Hsiu-chi
- Yi-Ting Wu as Elly
- Hai-Yung Shen as Chang Li-hua
- Ya-yun Lan as Doris
- Wei-Hua Lan as Shen Jin-fa
- Kurt Chou as Major
- Chiang Ting as Grandpa Chu
- Yueh-hsin Chu as Master Hsu-kung
- Yu-Chieh Cheng as Chen Hao-chieh

== Release ==
Green Door premiered on PTS on February 16, 2019, and concluded on March 16, 2019, consisting of six episodes.

Netflix picked up global streaming rights to the series and released it on March 16, 2019.

== Awards and nominations ==
Year	Award	Category	Nominee(s)	Result
2019	54th Golden Bell Awards	Best Miniseries	Green Door	Nominated
2019	54th Golden Bell Awards	Best Actress in a Miniseries or Television Film	Hsieh Ying-xuan	Nominated
2019	54th Golden Bell Awards	Best Sound	R.T. Kao; Sun Shao-ting; Alexander Wong; Ian Chen; Aki Chen	Nominated
