= Nana Lee =

Nana Willems

Background information
- Birth name: Ratna Sari Juwita
- Also known as: Nana Lee
- Born: January 29, 1985 (age 40)
- Origin: Jakarta, Indonesia
- Genres: Jazz, Pop, R&B
- Occupation(s): singer, songwriter
- Years active: 2003–present

Nana Lee (born January 29, 1985) is an Indonesian singer and songwriter. She is best known for taking part in Super Idol Taiwan.

== Career ==
Born in Jakarta, Nana became interested in music and acting at an early age. She performed in amateur theatre productions and landed minor roles on various television shows during her high school years. Her singing career started in 2003. In a November 2009 interview, Nana indicated her music is primary influenced by Jazz, Pop, R&B and Chinese songs. She performs regularly at festivals and jazz clubs and on national TV in Indonesia and Taiwan.

In 2009, Nana released her debut album Be+Positive and followed it a year later with Women in love in cooperation with famed music arranger Idang Rasjidi. In 2011, she launched her third album, Tribute to Koes Plus in Bossanova, which outperformed the success of its predecessors. Nana received nationwide publicity by taking part in the 2013 Super Idol Taiwan. In 2014, she released the indie album Positivity.

Nana made her debut in Europe in January 2014. She represented Indonesia at the Indonesian Night of the World Economic Forum at its annual meeting in Davos, Switzerland. In the same year, she wrote and recorded Go Indonesia, which is used by Indonesia's first English TV channel The Indonesia Channel (TIC) as its theme song.

== Discography ==
- Be+Positive (2009)
- Women in love (2010)
- Tribute to Koes Plus in Bossanova (2011)
- Positivity (2014)

== Awards and accomplishments ==
- 2012 Best Performance Act award at Let Taiwan see the World festival
- 2013 Winner of Face Off in Super Idol Taiwan representing Indonesia
