= The Bride (2015 Taiwanese film) =

- Traditional Chinese: 屍憶
- Hanyu Pinyin: shī yì
- Hokkien POJ: si-ek
- Directed by: Lingo Hsieh
- Screenplay by: Lingo Hsieh; Chun-Pin Tsai; Takashige Ichise
- Produced by: Takashige Ichise
- Starring: Wu Kang-ren; Nikki Hsieh; Vera Yen; Chie Tanaka
- Distributed by: Applause Entertainment Limited
- Release date: 20 August 2015 (Taiwan)
- Running time: 89 minutes
- Country: Taiwan
- Languages: Mandarin, Taiwanese

The Bride (Chinese: 屍憶; pinyin: shī yì; Pe̍h-ōe-jī: si-ek) is a 2015 Taiwanese horror film directed by Lingo Hsieh and starring Wu Kang-ren, Nikki Hsieh, Vera Yen, and Chie Tanaka. The film explores the local custom of ghost marriage, and it has been described as having restarted the local horror genre in Taiwan. The film was nominated for best narrative at the 18th Taipei Film Festival in 2016.

== Plot ==
Liu Cheng-Hao (Wu Kang-ren), producer of a supernatural tv show, is successful in both life and love: not only is work going smoothly, but him and his fiancee (Nikki Hsieh) live together happily. After Cheng-Hao picks up a strange red envelope in the park, however, he begins to have recurrent nightmares about an old house.

Senior high school student Yin-Yin (Vera Yen) has had the Yin and Yang eye (Chinese: 陰陽眼); since she was little, she has been able to see things that are not really there. However, recently the monstrosities appearing before her have become increasingly severe.

All clues point to the old house deep in the mountains that has been forgotten long ago.

== Cast ==
- Wu Kang-ren as Liu Cheng-Hao (劉承皓)
- Nikki Hsieh as Chen Yung-Chieh (陳永潔)
- Vera Yen as Lin Yin-Yin (林茵茵)
- Chie Tanaka as Wang Yi-Han (王依涵)
- Andrew Chen as Chang Kai-Hsiang (張凱翔)
- Ching-Hsia Chiang as Hsuan Chen (玄真)
- Ikehata Reina as Nana (奈奈)
- Iling Kao as Yin-Yin's mother
- Lingyuan Kung as Kung Ling-Pao (孔令爆)
- Chen-Lin Wang as Wang Chia-Hui (王佳惠)
- Ning Chang as female ghost

== Release ==
The film was released in Taiwan on 20 August 2015. It took TWD 16 million at the box office, taking over TWD 10 million in its first week.

=== Critical reception ===
Chang Che-Ming of ET Today praised the atmosphere of the film, but observed that, "every character's reason for existing seems to be only to move the plot along" thus "all emotional twists are too fleeting and unrealistic." James Mudge of Eastern Kicks gave the film 3.5 of 5 stars, praising Lingo Hsieh's direction and saying that while, "there’s nothing original or terribly creative here, most of the film’s twists and themes having been covered before, meaning that most viewers will spot the ending coming from very early on." He also cited the film's "culturally Taiwanese grounding" as providing a particularly creepy atmosphere.
