= Arvin Chen =

American film director

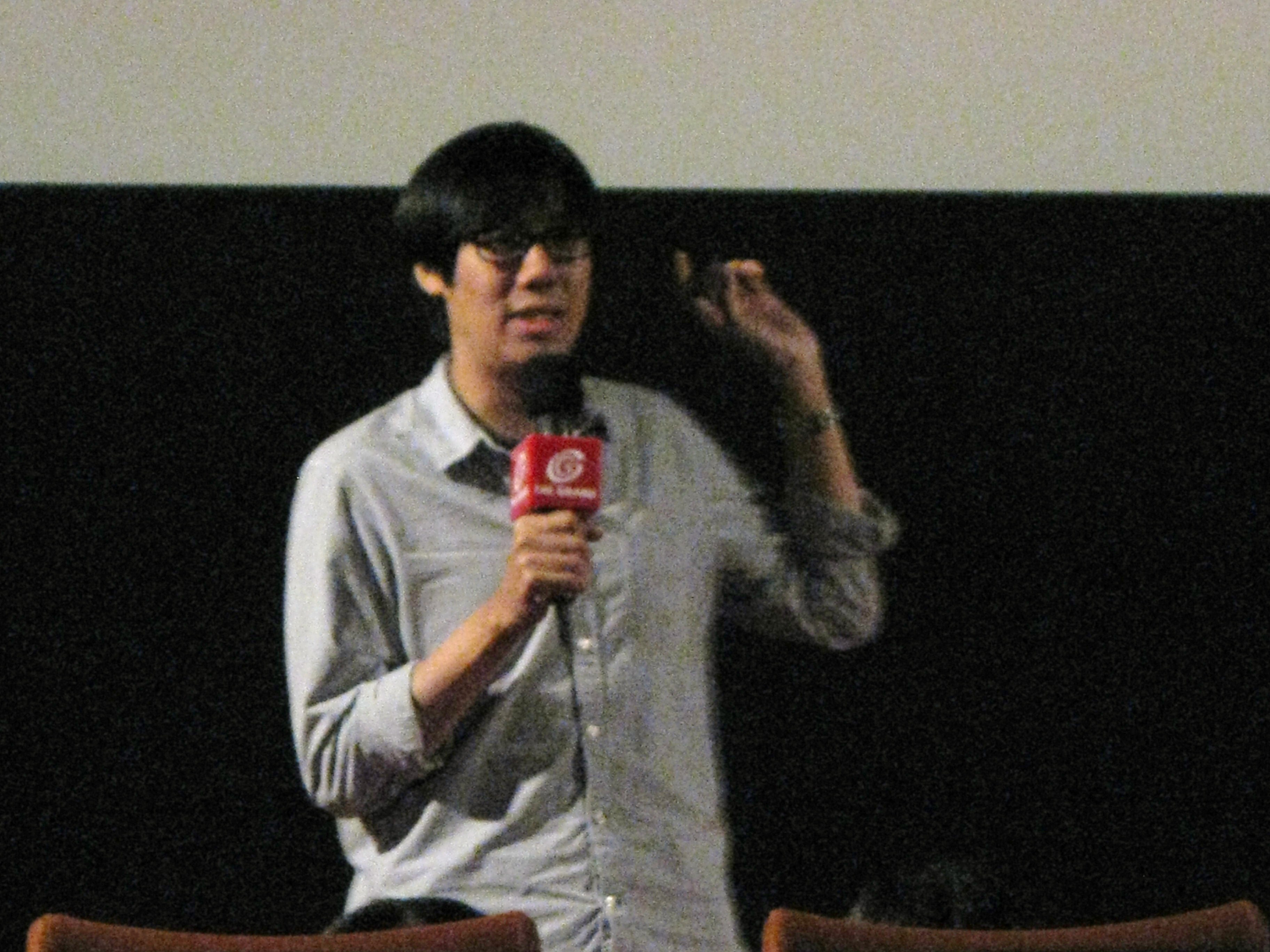
- Education: University of California Berkeley (BA); University of Southern California (MFA)
- Awards: Silver Bear Award; 2006 Mei; Netpac Award (Berlinale); 2010 Au Revoir Taipei

Arvin Chen
- Traditional Chinese: 陳駿霖
- Simplified Chinese: 陈骏霖
Transcriptions
Standard Mandarin
- Hanyu Pinyin: Chén Jùnlín
- IPA: [ʈʂʰə̌n tɕwə̂nlǐn]
Southern Min
- Hokkien POJ: Tân Chùn-lîm

Arvin Chen (born 26 November 1978) is a Taiwanese-American director and screenwriter. He is best known for his film Au Revoir Taipei.

== Early life ==
Chen was born and raised in the United States. His parents were immigrants from Taiwan. He was born in Boston. He grew up mostly in Foster City in the Bay Area, went to San Mateo High School and attended U.C. Berkeley majoring in architecture. In 2006, he earned a MFA in film production at the University of Southern California. He is the cousin of freelance writer and rock musician Kaiser Kuo.

== Career ==
After graduating from college, he moved to Taiwan in 2001 where he obtained a job working for director Edward Yang, who he describes “is kind of a family friend.” It was this experience working in Taiwan cinema that reaffirmed his interest in film-making. Soon after, he enrolled in film school between 2003 and 2006 at the University of Southern California, where he made his first short film Mei. It won the 2007 Silver Bear in Berlin's International Short Film Competition.

=== Feature films ===
==== Au Revoir Taipei ====
Chen went on to work on his first feature-length film, Au Revoir Taipei, which he both directed and wrote. Although he wasn't fluent in Mandarin, his friends had helped him with some translation for the script. The script writing process was one of the challenges he experienced in this field. Au Revoir Taipei won the Best Asian Film Award from the Network for the Promotion of Asian Cinema (NETPAC) at the 2010 Berlin International Film Festival. The film also won the Jury Prize for Best Film at the 2010 Deauville Asian Film Festival, and an Audience Award for Best Narrative Feature Film at the 2010 San Francisco International Asian American Film Festival. The film was also nominated for an Independent Spirit Award (Producers Award for producer In-Ah Lee) and also the Lino Brocka Award in the international competition of the 2010 Cinemanila International Film Festival.

==== Will You Still Love Me Tomorrow ====
Chen's second film is the 2013 romantic comedy Will You Still Love Me Tomorrow? (明天記得愛上我), starring Richie Jen and Mavis Fan, and which he also both directed and wrote. The film had its world premiere at the 2013 Berlin International Film Festival, and was selected for the World Narrative Competition of the 2013 Tribeca Film Festival. At the 2013 Tribeca Film Festival, it was also nominated for Best Narrative Feature. The film was also nominated for a Best Supporting Actress award (Mavis Fan) at the 2014 Asian Film Awards, an Audience Choice Award at the 2013 Chicago International Film Festival, an Outstanding Film (Limited Release) award at the 2015 GLAAD Media Awards, and a FIPRESCI Prize from the 2013 Hong Kong International Film Festival.

==== Mama Boy ====
Chen's third film is the 2022 romantic comedy drama Mama Boy (初戀慢半拍), which he both directed and co-wrote, starring Kai Ko and Vivian Hsu. The film had its world premiere at the 24th Far East Film Festival, and premiered as the opening film at the 24th Taipei Film Festival.

==== Love in Taipei ====
Chen directed the 2023 Paramount+ romantic comedy film Love in Taipei.

==== Pachinko ====
Chen directed several episodes of the Apple TV+ series Pachinko.

=== Short films ===
Chen's first short film, Mei, made when he was studying at the University of Southern California, won the Silver Berlin Bear award for "Best Short Film" at the 2007 Berlin International Film Festival. It was also nominated for a Golden Berlin Bear award.

In addition, Chen directed and wrote a short film in the Taiwanese omnibus film, 10+10, entitled "Lane 256" - about the experiences of a couple moving into a new apartment.

Chen also directed and wrote a short film in the omnibus film Eat (2008) - a compilation of short films from 3 directors that explores the subjects of food and love - where Daniel Jai Lee and Jon Maxwell were the other two directors who contributed segments to the film.

=== Music videos ===
Chen has directed several music videos for singer-songwriter Dawen (王大文), including "Beautiful" and "Acid Rain."
