= Triad Princess =

2019 Taiwanese television series

- Traditional Chinese: 極道千金
- Simplified Chinese: 极道千金
- Literal meaning: Gokudō's Daughter
- Hanyu Pinyin: jí dào qiān jīn
- Jyutping: gik6 dou6 cin1 gam1
- Genre: Romantic comedy; Action
- Based on: Steven Tu; Rita Chuang
- Written by: Neal Wu; Emma Chen; Cheng Han-wen; Huang Shi-ting
- Directed by: Neal Wu
- Starring: Jasper Liu; Eugenie Liu; Chang Zhang-xing; Hung Yan-siang
- Theme music composer: Chris Hou
- Country of origin: Taiwan
- Original languages: Mandarin; Taiwanese Hokkien
- No. of seasons: 1
- No. of episodes: 6

Production
- Executive producers: Rita Chuang; Melvin Ang; Gary Goh
- Producers: Tung Ting-an; Lek Mei-zhen
- Production locations: Taipei; New Taipei City; Kaohsiung
- Cinematography: Chiang Min-chung
- Editors: Liu Yen-fu; Chiang Yi-ning; Shieh Meng-ju
- Running time: 35–47 minutes
- Production companies: Goodfilms Workshop; mm2 Entertainment

Original release
- Network: Netflix
- Release: 6 December 2019

Triad Princess (Chinese: 極道千金; pinyin: Jí dào qiān jīn) is a 2019 Taiwanese Netflix original series. It is Netflix's second original Mandarin-language series after Nowhere Man. Directed by Neal Wu, a bestselling author and the director of film At Cafe 6, it stars Eugenie Liu and Jasper Liu as the main cast.

== Synopsis ==
Growing up in the shadow of her Triad father, Angie craves an independent life of her own. Defying her father's wishes, she takes on a gig as an undercover bodyguard for a famous actress at an agency, where she must navigate the unfamiliar world of glitz, glamour and even love.

== Cast ==
=== Main ===
- Eugenie Liu as Angie Ni, the daughter of Cosmos gang's boss
- Jasper Liu as Jasper Yi-hang Xu, a superstar in Asia
- Chang Zhang-xing as Lin Gui, an orphan who is a member of Cosmos gang
- Hung Yan-siang as Ding-ding, Angie's best friend

=== Special guest ===
- Cecilia Choi Sze-wan as Ling Yun, a.k.a. Julia Lin, a celebrity and Yi-hang's fake girlfriend
- Tsao Yu-ning as Eddie Kim, the son of Golden Dragon's boss and Angie's fiancé

=== Recurring ===
- Tien-hsin as Sophia Kwong, the manager of Yi-hang and Ling Yun
- Michael JQ Huang as Ni Kun, the boss of Cosmos gang
- Cheung Ka-nin as Kim Hong-tian, the boss of Golden Dragon
- HanGee Lui as Cai-tou (Radish), a member of Cosmos gang
- Amanda Liu as Nana, the assistant of Sophia
- Chen Ray-wei as Pineapple, a member of Cosmos gang
- Chang Shu-wei as Wang Jin-guo, Yun's ex-boyfriend

=== Guest ===
- Lee Lee-zen as Chen Da-hui, Sophia's ex-husband
- Beatrice Fang as an actress who was Yi-hang's ex-girlfriend
- Toyoharu Kitamura as a miniseries director
- Tsai Ming-hsiu as Ah-ji (Lucky)
- Brando Huang as Li Jian-dong
- Hong Sheng-tei as the Police Chief
- Mickey Huang as Luo Zheng-fu

== Episodes ==
No.	Title	Original release date
1	"Shing Bwei"	December 6, 2019
2	"Elephant Studio"	December 6, 2019
3	"The Scumbag"	December 6, 2019
4	"Let Me Tell You a Secret"	December 6, 2019
5	"We Had a Deal"	December 6, 2019
6	"The Fortune"	December 6, 2019

== Awards and nominations ==
Year	Ceremony	Category	Nominee	Result
2020	55th Golden Bell Awards	Best Cinematography	Chiang Min-chung	Nominated
