= Golden Bell Award for Best Editing for a Drama Series =

Award for editing for a drama series

- Awarded for: Best Editing for a Drama Series
- Location: Taiwan
- Presented by: Bureau of Audiovisual and Music Industry Development
- First award: 1980
- Currently held by: Lei Cheng-ching for Women in Taipei (2023)
- Website: gba.tavis.tw

The Golden Bell Award for Best Editing for a Drama Series (Chinese: 電視金鐘獎戲劇類節目剪輯獎) is one of the categories of the competition for Taiwanese television production, Golden Bell Awards. It has been awarded since 1980.

== Winners ==
=== 2020s ===
Year	English title	Original title	Ref
2020; 55th Golden Bell Awards	The Making of an Ordinary Woman	俗女養成記	
2021; 56th Golden Bell Awards	The Cleaner	公視人生劇展─《人生清理員》	
2022; 57th Golden Bell Awards	Gold Leaf	茶金	
2023; 58th Golden Bell Awards	Women in Taipei	台北女子圖鑑	
