= Chie Tanaka =

Japanese model and actress (born 1981)

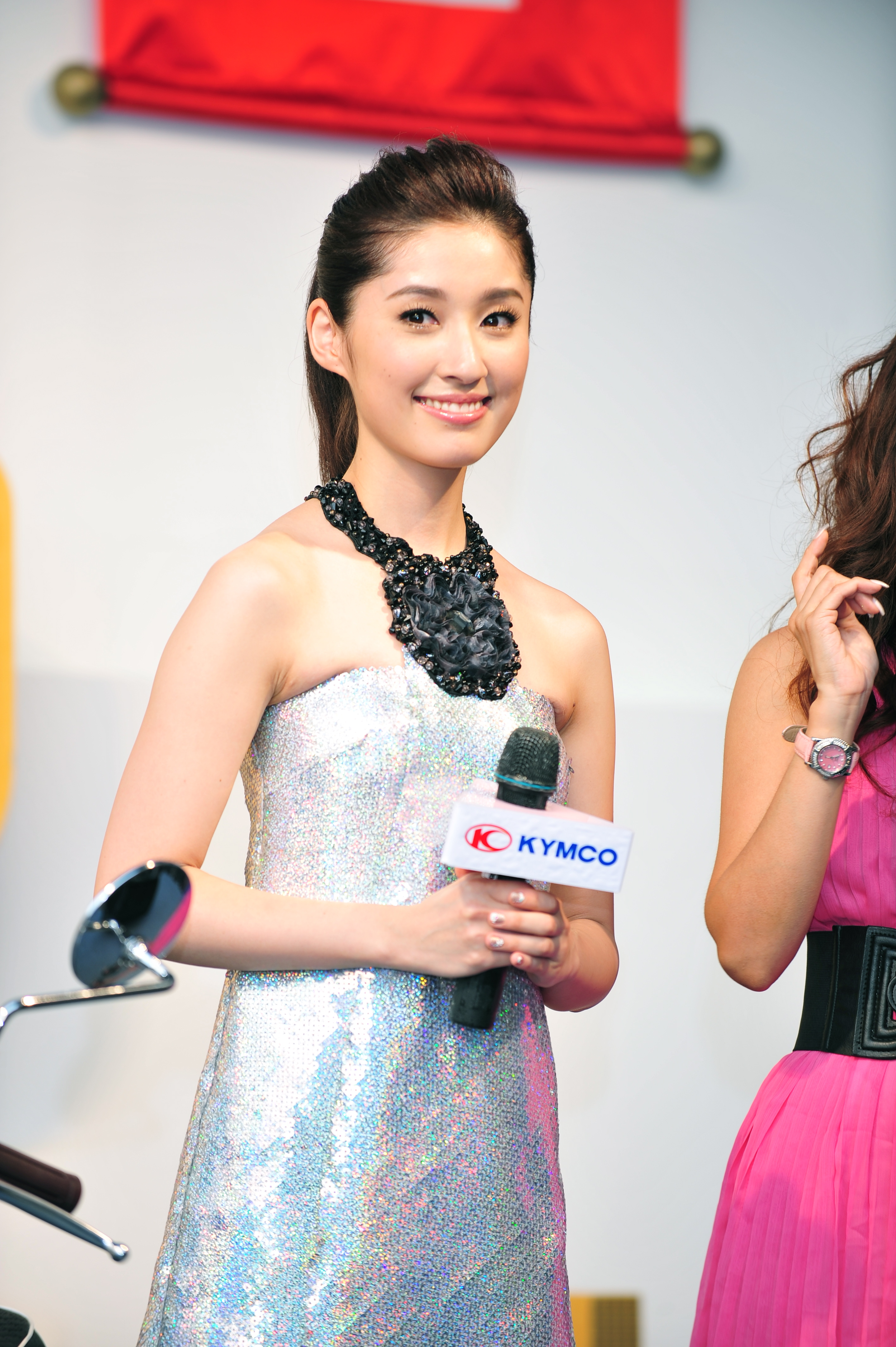
- Tanaka in 2009
- Born: August 17, 1981 (age 45); Tokyo, Japan
- Education: National Taiwan Normal University
- Occupations: Actress; model
- Years active: 1998–present

Chie Tanaka (田中 千絵, Tanaka Chie; born August 17, 1981) is a Japanese model and actress who is based in Taiwan. She is best known for her role as Tomoko in Cape No. 7, the second-highest-grossing film in Taiwanese cinematic history.

== Career ==
Born as the daughter of the wealthy Japanese cosmetics tycoon Tony Tanaka, Chie Tanaka debuted at age 17 when she appeared in the television series Bishyoujou H, although she did not garner much attention at the time. Her career in the entertainment industry was rather disappointing until she appeared in the movie Initial D, a 2005 Hong Kong movie based on the popular Japanese manga and anime series of the same name, which gained her some popularity in Taiwan and Hong Kong. Jay Chou, who played the lead role Takumi Fujiwara in the movie, later invited her to appear in his music video Common Jasmin Orange.

In June 2006, Tanaka went to Taiwan to study Mandarin at Mandarin Training Center, National Taiwan Normal University in anticipation to expand her career. Just before her scheduled return to Japan in February 2007, director Wei Te-sheng invited her to take the leading actress role Tomoko in his upcoming Cape No. 7 and subsequently prolonged her stay in Taiwan. The movie was a success, and Tanaka soon became a popular figure in Taiwan, and has concentrated her career there since.

A poll conducted by Yahoo! Taiwan in 2008 named her the third most visible person on the news, after former president Chen Shui-bien and late businessman Wang Yung-ching.

She followed up her success with the leading role in director Yu-Hsien Lin's 2009 film Sumimasen, Love as a fictionalised version of herself. In the film, Tanaka attempts to reconcile with her sense of identity after starring in Cape No.7 by travelling to sightsee in Kaohsiung, during which she finds unexpected love.

In 2010, she played a model turned singer in the idol drama Because of You, about the struggles to succeed in the entertainment industry. Since then she has also worked in Mainland China in various television series.

In 2011, Tanaka appeared in the Taiwanese epic film Warriors of the Rainbow: Seediq Bale, as Matsuno Kojima, the wife of officer Genji Kojima. The film was her second collaboration with director Wei Te-sheng.

2012 saw Tanaka playing the dual role of Asuka and Ke Ke in the Taiwanese drama The Last Night Shop, about a late night diner and the colourful patrons it attracts. It is a remake of the Japanese series Shinya Shokodo.

She appeared in the 2013 Chinese film The Chef, the Actor, the Scoundrel, as a Japanese officer and fellow alumni of the main characters from Yenching University.

In 2015, she starred in the Taiwanese horror film The Bride produced by Takashige Ichise, notable for producing other Japanese horror films such as The Ring and Ju-on franchise.

== Filmography ==
=== Film and television ===
- Tomie: Another Face (1999) as Miki
- Ping Pong (2002)
- Part-Time Detective (2002) as Kagami's mistress
- Tange Sazen: Hyakuman ryo no tsubo (2004)
- Tokusou Sentai Dekaranger (2004-2005) as Merian Teresa (guest appearance in episode 37)
- Initial D (2005) as Miya
- Spring Snow (2005)
- Cape No. 7 (2008) as Tomoko
- Su Mi Ma Sen Love (2009)
- L-O-V-E (2009)
- Love Tactics (2010)
- Warriors of the Rainbow: Seediq Bale (2011) as Kojima Matsuno
- Speed Angels (2011) as Sanoka
- Love Shock (2011)
- The Action Zero (2013)
- The Chef, the Actor, the Scoundrel (2013) as Second Lieutenant Sakura Yanagida
- The Bride (2015) as Wang Yi-Han (王依涵)
- 52Hz, I Love You (2017) as Server (cameo appearance)
- Big (2023)

=== Music video appearances ===
- 2008 - "月光" (Moonlight) - Jing's Note by Wong JingLun

== Awards and nominations ==
Nominated: Best New Performer award at the 2008 Golden Horse Awards
