= Michael Wong discography =

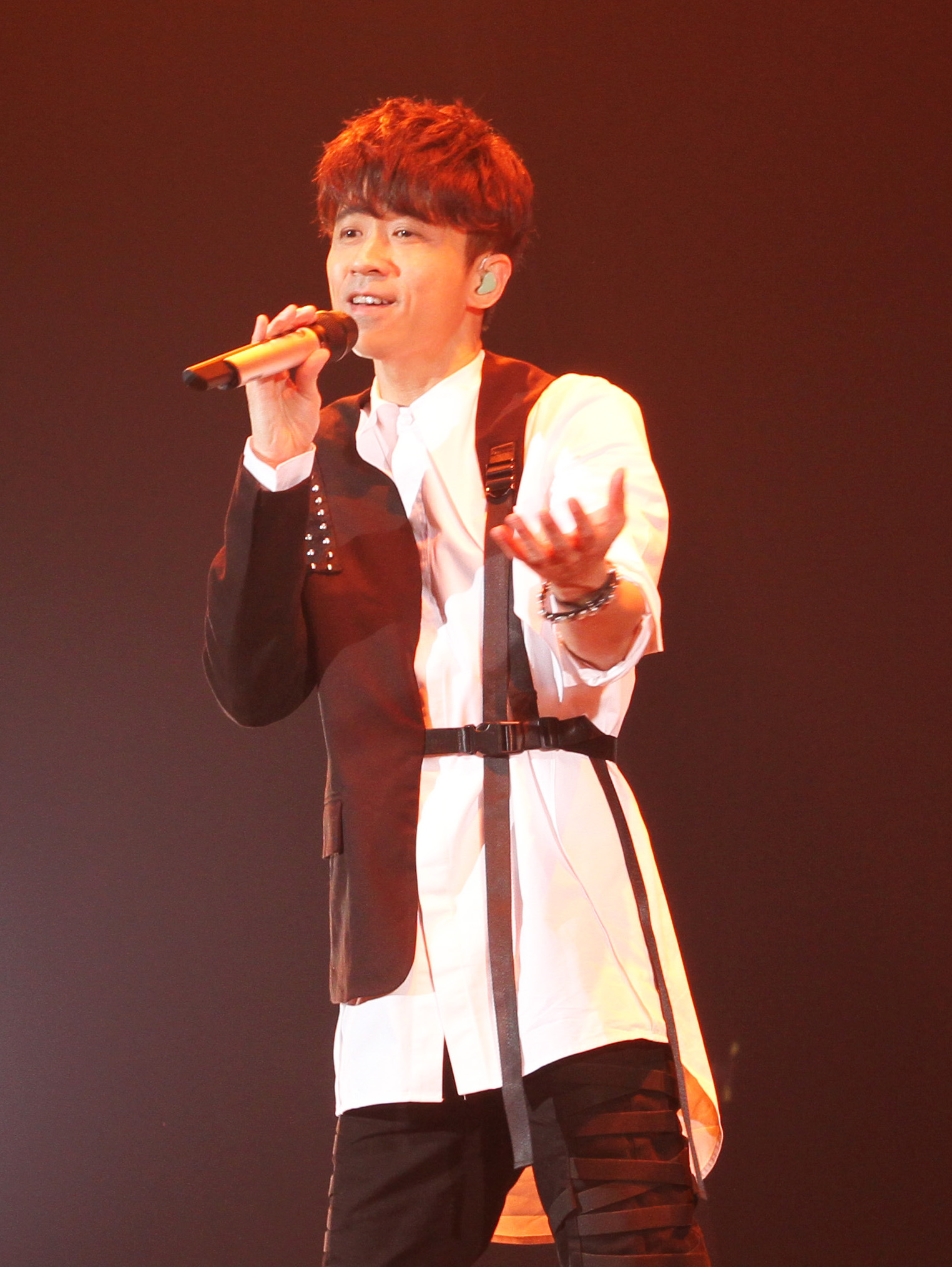
- Wong in 2018
- Studio albums: 9
- EPs: 3
- Compilation albums: 1
- Live albums: 2

The discography of Malaysian singer and songwriter Michael Wong consists of nine studio albums, three extended plays, one compilation albums, and two live albums. Wong made his debut under Rock Records in Taiwan with the studio album Michael's First Album in 2001.

Wong found widespread success with his third studio album, Fairy Tale, in January 2005. The album produced the single of the same name, which became one of the most popular Mandopop songs in the mid-2000s.

== Studio albums ==
List of studio albums, with release date, label, and sales shown
Title	Album details	Peak chart positions	Sales
Title	Album details	TWN	Sales
Michael's First Album (第一次個人創作專輯)	Released: 10 May 2001; Label: Rock Records; Formats: CD, digital download	—	
Ray of Light (光芒)	Released: 8 November 2002; Label: Rock Records; Formats: CD, digital download	—	
Fairy Tale (童話)	Released: 21 January 2005; Label: Rock Records; Formats: CD, digital download	1	Asia: 1,200,000
Commitment (約定)	Released: 3 March 2006; Label: Seed Music; Formats: CD, digital download	1	Asia: 1,000,000
Never Apart (不會分離)	Released: 9 November 2007; Label: Seed Music; Formats: CD, digital download	5	
Crazy Memories (回忆里的疯狂)	Released: 8 July 2013; Label: XYMusic; Formats: CD, digital download	—	
Nine Ways to Enjoy Loneliness (九种使用孤独的正确方式)	Released: 11 November 2017; Label: XYMusic; Formats: CD, digital download	—	
Unique (绝类)	Released: 21 March 2020; Label: XYMusic; Formats: CD, digital download	—	

== Compilation albums ==
Title	Album details
Ten Light Years (十光年)	Released: 15 September 2006; Label: Seed Music; Formats: CD, digital download

== Extended plays ==
Title	Album details
Right Side (右手边)	Released: 19 September 2008; Label: Seed Music; Formats: CD, digital download
2009 First Digital Album (2009首张数码音乐专辑)	Released: 7 August 2009; Label: Seed Music; Formats: Digital download
So Naive (太天真)	Released: 13 September 2010; Label: XYMusic; Formats: CD, digital download
The Unfinished Love (那些未完成的)	Released: 2 May 2015; Label: XYMusic; Formats: CD, digital download

== Live albums ==
Title	Album details
Rainy Sunday in Taipei	Released: 3 June 2011; Label: XYMusic; Formats: CD, DVD
Madness in Memories Tour Live	Released: 13 June 2016; Label: XYMusic; Formats: CD, 2DVD+2CD, streaming
