= 無印良品 =

無印良品 may refer to:

- Michael & Victor (Chinese: 無印良品), Malaysian Mandopop musical group
- Muji (Japanese: 無印良品), Japanese retail chain
