= Michael Wong (singer) =

Michael Wong 王光良
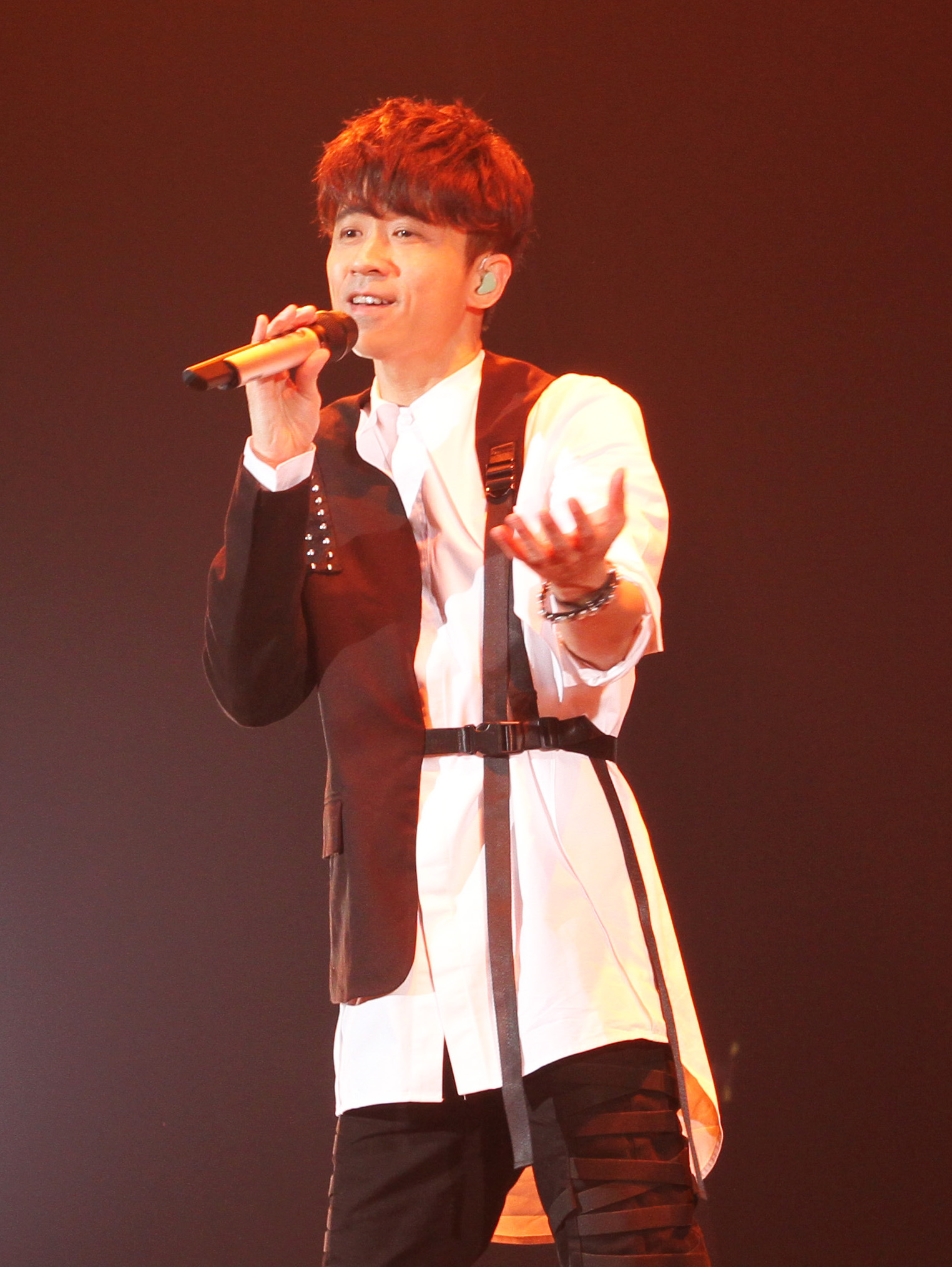
- Wong in 2018

Background information
- Also known as: Guang Liang (光良)
- Born: Ipoh, Perak, Malaysia
- Origin: Malaysia
- Genre: Mandopop
- Occupations: Singer; songwriter
- Instruments: Singing; piano
- Years active: 1995–present
- Labels: Rock Records; Seed Music; Amusic; XYmusic
- Formerly of: Michael & Victor
- Website: michael.xymusic.com

Chinese name
- Chinese: 王光良
Transcriptions
Standard Mandarin
- Hanyu Pinyin: Wáng Guāngliáng
Hakka
- Pha̍k-fa-sṳ: Vòng Kông-liòng

Michael Wong Kong Leong, also known as Guang Liang, is a Malaysian singer and songwriter. He has sung and written many love-themed ballads and love songs, many of which have high popularity. He is popularly known in the Mandopop scene as the "Prince of Love Songs" (情歌王子).

Wong began his singing career in a duo with Victor Wong. The pair had attained notable success in Taiwan, but in a mutual agreement, the two split in 2000. Wong has released five solo albums since then, the third one being his breakthrough album, Fairy Tale. He has achieved a great success in Taiwan, mainland China, Hong Kong and Malaysia where he is based. Wong has also helped several other successful singers by composing songs for them, including the ballad "Courage" (勇氣), which was originally sung by Fish Leong.

== Biography ==
Born in Ipoh, Malaysia to a Malaysian Chinese family of Hakka descent, he is the elder of two children. He has a younger sister. Wong, as a devoted Catholic, often sang in the church choir during his school days and was once a choir teacher at a church. Graduating from Sam Tet School in Ipoh, Wong often participated in musical performances in school and has been writing his own songs since secondary school. After he moved to Kuala Lumpur to pursue a course in computer engineering, his interest in the world of music and music composition began to grow.

=== Duo with Victor Wong ===
Entering from up to 30 singing competitions in town in a single year, where he managed to surface as the winner several times, were also the stepping stones to his successful singing career today. Finally noticed by Asia Pacific Music in the Pioneer karaoke contest, he started to learn Audio Engineering at Ocean Institute Of Audio Engineering during his contract with Asia Pacific Music as a recording artist. After his graduation, Michael produced his first album with two other college mates, Chan and Tan. With the joining of Victor Wong as a singer during that period, they submitted the album, with the theme song written by Michael, "掌心“ (The Palm) to Rock Records, which in turn, signed them up almost immediately. They then formed a duo group more commonly known in Malaysia as Michael & Victor or Guang Liang Pin Guan (光良品冠). In Taiwan and China, they were mostly known as Wu Yin Liang Pin (無印良品), a name given by their record label in Taiwan.

=== The split ===
The duo arguably became the first Malaysians to attain major success in the Taiwanese music scene. Their debut album went platinum in both Malaysia and Taiwan. After working as a duo for a few years together, during which the pair secured countless awards for their success, Michael and Victor decided it was time to part in 2000.

=== Solo career ===
Not long after the announcement, Wong worked hard to compose and write new songs for his new solo album, Michael's First Album (第一次個人創作專輯; Dì Yī Cì Gè Rén Chuàng Zuò Zhuān Jí), which performed above expectation. Although Wong's company promptly decided that he should produce his first solo album on his own, he did not agree straight away. This is because he was not confident that he was skilful enough to produce one whole album all by himself. However, after much contemplation, Wong finally accepted the challenge and was successful in breaking away from the Michael & Victor mould. Other than working on his own album, Wong also found time to co-produce other singers' albums like Rene Liu and Fish Leong.

Wong released his second album, Ray of Light (光芒; Guāng Máng), in November 2002. It then became the number one album, in sales, in Taiwan.

=== Fairy Tale ===
After releasing two solo albums on his own, Wong's fans had to wait another two years before he finally launched his much-anticipated album, Fairy Tale (Tong Hua). The first single from this album, "Fairy Tale", Wong wrote and composed by himself. Wong, who is more of a composer and hardly wrote lyrics, asked about 30 lyricists for suggestions for this particular song. After finally adding a finishing touch to the song with lyrics he wrote himself, he then left it to be arranged and produced by the experienced Japanese producer Taichi Nakamura. After rejecting the first few songs he short-listed himself for the album with his sense of perfection, Wong eventually re-selected some songs himself and finally rooted for his ten favourite songs to be cut into the album, of which six were co-written by himself. His two years of hard work finally paid off when this album immediately attained success; it is critically acclaimed to be Wong's best-selling album yet.

"Fairy Tale" has proven to be his most successful single yet by shooting up to No. 1 immediately after it was released in January 2005, making it to the top of the download counter Baidu 500 for 15 weeks as Asia was swept by the "Fairy Tale Tornado". The single is arguably the most successful Chinese language song of the 21st century. As of 2025 it is still among the top in the karaoke charts.

=== New contracts ===
Michael Wong's contract with Rock Records ended on 31 December 2004, but he decided to continue to promote for the album Fairy Tale, released in January 2005. After the promotion period finished, Wong has made the biggest decision in his singing career by announcing his departure from his longtime recording company, Rock Records, in July 2005. After 10 years being contracted with Rock Records, Wong is now officially signed to Amusic. The reason of his departure from Rock Records was because Rock Records believed that since his music was so simple, it was not music. Thus, they ignored him. On TV, someone had claimed that Wong's music was not music due to its simplicity, causing the singer grief. Wong's unstable relationship with Rock Records has encouraged his decision to leave for Amusic. When pressed for comments, Wong firmly and merely stated that he thanked Rock Records for giving him his big break.

=== Acting career ===
His talents and works in the music world aside, Wong is also an actor. Acting alongside Taiwanese singer Richie Ren, fellow Malaysian singer, Ah Niu and Cantonese singer/actress, Sammi Cheng, Wong made his debut on the big screen in the movie Summer Holiday in 2000. Wong has also acted in several TV drama series in Taiwan, such as White Romance (starring alongside Karena Lam), Wintry Night 2 where he speaks his native dialect Hakka, and several more. Besides that, Wong also did a stunning act in Taiwanese director Su Chaopin's debut comedy movie, BTS. Besides movies and drama series, Wong also starred in a musical stage drama in Taiwan, Mr. Wing, in August 2005.

=== Commitment ===
He has released his new fourth album, entitled 《約定》(Yue Ding / Commitment), which sold 1.5 million copies in less than one month. This is a collection of many of his past works. There would be a total of approximately 17 tracks on this album. Three self-penned new songs are featured in this new album, which are titled 《約定》("Commitment"), 《都是你》(Dou Shi Ni / "It's You") and 《擁抱我》(Yong Bao Wo / "Embrace Me"). The rest of the album will be filled with songs which he wrote for other singers like 《勇氣》[(Yong Qi / "Courage")-original singer: Fish Leong], 《我等你》[(Wo Deng Ni / "I'm Waiting For You")-original singer: Rene Liu] and 《戀》[(Lian / "Love")-original singer: Angelica Lee]. He also included the songs he wrote and sang when he was still part of the duo Michael and Victor.

Owing to the overwhelming success of "Tong Hua", some critics have expressed their concerns that "Tong Hua" might only be Wong's one-hit-wonder. His critics were proven wrong as the sales of his fourth album, Yue Ding, exceeded expectations by selling more than a million copies worldwide in a month's time. Wong's fanbase has grown tremendously and has gained much popularity globally. His success as a singer and songwriter has earned him countless awards from Hong Kong, China, Taiwan and Malaysia.

=== Further success ===
Wong's participation in A Music records label in Hong Kong has gained him more recognition in Asia. He appeared as a guest at the concert of famous Cantonese singer Leon Lai in October 2005.

On 6 June 2006, Wong made it into the Malaysia Book of Records as the Malaysian Chinese Male Composer with the highest number of awards and also for the Best Selling Chinese Album (Tong Hua). Wong has gathered 44 awards, 23 of them for his hit song "Tong Hua".

Wong has also managed to make it to the nominees' list of the 17th Golden Melody Awards, Taiwan's equivalent of the Grammys. Wong was holding up against fellow Taiwan-based Malaysian singer Penny Tai and other musical talents like Hu Defu, Chen Xiaoxia, and Yu Yang in the Best Composer Category. Although the award went to fellow Malaysian singer Penny Tai, Wong expresses that he feels very grateful and lucky to be nominated in this prestigious award ceremony.

=== Commitment: Fulfilled ===
In the past, Wong always felt puzzled and uncertain whenever his fans asked when he would stage a solo concert. Due to circumstances in the past, Wong had never held his own solo concert before and promised his fans that he would, one day, stage a solo concert. In 2006, he fulfilled this commitment to his fans.

With just half a year in the Hong Kong music scene, Wong was given the opportunity to stage his own solo concert at the Hong Kong Coliseum, the first Malaysian singer to do so. His concert tickets were sold out after only being available for purchase for 5 days. Wong thanked his fans for their utmost support of his music. Wong completed his much-anticipated first solo concert in the Hong Kong Coliseum on 29 March. His concert was entitled "Michael's First Fairy Tale Concert 2006." In September, he returned to his homeland, Malaysia, for his next concert.

His second concert, titled "Michael's Commitment Concert Malaysia 2006", was held on 1 September in the Putra Indoor Stadium in Malaysia. After about a few weeks of selling tickets, all were sold out. Due to the overwhelming response, Wong and his company decided to stage his concert there for two nights. Wong was very delighted and grateful that his fans were so supportive and stated that he hoped these two concerts would allow him to introduce his country, Malaysia, to his fans from other countries, playing the role as Tourism Malaysia's envoy. His two shows in Malaysia guaranteed a fun-filled night where fans enjoyed Wong's soothing, self-written songs.

Wong released a compilation called Michael 1996–2006 the greatest hits on 16 May 2007.

On 9 November 2007, Wong released his 5th solo studio album, Never Apart.

31 July 2009 he released his First Digital Single which contained 2 Cantonese songs called: 店小二 (Dian Xiao Er) and 清水 (Qing Shui). 右手邊 (You Shou Bian) and 美好時光 (Mei Hao Shi Guang) were also included.

In October 2010, Wong represented Malaysia and performed at the 7th Asia Song Festival, organised by Korea Foundation for International Culture Exchange, at the Seoul Olympic Stadium.

On Christmas Eve 2012, he and Teresa Carpio sang at The Joint in Hard Rock Hotel & Casino in Las Vegas as a Christmas special and sang a song that was not recorded in any of his albums.

=== Tourism ===
In 2019, Wong was appointed tourism ambassador for Perak by Tourism Malaysia.

== It's a Small World ==
In 2008, he was asked to perform the Mandarin version of "It's a Small World" at the Grand Opening of It's a Small World in Hong Kong Disneyland but after strong demand from the crowd, sang "Tong Hua" instead.

== Discography ==
=== Studio albums ===
- Michael's First Album (第一次個人創作專輯) (2001)
- Ray of Light (光芒) (2002)
- Fairy Tale (童話) (2005)
- Commitment (約定) (2006)
- Never Apart (不會分離) (2007)
- So Naive (太天真) (2010)
- Crazy Memories (回忆里的疯狂) (2013)
- Nine Ways To Enjoy Loneliness (九种使用孤独的正确方式) (2017)

== Filmography ==
=== Film ===
- The Threesome Experience: The Movie (三人行音樂電影; Sān Rén Xíng Yin Yuè Diàn Ying) – 1998
- Summer Holiday (夏日麼麼茶; Xià Rì Me Me Chá)- 2000
- BTS (愛情靈藥; Ài Qíng Líng Yào) – 2001
- Like A Slave (英勇戰士俏姑娘; Yīng Yǒng Shì Zhan Shì Qiào Gū Niáng) – 2005
- Purple Mirage(紫色梦幻;"Zǐ Sè Mèng Huàn") – 2006
- Where's the Dragon? (2015)

=== Dramas ===
- White Love (白色戀曲; Báisè Liàn Qu) – 2001
- A Change of Fate (時來運轉; Shí Lái Yùn Zhuan) – 2001
- Good Luck, Angel (王牌天使; Wáng Pái Tiān Shi) – 2003
- Love Storm (狂愛龍捲風; Kuáng Ài Lóng Juǎn Fēng) – 2003
- Wintry Night 2 (寒夜續曲; Hán Yè Xù Qu) – 2003
- Love.18 – 2008

Musical stage drama :

- Mr. Wing ~ a romantic rhapsody (幸運兒; Xìng Yùn Ér) – 2005
