= It's a Small World =

Old Mill boat ride at Disney theme parks

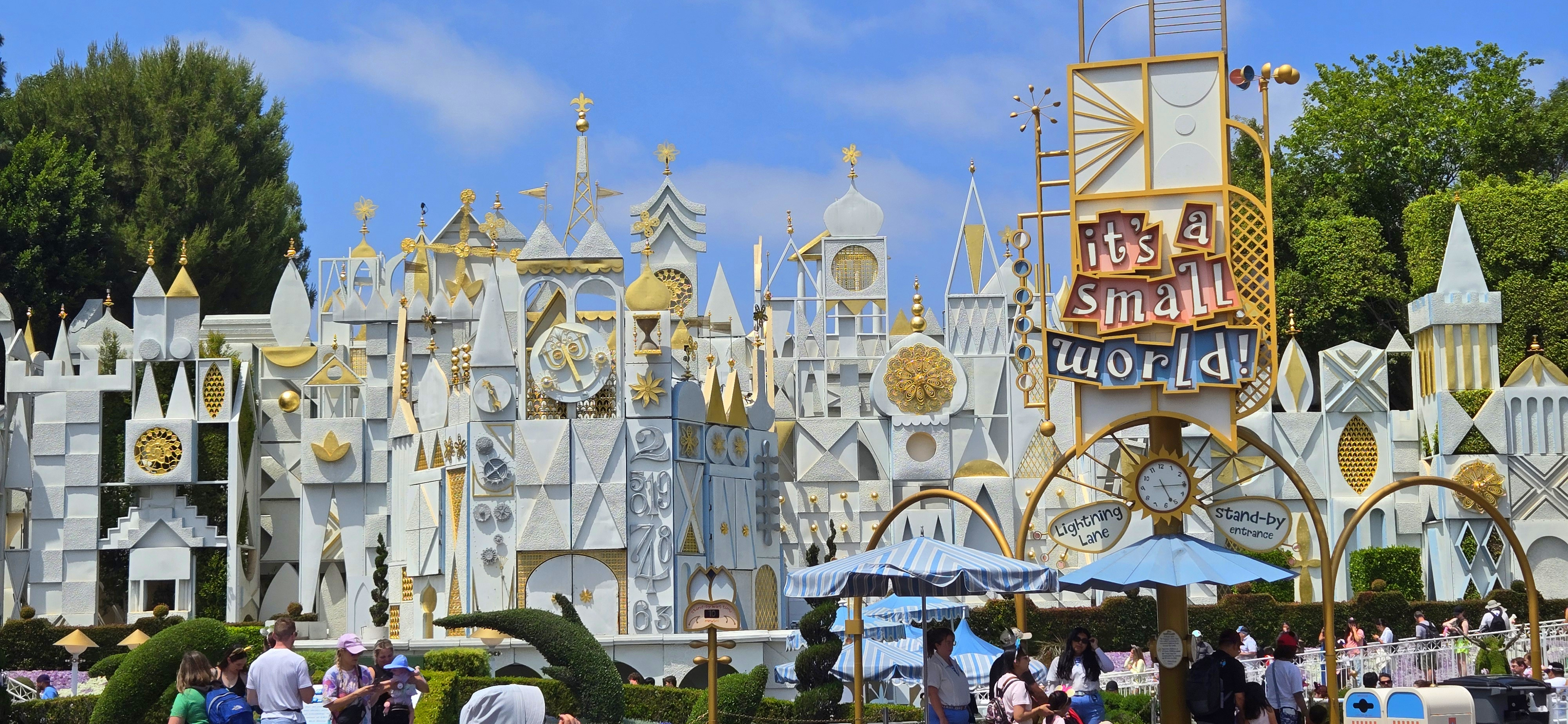
- Facade and entrance sign of It's a Small World at Disneyland in Anaheim, California, 2025

Disneyland
- Area: Fantasyland
- Coordinates: 33.8147°N 117.9178°W
- Status: Operating
- Cost: US$1.5 million
- Opening date: May 28, 1966
- Website: Official website
- Lightning Lane available

Magic Kingdom
- Area: Fantasyland (Castle Courtyard)
- Coordinates: 28.4208°N 81.5820°W
- Status: Operating
- Opening date: October 1, 1971
- Website: Official website
- Lightning Lane available

Tokyo Disneyland
- Area: Fantasyland
- Coordinates: 35.6304°N 139.8812°E
- Status: Operating
- Opening date: April 15, 1983
- Website: Official website

Disneyland Park (Paris)
- Area: Fantasyland
- Coordinates: 48.8753°N 2.7761°E
- Status: Operating
- Opening date: April 12, 1992
- Website: Official website
- Disney Premier Access available

Hong Kong Disneyland
- Area: Fantasyland
- Coordinates: 22.3137°N 114.0391°E
- Status: Operating
- Opening date: April 28, 2008
- Website: Official website
- Disney Premier Access available

1964 New York World's Fair
- Status: Closed
- Opening date: April 22, 1964
- Closing date: October 17, 1965

Ride statistics
- Attraction type: Old Mill
- Designer: WED Enterprises/Walt Disney Imagineering
- Theme: World peace and unity
- Music: "It's a Small World (After All)", written by the Sherman Brothers (music & lyrics), arranged by Bobby Hammack (1964), John Debney (1992)
- Vehicle type: Boats
- Riders per vehicle: 16
- Rows: 4
- Riders per row: 4
- Duration: 12–15 minutes
- Propulsion method: Water jets, electric turbine
- Number of lifts: 0
- Language: English, French, Japanese, Spanish, Swedish, Italian, German, Chinese, Cantonese, Korean, Filipino, Hebrew and Arabic
- Wheelchair accessible

It's a Small World (stylized in all lowercase and in quotations or with an exclamation mark) is an Old Mill boat dark ride located in the Fantasyland area at various Disney theme parks around the world. Versions of the ride are installed at Disneyland in Anaheim, California; Magic Kingdom in Bay Lake, Florida; Tokyo Disneyland; Disneyland Park (Paris) and Hong Kong Disneyland. The inaugural version of the ride premiered at the 1964 New York World's Fair before permanently moving to Disneyland in 1966.

The ride features over 300 audio-animatronic dolls in regalia from cultures around the world, frolicking in a spirit of international unity, and singing the attraction's title song, which has a theme of global peace. According to Time, the Sherman Brothers' song "It's a Small World" is the most publicly performed song of all time. In recent years, the Small World attractions at the various Disney parks have been updated to include depictions of Disney characters—in a design compatible with the original 1960s design of Mary Blair—alongside the original characters.

== Background ==
=== Ride ===
The ride was fabricated at the Walt Disney Studios in Burbank as Children of the World, and created by WED Enterprises. It was shipped to the 1964 New York World's Fair, where it was housed at the UNICEF pavilion (sponsored by Pepsi), which featured at its entrance a kinetic sculpture, The Tower of the Four Winds, a 120-foot perpetually spinning mobile created by WED designer Rolly Crump. The ride joined three other World's Fair attractions—Magic Skyway (Ford pavilion), Great Moments with Mr. Lincoln (Illinois pavilion), and The Carousel of Progress (General Electric pavilion)—that Disney was already involved with. All were intended to be dismantled and rebuilt at Disneyland after the World's Fair had closed in 1966.

Mary Blair was responsible for the attraction's whimsical design and color styling. The scenes and characters were conceived by animator Marc Davis, who also choreographed the audio-animatronic figures' dances. His wife Alice Davis designed the dolls' costumes. The costumes were heavily influenced by other countries' clothing, as Walt Disney had directed Alice Davis to "do whatever it takes to make these look like dolls every woman in the world would want to have". Crump designed the toys and other supplemental figures on display, as well as the original attraction's facade. The animated dolls were designed and sculpted by Blaine Gibson.

Arrow Development was heavily involved in the design of the passenger-carrying boats and propulsion system of the attraction. Two patents that were filed by Arrow Development staff and assigned to The Walt Disney Company illustrate passenger boats and vehicle guidance systems with features very similar to those later utilized on the Disneyland installation of the attraction. The firm is credited with manufacturing the Disneyland installation.

=== Song ===
"Children of the World" was the working title of the attraction. Its soundtrack, composed by the Sherman Brothers, was originally supposed to feature the national anthems of every country represented throughout the ride; they were all played at once, resulting in cacophony. Walt conducted a walk-through of the attraction scale model with his staff songwriters Robert B. and Richard M. Sherman, saying, "I need one song that can be easily translated into many languages and be played as a round." The Sherman brothers then wrote "It's a Small World (After All)" in July 1963 in the wake of the 1962 Cuban Missile Crisis, which influenced the song's message of peace and brotherhood. When they first presented it to Walt, they played it as a slow ballad. Walt requested something more cheerful, so they increased the tempo to 120 beats per minute and sang in counterpoint. Walt was so delighted with the final result that he renamed the attraction "It's a Small World" after the song. Recordings of the song were first sold in October 1964.

The Sherman Brothers originally wanted to donate all profits from "It's a Small World (After All)" to UNICEF, but Walt Disney dissuaded them from doing so, telling the brothers that the song would become popular. The Christian Science Monitor wrote of the song in 1967: "Visitors go away humming it as though they had made it up themselves." Robert B. Sherman's youngest son, Robert J. Sherman, has said that this song is the single most-performed and most-translated piece of music ever produced. In 2014, it was estimated that the song had played nearly 50 million times worldwide on the attractions alone, beating the radio and TV estimates for "You've Lost That Lovin' Feelin'" and "Yesterday", which were believed to have been played at least eight and seven million times, respectively. On average, the song, at 48 seconds long, is played 1,200 times during a 16-hour operating day.

A third verse celebrating the attraction's 45th anniversary was written and popularized, but not incorporated into the ride. In 2022, a 1964 recording of "It's a Small World (After All)" performed by the Disneyland Boys Choir was selected by the Library of Congress for preservation in the United States National Recording Registry as being "culturally, historically, or aesthetically significant". Shortly before his death, Richard Sherman composed a new verse to "It's a Small World". On November 27, 2024, Disney premiered it in a short film on ABC. On February 12, 2025, it was announced that the new verse would be added to the Disneyland version of the attraction starting on July 17, 2025, as part of Disneyland's 70th anniversary celebration and on July 7, 2025, it was announced that the Magic Kingdom version of the attraction would receive the new verse as well.

== World's Fair ==
1964 World's Fair "It's a Small World" ticket, logo portion

The first incarnation of It's a Small World—which debuted at the 1964 New York World's Fair at Flushing Meadows–Corona Park in Queens, New York, U.S.—was a last-minute addition. It was only publicly announced in August 1963, eight months before the fair was to open. The Ford Motor Company and General Electric had engaged Disney early on to create their pavilions for the 1964 New York World's Fair. WED Enterprises had already been at work developing a crude audio-animatronic fashioned as Abraham Lincoln when the state of Illinois approached Disney to create the Illinois Pavilion. Afterward, Pepsi approached Disney with a plan for a tribute to UNICEF, the United Nations Children's Fund. Walt Disney Productions agreed to construct, maintain, and operate a boat ride for Pepsi-Cola, which was called "It's a Small World – A Tribute to UNICEF". Pepsi also gave UNICEF $100,000 for the construction of an exhibit next to the ride, as well as $200,000 in bonds.

Disney seemed to be the showman to give us the package we want ... He's terrific. He's got his hands in more bowls than anyone I've ever seen, but he accomplishes what he sets out to do. — J. G. Mullaly, Ford's World's Fair program manager

=== Operations ===
The World's Fair opened on April 22, 1964, and UN Secretary General U Thant dedicated It's a Small World three days later, on April 25. Tickets cost 60 cents for children and 95 cents for adults, and proceeds from ticket sales were donated to UNICEF. Despite the admission fee, it was still one of the fair's most popular exhibits, with 35,000 to 40,000 daily riders on average. The attraction saw nearly five million visitors during the first year alone. A writer for The New York Times wrote that the "wondrous boat ride" was worth riding multiple times, and The Christian Science Monitor called the attraction "one of the greatest contributions to world peace ever shown anywhere". The World's Fair version of the ride was also featured in the TV show Disney Goes to the World's Fair.

The fair did not operate between October 18, 1964, and April 21, 1965. Between the fair's two seasons, the figures were refurbished at Disney's studios in Hollywood. The ride remained otherwise unchanged, although the queue line was modified to increase visitor flow. To accommodate the high ridership, the ride was operating 15 hours a day by mid-1965; the attraction had recorded 10.3 million total visitors by the end of the second year. After the fair ended on October 17, 1965, the Walt Disney Company planned to send the ride to Disneyland in Anaheim, California, U.S. Its high hourly capacity influenced future attractions; Pirates of the Caribbean had been under construction at Disneyland as a subterranean walk-through, but that design was changed to a boat ride.

=== Description ===
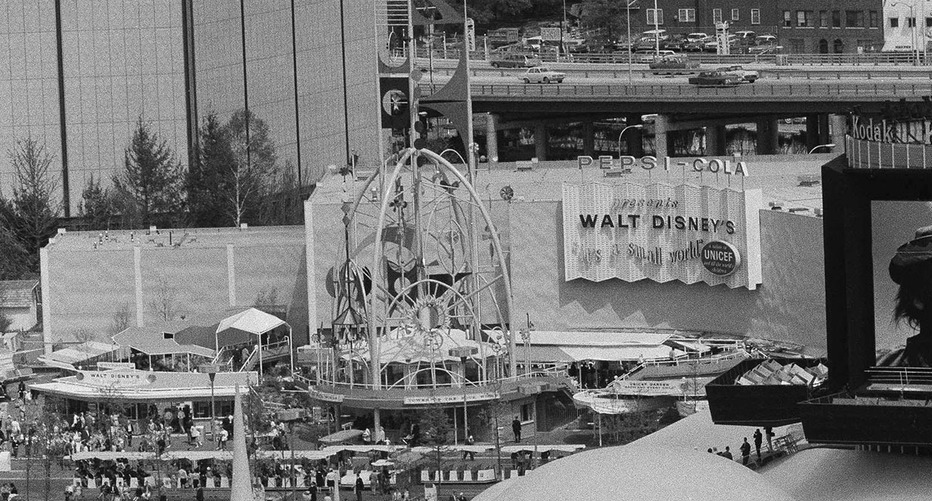
The attraction at the 1964 New York World's Fair.

The ride was located on one of the largest sites in the fairground's industrial zone. The 1965 Official Guide Book to the New York World's Fair described the ride as "a salute to the children of the world". As planned, the ride was nine minutes long and could accommodate 54,000 visitors an hour. Outside was Rolly Crump's 12-story Tower of the Four Winds, an openwork structure made of aluminum. The tower was a large sculpture measuring 120 feet (37 m) tall, with depictions of animals that blew around in the wind. Next to the ride was a store for UNICEF, and there were also UNICEF exhibits that were managed by Disneyland staff.

Entertainers dressed as the Seven Dwarfs roamed around the attraction's queue line, mingling with riders. Silent jets propelled the boats through a winding track. The boat ride depicted faraway locations where people could buy Pepsi-Cola, as well as fanciful depictions of landmarks such as the Eiffel Tower, the Windmill, the Leaning Tower of Pisa, the Parthenon and the Taj Mahal. Throughout the ride were audio-animatronic dolls of singing children from around the world, placed on both sides of the ride. There were 350 figures that sang the "It's a Small World (After All)" song in various languages. Each of the figures was intended to be in constant motion; some figures sang, while others danced or played instruments like fifes, snare drums and bass drums. Each section of the ride included figures from a different nationality, except at the end of the ride, where figures from every nationality sang side-by-side.

== Disneyland ==
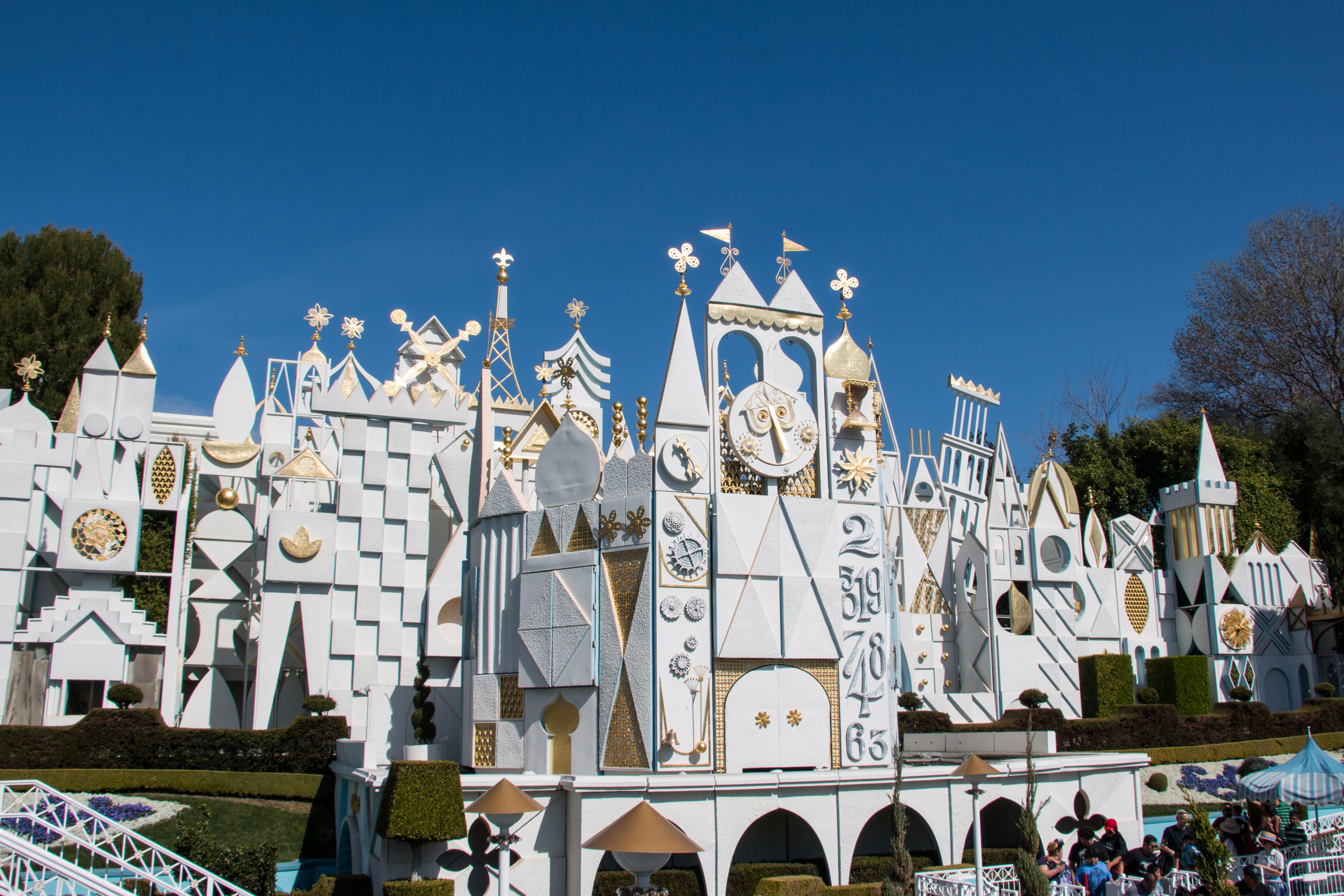
It's a Small World in Disneyland

In February 1966, Walt Disney announced that It's a Small World would be reinstalled at Disneyland as part of a $23 million expansion of the theme park. The ride was installed at the northern end of Fantasyland, opening on May 28, 1966. One critic for the Chicago Tribune said the ride "captures the essence of Walt Disney as it shows the children of the world in joyous abandon". Within a year, It's a Small World was one of the park's most popular attractions. In 2014, The Providence Journal estimated that the Disneyland installation of It's a Small World had carried 290 million riders since its opening. The ride's popularity has been attributed to its design, the 15-minute ride time, the fact that the queues typically move quickly, and its indoor location.

The ride building occupies a 1.25-acre (0.51 ha) site and is four stories high, covering 65,000 square feet (6,000 m^{2}). The facade was designed by Rolly Crump, who was inspired by Mary Blair's styling. On the attraction's primary facade, Crump designed a clock with a smiling face, located 30 feet (9.1 m) high. Every 15 minutes, costumed wooden dolls dance out from the base of the clock. When the ride opened, it was accessed by an oval pavilion surrounded by gardens and paths. There were originally 70 ride vehicles. The boats carry voyagers past representations of structures such as mosques, huts, and castles, as well as figures singing "It's a Small World (After All)" together in their native language.

=== 1966–2008 changes ===
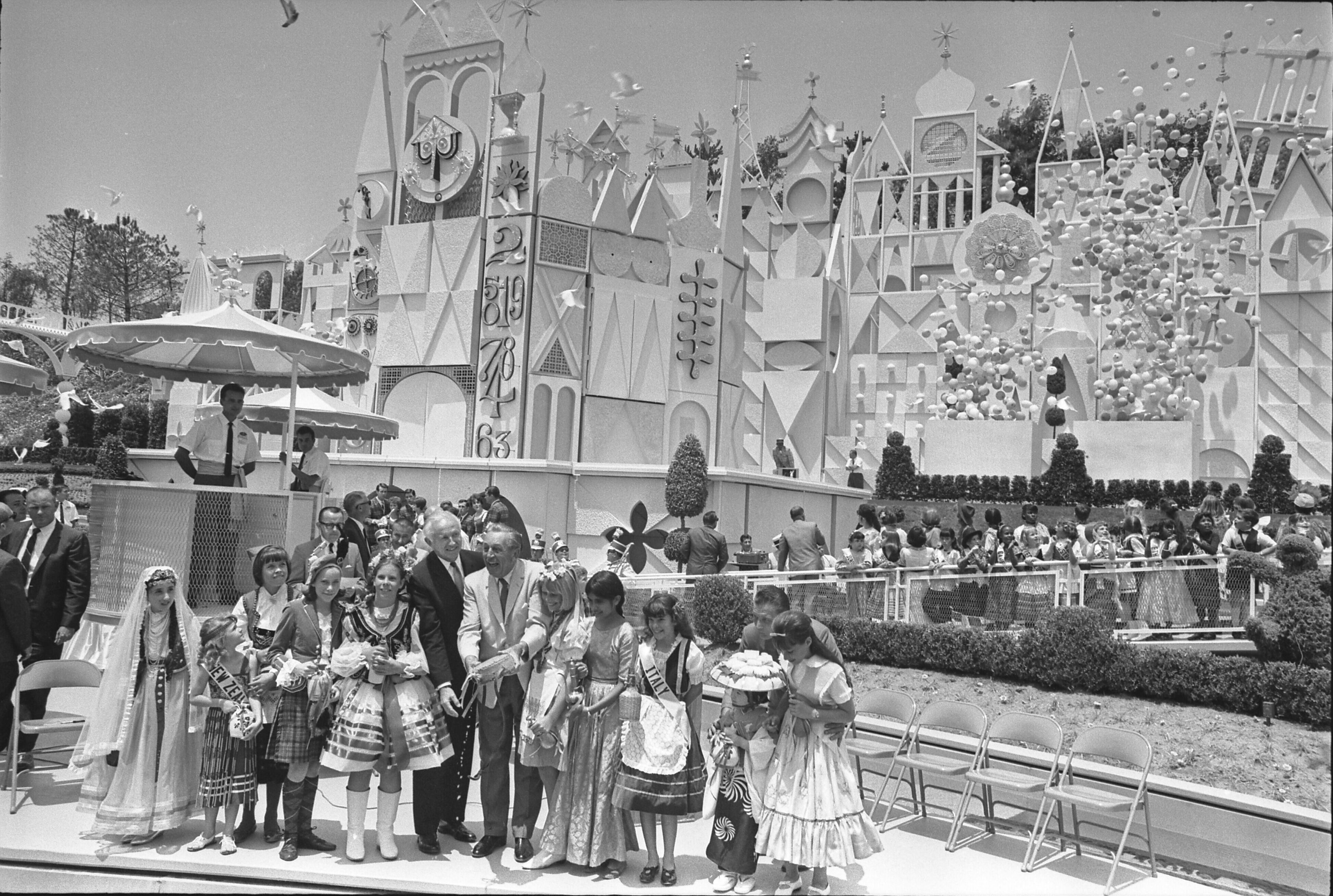
The opening day ceremony in May of 1966.

When the ride was moved to Disneyland, the Tower of the Four Winds was scrapped. In addition, representations of children from the Pacific islands and the Arctic were added to the attraction, and the number of figures was expanded to 500. The ride was originally sponsored by Bank of America. It was an E-ticket attraction, which meant that only visitors with an E ticket—the highest tier of Disneyland admission ticket at the time—could ride.

The facade was changed several times. The first major change occurred in 1977 where the clock tower had blue colors. Following the opening of another version of the ride at Disneyland Paris in 1992, the entire facade was given a pastel-colored scheme in 1993. In addition, the Bank of America canceled its sponsorship in 1992. The toy company Mattel agreed to sponsor the attraction in late 1991 and built a shop at the ride's exit the next year. The guest loading flow on and off the dock was reversed to accommodate the new gift shop's location; previously, guests entered the loading area from the western end of the dock, and exited from the eastern end. The ride was also given a modified version of John Debney's soundtrack used at Paris. Mattel dropped its sponsorship in 1999 and the store at the attractions exit no longer sold Mattel toys. In 2002, the original 1966 audio was brought back to the ride along with reverting the facade's colors to the classic white and gold scheme.

=== 2008 refurbishment and further additions ===
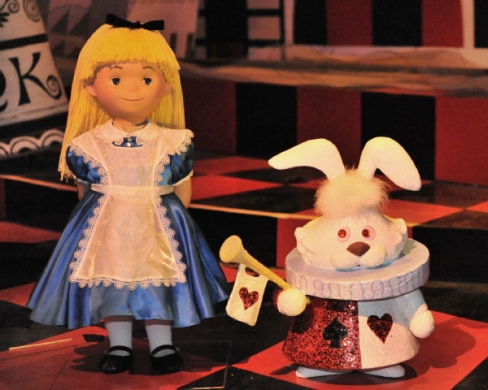
Alice and White Rabbit (from Alice in Wonderland) stand inside It's a Small World in Disneyland since 2008 refurbishment

Disneyland's "It's a Small World" was closed from January to November 2008 (closed and reopening in a holiday version, skipping the summer season) to receive a major refurbishment. The building's structure was improved, permanent attachments created for the "It's a Small World Holiday" overlay, the water flume replaced and its propulsion upgraded to electric water jet turbines, and the attraction's aging fiberglass boats redesigned in durable plastic. The refurbishment added 29 new Disney characters, each in their native land in a similar manner to the Hong Kong Disneyland version.

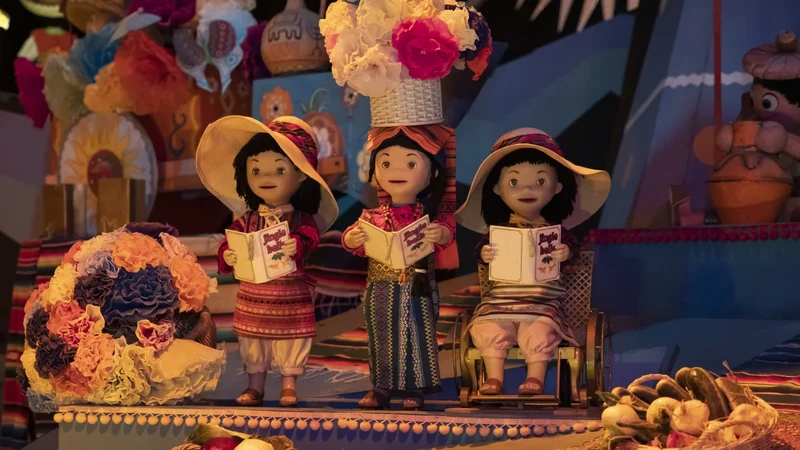
New wheelchair doll (right) in the Disneyland version of It's a Small World since 2022 holiday

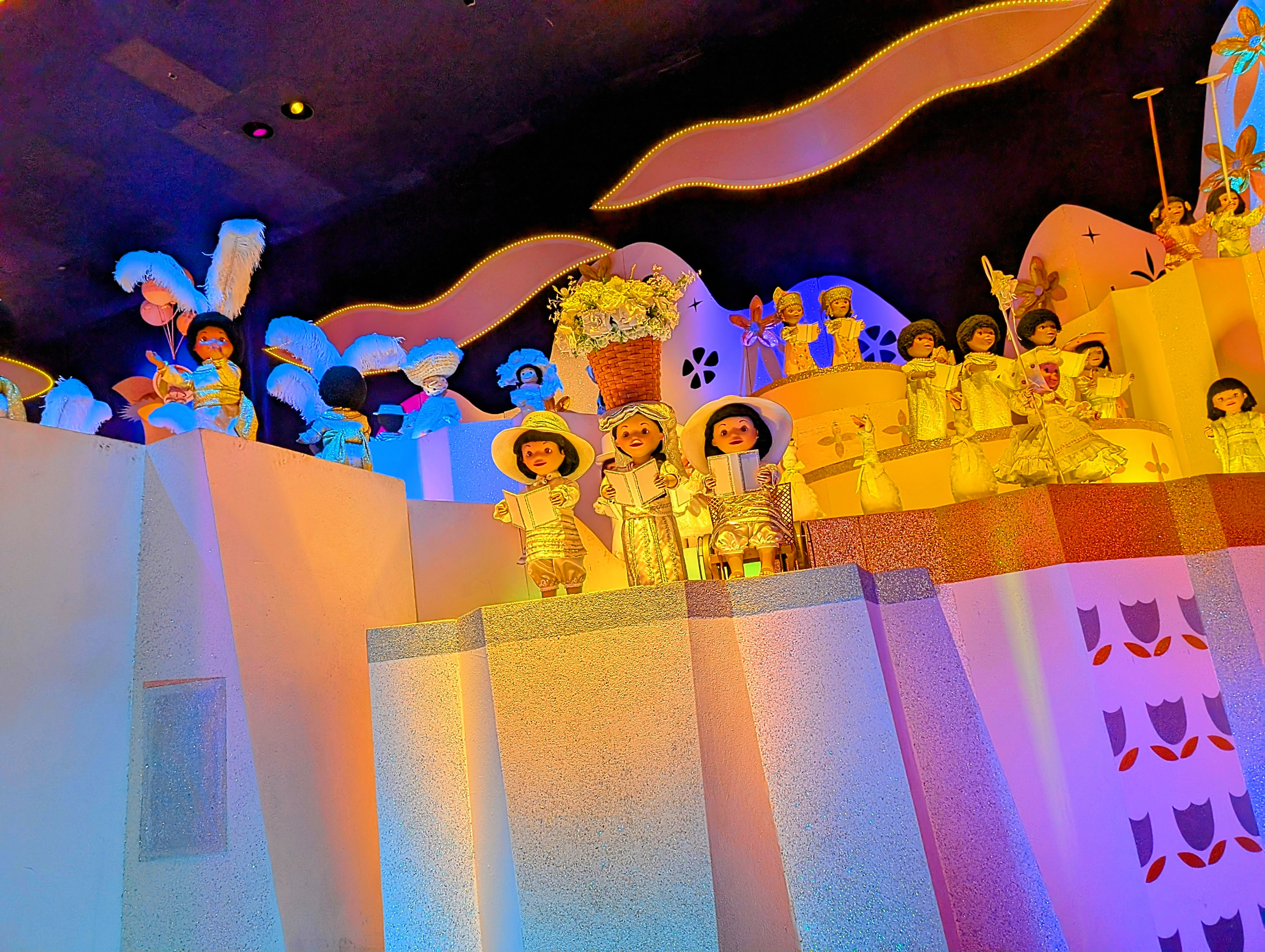
The finale of It's a Small World at Disneyland

Osram Sylvania agreed to a twelve-year sponsorship in 2009. The sponsorship was taken over by Sylvania's parent firm Siemens in 2014, and Siemens discontinued its sponsorship effective October 2017. In early 2015, the entire facade received a fresh paint job with newly refreshed karat gold accents and trims for Disneyland's 60th Anniversary. The ride got another change during It's a Small World Holiday in 2022, in which two new dolls in wheelchairs (one in the South America scene and the other in the Finale room) were added in the ride. In addition in 2025, the attraction was closed for a multi-month refurbishment after the holiday season. The facade once again received another refreshed paint-job, albeit the clock tower was given most of the touch-ups. Miguel Rivera and Dante from Pixar's 2017 film Coco were added in the South America room, while it was announced that was a new projection show, Tapestry of Happiness on May 16, 2025, as part of Disneyland's 70th anniversary celebration.In July of 2025, alongside the Magic Kingdom version of the ride debuted an unreleased third verse of the song in the finale portion of the ride.

== Magic Kingdom ==
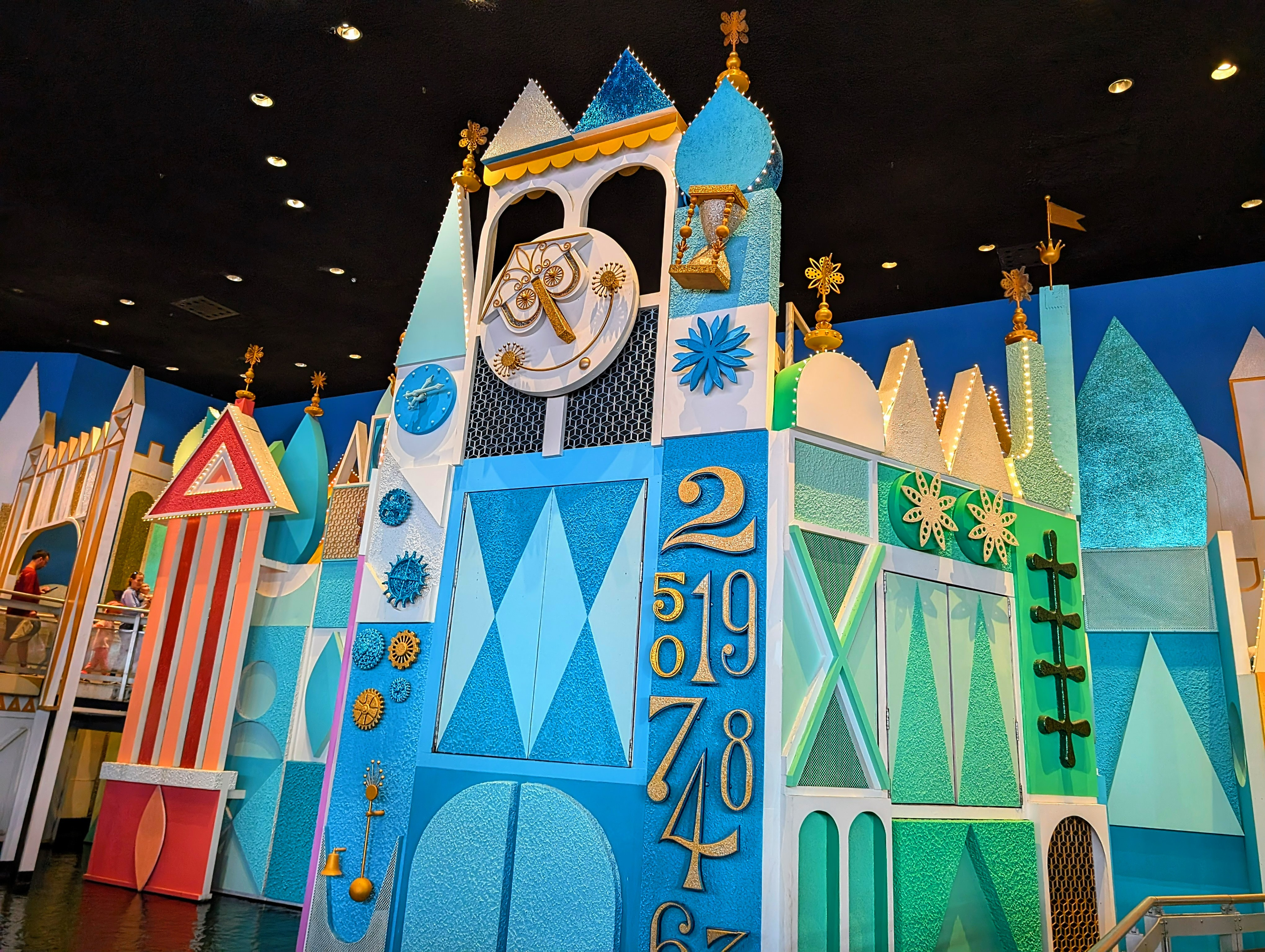
The loading area of It's a Small World at Walt Disney World

On October 1, 1971, a version of the ride opened within the Fantasyland section of Magic Kingdom at Walt Disney World in Bay Lake, Florida, U.S. It was one of Magic Kingdom's original rides. This version of the ride included over 600 figures with costumes.

The attraction lacks the elaborate facade present on the Disneyland version of the attraction, and it is also smaller in scale compared to the Disneyland ride. For three decades, the Magic Kingdom version of the attraction underwent relatively few changes. Depictions of Chinese dolls were added in the 1990s, In 1998, the English moon dolls were replaced with Welsh dolls and the moon was repainted to beige instead of green. A set of laughing African children with hyenas were removed in the 1970s.

Kodak sponsored the attraction in the early 1980s. The toy company Mattel agreed to sponsor the attraction in 1991, discontinuing its sponsorship in 1999. The ride was closed in May 2004 for refurbishment, which included a new entrance, a refurbished exterior, and a new sound system inside. After the renovation was completed, the ride reopened in 2005. In 2021, for the park's 50th anniversary, its facade was repainted in bright colors. A doll in a wheelchair was added in 2023, and further minor adjustments to the dolls took place in 2024.

In July of 2025, alongside the Disneyland Resort version of the ride debuted an unreleased third verse of the song in the finale portion of the ride.

== Tokyo Disneyland ==
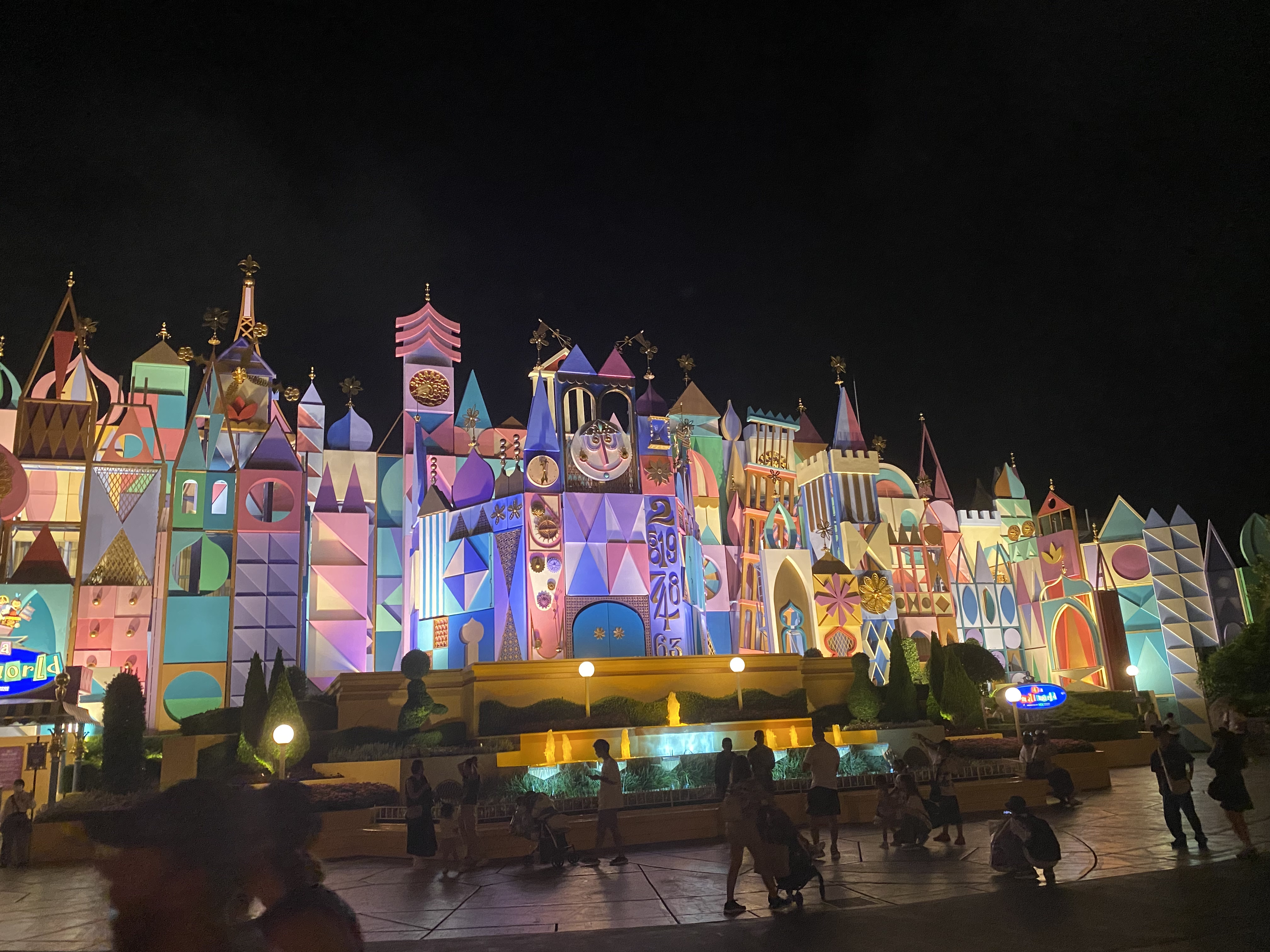
It's a Small World at Tokyo Disneyland after the 2018 refurbishment.

Another version of It's a Small World opened at Tokyo Disneyland in Chiba, Japan, on April 15, 1983. The Tokyo Disneyland version of the attraction is identical in layout to the Magic Kingdom version except for these differences:

- The facade's design is an almost-complete replica of the California counterpart under a different color scheme, resembling Disneyland's 1990s version.
- The loading area is split into two zones instead of one.
- A Welcome room was added during the 2018 refurbishment, resembling the one at the California version.
- There are scenes featuring various Disney characters redesigned in Mary Blair's style that were added during the 2018 refurbishment.
- The Asian room features radically different sets and dolls for Japan and China compared to the Magic Kingdom version. A Mandarin-language track was added to the China section in the 2018 refurbishment.
- The ride uses a different, more recent recording of the song sung in Japanese specifically created for this version instead of the original Japanese recording. The vocal track is used for both the Asian room and finale room.
- The walls of the African, South American, and Oceanian rooms are painted in colors similar to the Magic Kingdom version before its 2005 renovation.
- The Polynesian room has vocals singing in English.
- The Goodbye room resembles the one found at the California version.

=== 2018 refurbishment ===
On March 1, 2017, Tokyo Disneyland's version of "It's a Small World" closed down for refurbishment for its first major update since the park's opening in 1983. Reopened in April 2018, to coincide with Tokyo Disneyland's 35th anniversary, the attraction featured 40 characters from Disney properties including Cinderella, Alice in Wonderland, Peter Pan, The Aristocats, Brave, The Little Mermaid, Aladdin, Pinocchio, The Jungle Book, The Lion King, Hercules, The Three Caballeros, Mulan, Tangled, Lilo & Stitch, Frozen, Finding Nemo, and Moana similar to its counterparts in California and Hong Kong.

The attraction was initially set to be relocated to another area in Fantasyland with a new facade similar to the California counterpart as part of original expansion plans announced in October 2014 for the resort within the next ten years, before being revised and updated. The transformed version of the attraction soft-opened on April 15, 2018, revealing an updated color scheme for the facade, a new tick-tock sound and parade music (similar to the ones used in Hong Kong and Anaheim), an entirely reconstructed loading area dubbed "Small World Station", a new Welcome room, an extended Goodbye room, rebuilt set pieces, and music tracks new to the ride including a Mandarin-language track added to the China scene formerly exclusive to the Hong Kong version along with the aforementioned Disney characters.

=== "It's a small world with Groot" overlay ===
On March 27, 2024, Tokyo Disneyland announced that "It's a Small World" would receive a Marvel-themed overlay, called "It's a small world with Groot", closing on September 17, 2024 for installation. The park did not specify when the overlay would end, but it indicated that the ride would reopen in 2025. However, on October 29, 2025, it was announced the Marvel-themed overlay of the attraction will set to return on December 27, 2025 in Fantasyland at Tokyo Disneyland.

== Disneyland Paris ==
A fourth version of It's a Small World opened at Disneyland Paris in Marne-la-Vallée, France, on April 12, 1992. France Telecom was the original sponsor of the Disneyland Paris version of the ride.

The attraction at Disneyland Paris is a departure from other versions of the attraction. The facade features rearranged and slightly redesigned landmarks with a completely different clock tower. The exterior clock face features a wide-awake sun on its left half and a sleeping moon on its right half. Unlike all other versions of the ride, every scene is housed in one room with arches being used to define sections of the ride. The scenery design is a complete departure from Mary Blair's distinctive style, though the dolls used remain identical to all other versions. The ride also uses a completely different soundtrack composed by John Debney. This is the first version of the ride to incorporate a vibrant European room with dolls singing in French and German, a distinct Middle Eastern section with dolls singing in Arabic and Hebrew and a scene for North America with dolls representing Canada and the United States. In the Finale room, in addition to the song being sung in English, it is also sung in French. Also, the attraction had a post-show area called World Chorus that was sponsored by Orange S.A., which opened with the park in 1992 and then closed in 2010 to make way for the Princess Pavilion meet and greet area.

=== 2015 refurbishment ===
As part of an ongoing plan to refurbish several attractions for the park's 25th anniversary, this version was refurbished for six months, reopening on December 19, 2015. The refurbishment included a different color scheme for the facade that is identical to the color scheme when it first opened, restored assets and special effects, refurbished boats, new LED lighting to replace the old stage lighting, and all 176 dolls in the ride being progressively replaced through 2017. The entrance and exit rooms have been completely revamped, being identical to the entrance scene in Hong Kong Disneyland's version and the exit scene in the Magic Kingdom and Hong Kong Disneyland versions (rendered in the Mary Blair style similar to the other parks). The soundtrack has been completely remastered with the base instrumental removed from the majority of the ride's audio except for the finale, making the soundtrack more similar to the original version. Additionally, new audio tracks are added including a new recording of someone yodeling to the tune of the song in the Switzerland scene.

=== 2021–2023 refurbishment ===
Disneyland Paris's "It's a Small World" was scheduled to be closed for extensive refurbishments from November 2021 until May 2023. After an additional nineteenth-month delay and during Disneyland Paris' 30th anniversary celebration and the Walt Disney Company's 100th anniversary celebration, the ride was officially reopened on May 5, 2023 and featured three new disabled and handicapped, wheelchair-accessible dolls in three scenes: a German doll in the Germany scene, an Arabian doll in the Arabia scene and another German doll in the Finale scene.

== Hong Kong Disneyland ==
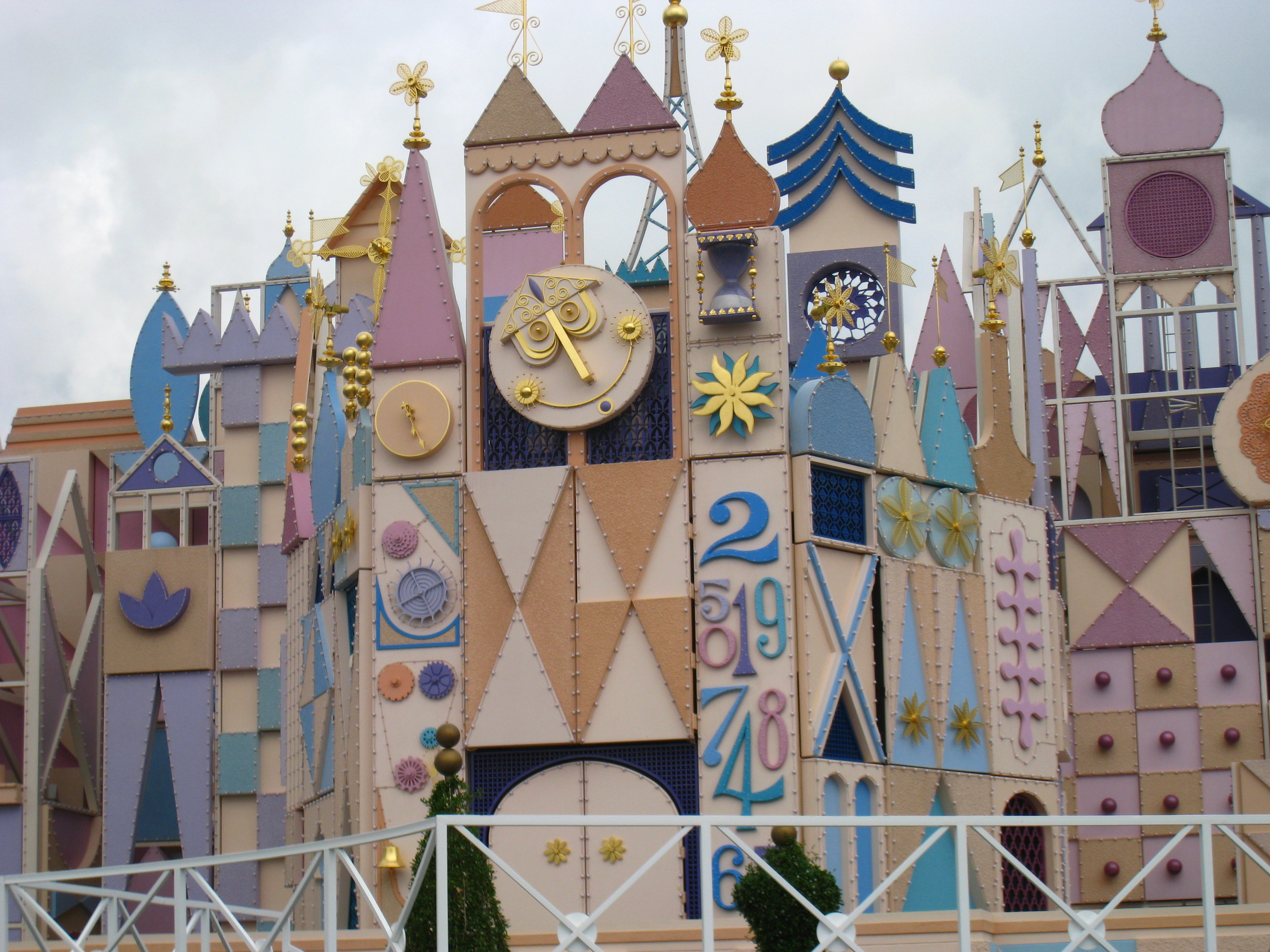
It's a Small World at Hong Kong Disneyland

The Hong Kong Disneyland version of the attraction on Lantau Island, Hong Kong, opened on April 28, 2008. It is located in the Fantasyland section of the park. Hong Kong Disneyland marketed the ride using a Cantonese version of the song "It's a Small World (After All)" by James Wong Jim. The ride is mostly modeled after the original Disneyland counterpart in that the boats travel through a canal. Some of this version's prominent and unique characteristics include:

- 38 Disney characters (all rendered in the Mary Blair style) added to scenes where their stories originated.
- An expanded Asia sequence with Hong Kong, the Philippines and Korea represented with children singing in Cantonese, Tagalog and Korean, respectively, as well as an extended China scene with represented with children singing in Mandarin
- A distinct Arabian room, and scenes for North America, similar to the Paris version
- Extraordinary fiber-optic lighting effects in the Finale room not seen on any other Disney attraction
- Cantonese, Korean, Mandarin, and Tagalog versions of the song that were specifically recorded for Hong Kong Disneyland. The finale is sung in three languages: Cantonese, English and Mandarin.
- In Spring 2024, two new dolls in wheelchairs (a Mexican doll in the South America scene and a Swedish doll in the Finale room) were added in the ride, similar to the Disneyland, Magic Kingdom and Disneyland Paris versions.

== Holiday overlay ==
It's a Small World Holiday
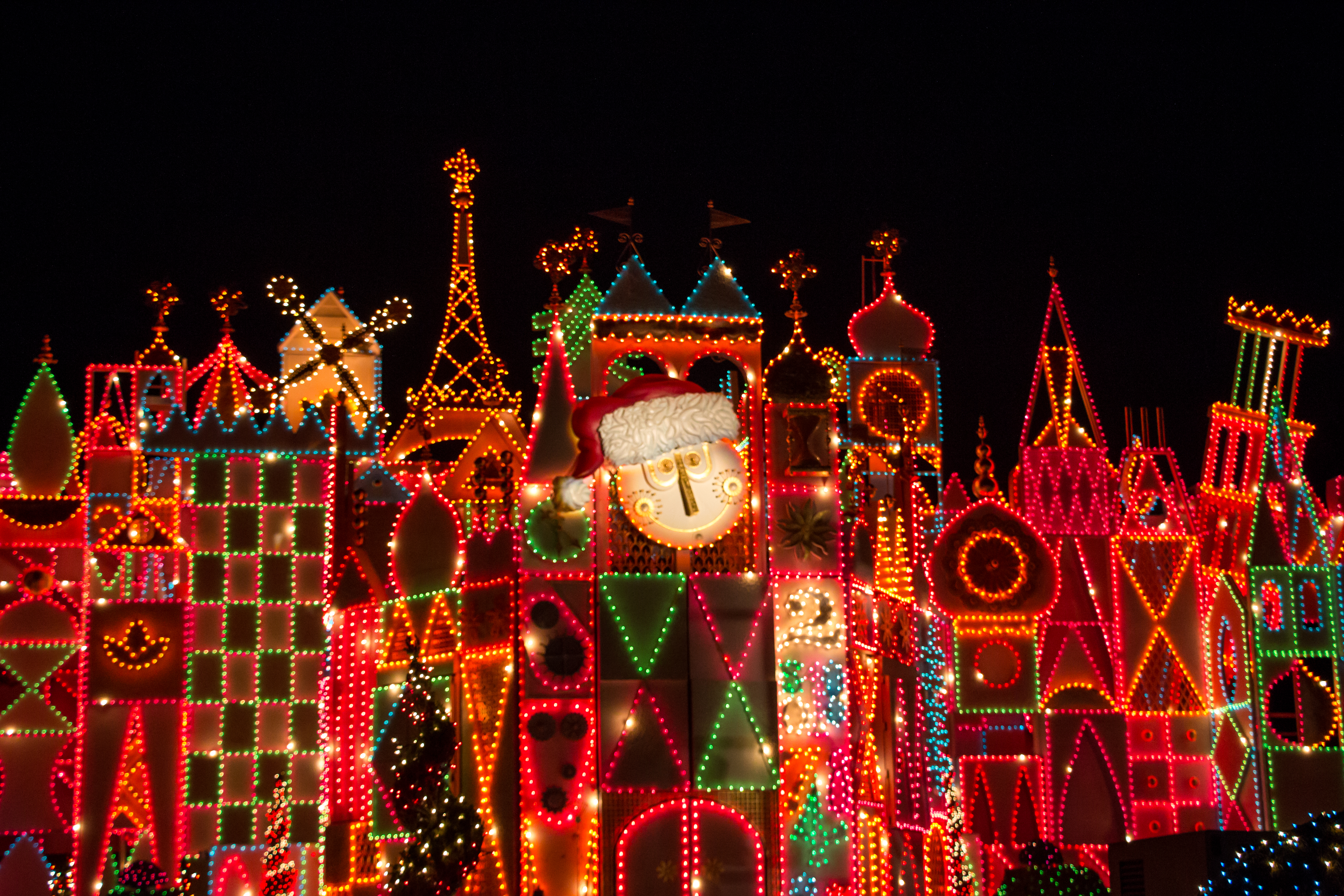
- "It's a Small World Holiday" lighting display

Disneyland
- Area: Fantasyland
- Coordinates: 33.8147°N 117.9178°W
- Status: Operating
- Opening date: November 25, 1997

Tokyo Disneyland
- Name: "It's a Small World" Very Merry Holidays
- Area: Fantasyland
- Coordinates: 35.6304°N 139.8812°E
- Status: Closed
- Opening date: 2003
- Closing date: 2015

Disneyland Park (Paris)
- Name: "It's a Small World Celebration"
- Area: Fantasyland
- Coordinates: 48.8753°N 2.7761°E
- Status: Closed
- Opening date: 1999
- Closing date: 2018

Hong Kong Disneyland
- Name: "It's a Small World" Christmas
- Area: Fantasyland
- Coordinates: 22.3137°N 114.0391°E
- Status: Closed
- Opening date: 2009
- Closing date: 2010

Ride statistics
- Attraction type: Old Mill
- Designer: WED Enterprises/Walt Disney Imagineering
- Theme: Worldwide winter holidays
- Music: "Jingle Bells" and/or "Deck The Halls" (finale only) featuring "It's a Small World (After All)", written by the Sherman Brothers, composed by Bruce Healey
- Vehicle type: Boats
- Riders per vehicle: 16
- Rows: 4
- Riders per row: 4
- Duration: 12–15 minutes
- Propulsion method: Water jets, electric turbine
- Number of lifts: 0
- Wheelchair accessible

Starting in 1997, Disneyland has featured "It's a Small World Holiday" during the end-of-the-year Christmas and holiday season. The Disneyland version of the ride has been redecorated nearly every year since then. The attraction is closed in late October to receive temporary holiday decorations inside and outside and reopens in early November before the start of the busy holiday tourist season. After the holiday season, "It's a Small World Holiday" stays open until late January where it closes to remove the holiday overlay and return to classic "It's a Small World" in early February. Almost one million lights are included during the holidays. In "It's a Small World Holiday", the main theme song is not played in full; instead, the children sing "Jingle Bells" and a bridge of "Deck the Halls" in addition to the main theme. In addition, the ride has decorations and symbols that are based on the holidays celebrated in different parts of the world. A projection show introduced in 2005 plays every 30 minutes across the facade while playing a techno version of the Nutcracker suite.

In 2003, Tokyo Disneyland introduced a version of "It's a Small World Holiday" called "It's a Small World Very Merry Holidays". Although having lights on the clock tower, the rest of the facade was covered in giant snowflakes. The inside of the attraction also had a modified soundtrack, the Asia room, and finale used Japanese vocals replacing the English dub used at Disneyland and Disneyland Paris. The 2011 season was skipped due to damaged props from the earthquake that same year. The Holiday overlay was removed in 2015 due to unknown reasons however people have speculated that Haunted Mansion Holiday Nightmare and Country Bear Jingle Bell Jamboree had higher demand along with them being too close to each other.

Disneyland Paris introduced a Holiday overlay in 1999, the first iteration of the overlay though was poorly made. The ride used an incomplete soundtrack mixed in with the ride's regular audio. The first iteration was removed in 2006. For the 2009 winter season, the overlay returned, and it received an official name of "It's a Small World Celebration". The ride received an overhaul including, new lighting, Holiday decorations throughout the inside, and the entire attraction now used the full "It's a Small World Holiday" soundtrack. The clock tower was also given a Santa hat worn until the refurbishment in 2015. Following that renovation, "It's a Small World Celebration" was planned to use an updated soundtrack originally set for winter 2016. It was delayed for unknown reasons. "It's a Small World Celebration" returned for the 2017–2018 holiday season, featuring an updated soundtrack. Since then, it has not returned.

Hong Kong Disneyland implemented its own version called "It's a Small World Christmas" that highlights the Disney character scenes in Christmas fashion with an appearance of Santa Claus in the Arctic scene. Despite being heavily decorated on the outside with clock tower dolls displayed in Holiday attire, the ride was barely decorated on the inside. The audio also was a mix between the regular, and Holiday soundtrack that would transition at points. Hong Kong's overlay lasted only one season possibly due to poor feedback.

== Nighttime Projection Shows (Disneyland) ==
=== The Magic, the Memories, and YOU! ===
The Magic, the Memories and YOU!

Magic Kingdom
- Area: Cinderella Castle
- Status: Closed
- Opening date: January 18, 2011
- Closing date: September 3, 2012
- Replaced by: Celebrate the Magic

Disneyland
- Area: It's a Small World
- Status: Closed
- Opening date: January 18, 2011
- Closing date: September 3, 2012
- Replaced by: Disneyland Forever (2015); Tapestry of Happiness (2025)

Ride statistics
- Attraction type: Multimedia and pyrotechnic show
- Designer: Walt Disney Creative Entertainment
- Theme: Iconic moments from Disney films Disney Parks Memories
- Music: "Let The Memories Begin"
- Duration: 9–10 minutes
- Wheelchair accessible

As part of Disney's "Let the Memories Begin" campaign for 2011, a nighttime projection show premiered at the Disneyland version of It's a Small World on January 27, 2011. The Magic, the Memories, and You show projected sequences of Disney attractions and characters set to Disney music onto the exterior facade of It's a Small World to fill its architectural features, personalized with exclusive photographs and videos of park guests taken that day by Disney's PhotoPass cast members. The show also existed in Walt Disney World's Magic Kingdom, but was projected onto Cinderella Castle. As the Let the Memories Begin campaign drew to a close, the show ended its run on Labor Day, September 3, 2012, at both locations. This version was replaced with Disneyland Forever as part of the Disneyland's Diamond Celebration in 2015, which included projections throughout Main Street, USA and Sleeping Beauty Castle in addition to It's a Small World.

The Magic, The Memories, and You theme song was later used for Celebrate! Tokyo Disneyland as part of the Tokyo Disney Resort 35th Anniversary celebration that premiered at Tokyo Disneyland on July 10, 2018.

=== Tapestry Of Happiness! ===
As part of Disneyland's 70th Anniversary, another nighttime show premiered. Just like The Magic, the Memories, and YOU!, Tapestry of Happiness! also projected sequences of Disney attractions, both past and present. Unlike the previous show, this show was set to the anniversary theme song "Celebrate Happy" remixed with other Disney attraction songs.

Tapestry of Happiness!

Disneyland
- Area: It's a Small World
- Status: Operating
- Soft opening date: May 14, 2025
- Opening date: May 16, 2025

Ride statistics
- Attraction type: Multimedia and pyrotechnic show
- Designer: Walt Disney Creative Entertainment
- Theme: Iconic moments from Disneyland's attractions and shows Disney Parks Memories
- Music: "Celebrate Happy" - The Jonas Brothers
- Duration: 5–10 minutes
- Wheelchair accessible

== In other media ==
- In the 1970s, a planned feature film was going to be a Cold War–tinged comedy adventure where the children of United Nations leaders try to get their parents to stop squabbling through faking mass-kidnapping, only for a war profiteer to try to take advantage of the fear and start a mass conflict.
- The attraction's song was performed in a 1979 episode of The Muppet Show guest starring Spike Milligan.
- In the 1993 episode "Selma's Choice" of animated television show The Simpsons, the song and ride that Bart, Lisa, and Selma go on is a parody of It's a Small World.
- In Disney Animation's 1994 film The Lion King, Zazu starts to sing the song, and is cut off by Scar.
- In the South Park episode "Big Gay Al's Big Gay Boat Ride", Big Gay Al, Stan and Sparky ride through a room full of homosexuals singing a parody of It's a Small World called It's Okay to Be Gay.
- In the 2005 film Kronk's New Groove, when Yzma and Kronk take a boat to their new secret lab, they ride past an Yzma version of It's a Small World.
- In the 2005 children's book Disney After Dark, the dolls from It's a Small World attack holograms of the main characters.
- An attraction titled "It's a small world" appears in Kinect: Disneyland Adventures.
- In Epic Mickey, the Gremlin Village is based on the attraction. The Clock Tower on the ride's facade is the first boss that players fight in the game.
- On November 26, 2013, Disney premiered It's a Small World: The Animated Series on Disney.com as an online-exclusive series, and the final episode was released on February 4, 2014.
- On April 22, 2014, it was announced that a feature film franchise about the ride was in the works, to be directed by Jon Turteltaub, written by Jared Stern, and produced by Turteltaub, Stern, and Dan Lin. The project was still in development in early 2016; as of 2026, no new information on the film has been released.
- In Disney's 2015 movie Tomorrowland, the 1964 New York World's Fair version of It's a Small World is seen in a flashback.
- The Disneyland version of It's a Small World made an appearance in 2013 American independent horror film Escape from Tomorrow.
- The facade of It's a Small World made a cameo appearance in the Mickey Mouse episode "O Sole Minnie".
- During the pre-show of the defunct attraction "Who Wants to Be a Millionaire? Play It!", audience members were warned not to shout out answers, and were told that, if caught, they would have to ride "It's a Small World" on a continuous loop for eight hours straight.
- A ride called "Lair Entrance: The Ride", which was a parody of It's a Small World and Splash Mountain appeared in the Phineas and Ferb episode "The Lake Nose Monster".
- In Phineas and Ferb the Movie: Across the 2nd Dimension, Dr. Heinz Doofenshmirtz is sent through a theme park-style dark ride as he rides a chair to his second dimension counterpart's office. He rides past animatronic characters and scenes that parody It's a Small World with a Dr. Doofenshmirtz theme as the dolls sing "He's Doof".
- In the Hamster & Gretel episode "The Earworm", It's a Big Big World ride is the parody of It's a Small World.
- In the Pinky, Elmyra and the Brain episode "A Walk in the Park", the ride is parodied as "The Happy, Sappy Children of Many Lands".

== Accidents ==
- On August 18, 1994, a 6-year-old girl from Miami fell out of one of the ride's boats in the Magic Kingdom version while it was in the loading area. Orange County authorities believe an incoming boat then struck her after the fall. The girl suffered a broken hip, a broken arm, and a collapsed lung. Paramedics took her to a hospital and she recovered fully from her injuries. The ride was closed for an inspection and reopened the following day.
- On October 6, 2010, a Disneyland Paris staff member died when the ride restarted unexpectedly while he was working on it. According to police, the 53-year-old man was cleaning the amusement park ride due to an earlier incident with a child guest. The unnamed man, a sub-contractor of the park, was reportedly trapped beneath a boat on the ride when it started up by accident. He was severely injured and transported by helicopter to a nearby hospital, where he later died of his injuries.
- On March 11, 2011, the ride's building in Tokyo Disneyland was violently shaking due to the affected of 2011 Tohoku earthquake and tsunami, causing some damaged props from the earthquake that leading the 2011 season of "It's a Small World Very Merry Holidays" was skipped to refurbish the ride.
- On February 28, 2015, during renovation and re-painting at the Disneyland version, a fire broke out on the left side of the facade, closest to Toontown. The fire was sparked from a firework malfunction which burnt a small portion of the facade, a tree, and a construction tarp. There were no injuries, and the main show building was untouched.
- On November 10, 2021, in the Disneyland version before holiday, a flood in the underground machinery room below the attraction's loading area damaged the ride's machinery and delayed its reopening in November. The ride was able to reopen on December 6, which stayed open until late January 2022 to compensate for the delayed reopening.

== Other incidents and controversies ==
- During It's a Small World Holiday in Disneyland on November 27, 2009, the ride broke down while a guest with quadriplegia was on the ride. The guest was stuck in the ride's "Goodbye Room", the final setting of It's a Small World Holiday, for 30–40 minutes before being evacuated. As he suffered from medical conditions that were aggravated by the "blaring Christmas carols" and was unable to exit the ride, the guest sued Disney for its inadequate evacuation procedures for disabled guests, and for not providing proper warnings for those who could not evacuate during a ride stoppage. On March 26, 2013, a jury awarded the man $8,000.
- On December 25, 2014 in the Magic Kingdom version, a 22-year-old woman lost consciousness after riding the attraction and later died. The woman had a pre-existing condition.
- On November 26, 2023 in the Disneyland version during holiday, a 26-year-old man exited a boat, removed several pieces of his clothing, walked over several props and entered the flume, resulting in a ride stoppage. The man eventually wandered to one of the outside entrances in which he was seen fully nude. The guest was arrested and removed by the Anaheim Police Department.
- On August 6, 2025 in the Disneyland version, a female guest secretly placed a dirty doll holding a protest sign reading "Remember Hiroshima" in the Japan scene of the Asia Room to mention the 80th anniversary of atomic bombings of Hiroshima and Nagasaki during World War II. The doll was later removed from the ride.

== See also ==
- List of 1964 New York World's Fair pavilions
- List of Disneyland attractions
- List of Disneyland Park (Paris) attractions
- List of Hong Kong Disneyland attractions
- List of Magic Kingdom attractions
- List of Tokyo Disneyland attractions
- Incidents at Disneyland Resort
- Incidents at Disneyland Paris
- Incidents at Walt Disney World
- Incidents at Tokyo Disney Resort
- List of Disney attractions using Audio-Animatronics
