= Tonghua (disambiguation) =

Tonghua or Tong Hua may refer to:

== Places ==
- Tonghua City
- Tonghua County
- Tonghua Province

== People ==
- Tong Hua (writer), Chinese romance novelist who writes under the pseudonym "Zhang Xiaosan"

== Other uses ==
- Tong Hua, an alternate name for Fairy Tale, an album by Michael Wong
