= Lists of incidents at Disney parks =

This incomplete list of theme park accidents in Disney Parks provides a chronological picture of theme park accidents in the theme parks Disneyland Resort, Walt Disney World Resort, Tokyo Disney Resort, Disneyland Paris, Hong Kong Disneyland Resort and Shanghai Disney Resort. They are organized by the resort areas:

- List of incidents at Disneyland Resort
- List of incidents at Walt Disney World
- List of incidents at Tokyo Disney Resort
- List of incidents at Disneyland Paris
- List of incidents at Hong Kong Disneyland Resort
- List of incidents at Shanghai Disney Resort

== See also ==
- United States amusement park accidents
