= List of incidents at Hong Kong Disneyland Resort =

This is a summary of noted incidents that have taken place at Hong Kong Disneyland Resort in Hong Kong. The term incidents refers to major accidents, injuries, deaths, and significant crimes. While these incidents are required to be reported to regulatory authorities for investigation, attraction-related incidents usually fall into one of the following categories:

- Caused by negligence on the guest's part. This can be refusal to follow specific ride safety instructions, or deliberate intent to break park rules.
- The result of a guest's known or unknown health issues.
- Negligence on the park's part, either by the ride operator or maintenance.
- Act of God or a generic accident (e.g. slipping and falling) that is not a direct result of an action on anybody's part.

== Transport ==
=== Disneyland Resort Public Transport Interchange ===
- On February 7, 2013, a taxi driver, mistaking his gas pedal for the brake pedal, struck and killed a 61-year-old taxi driver who was off-duty. Another 59-year-old taxi driver was also injured.

=== Fantasy Road ===
- On December 2, 2022, a boy was struck by a SUV at a parking lot on Fantasy Road.

=== Magic Road ===
- On March 4, 2013, a car lost control at a roundabout on Magic Road, striking a tree and killing a 44-year-old Imagineer. The driver, also an Imagineer, was charged with causing death by dangerous driving.
- On August 20, 2018, a 50-year-old employee of the park's Facility Services team was killed in a car crash while on his way to work.
- On October 26, 2023, two taxis collided at a roundabout on Magic Road, killing one of the taxi drivers.

== Hong Kong Disneyland ==
=== Main Street, U.S.A. ===
- On June 5, 2016, two guests were struck by an uprooted fiddle-leaf fig tree during a rainstorm.
- On February 13, 2017, a broken Buzz Lightyear toy was mistakenly identified as a bomb, when X-rayed at the entrance of Main Street, U.S.A.

=== Festival of the Lion King ===
- On December 28, 2023, a male performer was injured during a segment of the show in which the male performer was to spin a female performer around, whilst being attached to a rope, then releasing to allow the female performer to spin whilst the rope raises to allow the female actor to be airborne. However, the rope attached to a female performer lifted up prematurely, causing the rope to rise with both performers, as opposed to just the female performer. The weight of both performers, and the spinning momentum exerted onto the female performer caused the male performer to twist his arms with the female performer, unable to remain grip, and falling onto the stage, injuring the performer, and temporarily stopping the show.

=== Frozen Ever After ===
- On August 29, 2025, a 53-year-old Filipino man died after losing consciousness while riding Frozen Ever After at around 10 a.m. HKT. The man, who had a pre-existing health condition, was taken to a hospital where he was pronounced dead at 11:30 a.m. HKT.

== Resort hotels ==
=== Hong Kong Disneyland Hotel ===
- On January 16, 2013, a pair of siblings were playing on a park bench installed at the hotel entrance bus stop when it fell over and pinned the 3-year-old younger brother, fracturing his ribs and puncturing his lung.

== Resort-wide incidents ==
=== COVID-19 pandemic ===
- On January 26, 2020, Hong Kong Disneyland Resort was closed indefinitely due to the COVID-19 pandemic. On June 18, 2020, Hong Kong Disneyland reopened with limited guest attendance, social distancing, temperature checks, and wearing of face masks. However, it was later announced that Hong Kong Disneyland would close again on July 15, 2020 due to a heavy upsurge in domestic cases. It remained closed the following two months, reopening to guests on September 25, 2020. It reopened under strict rules that included, but were not limited to social distancing, reduced capacity, temperature screenings, and mandatory face masks. After reopening for approximately two months, the park closed for a third time on December 2, 2020 due to a rising number of coronavirus cases in the region. The park reopened for a third time on February 19, 2021. The park closed for the fourth time on January 7, 2022 due to the rising number of cases of the Omicron variant, and reopened on April 21, 2022.

== See also ==
- Amusement park accidents
- List of incidents at Disney parks
