= List of incidents at Disneyland Paris =

This is a summary of notable incidents that have taken place at Disneyland Paris in France. The term incidents refers to major accidents, injuries, deaths, and significant crimes. While these incidents are required to be reported to regulatory authorities for investigation, attraction-related incidents usually fall into one of the following categories:

- Caused by negligence on the guest’s part. This can be refusal to follow specific ride safety instructions, or deliberate intent to break park rules.
- The result of a guest's known, or unknown, health issues.
- Negligence on the park’s part, either by the ride operator or maintenance.
- Act of God or a generic accident (e.g. slipping and falling) that is not a direct result of an action on anybody's part.

== Disneyland Park ==
=== Adventureland ===
- On September 20, 2019, a 32-year-old man from Switzerland who took LSD was found nude after falling into a manmade lake in the park's Adventureland section. He and his girlfriend were arrested by the police for narcotics use and were both released the next afternoon.

=== Big Thunder Mountain ===
- On April 25, 2011, five guests were injured when a fiberglass rock on the third lift hill fell onto a passing train. One guest, a 38-year-old man, was seriously injured and transported to a Paris hospital, while the other four were treated at the scene.
- On October 27, 2011, two cars derailed as one of the ride's trains passed slowly over a flat section of track. Two guests sustained minor injuries, and the ride was subsequently closed for inspections.

=== Disneyland Railroad ===
- On January 2, 2013, at 8:45 pm, as the DRR's No. 1 locomotive approached the Frontierland station with its train, the front car uncoupled from the other four cars. When the locomotive stopped at the Frontierland station, the three rear cars struck the front car. Forty-three guests and four employees were on the train at the time of the incident. Thirty-nine guests were immediately taken care of by park agents to safely exit the train. The other four guests were taken to the hospital and later discharged with only minor injuries.

=== Indiana Jones and the Temple of Peril ===
- On August 14, 1993, eight guests suffered injuries when the ride came to a sudden halt due to a malfunction in its emergency security system. Seven were treated at a hospital while a woman remained under observation.

=== It's a Small World ===
- On October 6, 2010, a 53-year-old cast member (subcontracted to Disney) became trapped underneath a boat on It's a Small World when the ride was inadvertently switched on while being cleaned. The man was taken to a hospital where he later died.

=== Phantom Manor ===
- On April 2, 2016, the body of a 45-year-old cast member was found in Phantom Manor. He had been working on backstage lighting and his death is understood to have been due to an accidental electrocution. The ride was closed pending an investigation.

=== Pirates of the Caribbean ===
- On October 30, 2013, a five-year-old guest fell out of a boat at the end of the ride after losing his balance and becoming trapped between a platform and the boat. He was taken to a hospital, where he was in critical condition but did survive.

== Walt Disney Studios Park ==
=== Rock 'n' Roller Coaster avec Aerosmith ===
- On June 26, 2007, a 14-year-old female guest from Spain lost consciousness while riding Rock 'n' Roller Coaster avec Aerosmith and died. Although paramedics attempted to revive her, she was dead before the ambulance arrived. A ride inspection showed no mechanical problems.

=== The Twilight Zone Tower of Terror ===
- On November 23, 2011, a 12-year-old boy was stated to have been paralyzed from the neck downwards after riding The Twilight Zone Tower of Terror. X-rays indicated he had suffered a "spine and bone contusion". Hospital doctors later stated that the boy's upper limbs were already paralyzed upon arriving at the hospital and declined to link his injuries to the ride, with one telling the French newspaper Libération, "amusement parks can be not anodyne".

== Resort Hotels ==
=== Disney's Newport Bay Club ===
- On September 9, 2015, a 44-year-old construction worker fell from scaffolding during the Newport Bay Club hotel renovation after a support rail gave way. Attempts were made to revive him, but he died 40 minutes after the fall occurred.

=== Disney's Sequoia Lodge ===
- In the early hours of September 8, 1996, a fire heavily damaged portions of the Sequoia Lodge hotel and forced 1,500 guests to evacuate. Nine guests sought treatment for smoke inhalation and four of them (including two pregnant women) were hospitalized for observation.
- On January 10, 2015, a guest allegedly opened a window and shouted that she was Hayat Boumeddiene, a fugitive companion of Amedy Coulibaly, the hostage-taker and gunman in the Hypercacher Kosher Supermarket siege.

=== Grand Magic Hotel ===
- On the morning hours of September 24, 1992, 42-year-old employee Anton Kamalanesan Ponrajah was stabbed to death by an unknown assailant inside a room reserved for the hotel's personnel for counting and depositing the cash. The suspect then stole all the money inside the safe, amounting to 70,000 francs, before running out of the hotel. Ponrajah, variously described as either a cashier or security guard, was a Sri Lankan national residing in France as a political refugee. Investigators believed that Ponrajah was ambushed while in the process of locking away the money and stated that the perpetrator was most likely another staff member.

== See also ==
- Amusement park accidents
- List of incidents at Disney parks
