= List of incidents at Shanghai Disney Resort =

This is a summary of notable incidents that have taken place at Shanghai Disney Resort in China. The term incidents refers to major accidents, injuries, deaths, and significant crimes. While these incidents are required to be reported to regulatory authorities for investigation, attraction-related incidents usually fall into one of the following categories:

- Caused by negligence on the guest’s part. This can be refusal to follow specific ride safety instructions, or deliberate intent to break park rules.
- The result of a guest's known or unknown health issues.
- Negligence on the park’s part, either by the ride operator or maintenance.
- Act of God or a generic accident (e.g. slipping and falling) that is not a direct result of an action on anybody's part.

== Shanghai Disneyland ==
=== Guest altercations and other incidents ===
- On February 21, 2021, a 35-year-old guest named Guan attacked and verbally abused a stage performer. The guest was later diagnosed with acute psychosis and hospitalized.
- On April 19, 2023, a male guest who was smoking in a non-smoking area became agitated after an employee told him to stop smoking. The man angrily refused and demanded an apology from the cast member, who complied in distress. After Shanghai police officers intervened, the man collapsed to the ground, causing the cancellation of that day's parade. Shanghai Disney Resort released a statement the following day that the man was permanently banned from reentering the park.
- On September 22, 2024, a male Disney cast member dressed as Winnie The Pooh received minor injuries after he was hit in the head by a male guest. The cast member immediately fell down a block away and was later treated by employees.

=== Tron Lightcycle Power Run ===
- On October 6, 2021, a guest fainted in the attraction's queue area. He was taken to a hospital, where he later died.

=== Zootopia: Hot Pursuit ===
- On December 25, 2023, a child exited the ride vehicle mid-ride to retrieve a personal belonging and was hit, dragged, and pinned underneath.

== Resort-wide incidents ==
=== COVID-19 pandemic ===
- On January 24, 2020, the Shanghai Disney Resort (which was the first Disney Resort to close) closed for an undetermined amount of time to help prevent the further spread of coronavirus. The park refunded admission tickets as well as hotel bookings for those guests affected by the closure. The resort partially reopened on March 9, 2020 with the Shanghai Disneyland Hotel, Disneytown, and Wishing Star Park resuming limited operations with new health and safety protocols in place. Disney fully reopened Shanghai Disney Resort on May 11, 2020 with new social distancing guidelines, temperature screenings, and mandatory face masks.

== See also ==
- Amusement park accidents
- List of incidents at Disney parks
