= Baidu 500 =

The Baidu 500 (officially 百度歌曲TOP500) is a list of rankings generated by Chinese search engine Baidu as part of their mp3 downloading service featuring the top 500 songs in the Chinese language. Because it uses a download counter, the ranking is a fair assessment of the relative strength of artists and their music, and as a result has become one of the more recognized rankings in mainland China.

== Famous No. 1 Baidu 500 Songs ==
- Gangnam Style (江南Style) by Psy
- Jiangnan (江南, River South) by JJ Lin
- Tonghua (童話, Fairy Tale) by Guang Liang (holds the records for the longest time at #1, at 15 weeks)
- Qianlizhiwai (千里之外, Faraway) by Jay Chou
- Juhuatai (菊花台, Chrysanthemum Terrace) by Jay Chou
- 青花瓷 by Jay Chou
- 稻香 by Jay Chou

== See also ==
- Software industry in China
- China Software Industry Association
