= List of incidents at Tokyo Disney Resort =

This is a summary of notable incidents that have taken place at Tokyo Disney Resort in Japan, including major accidents, injuries, deaths and significant crimes. While these incidents are required to be reported to regulatory authorities for investigation, attraction-related incidents usually fall into one of the following categories:

- Negligence on the part of a guest (including refusal to follow safety instructions or deliberately breaking park rules)
- Existing guest health issues (known or unknown)
- Negligence on the part of park management, by the ride operator, or maintenance
- Act of God or generic accident that is not a direct result of action or inaction on anyone's part (e.g. slipping or falling)

== Resort-wide incidents ==
=== 2011 earthquake and tsunami ===
- On March 11, 2011, as a result of the 2011 Tōhoku earthquake and tsunami, the resort proceeded to cease operations mid-day. The resort's parking areas were flooded after the earthquake; initial reports stated that the flooding was caused by the resulting tsunami, but police later stated that liquefaction was the more direct cause. No visitors or employees were injured during the quake, but at least 20,000 of the estimated 69,000 visitors that day spent the night inside the resort's two theme parks due to the closure of Tokyo's public transportation systems. Park officials announced the closure of the resort for at least 10 days in order to conduct inspections and maintenance.

Tokyo Disneyland reopened on April 15, 2011, donating the first ¥300 of each entry fee to the Japanese Red Cross. The Disney Ambassador Hotel and Tokyo Disneyland Hotel were also scheduled to reopen April 15, with Cirque du Soleil's ZED resuming April 23, 2011. Tokyo DisneySea and its hotel, the Tokyo DisneySea Hotel Mira Costa, remained closed until further notice. It is estimated that the resort lost more than $400 million in profits during the five weeks of closure, the first extended shutdown in its history.

On April 28, 2011, just ahead of the start of the Golden Week string of public holidays, Tokyo DisneySea reopened. The date also coincided with the planned debuts of both Fantasmic! and the Mickey and Friends' Greeting Trails meet-and-greet area. Despite the Resort's full reopening, the Tokyo DisneySea 10th Anniversary celebration planned for September 2011 was postponed.

=== COVID-19 pandemic ===
- Due to the 2020 COVID-19 pandemic from the novel coronavirus that spread to Japan, the Oriental Land Company closed the resort, including Tokyo Disneyland, Tokyo DisneySea and the Ikspiari shopping complex, from February 29 to July 1, 2020. Reopening was initially scheduled for March 15, 2020 but was delayed to July 1, 2020.

== Tokyo Disneyland ==
=== Parades ===
- On January 8, 2008, a portion of a parade float collapsed during a presentation of the park's "Disney Dreams On Parade: Movin' On!" A steel pillar, weighing an estimated 300 kg (661.39 lb), fell from the Buzz Lightyear float not far from park visitors. No performers or visitors were injured, and the pillar was removed by cast members shortly afterward. The park canceled its parades for the first time in its history to complete safety checks.
- On December 13, 2022 at 3:45 PM, a 51-year-old man from Ichihara, Chiba, ran onto the parade route during a performance of the "Disney Christmas Stories" parade. The man was almost immediately restrained by cast members and was later arrested by Chiba Prefectural Police on suspicion of forcible obstruction of business. The parade was stopped for approximately six minutes as a result. No one was injured in the incident.

=== Space Mountain ===
- On June 2, 1987, Japanese idol singer Sayuri Iwai's boyfriend died of an intracerebral hemorrhage caused by a ruptured blood vessel after riding Space Mountain.
- On December 5, 2003, a roller coaster train derailed as it was returning to the station. No riders were injured, and the ride was closed pending an investigation. A January 2004 investigation completed by Oriental Land Company (the park's owner/operator) determined that an axle on the train failed because its diameter was smaller than the specifications for the part required. The attraction reopened in February 2004 after 17 park officials were reprimanded for the accident.

=== Swiss Family Treehouse ===
- In January 2008, a fire broke out in the attraction, forcing its evacuation. No guests were injured, and firefighters had extinguished the fire an hour later.

== Tokyo DisneySea ==
=== Raging Spirits ===
- At around 4pm JST on May 28, 2012, a 34 year old man suffered a minor leg injury after trying to exit the roller coaster train while it was still in motion. He became alarmed when the train started to leave the station with his seat's safety restraining bar still up. As he attempted to exit the vehicle by stepping onto the platform, his right leg was dragged approximately 2 meters (about 6 feet) along the platform, causing the injury. Police investigators believed the safety bar did not engage because an employee temporarily unlocked the car's safety bars after finding one on an empty seat that was still up. Subsequently, the bar on the man's seat also unlocked, and as he failed to press down on the bar before the train started to move, the restraint did not deploy. Raging Spirits was closed until its safety could be confirmed. It was the first case of a rider injured on an attraction at Tokyo Disney Resort.

== See also ==
- Amusement park accidents
- List of incidents at Disney parks
