= Commitment (Michael Wong album) =

約定: Commitment

Studio album by Michael Wong
- Released: March 2006
- Recorded: August–October 2005

Michael Wong chronology
Fairy Tale (2005)	約定: Commitment (2006)	Never Apart (2007)

約定: Commitment is Michael Wong's fourth solo album release. It consists of two CDs. The first disc includes new tracks and songs originally written for other singers while the second disc is compiled of piano instrumental renditions of his previously released songs.

== Disc 1 – Vocal side ==
#	Title (Mandarin)	Title (Translated English)	Title (Pin yin)
01	約定	Commitment	Yue Ding
02	都是你	It's All You	Dou Shi Ni
03	勇氣	Courage	Yong Qi
04	擁抱我	Hug Me	Yong Bao Wo
05	戀	Love	Lian
06	我等你	I'll Wait For You	Wo Deng Ni
07	都是你 (情義我心知電影主題曲版)	It's All You (Movie Version)	Dou Shi Ni

== Disc 2 – Piano side and MV ==
- 01 Computer Data
- 02 Commitment 約定 (Music Video)
- 03 It's all you 都是你 (Music Video)
- 04 Courage 勇氣 (Music Video)
- 05 Fairy Tale 童話(演奏篇)
- 06 Heaven 天堂(演奏篇)
- 07 The First Time 第一次(演奏篇)
- 08 Palm 掌心(演奏篇)
- 09 Missing You 想見你(演奏篇)
- 10 Oversensitive 多心(演奏篇)
- 11 Everytime I Call For You 每一次喊你(演奏篇)
- 12 Was It You That Changed? 是你變了嗎(演奏篇)
- 13 Sadness Subway 傷心地鐵(演奏篇)
- 14 If You Still Love Me 如果你還愛我(演奏篇)

== Cover versions ==
- Singaporean pop singer, Aliff Aziz covers Tong Hua song. The cover's title song is Cinta Arjuna.
