= List of incidents at Disneyland Resort =

A number of major accidents, injuries, deaths, and similar significant occurrences have taken place at the Disneyland Resort complex and its predecessors in Anaheim, California, United States. While most of these incidents are required to be reported to regulatory authorities for investigation, attraction-related incidents usually fall into one of the following categories:

- Wrongdoing on the guest's part. This can be refusal to follow specific safety instructions, or deliberate intent to violate park rules.
- The result of a guest's known or unknown health issues.
- Negligence on the park's part, either by the ride operator or maintenance.
- A generic accident (e.g. slipping and falling) that is not a direct result of an action by any party.

In 1985, Time magazine reported that nearly 100 lawsuits are filed against Disney each year for numerous incidents.

== Disneyland Park ==
=== Alice in Wonderland ===
- On December 21, 2000, a 15-year-old boy from Mesa, Arizona, suffered a broken leg after his left foot became stuck between a guardrail and the car in which he was riding. Police claimed that the boy might have dangled his leg outside of the car, causing the injury. The attraction reopened in less than six hours after an investigation.

=== America Sings ===
- On July 8, 1974, 18-year-old Deborah Gail Stone, a new employee who had just graduated from Santa Ana High School, was crushed to death after slipping between a revolving wall and a stationary platform inside the America Sings attraction. She was in the wrong place during a ride intermission; it was unclear whether this resulted from inadequate training or a misstep, as the ride had opened about a week earlier. The attraction was closed for two days while crews cleaned up and installed new carpeting, and installed warning lights and breakaway walls to prevent further incidents.

=== Big Thunder Mountain Railroad ===
- On March 10, 1998, a 5-year-old boy was seriously injured when his foot became wedged between the passenger cart's running board and the edge of the platform after the train temporarily paused before pulling into the unloading area. All of his left toes required amputation. Disneyland then made improvements to the ride, though the family claims that the park would not acknowledge the accident as the reason for doing so.
- On September 5, 2003, 22-year-old Marcelo Torres was killed and 10 other riders were injured after Big Thunder Mountain Railroad derailed. The fatal injuries occurred when the decorative locomotive at the front of the train became airborne and fell on top of the first passenger car, crushing the victim. The cause of the accident was determined to be improper maintenance. The derailment was the result of a mechanical failure that occurred due to omissions during a maintenance procedure. Some people blamed the new cost-conscious maintenance culture brought in by then-Disneyland president Paul Pressler and consultants McKinsey & Company in 1997, which included reliability-centered maintenance.
- On July 8, 2004, a moving coaster train collided with another train parked at the station, injuring three riders from Telluride, Colorado. A lawsuit was later filed alleging the park did not follow proper safety procedures and the ride was shut down for three weeks.

=== Costumed characters ===
- In 1976, a woman sued Disney Parks Corporation because she claimed that a cast member dressed as one of the Three Little Pigs at the "It's a Small World" attraction grabbed her and fondled her breast while shouting in distress. She claimed to have gained 50 pounds (23 kg) as a result of the incident and sued Disney for $150,000 in damages for assault and battery, false imprisonment, and humiliation. The plaintiff dropped charges after Disney's lawyers presented her with a photo of the costume, which had only inoperable stub arms, a common feature among its shorter characters that was eliminated in later years.
- In 1978, it was alleged that a cast member playing Winnie the Pooh slapped a 10-year-old girl and caused bruising, recurring headaches, and possible brain damage. The worker testified that the child was tugging at his costume from behind and that when he turned around, he accidentally struck the girl in her ear. At one point, the employee entered the courtroom after a recess wearing the Pooh costume and responded to questions while on the witness stand as Pooh would, including dancing a jig. Appearing as Pooh showed the jury that the costume's arms were too low to the ground to slap a girl of the victim's height. The jury acquitted the worker.

=== Disneyland Railroad ===
- On the night of April 4, 2004, at Tomorrowland Station, accumulated diesel fumes in the firebox of the DRR's No. 3 Fred Gurley locomotive exploded after its fire suddenly went out. The explosion ejected the engineer from the locomotive's cab and inflicted serious burns on the fireman.
- Between the night of December 28 and early morning of December 29, 2022, a fire broke out in the New Orleans Square section, damaging the freight depot. Disney characterized the fire as causing "minimal disruption and no injuries". Construction was later seen on the 'radio house' portion of the building, in which the fire had started.

=== Fantasmic! ===
- On April 22, 2023, during the 10:30 p.m. performance of the show, the Audio-Animatronic Maleficent dragon caught fire. The fire started at its head and rapidly spread across the animatronic. It became engulfed in flames, and resulted in its destruction. Cast members reported seeing a leak of hydraulic fluid dripping down from the dragon's mouth movements, moments prior to the fire. The Frontierland, and New Orleans Square area was evacuated, with no injuries being reported according to the Anaheim Fire Department. The fire had been caused by a technical malfunction. The show returned in 2024, without the dragon.

=== Haunted Mansion Holiday ===
- On October 6, 2025, a woman in her 60s was found unresponsive after riding Haunted Mansion Holiday. She was taken to a local hospital and pronounced dead later that day. An autopsy was not performed, but no problems were found with the ride.

=== Indiana Jones Adventure ===
- On June 25, 2000, a 23-year-old woman exited the Indiana Jones ride complaining of a severe headache. She was hospitalized later that day and discovered to have a brain hemorrhage. She died on September 1, 2000, of a cerebral aneurysm. Her family's subsequent wrongful death lawsuit against Disney alleged that the victim died because of "violent shaking and stresses imposed by the ride." In an interlocutory appeal, the California Supreme Court held that amusement parks are considered "common carriers" similar to commercially operated planes, trains, elevators, and ski lifts. This ruling imposes a heightened duty of care on amusement parks and requires them to provide the same degree of care and safety as do other common carriers. Disney settled the lawsuit for an undisclosed sum after the interlocutory appeal, but before a decision was rendered on the case's merits. The victim's medical costs were estimated at more than $1.3 million.

=== It's a Small World ===
- On the night of February 28, 2015, a small fire broke out in a backstage area of the park relatively close to the attraction. The flames were reported around 9:20 p.m. PST and were said to have been caused by the fireworks show. A park spokeswoman said that the flames were contained by around 9:48 p.m. PST, and no injuries were reported. The attraction reopened the following day.

==== It's a Small World Holiday ====
- On November 27, 2009, the ride broke down while a guest with quadriplegia was on the ride. The guest was stuck in the ride's "Goodbye Room", the final setting of It's a Small World Holiday, for 30–40 minutes before being evacuated. As he suffered from medical conditions that were aggravated by the "blaring Christmas carols" and was unable to exit the ride, the guest sued Disney for its inadequate evacuation procedures for disabled guests, and for not providing proper warnings for those who could not evacuate during a ride stoppage. On March 26, 2013, a jury awarded the man $8,000.
- On November 26, 2023, a 26-year-old Canadian man exited a boat, removed several pieces of his clothing, walked over several props and entered the flume, resulting in a ride stoppage. The man eventually wandered to one of the outside entrances in which he was seen fully nude. The guest was arrested and removed by the Anaheim Police Department.

=== Jungle Cruise ===
- On August 22, 2021, a 66-year-old woman broke her leg attempting to exit the Jungle Cruise ride. Her daughters filed a lawsuit against Disney claiming that workers were laughing at their mother, who was visiting the park in a wheelchair, and that she was told she could ride despite a lack of wheelchair-accessible boats. She was rushed to the Anaheim Global Medical Center where she was treated for 10 days before being transferred to a rehabilitation center, and she died on January 29, 2022, due to an infection and subsequent septic shock.

=== Main Street, U.S.A. ===
- On April 16, 1981, a woman collapsed while standing in line to purchase popcorn at the park's hub at the end of Main Street near Sleeping Beauty's Castle. She later died at Palm Harbor General Hospital.
- On September 30, 1984, a fight broke out between a 30-year-old employee from Anaheim and a picketer before the employee attempted to ram the picketer with his vehicle. He was taken into custody shortly afterward with misdemeanor charges.
- On November 20, 2023, a gust from the seasonal Santa Ana winds toppled a light pole in Town Square that provides lighting for parades and shows, injuring three park guests, one of whom was taken to a local hospital with serious injuries.

=== Matterhorn Bobsleds ===
- On July 3, 1959, a 24-year-old Disneyland machinist from Anaheim, California was seriously injured while working on the ride after a bobsled filled with passengers came down the track, knocking him off the mountain and causing him to fall 100 feet.
- In May 1964, a 15-year-old boy from Long Beach, California named Mark Maples was injured after he stood up in the Matterhorn Bobsleds and fell out. It was reported that his ride companion undid his restraint. He died three days later as a result of his injuries. This was Disneyland's first fatal incident.
- On the evening of October 30, 1971, a fire broke out in the upper level of the attraction. Three people were injured, and the ride closed for the weekend.
- On January 3, 1984, at about 3:30 p.m., a 47-year-old woman from Fremont, California was decapitated after she was thrown from a Matterhorn bobsled car and then struck by the next oncoming bobsled. An investigation found that her seat belt was not buckled. Since she was seated in the back, no one noticed her absence. It is unclear whether the victim deliberately unfastened her belt or if the seat belt had malfunctioned.

=== Mickey's Toontown ===
- On February 14, 1993, a chandelier fell in the Goofy's Bounce House attraction, injuring two children. The chandelier was removed, and the attraction was reopened shortly after.
- On May 28, 2013, two small explosions in trash cans caused the Mickey's Toontown area of the park to be evacuated. Officials believe the explosions were caused by two plastic bottles filled with dry ice (dry ice bombs) from a nearby ice cream stand, and the bomb squad was called to investigate. No injuries were reported. A 22-year-old park employee from Long Beach, California was arrested and charged with creating and detonating the two dry-ice bombs. He pleaded guilty to one misdemeanor count of possession of a destructive device. He was sentenced to 36 days in jail, three years of informal probation, 100 hours of community service, and was banned for life from all Disney parks.
- On July 6, 2019, a fight broke out among four people in Mickey's Toontown after reports that a woman from Las Vegas had spat onto a man's face. The four people and their families were escorted off the property and criminal charges were considered. The altercation was filmed on a camera phone and uploaded to YouTube. Three of the people involved, including two family members from Vegas and a man from Compton, California, later faced criminal charges.

=== Monorail ===
- On June 17, 1966, a 19-year-old man from Northridge, California, was killed while attempting to sneak into the park by climbing onto the monorail track. Ignoring a security officer's shouted warnings, he was struck by the train and dragged 30 to 40 feet down the track.
- On September 6, 1986, a 17-year-old from Anaheim suffered second-degree burns after grabbing a 600-volt wire that powers the monorail while attempting to grab his hat from a visitor who threw the hat onto the tracks.

=== New Orleans Square ===
- On June 5, 2024, a 60-year-old employee from Fullerton, California lost her balance, fell out of a moving golf cart, and hit her head on the sidewalk near the Club 33 Restaurant. She was taken to a nearby hospital in "grave condition" and was pronounced dead from her injuries two days later.

=== PeopleMover ===
- On August 21, 1967, a 15-year-old boy from Hawthorne, California was killed while jumping between two moving PeopleMover cars as the ride passed through a tunnel. He stumbled and fell onto the track, where an oncoming train of cars crushed him beneath its wheels and dragged his body a few hundred feet before it was stopped by a ride operator. The attraction had only been open for one month at the time.
- On November 3, 1968, a series of collisions between PeopleMover trains injured 25 people, with 14 people being taken to Palm Harbor General in Garden Grove.
- In 1972, four teenage girls were riding the PeopleMover when one lost her mouse-ears cap. She and her cousin jumped onto the track to retrieve it. Realizing that they now had to get on a different PeopleMover car, the first girl successfully did so, while the second ran through a tunnel and out an exit, and fell into a guardrail and onto concrete 30 feet (9 m) below. She broke her arm, hip, and pelvis, and had to be placed in a body brace and have a pin inserted into her leg. She sued Disney for not providing any warnings about the exit.
- On June 7, 1980, an 18-year-old man was crushed and killed by the PeopleMover while jumping between moving cars. The accident occurred as the ride entered the SuperSpeed tunnel and was very similar to the 1967 incident.

=== Pack Mules Through Nature's Wonderland ===
- On an unknown date before 1977, a mule's saddle broke, causing a rider to fall off and tumble down an incline, injuring him. This resulted in a jury award of $142,000 (the largest against Disneyland at that time) and the ride's permanent closure.

=== Rivers of America ===
- On June 20, 1973, an 18-year-old man from New York and his 10-year-old brother stayed on Tom Sawyer Island beyond closing time by hiding in an area off-limits to guests. When they wanted to leave the island, they tried to swim across the river but the younger boy did not know how to swim. The older boy attempted to carry his brother on his back and drowned halfway across. His body was found the next morning. The younger brother stayed afloat by dog paddling until a ride operator rescued him.
- On June 4, 1983, an 18-year-old man from Albuquerque, New Mexico drowned in the Rivers of America while trying to pilot a rubber emergency boat from Tom Sawyer's Island which he and a friend stole from a restricted area of the island during Disneyland's annual Grad Nite. Both were intoxicated. The victim's mother sued Disneyland for allowing her inebriated son onto the premises and the travel agency that arranged the trip for not properly supervising the teenagers. The lawsuits were unsuccessful.

=== Tom Sawyer Island ===
- On January 21, 2001, a 6-year-old girl lost two-thirds of her left index finger while playing with a toy rifle mounted on a turret on Fort Wilderness on Tom Sawyer's Island, which led to the removal of the toy rifles. The girl was rushed to a hospital, but doctors were unable to reattach her finger.

=== Tiana's Bayou Adventure ===
On June 21, 2026, a 13-year-old male guest exited his ride vehicle while aboard Tiana's Bayou Adventure, shortly before the attraction's final descent. Upon observing the unauthorized exit, attraction operators immediately initiated an emergency stop; however, the ride vehicle had already passed the point at which it could be safely halted before the final drop. Reports indicate the guest subsequently descended the approximately 50-foot flume outside the ride vehicle before being assisted by Disney Cast Members and emergency responders. As a precaution, the guest was transported to a local hospital for medical evaluation and was later released. The attraction remained closed for inspection by the California Division of Occupational Safety and Health before reopening the following day after being cleared for normal operation. Current information indicates that the incident resulted from the guest leaving the ride vehicle during operation rather than from a mechanical malfunction or failure of the attraction.

=== Roger Rabbit's Car Toon Spin ===
- On September 22, 2000, a 4-year-old boy fell out of the ride vehicle on Roger Rabbit's Car Toon Spin and was dragged underneath the car, causing serious internal injuries, cardiac arrest, and brain damage. Records showed that more than five minutes passed after the victim fell out of the ride vehicle before emergency personnel were contacted. On October 7, 2000, Disneyland changed its emergency policy and began instructing ride operators to call 911 first, instead of the Disney security center, to speed emergency staff to any incident on park property. A Disney spokesman claimed that the timing of the policy change and this incident were coincidental. An investigation concluded that a lap bar malfunctioned and that the victim was placed in the wrong seat in the ride vehicle, too close to the opening. Three months after the incident, the Permanent Ride Amusement branch of California's Division of Occupational Safety instructed Disney to install additional safety features on the ride. In January 2002, Disney settled with the victim's family, based on the cost of the victim's continuing medical care and suffering; Disney was not required to accept blame. The victim never fully recovered from his injuries and remained profoundly disabled until his death on January 26, 2009, aged 13.

=== Sailing Ship Columbia ===
- On December 24, 1998, a 33-year-old man was killed, and another guest and a park employee were injured, when a heavy metal cleat on the hull of the Sailing Ship Columbia tore loose. The normal tie line, an inelastic hemp rope designed to break easily, was improperly replaced for financial reasons by an elastic nylon rope that stretched and tore the cleat from the ship's wooden hull. Disney received much criticism for this incident for its alleged policy of restricting outside medical personnel in the park to avoid frightening visitors, and because the employee in charge of the ship at the time was not trained in its operation. After this incident, Disney reinstated lead foremen on most rides, and the Anaheim Police Department placed officers in the park to speed response. California's Division of Occupational Safety and Health investigated the incident and found fault with the training of the park employee who placed the docking line on the cleat. Disney was fined $12,500 by Cal/OSHA and settled a lawsuit brought by the victim's family for an estimated $25 million.

=== Skyway ===
- On April 5, 1983, a violent gust of wind knocked one of the Skyway cables out of its guide-wheel, stranding 104 people 40 feet off the ground for 2½ hours until the Anaheim Fire Department boarded them down by ladder trucks and cherry pickers. Several people received minor scratches.
- On April 17, 1994, a 30-year-old man from Highland, California fell approximately 20 feet (6 m) from a gondola into a tree in front of Alice in Wonderland. Paramedics rescued him and took him to an area hospital for treatment for minor injuries. The man filed a $25,000 lawsuit against Disney, claiming that he had simply fallen out of the ride. However, just before the trial date in September 1996, the victim admitted that he had purposely jumped out of the ride; the suit was subsequently dropped.

=== Space Mountain ===
- On August 14, 1979, a 31-year-old woman became sick after riding Space Mountain. At the unload area, she could not exit the vehicle. Although employees instructed her to remain seated while the vehicle was removed from the track, other ride operators accidentally sent her through the ride a second time. She arrived at the unloading zone semi-conscious. The victim was taken to Palm Harbor Hospital, where she remained in a coma and died one week later. The coroner's report attributed the death to natural causes; a heart tumor had dislodged and entered her brain. A subsequent lawsuit against the park was dismissed.
- In 1983, an 18-year-old man from Quartz Hill, California, fell off Space Mountain and was paralyzed from the waist down. On March 7, 1985, a jury found Disneyland blameless. During the trial, the jury was taken to the park to ride Space Mountain, and several of its cars were brought into the courtroom to demonstrate their use.
- On August 2, 2000, nine people suffered minor injuries when the ride's safety-control systems caused the train to abruptly stop. This was Space Mountain's first mechanical problem since its 1977 opening.
- In April 2013, Disney voluntarily closed Space Mountain, the Matterhorn Bobsleds, and Soarin' Over California over OSHA-related issues so employee safety protocols could be reviewed. Downtime for each attraction differed, with Space Mountain closed the longest at one month. The safety review stemmed from seven OSHA fines initiated from a November 2012 incident where a worker fell down the outside of the Space Mountain building and broke several bones. Cal/OSHA originally fined Disney a record $234,850 but the fine was reduced to $82,000 and also fined the contracting company $60,995 for safety violations.
- On January 29, 2019, a man in his 20s with cognitive disabilities used force to maneuver out of his lap-bar restraint and climbed out of the moving train in the dark during a slower portion of the ride as the coaster was making its initial climb. The man's absence was not noted until the end of the ride when his friends discovered him missing, whereupon operators stopped the ride and guided him to safety. The man was uninjured, but was later taken to the hospital for a precautionary examination. The ride reopened on February 1, 2019, after an inspection.

=== Star Tours – The Adventures Continue ===
- On March 10, 2026, an unspecified 'hazmat incident' occurred in a backstage area near Star Tours, creating an unknown odor. Five employees were sent to local hospitals after reporting dizziness and shortness of breath, and several other employees were treated by paramedics and released. A Disneyland official stated that building materials used by a contractor caused a chemical reaction backstage, but did not specify the exact reaction caused. No park guests were harmed by the incident.

=== Storybook Land Canal Boats ===
- On March 16, 2005, a 4-year-old boy broke a finger and severed the tip of his thumb when his fingers were crushed between the boat and the dock while passengers were unloading. The ride was closed for nearly two days while state authorities investigated the accident. Authorities directed Disneyland to lower and repair rubber bumpers along the dock's edge, and to make sure ride operators inform passengers to keep their hands in the boat while it docks.

=== Submarine Voyage ===
- On June 11, 1979, a woman claimed to suffer a back injury when one submarine rear-ended another. She was awarded almost $30,000.

=== Swiss Family Treehouse ===
- On the evening of October 23, 1965, a fire broke out at the Crow's Nest section of the Swiss Family Treehouse, causing a two-day closure for repairs. Officials say that the fire came from an undetermined origin.

=== Tomorrowland ===
- On March 7, 1981, an 18-year-old man was stabbed to death during a fight at a private party in Tomorrowland. The victim reportedly pinched the girlfriend of a 28-year-old man from San Diego, who subsequently stabbed him with a knife. On May 6, 1983, the attacker was convicted of second-degree murder and sentenced to 16 years in prison. The family of the victim sued the park, claiming improper medical response, and was awarded $600,000.

== Disney California Adventure ==
=== Guardians of the Galaxy – Mission: Breakout! (formerly The Twilight Zone Tower of Terror) ===
- On August 18, 2010, a 20-year-old man was hospitalized after falling 25 feet (7.6 m) from the platform of The Twilight Zone Tower of Terror. He was waiting in line to ride the attraction and climbed over a barrier before losing his balance.

=== Hyperion Theater ===
- On April 22, 2003, a 36-year-old stage technician fell 60 feet (18 m) from a catwalk in the Hyperion Theater. The victim did not regain consciousness following the incident and died on May 18, 2003. In October 2003, Cal/OSHA fined the Disneyland Resort $18,350 for safety violations related to the technician's death.
- On September 25, 2011, the flying carpet prop used during "A Whole New World" in Disney's Aladdin: A Musical Spectacular malfunctioned while flying through the theater, causing the carpet to flip over and suspend the actors playing Aladdin and Jasmine upside down. The performance was immediately stopped and the theater evacuated. No injuries or deaths were reported.

=== Incredicoaster (formerly California Screamin') ===
- On July 29, 2005, 25 guests were injured when the purple train rear-ended the red train. Of the 48 guests aboard the two trains, 15 were taken to the hospital for treatment of minor injuries.
- On July 22, 2011, firefighters rescued 23 people from California Screamin' when a backpack fell from a train and landed on the track, causing the orange coaster to stop just after the loop but before the next block brake. It reopened two days later after the coaster was winched up the next hill, had its damaged wheels replaced, and was allowed to complete the circuit.
- On May 2, 2016, a passenger using a selfie stick caused park officials to shut down and evacuate the attraction for over an hour. Selfie sticks are banned at Disney parks.

=== Pixar Pal-A-Round (formerly Mickey's Fun Wheel) ===
- On October 2, 2014, 45 riders got stuck on Mickey's Fun Wheel for 90 minutes before being rescued. No injuries were reported.

=== Guest altercations ===
- On February 18, 2012, an allegedly drunk 53-year-old man from Queen Creek, Arizona assaulted an employee at The Twilight Zone Tower of Terror's entrance gate. The employee pepper-sprayed the man multiple times, after which the man continued to fight until he was subdued by other guests. Security personnel then arrived and detained the man. The man was removed from the park and charged with assault and battery by the Anaheim Police Department. The incident was filmed via camera phone and uploaded to YouTube.

== Disneyland Hotel ==
- On September 3, 1994, a 76-year-old man from Santa Ana jumped to his death from a ninth-floor balcony of the Disneyland Hotel. This was the first suicide known to have happened at the Disneyland Resort.
- On July 6, 1996, a 23-year-old man from Anaheim either jumped or fell to his death from the 14th floor of the Disneyland Hotel. He was not a hotel guest and had climbed over several balconies.
- On May 2, 2008, a 48-year-old man from Santa Cruz, California jumped from a 14th-storey balcony of the Wonder Tower (now Frontier Tower) at the Disneyland Hotel, falling to his death in a parking lot.

== Disney's Grand Californian Hotel ==
- On April 27, 2017, a 32-year-old woman died by suicide in her hotel room at Disney's Grand Californian Hotel during a work trip.

== Resort-wide incidents ==
=== Construction accidents ===
- On August 29, 2019, a 37-year-old construction worker was fatally injured when a steel plate fell on him while working in a trench with other employees. Paramedics performed CPR, but the man later died at a nearby hospital.

=== Guest altercations and incidents ===
- On August 6, 1970, the Youth International Party ("Yippies") held a publicly promoted gathering called the "First International Pow-Wow" at the park with the intent to "liberate" Disneyland from the establishment. Anticipating a large riot, every police department in Orange County provided additional security and a special court was set up to process mass arrests. The Pow-Wow was largely peaceful, although Disneyland closed early after the Yippies replaced the American flag at Fort Wilderness with their own. As police attempted to escort the Yippies from the park, fights broke out between the Yippies and other guests, and at least 18 Yippies were arrested for violations such as trespassing, drug possession, and property damage.
- On March 13, 1993, a guest waiting in line to ride The Haunted Mansion used pepper spray on another guest who allegedly cut in line and threatened him. The spray caused approximately 80 people standing nearby to complain of eye and throat irritation. Eight people were taken to local hospitals, while the other guests were treated by the park's first aid service. No serious ailments resulted from the incident.

=== Parking areas ===
==== Parking lots ====
- On September 14, 1985, a 7-year-old girl from Torrance, California, was crushed to death beneath the wheels of a bus at Disneyland. The girl was walking across the parking lot with her uncle while looking for his car when she fell under a moving charter bus that crushed her. Paramedics pronounced her dead at the scene.
- On March 7, 1987, a 16-year-old boy was fatally shot in the Disneyland parking lot. The incident began as an early-morning confrontation between rival gang members before escalating into a brawl. An 18-year-old from Santa Ana was convicted of second-degree murder, but the conviction was subsequently overturned by a state appellate court.

==== Parking garages ====
- On October 17, 2010, a 61-year-old man from Hickman, California, jumped to his death from the Mickey & Friends parking structure's top floor. He left behind a note citing "personal issues" for his suicide.
- On April 2, 2012, a 23-year-old man from Santa Ana was found near the northwest corner of the Mickey & Friends parking structure and pronounced dead at the scene. It was investigated as a suicide at the time, but no witnesses saw the man jump.
- On November 26, 2016, a 40-year-old man from Anaheim jumped to his death from the Mickey & Friends parking structure. This was similar to the 2010 incident.
- On February 13, 2017, a vehicle fire broke out on the Mickey & Friends parking structure's second floor. Seven people were treated for smoke inhalation. Four cars were destroyed and an additional four cars received major damage.
- On December 3, 2022, a 51-year-old elementary school principal from Huntington Beach, California jumped to his death from the top floor of the Mickey & Friends parking structure. Due to this incident, elevators and escalators in the parking structure and tram services were stopped for the remainder of the night.
- On February 18, 2023, a 46-year-old woman from Scottsdale, Arizona reportedly fell or jumped from the Mickey & Friends parking structure at approximately 6:50 p.m. PST. She was taken to a local hospital where she was pronounced dead.
- On November 15, 2023, a 24-year-old man jumped to his death from the Pixar Pals parking structure.
- On April 4, 2025, a vehicle fire occurred at the Pixar Pals parking structure. Around 6 to 12 vehicles were involved, receiving varying amounts of damage.

=== Power outages ===
- On December 27, 2017, a major power outage struck Disneyland Park and temporarily closed down rides, mostly those located in Toontown and Fantasyland. Rides that lost power had to be evacuated, but no assistance from the local fire department was necessary and no injuries were reported. According to a Disneyland spokesperson, the outage was caused by an electrical transformer.

=== Public health and infectious disease outbreaks ===
- Between December 17 and 20, 2014, visitors to the park were exposed to measles, resulting in an outbreak that affected residents of eight US states, Mexico, and Canada. Secondary and unknown transmissions resulting from the outbreak resulted in at least 125 cases within the United States by February 11, 2015. The outbreak was declared over in the US in mid-April 2015. No known deaths occurred from the outbreak.

=== Other incidents ===
- On November 11, 1983, a Vietnam Marine Corps veteran from Santa Ana, California was armed with a Winchester rifle and opened fire 13 times from a hotel room across the street from Disneyland's eastern boundary during the evening hours. Officials said that only one person was injured when the victim received a cut on the nose by flying glass, and the incident caused a hundred people to be evacuated. A police standoff lasted for 10 hours, including usages of smoke grenades and tear gas. He was taken into custody after letting his dog out.

=== Foiled 1995 terrorist threat ===
On April 12, 1995, Disneyland received international media attention following a foiled terrorism plot, which sent hundreds of federal agents through the theme park and prompted a response from then-President Bill Clinton. The emergency came shortly after the Disneyland Security Division received a letter from an unidentified address and a pre-recorded videocassette from the mail; this happened one week before the Oklahoma City bombing. A few days later the attack was declared a hoax. Authorities at Los Angeles International Airport apprehended two Japanese members of Aum Shinrikyo who possessed information about making a highly toxic nerve gas with the same ingredients used in the Tokyo subway sarin attack the previous month. President Clinton in an afternoon conference two days after the Oklahoma City bombing gave brief conversation on the Disneyland threat calling it "a quick and secret development of a major U.S. effort".

The recording, which had been taped earlier that week, displayed a newspaper article from the Orange County Register that detailed a March 30, 1995, incident where a 21-year-old man from Fullerton, California was arrested after spraying a noxious substance inside Space Mountain and a gift shop, sickening 33 people. This was followed by images of a man with rubber gloves picking out containers of nerve gas chemicals wrapped in foil, storing them in a refrigerator, placing them in glass jars, and boiling them in a boiling pot. Camcorder texts reading "MADE EASY!", "NERVE GAS", and "DEAD GUEST" appeared on screen. It also included a shot of a small calendar reading "April 14" and a clock reading 9:00 PM, the scheduled time for that evening's Main Street Electrical Parade.

In 2019, a man from Portland, Oregon rediscovered one of the five copies of the Disneyland terror threat tape from a Goodwill store near Portland. The tape was uploaded to YouTube in July 2021.

== See also ==
- United States amusement park accidents
- List of incidents at Disney parks
