= Never Apart =

不會分離 Never Apart

Studio album by Michael Wong
- Released: 9 November 2007

Michael Wong chronology
Commitment (2006)	不會分離; Never Apart (2007)

不會分離 (Pinyin: Bú Huì Fēn Lí; lit. never apart) is Michael Wong's fifth solo album released on 9 November 2007. It consists of a CD and a DVD. The CD is a collection of new songs (except for Track 7 which was previously released as an online single for download). The DVD consists of the MV of Track 2 of the CD and bonus features.

== Track listing ==
1. 煙火 (yān huǒ; Fireworks) – 4:13
2. 不會分離 (bù huì fēn lí; Never Apart) – 5:53
3. I Miss You – 4:36
4. 女孩別哭 (nǚ hái bié kū; Girl, Don't Cry) – 4:20
5. 風雨同路 (fēng yǔ tóng lù; Stand Together) – 4:23
6. 愛可以點亮整個世界 (ài kě yǐ diǎn liàng zhěng gè shì jiè; Love Brightens The World) – 4:16
7. I Am Who I Am (我就是我) (wǒ jiù shì wǒ) – 3:56
8. 雙子星 (shuāng zi xīng; Gemini) – 4:05
9. 住在遙遠的星球 (zhù zài yáo yuǎn de xīng qiú; Living on a Faraway Planet) – 4:49
10. 驚嘆號 (jīng tàn hào; Exclamation Mark) – 3:46
