= Michael & Victor =

Malaysian musical duo

- Origin: Malaysia
- Genres: Mandopop
- Years active: 1995–2000
- Past members: Michael Wong; Victor Wong

Chinese name
- Traditional Chinese: 無印良品
- Simplified Chinese: 无印良品
Transcriptions
Standard Mandarin
- Hanyu Pinyin: Wúyìn Liángpǐn

Michael & Victor (simplified Chinese: 无印良品; traditional Chinese: 無印良品; pinyin: Wúyìn Liángpǐn) were a Mandopop duo composed of Michael Wong and Victor Wong. The duo split in 2000 as both singers decided to pursue individual singing careers.

== Discography ==
- Palm (掌心; Zhǎng Xīn) – August 1995
- Oversensitive (多心; Duō Xīn) – May 1996
- Palm (掌心; Zhǎng Xīn) – October 1996 (combination of 掌心, zhǎng xin and 多心, duō xin)
- Having You Beside Me (有你在身旁) – May 1997 – (Malaysian version CD of Wu Yin Liang Pin X 2)
- Wu Yin Liang Pin x 2 (無印良品 x 2; Wú Yìn Liáng Pǐn x 2) – June 1997
- Thinking Too Much (胡思亂想; Hú Si Luàn Xiǎng (精選)) (Hong Kong) – August 1997
- The Three of Us (3 人行, Sān Rén Xíng) (Taiwan/Malaysia) – January 1998
- Wanna See You (想見你, Xiǎng Jiàn Ni) (Taiwan) – February 1999
- Take Care Michael & Victor – 95–99 – Farewell Compilation (珍重無印良品 – 95–99 分手紀念精選集; Zhēn Chóng Wú Yìn Liáng Pǐn – 95- 99 Fēn Shǒu Jì Niàn Jīng Xuǎn Jí) (Taiwan) – December 1999
- 10 Golden Years in Hong Kong Rock Records – Michael & Victor (【 滾石香港黃金十年 】光良品冠精選; [Wen Shí Xiāng Gǎng Huang Jin Shí Nián] Guāng Liáng Pǐn Guān Jing Xuǎn) (Hong Kong) – (March 2003)
- Take Care Michael & Victor Farewell Concert (Live Recording) (珍重無印良品再見演唱會 Live 全紀錄; Zhēn Chóng Wú Yìn Liáng Pǐn Zài Jiàn Yǎn Chàng Huì Live Quán Jì Lù) (Taiwan) – June 2000
