= Victor Wong (singer) =

Malaysian Chinese singer (born 1972)

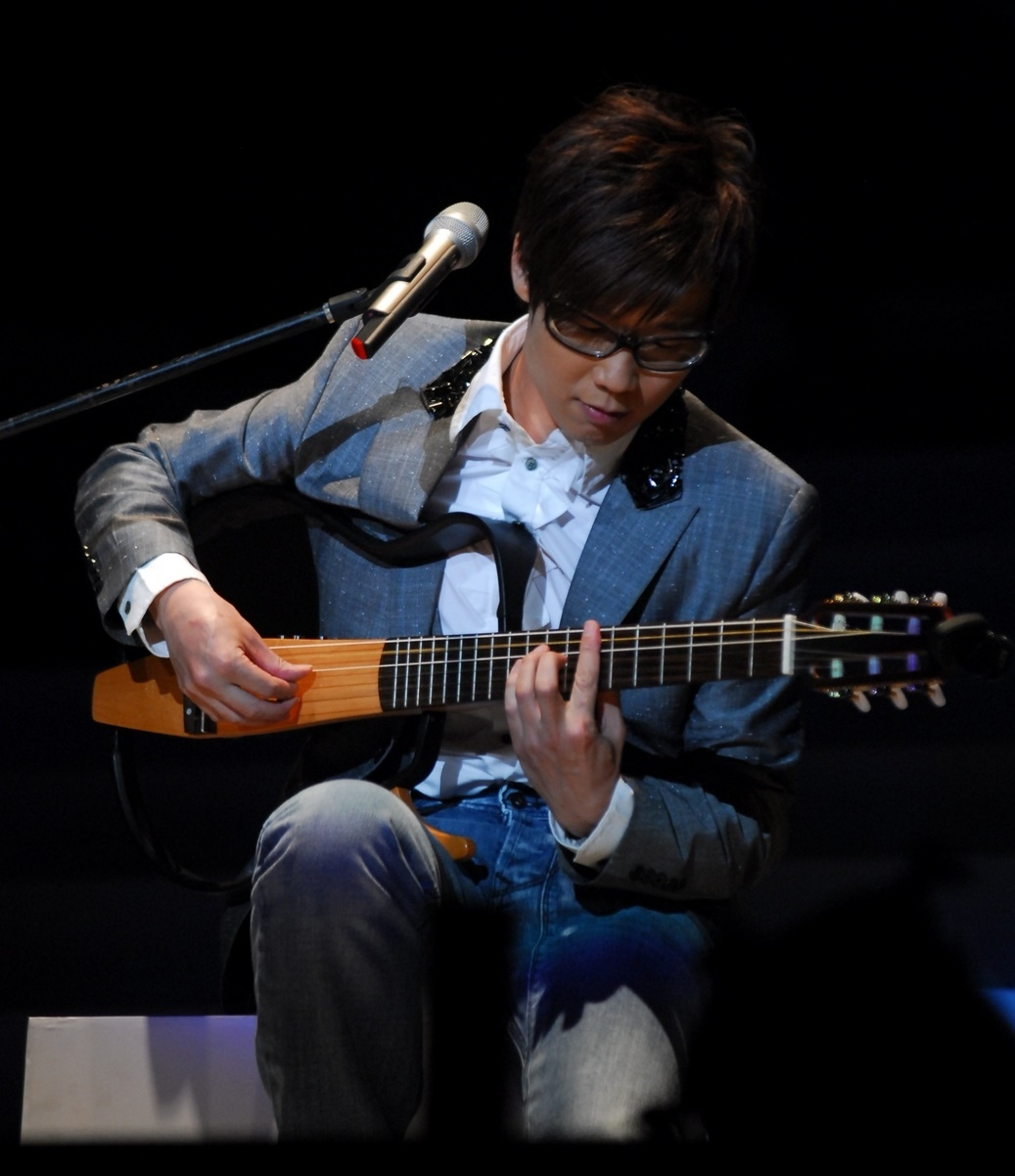
- Wong in 2009

Background information
- Also known as: Pin Guan (Chinese: 品冠)
- Born: 26 February 1972 (age 54); Kuala Lumpur, Malaysia
- Origin: Malaysia
- Genres: Mandopop
- Occupation: Singer
- Years active: 1995–present
- Formerly of: Michael & Victor

Chinese name
- Traditional Chinese: 黃品冠
- Simplified Chinese: 黄品冠
Transcriptions
Standard Mandarin
- Hanyu Pinyin: Huáng Pǐnguàn
Hakka
- Pha̍k-fa-sṳ: Vòng Phín-kwon
Yue: Cantonese
- Jyutping: Wong4 Ban2 Gun1
Southern Min
- Hokkien POJ: N̂g Phín-koan

Victor Wong Pin Kuan (Chinese: 黃品冠; Jyutping: Wong4 Ban2 Gun1; Pha̍k-fa-sṳ: Vòng Phín-kwon) is a Malaysian Chinese singer who has made his name in the Taiwan music scene. He was born on 26 February 1972.

== Biography ==
Born in Kuala Lumpur, Malaysia, Wong Pin Guan has a Hakka background with his family originating from Liancheng Village, Pingshang Township, Hebo Township, Jiexi County, Guangdong Province.

In 1995, Pinguan signed a contract with Taiwan's Rolling Stone Records and formed the singing group Indy with Kwang Leung. In 2000, Pinguan signed a contract with Taiwan's Rolling Stone Records and formed the singing group Indy. After the disbandment of Indochine in 2000, he released 10 solo albums.

== Discography ==
- 2000 – 自创品牌
- 2001 – 疼你的责任
- 2002 – 教堂的初吻
- 2003 – u-turn 180•转弯
- 2004 – 门没锁
- 2005 – 后来的我新歌+精选
- 2006 – 爱到无可救药
- 2007 – Need U Most 最需语你 – K歌情人
- 2008 – 那些女孩教我的事
- 2009 – 一切为了爱 新歌加精选
- 2010 – 當品冠遇見幾米 我想記得的47件事
- 2011 – 未拆的禮物(A Gift of Love)
- 2014 – 隨時都在
- 2015 – 無法理解的大人
- 2018 – 靈魂伴侶 (粵語: ling4 wan4 bun6 leoi5), 另一種開始 (國語)

== Filmography ==
- Ice Kacang Puppy Love (2010)
- Jie Mei (2011)
- Rhythm of the Rain (2013)
- Death Trip (2015)
