= Fairy Tale (Michael Wong album) =

Studio album by Michael Wong
- Released: 21 January 2005
- Recorded: 2004–2005
- Genre: Pop; R&B
- Language: Mandarin
- Label: Rock Records

Michael Wong chronology
Ray of Light (2002)	Fairy Tale (2005)	Commitment (2006)

Singles from Fairy Tale
- 1. "Fairy Tale" Released: 21 January 2005; 2. "Teenager" Released: 21 January 2005

Fairy Tale (Chinese: 童話; pinyin: Tóng Huà) is the third studio album by Malaysian singer-songwriter Michael Wong. It was released by Rock Records on 21 January 2005.

Wong's previous two albums, Michael's First Album and Ray of Light earned a fan base but did not make much ground in terms of record sales. Fairy Tale was critically acclaimed and became Wong's best-selling album.

== Composition and singles ==
The titular single "Fairy Tale" was composed by himself. Wong, who is more of a composer and hardly wrote lyrics, asked about 30 lyricists for suggestions for this particular song. After finally adding a finishing touch to the song with lyrics he wrote himself, he then left it to be arranged and produced by the experienced Japanese producer, Taichi Nakamura.

"Fairy Tale" became number one at the Baidu 500 immediately after it was released in January 2005, making it to the top of the download counter for 15 weeks. The single is arguably the most successful Chinese-language song in the 21st century. As of 2007, it is still among the top in the karaoke charts. Wong became the first Malaysian to win four main awards in the Chinese music scene's biggest award show, the Hong Kong TVB8 Golden Music Awards on 3 December 2005. He won Best Composition, Best Composer/Artist, Top Ten Songs of the Year, and Best of the Year's Top 10 Songs.

The music video accompanying "Fairy Tale" has been the subject of heated debate. It depicts Wong playing the song at a concert, transmitted to a girl in a hospital bed by phone. Intermittent flashbacks during the song reveal that she had a nosebleed before collapsing. She was most likely suffering from some form of cancer. At the conclusion of the video, she dies, and a voice-over says, "When the whole world ignores me, only you can never ignore me okay?"

== Cover versions ==
Hong Kong singer Charlene Choi, part of the Cantopop duo Twins, sang a cover version of "Fairy Tale" in Cantonese. Singaporean pop singer Aliff Aziz sang a cover version in Malay titled Cinta Arjuna. Cambodian singer Sokun Nisa sang a cover of the song in Khmer called Srok Trik Pneak Pel kom Pong Nhor Nhim. Japanese singer Kousuke Atari sang a cover version in Japanese. Korean singer Kim Hyung Joong sang a cover version in Korean called Dong Hwa (동화).

Indonesian singer Yuni Shara sang the cover version in Indonesian titled Selamanya Aku Milikmu, the song was later used as soundtrack of Indonesian TV series Saur Sepuh. In Vietnam, the song was covered by multiple singers in Vietnamese, such as two male singers Minh Vương M4U (under title Đồng thoại), Nam Cường (under title Thiên sứ tình yêu) and most known was female singer Đông Nhi (under same title used for Minh Vương M4U cover version but different lyrics).

== Track listing ==
1. "Intro"
2. "童話" (Tóng Huà; Fairy Tale)
3. "天堂" (Tiāntáng; Heaven)
4. "少年" (Shàonián; Teenager)
5. "手機留言" (Shǒu Jī Liú Yan; Cellphone Voice Message)
6. "向左走向右走" (Xiàng Zuǒ Zǒu Xiàng Yoù Zǒu; Turn Left Turn Right)
7. "一點光一點亮" (Yī Diǎn Guāng Yī Diǎn Liàng; Little Light, Little Bright)
8. "期限" (Qī Xiàn; Deadline)
9. "海邊" (Hǎi Biān; Beside the Sea)
10. "妹妹" (Mèimèi; Little Sister)
11. "記得我愛你" (Jì de Wǒ Ài Nǐ; Remember I Love You)
12. "The End"

=== Bonus MV VCD ===
1. Fairy Tale 童話
2. The First Time 第一次
3. Sadness Subway 傷心地鐵
4. Christmas in 2999 2999年的聖誕節
5. As if nothing had happened 若無其事

== Sales ==
Region	Certification	Certified units/sales
Asia	—	1,200,000
