= Fish Leong discography =

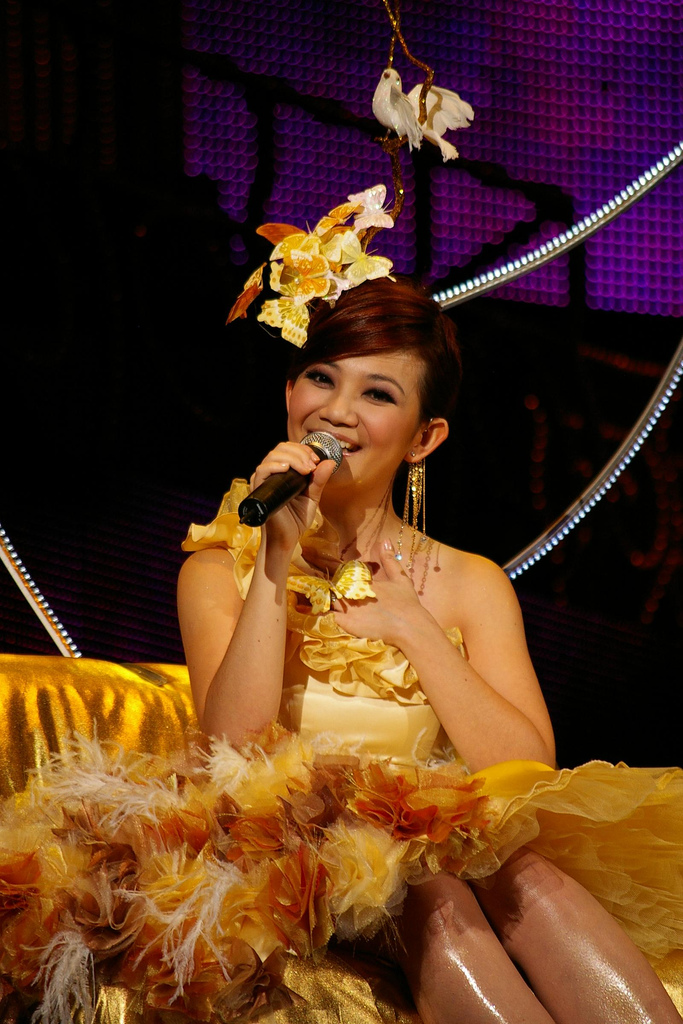
- Leong in 2007
- Studio albums: 14
- EPs: 2
- Compilation albums: 2
- Live albums: 3

The discography of Malaysian recording artist Fish Leong consists of 14 studio albums, 2 extended plays, 2 compilation albums, and 3 live albums. Leong made her debut under Rock Records in Taiwan with the studio album, Grown Up Overnight (1999). It was met with minimal success due to the 1999 Taiwan earthquake that took place days after its release, causing promotions for the album to be halted. She would later find greater success with her second studio album Courage (2000), which garnered sales of over 1,200,000 copies in Asia and 250,000 copies in Taiwan.

Leong's first compilation album, The Power of Love (2003), was met with commercial success and sold over 1.5 million copies through Asia, including 500,000 copies in China, 300,000 copies in Taiwan, 50,000 copies in Hong Kong and over 100,000 copies in Southeast Asia, making it her best-selling album. Her eleventh studio album What Love Songs Didn't Tell You (2010) sold over 900,000 copies in Asia. As of 2024, Leong has sold a total of over 20 million albums throughout her career.

== Studio albums ==
List of studio albums, with release date, label, and sales shown
Title	Album details	Peak chart positions	Sales
Title	Album details	TWN	Sales
Grown Up Overnight	Released: 17 September 1999; Label: Rock Records; Formats: CD, cassette	—	
Courage	Released: 2 August 2000; Label: Rock Records; Formats: CD, cassette	—	Asia: 1,200,000; TWN: 250,000
Shining Star	Released: 27 June 2001; Label: Rock Records; Formats: CD, cassette	—	TWN: 200,000
Sunrise	Released: 7 February 2002; Label: Rock Records; Formats: CD, cassette	—	
Beautiful	Released: 12 February 2003; Label: Rock Records; Formats: CD, cassette	—	TWN: 120,000
Wings of Love	Released: 10 September 2004; Label: Rock Records; Formats: CD, cassette	—	TWN: 120,000
Silkroad of Love	Released: 16 September 2005; Label: Rock Records; Formats: CD, digital download	2	
Kissing the Future of Love	Released: 6 October 2006; Label: B'in Music, Rock Records; Formats: CD, digital download	1	
J'Adore	Released: 9 November 2007; Label: B'in Music, Rock Records; Formats: CD, digital download	1	TWN: 100,000
Fall in Love & Songs	Released: 16 January 2009; Label: B'in Music, Universal; Formats: CD, digital download	1	
What Love Songs Didn't Tell You	Released: 24 December 2010; Label: Universal; Formats: CD, digital download	—	Asia: 900,000
Love in Heart	Released: 10 August 2012; Label: Universal; Formats: CD, digital download	3	
The Sun Also Rises	Released: 16 May 2019; Label: Mars, Universal; Formats: CD, digital download	—	
The Wonder of Wandering Life	Released: 19 May 2023; Label: Sam's Entertainment, Warner Taiwan; Formats: CD, digital download	—	

== Compilation albums ==
Title	Album details	Sales
The Power of Love	Released: 22 November 2003; Label: B'in Music, Rock Records; Formats: CD, digital download	Asia: 1,500,000; TWN: 300,000; CHN: 500,000; HK: 50,000; SGP: 50,000; MLY: 50,000
I Love You Hereafter	Released: 1 February 2011; Label: B'in Music; Formats: CD, digital download	

== Extended plays ==
Title	Album details
I Do?	Released: 12 December 2008; Label: B'in Music, Rock Records; Formats: CD, digital download
The Sonnet of Three Days	Released: 1 September 2021; Label: Fish Leong; Formats: CD, digital download

== Live albums ==
Title	Album details
Time & Love	Released: 30 May 2002; Label: Rock Records; Formats: CD
Love Parade	Released: 4 March 2005; Label: Rock Records; Formats: CD
Today Is Our Valentine's Day	Released: 26 August 2008; Label: B'in Music, Rock Records; Formats: CD, digital download

== Collaborations ==
- "Songs of the Earth" (1998) - with Alex To, Bobby Chen, Chyi Yu, Karen Mok, Mayday, Michael Wong, Richie Jen, Victor Wong, Rene Liu, Wakin Chau, Wanfang, Winnie Hsin, Angelica Lee, Fengie Wang, Bobby Dou, Tarcy Su, Walkie Talkie
- "Love" (2000) - with Rene Liu from I'll Be Waiting for You
- "I Love You Very Much" (2004) - with Victor Wong from Door Unlocked
- "Way Back into Love" (2007) - with Victor Wong from Need You Most (between English version and Mandarin version)
- "Still Good Friends" (2008) - with Leo Ku from Still the Master of Love Songs, as well from her EP, I Do?
- "Love x Love" (2012) - with Will Pan, Da Mouth (vocal: Harry & Aisa Senda), Cyndi Wang, Rachel Liang, Lee Chien-na, OneTwoFree, Jane Huang, Vision Wei, Bibi Zhou and Jason Zhang
- "Meant to Be" (2016) - with Christine Fan from Fanfan's Time to Give Thanks
