= Ethan Juan =

Taiwanese actor and model (born 1982)

- Juan in 2026
- Born: Ruan Ching-tien; 8 November 1982 (age 43); Taichung, Taiwan
- Other names: Ethan Ruan; Ruan Jing-tian
- Education: Hsing Wu University
- Occupations: Actor; model
- Years active: 2002–present
- Awards: Golden Horse Awards – Best Leading Actor; 2010 Monga

Chinese name
- Traditional Chinese: 阮經天
- Simplified Chinese: 阮经天
Transcriptions
Standard Mandarin
- Hanyu Pinyin: Ruǎn Jīngtiān

Ethan Juan (traditional Chinese: 阮經天; simplified Chinese: 阮经天; pinyin: Ruǎn Jīngtiān; Wade–Giles: Juan Ching-t'ien, born 8 November 1982) is a Taiwanese actor and model. He gained popularity for idol dramas Green Forest, My Home (2005), Wayward Kenting (2007), Fated to Love You (2008), and My Queen (2009) and had a frequent collaboration with Doze Niu, who directed Monga (2010), earning Juan Best Leading Actor at the 47th Golden Horse Awards. His other notable films include The Guillotines (2010), The Assassin (2015), Detective Dee: The Four Heavenly Kings (2018), and The Pig, The Snake and The Pigeon (2023).

== Early life ==
Juan was born in a military dependents' village in Taichung, Taiwan, to a military family with their ancestral roots in Zhejiang. His father was a soldier, his mother a military nurse, and his younger brother an air force pilot. Before fourth grade, Juan was raised by his grandparents. His grandfather, a seasoned veteran, transitioned from military service to a civilian role as the secretary of the board of directors at China Medical University. His grandmother was a homemaker. Due to his father's fiery character, Juan's parents split when he was in primary school (and officially divorced in 2021). He followed his mother, who then opened a red tea shop to support their livelihood.

As a competitive swimmer in his early years, Juan's numerous achievements and awards (including first place at the Taichung City Duathlon) gained him admission into the prestigious Taichung First Senior High School. However, due to his rebellious streak, he dropped out and, after being transferred and expelled from five different high schools, eventually graduated from the night school of Taichung's Shin Min High School after five years of high school. Thereafter, Juan attended the China University of Technology in Taipei but dropped out. He then attended the Hsing Wu University from 2004, majoring in tourism for over 6 years. After controversy emerged over his allegedly deliberate evasion of the military service by delaying graduation, he left before graduation to serve one year of alternative service at the Ministry of Education in lieu of military service from 2012 to 2013.

== Career ==
In 2002, when he accompanied a friend to an audition, he was chosen for his first showbiz gig in Penny Tai's music video for "Once Fell In Love" (愛過), after which he signed up with model agency Catwalk Entertainment. He then appeared in a series of music videos for popular artists such as Faye Wong, Stefanie Sun, A-Mei and S.H.E.

Ruan made his acting debut in the 2004 TV drama Michael the Archangel, where he plays the role of a talented but moody dancer with an eerie and feminine aura. His performance caught the attention of director Doze Niu, who would become his mentor. Juan had his first breakthrough in Green Forest, My Home (2005) but his subsequent roles in Hanazakarino Kimitachihe (2006) and Summer x Summer (2006) were not outstanding. It wasn't until 2007, when Juan starred in Doze Niu's idol drama Wayward Kenting (2007) that his acting began to receive positive notices. Since then, Juan started a long-time collaboration with Niu and became known as one of Niu's "Four Disciples", along with Eddie Peng, Li Wei, and Ryan Tang.

Ruan had a breakout success for Fated to Love You (2008), the highest rated Taiwanese idol drama ever. This was followed by another hit drama, My Queen, in 2009. In 2010, Juan won the Best Leading Actor award at the 47th Golden Horse Awards for his role in Doze Niu's gangster film Monga, making him the youngest actor ever to receive the honor. He subsequently extended his career to mainland China, starring in romance film Love (2012) directed by Niu and wuxia film The Guillotines (2012) directed by Andrew Lau.

In 2012, Juan served one year of alternative service at the Ministry of Education in lieu of military service due to his flat feet (a recognized medical condition) in Taiwan, and was discharged on January 11, 2013. During his post at the Ministry of Education, he received a monthly salary of NT$9,955. After the service, on 5 March 2013, Juan announced that he will be opening a talent management agency (together with Doze Niu and Lee Lieh). He reunited with Doze Niu in the military film Paradise in Service (2014), which earned him a nomination at the Asian Film Awards for Best Actor. In 2017, Juan returned to the small screen with the tomb-raiding drama The Weasel Grave. The same year, he played the role of a psychotic killer in the crime suspense film The Liquidator. In 2018, Juan starred in the fantasy adventure drama Legend of Fuyao alongside Yang Mi. In 2023, the Taiwanese action thriller The Pig, The Snake and The Pigeon starring Juan became a sleeper hit in China.

== Personal life ==
Upon entering showbiz, Ethan Juan began a relationship with his then-manager, Chang Te Lin, who is 12 years his senior, until he fell for his Green Forest, My Home co-star Esther Liu in 2005. Their relationship was opposed by Liu's agency, leading him back to Chang. From 2006 to 2007, Juan dated Joanna Shao, a wealthy woman four years his senior whom he met at a nightclub. In 2008, Shao revealed Juan's sexual preferences to a gossip magazine and claimed that he had been seeing her and Tiffany Hsu at the same time for nearly a month.

In 2007, the relationship between Juan and Tiffany Hsu was made public by paparazzi photographs of them on a beach date in Kenting. In 2010, Juan was caught in a hotel with another woman. After the news broke, Hsu changed her relationship status on Facebook from "in a stable relationship" to "complicated". In March 2015, Juan was rumored to be in a relationship with Zhou Dongyu. He denied the rumors but admitted to temporarily separating from Hsu. Zhou responded to the rumor on Weibo, "Fake." In October, Apple Daily reported that Juan and Hsu had ended their eight-year relationship due to Juan's affair with a married Chinese actress with children. Juan denied the affair.

Juan was rumored to be in a relationship with Song Zu'er in 2019 and broke up at the end of 2020, although both parties denied it. In February 2022, Juan posted a photo with a woman on his Instagram story and admitted to dating an office worker. They broke up five months later.

== Filmography ==
=== Film ===
| Year | English title | Original title | Role | Notes |
|---|---|---|---|---|
| 2007 | Exit No. 6 | 六号出口 | Vance | |
| 2007 | Brotherhood of Legio | 神选者 | Ah Jian | |
| 2008 | Orz Boyz | 囧男孩 | Scammer | Cameo |
| 2009 | New Boy Jiali | 男生贾里新传 | Teacher Cha | Cameo |
| 2009 | L-O-V-E | 爱到底 | Xiao Tian | Segment "Lucky" (三声有幸) |
| 2010 | Monga | 艋舺 | Monk (He Tianyou) | |
| 2012 | Love | 爱love | Xiao Kuan | |
| 2012 | The Guillotines | 血滴子 | Team Leader Cold | |
| 2014 | Paradise in Service | 军中乐园 | Xiao Bao | |
| 2015 | The Unbearable Lightness of Inspector Fan | 暴走神探 | Fan Ruyi | |
| 2015 | The Assassin | 刺客聂隐 | Xia Jing | |
| 2015 | Cities in Love | 恋爱中的城市 | Xiao Mai | |
| 2016 | Kill Time | 谋杀似水年华 | Qiu Shou | |
| 2016 | New York New York | 纽约纽约 | Lu Tu | |
| 2016 | Never Said Goodbye | 谎言西西里 | Tian Bo | |
| 2017 | The Liquidator | 心理罪之城市之光 | Jiang Ya | |
| 2018 | Detective Dee: The Four Heavenly Kings | 狄仁杰之四大天王 | Yuan Ce | |
| 2019 | The Knight of Shadows: Between Yin and Yang | 神探蒲松龄之兰若仙踪 | | |
| 2019 | The Eight Hundred | 八佰 | | |
| 2022 | The Abandoned | 查無此心 | Lin You-sheng | |
| 2023 | Be With Me | 車頂上的玄天上帝 | Mr. Yu | |
| 2023 | The Pig, The Snake and The Pigeon | 周處除三害 | Chen Kui-lin | |
| 2026 | Arrested Memory | 狂忘警探 | Detective Lee | |

=== Television series ===
| Year | English title | Original title | Role | Notes |
|---|---|---|---|---|
| 2004 | Michael the Archangel's Dance | 米迦勒之舞 | Ghost | |
| 2005 | Green Forest, My Home | 绿光森林 | Owen | |
| 2006 | Hanazakarino Kimitachihe | 花样少年少女 | Shen Le | |
| 2007 | Summer x Summer | 热情仲夏 | Qiao Shan | |
| 2007 | Wayward Kenting | 我在垦丁天气晴 | Shao Nan | |
| 2008 | Fated to Love You | 命中注定我愛你 | Ji Cunxi | |
| 2008 | Invincible Shan Bao Mei | 无敌珊宝妹 | Ji Cunxi | Cameo |
| 2009 | My Queen | 敗犬女王 | Lucas | |
| 2017 | The Weasel Grave | 鬼吹灯之黄皮子坟 | Hu Bayi | Web series |
| 2018 | Legend of Fuyao | 扶摇 | Zhangsun Wuji | |
| 2019 | Love in a Fallen City | 一身孤注掷温柔 | Yu Haoting | |
| 2020 | Cupid's Kitchen | 舌尖上的心跳 | Jiang Qianfan | |

=== Variety show ===
| Year | English title | Original title | Role | Notes |
|---|---|---|---|---|
| 2015-2016 | The Great Challenge | 了不起的挑战 | Cast member | |
| 2016 | Date ! Super Star | 約吧！大明星 | Cast member | |
| 2021 | The Pursuit of Happiness | 念念桃花源 | Cast member | |

== Discography ==
| Year | English title | Original title | Album | Notes |
|---|---|---|---|---|
| 2003 | "Riverside Park" | 河濱公園 | Super Star | with Selina Jen & Hebe Tien |
| 2005 | "Brave Happiness" | 勇敢的幸福 | Green Forest, My Home OST | |
| 2005 | "Three Words" | 三个字 | Green Forest, My Home OST | |
| 2008 | "It's Quiet Now" | 安静了 | FM S.H.E | with Selina Jen |
| 2009 | "No If" | 沒有如果 | Fall in Love & Songs | with Fish Leong |
| 2010 | "Bravely Love" | 勇敢爱 | —N/a | |
| 2010 | "Tonight Tonight" | —N/a | Monga OST | |
| 2010 | "Once" | —N/a | Monga OST | |
| 2012 | "Those Were the Days" | 友情岁月 | The Guillotines OST | with Huang Xiaoming & Shawn Yue |

== Awards and nominations ==
| Year | Award | Category | Nominated work | Result | Ref. |
|---|---|---|---|---|---|
| 2010 | 47th Golden Horse Awards | Best Leading Actor | Monga | Won | |
| 2010 | 54th Asia-Pacific Film Festival | Best Actor | Monga | Nominated | |
| 2010 | 12th Taipei Film Awards | Best Actor | Monga | Nominated | |
| 2011 | 5th Asian Film Awards | Best Actor | Monga | Nominated | |
| 2015 | 9th Asian Film Awards | Best Actor | Paradise in Service | Nominated | |
| 2016 | 8th Macau International Movie Festival | Best Supporting Actor | Never Said Goodbye | Nominated | |
| 2018 | 24th Huading Awards | Best Actor (Ancient Drama) | Legend of Fuyao | Nominated | |
| 2023 | 60th Golden Horse Awards | Best Leading Actor | The Pig, the Snake and the Pigeon | Nominated | |
| 2024 | 5th Taiwan Film Critics Society Awards | Best Actor | The Pig, the Snake and the Pigeon | Won | |
| 2024 | 26th Taipei Film Awards | Best Actor | The Pig, the Snake and the Pigeon | Won | |
