= I Love You Hereafter =

I Love You Hereafter - 2004-2009 Fish Leong's Hits

Compilation album 現在開始我愛你 by Fish Leong
- Released: 1 February 2011
- Genre: Mandopop
- Language: Mandarin
- Label: B'in Music; Universal Music Taiwan

Fish Leong chronology
What Love Songs Didn't Tell You 情歌沒有告訴你 (2010)	I Love You Hereafter - 2004-2009 Fish Leong's Hits (2011)	Love in Heart 愛久見人心 (2012)

I Love You Hereafter - 2004-2009 Fish Leong's Hits (traditional Chinese: 現在開始我愛你; simplified Chinese: 现在开始我爱你; pinyin: Xian Zai Kai Shi Wo Ai Ni) is Fish Leong's second compilation album. It was released on 1 February 2011 by B'in Music and Universal Music Taiwan in a 2CD/DVD format, and the DVD includes 18 music videos. The new album is a "sequel" to her first greatest hits album The Power of Love that came out eight years ago.

The album features two new songs, namely "比較愛" (Compare Love) and "蔚藍海岸" (La Côte d'Azur), and 18 major hits from her six studio albums released from year 2004 to 2009.

== Track listing ==
Disc one
No.	Title	Pinyin title	Length
1.	"Compare Love" (比較愛)	Bi Jiao Ai
2.	"Love Song" (情歌)	Qing Ge	4:20
3.	"Pain That Breathes" (會呼吸的痛)	Hui Hu Xi De Tong
4.	"Sadly, It's Not You" (可惜不是你)	Ke Xi Bu Shi Ni
5.	"Kisses" (親親)	Qin Qin
6.	"C'est La Vie"
7.	"Don't Shed Any More Tears for Him" (別再為他流淚)	Bie Zai Wei Ta Liu Lei	3:59
8.	"Admiration" (崇拜)	Chong Bai
9.	"Amnesia" (失憶)	Shi Yi
10.	"Silk Road" (絲路)	Si Lu

Disc two
No.	Title	Pinyin title	Length
1.	"Belonging To" (屬於)	Shu Yu	4:07
2.	"Warm" (暖暖)	Nuan Nuan
3.	"No If" (沒有如果)	Mei You Ru Guo	4:26
4.	"Swallowtail Butterfly" (燕尾蝶)	Yan Wei Die
5.	"I All Know" (我都知道)	Wo Dou Zhi Dao
6.	"Peaceful Summer" (寧夏)	Ning Xia
7.	"Small Hands Hold Big Hands" (小手拉大手)	Xiao Shou La Da Shou
8.	"Full of Love" (滿滿的都是愛)	Man Man De Dou Shi Ai
9.	"Today is Our Valentine's Day" (今天情人節)	Jing Tian Qing Ren Jie
10.	"La Cote d'Azur" (蔚藍海岸)	Wei Lan Hai An
