= Today Is Our Valentine's Day =

今天情人节 Today Is Our Valentine's Day

Studio album with live tracks by Fish Leong
- Released: 28 August 2008
- Genre: Mandarin pop
- Label: B'in Music

Fish Leong chronology
崇拜; J'Adore (2002)	今天情人节; Today Is Our Valentine's Day (2008)	静茹＆情歌-别再为他流泪; Fall in Love & Songs (2003)

Today Is Our Valentine's Day (Chinese: 今天情人节) is the third live album of Fish Leong (Chinese: 梁静茹), released on 28 August 2008.

== Track listing ==
1. 今天情人節
2. 如果能在一起
3. 我們就到這
4. 我決定 - Wo Jue Ding
5. 昨日情書 (A medley song of: Jody Chiang's Speechless Flower, Faye Wong's Red Bean, A-Mei and JJ Lin's Remember and Jacky Cheung's Love Letters)
6. 崇拜
7. 會呼吸的痛
8. 知足 (Original artist: Mayday)
9. 愛很簡單 (Original artist: David Tao)
10. 誘惑的街 (Original artist: Sandy Lam)
11. 夢醒時分 (Original artist: Sarah Chen)
12. C'est La Vie
13. Let's Fall in Love (Original artist: Karen Mok)
14. 滿滿的都是愛
