= Yong Qi =

Yong Qi or Yongqi may refer to:

- Yongqi, Prince Rong (永琪), a Manchu prince of the Qing dynasty
- Courage (Fish Leong album) (traditional Chinese: 勇氣; simplified Chinese: 勇气; pinyin: Yǒng Qì), an album by Malaysian singer Fish Leong
