= I'm Pets =

Album by Pets Tseng

- I'm Pets cover

Studio album 我是曾沛慈 by Pets Tseng
- Released: 17 December 2014
- Genre: Mandopop
- Length: 59:19
- Language: Mandarin
- Label: Linfair Records

Pets Tseng chronology
I'm Pets (2014)	I Love You, Period! (2017)

Singles from I'm Pets
- 1. "Just Lose It (Hurt So Much) (不過失去了一點點)" Released: 20 November 2014

I'm Pets (Chinese: 我是曾沛慈; pinyin: Wǒ shì Zēng Pèi Cí) is the debut studio album by Taiwanese singer Pets Tseng. It was released on 17 December 2014, by Linfair Records.

== Track listing ==
No.	Title	Lyrics	Music	Length
1.	"Black-Framed Glasses" (黑框眼鏡; hēi kuàng yǎn jìng)	Xiao Lu; Pets Tseng	Xiao Lu	3:58
2.	"Years Later" (多年後; duō nián hòu)	Penny	Penny	4:22
3.	"Just Lose It (Hurt So Much)" (不過失去了一點點; bù guò shī qù le yī diǎn diǎn)	Boss, Jerry Feng	Huang Po-hsun	5:03
4.	"The Little Things of a Nobody" (小人物的大願望; xiǎo rén wù dí dà yuàn wàng)	Penny Tai	Penny Tai	4:07
5.	"Fickle In Affection" (三分鐘熱度; sān fēn zhōng rè dù)	Xiaoyu (Cosmospeople)	Xiaoyu (Cosmospeople)	4:21
6.	"You Make Me Wanna" (不渴; bù kě)	Shiro Kou	Shiro Kou	4:43
7.	"Break Over" (跳出來; tiào chū lái)	Tina Wang	Tina Wang	3:46
8.	"Clash With Sweetness" (溫柔撞擊; wēn róu zhuàng jī)	Fang Wu	Fang Wu	3:35
9.	"Unbending Strong" (堅強過頭; jiān qiáng guò tóu)	Huang Ting	Ye Huai-pei	3:45
10.	"You Got Me" (這裡還有我; zhè lǐ huán yǒu wǒ)	David Ke	Liang Zheng	4:39
11.	"Tell Me It's Forever" (說好的永遠; shuō hǎo dí yǒng yuǎn)	Sha Sha	Sha Sha	3:56
12.	"Butterflies In My Stomach" (小路亂撞; xiǎo lù luàn zhuàng)	Pets Tseng	Pets Tseng	3:25
13.	"Keep Thinking of Someone" (一個人還是想著一個人; yī gè rén hái shì xiǎng zhe yī gè rén)	Jerry Feng; Yu Heng; Evangeline Wong	Yu Heng	4:52
14.	"Season of Rain" (雨季; yǔ jì)	Jerry Feng; Huang Po-hsun; Nasrin	Huang Po-hsun	4:39

== Music videos ==
Song	Director	Release date	Ref
"Just Lose It (Hurt So Much) (不過失去了一點點)"	Cheng Yu-chieh	9 December 2014	
"Years Later (多年後)"	Cheng Yu-chieh	24 December 2014	
"Black-Framed Glasses (黑框眼鏡)"	Howard Kuo & Allan Shen	12 January 2015	
"Unbending Strong (堅強過頭)"	—	26 March 2015	
"Keep Thinking Of Someone (一個人還是想著一個人)"	—	15 May 2015	
"Season of Rain (雨季)"	Howard Kuo & Allan Shen	8 September 2015	
