= Confession (Pets Tseng album) =

Album by Pets Tseng

- Confession cover

Studio album 謎之音 by Pets Tseng
- Released: 16 August 2019
- Genre: Mandopop
- Length: 44:50
- Language: Mandarin
- Label: AsiaMuse Entertainment
- Producer: Howe Chen; Chen Chien-chi; Alex Chang Jien; Starr Chen

Pets Tseng chronology
I Love You, Period! (2017)	Confession (2019)

Singles from Confession
- 1. "Miss You (大風吹)" Released: 16 July 2019; 2. "Confession (謎之音)" Released: 26 July 2019; 3. "The Distance Between Us (怎麼能這樣)" Released: 12 August 2019

Confession (Chinese: 謎之音; pinyin: Mí zhī yīn) is the third studio album by Taiwanese singer Pets Tseng. It was released on 16 August 2019, by AsiaMuse Entertainment, her first release with the label. Tseng co-wrote 2 out of the 10 tracks on the album.

== Track listing ==
No.	Title	Lyrics	Music	Length
1.	"Confession" (謎之音; mí zhī yīn)	David Ke	Lala Hsu	4:25
2.	"Crush" (水深火熱; shuǐ shēn huǒ rè)	Chen Shin-yan	Terence Lam	3:44
3.	"The Distance Between Us" (怎麼能這樣; zěn me néng zhè yàng)	David Ke	Yoyo Sham; Howe Chen	5:01
4.	"Waiting For" (我在你家樓下等你; wǒ zài nǐ jiā lóu xià děng nǐ)	Leon Zheng	Leon Zheng	4:46
5.	"Prayer" (尋找; xún zhǎo)	Pets Tseng	Pets Tseng	5:11
6.	"Nothing Can't Love" (沒什麼不能愛; méi shí me bù néng ài)	David Ke	Fang-Q; Mickey Lin	3:57
7.	"Let Go" (識趣; shí qù)	Rao Huibing	Wu Chen-hao	4:26
8.	"I Got Nothing" (沒有了; méi yǒu le)	Yi Jet Qi	Yi Jet Qi; Wu Guan Yan	4:12
9.	"Miss You" (大風吹; dà fēng chuī)	Alex Chang Jien	Alex Chang Jien	4:27
10.	"Daddy Is…"	Pets Tseng	Pets Tseng	4:36

== Music videos ==
Song	Director	Release date	Ref
"Confession (謎之音)"	JP Huang	26 July 2019	
"The Distance Between Us (怎麼能這樣)"	Fu Tien-yu	13 August 2019	
"Miss You (大風吹)"	Kay Jan	13 September 2019	
"Nothing Can't Love (沒什麼不能愛)"	Ares Wu	9 October 2019	
"Waiting For (我在你家樓下等你)"	Aikolove Liu	28 October 2019	
