= Wayward Kenting =

- official poster
- Also known as
- Traditional Chinese: 我在墾丁*天氣晴
- Simplified Chinese: 我在垦丁*天气晴
- Literal meaning: I'm in Kenting—"It's Sunny"
- Hanyu Pinyin: Wǒ Zài Kěndīng Tiānqì Qíng
- Created by: Chang Chao-sheng
- Written by: Wang Shau-di; Wen Yufang; Huang Chiung-hui; Chang Ko-hsin; Ko Yen-hsin
- Directed by: Doze Niu
- Starring: Eddie Peng; Janine Chang; Ethan Juan; Lee Kang-i; Lee Shiau-shiang; Doze Niu
- Music by: Hsu Sheng-hsiung; Huang Chiao-fu
- Opening theme: "You Ni de Kuaile" (有你的快樂) performed by Joanna Wang
- Ending theme: "Yinwei Ni Ai Wo" (因為你愛我) performed by Joanna Wang
- Country of origin: Taiwan
- Original languages: Mandarin; some English, Taiwanese Hokkien
- No. of episodes: 20

Production
- Producers: Doze Niu; Huang Chih-ming
- Cinematography: Ko Cheng-ming
- Running time: 45 minutes
- Production company: Honto Productions

Original release
- Network: Public Television Service
- Release: December 25, 2007 – February 16, 2008

Wayward Kenting (Chinese: 我在墾丁*天氣晴) is a 20-part Taiwanese television series produced by Honto Production and directed by Doze Niu. Most scenes were shot in Hengchun, Taiwan. Wayward Kenting received the Golden Bell Awards for Best Writing for a Television Series and nominations in three other categories.

== Synopsis ==
Zhong Hanwen (Eddie Peng), Liangliang (Lee Kang-i) and Azuo (Lee Shiau Shiang) are good friends who all grew up in Kenting. Wayward Kenting tells the story of their attempts to protect the environment of their home. The series focuses on love, dreams and responsibility.

== Cast ==
- Eddie Peng as Zhong Hanwen, a twenty-two-year-old man who grows up in Kenting. He is outgoing and kind-hearted. When he reads the article written by DingXiaohui (a famous writer), he falls in love. They begin talking to each other on the Internet. Their story begins when DingXiaohui travels to Kenting.
- Lee Kang-i as Liangliang, a twenty-two-year-old girl who works in the National Park of Kenting. She is an enthusiastic person, always ready to help people in need. ZhongHanwen and Azuo are both her best friends.
- Sean as Azuo, a twenty-two-year-old policeman. He is wild and brave. Everybody in his neighbourhood knows him. He becomes a shy man around Liangliang. He has been in love with her for many years, but is afraid to show his affection. Afterwards, with the help of ZhongHanwen, he pursues Liangliang desperately.
- Ethan Juan as Guo Shaonan, a twenty-seven-year-old man who works as an illustrator. He and his mother were dropped by his father when he was small. He has once been abroad for nearly two years. At twenty-five, he returns to Kenting despite his mother's strong opposition. Disappointed with his father's cruel treatment, he sets his mind to make great achievements. When in Kenting, he meets Liangliang and develops a romantic relationship.
- Doze Niu as Chu Yiyang, a forty-five-year-old man who runs a variety of bars. His wife divorces him because of his failure in investments. After that, he comes to Kenting. He is so generous and warm-hearted that he wins the respect of local residents.
- Christopher Downs an international environment assessor, who goes to Kenting with DingXiaohui.
- Lin Mei-hsiu as Liangliang's mother
- Weber Yang as ice-cream vendor (cameo)

== Episodes ==
Lost in paradise--Joanna Wang (王若琳)

As love begins to mend--Joanna Wang (王若琳)

Unparalleled beauty--Sodagreen (苏打绿)

== Release ==
Wayward Kenting was put on screen on December 17, 2007.

== Awards and nominations ==
Year	Ceremony	Category	Result
2008	43rd Golden Bell Awards	Best Writing for a Television Series	Won
2008	43rd Golden Bell Awards	Best Television Series	Nominated
2008	43rd Golden Bell Awards	Best Actor - (Eddie Peng)	Nominated

== Merchandise ==
- Book: It Is Sunny In Kenting — released in the year 2007
- DVD: It Is Sunny In Kenting — released in the year 2008
