= Sweety =

Taiwanese musical duo

- Origin: Taiwan
- Genres: Mandopop
- Years active: 2003−2006
- Labels: Forward Music
- Members: Esther Liu; Joanne Tseng

Sweety was a Taiwanese musical duo formed by Esther Liu (Chinese: 劉品言; pinyin: Liú Pǐnyán; colloquially known as Yan Yan (言言); born August 8, 1988) and Joanne Tseng (Chinese: 曾之喬; pinyin: Zēng Zhīqiáo; colloquially known as Qiao Qiao (喬喬); born November 17, 1988). The duo were formed in 2002 and debuted in 2003 at the age of 14.

Sweety were active from 2003 to 2006 and has released 3 studio albums and 2 soundtracks. They went on hiatus as a group since 2007 when Liu went to Paris to study for a few years, while Tseng continued with her solo career.

Apart from singing, both members have also acted in films and television series.

== Discography ==
=== Studio albums ===
Released	English title	Original title
January 8, 2003	Hi! Sweety	—N/a
June 17, 2005	17 Years Old, Not Delicate	17歲X不溫柔
June 23, 2006	Sweet Talk Vol. 3	花言喬語

=== Soundtracks ===
We'll Go on the Stage (released on February 14, 2003)
Green Forest, My Home (綠光森林 Lǜ Guāng Sēn Lín) (September 9, 2005)
