= Green Forest, My Home =

Taiwanese television series

- Promotional poster
- 綠光森林
- Genre: Romance; Comedy
- Directed by: Feng Kai; Mai Guan Zhī
- Starring: Leon Jay Williams; Esther Liu; Ethan Juan; Song Zhi Ai
- Opening theme: "Brave Happiness (勇敢的幸福)" by Sweety
- Ending theme: "No Exit(無法開口)" by William So
- Country of origin: Taiwan
- Original language: Mandarin
- No. of series: 1
- No. of episodes: 15

Production
- Producer: Sun Yu-feng
- Production location: Taiwan
- Running time: 60 minutes
- Production company: Sanlih E-Television

Original release
- Network: TTV
- Release: 23 October 2005 – 5 February 2006

Related
- The Prince Who Turns into a Frog; The Magicians of Love

Green Forest, My Home (Chinese: 綠光森林; pinyin: Lǜ Guāng Sēn Lín) is a Taiwanese television series released in 2005. Consisting of a total of 15 episodes, it was broadcast by the SETTV network. It stars Esther Liu, Leon Jay Williams, Ethan Juan, and Song Zhi Ai. Liu, who is also a member of the girl group Sweety, performs the opening theme song.

== Synopsis ==
The series is set in the fictional Royal Spencer Academy of Music. Sophie (Esther Liu) is a wealthy girl. Luoshan (Song Zhi Ai) is the daughter of Sophie's parents' chauffeur. When Luoshan's father dies in an accident while driving drunk, she is adopted by Sophie's family and takes the name Susan instead of Luoshan. Thereon, Susan plans to take whatever Sophie has.

== Summary ==
Su Fei (Sophie) grows up from a family with musical talent. She is a blessed and happy girl with a positive personality and no scheming thoughts. Luo Shan grows up in Sophie's family. Her father is the Su family's driver. Her mother ran away from home when Luo Shan was young and there has been no information from her since. Luo Shan is envious of Sophie and hopes that one day she can become the type of person that Sophie is.

Luo Shan's father died because he was driving under the influence of alcohol and there has been no information on Luo Shan's mother ever since she ran away when Luo Shan was young. As a result, Sophie's parents adopted Luo Shan and changed her name to Su San(Susan) and became Sophie's older sister.

Growing up as a driver's daughter and thinking of herself as a "low class person" has caused Susan to feel inferior. As a result, Susan has always had a wish. She wished that she can become someone like Sophie because she always believed that as long as she can become Sophie, then she would definitely be happy. Under this type of a psychological shadow, Susan fosters the behavior that as long as Sophie has it, then she must have it too. From childhood to adult, this is the way that Susan treats Sophie. Sophie knows but she continues to remember the words of her mother to regard Susan as her real sister and not to tell anyone that Susan is an adopted child. Moreover, Sophie believes that Susan must be like this because of her background and as a result, she didn't haggle over the matter with Susan.

Susan and Sophie along with Yuan Fang, who grew up together with them, were originally going to study at Green Light Forest, a school with no walls, Green Light Elementary School. However, because they had to move homes, they must leave Green Light Elementary School and go to study at Spencer Royal School of Music. Sophie, who loves her independence, was very unwilling but she still had to go to a school enclosed with high walls - Spencer Royal School of Music. Within the strict Spencer Music School, there is one rule: those who forget to bring their textbooks would receive a beating on their palms.

One day, the founder of Spencer Royal School of Music's son, William, arrives from Austria to listen in on a class. Sophie, who didn't know of William's identity, mistakenly thinks that he forgot to bring his textbook and lent her textbook to him. Because of this, she was punished for not bringing her textbook. William couldn't bear to see Sophie receive a beating on her palm because of trying to help him and pulling on Sophie, ran out of the classroom with her. They both skipped class and both got lost inside Green Light Forest. However, it is because they got lost that they saw the legendary green light. Inside the green light, an old grandmother in the forest told William, after he grows up, he would meet a girl that he will love very deeply. He must trust her, otherwise, this girl will lose everything because of him and maybe even lose her life. The old grandmother also told William and Sophie that in the world of love, time stands still. William and Sophie listens attentively and this speech seems to be deeply engraved in both of their small minds.

== Cast ==
=== Main cast ===
- Leon Jay Williams as William (Wei Lian) – 28 years old

William has the lineage of four beautiful countries - German, English, Chinese and American in his blood. He grows up under a noble, rich and powerful family. In addition, his ancestors were very good at investing and have left behind a very big fortune. Since he was young, he has received the appropriate care and was educated in aristocrat schools and by private tutors. His conduct is elegant, manner is graceful, speaks finely, there is no doubt about his noble upbringing. He inherited his family's artistic and literary talents and has extraordinary achievements in both music and art. Because he is aware of his responsibilities towards his family and society, as a result, he does things with rational and caution. He expresses his feelings with control, taking everything into consideration. Yet, underneath, he is very stubborn towards love and has the spirit of both a knight and a gentleman. He completely trusts, empathizes and cares for his girlfriend. His mother is from Green Light Forest. His return to the country this time, besides from taking over the position of CEO at the Spencer Music Institute, taking care of the school affairs with Spencer Educational Institute, he is also bringing his mother, the Countess, back to reside at her native country in Green Light Forest. Aside from that, he also hopes to find the girl that he met in his childhood years.

- Esther Liu as Sophie (Su Fei) – 24 years old

She comes from a loving family. As a child, she is well protected. Innocent, naive, kind-hearted. Because she is loved, therefore, she trusts people. The foolish quality in her personality does not disappear. She does not give up, shows enthusiasm in doing things and lives for her ideals. Her parents are musicians and frequently travels around the world performing. Their family has always been a wealthy middle class family with a generous fortune. The family is generous and well-mannered. Su Fei inherits all these good characteristics from her family and is good at forgiving others. Since she was young, Su Fei has had the artistic talent. In addition, her parents did not restrict her development. She possesses an artist's qualities, does not adhere to the standard norm, and has her own set of reasoning. Therefore, she often revolves around her own unique way of thinking causing headaches for those around her yet they wouldn't argue against her about it. She is straight forward, a little overcautious and indecisive. In order to look for materials for her project, she would run to the forest and chop off a tree but would forget that there is no way she can carry a big tree home all by herself. Also, in order to prove what she believes in, she would personally go to experience the matter or to participate, regardless of any consequences. As a result, she would always get herself all dirtied. Plus the fact that she is petite and has a habit of carrying a big bag on her back filled with all the things that she would need, she lives like that of Cinderella. You would never associate her with a virtuous and educated young woman. But since she is educated in an upper class society, the moment that she goes into a formal occasion, she would change around immediately and become a noble young lady. She has promised her parents that she will regard Su Shan as her own blood sister and will not tell anyone Su Shan's real identity, causing her to feel inferior. Because she is afraid that Su Shan would not feel any security with her own family background, as a result, Su Fei always gives in to Su Shan.

- Ethan Juan as Owen (Ou Wen) / Jin Yuan Fang – 28 years old

His personality is like a bad tempered celebrity and he hates the media. Even though he is famous around the world and gets endless invitations to perform, but he doesn't like to be well-known and he doesn't like power. Aside from the public performances in Spring and Autumn of every year, he would be roaming about living a calm life and searching for inspirations. Green Light Elementary School in Green Light Forest is the place where he is staying at right now. He is a bit clueless at times and has a unique sense of humor. He is extremely sharp and can easily guess what is on other people's minds. He uses either a humorous or joking attitude when interacting with others. As a result, when he has to face his feelings with sincerity, he would become shy. There are times when he would be very arrogant and think that all women love him, but in the end, he would get rejected. He has two sides to his personality. In front of the media, he would be cold and ruthless but in private, he is very witty and even if he wants to act cold, he wouldn't be able to. His thinking and focal point is different than the average person. His fearless attitude stems from the fact that when he was 7 years old, he received a famous European CBC Art Foundation scholarship that allowed him to go aboard to study. In addition he is well-known throughout the international music industry as the youngest violinist. He and his manager, Fiona, has a three month agreement, which is, he will use these three months to confirm Su Fei’s significance to him in his life. If he finds that there isn’t any significance or meaning, then he will get married with Fiona. He likes Su Fei, yet always loves to argue with her.

- Song Zhi Ai as Susan (Su Shan) / Luo Shan – 24 years old

Her original name is Luo Shan. Her father was Su Fei's family's driver. When she was 5 years old, her mother ran off with another man and created a wound in Luo Shan's heart. Su Fei's parents sympathizes that Luo Shan is the same age as their daughter and yet is lacking from a mother's care. As a result, they always ask Luo Shan to come over to their house to play after kindergarten school and also got both girls into the Spencer Royal School of Music to study music. Later, Luo Shan's father died from a car accident while protecting Su Fei's father and for this reason, Su Fei's parents adopted Luo Shan. They changed her name to Su Shan and regarded her as Su Fei's younger sister. Su Fei's parents never treated her any different just because she wasn't their real daughter yet Su Shan never trusted their sincerity. She is jealous that Su Fei possesses all the things that she never has. As a result, it fosters her stealing personality. She believes that just as long as it is something that Su Fei has then it must be good and she would have to steal it from Su Fei. She gives the public the wrong impression that Su Fei is the one that is adopted and because Su Fei has made a promise to her father, she never clarified this mistake and let Su Shan say what she wants. However, when the time comes when Su Fei wants to clarify the truth, no one would believe her. The mother that has left Su Shan when she was a child is the only person that will be able to expose her identity but she has now become the past that Su Shan never wants to bring up again. She is very capable and uses people's goodness to get what she wants. She schemes but within her heart, she is actually a little kid that has never grown up. On the surface she tries to look strong, doing all the bad things that she can think of. When she is alone by herself, she would reveal her fragile side.

=== Supporting cast ===
- David Chen as Brian Shang – 30 years old

Spencer Art Institutions board member, has an arrogant personality. Makes it his own responsibility to protect the excellent tradition of Spencer Institute. He has his own ideals on teaching. He believes that the best resources should be left to those outstanding students and not let people abuse it. He doesn't get along with William and causes people to feel that he is always against William. He admires Su Shan, understands Su Shan, and even as much as falls in love with Su Shan. In his eyes, the Su Shan that everyone detests is not hateful at all but she is pitiful. He supports Su Shan's thinking of using her hard work to get happiness. As a result, as long as the matter has to do with Su Shan, then he would help her out. Even when Su Shan wants to get her hands on William, he is able to give up his feelings for her and help her get William.

- Lin Ke Wei as Xie You Mei – 22 years old

Health education teacher of Green Light Elementary School. Is Su Fei's good friend. She has secretly loved Da Jie for a long time. Later, she tried her best to get Su Fei and Ou Wen together. Her English is not too good, but she is also trying to prove that she is good at it and often becomes a laughingstock. She is the origin of all the gossip in the village. She is rash and simple-minded, but is also a good person with a sense of justice

- Kido (KOne) as Sun Da Jie – 26 years old

A male nurse at Green Light Elementary School. He has a discrete and cautious personality. Very clean person and talks incessantly, a definite contrast to You Mei. Gets nervous easily, doesn't really know how to get along with little kids. He would often get bullied by the kids and You Mei would have to help him. You Mei admires him, but Da Jie never knew this.

== Soundtrack ==
Green Forest, My Home Original Soundtrack

Soundtrack album by Various artists
- Released: 15 November 2005
- Genre: Mandopop
- Language: Mandarin
- Label: EMI (TW)

Green Forest, My Home Original Soundtrack (CD) (綠光森林電視原聲帶) was released on 15 November 2005 by various artists under EMI (TW). It contains 18 tracks, in which 8 tracks are various instrumental versions of the songs. The opening theme is track 1 "Brave Happiness 勇敢的幸福" by Sweety, while the closing theme is track 3 "No Exit 無法開口" by William So 蘇永康.

=== Track listing ===
No.	Title	Singer(s)	Length
1.	"Brave Happiness" (勇敢的幸福)	Sweety	4:13
2.	"Brave Happiness" (勇敢的幸福)	Instrumental	4:08
3.	"No Exit" (無法開口)	William So 蘇永康	5:14
4.	"Green Forest (La La edition)" (綠光森林 (LaLa版))	Leon Jay Williams 立威廉	3:33
5.	"Bliss Joy" (Bliss的喜)	Instrumental	3:04
6.	"Cupid's Trick" (愛神惡作劇)	Sweety	3:23
7.	"Confrontation Love" (對峙的愛情)	Instrumental	3:29
8.	"Cupid's Trick" (愛神惡作劇)	Piano Instrumental	3:21
9.	"Green Legend" (綠光傳說)	A Bao 阿爆	3:35
10.	"A Person's Starlight (Male ver.)" (一個人的星光 (男))	William So 蘇永康	4:50
11.	"FOREVER"	Piano Instrumental	3:54
12.	"Three Words" (三個字)	Ethan Juan 阮經天, Joanne Tseng 曾之喬	4:18
13.	"William's Song" (威廉之歌)	Instrumental	4:16
14.	"Happy Smile" (幸福笑容)	A Bao 阿爆	4:07
15.	"Three Words" (三個字)	Flute Instrumental	4:18
16.	"A Person's Starlight (Female ver.)" (一個人的星光 (女))	Xu Jing Lan 許靜嵐	4:32
17.	"No Exit" (無法開口)	Cello Instrumental	3:27
18.	"Forever"	Leon Jay Williams 立威廉	3:54

== Awards and nominations ==
Year	Ceremony	Category	Result
2006	41st Golden Bell Awards	Best Marketing Programme	Nominated
2006	41st Golden Bell Awards	Best Sound Award	Nominated
2006	41st Golden Bell Awards	Best Directing for a Television Series; Feng Kai	Won
