= Pets Tseng =

Taiwanese singer and actress

- 曾沛慈
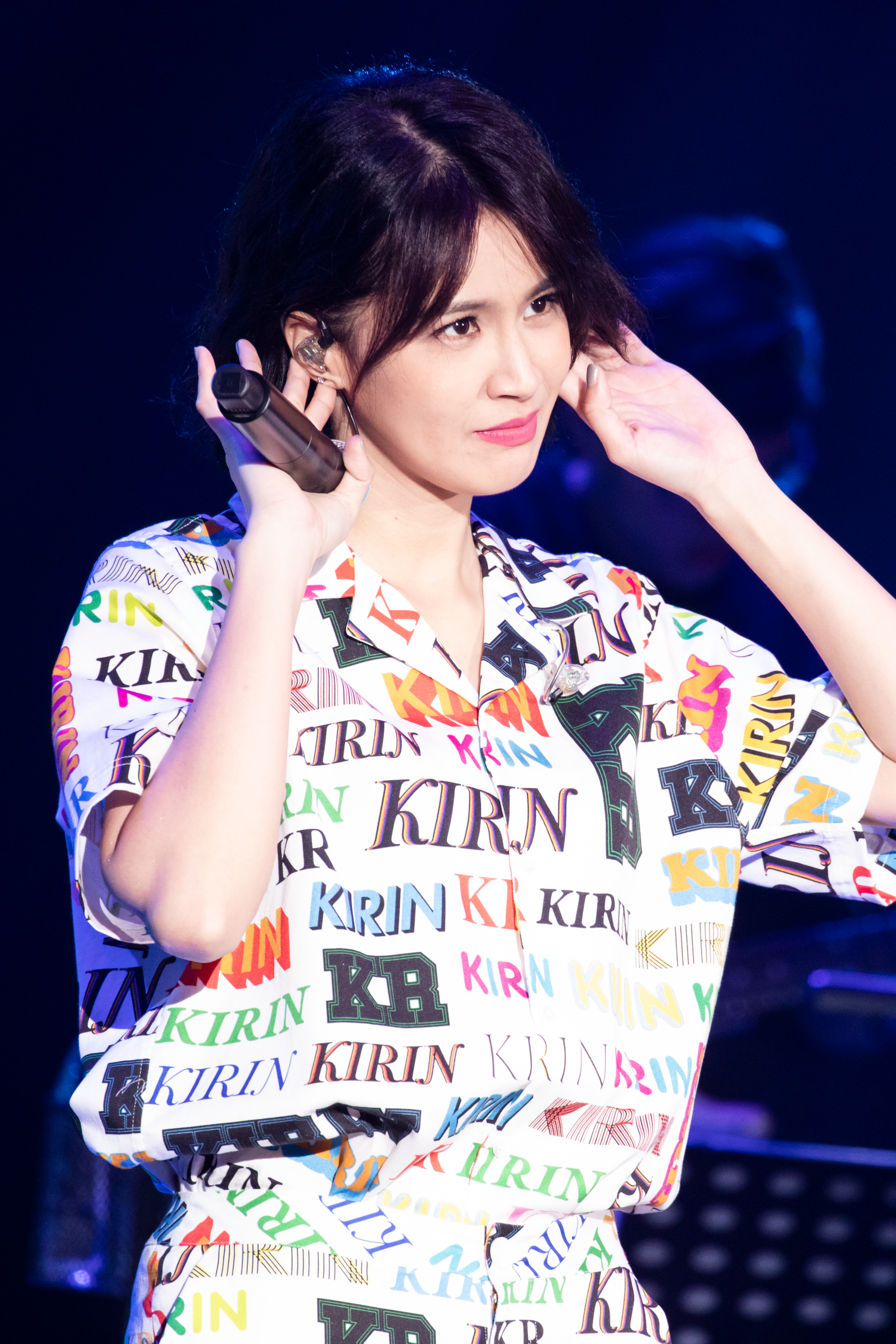
- Tseng in November 2019
- Born: Tseng Pei-tzu; October 21, 1984 (age 42); Taipei, Taiwan
- Other name: Zeng Peici
- Education: National Chung Cheng University (BA)
- Occupations: Singer; actress
- Years active: 2007–present
- Spouse: Peter Sun (m. 2022)
- Musical career
- Genre: Mandopop
- Instruments: Vocals, piano, guitar
- Labels: Linfair Records (2014–2017); Comic Communication (2009–2017); AsiaMuse Entertainment (2018–present)

Chinese name
- Chinese: 曾沛慈
Transcriptions
Standard Mandarin
- Hanyu Pinyin: Zēng Pèicí

Pets Tseng Pei-tzu (Chinese: 曾沛慈; born October 21, 1984) is a Taiwanese singer and actress.

== Early life and career ==
Born in Taipei, Tseng graduated from National Chung Cheng University with a degree in business administration.

In 2007, Tseng competed on the second season of singing competition program One Million Star in which she was placed sixth. She made her television debut in K.O.3an Guo (2009) and in 2012 she starred in drama series KO One Return. In 2014, she signed a recording deal with Linfair Records, and released her debut album, I'm Pets, in the same year. Her second album, I Love You, Period!, was released on July 2, 2017. In 2018, she signed a recording deal with AsiaMuse Entertainment and on August 16, 2019, she released her third studio album, Confession.

== Personal life ==
In January 2022, Tseng announced her marriage to Peter Sun, the guitarist of a religious band Joshua Band. Tseng and Sun have known each other for more than 10 years and dated for more than one-and-a-half years before marrying.

== Discography ==
=== Studio albums ===
Title	Album details	Track listing
I'm Pets	Released: December 17, 2014; Label: Linfair Records; Formats: CD, digital download	Track listing: 1. Black-Framed Glasses 黑框眼鏡; 2. Years Later 多年後; 3. Just Lose It (Hurt So Much) 不過失去了一點點; 4. The Little Things of a Nobody 小人物的大願望; 5. Fickle in Affection 三分鐘熱度; 6. You Make Me Wanna 不渴; 7. Break Over 跳出來; 8. Clash With Sweetness 溫柔撞擊; 9. Unbending Strong 堅強過頭; 10. You Got Me 這裡還有我; 11. Tell Me It's Forever 說好的永遠; 12. Butterflies in my Stomach 小路亂撞; 13. Keep Thinking of Someone 一個人還是想著一個人; 14. Season of Rain 雨季
I Love You, Period!	Released: July 2, 2017; Label: Linfair Records; Formats: CD, digital download	Track listing: 1. I Said Nothing Like That 我才沒有那樣呢; 2. There are Tears 我的淚; 3. Love is Paranoia 偏愛; 4. Can't Help But Wait 不認輸的等; 5. I'd Rather Be Alone Than Be Lied To 又不是非要你的愛; 6. If We Don't Belong Together 我不是你該愛的那個人; 7. Things We've Said 說過; 8. Chalk N Doodle 粉筆和塗鴉; 9. If You Leave Him at All 你離開他了嗎; 10. Along With Myself 和自己相遇; 11. What's Past Is Past 坦然; 12. No Longer Alone 不再怕寂寞; 13. I Love You 我愛你
Confession	Released: August 16, 2019; Label: AsiaMuse Entertainment; Formats: CD, digital download	Track listing: 1. Confession 謎之音; 2. Crush 水深火熱; 3. The Distance Between Us 怎麼能這樣; 4. Waiting For 我在你家樓下等你; 5. Prayer 尋找; 6. Nothing Can't Love 沒什麼不能愛; 7. Let Go 識趣; 8. I Got Nothing 沒有了; 9. Miss You 大風吹; 10. Daddy Is…
Memorable Moments	Released: August 12, 2022; Label: AsiaMuse Entertainment; Formats: CD, digital download	Track listing: 1. Down to Earth 下凡; 2. My Heart Belongs to You 只在意你的一切; 3. Let Go 慷慨; 4. Yes, I Do 是不是; 5. I Will Find You; 6. Memorable Moments 今天陽光就是特別耀眼特別和諧（feat. William Wei）; 7. Long Long Way; 8. Let Me Love You 我想對你好; 9. A Revolution of Love 我需要一些孤獨; 10. Back to the Beginning 心的碎片

=== Soundtrack albums ===
Title	Album details	Track listing
K.O.3an Guo (Original Soundtrack) 強辯之終極三國: 三團鼎立Super大鬥陣	Released: April 3, 2009; Label: B'in Music; Formats: CD, digital download	Track listing: 1. 夠愛 (with D.C.W); 2. 終極三國 (with D.C.W); 3. 淚了 (with D.C.W)
KO One Return (Original Soundtrack) 終極一班2 電視原聲帶	Released: January 18, 2013; Label: Comic International Productions; Formats: CD, digital download	Track listing: 1. Thinking of Someone 一個人想著一個人; 2. Lonely Starry Sky 數不盡的星空; 3. Lonely Time (Instrumental); 4. Dreaming (Instrumental)
Fabulous Boys (Original Television Drama Soundtrack) 原來是美男 電視原聲帶	Released: May 31, 2013; Label: Da Fang Entertainment; Formats: CD, digital download	Track listing: 1. Promise 約定 (with Jiro Wang and Evan Yo); 2. Gemma Fighting (with Jiro Wang and Evan Yo); 3. Can't Stop 愛情怎麼喊停; 4. Believe 相信嗎 (with Jiro Wang and Evan Yo)

=== Compilation albums ===
Title	Album details	Track listing
Star Reunion 2 星光二班線上數位專輯	Released: November 17, 2007; Label: Himalaya Records; Formats: CD, digital download	Track listing: 1. 傻瓜
One Million Star 2 – Top 10 Contestants Compilation 你們是我的星光 終極10強合輯	Released: January 30, 2008; Label: Universal Music Taiwan; Formats: CD, digital download	Track listing: 1. 你們是我的星光; 2. 火柴天堂; 3. 六道星光

=== Singles ===
Year	Title	Album
2013	"Bu Yao Zai Da Le 不要再打了" (with Jeremy Ji)	Sleepingwalking
2015	"Wild Things 放肆一下" (with Claire Kuo, Jin wen Tseng and Fang Wu)	Wild Things – Single
2016	"If We Don't Belong Together 我不是你該愛的那個人"	If We Don't Belong Together – Single

== Filmography ==
=== Television series ===
Year	English title	Original title	Role	Notes
2009	K.O.3an Guo	終極三國	Sun Shang-xiang	
2010	Love Buffet	愛似百匯	Da Ye's senior	Cameo
2011	They Are Flying	飛行少年	Fu En-hui	
2011	Sunny Girl	陽光天使	Angela	Dubbing
2012	KO One Return	終極一班2	Lei Ting / King	
2013	KO One Re-act	終極一班3	Lei Ting / King / Yeh Yu-hsiang	
2013	Fabulous Boys	原來是美男	Kao Mei-nan / Kao Mei-nu	Backing vocals
2014	The X-Dormitory	終極X宿舍	Lei Ting / King / Yeh Yu-hsiang	Cameo
2014	You Light Up My Star	你照亮我星球	Ai Ching	Cameo
2014	Angel 'N' Devil	終極惡女	Chieh Kei	Cameo
2015	Moon River	明若曉溪	Ming Hsiao-hsi	
2016	Rock Records in Love – Look Over Here, Girl	滾石愛情故事 – 對面的女孩看過來	Shen Wan-ni	
2016	KO ONE: RE-MEMBER	終極一班4	King / Sun Shang-hsiang / Yeh Yu-hsiang	
2016	Stand by Me	在一起，就好	Han Hsiao-chi	
2017	K.O.3an Guo 2017	終極三國2017	Lei Ting / King	Web series, cameo
2018	KO ONE: RE-CALL	終極一班5	Lei Ting / King	Web series, cameo
2019	The World Between Us	我們與惡的距離	Ying Si-yueh	
2019	All is Well – Taiwan	你那邊怎樣·我這邊OK	Liu Wei-yun	
2022	Dear Adam	親愛的亞當	Song Pin-wei	
TBA	Mr. Hito	接招吧！製作人		

=== Film ===
Year	English title	Original title	Role	Notes
2008	Stars	星光傳奇	Herself	Documentary

=== Variety show ===
Year	English title	Original title	Network	Notes
2012	Apple E-News	蘋果娛樂新聞	Next TV	Host (3 episodes)
2014	ShowBiz	完全娛樂	SET Metro	Host (1 episode)

=== Music video appearances ===
Year	Artist	Song title
2007	Energy	"Xing Kong"
2012	SpeXial	"Gone Mad"
2014	R-Chord	"Never Let You Down"
2014	SpeXial	"Subtle Love"

== Published works ==
- Tseng, Pets (2013). Fen Lie = Wu Xian Ke Neng: Wo Hai Shi Wo, Zeng Pei Ci. Taipei: Royal Road Books. ISBN 978-986-6010-78-1.

== Awards and nominations ==
Year	Award	Category	Nominated work	Result
2008	One Million Star (season 2)	—N/a	—N/a	6th place
2015	15th Global Chinese Music Awards	Top Twenty Hits	"Just Lose It (Hurt So Much)"	Won
2015	15th Global Chinese Music Awards	Most Popular New Artiste	I'm Pets	Won
2015	15th Global Chinese Music Awards	Top 5 Most Popular Female Artiste	I'm Pets	Won
2016	11th KKBOX Music Awards	Top 10 Singers of the Year	I'm Pets	Won
2016	2016 Hito Music Awards	Most Popular New Artist	I'm Pets	Won
2018	2018 Hito Music Awards	Most Popular Female Singer	I Love You, Period!	Nominated
2018	2018 Hito Music Awards	Rising Act	I Love You, Period!	Won
2018	2018 Hito Music Awards	Hito Popular Singer Campus	I Love You, Period!	Won
2019	54th Golden Bell Awards	Best Supporting Actress in a Television Series	The World Between Us	Won
