= Refresh Man =

- Promotional poster
- 後菜鳥的燦爛時代
- Genre: Romantic comedy
- Created by: Sanlih E-Television
- Written by: Xu Zhi Yi (Screenwriter coordinator); Xu Gui Ying (Screenwriter coordinator Ep. 1-17, Screenwriter Ep. 4-5); Wang You Zhen (Ep. 1-2); Zhang Fang Ying (Ep. 1-5); Zhan Yun Ru (Ep. 2, Ep. 7-10, Ep. 15); Zhuang Xin Fu (Ep. 6-17); Sun Shi Fan (Ep. 6-17); Chen Zhao Miao (Ep. 11-14)
- Directed by: Eri Hao; Ke Zheng Ming (Ep. 1-3)
- Starring: Aaron Yan; Joanne Tseng; Lene Lai; Jack Lee
- Opening theme: "Partner (拍檔)" by Claire Kuo
- Ending theme: "You're The First to Come to Mind (第一個想到你)" by William Wei
- Country of origin: Taiwan
- Original language: Mandarin
- No. of episodes: 17 (Original Release); 28 (Netflix Release)

Production
- Executive producers: Hsu Gui Yíng; Lín Yin Sheng
- Producers: Leung Hon Fai, Xu Zhi Yi (SETTV); Sun Zheng Quan, Pan Yì Qun (TTV)
- Production location: Taiwan
- Running time: 90 minutes
- Production companies: Sanlih E-Television; Eastern Shine Production Co., Ltd.

Original release
- Network: TTV
- Release: March 6 – June 26, 2016

Related
- Bromance; Prince of Wolf

Refresh Man (Chinese: 後菜鳥的燦爛時代; pinyin: hòu cài niǎo de càn làn shí dài; literally "The After-Rookie's Brilliant Era") is a 2016 Taiwanese television series created by Sanlih E-Television, starring Aaron Yan, Joanne Tseng, Lene Lai and Jack Lee as the main cast. Filming began on January 27, 2016 and is filmed as it airs. The drama premiered March 6, 2016 on channel TTV, Sunday nights at 10:00 pm.

== Synopsis ==
A "Refresh Man" is an employee who has no passion for their job. They don't care about their underachieving reputation, as long as they get paid for showing up to work they are fine. They report to work on time only to do personal stuff during working hours and count down to the end of the work day to leave on time.

In high school Zhong Yu Tang (Joanne Tseng) was the overachiever with a bright future ahead of her while Ji Wen Kai (Aaron Yan) was the underachiever with the worst grades out of the entire class. Ten years later the tables have turned when Wen Kai becomes the new CEO of the cosmetic company Yu Tang works for. Yu Tang becomes Wen Kai's personal secretary but on her first full day working for him she realizes she is not up to par being an executive secretary when she fails miserably at every given task. Wen Kai has to call in his longtime assistant Miao Ai Sha (Lene Lai) to help him translate during a business meeting with a foreign account, and because Ai Sha is the only one that can communicate with the foreign account person and read the foreign documents, she gets hired at the cosmetic company.

Due to a misunderstanding and feeling left out by Wen Kai and Ai Sha, Yu Tang asks to resign. However she is forced to stay as an employee with the company for three years due to a contract she signed in order to study overseas the previous year. Seeing that Yu Tang has no passion for her position as his personal secretary, Wen Kai transfer her to the worst performing department in the company, which is sales team 3. The rumors of sales team 3 are so bad that it is said anyone that goes to that department never rises up again. Their work quarters are located in an un-maintained area of the building basement. Whenever they hear footsteps nearby, the entire team pretends to work hard but then goes back to their natural state of doing their own personal matters during working hours.

Yu Tang thinks this is Wen Kai's revenge for her treating him harshly during high school, but the reason Wen Kai transferred her to sales team 3 is because he wants her to make sales team 3 a productive department. Also because Yu Tang's life has always been smooth-sailing, he wants to make her stronger through different obstacles he gives her as he secretly likes her. When sales team 3 loses a longtime key account that keeps their department afloat, Wen Kai gives them a new account to handle and transfer Chen You Rui (JR) from another sales team to team 3. Yu Tang's work life just went from bad to worst because You Rui is a constant flirt who is known to flirt with anyone that is female and he has a history of flirting with Yu Tang. Yu Tang starts bonding with Sales team 3 and realizes that she has taken things for granted. Wen Kai is shown to have had feelings for Yutang ever since high school but has never admitted them. When Ziyu, the head secretary of Xinwei Biomedical technology, starts getting closer to Yutang he confesses his love for her and they start dating. Ziyu is heartbroken and tries to sabotage sales team 3 and Wen Kai to get Yutang by collaborating with Ai Sha and Sales teams 1 and 2.

== Cast ==
=== Main cast ===
- Aaron Yan 炎亞綸 as Ji Wen Kai 紀文凱 – Male age 30

The new CEO of a cosmetic conglomerate, Tian Xi Corporation (天璽集團). In high school, he was nicknamed "duck egg king", because he scored zero in many examinations. He was the worst student in his class. He was often looked down by teachers and made fun of by his classmates because of his under-achievements. Zhong Yu Tang, who was the best student in his class, was put in charge of him by the teachers. However, she treated him harshly for being the worst student in the class but he didn't care because he had a crush on her. Ten years later, he becomes the CEO and Yu Tang has to be his personal secretary.

- Joanne Tseng 曾之喬 as Zhong Yu Tang 鍾雨棠 – Female age 29

She was the most senior secretary at Tian Xi Corporation and was recently promoted as the CEO's personal secretary. All that changed when she found out that her new boss is Ji Wen Kai, her high school classmate whom she had treated harshly. She soon finds out she was not qualified enough to be his personal secretary because she failed to even carry out simple tasks such as getting a lunch that the CEO would like. A misunderstanding at work makes her decide to resign but Wen Kai reminds her that because she signed a long term work contract, she is not allowed to resign. Feeling that she is not passionate enough about her job as a secretary, he transfers her to the worst department in the entire company, which is Sales Team 3.

- Lene Lai 賴琳恩 as Miao Ai Sha 苗愛莎 – Female age 29

Ji Wen Kai's long time assistant who was brought on to Tian Xi because he needed someone who can communicate with a Russian business partner and translate their foreign sales contract. When Zhong Yu Tang asked to resign as the CEO's secretary, she becomes Wen Kai's new personal secretary at Tian Xi. Yu Tang feels inferior to Ai Sha because she seems to do everything better than Yu Tang. However, Ai Sha has developed a one sided love towards Wen Kai when they were working together.

- Jack Lee 李運慶 as Wang Zi Yu 王子譽- Male age 33

The Head Secretary of Xinwei Biotech and an old acquaintance of Zhong Yu Tang from a Secretary gathering in the past.

=== Sales team 3 ===
- Sara Xiu 琇琴 as Meng He 孟和 – Female age 50

The head of sales team 3. She has seniority status at TianXi since she joined the company when it was newly formed and has company stock options. She uses her working hours to do her grocery shopping and pickle vegetable at her work desk.

- Cherry Hsia 夏如芝 as Huang Jia Ying 黃佳茵 – Female age 30

A former high level sales person at TianXi who concentrated less on her career after her marriage and the birth of her son. She is a single mother who divorced her abusive husband and depends on her salary to have sole custody of her son. She spends her work days checking up on her son through a web cam.

- Chang Roy as Zhu Liang Yu 朱亮瑜 – Male age 26

A bookworm who is good at creating reports however he doesn't care about work and instead spends his working hours writing his romance novel that he hopes to publish one day.

- Jenny Huang 黃甄妮 as Jiang Hui Xin 江慧心 – Female age 21

A former customer sales person who request a transfer to the corporate office because she doesn't like to deal with customers. She spends her working hours sleeping and is actually more energized when she get off work.

- JR 紀言愷 as Shen You Rui 沈佑睿 – Male age 32

The office flirt at Tian Xi. He has a habit of flirting with ladies. He has a history with Zhong Yu Tang and tells everybody he is her ex-boyfriend even though the two have never dated before. He is transferred to Sales Team 3 by Wen Kai, who wants them to save an old account and land new sales accounts.

=== Extended main cast ===
- Wang Dao Nan 王道南 as Zhong Kui 鍾奎- Male age 55

Zhong Yu Tang and Zhong Yu Han's father. He owns and manages a small café that mainly sells omurice.

- Andy Ko 葛兆恩 as Zhong Yu Han 鍾雨翰- Male age 25

Zhong Yu Tang's younger brother and Zhong Kui's son. He works alongside his father at the omurice café they own.

- Yin Fu 茵芙 as Wang Hai Di 王海蒂 – Female age 29

Ji Wen Kai and Zhong Yu Tang high school classmate. She is Yu Tang's best friend and claims Wen Kai had a crush on her.

- Stanley Mei 梅賢治 as Cai Sheng Ren 蔡聖仁 – Male age 30

Ji Wen Kai's friend.

- Hsieh Chiung Hsuan 謝瓊煖 as Ai Sha's mother – Female age 55

=== Extended cast ===
- Ting Chiang 丁強 as Shen Yue Feng 沈岳峰
- Lung Shao-hua as Wang Chao Long
- ID Yu 游喧 as Wendy
- Jeniffer Wang 袁天綺 as Amy
- Wang Chi Chiang 王自強 as Uncle Wang
- Cheng Zheng Jun 程政鈞 as Chief Zheng
- Ray Fan 范瑞君 as Yu Tang and Yu Han's mother
- Joseph Ma 馬國賢 as
- Lin Xin Ying 林莘穎 as childhood Yu Tang
- John Chen 陳志強 as Lian Shi Qiang 連士強（Johnny）
- Guan Jin Zong 管謹宗 as Director Cai
- Gina Lim as Director Cai's secretary
- Xue Zi Fei 薛子騛 as Deputy Wu
- Stephenie Lim 林美貞 as Hua Ru Ping 華如萍
- Bi Zhi Gang 畢志綱 as Uncle Li
- Yang Lie 楊烈 as Director Luo
- Zhang Ji Quan 張紀詮 as Xu Yong Cheng 許永承
- Vince Kao 高英軒 as Zhang Zhu Mi 張主秘
- Soso Tseng 曾威豪 as children toys store owner
- Ren Yuan Yuan 任媛媛 as Zhu Mi's companion
- Xu Mou Jun 徐謀俊 as bad boy high school prom
- Zhan Bo Xiang 詹博翔 as bad boy high school prom
- Paul Hsu 許騰方 as Jia Zhong Xian 賈重賢
- Tang Tsung Sheng 唐從聖 as Zhan Shang Yang 詹上陽
- Su An Bang 蘇安邦 as business lesson staff
- Lin Zhe Wei 林震緯 as business lesson staff
- Jian Yi Zhe 簡義哲 as Chief Huang
- Yang Yu Cheng 仰雨澄 as bag saleswoman
- Calvin Lee 地球 as Ah Hui 阿輝
- Tan Qing Pu 譚慶普 as Executive Director Hong

== Soundtrack ==
- Partner (拍檔) by Claire Kuo 郭靜
- You're The First to Come to Mind (第一個想到你) by William Wei 韋禮安
- What's Past is Past (坦然) by Pets Tseng 曾沛慈
- Invent a Game (闖關遊戲) by Fang Wu 吳汶芳
- We (我們) by Jing Wen Tseng 曾靜玟 and Fang Wu 吳汶芳
- Old and New (新的舊的) by Wang Li Ren 王笠人
- I Want To Be A Kid (小人物的大願望) by Pets Tseng 曾沛慈
- This Is Not Love (這不是愛情) by William Wei 韋禮安

== Episode ratings ==
Competing dramas on rival channels airing at the same time slot were:

- SET – Be with Me
- FTV – Tân Nương Giá Đáo, The King of Drama
- ETTV – Thirty Something, Love @ Seventeen
- CTV – Nie Xiaoqian

Air Date	Episode	Average Ratings	Rank
March 6, 2016	1	1.69	1
March 13, 2016	2	1.84	1
March 20, 2016	3	2.22	1
March 27, 2016	4	2.26	1
April 3, 2016	5	2.35	1
April 10, 2016	6	2.59	1
April 17, 2016	7	2.38	1
April 24, 2016	8	2.65	1
May 1, 2016	9	2.42	1
May 8, 2016	10	2.38	1
May 15, 2016	11	2.91	1
May 22, 2016	12	2.85	1
May 29, 2016	13	2.63	1
June 5, 2016	14	2.47	1
June 12, 2016	15	2.44	1
June 19, 2016	16	2.46	1
June 26, 2016	17	2.87	1
Average ratings		2.42	--

== Awards and nominations ==
Year	Ceremony	Category	Nominee	Result
2016	2016 Sanlih Drama Awards	Viewers Choice Drama Award	Refresh Man	Nominated
2016	2016 Sanlih Drama Awards	Best Actor Award	Aaron Yan	Nominated
2016	2016 Sanlih Drama Awards	Best Actress Award	Joanne Tseng	Nominated
2016	2016 Sanlih Drama Awards	Best Kiss Award	Aaron Yan & Joanne Tseng	Nominated
2016	2016 Sanlih Drama Awards	Best Screen Couple Award	Aaron Yan & Joanne Tseng	Nominated
2016	2016 Sanlih Drama Awards	Viewers Choice Drama's Song Award	"You're The First to Come to Mind" - William Wei	Nominated

== International broadcast ==
Country	Channel
United States	Viki
Singapore	E City
Hong Kong	Chinese Drama
Malaysia	Astro Shuang Xing
Thailand	True Asian Series
