= My Queen =

- Promotional poster
- Also known as: Defeated Queen; Queen of No Marriage
- 敗犬女王
- Genre: Romance; Comedy
- Directed by: Ching-Chen Lin
- Starring: Ethan Juan; Cheryl Yang; Sylvia Yang; Lene Lai
- Opening theme: (沒有如果) There's No If by Fish Leong (別再為他流淚) Don't Shed Any More Tears for Him (episode 3,4,7) by Fish Leong
- Ending theme: (愛情之所以為愛情) The Reason For The Love Of Love by Fish Leong
- Country of origin: Taiwan
- Original languages: Mandarin; Taiwanese
- No. of episodes: 21 episodes

Original release
- Network: TTV/Sanlih E-Television
- Release: January 4 – May 31, 2009

Related
- Invincible Shan Bao Mei; Easy Fortune Happy Life; A Witch Romance

My Queen (Chinese: 敗犬女王; pinyin: Bài Quǎn Nǚwáng), also known as Defeated Queen or Queen of No Marriage, is a 2009 Taiwanese romantic-comedy television series. The television drama was produced by Sanlih E-Television starring Ethan Juan and Cheryl Yang. It was first aired on January 4, 2009 on TTV after Invincible Shan Bao Mei and last aired on May 31, 2009.

== Synopsis ==
Shan Wu Shuang (Cheryl Yang), a 33-year-old beautiful, hardworking yet single woman, meets Lucas (Ethan Juan), a 25-year-old romantic and handsome regular worker. There is an 8-year age difference between the two lovers.

== Cast ==
=== Main ===
- Ethan Ruan as Lucas (25 y.o) - Workerman, helper of JJ, sometimes an assistant at iFound magazine and bodyguard of Shan Wu Shuang. He was previously an outstanding medical student, but after the death of Han Xiang-Yun, his girlfriend, his grades dropped and he was expelled from medical school.
- Cheryl Yang as Shan Wu Shuang (33 y.o) - The main editor in iFound magazine's store (social, politics and case department, mid-level chief). She was always top of the class from primary school to university and is hard-working in her jobs. She is single, although she previously had a relationship with Song Yun-Hao and nearly married him, until an accident six years ago caused a misunderstanding between them.
- Sylvia Yang as Han Jia Jia (21 y.o) - A new trainee worker at iFound and the younger sister of Han Xiang-Yun (Lucas' ex-girlfriend).
- James Wen as Song Yun Hao (34 y.o) - A world-famous cameraman and past-boyfriend of Shan Eu Shuang. He once dated Wu Shuang and wanted to marry her, but because of his job, it didn't come about. He had an accident and did not tell Wu Shuang, which destroyed their love.
- Harry Chang as JJ (25 y.o) - Classmate and best friend of Lucas, and manager of the Hot Spring Hotel. He is dating Han Jia-Jia.

=== Supporting ===
- Jessica Song as Lu Guang Lin - Teacher and Ke Menghan's wife.
- Da Bing as Romeo - Senior editor of iFound magazine; single.
- Amanda Chu as Xie Zhiqi - Co-editor of iFound magazine.
- Ying Wei-min as Zhang Ruoji - Photographer for iFound magazine.
- Patrick Lee as Wei Er-Kang - Editor for iFound magazine.
- Peixu Li as Weier Gang - Editor of iFound magazine; attracted to Xie Zhiqi
- Jun Laiting as Madan Na - Reporter for iFound magazine.
- Zhao Zi Qiang (趙自強) as Ceng Dafang - Works for iFound magazine, owns a hotel. He is married to Lin Chunzhi, and they have one child.
- Wei-Min Chen as Ke Menghan - Lu Guanglin's husband. They have a daughter.
- Lin Mei-hsiu as Dan Lin Chunzhi - Single mother; in love with the head of Warriors High School.
- Wang Dao as Lu Tiancheng - Lucas's father; a doctor.

=== Guest appearances ===
- Ko Chia-yen as Han Hsiang-yun - Ex-girlfriend of Lucas; has asthma; accidentally drowned in the sea
- Qu Zhong Heng as Ke You-Zheng - A politician from a small village, and National Party candidate for Prime Minister
- Liu Xiao Li as Ketai Tai - Wife of Ke You and National Party chairman's daughter.
- Chen Bor-jeng as Xu Zimo - Boyfriend of Lin Chunzhi
- Du Shi Mei
- Xiang Yu Jie (also known as Xiang Li Wen) as Lin Laoshi - English teacher at Warriors High School.
- Huang Tai An as a security guard
- Hei Mian as a Jeweller's shop employee
- Ma Li Ou as a TV host - Host of "Cheers" and "Love at 5".
- Junior as Edison - Han Jia Jia's ex-boyfriend. He owns a motorbike company.
- Lene Lai as Lin Mei-Huan - Schoolmate of Lucas in high school.
- Zhuang Zhuang as the vice-chairman of the Da Wei Hotel.
- Fu Tian-ying as Da Tou-ting - University classmate of Shan Wu Shuang.
- Chung Hsin-ling as Da Du-yi - University classmate of Shan Wu Shuang.
- Ehlo Huang as Yue Fei - The doctor who did Wu Shuang's pre-marital health check and is attracted to her.
- Zhang Qin-yan as Chloe - Leslie's helper for many years.
- Ba Yu as Wu Jing-jing - Adviser to Lai Dian
- Zhang Zhao-zhi as Mr. Tang - One of main targets for Shan Wu Shuang
- Sun Peng as the husband of Da Du-yi. He appears in a photo.
- Akio Chen as a manager of an engine store
- Lu Man-yin as Man-yin Jie - Worker in Hot Spring Hotel, which belongs to JJ's family.
- Ye Min-zhi as an editor of U Watch magazine store
- Chen Wei-ling as a flower store worker
- Di Qiu as Xiao Zheng - Classmate of Lucas at school
- Wong JingLun as Xiao Chen - Classmate of Lucas at school
- XuanXuan as A-Rui
- Fish Leong as a radio DJ

== Broadcast ==
Network	Country/location	Airing date	Timeslot	Notes
TTV	Taiwan	January 4, 2009	Sundays, 10pm	Premiere
SETTV	Taiwan	January 10, 2009	Saturdays, 9pm	Cable TV premiere
TTV	Taiwan	January 11, 2009	Sundays, 1pm	Replays
SETTV	Taiwan	January 17, 2009	Sundays, 1:30pm	Replays
SETTV	Taiwan	June 3, 2009	Mondays to Fridays, 8pm	Replays
SETTV	Taiwan	June 4, 2009	Mondays to Fridays, 12am	Replays
SETTV	Taiwan	June 4, 2009	Mondays to Fridays, 1pm	Replays
SETTV	Taiwan	December 23, 2010	Mondays to Fridays, 8pm	Replays
TTV	Taiwan	January 26, 2011	Mondays to Fridays, 10am	Replays
東森戲劇台	Taiwan	December 25, 2011	Saturdays - Sundays, 6pm	Replays
中華電信MOD 044星光偶像HD台	Taiwan	June 11, 2012	Mondays to Fridays, 8-9pm	Replays
TVB J2	Hong Kong	January 17, 2010	Sundays, 8:30pm	Overseas

== Soundtrack ==
My Queen

Soundtrack album by Fish Leong
- Released: May 22, 2009
- Genre: Mandopop
- Language: Mandarin
- Label: Believe In Music

My Queen Original Soundtrack (CD+DVD) (敗犬女王之情歌無雙影音雙冠原聲天作之盒 (1CD+1DVD)) was released on May 22, 2009 by Fish Leong under Believe In Music. It contains seventeen songs, and a DVD version which contains Fish Leong's Fall in Love & Songs album's music video and karaoke. The opening theme song is "No Ifs" or "Ru Guo", while the ending theme song is "The Reason For The Love Of Love".

=== Track listing ===
No.	Title	Length
1.	"No Ifs" (敗犬女王(OT:沒有如果))
2.	"No Ifs (耶誕節的情侶餐 ver.)" (耶誕節的情侶餐 (OT:沒有如果))
3.	"No Ifs (犬樣的人生 ver.)" (犬樣的人生 (OT:沒有如果))
4.	"一個人的人生"
5.	"獨立敗犬"
6.	"The Reason For The Love Of Love (一個人淋雨 ver.)" (一個人淋雨 (OT:愛情之所以為愛情))
7.	"Dare Not (完美單無雙 ver.)" (完美單無雙 (OT:Secretly 不敢當))
8.	"戀愛最後一名"
9.	"No Ifs (不精明女王 ver.)" (不精明女王 (OT:沒有如果))
10.	"等我跌倒…"
11.	"The Reason For The Love Of Love (不能哭!! ver.)" (不能哭!! (OT:愛情之所以為愛情))
12.	"No Ifs (花錢找男人!!?? ver.)" (花錢找男人!!?? (OT:沒有如果))
13.	"No Ifs (只想單純在一起 ver.)" (只想單純在一起 (OT:沒有如果))
14.	"The Reason For The Love Of Love (要條件?要感覺? ver.)" (要條件?要感覺? (OT:愛情之所以為愛情))
15.	"敗犬標籤"
16.	"The Reason For The Love Of Love (面對一個人的感覺 ver.)" (面對一個人的感覺 (OT:愛情之所以為愛情))
17.	"Don't Shed Any More Tears for Him (只要我們在一起 ver.)" (只要我們在一起 (OT:別再為他流淚))

Fall in Love & Songs's music video and karaoke DVD
No.	Title	Length
1.	"Don't Shed Any More Tears for Him"
2.	"No Ifs"
3.	"Hug Tightly"
4.	"PK"
5.	"Love Song"
6.	"Sky Lantern"
7.	"Dare Not"
8.	"The Reason For The Love Of Love"
9.	"Belonging To"
10.	"Find A Person"
11.	"Bagpiper"
12.	"Nursery Rhymes"

== Episode ratings ==
Since its first broadcast, My Queen topped the ranks with the total average of 5.69. Its drama competitors were CTV's Love or Bread, ToGetHer, and Boys Over Flowers, and CTS's Prince + Princess 2 and Knock Knock Loving You. The viewers survey was conducted by AGB Nielsen.

Date	Episode	Ratings	Rank
2009-Jan-04	01	4.03	1
2009-Jan-11	02	4.07	1
2009-Jan-18	03	4.66	1
2009-Feb-01	04	4.59	1
2009-Feb-08	05	5.32	1
2009-Feb-15	06	5.18	1
2009-Feb-22	07	5.34	1
2009-Mar-01	08	5.95	1
2009-Mar-08	09	5.93	1
2009-Mar-15	10	5.94	1
2009-Mar-22	11	5.83	1
2009-Mar-29	12	6.49	1
2009-Apr-05	13	6.63	1
2009-Apr-12	14	5.98	1
2009-Apr-19	15	5.99	1
2009-Apr-26	16	6.62	1
2009-May-03	17	6.59	1
2009-May-10	18	6.24	1
2009-May-17	19	5.56	1
2009-May-24	20	5.29	1
2009-May-31	21	7.35	1
Average		5.69	1

== Remake ==
A South Korean remake titled A Witch's Love aired on tvN in 2014, starring Uhm Jung-hwa and Park Seo-joon.

== Awards and nominations ==
Year	Ceremony	Category	Recipient	Result
2012	47th Golden Bell Awards	Best Television Series	My Queen	Nominated
2012	47th Golden Bell Awards	Best Actress	Cheryl Yang	Nominated
2012	47th Golden Bell Awards	Best Supporting Actor	James Wen	Nominated
2012	47th Golden Bell Awards	Best Drama Program Guide	My Queen	Nominated
2012	47th Golden Bell Awards	Best Program Marketing	My Queen	Nominated
2012	47th Golden Bell Awards	Best Channel Advertising	My Queen	Won
