= I Love You, Period! =

Album by Pets Tseng

- "I Love You, Period!" cover

Studio album 我愛你 以上 by Pets Tseng
- Released: 2 July 2017
- Genre: Mandopop
- Length: 58:35
- Language: Mandarin
- Label: Linfair Records

Pets Tseng chronology
I'm Pets (2014)	I Love You, Period! (2017)	Confession (2019)

Singles from I Love You, Period!
- 1. "Chalk n Doodle (粉筆和塗鴉)" Released: 6 June 2015; 2. "What's Past Is Past (坦然)" Released: 26 November 2015; 3. "No Longer Alone (不再怕寂寞)" Released: 26 January 2016; 4. "I Said Nothing Like That (我才沒有那樣呢)" Released: 18 March 2016; 5. "If We Don't Belong Together (我不是你該愛的那個人)" Released: 28 June 2016; 6. "There Are Tears (我的淚)" Released: 10 November 2016; 7. "I Love You (我愛你)" Released: 18 May 2017; 8. "Love is Paranoia (偏愛)" Released: 1 June 2017; 9. "If You Leave Him At All (你離開他了嗎)" Released: 29 June 2017

I Love You, Period! (Chinese: 我愛你 以上; pinyin: Wǒ ài nǐ Yǐ shàng) is the second studio album by Taiwanese singer Pets Tseng. It was released on 2 July 2017, by Linfair Records. It was the most-streamed album in 2017 on MyMusic, the second leading audio streaming platform in Taiwan.

== Track listing ==
No.	Title	Lyrics	Music	Length
1.	"I Said Nothing Like That" (我才沒有那樣呢; wǒ cái méi yǒu nà yàng ne)	Xiao Lu	Xiao Lu	4:37
2.	"There are Tears" (我的淚; wǒ de lèi)	Lin Yi-hsiu	Lin Yi-hsiu	3:52
3.	"Love is Paranoia" (偏愛; piān ài)	Rao Huibing	Yu Heng	5:06
4.	"Can't Help But Wait" (不認輸的等; bù rèn shū de děng)	Lin Chien-liang	Alex Chang Jien	4:25
5.	"I'd Rather Be Alone Than Be Lied To" (又不是非要你的愛; yòu bù shì fēi yào nǐ de ài)	Lan Xiaoxie; Tank	Tank	4:41
6.	"If We Don't Belong Together" (我不是你該愛的那個人; wǒ bù shì nǐ gāi ài dí nà gè rén)	Huang Ting	Op.dan	4:39
7.	"Things We've Said" (說過; shuō guò)	Cheng Sheng-yuan	Cheng Sheng-yuan	4:24
8.	"Chalk N Doodle" (粉筆和塗鴉; fěn bǐ hé tú yā)	Tangerine Wong	Tangerine Wong	4:36
9.	"If You Leave Him At All" (你離開他了嗎; nǐ lí kāi tā le má)	Percy Phang	Percy Phang	4:21
10.	"Along With Myself" (和自己相遇; hé zì jǐ xiāng yù)	Xiaohan	Klara Yung	4:51
11.	"What's Past Is Past" (坦然; tǎn rán)	Kelly Loh	LGF Seto	4:46
12.	"No Longer Alone" (不再怕寂寞; bù zài pà jì mò)	Shin Yeh	Shin Yeh	3:12
13.	"I Love You" (我愛你; wǒ ài nǐ)	Lin Chung-yu	Lin Chung-yu	4:45

== Music videos ==
Song	Director	Release date	Ref
"If We Don't Belong Together (我不是你該愛的那個人)"	Howard Kuo & Allan Shen	25 August 2016	
"There are Tears (我的淚)"	Howard Kuo & Allan Shen	29 December 2016	
"Love is Paranoia (偏愛)"	JP Huang	31 May 2017	
"If You Leave Him At All (你離開他了嗎)"	Jude Chen	29 June 2017	
"I Love You (我愛你)"	Howard Kuo & Allan Shen	26 July 2017	
