= Joanne Tseng =

Taiwanese actress, singer and TV host

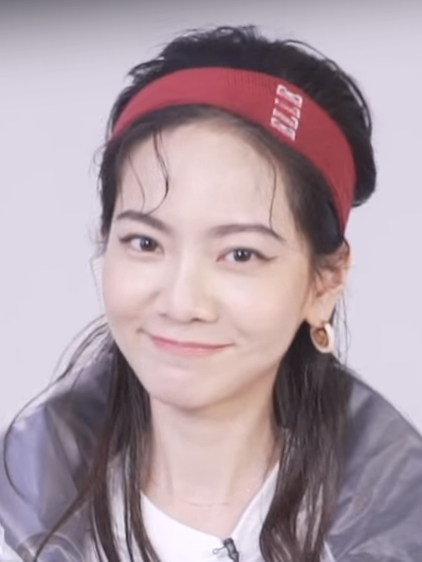
- Tseng in 2019
- Born: 17 November 1988 (age 37); Jianshi, Hsinchu, Taiwan
- Other names: Zeng Zhiqiao; Chiao Chiao (喬喬); Qiao Qiao
- Education: National Taiwan University of Arts
- Occupations: Singer, actress, television host
- Years active: 2002-present
- Spouse: Calvin Chen (m. 2020)
- Musical career
- Labels: Alfa Entertainment; Forward Music; HIM International Music
- Formerly of: Sweety

Chinese name
- Traditional Chinese: 曾之喬
- Simplified Chinese: 曾之乔
Transcriptions
Standard Mandarin
- Hanyu Pinyin: Zēng Zhīqiáo

Joanne Tseng Chih-chiao (Chinese: 曾之喬; born 17 November 1988) is a Taiwanese actress, singer and television host.

== Early life ==
Tseng was born on 17 November 1988 in Jianshi, Hsinchu, Taiwan. She has an older sister, Chih-ying (曾之萦). Both of her parents are teachers.

Her family is part of the Atayal indigenous Taiwanese tribe.

Tseng graduated from the National Taiwan University of Arts with a Drama & Theater degree. She plays the piano, flute, and violin.

== Personal life ==
She announced her marriage to Taiwanese singer Calvin Chen on 23 January 2020, via Instagram. She has been in a relationship with Chen for 10 years.

== Career ==
In 2002, Tseng, along with Esther Liu, formed a Mandopop duo called Sweety, and they debuted in 2003. Tseng and Liu were both only 14 years old when they debuted. Sweety was active from 2003 to 2006 and the duo released 3 studio albums and 2 soundtracks, but the group has been on hiatus since 2007 as a result of Liu starting her studies in Paris, and Tseng focusing on her solo career.

Apart from singing, both members have also acted in film and television series. Since becoming a soloist, Tseng has appeared and starred in numerous television series in both Taiwan and mainland China. She is currently signed under HIM International Music.

In 2017, Tseng relaunched her singing career by releasing her solo debut music video, eleven years after Sweety released their final album.

== Filmography ==
=== Television series ===
Year	English title	Original title	Role	Notes
2004	Top on the Forbidden City	紫禁之巅	Xiao-ying	
2005	Chinese Paladin	仙劍奇俠傳	Xiu-lan	Cameo
2005	Mr. Fighting	格鬥天王	Xiao-kui	
2005	The Doctor	大熊醫師家	Chiao Chiao	Cameo
2006	The Magicians of Love	愛情魔髮師	Bei Ruo-yi / Xiao-bei	
2007	The Sun's Daughter	太陽的女兒	Hu Yang-yue	Cameo
2007	Dreams Link	又見一簾幽夢	Liu Yu-shan	
2007	Mean Girl Ah Chu	惡女阿楚	Yin Chu-chu	
2007	Full Count	愛情，兩好三壞	Su Xiao-xue	
2010	Rogue President	流氓校長	Jiang Qing-mei	
2011	In Time with You	我可能不會愛你	Chen Ping-an	Cameo
2011	Pa Pa PK Show	門當父不對	Chen Li-jun	
2012	Ti Amo Chocolate	愛上巧克力	Hong Xi-en	
2013	True Love 365	求愛365	Zhang Bi-ting	
2013	Our Love	愛的創可貼	Tang Shao-yin	
2014-2015	Dear Mom	我的寶貝四千金	Li Yi-wan	
2015	Be With You	好想談戀愛	Li Yi-wan	Cameo
2015	Love or Spend	戀愛鄰距離	Li Yi-wan	Cameo
2015-2016	Marry Me, or Not?	必娶女人	Amber Hao Sheng-nan	
2016	Refresh Man	後菜鳥的燦爛時代	Zhong Yu-tang	
2017	Attention, Love!	稍息立正我愛你	Chung Shao-hsi	
2019	All Is Well	你那邊怎樣·我這邊OK	Fan Hsiao-ai	
2021	Rainless Love in a Godless Land	無神之地不下雨	Xie Tiandi	

=== Film ===
Year	English title	Original title	Role	Notes
2004	20 30 40	—N/a	Lily's daughter	Cameo
2012	Fox Fairy	狐仙	Ying Ning	
2019	The Last Thieves	聖人大盜	Chen Hsi	

=== Variety show ===
Year	English title	Original title	Network	Notes
2005	Crazy Arcade	阿給大滿貫	Azio TV	Host
2005-2006	Ultimate Victory	齊天大勝	TTV	Host
2006	Game Attack	電玩特攻	Star Chinese Channel	Host
2006-2008	Guess	我猜我猜我猜猜猜	CTV	Stand-in host
2007-2011	Delicious Food All Over the World	美食大三通	SET Metro	Guest host
2011	TVBS Hot News	TVBS哈新聞	TVBS	Guest host
2014	University	大學生了沒	CTi Variety	Stand-in host
2014	iWalker	愛玩客	SET Metro	Guest host

=== Music video appearances ===
Year	Artist	Song title
2004	Queenie Lin	"Too Silly"
2006	Achel Chang	"Now Now"
2012	Abin Fang	"In My Arms"
2014	Calvin Chen	"How Has Love Been"
2016	Power Station	"Only You"

== Discography ==
=== Extended plays ===
Title	Album details	Track listing
Light Up 亮了	Released: September 15, 2017; Label: HIM International Music; Formats: CD, digital download	Track listing: 1. 亮了 Light Up; 2. 上輩子的雙胞胎 Twins In the Past Life (feat. Aaron Yan); 3. 猜猜看 Guess; 4. 幾乎 So Close
A Book Written in Denmark, in Solitude 一個人去丹麥寫一本書	Released: January 15, 2019; Label: HIM International Music; Formats: CD, digital download	Track listing: 1. Intro; 2. 歸零 Reset; 3. 一個人去丹麥寫一本書 A Book Written in Denmark, in Solitude; 4. 親密愛人 Intimate Lover; 5. Surprise!!!!; 6. 世界上最快樂的地方 The Wonderland

== Published works ==
- Tseng, Joanne (2019). Yi ge ren qu dan mai, xie yi ben shu: hei ni wei shen me ni bu yao kuai le 一個人去丹麥,寫一本書: 嘿 你為什麼不要快樂. Taipei: China Times Publishing. ISBN 9789571376677.

== Awards and nominations ==
Year	Award	Category	Nominated work	Result
2015	Sanlih Drama Awards	Best Actress	Dear Mom	Nominated
2015	Sanlih Drama Awards	Best Screen Couple (with Melvin Sia)	Dear Mom	Won
2015	Sanlih Drama Awards	Best Kiss (with Melvin Sia)	Dear Mom	Nominated
2015	Sanlih Drama Awards	Best Selling S-Pop Magazine Award	Dear Mom	Nominated
2016	51st Golden Bell Awards	Best Supporting Actress	Marry Me, or Not?	Nominated
2016	Sanlih Drama Awards	Best Actress	Refresh Man	Nominated
2016	Sanlih Drama Awards	Best Screen Couple (with Aaron Yan)	Refresh Man	Nominated
2016	Sanlih Drama Awards	Best Kiss (with Aaron Yan)	Refresh Man	Nominated
