= Beautiful (Fish Leong album) =

Studio album by Fish Leong

美丽人生 Beautiful

Studio album by Fish Leong
- Released: 12 February 2003
- Genre: Mandarin pop
- Length: 44:31
- Label: Rock Records

Fish Leong chronology
我喜欢; Sunrise (2002)	美丽人生; Beautiful (2003)	恋爱的力量; The Power of Love (2003)

Beautiful (Chinese: 美丽人生) is the fifth studio album of Fish Leong (Chinese: 梁静茹), released on 12 February 2003.

== Track listing ==
1. Beautiful
2. 為我好 Wei Wo Hao (For My Own Good)
3. 第三者 Di San Zhe (The Other Woman)
4. 美麗人生 Mei Li Ren Sheng (Beautiful Life)
5. 我不害怕 Wo Bu Hai Pa (I Don't Fear)
6. 你還在不在 Ni Hai Zai Bu Zai (Are You Still Here)
7. 惡性循環 E Xing Xun Huan (Vicious Cycle)
8. 最快樂那一年 Zui Kuai Le Na Yi Nian (The Most Happy For That Year)
9. 向左轉向右轉 Xiang Zuo Zhuan Xiang You Zhuan (Turn Left Turn Right)
10. 眼淚的地圖 Yan Lei De Di Tu (The Map Of Tears)
11. 旅程 Lu Cheng (Journey)
