= Wings of Love (Fish Leong album) =

Studio album by Fish Leong

燕尾蝶 Wings of Love
- Wings of Love cover

Studio album by Fish Leong
- Released: 9 September 2004
- Genre: Mandopop
- Language: Mandarin
- Label: Rock Records

Fish Leong chronology
The Power of Love 戀愛的力量 (2003)	燕尾蝶; Wings of Love (2004)	Silk Road of Love 絲路 (2005)

Wings of Love (Chinese: 燕尾蝶) is Malaysian Chinese Mandopop artist Fish Leong's (Chinese: 梁靜茹) sixth Mandarin studio album. It was released on 9 September 2004 by Rock Records.

The track "別人的天長地久" (Someone Else's Eternity) is the ending theme of drama Feng Yun II; and "中間" (Middle) is the opening theme of Taiwanese drama Love Contract, starring Ariel Lin and Mike He.

The track "接受" (Accept) was nominated for Top 10 Gold Songs at the Hong Kong TVB8 Awards, presented by television station TVB8, in 2005.

== Track listing ==
1. "寧夏" Níngxià
2. "給從前的愛" Gĕi Cóng Qián de Ài (For the Love of the Past)
3. "燕尾蝶" Yàn Wĕi Dié (Swallow-Tailed Butterfly)
4. "接受" Jiē Shòu (Accept)
5. "我都知道" Wŏ Dōu Zhīdào (I Know)
6. "我是幸福的" Wŏ Shì Xìngfú de (I'm Happiness)
7. "別人的天長地久" Bié Rén de Tiān Cháng Di Jiŭ (Someone Else's Eternity) - ending theme of Feng Yun II
8. "茉莉花" Mòlìhuā (Jasmine)
9. "中間" Zhōng Jiān (Middle) - opening theme of Love Contract
10. "L.I.E."
11. "純真" Chúnzhēn (Innocence)
