= Shining Star (Fish Leong album) =

Studio album by Fish Leong

Studio album by Fish Leong
- Released: 26 June 2001
- Genre: Mandopop
- Label: Rock Records

Fish Leong chronology
Yǒng Qì (2000)	Shining Star (2001)	Sunrise (2002)

Shining Star (Chinese: 闪亮的星) is the third studio album of Fish Leong, released on 26 June 2001 by Rock Records.

== Track listing ==
1. 无条件为你 (Unconditionally for You)
2. 闪亮的星 (The Shining Star)
3. 最想环游的世界 (The World Desired Best to Travel)
4. 明天的微笑 (Smiles of Tomorrow)
5. 在晴朗的一天出发 (Set Out on a Sunny Day)
6. 看海计划 (A Plan to Visit the Sea)
7. 我是爱你的 (I Do love You)
8. 这一天 (我们都健康快乐) (This Day (Wa Are Healthy and Young))
9. 我不快乐 (I'm Not Happy)
10. 这是你吗 (Are You True to Yourself)
11. 为你而:P (Smile for You)
