= Fang Wu =

Fang Wu 吳汶芳
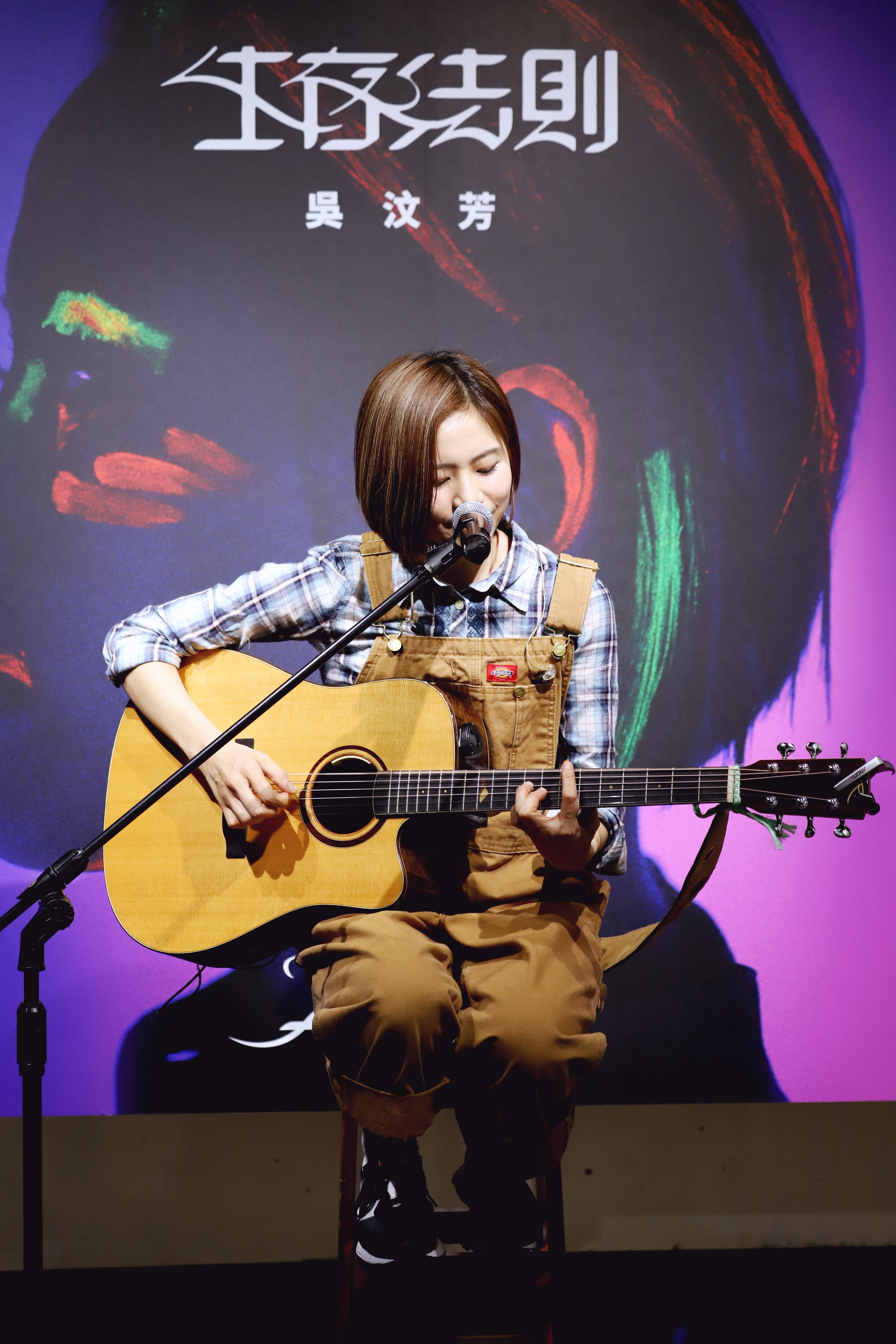

Background information
- Born: Wu Wen Fang; 23 March 1990 (age 35); Kaohsiung, Taiwan
- Genres: Mandopop
- Occupation: Singer-songwriter
- Instruments: Guitar; Electric guitar; Ukulele; Accordion; Piano
- Labels: Linfair Records; Yoosonn Entertainment; (2012-2020); Sense Music Culture (2020-present); Sharp Music (2023-present)
- Website: Fang Wu on Facebook

Fang Wu (Chinese: 吳汶芳; born 23 March 1990) is a Taiwanese female singer-songwriter. Wu has participated in Super Idol and Duets China. She was once the member of the duo, BabyFace and Double 2 Band.

== Career ==
In 2008, she formed a duo with Hsieh Guang Tai and participated in Super Idol Season 2, and got the fifth place. Later, she participated in Super Idol Season 4 and got the sixth place. She was recognized by her sweet voice. In 2011, she formed a band, Double 2, with Eli Hsieh, and released 2 singles which gained support from the netizens.

In 2014, she first performed at Taipei Arena due to her participation in the show, Super Slipper. In 2015, she participated in Duets China and joined team Jason Zhang, and got the third place. At the same year, she released her debut solo studio album,I'm Promising, where the lead single, "Accumulated Loneliness" received positive reviews from the general.

In December 2017, she released her second studio album, Pieces of Me.

In December 2021, her third studio album Still Alive had released. Different from previous works, this is her first self-released album after she left the label of Linfair Records.

== Discography ==
=== Studio albums ===
#	Album Info	Tracklisting
1st	《I'm Promising》: Release Date：3 September 2015; Label: Linfair	Tracklisting: 1. If I Only Had You; 2. Accumulated Loneliness; 3. Message, Ignored; 4. Marathon Girl; 5. Where I Belong; 6. I Got You; 7. Breaking Point; 8. Challenges; 9. Seesaw; 10. Love, Waiting; 11. Playing My Heart Out; 12. See Right Through; 13. Tomorrow Is Another Day
2nd	《Pieces of Me》: Release Date: 30 December 2017; Label: Linfair	Tracklisting: 1. A Drop in the Ocean; 2. Pieces of Me; 3. There'll Be A Day; 4. Guidance; 5. Will Not Look For Me – Supportive Version; 6. Drift Away; 7. Endlessness; 8. Follow Your Heart; 9. Don't Look For Me – 放手解脫 Version; 10. Happiness is an Island; 11. Precious; 12. Missing Star
3rd	《Still Alive》: Release Date: 7 December 2021; Label: Sense	Tracklisting: 1. After Dark; 2. Emotional Blackmail(feat. ?te); 3. Love From Parallel Universe(feat. Edison Song); 4. Offline; 5. Damn it 6. Little Stars; 7. Pessimist; 8. Not My Fault; 9. Still Alive

=== Singles ===
Released Date	Artist(s)	Song	Lyrics	Compose	Note
12 July 2015	Claire Kuo﹑Pets Tseng﹑Fang Wu﹑Jing Wen Tseng	Wild Things	Fei Fei	Fei Fei	「Fun 4 一夏 福茂女朋友」Concert Theme Song
23 September 2015	Jing Wen Tseng﹑Fang Wu	The Moment Belongs To Us	Shadya Lan	Shadya Lan	To the Dearest Intruder Interlude; Refresh Man Interlude
8 December 2015	Fang Wu	Feel It Now	Fang Wu	Fang Wu	露得清洗把臉活動 Theme Song
25 July 2016	Fang Wu	Us Hour	Fang Wu	Fang Wu	Happy Dorm Ending Theme Song
12 December 2017	Fang Wu	Precious	Eli Hsieh	Eli Hsieh	The Florida Project Chinese Promotional Song
29 December 2017	Fang Wu	Missing Star	Fang Wu	Fang Wu	

=== Writing credits ===
Released Date	Artist(s)	Song	Lyrics	Compose	Album	Note
2013	Fang Wu	Where I Belong	Fang Wu	Fang Wu	I'm Promising	The Pursuit of Happiness Soundtrack
2013	Fang Wu	Accumulated Loneliness	Fang Wu	Fang Wu	I'm Promising	The Pursuit of Happiness Soundtrack; My Sunshine Taiwan Ending Theme Song
12 December 2014	Pets Tseng	溫柔撞擊	Fang Wu	Fang Wu	I Am Pets Tseng	Angel 'N' Devil Interlude
7 January 2015	Claire Kuo; Jing Wen Tseng	Let's Go	Fang Wu; Claire Kuo; Jing Wen Tseng	Fang Wu; Jing Wen Tseng		Taste The Word Theme Song
2015	Fang Wu	If I Only Had You	Fang Wu	Fang Wu	I'm Promising	Aries Ending Theme Song
2015	Fang Wu	Message, Ignored	Fang Wu	Fang Wu	I'm Promising	Aquarius Soundtrack
2015	Fang Wu	Marathon Girl	Fang Wu	Fang Wu	I'm Promising	
2015	Fang Wu	I Got You	Fang Wu	Fang Wu	I'm Promising	淺田錠 Advertising Song、Aquarius Interlude
2015	Fang Wu	Breaking Point	Fang Wu	Fang Wu	I'm Promising	Aries Ending Theme Song; Beloved Eun-dong Ending Taiwan Edition Theme Song
2015	Fang Wu	Challenges	Fang Wu	Fang Wu	I'm Promising	Refresh Man
2015	Fang Wu	Seesaw	Fang Wu	Fang Wu	I'm Promising	
2015	Fang Wu	Love, Waiting	Fang Wu	Fang Wu	I'm Promising	Shia Wa Se Taiwan Edition Interlude
2015	Fang Wu	Playing My Heart Out	Fang Wu	Fang Wu	I'm Promising	Taichung Bank Advertising Song
2015	Fang Wu	See Right Through	Fang Wu	Fang Wu	I'm Promising	
2015	Fang Wu	Tomorrow Is Another Day	Fang Wu	Fang Wu	I'm Promising	Pisces Ending Theme Song
2015	Fang Wu	Feel It Now	Fang Wu	Fang Wu		Neutrogena洗把臉活動 Theme Song
2016	Fang Wu	The Moment Belongs To Us	Fang Wu	Fang Wu		Happy Dorm Ending Theme Song
2017	Fang Wu	A Drop in the Ocean	Fang Wu	Fang Wu	Pieces of Me	
2017	Fang Wu	Pieces of Me	Fang Wu	Fang Wu	Pieces of Me	
2017	Fang Wu	Guidance	Fang Wu	Fang Wu	Pieces of Me	
2017	Fang Wu	Will Not Look For Me (Supportive Version/放手解脫版)	Fang Wu	Fang Wu	Pieces of Me	
2017	Fang Wu	Drift Away	Fang Wu	Fang Wu	Pieces of Me	
2017	Fang Wu	Endlessness	Fang Wu	Fang Wu	Pieces of Me	My Dear Boy Interlude; While You Were Sleeping Taiwan Edition Theme Song; Unkwown Woman Taiwan Edition Ending Theme Song
2017	Fang Wu	Follow Your Heart	Fang Wu	Fang Wu	Pieces of Me	Tsaio Advertising Song
2017	Fang Wu	There'll Be A Day	Fang Wu	Fang Wu	Pieces of Me	
2017	Fang Wu	Happiness Is An Island	Fang Wu	Fang Wu;Suming	Pieces of Me	
2017	Fang Wu	Missing Star	Fang Wu	Fang Wu	Pieces of Me	
2019	Fang Wu	Necessary Evil	Fang Wu; Fei Fei	Fang Wu		Without her soundtrack
2019	Fang Wu	同棲	Fang Wu、Jan Lin、Janus、Jumbo	Fang Wu、Jan Lin、Janus、Jumbo		GENERATION Z soundtrack
2019	Fang Wu	願聞其詳	Fang Wu	Fang Wu		Before We Get Married soundtrack
2019	Fang Wu	愛與被愛	Fang Wu	Fang Wu		
2019	Janice Vidal	Holy Workout Song	陳詠謙	Jhen F、Lee Jong-Myoung、Fang Wu、Midi Yang	In His Name	
2020	Jer Lau	水刑物語	Siu Hak	YNot、Fang Wu、蔡欣弦		
2020	Fang Wu	Memory of an Elephant	Fang Wu	Fang Wu		Wacko of Law soundtrack
2021	Fang Wu	Thinking about you	Fang Wu	Fang Wu		The Arc of Life soundtrack
2021	Fang Wu	Not My Fault	Fang Wu	Fang Wu	Still Alive	
2021	Fang Wu	Damn it	Fang Wu、S.M.H	Fang Wu、S.M.H	Still Alive	
2021	Fang Wu	Offline	Janus	Fang Wu、Ping Hsu	Still Alive	
2021	Fang Wu	Little Stars	Fang Wu	Fang Wu、Eli Hsieh、YNot	Still Alive	
2021	Fang Wu	After Dark	Fang Wu	Fang Wu、LNiCH	Still Alive	
2021	Fang Wu、 ?te	Emotional Blackmail	Janus、Fang Wu	Fang Wu、?te、The Crane	Still Alive	
2021	Fang Wu、Edison Song	Love fro Parallel Universe	Fang Wu	Fang Wu	Still Alive	
2021	Fang Wu	Pessimist	Fang Wu	Fang Wu	Still Alive	
2021	Fang Wu	Still Alive	Fang Wu	Fang Wu	Still Alive	

=== Double 2 Band ===
==== Singles ====
Released Date	Song	Lyrics	Compose
2011	零距離	Fang Wu	Fang Wu;Chou I-tun(Guitar)
2011	安全感	Fang Wu	Fang Wu

== Concerts/Tours ==
=== Precious Live Tour ===
==== Shows ====
Date	City	Country	Venues	Guest	Attendance	Revenue
2017/11/26	Taipei	Taiwan	IN OUR TIME	—N/a	—N/a	—N/a
2017/12/03	Taichung	Taiwan	Forro Cafe	—N/a	—N/a	—N/a
2017/12/10	Taipei	Taiwan	Legacy mini @amba	—N/a	—N/a	—N/a
2017/12/17	Taoyuan	Taiwan	ThERE CAFE & LIVE HOUsE	—N/a	—N/a	—N/a

== Awards and nominations ==
=== The Association of Music Workers in Taiwan ===
Year	Award	Work	Result	Ref
2016	Top 10 Songs	Accumulated Loneliness	Won	
2018	Top 10 Songs	There'll Be A Day	Won	

=== Global Chinese Golden Chart Awards ===
Year	Award	Work	Result	Ref
2016	Best New Artist	Herself	Silver Award	

=== HITO Music Awards ===
Year	Award	Work	Result	Ref
2016	HITO Rising Female Singer-songwriter	Herself	Won	
2018	Rising Female Artist	Herself	Won	

=== KKBOX Music Awards ===
Year	Award	Work	Result	Ref
2016	Best New Artist	Herself	Won	

=== MusicRadio Chinese Top Chart Music Awards ===
Year	Award	Work	Result	Ref
2015	New Artist of the Year	Herself	Won	
2015	Songs of the Year in Hong Kong and Taiwan Region	Accumulated Loneliness	Won	
