= Sunrise (Fish Leong album) =

Studio album by Fish Leong

我喜歡 Sunrise

Studio album by Fish Leong
- Released: 7 February 2002
- Genre: Mandarin pop
- Label: Rock Records

Fish Leong chronology
闪亮的星; Shining Star (2001)	我喜歡; Sunrise (2002)	美麗人生; Beautiful (2003)

Sunrise (Chinese: 我喜欢) is the fourth studio album by Fish Leong (梁静茹), released on 7 February 2002.

== Track listing ==
1. Sunrise
2. 分手快樂 (Happy Breakup)
3. 我喜歡 Wo Xi Huan (I Like)
4. 有你在 (Have you)
5. 我和自己的约会 (I and my date)
6. 幸福的预感 (A feeling of happiness)
7. 喜悅 (Joy)
8. 怎么說 (How to say)
9. 小小的爱情 (A little love)
10. 无解 (No solution)
11. 分手快樂（合唱版） (Happy Breakup - Chorus version)
