= Silkroad of Love =

Studio album by Fish Leong

- Silkroad of Love cover

Studio album 絲路 by Fish Leong
- Released: 16 September 2005
- Genre: Mandopop
- Language: Mandarin
- Label: Rock Records

Fish Leong chronology
Wings of Love (2004)	Silkroad of Love (2005)	Kissing the Future of Love (2006)

Silkroad of Love (simplified Chinese: 丝路; traditional Chinese: 絲路) is Malaysian Chinese Mandopop artist Fish Leong's (Chinese: 梁靜茹) seventh Mandarin studio album. It was released on 16 September 2005 by Rock Records.

The track "絲路" (Silk Road), written by Leehom Wang and Mayday vocalist, Ashin was nominated for Top 10 Gold Songs at the Hong Kong TVB8 Awards, presented by television station TVB8, in 2005. The track "可惜不是你" (Sadly, It's Not You) was also nominated for Top 10 Gold Songs at the Hong Kong TVB8 Awards in 2006.

== Track listing ==
1. "絲路" Si Lu (Silk Road)
2. "我還記得" Wo Hai Ji De (I Still Remember)
3. "瘦瘦的" Shou Shou De (Lean)
4. "路" Lu (Road)
5. "一對一" Yi Dui Yi (One to One)
6. "可惜不是你" Ke Xi Bu Shi Ni (Sadly, It's Not You)
7. "下一秒鐘" Xia Yi Miao Zhong (Next Second)
8. "很久以後" Hen Jiu Yi Hou (A Long Time Later)
9. "因為還是會" Yin Wei Hai Shi Hui (Because I'd Still)
10. "好夜晚 Good Night" Hao Ye Wan (Good Night)
