= Esther Liu =

Taiwanese actress, singer and television host (born 1988)

- Born: 8 August 1988 (age 38); Taipei, Taiwan
- Other name: Liu Pin-yan
- Education: Mod'art International
- Occupations: Actress, singer, television host
- Years active: 2003—present
- Spouse: Simon Lian (m. 2025)

Chinese name
- Traditional Chinese: 劉品言
- Simplified Chinese: 刘品言
- Hanyu Pinyin: Liú Pǐnyán
- Musical career
- Genre: Mandopop
- Instrument: Vocals
- Label: Seed Music (2015-present)
- Formerly of: Sweety

Esther Liu (born 8 August 1988) is a Taiwanese actress, singer and television host.

Liu began her career at the age of 14 as part of the girl group Sweety with Joanne Tseng. In 2003, Liu made her acting debut in the television series Westside Story alongside Tony Sun and Wallace Huo. Since then, she has starred in several drama series including Chinese Paladin (2005), Green Forest, My Home (2005), The Concerto (2009), Falling (2013), Thirty Something (2015) and Light the Night (2021).

== Filmography ==
=== Television series ===
Year	English title	Original title	Role	Notes
2003	Westside Story	西街少年	Lan Yu-li	
2005	Chinese Paladin	仙劍奇俠傳	A-nu	
2005	Mr. Fighting	格鬥天王	Yeh You-li	
2005	The Doctor	大熊醫師家	Yan-yan	Episode 9
2005	Green Forest, My Home	綠光森林	Sophie	
2007	Liao Zhai 2	聊齋2之粉蝶	Fen Die	
2009	The Concerto	協奏曲	Kao Ling	
2011	Way Back into Love	愛。回來	Hsueh Ya-hsin	Cameo
2012	Falling	含苞欲墜的每一天	Jill	
2013	Love For All The Moments	愛情ATM	Cheng Hsin-ju	Alternative title: Love For A.T.M
2015	Bitter Sweet	軍官·情人	Wang Shang-min	
2015	Thirty Something	我的30定律	Fang Wen-hui	
2017	Family Time	酸甜之味	Tseng Ya-ping	Cameo
2017	Wake Up 2	麻醉風暴2	Shih Pei-hsuan	
2017	Art in Love	那刻的怦然心動	Chung Yu	
2021	Light the Night	華燈初上	Li Shu-hua	

=== Film ===
Year	English title	Original title	Role	Notes
2008	Winds of September	九降風	Hsieh Meng-lun	Cameo
2011	Night Market Hero	雞排英雄	Lin Mei-hsiang	
2012	Din Tao: Leader of the Parade	陣頭	Hsiao-bi	
2012	The Golden Child	金孫	Juan Chin-chih	Television
2016	22nd Catch	22個男人	Annie	
2022	My Best Friend's Breakfast	我吃了那男孩一整年的早餐	Sun Li-qing	Special appearance
2024	Salli	莎莉	Huijun/Salli	
2025	Girl	女孩		

=== Variety show ===
Year	English title	Original title	Notes
2003	100% Entertainment	娛樂百分百	Stand-in host
2005	Crazy Arcade	阿給大滿冠	Host
2005-2006	Ultimate Victory	齊天大勝	Host
2006	Game Attack	電玩特攻	Host
2006, 2007, 2010	Guess	我猜我猜我猜猜猜	Stand-in host
2013	Saturday Challenge	周六大挑戰	Host

=== Music video appearances ===
Year	Artist	Song title
2002	Where Chou	"Just Be Friends"
2004	Queenie Lin	"Butterfly Lovers"
2009	Tiger Hu	"No Regrets"

== Theater ==
Year	English title	Original title
2010-2011	Notice from a Bachelorette	徵婚啟事-浪漫版
2012	Wedding Memories	女兒紅-深情版
2012-2013	Staying-up	守歲

== Discography ==
=== Studio albums ===
Title	Album details	Track listing
Résurrection 重生	Released: March 28, 2015; Label: Seed Music; Formats: CD, digital download	Track listing: 1. 重生 Résurrection; 2. 謝謝我的我 Thank of Myself; 3. 我們都沒錯 There's Nothing Wrong with Us; 4. Sista; 5. 大男人大女人 Male Chauvinist, Female Chauvinist (feat. Shone An); 6. 女王 Empress; 7. Fighting Girls; 8. 幸福是種天份 Happiness Is a Kind of Gifted; 9. 說好以後 Talk in Future; 10. 親愛的晚安 Goodnight, My Dear

== Published works ==
- Liu, Esther (2009). Paris, Le temps qui compte. Xindian District: Harlem Culture. ISBN 9789868553644.
- Esther Liu, Michael Ou (2012). Ginza: The Battlefield of Gourmet. New Taipei City: Harlem Culture. ISBN 9789868769472.

== Awards and nominations ==
Year	Award	Category	Nominated work	Result
2012	47th Golden Bell Awards	Best Leading Actress in a Miniseries or Television Film	The Golden Child	Nominated
2013	48th Golden Bell Awards	Best Supporting Actress in a Television Series	Falling	Won
2022	57th Golden Bell Awards	Best Supporting Actress in a Television Series	Light the Night	Nominated
