= Ai Jiu Jian Renxin =

2012 studio album by Fish Leong

Ài jiǔ jiàn rénxīn

Studio album 愛久見人心 by Fish Leong
- Released: 10 August 2012
- Genre: Mandopop
- Language: Mandarin
- Label: Universal

Fish Leong chronology
| I Love You Hereafter (2011) | Ài jiǔ jiàn rénxīn (2012) | The Sun Also Rises (2019) |

Ài jiǔ jiàn rénxīn "Love Reveals in the Long Run" (simplified Chinese: 爱久见人心; traditional Chinese: 愛久見人心) is the 12th studio album by Fish Leong. It was released on 10 August 2012 by Universal Music Taiwan.

== Track listing ==
| No. | Title | Pinyin title | Length |
|---|---|---|---|
| 1. | "Love Reveals in the Long Run" (愛久見人心) | Ai Jiu Jian Ren Xin | 4:55 |
| 2. | "Small Love" (小愛情) | Xiao Ai Qing | 4:16 |
| 3. | "Occasional Showers" (偶陣雨) | Ou Zhen Yu | 4:28 |
| 4. | "Will Be The Past" (會過去的) | Hui Guo Qu De | 4:26 |
| 5. | "At Least Love" (至少愛) | Zhi Shao Ai | 4:23 |
| 6. | "Has Been Two Persons" (一路兩個人) | Yi Lu Liang Ge Ren | 4:33 |
| 7. | "No One Look Just Like You" (沒有人像你) | Mei You Ren Xiang Ni | 5:37 |
| 8. | "She" (她) | Ta | 4:07 |
| 9. | "Bonjour!" | | 4:19 |
| 10. | "Telepathy" (心電感應) | Xin Dian Gan Ying | 3:51 |
| 11. | "Around The Four Seasons Of Love" (環遊四季的愛) | Huan You Si Ji De Ai | 3:52 |
