= The Power of Love (Fish Leong album) =

The Power of Love (New + Best Collection)
- The Power of Love (New + Best Collection) cover

Compilation album 戀愛的力量 by Fish Leong
- Released: 26 November 2003
- Genre: Mandopop
- Language: Mandarin
- Label: Rock Records

Fish Leong chronology
Beautiful (2003)	The Power of Love (New + Best Collection) (2003)	Wings of Love (2004)

The Power of Love (New + Best Collection) (traditional Chinese: 戀愛的力量; simplified Chinese: 恋爱的力量; pinyin: Liàn’aì de Lìliang) is Malaysian Mandopop artist Fish Leong's (Chinese: 梁靜茹) first compilation album. It was released on 26 November 2003 by Rock Records in a 2CD format.

The album contains five new and 15 previously released tracks. New track "聽不到" (Cannot Hear) is co-composed by Leong and Ashin, lead vocalist of the Taiwanese rock band Mayday.

The track, "聽不到" (Cannot Hear) won one of the Top 10 Songs of the Year and Longest Number 1 Single at the 2005 HITO Radio Music Awards presented by Taiwanese radio station Hit FM.

== Track listing ==
Disc 1 - new tracks in bold

1. **"Fly Away"**
2. **"聽不到" (Cannot Hear)**
3. **"Tiffany"**
4. **"愛是..." (Love is ...)**
5. "一夜長大" (Grown Up Overnight)
6. "勇氣" (Courage)
7. "無條件為你" (All For You)
8. "分手快樂" (Happy Breakup)
9. "我喜歡" (I Like)
10. "為我好" (Good For Me)

Disc 2 - new tracks in bold

1. **"不想睡" (Don't Want To Sleep)**
2. "如果有一天" (If One Day)
3. "彩虹" (Rainbow)
4. "愛你不是兩三天" (Love You More Than a Day)
5. "最想環遊的世界" (Want To Go Around the World)
6. "對不起我愛你" (Sorry to Love You)
7. "只能抱著你" (Want to Hold You)
8. "第三者" (Third Person)
9. "昨天" (Yesterday)
10. "明日的微笑" (Tomorrow's Smile)
