= Kissing the Future of Love =

Studio album by Fish Leong

Studio album 親親 by Fish Leong
- Released: 6 October 2006
- Genre: Mandopop
- Language: Mandarin
- Label: B'in Music

Fish Leong chronology
Silk Road of Love (2005)	Kissing the Future of Love (2006)	j'Adore (2007)

Kissing the Future of Love (traditional Chinese: 親親; simplified Chinese: 亲亲; lit. 'kiss kiss') is Malaysian Chinese Mandopop artist Fish Leong's (Chinese: 梁靜茹) eighth Mandarin studio album. It was released on 6 October 2006 by Rock Records and B'in Music. Taiwanese singer and songwriter, Jay Chou from JVR Music writes her song, "Amnesia" for the first time during his successful of his album Still Fantasy.

== Track listing ==
1. "四季" Si Ji (Four Seasons)
2. "暖暖" Nuan Nuan (Warm)
3. "可樂戒指" Ke Le Jie Zhi (Cola Ring)
4. "失憶" Shi Yi (Amnesia) (Writer: Jay Chou)
5. "親親" Qin Qin (Kisses)
6. "幸福洋果子店" Xing Fu Yang Guo Zi Dian (Bakery of Happiness)
7. "小手拉大手" Xiao Shou La Da Shou (Small Hands Hold Big Hands)- cover of Ayano Tsuji's Kaze ni naru from The Cat Returns
8. "飛魚" Fei Yu (Flying Fish)
9. "不是我不明白" Bu Shi Wo Bu Ming Bai (Not That I Don't Understand)
10. "小心眼" Xiao Xin Yan (Jealousy)
11. "憨過頭" Gōng Kòe Thâu (Too Stupid) - sung in Hokkien
12. "序" Xu (Prologue)
