= Grown Up Overnight =

Studio album by Fish Leong

- Grown Up Overnight cover

Studio album by Fish Leong
- Released: 17 September 1999
- Genre: Mandopop
- Language: Mandarin
- Label: Rock Records

Fish Leong chronology
Grown Up Overnight (1999)	Courage (2000)

Grown Up Overnight (simplified Chinese: 一夜长大; traditional Chinese: 一夜長大; pinyin: Yí Yè Zhǎng Dà) is Malaysian Chinese Mandopop artist Fish Leong's debut studio album. It was released on 17 September 1999 by Rock Records.

== Track listing ==
1. "對不起我愛你" Dui Bu Qi, Wo Ai Ni (Sorry, I Love You)
2. "一夜長大" Yi Ye Zhang Da (Growing Up)
3. "彩虹" Cai Hong (Rainbow)
4. "迷路" Mi Lu (Lost)
5. "快樂一整天" Kuai Le Yi Zheng Tian (Happy for the Day)
6. "只能抱著妳" Zhi Neng Bao Zhe Ni (I Could Only Embrace You)
7. "轉圏圏" Zhuan Quan Quan (Go Round and Round)
8. "純情豔陽天" Chun Qing Yan Yang Tian (Those Innocent Sunny Days)
9. "橡皮筋" Xiang Pi Jin (Rubber Band)
10. "紙條" Zhi Tiao (A Slip of Paper)
