= Courage (Fish Leong album) =

Studio album by Fish Leong

- Courage cover

Studio album by Fish Leong
- Released: 2 August 2000
- Genre: Mandopop
- Language: Mandarin
- Label: Rock Records

Fish Leong chronology
Grown Up Overnight (1999)	Courage (2000)	Shining Star (2001)

Courage (traditional Chinese: 勇氣; simplified Chinese: 勇气; pinyin: Yǒng Qì) is Malaysian Chinese Mandopop artist Fish Leong's second studio album. It was released on 2 August 2000 by Rock Records.

The tracks "If There Was A Day" and "Courage" are listed at number 9 and 47 respectively on Hit FM Taiwan's Annual Top 100 Singles Chart for 2000.

== Track listing ==
1. "勇氣" Yong Qi (Courage)
2. "如果有一天" Ru Guo You Yi Tian (If There Was A Day)
3. "半個月亮" Ban Ge Yue Liang (Half A Moon)
4. "沒有水的游泳池" Mei You Shui De You Yong Chi (A Pool Without Water)
5. "最爛的理由" Zui Lan De Li You (The Worst Excuse)
6. "愛你不是兩三天" Ai Ni Bu Shi Liang San Tian (Loving You Isn't Just Three Days)
7. "愛計較" Ai Ji Jiao (Care About Love)
8. "昨天" Zuo Tian (Yesterday)
9. "多数是晴天" Duo Shu De Qing Tian (Mostly Sunny)
10. "最后" Zui Hou (Finally)
