= Fall in Love & Songs =

2009 studio album by Fish Leong

- Fall in Love & Songs cover

Studio album 靜茹＆情歌-別再為他流淚 by Fish Leong
- Released: 16 January 2009
- Genre: Mandopop
- Language: Mandarin
- Label: B'in Music

Fish Leong chronology
j'Adore (2007)	Fall in Love & Songs (2009)	What Love Songs Didn't Tell You (2010)

Fall in Love & Songs (simplified Chinese: 静茹＆情歌-别再为他流泪; traditional Chinese: 靜茹＆情歌-別再為他流淚) is the tenth studio album by Fish Leong. It was released on 16 January 2009 by B'in Music.

According to Taiwan's G-Music chart the album is the fifth best selling album in Taiwan in 2009.

== Album ==
The album includes "Don't Shed Any More Tears for Him" (track 1), TTV idol drama My Queen's theme song "There's No If" (track 2), which is a Chinese translated version of Thelma Aoyama's "Soba ni Iru ne", and TVBS drama I Do? theme song "Belonging to" (track 9). "PK" (track 4) is a duet with fellow Malaysian singer-songwriter Gary Chaw from Rock Records. The limited deluxe edition of this album is packaged in a gift box with four posters and a bonus CD with duets with Leo Ku, who previously played in Chinese drama Romance in the Rain with Zhao Wei, as well with Crowd Lu and Victor Wong.

== Track listing ==
Disc one
No.	Title	Pinyin title	Length
1.	"Don't Shed Any More Tears for Him" (別再為他流淚)	Bie Zai Wei Ta Liu Lei	3:59
2.	"No If" (沒有如果)	Mei You Ru Guo	4:26
3.	"Hug Tightly" (用力抱著)	Yong Li Bao Zhe	4:32
4.	"PK" (Feat. Gary Chaw)		3:40
5.	"Love Song" (情歌)	Qing Ge	4:20
6.	"Sky Lantern" (天燈)	Tian Deng	4:01
7.	"Dare Not" (不敢當)	Bu Gan Dang	4:12
8.	"The Reason for the Love Of Love" (愛情之所以為愛情)	Ai Qing Zhi Suo Yi Wei Ai Qing	4:19
9.	"Belonging to" (屬於)	Shu Yu	4:06
10.	"Find a Person" (找個人)	Zhao Ge Ren	3:38
11.	"Bagpiper" (風笛手)	Feng Di Shou	3:24
12.	"Lullaby" (兒歌)	Er Ge	4:33

Bonus CD
No.	Title	Pinyin title	Length
1.	"Belonging To" (屬於)	Shu Yu	4:07
2.	"PK" (feat. Gary Chaw)		3:42
3.	"Still Good Friends" (還是好朋友, feat. Leo Ku)	Hai Shi Hao Peng You	4:06
4.	"It's Not That I Don't Understand" (不是我不明白, feat. Crowd Lu)	Bu Shi Wo Bu Ming Bai	4:41
5.	"Way Back into Love" (Feat. Victor Wang)		4:35
