= J'Adore (album) =

Studio album by Fish Leong

- j'Adore cover

Studio album 崇拜 by Fish Leong
- Released: 9 November 2007
- Genre: Mandopop
- Language: Mandarin
- Label: Rock Records, B'in Music

Fish Leong chronology
Kissing The Future of Love 親親 (2006)	J'Adore (2007)	Fall in Love & Songs 靜茹＆情歌-別再為他流淚 (2009)

Chóngbài, known in English as "J'adore" (Chinese: 崇拜) is Malaysian Chinese Mandopop artist Fish Leong's (Chinese: 梁靜茹) ninth Mandarin studio album. It was released by Rock Records and B'in Music on 9 November 2007. It is particularly noted for its wide variety of styles of music, with French and Cantonese influences. This album has already sold over 100 thousand copies in Taiwan alone and over 1 million copies all over the Asia region.

The title track, "崇拜" (Admiration) won one of the Top 10 Songs of the Year at the 2008 HITO Radio Music Awards presented by Taiwanese radio station Hit FM.

== Track listing ==
1. "崇拜" Chong Bai (Admiration)
2. "C'est la vie"
3. "每天第一件事" Mei Tian Di Yi Jian Shi (First Thing In The Morning)
4. "會呼吸的痛" Hui Hu Xi De Tong (Pain That Breathes)
5. "101"
6. "一秒的天堂" Yi Miao De Tian Tang (A Second In Heaven)
7. "給未來的自己" Gei Wei Lai De Zi Ji (To My Future Self)
8. "知多少" Zhi Duo Shao (How Do I Know?)
9. "生命中不可承受的輕" Sheng Ming Zhong Bu Ke Cheng Shou De Qing (The Unbearable Lightness of Being)
10. "三吋日光" San Cun Ri Guang (Three Inches of Sunlight)
11. "原來你也唱過我的歌" Yun Loi Nei Yaa Cheung Gwo Ngo Dik Go (So you also sang my song) - sung in Cantonese
