= Fish Leong =

Malaysian singer

- 梁静茹
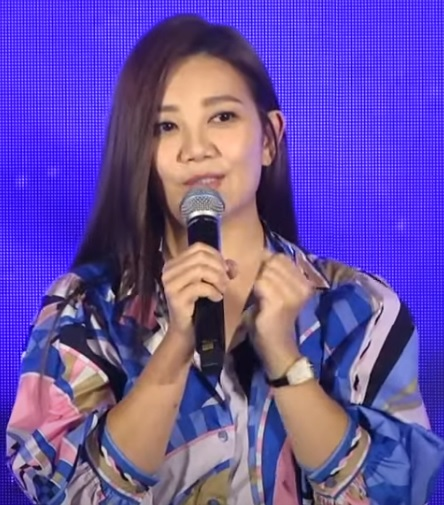
- Leong in 2022
- Born: Leong Chui Peng; 16 June 1978 (age 48); Bahau, Negeri Sembilan, Malaysia
- Other names: Liang Jingru; Liang Cuiping; Jasmine Leong
- Occupations: Singer, actress
- Years active: 1999–present
- Partner: Tony Chao (m. 2010; div. 2019)
- Children: 1
- Relatives: Z-Chen (cousin)
- Musical career
- Origin: Malaysia
- Genres: Mandopop
- Instrument: Vocals
- Labels: Rock; B'in; Universal; Sam's

Chinese name
- Traditional Chinese: 梁靜茹
- Simplified Chinese: 梁静茹
- Hanyu Pinyin: Liáng Jìngrú
- Jyutping: Loeng4 Zing6 Jyu4
- Hokkien POJ: Niô͘ Chēng-jú

Birth name
- Traditional Chinese: 梁翠萍
- Simplified Chinese: 梁翠萍
- Hanyu Pinyin: Liáng Cuìpíng
- Jyutping: Loeng4 Ceoi3 Ping4
- Hokkien POJ: Niô͘ Chhùi-pêng

Fish Leong Ching Yu (simplified Chinese: 梁静茹; traditional Chinese: 梁靜茹, born Leong Chui Peng Chinese: 梁翠萍 on 16 June 1978) is a Malaysian singer and actress. Having sold more than 20 million records to date, she has achieved popularity and success in China, Hong Kong, Taiwan, Japan, Singapore, and Malaysia.

== Early life and breakthrough ==
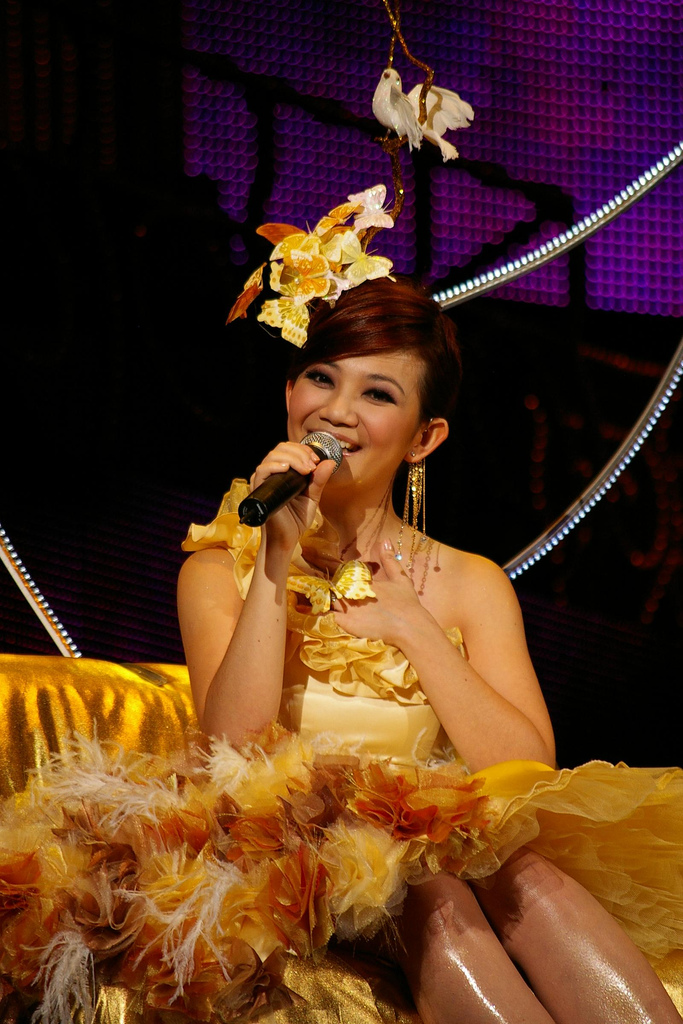
Leong in Hong Kong, 2007

Leong was born in Bahau, Negeri Sembilan, Malaysia. R&B singer Z-Chen is her older cousin. She debuted her singing career in Taiwan and signed to Rock Records in October 1997. She then adopted the English name "Fish", because the last character of her Chinese name "茹" sounds the same as "魚" (fish) in Cantonese. She was discovered by Jonathan Lee, who later also became her godfather. She received Mandarin training upon arriving in Taiwan as her mother tongue is Cantonese. Her debut album, Grown Up Overnight, was released in September 1999, but had many promotions cancelled due to the 1999 Taiwan earthquake. Her singing career managed to take off after the release of her second album, Courage (2000).

== Personal life ==
In February 2010, Leong married Taiwanese wine merchant Tony Chao in Boracay, Philippines, and their child Anderson Chao was born in April 2014. On September 8, 2019, Leong announced their divorce at a press conference for her new album in Taipei. She declined further comments on alleged cheating by Chao.

Shortly after her divorce, Leong briefly dated Taiwanese entrepreneur Darwin Lin, but that relationship concluded by early 2020.

Leong collaborated with singer Eve Ai on a remake of the song “Piao Yang Guo Hai Lai Kan Ni” (“Sea You Soon”), which was used in a campaign advocating the legalization of same-sex marriages for transnational couples in Taiwan.

In an October 2021 mental health forum hosted by a Malaysian NGO, Leong spoke candidly about the mental health challenges she faced during the pandemic and shared the coping strategies she adopted. One method was establishing a daily routine with her young son: she would have him wake up at 8 A.M. to “sit in the sunshine” by the window to draw or read, joking that they would behave like plants basking in sunlight.

== Discography ==
=== Studio albums ===
- Grown Up Overnight (1999)
- Courage (2000)
- Shining Star (2001)
- Sunrise (2002)
- Beautiful (2003)
- Wings of Love (2004)
- Silkroad of Love (2005)
- Kissing the Future of Love (2006)
- J'Adore (2007)
- Fall in Love & Songs (2009)
- What Love Songs Didn't Tell You (2010)
- Love in Heart (2012)
- The Sun Also Rises (2019)
- The Wonder of Wandering Life (2023)

== Filmography ==
=== Film ===
Year	English title	Original title	Role	Notes
2010	Ice Kacang Puppy Love	初恋红豆冰	Ma Libing (Barley Bing or Iced Barley)	
2015	Where's the Dragon?	龙在哪里?	Cow	Voice role

=== Television series ===
Year	English title	Original title	Role	Notes
2009	My Queen	敗犬女王	Radio DJ	Guest appearance

=== Variety and reality show ===
Year	English title	Original title	Notes
2022	Sing! China	中國好聲音	Mentor
