= Singapore Hit Awards 2007 =

The Singapore Hit Awards 2007 (Chinese: 新加坡金曲奖 2007) is a music award organised by Y.E.S. 93.3FM in association with the Recording Industry Association Singapore.

The award ceremony was held at the Singapore Indoor Stadium on 27 October 2007.

== Nominees and winners ==
Winners are highlighted in bold.

=== Best New Act ===
- **Mi Lu Bing - 迷路兵首张同名专辑**
- **Chew Sin Huey - 从台北到北京**
- Hong Jun Yang (洪俊扬) - 独角兽
- **Jasmine - 雨声**
- **Evan Yo - 首张创作专辑19**
- Cherry Boom - 亲爱的王子
- Fahrenheit - 飞轮海首张同名专辑

=== Best Group ===
- Nan Quan Mama - 藏宝图
- **S.H.E - Play**
- Kangta & Vanness - Scandal
- Fahrenheit - 飞轮海首张同名专辑
- Twins - Around the World with 80 Dollars

=== Best Band ===
- Mi Lu Bing (迷路兵) - 迷路兵首张同名专辑
- F.I.R - 飞行部落
- Cherry Boom - 亲爱的王子
- **Mayday - 为爱而生**
- **Sodagreen - 小宇宙**

=== Best Local Male Artist ===
- Mi Lu Bing - 迷路兵首张同名专辑
- Huang Yida - 完整演出
- **JJ Lin - 西界**
- Hong Jun Yang - 独角兽

=== Best Composing Artist ===
- Leehom Wang - 改变自己
- **Khalil Fong - This Love 爱爱爱**
- Gary Chaw - Superman
- JJ Lin - 西界
- Mayday - 为爱而生

=== Most Popular Male Artist (Listener’s Choice) ===
- JJ Lin
- Nicholas Teo
- Gary Cao
- **Jay Chou**
- Pin Guan
- Jacky Cheung
- Kenji Wu
- niu nai (牛奶)
- Eason Chan
- Tank

=== Most Popular Female Artist (Listener’s Choice) ===
- Valen Hsu
- Jolin Tsai
- Ho Yeow Sun
- Chew Sin Huey
- **Stefanie Sun**
- Angela Chang
- Fish Leong
- Joey Yeung
- Gigi Leung
- Elva Hsiao

=== Most Popular Group (Listener’s Choice) ===
- Mi Lu Bing
- Fahrenheit
- Mayday
- **S.H.E**
- Twins
- F.I.R
- Energy
- 183 Club
- Sodagreen
- Kangta * Vanness (吴建豪、安七炫)

=== Most Popular Newcomer (Listener’s Choice) ===
- Mi Lu Bing
- Daren Tan Sze Wei
- Diya Tan (陈迪雅)
- **Fahrenheit**
- Chew Sin Huey
- Hong Jun Yang
- Ting Chu
- Li Yuchun
- Cherry Boom
- Evan Yo

== Incidents ==
After the nomination list was released, Chew Sin Huey was not nominated for Best Local Artiste. Programme director Foong Wai See replied that the award was awarded to Singaporean or Singaporean Permanent Resident (PR). Warner Music Group's marketing director James Kang protested that Chew was already a Singaporean PR when she released her album but was not publicised. Shi was however nominated for other awards.

During the award ceremony, many nominated artistes, including local artistes, did not turn up due to other events leading to organisers to comment the local artistes unpatriotic and not supporting their local awards.
