= Ting Zhu =

Ting Zhu may refer to:

- Ting Chu (born 1981), Taiwanese singer whose stage name in pinyin is Tíng Zhú
- Ting Zhu (mechanical engineer), Chinese mechanical engineer
- Zhu Ting (footballer) (born 1985), Chinese footballer
- Zhu Ting (volleyball) (born 1994), Chinese women's volleyball player
