= Curse of the Golden Flower =

2006 Chinese film by Zhang Yimou

- Theatrical release poster
- 满城尽带黄金甲
- Directed by: Zhang Yimou
- Written by: Zhang Yimou
- Based on: Thunderstorm by Cao Yu (play)
- Produced by: William Kong; Zhang Weiping; Zhang Yimou
- Starring: Chow Yun-fat; Gong Li; Jay Chou
- Cinematography: Zhao Xiaoding
- Edited by: Cheng Long
- Music by: Shigeru Umebayashi
- Production company: Edko Films
- Distributed by: Edko Films; China Film Group; Beijing New Picture Film Company
- Release date: December 21, 2006
- Running time: 114 minutes
- Country: China
- Language: Mandarin
- Budget: US$45 million
- Box office: US$78,568,977

Curse of the Golden Flower (满城尽带黄金甲) is a 2006 Chinese epic wuxia drama film written and directed by Zhang Yimou. The Chinese title of the movie is taken from the last line of a poem by the Tang dynasty rebel leader Huang Chao.

With a budget of US$45 million, it was, at the time of its release, the most expensive Chinese film to date, surpassing Chen Kaige's The Promise (2005). It was chosen as China's entry for the Academy Award for Best Foreign Language Film for the year 2006, but did not receive the nomination. The film was nominated for Costume Design. In 2007, it received fourteen nominations at the 26th Hong Kong Film Awards and won Best Actress for Gong Li, Art Direction, Best Costume and Make Up Design and Best Original Film Song for "菊花台" (Chrysanthemum Terrace) by Jay Chou.

The plot is based on the 1934 play Thunderstorm by Cao Yu, but it is set in Imperial China instead of the 20th century.

== Plot ==
On the eve of the Double Ninth Festival, the Emperor and the second of his three sons, Prince Jai, return from their military campaign to Nanjing so they can celebrate the holiday with their family. However, the Empress has been in an affair with the first son, Crown Prince Wan, who was born of the Emperor's previous wife. At the same time, Crown Prince Wan has been in an affair with Jiang Chan, daughter of the Imperial Doctor, and is keen on rejecting the throne so that he may run away with her.

Prince Jai notices the declining health of his mother, and is confused by her sudden interest in chrysanthemums, the golden flowers. The Empress explains that the tea she drinks has been poisoned for some time by the Emperor, but that she is planning a rebellion to overthrow him. After some initial hesitation, Prince Jai agrees to be the leader of the rebellion. The Empress hires a mysterious woman to discover the type of poison which she is suffering from, but the woman is captured by Crown Prince Wan and taken to the Emperor. As it happens, the woman is Jiang Shi, the Imperial Doctor's wife, whom the Emperor imprisoned a while ago and who was believed dead, but somehow escaped. The Emperor decides to pardon her and to promote the Imperial Doctor to governor of Suzhou. When Crown Prince Wan meets with Jiang Chan to say goodbye, she informs him that the Empress has woven 10,000 scarves with golden flower sigils. Crown Prince Wan confronts the Empress, and when she admits to planning a rebellion, he is anguished, and tries to kill himself, but survives.

On the way to Suzhou, the Imperial Doctor's household is betrayed and attacked by the Emperor's assassins, resulting in his death. Jiang Shi and Jiang Chan run back to Nanjing and confront the Emperor, who refuses to answer, whereupon the Empress explains to Jiang Chan that Jiang Shi was the Emperor's first wife and Crown Prince Wan's mother, meaning that Jiang Chan and Crown Prince Wan are half-brother and sister. Jiang Chan is horrified by this news and runs from the palace. Jiang Shi chases after her, whereupon both are murdered by more assassins. At this point, the third son, Prince Yu, suddenly murders Crown Prince Wan and reveals he has been aware of the corruption of both the Emperor and the Empress. Summoning a group of his own soldiers, Prince Yu demands the Emperor abdicate and offer him the throne. However, more of the Emperor's assassins descend from the ceiling and easily defeat Prince Yu's soldiers. The Emperor proceeds to whip Prince Yu to death using his belt.

Meanwhile, the outer square of the palace is assaulted by 10,000 soldiers wearing gold flower sigils, with Prince Jai in the lead. They overpower the assassins and proceed to the inner square of the palace, trampling upon the bed of golden flowers arranged for the ceremony. However, thousands of soldiers, the reserve army of the Emperor, appear and slaughter the golden soldiers; only Prince Jai survives, and he is taken captive. Behind him, the courtyard is cleaned with mechanical efficiency by a legion of servants, with bodies being removed, floors being scrubbed and laid with carpets, and pots of yellow flowers being replaced, making it seem as if the entire rebellion never even happened. At midnight, the Double Ninth Festival begins as scheduled. At the table, the Emperor expresses disappointment with Prince Jai, saying that he was already planning to give him the throne. Prince Jai says that he did not rebel to obtain the throne, but for his mother's sake. The Emperor responds by offering to pardon Prince Jai if he cooperates in the Empress's poisoning. Prince Jai refuses and kills himself, and as he does so, his blood spills into another cup of poisoned tea that has been brought to the Empress, turning the tea red. Horrified, the Empress slaps the tea away, and the liquid is shown to corrode the table's wood, along with the golden flower image engraved into the wood.

== Cast ==
=== Imperial family ===
- Chow Yun-fat as Emperor Ping (大王 Dàwáng "King")
- Gong Li as Empress Phoenix (王后 Wánghòu "Queen")
- Jay Chou as Prince Jai (Prince Yuanjie (王子元杰 Wángzǐ Yuánjié)), the middle son of Emperor Ping
- Liu Ye as Crown Prince Wan (Crown Prince Yuanxiang (太子元祥 Tàizǐ Yuánxiáng)), the eldest son of Emperor Ping
- Qin Junjie as Prince Yu (Prince Yuancheng (王子元成 Wángzǐ Yuánchéng)), the youngest son of Emperor Ping

=== Physician Jiang's family ===
- Ni Dahong as Imperial Physician Jiang (蒋太医 Jiǎng-tàiyī), later Governor of Xuju and Commander of Chariots
- Chen Jin as physician's wife (Mrs. Jiang (蒋氏 Jiǎng-shì))
- Li Man as Jiang Chan (蔣嬋 Jiǎng Chán, physician's daughter)

== Title ==
The Chinese title of the movie is taken from the last line of a poem written by the rebel leader Huang Chao who was also the emperor of the self-proclaimed Qi dynasty that was at war with the Tang dynasty. Huang Chao had composed the poem "On the Chrysanthemum, after failing the Imperial Examination" (不第後賦菊/不第后赋菊) or simply "Chrysanthemum":

When autumn comes on Double Ninth Festival, / my flower [the chrysanthemum] will bloom and all others perish. / When the sky-reaching fragrance [of the chrysanthemum] permeates Chang'an, / the whole city will be clothed in golden armour.

（Original Chinese text: 待到秋來九月八，我花開後百花殺。沖天香陣透長安，滿城盡帶黃金甲。）

Due to the film's high-profile while it was still in production, its title, which can be literally translated as "The Whole City is Clothed in Golden Armor", became a colorful metaphor for spring 2006 sandstorms in Beijing and the term "golden armor" (黄金甲, huángjīnjiǎ) has since become a metaphor for sandstorms among the locals.

== Historical perspective ==
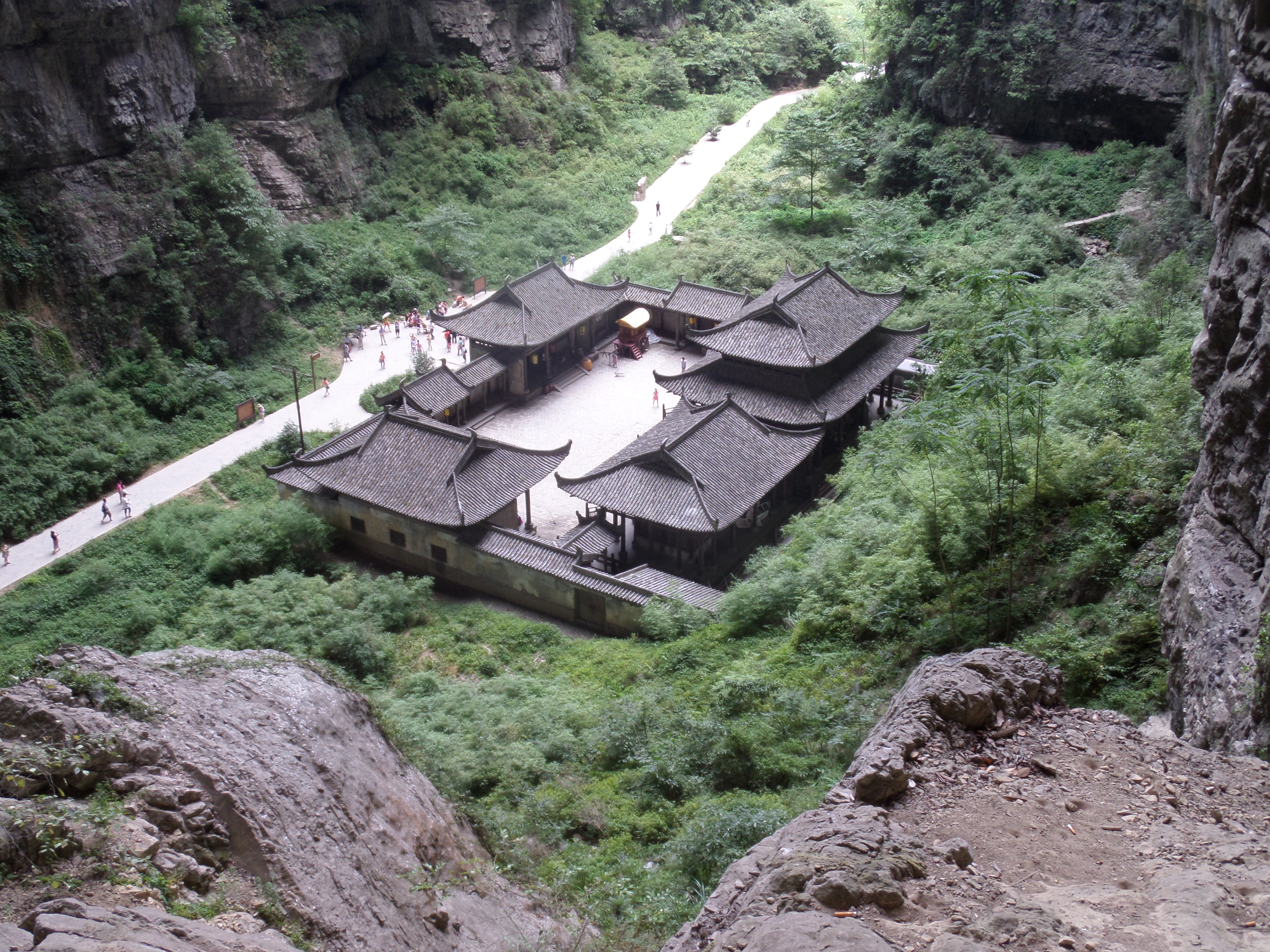
Buildings created for the film at Three Natural Bridges.

The screenplay is based on Thunderstorm, a renowned Chinese play written by Cao Yu in the 1930s.

The two protagonists are known in the Chinese version as "King" and "Queen", which in the English version has been upgraded to "Emperor" and "Empress". The distinction is not trivial, as the lower title "king" only lays claim to a defined region whereas the supreme "emperor" claims overlordship over the entire world. The choice of title therefore implies that despite the splendour of its court the polity depicted in the film does not actually rule all of China.

The English language version states that this movie is set in the "Tang dynasty" in the year 928. The Chinese version does not specify a time period. The film's published screenplay indicates it is set during Later Shu of the Five Dynasties and Ten Kingdoms period. Neither the Tang dynasty (618–907) nor Later Shu (934–965) existed in the year 928, although another state named Tang — known as Later Tang in history — did, as well as other Chinese states Wu, Chu, Min, Southern Han, Jingnan and Wuyue, in addition to the Khitan-ruled Liao dynasty (known as just Khitan in 928). However, Later Tang rulers were known as "Emperor" (皇帝) and never "King" (大王), and of all the states mentioned above, only Chu, Wuyue, Min and Jingnan rulers could be called "King" by their subjects in 928.

Suzhou is evidently under the jurisdiction of the state featured in the film, as the King is able to appoint Dr. Jiang its governor. This points to the story being based in Wuyue, whose ruler Qian Liu was addressed as a "king" by the Later Liang dynasty from 923 C.E. Qian Liu thereafter began to take on styles that were similar to, but slightly lower status to, the Later Liang emperor, including referring to his residence as a palace, referring to his place of administration as a court, and referring to his orders as edicts. Suzhou was one of the 13 provinces of his kingdom. However, the story in the film is far different from the account of Qian Liu.

== Reception ==
=== Box office ===
The US release garnered a generally positive reception. The film grossed over $78 million worldwide. It was also the third highest grossing non-English language film in 2006 after Apocalypto and Pan's Labyrinth.

=== Critical response ===
Richard Corliss of Time praised the film's lurid operatic aspect: "this is high, and high-wire, melodrama...where matters of love and death are played at a perfect fever pitch. And grand this Golden Flower is." Jeannette Catsoulis of The New York Times states: "In Curse of the Golden Flower Mr. Zhang achieves a kind of operatic delirium, opening the floodgates of image and melodrama until the line between tragedy and black comedy is all but erased." Kevin Thomas of the Los Angeles Times described the film as: "A period spectacle, steeped in awesome splendor and lethal palace intrigue, it climaxes in a stupendous battle scene and epic tragedy" and "director Zhang Yimou's lavish epic celebrates the gifts of actress Gong Li while weaving a timeless tale of intrigue, corruption and tragedy." Andrew O'Hehir of Salon said: "the morbid grandiosity of Curse of the Golden Flower is its own distinctive accomplishment, another remarkable chapter in the career of Asia's most important living filmmaker."

Stephen Hunter of The Washington Post wrote: "Zhang Yimou's Curse of the Golden Flower is a kind of feast, an over-the-top, all-stops-pulled-out lollapalooza that means to play kitschy and grand at once" and Hunter further states: "It's just a great old wild ride at the movies."

Matt Brunson of Creative Loafing felt that the film was a poor reflection of director Zhang Yimou's acclaimed previous works. Bruce Westbrook of The Houston Chronicle though praising the film's spectacular visuals, stated "Visuals alone can't make a story soar, and too often this one becomes bogged down by spectacle..." Kirk Honeycutt of The Hollywood Reporter wrote the film is "A disappointing misfire from a great director." Gene Seymour of Newsweek said: "Curse of the Golden Flower is to the feudal costumed adventure what Nicholas Ray's Johnny Guitar is to the Western. Both bend their genres to the extremes of operatic grandeur with such force as to pull up just below the level of High Camp." However, Seymour wrote that the film was overly melodramatic and ludicrous to absorb.

The film received a score of 70 out of 100 from 32 film critics according to the review aggregator Metacritic, indicating "generally favorable reviews" and holds an average rating of 65% by 126 film critics on the review ranking site Rotten Tomatoes, and an average rating of 6.4/10. The website's critical consensus states: "Melodrama, swordplay, and CG armies -- fans of martial arts epic will get what they bargain for, though the baroque art direction can be both mesmerizing and exhaustively excessive".

=== Awards and nominations ===
Curse of the Golden Flower won four awards out of 14 nominations from the 26th Hong Kong Film Awards in 2007.

Category	Nomination	Result	Ref
Best Film	Curse of the Golden Flower	Nominated	
Best Director	Zhang Yimou	Nominated	
Best Actor	Chow Yun-fat	Nominated	
Best Actress	Gong Li	Won	
Best Supporting Actor	Jay Chou	Nominated	
Best Supporting Actor	Liu Ye	Nominated	
Best Cinematography	Zhao Xiaoding	Nominated	
Art Direction	Huo Tingxiao	Won	
Best Costume and Make Up Design	Yee Chung-Man	Won	
Best Action Choreography	Ching Siu-tung	Nominated	
Best Original Film Score	Shigeru Umebayashi	Nominated	
Best Original Film Song	"菊花台" (Chrysanthemum Flower Bed) by Jay Chou from Still Fantasy	Won	
Best Sound Design	Tao Jing, Roger Savage	Nominated	
Best Visual Effects	Cheuk Wah	Nominated	

== Soundtrack ==
Besides starring in the film, Jay Chou has also recorded two songs to accompany the film, one titled "Chrysanthemum Terrace" (Chinese: 菊花台; pinyin: Júhuā tái), released on his seventh studio album Still Fantasy and one included in his Curse of the Golden Flower EP. The EP includes his song "Golden Armor" (Chinese: 黄金甲; pinyin: Huángjīn jiǎ).

== See also ==
- List of most expensive non-English-language films
