= Baron Chen =

Taiwanese actor and model

- Born: May 9, 1978 (age 47); Taiwan
- Occupation(s): Model, Actor

Chinese name
- Traditional Chinese: 陳楚河
- Simplified Chinese: 陈楚河
Transcriptions
Standard Mandarin
- Hanyu Pinyin: Chén Chù Hé
- Musical career
- Also known as: Chen Xiaobao, River Chen
- Origin: Taiwan

Baron Chen (Chinese: 陳楚河; pinyin: Chén Chǔhé; born May 9, 1978) is a Taiwanese actor and model.

== Early life ==
Chen is the eldest son of Chen Chi-li, Not long after he was born, his parents separated so he stayed with his grandparents. He studied tourism at the Chinese Culture University in Taipei.

== Career ==
Chen made his first major appearance in the movie Kung Fu Dunk, but became better known with his role as Dylan in Taiwanese drama, Fated to Love You. He also appeared in two of Jay Chou's music videos for the songs "Blue and White Porcelain" from the album On the Run and "Ocean of Flowers" from Capricorn.

He later gained more fame through his roles in the television series My Daughter and The Magic Blade, which won him Most Popular Actor at the LeTV Awards.

== Filmography ==
=== Television drama ===
Year	Title	Chinese Title	Role	Notes
2006	New Stars in the Night	新昨夜星辰	Ou Mingfei	
2008	Fated to Love You	命中注定我爱你	Dylan/Dai Jianren	
2010	Because of You	星光下的童話	Sun Fan	
2010	Meteor, Butterfly, Sword	流星蝴蝶剑	Meng Xinghun	
2010	My Daughter	夏家三千金	Zhong Haotian	
2011	Qian Duo Duo Marry Diary	钱多多嫁人记	Xu Fei	
2012	Battle of the Beauty	笑红颜	Su Mingyuan	
2012	The Magic Blade	天涯明月刀	Ye Kai	
2012	Starring Actor	头牌	Jin Jiuling	
2013	I Want to Become a Stewardess	我要当空姐	Zhang Shaotan	
2013	Bad Romantic	艾乐乐的罗曼蒂克	Tang Yifan	
2015	Extremely Urgent	迫在眉睫	He Cai	
2015	Bromance	爱上哥们	Du Zifeng	
2018	Battle Through the Heavens	斗破蒼穹	Yao Chen	
2020	Eternal Love of Dream	三生三世枕上书	Zhe Yan	
2020	Reunion: The Sound of the Providence	重启之极海听雷	Hei Xiazi	
2022	Heroes	说英雄谁是英雄	Su Meng Zhen	

=== Films ===
Year	Title	Chinese Title	Role	Notes
2008	Kung Fu Dunk	大灌篮	Xiao Lan	
2009	The Treasure Hunter	刺陵	Pu Ying	
2012	Moonlight Love	月光恋	Ah Kun	

=== Variety ===
Year	Title	Chinese Title	Channel	Notes
2016	Race the World	非凡搭档	Jiangsu TV	Cast

=== Music videos ===
Year	Title	Chinese Title	Singer	Album
2007	Blue and White Porcelain	青花瓷	Jay Chou	On the Run
2008	Ocean of Flowers	花海	Jay Chou	Capricorn
2010	Brothers	哥儿们	Kang Kang	North Drift
