= Blue and White Porcelain =

2007 song by Jay Chou

Single by Jay Chou

from the album On the Run!
- Language: Mandarin
- Released: 2 November 2007
- Recorded: 2007
- Genre: Folk-pop
- Length: 3:59
- Label: JVR Music
- Composer: Jay Chou
- Lyricist: Vincent Fang

Jay Chou singles chronology
"Listen to Mom" (2006)	"Blue and White Porcelain" (2007)	"Rainbow" (2007)

Music video
- "Blue and White Porcelain" on YouTube

"Blue and White Porcelain" (Chinese: 青花瓷; pinyin: Qīng huā cí) is a song recorded by Taiwanese singer-songwriter Jay Chou. It was released on 2 November 2007, as part of the singer's eighth studio album, On the Run! (2007). "Blue and White Porcelain" was written by Vincent Fang, arranged by Baby Chung, and composed by Chou himself.

Fang and Chou drew inspiration for "Blue and White Porcelain" from friends who appreciated traditional Chinese art, motivating both songwriters to use porcelain—a national treasure in China—as the theme of the piece. The song's production contains elements of traditional Chinese opera and utilizes the main melody of the Chinese pentatonic scale "Palace mode" (宮調式). At the 19th Golden Melody Awards in Taipei, the song won three accolades including Song of the Year.

The accompanying music video for "Blue and White Porcelain" stars actor Baron Chen and actress Cherry Hsia; it features Chen as a knight who must exchange a rare treasure blue and white porcelain for his lover Hsia who is kidnapped. On 6 February 2008, Jay Chou sang "Blue and White Porcelain" at the CCTV Spring Festival Gala, which was met with praise from viewers. For additional promotion, the song was performed on several concert tours by Chou, including The Era World Tour (2010–2011).

== Background and history ==
"Blue and White Porcelain"
A 25-second sample of "Blue and White Porcelain," highlighting its composition that incorporates traditional musical elements from Chinese culture.

Originally, Vincent Fang wanted to name the song "Bronze", because bronze is not romantic enough to change the Song dynasty's "Ru ware" for the song title. However, the Ru ware of the word "Ru" would give rise to unflattering associations, and coupled with the romantic elegance of porcelain, Vincent Fang finally decided to use porcelain as the title of the song. At first, the word "porcelain" (青花瓷) was misheard by Jay Chou as "frog pond" (青蛙池).

== Music video and live performances ==
In the music video for "Blue and White Porcelain", Baron Chen portrays a knight who must exchange a rare blue and white porcelain treasure to rescue his kidnapped lover, played by Cherry Hsia. Despite the exchange, the villain kills the knight’s lover. The video then transitions through time and space to a modern antique auction house, where Hsia's character bids on the same blue and white porcelain. She encounters the knight once again, but their reunion ends in tragedy.

On 6 February 2008, Jay Chou sang "Blue and White Porcelain" at the CCTV Spring Festival Gala in Beijing. It was watched by more than 2 million people, with Chou's performance receiving the highest viewership ratings for the event. The performance was well-received by netizens.

== Accolades ==
At award ceremonies in Taiwan, the song won the 19th Golden Melody Awards for Best Song of the Year, Best Lyricist of the Year, and Best Composer of the Year, while Jay Chou won the awards for Best Composer and Best Album Producer, with Vincent Fang receiving the awards on his behalf due to Jay Chou's absence.

Awards and nominations
Year	Award	Category	Result	Ref.
2008	Golden Melody Awards	Song of the Year	Won	
2008	Golden Melody Awards	Best Composer	Won	
2008	Golden Melody Awards	Best Lyricist (for Vincent Fang)	Won	

== Usage in education and controversies ==
In December 2007, a high school in Wuhan, China, used the lyrics of "Blue and White Porcelain" as a topic for a language exam where it asked students to recite the lyrics from memory. On 13 June 2008, the lyrics were used to examine the long history of Chinese porcelain on a college entrance exam question in Shandong, China.

"Blue and White Porcelain" received criticism from scholars due to errors in its lyrics. In the line, "Written in Han Li on the bottom of the bottle to imitate the elegance of the previous dynasty", author and antique collector Ma Weidu pointed out that since the creation of blue and white porcelain, the Han Li style has never been inscribed on the bottom of vases. It was only during the Chongzhen period of the Ming Dynasty that some blue and white porcelain occasionally featured Li style inscriptions. He remarked, "It is evident that the writer did not know much about the history of porcelain." Another mistake was in the line, "I was thinking of you when I copied the Song style signature". According to Ma, Song style signatures were only found on enameled porcelain from the Kangxi, Yongzheng, and Qianlong dynasties, and have never appeared on blue and white porcelain.

In the Peking University admissions test held in Chengdu, China on New Year's Day 2009, a question asked students to point out grammatical errors in the lyrics of the song. Professor Xiong Du from Chongqing Technology and Business University explained that one line, which translates to "the blank outlines the blue and white, the brushstrokes vary in thickness", contained missing directional prepositions leading to unclear subjects. Xiong emphasized that while it is common to omit certain components in poetry and lyrics for the sake of parallelism, rhythm, and harmony, such omissions should not lead to ambiguity or grammatical errors.

== Adaptations ==
"Blue and White Porcelain" has an unofficial adapted version of the chemistry version, adapted by Qiu Wei, a teacher at Leshan No. 1 Middle School, to which Jay Chou said, "This chemistry teacher is great!" and invited him to sing the chemistry version of Celadon with him on stage. There is also a tribute to Steve Jobs.

== Impact ==
The song triggered craze for collecting "blue and white porcelain" and celadon. In 2008, celadon collection enthusiasts in the cities of Chengdu and Chongqing steeply increased to tens of thousands of people from a few hundred in 2007.
