= Lautaro Bellucca =

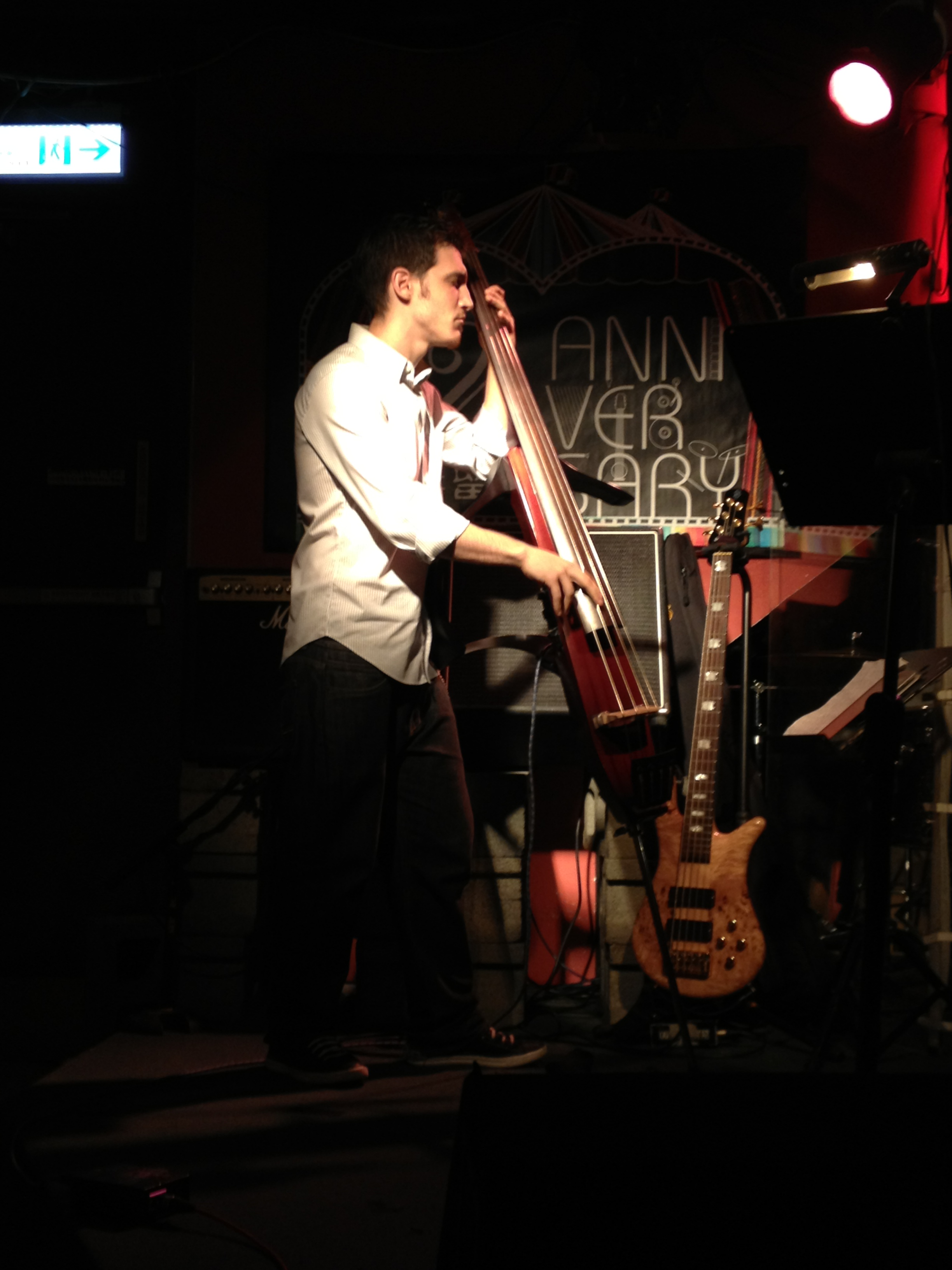
- Lautaro "LuKa" Bellucca

Background information
- Also known as: LuKa
- Born: January 4, 1986 (age 40)
- Origin: Argentina
- Genres: Latin, jazz, blues, fusion
- Instruments: Bass, double bass
- Years active: 2007–present
- Labels: D.F.M
- Website: https://www.facebook.com/pages/LuKa-Lautaro-Bellucca/141119429322727/ LuKa facebook

Lautaro "LuKa" Bellucca (born January 4, 1986, in La Plata) is an Argentine bass and double bassist, composer and arranger, best known as the key bassist in jazz group MUSA's.

== About ==
LuKa has been learning and playing bass since the age of 12. At 14 he studied in EMU, a jazz musical school in La Plata, and started receiving lessons from bass masters like Karl Miklin and Herve Selin (Europe), Hugo Fattoruso (Uruguay), Pedro Aznar (Argentina), and Argentine Bassist Alejandro “el zurdo” Herrera. By the age of 16, he was actively jamming in different [live] sessions in La Plata and Buenos Aires.

Started his career as a professional musician playing in his own hard rock band Pelones, in 2006, with his younger brother Joaquin Bellucca (flute and saxophone), band members Jose Antonio Centorbi (drums and hand percussion) and Juan Gascon (Electric and Acoustic Guitar), his jazz-folkloric band Lo Que Te Falta Quarteto won a contest in La Plata and later released an album under the name of the band.

In 2007, together with the band-leading pianist Martin "Musa" Musaubach also from La Plata, LuKa travelled to China and started a new musical journey in another perspective. By 2011 he was playing with Musa, and drummer/ percussionist Adriano "Gaofei" Moreira, in Shangri-La Summit Wing Hotel Beijing as house band MUSA's Trio.

In mid-summer 2011, accompanying Musa and Adriano, LuKa moved to Taipei to join Project SENSATION with the Malaysian Chinese vocalist Gary Chaw and Taiwanese compose-producer Michael Tu.

His own group, LuKa Group had performed debut in October 2013.

== Related artists and groups ==
- LuKa Group
- The Lifers (with Andrew Page and Cody Byassee)
- Olivia & The Fat Cats (with Olivia Berendsohn, Oren Dashti and Adam Sorensen)
- MUSA's
- SENSATION
