= Secret (soundtrack) =

Soundtrack album by Jay Chou
- Released: 13 August 2007
- Genre: Mandopop, instrumental
- Language: Mandarin
- Label: JVR, Sony
- Producer: Jay Chou

Jay Chou chronology
Curse of the Golden Flower (2006)	Secret (2007)	On the Run! (2007)

Secret (simplified Chinese: 不能说的·秘密; traditional Chinese: 不能說的·祕密) is the soundtrack album for the 2007 Taiwanese romance film, Secret, directed and co-written by Jay Chou and starring Chou, Gwei Lun-mei, Anthony Wong, and Alice Tzeng. The album was produced by Chou, released on 13 August 2007 by JVR Music and Sony Music Taiwan.

The album was nominated a Golden Horse Award for Best Original Film Score and won a Golden Horse Award for Best Original Film Song for "Secret". The album was also nominated for three Golden Melody Awards and won for Best Instrumental Album Producer and Best Instrumental Composer.

The track, "Secret", is listed at number 2 on the 2007's Hit FM Top 100 Singles of the Year.

== Track listing ==
No.	Title	Lyrics	Music	Artist	Length
1.	"Opening"		Terdsak Janpan	Bangkok Symphony Orchestra	2:26
2.	"Bicycle" (腳踏車)		Terdsak Janpan, Jay Chou	Terdsak Janpan, Jay Chou	2:17
3.	"Morning Exercise" (早操)		Jay Chou	Jay Chou	1:34
4.	"Seaside of Tamsui" (淡水海邊)		Jay Chou	Jay Chou	1:03
5.	"Piano Duel Medley" (鬥琴)		Chopin, Jay Chou	Yuri Chan	1:13
6.	"Ensemble with Four Hands of Xianglun & Xiaoyu" (湘倫小雨四手聯彈)		Jay Chou	Chen Chengqi, Huang Wanqi	0:38
7.	"Ride with Me"		Terdsak Janpan	Bangkok Symphony Orchestra	1:26
8.	"Father and Son" (父與子)		Terdsak Janpan, Jay Chou	Terdsak Janpan, Jay Chou	2:15
9.	"Lover's Tears" (情人的眼淚)	Di Yi	Du Fen	Yao Surong	5:57
10.	"First Kiss"		Jay Chou	Jay Chou	1:29
11.	"Girl, Don't Cry for Me" (女孩別為我哭泣)	Huang Junlang	Jay Chou	Alang Huang, David Yang, Zhao Xiongli, Michael Lin	1:19
12.	"Sunny Doll" (晴天娃娃)	Jay Chou	Jay Chou	Jessie Chiang	2:29
13.	"Alang & Abao" (阿郎與阿寶)		Terdsak Janpan, Jay Chou	Terdsak Janpan, Jay Chou	2:18
14.	"Dance with Father" (與父共舞)		Terdsak Janpan	Bangkok Symphony Orchestra	1:23
15.	"Lu Xiaoyu" (路小雨)		Jay Chou	Jay Chou	1:37
16.	"The Swan"		Jay Chou	Jay Chou	2:30
17.	"Flash Back"		Terdsak Janpan	Bangkok Symphony Orchestra	3:16
18.	"Secret" (Lento Version)		Terdsak Janpan, Jay Chou	Huang Wanqi	1:05
19.	"Angel"		Terdsak Janpan	Bangkok Symphony Orchestra	1:51
20.	"Xiaoyu's Theme I" (小雨寫立可白I)		Jay Chou	Jay Chou	1:13
21.	"Xiaoyu's Theme II" (小雨寫立可白II)		Jay Chou	Jay Chou	1:38
22.	"Secret" (Allegro Version)		Jay Chou	Yuri Chan	1:23
23.	"Piano Room" (琴房)		Terdsak Janpan, Jay Chou	Terdsak Janpan, Jay Chou	1:39
24.	"Ending"		Jay Chou	Jay Chou	1:23
25.	"Secret" (不能說的秘密)	Vincent Fang	Jay Chou	Jay Chou	4:56

== Awards ==
Award	Category	Nominated work	Result
Golden Horse Awards	Best Original Film Song	Jay Chou for "Secret"	Won
Golden Horse Awards	Best Original Film Score	Terdsak Janpan & Jay Chou for Secret	Nominated
Golden Melody Awards	Best Instrumental Album Producer	Jay Chou for Secret	Won
Golden Melody Awards	Best Instrumental Composer	Terdsak Janpan & Jay Chou for "Piano Room"	Won
Golden Melody Awards	Best Instrumental Album	Secret	Nominated
