= Sensation (band) =

Music project

- Origin: Malaysia; Taiwan; Argentina; Brazil; United States; China
- Genres: "Unclassified"
- Years active: 2011–present
- Members: Gary Chaw; Michael Tu; Martin "Musa" Musaubach; Lautaro "LuKa" Bellucca; Adriano "Gaofei" Moreira; Fabio Moreira; Danny Deysher; Liu Li-Min "Niu-Niu"
- Website: https://www.facebook.com/GaryChaw/ Gary Chaw official facebook

Sensation is the band title and the music project proposed by the Malaysian Chinese singer and songwriter Gary Chaw with his teacher and the Taiwanese music producer Michael Tu in 2011. As the vocal of the band, he collaborates and performs with the members from MUSA's - with the band-leading pianist Martin "Musa" Musaubach and bassist Lautaro "LuKa" Bellucca from Argentina; and drummer/ percussionist Adriano "Gaofei" Moreira from Brazil.

Guitarist Fabio Moreira, from Brazil, joined in Project 2 started in May 2013. Danny Deysher from the USA teamed up as the quintet member in Aug 2013 as trumpeter. Guitarist Liu Li-Min "Niu-Niu" from Beijing was officially introduced as new SENSATION member in Gary Chaw Sensationally Live Tour Macau 2013.

== About ==
In 2011, Michael Tu introduced the members from MUSA's Trio - Musa, LuKa and Gaofei - to Gary. The idea of SENSATION was born after the members had a brief communication in music and live jamming.

Not only as a band or musical group, according to Gary, "Gary Chaw x MUSA's Trio x Michael Tu = SENSATION" is also a new musical concept and label, which he would like to produce as projects.

They [secretly] performed live in Riverside Café Taipei once in 2011 for their independent debut.

== Project SENSATION ==
=== 2011~2012: Project 1 ===
From December 2011 to January 2012, SENSATION performed in Taipei, Kaohsiung and Taichung in Gary Chaw SENSATION x JAZZ 爵士巡迴音樂會. Limited single Project Sensation JAZZ was released solely available to live hall and KKBOX, as the debut project the single includes two rearranged songs All I Have To Do Is Dream and I Just Called To Say I Love You, at the same time comprised with the instrumental version of the songs performed by MUSA's Trio.

The band released their debut album Gary Chaw Project Sensation 1 Jazz in June 2012. On July 14 SENSATION Jazz Tour kicked off in Taipei. In the same month the band also performed in Singapore and Malaysia.

In the same year on August 4 and 5, SENSATION hit the stage again in Gary Chaw's concert Gary Chaw Sensational Sound Concert in Hong Kong Coliseum.

On October 5 the band performed together in CPOP LIVE in Macau, and as special guest performers in 2012 Golden Indie Music Awards (GIMA) on Nov 3. The band also appeared as special guest again for the charity show for Marie Claire: Voice for Women on December 11.

=== 2013: Project 2 ===
In 2013 April, Fabio officially joined D.F.M and team up with the original MUSA's Trio as the guitarist in SENSATION Project 2. Fabio had already joined the trio and supported Gary Chaw in Sensational Sound Concert in Hong Kong Coliseum in August 2012.

MUSA's Trio move on and officially grow as MUS4's (quartet) to welcome the joining of Fabio in order to explore different possibilities with different musicians line up in the production. In August, Danny Deysher the trumpeter, team up with MUSA's as the new quintet member in MU5A's in SENSATION, performing the project group's first live in 2013 in Summer Jazz Outdoor Party.

In "Gary Chaw Sensationally Live Tour Macau 2013", Gary announced the team up of the guitarist Liu Li-Min "Niu-Niu" (from 空氣罐頭 Canned Air) in the upcoming project.

== Project Members ==
- Gary Chaw - vocal
- Michael Tu - production
- Martin "Musa" Musaubach - piano & keyboard
- Lautaro "LuKa" Bellucca - bass & double bass
- Adriano "Gaofei" Moreira - drums & percussions
- Fabio Moreira - guitar /in project 2
- Danny Deysher - trumpet and flügelhorn /in project 2
- Liu Li-Min "Niu-Niu" - guitar /in project 2

== Releases ==
Singles

- Project Sensation JAZZ (2011/12)

Albums

- Gary Chaw Project Sensation 1 Jazz (2012/06)

== Related Artists & Groups ==
- Gary Chaw
- MUSA's
- Martin "Musa" Musaubach
- Lautaro "LuKa" Bellucca
- Adriano "Gaofei" Moreira
