= Fated to Love You (2008 TV series) =

2008 Taiwanese television drama

- Promotional poster
- Also known as: 命中注定我愛你
- Genre: Romance; Comedy
- Written by: Pan Yiqun; Chen Xinyi; Du Xinyi
- Directed by: Chen Mingzhang
- Starring: Joe Chen; Ethan Juan; Baron Chen; Bianca Bai
- Opening theme: "I Love Him 99 Times" (99次我愛他) by Shorty Yuen
- Ending theme: "Sticky Note With Wishes" (心願便利貼) by Quack Wu and Shorty Yuen
- Country of origin: Taiwan
- Original languages: Mandarin; Taiwanese
- No. of series: 1
- No. of episodes: 24

Production
- Production locations: Taiwan, Hong Kong and Shanghai
- Running time: 90 minutes
- Production company: Sanlih E-Television (SET)

Original release
- Network: TTV
- Release: March 16 – August 24, 2008

Related
- You Are My Destiny

Fated to Love You (Chinese: 命中注定我愛你; pinyin: Mìng zhòng zhù dìng wǒ ài nǐ) is a 2008 Taiwanese television drama series broadcast by TTV. Directed by Chen Mingzhang, it stars Joe Chen, Ethan Juan, Baron Chen, and Bianca Bai. It aired from March 16 to August 24, 2008. The series with location filming in Taiwan, Hong Kong and Shanghai.

The drama holds the record for the highest average single-episode rating at 10.91 with a peak at 13.64 for episode 20 broadcast on 27 July 2008, and broke the previous record held by The Prince Who Turns into a Frog. It was nominated in 2008 for six awards at the 43rd Golden Bell Awards, Taiwan. It was awarded the 2008 Best Television Series and Best Marketing Programme.

Fated to Love You was also reviewed by The Wall Street Journal.

== Synopsis ==
Chen Xinyi (Joe Chen), a dowdy legal assistant at a large law firm, plans pays for a romantic love cruise to lose her virginity to her boyfriend/coworker Guchi. Fellow passenger Ji Cunxi (Ethan Juan), the wealthy sole heir of a toiletries company, plans to propose to his long-time ballerina girlfriend Anna (Bianca Bai) and sets about finalizing the preparations – unaware that she has not boarded the ship. Xinyi and Cunxi surprisingly wind up spending the afternoon in bed, both mistaking the other for their actual partners. Suddenly, Xinyi's brother-in-law and his father burst in their suite to snap photos of Cunxi and the prostitute they hired to lure him into an indelicate situation. They hope to blackmail him not to close their hair products factory on Ginger Island.

== Cast ==
Actor	Character	Description
Joe Chen	Chen Xinyi/Elaine	The main character of the series who later becomes Cunxi's wife
Ethan Juan	Ji Cunxi	Xinyi's husband
Baron Chen	Dylan/Dai Jianren	Cunxi's rival, Anna's brother
Bianca Bai	Anna Shi/Dai Xinyi	Xinyi's rival and Dylan's sister
Tan Ai-chen	Ji Wang Zhen Zhu	Cunxi's grandmother
Na Weixun	Anson	Cunxi's trusted assistant
Lin Mei-hsiu	Chenlin Xishi	Xinyi's mother
Jessica Song	Chen Qingxia	Xinyi's first sister
Chung Hsin-ling	Chen Fengjiao	Xinyi's second sister
Wei Min-ge	Wu Qiqi	Xinyi's brother-in-law
Luo Bei-an	Wu Liuliu	Qiqi's father
Wang Juan	Ji Liu Xiu Lin	Cunxi's stepmother
Tian Jiada	Ji Zhengren	Xiulin's son
Patrick Lee	Guchi	Xin Yi's ex-boyfriend
Miu Miu	Ji Baobei	Cunxi's dog

== Soundtrack ==
Fated to Love You

Soundtrack album by Various Artists
- Released: 18 April 2008
- Genre: Mandopop
- Language: Mandarin
- Label: Rock Records

Fated to Love You Original Soundtrack (命中注定我愛你 電視原聲帶) was released on 18 April 2008 under Rock Records. It contains fifteen songs from various artists, in which three songs are various instrumental versions of the five original songs, and another three songs that are kala versions. The album was released in two versions: the regular edition (CD) with shiny Post-It Card, and the deluxe edition (2CD+DVD) with an additional eleven track CD and a music video DVD. The opening theme song is "I Love Him 99 Times" (Chinese: 99次我愛他) by Shorty Yuen, while the ending theme song is "Sticky Note With Wishes" (Chinese: 心願便利貼) by Quack Wu and Shorty Yuen. The latter ranked 50 on Hit Fm Taiwan's Hit Fm Annual Top 100 Singles Chart in 2008.

=== Track listing ===
No.	Title	Singer(s)	Length
1.	"I Love Him 99 Times" (99次我愛他)	Shorty Yuen
2.	"Sticky Note With Wishes" (心願便利貼)	Quack Wu feat. Shorty Yuen
3.	"Half Love Song" (半情歌)	Shorty Yuen
4.	"Get Up and Go" (起步走)	Quack Wu
5.	"My Happiness" (我的快樂)	Walkie Talkie
6.	"I'm OK" (我好了)	Shorty Yuen
7.	"Blowing Wind" (吹吹風)	Gary Chaw
8.	"Fold" (對摺)	Shorty Yuen
9.	"Sticky Note With Wishes (inst.)" (心願便利貼)
10.	"Half Love Song (inst.)" (半情歌)
11.	"I Love Him 99 Times (inst.)" (99次我愛他)
12.	"Get Up and Go Kala ver." (起步走)
13.	"Half Love Song (inst.)" (半情歌_療傷情弦 inst.)
14.	"Sticky Note With Wishes (inst.)" (心願便利貼_浪漫溫馨 inst.)
15.	"I Love Him 99 Times (inst.)" (99次我愛他_夢幻音樂盒 inst.)

Bonus CD 2
No.	Title	Length
1.	"你就是吃定我" (楊乃文)
2.	"可惜不是你" (梁靜茹)
3.	"We are Good People (我們都是好人)" (蘇慧倫)
4.	"愛上你只是我的錯" (dMDM)
5.	"女人何苦為難女人" (辛曉琪)
6.	"Go to Sleep, My Love! (睡吧！我的愛)" (許景淳)
7.	"只要你快樂" (汪佩蓉)
8.	"成全" (劉若英)
9.	"Let's Think (讓我想一想)" (陳綺貞)
10.	"孩子氣" (萬芳)
11.	"飄洋過海來看你" (娃娃)

Bonus DVD
No.	Title	Length
1.	"Half Love Song (MV)" (半情歌 MV)
2.	"Sticky Note With Wishes (MV)" (心願便利貼 MV)
3.	"I Love Him 99 Times (MV)" (99次我愛 MV)

== Books ==
- Fated to Love You Top Secret Behind-the-Scenes (命中注定我愛你 極機密幕後花絮) - ISBN 978-957-565-819-9 (2008)
- Fated to Love You TV Drama Novel (命中注定我愛你 電視小說) - ISBN 978-957-565-813-7 (2008)

== International airing ==
- Philippines: Fated to Love You aired on GMA Network from February 16 to May 22, 2009, replacing Money War and was replaced by One Liter of Tears

== Remakes ==
A 2014 South Korean remake titled You Are My Destiny that starred Jang Hyuk and Jang Na-ra in the lead roles.

A 2020 Japanese remake titled Unmei Kara Hajimaru Koi: You Are My Destiny (運命から始まる恋 You are my Destiny, Love Starting from Faith: You are my Destiny)) starring Miori Takimoto and Takumi Kizu. It aired on Fuji TV in 2020.

== Awards and nominations ==
Year	Ceremony	Category	Recipients	Result
2008	43rd Golden Bell Awards	Best Television Series	Fated to Love You	Won
2008	43rd Golden Bell Awards	Best Actress	Joe Chen	Nominated
2008	43rd Golden Bell Awards	Best Supporting Actress	Lin Mei-hsiu	Nominated
2008	43rd Golden Bell Awards	Best Director in a Television Series	Chen Ming-chang	Nominated
2008	43rd Golden Bell Awards	Best Writing for a Television Series	Chen Yu-shan, Pan Yi-qun, Chen Xin-yi and Du Xin-yi	Nominated
2008	43rd Golden Bell Awards	Best Marketing	Fated to Love You	Won
