= Blue (Gary Chaw album) =

格格 Blue

Studio album by Gary Chaw
- Released: 27 January 2006
- Genre: Mandarin pop
- Label: Rock Records

Gary Chaw chronology
Gary (2001)	格格 Blue (2006)	Superman (2006)

格格 Blue is the second album and first major album by Gary Chaw (Chinese: 曹格), released on 27 January 2006.

== Track listing ==
- All songs composed by Gary Chaw, except for "Superwoman", which was Karyn White cover of Mandarin version; "姑娘", which contains sample of traditional song "Jasmine (茉莉花)" (unknown author/composer but the original author/composer is 何方 if rumors, gave a share with whom credits).
- "世界唯一的妳" (The world's only you) is originally Gary Chaw wrote a song for the homeless cat with no owner (now it belongs to him), later another lyricist(s) to re-wrote the different lyrics.
- Lyricists are listed below.
1. Superwoman
  Lyricist: 徐世珍; Composers: Kenneth "Babyface" Edmonds / Antonio "L.A." Reid / Daryl Simmons
2. 世界唯一的妳
  Lyricists: 徐世珍 / 永邦 (Yong Bang also co-wrote lyrics, credited on the some of internet and uncredited on the album)
3. 姑娘
  Lyricist and Composer: Gary Chaw / 何方
4. 情人節快樂
  Lyricist: 小色
5. Fall In Love
  Lyricist: 阿佛列德 (Hank)
6. 笑我笨
  Lyricist: Gary Chaw
7. 燭光晚餐
  Lyricist: 葛大為
8. 數到五答應我
  Lyricist: Gary Chaw
9. 沉默玩具
  Lyricist: 伊藤
10. 刮目相看
  Lyricist: 廖世傑
11. Superwoman Kala (伴奏/Karaoke Version)

== Translation ==
1. Superwoman
2. The Only One In The World
3. Girl
4. Happy Valentines
5. Fall In Love
6. Laugh At My Stupidity
7. Candle Light Dinner
8. Promise Me After Count To Five
9. Silent Toy
10. Look With Approval
11. Superwoman - Instrumental
