= Danny Dun =

Taiwanese actor, director, and screenwriter

Danny Dun An-ning
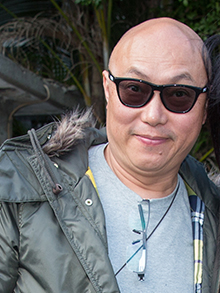
- Danny Dun in 2014
- Born: 1956 (age 68–69); Taiwan
- Occupation(s): Actor, director, screenwriter
- Years active: 1986–present
- Spouse: Chang Hsiao-wen (張小雯) (m. 1987)
- Children: 1

Chinese name
- Traditional Chinese: 鄧安寧
- Simplified Chinese: 邓安宁
Transcriptions
Standard Mandarin
- Hanyu Pinyin: Dèng Ānníng
Yue: Cantonese
- Jyutping: Dang6 On1 Ning6
Southern Min
- Hokkien POJ: Tēng An-lêng
- Musical career
- Also known as: Danny Deng, Danny Teng, Deng An-ning, Teng An-ning

Dun An-ning (born 1956), also known as Danny Dun, is a Taiwanese actor, director, and screenwriter.

== Early life ==
In 1956, Dun was born as Dun An-ning in Taiwan.

== Filmography ==
=== Films ===
Year	English title	Original title	Role	Notes
1986	Dust in the Wind	戀戀風塵		
1988	Soursweet		Chen	English-language film
1989	Gang of Three Forever	童黨萬歲		
1989	Old Man and Girl	老少五個半		
1991	King of Chess	棋王		
1991	A Piggy Tale	娃娃	sportscaster	
1991	A Brighter Summer Day	牯嶺街少年殺人事件	film director	
1994	A Confucian Confusion	獨立時代	Larry	
1996	Tonight Nobody Goes Home	今天不回家		
1997	Sexy Story	捉姦,強姦,通姦		also director and writer
1999	A Tale of Rascal	好孩子	film director	
2000	Yi Yi	一一	A-Di's friend	
2002	Double Vision	雙瞳	Hsieh's doctor	
2006	Catch	國士無雙		
2006	Island Etude	練習曲	film director	
2007	I Wish	奇妙的旅程	photographer	
2011	The Killer Who Never Kills other men	殺手歐陽盆栽	Dr Foreskin	
2012	Viva Baseball!!	球來就打	Headmaster Chao	
2013	Forever Love	阿嬤的夢中情人	restaurant owner	

=== TV dramas ===
Year	English title	Original title	Role	Notes
1994	The Seven Heroes and Five Gallants	七俠五義	Gongsun Ce	
2005	A Cinematic Journey	浪淘沙		
2006	The Hospital	白色巨塔	Wang Shi-ping	
2006	Angel Lover	天使情人		director, co-producer
2008	Letter 1949	我在1949，等你		
2008	Love or Bread	我的億萬麵包	fortune teller	
2012	Drama Go! Go! Go!	姐姐立正向前走		director
2012	Miss Rose	螺絲小姐要出嫁	priest	also co-director
2014	The Lying Game	謊言遊戲		
2015	A Touch of Green	一把青	lieutenant general	
2016	Where the Heart expplodes	歸·娘家		
2016	All in 700	700歲旅程		director
