= Superman (Gary Chaw album) =

Studio album by Gary Chaw
- Released: 27 December 2006
- Genre: Mandarin pop
- Label: Rock Records

Gary Chaw chronology
格格 Blue (2006)	Superman (2006)	Super Sunshine (2008)

Superman is the second album by Gary Chaw, which is released on 27 December 2006. After the hit success in his first album 格格 Blue, he came out with his second album of the same name. This is the second album he released in the same year.

== Track listing ==
- All songs composed by Gary Chaw; "我的甜蜜蜜" contains sample of Teresa Teng's famous song or Indonesian folk song "甜蜜蜜".
- Lyricists are listed below.
1. Superman
  Lyricist: 阿丹
2. 兩隻戀人 (Liang Zhi Lian Ren)
  Lyricist: 徐世珍
3. Girlfriend
  Lyricist: 阿丹
4. 背叛 (Bei Pan)
  Lyricists: 阿丹 / 邬裕康
5. 妳是我的寶貝 (Ni Shi Wo De Bao Bei)
  Lyricist: Gary Chaw
6. 3-7-20-1
  Lyricist: 邬裕康
7. 保護你 (Bao Hu Ni)
  Lyricist: 徐世珍
8. 愛到底 (Ai Dao Di)
  Lyricist: 俞方
9. 我的甜蜜蜜 (Wo De Tian Mi Mi)
  Lyricist: Gary Chaw
10. 天使忌妒的生活 (Tian Shi Ji Du De Sheng Huo)
  Lyricist: 邬裕康

== Translation ==
1. Superman
2. Two Lovers
3. Girlfriend
4. Betrayal
5. You're My Baby
6. 3-7-20-1
7. Protect You
8. Love Till The End
9. My Sweetie
10. The Life That Angels Envy
