= Bianca Bai =

Taiwanese actress and model

- 白歆惠
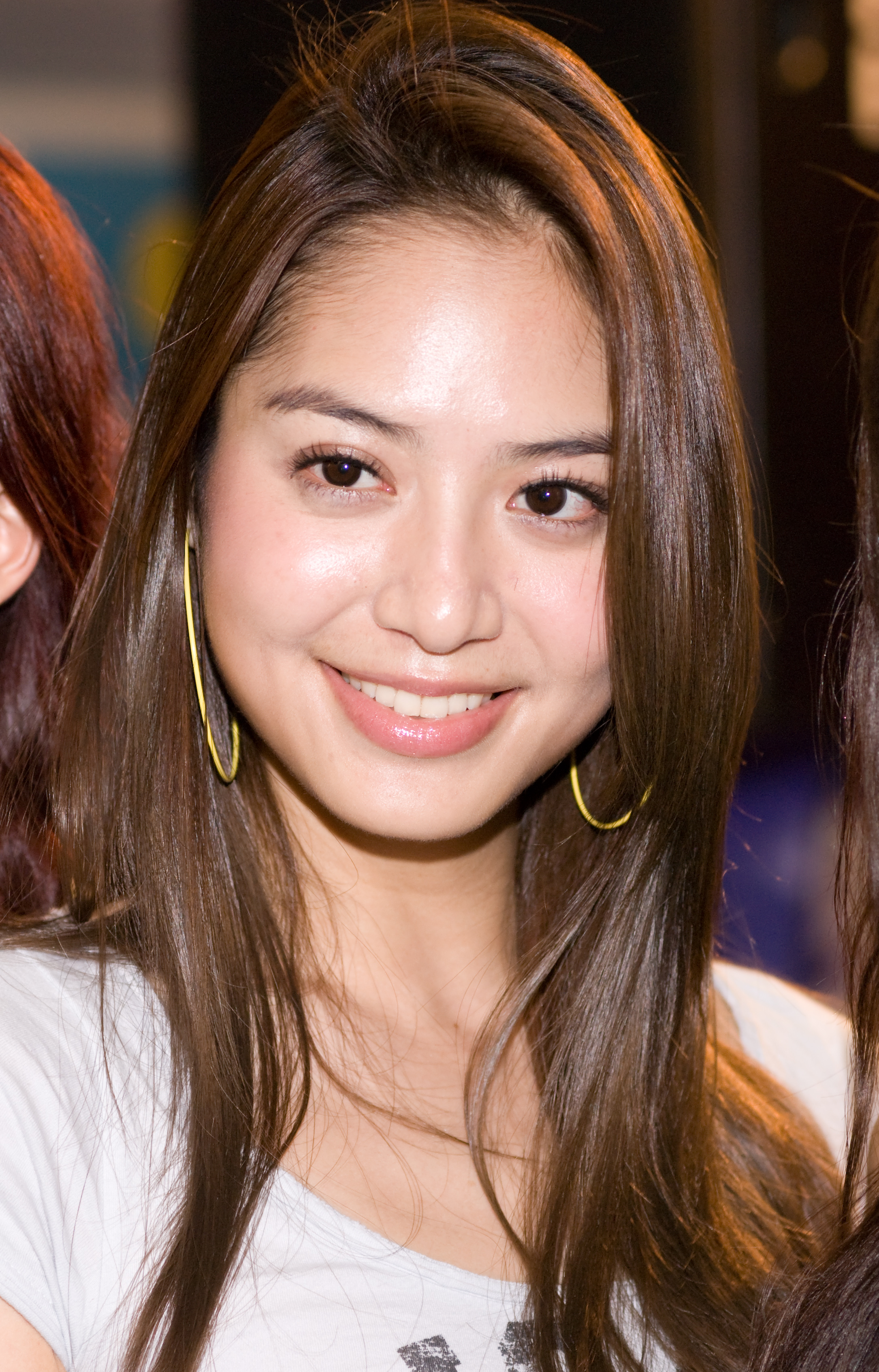
- Bai in 2007
- Born: 23 October 1982 (age 44); Taipei, Taiwan
- Education: Shih Hsin University
- Occupations: Actress; model
- Children: 1
- Parent: Pai Kuo-chia (father)

Bianca Bai (Chinese: 白歆惠; pinyin: Bái Xīnhuì; born 23 October 1982) is a Taiwanese actress and model.

== Biography ==
Bai graduated from Shih Hsin University and started her career as a model with Catwalk Modeling Agency before becoming an actress. She was nominated in 2010 for Best Actress at the 45th Golden Bell Awards for her role in Shining Days.

In June 2016, Bai gave birth to a son.

== Filmography ==
=== Television series ===
Year	English title	Original title	Role	Network
2005	It Started with a Kiss	惡作劇之吻	Bai Hui Lan	CTV
2006	Angel Lover	天使情人	Li Xi Ai	Star TV
2008	Fated to Love You	命中注定我爱你	Shi Anna/Dai Xin Yi	TTV
2009	Shining Days	閃亮的日子	Fang Yi An	CTV
2010	P.S. Man	偷心大聖 P.S. 男	Amanda	TTV
2011	Soldier	勇士們	Li Min Hui	TTV
2011	Skip Beat	華麗的挑戰	Jiang Nanqin	FTV
2012	Loves in Penghu	陽光正藍	Li Mei Juan	TTV
2014	If I Love You	如果我爱你	Shan Shan	Hunan TV
2015	Liao Zhai 4	聊斋新编	Lu Zhu	ZJTV

=== Film ===
Year	Title	Original title	Role
2010	Kingfisher	鱼狗	Mei Ping
2012	My Dear Stilt	候鸟来的季节	Zhu Han Ying
2015	Boeuf Bourguignon Taipei	傻瓜與睡美人	Ye Chen Xi
2016	Ace of Sales	销售奇姬	Chen Su Fen
