= Letter 1949 =

- Promotion poster
- Also known as: 我在1949等你
- Genre: Romance; Drama
- Opening theme: "新月" Xin Yue (New Moon) by He Yi Qi (何以奇)
- Ending theme: "荷花妝" He Hua Zhuang by Lai Xiu Zhong (賴琇中)
- Country of origin: Taiwan
- Original language: Mandarin
- No. of episodes: 12

Production
- Production locations: Taipei; Shanghai
- Running time: 120 mins (Monday through Thursday 20:00–22:00)
- Production company: Eastern Shine Production

Original release
- Network: Chinese Television System (CTS)
- Release: 9 November – 26 November 2008

Letter 1949 (Chinese: 我在1949，等你; pinyin: Wǒ Zài 1949, Děng Nǐ; lit. 'I will wait for you in 1949') is a 2008 Taiwanese drama starring Queenie Tai, Lin Yo-wei, Alien Huang, Hawick Lau. It was produced by Eastern Shine Production. The series was broadcast on free-to-air Chinese Television System (CTS) from 9 to 26 November 2008, Monday to Thursday at 20:00.

In 2010 Chang Chen-kuang was nominated for Best Supporting Actor and Chang Yu-ao was nominated for Best Art and Design Award at the 45th Golden Bell Awards.

== Synopsis ==
In 2009, 80-year-old former journalist Lin Xiang refuses to move out of his old home earmarked for demolition. Lin Xiang after much persuasion by his students finally provided an old photo of his for an 'Old Shanghai' photo exhibition. The exhibition arrives in Taipei, Han Zu Guang takes his wife, Qiao Yan Qing, to see it at the invitation of a former colleague. At the exhibition Qiao Yan Qing faints at seeing Lin Xiang's photo of herself taken in 1949, who has been waiting for her for 60 years ...

== Cast ==
- Queenie Tai as Han Wei in 2009 / Qiao Yan Qing in 1949
- Shen Hai-jung as Qiao Yan Qing in 2009
- Lin Yo-wei as Tang Xuan in 2009 / Tang Hao Yiin 1949
- Chang Chen-kuang as Tang Hao Yi in 2009
- Alien Huang as Li Wen Xiong in 2009
- Hawick Lau as Lin Xiang in 1949
- Huang Xiao Li as Lin Xiang in 2009
- Jack Li as Han Zu Guang in 1949
- Ku Pao-ming as Han Zu Guang in 2009
- Yue Yao Li as Tang Fei in 1949

=== 2009 ===
- Renzo Liu as Han Ben Li
- Xie Qiong Nuan as Fan Chun Mei
- Gao Zhen Peng as Lao Fang
- Ivy Yin as Yun Ji
- Matt Wu as Edward
- Maggie Wu as Mo Sheng Sheng
- Lu Yi Long as Zhang Xing Hua
- Chu Lu-hao as Lao Ma
- Zhong Xin Ling as Xiao Pang
- Qiu Xiu Min as Lin Zhi Zi
- Cai Ming Yi as A Yuan
- Liu Yi Ling as A May
- Zhang Ling as Mary
- Li Zhuo as Kenny
- Lei Jun Kai as Xiao Lei
- Wu Pei Qi as News anchor
- Guan Xin as Tang Hao Yi's secretary
- Sun Hui Ting as Tang Xuan's secretary
- Can Wei Yi as Nick
- Zhang Jun as Dong Yi Jun
- Huang Zhi Rong as gallery guard

=== 1949 Taiwan ===
- Lin Mei-hsiu as Lin Xiang's mother
- Di Zhi Jie as Xiao Fang
- Jag Huang as Xiao Ma
- Qiu Yi Feng as Zhang Xing Hua
- Wu Yi Ting as Jiao Min
- Chen Ji Ping as Jiao Zong
- Lu Xiao Qing as Lin Zhi Zi
- Yan Sheng Yu as robber
- Deng Sheng Yao as servant

=== 1949 Shanghai ===
- Danny Dun as Editor Zhao
- Chen Xiao Ping as Chu Yan Ling
- Li Bing Bing as A Si
- Zhou Xiao Hai as Lao Xu
- Li Quan You as Xiao Gao
- Chen Ze Lin as Xiao Bao
- Xu Shou Qin as Gao An Ming
- Zhu Ying as Miss Xu
- Zhao Ming Yu as Tailor Wang
- An De Lie as Western waiter

== Credits ==
- Producer: Liang Han Hui, Xu Zhi Yi, Gao Qi Fang
- Director: Chen Ming Zhang, Danny Dun
- Screenwriter: Wu Luo Ying, Wu Wei Jun, Zhang Wei Ting, Yang Jing Xiang, Pan Guan Hong
