= 19th Golden Melody Awards =

Taiwanese music awards ceremony in 2008

- Location: Taipei Arena, Taiwan
- Hosted by: Tao Ching-Ying; Patty Hou; Barbie Hsu; Dee Hsu

Television/radio coverage
- Network: Azio TV

Ceremonies of the 19th Golden Melody Awards (Chinese: 第19屆金曲獎; pinyin: Dì shíjiǔ jīn qū jiǎng) were held in Taipei, Taiwan in 2008. Nominees were announced on 22 May, 2008, and the award winners in 12 traditional music categories (of 47 nominees) and 23 popular music categories (of 124 nominees) were selected by a panel of 33 judges after four rounds of jury meetings. Initially, there were 10,632 submissions from 185 companies in the music industry, making it the largest submission pool in the Awards' history.

Winners for artistic and traditional music categories were announced on 21 June, 2008, at Taipei County Hall in a ceremony separate from that for popular music categories. It was the second consecutive year that the ceremony for this category group was held separately, and it did not attract as much media attention as the ceremony for the popular music categories. By contrast, artists from Taiwan, Hong Kong, Singapore, Malaysia, Japan, and Canada attended the awards ceremony for popular music categories, which was held at the Taipei Arena on 5 July, 2008. Actress sisters Barbie and Dee Shu, former news anchor Patty Hou, and actress Matilda Tao hosted this event, whose list of award presenters included Canadian recording artist Daniel Powter and Japanese drama stars Akito Kiriyama, Junta Nakama, and Yuya Takaki. Both events were broadcast on the satellite cable Azio Television channel on June 28 and July 5, respectively.

Malaysian singer Gary Chaw and Singaporean singer-songwriter Tanya Chua were named Best Mandarin Male and Female Singers in the popular music category, respectively. Chua won the Best Mandarin Female Singer award for the second time; she last won the award in the 17th Golden Melody Awards. Chua's record seven nominations for her album Goodbye & Hello are the most received by a female artist. Taiwanese musician and singer Jay Chou, who received a record-breaking eight nominations for his album On the Run and film Secret, was not able to attend the event due to his tour in China. Chou's primary lyricist Vincent Fang was present to receive the award of Best Lyricist for the song "Blue and White Porcelain" (Chinese: 青花瓷; pinyin: qīng huā cí). Pop rock band Sodagreen received its second consecutive award as Best Band for its album Incomparable Beauty.

== Nominees and winners ==
Winners are listed first and highlighted in boldface.

=== Popular music categories ===
==== Best song ====
- **Blue and White Porcelain (青花瓷) – On the Run (我很忙) – Jay Chou**
  - Against the Light (逆光) – Against the Light (逆光) – Stefanie Sun
  - A Moment (一眼瞬間) – Star – A-mei (and Jam Hsiao)
  - Darwin (達爾文) – Goodbye & Hello – Tanya Chua
  - Incomparable Beauty (無與倫比的美麗) – Incomparable Beauty (無與倫比的美麗) – Sodagreen
  - Love Song – Wonderland (未來) – Khalil Fong

==== Best Mandarin album ====
- **L!VE IS...KAREN MOK (拉活...莫文蔚) – Karen Mok**
  - Against the Light (逆光) – Stefanie Sun
  - Goodbye & Hello – Tanya Chua
  - Incomparable Beauty (無與倫比的美麗) – Sodagreen
  - On the Run (我很忙) – Jay Chou
  - Star – A-mei

==== Best Taiwanese album ====
- **Love Songs (真情歌) – Ricky Hsiao**
  - Close to Home (厝邊) – Cheng Chiu-hsuan (鄭秋玄)
  - Love of Life III—Companionship (人間有愛3—歡喜作伴) television soundtrack
  - Kou! It's Coming Out!!! (拷!!出來了!!) – Kou Chou Ching (拷秋勤)
  - Toilet Paper (衛生紙) – New Formosa Band

==== Best Hakka album ====
- **2007 Banana – Ayu Huang (黃連煜)**
  - An Old Tree, New Branches (老樹新枝) – Liu Jung-chang (劉榮昌)
  - Hair Bun Flower (髻鬃花) – Cheng Chao-fang (鄭朝方)
  - In Love with Old Mountain Railway (戀戀舊山線) – Chiu Hsing-yi (邱幸儀) and Chiu Li-ling (邱俐綾)

==== Best aboriginal album ====
- **Ipay Buyci (依拜維吉) – Ipay Buyci (依拜維吉)**
  - Auba! The Most Beautiful Tribe (鰲芭!最美的部落)
  - Chalaw Passiwali (查勞．巴西瓦里) – Chalaw Passiwali (查勞．巴西瓦里)
  - My Name Is Bai Lang – Bai Lang (蔣進興)
  - Nasi (生命) – Sauniaw (少妮瑤)

Ipay Buyci is a self-titled album in the Atayal language.

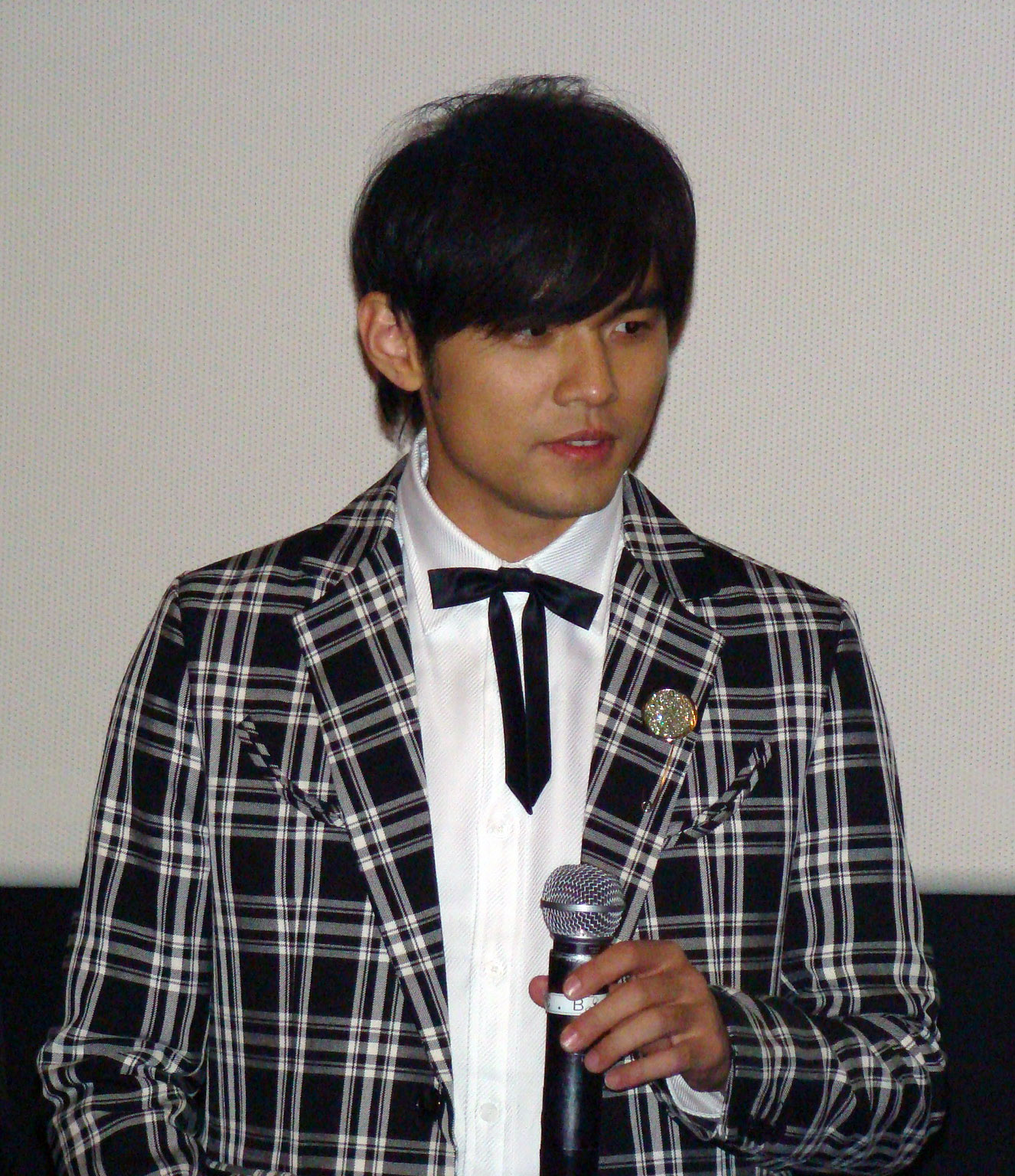
Jay Chou received a record-breaking eight nominations for songs from his album On the Run and film Secret.

==== Best composer ====
- **Jay Chou – Blue and White Porcelain (青花瓷), sung by Jay Chou**
  - Gary Chaw – Blink of an Eye (一眼瞬間), sung by A-mei and Jam Hsiao
  - Tanya Chua – Blank Space (空白格), sung by Tanya Chua
  - Ricky Hsiao – Love the Song (愛這首歌), sung by Ricky Hsiao
  - Lin Chi–yu (林倛玉) – Lucky to Have Your Love (慶幸有你愛我), sung by Joi Chua
  - Wu Ching-feng (吳青峰) – Incomparable Beauty (無與倫比的美麗), sung by Sodagreen

==== Best lyricist ====
- **Vincent Fang – Blue and White Porcelain (青花瓷), sung by Jay Chou**
  - Deserts Chang – After All (畢竟), sung by Deserts Chang
  - Chyi Chin and Chang Chen-yue – Love Sickness (思念是一種病), sung by Chang Chen-yue (and Tanya Chua)
  - Hsiao Han (小寒) – Darwin (達爾文), sung by Tanya Chua
  - Liao Ying-ju (廖瑩如) – Against the Light (逆光), sung by Stefanie Sun
  - Yeh Kuo-chu (葉國居) – Hair Bun Flower (髻鬃花)

==== Best arrangement ====
- **Hsiao An (小安) – Agent J (特務J), for Jolin Tsai**
  - Chen Chien-chi (陳建騏) – j'Adore (崇拜), for Fish Leong
  - Chung Hsing-min (鍾興民) – Blue and White Porcelain (青花瓷), for Jay Chou
  - Huang Chung-yueh (黃中岳) – Darwin (達爾文), for Tanya Chua
  - Martin Tang – Against the Light (逆光), for Stefanie Sun
  - Tu Hui-yuan (涂惠源) – Wake-up Song (起床歌), for Gary Chaw
  - Wu Ching-feng (吳青峰), Shih Chun-wei (史俊威), Hsieh Hsing-i (謝馨儀), Liu Chia-kai (劉家凱), He Ching-yang (何景揚), Kung Yu-chi (龔鈺祺), Lin Wei-tse (林暐哲) – Incomparable Beauty (無與倫比的美麗), for Sodagreen

==== Best album producer ====
- **Tanya Chua – Goodbye & Hello, released by Tanya Chua**
  - Terry Chan – L!VE IS... (拉活...), released by Karen Mok
  - Gary Chaw and Tu Hui-yuan (涂惠源) – Super Sunshine, released by Gary Chaw
  - Ayu Huang (黃連煜) – 2007 Banana, released by Ayu Huang (黃連煜)
  - Tsao Teng-chang (曹登昌) – Ipay Buyci (依拜維吉), released by Ipay Buyci (依拜維吉)

==== Best single producer ====
- **Adia (阿弟仔) – Agent J (特務J), released by Jolin Tsai**
  - Chen Chien-liang (陳建良) – Fool (傻瓜), released by Landy Wen
  - Chung Cheng-hu (鍾成虎) – Pussy, released by Cheer Chen
  - Ma Yun-fen (馬韻芬) – Blink of an Eye (一眼瞬間), released by A-mei (and Jam Hsiao)
  - Tank – Anti-Terrorism Squad (反恐小組), released by Tank

==== Best mandarin male singer ====
- **Gary Chaw – Super Sunshine**
  - Eason Chan – Admit It (認了吧)
  - Khalil Fong – Wonderland (未來)
  - Shin (信) – I Am I (我就是我)
  - Tank – Keep Fighting (延長比賽)
  - Yang Pei-An (楊培安) – Pei-an Yang's Album No. 2 (楊培安II)

==== Best taiwanese male singer ====
- **Ricky Hsiao – Love Songs (真情歌)**
  - Michael Shih – Be Together Tonight (今夜我陪你)
  - Wang Shih-hsien – Man of Iron (堅強)

==== Best mandarin female singer ====
- **Tanya Chua – Goodbye & Hello**
  - A-mei – Star
  - Joi Chua – Joi Blessed (慶幸擁有)
  - Fish Leong – j'Adore (崇拜)
  - Karen Mok – L!VE IS... (拉活...)
  - Stefanie Sun – Against the Light (逆光)

==== Best taiwanese female singer ====
- **Chan Ya-wen – Life Highway (人生公路)**
  - Chen Si-an (陳思安) – Appreciation (體會)
  - Liu I-chun (劉依純) – Lonesome Moon (孤單的月娘)
  - Showlen Maya – Homesickness (望鄉思情)
  - Sun Shu-may – Chance to Love You (愛你的機會)

==== Best hakka singer ====
- **Ayu Huang (黃連煜) – 2007 Banana**
  - Sinco Chiu (邱幸儀) and Aileen Chiu (邱俐綾) – In Love With Old Mountain Railway (戀戀舊山線)
  - Lin Tzu-chun (林姿君) – Hakka Girl (客家妹)
  - Liu Jung-chang (劉榮昌) – An Old Tree, New Branchesso justu (老樹新枝)

==== Best aboriginal singer ====
- **Ipay Buyci (依拜維吉) – Ipay Buyci (依拜維吉)**
  - Amoy (林照玉) – Beautiful Voice of Aboriginal Music (原聲中之美聲)
  - Bai Lang (蔣進興) – My Name Is Bai Lang'
  - Chalaw Passiwali (查勞．巴西瓦里) – Chalaw Passiwali (查勞．巴西瓦里)
  - Sauniaw (少妮瑤．久分勒分) – Nasi (生命)

Ipay Buyci, the winner of this category, is a member of the ethnic Atayal people.

==== Best band ====
- **Sodagreen – Incomparable Beauty (無與倫比的美麗)**
  - Cherry Boom – Goody Goody (乖乖)
  - Kou Chou Ching (拷秋勤) – Kou! It's Coming Out!!! (拷!!出來了!!)
  - Mavis Fan and 100%樂團 – 2007 Breakthrough Album (范曉萱+100%樂團 / 2007突破影音專輯)
  - Mrs. This (這位太太) – Who (是誰)
  - Won Fu (旺福樂團) – Youth Dance (青春舞曲)

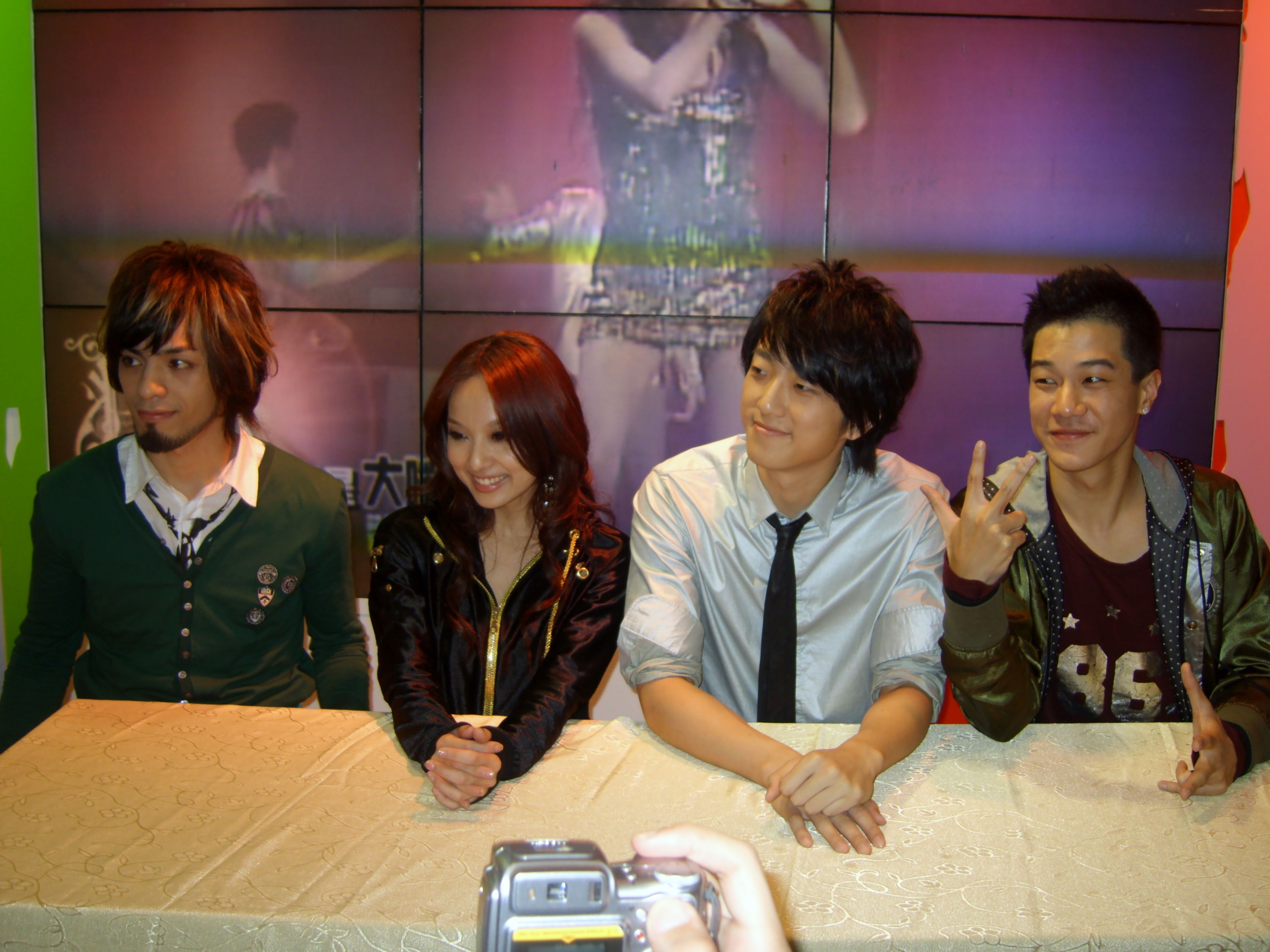
Taiwan hip hop group Da Mouth, which made its debut in 2007, received the Best Singing Group award.

==== Best singing group ====
- **Da Mouth – Da Mouth (大嘴巴)**
  - Nan Quan Mama – Treasure Map (藏寶圖)
  - Soler – x2

==== Best newcomer ====
- **Debbie Hsiao (蕭賀碩) – Shuo's Map Album (碩一碩的流浪地圖)**
  - Lo Si-rong (羅思容) – Everyday (每日)
  - Connie Lu (呂莘) – Moment of Love (心動的時刻)
  - WOW – The Big Hits (頭號人物)
  - Chris Wu (吳听徹) – Stay Up (徹夜未眠)
  - Olivia Yan (閻韋伶) – Silly Child (傻孩子)

==== Best instrumental album ====
- **Fantasia of Tuscany (托斯卡尼我想起你) – Lee Cin-yun (李欣芸)**
  - Mr Bebu (Mr比布) – Chipin & Kaiya (启彬与凯雅)
  - Secret (不能說的秘密) – Jay Chou
  - Sizhukong (絲竹空) – Peng Yu-wen (彭郁雯)

==== Best instrumental album producer ====
- **Jay Chou – Secret (不能說的秘密)**
  - Denise Juan (阮丹青) – Sunshine Costa (陽光海岸)
  - Lee Cin-yun (李欣芸) – Fantasia of Tuscany (托斯卡尼我想起你)
  - Peng Yu-wen (彭郁雯) – Sizhukong (絲竹空)

==== Best instrumental composer ====
- **Jay Chou and Terdsak Janpan – Secret (不能說的秘密)**
  - Chang Shih-he (章世和) – The Expedition soundtrack (霹靂開疆紀原聲帶)
  - Lee Cin-yun (李欣芸) – Fantasia of Tuscany (托斯卡尼我想起你)
  - Denise Juan (阮丹青) – Sunshine Costa (陽光海岸)

==== Best music video director ====
- **Chou Ke-tai (周格泰) – j'Adore (崇拜), sung by Fish Leong**
  - Chen Hung-yi (陳宏一) – Learned (學會), sung by Ivana Wong
  - Chu Hsueh-yi (區雪儀) – Why, sung by Mavis Fan and 100%樂團
  - Chung Wei-chuan (鍾偉權) – This is Me (我就是這樣的), sung by Paul Wong
  - Hsu Yun-hsuan (徐筠軒) – Left Side (左邊), sung by Sodagreen

==== Lifetime contribution award ====
- **Chen Chih-yuan (陳志遠)**

=== Artistic and traditional music categories ===
==== Best traditional music album ====
- **Sepiuma's Songs (Sepiuma, 唱情歌)**
  - Cheng Rom-shing Music Album (鄭榮興音樂專輯)
  - Quest for the Garden Saunter and the Interrupted Dream (尋找遊園驚夢)
  - The Ultimate of Peking Opera: Wei Haimin Performance Mei Lanfang School (芳華現—魏海敏梅派經典唱段選輯)
  - Tu Ju-sung Bamboo Flute Solo Album (杜如松笛聲吹向雲水間—笛簫獨奏專輯)

==== Best classical music album ====
- **Capriccio Pine Breeze: Hsieh Wan-chen's Oboe Album (越界嬉遊—謝宛臻oboe跨界演奏專輯)**
  - Chun-Chieh Yen Debut Album
  - In Love with You (暗戀男聲)
  - Ouyang Ling-yi's J.S. Bach: Six Suites for Violoncello Solo (歐陽伶宜演譯巴赫無伴奏大提琴組曲全集)

==== Best children's music album ====
- **Traditional Children's Music of Tsou Tribe (鄒族傳統童謠)**
  - Learning Hakka (學客話)
  - Shine Like a Star (發光如星)

==== Best religious music album ====
- **Apocalypse (Vol. 1): The Future That Amazes (啟示錄前卷—令人驚嘆的未來世界專輯)**
  - Dharma Flower (花香飄來時) Yangjin Lamu (央金拉姆)
  - Realizing the Self in Resonance (以音聲求)
  - Song of Praises III: Liu Chih-ming's Sacred Music (禮頌III—劉志明聖樂作品集)
  - The Lord Is My Shepherd (耶和華是我牧者)

==== Best crossover music album ====
- **Wolf Totem (狼圖騰)**
  - Capriccio Pine Breeze: Hsieh Wan-chen's Oboe Album (越界嬉遊—謝宛臻oboe跨界演奏專輯)
  - Soundtrack for Ciao Ci-chao (曹七巧)

==== Best songwriter ====
- **He Xuntien (何訓田) – Images in Sound (聲音圖案) – Mili Pattern (秘厘圖)**
  - Hsu Ya-min (許雅民) – Apocalypse (Vol. 1): The Future That Amazes (啟示錄前卷—令人驚嘆的未來世界專輯) – Apocalypse (Vol. 1): The Future That Amazes (啟示錄前卷—令人驚嘆的未來世界專輯)
  - Huang Yan-chung (黃燕忠) – Harvest Festival of Music (音樂豐年祭) – Harvest Festival (豐年祭)

==== Best lyricist ====
- **Cheng Chou-yu – Travel in Dream (旅夢) – A Plate of Poetry (一碟兒詩話)**
  - Chen Wei-pin (陳維斌) – Rainbow of Black and White (斷層的台語歌曲—黑白的彩虹) – Tung Blossom Waltz (桐花圓舞曲)

==== Best composer ====
- **Yiu-Kwong Chung (鍾耀光) – Aboriginal Rhythm (原住民新韻) – Kao Yi-sheng's Song (高一生歌曲)**
  - Chen Yi-hui (陳怡慧) – Ciao Ci-chao (曹七巧) soundtrack – Spring Time (春暖時分)

==== Best producer ====
- **Wang Chih-ping (王志萍) – Quest for the Garden Saunter and the Interrupted Dream (尋找遊園驚夢)**
  - Huang Jia-lung (黃家隆) – Ouyang Ling-yi's J.S. Bach: Six Suites for Violoncello Solo (歐陽伶宜演譯巴赫無伴奏大提琴組曲全集)
  - Liu Liang-yen (劉亮延) – Ciao Ci-chao (曹七巧) soundtrack
  - Wang Min-hung (王閔弘) – In Love With You (暗戀男聲)

==== Best traditional music interpretation ====
- **Wei Hai-min – The Ultimate of Peking Opera: Wei Haimin Performance Mei Lanfang School (芳華現—魏海敏梅派經典唱段選輯)**
  - Cheng Rom-shing (鄭榮興) – Cheng Rom-shing music album
  - Kung Ai-ping (孔愛萍) – Quest for the Garden Saunter and the Interrupted Dream (尋找遊園驚夢)
  - Sepiuma Group (和平部落歌團) – Sepiuma's Songs (Sepiuma, 唱情歌)
  - Tu Ju-sung (杜如松) – Tu Ju-sung Bamboo Flute Solo Album (杜如松笛聲吹向雲水間—笛簫獨奏專輯)

==== Best vocalist ====
- **Taipei Male Choir (拉縴人男聲合唱團) – In Love With You (暗戀男聲)**
  - Formosa Singers (福爾摩沙合唱團) – Formosa Singers and Gary Graden (驚豔人聲—福爾摩沙合唱團 and Gary Graden)
  - Jeannie Voce (蔣啟真) – Summertime (夏日情懷)
  - Taipei Artist Choir (台北藝術家合唱團) – Because of Love (因為愛)
  - Wang Xinxin (王心心) – Realizing the Self in Resonance (以音聲求)

==== Best music performer ====
- **Yen Chun-chieh (嚴俊傑) – Chun-Chieh Yen Debut Album**
  - Magic Clarinet Quartet (魔笛單簧管四重奏) – The Dancing Clarinet (魔笛之舞)
  - Ouyang Ling-yi (歐陽伶宜) – Ouyang Ling-yi's J.S. Bach: Six Suites for Violoncello Solo (歐陽伶宜演譯巴赫無伴奏大提琴組曲全集)

==== Jury special mention ====
- **Lin Yu-chih (林煜智)**

==== Lifetime contribution award ====
- **Chu Ting-shun (朱丁順)**

== Presenters and performers ==
=== Presenters ===
Presenters for the popular music categories at the ceremony:

- Taiwan singer Rainie Yang, along with Japanese drama stars Akito Kiriyama, Junta Nakama, and Yuya Takaki, presented the awards for Best Composer and Best Singing Group.
- Singers Jia-jia (紀家瑩) and Samingad (紀曉君), both members of the ethnic Puyuma people, presented the awards for Best Aboriginal Singer and Best Aboriginal Album.
- Entertainer Kang Kang and singer Frankie Kao presented the awards for Best Arrangement and Best Song.
- Television host Hsiao Chung (小鐘), along with Hakka singers and past winners Liu Shao-hsi (劉劭希) and Hsieh Yü-wei (謝宇威), presented the awards for Best Hakka Singer and Best Hakka Album.
- One Million Star top 10 finalist Aska Yang and musician Kay Huang (黃韻玲) presented the awards for Best Music Video Director and Best Newcomer.
- P'eng Ch'ia-ch'ia (澎恰恰), entertainer Pai Bing-bing, and Hsü Hsiao-shun (許效舜) presented the awards for Best Taiwanese Male Singer and Best Taiwanese Female Singer.
- "Queen of Taiwanese music" Jody Chiang and lyricist Vincent Fang presented the award for Best Taiwanese Album.
- Musicians Ni Fang-lai (倪方來) and Ma Yü-fen (馬毓芬) presented awards for the instrumental music categories of Best Album Producer, Best Composer, and Best Album.
- Record producer Huang Kuo-lun (黃國倫) and Taiwan's "Queen of Pub" Tiger Huang presented the awards for Best Single Producer and Best Album Producer.
- Taiwan musicians Lo Ta-yu and Chang Chen-yue presented the awards for Best Lyricist and Best Band.
- Aboriginal Taiwanese pop singer A-mei and Cantopop singer Eason Chan presented the award for Best Mandarin Male Singer.
- Taiwan pop singer Jolin Tsai and Canadian recording artist Daniel Powter presented the award for Best Mandarin Female Singer.
- Hong Kong singer and actor Wakin Chau and Taiwan record producer Jonathan Lee presented the award for Best Mandarin Album.
- Vanessa Shih, a minister at the Government Information Office, presented the Lifetime Contribution Award.

=== Performers ===
There were six performance segments during the ceremony:

- "AMit Fever": A-mei
- "Super High Line": Samingad (紀曉君) and Jia-jia (紀家瑩)
- "Music and the City": Daniel Powter
- "Love GOKUSEN Medley": Akito Kiriyama, Junta Nakama, and Yuya Takaki
- "Music in Heaven": Aska Yang and Yoga Lin
- "Now and Forever": Wakin Chau, Jonathan Lee, and Lo Ta-yu
