= Angel Lover =

2006 Taiwanese television series

- Also known as: Tien Shih Ching Jen
- 天使情人
- Genre: Romance
- Written by: Fang Yi De; An Jin Hong
- Directed by: Danny Dun
- Starring: Ming Dao; Bianca Bai; Coco Jiang; Alex To
- Opening theme: Angel's Eye 發現真愛 by 183 Club
- Ending theme: Forgotten 遺忘 by 183 Club
- Country of origin: Taiwan
- Original language: Mandarin
- No. of episodes: 40

Production
- Producers: Danny Dun; Pan Jie
- Running time: 21:30

Original release
- Network: STAR Chinese Channel
- Release: 4 December 2006 – 26 January 2007

Angel Lover (Chinese: 天使情人) is a 2006 Taiwanese romance TV series starring Ming Dow, Bianca Bai, Alex To, Coco Jiang. It was written by Fang Yi De / An Jin Hong and directed by Danny Dun. The series was distributed by Singapore's MediaCorp Studios and aired on STAR Chinese Channel from 4 December 2006 to 26 January 2007 at 21:30 for 40 episodes.

== Synopsis ==
At a time when Angelina (Coco Jiang) was at her emotional low-point and was involved in a car accident, a wonderful man named Michael (Tomohisa Kagami) showed up as a doctor and cured her of her broken heart. Michael gave her the confidence and hope to continue living. However, he left shortly after she became ready to love again, and just in time for her to find out that he was a chikan. Michael told Angelina that he had something else more important to attend to, and he wanted her to help others find the right path in their lives and the courage to love again, just like what he had done for her.

Thus, Angelina opens up an agency named "Angel Lover" and finds five men to assist those women who are troubled with love and lack confidence in life. The protagonist, Yang Tian You (Ming Dow), is also an "Angel Lover", and has a pure heart.

== Cast ==
- Ming Dow as Yang Tian You (楊天佑)
- Bianca Bai as Li Xi Ai (黎希艾)
- Alex To (credited as Alex Tu) as Yu Tai (宇泰)
- Coco Jiang (credited as Co Co) as Angelina
- Ix Shen as MARS
- Remus Kam as Han Shao Xi (韓少熙)
- Tae Sattawat as Sunny
- Tomohisa Kagami as Michael

=== Extended cast ===
- Tian Li as Lin Fang Hua (林芳華)
- Janel Tsai as Sun Jin (孫瑾)
- Cheryl Yang as Vivian
- Chamder Tsai as Hao Yun (郝韻)
- Li Jia Ying as Xiao Jing (小靜)
- Da Ya as Xiao Jun (小君)
- Phyllis Quek as Li Shu Yun (李書芸)
- Queenie Tai as Tang Tang (糖糖)
- Huang Yu Rong (Ep 40)
- Zhang Hao Ming as Batman (Ep 1 & 2)
- Na Wei Xun
- Jag Huang
- Albee Huang as Young Lin Fang Hua 林芳華
- Tao Chuan Zheng as Han Shao Xi's father

== Soundtrack ==
Angel Lover Original Soundtrack ver 2 cover

Soundtrack album by Jungiery artistes
- Released: 7 December 2006
- Genre: Mandopop
- Language: Mandarin
- Label: Warner Music Taiwan

Angel Lover Original TV Soundtrack (CD) (天使情人電視原聲帶) was released on December 7, 2006 by Jungiery artistes under Warner Music Taiwan. It contains 18 tracks, in which 12 songs are various instrumental versions of the songs. The opening theme is track 2 "Angel's Eye 發現真愛" by 183 Club, while the closing theme is track 16 "Forgotten 遺忘" by 183 Club. A second version of the soundtrack was released on January 3, 2007 that contained a bonus VCD featuring 4 music videos from the soundtrack.

=== Track listing ===
No.	Title	Singer(s)	Length
1.	"Angel's Intro"	Instrumental	1:01
2.	"Angel's Eye" (發現真愛)	183 Club	3:30
3.	"We Will Fly"	Instrumental	3:43
4.	"Falling"	Instrumental	3:24
5.	"No Regret For Loving You" (不後悔的決定)	183 Club	3:52
6.	"Eyes Of Love" (看見愛)	Instrumental	3:23
7.	"Can't Go Back" (回不到那些美好時光)	Instrumental	1:57
8.	"Open Your Eyes"	Instrumental	2:27
9.	"Can We Try?"	Instrumental	3:47
10.	"Eraser In The Head" (腦海的橡皮擦)	Ehlo Huang 黃玉榮	3:24
11.	"How Are You?" (你好不好？)	Instrumental	4:11
12.	"Forgotten Promise" (被遺忘的承諾)	Instrumental	2:55
13.	"Realize" (開始明白)	Instrumental	3:01
14.	"Afraid Of Darkness" (怕黑)	Bianca Bai 白歆惠	4:25
15.	"Forever Yours"	Instrumental	2:25
16.	"Forgotten" (遺忘)	183 Club	4:11
17.	"Close Your Eyes"	Instrumental	3:20
18.	"Make A New Start" (從頭)	183 Club	3:49

=== Bonus VCD ===
No.	Title	Length
1.	"Angel's Eye 發現真愛" (MV)
2.	"Forgotten 遺忘" (MV)
3.	"No Regret For Loving You 不後悔的決定" (MV)
4.	"Make A New Start 從頭" (MV)

== Production credits ==
- Producer: Danny Dun / Pan Jie
- Director: Danny Dun
- Screenwriter: Fang Yi De / An Jin Hong
- Music: Huang Yu Ling
