= Martin Musaubach =

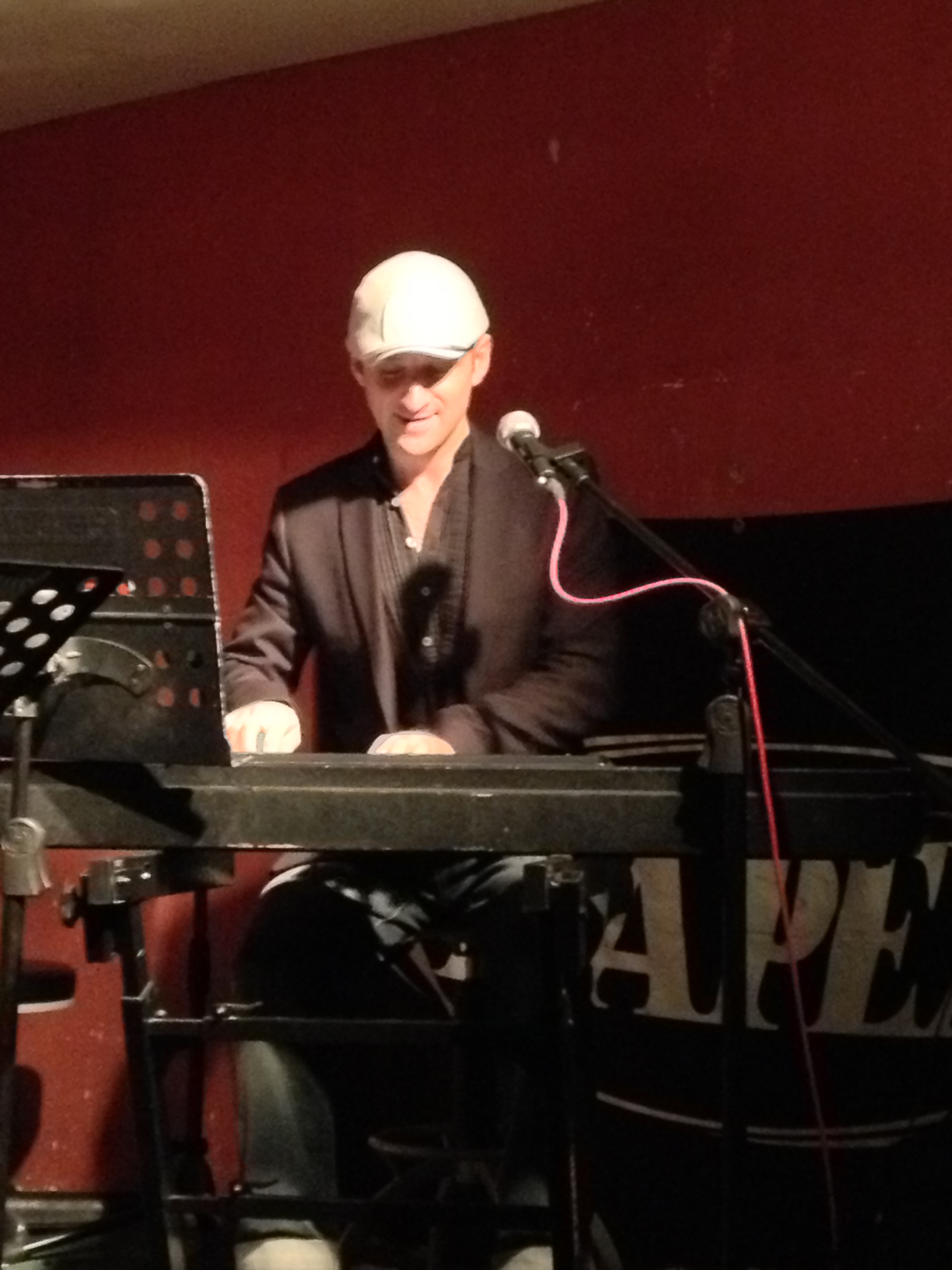
- Martin "Musa" Musaubach

Background information
- Also known as: Musa
- Born: May 23, 1982 (age 43); La Plata, Argentina
- Genres: Latin, Jazz, Blues, Fusion
- Occupations: Pianist, keyboardist, composer, arranger, producer
- Instrument: piano
- Years active: 2007–present
- Labels: Studio 3690
- Website: https://www.musaubach.com/ Musaubach homepage

Martin "Musa" Musaubach (born May 23, 1982, in La Plata, Argentina) is an Argentine band-leading pianist, composer, arranger and producer in MUSA's.

== About ==
Musa was the member of jazz, blues and Latin music bands including Labrusca, Zoe, 5 Australes, Reina Venus, Blues Oil and Bin Bin, which Labrusca was the first band he joined in his hometown La Plata—he was only at the early age of 13, as a keyboardist and the youngest member in the band.

From around 2007 Musa started his career in China playing live music in some famous jazz bars with his band members as MUSAS. By 2011 he was the musical director in Shangri-La Summit Wing Hotel (Beijing), and leading his own Latin jazz band MUSA's Trio with bass/ double bassist Lautaro "LuKa" Bellucca and drummer/ percussionist Adriano "Gaofei" Moreira. In the 3rd quarter of 2011, accompanied by LuKa and Gaofei, Musa moved to Taipei to join Gary Chaw Project SENSATION (the band, so as a music project) as the key pianist and composer with the Malaysian Chinese vocalist Gary Chaw and Taiwanese compose-producer Michael Tu.

Musa is now living in Taipei as his new home and working location, continued to play music in local jazz bars and venues with his bandmates and different musicians, at the same time collaborating with mainstream record labels and artists in live performing or recording albums.

== Releases ==
- Album

3690 - debut studio album - Aug 16 2013

No.	Title	Length
1.	"Blues for Labrusca"	5:19
2.	"Distance"	8:13
3.	"Mamila"	7:15
4.	"Knetliges"	7:01
5.	"The Excuse"	3:15
6.	"Latineando!" (Bellucca)	5:32
7.	"3690"	4:05
8.	"Eyes to Heaven feat. Mandy Gaines" (Gaines)	5:31

3690 PRODUCTION NOTE

All tracks: Piano by Martin Musaubach; Bass /Double Bass by Lautaro Bellucca; Drums & Percussion by Adriano Moreira
Track 1-5: written and arranged by Martin Musaubach
Track 6: written by Lautaro Bellucca, arranged by Martin Musaubach
Track 7: written by Martin Musaubach; arranged by Martin Musaubach & Michael Tu
Track 8: written and vocal by Mandy Gaines; arranged by Martin Musaubach; erhu by Tanghsuan Lo; guitars by Fabio Moreira

Release: (noted) Aug 16 2013; (in stores) Aug 23 2013
Publish label: AsiaMuse Entertainment
Producer: Martin Musaubach
Executive producer: Michael Tu
Recording engineer: Micky Yang and Alex Lee
Mastering engineer: Michael Tu

Track 1-7 recorded in Megaforce Studios, Taipei
Track 8 recorded in Platinum Studio, Taipei

== See also ==
- MUSA's
- SENSATION
