= MUSA's =

- Origin: Argentina
- Genres: Latin, Jazz, Blues, Fusion
- Years active: 2007–present

MUSA's is a musical band led by piano/ keyboardist Martin "Musa" Musaubach. Members combination in MUSA's varies in different live shows.

While the band members' origins are from different countries, currently they are usually staying in Taipei, Taiwan, playing lives, producing self-own projects or collaborating with different musicians and vocalists as the leading band.

== About ==
=== 2007 - 2011: MUSA's Trio ===
The Argentine band was formed in 2007 as trio, with pianist Martin "Musa" Musaubach; bassist/ double bassist Lautaro "LuKa" Bellucca; and drummer/ percussionist José Centorbi.

From Latin to Jazz, R&B and Rock, the band traveled to China and contracted to perform in shows, festivals, lives and recording in cities including Shenzhen, Hong Kong, Kunming, Shanghai and Beijing. In Beijing they performed as the house band of Shangri-La Summit Wing Hotel in Guo Mao, Chaoyang Area.

From composing to arrangement and playing the music live, the trio shares their passion towards jazz, Latin jazz, blues or fusion to the audience in every second they are with their instruments.

In 2007, Gaofei met Musa and LuKa when he was still performing in BR Connection (also with guitarist Fabio Moreira) during an open performance in Shenzhen China. Gaofei joined Musa and LuKa as drummer for the new MUSA'S Trio when José left the band in 2010.

The new trio moved and settled in Taipei starting from the 3rd quarter of 2011.

=== From 2011: MUSA's Trio x Gary Chaw Project SENSATION ===
In 2011, Michael Tu, a famous music producer in Taiwan, introduced MUSA's Trio to the Malaysian singer & vocalist Gary Chaw. Shortly and naturally, they knew and became friends of each other with some brief communication in music.

Starting from music, presented by the vocalist Gary Chaw, the producer Michael Tu and MUSA's Trio, SENSATION was formed. This title for the group is not only a band, but a music concept and a "label", showing different possibilities and creativity in music. The group remains the "formula" of "Gary Chaw + MUSA's Trio = SENSATION" throughout the production. They "secretly" performed in Riverside Café Taipei once in 2011 for their debut.

From December 2011 to early January in 2012, Gary Chaw, with MUSA's Trio and Michael Tu, presented the Gary Chaw SENSATION x JAZZ concerts in Taipei, Kaohsiung and Taichung. At the same time there came the limited single Project Sensation JAZZ solely available in the live hall and online music showcase, including All I Have To Do Is Dream and I Just Called To Say I Love You. The songs are newly arranged by MUSA's Trio, and the single also included 2 instrumental tracks of the songs played by the trio.

In June 2012, MUSA's Trio with Gary Chaw as SENSATION released their debut album Gary Chaw Project Sensation 1 Jazz, with arrangements and instrumentals done by MUSA's Trio. Kicked off on July 14 at Taipei, soon enough the SENSATION Jazz Concert (「SENSATION 爵士音樂會」) was also presented in Singapore and Malaysia, as the warm-up towards the Gary Chaw Sensational Sound Concert in Hong Kong Coliseum in August.

Though not being noted as SENSATION, the trio band members actually involved in the album production for Gary Chaw in his latest work Hollywood Zoo, accompanying and arranging the instrumental of the tracks.

=== 2013: MU5A's the Quintet and expansion ===
Since the 4th quarter in 2012, MUSA's Trio started collaborating with different musicians, fusing new possibilities in their careers, particularly in live playing as leader or sidemen for various collaborators.

In April 2013, the guitarist Fabio Moreira joined MUSA's Trio as the quartet member for live shows and the band soon started new recording in SENSATION Project 2 for Gary Chaw. In June the trio welcomed the joining of Fabio and in August, Danny, thus expanding the band as MUS4's (quartet) and MU5A's (quintet) - a small jazz ensemble with complete rhythm section and lead instruments consists of percussionist, bassist, pianist, guitarist and trumpeter.

From 2013 summer onwards, when MUSA's members are performing with the vocalists of DFM, Shiny Lv and Norma, the group will be also remarked as DFM Jazz Club. From time to time varying the group combination from quartet to quintet as well as collaborating with different musicians in projects, meanwhile MUSA's members are constantly joining different music shows as solo sideman or in full group, recordings and hosting open jam in different venues in Taipei.

Musa's first studio album, 3690, released in August 2013 with key personnel in the production including LuKa and Gaofei, set off the debut studio release for the originals MUSA's Trio and key members in the band as new band-leading musicians.

== Members ==
Frequent personnel

- Martin "Musa" Musaubach - piano, keyboard, producer
- Adriano "Gaofei" Moreira - drums and percussion
- Fabio Moreira - guitar
- Danny Deysher - trumpet and flügelhorn

Bassist (MUSA's 2013/09~)

- Vincent Hsu
- Michael Ning

Past members

- José Centorbi - drums and percussion (2007 - 2010)
- Lautaro "LuKa" Bellucca - bass and double bass (- 2013)

== Releases ==
Single

- Project Sensation JAZZ - with Gary Chaw - studio album (Dec 2012)

Album

- Gary Chaw Project Sensation 1 Jazz - with Gary Chaw - studio album (Jun 2012)
- Hollywood Zoo - with Gary Chaw - studio album (Dec 2012)
- 3690 - Martin Musaubach - studio album (released Aug 16 2013 under AsiaMuse Entertainment)

DVD

- Live at the Spring City, Kunming 2010 (2010)

== Related Artists & Groups ==
- Gary Chaw
- SENSATION
