= Curse of the Golden Flower (EP) =

EP by Jay Chou
- Released: 7 December 2006
- Recorded: 2006
- Genre: Mandopop
- Language: Mandarin
- Label: Alfa Music，Sony BMG
- Producer: Jay Chou

Jay Chou chronology
Still Fantasy (2006)	Curse of the Golden Flower (2006)	Secret (2007)

Curse of the Golden Flower (traditional Chinese: 黃金甲; simplified Chinese: 黄金甲; pinyin: Huáng jīn jiǎ) is the fourth EP by Taiwanese singer Jay Chou, released on 7 December 2006 by Alfa Music and Sony BMG.

== Track listing ==
1. "Golden Armor" (黃金甲)
2. "Chrysanthemum Terrace" (Piano Version) (菊花台（鋼琴演奏版）)

Bonus MVs from Still Fantasy

1. "7th Chapter of the Night" (夜的第七章)
2. "Listen to Mom" (聽媽媽的話)
3. "A Thousand Miles Away" (千里之外)
4. "Herbalist Manual" (本草綱目)
5. "A Step Back" (退後)
6. "Red Imitation" (紅模仿)
7. "Heart's Rain" (心雨)
8. "White Windmill" (白色風車)
9. "Rosemary" (迷迭香)
10. "Chrysanthemum Terrace" (菊花台)
