= Ting Zhu (mechanical engineer) =

Chinese mechanical engineer

Ting Zhu is a Chinese mechanical engineer.

Zhu earned a bachelor's degree in 1995, and his first PhD four years later, both from Tsinghua University. He then moved to the United States and completed a second doctorate at Massachusetts Institute of Technology in 2004. After pursuing postdoctoral research at Harvard University, Zhu joined the Georgia Institute of Technology faculty in 2005, where he currently holds a Woodruff Professorship and the Carter N. Paden, Jr. Distinguished Chair.
