= Still Fantasy =

Studio album by Jay Chou
- Released: 5 September 2006
- Recorded: 2006
- Genre: Mandopop
- Length: 41:35
- Language: Mandarin
- Labels: Alfa; Sony BMG
- Producer: Jay Chou

Jay Chou chronology
Fearless (2006)	Still Fantasy (2006)	Curse of the Golden Flower (2006)

Alternative cover

Singles from Still Fantasy
- 1. "Far Away" Released: 24 August 2006; 2. "A Step Back" Released: 5 September 2006; 3. "Listen to Mom" Released: 5 September 2006

Still Fantasy (Chinese: 依然范特西; pinyin: Yī rán fàn tè xī) is the seventh studio album by Taiwanese singer-songwriter Jay Chou, released on 5 September 2006 by Alfa Music and Sony BMG.

== Background and release ==
On 23 August 2006, the album was made available for pre-order. Those who pre-ordered at record stores received a poster, while those who pre-ordered at 7-Eleven convenience stores received a jigsaw puzzle. A cell phone chain was also included.

During its production, Still Fantasy was leaked online. As a result, Alfa Music cut the pre-order period short, ending it three days earlier on 7 September, and moved the album's release date forward by three days.

== Commercial performance ==
"Far Away" reached second place on the 2006 Hit FM Top 100 Singles of the Year list, with "Listen to Mom" ranking 8th and "White Windmill" at 53rd. Upon its release, the album debuted at number one on the G-Music combo album chart in its first week (1–7 September 2006), recording 45.98% of the Chinese sales and 25.93% of the overall sales for that week. It maintained the top spot on both charts for three consecutive weeks (1–28 September 2006), and remained in the top 20 of the Chinese Chart for a total of 24 weeks and the Comprehensive Chart for 18 weeks.

The Hong Kong International Federation of the Phonographic Industry (IFPIHK) named Still Fantasy one of the top ten best-selling Mandarin albums of 2006, and it was the best-selling Mandarin album of that year.

== Music videos and promotion ==
Music videos were produced for all ten songs on the album, each directed by Chou himself. The DVD of Still Fantasy features extended versions of the music videos for "Far Away" and "The Seventh Chapter of the Night." The music videos for the remaining eight songs were later included in the Curse of the Golden Flower EP, with "Far Away" and "The Seventh Chapter of the Night" appearing in their standard versions.

The music video for "Far Away" features Cherry Hsia as a singer, while Chou portrays a waiter who falls in love with her. The storyline depicts Hsia leaving the theater, only to return three years later to find that the waiter still treasures the handkerchief she gave him, though he is too shy to face her.

The video for "The Seventh Chapter of the Night" was filmed in London, England. The lyrics tell a Sherlock Holmes-inspired story, with Chou playing the detective in the video. Yu Hao from Nan Quan Mama plays his assistant, investigating the murder of the "Blue Demon." Another Nan Quan Mama member, Dantou, plays the suspect. The music video for "Step Back" features Hebe Tien from S.H.E. In the video, Chou plays a gangster and Hebe plays a juice seller known as "Juice Girl." The storyline follows the gangster who frequently buys juice from her stand.

== Accolades ==
The album was nominated for three Golden Melody Awards. The album also won an IFPI Hong Kong Top Sales Music Award for Best Selling Mandarin Album of the Year. The track "Chrysanthemum Terrace" won a Hong Kong Film Award for Best Original Film Song.

Awards and nominations
Year	Award	Category	Nominee	Result
2006	Chinese Musicians Exchange Association	Top 10 Albums of the Year	Still Fantasy	Won
2006	Chinese Musicians Exchange Association	Top 10 Singles of the Year	"Chrysanthemum Terrace"	Won
2007	Golden Melody Awards	Song of the Year	"Far Away"	Nominated
2007	Golden Melody Awards	Best Music Video	"Moulin Rouge"	Nominated
2007	IFPI Hong Kong Sales Awards	Highest Selling Mandarin Album	Still Fantasy	Won
2007	IFPI Hong Kong Sales Awards	Top 10 Mandarin Albums	Still Fantasy	Won

== Track listing ==
All music is composed by Jay Chou.

No.	Title	Lyrics	Length
1.	"Chapter Seven" (夜的第七章)	Alang Huang	3:48
2.	"Listen to Mom" (聽媽媽的話)	Jay Chou	4:25
3.	"Far Away" (千里之外 feat. Fei Yu-ching)	Vincent Fang	4:16
4.	"Herbalist Manual" (本草綱目)	Vincent Fang	3:29
5.	"A Step Back" (退後)	Devon Song	4:21
6.	"Moulin Rouge" (紅模仿)	Jay Chou	3:05
7.	"Rainy Mood" (心雨)	Vincent Fang	4:29
8.	"White Windmill" (白色風車)	Jay Chou	4:32
9.	"Rosemary" (迷迭香)	Vincent Fang	4:11
10.	"Chrysanthemum Terrace" (菊花台)	Vincent Fang	4:53
Total length:			41:35

== Charts ==
=== Weekly charts ===
Chart (2006)	Peak position
Japanese Albums (Oricon)	63
Malaysian Chinese Albums (RIM)	2
Taiwanese Albums (G-Music)	1

=== Year-end charts ===
Chart (2006)	Position
Taiwanese Albums (Note: Best-selling albums of the year in Taiwan as reported by media outlets)	2

== Sales ==
Region	Certification	Certified units/sales
Taiwan	—	250,000
