= On the Run (Jay Chou album) =

On the Run!

Studio album by Jay Chou
- Released: 2 November 2007
- Recorded: 2007
- Genres: Pop; R&B
- Length: 39:10
- Language: Mandarin
- Labels: JVR; Sony BMG
- Producer: Jay Chou

Jay Chou chronology
| Secret (2007) | On the Run! (2007) | 2007 The World Tour (2008) |

Singles from Capricorn
- 1. "Cowboy On the Run" Released: 10 October 2007; 2. "Blue and White Porcelain" Released: 2 November 2007; 3. "Rainbow" Released: 2 November 2007; 4. "Sunshine Nerd" Released: 2 November 2007

On the Run! or known as I'm Very Busy (Chinese: 我很忙; pinyin: Wǒ hěn máng) is the eighth studio album by Taiwanese singer-songwriter Jay Chou, released on 2 November 2007 by JVR Music & Sony BMG. It features various tracks including "Blue and White Porcelain", "Rainbow", and "A Dandelion's Promise".

== Background and development ==
On the Run! is Chou's first album released under his self-founded label, JVR Music. After his contract with his former company expired, Chou chose not to renew and instead launched his own label. Chou subsequently found himself frequently occupied with managing the company, concert performances, commercials, and movies; it was from then where the concept of the album emerged. Chou noted that the album title served as a form of self-mockery, reflecting both his hectic lifestyle and a sense of helplessness with constant demands.

Talking about the album's development, Chou commented, "Generally, the creation of my album usually starts with music before the concept, but this time I did it the other way around. I came up with ideas of the concepts first and the style was more western and retro. I have never tried this style in any of my previous albums, and I like it very much."

== Songs ==
"Cowboy on the Run" embodies an American Western cowboy motif. It portrays a cowboy who "only drinks milk and not wine, and only rides donkeys and not horses." Unlike the often somber and reflective cowboys in media, Chou sought to portray a dynamic cowboy driven by a strong sense of justice. The love song "Rainbow" features a simple guitar melody that evokes a bittersweet feeling, while "Blue and White Porcelain" utilizes traditional Jiangnan opera styles.

== Commercial performance ==
On the Run! was commercially successful. It debuted at number one on the G-Music combo album chart in Taiwan during the week of 8 November 2007. Across Asia, the album sold 1,070,000 copies within one day of becoming available. In Singapore, the album was certified platinum for exceeding sales of 10,000 units. The tracks, "Cowboy is Very Busy", "Rainbow", and "Sunshine Nerd", are listed at number 11, number 28, and number 59 respectively on the Hit FM Top 100 Singles of the Year chart.

== Accolades ==
The album was nominated for five Golden Melody Awards and won Song of the Year, Best Composer, and Best Lyricist for "Blue and White Porcelain". The album also won an IFPI Hong Kong Top Sales Music Award for Top 10 Best Selling Mandarin Album of the Year.

| Year | Award | Category | Nominated work | Result |
|---|---|---|---|---|
| 2008 | Golden Melody Awards | Song of the Year | "Blue and White Porcelain" | Won |
| 2008 | Golden Melody Awards | Best Mandarin Album | On the Run! | Nominated |
| 2008 | Golden Melody Awards | Best Composer | Jay Chou for "Blue and White Porcelain" | Won |
| 2008 | Golden Melody Awards | Best Lyricist | Vincent Fang for "Blue and White Porcelain" | Won |
| 2008 | Golden Melody Awards | Best Musical Arranger | Baby Chung for "Blue and White Porcelain" | Nominated |

== Track listing ==
All music is composed by Jay Chou.

On the Run! – Standard edition
| No. | Title | Lyrics | Length |
|---|---|---|---|
| 1. | "Cowboy On the Run" (牛仔很忙) | Alang Huang | 2:46 |
| 2. | "Rainbow" (彩虹) | Jay Chou | 4:21 |
| 3. | "Blue and White Porcelain" (青花瓷) | Vincent Fang | 3:57 |
| 4. | "Sunshine Nerd" (陽光宅男) | Vincent Fang | 3:40 |
| 5. | "A Dandelion's Promise" (蒲公英的約定) | Vincent Fang | 4:05 |
| 6. | "Incomparable" (無雙) | Vincent Fang | 3:51 |
| 7. | "Not Good Enough for You" (我不配) | Vincent Fang | 4:46 |
| 8. | "Pull Apart" (扯) | Vincent Fang | 3:28 |
| 9. | "Sweet" (甜甜的) | Vincent Fang | 4:01 |
| 10. | "The Longest Movie" (最長的電影) | Jay Chou | 3:55 |
| Total length: | | | 38:50 |

On the Run! – DVD
| No. | Title | Length |
|---|---|---|
| 1. | "Cowboy on the Run" (牛仔很忙) |
| 2. | "Not Good Enough for You" (我不配) |
| Total length: | | 0:00 |

== Charts ==
=== Weekly charts ===
| Chart (2007) | Peak position |
|---|---|
| Taiwanese Albums (G-Music) | 1 |

=== Year-end charts ===
| Chart (2007) | Position |
|---|---|
| Taiwanese Albums (Note: Best-selling albums of the year in Taiwan as reported by media outlets) | 2 |

== Sales and certifications ==
| Region | Certification | Certified units/sales |
|---|---|---|
| Singapore (RIAS) | Platinum | 10,000^{*} |
Summaries
| Asia | — | 1,070,000 |
^{*} Sales figures based on certification alone.
