= Super Sunshine =

Studio album by Gary Chaw
- Released: 4 January 2008
- Genre: Mandarin pop
- Label: Rock Records

Gary Chaw chronology
Superman (2006)	Super Sunshine (2008)	Supermarket (2009)

Super Sunshine is Gary Chaw's third album was released on 4 January 2008.

== Track listing ==
- All songs composed by Gary Chaw; "Super Sunshine" contains sample of Jimmie Davis' composition (or Traditional Ukrainian folk melody) "You Are My Sunshine"; "你的歌" contains samples of previously Gary Chaw's own songs.
- Lyricists are listed below.
1. Super Sunshine
  Lyricist: 阿丹
2. 起床歌
  Lyricists: Gary Chaw/阿丹
3. 無辜
  Lyricist: 王中言
4. 妹妹要快樂
  Lyricist: 鄔裕康
5. 吹吹風
  Lyricists: Gary Chaw/阿丹
6. 奈斯男孩
  Lyricist: 阿丹
7. 單數
  Lyricist: 李焯雄
8. 愛到最後一秒也不委屈
  Lyricist: 姚謙
9. 愛愛
  Lyricist: 鄔裕康
10. 愛的弧度
  Lyricist: 林夕
11. 你的歌
  Lyricist: Gary Chaw
