= Ting Chu =

Jasmine
- Born: January 5, 1981 (age 44); Taipei, Taiwan
- Occupation: Singer-songwriter
- Years active: 2007–present
- Musical career
- Also known as: Ting Chu
- Origin: Taiwan
- Genres: Mandarin pop
- Instruments: Guitar, piano
- Labels: HummingBird Music (2004–present)
- Website: www.tingchu.com

Jasmine (Chinese: 庭竹; pinyin: Tíng Zhú; born January 5, 1981), also known as Ting Chu, is a singer-songwriter who made her debut in the Taiwanese music industry in 2007. She has a contract under start-up recording company HummingBird Music, the same company Hong Kong–based band Soler belongs to.

== Early life ==
Jasmine was born in Taipei, Taiwan, on January 5, 1981. She began songwriting in her teenage years after her uncle died. She wrote her first work, "Blessing", after learning to play the guitar. When she entered university, she continued writing music and performing at bars and coffee shops. Upon graduation, she entered into the Musicians Institute in Los Angeles, California. She was discovered by Hong Kong music producer and Musicians Institute faculty member Lupo Groining, who offered her a contract with HummingBird Music.

== Debut ==
Jasmine named her album Yu Sheng – The Sound of Rain (simplified Chinese: 雨声; traditional Chinese: 雨聲) in honor of her idol, Taiwanese singer 張雨生 (Chang Yu-Sheng), using a homophone of Zhang's given name 雨生 (literally 'Rain-Life').

== Discography ==
1. Sound of Rain (雨聲) – April 3, 2007
2. Ai De Jiu Gong Ge (爱的九宫格) – March 1, 2011
