= Cherry Boom =

Taiwanese alternative rock band

- Origin: Taipei, Taiwan
- Genres: Alternative rock C-rock; C-pop
- Years active: 2005–2011
- Labels: Universal Music Group (Taiwan)
- Members: Zhazha (查查); Gua (瓜); Xiaoqian (小倩); Datian (大恬)
- Website: Cherry Boom Official Site

Cherry Boom (simplified Chinese: 樱桃帮; traditional Chinese: 櫻桃幫; pinyin: Yīngtáo Bāng) was an all-female Taiwanese alternative rock band formed by four students of Fu-Jen Catholic University, a university also previously attended by Taiwanese pop singer Jolin Tsai and pop band F.I.R. vocalist Faye Zhan. In 2006, Cherry Boom released their debut album My Dear Prince. Later in 2007, they released their second album, Goody-Goody. The band disbanded after the release of their third album.

== Members ==
- Zha Jiawen (查家雯) or Lena Cha, stage name Zhazha (查查), vocalist
- Liao Yijia (廖宜佳), stage name Gua (瓜), guitarist
- Xu Ruoqian (許若倩), stage name Xiaoqian (小倩), bass player
- Feng Kangtian (馮康恬), stage name Datian (大恬), drummer
- Eva Abou Samra & Nancy Asmar – Back up singers (大恬)

== Post Cherry Boom ==
After Cherry Boom disbanded, Lena Cha started her solo project Astro Bunny (原子邦妮) with bassist/producer Jay Cheng (程杰). Astro Bunny performed their first concert on 13 June 2012, at the Riverside Cafe (河岸留言) in Taipei and released their debut five-track EP "What If There's No Tomorrow" the same month. In an interview with the Taipei Times, Cha said, "We named the group 'bunny' because I love bunnies and I forced him to like them too," Cha laughed. "I picked the word "astro" because I'm an anime and computer game geek".

== Discography ==
=== Albums ===
Album #	Album information	Track listing
1st	My Dear Prince (親愛的王子): Released: 13 July 2006 (CD) 3 October 2006 (CD+DVD); Label: Universal Music Group	CD: 1. 清新早晨 (Fresh Morning); 2. 親愛的王子 (Dear Prince); 3. 秘密花園 (Secret Garden); 4. 再見我的愛 (Good-bye My Love); 5. 蝕月 (Lunar Eclipse); 6. I Wanna Rock; 7. 我的空氣 (My Breath); 8. 小丑世界 (A Little Clown's World); 9. 不對也要愛 (Must Love Though It's Not Right); 10. 黑夜來臨 (Coming of the Night); DVD: 1. 親愛的王子 (Dear Prince); 2. 再見我的愛 (Good-bye My Love); 3. I Wanna Rock; 4. 清新早晨 (Fresh Morning); 5. 黑夜來臨 (Coming of the Night); 6. 蝕月 (Lunar Eclipse)
2nd	Goody-Goody (乖乖): Released: 24 May 2007; Label: Universal Music Group	1. 乖乖 (Goody-Goody); 2. 你愛我嗎 (Do You Love Me?); 3. Green; 4. 七 (Seven); 5. 庭院 (Courtyard); 6. 受夠 (Enough); 7. 再一刺 (Stick at Me); 8. Liar; 9. 色彩 (Color); 10. 呼啦啦 (Hu-La-La)
3rd	Only: Released: 18 November 2010; Label: Universal Music Group	1. 瑪莉海 (Marry Sea); 2. Make It Better; 3. 看清 (See It Clearly); 4. 猜猜舞 (Guessing Dance); 5. I Am; 6. 櫻桃可樂 (Cherry Cola); 7. Interlude; 8. 私底下 (Private); 9. 公平交易 (Fair Trade); 10. 落花 (Dropping Petals); 11. Lie or Die
