= Gary Chaw =

Malaysian Chinese singer-songwriter

Gary Chaw ASDK
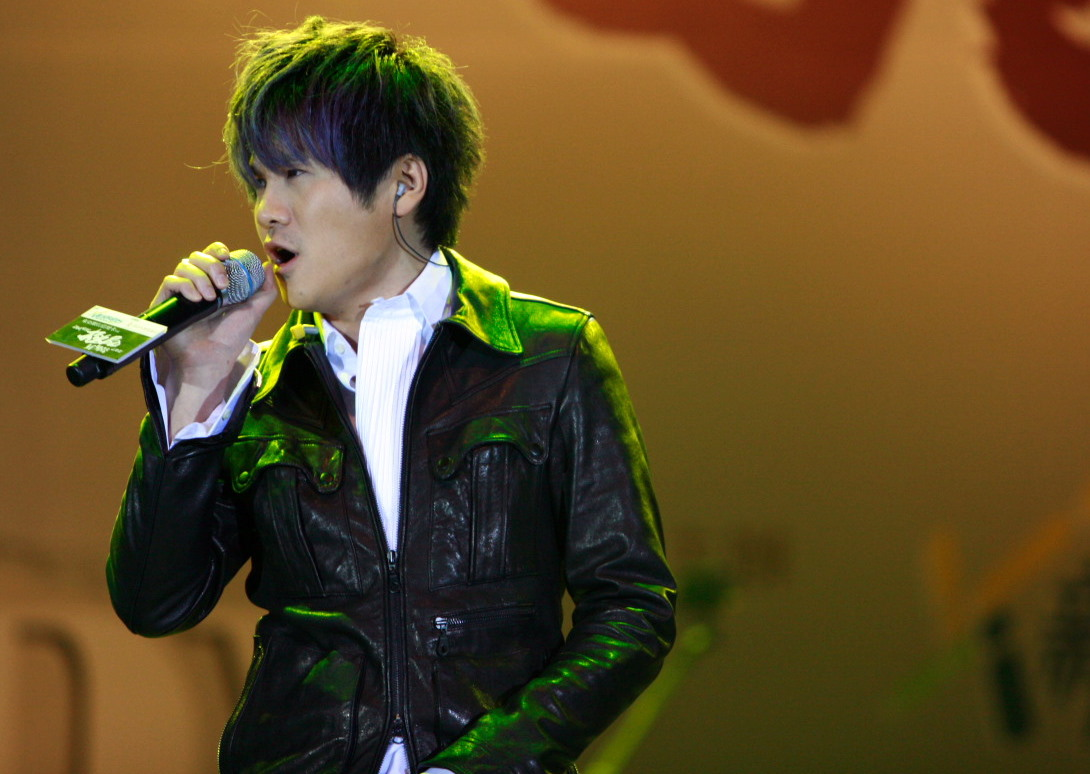
- Gary Chaw performing on 15 March 2009
- Born: Chaw Pak Haw; 9 July 1979 (age 47); Kota Belud, Sabah, Malaysia
- Occupation: Singer-songwriter
- Years active: 2005–present
- Spouse(s): Wu Sou Ling (Chinese: 吳速玲; pinyin: Wú Sùlíng) (m. 2008)
- Children: 2
- Awards: Golden Melody Awards – Best Male Mandarin Artist 2008 Super Sunshine
- Musical career
- Also known as: Gary Cao, Cao Ge
- Origin: Malaysia
- Genres: Mandopop, R&B
- Instrument: Piano
- Label: Rock Records

Gary Chaw
- Chinese: 曹格
Transcriptions
Yue: Cantonese
- Jyutping: Cou4 Gaak3

Alternative Chinese name
- Traditional Chinese: 曹佰豪
Transcriptions
Yue: Cantonese
- Jyutping: Cou4 Baak3 Hou4

Gary Chaw (Chinese: 曹格; Jyutping: Cou4 Gaak3; born 9 July 1979 in Kota Belud, Sabah, Malaysia), also known as Gary Cao or Cao Ge or by his alter ego Cao Xiaoge, is a Malaysian Chinese singer-songwriter based in Taiwan, who has had achieved success in Taiwan, mainland China, Malaysia, Hong Kong, and Singapore. He is renowned for his stage presence, wide vocal range, and rich voice. In addition, he composes for himself and other singers.

== Early life ==
Chaw lived with his grandfather since he was 11 months old as his parents separated when he was 9 months old. He received his early education in Canada when he was 9. He later went on to continue his studies in engineering at the University of Auckland in New Zealand. However, he left New Zealand before completing his studies. He can speak Mandarin, Cantonese, English, French, Hakka, Hokkien & Malay fluently.

== Career ==
=== Music ===
In 2010 he joined BMA and has since been dubbed "Asia Best Male Singer" by the media. His most recent concert tour of Asia, "Welcome to My World" was a great success. Chaw is renowned for his impressive vocal range, such that he was considered androgynous when he made his debut. He has often covered songs that ranged from tenor, such as "Moon River", to songs that are mezzo-soprano range, such as "Ting Hai". Including chest and mix voices, his vocal range is from G3 to C6. He also sang "My Way" by Frank Sinatra switching between low tenor to countertenor range.

In 2008 he composed and sang a song for the 2008 Beijing Olympics that was released in a Rock records CD called "Far away" (一起飞). The album was titled after the song he composed. Other Rock Records artists that took part include Genie Zhuo, 2moro, Alien Huang, Tracy Zhou.

In 2006 Chaw won Hong Kong TVB8's Best Newcomer Singer award. His big break occurred with the release of his Mandarin version of Karyn White's 1988 song "Superwoman". With this song, he won the Best Mandarin Male singer in the 19th Golden Melody Awards. Since then he has released a number of albums.

Gary has written some chart-topping songs in Taiwan sung by S.H.E, Cyndi Wang, and Aaron Kwok (Aaron already had accepted songs written by him as early as his first EP, before Gary even started his career back in Malaysia). In a recent interview with MTV, Chaw admitted (fluently in English) that he is a shy guy who does not express himself well through words but relatively well enough in the songs he sings. His early influences came from admiration of Stevie Wonder and R. Kelly.

=== Early years ===
Ting Hai, a song originally sung by A-Mei, was also a song he sang at a KTV bar in Malaysia in its original key right in front of its composer and arranger, Michael Tu (涂惠源), and he became his reference and supporter to start his career in Taiwan back in 2001. (The other two songs he sang that night was Dark Humor by Jay Chou and Duo De Ta by Faye Wong (Cantonese version of "SuperWoman.) In 2002 Chaw left his home in Malaysia to go to Taiwan with hopes of joining the entertainment show business. He purchased a one-way plane ticket and brought with him only around RM1,600 (about HK$4,000). He tried to get into numerous record companies who criticised him harshly for being ugly and lacking talent. After many failures Chaw became an alcoholic, battled insomnia, unemployment, suffered from severe depression, loss of friends and confidence. He soon hit rock bottom when he attempted suicide by sedative overdose. It was only in 2004 that he was signed by Rock Records when he recovered from insomnia, but his alcohol-fuelled incidents still plagued him until 2013 when he finally decided to give up drinking.

One day Chaw went out to Shilin Night Market and stumbled across a stray cat. He took this cat home and raised it since they both were unwanted by society. He named it "Lin Lin" and wrote a song for the cat "The world's only you" (世界唯一的你). From then on, his career completely changed. After three years of hard work, he signed with Rock Records.

=== Project SENSATION ===
Approaching the end of 2011, Chaw, along with his producer & teacher, Michael Tu (涂惠源), launched "Project SENSATION" – a new experimental music project or the more appropriately, a new music label. At the same time the band released a limited debut single "All I Have to Do is Dream", solely available in the 1st mini-concert of SENSATION. The new-formed band members included Gary (vo.), and members from MUSA's: Martin "Musa" Musaubach (piano), Lautaro "LuKa" Bellucca (bass & double bass) & Adriano "Gaofei" Moreira (drums & percussions)

In 2012 June, "Gary Chaw Project Sensation 1: JAZZ" released. Soon enough the band started their tour in Taiwan, Singapore, Malaysia and Hong Kong during the summertime.

=== Competition Singer and in the Chinese market (2014-present) ===
In 2014, Chaw entered I Am A Singer 2, and was the first singer to be eliminated, but returned on the repêchage to finish in the top 5.

In 2015, Chaw entered The Chinese version of The Masked Singer, using the mask of Sun Wukong as a disguise, but was instantly recognised by fans online due to his previous performances in other competitions or appearances. He was the first replacement singer, and came second in leg 2, while being eliminated in the first round in legs 3 and 4, meaning he is at risk of being eliminated from the competition in leg 5.

== Personal life ==
In 2008, Chaw married Taiwanese Wu Sou Ling. They have a son named Joe and a daughter named Grace, whose godfather is Alien Huang. In 2014, Chaw and his kids participated in season 2 of Where Are We Going, Dad?.

Chaw admitted to being bipolar and credited his wife for being supportive and penned the song "All I need" for his wife.

"I refused to accept that I had bipolar.I sought a second and third opinion before I finally came to terms with my condition."

— Gary Chaw, KKBOX

On 26 November 2022, Chaw announced his divorce with Wu.

== Awards and nominations ==
Year	Award	Category	Nomination	Result	Ref
2006	6th Global Chinese Music Awards	Outstanding Regional Artiste (Malaysia)	Gary Chaw	Won	
2006	Hong Kong TVB8 Awards	Best New Male Artist (Gold)	Gary Chaw	Won	
2006	Guang Zhou Golden Melody Awards	Best New Male Artist (Gold)	Gary Chaw	Won	
2006	Guang Zhou Golden Melody Awards	Top 10 Golden Melodies	"Superwoman"	Won	
2006	Malaysia Entertainment Association	Best Composer	"少年" with Guang Liang	Won	
2006	Malaysia Entertainment Association	Top 10 Original Songs	"少年" with Guang Liang	Won	
2007	18th Golden Melody Awards	Best Male Mandarin Singer	Gary Chaw	Nominated	
2007	7th Music Chart Awards	Best New Artist	Gary Chaw	Won	
2007	Metro Radio Mandarin Music Awards	Best Performance (最佳演繹獎)	Gary Chaw	Won	
2007	Metro Radio Mandarin Music Awards	Best Karaoke Song	"兩隻戀人" (Two Lovers)	Won	
2008	19th Golden Melody Awards	Best Male Mandarin Singer	Gary Chaw	Won	

== Discography ==
- Self-titled album 曹格同名專輯 (2001)
- Blue 格格 Blue (2006)
- Superman (2006)
- Super Sunshine (2008)
- Supermarket (2009)
- Back in Control 曹之在我 (2010)
- Sensation (EP) (2011)
- Gary Chaw Project Sensation 1: JAZZ (2012)
- Hollywood Zoo (2012)
- Super Junior (2019)

== Filmography ==
- Where Are We Going? Dad 2 (2015)
- Let's Go! (2011)
- Ice Kacang Puppy Love 初戀紅豆冰 (2010)

== Honours ==
- Sabah
  - Companion of the Order of Kinabalu (ASDK) (2024)
