= Ady An =

Taiwanese actress and singer

- Born: Wu Wen-ching (吳玟靜); 29 September 1980 (age 46); Taipei, Taiwan
- Occupations: Actress; singer
- Years active: 2001–present
- Agent: Huayi Brothers
- Spouse: Levo Chen (m. 2017)
- Children: 2
- Relatives: cousin: Wan Wei Qiao (萬瑋喬)

Chinese name
- Traditional Chinese: 安以軒
- Simplified Chinese: 安以轩
Transcriptions
Standard Mandarin
- Hanyu Pinyin: Ān Yǐxuān

Ady An Yi-xuan (simplified Chinese: 安以轩; traditional Chinese: 安以軒; pinyin: Ān Yǐ Xuān; born simplified Chinese: 吴玟静; traditional Chinese: 吳玟靜; pinyin: Wú Wénjìng on 29 September 1980) is a Taiwanese actress and singer. She is known for TV dramas The Outsiders (2004), Chinese Paladin (2005), and Autumn's Concerto (2009).

== Career ==
An was born into a wealthy family in Taipei. Her father runs a security company, while her grandmother and aunt are major landlords in Taipei. An's parents divorced when she was four, and both her parents remarried. She and her mother stopped seeing each other, and she was raised in a strict manner by her father and stepmother. Her cousin is actress Wan Wei Qiao.

An debuted in 2000 with the TV drama Spicy Teacher. She rose to fame in 2004 after starring in the youth idol drama The Outsiders opposite Dylan Kuo. She broke into mainland China shortly after by starring in the TV drama Chinese Paladin, an adaptation of the fantasy RPG The Legend of Sword and Fairy. Since then, she had been actively involved in both Chinese and Taiwanese productions, such as The Legend of Hero (2005), Fox Volant of the Snowy Mountain (2006), Fast Track Love (2006), The Great Revival (2007), and Yun Niang (2008).

In 2009, she signed with Huayi Brothers, and was cast as Zhao Min in the wuxia drama The Heaven Sword and Dragon Saber, an adaptation of the novel of the same title by Louis Cha. While the wuxia drama met with a lukewarm reception, An found success that same year in the Taiwanese idol drama Autumn's Concerto, starring opposite Vanness Wu. In 2011, An played in two TV adaptations of China's Four Classic Novels, All Men Are Brothers and Journey to the West. In 2012, she reunited with Chinese Paladin co-star Hu Ge in short film Refresh 3+7. She starred in idol drama Go, Single Lady.(2014) alongside Mike He.

An retired from acting after her marriage in 2017.

== Personal life ==
An's known as the head of her group of celebrity friends, collectively known as An Corporation, including Joe Chen, Shone An, Esther Liu, Bianca Bai, Linda Liao and Kimi Hsia.

On March 15, 2017, An announced her marriage to Macau businessman Levo Chen, the boss of Macau's second biggest casino junket, whom she met in late 2014. They held their wedding on 5 June in Hawaii, as Chen is nicknamed 65. They have a son, Ace, nicknamed "66", born in 2019, and a daughter, Aira, nicknamed "Wa-bao", born in 2020. In January 2022, Chen was arrested in Macau, reportedly for his involvement in the case of Alvin Chau. On April 21, 2023, Macau Primary Court’s first-instance verdict sentenced Chen to 14 years in prison on charges including illegal gambling, fraud, and money laundering. On November 28, 2024, Macau’s Court of Final Appeal upheld the original verdict, maintaining a 13-year prison sentence but reducing the fine from 2.4 billion HKD to 1.8 billion HKD. Because of the scandal, some of Ady An's previous works including Autumn's Concerto and The Heaven Sword and Dragon Saber (2009) are removed from streaming platforms.

== Filmography ==
=== Film ===
Year	English title	Mandarin title	Role	Notes
2003	Fengcheng	風城		
2003	Wangwei Jichengren	王位继承人	Ah Hua	
2004	Kung Fu Girls	空手道少女組	Huang Yiyi	
2010	Death and Glory in Changde	喋血孤城	Wan Qing	
2010	If You Are the One 2	非誠勿擾2	Xuan Xuan	
2011	Case Sensitive	敏感事件	Luo Xiaoni	
2012	Rhapsody of Marriage	結婚狂想曲	Yue Lin	
2012	Chrysanthemum to the Beast	给野兽献花	Yoyo	
2013	Saving General Yang	忠烈楊家將	Princess Chai	
2013	Control	控制	Mimi	
2014	Mr. Lucky	好命先生	Qin Sisi	
2014	One Day	有一天		Cameo
2014	Mystery	秘术	Su Meike	
2016	Spicy Hot in Love	爱情麻辣烫之情定终身		Cameo
2016	Perfect Imperfection	我是处女座	Ye Xiaomeng	
2018	The Outsiders			

=== Television ===
Year	English title	Mandarin title	Role	Notes
2000	Spicy Teacher	麻辣鮮師	Tang Keling	
2001	Marmalade Boy	橘子醬男孩	Li Mei	Cameo
2001	Taiwan Lingyi Shijian	台灣靈異事件	Lin Ling	
2002	Mala Gaoxiao Sheng	麻辣高校生	Ou Peiqi	
2002	Tianxia Wushuang	天下無雙	Shuang Shuang	Cameo
2003	Lanxing	藍星	Sun Lanxing	
2003	Wangpai Tianshi	王牌天使	Kang Jiarou	
2004	Single Dormitory	單身宿舍連環泡	Yu Ruoxue	
2004	Zhuifeng Shaonian	追風少年	Zhu Keli	
2004	The Outsiders	鬥魚	Pei Yuyan	
2004	The Outsiders II	鬥魚2	Pei Yuyan	
2004	Blazing Courage	火線任務	Li Jiajia	
2005	The Legend of Hero	中華英雄	Chen Jieyu	
2005	Chinese Paladin	仙劍奇俠傳	Lin Yueru	
2006	The Prince of Han Dynasty 3	大漢天子三	Huo Qilian	
2006	Fast Track Love	車神	Ouyang Qian	
2006	White Robe of Love	白袍之戀	Liu Yining	
2006	Fox Volant of the Snowy Mountain	雪山飛狐	Miao Ruolan	
2007	The Great Revival	臥薪嚐膽	Xi Shi	
2007	New Breath of Love	愛情新呼吸	Fan Lisha	
2007	Super Mates	超級男女	Du Xiaofeng	
2008	Yunniang	芸娘	Yun'er / Wei Yixian	
2009	Love Tribulations	鎖清秋	Du Lanyan	alternative title: Tiandi Burong (天地不容)
2009	Cowherd and Weaver Girl	牛郎织女	Weaver Girl	
2009	Autumn's Concerto	下一站，幸福	Liang Mucheng	
2009	The Heaven Sword and Dragon Saber	倚天屠龍記	Zhao Min	
2011	All Men Are Brothers	水滸傳	Li Shishi	
2011	Journey to the West	西遊記	White Bone Demoness	
2011	Fight and Love with a Terracotta Warrior	古今大戰秦俑情	Han Dong'er / Zhu Lili / Xu Xiaojing	
2011	The Emperor's Harem	后宫	Shao Chunhua / Li Ziyun	
2012	Wipe Out the Bandits of Wulong Mountain	新乌龙山剿匪记	A Xi Miaomiao	
2012	Refresh 3+7	刷新之喜宴	Xia Tian	
2013	The Princess	全民公主	Zhou Xiaotong	
2014	Bian Guan Feng Huo Qing	边关烽火情	Yang Fen	
2014	Go, Single Lady	真爱遇到他	Wang Manling	alternative title: My Pig Lady 上流俗女
2015	The Female Assassins	金钗谍影	Cai Die	
2015	Epiphyllum Dream	昙花梦	Ouyang Qian	
2016	Plastic Surgery Season	整容季	Celebrity patient	Cameo
2016	Decoded	解密	Chen Yu	Special appearance
2016	Demon Girl	半妖倾城	Ying Die	Cameo
2017	Royal Sister Returns	御姐归来		
2018	The Legend of Dugu	独孤天下	Dugu Banruo	

=== Music video appearances ===
Year	Artist	Song title
2003	B. A. D.	"My Fault"
2009	Tiger Hu	"Vacancy"
2011	Vanness Wu	"Aiya"

== Discography ==
=== Studio albums ===
Title	Album details	Track listing
I'm a Libra I'm天秤座	Released: May 13, 2007; Label: EMI Music; Formats: CD, digital download	Track listing: 1. 如果那天没有遇见你; 2. 天香; 3. 小脸进行曲; 4. 心跳零距离; 5. 妈妈 我很好; 6. 平底鞋

== Published works ==
- An, Ady (2004). Something Wild. Taipei: China Times Publishing. ISBN 957-13-4121-5.

== Awards and nominations ==
Year	Award	Category	Nominated work	Result
2011	6th Huading Awards	Best Actress (Legend)	A Terracotta Warrior	Nominated
2013	5th Macau International Movie Festival	Best Supporting Actress	Saving General Yang	Nominated
2016	8th Macau International Movie Festival	Best Actress	Perfect Imperfection	Nominated
