= Say I Love You =

Say I Love You may refer to:

- Say I Love You (manga), a 2008 manga series by Kanae Hazuki
- Say I Love You (2012 TV series), Japanese anime television series based on the manga series by Kanae Hazuki
- Say I Love You (2014 TV series) (Chinese: 勇敢說出我愛你, Yǒnggǎn Shuōchū Wǒ ài Nǐ) a 2014 Taiwanese idol drama starring Mike He and Alice Ke
- "Say I Love You" (song), a 1982 song by Eddy Grant from his album Walking on Sunshine
