= Behind Your Smile =

- Promotional poster
- Genre: Romance, Melodrama, Mystery
- Created by: Sanlih E-Television
- Written by: Du Xinyi, Wang Yuqi
- Directed by: Chen Ronghui
- Starring: Marcus Chang; Eugenie Liu; Sean Lee; Hongshi; Esther Yang
- Opening theme: He Isn't Worth It by Shi Shi
- Ending theme: Not Your Business by 831
- Country of origin: Republic of China (Taiwan)
- Original language: Mandarin
- No. of episodes: 19

Production
- Producer: Chen Huiying
- Production location: Taiwan
- Running time: 75 minutes
- Production companies: I Production Co. Ltd. Sanlih E-Television

Original release
- Network: TTV; SET Metro
- Release: 13 November 2016 – 19 March 2017

Behind Your Smile (Chinese: 浮士德的微笑; pinyin: Fúshìdé de wéixiào; lit. 'Faust's Smile') is a 2016 Taiwanese television series created and produced by Sanlih E-Television, starring Marcus Chang, Eugenie Liu, Sean Lee, Hongshi and Esther Yang. Filming began on October 15, 2016, and wrapped on March 15, 2017. It aired on TTV every Sunday at 10:00 pm starting November 13, 2016.

== Synopsis ==
Zhao Yiting lives a cold and meaningless life as he tries to pursue the only goal he knows: destroying the person who took everything from him. He lost his father because of Lin Man, he decides to take revenge on her. At the same time, Lin Man's daughter, Lei Xinyu, returns home to surprise her mother, but the woman has fled due to numerous charges against her. Xinyu is now destitute and has an angry mob after her, so Yiting helps her while harboring ulterior motives. However, since Xinyu is naive, gentle and kind, Yiting starts to get conflicted about his feelings for her and his desire for revenge.

== Cast ==
=== Main cast ===
- Marcus Chang as Zhao Yiting
- Eugenie Liu as Lei Xinyu
  - Liao Lingyi as child Xinyu
- Sean Lee as Zhong Qianren
- Hongshi as Tang Qianni
- Esther Yang as Jian Xiaoyue

=== Supporting cast ===
- Lin Jiawei as Chen Shihuan
- Kelly Ko as Lin Man
- Jian Chang as Tang Ansheng
- Chen Tingxuan as Pan Yunan
- Jian Yizhe as Lin Taishu
- Andrew Liu as Xu Shufan
- Gail Lin as Zhong Jialing, Qianren's mother
- Phil Yan as Su Zhongwen

=== Guest actors ===
- Wei Yicheng as Xiao Zhou (episodes 1–2)
- Lin Shien as owner (episode 1)
- Xue Hao as Xiao Fang (episode 1)
- Ye Huizhi as housekeeper (episode 2)
- Chen Wanhao as Li Taiqing (episode 2, 11)
- Candy Yang as Wu Shanhong (episode 3, 10, 16)
- Yin Zhongmin as prosecutor (episode 3)
- Luo Qihong as Yan Yuan (episode 3, 6–7)
- Tong Yijun as human trafficker and smuggler (episode 3)
- Ceng Zhengzhan as Council Member Luo (episode 4–6)
- Lan Weihua as Zhao Jian'an (episode 5–6, 8)
- Lan Zhongwen as bakery owner (episode 5)
- Hope Lin as Qianren's blind date woman (episode 8)
- You Xiaobai as Xiaobai (episode 8)
- ?? as Xiang Ying (episode 8)
- Wu Yun Ting as Yunan's college friend (episode 19)

== Soundtrack ==
Behind Your Smile Original TV Soundtrack (OST)

Soundtrack album by Various artists
- Released: 30 December 2016
- Genre: Mandopop
- Language: Mandarin
- Label: Rock Records

Behind Your Smile Original TV Soundtrack (OST) (浮士德的微笑 原聲帶) was released on 30 December 2016 by various artists under Rock Records. It contains 10 tracks total, in which 8 songs are various instrumental versions of the songs. The opening theme is track 1 "He Isn’t Worth It" by Shi Shi, while the closing theme is track 2 "Not Your Business" by 831.

=== Track listing ===
No.	Title	Singer(s)	Length
1.	"He Isn’t Worth It" (是他不配)	Shi Shi	3:58
2.	"Not Your Business" (不關你的事)	831	3:57
3.	"Play Tricks of the Wind and the Light" (風與光的捉弄)	Instrumental	2:55
4.	"Faust's Sorrowful" (浮士德的悲愴)	Instrumental	2:46
5.	"Warm North Wind" (溫暖北風)	Instrumental	2:07
6.	"Faust's Sadness" (浮士德的哀傷)	Instrumental	2:57
7.	"Dazzling Sun" (刺眼太陽)	Instrumental	3:04
8.	"Faust's Jealousy" (浮士德的嫉妒)	Instrumental	2:28
9.	"Confrontation of the North Wind and the Sun" (北風和太陽的對峙)	Instrumental	3:32
10.	"Faust's Romance" (浮士德的浪漫)	Instrumental	3:26

Songs not featured on the official soundtrack album.

1. Don't Panic by Shi Shi
2. Lost on The Way (迷些路) by Shi Shi feat. Matzka
3. A Late Goodnight (很晚的晚安) by Shi Shi
4. Revert (倒流) by Yisa Yu
5. The Last Love Song (最後一首情歌) by Nine Chen
6. The North Wind and the Sun (北風和太陽) by Alien Huang

== Ratings ==
In the ratings below, the highest rating for the show will be in red, and the lowest rating for the show will be in blue.

Episode #	Original broadcast date	Average audience share	Rank
1	November 13, 2016	1.10	2
2	November 20, 2016	1.40	1
3	November 27, 2016	1.60	1
4	December 4, 2016	1.60	1
5	December 11, 2016	1.45	1
6	December 18, 2016	1.29	1
7	December 25, 2016	1.40	1
8	January 1, 2017	1.66	1
9	January 8, 2017	1.57	1
10	January 15, 2017	1.46	1
11	January 22, 2017	1.53	1
12	January 29, 2017	1.06	2
13	February 5, 2017	1.43	1
14	February 12, 2017	1.40	1
15	February 19, 2017	1.22	1
16	February 26, 2017	1.65	1
17	March 5, 2017	1.48	1
18	March 12, 2017	1.38	1
19	March 19, 2017	1.73	1
Average		1.44	--

Competing dramas on rival channels airing at the same time slot were:

- CTV – Don't Dare to Dream
- FTV – Abula, Laugh For 24 Hours, Love God Karaoke, Long Vacation
- EBC – The King of Romance
