= Lene Lai =

Taiwanese actress and model

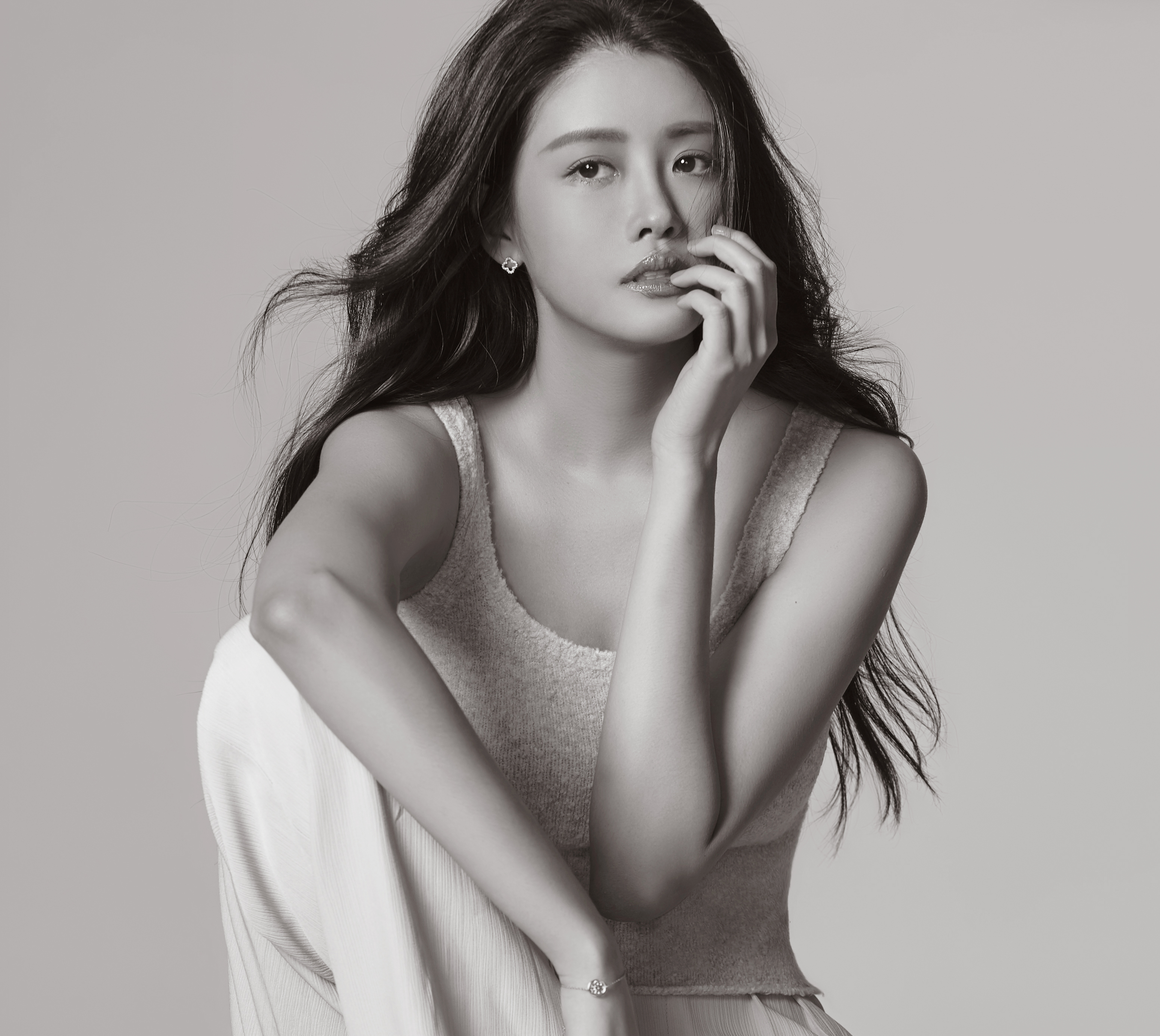
- Lai at Pleasantly Surprised event, October 2014
- Born: 6 June 1989 (age 36); Taipei, Taiwan
- Occupations: Actress, model
- Years active: 2006–present
- Spouse: Nylon Chen (m. 2017)
- Awards: Miss Asia Pageant 2008, 2nd Runner up
- Musical career

Lene Lai (Chinese: 賴琳恩; pinyin: Lài Lín'ēn; born 6 June 1989) is a Taiwanese actress and model. She was the 2nd runner-up of the Miss Asia Pageant 2008.

== Life and career ==
Lai studied at Tainan University of Technology, but she has since put her study on hold.

She participated in the television program Everybody Speaks Nonsenses II - Hot Pot. In 2006, she joined the variety show Blackie's Teenage Club. She has played small roles in television series My Queen and Bull Fighting.

Lai became the second Taiwanese to win a title from the Miss Asia Pageant. After winning the pageant, she was signed by Asia Television as an actress in 2009.

Lai is married to singer and actor Nylon Chen.

== Filmography ==
=== Film ===
- (Sex) Appeal (2014)
- The Regret (2013)
- Comedy Makes You Cry (2010)
- Invitation Only (2009)

=== Television ===
- Gamer’s Generation (2016)
- Refresh Man (2016)
- Love Cheque Charge (2014)
- Pleasantly Surprised (2014)
- King Flower (2013)
- Spring Love (2013)
- Ti Amo Chocolate (2012)
- Absolute Darling (2012)
- Love Keeps Going (2011)
- 4 Gifts (2010)
- My Queen (2009)
- Bull Fighting (2007)
- Summer x Summer (2007)
