= You Deserve to Be Single =

You Deserved to Be Single
- Directed by: Cai Xin
- Written by: Liu Yi; Cai Xin
- Produced by: Li Pei Sen
- Starring: Ruby Lin; Gao Fei; Mike He; David Wu
- Cinematography: Di Kun
- Edited by: Yang Ye, Jiang Yan Ming
- Music by: A Yan, Lui Qin
- Production companies: Beijing Golden Harvest Entertainment Co. Ltd; Star Shining TV & Art Co. Ltd
- Distributed by: Golden Harvest; China Film
- Release date: 13 June 2010
- Running time: 100 minutes
- Country: China
- Language: Mandarin

You Deserved to Be Single (Chinese: 活该你单身; pinyin: Huógāi Nǐ Dānshēn) or Huogai Ni Danshen is a 2010 Chinese film directed by Chinese female director Cai Xin who co-wrote the screenplay also. It stars Taiwanese actress Ruby Lin, Chinese actress Gao Fei, Taiwanese actor Mike He and Taiwanese-American actor David Wu. Special guest casts include China pop group "Shuimu Nianhua" member Luke (Lu Gengxu), Hong Kong actress Angie Chiu and so on. It received mixed reviews with critics focusing on their praise on actor Mike He and Ruby Lin.

== Plot ==
The film centres around three contemporary urban couples who are involved in what has been described as a romantic Infernal Affairs-Esquire chess game.

A pair of brother and sister - Li Zheng (played by Mike He) and Li Ying (played by Gao Fei) one happened to be a love detective and the other a love expert, when affluent businessman Xiao Feng turns up, requesting the agency test the waters with his bride-to-be, pretty psychiatrist Fei. Li Ying is immediately overwhelmed, seeing Xiao Feng as a potential catch rather than a customer.

== Cast ==
- Ruby Lin ... Fei
- Mike He ... Li Zhang
- David Wu ... Xiao Feng
- Gao Fei... Li Ying
- A Dai ... Ying Zi
- Zhang Chao ... Lu Chao
- Angie Chiu
- Wang Gang
- He Jie
- Huang Xiao Lei
- Liu Yun
- Tao Hong

== Awards and nominations ==
China Movie Channel Media Awards

- Nominated: Best Actress (Ruby Lin)
- Nominated : Best Actor (Mike He)
- Nominated : Best director (Cai Xin)
- Nominated : Best film of the year

== Featured songs ==
- Theme song "爱不能停 (Ai Buneng Ting)" by Ruby Lin and Liu Qin

== Trivia ==
- Production Studio : Beijing Golden Harvest Entertainment Co. Ltd, Star Shining TV & Art Co. Ltd
- Distributed by China Film (In China region)
- Specially Sponsor by Hyundai Car Group (Korea)

== Reception ==
- "You Deserve To Be Single feels surprisingly human for all its glossy assembly-line vacuity. The four leads all seem genuinely invested in making the film convince; Ruby Lin especially is far better than the material deserves, turning in a quiet, assured performance as Fei that's immediately winning. Even Mike He (who struggles to impress under a makeover so glossy it looks as if he's been airbrushed) still manages to internalise a weary, rueful longing that makes their banter genuinely affecting…"—twitchfilm.com
