= Mike He =

Taiwanese actor (born 1983)

- 賀軍翔
- Born: 28 December 1983 (age 42); Taipei, Taiwan
- Occupation: Actor
- Years active: 2003–present
- Children: 2

Chinese name
- Traditional Chinese: 賀軍翔
- Simplified Chinese: 贺军翔
Transcriptions
Standard Mandarin
- Hanyu Pinyin: Hè Jūnxiáng
Southern Min
- Hokkien POJ: Hō Kun-siông
- Musical career
- Also known as: Mike Ho Chun-hsiang; Xiao Mei (小美)
- Label: HIM International Music (2010–present)

Michael He (also spelled Mike Ho; Chinese: 賀軍翔; pinyin: Hè Jūnxiáng; Pe̍h-ōe-jī: Hō Kun-siông; born 28 December 1983) is a Taiwanese model and actor.

== Career ==
He gained recognition as a model under Catwalk Entertainment, known as one of the Three Musketeers of Catwalk, along with Joe Cheng and Ethan Juan. He appeared in a few music videos before acted in his first Taiwanese television series, Seventh Grade, in 2004 as one of the main characters alongside Ariel Lin. He later starred in another series with her as a lead in Love Contract.

In 2005, he starred in two TV series, Express Boy with Hsu Wei-lun, and Devil Beside You, opposite Rainie Yang and Kingone Wang. In 2006, he starred in TVBS-G's series Marry Me!.

In October 2006, he signed up for another TV series, Why Why Love, also with Rainie Yang and Kingone Wang.

He also acted in the Taiwanese TV series Bull Fighting, alongside the Taiwanese singer and S.H.E member Hebe Tien.

In 2008, He appeared in the Chinese television series Infernal Lover (无间有爱).

In 2009, He co-starred in a Taiwanese TV series Calling For Love with Charlene Choi. It was directed by Lin He Long who has already worked with He in Devil Beside You, Why Why Love and Infernal Lover.

2011 was a comeback year for He after a relatively low profile 2010. His two television series Sunny Happiness and Love Keeps Going, which co-stars Taiwanese actresses, Janine Chang and Cyndi Wang respectively, received high ratings and positive reviews.

In the same year, He also released his second book Le Retour Du Sud De La France (南法寄出) on 21 September 2011. Since its release, it has received relatively positive responses from both the media and fans. 50,000 books were sold by early October.

In 2012, He filmed two films, The Golden Couple (金童玉女) and Bad Girls (女孩坏坏). In December 2011, He also went to Shenzhen, China, to film a Mainland TV series, Refueling Mother/Happy Mother (加油妈妈/幸福妈妈). It aired every night from 14 October – 14 November 2012 and was a Hunan Satellite TV hit.

From August 2012 to January 2013, He shot Taiwanese TV series Spring Love co-starring Da Yuan, Nylon Chen, and Mai Sato. It started airing 27 January 2013 on FTV / 2 February 2013 on GTV.

== Filmography ==
=== Television series ===
Year	Original title	English title	Role	Network
2003	七年級生	Seventh Grade	Xu Liu Shan	TVBS-G
2003	求婚事務所第四單元: 畢業生	Say Yes Enterprise: The Graduate	Chen Meng Yang / Xiao Yang	TTV
2004	愛情合約	Love Contract	Liu Jian Dong (Ah Ken)	TVBS-G
2004	安室愛美惠	I Love My Wife	Dr. He, guest star on 14th episode	Azio TV
2005	惡魔在身邊	Devil Beside You	Jiang Meng (Ah Meng or Ahmon)	CTV
2005	惡男宅急電	Express Boy	Hu Tie Nan	TVBS-G
2006	我們結婚吧	Marry Me!	Bian Dang	TVBS-G
2007	換換愛	Why Why Love	Huo Da	CTS
2007	有閑倶楽部	Yukan Club	7th episode as Prince Cassar	NTV; TTV
2008	鬥牛.要不要	Bull Fighting	Shen Ruo He	TTV
2009	呼叫大明星	Calling For Love	Bo Ye	CTS
2010	無間有愛	Infernal Lover	Feng Yi	SETV
2011	幸福最晴天	Sunny happiness	Xiang Yun Jie	CTV
2011	美樂。加油	Love Keeps Going	Han Yi Lie	CTV/GTV
2012	加油媽媽	Refueling Mother	Xia Ping An	Hunan Satellite TV
2013	美人龍湯	Spring Love	Long Tian Hao (Long Tai) / Long Tian He	FTV; GTV
2014	勇敢說出我愛你	Say I Love You	Shi Pei Ran	CTV
2014	上流俗女	Go, Single Lady	Fan Jiang Yu	GTV
2017	寒武紀	Cambrian Period	Li Yongji	Youku
2018		Tree in the River	Wang Dashu	"Sohu TV”
2020	天巡者	The Devil Punisher	Zhong Kui / Zhong Zheng-nan	SETTV, Netflix
2021	赖猫的狮子倒影	The Lion's Secret	Lei Shuo	IQIYI
2024	不夠善良的我們	Imperfect Us	He Rui-zhi	GTV and Public Television Service

=== Film ===
Year	Original title	English title	Role
2009	七天愛上你	Love at Seventh Sight	Zi Qi
2010	活該你單身	You Deserve to Be Single	Li Zheng
2010	未來警察	Future X-Cops	Ma Jinxiang
2012	女孩壞壞	Bad Girls	Justin
2012	金童玉女	The Golden Couple	Spark
2018		Come On Teacher	

=== Variety show host ===
- 2003–2004: TVBS-G E-News (娛樂新聞)

=== Music video appearances ===
- Valen Hsu 許茹芸 – 雲且留住
- Angelica Lee 李心潔 – Loved Wrongly (愛錯)
- Elva Hsiao 蕭亞軒 – Love's Password
- Landy Wen 溫嵐 – Wish Me Happy Birthday (祝我生日快樂)
- Fish Leong – 梁静茹 中间 (Love Contract) 2004
- Ariel Lin – 林依晨 Lonely Northern Hemisphere (Love Contract) 2004
- Anson Hu – 胡彥斌 Waiting for you (Love Contract) 2004
- Tanya Chua – 蔡健雅 Amphibia
- Rainie Yang 楊丞琳 – Ideal Lover (理想情人) (Devil Beside You)
- Rainie Yang – Just Wanna Love You/Zhi Xiang Ai Ni (只想愛你)
- Rainie Yang – Ai Mei (曖昧) (Devil Beside You)
- Olivia Ong – Till the World Ends (海枯石爛)
- Rainie Yang – The Audience (觀眾)

== Discography ==
1.〈天使的翅膀〉In Memory of Beatrice Hsu Wei Lun (lit. Angel's Wings)

- this specially composed piece was sung by Beatrice Hsu Wei Lun's younger brother, Mike He, Ariel Lin, Joe Cheng, Cyndi Wang, etc.

2.〈發現我愛你〉呼叫大明星插曲 (lit. Realizing [that] I Love You)

- Ending Theme Song of the drama 'Calling For Love'

3.〈心中的花園〉美樂。加油插曲 (lit. A Heart's Garden)

- Ending Theme Song of the drama 'Love Keeps Going' a.k.a. 'Mei Le, Go!'

== Published works ==
- 3 June 2008 – Devil Prince Mike He : Xiao Mei's 12 Japanese Lessons
- 3 October 2008 – Devil Prince Mike He : Xiao Mei's 12 Japanese Lessons (Deluxe Edition)
- 19 September 2011 – Le Retour Du Sud De La France (Taiwan Traditional version)
- 23 December 2011 – Le Retour Du Sud De La France (Mainland Simplified version)
