= Love You (TV series) =

- Promotional poster
- Also known as: Love You While We Were Drunk
- 醉後決定愛上你
- Genre: Romance; Comedy
- Created by: SETTV
- Directed by: Ming-chang Chen
- Starring: Rainie Yang; Joseph Chang; Ann Hsu; Alien Huang; Kingone Wang; Thomas Price
- Opening theme: "不按牌理出牌" (Unplanned) by Magic Power
- Ending theme: "好的事情" (Good Things) by Yen-j
- Country of origin: Taiwan
- Original language: Mandarin; Hokkien
- No. of seasons: 1
- No. of episodes: 18 (original release); 30 (Netflix release)

Production
- Production location: Taiwan
- Running time: 90 mins (Sundays at 22:00 to 0:00)
- Production company: SETTV

Original release
- Network: TTV Main Channel
- Release: 17 April – 14 August 2011

Related
- Channel-X; Office Girls; Fated to Love You

Love You (traditional Chinese: 醉後決定愛上你; simplified Chinese: 醉后决定爱上你; pinyin: Zuì hòu jué dìng ài shàng nǐ; lit. 'love you while we were drunk') is a 2011 Taiwanese drama, starring Joseph Chang, Rainie Yang, Kingone Wang, Ann Hsu, Alien Huang, and Thomas Price. It is the second installment of the Fated to Love You trilogy. It started filming in January 2011 and wrapped on 30 April.

It was first broadcast in Taiwan on free-to-air Taiwan Television (TTV) from 17 April 2011, every Sunday at 22:00 and cable TV SET Metro from 23 April 2011, every Saturday at 21:00.

Love You was nominated for four awards at the 46th Golden Bell Awards, including Best Actor for Joseph Chang, Best Director in a Television Series for Chen Ming-chang and Best Television Series.

== Synopsis ==
Two strangers, who both proposed marriage to their respective girl/boyfriend, were rejected on the same day. They decided that the best way to deal with the rejection was to get drunk, really drunk. During the 24 hours of their crazy drunkenness, these two strangers became fast friends and married each other. When they finally sobered up, they embarked on a mission to undo every crazy thing they did while they were drunk and prayed that their girl/boyfriend wouldn't find out. However, it turns out that Jie Xiu's girlfriend, Ai Wei, doesn't want a scandal affecting her movie so she asks him to stay married to Xiao Ru for three months. Jie Xiu and Xiao Ru eventually develop feelings for each other, and Ai Wei tries to prevent their relationship from progressing. Ai Wei becomes jealous and realises how much she loves Jie Xiu, revealing the fake marriage contract to the media hoping that that will make them get back together. Soon she realises that she is too late and she cannot stop their love for each other.

Jie Xiu's mother Samantha catches trouble at a club, but they sort it out and Jie Xiu's relationship with his mother strengthens. During a celebration at the Farglory Hotel, though, Samantha ends up in the hospital after falling down the stairs. Xiao Ru's childhood friend and the franchise owner (Shuo Huai) comes back in hopes of marrying her, and in an emotional crossroads, he almost takes her back to America with him. Xiao Ru finally sorts herself out, after a long time of thinking she was "taking something that belonged to someone else". She decided that she wasn't stealing Jie Xiu from Ai Wei, and ultimately the two decide to divorce - for their fake marriage - and then marry again for real.

== Cast ==
Actor	Character	Relationships
Joseph Chang	Song Jie Xiu	Interior designer and Xiao Ru's Husband
Rainie Yang	Xiao Ru (Lulu) Lin	Headwaitress of Farglory Hotel restaurant and Yi Xiang's girlfriend/ex-girlfriend and Jie Xiu's Wife
Ann Hsu	Ai Wei (Ivy) Tang	Model/actress and Jie Xiu's girlfriend/ex-girlfriend
Alien Huang	Geng Shuo Huai	Xiao Ru's boss and childhood friend
Kingone Wang	Ren Yi Xiang	Airline pilot and Xiao Ru's boyfriend/ex-boyfriend
Thomas Price	Rickie Xiang	Actor
Chung Hsin-ling	Cai Meng Jun	Xiao Ru's colleague
Jay Di	Tony	Jie Xiu's assistant
Renzo Liu	Li Da Fu	Jie Xiu's boss
Wei-hsun Na	Dr. Qiu	Jie Xiu's marriage advisor
Charge Pu	Jack Liu	Paparazzi
Tao Chuan Zheng	Director Lu	Jie Xiu's client
Deng Jiu Yun	Peggy Kwan	Yi Xiang's new girlfriend/fiancée
Jessica Song	Kelly Shen	Jie Xiu's client and Xiao Ru's supervisor
Chi-wen Hsieh	Landlord	Xiao Ru's landlord
Lin Mei-hsiu	Asan	Xiao Ru's mother
Lo Pei-an	Long Ge	Rickie's manager
Yen Chia-le	Director Chou	Director of Avril and Rickie's film
Wang Chuan	Samantha Cai	Jie Xiu's mother
Albee Huang	Programme presenter	Entertainment Hotpot host (ep 1 and 7)

== Multimedia ==
=== Original soundtrack ===
- Opening theme: "不按牌理出牌" (Unplanned) by Magic Power
- Ending theme: "好的事情" (Good Things) by Yen-j

Album Info	Track listing
Love You Original Soundtrack (Limited Edition) 醉後決定愛上你 電視原聲帶 - with ringed notebook featuring drama quotes and photos.: Artist: Various artists; Released: 15 July 2011; Label: B'in Music; Language: Mandarin; Format: Soundtrack album; Genre: Mandopop	Track listing: 1. "不按牌理出牌" (Unplanned) by Magic Power (MP魔幻力量) – opening theme 2. "我又初戀了" (Another First Love) by Mayday also released on Born to Love; 3. "又不是這樣就不孤獨" (Not Lonely like This) by Yen-j (嚴爵); 4. "相遇不思議" (Unbelievable Meeting) – instrumental 5. "喝醉和相愛一樣危險" (Equal Danger of Drunk and Love) – instrumental 6. "這次真的玩太大了" (Played Out of Hand) – instrumental 7. "好的事情-Hao De Shi Qing" (Good Things) by Yen-j (嚴爵) – ending theme 8. "放了自己" (Let Go of Yourself) by Magic Power (MP魔幻力量); 9. "名模的祕密愛情" (Secret Love) – instrumental 10. "孤單是一個人的狂歡" (Loneliness is One's Party) – instrumental 11. "戀愛三角習題" (Love's Triangle) – instrumental 12. "我們都傻-Wo Men Dou Sha" (We're All Stupid) by Rainie Yang; 13. "婚姻是假，愛情是真" (Wedding is Fake, Love is Real) – instrumental 14. "拉斯維加斯的婚禮" (Las Vegas Wedding) – instrumental 15. "親愛陌生人" (Dear Stranger) – Della (丁噹)

=== Books ===
- Love You (Novel) (醉後決定愛上你原創小說) – ISBN 978-986-287-196-6 – released 17 June 2011

== Reception ==
Taiwan Television (TTV) Ratings
Original Broadcast Date	Episode #	Episode Name	Average	Timeslot Rank	Section Peak (every 15 mins)	Remark
17 April 2011	Cup 1	Blame it on the vodka (都是Vodka惹的禍)	2.38	1	2.90	Peak: 4.43 Overall by 1,731,000 people
24 April 2011	Cup 2	Marriage battle (悔婚大作戰)	2.62	1	2.88	
1 May 2011	Cup 3	Turtledove occupies a magpie's nest – Who's who (鳩佔鵲巢-誰是鳩、誰是鵲?)	3.10	1	3.58	Peak: 4.17
8 May 2011	Cup 4	Housewives gets going (賢內助向前衝!)	3.34	1	3.61	
15 May 2011	Cup 5	Lending happiness (幸福。出借中)	3.81	1	4.52	
22 May 2011	Cup 6	Who's the third person? (誰才是第三者?)	4.22	1	4.39	Peaked: 5.75 in the 15 to 44 age range. Overall by 2,129,000 people
29 May 2011	Cup 7	Stockholm syndrome (斯德哥爾摩症候群)	4.18	1	4.45	CTV Sunny Happiness series finale
5 June 2011	Cup 8	Secret of the button (釦子的祕密)	4.89	1	5.42	Peak:6.35 Overall by 2,286,000 people CTV Love Keeps Going premiere
12 June 2011	Cup 9	Stork's practical joke (送子鳥的惡作劇)	5.03	1	5.16	Peak:5.93 Overall by 2,320,000 people FTV Together for Love series finale
19 June 2011	Cup 10	More love more nerves 愈愛愈忐忑	4.39	1	4.59	FTV Hayate the Combat Butler premiere
26 June 2011	Cup 11	Fate it's you 緣來就是你	4.84	1	5.28	
3 July 2011	Cup 12	Old love comes trouble 舊愛來找碴	4.40	1	4.77	
10 July 2011	Cup 13	You are my courage 你是我的勇氣	4.82	1	5.76	
17 July 2011	Cup 14	Two weak halves=one strong circle 兩個脆弱的半圓=一個堅定的全圓	4.63	1		
24 July 2011	Cup 15	Dating with my ex-wife 和我的前妻談戀愛	3.99	1		
31 July 2011	Cup 16	Fortune countdown 倒數的幸福賞味	4.29	1	4.55	
7 August 2011	Cup 17	Bye, Love 與愛別離	4.54	1		
14 August 2011	CHEERS	Love you to the end 愛你到醉後	4.65	1		
Average			4.11	1	4.42	

Rival dramas on air at the same time:

- CTV Main Channel (CTV) (中視): Sunny Happiness (幸福最晴天) / Love Keeps Going (美樂。加油)
- CTS Main Channel (CTS) (華視): They Are Flying (飛行少年)
- FTV Free-to-air Channel (FTV) (民視): Together for Love (愛讓我們在一起) / Hayate the Combat Butler (旋風管家)

== Awards and nominations ==
46th Golden Bell Awards – 2011
Nomination	Category	Result
Love You	Best Television Series	Nominated
Joseph Chang	Best Actor	Nominated
Chen Ming-chang	Best Director in a Television Series	Nominated
Love You	Best Marketing Programme of the Year	Nominated
