= Gao Fei =

Chinese actress and singer

- Born: Gao Ying (高颖); Beijing, China
- Other names: 高菲
- Occupations: Actor; Singer
- Years active: 1994–present
- Children: 1

Gao Fei (Chinese: 高菲), also known as Gao Ying (高颖), is a Chinese actor and singer. She has been called a "small Carina Lau" and the "number 1 rebellious actress" by the press for her performances.

Her first leading role was in Grieved Gunfighter (1994), using Gao Ying as her screen name. She has acted in more than 20 films and over 300 television episodes. Since 2004, she has been using Gao Fei as her stage name. A a singer, her album, Extraordinary Fei, sold over 100,000 copies.

== Early life ==
Gao Fei was born and raised in Beijing, China. Her parents are professors in computer science. They initially did not approve her idea to study acting. She achieved the highest score in the entrance exam for Shanghai Theatre Academy. Her parents continued to disapprove of her decision to study acting and her mother attempted to stop having a relationship with Gao Fei. Gao wrote her mother letters and eventually, after three months, her family approved of her studies.

== Career ==
=== 1993-1995: Early career ===
While she was a student, she started acting as leading actresses in several movies including “Grieved Gunfighter” (1994), “Romantic Interlude of Red Hats” (1994), and “River of No Return” (1995). She also played in Shanghai Triad (1995) directed by Zhang Yimou.

=== 1996-2001: Television series ===
In 1996, about the same time as she graduated from Shanghai Theatre Academy, she started her acting as leading actresses in several TV series: “Shanghai Romance,” “Countryside Sister,” “Rumbling in Shanghai,” “Majestic Presence,” and “The Interests of the Family.”

=== 2002-2003: Back to films ===
In 2002, she took a break from TV series and played as leading actresses in two movies “I Am Here for You” and “Seducing Mr.”

=== 2004–2009: Back to televisions again ===
After taking a break from acting, she started using the stage name Gao Fei, and started acting as rebellious or villainous characters, earning the nickname “the number one rebellious actress.” She appeared in many TV series including “My Career as an Agent” (2004), “Evil Fire” (2005), “Marriage Code” (2006), “ Would Like to Fly” (2007), “An Epic of A Woman” (2008), and “Agent Zero: The Secret Agent” (2009).

During this period, she worked with musicians Chris Babida, Michael Lai and Pang Long, to produce her debut solo album Extraordinary Fei. The album sold over 100,000 copies. She won the Best New Talent Award at Sprite Music Awards.

=== 2010-present: Movie associate producer ===
In 2001, she wrote and worked as an associate producer and a leading actress for the movie “You Deserve to Be Single.” The movie won seven nominations including the best picture of the China Movie Channel Media Awards at the Shanghai International Film Festival in 2010.

== Filmography ==
Year	Category	Title	Director	Screen name	Role
1993	Film	Grieved Gunfigher (1994 film) 悲情枪手	Yu Benzheng	Gao Ying	Lead actress as Xiao Lan 肖岚 （女主角）
1994	Film	Romantic Interlude of Red Hats 红帽子浪漫曲	Yu Jie	Gao Ying	Xiao Lan 小兰
1995	Film	“Shanghai Triad” 摇啊摇摇到外婆桥	Zhang Yimou	Gao Ying	Little dancer 小舞女
1995	Film	“River of No Return” 大江东去	Zhuang Hongsheng	Gao Ying	Lead actress as Tian Hong 田红（女主角）
1996	TV series	“Shanghai Romance” 上海之恋	Huang Shuqin	Gao Ying	lead actress as Gu Yingying 顾盈盈（女主角）
1997	TV series	“Countryside Sister” 山妹子	Xiao Jin	Gao Ying	lead actress as countryside sister山妹子（女主角）
1998	TV series	“Rumbling in Shanghai” 闯上海	Jiang Cheng	Gao Ying	lead actress as Ah Lian 阿莲 （女主角）
2000	TV series	“Majestic Presence” 威风凛凛	Xie Mingxiao	Gao Ying	Lead actress as Hong Shaoqiu 洪少秋（女主角）
2001	TV series	“The Interests of the Family” 家族利益	Xie Mingxiao	Gao Ying	Lead actress as Shen Jiaqi 沈佳琪
2002	Film	I Am Here for You 我是你给的	Fang Qiongyi	Gao Ying	Lead actress as Liu Bingkai 刘冰楷 （女主角）
2003	Film	Seducing Mr. 引郎入室	Chen Lou	Gao Ying	Lead actress as Anna 安娜 （女主角）
2004	TV series	“My Career as an Agent” 我的特务生涯	Xie Tong	Gao Ying	Lead actress as Yu Liman于曼丽（女主角）
2005	TV series	“Evil Fire” 孽火	Hou Keming and Xie Mingxiao	Gao Fei	lead actress as Zhao Manyuan 赵曼云（反一号）
2006	TV series	“Marriage Code” 婚姻密码	Qian Xiaohong	Gao Fei	Lead actress as Fang Ling 方灵（女主角）
2007	TV series	“Would Like to Fly” 想飞	Li Guozhong	Gao Fei	Lead actress as Zhao Qian 赵倩 (反一号)
2008	TV series	“An Epic of A Woman” 一个女人的史诗	Xia Gang and Zhu Meng	Gao Fei	Lead actress Lu Lin 陆琳 (女主角)
2008	Film	“Desires of the Heart” 桃花运	Ma Liwen	Gao Fei	Guest actress Ceng Fan
2009	TV series	“Dream Come True” 梦幻天空	He Dongxing	Gao Fei	Lead actress Joyce
2009	TV series	“Agent Zero: The Secret Agent” 零号特工	Chen Jianfei	Gao Fei	Lead actress as Jian Linglin 简凌琳 （女主角）
2010	Film	You Deserve to Be Single 活该你单身	Cai Xin	Gao Fei	Lead actress as Li Ying 栗影 （女主角）
2012	Film	Flawless 天衣无缝	Li Lei	Gao Fei	Lead actress as Meng Lingling 孟玲玲 （女主角）

== Music albums ==
Year	Category	Title
2007-2008	Single (cover)	You were sentimental
2007-2008	Single	General mobilization of breakups
2007-2008	Single	Favorite of Brahms
2007-2008	Single	Why I love him
2007-2008	Single	Go far away
2007-2008	Album	General mobilization of breakups分手总动员
2007-2008	Album	Why I love him我为什么爱着他
2007-2008	Album	Happy couple幸福两口子
2008	Album	Extraordinary Fei 《菲同凡响》

== Awards and honors ==
- Elected as A member of Chinese Film Association, 2005
- China-American Cultural Awards – Charm of Characters Award (Won), 2006
- Sprite Music Awards – Best New Talent Award (Won), 2008
- Shanghai International Film Festival Best Picture Nominee, Movie “You Deserve to Be Single” as an associate producer and a leading actress, 2010

== Commercial and Humanitarian Activities ==
- Global Spokesperson, FED women’s shoes, 2002–2008
- Ambassador, China Charity Federation, Since 2006
- Ambassador, Shanghai Lao Fengxiang Jewelry, 2007–2009
- Partner, Beijing Star Shining International Film and Artists Co., Limited, Since 2007
