= Go, Single Lady =

2014 television series

- Promo poster
- Also known as: My Pig Lady
- Genre: Romance comedy
- Written by: Chen Xinyi; Li Tingyu; Shi Peiqi
- Directed by: Ke Hanchen
- Starring: Ady An; Mike He; Shin; Zhang Xianzi; Fu Xinbo
- Opening theme: Love Flavor by Shin
- Ending theme: Forever Love by Hebe Tien
- Country of origin: Taiwan
- Original language: Mandarin
- No. of episodes: 27 (ZJTV) 14 (CTV)

Production
- Executive producers: Ke Yi-qín; Chen Zhihan
- Production locations: Taiwan, Shanghai China
- Production company: Duo Man Ni Productions

Original release
- Network: ZJTV; CTV
- Release: 6 July – 15 July 2014

Go, Single Lady
- Traditional Chinese: 真愛遇到他
- Simplified Chinese: 真爱遇到他
- Literal meaning: "True Love Met Him"
Transcriptions
Standard Mandarin
- Hanyu Pinyin: Zhēn'ài yù dào tā

My Pig Lady
- Traditional Chinese: 上流俗女
- Simplified Chinese: 上流俗女
- Literal meaning: "Upper-Class Common Girl"
Transcriptions
Standard Mandarin
- Hanyu Pinyin: Shàng liú sú nǚ

Go, Single Lady (Chinese: 真愛遇到他; pinyin: Zhēn'ài yù dào tā) is a 2014 Chinese-Taiwanese co-produced television series starring Ady An and Mike He. It was first broadcast on 6 July 2014 in mainland China on ZJTV with 27 episodes. Taiwan broadcast of the series began on 23 August 2014 under the title My Pig Lady (Chinese: 上流俗女) on CTV with 24 episodes.

== Synopsis ==
Wang Man Ling (Ady An) is a crass young lady who is the daughter of a wealthy pig farmer. When a failed attempt to get her longtime boyfriend Peter to propose marriage to her at a friend's wedding reception ends with him dumping her, she makes a promise to him and all their friends that she will find a guy wealthier and more handsome than him to marry her. Her first step towards finding such a guy is to have her best friend Gao Tou Wen, who works at a matchmaking service, introduce her to guys on blind dates, but none seem to fit her requirements and each date ends with her flipping the table.

Fan Jiang Yu (Mike He) is a second generation heir who lives off of his father's wealth. He lives extravagantly and does not have a care on how he spends his money. Due to his father's death, their company stocks drops overnight leaving him almost broke.

The two meet by accident when Man Ling thinks Jiang Yu is the absolute last blind date Tou Wen will set her up on, while Jiang Yu thinks Man Ling is an artiste that he has to piss off to cut ties with his parents charity. Wanting to prove to her dad and Tou Wen that this blind date won't end with her flipping the table, she holds her temper while taking insults from Jiang Yu. Jiang Yu, seeing how he isn't getting any reactions from Man Ling, decides to flip the table and end their meeting. Mad that Jiang Yu had insulted her, Man Ling decides to stalk him outside the men's room and give him a beat down.

Once their confusion is cleared that he isn't really her blind date and she isn't the artiste mooching from his charity, the two make a deal where he will teach her how to act and dress like the rich in exchange for her paying him.

== Cast ==
=== Main ===
- Ady An as Wang Man Ling

Daughter of a wealthy pig farmer. She is crass, dresses and lives modestly.

- Mike He as Fan Jiang Yu

A second generation heir who has never really worked a day in his life. He spends carelessly and drives recklessly in his convertible around Taipei. His life is changed overnight when his father's company stocks drops and he is left broke.

- Shin as He Wei Cheng

Wang Man Ling's childhood friend and Li Ya Zi's ex-boyfriend. He is a doctor that is treating Fan Jiang Yu's father.

- Zhang Xianzi as Li Ya Zi

Fan Jiang Yu's girlfriend and He Wei Cheng's ex-girlfriend. She is a high-end women's clothing designer. She is also materialistic and stays with Jiang Yu because of his father's wealth.

- Fu Xinbo as Zhang Kai Jie

=== Supporting ===
- He Yi-hang as Wang Ji

Wang Man Ling's father and owner of a mass pig company.

- Lin Mei-hsiu as Mei Shun
- Kuo Tzu-chien as He Bo
- Ai Wei as Fan Jiang Rong
- Vicky Chen as Xu Xi Lei
- Amanda Chou as Zhou Xiao Han
- Titan Huang as Xiao Sa
- Ah Ben as Ah Bu
- Elaine Wan as Fang Fang Fang
- Chung Hsin-Ling as Gao Tou Wen
- Shone An as Feng Da Wei

=== Special appearance ===
- Ken Lin as Peter
- Apple Lin as Presenter
- Antony Kuo as Mars
- Angus Kuo as Kevin

== Soundtrack ==
Go, Single Lady - Original Television Soundtrack (真愛遇到他电视剧原声音乐大碟)
No.	Title	Music	Length
1.	"Love Flavor (愛情的滋味)"	Shin
2.	"Love Forever (愛著愛著就永遠)"	Hebe Tien
3.	"Melted (融化了)"	Popu Lady
4.	"I'm Yours (我是你的)"	Anthony Neely
5.	"Just Saying is Good Enough (說好就算了)"	Zhang Xianzi

== Broadcast ==
Channel	Country	Airing Date	Timeslot	Notes
ZJTV	China	July 6, 2014	7:30 - 10:00 p.m.	Sunday to Thursday 3 episodes
ZJTV	China	July 6, 2014	7:30 - 9:10 p.m.	Friday to Saturday 2 episodes
CTV	Taiwan	August 23, 2014	10:00 - 11:30 p.m.	Saturday
GTV	Taiwan	August 24, 2014	8:00 - 9:30 p.m.	Sunday

== Ratings ==
=== ZJTV ===
Broadcast Date	Episodes	Average Ratings	Audience share	Ranking
July 6, 2014	1-2	0.772	2.31	4
July 7, 2014	3-5	0.985	2.83	3
July 8, 2014	6-8	0.912	2.63	5
July 9, 2014	9-11	0.966	2.81	4
July 10, 2014	12-14	0.914	2.61	3
July 11, 2014	15-17	0.901	2.62	4
July 12, 2014	18-19	0.891	2.64	3
July 13, 2014	20-21	0.972	2.83	3
July 14, 2014	22-24	1.071	3.08	3
July 15, 2014	25-27	0.941	2.71	3
Average rating		0.939	---	

=== CTV ===
Broadcast Date	Episode	Average Ratings	Ranking
August 23, 2014	1	0.84	1
August 30, 2014	2	0.67	2
September 6, 2014	3	0.54	2
September 13, 2014	4	0.54	3
September 20, 2014	5	0.53	3
September 27, 2014	6	0.58	3
October 4, 2014	7	0.48	3
October 11, 2014	8	0.32	3
October 18, 2014	9	0.36	3
November 1, 2014	10	0.35	3
November 8, 2014	11		
November 15, 2014	12	0.34	1
November 22, 2014	13	0.30	1
November 29, 2014	14		
Average rating			
