= Angel Hong =

Taiwanese actress and singer

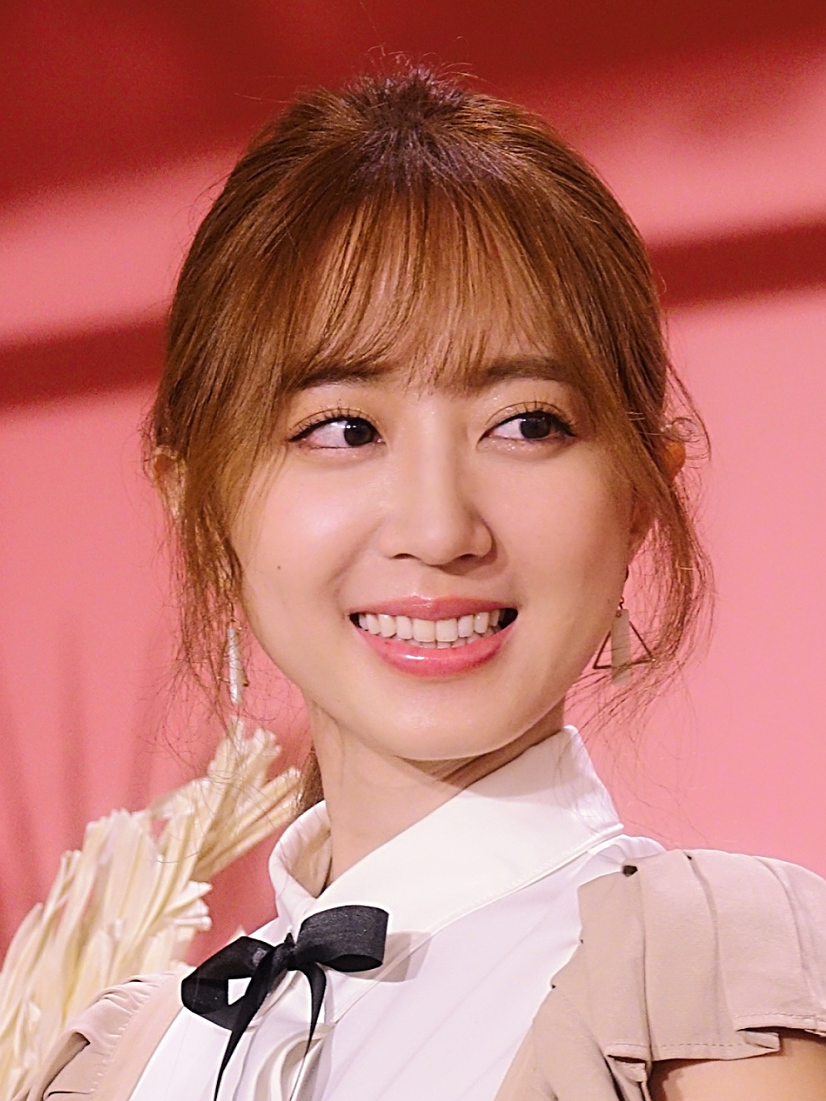
- Hong in 2019
- Born: Hóng Shīhán (洪詩涵); 7 January 1988 (age 38); Taipei, Taiwan
- Occupations: Actress; singer
- Years active: 2005–present

Chinese name
- Traditional Chinese: 洪詩
- Simplified Chinese: 洪诗
Transcriptions
Standard Mandarin
- Hanyu Pinyin: Hóngshī
- Musical career
- Label: HIM International Music

Hongshih (born as Hong Shih-han on 7 January 1988) is a Taiwanese actress and singer, and former member of girl group Popu Lady. She entered the entertainment industry in 2005 hosting music programs and being part of the audition show Blackie's Teenage Club, but wasn't chosen as a member of new girl group Hey Girl. She graduated in hotel management from Jinwen University of Science and Technology.

In 2016, she starred in TV series Behind Your Smile.

== Filmography ==
=== Television ===
Year	English title	Original title	Role	Notes
2007	I Want to Become a Hard Persimmon	我要變成硬柿子	Niu Shebing	
2014	Say I Love You	勇敢說出我愛你	Wang Xiaowei	Supporting role
2015	Love Cuisine	料理高校生	Maggie	Cameo
2016	Seventeen	弱比少男闖女校	Zhou Xiaorou	Web series
2016	Behind Your Smile	浮士德的微笑	Tang Qianni	Main role
2019	Back to Home	月村歡迎你	Zhuo Zimei	Supporting role
2023	You Are Mine	絕對佔領	Lisa	Web series

=== Film ===
Year	English title	Original title	Role	Notes
2007	I Wish	奇妙的旅程		
2007		花癡男	Xiaoshi	
2011	Boxing Dance	拳舞		
