= Alfred Cheung =

Hong Kong actor and director

Alfred Cheung (Chinese: 張堅庭) is a Hong Kong actor, director, writer and producer. Alfred's ancestral hometown is Kaiping City, Guangdong province.

== Career ==
In 1990, Alfred Cheung produced and directed a political satire movie, Her Fatal Ways.

In 2008, Cheung graduated from the EMBA of HKUST. In 2010, Cheung attended a DBA course run by Victoria University, Switzerland organized by Beijing University. Within three years, Cheung had directed two films in Mainland China: "Contract Lover" and" Love At Seventh Sight".

== Filmography ==
=== As director ===
- Monkey Business (1982)
- Let's Make Laugh (1983)
- Family Light Affair (1984)
- Let's Make Laugh II a.k.a. Goodbye Seven Day Love (1985)
- Fascinating Affairs (1985)
- The Strange Bedfellow (1986)
- To Err Is Humane (1987)
- Paper Marriage (1988)
- On the Run (1988)
- Her Fatal Ways (1990)
- Queen's Bench III (1990)
- Her Fatal Ways II (1991)
- The Banquet (1991)
- That Vital Organ (1991)
- Talk to Me, Dicky (1992)
- Her Fatal Ways III (1993)
- Her Fatal Ways IV (1994)
- Green Hat (1995)
- Bodyguards of the Last Governor (1996)
- All's Well, Ends Well 1997 (1997)
- The Group (1998)
- No Problem (1999)
- Manhattan Midnight (2001)
- Contract Lover (2007)
- Love at Seventh Sight (2009)
- My Poor Rich Father (2016)

=== As actor ===
- Ciao UFO (2019)
- 77 Heartwarmings (2019)
- Big Brother (2018)
- Z Storm (2014)
- I Love Hong Kong 2013 (2013)
- Love Is... Pyjamas (2012)
- I Love Hong Kong 2012 (2012)
