= Love at Seventh Sight =

- Film poster
- Directed by: Alfred Cheung
- Written by: Alfred Cheung; Qi Qi
- Starring: Mike He; Li Xiaolu
- Release date: 3 November 2009 (China)
- Running time: 99 minutes
- Country: China
- Language: Mandarin

Love at Seventh Sight (Chinese: 七天爱上你) is a 2009 Chinese film directed by Alfred Cheung.

== Cast ==
- Mike He as Zi Qi
- Li Xiaolu as Bai Ye
- Li Yu

== Reception ==
Reviewer Paul Fonoroff of the South China Morning Post wrote, "An inventive plot twist, pleasant scenery and attractive stars are not enough to neutralise the phoniness that wafts through this mawkish romance."
