= Her Fatal Ways =

- Theatrical poster
- Chinese: 表姐，你好嘢！
- Directed by: Alfred Cheung
- Written by: Alfred Cheung; Keith Wong
- Produced by: Chan Pooi Wa
- Starring: Carol Cheng; Alfred Cheung; Tony Leung Ka-Fai; Michael Chow
- Cinematography: William Yim
- Edited by: Kwong Chi-leung; Yu Shun
- Music by: Violet Lam
- Production companies: Bo Ho Films; Golden Harvest; Mobile Film Production; Paragon Films
- Distributed by: Golden Harvest
- Release date: 28 June 1990
- Running time: 95 minutes
- Country: Hong Kong
- Languages: Cantonese; Mandarin

Her Fatal Ways is a 1990 Hong Kong crime-comedy film. It is directed and written by Alfred Cheung Kin Ting and stars Carol "Dodo" Cheng, Tony Leung Ka-Fai, Sunny Fang Kang, Michael Chow, Sheila Chan and the Director himself. The film won the 10th Hong Kong Film Award for the Best Actress.

This film takes place in Hong Kong, where Mainland Chinese MPS officer Cheng Shih-nan (Cheng) extradites drug-dealer Wong Ti (Chow) to the Royal Hong Kong Police. Wong escapes and Cheng is forced by the State Council to stay abroad in Hong Kong and assist Chief Inspector Wu Wei-kuo (Leung) to track down Wong, as well as his boss, So Kuo Jung (Fang). The cultural differences between Hong Kong and Mainland China and her rivalry with Wu's father, a former military officer of Kuomintang, become a big headache for Cheng, a loyal member of the Chinese Communist Party.

== Plot ==
The prologue opens with MPS officer Cheng (Carol Cheng) and her nephew Hsiao-Sheng (Alfred Cheung) riding on a coach to Hong Kong. They are depicted as deep-rooted communists and uncivilised people, singing My Motherland, smoking, spitting and using verbal abuse. Simultaneously, Superintendent Cheng (Lam Chung) briefs Chief Inspector Wu (Tony Leung Ka-Fai) about a criminal case – Wong Ti, aka Niu (Michael Chow), who admits to smuggling drugs from the Golden Triangle to Hong Kong, is seeking to escape the PRC's capital punishment by helping the Royal Hong Kong Police prosecute his boss, drug dealer Su Kuo-Jung (Sunny Fang Kang). That is why Cheng is on her way escorting Wong to Hong Kong. Cheng orders Wu to receive Wong and to show Cheng around. Reluctantly, Wu handles the case, and meets Cheng at a cross-border coach station and is shocked to realize that Wong is abused by Cheng and packed in a small bag for delivery. With an oxygen mask, the police manage to save Wong from a coma.

The police detain Wong in an ad hoc command post (a local apartment) and Cheng's mission is over. Cheng visits the headquarters of the police. She fails to understand how the advanced information technology improves working efficiency, but after an experience of a lie detector malfunctioning, she claims that machines are unreliable while human resources always come first. Wu expects to accommodate Cheng in a hotel, but due to the travellers' peak season, Cheng and Sheng are unwittingly arranged to stay in a hostel at Kowloon Tong and accidentally encounter simply programmes on TV and a vibrating bed.

Back at the regional branch, Wong distracts and knocks down the guards and escapes. Cheng criticizes the so-called efficiency of the police and refuses to help retrieve Wong. However, General Secretary of the CCP Zhao Ziyang phones Cheng and threatens her that she will be exiled to the desolate Daxinganling if she fails to catch Wong (as this may mean she is not a good public servant).

Cheng then becomes active in tracing Wong and expresses her wish that the Hong Kong police will work under her command. But her proposals of arresting Su will surely be rejected by the Attorney General as they are violating human rights and are unlawful in Hong Kong. This heightens the disputes between Cheng and CIP Wu.

Dissatisfied by the Hong Kongers' hesitation, Cheng goes and confronts Su in his office alone. Su refuses to talk about Wong and expels Cheng. Having known that Cheng may bring him troubles, Su sends his henchmen to assassinate her.

Though Cheng and Hsiao-Sheng are safe, they must be moved to other places for protection. Superintendent Mok (Lam Chung) suggests letting them stay at Wu's house to protect and monitor Cheng. Mok claims that their joint-venture will bring Wu a good career perspective even after the transfer of sovereignty over Hong Kong.

Cheng's appearance leads to a micro civil war between her and Wu's pro-Kuomintang father, Colonel Wu Tien-Tsu (Lam Kau). Overnight, propaganda warfare is conducted by them singing patriotic songs through the wall in between. The next morning at breakfast, they challenge each other in forms of military uniforms and choice of left(ist) or right(ist) appendage. Soon they are temporarily mediated by Wu, who is ambidextrous (Neutral) wearing a uniform of Hong Kong Police.

Niu gets in contact with his brother and tries to escape from Hong Kong. He contacts Su for help but Su sends henchmen to kill him. Niu survives the shootout, but his brother is injured. A witness of the shootout finds a letter from his brother telling Niu that he is living at a beautiful village called Sau Mau Ping. The police thus send detectives to inquire the villagers about Niu's whereabouts. Cheng, using her interpersonal skills, socializes with the Sichuan-born villagers and gets the address of a karaoke bar where Niu frequents. At the karaoke bar, Cheng proves to be a bad singer but good at drinking. Shortly afterwards, it is confirmed that Niu regularly meets his lover, Hsuen-Pi (Sheila Chan), at the bar. The squad then spy on Hsuen-Pi.

Returning home, Cheng finds Hsiao-Sheng wearing a National Revolutionary Army uniform with Colonel Wu and his fellow veterans, intoxicated. Cheng considers this "counter-revolutionary behavior" and decides to challenge the veterans to a drinking contest; she wins, still fully conscious. Wu takes Cheng to see the night view of Hong Kong and as they return home on the elevator, Cheng sees the "dark side" of Hong Kong as a power outage occurs. When the lights are on again, they find themselves holding each other's hands. Cheng gets his first taste of love.

In embarrassment, they go on working. This time, Cheng and Hsiao-Sheng decide to pretend to be Niu's lawful wife and get Niu's contact from Hsuen-Pi. But Niu is actually hiding in Hsuen-Pi's house and after a fight with Cheng, he successfully escapes again.

Later, Wu receives information that Niu will rob a jewellery shop. Detectives are scattered around the shop to spot Niu but their cover is later revealed as Chan drops his revolver when he tries to save a girl in the middle of the road. The police and Niu's duet exchange fire in the crowded street and after a long chase they meet each other at a narrow corridor inside a building. Cheng, shoots Niu's partner down with excellent marksmanship but Niu gets away for the third time.

Frustrated by the situation, Mok offers a three-day limit for Wu and Cheng to arrest Niu. Failure to do so will post Wu to Tai A Chau Detention Centre and send Cheng back to China.

New information shows that Su is meeting some potential drug dealers in nightclubs and the police need female undercovers to listen in on their conversations. Cheng voluntarily becomes the undercover and as Su brings her home, he meets Niu. Niu requests three million dollars from Su to flee and claims that the drug stocks stored at San Yik Godown is worth 20 million dollars. As Su finally kills Niu after a long bargain, Cheng escapes Su and goes to the wrong San Yik Godown. Cheng interrogates the keepers of the wrong godown with torture, and gets arrested. She is imprisoned and ready to be sent back to China.

Wu reads through receipts of the godowns and finds out the correct Sun Yik Godown for it has stored many seeds of cannabis sativa for producing marijuana. The squad breaks into the godown and finds actual cannabis. However, Hsiao-Sheng is caught by the godown workers and their plan is destroyed by Su, who is armed. Su and his workers ties up the squad and is about to burn them with petroleum. Suddenly, the light goes out and the Nationalist veterans appear to save the squad. Wu runs forward and fights with Su. Finally, the situation is under control. While Superintendent Mok arrives and daydreams about his promotion to Commissioner of Police, Cheng and Colonel Wu finally become friends and achieve a collaboration between the Communists and the Nationalists.

At the border, Cheng gives Wu a letter, expressing her apologies for her bad temper and thankfulness during this working tour in Hong Kong. She admits that it is the first time she held a man's hand and that this memory is precious. Finally, she looks forward to opportunities for cooperation after 1997.

== Casting ==
- Carol "Dodo" Cheng as Cheng Shih-nan (鄭碩男), aka Sister Cheng (鄭大姐), an MPS officer from Sichuan, born of a Cantonese mother and formerly multilingual. Her name literally means "bulky man".
- Tony Leung Ka-Fai as Chief Inspector Wu Wai-kwok (伍衛國), a chief of a Hong Kong Police CID squad.
- Alfred Cheung Kin-Ting as Hsiao-Sheng (小勝), nephew and assistant of Cheng, with unstable extra-sensory perception recognised by the State Council.
- Lam Kau as Colonel Wu Tien-tzu (伍天賜), CIP Wu's father, retired commander of 391st Brigade, 131st Division of the National Revolutionary Army.
- Sunny Fang Kang as Su Kuo-Jung (蘇國榮), a Hong Kong-based Chinese herbal medicine importer, localised product merchant and leader of Kaifong association, accused of participating in the illegal drug trade, as well as prostitution, operating illegal casinos and smuggling.
- Michael Chow as Wong Ti (王弟), aka Niu (阿牛), So's agent in Yunnan.
- Lam Chung as Superintendent Mok (莫警司), CIP Wu's superior
- Pal Sinn Lap-Man as Chan Fuk-sang (陳復生), member of CIP Wu's squad
- Emotion Cheung as "Chairman Mao" (「巫主席」), member of CIP Wu's squad
- Sheila Chan as Suet-pik (雪碧), a nightclub singer and lover of Wong
- Sunny Chan as Witness, who witnesses and reports the shootout between Wong and So's henchmen.
- Cho Tat-wah as a Kuomintang commander

== Awards and nominations ==
The film received 10th Hong Kong Film Award for the Best Actress Carol Cheng in 1990.

== Sequels ==
The film later got three sequels, Her Fatal Ways II in 1991, Her Fatal Ways III in 1993, and Her Fatal Ways IV in 1994.
