= Eugenie Liu =

Taiwanese actress (born 1990)

- 劉奕兒
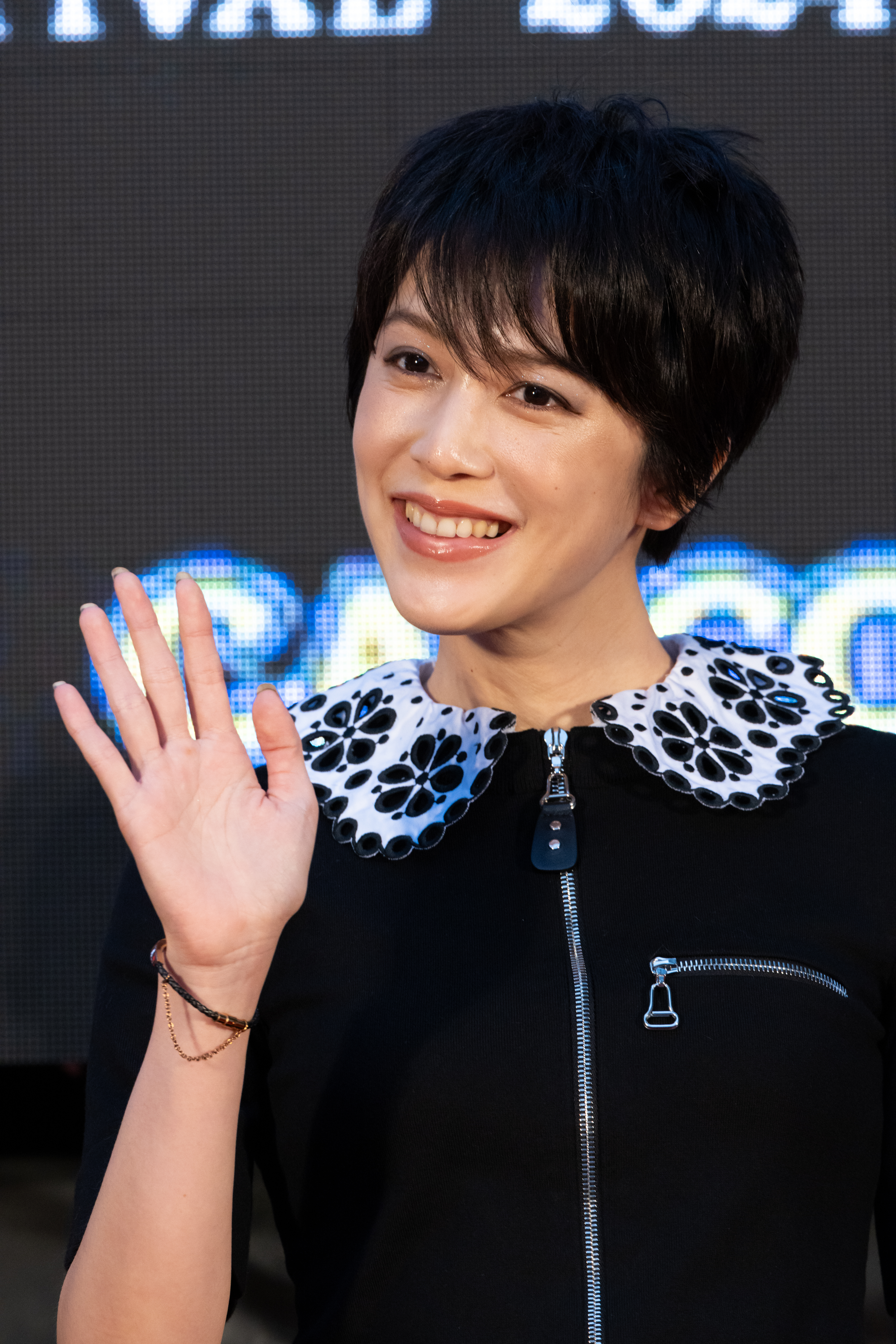
- Liu at the 2024 TIFF
- Born: Liu Si-ting; 12 November 1990 (age 35); Taiwan
- Education: Chinese Culture University (BJ)
- Occupation: Actress
- Years active: 2015–present
- Relatives: Kao Ming (grandfather); Liu Lin (great uncle)

Eugenie Liu Yi-er (Chinese: 劉奕兒; born Liu Si-ting; 12 November 1990) is a Taiwanese actress. Liu took on lead roles in the television series Behind Your Smile (2016), as well as Netflix series Triad Princess (2019) and Futmalls (2020). She made her feature film debut as Older Monster in the horror comedy film Mon Mon Mon Monsters (2017), and starred as Lin Chen-chen in the drama film Old Fox (2023), for which she earned a nomination for Best Supporting Actress in the 60th Golden Horse Awards. In 2024, she starred as Fan Zuer in the drama film Daughter's Daughter and received another nomination for Best Supporting Actress in the 61st Golden Horse Awards.

== Early life and education ==
Eugenie Liu was born Liu Si-ting on 12 November 1990. Her grandfather Kao Ming and her great-uncle Liu Lin are both actors, although Liu did not disclose her relationship with Kao Ming until his death in 2017. Her father is a Taekwondo coach, who sparked her interest in sports from a young age. Liu attended a unisex school starting in junior high, and was part of the athletics team in primary school, as well as the basketball and volleyball teams in high school. Aspiring to become a sports journalist since sixth grade, she enrolled at Chinese Culture University to major in journalism and spent all her remaining credits on sports science. Upon graduating with a Bachelor of Journalism in 2013, she initially secured a job at Videoland Sports Channel. However, when her father went bankrupt and her mother was diagnosed with breast cancer in her final year, leaving the family with $7 million in debt, Liu was compelled to enter the entertainment industry, a decision she described as a means to "spare more time to take care of her mother" and "alleviate his father's financial burden". She signed with Star Ritz International Entertainment and debuted as a model shortly after graduation. In 2014, she was cast in a leading role in the sports film Volleyball Sweetheart, for which she underwent several months of volleyball training, but the film was ultimately scrapped that same year.

== Career ==
In 2015, Liu made her acting debut as Lin Yu-chiao in the Line TV series Happy Together, starring alongside Bruce Hung. The following year, she played Wen Hsiao-kuang in A Good Day and Lei Xinyu in Behind Your Smile, opposite Marcus Chang. In 2017, she made her feature film debut in Giddens Ko's horror comedy Mon Mon Mon Monsters as the Older Monster, with Ko writing the screenplay specifically for her and Liu agreed to the role after reading the script. She then starred as one of the five leading actresses in the 2018 romantic comedy film How to Train Our Dragon and portrayed police detective Chang Ju-hsin in the 2019 crime film The 9th Precinct.

Liu landed a main role as Angie Ni, the daughter of a gang boss, in the 2019 Netflix romance comedy series Triad Princess alongside Jasper Liu. Stephen McCarty of South China Morning Post called Liu's performance in Triad Princess "stealing the show", while John Serba of Decider praised her flexibility to be "funny and badass at the same time". She appeared as Yang Nian-jun in another Netflix series Futmalls in the following year. In 2021, she made a cameo in Giddens Ko's Till We Meet Again and had a leading role in the Hong Kong supernatural comedy series Sometimes When We Touch. She also released her first solo single "Oblivion" in the same year, which she composed during the COVID-19 pandemic after filming Sometimes When We Touch, crediting it as a song to "farewell her deceased family members".

In 2023, Liu portrayed Liu Chen-chen, the secretary of Akio Chen's character, in the crime film Old Fox, earning nominations for Best Supporting Actress in the 60th Golden Horse Awards and Best Supporting Actress in the 26th Taipei Film Awards. Andrew Tomoe, writing for The News Lens, described Liu's performance in Old Fox as the "biggest surprise of the film", applauding her "charming" side character arc in which she secretly loves Liu Kuan-ting's character; while in Alex Chung's review for HK01, he particularly complimented Liu's performance, noting that although the character is "relatively complex", she portrayed it "fittingly" with a "good grasp". She also starred as Liang Jing-tsen in the SET-CTS television series Trick or Love that same year. In 2024, Liu took on a lead role as Fan Zuer alongside Sylvia Chang and Karena Lam in the drama film Daughter's Daughter, for which she received another nomination for Best Supporting Actress in the 61st Golden Horse Awards. Josh Slater-Williams of IndieWire described Liu's performance as "magnetic", contributing to the delivery of the character and her complicated relationships, making them "incredibly compelling".

== Personal life ==
As of December 2017, Liu resided in Neihu District, Taipei, Taiwan. As of 2024, she has been in a relationship with Hong Kong actor and action choreographer Jimmy Hung for seven years.

== Filmography ==
=== Film ===
Year	Title	Role	Notes/Ref.
2017	Mon Mon Mon Monsters	Older Monster	
2018	How to Train Our Dragon	Li Ya-ling (李亞玲)	
2019	The 9th Precinct	Chang Ju-hsin (張如心)	
2021	Till We Meet Again	Little horse thief	Cameo
2023	Love Fool	Bei Bei (貝貝)	
2023	Old Fox	Lin Chen-chen (林珍珍)	
2024	Daughter's Daughter	Fan Zuer (范祖兒)	

=== Television ===
Year	Title	Role	Notes/Ref.
2015	Happy Together	Lin Yu-ciao (林雨喬)	Main role
2016	A Good Day	Wen Hsiao-kuang (溫小光)	Main role
2016	Behind Your Smile	Lei Xinyu (雷芯語)	Main role
2017	Home Sweet Home	Flight attendant	Cameo
2019	Triad Princess	Angie Ni (倪安琪)	Main role
2020	Futmalls	Yang Nian-jun (楊念君)	Main role
2021	Sometimes When We Touch	Fang Hsiao-lu (方小路)	Main role
2023	Trick or Love	Liang Jing-tsen (梁靜岑)	Main role

== Awards and nominations ==
Year	Award	Category	Work	Result	Ref.
2023	60th Golden Horse Awards	Best Supporting Actress	Old Fox	Nominated	
2024	5th Taiwan Film Critics Society Awards	Best Actress	Old Fox	Nominated	
2024	26th Taipei Film Awards	Best Supporting Actress	Old Fox	Nominated	
2024	61st Golden Horse Awards	Best Supporting Actress	Daughter's Daughter	Pending	
