= Be with You (TV series) =

- Promo poster
- Also known as: Want to Love
- 好想談戀愛
- Genre: Romance, Family
- Created by: Sanlih E-Television
- Written by: Shao Hui Ting 邵慧婷 (Screenwriter coordinator); Zheng Ying Min 鄭英敏; Zheng Han Wen 鄭涵文; Wu Xiang Ying 吳香穎; Chen Kai Zhu 陳凱筑
- Directed by: Ke Zheng Ming 柯政銘
- Starring: Bobby Dou 竇智孔; Huang Pei Jia 黃姵嘉; Nylon Chen 陳乃榮; Vivi Lee 李維維
- Opening theme: Finding You Is My Biggest Accomplishment 找到你是我最偉大的成功 by Leo Ku 古巨基
- Ending theme: Take Care of Her For Me 替我照顧她 by Hu Xia 胡夏
- Country of origin: Republic of China (Taiwan)
- Original language: Mandarin
- No. of seasons: 1
- No. of episodes: 72

Production
- Executive producer: Liu Qiu Ping 劉秋平
- Producers: Fang Xiao Ren 方孝仁; Xie Yi Sheng 謝益勝
- Production location: Taiwan
- Camera setup: Multi camera
- Running time: 60 minutes
- Production companies: Golden Bloom Production Co., Ltd. 金牌風華影像製作公司; XieLi Video Production Co., Ltd. 協利影像製作股份有限公司; We Image Production Co. Ltd 舞韾堂有限公司

Original release
- Network: SETTV
- Release: 14 April – 22 July 2015

Related
- Dear Mom 我的寶貝四千金; Bitter Sweet 軍官·情人

Be With You (Chinese: 好想談戀愛; pinyin: hǎo xiǎng tán liàn'ài ) is a 2015 Taiwanese romance, family drama television series produced by Sanlih E-Television, starring Bobby Dou, Huang Pei Jia, Nylon Chen, and Vivi Lee as the main cast. The Chinese title literally translates to "Want To Love". Filming began on March 18, 2015 and the series was aired while filming continued. First original broadcast began April 14, 2015 on SETTV channel, airing weekly from Monday till Friday at 8:00-9:00 pm.

== Synopsis ==
Can a young woman gather the courage she needs to approach a high school crush? Xia Man Li (Vivi Lee) was always popular in school and was the prettiest girl of her high school, but she has always been unlucky in love. When she attends a high school reunion, she meets up again with Zhao Li Qi (Nylon Chen), a sweet guy that she used to have a crush on. Man Li’s younger sister, Xia Man An (Huang Pei Jia) also has fostered a childhood crush on Zhen Ying Jie (Bobby Dou), but despite all her efforts to get close to him, he always seems to have someone else by his side. A decade later, can the sisters gather the courage to follow their hearts?

== Cast ==
=== Main cast ===
- Bobby Dou 竇智孔 as Zheng Ying Jie 鄭英杰
- Huang Pei-chia 黃姵嘉 as Xia Man An 夏曼安
- Nylon Chen 陳乃榮 as Zhao Li Qi 趙立奇
- Vivi Lee 李維維 as Xia Man Li 夏曼儷
- Edison Wang 王家梁 as Xia Man Wu 夏曼武
- Serena Fang 房思瑜 as Yang Xin Ru 楊心如

=== Supporting cast ===
- Lee Chung-lin 李宗霖 as Zheng Ying Qian 鄭英謙
- Huang Wei-ting 黃薇渟 as Sun Yu Qing 孫妤晴
- Jeanine Yang 楊 晴 as Bai Xuan Xuan 白萱萱
- Adrian Tan 陳凱旋 as He Shang De 何尚德
- Chien Chang 檢 場 as Xia Rong Fa 夏榮發
- Pan Li-li 潘麗麗 as Zhuang Cui Ping 莊翠萍
- Don Wong 王 道 as Zheng Yong Da 鄭永達
- Yang Chieh-mei 楊潔玫 as Liang Qing Zhen 梁琴甄
- Wang Yi-lu 王以路 as Lin Yue Er 林樂兒
- Chiang Meng-ling 蔣孟玲 as Fang Hui Shan 方惠姍
- Wang Man-chiao 王滿嬌 as Xia Grandma 夏阿嬤
- Angel Ho 何以奇 as Li Xiang Ning 李湘凝
- David Chiu 邱昊奇 as Xiao Bin 蕭 斌

=== Cameo ===
- Joanne Tseng 曾之喬 as Li Yi Wan 黎一彎
- Melvin Sia 謝佳見 as Du Xiao Fei 杜曉飛
- Tracy Deng 鄧筠庭 as Child Man An
- Chen Ding-chung 陳鼎中 as Child Ying Jie
- Chan Kai-yu 詹鎧聿 as Child Ying Qian
- Huang Jian Hao 黃建豪 as Lu Ke 路克
- Xiao Zhi Wei 蕭志偉 as Lu Ren Jia 路人甲
- Jackson Lou 樓學賢 as Professor Chen
- Katie Chen 陳語安 as Ms. Chen (Professor Chen's daughter)
- Lin Chun-yung 林埈永 as thief
- Shao Yu-chieh 邵郁傑 as store manager
- Chou Ming-tseng 周明增 as Taoist priest
- Shen Meng-sheng 沈孟生 as Tsai Liang Ming 蔡亮銘
- Lin Chia-wei 林家磑 as Secretary Liu

== Soundtrack ==
- Finding You Is My Greatest Accomplishment 找到你是我最偉大的成功 by Leo Ku 古巨基
- Take Care of Her For Me 替我照顧她 by Hu Xia 胡夏
- Happiness is Here 幸福在這裡 by Hu Xia 胡夏
- Undertake 承擔 by Leo Ku 古巨基
- Why Bother? 何必打擾 by Leo Ku 古巨基
- Fearless 無畏 by Leo Ku 古巨基
- Monster 怪物 by Leo Ku 古巨基
- Music Shutter 音樂快門 by Eric Chou 周興哲
- Oh! Love OH!愛 by Nylon Chen 陳乃榮
- Fearlessly 一無所懼 by Ailing Tai 戴愛玲
- You are Not Mine 你不是我 by Ailing Tai 戴愛玲
- The Most Precious Moment 最幸福的時間 by Victor Wong 品冠

== Broadcast ==
Network	Country	Airing Date	Timeslot
SETTV	Taiwan	April 14, 2015	Monday to Friday 8:00-9:00 pm
ETTV	Taiwan	April 14, 2015	Monday to Friday 9:00-10:00 pm
Astro Shuang Xing	Malaysia	April 28, 2015	Sunday to Thursday 6:00-7:00 pm
VV Drama	Singapore	May 15, 2015	Monday to Friday 7:00-8:00 pm
Amarin TV	Thailand	February 9, 2016	Monday to Friday 2:00-3:30 pm

== Episode ratings ==
Competing dramas on rival channels airing at the same time slot were:
- SET Taiwan - Ordinary Love
- FTV - Dowry
- TTV - Our Mother, HARU, If God Loves
- CTV - The Empress of China
- CTS - RPOGE, Lady & Liar

Air Date	Episodes	Weekly Average Ratings	Rank
April 14–19, 2015	1-4	1.31	5
April 20–24, 2015	5-9	1.48	4
April 27-May 1, 2015	10-14	1.56	4
May 4–8, 2015	15-19	1.52	4
May 11–15, 2015	20-24	1.51	4
May 18–22, 2015	25-29	1.66	4
May 25–29, 2015	30-34	1.58	4
June 1–5, 2015	35-39	1.44	5
June 8–12, 2015	40-44	1.51	4
June 15–19, 2015	45-49	1.30	5
June 22–26, 2015	50-54	1.55	5
June 29–July 3, 2015	55-59	1.55	5
July 6–10, 2015	60-64	1.68	5
July 13–17, 2015	65-69	1.65	5
July 20–22, 2015	70-72	1.94	5
Average ratings		1.56	

== Awards and nominations ==
Ceremony	Category	Nominee	Result
2015 Sanlih Drama Awards	Best Actor Award	Bobby Dou	Nominated
2015 Sanlih Drama Awards	Best Actor Award	Nylon Chen	Nominated
2015 Sanlih Drama Awards	Best Actress Award	Huang Pei Jia	Nominated
2015 Sanlih Drama Awards	Best Actress Award	Vivi Lee	Nominated
2015 Sanlih Drama Awards	Best Cry Award	Bobby Dou & Don Wong	Nominated
2015 Sanlih Drama Awards	Best Potential Award	Adrian Chen	Nominated
2015 Sanlih Drama Awards	Best Potential Award	Li Chung Lin	Nominated
2015 Sanlih Drama Awards	Viewers Choice Drama Award	Be With You	Nominated
