= Beatrice Hsu =

Taiwan actress (1978–2007)

- Born: 13 November 1978; Taipei, Taiwan
- Died: 28 January 2007 (aged 28); Taichung, Taiwan
- Occupations: Actress, singer
- Years active: 2001–2007

Chinese name
- Traditional Chinese: 許瑋倫
- Simplified Chinese: 许玮伦
Transcriptions
Standard Mandarin
- Hanyu Pinyin: Xǔ Wěilún
- Musical career
- Also known as: Xu Weilun
- Instruments: Piano, Harp, Drums, Guitar, Erhu, Konghou
- Website: www.weilun.idv.tw

Beatrice Hsu Wei-lun traditional Chinese: 許瑋倫; simplified Chinese: 许玮伦; pinyin: Xǔ Wěilún; Wade–Giles: Hsü Wei-lun; (13 November 1978 – 28 January 2007) was a Taiwanese actress.

== Career ==
Hsu was a well-known actress from Taiwan and had been acting for about 5 years. She started her career as a model, and was a trained musician from a young age as she could play the piano and but her charm and beauty were quickly noticed by television producers. She started acting while in university, and gradually gaining her fame and popularity. She was not only known for her looks, but her lovable performances in acting as well. She also co-starred in a few super hit MVs and was a very popular figure in television commercials in Taiwan.

She was first noticed by the press for her role in a television commercial for the convenience store chain 7-Eleven, and later for her role in the GTV drama True Love 18 (十八歲的約定) for which she was nominated "Best Supporting Actress" at the Golden Bell Awards in 2002. From there, she went on to take on leading roles in various television dramas and movies.

She was first noticed by audience for her brief appearance in the popular TV drama "Meteor Garden". Her first popular leading role was the Taiwan TV drama "Love Storm" where she starred with her ex-boyfriend Vic Chou, one of the members of F4.

She was the girlfriend of actor-singer Lee Wei before being linked with Vic Chou in 2004. Her relationship with Zhou did not last and ended in 2005 due to his talent company's "no-relationship clause". She starred in 2005 Taiwan hit TV drama "Express Boy" (惡男宅急電) with Mike He and became a popular television star.

Hsu was also a talented musician, capable of playing piano, harp, konghou (Chinese harp), guitar, drums, and erhu. She had a duet with Gary Cao in the song Freedom for the Nine-Ball TV drama OST in 2004. She is also fluent in Mandarin, Taiwanese Hokkien, English and French (she majored in French at university).

== Death and memorial ==
Hsu was involved in a fatal accident on the Taichung stretch of Taiwan's National Highway No. 1 at 23:15 on 26 January 2007, while travelling with her assistant to Nantou for the filming of Daughter of the Sun (Traditional Chinese: 太陽的女兒). Her Mini Cooper driven by her assistant collided with the barrier/guardrail on the highway and spun out to the other side (slow lane) of the highway and came to a halt. According to passers-by, the Mini Cooper was travelling at around 120–130 km/h.

Having come to a halt, and thinking that it was safe, Hsu unbuckled her seat belt before the Mini Cooper's rear-end was hit by a truck. When the collision occurred, only the passenger side's airbag was deployed. The front airbag failed to deploy (airbags are not designed to deploy in rear impact collision). Contrary to witness' testimony, her assistant denied being the driver at the time of the accident. She developed post-traumatic hydrocephalus in which the increased pressure crushed the brainstem.

Despite 43 hours of emergency treatment, her heartbeat stopped at 17:09 and she died on 28 January 2007, at 19:37 local time, leaving behind her father, mother and a younger brother.

A posthumous memorial concert was held in her memory on 9 February 2007, fulfilling Hsu's dream of holding her own concert, a day after her body was cremated.

Despite her death, Lee Wei, Cyndi Wang and Rainie Yang continues to send birthday messages on social media on her birthday every year.

== Filmography ==
=== Television series ===
- (2007, CTS) Daughter of the Sun 太陽的女兒
- (2007, CTS) Fly with Me 想飛
- (2005, CTV) Double Jade Legend 雙璧傳說
- (2005, TVBS-G) Express Boy 惡男宅急電
- (2004, GTV) Nine-Bal 撞球小子
- (2004, TTV) Scent of Love 戀香 cameo
- (2003, CTV) The Only in the World 天下無雙
- (2003, CTS) Love Storm 狂愛龍捲風 cameo
- (2002, CTS) Secretly Loving You 偷偷愛上你
- (2002, GTV) True Love 18 十八歲的約定
- (2001, CTS) Meteor Garden I 流星花園 cameo

=== Film ===
- (2002) Victor U-Turn 180 degrees
- (2003) Turn Left, Turn Right 向左走·向右走 cameo
- (2005) Slap the Monkey 二千三百萬種死法

=== Music video ===
- (2002) Sammi Cheng, Willing 〈捨得〉
- (2001) Victor Huang 品冠, Responsibility of Being Fond Of You 〈疼你的責任〉
- (2001) Leehom Wang, Sense Of Safe 〈安全感〉
- (2001) Nicholas Tse 〈慌〉, Fluster
- (2001) Eason Chan, King of Karaoke Songs 〈K歌之王〉
- (2001) Jacky Wu, 吳宗憲, Strangers, Who Love Me? 〈陌生人、誰愛我〉
- (2001) MAYDAY, Will You? 〈好不好〉
- (2000) Maggie Chiang, Lonely Flight〈寂寞飛行〉

== Music ==
- (2004) Freedom – Nine-Ball OST duet

== Books ==
- 許瑋倫蛋蛋日記 2004/7/7 ISBN 957-29637-1-6
- 許瑋倫的美麗7堂課 2006/2/27 ISBN 986-133-136-0
