= Love Keeps Going =

- Promotional poster
- Also known as: 美樂。加油
- Genre: Romance, Comedy
- Directed by: Ke Hanchen
- Starring: Mike He; Cyndi Wang; Eli Shih
- Opening theme: "不哭" (Don't Cry) by Cyndi Wang
- Ending theme: "黏黏黏黏" (Stick to You) by Cyndi Wang
- Country of origin: Republic of China (Taiwan)
- Original language: Mandarin
- No. of episodes: 13

Production
- Production location: Taiwan
- Running time: 90 mins (Sundays at 22:00 to 23:30)

Original release
- Network: CTV Main Channel
- Release: 5 June – 28 August 2011

Related
- Sunny Happiness (幸福最晴天); Love Recipe (料理情人夢)

Love Keeps Going (Chinese: 美樂。加油; pinyin: Měilè. Jiāyóu) is a 2011 Taiwanese drama starring Cyndi Wang, Mike He and Eli Shih. It is based on Taiwanese novel, Wang's Love Song (Chinese: 王的戀歌; pinyin: Wáng de liàngē).

It was first broadcast in Taiwan on free-to-air China Television (CTV) from 5 June 2011, every Sunday at 22:00 to 23:30 and on cable TV Gala Television (GTV) Variety Show/CH 28 on 11 June 2011, every Sunday at 21:00 to 22:30. The premiere episode on CTV achieved an average rating of 1.84.

== Synopsis ==
Zha Mei Le (Cyndi Wang) is illustrious, humble and hardworking. She is also well-behaved, obedient, caring and kind. Her vast collection of certificates (including IT expertise to a baking license) is a testament to her enthusiasm. Despite her faultless exterior, she hides a bittersweet past. An accidental incident of eavesdropping led her to discover that neither of her parents, while going through their divorce, wanted custody of her, purely due to her being stupid. As a result, she has since worked hard to develop skills, gaining love and approval in the process.

Her boyfriend, Han Yi Feng (Eli Shih) still falls in love with her, as a result of her mass abilities and generous nature. His mother and sister both are impressed by and greatly admire her from the start of their relationship. Mei Le even helps achieve what she thinks is Yi Feng's dream of opening and running a bakery. There is a slight marring of this idyllic plot, with the introduction of Yi Feng's brother, the spoilt, rich and famous Han Yi Lie (Mike He). Mei Le makes a terrible first impression on him but she is determined to change that.

All seems well with the couple engaged to be married. However, in a cruel twist of fate, Yi Feng shows his true character and is not at all what Mei Le thought him to be. When she finds out that their relationship is not as pure as she thought it was, she is set with the difficult task of rediscovering herself, along with help, and in the process, learns to trust and fall in love again.

== Cast ==
Actor	Character	Relationships
Cyndi Wang	Zha Mei Le (查美樂)/He Yan Qin 何言沁	Main character/younger sister of He Yan Shao (何言劭)
Mike He	Han Yi Lie (韓以烈)	Zha Mei Le (查美樂)'s later boyfriend, younger brother of Han Yi Feng (韓以風)
Eli Shih	Han Yi Feng (韓以風)	Zha Mei Le (查美樂)'s original boyfriend, older brother of Han Yi Lie (韓以烈) and Han Yi Fei (韓以霏)
Zhang Shan Wei	Zha Yu Cheng (查宇誠)	Older brother of Zha Mei Le (查美樂)
Albee Huang	Han Yi Fei (韓以霏)	Younger sister of Han Yi Feng (韓以風) and Han Yi Lie (韓以烈)
Michelle Zhang	Guo Xuan Xuan (郭瑄瑄)	Bread shop assistant. Han Yi Feng's later girlfriend.
Liu Yan	Chu Yin (楚茵)	Han Yi Lie (韓以烈)'s assistant
Yu Hao Cheng	Xiao Jie (小傑)	
Lene Lai	Xiao Jun (小君)	Han Yi Lie (韓以烈)'s ex-girlfriend
Xiao Xiao Bin	Xiao Zhi (小志)	Younger brother of Guo Xuan Xuan (郭瑄瑄)
Yi Zheng	Mr. Han	Mr. Han father of Han Yi Lie, Han Yi Feng and Han Yi Fei
Linda Liu	Mrs Zha (查妈)	Zha Mei Le and Zha Yu Cheng's mother
Wang Yue	Mrs. Han (韓妈)	Mother of Han Yi Lie (韓以烈), Han Yi Feng (韓以風) and Han Yi Fei (韓以霏)
Zhang Lunshuo (張倫碩)	He Yan Shao (何言劭)	Older brother of He Yan Qin 何言沁

== Music ==
- Opening theme song: "不哭" (Don't Cry) by Cyndi Wang
- Ending theme song: "黏黏黏黏" (Stick to You) by Cyndi Wang

Insert song

- "下一頁的我" (The Next Page of Me) by Cyndi Wang
- "心中的花園" (Hearts Garden) by Mike He
- "寂寞暴風雨" (Lonely Storm) by Blue Bird Flying Fish (青鳥飛魚)
- "情人結" (To Love) by Jing Chang
- "起来" (Up) by Daniel Chan ([陳曉東)

== Reception ==
China Television (CTV) (中視) Ratings
Episode	Original Broadcast Date	Average	Rank	Peak sub-rating	Remarks
1	5 June 2011	1.84	2	2.91	
2	12 June 2011	1.38	2	1.52	FTV Together for Love series finale
3	19 June 2011	1.56	2	1.64	FTV Hayate the Combat Butler premiere
4	26 June 2011	1.40	2	1.66	
5	3 July 2011	1.92	2	2.09	
6	10 July 2011	1.97	2	2.47	
7	17 July 2011	2.23	2	2.31	
8	24 July 2011	2.06	2	2.34	
9	31 July 2011	2.11	2	2.33	
10	7 August 2011	2.07	2	2.28	
11	14 August 2011	1.55	2	1.71	TTV Love You series finale
12	21 August 2011	2.39	2	2.67	TTV Office Girls premiere
13	28 August 2011	2.93	2	3.37	
Average					

Source: China Times

Rival dramas on air at the same time:

- Taiwan Television (TTV) (台視): Love You (醉後決定愛上你) / Office Girls (小資女孩向前衝)
- Chinese Television System (CTS) (華視): They Are Flying (飛行少年)
- Formosa Television (FTV) (民視): Together for Love (愛讓我們在一起) / Hayate the Combat Butler (旋風管家)

== International broadcast ==
- Singapore – Channel U on 11 June 2011 from 21:30 to 23:00.
- Thailand – Channel 7 on 13 January 2014 from 02:00 to 03:00
