= Popu Lady =

Taiwanese girl group

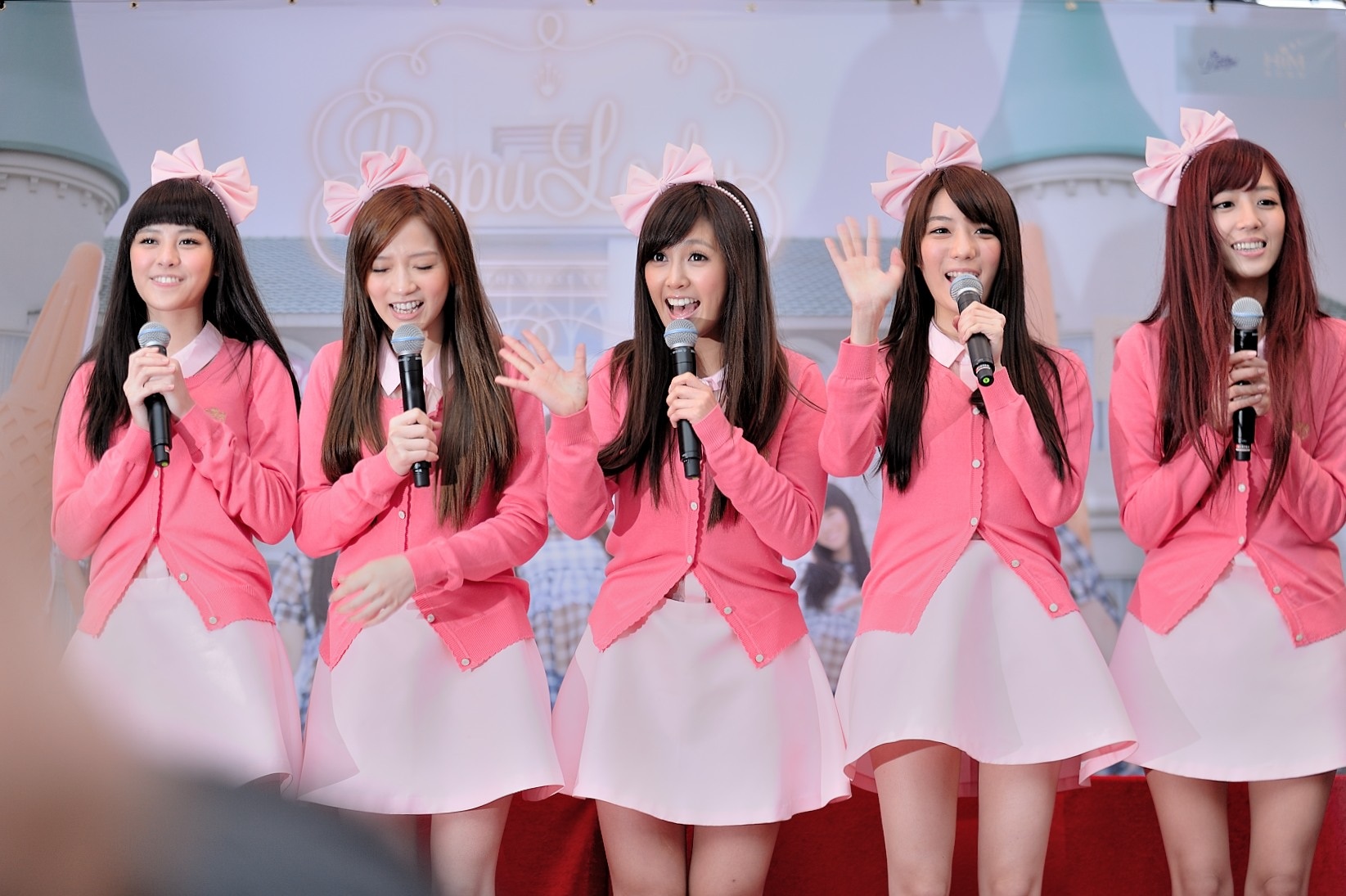
- Popu Lady on 3 January 2013; From left to right: Yushan, Bao'er, Dayuan, Tingxuan, and Hongshi

Background information
- Origin: Taiwan
- Genres: Mandopop
- Years active: 2012–2019
- Labels: HIM International Music; B'in Music; Warner Music
- Members: Hongshi; Dayuan; Bao'er; Tingxuan; Yushan
- Website: him.com.tw

Popu Lady was a five-member Taiwanese girl group based in Taiwan, formed in 2012 by HIM International Music. The name of the group stands for "popular lady", which expresses the desire of the group to gain popularity through its songs and to give a girly and mature look at the same time.

== History ==
After training for a year in singing and dancing, Popu Lady debuted on December 14, 2012, with an extended play, Keep Keep Loving, and a homonymous song, being a cover of "Pretty Boy", originally recorded by the Norwegian female group M2M. Keep Keep Loving entered the top 10 best-selling chart in Taiwan when it hit the stores, and the title track's music video reached 200,000 views in six days and more than 800,000 after one month. In 2012, Popu Lady also sang "Feel Me" with Jiro Wang for TV series KO One Return soundtrack.

The group released a second EP, Popu Future, on September 13, 2013, and a third one titled More on August 22, 2014. It also sang "Honey" (Chinese: 蜜糖) for the soundtrack of a TV series, Say I Love You. Popu Lady hosted a number of variety shows, including East Network Pop U Show (Chinese: 東網 Pop U秀) from August 11, 2014, to July 17, 2015, and occasionally Love Blog (Chinese: 初戀誌). Many of its songs were featured in TV series, as Spring Love, Fall in Love with Me, and Go, Single Lady.

On August 7, 2015, the group released a digital single, "All About Him" (Chinese: 妳說他), for the official soundtrack of a 2015 feature film, Our Times. The lyrics edition of the music video was released three days later, while the official version was uploaded to the label official YouTube channel on October 20. The song ranked 24 on Billboard's China V Chart on December 12, 2015.

On September 23, 2015, HIM International Music launched the campaign "Get Out of Popu Lady" to eliminate a member of the group and make it more competitive on the market. For this purpose, an online poll was held from October 2 to November 20, 2015, to allow the public to vote one of the five members of the group out. At the same time, a reality called Get Out of Popu Lady Knockout (Chinese: Get Out Of Popu Lady淘汰賽) was launched, in which the girls displayed their skills in a series of challenges to survive. Netizens believed the poll was merely a viral marketing technique to promote the group and called for its cessation, using the symbol "5-1 = 0"; furthermore, on October 15, 2015, the poll website was hacked and voting was temporarily blocked. The result of the poll was announced on November 22 during a promotional activity of the group's fourth extended play, Gossip Girls, released two days before. According to the announcement, as Dayuan and Yushan tied, none of the five members was removed from the group. The campaign has heavily been criticized by the public as being a fraud, saying such a result was predictable and unsurprising. On the other hand, Bao'er won the survival show and got the chance to release a solo EP.

In the meantime, four songs from Gossip Girls were released as singles: "Excuse Me" was released on September 28, 2015, "Popu OK Boom" (Chinese: POPU OK繃) on October 12, "Don't Say Goodbye" (Chinese: 我不要) on October 27, with its music video the following day, and "Gossip Girls" on November 16. For its fourth extended play, Popu Lady changed their concept from cute and cheerful to sexy and dark; this reflects in the lead title track, a cover of German duo Symphobia's "I Do", which samples the Dance of the Little Swans from Pyotr Ilyich Tchaikovsky's Swan Lake. The music video was released on December 18 and the dance version on December 29. In November the group also featured in the soundtrack of Marry Me, or Not? with "Conquered Love" (Chinese: 愛.接招).

On February 29, 2016, Popu Lady performed the closing act of Taipei's Lantern Festival; the members then embarked in solo activities, from musicals to television series. On September 29, the group released its first photobook, titled Thai HOT! (Chinese: 泰HOT！). On March 7, 2017, Dayuan took a three-month hiatus to film the TV series Private Shusan College in mainland China. Hongshi did the same on April 13 to shoot Siamese Password. In 2018, Bao'er and Yushan joined Chinese series Produce 101, which aimed to form an eleven-member girl group, and got eliminated on episode 4.

In 2019, Tingxuan's and Yushan's contracts with HIM International Music expired, while Dayuan left the company, and Popu Lady quietly disbanded.

== Members ==
- Hongshi (born January 7, 1988, as 洪詩涵 Hóng Shīhán) graduated in hotel management from Jinwen University of Science and Technology. She entered the entertainment industry in 2005 hosting music programs and being part of the audition show Blackie's Teenage Club. She signed with HIM International Music in 2011. In 2014, she appeared in the music video for Ben Wu's "Don't Cry" and starred in Taiwanese TV series Say I Love You. In 2015 she made a cameo on Love Cuisine as Maggie.
- Dayuan (大元, born November 14, 1989, as 林盈臻 Lín Yíngzhēn), the group leader, studied law at Fu Jen Catholic University, but left before graduating. She debuted in 2010 on the talk show University. In 2011, she published a personal photobook, Girl Friend - Vitality Girlfriend (Chinese: Girl Friend~元氣女友). She debuted as an actress in 2012, starring in TV series Spring Love in 2013 and Love or Spend in 2015.
- Bao'er (寶兒, born January 7, 1990, as 吳昀廷 Wú Yúntíng) graduated from the University of Kang Ning. She was a swimsuit model spotted during the show Unbeatable Youth in 2008.
- Tingxuan (born March 19, 1990, as 陳庭萱 Chén Tíngxuān) graduated from the National Kaohsiung University of Hospitality and Tourism in aeronautics and transportation service management system. In 2016 she appeared in the music video for Tian Yahuo's "Our Valentine's Day" (Chinese: 我們的情人節).
- Yushan (born June 8, 1991, as 劉宇珊 Liú Yǔshān) studied business at Chung Yuan Christian University. After appearing in Juksy's Street Watch, she debuted on the variety show University in 2011 and joined HIM International Music in 2012. In 2013, she appeared in the music video for Aaron Yan's "Taipei Dreamin'" (Chinese: 台北沉睡了). In 2014, she sang "Marching Forward (Retro Version)" (Chinese: 向前走 (穿越復古版) for a feature film, Dadaocheng.

== Discography ==
=== Extended plays ===
Title	Details	Track list
Keep Keep Loving (一直一直愛)	Released: December 14, 2012; Label：HIM International Music	Song list: 1. Lady First; 2. Kiss Me; 3. Want to Turn to an Apple (好想變蘋果); 4. Keep Keep Loving (一直一直愛); 5. La La La (啦啦啦); 6. The Happiness is Just Enough (這樣的幸福剛剛好)
Popu Future (小未來)	Released：September 13, 2013; Label：HIM International Music	Song list: 1. Popu Future (小未來); 2. Mama Gave Me a Guitar 2013 (媽媽送我一個吉他2013); 3. Love Bomb (戀愛元氣彈); 4. Rock Your Night; 5. Melted (融化了)
More	Released：August 22, 2014; Label：HIM International Music	Song list: 1. More; 2. Come Dance With Me (越跳越愛); 3. Just Say It; 4. Different When With You (好好)
Gossip Girls	Released: November 20, 2015; Label: HIM International Music	Song list: 1. Excuse Me; 2. Gossip Girls (花邊女孩); 3. Popu OK Boom (POPU OK繃); 4. Don't Say Goodbye (我不要); 5. All About Him (妳說他)

=== Digital singles ===
Title	Year	Album
"Just Say It"	2014	Say I Love You OST
"All About Him" (妳說他)	2015	Our Times OST
"Excuse Me" (feat Mao Di)	2015	Gossip Girls
"Popu OK Boom" (POPU OK繃)	2015	Gossip Girls
"Don't Say Goodbye" (我不要)	2015	Gossip Girls
"Gossip Girls" (花邊女孩)	2015	Gossip Girls
"Conquered Love" (愛.接招)	2015	Marry Me, or Not? OST
"Falling for You" (栽在你手裡)	2017	Attention, Love! OST

=== Music videos ===
Year	Title
2012	"Keep Keep Loving" (一直一直愛)
2012	"Kiss Me"
2013	"Lady First"
2013	"Want to Turn to an Apple" (好想變蘋果)
2013	"Love Bomb" (戀愛元氣彈)
2013	"Mama Gave Me a Guitar 2013" (媽媽給我一個吉他2013)
2013	"Melted" (融化了)
2014	"Different When With You" (好好)
2014	"More" (多多)
2014	"More (Dance Version)"
2014	"Just Say It"
2015	"All About Him (Lyrics Version)" (你說他)
2015	"All About Him" (你說他)
2015	"Don't Say Goodbye" (我不要 Don't Say Goodbye)
2015	"Gossip Girls"
2015	"Gossip Girls (Dance Version)"

== Awards and nominations ==
Year	Awards	Category	Recipient	Result	Ref.
2013	Singapore Hit Awards	Most Downloaded Song	Want to Turn to an Apple	Nominated	
2014	2013 MusicRadio China TOP ranking	Most Popular Campus Group of the Year from Hong Kong and Taiwan	Popu Lady	Won	
2014	2013 MusicRadio China TOP ranking	Most Popular Group of the Year from Hong Kong and Taiwan	Popu Lady	Nominated	
2014	2013 MusicRadio China TOP ranking	Best Group of the Year from Hong Kong and Taiwan	Popu Lady	Nominated	
2014	Singapore Entertainment Awards	Most Popular Group	Popu Lady	Nominated	
2014	Singapore Entertainment Awards	Most Popular MV - C-pop	Love Bomb	Nominated	
2014	Hito Pop Music Awards	Group With the Most Potential	Popu Lady	Won	
2014	Hito Pop Music Awards	Most Popular Group	Popu Lady	Nominated	
2015	Global Chinese Music Golden Chart	People's Choice - New Group	Popu Lady	Nominated	
2015	Hito Pop Music Awards	Most Popular Group	Popu Lady	Nominated	
2015	Hito Pop Music Awards	Popular Campus Group	Popu Lady	Won	
2015	Milk Awards	Popular Artist or Group of the Year	Popu Lady	Won	
2015	2014 MusicRadio China TOP ranking	Most Popular Group of the Year	Popu Lady	Nominated	
2015	2014 MusicRadio China TOP ranking	Most Popular Campus Group of the Year	Popu Lady	Nominated	
2015	2014 MusicRadio China TOP ranking	Best Group of the Year	Popu Lady	Nominated	
2016	Hito Pop Music Awards	Most Popular Group	Popu Lady	Nominated	
2016	2015 MusicRadio China TOP ranking	Most Popular Group of the Year	Popu Lady	Nominated	
2016	2015 MusicRadio China TOP ranking	Most Popular Campus Group of the Year	Popu Lady	Nominated	
2016	Global Chinese Music Awards	Most Popular Group	Popu Lady	Nominated	
