= Nylon Chen =

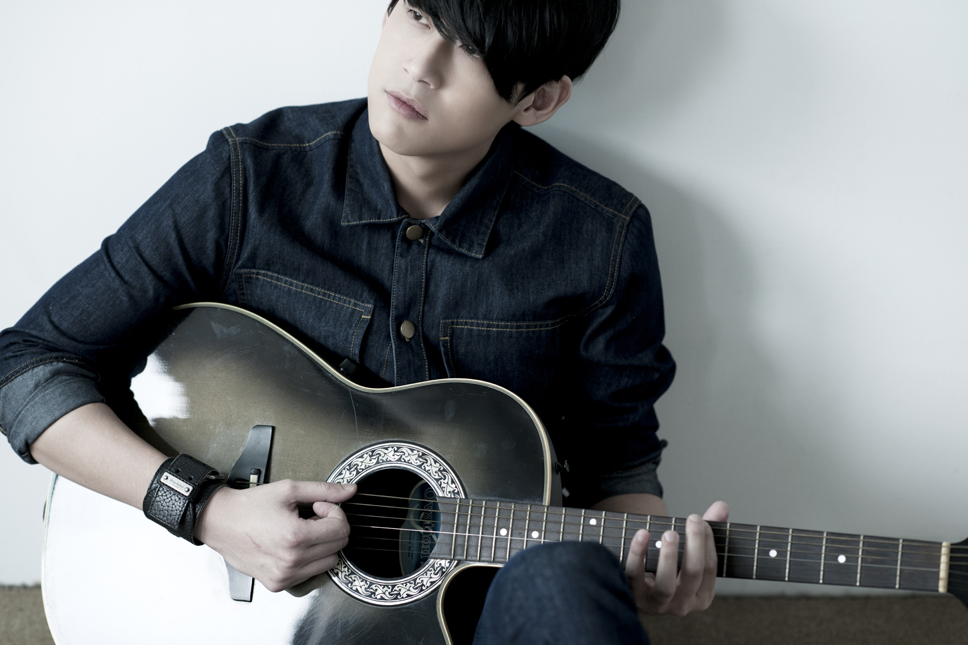
- Born: 20 May 1981 (age 45); Taipei, Taiwan
- Occupations: Singer; actor
- Years active: 2009–present
- Spouse: Lene Lai

Chinese name
- Traditional Chinese: 陳乃榮
- Simplified Chinese: 陈乃荣
Transcriptions
Standard Mandarin
- Hanyu Pinyin: Chén Nǎiróng
Hakka
- Pha̍k-fa-sṳ: Chhîn Nái-yîn
Yue: Cantonese
- Jyutping: Can4 Naai5 Wing4
Southern Min
- Hokkien POJ: Tân Nái-êng
- Musical career
- Origin: Taiwan
- Genres: Mandopop
- Instruments: Vocals, guitar, keyboard
- Labels: Avex Taiwan (2005–2007); B'in Music Co. Ltd (2009–2011); Rock Records (2012–present)
- Website: Official blog

Nylon Chen (Chinese: 陳乃榮; pinyin: Chén Nǎiróng; Jyutping: Can4 Naai5 Wing4; Pe̍h-ōe-jī: Tân Nái-êng; Pha̍k-fa-sṳ: Chhîn Nái-yîn; born 20 May 1981) is a Taiwanese singer and actor.

== Biography ==
=== Background ===
Nylon Chen was born on May 20, 1981, in Taipei, Taiwan.

=== Acting career ===
Before officially debuting, Chen first appeared in 2008's Honey and Clover series starring Joe Cheng and Janine Chang, playing the character of Lu Shan Qi. He began acting as a second male lead in 2011 for his character role in Happy Dandelion alongside Lene Lai. He, then, continued participating in various television dramas as part of the supporting cast or as a guest. He also tried dubbing the voice of Korean actor-singer Siwon of Super Junior in manga-turned-series Skip Beat in 2011.

He participated in two more television dramas as a second male lead, particularly in Spring Love and Deja Vu in 2012 and 2013 respectively. In 2014, he received his first role as a male lead, playing the character Huang Shi Jia. In preparation, Chen exercised more than before from weight training to running, as well as eating more meat and vegetables, and taking high-protein supplements for better fitness.

=== Music career ===
Besides his acting career, Nylon Chen is also a singer-songwriter and is good in playing the keyboards. He calls himself 'musical zhainan' (音樂宅男), because he mostly spends his time at home (zhainan means 'recluse'), writing and composing songs. He also loves performing live and be able to interact with other musicians.

"Writing a song is like falling in love. You have to safeguard that precious instinct or the politics of the music business will rob you of it." — Nylon Chen

His debut album entitled Paradise was released on July 15, 2009, under Believe In Music. The ten tracks in the album were chosen from over 300 songs written by himself. The album peaked at 4 at G-Music Charts on the first week of its release, and managed to reach the third spot on its second week.

In the span of three years since his album release, he spent most of his days writing songs. He managed to create over 100 songs for his upcoming album, mostly talks about "a musician dealing with personal struggles". On July 7, 2012, Chen released his second album Same Species (同種異類) under Rock Records, which landed at number 4 at G-Music Charts. Besides participating in its production, the eleven-track album was entirely written and composed by Chen, himself. He then held a concert entitled One Man Nakashi (一個人的那卡西) on October 13 at 4 pm at Legacy Taipei concert to promote his album.

He also composes original soundtracks for television dramas, such as "Summon Beast" and "Spring" in K.O.3an Guo and Happy Dandelion series respectively, and advertisement songs, which includes "Jasmine Tea" (茉莉茶園) by Taiwanese girl-group S.H.E. In fact, just after the end of KO One Re-act series, Chen was asked to write a theme song within a day for 做自己的英雄 short film.

== Filmography ==
=== Television series ===
Year	English title	Original title	Character/Role
2008	Honey and Clover	蜂蜜幸運草	Lu Shan Qi
2009	K.O.3an Guo	終極三國	Cao Cao
2010	The Gifts	女王不下班	Josh
2011	Happy Dandelion	幸福蒲公英	高宗南
2011	Skip Beat!	華麗的挑戰	Dun Helian (voice dub)
2012	What Is Love	花是愛	Albert
2012	Spring Love	美人龍湯	Zhao Ren Hu
2013	Fabulous Boys	原來是美男	Gao Cai Yin
2013	KO ONE Re-act	終極一班3	Cao Ji Li
2013	Kiss Me Mom!	媽，親一下！	Wang Bin
2013	Deja Vu	回到愛以前	Fang Qi Xiang
2014	Tie the Knot	媽咪的男朋友	Huang Shi Jia
2014			鄒炯如
2015	Baby Daddy	長不大的爸爸	Hu Minghan
2015	Be With You	好想談戀愛	Zhao Liqi
2017	The Perfect Match	極品絕配	Huo Tian Zhi
2017	Memory Love		
2019	Deja Vu		

== Discography ==
=== Studio albums ===
Year	Title	Album details	Peak positions	Sales and certifications
2009	Paradise	Release Date: July 14, 2009; Label: Believe in Music	3	–
2012	Same Species	Released: July 7, 2012; Label: Rock Records	4	–
"—" denotes releases that did not chart or were not released in that region.

=== Soundtrack contributions ===
Year	Title	OST
2009	"Summon Beast"	K.O.3an Guo
2011	"Spring"	Happy Dandelion
2012	"Only Wanna Hold You"	Gung Hay Fat Choy
2012	"Heard"	Say That You Love Me
2012	"At Last"	Say That You Love Me
2012	"終於"	Say That You Love Me
2012	"Dismay"	Spring Love
2012	"Long"	Spring Love
2012	"Radiance"	Spring Love
2012	"The Last Thing I Do For You"	Spring Love
2014	"After Saying 'I Love You'	Tie the Knot

=== Production credits ===
Year	Song	Artist	Role	Album
2009	"不再"	himself	lyricist	Paradise
2009	"Lies" (謊言)	himself	lyricist	Paradise
2009	"No Longer" (不再)	himself	lyricist	Paradise
2009	"Paradise"	himself	lyricist	Paradise
2009	"靈魂的定力"	himself	lyricist	Paradise
2009	"Summon Beast" (召喚獸)	himself	composer	Paradise
2012	"Heard" (聽見)	himself	lyricist and composer	Same Species
2012	"Only Wanna Hold You" (只想抱著你)	himself	lyricist and composer	Same Species
2012	"Can't Tell Me" (不能告訴我)	himself	lyricist and composer	Same Species
2012	"終於"	himself	lyricist and composer	Same Species
2012	"覺醒"	himself	lyricist and composer	Same Species
2012	"廉價的祝福"	himself	lyricist and composer	Same Species
2012	"守候"	himself	lyricist and composer	Same Species
2012	"憐憫的快樂"	himself	lyricist and composer	Same Species
2012	"同種異類"	himself	lyricist and composer	Same Species
2012	"Spring" (春)	himself	lyricist and composer	Same Species
2012	"一個人的那卡西"	himself	lyricist and composer	Same Species
2013	"Grow Up" (長大)	himself	lyricist	Non-album single
2013	"為你做的最後一件事"	himself	lyricist	Non-album single
2013	"狼狽"	himself	composer	Non-album single
2013	"做自己的英雄"	himself	composer	Non-album single

=== Concerts ===
Year	Concert Title	Details
2012	One Man Nakashi (一個人的那卡西)	Venue: Legacy Taipei concert; Date: October 13, 2012
2014	今晚.是否你也想著我	Venue: Legacy Taipei Teaching Music Performance Space; Date: October 25, 2014

== Awards and nominations ==
Year	Ceremony	Category	Work	Result
2009	Singapore Hit Awards	Best Newcomer Award	Paradise	Nominated
2009	Yahoo! Search Popularity Awards	Booming Taiwan Male Artist	—N/a	Won
