= Alvin Chau =

Macanese businessman and criminal

Alvin Chau Cheok-wa
- 周焯華
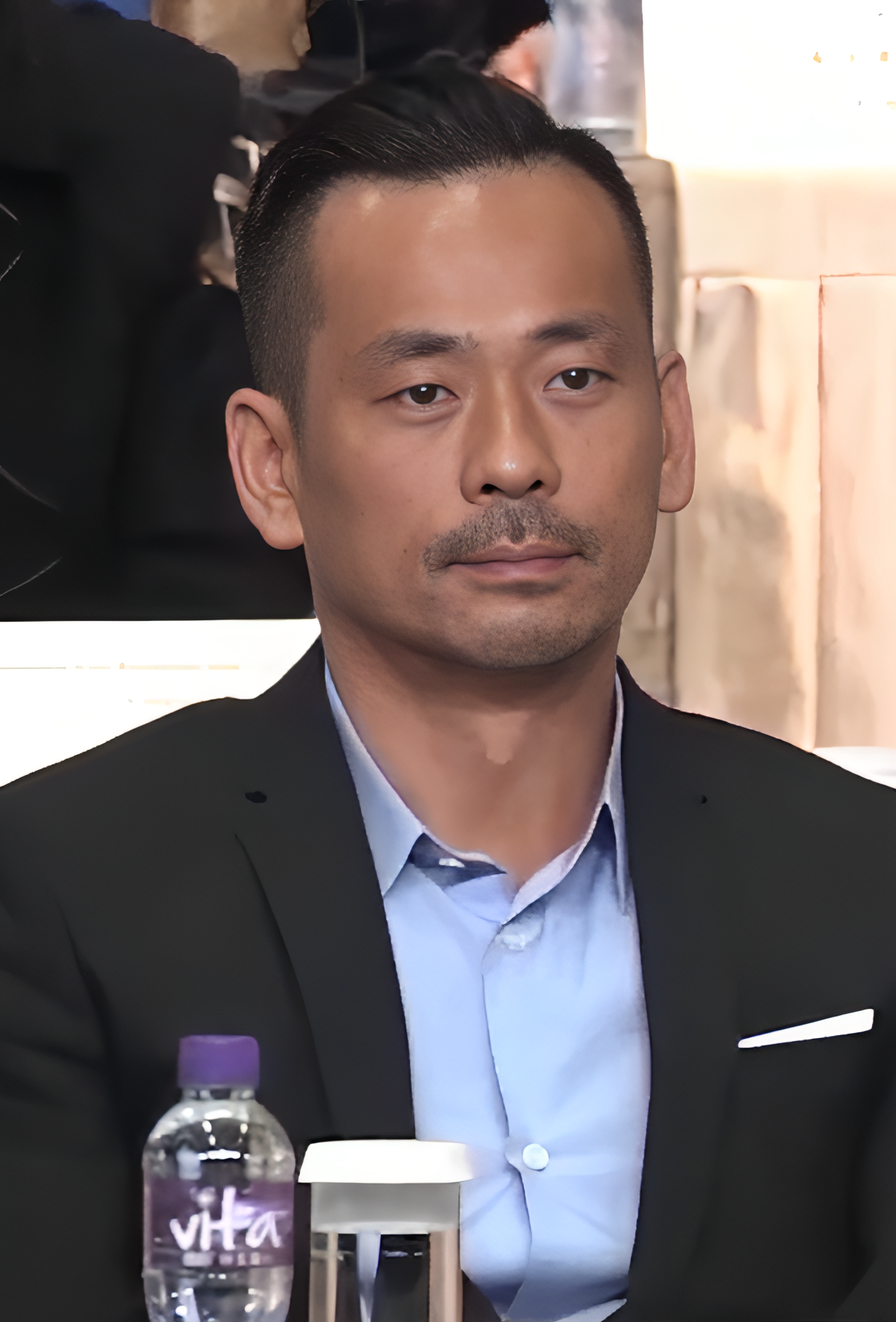
- Born: May 30, 1974 (age 51); Macau
- Other names: Sai Mai-wa
- Occupation: Businessman/mafia
- Spouses: Yang Su-mei; Heidi Chan (m. 2002)
- Partner: Mandy Lau (2014-2019)
- Children: 7

Alvin Chau Cheok-wa (Chinese: 周焯華; Jyutping: zau1 coek3 waa4), nicknamed Sai Mai-wa (Chinese: 洗米華; lit. 'wash rice Wah'), is a Macanese-born businessman and founder of Suncity Group.

== Career ==
Chau is the founder and CEO of Suncity, the largest junket operator in Macau. At times, the company controlled almost 50% of the VIP gaming business in Macau.

Chau is a former member of the Chinese People's Political Consultative Conference's Guangdong Provincial Committee.

== Prosecution ==
On November 28, 2021, Chau was arrested on a warrant issued by the city of Wenzhou. The arrest warrant was based on allegations of illegal cross-border casino operations and money laundering. Along with Chau, ten alleged accomplices were arrested. Within a week of Chau's arrest, Suncity closed all of its VIP rooms in Macau.

He was convicted in January 2023 of leading a criminal syndicate, and running illegal gambling and fraud operations, and sentenced to 18 years in prison.

Law enforcement authorities around the world have continued to uncover Chau's vast connections to some of southeast Asia's most prolific drug trafficking and cyber-enabled fraud networks, among other criminal groups, according to the UN Office on Drugs and Crime.
