= Say I Love You (2014 TV series) =

2014 Taiwanese television series

- Promo poster
- 勇敢說出我愛你
- Genre: Romance; Comedy
- Directed by: Ming Chin-cheng
- Starring: Mike He; Ko Chia-yen; Ella Wilkins
- Opening theme: "Just Say It" by Popu Lady
- Ending theme: "Lost and Found" by Selina Jen
- Country of origin: Taiwan
- Original language: Mandarin
- No. of series: 1
- No. of episodes: 16

Production
- Producer: Hu Ning Yuan
- Production location: Taiwan
- Running time: 90 minutes
- Production companies: Chung T'ien Television; Chorokbaem Media; CN Plus Productions

Original release
- Network: CTV
- Release: 15 June – 28 September 2014

Related
- The Lying Game

Say I Love You (Chinese: 勇敢說出我愛你; pinyin: Yǒnggǎn Shuōchū Wǒ ài Nǐ) is a 2014 Taiwanese romance comedy television series starring Mike He, Ko Chia-yen and Ella Wilkins. The series is about a single father who rediscovers love and a new career. Filming began on March 13, 2014 and finished filming on June 15, 2014. The 16-episode series began airing on CTV on June 15, 2014 every Sunday night at 10:00 PM with episodes re-broadcasting on cable channel CTiTV every following Saturday night at 10:00 PM. The final episode aired on September 28, 2013.

== Cast ==
=== Main cast ===
- Mike He as Shi Pei Ran
- Ko Chia-yen as Chen Yi Jun
- Ella Wilkins as Shi Liang Yu

=== Extended cast ===
- Lin Mei-hsiu as Chen Yue Xia
- Michael Huang as Qiang Ge
- Chang Chin-lan as Guo Qiao Fei
- Hongshi as Wang Xiao Wei
- Jet Chao as Wang Wei Ren
- Pang Yong Zhi as Jin Jin Yong
- Li Chen Xiang as Ni Yu Chen
- Gina Lin as Ni Yu Heng
- Xie Fei as Wang Bai Han

=== Cameo ===
- Patrick Lee as Shi Da Wei, Yi Jun's ex-boss (ep 1)
- Yang Qi as Qiao Fei's step-mother

== Soundtrack ==
- Forever Forever (永遠永遠) by James Morris-Cotterill
- Similar Happy (類似快樂) by Where Chou
- Different When With You (好好) by Popu Lady
- Honey (蜜糖) by Popu Lady
- Just Say It by Popu Lady
- Lost and Found (迷路) by Selina Jen
- Splashing Song (潑水歌) by Mike He & Ella Wilkins

== Broadcast ==
Channel	Country	Airing Date	Timeslot
CTV	Taiwan	June 15, 2014	Sunday 10:00 PM
CTiTV	Taiwan	June 21, 2014	Saturday 10:00 PM
