= Spring Love =

- promotional poster
- Also known as: Onsen Beauty
- 美人龍湯
- Genre: Romance, Drama
- Directed by: Jim Wang
- Starring: Mike He, DaYuan Lin, Sato Mai, Nylon Chen
- Opening theme: "好想變蘋果" by Popu Lady
- Ending theme: "被忘錄" by Aaron Yan
- Country of origin: Republic of China (Taiwan)
- Original languages: Mandarin; Japanese
- No. of series: 1
- No. of episodes: 14

Production
- Production location: Taiwan
- Running time: 90 minutes
- Production company: GTV

Original release
- Network: FTV, GTV
- Release: 27 January – 5 May 2013

Related
- The Queen of SOP; Fabulous Boys

Spring Love (Chinese: 美人龍湯) is a 2013 Taiwanese idol television drama series. The show was produced and filmed by GTV and stars Mike He as the main male lead with DaYuan Lin from Taiwanese girl group Popu Lady as the main female lead. The show started filming on August 13, 2012 and will continue to film till February 1, 2013. The first episode aired on January 27, 2013 on FTV.

== Synopsis ==
After his mother's death, Long Tai (Mike He) returns to Taiwan in search of his long lost father and twin brother. When people mistake him for his brother, who has left the country, he perpetuates the mistake; the change does not go unnoticed by his brother's foe, Zhao Ren Hu (Nylon Chen), who has planned on defeating Long Tian He (Mike He). In a festival competition, Zhao tries to take over Long's hot spring, but is defeated by Long Tai: as per agreement, Zhao sends his sister (DaYuan Lin) to Long's house to work as an indenture servant for a year, but secretly orders her to spy on Long. But his sister has other things in mind.

== Cast and characters ==
Actor	Role	Details
Mike He	Long Tian He (龍天賀) / Long Tai or Long Tian Hao (龍太 or 龍天豪)	Mike He acting as twins
DaYuan Lin	Zhao Ren Mei (趙人美)	The main female character, has a crush on Long Tai
Sato Mai	Bei-ye Wen Zi (北野溫子)	Long Tai's friend from Japan, she also secretly has a crush on Long Tai.
Nylon Chen	Zhao Ren Hu (趙人虎)	Ren Mei's older brother, hates Tian He and he has a crush on Wen Zi

== Soundtrack ==
Note: Some song titles are in Chinese without English titles.

Use	Title	Singer
Opening Theme	好想變蘋果 (Want To Turn To an Apple)	Popu Lady
Ending Theme	被忘錄 (Memo)	Aaron Yan
Incidental music	同種異類 (Spring)	Nylon Chen
Incidental music	覺醒 (Awakeness)	Nylon Chen
Incidental music	一個人的那卡西 (One Man Nakashi)	Nylon Chen
Incidental music	為你做的最後一件事	Nylon Chen
Incidental music	長大	Nylon Chen
Incidental music	光芒	Nylon Chen
Incidental music	狼狽	Nylon Chen
Incidental music	對了我錯了	Olivia Ong
Incidental music	我們結婚吧	Jessica Song
Incidental music	這樣的幸福剛剛好 (The Happiness Is Just Enough)	Popu Lady

== Episode ratings ==
Date of Broadcast	Episode	Ratings	Rank	Note
27 January 2013	01	1.14	2	Pilot episode
3 February 2013	02	1.13	2	
17 February 2013	03	1.05	2	
24 February 2013	04	1.09	2	
3 March 2013	05	0.98	2	
10 March 2013	06	1.16	2	
17 March 2013	07	1.13	2	
24 March 2013	08	1.01	2	
31 March 2013	09	1.21	2	
7 April 2013	10	1.11	2	
14 April 2013	11	1.05	2	
21 April 2013	12	1.18	2	
28 April 2013	13	1.13	2	
5 May 2013	14	1.11	2	
Average	-	1.11	2	-

== Broadcast ==
Note: The time in the timeslot section is listed according to the Time in Taiwan.

Country	Network	Timeslot	Episode premiere
Taiwan	FTV	Sundays, 10PM	January 27, 2013
Taiwan	GTV	Saturdays, 9PM	February 2, 2013
Singapore	MediaCorp Channel U	Saturdays, 9:30PM	March 9, 2013
