= Golden Bell Award for Best Leading Actress in a Television Series =

Taiwanese television awards for Best Actress

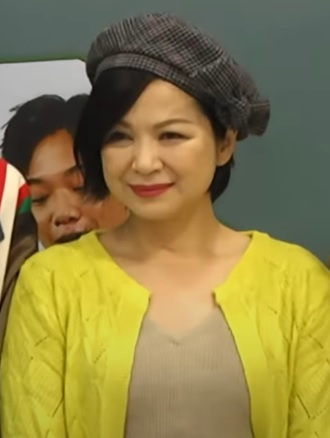
- The 2026 recipient: Yang Kuei-mei
- Awarded for: Best Leading Actress of the Year in a Television Series
- Country: Taiwan
- Presented by: Golden Bell Awards
- First award: 1980
- Currently held by: Yang Kuei-mei for The World Between Us: After The Flames (2026)
- Website: gba.tavis.tw

The Golden Bell Award for Best Leading Actress in a Television Series (Chinese: 電視金鐘獎戲劇節目女主角獎; pinyin: Diànshì jīn zhōng jiǎng xìjù jiémù nǚ zhǔjiǎo jiǎng) is one of the categories of the competition for the Taiwanese television production, Golden Bell Awards. It was presented annually by the Government Information Office until 2011, when the Bureau of Audiovisual and Music Industry Development assumed responsibility for the Golden Bell Award ceremony. The first time that television programs were first eligible to be awarded was in 1971.

== Winners and nominees ==
The Best Leading Actress in a Television Series category was first awarded in 1980.

=== 1980s ===
Year	Actress	English title	Original title	Ref
1980; 15th Golden Bell Awards
1980; 15th Golden Bell Awards	Sally Chen	Li Hua	台視劇場－李花	
1980; 15th Golden Bell Awards	Liu Ming	Lee's Daughter-In-Law	名劇精選－李家嫂子	
1980; 15th Golden Bell Awards	Kwan Yi	Tomorrow is Sunday	名劇精選－明天就是星期天	
1981; 16th Golden Bell Awards
1981; 16th Golden Bell Awards	Chen Li-li	Jiangnan Travel	江南遊	
1981; 16th Golden Bell Awards	Josephine Siao	Autumn Water & Vast Sky	秋水長天	
1981; 16th Golden Bell Awards	Lin Mei-chao	Memories of An Old Love	舊情綿綿	
1982; 17th Golden Bell Awards
1982; 17th Golden Bell Awards	Chang Hsiao-yen	Reaching for the Stars	今夜摘星去	
1983; 18th Golden Bell Awards
1983; 18th Golden Bell Awards	Julie Lee	Gold Theatre	歸情	
1984; 19th Golden Bell Awards
1984; 19th Golden Bell Awards	Sally Chen	The General Manager	金獎劇場－再見總經理	
1984; 19th Golden Bell Awards	Wu Ching-hsien	Star Knows My Heart	星星知我心	
1984; 19th Golden Bell Awards	Gua Ah-leh	Silver Threads Among The Gold	午夜劇場－白髮吟	
1985; 20th Golden Bell Awards
1985; 20th Golden Bell Awards	Yu Su-shan	Hong Kong 1952	香港一九五二	
1985; 20th Golden Bell Awards	Ma Chi-chin	Last Night Stars	創作劇坊－昨夜星辰	
1985; 20th Golden Bell Awards	Angela Pan	One Plus One Does Not Equal Two	金獎劇場－一加一不等於二：瓜田李下	
1986; 21st Golden Bell Awards
1986; 21st Golden Bell Awards	Li Tang-ying	Home of Hearts	台視劇展－心居	
1986; 21st Golden Bell Awards	Fang Fang	Cloud's Hometown	國語連續劇－雲的故鄉第一集	
1986; 21st Golden Bell Awards	Ma Chi-chin	Home	創作劇坊－家	
1987; 22nd Golden Bell Awards
1987; 22nd Golden Bell Awards	Julie Lee	Another Voice	中視劇展－另一種聲音	
1987; 22nd Golden Bell Awards	Tseng Ya-chun	Handing Her To You	華視劇展-把她交給你	
1987; 22nd Golden Bell Awards	Hu Chin	Storm Over the Yangtze River	創作劇坊－揚子江風雲	
1987; 22nd Golden Bell Awards	Angela Pan	Happy Home, All is Well	家和萬事興	
1987; 22nd Golden Bell Awards	Leanne Liu	Many Enchanting Nights	幾度夕陽紅	
1988; 23rd Golden Bell Awards
1988; 23rd Golden Bell Awards	Chen Chiu-yen	Sunlight Comes	華視劇展－陽光每天都來過	
1988; 23rd Golden Bell Awards	Ku Yin	Deep Garden	庭院深深	
1988; 23rd Golden Bell Awards	Chen Shu-li	Forgiveness	爸爸原諒我	
1988; 23rd Golden Bell Awards	Angela Pan	Song Queen of the Age	一代歌后	
1988; 23rd Golden Bell Awards	Leanne Liu	Deep Garden	庭院深深	
1989; 24th Golden Bell Awards
1989; 24th Golden Bell Awards	Li Hui-tuan	Burning Cash	台視劇場－錢在燒	
1989; 24th Golden Bell Awards	Lee Lee-feng	Moment in Peking	京華煙雲	
1989; 24th Golden Bell Awards	Kuan Ching-hua	Moment in Peking	京華煙雲	
1989; 24th Golden Bell Awards	Gua Ah-leh	The Accused	中視劇場－大地有愛系列: 控訴	

=== 1990s ===
Year	Actress	English title	Original title	Ref
1990; 25th Golden Bell Awards
1990; 25th Golden Bell Awards	Ma Chi-chin	Wo Er Jun Xiao	中視劇場－我兒俊孝	
1990; 25th Golden Bell Awards	Emi Lee	Bring Back My Love	把愛找回來	
1990; 25th Golden Bell Awards	Hsia Ling-ling	There is Love	紅塵有愛	
1991; 26th Golden Bell Awards
1991; 26th Golden Bell Awards	Crystal Chang	Mo Dai Er Nv Qing	末代兒女情	
1991; 26th Golden Bell Awards	Gua Ah-leh	Her Growing	她的成長	
1991; 26th Golden Bell Awards	Leanne Liu	Six Dreams	六個夢－啞妻	
1992; 27th Golden Bell Awards
1992; 27th Golden Bell Awards	Kao Chin Su-mei	Love	愛	
1992; 27th Golden Bell Awards	Leanne Liu	Love in the Wind	床邊愛情故事－風裡的愛	
1992; 27th Golden Bell Awards	Leanne Liu	Xue Ke	雪珂	
1993; 28th Golden Bell Awards
1993; 28th Golden Bell Awards	Lee Lee-feng	Execution in Autumn	經典劇場－秋決	
1993; 28th Golden Bell Awards	Hsiao Ai	A Family Likes Ours	經典劇場-像我們這樣一個家	
1993; 28th Golden Bell Awards	Chang Chin	Father's Eyes	中視劇場－悲歡人生系列：爸爸的眼睛	
1994; 29th Golden Bell Awards
1994; 29th Golden Bell Awards	n/a (Note: During this time, Television and Radio broadcasting were awarded alternatively. This year, it was Radio Broadcasting."Archived copy". Archived from the original on 2014-10-18..)			
1995; 30th Golden Bell Awards
1995; 30th Golden Bell Awards	Cecilia Yip	The Heaven Sword and Dragon Saber	倚天屠龍記	
1995; 30th Golden Bell Awards	Wang Mei-hsueh	Phoenix & Dragon	鳳子龍孫	
1995; 30th Golden Bell Awards	Leanne Liu	Justice Pao - The Execution of Chen Shimei	包青天－鍘美案	
1996; 31st Golden Bell Awards
1996; 31st Golden Bell Awards	n/a			
1997; 32nd Golden Bell Awards
1997; 32nd Golden Bell Awards	Yue Ling	Hua Luo Hua Kai	花落花開	
1997; 32nd Golden Bell Awards	Gua Ah-leh	Blessed Virgin Mary	金獎劇展－聖母瑪利亞	
1997; 32nd Golden Bell Awards	Si Man-ning	Qi Xi Hua	中視劇場-七夕花	
1997; 32nd Golden Bell Awards	Chen Meifeng	The Taiwan Folklore	台灣水滸傳	
1997; 32nd Golden Bell Awards	Gua Ah-leh	The Trio	人間抒情系列-她們三個	
1998; 33rd Golden Bell Awards
1998; 33rd Golden Bell Awards	n/a			
1999; 34th Golden Bell Awards
1999; 34th Golden Bell Awards	Ko Shu-chin	Chun Zi Yu Xiu Duan	春子與秀緞	
1999; 34th Golden Bell Awards	Yang Kuei-mei	God Loves Good Men	天公疼好人	
1999; 34th Golden Bell Awards	Pai Bing-bing	Our Beloved Mother	春天後母心	
1999; 34th Golden Bell Awards	Wang Mei-hsueh	The First Stitch	民視作家劇場-在室男	
1999; 34th Golden Bell Awards	Augustine Yeh	Yan Tian Er Nv	鹽田兒女	

=== 2000s ===
Year	Actress	English title	Original title	Ref
2000; 35th Golden Bell Awards
2000; 35th Golden Bell Awards	Chen Shu-fang	The Lost Name	失落的名字	
2000; 35th Golden Bell Awards	Rene Liu	Mother Living in the Cross	千禧劇展—住在十字架裡的母親	
2000; 35th Golden Bell Awards	Samantha Ko	In Hand	牽手	
2000; 35th Golden Bell Awards	Nana Tang	Taiwan Jade	台灣玉	
2000; 35th Golden Bell Awards	Josie Leung	Moving House	搬家	
2001; 36th Golden Bell Awards
2001; 36th Golden Bell Awards	Sonny Su	Sky and Earth Has Affection	天地有情	
2001; 36th Golden Bell Awards	Tang Mei-yun	Beigang Burner	北港香爐	
2001; 36th Golden Bell Awards	Samantha Ko	Wake Up, Mom	大愛劇場－阿母醒來吧	
2001; 36th Golden Bell Awards	Fang Wen-lin	Rogue Professor	流氓教授	
2001; 36th Golden Bell Awards	Barbie Hsu	Meteor Garden	流星花園	
2002; 37th Golden Bell Awards
2002; 37th Golden Bell Awards	Chen Meifeng	The Road of Life	世間路	
2002; 37th Golden Bell Awards	Lily Tien	Bi Ya Su Na	違章天堂	
2002; 37th Golden Bell Awards	Chang Mei-yao	The Sun Shines First Behind the Mountain	後山日先照	
2002; 37th Golden Bell Awards	Joy Pan	Zhen Nu Lie Nu Hao Fang Nu	貞女、烈女、豪放女	
2002; 37th Golden Bell Awards	Leanne Liu	Misty Rain in Jiangnan	煙雨江南	
2003; 38th Golden Bell Awards
2003; 38th Golden Bell Awards	Chiu Hsiu-min	Back	背影	
2003; 38th Golden Bell Awards	Samantha Ko	Crystal Boys	孽子	
2003; 38th Golden Bell Awards	Chang Mei-yao	Home	家	
2003; 38th Golden Bell Awards	Hsieh Chiung-hsuan	Sprout	新芽	
2003; 38th Golden Bell Awards	Michelle Ho	Jin Gui	錦貴	
2004; 39th Golden Bell Awards
2004; 39th Golden Bell Awards	Ray Fan	Angels are Talking	人間關懷劇場-天使正在對話	
2004; 39th Golden Bell Awards	Wanfang	Cold Fronts	冷鋒過境	
2004; 39th Golden Bell Awards	Yang Kuei-mei	Quartet	四重奏	
2004; 39th Golden Bell Awards	Shen Shih-hua	Dancing in the Dark	在黑暗中漫舞	
2004; 39th Golden Bell Awards	Chen Ming-jen	Love Arrives	愛情來了	
2005; 40th Golden Bell Awards
2005; 40th Golden Bell Awards	Tsai Chia-hung	Bring Back My Love	把愛找回來	
2005; 40th Golden Bell Awards	Wang Chuan	A Story of Soldiers	再見，忠貞二村	
2005; 40th Golden Bell Awards	Hsiao Shu-shen	Love's Lone Flower	孤戀花	
2005; 40th Golden Bell Awards	Yang Li-yin	Golden Sea and Clear Sky	金海清空	
2005; 40th Golden Bell Awards	Augustine Yeh	Song of the Waves	浪淘沙	
2006; 41st Golden Bell Awards
2006; 41st Golden Bell Awards	Lee Chia-ying	Mico, Go!	米可，GO！	
2006; 41st Golden Bell Awards	Yang Li-yin	Spring Light of the Grass Mountain	大愛劇場：草山春暉	
2006; 41st Golden Bell Awards	Ella Chen	Reaching for the Stars	真命天女	
2006; 41st Golden Bell Awards	Sonny Su	A Room With a View	窗外有藍天	
2006; 41st Golden Bell Awards	Angela Chang	Bump Off Lover	愛殺17	
2007; 42nd Golden Bell Awards	Si Man-ning	Life Outside	出外人生	
2007; 42nd Golden Bell Awards	Gail Lin	Clear Night	大愛劇場－晚晴	
2007; 42nd Golden Bell Awards	Francesca Kao	Beautiful Dawn	大愛劇場－美麗晨曦	
2007; 42nd Golden Bell Awards	Alice Huang	Sago Palm Blossoms	鐵樹花開	
2007; 42nd Golden Bell Awards	Hsieh Chiung-hsuan	Love's Promise	愛的約定	
2008; 43rd Golden Bell Awards	Kelly Ko	Gold Line	大愛劇場－黃金線	
2008; 43rd Golden Bell Awards	Ariel Lin	They Kiss Again	惡作劇2吻	
2008; 43rd Golden Bell Awards	Joe Chen	Fated to Love You	命中注定我愛你	
2008; 43rd Golden Bell Awards	Angela Chang	Romantic Princess	公主小妹	
2008; 43rd Golden Bell Awards	Rainie Yang	Why Why Love	換換愛	
2009; 44th Golden Bell Awards	Lee Kang-i	Justice For Love	天平上的馬爾濟斯	
2009; 44th Golden Bell Awards	Tammy Chen	Time Story	光陰的故事	
2009; 44th Golden Bell Awards	Fion Fu	You Are My Only	你是我的唯一	
2009; 44th Golden Bell Awards	Cheryl Yang	My Queen	敗犬女王	
2009; 44th Golden Bell Awards	Linda Liu	Marriage of Three Daughters	客家劇場－女仨的婚事	

=== 2010s ===
Year	Actress	English title	Original title	Ref
2010; 45th Golden Bell Awards	Bianca Bai	Shining Days	閃亮的日子	
2010; 45th Golden Bell Awards	Francesca Kao	Light	大愛長情劇展－曙光	
2010; 45th Golden Bell Awards	Amber Kuo	The Year of Happiness and Love	那一年的幸福時光	
2010; 45th Golden Bell Awards	Rainie Yang	Hi My Sweetheart	海派甜心	
2010; 45th Golden Bell Awards	Jian Man-shu	Year of the Rain	那年，雨不停國	
2011; 46th Golden Bell Awards	Megan Lai	Invaluable Treasure 1949	瑰寶1949	
2011; 46th Golden Bell Awards	Sonia Sui	The Fierce Wife	犀利人妻	
2011; 46th Golden Bell Awards	Sara Yu	I Love US Dollars	大愛劇場－我愛美金	
2011; 46th Golden Bell Awards	Yao Han-yi	Somewhere Over The Sky	雲頂天很藍	
2011; 46th Golden Bell Awards	Tien Hsin	Who’s The One	我的完美男人	
2012; 47th Golden Bell Awards	June Tsai	Way Back Into Love	愛。回來	
2012; 47th Golden Bell Awards	Lee Chien-na	Ex-boyfriend	前男友	
2012; 47th Golden Bell Awards	Lee Kang-i	Man‧Boy	小孩大人	
2012; 47th Golden Bell Awards	Ariel Lin	In Time with You	我可能不會愛你	
2012; 47th Golden Bell Awards	Alice Huang	Innocence	客家劇場—阿戇妹	
2013; 48th Golden Bell Awards
2013; 48th Golden Bell Awards	Elten Ting	My Summer Adventure	客家劇場—阿婆的夏令營	
2013; 48th Golden Bell Awards	Miao Ke-li	Flavor of Life	含笑食堂	
2013; 48th Golden Bell Awards	Jade Chou	Falling	含苞欲墜的每一天	
2013; 48th Golden Bell Awards	Zaizai Lin	An Innocent Mistake	罪美麗	
2013; 48th Golden Bell Awards	Nikki Hsieh	Die Sterntaler	白色之戀	
2014; 49th Golden Bell Awards
2014; 49th Golden Bell Awards	Tien Hsin	A Good Wife	親愛的，我愛上別人了	
2014; 49th Golden Bell Awards	Chung Hsin-ling	Sun After The Rain	雨後驕陽	
2014; 49th Golden Bell Awards	Sandrine Pinna	Amour et Pâtisserie	沒有名字的甜點店	
2014; 49th Golden Bell Awards	Cheryl Yang	The Queen!	女王的誕生	
2014; 49th Golden Bell Awards	Yen Yi-wen	Lonely River	客家劇場—在河左岸	
2015; 50th Golden Bell Awards
2015; 50th Golden Bell Awards	Ruby Lin	The Way We Were	16個夏天	
2015; 50th Golden Bell Awards	Zhu Zhi-ying	Brave Forward	客家劇場—新丁花開	
2015; 50th Golden Bell Awards	Huang Pei-jia	Long Day's Journey into Light	客家劇場—出境事務所	
2015; 50th Golden Bell Awards	Yang Ko-han	The New World	新世界	
2015; 50th Golden Bell Awards	Janel Tsai	CSIC: I Hero	C.S.I.C鑑識英雄	
2016; 51st Golden Bell Awards
2016; 51st Golden Bell Awards	Lee Chien-na	The Day I Lost You	失去你的那一天	
2016; 51st Golden Bell Awards	Ko Chia-yen	Marry Me, or Not?	必娶女人	
2016; 51st Golden Bell Awards	Gail Lin	Life Is Full of Beauty	吉姊當家	
2016; 51st Golden Bell Awards	Cindy Lien	A Touch of Green	一把青	
2016; 51st Golden Bell Awards	Cheryl Yang	A Touch of Green	一把青	
2017; 52nd Golden Bell Awards
2017; 52nd Golden Bell Awards	Queenie Fang	Reborn from the Dust	蘇足	
2017; 52nd Golden Bell Awards	Allison Lin	Love By Design	必勝練習生	
2017; 52nd Golden Bell Awards	Samantha Ko	Love of Sandstorm	植劇場－戀愛沙塵暴	
2017; 52nd Golden Bell Awards	Rainie Yang	Life Plan A and B	植劇場－荼蘼	
2017; 52nd Golden Bell Awards	Yang Kuei-mei	Life List	遺憾拼圖	
2018; 53rd Golden Bell Awards
2018; 53rd Golden Bell Awards	Summer Meng	Wake Up 2	麻醉風暴2	
2018; 53rd Golden Bell Awards	Sun Ke-fang	What She Put on the Table	植劇場-五味八珍的歲月	
2018; 53rd Golden Bell Awards	Huang Peijia	Roseki	客家劇場–台北歌手	
2018; 53rd Golden Bell Awards	Vera Yen	A Boy Named Flora A	植劇場-花甲男孩轉大人	
2018; 53rd Golden Bell Awards	Yen Yi-wen	We Are All Family	我綿一家人	
2019; 54th Golden Bell Awards
2019; 54th Golden Bell Awards	Cammy Chiang	Utopia For The 20s	20之後	
2019; 54th Golden Bell Awards	Herb Hsu	A Taste to Remember	菜頭梗的滋味	
2019; 54th Golden Bell Awards	Peggy Tseng	A Taiwanese Tale of Two Cities	雙城故事	
2019; 54th Golden Bell Awards	Alyssa Chia	The World Between Us	我們與惡的距離	
2019; 54th Golden Bell Awards	Janel Tsai	Crime Scene Investigation Center 2	鑑識英雄II 正義之戰	

=== 2020s ===
Year	Actress	English title	Original title	Ref
2020; 55th Golden Bell Awards	Tien Hsin	Best Interest	最佳利益	
2020; 55th Golden Bell Awards	Grace Lin	Coolie	苦力	
2020; 55th Golden Bell Awards	Ko Chia-yen	Someday Or One Day	想見你	
2020; 55th Golden Bell Awards	Christina Mok	Yong-Jiu Grocery Store	用九柑仔店	
2020; 55th Golden Bell Awards	Cheryl Yang	The Mirror	鏡子森林	
2021; 56th Golden Bell Awards	Tsai Jia-yin	Girls Win	客家寻味剧场: 女孩上场	
2021; 56th Golden Bell Awards	Sun Shu-may	The Magician on the Skywalk	天桥上的魔术师	
2021; 56th Golden Bell Awards	Chung Hsin-ling	U Motherbaker	我的婆婆怎么那么可爱	
2021; 56th Golden Bell Awards	Vivi Lee	LUO QUE	罗雀高飞	
2021; 56th Golden Bell Awards	Sun Ke-fang	I, Myself	若是一个人	
2022; 57th Golden Bell Awards	Ruby Lin	Light the Night	华灯初上	
2022; 57th Golden Bell Awards	Cheryl Yang	Light the Night	华灯初上	
2022; 57th Golden Bell Awards	Ricie Fun	Island Nation 2	国际桥牌社2	
2022; 57th Golden Bell Awards	Hsieh Ying-xuan	Heaven on the 4th Floor	四楼的天堂	
2022; 57th Golden Bell Awards	Hsieh Ying-xuan	The Making of an Ordinary Woman 2	俗女养成记2	
2023; 58th Golden Bell Awards	Amber An	Oxcart Trails	牛車來去	
2023; 58th Golden Bell Awards	Allison Lin	Taiwan Crime Stories - Derailment	台灣犯罪故事-出軌	
2023; 58th Golden Bell Awards	Gwei Lun-mei	Women in Taipei	台北女子圖鑑	
2023; 58th Golden Bell Awards	Francesca Kao	The Amazing Grace of Σ	我願意	
2023; 58th Golden Bell Awards	Janel Tsai	Mad Doctor	村裡來了個暴走女外科	
2024; 59th Golden Bell Awards	Yosing Fun	Way Back Home	早點回家	
2024; 59th Golden Bell Awards	Puff Kuo	At The Moment	此時此刻	
2024; 59th Golden Bell Awards	Yang Kuei-mei	Living	有生之年	
2024; 59th Golden Bell Awards	Yang Li-yin	A Wonderful Journey	華麗計程車行	
2024; 59th Golden Bell Awards	Alyssa Chia	At The Moment	此時此刻	
2025; 60th Golden Bell Awards	Suri Lin	Born for the Spotlight	影后	
2025; 60th Golden Bell Awards	Alice Ko	I Am Married... But!	童話故事下集	
2025; 60th Golden Bell Awards	Janine Chang	The Outlaw Doctor	化外之醫	
2025; 60th Golden Bell Awards	Pets Tseng	M Mission	太太太厲害	
2025; 60th Golden Bell Awards	Cheryl Yang	Born for the Spotlight	影后	
2025; 60th Golden Bell Awards	Hsieh Ying-xuan	Born for the Spotlight	影后	
2026; 61st Golden Bell Awards	Ivy Shao	The Zoo	動物園	
2026; 61st Golden Bell Awards	Alice Ko	Had I Not Seen The Sun	如果我不曾見過太陽	
2026; 61st Golden Bell Awards	Yang Kuei-mei	The World Between Us: After The Flames	我們與惡的距離II	
2026; 61st Golden Bell Awards	Nikki Hsieh	The World Between Us: After The Flames	我們與惡的距離II	
2026; 61st Golden Bell Awards	Chung Hsin-ling	Holi-Day	拜六禮拜	

== Superlatives ==
Superlative	Actress	Record	Note
Actresses with most awards	Gua Ah-leh; Samantha Ko; Ariel Lin; Alice Ko	2	5 nominations 5 nominations 2 nominations 2 nominations
Actress with most nominations	Leanne Liu	7	1 win
Actress with most nominations without wins	Cheryl Yang	4	No wins
Actress with longest time between wins	Samantha Ko	14 years	In 38th and 52nd Golden Bell Awards
Actresses with shortest time between wins	Ariel Lin; Alice Ko	4 years	43rd, 47th 51st, 55th respectively
Youngest recipient	Emi Lee	Age 25 years	In 25th Golden Bell Awards
Oldest recipient	Gua Ah-leh	Age 53 years	In 32nd Golden Bell Awards
Non-Taiwanese National Recipients	Josephine Siao; Gua Ah-leh	Hong Kong	In 16th Golden Bell Awards; In 27th Golden Bell Awards

=== Award recipients ===
Actress	Wins	Nominations
Yang Kuei-mei	3	5
Gua Ah-leh	2	5
Samantha Ko	2	5
Ariel Lin	2	2
Alice Ko	2	2
Leanne Liu	1	7
Ma Chi-chin	1	3
Rainie Yang	1	3
Tien Hsin	1	3
Julie Lee	1	2
Lai Fung-li	1	2
Wang Mei-Hsueh	1	2
Yang Li-yin	1	2
Francesca Kao	1	2
Pei-jia Huang	1	2
Ming Liu	1	1
Josephine Siao	1	1
Chang Hsiao-yen	1	1
Wu Ching-hsien	1	1
Fang Fang	1	1
Ya-chun Tseng	1	1
Rosanna Ku	1	1
Emi Lee	1	1
Ai Hsiao	1	1
Rene Liu	1	1
Tang Mei-yun	1	1
Lily Tien	1	1
Wanfang	1	1
Chuan Wang	1	1
Vickey Liu	1	1
Miao Ke-li	1	1
Chung Hsin-ling	1	1
Zhu Zhi-Ying	1	1
Alyssa Chia	1	1

=== Award Nominees Without Wins ===
Actress	Wins	Nominations
Cheryl Yang	0	4
Angela Pan	0	3
Lee Chien-na	0	2
Hsi Man-ning	0	2
Chen Meifeng	0	2
Augustine Yeh	0	2
Su Tsui-yu	0	2
Chang Mei-yao	0	2
Hsieh Chiung-hsuan	0	2
Angela Chang	0	2
Gail Lin	0	2
Huang Tsai-yi	0	2
Yen Yi-wen	0	2
Lee Kang-I	0	2
Janel Tsai	0	2
Queenie Fang	0	1
Chen Li-li	0	1
Sally Chen	0	1
Yu Shan	0	1
Lee Tang-Ing	0	1
Hu Chin	0	1
Chen Chiu-yen	0	1
Chen Shu-li	0	1
Li Hui-jui	0	1
Koon Jing-wah	0	1
Shia Lin-Lin	0	1
Crystal Chang	0	1
Kao Chin Su-mei	0	1
Chang Chin	0	1
Cecilia Yip	0	1
Yue Ling	0	1
Pai Bing-bing	0	1
Grace Chen	0	1
Nana Tang	0	1
Josie Leung	0	1
Fang Wen-Lin	0	1
Barbie Hsu	0	1
Pan Yi Jun	0	1
Hsiu-Min Chiu	0	1
Ruyun He	0	1
Ray Rui-Jun Fan	0	1
Shen Shi Hua	0	1
Ming-Chen Chen	0	1
Tsai Chia-hung	0	1
Shu-shen Hsiao	0	1
Chia-ying Lee	0	1
Ella Chen	0	1
Joe Chen	0	1
Kelly Ko	0	1
Tammy Chen	0	1
Fu Xiao Yun	0	1
Bianca Bai	0	1
Amber Kuo	0	1
Jian Man-shu	0	1
Sonia Sui	0	1
Sara Yu	0	1
Ginger Chen	0	1
Megan Lai	0	1
June Tsai	0	1
Ting Yeh-tien	0	1
Jade Chou	0	1
Zaizai Lin	0	1
Nikki Hsin-Ying Hsieh	0	1
Sandrine Pinna	0	1
Ruby Lin	0	2
Yang Ko-han	0	1
Cindy Lien	0	1
Allison Lin	0	1
Summer Meng	0	1
Sun Ke-fang	0	1
Vera Yen	0	1
Cammy Chiang	0	1
Herb Hsu	0	1
Peggy Tseng	0	1
Lin Wen Yi	0	1
Christina Mok	0	1
