= Golden Bell Award for Best Variety Show =

Taiwanese television award

- Awarded for: Best Variety Show
- Location: Taiwan
- Presented by: Bureau of Audiovisual and Music Industry Development
- First award: 1980
- Currently held by: Best Variety Show (2023)
- Website: gba.tavis.tw

The Golden Bell Award for Best Variety Show (Chinese: 電視金鐘獎綜藝節目獎) is one of the categories of the competition for the Taiwanese television production, Golden Bell Awards. It is presented annually in October by the Government Information Office, Taiwan. The first time that the television programs were first eligible to be awarded was in 1971.

== Winners and nominees ==
TV Series program winners from 1971 to 1980 were not included in the list. For more information, see also: Golden Bell Awards list of winners

=== 1980s ===
Year	Program	Channel	Ref
1981; 16th Golden Bell Awards
1981; 16th Golden Bell Awards	Happy Marriage	TTV	
1982; 17th Golden Bell Awards
1982; 17th Golden Bell Awards	Variety 100 (綜藝一百)	CTS	
1983; 18th Golden Bell Awards
1983; 18th Golden Bell Awards	Wind Singing	CTS	
1984; 19th Golden Bell Awards
1984; 19th Golden Bell Awards	Variety 100 (綜藝一百)	CTS	
1985; 20th Golden Bell Awards
1985; 20th Golden Bell Awards	Weekend Eight	CTV	
1986; 21st Golden Bell Awards
1986; 21st Golden Bell Awards	Saturday School	CTS	
1987; 22nd Golden Bell Awards
1987; 22nd Golden Bell Awards	CTV Theater - Another Voice	CTV	
1988; 23rd Golden Bell Awards
1988; 23rd Golden Bell Awards	Flying Notes 飛揚的音符	CTV	
1989; 24th Golden Bell Awards
1989; 24th Golden Bell Awards	Quaver	TTV	

=== 1990s ===
Year	Program	Channel	Ref
1990; 25th Golden Bell Awards
1990; 25th Golden Bell Awards	Woman, Woman 女人女人 (電視節目)	CTV	
1991; 26th Golden Bell Awards
1991; 26th Golden Bell Awards	Serial Bubble	CTV	
1992; 27th Golden Bell Awards
1992; 27th Golden Bell Awards	Woman, Woman 女人女人 (電視節目)	CTV	
1993; 28th Golden Bell Awards
1993; 28th Golden Bell Awards	The Kingdom Thousand Miles 江山萬里情	CTS	
1994; 29th Golden Bell Awards
1994; 29th Golden Bell Awards	n/a (Note: During this time, Television and Radio broadcasting were awarded alternatively. This year, it was Radio Broadcasting."Archived copy". Archived from the original on 2014-10-18..)		
1995; 30th Golden Bell Awards
1995; 30th Golden Bell Awards	The Winner 天生贏家	CTV	
1996; 31st Golden Bell Awards
1996; 31st Golden Bell Awards	n/a		
1997; 32nd Golden Bell Awards
1997; 32nd Golden Bell Awards	Super Sunday	CTV	
1998; 33rd Golden Bell Awards
1998; 33rd Golden Bell Awards	n/a		
1999; 34th Golden Bell Awards
1999; 34th Golden Bell Awards	Super Sunday	CTV	

=== 2000s ===
Year	Program	Channel	Ref
2000; 35th Golden Bell Awards
2000; 35th Golden Bell Awards	Super Sunday	CTS	
2001; 36th Golden Bell Awards
2001; 36th Golden Bell Awards	Taiwan Red Star	TTV	
2002; 37th Golden Bell Awards
2002; 37th Golden Bell Awards	The World Is Very Wonderful	CTV	
2003; 38th Golden Bell Awards
2003; 38th Golden Bell Awards	Inter-Generational Power Company	United Yee Production Co. Ltd.	
2004; 39th Golden Bell Awards
2004; 39th Golden Bell Awards	Variety Large Collection	Communications Ltd	
2005; 40th Golden Bell Awards
2005; 40th Golden Bell Awards	全民大悶鍋	CTI	
2006; 41st Golden Bell Awards
2006; 41st Golden Bell Awards	Variety Big Brother	CTV	
2007; 42nd Golden Bell Awards	Best Community Variety Programme; The China Exiperence (中國大體驗)	Eastern Broadcasting Corporation	
2007; 42nd Golden Bell Awards	The Close Up (大特寫)		
2007; 42nd Golden Bell Awards	Stories in Taiwan (在台灣的故事)		
2007; 42nd Golden Bell Awards	Love Garden (愛上陶花園)		
2007; 42nd Golden Bell Awards	Love Taiwan (瘋台灣)		
2007; 42nd Golden Bell Awards	Best Entertainment Variety Programme (娛樂綜藝節目獎); One Million Star (超級星光大道)	CTV	
2007; 42nd Golden Bell Awards	Blackie's Teenage Club (我愛黑澀會)		
2007; 42nd Golden Bell Awards	8pm Sunday (週日八點黨)		
2007; 42nd Golden Bell Awards	Everybody Speaks Nonsenses II – Hot Pot (全民大悶鍋)		
2007; 42nd Golden Bell Awards	Variety Big Brother (綜藝大哥大)		
2007; 42nd Golden Bell Awards	Best Music Variety Programme (娛樂綜藝節目獎); Spring in Taiwan (台灣望春風)	GTV	
2007; 42nd Golden Bell Awards	Hakka Good Music (客家好音樂)		
2007; 42nd Golden Bell Awards	Golden Night Club (黃金夜總會)		
2007; 42nd Golden Bell Awards	Hot Sunday (週日狂熱夜)		
2007; 42nd Golden Bell Awards	Happy Go Happy Listening (樂來樂動聽)		
2008; 43rd Golden Bell Awards	Best Entertainment Variety Programme (娛樂綜藝節目獎); Variety Big Winner (綜藝大贏家)	FTV	
2008; 43rd Golden Bell Awards	People's Party (全民最大黨)		
2008; 43rd Golden Bell Awards	Guess (我猜我猜我猜猜猜)		
2008; 43rd Golden Bell Awards	Harlem's School (哈林國民學校)		
2008; 43rd Golden Bell Awards	One Million Star (超級星光大道)		
2008; 43rd Golden Bell Awards	Best Music Variety Programme (娛樂綜藝節目獎); Spring in Taiwan (台灣望春風)	GTV	
2008; 43rd Golden Bell Awards	Hot Sunday (週日狂熱夜)		
2008; 43rd Golden Bell Awards	Supper Dance (超級原舞曲)		
2008; 43rd Golden Bell Awards	Super Idol (超級偶像)		
2009; 44th Golden Bell Awards	Guess (我猜我猜我猜猜猜)		
2009; 44th Golden Bell Awards	Contest 101 (挑戰101)		
2009; 44th Golden Bell Awards	One Million Star (超級星光大道)		
2009; 44th Golden Bell Awards	People's Party	CTI	
2009; 44th Golden Bell Awards	Dance Avenue (舞林大道)		

=== 2010s ===
Year	Program	Channel	Ref
2010; 45th Golden Bell Awards	All Pass (百萬小學堂)	TTV	
2010; 45th Golden Bell Awards	People's Party (全民最大黨)		
2010; 45th Golden Bell Awards	One Million Star (超級星光大道)		
2010; 45th Golden Bell Awards	Super Idol (超級偶像)		
2010; 45th Golden Bell Awards	Diamond Night Club (鑽石夜總會)		
2011; 46th Golden Bell Awards	Big Party	CTi Variety	
2011; 46th Golden Bell Awards	Million Primary School	TTV	
2011; 46th Golden Bell Awards	Super Taste	TVBS	
2011; 46th Golden Bell Awards	Tao’s Show	CTV	
2011; 46th Golden Bell Awards	Variety Big Brother	CTV	
2012; 47th Golden Bell Awards
2012; 47th Golden Bell Awards	超級模王大道	CTV	
