= Golden Bell Award for Best Miniseries or Television Film =

Taiwanese television award

- Awarded for: Best Miniseries or Television Film of the Year
- Location: Taiwan
- Presented by: Golden Bell Awards
- Currently held by: Best Miniseries: Wave Makers (2023) Best Television Film: The Mimicry (2023)

The Golden Bell Award for Best Miniseries or Television Film (Chinese: 電視金鐘獎迷你劇集/電視電影獎) is presented annually by the Government Information Office, Taiwan. The first time that the television programs were first eligible to be awarded was in 1971. In 2017, the category was split into two separate categories, Best Miniseries, and Best Television Film with a winner selected from each category.

== Winners and nominees ==
TV Series program winners from 1971 to 1982 were not included in the list. For more information, see also: Golden Bell Awards list of winners

=== 1980s ===
Year	English title	Original title	Ref
1983; 18th Golden Bell Awards
1983; 18th Golden Bell Awards	Normalized love		
1984; 19th Golden Bell Awards
1984; 19th Golden Bell Awards	Gold Theatre		
1985; 20th Golden Bell Awards
1985; 20th Golden Bell Awards	China, as the theater Shadow		
1986; 21st Golden Bell Awards
1986; 21st Golden Bell Awards	Acme Theater - Moon spring		
1987; 22nd Golden Bell Awards
1987; 22nd Golden Bell Awards	Creative Theatre - Yangtze situation		
1988; 23rd Golden Bell Awards
1988; 23rd Golden Bell Awards		華視劇場－陽光每天都來過	
1989; 24th Golden Bell Awards
1989; 24th Golden Bell Awards	Taiwan Television Playhouse (money-burning)		

=== 1990s ===
Year	English title	Original title	Ref
1990; 25th Golden Bell Awards
1990; 25th Golden Bell Awards	cuckoo sound reminder		
1991; 26th Golden Bell Awards
1991; 26th Golden Bell Awards	Jia Jiafu	都是貪吃惹的禍	
1992; 27th Golden Bell Awards
1992; 27th Golden Bell Awards	Love Story bedside - absurd Love		
1993; 28th Golden Bell Awards
1993; 28th Golden Bell Awards	classic theater - a home like ours		
1994; 29th Golden Bell Awards
1994; 29th Golden Bell Awards	n/a (Note: During this time, Television and Radio broadcasting were awarded alternatively. This year, it was Radio Broadcasting."Archived copy". Archived from the original on 18 October 2014..)		
1995; 30th Golden Bell Awards
1995; 30th Golden Bell Awards	Comrade Xiaoping		
1996; 31st Golden Bell Awards
1996; 31st Golden Bell Awards	n/a		
1997; 32nd Golden Bell Awards
1997; 32nd Golden Bell Awards	Gold Drama Exhibition - Juvenile Death Confessions		
1998; 33rd Golden Bell Awards
1998; 33rd Golden Bell Awards	n/a		
1999; 34th Golden Bell Awards
1999; 34th Golden Bell Awards	Chinese television drama exhibition - exodus		

=== 2000s ===
Year	English title	Original title	Ref
2000; 35th Golden Bell Awards
2000; 35th Golden Bell Awards		誰在橋上寫字	
2001; 36th Golden Bell Awards
2001; 36th Golden Bell Awards	Treasonous Woman	逆女	
2002; 37th Golden Bell Awards
2002; 37th Golden Bell Awards	Illegal Paradise		
2003; 38th Golden Bell Awards
2003; 38th Golden Bell Awards	Life Drama Exhibition: Forced Breathing		
2004; 39th Golden Bell Awards
2004; 39th Golden Bell Awards	Dinner		
2005; 40th Golden Bell Awards
2005; 40th Golden Bell Awards		我的臭小孩	
2006; 41st Golden Bell Awards
2006; 41st Golden Bell Awards	Moth Body	肉身蛾	
2007; 42nd Golden Bell Awards
2007; 42nd Golden Bell Awards	PTS Life Story: Nyonya Taste	公視人生劇展：娘惹滋味	
2008; 43rd Golden Bell Awards
2008; 43rd Golden Bell Awards	PTS Life Story: Imprints of Ceiba Flowers	公視人生劇展－木棉的印記	
2008; 43rd Golden Bell Awards	PTS Life Story: Do Not Love Etudes	公視人生劇展－不愛練習曲	
2008; 43rd Golden Bell Awards	PTS Life Story: Long Vacation	公視人生劇展：長假	
2008; 43rd Golden Bell Awards	I Won't Cry	生命關懷系列－說好不准哭	
2008; 43rd Golden Bell Awards	DaAi Drama: Xun Fu Ji	大愛劇場－馴富記	
2009; 44th Golden Bell Awards
2009; 44th Golden Bell Awards	PTS Life Story: After 30 Seconds	公視人生劇展－三十秒過後	
2009; 44th Golden Bell Awards	PTS Life Story: The Life Book	公視人生劇展－生命紀念冊	
2009; 44th Golden Bell Awards	PTS Life Story: My Spaceman Grandma	公視人生劇展－我的阿嬤是太空人	
2009; 44th Golden Bell Awards	PTS Life Story: Shei Lai Zuo Da Wei	公視人生劇展－誰來坐大位	
2009; 44th Golden Bell Awards	Taipei 24H	台北異想	

=== 2010s ===
Year	English title	Original title	Ref
2010; 45th Golden Bell Awards
2010; 45th Golden Bell Awards	PTS Life Story: Gangster Daddy	公視人生劇展－我的爸爸是流氓	
2010; 45th Golden Bell Awards	Hakka TV Movie: The Sea People	客家電視電影院－討海人	
2010; 45th Golden Bell Awards	PTS Life Story: The Taste of Papaya	公視人生劇展－秋宜的婚事	
2010; 45th Golden Bell Awards	PTS Life Story: Ghost Hunting	公視人生劇展－尋鬼記	
2010; 45th Golden Bell Awards	Smile	看見天堂	
2011; 46th Golden Bell Awards
2011; 46th Golden Bell Awards	Days We Stared at the Sun	他們在畢業的前一天爆炸	
2011; 46th Golden Bell Awards	The Lost Sea Horizon	失落的海平線	
2011; 46th Golden Bell Awards	Revenge of the Factory Woman	與愛別離	
2011; 46th Golden Bell Awards	Hakka TV Movie: Free Ride	客家電視電影院－免費搭乘	
2011; 46th Golden Bell Awards	The Crying Bamboo Forest	原視生命劇展－飄搖的竹林	
2012; 47th Golden Bell Awards
2012; 47th Golden Bell Awards	PTS Life Story: Finding Anthony	公視人生劇展－公主與王子	
2012; 47th Golden Bell Awards	PTS Life Story: Thief	公視人生劇展－小偷	
2012; 47th Golden Bell Awards	PTS Life Story: No Way Home	公視人生劇展－離家的女人	
2012; 47th Golden Bell Awards	Sui Yue De Ji Shi	歲月的籤詩	
2012; 47th Golden Bell Awards	Debbie's Happy Life	黛比的幸福生活	
2013; 48th Golden Bell Awards
2013; 48th Golden Bell Awards	PTS Life Story: One Summer Night	公視人生劇展－仲夏夜府城	
2013; 48th Golden Bell Awards	Traversal 101	穿越101	
2013; 48th Golden Bell Awards	PTS Life Story: The 31st Kau Cim	公視人生劇展－第三十一首籤	
2013; 48th Golden Bell Awards	PTS Life Story: Substitute For Love	公視人生劇展－愛情替聲	
2013; 48th Golden Bell Awards	PTS Life Story: The Will to Power	公視人生劇展－權力過程	
2014; 49th Golden Bell Awards
2014; 49th Golden Bell Awards	PTS Life Story: My Old Boy	公視人生劇展－只想比你多活一天	
2014; 49th Golden Bell Awards	PTS Innovative Story: The Free Man	公視學生劇展－自由人	
2014; 49th Golden Bell Awards	PTS Life Story: Almost Heaven	公視人生劇展－回家的女人	
2014; 49th Golden Bell Awards	PTS Life Story: Thanks for Your Patronage	公視人生劇展－銘謝惠顧	
2014; 49th Golden Bell Awards	Dawn / Spring	曉之春	
2015; 50th Golden Bell Awards
2015; 50th Golden Bell Awards	PTS Life Story: The Kids	公視人生劇展－小孩	
2015; 50th Golden Bell Awards	PTS Life Story: Angel's Voice Recorder	公視人生劇展－天使的收音機	
2015; 50th Golden Bell Awards	PTS Life Story: The Road Home	公視人生劇展－回家路上	
2015; 50th Golden Bell Awards	PTS Life Story: Let the Sunshine In	公視人生劇展－浪子單飛	
2015; 50th Golden Bell Awards	Wake Up	麻醉風暴	
2016; 51st Golden Bell Awards
2016; 51st Golden Bell Awards	The Island That All Flow By	川流之島	
2016; 51st Golden Bell Awards	Lost Daughter	再見女兒	
2016; 51st Golden Bell Awards	The Cat in the Closet	衣櫃裡的貓	
2016; 51st Golden Bell Awards	Coin Boy	銅板少年	
2016; 51st Golden Bell Awards	The Black Box	黑盒子	
2017; 52nd Golden Bell Awards	Best Mini-Series		
2017; 52nd Golden Bell Awards	Far and Away - Dark Beauty	外鄉女-黑美人	
2017; 52nd Golden Bell Awards	The Teenage Psychic	通靈少女	
2017; 52nd Golden Bell Awards	The Devil Game	劣人傳之詭計	
2017; 52nd Golden Bell Awards	She's Family	媽媽不見了	
2017; 52nd Golden Bell Awards	Best Television Film		
2017; 52nd Golden Bell Awards	Their Heaven	TMD天堂	
2017; 52nd Golden Bell Awards	PTS Life Story: The Long Goodbye	公視人生劇展－告別	
2017; 52nd Golden Bell Awards	Keep Going	公視迷你電影院－一直騎呀一直騎	
2017; 52nd Golden Bell Awards	We Are One	望月	
2017; 52nd Golden Bell Awards	Upstream	濁流	
2018; 53rd Golden Bell Awards	Best Mini-Series		
2018; 53rd Golden Bell Awards	HIStory2: Crossing the Line	HIStory2 - 越界	
2018; 53rd Golden Bell Awards	Days We Stared at the Sun II	他們在畢業的前一天爆炸2	
2018; 53rd Golden Bell Awards	Far and Away: Lover's Choices	外鄉女-愛人的選擇	
2018; 53rd Golden Bell Awards	Ghost High School	恐怖高校劇場之直播中二間	
2018; 53rd Golden Bell Awards	Best Television Film		
2018; 53rd Golden Bell Awards	Where the Sun Don't Shine	公視人生劇展-青苔	
2018; 53rd Golden Bell Awards	Ping Pong	公視新創電影-乒乓	
2018; 53rd Golden Bell Awards	Lovely Sundays	公視學生劇展第一廣場	
2018; 53rd Golden Bell Awards	A-Tsuí & Kok-Siông	阿水和國祥	
2018; 53rd Golden Bell Awards	Mermaid Whispering	海•人•魚	
2019; 54th Golden Bell Awards	Best Mini-Series		
2019; 54th Golden Bell Awards	The Mouse Serves a Guest Tea	老鼠捧茶請人客	
2019; 54th Golden Bell Awards	The Coming Through	奇蹟的女兒	
2019; 54th Golden Bell Awards	Green Door	魂囚西門	
2019; 54th Golden Bell Awards	Bodhisattva in Storm	憤怒的菩薩	
2019; 54th Golden Bell Awards	Best Television Film		
2019; 54th Golden Bell Awards	PTS Life Story: The Roar	公視人生劇展－第一響槍	
2019; 54th Golden Bell Awards	PTS Original Shorts: A Taxi Driver	公視新創短片－暴好人	
2019; 54th Golden Bell Awards	On Children: Child of the Cat	你的孩子不是你的孩子-貓的孩子	
2019; 54th Golden Bell Awards	Wild Sparrow	野雀之詩	
2019; 54th Golden Bell Awards	A Cold Summer Day	華視精選劇場－夏之橘	

=== 2020s ===
Year	English title	Original title	Ref
2020; 55th Golden Bell Awards	Best Mini-Series		
2020; 55th Golden Bell Awards	The Making of An Ordinary Woman	俗女養成記	
2020; 55th Golden Bell Awards	Nowhere Man	罪夢者	
2020; 55th Golden Bell Awards	Candy Online	糖糖Online	
2020; 55th Golden Bell Awards	Best Television Film		
2020; 55th Golden Bell Awards	PTS Life Story: Viatical Settlement	公視人生劇展— 殘值	
2020; 55th Golden Bell Awards	PTS Mini 4U: Wildflower	公視迷你電影院 — 釘子花	
2020; 55th Golden Bell Awards	Til Death Do Us Part: No Pets Allowed	住戶公約第一條	
2020; 55th Golden Bell Awards	Dear Orange	客家電視電影院 — 大桔大利 闔家平安	
2020; 55th Golden Bell Awards	PTS Original Shorts: Lucky Draw	新創電影短片 — 大吉	
2021; 56th Golden Bell Awards	Best Mini-Series		
2021; 56th Golden Bell Awards	Workers	做工的人	
2021; 56th Golden Bell Awards	Who Killed the Good Man	大債時代	
2021; 56th Golden Bell Awards	Adventure of the Ring	戒指流浪記	
2021; 56th Golden Bell Awards	Detention	返校	
2021; 56th Golden Bell Awards	Futmalls	預支未來	
2021; 56th Golden Bell Awards	Best Television Film		
2021; 56th Golden Bell Awards	The Cleaner	人生清理員	
2021; 56th Golden Bell Awards	The Child of Light	光的孩子	
2021; 56th Golden Bell Awards	The Era Where I Live	窩卡	
2021; 56th Golden Bell Awards	Humming Memory	蟾鳴	
2021; 56th Golden Bell Awards	See You, Sir	主管再見	
2022; 57th Golden Bell Awards	Best Mini-Series		
2022; 57th Golden Bell Awards	2049		
2022; 57th Golden Bell Awards	The Pond	池塘怪談	
2022; 57th Golden Bell Awards	More Than Blue: The Series	比悲傷更悲傷的故事：影集版	
2022; 57th Golden Bell Awards	Twisted Strings	良辰吉時	
2022; 57th Golden Bell Awards	Fragrance of the First Flower	第一次遇見花香的那刻	
2022; 57th Golden Bell Awards	Best Television Film		
2022; 57th Golden Bell Awards	Butterflies	公視新創短片- 蝴蝶	
2022; 57th Golden Bell Awards	Do Not Go Gentle in Taipei	台北過手無暝無日	
2022; 57th Golden Bell Awards	Steps of Youth	青春劇烈物語	
2022; 57th Golden Bell Awards	Undercurrent	降河洄游	
2022; 57th Golden Bell Awards	Solo Trekker	獨攀者	
2023; 58th Golden Bell Awards	Best Mini-Series		
2023; 58th Golden Bell Awards	Wave Makers	人選之人—造浪者	
2023; 58th Golden Bell Awards	Shards of Her	她和她的她	
2023; 58th Golden Bell Awards	Hoping	和平歸來	
2023; 58th Golden Bell Awards	The Leaking Bookstore	茁劇場-滴水的推理書屋	
2023; 58th Golden Bell Awards	Best Television Film		
2023; 58th Golden Bell Awards	Far Away Eyes	幻日手記	
2023; 58th Golden Bell Awards	On Marriage: Mary's Merry Marriage	你的婚姻不是你的婚姻：梅莉	
2023; 58th Golden Bell Awards	My Sister	姊姊	
2023; 58th Golden Bell Awards	The Mimicry	客家電影院-綠金龜的模仿犯	
2023; 58th Golden Bell Awards	Revolting with Dragon	龔囝	
