= 19th Golden Bell Awards =

1984 Taiwanese radio and television programming awards

- Date: 18 March 1984 (radio and television)
- Site: Sun Yat-sen Memorial Hall, Taipei, Taiwan
- Organized by: Government Information Office, Executive Yuan

Television coverage
- Network: Taiwan Television (TTV)

The 19th Golden Bell Awards (Chinese: 第19屆金鐘獎) was held on 18 March 1984 at the Sun Yat-sen Memorial Hall in Taipei, Taiwan. The ceremony was broadcast by Taiwan Television (TTV).

== Winners ==
Program/Award	Winner	Network
Individual Awards
Radio Broadcasting
News presenters	Mei-Fong Wu - "News Feature"	Police Broadcasting Service - Kaohsiung
Educational and Cultural Programs Moderator	Zhang Fengkang - "National Opera appreciation"	Broadcasting Corporation of China
Children's show host	Shen Wan - "Star Nocturne (Starship strolling)"	Broadcasting Corporation of China
Music and Variety Show Host	Zhang Jialian - "Concert Hall"	Revival Radio
Best Director	Wang Ying - "National Opera World"	Kaohsiung City government radio
Best Writer	Xu Song - "classroom without walls"	Cheng Sheng Broadcasting Corporation - Miaoli Taiwan
Best Interview	Feng Xiaolong - "1983 Taiwan Area Games Special Report"	Broadcasting Corporation of China
Best Narrator	藍正祥 - "News Feature"	Police Broadcasting Service - Kaohsiung
Television Broadcasting
News presenter	KARL Tan, Chen Yueqing - "Chinese television news magazine"	CTS
Educational and cultural programs Moderator	Chen Yueqing - "neighbors"	CTS
VJ	Tian Wenzhong, Shen Chunhua - "I love Matchmaker"	TTV
Children's show host	Shen Chunhua - "Happy Little Angel"	TTV
Best Actor	Chang Feng - "Chinese TV drama show (兩種結尾)	CTS
Best Actress	Wu Ching-hsien - "Star Knows My Heart"	TTV
Best Male Singer	Fei Yu-ching	CTV
Best Female Singer	Shiao Lih-ju	CTV
Most Promising New Drama Actor	Chao Yung-hsin	CTS
Best Producer	蔣子安 - "少年十五二十時"	CTV
Best Director	Lin Fu-ti、葉超 - "Star Knows My Heart"	TTV
Best Screenplay	Xiao Zhong - "Star Knows My Heart"	TTV
Best Interview	Li Tao, Liu Qiwei - "Mentality of the CCP students reported"	CTS
Best Audio	Lin Cheng Hung - "Intrigue"	CTS
Best Cinematography	Ding Wenlong - "big playground"	CTV
Best Lighting	Chenhui Xiong, Liu Guorong - "You come"	CTV
Best Photo	Liu Qiwei Huang Guo-zhi - "Chinese television news magazine"	CTS
Best Art Director	HARBOR - "Intrigue"	CTS
Best Academic awards	Hongping Feng - "television career management Introduction"	CTS
Best Engineering Award	Lin Ruizheng, 吳柏林 - "遙控微波倒送轉換設備之研製"	CTV
Programme Awards
Radio Broadcasting
News program	"Picking Ballad"	Broadcasting Corporation of China - 高雄台
Educational and cultural programs	art world	army Taipei Taiwan
Children's program	Star Bridge	Police Broadcasting Service - Kaohsiung
Drama programs	Taiwan wide theater	Taiwan Broadcasting Corporation
Variety show	"Han loud voice"	Taiwan Taichung Taiwan wide
Music program	Music Hall	Revival Radio
Television Broadcasting
News program	Chinese television news magazine	CTS
Educational and cultural programs	Earth Song	TTV
Children's Program	Little News	CTV
Variety show	Variety one hundred	CTS
Best Movie	Gold Theatre	CTV
Best TV series	Star Knows My Heart	TTV
Traditional opera repertoire	Ghostbuster	CTS
Advertising Awards
Best Radio advertisement	everyone singing	天南電台
Best Television commercial	Prynne public ad campaign	黑潮電視電影企業公司
