= 15th Golden Bell Awards =

1980 Taiwanese radio and television programming awards

- Date: 26 March 1980 (radio and television)
- Site: Sun Yat-sen Memorial Hall, Taipei, Taiwan
- Organized by: Government Information Office, Executive Yuan

Television coverage
- Network: Chinese Television System (CTS)

The 15th Golden Bell Awards (Chinese: 第15屆金鐘獎) was held on 26 March 1980 at the Sun Yat-sen Memorial Hall in Taipei, Taiwan. The ceremony was broadcast by Chinese Television System (CTS).

== Winners ==
| Program/Award | Winner | Network |
Programme Awards
Radio Broadcasting
| News and Current Affairs Commentary Programs | Victory Gate | Air Force Radio |
| Education and Cultural Programs | City of Culture | Broadcasting Corporation of China - 台灣台 |
| Public Service Programs | I serve you | Taipei Municipal Radio |
| Popular Entertainment Programs | Concert Hall | Revival Radio |
| Subject-Oriented program | Air poster | Guanghua Radio |
Television Broadcasting
| News and Current Affairs Commentary Programs | 新聞報導－反鄧匪訪美示威衛星實況轉播 | CTV |
| Education and Cultural Programs | 60 Minutes | CTV |
| Public Service Programs | - | - |
| Popular Entertainment Programs | Variety 100 | CTS |
| Most Creative program | Love | CTV |
Advertising Awards
| Best Radio Advertisement Award: | Kodak Camera | The Sound of Victory |
| Best Television Commercial | BVD underwear | Dada Television Company |
Individual Awards
Radio Broadcasting
| Best Producer Award | Xu Qian - 崑曲介紹－古典新聲 | Broadcasting Corporation of China |
| Best Director Award | Sun Yuzhen - 四健園地－吾愛吾村 | Broadcasting Corporation of China - 台灣台 |
| Best Screenplay Award | Yu Zhaobo - 行的安全旅遊服務，介紹北部濱海公路 | Broadcasting Corporation of China - 宜蘭台 |
| 撰搞獎 | 吳福金 - 縣政報導 | 復興屏東台 |
| 主持獎 | Cheng Hui - 今夜之歌 | Police Broadcasting Service |
| Best Interview Award | 白詩禮 - concentric bridge | Police Broadcasting Service |
| Best Broadcaster Award | 黃訓 - Fuxinggang Commentary | Fuxing Broadcasting Station |
| Best Editor Award | Hugh Lee - Victory Gate | Air Force Station |
Television Broadcasting
| Production Award | Zhai Rui Lek - 名劇精選──明天就是星期天 | CTV |
| Directed Award | 顧訓 - 星光閃閃 | CTS |
| Editing Award | Huang Zhaoyan - Variety 100 | CTS |
| Interview Award | Fu Da-ren - News | TTV |
| News program host award | 熊旅揚 - CTV News | CTV |
| Social education show host award | Li Chi-chun - 東南西北 | CTV |
| Variety of presenters Award | Chang Hsiao-yen - Variety 100 | CTS |
| Best Actor | Yueyang - Heroes | TTV |
| Best Actress | Liu - 名劇精選－李家嫂子 | CTV |
| Comedy Actor Award | 蔣光超 - double happiness | CTS |
| Comedy Actress Award | Xia Lingling - little Rhapsody | TTV |
| Most Promising Newcomer Drama Actor Award | 華方 - 春去幾時回 | CTV |
| Best Male singer | Liu Wen-cheng | CTS |
| Best Female singer | Teresa Teng | TTV |
| Most Promising Newcomer Singer Award | 婁家珍 | TTV |
| Jane Yanqing | Variety 100 | CTS |
| Photo Editing Award | 60 Minutes | CTV |
| Best Cinematography | Ching-jen - Variety 100 | CTS |
| Art Director Award | Blue Wing Yin - Galaxy Starlight | TTV |
