= 17th Golden Bell Awards =

1982 Taiwanese radio and television programming awards

- Date: 13 March 1982 (radio and television)
- Site: Sun Yat-sen Memorial Hall, Taipei, Taiwan
- Organized by: Government Information Office, Executive Yuan

Television coverage
- Network: China Television (CTV)

The 17th Golden Bell Awards (Chinese: 第17屆金鐘獎) was held on 13 March 1982 at the Sun Yat-sen Memorial Hall in Taipei, Taiwan. The ceremony was broadcast by China Television (CTV).

== Winners ==
Program/Award	Winner	Network
Programme Awards
Radio Broadcasting
News program	中華民國七十年台灣區運動大會特別報導	Broadcasting Corporation of China
Educational and cultural programs	Youth Club	正聲
Drama programs	中國歷史人物廣播劇集	Broadcasting Corporation of China
Children's Program	Women's Time	Revival Radio
Variety show	輕歌妙語	正聲
Television Broadcasting
News program	Chinese television news magazine	CTS
Educational and cultural programs	Word of the Day	CTS
Drama program	單元劇-他是我兄弟 連續劇-春望	CTS
Traditional Opera	Opera - Zongbao and Mu Guiying	TTV
Children's program	The kids	CTS
Variety show	Variety 100 (綜藝一百)	CTS
Advertising Awards
Best Radio advertising Award	International brand stereo	
Best Television Advertisement Award	Savlon Shampoo	
Individual Awards
Radio Broadcasting
Best Producer Award	Qin Fen Chang	軍中
Best Director Award	Yinchuan Xing	Broadcasting Corporation of China
Best Writer Award	Liu Ching-hua	PRS Kaohsiung, Taiwan
Best Screenplay Award	Liu Ching-hua	Police Broadcasting Service
Best Moderator Award	Fang Ruiwen	Police Broadcasting Service
Best Interview Award	Liu Siyuan	Broadcasting Corporation of China
Best Broadcaster Award	Chen Min Feng	Cheng Sheng Broadcasting Corporation
Best Audio Award	彭達煙	Broadcasting Corporation of China
Television Broadcasting
Best Producer Award	Zhang Yongxiang - "Spring Hope"	CTS
Best Director Award	Lee Young - "Spring Hope"	CTS
Best Screenplay Award	Zhang Yongxiang, Zhang Wan - "Spring Hope"	CTS
Best Interview Award	Liu Shufen	TTV
Best News presenter Award	Sheng Chu	TTV
Educational and cultural programs Moderator	Kingsley	CTV
Variety show host	Chang Hsiao-yen	CTS
Children's programs Moderator	Liu Ching-min	CTV
Best Broadcast personnel	熊旅揚	CTV
Best Actor Award	Ku Pao-ming	CTS
Best Actress Award	Chang Hsiao-yen	CTS
Best Child actor	于世耕	TTV
Best Male Singer	Liu Wen-cheng	CTS
Best Female Singer	Fong Fei-fei	CTV
Best Lighting	Cheng Zhixiang, Wang Kang	CTS
Best Cinematography	Lin Jin	CTV
Best Cinematography	Chen Lishan	CTS
Best Audio	David Li, Li Zemin	CTV
Best Art Director	Chen Yuan	CTV
Most Promising New Drama Actor	Hugh Lee	CTS
Special Award	徐鉅昌	CTS
Special Award	Zeng Xubai, WU Dao	TTV
