= 22nd Golden Bell Awards =

1987 Taiwanese radio and television programming awards

- Date: 21 March 1987 (radio and television)
- Site: Taipei City Arts Promotion Office, Taipei, Taiwan
- Organized by: Government Information Office, Executive Yuan

Television coverage
- Network: Taiwan Television (TTV)

The 22nd Golden Bell Awards (Chinese: 第22屆金鐘獎) was held on 21 March 1987 at the Taipei City Arts Promotion Office in Taipei, Taiwan. The ceremony was broadcast by Taiwan Television (TTV).

== Winners ==
| Program/Award | Winner | Network |
Programme Awards
Radio Broadcasting
| News program | Air news magazine | Cheng Sheng Broadcasting Corporation - Kaohsiung Taiwan |
| Educational and cultural programs | Cultural Train | Army Radio |
| Children's Program | Little Library | Army Radio |
| Drama programs | Life's brilliant | military radio |
| Music program | Evening Concert | Army Radio |
| Variety show | Rondo | Revival Radio |
Television Broadcasting
| News program | CTS News Magazine | CTS |
| Educational and cultural programs | 花間之歌 | CTV |
| Children's program | As long as I grow up | CTS |
| Variety show | CTV Theater - Another Voice | CTV |
| Drama program | Creative Theatre - Yangtze situation traditional opera "National Opera - Zhao Wu Niang" | CTV; TTV |
| Variety show | golden stave | CTV |
Advertising Awards
| Best Radio Advertising | 把好的聲音收藏起來 | Taipei Taiwan Cheng Sheng Broadcasting Corporation |
| Best Television Commercial | Sakura film - Li Li-chun articles | 萬橋影藝事業有限公司 |
Individual Awards
Radio Broadcasting
| News presenter | 顧君美 - "Week Interview" | Police Broadcasting Service |
| Educational and cultural programs Moderator | Tianqiu Fang - "National Music Collection | Army Radio |
| Children's show host | Cai Shuhui (朱顏) - "小木屋" | Police Broadcasting Service |
| DJ | 呂麗莉 - "beautiful melody" | Police Broadcasting Service |
| VJ | Lin Qianyun (LIN Yun) - "colorful" | China Radio |
| Best Director | 哈碧玉 - "golden age" | Cheng Sheng Broadcasting Corporation - Taiwan and Taiwan |
| Best Broadcaster | Wengjia Mei - "Good Morning Taiwan - Kaohsiung scene" | Cheng Sheng Broadcasting Corporation - Kaohsiung Taiwan |
| Best Writer | Chang Qin Fen - "dew sings" | Broadcasting Corporation of China |
| Best Interview | Luo Ailin (羅琳) - "Boundless" | Revival Radio |
| Best Narrator | 李築新 - "the glory of life" | army radio |
Television Broadcasting
| News presenter | Chen Jingyi - "Good afternoon Hello TTV News" | TTV |
| Educational and cultural programs Moderator | Xionglv Yang - "Flowers Song" | CTV |
| Children's show host | Jennifer Shen - "咕咕感應圈" | TTV |
| VJ | Chow Mei-yee, Ba Ge - "Double Star Annunciation" | CTS |
| Best Director | Wangzhong Jiang - "CTV Theater - Another Voice" | CTV |
| Best Screenplay | 王濱藻 - "CTV Theater - Another Voice" | CTV |
| Best Interview | 王振裕、武興員 - "加拿利號廢油輪爆炸系列報導" | CTV |
| Best Actor | 勾純沅(勾峰) - "幾度夕陽紅" | CTS |
| Best Actress | 曾亞君 華視劇展 - "Chinese TV drama show - handed her over to you" | CTS |
| Best Male Singer | 黃文章(文章) - "黃金五線譜" | CTV |
| Best Female Singer | Su Ruifen (Julie) - "rain feelings: Suri album" | CTS |
| Best Audio | Song Wensheng - "Castle Spring (holy stone monuments - solitary Bacha Er) | Ding Jian Communications Inc. |
| Best Cinematography | 陳林訓 - "有鳳來儀" | TTV |
| Best Lighting | Goh Geok Ling - "黃金五線譜" | 第三集 中視 |
| Best Photograph | Zhuang Zhicheng - "國寶魚－櫻花鈎吻鮭的復育" | 鉅棚傳播公司 |
| Best Art Director | Chenbing Yi - "generation Princess" | Episode CTV |
