= 16th Golden Bell Awards =

1981 Taiwanese radio and television programming awards

- Date: 16 May 1981 (radio and television)
- Site: Sun Yat-sen Memorial Hall, Taipei, Taiwan
- Organized by: Government Information Office, Executive Yuan

Television coverage
- Network: Taiwan Television (TTV)

The 16th Golden Bell Awards (Chinese: 第16屆金鐘獎) was held on 16 May 1981 at the Sun Yat-sen Memorial Hall in Taipei, Taiwan. The ceremony was broadcast by Taiwan Television (TTV).

== Winners ==
| Program/Award | Winner | Network |
Individual Awards
Radio Broadcasting
| Production Award | Bai Xi - 逃向自由城 | |
| Planning Award | Feng Junhua - 專題報導 | |
| Director Award | 黃若白 - 廣播短劇 | |
| Writing Award | Yu Wei Min - "current affairs" | Broadcasting Corporation of China - 公司 |
| Award presenters | Zhaowan Cheng - "China complains" | |
| Interview Award | Chennai Hui - "Record Report" | army radio |
| Music-Award | Zhang Wuxiong - "South of the day" | Broadcasting Corporation of China - 公司 |
| Sound Award | Luo Qinglong - "Broadcast novel" | municipal radio |
| Editing Award | George Huang - "Miles Treasures" | Fengming Radio |
| Editing Award | Xu Huantang - "flying Generation" | Broadcasting Company |
Television Broadcasting
| Production Award | 陳君天 - "infinite care" | - |
| Planning Award | Jiang Zian - "The clouds of war" | CTV |
| Director Award | Huang kung - "秋水長天" | TTV |
| Screenplay Award | Xia Meihua - "秋水長天" | TTV |
| News program host award | 熊旅揚 - "60 Minutes" | CTV |
| Variety show host award | Li Chi-chun - "蓬萊仙島" | CTV |
| Broadcast personnel Award | Li Yan Qiu - "CTS News" | CTS |
| Interview Award | 李繼孔 - "Taiwan Golden Pilgrim | CTS |
| Sound Award | 完長元 - "華視劇展" | CTS |
| Editing Award | Duan Zhao Wei - "天眼" | TTV |
| Lighting Award | Yangqi You - "鳳飛飛專輯" | CTV |
| Art and Design Award | Shengli - "The clouds of war" | CTV |
| Photography Award | Lin Futian - "The clouds of war" | CTV |
| Best Cinematography | Linnan Hong, Zhang Jingde - "The clouds of war" | CTV |
| Female Singer Award | Jenny Tseng | - |
| Child Actor Award | Hu Jiawei - "秋水長天" | TTV |
| Most Promising Newcomer Award | Ma Ju-feng - "舊情綿綿" | TTV |
| Best Actor Award | Lee Li-chun - "卿須憐我我憐卿" | - |
| Best Actress Award | Josephine Siao - "秋水長天" | TTV |
Special Awards
| Special Awards | Zhao Lilian - "從事空中教學六十餘年" | - |
| Special Awards | 李珮菁 - "infinite care" | - |
Advertising Awards
| Best Radio advertising award | 統一廣告社 | Fengming Radio |
| Best Television advertising award | 維力故鄉麵 | Vision Corporation |
Programme Awards
Radio Broadcasting
| Government propaganda programs | Peaceful and Happy | Broadcasting Corporation of China - 公司 |
| Educational and cultural programs | Good Night Song | army radio |
| News programs | traffic light | Police Broadcasting Service |
| Public service programs | I love my family | Police Broadcasting Service |
| Drama programs | Radio drama | Police Broadcasting Service |
| Variety show | 鄉土之音 | municipal radio |
| Children's Program | 平平與安安 | Police Broadcasting Service |
| Subject-oriented program | Air Force Rose | Air Force Station |
Television Broadcasting
| Education and cultural programs | 60 Minutes | CTV |
| Drama programs | Taiwan Television Playhouse - revive a brother | TTV |
| Variety show | Happy Marriage | TTV |
| Children's program | The Kids | CTS |
