= 21st Golden Bell Awards =

1986 Taiwanese radio and television programming awards

- Date: 22 March 1986 (radio and television)
- Site: Sun Yat-sen Memorial Hall, Taipei, Taiwan
- Organized by: Government Information Office, Executive Yuan

Television coverage
- Network: Chinese Television System (CTS)

The 21st Golden Bell Awards (Chinese: 第21屆金鐘獎) was held on 22 March 1986 at the Sun Yat-sen Memorial Hall in Taipei, Taiwan. The ceremony was broadcast by Chinese Television System (CTS).

== Winners ==
Program/Award	Winner	Network
Programme Awards
Radio Broadcasting
News program	depth reports	Broadcasting Corporation of China
Educational and cultural programs	Literary Bridge	army Taipei Taiwa
Children's program	給小朋友說故事	Kaohsiung City government units
Drama program	News Theater	Taiwan Broadcasting Corporation
Music program	Music Hall	Revival Radio
Variety show	the length of tune	Revival Radio
Television Broadcasting
News program	Chinese television news magazine	CTS
Educational and cultural programs	Word of the Day	CTS
Children's program	Children's World	CTV
Variety show	Saturday School	CTS
Best Movie	Acme Theater - Moon spring	CTS
Best TV series	Cloud's hometown	CTS
Traditional opera repertoire	Lu Wenlong	CTS
Advertising Awards
Best Radio Advertisement	line security	Police Broadcasting Service
Best Television Commercial	International brand Tsz Fai thermos - trilogy chapter	Dada Company
Individual Awards
Radio Broadcasting
News presenters	Shu-Chuan Chen, Feng Xiaolong - "Good Morning Taiwan (News Tracking)"	Broadcasting Corporation of China
Educational and cultural programs Moderator	Yue Huiling - "the loss of years unchanging love"	PRS Kaohsiung, Taiwan
Children's programs Moderator	Chen Meiyu - "Little Library"	army Taipei Taiwan
Music and variety show host	Zhang Jialian - "Concert Hall"	Revival Radio
Best Director	翁生發 - "this night song"	Police Broadcasting Service
Best Broadcaster	Yinchuan Xing - "Broadcast novel (two accidents)"	Broadcasting Corporation of China
Best Writer	蔡治聖 - "Lantan Voice"	Broadcasting Corporation of China - Chiayi Taiwan
Best Interview	Zhongyu Yuan, Liu Huici, Kang Dianhong - "I Love Taipei (GRATEFUL series of reports)"	Police Broadcasting Service
Television Broadcasting
Best News presenters	Guan Sheng - "TTV Evening News"	TTV
Educational and cultural programs Moderator	Zhao Shuhai - "All together"	CTV
Children's show host	Shen Chunhua - "Mom cheering for me"	TTV
VJ	Chow Mei-yee, Ba Ge - "Double Star Annunciation"	CTS
Best Director	Lee Young - "Mandarin drama series (當時明月在)"	CTS
Best Screenplay	王小棣 - "頂好劇場(秋月春風)"	CTS
Best Interview	Chen Yueqing, Lin Hancheng - "Chinese television news magazine (Thailand and Laos border line special report)"	CTS
Best Actor	Chang Feng - "頂好劇場(秋月春風)"	CTS
Best Actress	Fang Fang - "Mandarin drama (Cloud's hometown episode)"	CTS
Best Male Singer	Yang Lie - "flying singer"	CTS
Best Female Singer	Jeanette Wang - "Wangzhi Lei album"	TTV
Best Audio	Song Wensheng - "Castle Chunxiao (Yami Song)"	Ding Jian Company
Best Cinematography	Tour Yinshan "Mandarin drama series (孤劍恩仇記第一集)"	TTV
Best Lighting	Lai Fengxiong "space-focussed (Tracy Huang album)"	TTV
Best Photo	Zhang Zhen Pu - "skillful hands (Pen's hand)"	Taiwan Television Culture Company
Best Art Director	Blue Wing Yin -"The 21st Golden Horse Film Awards"	TTV
Best Engineering Award	Tony Chen, Lu Chiu Yang - "TV control password (Voice computer controller in development)"	CTS
