= 18th Golden Bell Awards =

1983 Taiwanese radio and television programming awards

- Date: 23 March 1983 (radio and television)
- Site: Sun Yat-sen Memorial Hall, Taipei, Taiwan
- Organized by: Government Information Office, Executive Yuan

Television coverage
- Network: Chinese Television System (CTS)

The 18th Golden Bell Awards (Chinese: 第18屆金鐘獎) was held on 23 March 1983 at the Sun Yat-sen Memorial Hall in Taipei, Taiwan. The ceremony was broadcast by Chinese Television System (CTS).

== Winners ==
Program/Award	Winner	Network
Individual Awards
Radio Broadcasting
Best Production Award	巴月枝 - "空中歌聲「跳躍在生活中的音符」"	Revival Radio - Kaohsiung, Taiwan
Best Director Award	陳秋月 - "Big Ring (opera of the same yesterday, today, tomorrow)"	PRS Kaohsiung, Taiwan
Best Writer Award	Chang Qin Fen - "National Music Collection"	軍中
Best Moderator Award	Yuguang Guo - "Youth Night (Music of Time Tunnel)"	PRS
Best Interview Award	Zhao Lianxiu - "深山裡的國民教育"	等二則 Broadcasting Corporation of China - 高雄台
Best Broadcaster Award	Yang Meiling - "renaissance garden"	Taiwan
Best Audio Award	彭達煙 - "廣播劇「奔向自由」"	Broadcasting Corporation of China - 新竹台
Television Broadcasting
Best Producer Award	Xu Binyang - "Paris airport"	TTV
Best Director Award	Sun Jiaming - "Evening Primrose"	TTV
Best Screenplay	Zhanglong Guang, Wu Huan, Hezu Wu - "Paris airport"	TTV
Best Interview	Tang Jianming - "trip to northern Thailand Special Report"	CTV
Best News presenter	Sheng Chu - "TTV News"	TTV
Educational and cultural presenters	Joy Chen Army - "Love Garden"	CTS
Variety show host	Chang Hsiao-yen - "Variety 100"	CTS
Children's show host	Shen Chunhua - "Happy Little Angel"	TTV
Best Broadcast personnel	Li Yan Qiu - "CTS Morning News"	CTS
Best Actor	Yi Ming - "秋蟬"	CTS
Best Actress	Li Zhilin - "Gold Theatre (歸情)"	CTV
Best Child Actor	Wen Chao-yu - "see Lang"	TTV
Best Male Singer	Liu Wen-cheng - "Superstar of the Night"	CTS
Best Female Singer	Fong Fei-fei - Independence Day special program "Feng Huai local feeling"	CTV
Best Lighting	Lai Fengxiong - "Evening Primrose"	CTV
Best Cinematography	Kao Hui-chung - "60 Minutes"	CTV
Best Audio	Li Zemin - "End of the Motherland"	CTV
Best Art Director	Chiang Chung-wang - "一龍四鳳"	CTS
Most Promising New Drama Actor	Ting Teng-wei - "hand"	CTS
Academic awards	Chang Hsu-chu	CTS
Engineering Award	Shen Chou-ming	TTV
Programme Awards
Radio Broadcasting
Best News program	二至六現場節目－空中座談會	Broadcasting Corporation of China
Educational and cultural programs	National Music Collection	軍中
Drama programs	Radio Drama - Youth Code drama of twelve	軍中
Best Variety show	Rondo	
Children's program	兒童世界－奇妙的聲音世界	
Television Broadcasting
News program	尖端	KPS
Best Movie	Gold Theater - Normalized love	CTV
Best TV Series	Paris airport	TTV
Best Traditional opera	National Opera Exhibition - 大道本	CTV
Best Variety show	Wind singing	CTS
Children's program	Children's World	CTV
Advertising Awards
Best Radio Advertising Award	農產品促銷系列	Broadcasting Corporation of China - 宜蘭台
Best Television Commercial	白雪中性洗面皂－陶瓷篇	飛霓影藝公司
