= 24th Golden Bell Awards =

1989 Taiwanese radio and television programming awards

- Date: 9 April 1989 (radio and television)
- Site: National Theater Hall, Taipei, Taiwan
- Organized by: Government Information Office, Executive Yuan

Television coverage
- Network: Chinese Television System (CTS)

The 24th Golden Bell Awards (Chinese: 第24屆金鐘獎) was held on 9 April 1989 at the National Theater Hall in Taipei, Taiwan. The ceremony was broadcast by Chinese Television System (CTS).

== Winners ==
Program/Award	Winner	Network
Programme Awards
Radio Broadcasting
News program	Special Report: China Education of Eden	PRS Taipei Taiwan
Educational and cultural programs	East Coast folk songs recorded	Positive sound Taitung Taiwan
Children's program	Wonderful World	Echo Taipei Taiwan
Drama program	歷史劇集	Taipei Taiwan
Music program	清音雅樂	PRS Kaohsiung Taiwan
Variety show	Music Holiday	Broadcasting Corporation of China
Television Broadcasting
News program	Tonight	CTV
Educational and cultural programs	Taiwan's ecology - swamp	The public television production and broadcasting group
Children's Program	剪刀、石頭、布	CTV
Best Movie	Taiwan Television Playhouse (money-burning)	TTV
Best TV series	Moment in Peking	CTV
Unit class traditional opera repertoire	The Adulteress	CTV
Traditional drama program	Moonlit Night	CTV
Variety show	quaver	TTV
Advertising Awards
Radio Broadcasting
Radio advertising production	7-11 (Love to come back:charity chapter)	Broadcasting Corporation of China
Radio advertising creative	He's always on our side	Ilan Taiwan Cheng Sheng
Television Broadcasting
TV commercial production	Mr. Brown Coffee: New Music chapter	Flying Ni cineFinance cause Ltd.
Television advertising creative	China Tofu: orange piece	Bodhisattva Lo Television Ltd.
Individual Awards
Radio Broadcasting
News presenter	Guling Di - "Nostalgia Report"	Echo Penghu Taiwan
Educational and cultural programs Moderator	Jiang Xun, Cai Shuhui (朱顏) - "Cultural Square"	PRS Taipei, Taiwan
Children's show host	Li Ling - "Little Library"	Voice of Han - Taipei Taiwan
DJ	Zhaowan Cheng - "in the Canton Chinese music concert"	Broadcasting Corporation of China
VJ	Chen Meiyu, Yuan Guanglin - "Pom"	Echo Taipei Taiwan
Best Director	Yuanguang Lin - "cultural theater"	Echo Taipei Taiwan
Best Screenplayv	高前 - "名劇精選 (牆頭記)"	Broadcasting Corporation of China
Best Writer	Wang Youlan - "Voice of China"	Young Lions Radio
Best News Interview	Ms Annie Lam - "East Coast"	PRS Hualien Taiwan
Best Narrator	葛大衛 - "午夜奇譚"	Broadcasting Corporation of China
Television Broadcasting
News presenter	Li Tao - "CTS News Plaza"	CTS
Educational and cultural programs Moderator	Li Li-chun, "榕樹、杜鵑、台北城"	thirty-one Inc.
Children's show host	Choi Chi-fen - "Monuments Song"	TTV
VJ	Zhou Zhengfang (Fang Fang), 澎恰恰 - "Nonstop Bubbles"	CTV
Best Director	Zhu Lili - "Sweet Osmanthus of August"	TTV
Best Screenwriter	金士會 - "Taiwan Television Theatre (donkey and carrot)"	TTV
News Interview	Tunai Wei, 季義生 - " 鎘污染 tracking report"	CTV
Best Actor	Meng Shan (Meng Yuan) - "CTV theater (love the earth series: The Last sweet)"	CTV
Best Actress	Lee Lee-feng - "Moment in Peking"	CTV
Best Audio	何孟芳, 同以文 - "alpine tour"	Public Television production and broadcasting group
Best Cinematography	Yan Li Mei - "temple"	Public Television production and broadcasting group
Best Lighting	Huangqiu Yang Jiang ShuoMao - "quaver"	TTV
Best Photo	Li Yunshan - "八月桂花香"	TTV
Art Director	朱克難 - "八月桂花香"	TTV
Social Construction Academic award	Fo Guang Shan - "Venerable Master Hsing Yun's Dharma Lecture" program	TTV
Engineering Award	Huo Shudun, Tony Chen - "自製單燈式吊掛系統與燈光作業全電腦化之研究"	CTV
