= Moment in Peking (disambiguation) =

Moment in Peking is a 1939 English-language novel written by Lin Yutang.

Moment in Peking may also refer to the following adaptations of the novel:

- Moment in Peking (1988 TV series), a Taiwanese series
- Moment in Peking (2005 TV series), a Chinese series
- Moment in Peking (2014 TV series), a Chinese series
