= Na Tang =

Taiwanese singer (1966–2025)

Na Tang (Chinese: 坣娜; January 12, 1966 – October 14, 2025) was a Taiwanese actress, singer, host, yoga teacher and founder of TangYoga.

== Life and career ==
Na Tang had four siblings and a family of seven. Her father runs a cheongsam tailoring store on his own, and she started working at the age of fourteen in order to learn ballet, but she auditioned to be a singer and was accepted with flying colors. She went on to study Tourism, and after graduation, when her sister's dancer friend's agency was looking for new talent, Na Tang auditioned and was accepted, making her the only non-academic artist in the audition.

In 1986, Na Tang released her debut album "Farewell to the Boundary" (Mandarin: 告別臨界) under her artist name. She made her film debut in "The Breakers" (Mandarin: 闖將), directed by Hong Kong action movie star Jimmy Wang Yu, playing the role of "Donna", the female lead of the same name. Later, she was known for her role as the second female socialite "Yang Hong" in the period drama "Pearl Love" (Mandarin: 還君明珠) produced by Yang Pei-pei at the 8 o'clock slot of Taiwan Television.

In 1988, she represented Taiwan in the CBS/Sony "Asia International New Talent Competition". There was only one winner in the contest and a Chinese Teresa Teng impersonator was already selected as the winner. However, Donna's outstanding performance in the final made the judges agree to make an exception and Donna became the real champion of the contest, the only time in the history of the contest that there was a tie for the title. After winning the award, she released two singles (Note: 唐娜當時以蔡碧華（サイ・ピーホア）為名發行「愛よ眠れ」與「人恋しさに」两首单曲，1988年由日本CBS/SONY發行。) in Japan, and three albums in Taiwan, including "That Year's Cold Valentine" (Mandarin: 那年的情人好冷), "Don't Come to Me on the Weekend" (Mandarin: 周末別來找我), and "Teach Me a Little" (Mandarin: 教我一點點).Between 1992 and 1993, she traveled to China to film Zhou Yu's costume drama "Wulin Chance" (Mandarin: 武林奇緣), which was broadcast on CTV in 1996 under the title of "The Love of Shaolin Temple", and won the top spot in the ratings. As a result, she was blocked by both TTV and CTS, (Note: 同一時段，台視與華視正在播出鄉土劇「台灣演義」與「我愛我妻我愛子」。) which coincided with the promotional period for the release of her solo album "Freedom" (Mandarin: 自由). She was also unable to perform in other variety shows due to canceled announcements. After the 1993 Golden Bell Awards ceremony, she was involved in a serious car accident when she was hit by a drunk driver who was speeding through a red light on her way home. The accident resulted in spinal deformities, dislocation of internal organs and multiple fractures, and she was finally admitted to the emergency room. He was sent to the emergency room, but was taken home because there were no hospital beds available, and was admitted to another hospital the next day. He was in a coma for two days and finally woke up with only eight stitches in his head, and the doctor could not find any reason for his injuries. He was discharged from the hospital half a month later and went home to recuperate, but after a month he continued to work through the pain. He was even unable to remember his lines when filming.

In 1994, she joined Elite Music (Mandarin: 巨石唱片) and released her debut album "Hold Tighter" (Mandarin: 抱緊一點), which was nominated for the Golden Melody Award for "Best Mandarin Female Vocalist".

In 1995, she changed her name to Na Tang, released the album "Longing for Love" (Mandarin: 奢求), and shot the music video for "Extravagant Pleasure", which was directed by Kaizo Hayashi, and the first time a Taiwanese music video had been shot in the form of a drama. (Note: 與杉本哲太拍攝「奢求」MV。)

In 1996 and 1999, the albums "Freedom" (Mandarin: 自由) and "Antidote" (Mandarin: 解藥) were released respectively, and Lin Haixiang (Mandarin: 林海象) was again invited to direct the music videos of "Freedom" (Note: 與松田圭司拍攝「自由」MV，拍攝地點於日本福島縣下鄉町。) and "The Border of Sadness" (Mandarin: 傷心邊境) (Note: 與藤木直人拍攝「伤心边境」MV。)"Freedom" was awarded the "World's Favourite Chinese Music Video" by MTV, and it was the first Taiwanese singer to be awarded the international award. The following year, "Freedom" was again nominated for the Golden Melody Award for Best Mandarin Female Vocalist.

In 1998, she shot ten music videos for the album "Farewell" (Mandarin: 別戀) and a musical movie of the same name, becoming the first Taiwanese singer to shoot a mini-musical movie.

After 2000, due to the aftermath of a car accident, she reduced her performing arts performances and used yoga to regulate her physical ailments. After years of research and self-study, she began to teach yoga formally and became a well-known yoga teacher. She also published several teaching tools, becoming the first Taiwanese artist to publish such books. She sang again in her last few years.

On December 25, 2016, Na Tang was interviewed by the host of "Taiwan Revelation" (Mandarin: 台灣啟示錄), Hung Pei-hsiang, who laughed and said that she was like a protagonist in a disaster movie. The reason for this is that since she was a child, there have been big and small challenges that have come her way, "I should have been living in a very unstable family since I was a child. I can only say that God and my parents gave me a natural ability. To be very stable, and then to be very rational and objective about things."

In 2017 Na Tang married Jeffrey D. Schwartz, a Jewish native of Ohio who had moved to Taiwan in 1971. Together, they founded the Jewish Taiwan Cultural Association, and the first Jewish community center in Taiwan, which included a museum, a mikveh, and Taiwan's first synagogue. On October 31, 2025, Schwartz announced that Na Tang had died of lung cancer on October 14, 2025, and indicated that she had been originally diagnosed with stage four lung adenocarcinoma in 2021.
