= 20th Golden Bell Awards =

1985 Taiwanese radio and television programming awards

- Date: 24 March 1985 (radio and television)
- Site: Sun Yat-sen Memorial Hall, Taipei, Taiwan
- Organized by: Government Information Office, Executive Yuan

Television coverage
- Network: China Television (CTV)

The 20th Golden Bell Awards (Chinese: 第20屆金鐘獎) was held on 24 March 1985 at the Sun Yat-sen Memorial Hall in Taipei, Taiwan. The ceremony was broadcast by China Television (CTV).

== Winners ==
| Program/Award | Winner | Network |
Individual Awards
Radio Broadcasting
| News presenter | 劉屏、葉樹姍 - "二至六現場「送氧氣到煤山」" | Broadcasting Corporation of China |
| Educational and cultural programs Moderator | Jiangjing Qin (Jiang Han) - "art world" | army Taipei Taiwan |
| Children's show host | Li Weiwei (Li Wei) - "Children's World of Music" | Broadcasting Corporation of China |
| Music and variety show host | Mujing Mei (李薇) - "own the sky" | Taiwan Taipei, Taiwan wide |
| Best Broadcaster | Zhouxi Lan, Yan David - "national network" | Broadcasting Corporation of China |
| Best Writer | Zeng Anastasia (Zeng Ping) - "commute" | Revival Radio |
| Best Interview | Xu Wei true - "two to six live coverage (depth reports - reasonable fares)" | Broadcasting Corporation of China |
| Best Narrator | 黃棠開 - "greening campaign" | Broadcasting Corporation of China |
Television Broadcasting
| News presenters | Chen Yueqing, Karl Tan - "Chinese television news magazine" | CTS |
| Educational and cultural programs Moderator | Chen Yueqing - "Looking to see the world" | CTS |
| Children's show host | Wangbao Ling - "Kids" | CTV |
| VJ | Tian Wenzhong, Shen Chunhua - "I love Matchmaker" | TTV |
| Best Actor | 林在培 - "Autumn tide evening among the day eleventh episode" | TTV |
| Best Actress | Ma Qin - "Creative Drama Workshop (Last night the stars)" | CTV |
| Best Male Singer | Wang Zhengchen (Ling Feng) | CTV |
| Best Female Singer | Sarah Chen | CTS |
| Best Director | Lin Fu-ti、葉超 - "star's hometown" | TTV |
| Best Screenplay | Xiao Zhong, Lin Lin, Zhang Longguang - "star's hometown" | TTV |
| Best Interview | Li Yan Qiu, HUANG Wei-Dong - "Overseas Chinese Culture Heritage" | CTS |
| Best Audio | David Li (Li Lin) - "Yi Jianmei" | CTV |
| Best Cinematography | 奕芮 - "Juan Xiu Zhen album" | CTV |
| Best Lighting | Xu Shuji, 曾新龍 - "Sarah Chen album" | CTS |
| Best Photo | 余如季 - "TTV News" | TTV |
| Best Art Director | Lian Kam Yuen, Jiang Yihui - "fly Rainbow" | CTV |
| Best Academic awards | HARBOR - "Television Art and Practice of" | CTS |
| Best Engineering and Technology Award | High Rongda, Wang Yuhuan - "Chinese PC TV subtitles machines and help develop the podium" | CTV |
Programme Awards
Radio Broadcasting
| News program | 1984 Los Angeles Summer Olympic Special Report | Broadcasting Corporation of China |
| Educational and cultural programs | commute | Revival Radio |
| Children's Program | The Golden Age | Cheng Sheng Broadcasting Corporation - Taiwan and Taiwan |
| Drama programs | superwoman episode | Cheng Sheng Broadcasting Corporation |
| Variety show | Rondo | Revival Radio |
| Music program | Music Hall | Revival Radio |
Television Broadcasting
| News program | ninety minutes | CTV |
| Educational and cultural programs | Looking to see the world | CTS |
| Children's program | Children's World | CTV |
| Variety show | Weekend eight | CTV |
| Best Movie | China, as the theater Shadow | CTS |
| Best TV series | porters | TTV |
| Traditional opera repertoire | 國劇大展 搜孤救孤上下集 | CTV |
Advertising Awards
| Best Radio Advertisement Award | Meishan love account | Cheng Sheng Broadcasting Corporation |
| Best Television Commercial | Unified Mother's Day | 統一企業 |
