= 23rd Golden Bell Awards =

1988 Taiwanese radio and television programming awards

- Date: 19 March 1988 (radio and television)
- Site: National Theater Hall, Taipei, Taiwan
- Organized by: Government Information Office, Executive Yuan

Television coverage
- Network: China Television (CTV)

The 23rd Golden Bell Awards (Chinese: 第23屆金鐘獎) was held on 19 March 1988 at the National Theater Hall in Taipei, Taiwan. The ceremony was broadcast by China Television (CTV).

== Winners ==
Program/Award	Winner	Network
Programme Awards
Radio Broadcasting
News program	HOT NEWS	Army Corps Taipei Broadcasting Army Radio
Educational and cultural programs	Literary Journey	Army Corps Taipei Broadcasting Army Radio
Children's program	Children's Corner	Independence Broadcasting Corporation
Drama programs	Old Man and the Birds	Broadcasting Corporation of China
Music program	Music Life magazine	Broadcasting Corporation of China
Variety show	Walk with me	Revival Radio
Television Broadcasting
News program	Taiwan Television news program	TTV
Educational and cultural programs	弦歌樂舞說戲曲	CTV
Children's program	動物之妙系列	尖端攝影綜藝有限公司
Best Movie	華視劇場－陽光每天都來過	CTS
Best TV series	Father, forgive me	CTV
Unit class traditional opera repertoire	Tongji Bridge	Chinese Television
Traditional drama program	王文英與竹蘆馬	TTV
Variety show	flying notes	CTV
Advertising Awards
Best Radio Advertisement	絲路，天仁重新走過！	Cheng Sheng Broadcasting Corporation Taipei Broadcasting Station
Best Television Commercial	International brand color TV: Flying articles	Dada Television Film Company
Individual Awards
Radio Broadcasting
News presenter	Ms Annie Lam - "Song of Life"	Police Broadcasting Service - Hualien Taiwan
Educational and cultural programs Moderator	Wei Deyu - "literary window (bamboo fate)"	Broadcasting Corporation of China
Children's show host	Li Weiwei - "rhythm 123"	Broadcasting Corporation of China
DJ	Wu Minhua - "music world"	Police Broadcasting Service
VJ	Li Xiujie (Li Jie) - "our time"	electro-acoustic radio
Best Director	Zhang Chengfang (Zhang Han) - "Earth folk songs"	Positive sound radio broadcasting company in Kaohsiung
Best Screenplay	Liru Ming (沈白帆) - "famous play featured (Old Man and the Birds)"	Broadcasting Corporation of China
Best Writer	Wu Ruiwen - "You're my good time"	Broadcasting Corporation of China
Best News Interview	Hong Xiurong - "Week column (金錢遊戲的另一章)"	Positive sound radio broadcasting company in Taipei
Best Narrator	李築新 - "文藝"	Army Corps Taipei Broadcasting Army Radio
Television Broadcasting
News presenters	Paul Lee, Chan Oi Ling - "Taiwan Television news program"	TTV
Educational and cultural programs Moderator	Ko Chih-en, 梁旅珠 - "world of wonder"	TTV
Children's show host	Xupei Rong - "Rock Paper Scissors"	CTS
Variety show host	Zhao Shuhai - "All together"	CTV
Best Director	Zhaoshi Yao, ZHANG Zeng Ze - "Taiwan Television Theatre (前夫)"	TTV
Best Screenplay	Ding Yamin - "Chinese TV drama show (陽光每天都來過)"	CTS
Best News Interview	Hao Ping Sui, Ke Jinhui - "South Korean election satellite live interview"	TTV
Best Actor	Zhangjian Ling (Zhang Fu Jian) - "beauty"	CTS
Best Actress	Suqiu Hong (Guyin) - "Deep Courtyard"	CTS
Best Male Singer	Johnny Yin - "Yin Cheng Yang Album: Qiu Hong"	CTV
Best Female Singer	Regina Tsang 剪輯帶	CTV
Best Audio	David Li (Li Lin) - "Golden Theater (Heart of Gold Series)"	CTV
Best Cinematography	周樣樑 - "Golden Theater (Heart of Gold series - midnight keeper)"	CTV
Best Lighting	Lin Youjiang, Liaoqi Yi - "flying notes"	CTV
Best Photo	Qiu Mingliang - "Golden Theater (Heart of Gold series)"	CTV
Best Art Director	Chen Jinfu - "flying notes"	CTV
Academic prize	Liu Xinwu - "空中學校留校與離校學生個人背景和心理因素之比較研究"	CTS
Engineering Award	Linrui Zheng, Zheng Chunxiong, 游建益 - "automatic ratings survey system development"	CTV
