= Network of Educational Television =

Television station in Taiwan

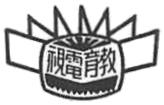
- Country: Republic of China
- Broadcast area: Taiwan
- Headquarters: Taipei, Taiwan

Programming
- Picture format: 4:3 SDTV monochrome

Ownership
- Owner: National Educational Archives (1962–1971); Chinese Television System (1971–present)

History
- Launched: February 14, 1962
- Closed: June 30, 1971

Availability

Terrestrial
- VHF (Taipei): Channel 11

Network of Educational Television (NETV) (Chinese: 教育電視廣播電台) was the first television station in Taiwan, operating under the National Education Archives of the Ministry of Education of the Republic of China. It was also a member of the Taiwan Public Radio and Television Group and is described as a predecessor of the China Television Corporation (CTV).

Due to its experimental nature and limited broadcast range, NETV is not typically cited as Taiwan's first television station. However, it is regarded as the island's first non-commercial educational broadcaster. NETV was later succeeded by the CTS Main Channel.

== History ==
=== Construction and early years ===
In 1956, during his tenure as Minister of Education, Zhang Qiyun recommended the establishment of an educational television station. Two years later, in 1958, Liu Xianyun the Director of the National Educational Archives, made a proposal to use the seventh and eighth floors of a building in Taipei City to house the television station.

In August 1961, Minister of Education Huang Jilu proposed the establishment of an educational television station at the Yangmingshan Education Conference. The conference recommended that the station be established as soon as possible and requested the Executive Yuan to approve the plan for its construction.

The Ministry of Education partnered with the Institute of Electronic Engineering at National Chiao Tung University to quickly establish the new television station, and by November of the same year, the TV station was launched as part of the 50th anniversary celebration of the Chinese Society of Engineers.

In December 1961, the Ministry of Education outlined a detailed phased development plan for the educational television station. Once approved by the Executive Yuan, the National Education Archives began preparations for its establishment.

The Educational Television Preparatory Office was established on 1 January 1962 to develop Taiwan's educational broadcasting system. It was supported by key education and engineering figures, with technical work led by National Chiao Tung University Institute of Electronic Engineering and programming assisted by the China Television Engineering Research Institute. Funding came from the Executive Yuan's US Aid Utilization Committee and the National Science Committee for Long-term Development.

On 14 February 1962, the Fourth National Education Conference was convened at the National Museum of Art, which marked the launch of the Educational Television and Broadcasting Experimental Station. The station used a 100-watt television transmitter built by teachers and students at the Institute of Electronic Engineering at National Chiao Tung University. This experimental station covered approximately 10 kilometers.

On 1 December 1963, the Educational Television and Broadcasting Experimental Station was renamed the Network of Educational Television and upgraded to a 1000-watt television transmitter. Once again built by the Institute of Electronic Engineering at National Chiao Tung University. The transmitting station was relocated to Yuanshan Mountain in Taipei City, extending its coverage to approximately 50 kilometers. The covered areas included Yingge Town, Tamsui Town, Yangmingshan, Xizhi Town, Xindian Town, and Muzha, aiming to improve both audio and video clarity. Plans were also underway to establish eight additional relay stations across Taiwan, as well as one branch station each in Hualien County and Taitung County. Each relay station would be equipped with relay equipment to broadcast the main station's programs, while each branch station would use video equipment to relay these programs.

From 14 February 1962 to 30 June 1962, the Educational Television and Radio Experimental Station aired a two-hour program daily, starting at 19:30 and ending at 21:30. On 1 July 1962, the station expanded its daily programming to three hours, with broadcasts beginning at 19:00 and concluding at 22:00. Later, adjustments were made to accommodate an increase in school teaching experimental programs. As a result, NETV began airing teaching experimental programs from 13:30 to 14:30 daily, and general programs from 19:00 to 21:00.

In the spring of 1963, further advancements were made when NETV received subsidies from the National Science Committee for Long-term Development. It launched an experimental research project on television teaching in collaboration with National Chengchi University. Six elementary schools in Taipei City were selected for the experiment.

As a result, the experimental station began airing daily programs from Monday to Saturday at 12:50. Additionally, broadcasts were scheduled for 10:00, 12:50, and 16:40 every Sunday, following the introduction of additional TV series.

=== Later years and replacement by CTS ===
In 1968, a proposal from Wang Sheng, Deputy Director of the General Political Operations Department of the Ministry of National Defense, paved the way for the creation of a third TV station. This led to negotiations between the Ministry of National Defense and the Ministry of Education, which ultimately resulted in an agreement. On 6 December 1968, Minister of Defense Chiang Ching-kuo and Minister of Education Yan Zhenxing jointly approved the expansion of the educational television station into China Television. This decision was driven by several key factors:

1. The extension of the Republic of China's national education to nine years highlighted the issue of out-of-school youths. The Ministry of Education believed that by establishing a third TV station and creating a television network, it could effectively educate out-of-school youths through telecourses.
2. The Republic of China's National Army had successfully implemented various educational and recreational initiatives, such as patriotic education, education in army camps and for reserve personnels, and employment guidance for retired officers and soldiers. However, due to the dispersed locations of military units, finding teachers was challenging. Therefore, using television to unify teaching was seen as an effective solution.
3. The limited equipment and funds of the educational television and radio stations made it necessary to adapt and evolve in order to fulfil their mission effectively.

On 16 February 1970, the Executive Yuan decided to invest NT$100 million in expanding the educational television and radio station into the China Culture Television Corporation, which was later renamed the Chinese Television System (CTS).

In May 1970, during the 117th Executive Yuan meeting, the establishment of China Television Station received official approval.

On 31 January 1971, CTS was officially launched. With the conclusion of the fifty-ninth school year on 30 June 1971, the educational television and radio station was closed down.

== Schedule example ==
A typical NETV schedule from Monday to Saturday, starting 1 October 1968:

Start time	Monday	Tuesday	Wednesday	Thursday	Friday	Saturday
12:50	Test pattern and national anthem	Test pattern and national anthem	Test pattern and national anthem	Test pattern and national anthem	Test pattern and national anthem	Test pattern and national anthem
12:58	Schedule summary	Schedule summary	Schedule summary	Schedule summary	Schedule summary	Schedule summary
13:00	Advanced Calculus	Advanced Bookkeeping	Advanced Mathematics: Algebra	Introduction to Economics	Advanced Mathematics: Algebra	Advanced Bookkeeping
13:20	Advanced Calculus	Advanced Accounting	Economic Geography	Advanced Mathematics: Trigonometry	Advanced Accounting	Advertising Painting
13:40	Advanced Calculus	Bank Accounting	Business Arithmetics	Advanced Mathematics: Geometry	Business Arithmetics	Bank Accounting
14:00	Middle Grade; Life and Ethics	Fourth Grade; Nature	Third Grade; Nature	Fifth Grade; Nature	Sixth Grade; Nature	Lower School; Life and Ethics
14:20	Educational videos	Educational videos	Educational videos	Educational videos	Educational videos	Educational videos
14:40	Fourth Grade; Nature	Middle Grade; Life and Ethics	Fifth Grade; Nature	Third Grade; Nature	Lower School; Life and Ethics	Sixth Grade; Nature
15:00	French	Spanish	German	French	German	Kids' Time
15:10	Elementary English	Intermediate English	Elementary English	Intermediate English	Advanced English	Educational videos
15:20	News and weather	News and weather	News and weather	News and weather	News and weather	News and weather
15:30	Schedule summary, sign-off	Schedule summary, sign-off	Schedule summary, sign-off	Schedule summary, sign-off	Schedule summary, sign-off	Schedule summary, sign-off

The Sunday schedule was as follows:

Start time	Sunday
12:50	Test pattern and national anthem
12:58	Schedule summary
13:00	Craftsmanship
13:20	Advanced Mathematics: Trigonometry
13:40	Advanced Mathematics: Geometry
14:00	Children's Paradise
14:20	Educational videos
14:40	Have Fun With You
15:00	Educational videos
15:20	News and weather
15:30	Schedule summary, sign-off
