= 27th Golden Bell Awards =

1992 Taiwanese radio and television programming awards

- Date: 11 July 1992 (radio and television)
- Site: Sun Yat-sen Memorial Hall, Taipei, Taiwan
- Organized by: Government Information Office, Executive Yuan

Television coverage
- Network: Chinese Television System (CTS)

The 27th Golden Bell Awards (Chinese: 第27屆金鐘獎) took place on 11 July 1992 at the Sun Yat-sen Memorial Hall in Taipei, Taiwan. The ceremony was broadcast by Chinese Television System (CTS).

== Winners ==
Program/Award	Winner	Network
Radio Broadcasting
Education and Culture Award	一枝一點露	Broadcasting Corporation of China - Kaohsiung Taiwan
Children's Program Award	正聲兒童科學園地	正聲
Broadcast public service programs Award	中廣熱線	Broadcasting Corporation of China
Best Director	Ge David - "Midnight legends - Legends Theatre - wildfire"	Broadcasting Corporation of China
Best Screenplay	葉桂星 - "花香小集"	正聲
Best Writer	Meishao Wen	漢聲
Best Narrator	Moushan Zhong	漢聲
Radio Advertisement	Protection of migratory birds - resonate articles	正聲
Best selling Advertisement	American Express Travelers Cheques - Jungle chapter	Ogilvy & Mather Advertising
News program Award	Good night! Southern Taiwan	Broadcasting Corporation of China
Drama programs Award	Creative Drama Workshop	Broadcasting Corporation of China
Music Program Award	World of Music	Revival Radio
Variety Show Award	pop pie - Life article	Voice of Han
News presenter	宋流芳 - "新聞廣角鏡"	正聲
Educational and cultural programs Moderator	Hong Qiongyao - "一枝草一點露"	Broadcasting Corporation of China
Children's show host	Zhu Ling - "Little Library"	Voice of Han
DJ	Wang Wei - "Music Life Magazine"	Broadcasting Corporation of China
VJ	Yuanguang Lin, Shao Wenfeng - "popular faction - Life article"	Voice of Han
News Interview	忻台琳 - "新聞剪影 心聲‧眷炕E血 "	正聲
Television Broadcasting
Children's Program Award	Children's World	CTV
Television public service programs Award	Care	CTS
Best Director	Tsai Ming-liang - "華視劇場：小市民的天空－(給我一個家)"	CTS
Best Screenwriter	宋項如 - "戲說乾隆"	CTV
Best Audio	唐榮村 - "Admiralty series, care series - last train"	CTV
Best Cinematography	Chen Lin Xun - "Human theater - dancing dancing"	TTV
Best Lighting	黃來明 - "100 Point Happiness"	CTV
Best Photo	Xu Jintang - "Admiralty Drama Exhibition, caring family - the last train"	CTV
Best Art Director	Huang Zhihong - "Bihaiqingtian"	TTV
Academic Contribution Award	Hongping Feng - "direct broadcast satellite, cable TV industry in China under the impact of the development of research"	CTS
Engineering Award	高榮達、簡三龍 - "複頻數位自助遙控立體多聲道播出裝置之設計"	CTV
Best selling Commercial	送炭一九九一系列	聚點影視
Best Television Commercial	黑松汽水- (化去心中那條線) 系列	JOLLY audiovisual
News program Award	CTV Global News	CTV
Best Movie	Love Story bedside - absurd Love	CTS
Best Television Series	Jingchengsishao	CTS
Traditional drama	Chinese opera exhibition - Breaking Yue-Ying Wang Cheng Yaojin	PTS
Continuous class traditional opera	Autumn River plume	CTS
Variety Show Award	Woman Woman	中視
News presenters	Paul Lee - "TTV Evening News"	TTV
Educational and cultural programs Moderator	Li Xiuyuan, Xie Jiaxun - "globetrotting"	CTV
Children's programs Moderator	Liu Chun, Yuchi Pei - "Kids News World"	CTS
Variety show host	Chao Ning, Yvette Tsui - Woman Woman	中視
News Interview	Chen Yongguang, Du Guangkui - "CTS News Magazine - 獵鼠行動系列報導"	CTS
Best Actor	Chang Chen-kuang - "Jingchengsishao"	CTS
Best Actress	Leanne Liu - "Bedside love story - the wind of love"	CTS
