= Chang Feng =

Chinese actor based in Taiwan (1923–2022)

- 常楓
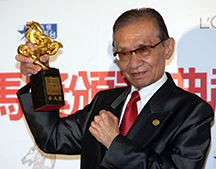
- Born: 6 April 1923; Harbin, China
- Died: 6 February 2022 (aged 98)
- Spouse: Chang Yao (張瑤) (m. 1956)
- Children: 2

Chinese name
- Traditional Chinese: 常楓
- Simplified Chinese: 常枫
Transcriptions
Standard Mandarin
- Hanyu Pinyin: Cháng Fēng
Southern Min
- Hokkien POJ: Siông Hong

Chang Feng (6 April 1923 – 6 February 2022) was a Chinese actor of Manchu descent based in Taiwan. He died on 6 February 2022, at the age of 98.

== Filmography ==
=== Film ===
| Year | English title | Chinese title | Role | Notes |
|---|---|---|---|---|
| 1951 | Wake Up from Nightmare | 惡夢初醒 | Chiang Feng | |
| 1959 | Real Tresasures | 鐵甲雄風 | | |
| 1965 | Hsi Shih: Beauty of Beauties | 西施 | Kucheng | |
| 1966 | Fire Bulls | 還我河山 | | |
| 1966 | Downhill They Ride | 山賊 | | |
| 1966 | Poison Rose | 毒玫瑰 | | |
| 1967 | Men of the Skies | 壯志凌雲 | | |
| 1967 | Spring Comes Late | 春遲 | | |
| 1968 | Interrupted Melody | 巫山點點愁 | | |
| 1968 | Spring Morning Flying Cloud | 春曉雲開 | | |
| 1968 | Lilac | 紫丁香 | | |
| 1969 | The Investiture of the Gods | 封神榜 | | |
| 1969 | Three Lucky Men | 福祿壽 | | |
| 1969 | The Beautiful Swordswoman | 艷俠 | | |
| 1969 | Sworn Chivalries | 名門金劍俠士情 | | |
| 1969 | Sworn Chivalries | 武士盟 | | |
| 1969 | Escorts Over Tiger Hills | 虎山行 | | |
| 1969 | Sword of Endurance | 紅衣俠女 | Xu Guangyuan | |
| 1970 | A Sword for a Killer | 大遊俠 | | |
| 1970 | The Begging Swordsman | 神笛丐俠 | | |
| 1970 | What Now My Love | 太太懷孕了 | | |
| 1970 | Unforgotten Ones | 一封情報百萬兵 | | |
| 1970 | The Husband and the Pussycat | 貓與丈夫 | | |
| 1976 | The Super Rider | 閃電騎士 大戰地獄軍團 | | |
| 1976 | Heroine Kan Lien Chu | 甘聯珠 | | |
| 1976 | A Happy Affair | 大喜事 | | |
| 1976 | The Five of Super Rider | 閃電五騎士 | | |
| 1976 | The Magic Ring | 神環 | | |
| 1977 | 18 Swirling Riders | 旋風十八騎 | | |
| 1977 | The Shaolin Kids | 少林小子 | | |
| 1977 | Confused Love | 變色的太陽 | | |
| 1977 | The Shaolin Brothers | 少林兄弟 | | |
| 1978 | The Swift Shaolin Boxer | 獨霸天下 | | |
| 1979 | The Silent Lake | 寧靜海 | | |
| 1979 | Kung Fu on Sale | 功夫大拍賣 | | |
| 1980 | Undated Wedding | 佳期鬧翻天 | | |
| 1980 | Love in a Big Land | 大地親情 | | |
| 1981 | If I Were for Real | 假如我是真的 | Zhou Minghua's father | |
| 1981 | The King and the Eunuch | 皇帝與太監 | | |
| 1981 | The Coldest Winter in Peking | 皇天后土 | Wang Peizhu | |
| 1981 | The Guy with the Secret Kung Fu | 洪文定與胡亞彪 | | |
| 1982 | Four Encounters | 酒色財氣 | | |
| 1982 | Return of the Electric Love | 大遠景 | | |
| 1982 | Nightmarish Highway | 九彎十八轉 | | |
| 1982 | Escape to Freedom | 黑獄大逃亡 | | |
| 1984 | The Warmth of an Old House | 頤園飄香 | | |
| 1984 | Shanghai 13 | 上海灘十三太保 | | |
| 1987 | Cold | 那一年我們去看雪 | | |
| 2000 | Born to Be King | 勝者為王 | | |

=== TV dramas ===
| Year | English title | Chinese title | Role | Notes |
|---|---|---|---|---|
| 1985 | Ode to Gallantry | 俠客行 | Bai Zizai | |
| 1986 | Imperial Concubine Yang | 楊貴妃 | Li Linfu | |
| 1988 | Moment in Peking | 京華煙雲 | Mr. Tseng | |
| 1988 | Eight Thousand Li of Cloud and Moon | 八千里路雲和月 | Li Gang | |
| 1992 | The Legend of Liu Bowen | 劉伯溫傳奇 | Magistrate Yin | |
| 1992 | No Regrets This Life | 今生無悔 | | |
| 1993 | Justice Pao | 包青天 | Shi Qiao | |
| 1994 | The Heaven Sword and Dragon Saber | 倚天屠龍記 | Zhang Sanfeng | |
| 1994 | The Seven Heroes and Five Gallants | 七俠五義 | Ji Gao | |
| 1995 | The Daughter-in-Law that Shook the World | 驚世媳婦 | Chiu Chen-fa | |
| 1996 | Guan Gong | 關公 | Sima Hui | |
| 1998 | Women at Thirty | 女人三十 | | |
| 2013 | Golden Dad | 金牌老爸 | | |
| 2014 | Teacher Gangstar | 神仙·老師·狗 | | |
