= 25th Golden Bell Awards =

1990 Taiwanese radio and television programming awards

- Date: 14 April 1990 (radio and television)
- Site: Sun Yat-sen Memorial Hall, Taipei, Taiwan
- Organized by: Government Information Office, Executive Yuan

Television coverage
- Network: Taiwan Television (TTV)

The 25th Golden Bell Awards (Chinese: 第25屆金鐘獎) was held on 14 April 1990 at the Sun Yat-sen Memorial Hall in Taipei, Taiwan. The ceremony was broadcast by Taiwan Television (TTV).

== Winners ==
Program/Award	Winner	Network
Television Broadcasting
Best Movie	cuckoo sound reminder	CTV
Best Television Series	春去春又回	TTV
Best Actor	雷鳴 - "cuckoo sound reminder"	CTV
Best Actress	Emi Lee - "把愛找回來"	CTV
Best Director	Ye Hongzhou	PTS
Best Screenplay	Xia Meihua - "cuckoo sound reminder"	CTV
Best Traditional drama serial category	"Han Spring"	CTV
Best Traditional Opera unit class	China, as the national opera: Han Ming Fei	CTS
Best Variety Show Host	Chao Ning, Yvette Tsui - "Woman, Woman"	CTV
Best Variety Show	Woman, Woman	CTV
Best Public Service Program	Love	CTV
Best Children's Program	動物之妙	PTS
Best Children's Program Chair	Kuang Madeleine -"problem cat"	TTV
Best news program	TTV Evening News	TTV
Best News Program Moderator	Li Ching - "華視夜間新聞"	
Best News Interview	Lu Shiow-yen, Liting Yong, Xiao hill - "fake love, true enrichment" series	CTS
Best educational and cultural programs	Earth's pulse	PTS
Best educational and cultural programs Moderator	Ling Feng - "The Cloud and the Moon"	TTV
Best Sound	Hong Ji Ding - "Chinese TV drama show: Pumpkin"	CTS
Best Art Director	任適正 - "Red love"	CTS
Best Lighting	Jiang ShuoMao - "去春又回"	TTV
Best Cinematography	Deng Wenbin	PTS
Best Editing Award	Deng Wenbin	PTS
Best Advertisement	Forever Friends series	長樹
Best selling advertisement	統一蔥辣粿仔條	長樹
Radio Broadcasting
Educational and cultural program	古月照今塵	Revival Radio - Taipei Taiwan
Educational and cultural programs Moderator	Wang Youlan	幼獅
News Interview Award	Chenbai Jia, Yan David	Broadcasting Corporation of China
News program	album reports	Broadcasting Corporation of China
News presenters	PAN Cun Rong Guang	Taiwan Taipei, Taiwan wide
Children's Program	Little Library	Voice of Han - Taipei Taiwan
Children's show host	吳瑞青	Voice of Han - Taipei, Taiwan
DJ	Tengan Yu Han Sheng	Voice of Han - Taipei, Taiwan
Variety show	China and afternoon tea	Broadcasting Corporation of China
VJ	Wang Chen-chuan	PRS
Music program	Music Life Magazine	Broadcasting Corporation of China
Best director	胡覺海	Voice of Han - Taipei, Taiwan
Drama program	Hsing Wu opera	Voice of Han - Taipei, Taiwan
Best Program Writer	Meishao Wen Han Sheng	Voice of Han - Taipei, Taiwan
Drama	梅少文	Voice of Han - Taipei, Taiwan
Dubbing Award	周純一	Voice of Han - Taipei, Taiwan
Engineering Award	李築新、陳文彬	Broadcasting Corporation of China
Award for public service programs	Changhong Bridge	Chinese sound Hualien Taiwan
Radio Advertisement	反正有別人	正聲公司
Best Selling Advertisement	音樂嬰兒的營養	正聲
