= 28th Golden Bell Awards =

1993 Taiwanese television programming awards

- Date: 20 March 1993 (television)
- Site: Sun Yat-sen Memorial Hall, Taipei, Taiwan
- Organized by: Government Information Office, Executive Yuan

Television coverage
- Network: Taiwan Television (TTV)

The 28th Golden Bell Awards (Chinese: 第28屆金鐘獎) was held on 20 March 1993 at the Sun Yat-sen Memorial Hall in Taipei, Taiwan. The ceremony was broadcast by Taiwan Television (TTV). For the first time, the Golden Bell Awards added the "Walk of Fame" segment. Radio Broadcasting Awards were awarded the next year.

== Winners ==
Program/Award	Winner	Network
Television Broadcasting
News program Award	TTV Evening News	TTV
News Interview Award	Luxiu Fang, 翁明電 - "Hot track"	TTV
News show host award	Li Yan Qiu - "China, as the evening news"	CTS
Educational and cultural program award	Living Image	TTV
Educational and cultural show host	Yeh - "strive"	TTV
Award for public service programs	"Care" Taiwanese series	CTS
Children's Program Award	My childhood: My Song	PTS
Children's show host award	Tang Yu Qian, Lin Yu - "I am a good baby"	TTV
Engineering Award	Lam Kam Tong, Lin Nanhong - "Chinese computer teletext broadcasting system"	CTV
Sound Award	Shen Guang Jia - "youth riverside grass"	CTV
Editing Award	Yang Tingting - "Book and Sword"	CTS
Lighting Award	Wang Guang - "青青河边草"	CTV
Best Photo	Huangzeng Xiang - "Human Theater - Urban Fable series"	TTV
Art Director Award	Huang Zhihong - "The Last Huangsun - urban fable series"	TTV
Best Screenplay	Ding Yamin - "classical theater - a home like ours"	CTS
Best Director Award	Ding Yamin - "classical theater - a family like ours"	CTS
Traditional opera	Zhongli Spring	CTS
Local opera class	Swan Feast opera	CTV
Best Movie	classic theater - a home like ours"	CTS
Best Television Series	Book and Sword	CTS
Variety Show Award	The Kingdom Thousand Miles	CTS
VJ	Fang Fang-fang, Lee Mao-shan - "Rose Night"	TTV
Best Actor	Zhang Fu Jian - "Unforgettable"	CTS
Best Actress	Xiao Ai - "classical theater - a family like ours"	CTS
Best Supporting Actor	Long Long - "Book and Sword"	CTS
Best Supporting Actress	Zhu Huizhen - "Unforgettable"	CTS
Best Television Commercial	Michelle - New Women chapter	協同
Best selling Television Commercial	Kimlan Foods - 金蘭素食香菇肉燥－和尚篇	Hong Kong Commercial (香港商加力)
Television public service advertising awards	"United Way Donation Day"	Han Sheng
Special Award	Yang Li-hua - TV opera	TTV innovation and develop recommendations
