= 26th Golden Bell Awards =

1991 Taiwanese radio and television programming awards

- Date: 26 April 1991 - 27 April 1991 (radio and television)
- Site: Sun Yat-sen Memorial Hall, Taipei, Taiwan
- Organized by: Government Information Office, Executive Yuan

Television coverage
- Network: China Television (CTV)

The 26th Golden Bell Awards (Chinese: 第26屆金鐘獎) was held on 26 April 1991 and 27 April 1991 at the Sun Yat-sen Memorial Hall in Taipei, Taiwan. The ceremony was broadcast by China Television (CTV).

== Winners ==
Program/Award	Winner	Network
Television Broadcasting
Educational and cultural television program award	法窗夜語	public television production and broadcasting group
Children's Program	Early Childhood 100	TTV
Public service programs	Taiwan's biological world	Public television production and broadcasting group
TV Guide Webcast	Tsai Ming-liang - "ordinary citizens Sky Series: Champs feelings Line"	CTV
Best Writer	Lin Guiying - "郵差三度來按鈴"	TTV
Best Audio	唐榮村 (唐林) - "see spring"	CTV
Best Cinematography	游銀山 - "The Last of Love"	TTV
Best Lighting	Lai Jiguang, Zheng Qingsong - "The Last of Love"	TTV
Best Director	Luo Yimin - "Chinese television news magazine (Big Brother final destination)"	CTV
Best Art and Design Award	任適正 - "love"	CTV
Engineering and technical contributions	良初、呂照陽 - "電視用棒球測速器之研製"	CTV
TV news program	Taiwan Television News Hotline Tracking	TTV
Best Movie	Jia Jiafu－都是貪吃惹的禍	CTV
Best Television Series	六個夢－啞妻	CTV
Traditional opera	National Opera Exhibition - Mulan	CTV
Traditional drama series	孔明三氣周瑜	CTV
TV variety program award	serial bubble	CTV
Television Advertisement	嘉新文教基金會系列廣告	Bao Shu Audiovisual Productions Ltd
Best selling Advertisement	Proton TV	Flying W cineFinance company
TV news presenter	Jennifer Shen - "CTV Global Report"	CTV
Educational and cultural television show host	Yeh - "Hello Good Morning"	TTV
TV children's show host	Lang Hsiung - "fairy tales"	CTV
TV variety show host	Ba Ge, Fang Fang-fang - "Just Tonight"	TTV
TV News Interview	Liu Huiling, 羅棨助 - "CTV Evening News - 蹺蹺板下的危險"	CTV
Best actor	Wang Jui - "Gold Theater - Colorless Love Series: 鹹魚翻身"	CTV
Best Actress	Gua Ah-leh - "Ta De Cheng Zhang"	CTV
Special Award	王大空	
Radio Broadcasting
Educational and cultural programs	Literary Journey	Voice of Han
Children's programs	Happy Childhood	Fuxing Broadcasting Station
Public service program	Women Place	Voice of Han
Best Director	Linda Tseng - "Hokkien Radio Theater - Abba rice bag"	Broadcasting Corporation of China
Best Screenplay	周純一 - "weeks Theater - Lee thirteen legend"	PRS Radio
Program Writer	Furu Xiang - "starry night"	Kaohsiung Broadcasting Station
Radio Voice	Liu Pengjie - "Emerald Lake"	renaissance Taipei Taiwan
News Program	beating Message	正聲雲林台
Radio drama program	History series	正聲台北一台
Radio music program	Literary Bridge	Voice of Han
Radio variety show	談天說戲	Taipei Station
Radio Advertising	King Car Education Foundation (caring for life articles)	Broadcasting Corporation of China
Best selling Advertisement	Puma sneakers	Broadcasting Corporation of China
Radio news show host	Rill Xiang - "national network"	Broadcasting Corporation of China
Educational and cultural programs broadcast Moderator	Yu Yun Min - "literary tour"	Voice of Han
Broadcasting children's programs Moderator	Zhu Ling - "Little Library"	Voice of Han
DJ	Wang Wei - "Music Life Magazine"	Broadcasting Corporation of China
Radio variety show host	Chen Kailun - "Happy nine hundred ninety-nine"	正聲台北一台
Broadcast News Interview	黃玉文 高梅香 - "深度報導醫療廢棄物何去何從"	Broadcasting Corporation of China
