= 34th Golden Bell Awards =

- Date: March 31, 1999
- Site: Sun Yat-sen Memorial Hall, Taipei, Taiwan
- Organized by: Government Information Office, Executive Yuan

Television coverage
- Network: Formosa Television

The 34th Golden Bell Awards (Mandarin:第34屆金鐘獎) was held on March 31, 1999, at the Sun Yat-sen Memorial Hall, Taipei, Taiwan. The ceremony was broadcast live by Formosa Television.

== Winners and nominees ==
Below is the list of winners and nominees for the main categories.

Program/Award	Winner	Network
Television Broadcasting
Individual Awards
News show host award	Jennifer Shen - "CTV News Global News"	CTV
Educational and cultural show host award	Wuxue Meng, Yan Shuyi - "Look hand talking"	Buddha Communications Inc.
Children's show host	Zhao Ziqiang - "Fruit Ice Cream"	Public Television
Variety show host award	Matilda Tao - "love notes"	CTV
Best Director	王小棣 - "Life Drama Exhibition - nine years old"	public television
Best Director in a TV Series	Yang Haiwei, Roy Liu - "Golden Bell Drama Exhibition - 老伴兒"	CTV
News Interview Award	Lin Lequn, 江旭初 - "民視異言堂"	FTV
Best Actor Award	Chu Chung Heng - "Golden Bell Drama Exhibition - General"	CTV
Best Supporting Actor Award	Huang Zhongyu - "Pillow Case of Mystery of Dabeitaixi"	CTV
Best Actress Award	Yang Kuei-mei - "天公疼好人"	CTV
Best Supporting Actress Award	Liao Chunmei (Mui Fong) - "天公疼好人"	CTV
Sound Award	鎖際昌 - "Life Drama Exhibition - holiday"	Public Television
Editing Award	Wu Baoyu - "imperial journey"	Buddha Communications Ltd
Lighting Award	Zhang Gewu - "Golden Bell Drama Exhibition - home"	CTV
Photography Award	Xuhong Long, Zhang Guangzong - "Taiwan eco developing"	Broadcasting Development Fund
Art Director Award	Shengli - "Golden Bell Drama Exhibition - 老伴兒"	CTV
Academic Contribution Award	林志星, Linrui Rong, Lin Xun, Yang Hongrong - "Digital Terrestrial Television broadcasting principles and its use"	TTV
Engineering Award	林志星, Zheng Ming Gong - "news delivery system automatically recognizes and switching devices"	TTV
Programme Awards
News Program Award	Big Society	TTV
Educational and cultural program award	Writers shadow	TTV
Children's Program Award	Taiwan's child king	FTV
Variety Show Award	Super Sunday	CTV
Best Movie	Chinese television drama exhibition - exodus	CTV
Best Television Series	Springtime Stepmother heart	FTV
Traditional Chinese opera	Fugitive	CTV
Traditional local opera	imperial envoys	CTV
Award for public service programs	健康九九九	CTV
Advertising Awards
Best Television Commercial	Mitsubishi Motors service - home articles	China Wei Gerui advertising company
Best selling Television Commercial	Panasonic Alkaline batteries series ("wedding anniversary" A, B papers and "my birthday" chapter)	寶麗影藝事業公司
Community-wide Advertising Awards	dark green vegetables chapter	Hong Kong Commercial advertising company on Taiwan Branch
