= 38th Golden Bell Awards =

- Date: November 5, 2003
- Site: Sun Yat-sen Memorial Hall, Taipei, Taiwan
- Hosted by: Peng Chia-chia; Regina Tsang
- Organized by: Government Information Office, Executive Yuan

Television coverage
- Network: EBC

The 38th Golden Bell Awards (Mandarin:第38屆金鐘獎) was held on November 5, 2003, at the Sun Yat-sen Memorial Hall, Taipei, Taiwan. The ceremony was broadcast live by EBC.

== Winners and nominees ==
Below is the list of winners and nominees for the main categories.

Program/Award	Winner	Network
Radio Broadcasting
Programme Awards
Pop music program award	East Coast Music	Voice of Han - Hualien Taiwan
Non-pop music program award	九腔十八調	Broadcasting Corporation of China - Miaoli
Children's Program Award	The world Walkman	Broadcasting Corporation of China
Education News Program Award	Dances with nature	Kaohsiung Broadcasting Station
Community Program Award	Found New Miaoli	Broadcasting Corporation of China - Miaoli
Social Services Program Award	love gas station - we pull into love	Kaohsiung Broadcasting Station
Variety Show Award	traffic Variety pass	Police Broadcasting Service
Individual Awards
DJ	Lin Xiangjun - "East Coast Music"	Voice of Han - Hualien Taiwan
Non-pop music show host award	Shixiu Fen - "concert hall"	Revival Radio - Taipei Taiwan
Children's show host	Xu Fei Xu - "magical book"	Voice of Han - Kaohsiung Taiwan
Education News presenter	Sunrui Ling - "Dancing with nature"	Kaohsiung Broadcasting Station
Community Award presenters	Zou Yingying (Yingying) - "方圓萬里情"	Cheng Sheng Broadcasting Corporation
Social Services show host award	梁明達 - "這些人與那些人"	Cheng Sheng Broadcasting Corporation
Variety show host award	Zhu Degang, Qiu Hai Zheng - "Weekend big stage"	Central Broadcasting System
Best Director Award	Yue Huiling (Yue Ling) - "頑童週記--頑童14號(小喜找愛)"	Police Broadcasting Service
Sound Award	Wukun Long - "Sea cinema"	灰姑娘音樂製作有限公司(漁業電台)
Compiled Award	Sui Hao Ping - "想你流行美樂地"	Asia-Pacific Broadcasting Corporation
Advertising Awards
Best Selling Advertising Awards	噴水雞肉飯	Cheng Sheng Broadcasting Corporation
Best Advertising Award	"PRS image advertising - young and old articles"	Police Broadcasting Service
Radio Events Award	Win the tour TAIPEI EASY GO activity - one hundred U.S. dollars taxi trip to Taipei"	Police Broadcasting Service
Professional Channel Award	Human Radio	HSP Broadcasting Limited
Research and Development Award	Wushun Qin, Yang Dongming - "radio remote control system for intelligent mobility"	Broadcasting Corporation of China
Television Broadcasting
Programme Awards
Best Movie	Life Drama Exhibition: Forced Breathing	光影記事製作有限公司
Best TV series	The Outsiders	PTS
Traditional drama program award	Gong Wife	TTV
Children's Program Award	Young Ha Weekly	PTS
Education News Program Award	Taiwan Centennial Figures	PTS
Singing musical variety show award	My music, your song	八大電視股份有限公司
Entertainment variety show	inter-generational power company	United Yee Production Co. Ltd.
Individual Awards
Movie Actor Award	Wang Genghao - "Summer Night Picks - An Officer and a mask"	Big Love Satellite TV
Movie Actress Award	Lu Yi Jing - "Life Drama Exhibition ─ Forced Breathing"	PTS
Movie supporting actor award	Xiajing Ting - "Life Drama Exhibition ─ Nessun dorma"	PTS
Movie supporting actress award	Shu-qin Ke - "home series (reunion dinner)"	Hong Kong Commercial Pacific Star Media Ltd Taiwan Branch
Movie Director Award	Xu Chao Ren - "Life Drama Exhibition ─ Forced Breathing"	光影記事製作有限公司
Movie Screenplay Award	Fu Tian Yu - "Human Caring theater ─ are you looking at me"	Buddha spread Utilities Company Limited
TV Series Actor award	梁修身 - "home"	Hefong Communication Co., Ltd.
TV Series Actress award	Shu-qin Ke - "The Outsiders"	PTS
TV Series Supporting Actor Award	雷洪 - "home"	Hefong Communication Co., Ltd.
TV Series Supporting Actress Award	Zhang Huichun - "Fame"	TTV
TV Series Director Award	Cao RuiYuan - "The Outsiders"	PTS
TV Series Screenplay Award	Fame screenwriter group - "Fame"	TTV
Children's show host	Zhao Ziqiang - "kiss story said"	CTV
Education News presenter Award	王曉書, Chen Lian Qiao - "listen"	PTS
Singing musical variety show host award	Chris Hung, Liu Teng - "Taiwan red star"	GTV
Entertainment variety show host award	Kuo Tzu-chien - 2100 National Nonsense	CTI
Non-drama director Award	ZHU Shi Qian, Yang Li-chou - "Someone else's Shinjuku east"	PTS
Cinematography Award	Li Hongqing - "Life Drama Exhibition - bee"	Superman Productions Ltd
Editing Award	Daniel, Leizhen Qing - "Life Drama Exhibition ─ 我倆沒有明天"	潛行傳播事業有限公司
Sound Award	Fan Zongpei, 鎖際昌, 鄧茂茲 - "The Outsiders"	PTS
Lighting Award	Wu Mingde - "The Outsiders"	PTS
Art Director Award	Xuying Guang - "The Outsiders"	PTS
Advertising Awards
Best selling Advertising Award	"lotto - Westward articles"	奧美廣告股份有限公司
Best TV Advertising Award	"Green Decade Series - seaweed chapter"	Big Love Satellite TV
Research and Development Award	Lin Ruirong - "network architecture of the remote monitoring system - wireless TV transmitter application of the company"	TTV
