= 32nd Golden Bell Awards =

1997 Taiwanese television programming awards

- Date: 26 March 1997 (television)
- Site: Sun Yat-sen Memorial Hall, Taipei, Taiwan
- Organized by: Government Information Office, Executive Yuan

Television coverage
- Network: CTS

The 32nd Golden Bell Awards (Chinese: 第32屆金鐘獎) was held on 26 March 1997 at the Sun Yat-sen Memorial Hall in Taipei, Taiwan. The ceremony was broadcast by CTS.

== Winners ==
Program/Award	Winner	Network
Television Broadcasting
Programme Awards
News program Award	TTV Evening News	TTV
Educational and cultural program award	Taiwan's ecological development	Broadcasting Development Fund
Children's Program Award	My childhood my song	Radio Fund
Best Movie	Gold Drama Exhibition - Juvenile Death Confessions	CTV
Best Television Series	exhortation wife	CTV
Traditional Chinese opera	Beauty Nirvana mind	TTV
Traditional Local opera	drifting Shamao	CTV
Variety Show Award	Super Sunday	CTV
Award for public service programs	TV court	CTV
Advertising Awards
Enterprise-class advertising awards	TVBS-Taiwan native beauty care series	TVBS
Best Selling Television Award	homemade fruit fruit quiz series	Bodhisattva Romanian Television Company
Community-wide Advertising Award	TVBS-step at a time we love Taiwan	TVBS
Individual Awards
News show host award	Choi Chi-fen - "CTS News Plaza"	CTV
Educational and cultural show host award	Shen Chunhua - "親心識我心"	CTV
Children's show host	Pauline Lan - "smart child king"	TTV
Variety show host award	Zhangyan Ting, Luo Shih-feng - "Golden Voice Golden Award"	CTV
Best Director	Zhu Lili Lai Shui - "The New Longmen Roadhouse"	TTV
Best Director in a TV Series	Liu Fan Zhen - "Golden Theater - Time Together"	CTV
News Interview Award	Zeng Wan Lin Xun Yu - "China, as the news magazine - Hsieh's story"	CTV
Best Actor Award	Sihung Lung - "Gold Drama Exhibition - Dream soil"	CTV
Best Supporting Actor Award	Wang Jui - "Gold Drama Exhibition - Dream soil"	CTV
Best Actress Award	Gua Ah-leh - "heng Mu Ma Li Ya"	CTV
Best Supporting Actress Award	Fan Ray Chun - "Gold Drama Exhibition - Juvenile Death Confessions"	CTV
Best Sound Award	席裕龍, Huanggao Ping - "The New Longmen Roadhouse"	TTV
Film Editing Award	Zheng Jintang - "The Fearless Zhong Kui - To Poison Husband"Golden Bell Awards (1997). YesAsia.	CTV
Lighting Award	CM Wong - "Eight Assassins"	super Communications Inc.
Photography Award	Kejin Yuan, Lai Zongzheng - "Wonders of the mainland"	CTV
Art Director Award	Huang Zhihong - "This life - The New Longmen Roadhouse"	TTV
Academic Contribution Award	Tu Nengrong - "TV into the sound"	CTV
Engineering Award	Linrui Rong, 謝榮全 - "platform application design and installation of automatic monitoring system" "Taiwan's ecological development"	TTV; Broadcasting Development Fund
