= Alice Huang =

Alice Huang may refer to:

- Alice S. Huang, an American biologist
- Alice Huang (executive), a Chinese tech executive

== See also ==
- Alice Wong (disambiguation)
