= Moment in Peking (1988 TV series) =

- DVD cover
- Also known as
- Traditional Chinese: 京華煙雲
- Simplified Chinese: 京华烟云
- Based on: Moment in Peking by Lin Yutang
- Country of origin: Taiwan
- Original language: Mandarin
- No. of episodes: 40

Production
- Running time: 45 minutes

Original release
- Network: Chinese Television System
- Release: March 30 – May 25, 1988

Moment in Peking is a 1988 Taiwanese TV series produced by Chinese Television System, based on Lin Yutang's 1939 English-language novel of the same name, set in Peking (Beijing) in the first half of the 20th century.

== Cast ==
- Angie Chiu as Yao Mulan
- Ouyang Lung as Tseng Sunya
- Lin Tzay-peir as Kung Lifu
- Chao Chia-jung as Yao Mochow
- Fu Lei as Yao Sze-an
- Wu Ching-hsien as Mrs. Yao
- Lee Lee-feng as Cassia
- Wen Shuai as Tseng Chinya
- Tseng Ya-chun as Sun Manni
- Chang Feng as Mr. Tseng

== Awards and nominations ==
1989 Golden Bell Awards

- Won—Best Television Series
- Won—Best Actress (Lee Lee-feng)
