= Wen Chao-yu =

Taiwanese actor

Wen Chao-yu (Chinese: 溫兆宇; born 28 November 1979) is a Taiwanese actor.

Wen was the youngest honoree at the 1983 Golden Bell Awards, winning the best child actor award, and was the youngest host of the ceremony in 1984.

Wen married Huang Mei-ling in 2003. The couple had two sons, both of whom are actors, before their divorce in 2007. His third son was born during his marriage to Chen Yi-chun, which lasted from 2011 to 2017. Wen married Vietnamese makeup artist Anna Nguyen Thi Huong in 2020.
