= Wu Ching-hsien =

Taiwanese singer and actress

Wu Ching-hsien (Chinese: 吳靜嫻) is a Taiwanese singer and actress.

Wu's singing career began in the 1960s. She won the Golden Bell Award for Best Actress in 1984, appearing as the mother in the series Star Knows My Heart.
