= 30th Golden Bell Awards =

1995 Taiwanese television programming awards

- Date: 25 March 1995 (television)
- Site: Sun Yat-sen Memorial Hall, Taipei, Taiwan
- Organized by: Government Information Office, Executive Yuan

Television coverage
- Network: CTS

The 30th Golden Bell Awards (Chinese: 第30屆金鐘獎) was held on 25 March 1995 at the Sun Yat-sen Memorial Hall in Taipei, Taiwan. The ceremony was broadcast by CTS and did not have any host.

== Winners ==
Program/Award	Winner	Network
Television Broadcasting
Programme Awards
News program Award	TTV Evening News	TTV
Educational and cultural program award	Wonders of China	CTV
Children's Program Award	Wonderful Wizard	Broadcasting Development Fund
Best Movie	Comrade Xiaoping	CTV
Television Series	Brother destined	CTV
Traditional Chinese opera	National Drama Exhibition - Lu Wenlong	CTV
Traditional local opera	Emperor scholar begging	CTV
Variety Show Award	The Winner	CTV
Public Service Program Awards	Activists	TTV
Advertising Awards
Best Television Commercial	Uni-President Enterprises Corporation Love Sharing series	Creative Productions Ltd
Best Selling Television Commercial	中華汽車 爸爸的肩膀	Shadow Limited accumulation point
Public service advertising awards	Republic of China Foundation for Children burns - Guest articles	Jingzhao grid Television Corporation
Individual Awards
News program	Shen Chunhua - "CTV News Global News"	CTV
Educational and cultural show host award	Xionglv Yang - "Wonders of China"	CTV
Children's show host	David Tao - "happy innocence Park"	TTV
Variety show host award	Chang Fei, Fei Yu-ching - "The Fantastic Brothers"	TTV
Best Director	Yu Mingsheng - "Lang Syne"	Broadcasting Development Fund
Best Director in a TV Series	Cheng Yao, Danny Dun - "Chinese TV drama show - Comrade Xiaoping"	CTV
News Interview Award	Wang Yucheng, Li Ying - "毒之鄉－雲南行 - 系列報導"	CTV
Best Actor Award	Jin Chao-chun - "Bao Qing Tian－真假包公"	CTV
Best Supporting Actor Award	Tai Zhi-huan - "Bao Qing Tian－真假包公"	CTV
Best Actress Award	Wang Miyuki（Mishelle） - "鳳子龍孫"	CTV
Best Supporting Actress Award	Liu - "包青天－真假包公"	CTV
Sound Award	劉明 - "Dragon"	TTV
Film Editing Award	Zhao Xiongcheng - "humane care series - a man wearing a mask"	CTV
Lighting Award	Chen Zelin - "humane care series - blind Taipei roof"	CTV
Photography Award	Zong Si Nguyen - "Peony Lantern"	TTV
Art Director Award	Huang Zhihong - "Dragon"	TTV
Academic Contribution Award	Hongping Feng - "Ecological Change and Development of TV's examples" (TV Ecology case study) "Research - Satellite TV (STAR TV) and the ecological relevance of TV"	CTV
Engineering and Technology Award	Wang Dongxiong - "videotape automatic identification reader system"	TTV
