= Star Knows My Heart =

Star Knows My Heart (Chinese: 星星知我心; pinyin: Xīngxīng Zhī Wǒ Xīn) (1983) is a popular 40-episode TV series produced by Taiwan Television. It is about a woman who, after her husband dies, sends her five children to five families before dying herself. The five children meet again, leave their adopted families and form a new family.

Star Knows My Heart 2007 (星星知我心2007) is a 60-episode TV series produced by Taiwan Television, rewriting the plot. The five children are raised by different families, and the elder sister takes care of her brothers and sisters.

The TTV network re-aired the original series during the same year that the 2007 sequel premiered, dubbing the original in Taiwanese Hokkien from the Standard Chinese.
