= Ba Ge =

Taiwanese actor and television host (1954–2022)

- 巴戈
- Born: 4 July 1954; Taiwan
- Died: 16 February 2022 (aged 67); Guishan, Taoyuan, Taiwan
- Education: National Taiwan University of Arts (BA)
- Occupation: Actor

Ba Ge (Chinese: 巴戈; Pe̍h-ōe-jī: Pa Ko; 4 July 1954 – 16 February 2022) was a Taiwanese actor and television host.

== Career ==
Ba Ge began his career as a child actor. Following his graduation from National Taiwan University of Arts, he continued acting and became a television host for Chinese Television System. Ba Ge won two consecutive Golden Bell Awards for best variety show host in 1986 and 1987, was taken off the air in 1988, and won a third Golden Bell Award in 1991. He died at Linkou Chang Gung Memorial Hospital, where he was being treated for pancreatic cancer, on 16 February 2022, at the age of 67.

== Filmography ==
=== Cinema ===
- Orchids and My Love (1966)
- The Sand Pebbles (1966)
- The Kinmen Bombs (1986)
- Flag of Honor (1987)

=== Television ===
- KO One (2005)
- The X-Family (2007)
- K.O.3an Guo (2010)
- The World Between Us (2019)
