= CTS Main Channel =

Television network in Taiwan (Republic of China)

- Country: Republic of China
- Broadcast area: Taiwan; Japan (Yonaguni Island); Philippines (Itbayat)
- Network: Chinese Television System
- Headquarters: Taipei, Taiwan

Programming
- Picture format: 1080i HDTV

Ownership
- Owner: Taiwan Broadcasting System

History
- Launched: February 14, 1962 (as NETV); January 31, 1971 (as CTS Main Channel)
- Closed: February 16, 1970 (NETV)
- Former names: NETV (1962-1970)

Links
- Website: cts.com.tw

Availability

Terrestrial
- Digital: Channel 18

CTS Main Channel is the flagship free-to-air terrestrial television channel of the Chinese Television System network and is the third oldest free-to-air terrestrial television channel in the Republic of China (Taiwan) after TTV Main Channel and CTV Main Channel.

== History ==
The origins of CTS Main Channel go all the way back to 1956 when the Education Minister of the Republic of China Chang Chi-yun proposed an educational television service that world be run by Taiwan's Ministry of Education. Efforts to prepare the said television service began in 1958 when studio space was first allocated in the Ministry of Education's headquarters, and in August 1961, Education Minister Huang Chi-lu formally established Taiwan's Network of Educational Television (NETV), which first went on air on February 14, 1962, nearly 8 months before TTV Main Channel began transmissions. NETV closed down on February 16, 1970, after it was purchased by the Taiwanese government for NT$1 billion, and in May 1970, Order 117 of the Executive Yuan proposed the formation of a third television channel to succeed NETV. CTS Main Channel was eventually established on January 31, 1971, as a joint venture between Taiwan's Ministry of National Defense and the Ministry of Education. The channel opened on October 31, 1971, the 85th anniversary of then-president Chiang Kai-shek. On November 1, 1971, it started airing English learning classes two hours a day during the 6-8am period (repeated between 1:30 and 4:30pm).

On July 1, 2006, by virtue of the Taiwanese government's media reform law, CTS Main Channel was incorporated into the Taiwan Broadcasting System (TBS), the island state's consortium of public television stations, with Public Television Service (PTS) as the other member of the group. The absorption calls for the transfer of the station's main studios from Taipei to Kaohsiung in a span of five years. It shall, however, be allowed to continue generating its income through traditional advertisements, and maintain its 60-40 entertainment-news programming mix like before.

Starting from January 20, 2015, some digital cable TV companies switched the main channel to high-definition broadcasts. On June 8, it started broadcasting in 16:9 format. On July 29, the National Communications Commission approved the application for upgrading CTS Main Channel to HD. On August 28, Chunghwa Telecom’s MOD was upgraded to high-definition broadcasting (originally scheduled to be upgraded on September 1). At 5 a.m. on October 1, the terrestrial signal was upgraded to high-definition (HD) broadcasting, becoming the second terrestrial TV station to change its main channel to high-definition broadcasting.

CTS Main Channel is currently engaged in a campaign to restore its title as "Taiwan's drama authority", for having been home to some of Taiwan's most unforgettable drama serials.

== Appearances ==
=== Test card ===
The test card of CTS is Philips PM5544.

== Opening and Closing times ==
CTS Main Channel is on air 24 hours each day. Except the last day and first day open at 5.00 am and closing 4.00 am.

Note:

1. The song "中華民國國歌" Zhōng Huá Mín Gúo Gúo Gē (National Anthem of the Republic of China), lyrics by Sun Yat-sen (孫中山) and composed by Ch'eng Mao-yün (程懋筠) was played at the start of each broadcast day.

== See also ==
- Media of Taiwan
