= CTV (Taiwanese TV network) =

Taiwanese television network

- Country: Republic of China
- Broadcast area: Taiwan; Japan (Yonaguni Island); Philippines (Itbayat)
- Network: China Television
- Headquarters: Taipei, Taiwan

Programming
- Picture format: 1080i HDTV

Ownership
- Owner: China Television Company

History
- Launched: October 31, 1969

Links
- Website: ctv.com.tw

Availability

Terrestrial
- Digital (DVB-T): Channel 24 (530–536 MHz); LCN: 1

CTV (formerly known as CTV Main Channel) is a free-to-air terrestrial television channel of the China Television company and is the second-oldest free-to-air terrestrial television channel in the Republic of China (Taiwan) after TTV Main Channel.

== History ==
It was established on September 3, 1968, test of transmission on October 10, 1969 and officially inaugurated by the 3rd Vice President of the Republic of China Yen Chia-kan on October 31, 1969. In its early years, around 50% of its programming consisted of dramas and variety shows.

== Appearances ==
=== Test card ===
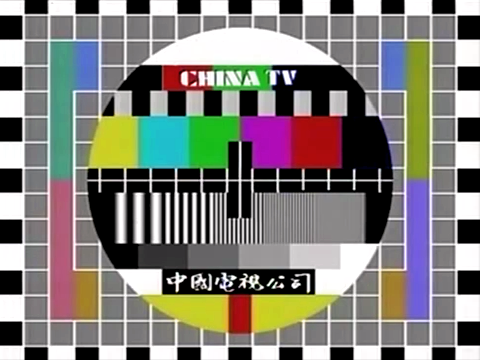
CTV Philips PM5544 test card (1990s–2008)

The test card of CTV is Philips PM5544.

== See also ==
- Media of Taiwan
