= TTV Main Channel =

Taiwanese television channel

- Country: Republic of China
- Broadcast area: Taiwan; Japan (Yonaguni Island); Philippines (Itbayat)
- Network: Taiwan Television
- Headquarters: Taipei, Taiwan

Programming
- Picture format: 1080i HDTV

Ownership
- Owner: Taiwan Television Enterprise

History
- Launched: October 10, 1962
- Former names: TTV General (2003–2006)

Links
- Website: ttv.com.tw

Availability

Terrestrial
- Digital: Channel 14

TTV Main Channel is the primary free-to-air terrestrial television channel of the Taiwan Television company and is the first television channel launched in the Republic of China (Taiwan).

== History ==
It was established on April 28, 1962, test transmissions on October 3, 1962 and officially inaugurated by the First Lady of the Republic of China Soong Mei-ling on October 10, 1962. The launch was the result of a joint Japan-Taiwan study group.

In the mid-1970s (1974 and especially 1975), TTV expanded its transmitter network:

- Hualien: BET-25, channel 7;
- Yilan: BET-24, channel 10;
- Kaoshiung: BET-23, channel 7;
- Taitung: BET-26, channel 10;
- Yuanlin: BET-22, channel 12.

On July 6, 2016, with the terrestrial launch of Taiwan Indigenous Television, the channel's LCN moved from channel 13 to channel 14.

On October 12, 2020, TTV Main Channel converted its terrestrial feed to high-definition.

== Appearances ==
=== Test card ===
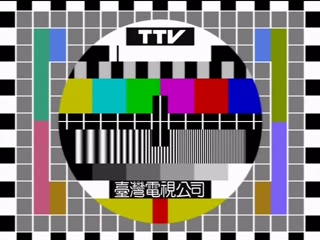
Final variant of the TTV PM5544 test card, February 2014.

From the start of its television broadcasts in 1962 until the 1970s, TTV used a monochrome "bullseye"-style test card. It was then replaced with the colour Philips PM5544 test card from the 1970s until 2014. Now replaced with EBU colour bars and SMPTE RP 219:2002 HDTV color bars.

=== Opening and closing times ===
TTV Main Channel starts up every Monday at 05:00 and closes down every Monday at 02:45 for transmitter maintenance. All other days are 24 hours.

== HD version channel ==
TTV HD was launched on July 21, 2012, simulcasting the 2012 Summer Olympics in high-definition format. After coverage ended, it began simulcasting with TTV Main Channel. On December 29, 2014, TTV Main Channel started broadcasting in HD, while TTV HD closed.

Note:

1. The song "中華民國國歌" Zhōng Huá Mín Gúo Gúo Gē (National Anthem of the Republic of China), lyrics by Sun Yat-sen (孫中山) and composed by Ch'eng Mao-yün (程懋筠) was played at the start of each broadcast day.
