= Golden Bell Award for Best Supporting Actor in a Television Series =

Award for supporting actor in a television series

Golden Bell Award for Best Supporting Actor
- Awarded for: Best Supporting Actor in a Television Series of the Year
- Location: Taiwan
- Presented by: Golden Bell Awards
- Currently held by: Yo Yang for Oops! I'm In Jail (2026)

The Golden Bell Award for Best Supporting Actor in a Television Series (Chinese: 電視金鐘獎戲劇節目男配角獎) is one of the categories of the competition for the Taiwanese television production, Golden Bell Awards. It is presented annually by the Government Information Office, Taiwan. The first time that television programs were first eligible to be awarded was in 1971.

== Winners and nominees ==
The Best Supporting Actor category was first awarded in 1993.

=== 1990s ===
Year	Actor	English title	Original title	Ref
1993; 28th Golden Bell Awards
1993; 28th Golden Bell Awards	Long Long	Book and Sword		
1994; 29th Golden Bell Awards
1994; 29th Golden Bell Awards	n/a (Note: During this time, Television and Radio broadcasting were awarded alternatively. This year, it was Radio Broadcasting."Archived copy". Archived from the original on 2014-10-18..)			
1995; 30th Golden Bell Awards
1995; 30th Golden Bell Awards	Tai Chih-yuan	Bao Qing Tian	真假包公	
1996; 31st Golden Bell Awards
1996; 31st Golden Bell Awards	n/a			
1997; 32nd Golden Bell Awards
1997; 32nd Golden Bell Awards	Wang Jui	Gold Drama Exhibition - Dream soil		
1998; 33rd Golden Bell Awards
1998; 33rd Golden Bell Awards	n/a			
1999; 34th Golden Bell Awards
1999; 34th Golden Bell Awards	Huang Zhongyu	Pillow Case of Mystery of Dabeitaixi		

=== 2000s ===
Year	Actor	English title	Original title	Ref
2000; 35th Golden Bell Awards
2000; 35th Golden Bell Awards	Lu Qi an	Who writes on the bridge?		
2001; 36th Golden Bell Awards
2001; 36th Golden Bell Awards	He Haojie	Wake Up, Mon		
2002; 37th Golden Bell Awards
2002; 37th Golden Bell Awards	Liao Jun	Story of Aunt Jinshui		
2003; 38th Golden Bell Awards
2003; 38th Golden Bell Awards	Lei Hong	Family		
2004; 39th Golden Bell Awards
2004; 39th Golden Bell Awards	Chu Lu-hao	Sonata of Cold Night		
2005; 40th Golden Bell Awards
2005; 40th Golden Bell Awards	Kingone Wang	Evil Scorpion	魔蠍	
2006; 41st Golden Bell Awards
2006; 41st Golden Bell Awards	Xu Heng	The Unforgettable Memory		
2007; 42nd Golden Bell Awards	Chang Chia-nien	Iron Tree	-	
2007; 42nd Golden Bell Awards	Chang Kuo-chu (Note: Zhang Guo Zhu was incorrectly announced as the winner hence both actors were awarded as winners.)	The Hospital		
2008; 43rd Golden Bell Awards
2008; 43rd Golden Bell Awards	Chen Yufeng	Golden Line		
2009; 44th Golden Bell Awards
2009; 44th Golden Bell Awards	Chen Zhuanzheng	You Are My One And Only		

=== 2010s ===
Year	Actor	English title	Original title	Ref
2010; 45th Golden Bell Awards
2010; 45th Golden Bell Awards	Wu Ling-shan	Green Lawn	大愛劇場－芳草碧連天	
2010; 45th Golden Bell Awards	Jack Lee	Happy Together	青梅竹馬	
2010; 45th Golden Bell Awards	Wu Chien-ho	Paper Crane Hands	客家劇場－牽紙鷂的手	
2010; 45th Golden Bell Awards	Morning Chang	Letter 1949	我在1949，等你	
2010; 45th Golden Bell Awards	Chang Yung-hua	Love Practice	大愛劇場－愛的練習題	
2011; 46th Golden Bell Awards	Samuel Ku	Somewhere Over the Sky	客家劇場－雲頂天很藍	
2011; 46th Golden Bell Awards	Lee Li-chun	Scent of Love	就是要香戀	
2011; 46th Golden Bell Awards	Lee Luo	Monga Yao Hui	艋舺燿輝	
2011; 46th Golden Bell Awards	Chu Chung-heng	Love Ali Mountain	戀戀阿里山	
2011; 46th Golden Bell Awards	Jack Kao	Scent of Love	就是要香戀	
2012; 47th Golden Bell Awards	Wang Ching-kuan	Way Back into Love	愛。回來	
2012; 47th Golden Bell Awards	Vent Teng	Man‧Boy	小孩大人	
2012; 47th Golden Bell Awards	Tsai Chen-nan	Garden Of Life	大愛劇場—生命花園	
2012; 47th Golden Bell Awards	Chen Bor-jeng	Accompany with You	大愛劇場—陪你看天星	
2012; 47th Golden Bell Awards	Chia Hsiao-kuo	Innocence	阿戇妹	
2013; 48th Golden Bell Awards	Chen Bor-jeng	Sweet Sweet Bodyguard	剩女保鏢	
2013; 48th Golden Bell Awards	Lee Lee-zen	Home	回家	
2013; 48th Golden Bell Awards	Bryant Lee	End of Innocence	客家電視電影院—死了一個國中生之後	
2013; 48th Golden Bell Awards	Johnny Lin	Love in the Wind	你是春風我是雨	
2013; 48th Golden Bell Awards	Chang Shao-huai	Falling	含苞欲墜的每一天	
2014; 49th Golden Bell Awards	Wang Ching-kuan	Lonely River	客家劇場—在河左岸	
2014; 49th Golden Bell Awards	Chen Bor-jeng	Sun After the Rain	雨後驕陽	
2014; 49th Golden Bell Awards	Jacky Ku	Boys Can Fly	刺蝟男孩	
2014; 49th Golden Bell Awards	Jay Shih	In a Good Way	我的自由年代	
2014; 49th Golden Bell Awards	Yankee Yang	Sun After the Rain	雨後驕陽	
2015; 50th Golden Bell Awards	Chu De-kang	The New World	新世界	
2015; 50th Golden Bell Awards	Soda Voyu	Crime Scene Investigation Center	C.S.I.C鑑識英雄	
2015; 50th Golden Bell Awards	Mark Lee	San Bao Wanted To Go Home	三寶要回家	
2015; 50th Golden Bell Awards	Chang Shao-huai	Mr. Right Wanted	徵婚啟事	
2015; 50th Golden Bell Awards	Melvin Sia	The Way We Were	16個夏天	
2016; 51st Golden Bell Awards	Wu Cheng-di	The Youth!	谷風少年	
2016; 51st Golden Bell Awards	He Yi-hang	Baby Daddy	長不大的爸爸	
2016; 51st Golden Bell Awards	Andy Chen	The Day I Lost You	失去你的那一天	
2016; 51st Golden Bell Awards	Rexen Cheng	La Grande Chaumière Violette	紫色大稻埕	
2016; 51st Golden Bell Awards	Jason Tsou	Youth Power	哇！陳怡君	
2017; 52nd Golden Bell Awards
2017; 52nd Golden Bell Awards	Chang Ko-chung	Jiang Teacher, You Talked About Love It	植劇場－姜老師，妳談過戀愛嗎?	
2017; 52nd Golden Bell Awards	Yu An-shun	Abula	阿不拉的三個女人	
2017; 52nd Golden Bell Awards	Greg Hsu	Jiang Teacher, You Talked About Love It	植劇場－姜老師，妳談過戀愛嗎?	
2017; 52nd Golden Bell Awards	Huang Shang-ho	Close Your Eyes Before It's Dark	植劇場－天黑請閉眼	
2017; 52nd Golden Bell Awards	Johnny Lu	Life Plan A and B	植劇場－荼蘼	
2018; 53rd Golden Bell Awards
2018; 53rd Golden Bell Awards	Wu Nien-hsuan	Age Of Rebellion	翻牆的記憶	
2018; 53rd Golden Bell Awards	Chen Chia-kuei	Roseki	客家劇場–台北歌手	
2018; 53rd Golden Bell Awards	Ivan Chen	Age Of Rebellion	翻牆的記憶	
2018; 53rd Golden Bell Awards	Liu Kuan-ting	A Boy Named Flora A	植劇場-花甲男孩轉大人	
2018; 53rd Golden Bell Awards	Tsai Chen-nan	A Boy Named Flora A	植劇場-花甲男孩轉大人	
2019; 54th Golden Bell Awards
2019; 54th Golden Bell Awards	JC Lin	The World Between Us	我們與惡的距離	
2019; 54th Golden Bell Awards	Honduras	The World Between Us	我們與惡的距離	
2019; 54th Golden Bell Awards	James Wen	The World Between Us	我們與惡的距離	
2019; 54th Golden Bell Awards	Yukihiko Kageyama	Survive	日據時代的十種生存法則	
2019; 54th Golden Bell Awards	Lung Shao-hua	A Taiwanese Tale of Two Cities	雙城故事	

=== 2020s ===
Year	Actor	English title	Original title	Ref
2020; 55th Golden Bell Awards	Phil Yan	Yong-Jiu Grocery Store	用九柑仔店	
2020; 55th Golden Bell Awards	Mario Pu	Island Nation	國際橋牌社	
2020; 55th Golden Bell Awards	Yen Tsao	Hate The Sin, Love The Sinner	噬罪者	
2020; 55th Golden Bell Awards	Yang Lie	Coolie	苦力	
2020; 55th Golden Bell Awards	Ah Pao	Coolie	苦力	
2021; 56th Golden Bell Awards	Berant Zhu	The Magician on the Skywalk	天橋上的魔術師	
2021; 56th Golden Bell Awards	Darren Chiu	U Motherbaker	我的婆婆怎麼那麼可愛	
2021; 56th Golden Bell Awards	Da-her Lin	I, Myself	若是一個人	
2021; 56th Golden Bell Awards	Liang Cheng-chun	Animal Whisper	黑喵知情	
2021; 56th Golden Bell Awards	Yang Ming-wei	U Motherbaker	我的婆婆怎麼那麼可愛	
2022; 57th Golden Bell Awards	Wu Kang-ren	Seqalu: Formosa 1867	斯卡羅	
2022; 57th Golden Bell Awards	Christopher Lee	Danger Zone	逆局	
2022; 57th Golden Bell Awards	Chen Chia-kuei	Heaven on the 4th Floor	四樓的天堂	
2022; 57th Golden Bell Awards	Chang Kuang-chen	Light the Night	華燈初上	
2022; 57th Golden Bell Awards	Liu Kuan-ting	Tears on Fire	火神的眼淚	
2022; 57th Golden Bell Awards	Hsueh Shih-ling	Gold Leaf	茶金	
2023; 58th Golden Bell Awards	Tuo Tsung-hua	Copycat Killer	模仿犯	
2023; 58th Golden Bell Awards	Chen Bor-jeng	Copycat Killer	模仿犯	
2023; 58th Golden Bell Awards	Yu An-shun	Oxcart Trails	牛車來去	
2023; 58th Golden Bell Awards	Sam Yang	The Amazing Grace of Σ	我願意	
2023; 58th Golden Bell Awards	Jason Tsou	The Amazing Grace of Σ	我願意	
2024; 59th Golden Bell Awards	Lee Lee-zen	A Wonderful Journey	華麗計程車行	
2024; 59th Golden Bell Awards	Peng Cian	Oh No! Here Comes Trouble	不良執念清除師	
2024; 59th Golden Bell Awards	Johnny Yang	At The Moment	此時此刻	
2024; 59th Golden Bell Awards	Joe Cheng	Living	有生之年	
2024; 59th Golden Bell Awards	Wes Lo	Girls' Win	客家尋味劇場─女孩上場2	
2025; 60th Golden Bell Awards	Syu Hao-siang	The Bliss	生日快樂	
2025; 60th Golden Bell Awards	Mario Pu	Monday Again?!	X！又是星期一	
2025; 60th Golden Bell Awards	Kaiser Chuang	The Nipple Talk	妮波自由式	
2025; 60th Golden Bell Awards	RD Huang	Born For The Spotlight	影后	
2025; 60th Golden Bell Awards	Weber Yang	The Outlaw Doctor	化外之醫	
2026; 61st Golden Bell Awards	Shih Ming-shuai	Oops! I'm In Jail	監所男子囚生記	
2026; 61st Golden Bell Awards	Bamboo Chen	City Founding Pioneer	都市開基祖	
2026; 61st Golden Bell Awards	Brando Huang	The World Between Us: After The Flames	我們與惡的距離II	
2026; 61st Golden Bell Awards	Yo Yang	Oops! I'm In Jail	監所男子囚生記	
2026; 61st Golden Bell Awards	Pan Chin-yu	The Six Of Us	我們六個	
