= Golden Bell Award for Best Supporting Actress in a Television Series =

Taiwanese television award

- Awarded for: Best Supporting Actress in a Television Series of the Year
- Location: Taiwan
- Presented by: Golden Bell Awards
- Currently held by: Hsieh Chiung-hsuan for Adrift In Love (2026)

The Golden Bell Award for Best Supporting Actress in a Television Series (Chinese: 電視金鐘獎戲劇節目最佳女配角獎) is one of the categories of the competition for the Taiwanese television production, Golden Bell Awards. It is presented annually by the Government Information Office, Taiwan. The first time that television programs were first eligible to be awarded was in 1971.

== Winners and nominees ==
The Best Supporting Actress category was first awarded in 1993.

=== 1990s ===
Year	Actress	English title	Original title	Ref
1993; 28th Golden Bell Awards
1993; 28th Golden Bell Awards	Jaclyn Chu	Unforgettable		
1994; 29th Golden Bell Awards
1994; 29th Golden Bell Awards	n/a (Note: During this time, Television and Radio broadcasting were awarded alternatively. This year, it was Radio Broadcasting."Archived copy". Archived from the original on 2014-10-18..)			
1995; 30th Golden Bell Awards
1995; 30th Golden Bell Awards	Liu		包青天－真假包公	
1996; 31st Golden Bell Awards
1996; 31st Golden Bell Awards	n/a			
1997; 32nd Golden Bell Awards
1997; 32nd Golden Bell Awards	Fan Ray Chun	Gold Drama Exhibition - Juvenile Death Confessions		
1998; 33rd Golden Bell Awards
1998; 33rd Golden Bell Awards	n/a			
1999; 34th Golden Bell Awards
1999; 34th Golden Bell Awards	Liao Chunmei (Mui Fong)		天公疼好人	

=== 2000s ===
Year	Actress	English title	Original title	Ref
2000; 35th Golden Bell Awards
2000; 35th Golden Bell Awards	Lee Ching-mei	Xiaoguang		
2001; 36th Golden Bell Awards
2001; 36th Golden Bell Awards	Liu Hsiu-wen	Marriage		
2002; 37th Golden Bell Awards
2002; 37th Golden Bell Awards	Yang Chieh-mei	Virtuous Women, Martyred Women and the Uninhibited Women		
2003; 38th Golden Bell Awards
2003; 38th Golden Bell Awards	Zhang Huichun	Fame		
2004; 39th Golden Bell Awards
2004; 39th Golden Bell Awards	Gail Lin	String Quartet		
2005; 40th Golden Bell Awards
2005; 40th Golden Bell Awards	Gao Yushan	Finding Love		
2006; 41st Golden Bell Awards
2006; 41st Golden Bell Awards	Shen Shihua	Bump Off Lover		
2007; 42nd Golden Bell Awards	張美瑤		大愛劇場－歡喜有緣 後山土地公	
2007; 42nd Golden Bell Awards	Saya	The Hospital		
2007; 42nd Golden Bell Awards	Huang Xiangting	Haflower		
2007; 42nd Golden Bell Awards	Cheryl Yang	The Hospital		
2007; 42nd Golden Bell Awards	劉瑞琪	Silence		
2008; 43rd Golden Bell Awards	六月		歡喜來逗陣	
2008; 43rd Golden Bell Awards	Wang Juan	General Xu Pangxing		
2008; 43rd Golden Bell Awards	Lin Mei Shiu	Fated to Love You		
2008; 43rd Golden Bell Awards	Liu Hsiu-wen		星星知我心2007	
2008; 43rd Golden Bell Awards	蘇明明		大愛劇場－青青蘭花草	
2009; 44th Golden Bell Awards	何依霈		大愛真善美劇場：回家系列－有你真好	
2009; 44th Golden Bell Awards	唐美雲	A Place Called Home	娘家	
2009; 44th Golden Bell Awards	徐堰玲		客家劇場－彩色寧靜海	
2009; 44th Golden Bell Awards	Phoebe Huang	Time Story		
2009; 44th Golden Bell Awards	謝瓊煖	Marriage of Three Daughters		

=== 2010s ===
Year	Actress	English title	Original title	Ref
2010; 45th Golden Bell Awards	Fang Fang	Hi My Sweetheart	海派甜心	
2010; 45th Golden Bell Awards	Lin Mei-hsiu	Happy Together	青梅竹馬	
2010; 45th Golden Bell Awards	Samantha Ko	Year of the Rain	那年，雨不停國	
2010; 45th Golden Bell Awards	Francesca Kao	Green Lawn	大愛劇場－芳草碧連天	
2011; 46th Golden Bell Awards	Ko Su-yun	Deep Love	大愛劇場－戀戀情深	
2011; 46th Golden Bell Awards	Amanda Chu	The Fierce Wife	犀利人妻	
2011; 46th Golden Bell Awards	Ma Hui-chen	Roadside Chairman	大愛劇場－路邊董事長	
2011; 46th Golden Bell Awards	Janel Tsai	The Fierce Wife	犀利人妻	
2011; 46th Golden Bell Awards	Su Ming-ming	Bluebird of Happiness	大愛劇場－幸福的青鳥	
2012; 47th Golden Bell Awards	Yen Yi-wen	Way Back Into Love	愛。回來	
2012; 47th Golden Bell Awards	Jennifer Hung	Inborn Pair	真愛找麻煩	
2012; 47th Golden Bell Awards	Yang Li-yin	Accompany With You	陪你看天星	
2012; 47th Golden Bell Awards	Lin Mei-hsiu	In Time with You	我可能不會愛你	
2012; 47th Golden Bell Awards	Ko Wei-ju	Ti Amo Chocolate	愛上巧克力	
2013; 48th Golden Bell Awards	Xiao Xun	Love Me or Leave Me	我租了一個情人	
2013; 48th Golden Bell Awards	Esther Liu	Falling	含苞欲墜的每一天	
2013; 48th Golden Bell Awards	Lu Hsueh-feng	Flavor of Life	含笑食堂	
2013; 48th Golden Bell Awards	Yang Ko-han	Flavor of Life	含笑食堂	
2013; 48th Golden Bell Awards	Ko Lei	Home	回家	
2014; 49th Golden Bell Awards	Riva Chang	Sun After the Rain	雨後驕陽	
2014; 49th Golden Bell Awards	Hsieh Chiung-hsuan	Lonely River	客家劇場—在河左岸	
2014; 49th Golden Bell Awards	Lin Nai-hua	Sun After the Rain	雨後驕陽	
2014; 49th Golden Bell Awards	Joelle Lu	Once Upon a Time in Beitou	熱海戀歌	
2014; 49th Golden Bell Awards	Si Man-ning	A Good Wife	親愛的，我愛上別人了	
2015; 50th Golden Bell Awards	Jean Lee	The New World	新世界	
2015; 50th Golden Bell Awards	Hsu Wei-ning	The Way We Were	16個夏天	
2015; 50th Golden Bell Awards	Crystal Lin	Long Day's Journey into Light	客家劇場—出境事務所	
2015; 50th Golden Bell Awards	Miao Ke-li	Someone Like You	聽見幸福	
2015; 50th Golden Bell Awards	Hsieh Chiung-hsuan	Long Day's Journey into Light	客家劇場—出境事務所	
2016; 51st Golden Bell Awards	Tien Hsin	A Touch of Green	一把青	
2016; 51st Golden Bell Awards	Linda Liu	The Day I Lost You	失去你的那一天	
2016; 51st Golden Bell Awards	Lin Mei-chao	Baby Daddy	長不大的爸爸	
2016; 51st Golden Bell Awards	Samantha Ko	Youth Power	哇！陳怡君	
2016; 51st Golden Bell Awards	Joanne Tseng	Marry Me, or Not?	必娶女人	
2017; 52nd Golden Bell Awards	Ariel Ann	Game	客家劇場－明天一起去樂園	
2017; 52nd Golden Bell Awards	Sun Ke Fang	Close Your Eyes Before It's Dark	植劇場－天黑請閉眼	
2017; 52nd Golden Bell Awards	Chen Yu	Love of Sandstorm	植劇場－戀愛沙塵暴	
2017; 52nd Golden Bell Awards	Yu Chiao-hsuan	Reborn from the Dust	蘇足	
2017; 52nd Golden Bell Awards	Liu Yu-tzu	Tonight	今晚，你想點什麼	
2018; 53rd Golden Bell Awards
2018; 53rd Golden Bell Awards	Chiang Yi-chen	A Boy Named Flora A	植劇場-花甲男孩轉大人	
2018; 53rd Golden Bell Awards	Yang Shiau-li	Roseki	客家劇場–台北歌手	
2018; 53rd Golden Bell Awards	Tiffany Pan	Life As It Is	清風無痕	
2018; 53rd Golden Bell Awards	Aggie Hsieh	Meet Me @ 1006	1006的房客	
2018; 53rd Golden Bell Awards	Hsieh Ying-xuan	A Boy Named Flora A	植劇場-花甲男孩轉大人	
2019; 54th Golden Bell Awards
2019; 54th Golden Bell Awards	Li Xing	The Coordinators	生死接線員	
2019; 54th Golden Bell Awards	Chang Ning	Survive	日據時代的十種生存法則	
2019; 54th Golden Bell Awards	Pets Tseng	The World Between Us	我們與惡的距離	
2019; 54th Golden Bell Awards	Yeh Tzu-Yu	Utopia For The 20s	20之後	
2019; 54th Golden Bell Awards	Hsieh Chiung-hsuan	A Taste to Remember	菜頭梗的滋味	

=== 2020s ===
Year	Actress	English title	Original title	Ref
2020; 55th Golden Bell Awards	Clara Lee	Light of Cloudy Day	客家尋味劇場 — 烏陰天的好日子	
2020; 55th Golden Bell Awards	Li Hsuan	A Fool Like Me	大林學校	
2020; 55th Golden Bell Awards	Phoebe Yuan	Before We Get Married	我們不能是朋友	
2020; 55th Golden Bell Awards	Janel Tsai	Hate The Sin, Love The Sinner	噬罪者	
2020; 55th Golden Bell Awards	Hsieh Chiung-hsuan	Coolie	苦力	
2021; 56th Golden Bell Awards	Huang Sue-may	The Magician on the Skywalk	天橋上的魔術師	
2021; 56th Golden Bell Awards	Huang Pei-jia	U Motherbaker	我的婆婆怎麼那麼可愛	
2021; 56th Golden Bell Awards	Esther Liu	Mother to Be	未來媽媽	
2021; 56th Golden Bell Awards	Jian Man-shu	The Arc of Life	她們創業的那些鳥事	
2021; 56th Golden Bell Awards	Iain Lu	The Magician on the Skywalk	天橋上的魔術師	
2022; 57th Golden Bell Awards	Sara Yu	The Making of an Ordinary Woman 2	俗女養成記2	
2022; 57th Golden Bell Awards	True Wang	Heaven on the 4th Floor	四樓的天堂	
2022; 57th Golden Bell Awards	Sophia Li	Gold Leaf	茶金	
2022; 57th Golden Bell Awards	Annie Chen	Tears on Fire	火神的眼淚	
2022; 57th Golden Bell Awards	Esther Liu	Light the Night	華燈初上	
2022; 57th Golden Bell Awards	Hsieh Chiung-hsuan	Light the Night	華燈初上	
2023; 58th Golden Bell Awards	Wang Yu-ping	Lesson in Love	第9節課	
2023; 58th Golden Bell Awards	Mini Chao	Oxcart Trails	牛車來去	
2023; 58th Golden Bell Awards	Wu Yi-jung	The Amazing Grace of Σ	我願意	
2023; 58th Golden Bell Awards	Ally Chiu	Copycat Killer	模仿犯	
2023; 58th Golden Bell Awards	Yang Fu-jiang	Daybreak	客家尋味劇場-暗夜微光	
2024; 59th Golden Bell Awards	Beatrice Fang	Living	有生之年	
2024; 59th Golden Bell Awards	Sun Ke-fang	The Accidental Influencer	何百芮的地獄毒白	
2024; 59th Golden Bell Awards	Huang Shu-may	A Wonderful Journey	華麗計程車行	
2024; 59th Golden Bell Awards	Cheryl Yang	Oh No! Here Comes Trouble	不良執念清除師	
2024; 59th Golden Bell Awards	Aviis Zhong	The Accidental Influencer	何百芮的地獄毒白	
2025; 60th Golden Bell Awards	Daphne Lei Du	Illuminating Hearts	在光裏的人	
2025; 60th Golden Bell Awards	Vicky Tseng	Born for the Spotlight	影后	
2025; 60th Golden Bell Awards	Hsieh Chiung-hsuan	Born for the Spotlight	影后	
2025; 60th Golden Bell Awards	Tsai Hsuan-yen	The Outlaw Doctor	化外之醫	
2025; 60th Golden Bell Awards	Chung Hsin-ling	Born for the Spotlight	影后	
2026; 61st Golden Bell Awards	Sara Yu	The World Between Us: After The Flames	我們與惡的距離II	
2026; 61st Golden Bell Awards	Wang Yu-xuan	Our Bar	喝酒吧！笨蛋	
2026; 61st Golden Bell Awards	Winnie Chang	What A Feast	日日好食光	
2026; 61st Golden Bell Awards	Yu Chia-hsuan	The Six Of Us	我們六個	
2026; 61st Golden Bell Awards	Hsieh Chiung-hsuan	Adrift In Love	人浮於愛	
