= Say Yes Enterprise =

2004 Taiwanese television series

- DVD cover art
- Also known as
- Traditional Chinese: 求婚事務所
- Simplified Chinese: 求婚事务所
- Literal meaning: Marriage Proposal Agency
- Hanyu Pinyin: Qiúhūn Shìwùsuǒ
- Directed by: Doze Niu
- Country of origin: Taiwan
- Original language: Mandarin
- No. of episodes: 35

Production
- Running time: 45 minutes
- Production company: Honto Production

Original release
- Network: Taiwan Television
- Release: April 4 – August 10, 2004

Say Yes Enterprise is a 2004 Taiwanese romance television series directed by Doze Niu.

== Cast (incomplete) ==
- Doze Niu
- Barbie Hsu
- Dee Hsu
- Hebe Tien
- Vanness Wu
- Wu Bai
- Jack Kao
- Lan Cheng-lung
- Cecilia Yip
- Lee Wei
- Mike He
- Lin Mei-hsiu

== Awards and nominations ==
#	Award	Category	Name	Result
39th	Golden Bell Awards	Most Popular Television Series		Nominated
39th	Golden Bell Awards	Best Supporting Actress	Dee Hsu	Nominated
40th	Golden Bell Awards	Best Television Series		Nominated
