= Cheryl Yang =

Taiwanese actress

- 楊謹華
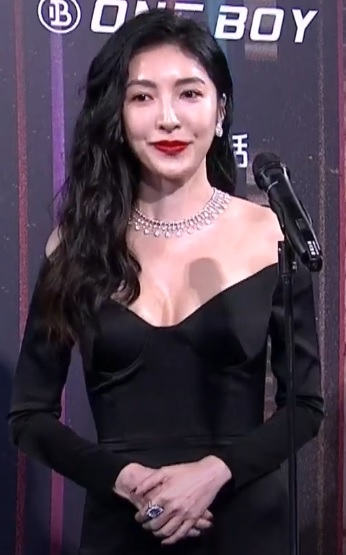
- Yang at the 57th Golden Bell Awards in October 2022
- Born: Yang Ching-hua; 12 December 1977 (age 48); Taiwan
- Education: Yu Da High School of Commerce and Home Economics
- Occupations: Actress, model
- Years active: 1992-present
- Agent: One Shot Entertainment
- Spouse: Ben Chen (m. 2018)

Chinese name
- Traditional Chinese: 楊謹華
- Simplified Chinese: 杨谨华
- Hanyu Pinyin: Yáng Jǐnhuá

Cheryl Yang (Chinese: 楊謹華; pinyin: Yáng Jǐnhuá; born 12 December 1977) is a Taiwanese actress. She joined the entertainment scene at the age of 14 when she filmed her first commercial. Not long after she started her career, she filmed a music video together with Andy Lau, which garnered her attention in the industry. She rose to prominence when she filmed the Taiwanese drama My Queen in 2009 with actor Ethan Juan. Her accolades include two Golden Bell Awards, winning Best Supporting Actress for Oh No! Here Comes Trouble in 2024 and Best Leading Actress for Born for the Spotlight in 2025.

== Personal life ==
In 2001, during the filming of Poor Prince, Yang was rumored to have relationships with both Vic Chou and Ken Zhu. She later admitted to having dated Ken Zhu for four months. In 2009, Ethan Juan revealed during a promotion event for My Queen in Malaysia that Yang had also dated Vic Chou. During the filming of My Queen in 2009, Yang dated Harry Chang of Da Mouth. The relationship lasted for over a year. From 2012 to 2015, she was in a relationship with photographer Chao-Zhang Ke.

Yang dated Ben Chen, a Taiwanese-American businessman, for two years and they married in December 2018.

Yang and Elva Hsiao shared a close friendship for 16 years, but the two parted ways in 2017.

== Filmography ==
=== Film ===
Year	English title	Original title	Role	Notes
2002	L'elisir d'amore	愛情靈藥	Japanese woman	
2002	Twenty Something Taipei	台北朝九晚五	Eva	
2004	West Town Girls	終極西門	Gucci	
2007	I Wish	奇妙的旅程	Qi Li	
2008	1895	一八九五	Huang Xian Mei	
2012	100% Kiss	一百分的吻	Xiao Hua	
2013	Saving Mother Robot	瑪德2號	Fang Fang	
2014	Live@Love	活路：妒忌私家偵探社	Du Ji Ling	
2017	All Because of Love	痴情男子漢	Tan-meng	Special appearance
2019	Without her, Even Hero is 0	我是顧家男	Xu Shuang Shuang	
2020	Do You Love Me As I Love You	可不可以，你也剛好喜歡我	Shih Tung	
2022	Minxiong Haunted House	民雄鬼屋	Ho Sheng-hsin / Ho Te-hsin	

=== Television series ===
Year	English title	Original title	Role	Network	Notes
2001	Poor Prince	貧窮貴公子	You Mei	CTS	
2002	-	音樂愛情故事：張清芳		azio	
2002	Come to My House	來我家吧	Xiao Mei	CTV	Cameo
2002	-	聖夏0度C	Hui Jun		
2002	-	音樂愛情故事：劉若英		aizo	
2002	My Secret Garden	我的秘密花園	Chen En En	CTV	Cameo
2003	Happiness Equation	幸福方程式			
2003	Diary of Sex and the City	熟女慾望日記	Ah Pan	CTV	
2003		心動列車─喔！對面的			
2003	My Secret Garden 2	我的秘密花園2	Chen En En	CTV	
2003	Snow Angel	雪天使	Elaine Liang	CTS	
2004	Only You	我只在乎你	Wan Qiu	CTS	
2004		男丁格爾	Girl who committed suicide	CTV	Cameo
2005	The Hospital	白色巨塔	Ma Yi Fen	CTV	
2006	Love Queen	戀愛女王	Zhang Jing Han	CTS	
2006	Angel Lover	天使情人	Vivan	STAR Chinese Channel	
2007	Mask	面具	Su Mei Xin	FTV	
2008	The Days When Morning Glory Bloomed	牽牛花開的日子	Rong Lian Lian	CTV	
2009	My Queen	敗犬女王		SETTV, TTV	Netflix
2009	Fall in Love	爱上女主播		TTV	
2010	Zhong Wu Yen	鍾無艷	Zhong Wu Yen	SETTV	
2011	Happy Michelin Kitchen	幸福三顆星	Xin Duo Duo	CTV	
2012	Once Upon a Love	原來愛.就是甜蜜	Tian Ru Mi	FTV, GTV	
2013	Big Red Riding Hood	大紅帽與小野狼	Wu Zhang Mei	TTV	
2013	The Birth Of The Queen	女王的誕生	Tang Mei Bao	CTV	
2014	Tie the Knot	媽咪的男朋友	Li Xiao Mei	SETTV	
2014	The End of Love	愛情的盡頭		PTV	
2015	A Touch of Green	一把青	Qin Qian Yi	PTS	Netflix
2017	My Dear Boy	我的男孩	Mei Shuang	TTV Main Channel and GTV	
2021	Light the Night	華燈初上	Su Ching-yi	Netflix	
2023	Oh No! Here Comes Trouble	不良執念清除師	Ye Bao-sheng	GTV	iQIYI
2024	Born for the Spotlight	影后	Zhou Fan	Netflix	
2026	Miracles of the ER	急診室的奇蹟	He Yu-hua	Netflix	

=== Music video appearances ===
Artist	Song title	Notes
Coco Lee	It's a Party	-
Andy Lau	Les Miserables	-
Andy Lau	Ice Rain	-
Andy Lau	Stolen Memories	-
Andy Lau	Boys and Girls	-
Julia Peng	Memorable	-
Wang Pei Rong	Let Go	-
Jeff Chang	From The Beginning Until Now	-
Elva Hsiao	Spread Your Wings and Fly	-
Shunza	我心動了、 And The Music There…	-
Jay Chou	Dad, I'm Back	-
Ronald Cheng; Kelly Chen	Milky Way	-
Elva Hsiao	Both Lonely	-
A-do	Almost	-
Fish Leong	Looking For Someone	My Queen OST
David Tao	Adoration	-
David Tao	Your Song	-
David Tao	Zero to Hero	-
David Tao	RE:DT	-
Huang Xiaoming	MOOPA (Move Party)	-
A-Lin	We will be Better	-
Wan Fang	New everlasting love	-
Ella Chen	Don't Stay	-

== Theater ==
- "Shakespeare" by Edward Yang
- "The Importance of Being Earnest by Oscar Wilde

== Awards and nominations ==
Year	Award	Category	Work	Result	Ref.
2007	42nd Golden Bell Awards	Best Supporting Actress in a Television Series	The Hospital	Nominated	
2009	44th Golden Bell Awards	Best Leading Actress in a Television Series	My Queen	Nominated	
2014	49th Golden Bell Awards	Best Leading Actress in a Television Series	The Queen!	Nominated	
2016	51st Golden Bell Awards	Best Leading Actress in a Television Series	A Touch of Green	Nominated	
2016	21st Asian Television Awards	Best Leading Actress	A Touch of Green	Won	
2017	52nd Golden Bell Awards	Best Leading Actress in a Miniseries or Television Film	Rock Records in Love - New Everlasting Love	Nominated	
2020	55th Golden Bell Awards	Best Leading Actress in a Television Series	The Mirror	Nominated	
2020	25th Asian Television Awards	Best Leading Actress	The Mirror	Nominated	
2022	57th Golden Bell Awards	Best Leading Actress in a Television Series	Light the Night	Nominated	
2022	5th Asian Academy Creative Awards	Best Leading Actress	Light the Night	Nominated	
2024	59th Golden Bell Awards	Best Supporting Actress in a Television Series	Oh No! Here Comes Trouble	Won	
2025	60th Golden Bell Awards	Best Leading Actress in a Television Series	Born for the Spotlight	Won	
