= Vent Teng =

Taiwanese comedian and actor

Vent Teng (Chinese: 鄧志鴻; Pe̍h-ōe-jī: Tēng Chì-hông; Pha̍k-fa-sṳ: Thèn Chì-fûng; born 1950) is a Taiwanese comedian and actor.

Teng's paternal ancestry can be traced to Guangdong. Two of his siblings became a hairdresser and actor, respectively. Teng also pursued a career in entertainment, starting out as a singer. In 1983, Teng became a television show host. His best known character at this time was Old Angel. He started impersonating politician Yu Kuo-hwa in 1989, and was acknowledged as the first Taiwanese comedian to perform political impressions, as politicians were avoided as topics of jokes prior to Teng's exploration in the field of political humor. He added more political impressions over time and grew in popularity. Starting in 1992, Teng's political skits were broadcast by Taiwan Television, China Television, and Chinese Television System, as well as distributed on cassette tapes. During the 1994 Taiwanese local elections, the three networks limited broadcasts of his performances, to avoid showing favoritism to any single candidate. Teng was shortlisted for a Golden Bell Award for Best Supporting Actor during the 47th Golden Bell Awards ceremony held in 2012, for his role in Man‧Boy.

== Selected filmography ==
- A Hint of You (2013)
- When I See You Again (2015)
- The Falls (2021)
