= In Time with You =

2011 Taiwanese television series

- Promotional poster for In Time with You

Chinese name
- Traditional Chinese: 我可能不會愛你
Transcriptions
Standard Mandarin
- Hanyu Pinyin: Wǒ Kěnéng Bùhuì Ài Nǐ
- Genre: Romance
- Written by: Mag Hsu
- Directed by: Winnie Chu
- Starring: Ariel Lin; Chen Bolin; Andrea Chen; Sunny Wang
- Opening theme: 還是會 - William Wei
- Ending theme: 翅膀 - Ariel Lin
- Country of origin: Taiwan
- Original languages: Mandarin; Taiwanese
- No. of episodes: 13

Production
- Production locations: Taiwan, Singapore
- Running time: 80 mins

Original release
- Network: FTV
- Release: 18 September – 11 December 2011

Related
- Hayate the Combat Butler; Skip Beat!; The Time We Were Not in Love

In Time with You (Chinese: 我可能不會愛你; lit. 'I Might Not Love You') is a 2011 Taiwanese television series written by Mag Hsu and directed by Winnie Chu. It stars Ariel Lin and Chen Bolin.

== Synopsis ==
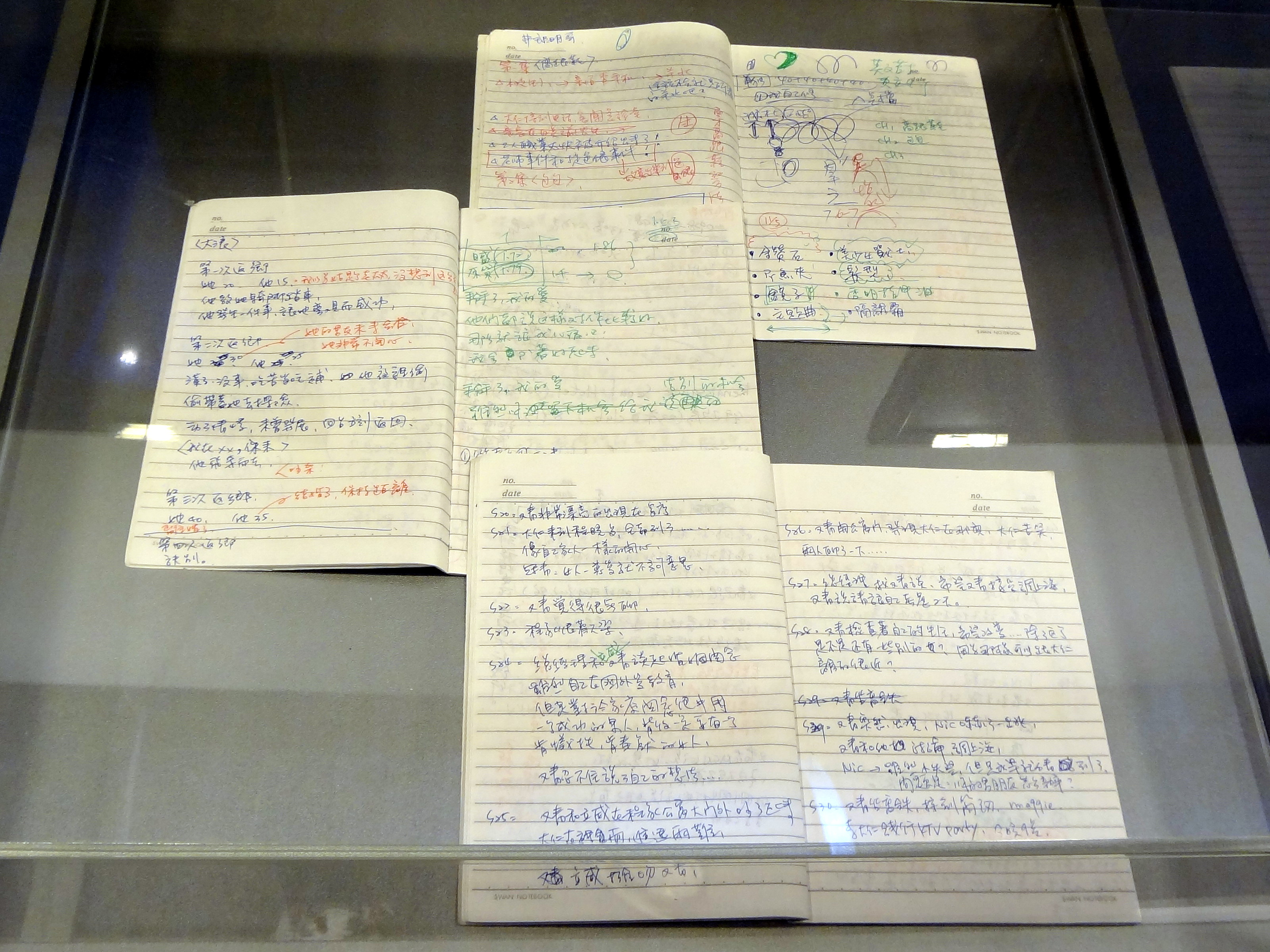
Screenplay manuscripts of In Time with You

Cheng You Qing (Ariel Lin) is the manager of a Taiwanese shoe manufacturer. On her 30th birthday, Cheng You Qing receives an email on "the symptoms of premature aging" from Li Da Ren (Chen Bolin), her best friend who she has known since high school. Unable to accept that he is like a bottle of fine wine that will get better with age and she is like a grape that will dry into a raisin as years go by, she agrees to a bet with Da Ren to see who will get married first before they turn 35. So they start to look for their potential lovers.

However, Da Ren often says the girls he date are not a match for him and at the same time, he is not satisfied with the boys You Qing dates. After Da Ren's relationship with his colleague, Maggie, he admits to Maggie that he has been in love with You Qing the whole time. But there is a coincidence that when You Qing is single, Da Ren has a girlfriend; while Da Ren break up with his girlfriend, You Qing has reconciled with her ex-boyfriend. So Da Ren is always missing the opportunity to tell You Qing his true feelings.

As Cheng You Qing looks around for a potential husband, she discovers that she was surrounded by unacceptable candidates. The only man who could love her despite her ill temper and stubbornness is her best friend. The only problem with this pairing is their extensive friendship.

== Cast ==
Actor	Character	Description
Ariel Lin	Cheng You Qing	Proud, confident and ambitious; she has a very strong character
Chen Bolin	Li Da Ren	Kind hearted; knows You Qing very well and loves her.
Andrea Chen	Maggie (Li's colleague)	Likes Da Ren; innocent and cute, but desperate for a husband
Sunny Wang	Ding Li Wei; Will	A brilliant man; likes You Qing; too proud of himself.
Lin Mei-hsiu	You Qing's mother	Very kind mom; knows You Qing well; likes Li Da Ren
Luo Bei An	You Qing's father	Lazy; kind to You Qing's mother; loves You Qing very much.
Ying Wei-min	Cheng Guan Qing	You Qing's brother; lazy; does not like Li Wei to be You Qing's husband
Ma Nan	Guan Qing's wife	--
Monica Yin	Cheng Mei Qing	You Qing's happy sister with a happy family
Xie Yu Wei	Mei Qing's husband	Plain looking; a kind heart
Zhou Dan Wei	Da Ren's mother	Be viewed as an old princess
Summer Meng	Li Tao Tao	Da Ren's sister; rebellious and bad tempered; always against her mother
Chin Shih-chieh	Bai Shu	Da Ren's mother's best friend and later husband
Jerry Huang	Henry	You Qing's caring ex-boyfriend and co-worker
David Hsu	Nic (You Qing's assistant)	Gay assistant who attempted to exploit You Qing
Ma Shi Li	Manager	Likes You Qing very much; repeatedly tries to promote her
Joelle Lu	Grace	You Qing's stringent co-worker; later boss
Yu Han Mi	Lala (Henry's girlfriend)	Cute and young
Ya Zi (丫子)	Lu Xing Di	You Qing and Da Ren's high school classmate; guileless; complete plastic; married a rich guy
Emerson Tsai	Di Shu	
Zeng Wei Hao	Da Cong	
Li Wei Wie	Zi Lin	
Jasper Liu	Mei Nan	
An Wei Ling	Mei Mei	
Jesseca Liu	Huang Hai Yan	Girl who had a crush on Li Da Ren
Nick Shen	Woody	
Joanne Tseng	Chen Pingan	Best friend of Lin Kai, but also likes him
A-Bin Fang	Lin Kai	Best friends with Pingan, works in the Singapore Airport with Da Ren
Pearl Hsieh	Xiao mi	You Qing's subordinate staff

== Soundtrack ==
In Time with You

Soundtrack album
- Released: 19 October 2011
- Genre: Mandopop
- Language: Mandarin
- Label: Linfair Records

In Time with You Original Soundtrack (我可能不會愛你 電視原聲帶) was released on 19 October 2011, by various artists under Linfair Records. It contains ten songs, three of which are instrumental versions. The opening theme song is "Hai Shi Hui" or "Still Am" by William Wei, while the ending theme song is by Ariel Lin entitled "Chi Bang" or "Wings".

=== Track listing ===
No.	Title	Singer	Length
1.	"Still Am" (還是會 (Hai Shi Hui))	William Wei
2.	"Wings" (翅膀 (Chi Bang))	Ariel Lin
3.	"I Won't Like You inst." (我不會喜歡你)
4.	"Still Am inst." (還是會)
5.	"Starting Now" (現在開始 (Xian Zai Kai Shi))	Biung Wang
6.	"A Friend of a Friend" (普通朋友的朋友 (Pu Tong Peng You De Peng You))	Tsai Chang Hsien
7.	"Tiptoe Love" (踮起腳尖愛 (Dian Qi Jiao Jian Ai))	Hong Pei Yu
8.	"Wings inst." (翅膀)
9.	"I Won't Like You" (我不會喜歡你)	Bolin Chen
10.	"Rotating Door" (旋轉門)	Aggie Hsieh

== Reception ==
Formosa Television (FTV) ratings
Original broadcast date	Episode number	Average	Timeslot rank	Notes
18 September 2011	1	1.41	2	
25 September 2011	2	1.24	2	CTS They Are Flying finale
2 October 2011	3	1.65	2	CTS Ring Ring Bell premiere
9 October 2011	4	2.09	2	
16 October 2011	5	2.34	2	
23 October 2011	6	2.56	2	
30 October 2011	7	2.64	2	
6 November 2011	8	3.11	2	CTV Love Recipe finale
13 November 2011	9	3.07	2	
20 November 2011	10	3.62	2	
27 November 2011	11	3.54	2	
4 December 2011	12	3.65	2	
11 December 2011	13	5.51	1	
Average	-	2.80	2	

Rival dramas on air at the same time:

- TTV Main Channel (TTV) (台視): Office Girls (小資女孩向前衝)
- CTV Main Channel (CTV) (中視): Love Recipe (料理情人夢)
- CTS Main Channel (CTS) (華視): They Are Flying (飛行少年) / Ring Ring Bell (真心請按兩次鈴)

== International broadcasting ==
The drama was shown in other countries including China, Singapore, Hong Kong, Canada, the Philippines, United States, Malaysia and Korea. In Japan, the drama was broadcast on So-net from 12 September to 28 November 2012, on Wednesdays and Thursdays at 18:00 to 19:02. It was also shown on BS NTV from 27 February to 7 August 2013 on Wednesdays at 23:00 to 24:00. The drama was also broadcast on Japanese cable channel DATV with Japanese subtitles. In Singapore, it began on 28 September 2011 on Starhub's cable channel E City.

In Thailand, it was shown on Channel 7 beginning on 25 November 2014 at 02:00 to 03:00.

== Remakes ==
A Korean drama remake titled The Time We Were Not in Love, starring Ha Ji-won and Lee Jin-wook, aired on SBS in June 2015. Japanese remake titled "I don't love you yet" aired on Fuji TV on July 15, 2019.

Thailand will be adapting the series in 2018, starring Mo Monchanok Saengchaipiangpen and Pae Arak Amornsupasiri. Chinese Remake in 2018

== Awards and nominations ==
Year	Award	Category	Recipients	Result
2012	47th Golden Bell Awards	Best Television Series	In Time with You	Won
2012	47th Golden Bell Awards	Best Actor	Chen Bolin	Won
2012	47th Golden Bell Awards	Best Actress	Ariel Lin	Won
2012	47th Golden Bell Awards	Best Supporting Actress	Lin Mei-hsiu	Won
2012	47th Golden Bell Awards	Best Director in a Television Series	Winnie Chu	Won
2012	47th Golden Bell Awards	Best Writing for a Television Series	Mag Hsu	Won
2012	47th Golden Bell Awards	Best Editing	In Time with You	Nominated
2012	47th Golden Bell Awards	Best Marketing	In Time with You	Won
