= Chang Kuo-chu =

Taiwanese actor (born 1948)

Chang Kuo-Chu
- 張國柱
- Born: 17 October 1948 (age 77)
- Occupation: Actor
- Years active: 1977–present
- Spouse: Zhao Xinran (m. 1971; div. 1994)

Chang Kuo-chu (Chinese: 張國柱; Pe̍h-ōe-jī: Tiuⁿ Kok-chū; born 17 October 1948) is a Taiwanese actor. He was erroneously declared the winner of the 2007 Golden Bell Award for Best Supporting Actor, because his name was similar to awardee Chang Chia-nien. Both were acknowledged as joint winners.

His son Chang Chen is also an actor.

== Selected filmography ==
- The Butterfly Murders (1979)
- Let's Make Laugh (1983)
- Stone Age Warriors (1991)
- A Brighter Summer Day (1991)
- Handsome Siblings (1992)
- Mahjong (1996)
- Meteor Garden II (2002)
- Mars (2004)
- The Hospital (2006)
- Driverless (2010)
- Summer's Desire (2010)
- Two Fathers (2013)
- Cold War 2 (2016)
- Guilty of Mind (2017)
- See You Again (2019)
- Detective Chinatown (2020)
