= Lin Mei-hsiu =

Taiwanese actress and television host

- Born: 6 June 1967 (age 59); Luodong, Yilan County, Taiwan
- Other name: Lin Meixiu
- Education: National Kuo Kuang Academy of Arts
- Occupations: Actress; television host; dancer
- Years active: 1986–present
- Spouse: Chang Hsi-ming (m. 2014)

Chinese name
- Chinese: 林美秀
Transcriptions
Standard Mandarin
- Hanyu Pinyin: Lín Měixiù
Southern Min
- Hokkien POJ: Lîm Bí-siù

Lin Mei-hsiu (Chinese: 林美秀; Pe̍h-ōe-jī: Lîm Bí-siù; born 6 June 1967) is a Taiwanese actress and television host. Through perseverance, she created signature roles and became well-known in Taiwan. Throughout her career, Lin has starred in a wide variety of works, including stage plays, television series, and films, gaining recognition among Taiwanese audiences for her contributions to drama. Thanks to her outstanding acting skills, she has received prestigious awards, including the Golden Horse Award and multiple Golden Bell Awards.

== Early life ==
Lin Mei-Hsiu (born 6 June 1967) spent most of her childhoold in Luo Dong, I-Lan county, Taiwan. When she was at elementary school, Lin joined the Pauline Lan Dancers Troupe as a dancer. Later she graduate from National Kuo Kuang Academy of Arts (now National Taiwan College of Performing Arts, TCPA).

== Career ==
In 1986, Lin Mei-hsiu began her career as a dancer with Pauline Lan's troupe. She later met Hugh K. S. Lee, who recognized her performing talent and invited her to join the Ping-Fong Acting Troupe as his apprentice. Starting in 1994, Lin performed in a diverse range of stage productions with the Ping-Fong Acting Troupe, spanning genres such as comedy, tragedy, pop musicals, and science fiction. She has often credited her mentor, Lee Kuo-hsiu, with discovering and nurturing her acting potential.

A key breakthrough came when she stepped in as a last-minute replacement for another actress in a production. Her portrayal of a middle-aged woman in that role resonated strongly with audiences and established her reputation for such characters. Through perseverance, Lin achieved wider fame in 2003 with her iconic performance as Meng Jiangnu in a series of advertisements for King To Nin Jiom directed by Chen Yu-hsun.

These experiences propelled Lin into further opportunities in theater (including with the Green Ray Theatre Company), television, theater and films.Impressed by her performance in the advertisements, Chen Yu-hsun later created a lead role specifically for her in his 2013 blockbuster film Zone Pro Site (總鋪師). She played a strong, simple and diligent Taiwanese mother and street food vendor—embodying a simple, strong, and diligent woman.

Lin experimented in a new type of performance in collaboration with three well-known Taiwanese figures in the industry - Tang Tsung Sheng, Sam Tseng, and Zheng Yinsheng in a 2022 participatory theatre, entitled Heroes Are Who Can Act (會演是英雄) by UDNFunLife. By incorporating various performantive forms including talkshows, dramas, and real-time polling, the audience were able to influence the storyline of the comedy. This new type of performance received positive feedback and was praised for its humorous and laid-back atmosphere.

== Works ==
From 1994 to 2004, she has worked with various theater troupes, including the Ping-Fong Acting Troupe and the Spring Sun Performing Arts Troupe (now known as the Spring River Performing Arts Troupe). Some of the plays she has performed in with the Green Ray Theatre Company include A Dizzy Woman, I Do, I Do! in 1997 and What's A Life!? in 2000, as well as Forever Youth in 2001. Also in GreenRay Theatre, Lin, Mei-Hsiu took part in the Human Condition series from the second episode to the seventh one. She has also appeared in a number of productions with the Ping-Fong Acting Troupe, which had been held by Lee Kuo-Hsiu, including Taiping Tianguo in 1994 and The Half Mile of The Great Wall in 1995. Other notable performance includes Money Without Life in 2004 with the Spring Sun Performing Arts Troupe. In 2022, she appeared in the play Hero Action.

Lin has been active in Taiwanese television series including The Best of Times on TTV and as He Mu and in Swallow on Da Ai TV as Fan Mu in 2001. She played the role of Xia Meixiu in True Love on Ba Da in the same year. Later she appeared in several dramas such as You're My Destiny on TTV and Sanlih TV, where she played the role of Chen Linsishi/Guifei. Through these TV dramas, her portrayal of mother-liked and middle-aged woman has been rooted in Taiwanese culture.

== Awards and nominations ==
In 2003, Lin Mei-hsiu won a Golden Horse Award for Best Supporting Actress for her role in Black Dog is Coming. In 2014, she took home an award for Best Supporting Actress at the Taipei Film Festival for her role in Zone Pro Site. She was the recipient for the Golden Globes Awards for Best Actress in a TV MiniseriesYour Eyes, My Hands in 2011. The next year she won the Best Supporting Actress in the TV drama In Time with You.

Film Festival	Best Supporting Actress	Won		
2008	43rd Golden Bell Awards	Best Supporting Actress in a Television Series	Fated to Love You	Nominated
2010	45th Golden Bell Awards	Best Supporting Actress in a Television Series	Happy Together	Nominated
2011	46th Golden Bell Awards	Best Actress in a Miniseries or Television Film	Your Eyes, My Hands	Won
2012	47th Golden Bell Awards	Best Supporting Actress in a Television Series	In Time with You	Won
2013	50th Golden Horse Awards	Best Original Film Song	Zone Pro Site - "Jin Ma Bo Un"	Nominated
2013	50th Golden Horse Awards	Best Supporting Actress	To My Dear Granny	Nominated
2013	56th Asia-Pacific Film Festival	Best Supporting Actress	To My Dear Granny	Nominated
2014	16th Taipei Film Awards	Best Supporting Actress	Zone Pro Site	Won
2015	50th Golden Bell Awards	Best Host for a Travel Show	Taste of Home	Nominated
