= Kingone Wang =

Taiwanese actor, singer and host

- 王傳一
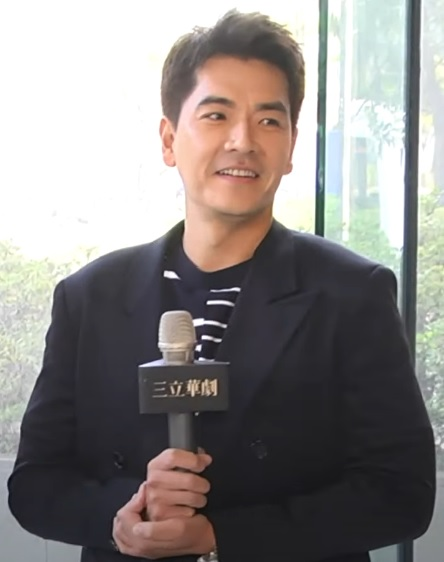
- Wang in March 2021
- Born: 5 May 1980 (age 46); Wanhua, Taipei, Taiwan
- Education: National Chiao Tung University
- Occupations: Actor, singer, host
- Years active: 2001–present
- Spouse: Lin Hsiao-wei (m. 2017)
- Children: 1
- Awards: 40th Golden Bell Awards; 2005 Evil Scorpion – Best Supporting Actor
- Musical career
- Genres: Mandopop
- Instruments: Vocals, guitar
- Labels: Ocean Butterflies Music (2006–present); Sony Music Taiwan (2001–2005)
- Formerly of: Comic Boyz

Kingone Wang (Chinese: 王傳一; pinyin: Wáng Chuányī; born 5 May 1980) is a Taiwanese actor, singer and host. He was part of the boy band Comic Boyz and winner of Taiwanese Golden Bell Awards for Best Supporting Actor. He is the alumni of both National Chiao Tung University and Chinese Culture University.

== Early life ==
On 5 May 1980, Wang was born in Taipei. He is the only child in his family. His given name "傳一" means "the one to inherit".

His father is a senior doctor in dermatological department. His mother died of cancer when he was only 17.

During his years at the Affiliated Senior High School of National Taiwan Normal University, Wang frequently topped the class; the school subsequently recommended him for admission to National Chiao Tung University.

== Career ==
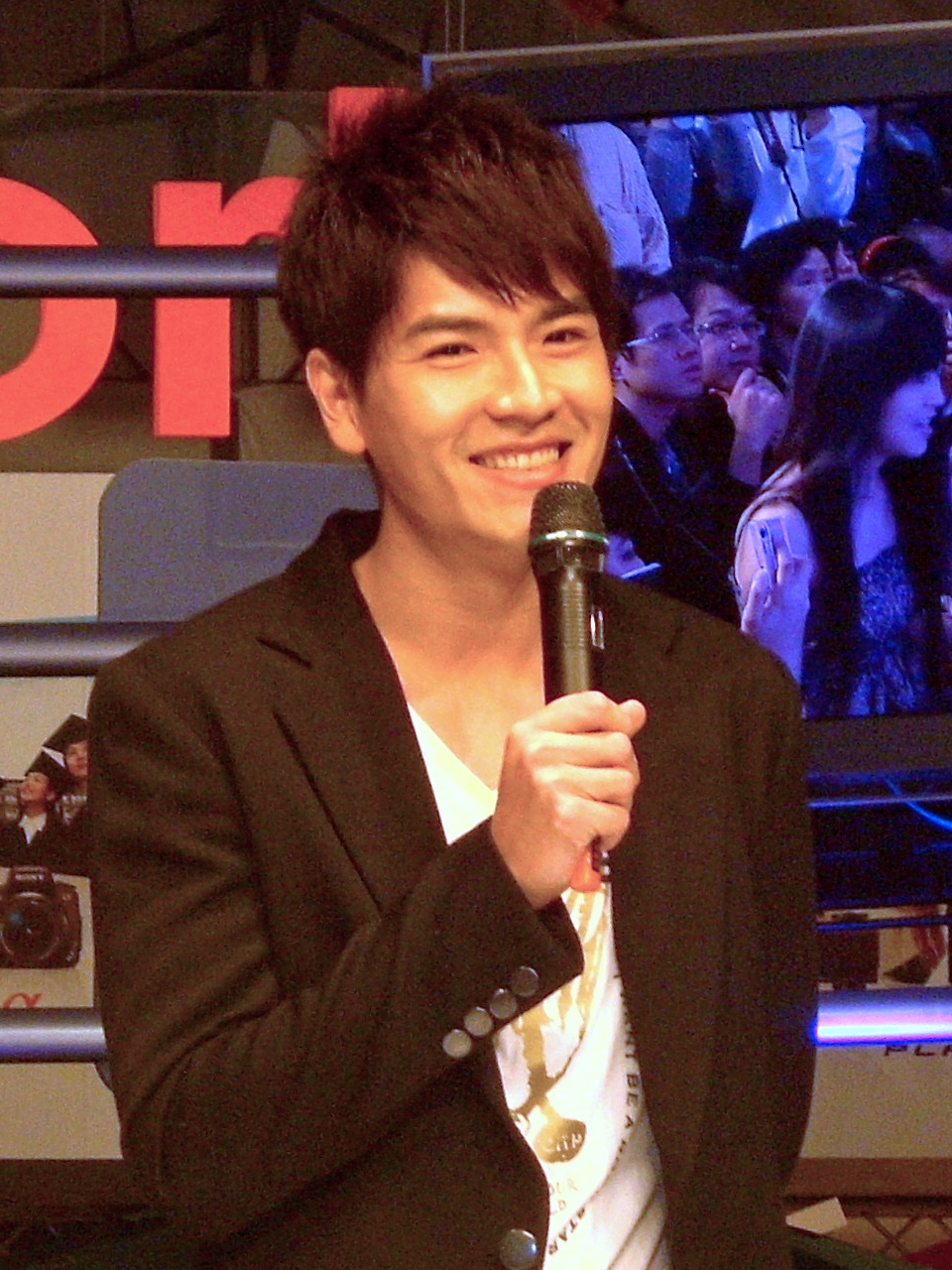
Wang at the 2008 Sony Fair

Wang began his media career in modeling and attracted public attention with his figure and looks. Many feel that Wang's attractive figure is a combination of the Hong Kong popstar Andy Lau and Taiwanese popstar Jay Chou. in 2002, Wang was signed by Sony Music (Taiwan) to form a 6-man boy band Comic Boyz (可米小子) where he was the leader of the group. They acted in several Taiwanese dramas and released 3 albums: Hey Hah! (可米小子), 2002; 青春紀念冊 2003; Goodbye 可米小子新歌+精選, 2005 before disbanding in 2005.

After Comic Boyz disbanded, Wang continued to pursue his career in the Taiwanese entertainment industry, hosting TV shows and playing supporting roles in TV dramas. In 2005, Wang played a supporting role in the drama Evil Scorpion (魔蠍) for which he won the 2005 Best Supporting Actor at the 40th Golden Bell Awards, Taiwan. He also starred alongside Rainie Yang and Mike He in Devil Beside You (惡魔在身邊) in 2005 and Why Why Love (換換愛) in 2007, where he played a sensitive university basketball team captain and a large shopping centre's CEO, respectively. Wang is currently signed by Ocean Butterflies Music Co Ltd, and released his first EP Love, KingOne (換換愛) on 14 August 2007.

In 2009, Kingone was nominated for the second time for Best Supporting Actor at the 44th Golden Bell Awards, Taiwan for his role as Gao Yi in Black & White.

== Personal life ==
Wang married Lin Hsiao-wei in November 2017 after two years of relationship. Together they have a daughter who was born in 2018.

Wang is able to speak English, Mandarin and Taiwanese Hokkien. He is currently completing Graduate degrees in both Civil Engineering at National Chiao Tung University and Philosophy at Chinese Culture University.

In his spare time, Wang likes music and sport, especially golf and darts.

== Filmography ==
=== Film ===
Year	English title	Original title	Role	Notes
2010	Love 50%	愛情折扣	Zhang Wen-kai	
2010	My Own Justice	愛情折扣 公視人生劇展- 再見全壘打	Lin Xin-yi	Television
2012	Penguin Fufu	企鵝夫婦	Fan Hsiao-jiang	
2014	Rite of Spring			
2016	Mole of Life	黑白	Zhang An-ping	
2017	The Detective Caught	全民情敵	Li Jie-ao	
2020	Bo Knows Love	我叫梁山伯	Liang Shan-bo	Television
2020	Prequel of the Monkey King	大聖前傳	Sun Wukong	
2022	S–Girl	科學少女	Liu Jia-qi	
2022	Ni gan bu gan?	你，敢不敢？－隔壁女兒的書包		Television

=== Television series ===
Year	English title	Original title	Role	Notes
		好美麗診所嘿哈	池珍東	
2002	Meteor Garden II	流星花園2	Secretary	Cameo
		偷偷愛上你		Cameo
2003	Love Storm	狂愛龍卷風		Cameo
2003	Spicy Hot Student	麻辣高校生	Comic Boyz member	
2003	Godfather in Pink	粉紅教父小甜甜	Idol group member	
2004	Mars	戰神MARS	Ling & Sheng's biological father	Cameo
2005	Evil Scorpion	魔蠍	Zhang Shu-wei	
2005	Starry Night	愛在星光燦爛時	Chuan-yi	
2005	Devil Beside You	惡魔在身邊	Shang Yuan-yi	
2005	Wind Chasers	追風少年	He Fei-li	
2006	Goku Dou High School'	極道學園	Chou Shao-qi	
2006	Silence	深情密碼	Huang Zhi-ye	
2006	My Son Is A Mob Boss	我的兒子是老大	Frank	
2007	Why Why Love	換換愛	Huo Yan	
2007	The Legend of Chu Liuxiang	楚留香傳奇	Zhongyuan Yidianhong	CCTV-8
2008	Wish to See You Again	這裡發現愛	Ma Yong-rui	
2009	Black & White	痞子英雄	Gao Yi	
2010	Scent of Love	就是要香戀	Xiang Zhi-yuan	
2011	Love You	醉後決定愛上你	Ren Yi-xiang	
2011	Next Heroes	真的漢子	Jingcai Ge	Next TV
2012	Yours Fatefully	孤男寡女	Soo Xiao-yi	
2012	Fondant Garden	翻糖花園	Yan Han-xiang	
2013	Happy 300 Days	遇見幸福300天	Qi Tian	
2014	Tie the Knot	妈咪的男朋友	Liu Zi-jun	
2015	Someone like you	聽見幸福	Fang Zhan-cheng	
2015	The Day I Lost You	失去你的那一天	Meng Zeming	
2015	Love or Spend	戀愛鄰距離	Pei Zheng-xi	
2018	Till We Meet Again	千年来说对不起	Zhao Yaojin	Wawa Pictures production
2018	Till We Meet Again – Prequel	千年来说对不起-前传	Sun Wukong	Toggle original series
2019	Goodbye My Princess	东宫	Li Chengye	Youku
2019	Brave to Love	愛情白皮書	Qiu Ting	Special appearance
2019	Sweet Family	美味滿閣	Wang Zi-yao	
2020	The Devil Punisher	天巡者	Siming Xingjun	Cameo
2021	Piggy's Counterattack	三隻小豬的逆襲	Lu Jin-zhou	
2021	The Memory Garden	如果花知道	Huang Jian-xiong	Cameo
2022	We Are Young, We Are Fighting	戰時我們正年少	Feng Mang	
TBA	The Attorney From Bachimen	八尺門的辯護人		
TBA	Love in a Fallen City	一身孤注掷温柔		

=== Hosting ===
- Azio TV Asia Entertainment Centre (weekend host)
- Azio TV Azio Music Expert (東風音樂通)
- Comic Boyz Adventure (惡童探險記)
- Eastern U-STAR Asia Popular New Artiste co-host (東風U-STAR亞洲新紅人選主持人之一)
- Magic Love Horoscope (星座愛情魔法)
- 2005 Golden Bell Awards, red carpet co-host

== Discography ==
=== Solo EP ===
Album info	Track listing
Love, KingOne (EP) (換換愛): Format: Extended Play (AVCD); Released: 14 August 2007; Label: Ocean Butterflies Music; Language: Mandarin; Genre: Mandopop	1. "Why Why Love" MV (換換愛 MV); 2. "Why Why Love" (換換愛); 3. "The World I Want" (我要的世界); 4. "Welcome to My Heart"

=== Soundtrack contributions ===
Album info	Track listing
Goku Dou High School Original TV Soundtrack (OST) (極道學園電視原聲帶): Format: Studio album (CD); Released: 5 October 2006; Label: Ocean Butterflies Music; Language: Mandarin; Genre: Mandopop	1. "Lovin' U" (Wang Kingone); 2. "極道戰役" (Wang Kingone+李偉豪+馬如龍+藤岡靛)

=== Comic Boyz albums ===
Album #	Album info	Track listing
1st	Hey Hah!! Comic Boyz: Released: 25 November 2002; Label: Sony Music Taiwan; Language: Mandarin; Format: Studio album (CD); Genre: Mandopop	1. "Hey!Hah!"; 2. "求愛復刻版" (Old School Love); 3. "超人心" (The Heart Of Superman); 4. "最重要的你" (The Most Important You); 5. "我忍住哭" (I Hold on My Tears); 6. "喜歡你" (Loving U); 7. "Blue Miracle"; 8. "Buddy"; 9. "相信" (Belief); 10. "青春無敵" (Forever Youth); 11. "Hey! Hah!" (Asia Remix); 12. "Hey! Hah!" (Euro Remix)
2nd	Youth Souvenir Book (青春紀念冊): Released: 29 December 2003; Label: Sony Music Taiwan; Language: Mandarin; Format: Studio album (CD); Genre: Mandopop	1. "Number 2"; 2. "青春紀念冊" (Youth Souvenir Book); 3. "紅蜻蜓" (Red Dragon Fly); 4. "花季" (Flower Season); 5. "他" (Him); 6. "Hold Me Close"; 7. "我討厭" (I Hate It); 8. "我的野蠻女友" (My Sassy Girlfriend); 9. "愛的入場劵" (Love Coupon); 10. "愛像什麼" (Love What)
3rd	Goodbye Comic Boyz (New + Best Selection) (Goodbye 可米小子 新歌+精選): Released: 21 January 2005; Label: Sony Music Taiwan; Language: Mandarin; Format: Studio album (CD); Genre: Mandopop	1. "愛情不用翻譯" – Starry Night (愛在星光燦爛時) ending theme (new); 2. "好奇無上限" – Starry Night (愛在星光燦爛時) opening theme (new); 3. "Hey!Hah!"; 4. "求愛復刻版" (Old School Love); 5. "紅蜻蜓" (Red Dragon Fly); 6. "我忍住哭" (I Hold on My Tears); 7. "花季" (Flower Season); 8. "超人心" (The Heart Of Superman); 9. "Number 2"; 10. "Hold Me Close"; 11. "青春無敵" (Forever Youth); 12. "喜歡你" (Loving U); 13. "我的野蠻女友" (My Sassy Girlfriend); 14. "青春紀念冊" (Youth Souvenir Book)

== Book ==
- Men's Talk (型男Talk): A book co-written by Wang and Matt Wu, men's talk around their lives, the world and philosophy. ISBN 986-127-750-1. Release date: 20 December 2006)
