= Xiaoguang =

- Poster
- Traditional Chinese: 曉光
- Simplified Chinese: 晓光
- Hanyu Pinyin: Xiǎoguāng
- Screenplay by: Wang Shaudi
- Directed by: Doze Niu
- Starring: Doze Niu; Tarcy Su; Lee Ching-mei; Chin Shih-chieh
- Music by: Liu Ssu-wei
- Country of origin: Taiwan
- Original languages: Mandarin; Taiwanese Hokkien

Production
- Producer: Doze Niu
- Cinematography: Lee Chih-chiang
- Editor: Chen Hsiao-ching
- Running time: 98 minutes
- Production company: E-Zen Hall Production

Original release
- Network: China Television
- Release: 2000

Xiaoguang is a 2000 Taiwanese television film directed and produced by Doze Niu, starring himself as Ma Xiaoguang, a formerly successful child actor who struggles to break into the acting world as an adult. The screenplay is by Wang Shao-di, who directed the 1996 film Accidental Legend in which Doze Niu starred in.

== Cast ==
- Doze Niu as Ma Xiaoguang
  - Zhang Xiaowen as Ma Xiaoguang (child)
- Tarcy Su as Li Yan, a celebrity singer-actress
- Lee Ching-mei as Xiuxia, Ma Xiaoguang's mother
- Chin Shih-chieh as Ma Xiaoguang's father
- Chu Zhong-heng as Ma Xiaoguang's best friend
- Li Hsing as Director Li
- Lang Tsu-yun as Weng Mingzhu, a talent agent
- Chung Chia-chen as Ma Xiaoguang's aunt

== Awards and nominations ==
#	Award	Category	Name	Result
35th	Golden Bell Awards	Best Miniseries or Television Film		Nominated
35th	Golden Bell Awards	Best Actor	Doze Niu	Nominated
35th	Golden Bell Awards	Best Supporting Actress	Lee Ching-mei	Won
