= 35th Golden Bell Awards =

- Date: October 6, 2000
- Site: Sun Yat-sen Memorial Hall, Taipei, Taiwan
- Hosted by: Chen Mei-feng
- Organized by: Government Information Office, Executive Yuan

Television coverage
- Network: Formosa Television

The 35th Golden Bell Awards (Mandarin:第35屆金鐘獎) was held on October 6, 2000 at the Sun Yat-sen Memorial Hall, Taipei, Taiwan. The ceremony was broadcast live by Formosa Television.

== Winners and nominees ==
Below is the list of winners and nominees for the main categories.

Program/Award	Winner	Network
Radio Broadcasting
Individual Awards
News program Award	劉敏娟 - "News Magazine"	Broadcasting Corporation of China
Pop music program award	TAN Zhi Yi, Ming - "Music New Paradise"	Central Broadcasting System
Non-pop music program award	Liu Baishan - "That day, I opened his diary"	PRT Broadcasting Limited
Children's Program Award	Wu Cuiwen - "Literary Lunch"	Cheng Sheng Broadcasting Corporation - Yunlin Taiwan
Education, science, culture program award	Fan Chin Hui - "Nature Notes"	National Education Radio
Social Services Program Award	Xie Meiying - "Nathan Well Valley - my home"	Asian Broadcasting Corporation
Talk show	Li Qiongfen - "Air Library"	Broadcasting Corporation of China - Taiwan Branch Taiwan
Individual Awards
News Interview Award	Liu Yi-hua, Koushi Jing, Feng Guoxiu, Lai Shu Zhen, Zhang Wenlu, 張文祿, 李河錫, 歐陽和 - "大地的傷口地震的省思系列報導"	Broadcasting Corporation of China - Taiwan and Taiwan
DJs Award	TAN Zhi Yi, Liu Guanyou - "New Paradise Music - Pop Music Hall"	Central Broadcasting System
Non-pop music show host award	Liubai Shan - "That day, I opened his diary"	PRT Broadcasting Corporation
Children's show host	邱佩轝 - "音樂開門之兒童床邊音樂故事"	PRT Broadcasting Corporation
Education, science, culture show host award	Fan Chin Hui - "Nature Notes"	National Education Radio
Social Services show host award	Lin Hsin-i, Linrong Qing, Chen Cheng Yuan - "Nathan Well Valley - My Home	Asian Broadcasting Corporation
Talk show host award	劉敏娟 - "News Magazine"	Broadcasting Corporation of China
Broadcast Technology Award	Li Ruomei, 午夜奇譚 - "Yongzheng Dynasty"	Broadcasting Corporation of China
Advertising Awards
Commercial Advertising Award	藝術小家咖啡館	public broadcasting Corporation
non-commercial Advertising Award	"Old Taiwan" series	Voice of Han
Programme Awards
Radio Events Award	Temporary Radio - Voice of Peace	Broadcasting Corporation of China - Taiwan
Radio Community Service Award	Wulai Township Project Hope	Voice of Han
Professional Channel Award	The police radio traffic network	Police Broadcasting Service
International Chinese Language Program Award	Chinese Heart Asian Love program	Central Broadcasting System
Special Award	Cui Xiaoping	
Research and Development Award	Cheng Guangqi Luochen Xin - "調頻廣播副載波系統應用暨全球衛星定位系統之校時裝置設計"	Voice of Han
Television Broadcasting
Programme Awards
News program Award	"民視異言堂"	FTV
Best Movie	誰在橋上寫字	PTS
Best Television Series	Once Upon A Time	PTS
Traditional drama program award	National Opera Exhibition - generals Spring	CTV
Variety Show Award	Super Sunday	CTS
Children's Program Award	Ke La Legend	PTS
UNESCO program award	作家身影系列—永遠的台北人--Pai Hsien-yung	International Digital Multimedia Inc.
Living Information Program Award	Medical Pioneers	Big Love Satellite TV
Talk Show Award	True Index	TVBS
Individual Awards
News show host award	Fangnian Hua - "TVBS-N晚間九整點--最前線"	TVBS
News Interview Award	Zhan Yiyi, Pan Zhifeng - "A River Runs Through a series of reports"	LTVBS
Variety show host award	Super Sunday host group - "Super Sunday"	CTV
Children's show host prize	Zhao Ziqiang - "Fruity Pie"	PTS
UNESCO Award presenters	Wei-Hsin Sun - "heading depths of the universe"	Order of the New Communication Co., Ltd.
Best Director	Chu Yu-ning - "誰在橋上寫字"	PTS
Best Directing for Non-Drama Programme	何湛然 - "wilderness voice - Life Movement"	Jutal Audiovisual Production Communications Limited
Best Directing for a Television Series	Chu Yu-ning, Zhang Youyu - "誰在橋上寫字"	PTS
Best Actor Award	Leon Dai - "濁水溪的契約"	PTS
Best Actress Award	Rene Liu - "千禧劇展--住在十字架裡的母親"	CTV
Best Supporting Actor Award	Lu Qi An - "誰在橋上寫字"	PTS
Best Supporting Actress Award	Lee Ching-mei- "Millennium Drama Exhibition / Xiaoguang"	CTV
Cinematography Award	Zhang Zhihong - "誰在橋上寫字"	PTS
Editing Award	誰在橋上寫字 - "dove"	treasure flower Communication Co., Ltd.
Sound Award	Wu Jiali - "Once Upon A Time"	PTS
Lighting Award	Liu Jingling - "General monument"	Xin Bao Communications Ltd
Art Director Award	Miss Chiu Yi - "Taiwanese writer Theater - Happiness"	FTV
Best singing show host award	Zeng Xin Mei, Chen Jing -"My Music Your Song"	GTV
Advertising Awards
Best Selling Advertising Awards	Sharp washing machine	Green frequency Fruit Co.
Enterprise-class Advertising awards	First Bank	Euro RSCG Inc.
Community-wide Advertising Awards	Tzu Chi general donation - Lihe Zhen article	Big Love Satellite TV
Research and Development Award	Xiao Yong - "master-slave network architecture and clustering technology applications: News editorial pieces automation program development plan"	TTV
