= 46th Golden Bell Awards =

- Date: October 21, 2011
- Site: Sun Yat-sen Memorial Hall, Taipei, Taiwan
- Hosted by: Matilda Tao
- Organized by: Bureau of Audiovisual and Music Industry Development

Television coverage
- Network: CTV

The 46th Golden Bell Awards (Mandarin:第46屆金鐘獎) was held on October 21, 2011 at Sun Yat-sen Memorial Hall in Taipei, Taiwan. The ceremony was broadcast live by CTV.

== Winners and nominees ==
Below is the list of winners and nominees for the main categories.

Program/Award	Winner	Network
Radio Broadcasting
Programme Awards
Non-popular music award	Marley Music Salon	HSP Broadcasting Corporation
Education and Culture Program Award	I love Teresa	Voice of Han - Taipei main station
Children's Program Award	Little Yam train	Kaohsiung Broadcasting Station
Youth Program Award	National Education Commission	Voice of Han - Taipei main station
Social Care Program Award	Soft heart human intelligence	National Education Radio
Art and Culture Program Award	Tonight I can read poetry	HSP Broadcasting Corporation
Comprehensive Program Award	Such as country club	National Police Agency, MOI
Community Program Award	Aboriginal tribe people	Eastern Broadcasting Corporation
Radio Drama Award	RTI Golden Theater	Central Broadcasting System
Drama Program Award	Obedient	National Police Agency, MOI
Individual Awards
DJ	Liuguan You, TAN Zhi Yi - Music MIT	Central Broadcasting System
Non-pop music show host award	Chen Xi - "Where Music Blogs"	Revival Radio
Education and Culture Award presenter	Ovid Tzeng, Su-Yen Lai - "Science for Everyone"	National Education Radio
Children's show host award	Linley [Lin Jinhui] - "小蕃薯列車"	Kaohsiung Broadcasting Station
Youth Award presenter	Xu Yan [Hsu Yu] - "National Education Commission"	Voice of Han - Taipei main station
Social Care Award presenter	Natalie Tso [Zhurui Juan] - "Newstalk entire world"	Central Broadcasting System
Art and Culture Award presenter	Fang Ping [Tian Liyun] - "Tonight I can read poetry"	HSP Broadcasting Corporation
Comprehensive Award presenter	阿國、琇如 - "如國俱樂部"	National Police Agency, MOI
Community Award presenter	季翔 (白繼祥) - "Listen soul singing"	Cheng Sheng Broadcasting Corporation - Yunlin
Planning and preparation award	Tian Liyun, Lee Ji Ang, Zhang Jingyi - "next hundred years - see the new Taiwan"	Hsinchu Broadcasting Corporation
Sound Award	Chen Wenbin - "RTI Golden Theater"	Central Broadcasting System
Advertising Awards
Best selling Advertising Award	觀音山金寶塔	Cinderella Music Productions Limited
Best Advertising award	Care and thank PSAs - "Love, self-evident" series	National Police Agency, MOI
Radio jingles Award	Yin Masahiro - "Taipei voice heard"	Taipei Broadcasting Station
Radio Marketing Innovation Award	就是I ASIA—亞洲影音帶著走	Asia Broadcasting Corporation
Professional Channel Award	Oldies professional channels	飛揚廣播股份有限公司
Research and Development Award	Cai Xuanhui - "radio hardware and software resources integration and implementation of innovative solutions: Kaohsiung MRT music station"	Kaohsiung Broadcasting Station
Television Broadcasting
Programme Awards
TV Series Award	Somewhere Over The Sky	Hakka TV
Mini-series/Movie Award	Days We Stared at the Sun	PTS
Educational and cultural program award	遙遠星球的孩子	PTS
Children program award	summer vacation butter play	PTS
Walking Program Award	World's No.1	GTV
Comprehensive Program Award	Man Qian world financial weekly	CTI
Variety Show Awards	Celebrity Imitated Show	CTI
Animation Program Award	kitten Barkley - Barkley The Cat	PTS
Individual Awards
TV Series Actor Award	Will Pan - Endless Love	CTS
TV Series Actress	Tien Hsin - Who's the One	TTV
TV Series supporting actor award	Li Luo - "艋舺燿輝"	CTV
TV Series supporting actress	Amanda Chu - "The Fierce Wife"	SETTV
Mini-series/Movie Actor award	Sean Huang - "Days We Stared at the Sun"	PTS
Mini-series/Movie Actress	Lin Mei-hsiu - "long love drama Big Love Show - Your Ryes; My Hands"	Big Love Satellite TV
Mini-series/Movie Actor Supporting Actor	Wu Jian - "Days We Stared at the Sun"	PTS
Mini-series/Movie Supporting Actress Award	Teresa Daley - "Days We Stared at the Sun"	PTS
TV Series Director Award	Hongzhi Yu - "Scent of Love"	CTV; GTV
Mini-series/Movie Director Award	喇外‧達賴 - "Lost horizon"	鐵漢堂國際娛樂有限公司
Non-drama Director Award	沈可尚, Lu Yuanqi - "Children From The Distant Planet"	PTS
TV Series Screenplay Award	Huang Yujia - "Somewhere Over The Sky"	Hakka TV
Mini-series/Movie Screenplay award	CHENG Yu-Chieh, 木二 - "Days We Stared at the Sun"	PTS
Children show host award	ZHONG Yi Qin - "out on one line"	Hakka TV
Itinerant show host award	Janet Hsieh - "mad exodus of Taiwan Special"	Singapore Suppliers Global documentary Ltd. Taiwan Branch
Comprehensive show host award	Zeng Guo Cheng, Hsia, Yu-chiao, 阿基師, James - "Stylish Man-The Chef"	庫立馬媒體科技股份有限公司
Variety show host award	Plungon, Hsieh Hsin Hao, Aaron Li - "Super Taste"	TVBS
Cinematography	Yu Jingping, Song Diansheng - "old friends studio"	PTS
Editing Award	Zhang Heng such as Lu Yuanqi, Huangguan Jun - "Children From The Distant Planet"	Fantasy Entertainment International, Inc.
Sound Award	Shi Jie Yong - "The Invaluable Treasure 1949"	PTS
Art and Design Award	Liu Fook - "The Invaluable Treasure 1949"	PTS
Marketing Advertising Awards
Program Marketing Award	The Fierce Wife	SETTV
Channel Advertising Awards	"If you want Fly Taiwan Free Tour Mind" public television image advertising	PTS
Special Award
OCEANOGRAPHY
