= 42nd Golden Bell Awards =

2007 Taiwanese television awards

- Date: 17 November 2007
- Site: Sun Yat-sen Memorial Hall, Taipei, Taiwan
- Hosted by: Kevin Tsai; Patty Hou
- Organized by: Bureau of Audiovisual and Music Industry Development

Television coverage
- Network: Azio TV

The 42nd Golden Bell Awards (Chinese: 第42屆金鐘獎) was held on 17 November 2007 at Sun Yat-sen Memorial Hall in Taipei, Taiwan. The ceremony was broadcast live by Azio TV.

== Winners and nominees ==
Below is the list of winners and nominees for the main categories.

Program/Award	Winner	Network
Radio Broadcasting
Programme Awards
Pop music program award	Taiwan salty and sour	National Education Radio - Taipei main station
Non-pop music program award	Listen Music	Radio caroling Foundation
Education News Program Award	Architecture Melody	Voice of Han - Taipei main station
Social Services Program Award	Corner welcomes the world	Broadcasting Corporation of China
Art and Culture Program Award	Communication Arts Communication Arts New Paradise ~ classics. Meet human treasures	Cheng Sheng Broadcasting Corporation
Comprehensive programs Award	Song of the South Life	Greenpeace Broadcasting Limited
Radio Drama Award	Taiwan Dream Land - Radio Theatre	Cheng Sheng Broadcasting Corporation
Unit Program Award	Open Hakka Sky	HSP Broadcasting Corporation
Community Service Program Award	寶桑文教週報之 - "Finding life forces"	National Education Radio - Taitung branch station
Local characteristics program award	Culture dessert City	Cheng Sheng Broadcasting Corporation
Individual Awards
DJ	Jinzhi Juan, Xu Zhe Wei, Koo in - doll SPECIAL	Voice of Taipei Broadcasting Corporation
VJ	Zhang Han Yang - "When the music comes knocking"	Positive sound FM radio stations broadcast Taipei
Education News presenter	Lv Mingshan [Susan] - "Architecture Melody"	Voice of Han - Taipei main station
Social Services show host award	Yang Yu-hsin - "corner Hin World"	Broadcasting Corporation of China
Art and Culture Award presenters	Chiang Hsun - "beauty contemplation. Chiang Hsun time"	HSP Broadcasting Corporation
Comprehensive show host award	Zhu Degang, Li true - "weekend big stage"	Central Broadcasting Foundation
Feature Screenplay Award	Wuzheng Shun Qi Xuan - "Memory Key"	Police Broadcasting Service
Sound Award	Jocelyn Wang Rong - "Hayat newspaper - with my peers"	National Education Radio - Kaohsiung Taiwan
Advertising Awards
Best Advertising Award	council of agriculture Fisheries Agency southward policy advocacy	Fisheries Agency, Council of Agriculture, Executive Yuan, Taiwan Fishery Radio
Service Award	reading, writing, happiness upgrade	Voice of Han - Taipei main station
Radio Marketing Innovation Award	一聲千金	City Broadcasting Corporation
Research and Development Award	Paul Chi, Wu Guoqin, You Wenli - "Digital and analog programs Autoplay System"	Fisheries Agency, Council of Agriculture Fisheries Taiwan Radio
Television Broadcasting
Programme Awards
TV series Program Award	Dangerous Mind	PTS
Traditional drama program Award	Tang Mei-yun Who is my Bride?	PTS
TV Marketing Award	The Unique Flavor	SETTV
Movie/Mini-series award	PTV drama Life Exhibition: Nyonya culture taste typical open studio	PTS
Educational and cultural programs Award	The new generation of observers, as the group II Communications Ltd	PTS
Comprehensive program award	Fun Taiwan rediscovery barley image transmission studio	CTV
Community Arts Program Award	China Great Experience	Eastern Broadcasting Corporation
Entertainment variety show	One Million Star	CTV
Singing variety show	Taiwan Spring Breeze	GTV
Individual Awards
TV series Actor Award	Huang He - "Dangerous Mind"	PTS
TV series Actress Award	Miss Ko - "Big Love Theatre - Beautiful Dawn"	Foundation Tzu Chi Foundation, dissemination of culture
TV series Supporting actor award	張嘉年(太保) - "cycads Bloom"	Foundation Tzu Chi Foundation, dissemination of culture
TV series Supporting Actress	Huang Xiangting - "Haflower"	Hakka TV
Movie/Mini-series actor	Bryan Chang - "Graduate Series - Fortunately, we are still here"	PTS
Movie/Mini-series actress award	Mo Aifang - "PTV drama Life Exhibition: Nyonya culture taste typical open studio"	PTS
Movie/Mini-series supporting actor award	Yucheng En - "十歲笛娜的願望"	八大電視股份有限公司
Movie/Mini-series Supporting Actress	Shen Shao Heng - "Call 223"	Foundation Tzu Chi Foundation, dissemination of culture
TV series Director Award	Tsai Yueh-Hsun - "The Hospital"	CTV
Movie/Mini-series Director Award	溫知儀 - "PTV drama Life Exhibition: Nyonya culture taste typical open studio"	PTS
Non-drama Director Award	Tang Xiangzhu - "Looking kuo - there! I like Chiang Wei"	International Film Limited (PTS)
TV series programs Screenplay Award	Miss Luo Ying, Pengsheng Qing - "The Hospital"	CTV
Movie/Mini-series Screenplay Award	Umin Boya - "十歲笛娜的願望 "	八大電視股份有限公司
Comprehensive show host award	Bryant (Abu) - "Adventure Wang"	SETTV
Community variety show host award	Hou Changming - "大特寫"	八大電視股份有限公司
Entertainment variety show host award	Matilda Tao - "One Million Star"	CTV
Singing variety show host award	Nana Chiang - "music to folk music sounds"	universal TV Corporation
Photography Awards	ZENG Xian-zhong, 劉芸后 - "PTV drama Life Exhibition: Wall figs Limited"	PTS
Editing Award	Liaoqing Song, Xiao Ruguan - "Looking kuo - there! I like Chiang Wei"	International Film Limited (PTS)
Sound Award	Xu Jinhui, Wu Bo Cang, Zhang L, 林東昇 - "saw Taiwan - Celebration Taiwan: degrees Ghost Month"	Eastern Broadcasting Corporation
Lighting Award	High Tsann, Huyu Hao - "PTV drama Life Exhibition: Wall figs Limited"	PTS
Art and Design Award	Liang Guoxiang, Li Liang, 成家嘉, Xu Congren - "打拚－台灣人民的歷史"	PTS
Channel Advertising Awards	Good punctuality	人間電視股份有限公司
Research Development Award	Zheng Honglin, Qiu Rong, Chen Shen-an, Lai Changlang, Jiang Guoliang - "Handheld TV (DVB-H) system platform to build research and development of engineering - Engineering Testing"	CTV
