= 36th Golden Bell Awards =

- Date: September 28, 2001
- Site: Sun Yat-sen Memorial Hall, Taipei, Taiwan
- Organized by: Government Information Office, Executive Yuan

Television coverage
- Network: TTV

The 36th Golden Bell Awards (Mandarin:第36屆金鐘獎) was held on September 28, 2001 at the Sun Yat-sen Memorial Hall, Taipei, Taiwan. The ceremony was broadcast live by TTV.

== Winners and nominees ==
Below is the list of winners and nominees for the main categories.

Program/Award	Winner	Network
Radio Broadcasting
Programme Awards
News program Award	Ilan Ilan	Cheng Sheng Broadcasting Corporation
Pop music program award	Blue Music Sea	Voice of Han
Non-pop music program award	卡吧嗨	Voice of Han
Children's Program Award	Kiwi	Broadcasting Corporation of China
UNESCO program award	Nature Notes	National Education Radio
Social Services Program Award	Scholarly community	Jesus Christ International, Inc.
Talk show	三點全露(law) ──生活法律通	Police Broadcasting Service
Individual Awards
News Interview Award	Wu Caizhang - "Flowers East Four Seasons"	National Education Radio - Hualien sub-station
DJs Award	Andy Wang - "Star Night language"	Lite Recreation COMMUNICATIONS LTD
VJ	Han Yang - "early sound"	Cheng Sheng Broadcasting Corporation
Children's show host	Xu Fei Xu - "magical book"	Voice of Han - Kaohsiung Taiwan
UNESCO Award presenters	Sui Hao Ping - "Listen Taiwanese singing"	Central Broadcasting System
Social Services show host award	Yue Huiling (Yue Ling) - "stranger"	Police Broadcasting Service
Talk show host award	Linzhi Li, 許淑惠 - "中午茶"	Broadcasting Corporation of China
Broadcast	Shixiu Fen - "art tour"	Revival Radio - Taipei Taiwan
Advertising Awards
Best selling Advertising Awards	Jardine Fleming Investment Trust - "That day I opened musician Diary"	PRT Broadcasting Corporation
Radio Advertising Award	"destroy Dengue - vanish"	Cheng Sheng Broadcasting Corporation
Radio Public Service Activities Award	"Young Love millennium in Hong Kong"	下港之聲放送頭廣播電台
International Chinese Language Program Award	Health Corner	Voice of America radio station
Research and Development Award	Zhang Zhixiong, Su Ge Wei - "radio transmitter remote automatic monitoring system"	Voice of Han
Television Broadcasting
Programme Awards
Best Movie	Treasonous Woman (逆女)	TTV
Best TV Series	Crouching Tiger	CTV
Traditional drama program award	河洛精緻歌子戲──彼岸花	Luo culture Utilities Company Limited
Children's Program Award	Fruity Pie	PTS
Education News Program Award	Grass	三立電視股份有限公司
Variety Show Award	Taiwan red star	TTV
Comedy entertainment program award	Invincible Saturday	CTV
Individual Awards
Best Movie Actor	Chiang Ting - "記住 忘了"	PTS
Best Movie Actress	Caijun Ru - "Treasonous Woman (逆女)"	TTV
Best Movie Supporting Actor	Li Kun - "Treasonous Woman (逆女)"	TTV
Best Movie Supporting Actress	Chen Jixia - "Life Drama Exhibition - Lost"	PTS
Best Movie Director	Ko I-Chen - "Treasonous Woman (逆女)"	TTV
Best Movie Screenplay Award	Zhang Shihao - "Mr .. COM's death"	CTV
Best TV Series actor award	Qiu Xinzhi - "笨小孩"	CTV
Best TV Series Actress Award	Tang Mei-yun - "北港香爐"	Eastern Broadcasting Co., Ltd.
Best TV Series Supporting Actor Award	JAD - "Mama wake up"	Big Love Satellite TV
Best TV Series Supporting Actress Award	Liu Hsiu-wen - "嫁妝一畚箕"	CTV
Best TV Series Director	Tsai Yueh-Hsun - "Meteor Garden"	CTS
Best TV Series Screenplay Award	Chen Jiayu - "小迷糊闖江湖"	TTV
Children's show host	Cao Qi Tai, Chung Hsin-Ling - "Dr. Cool"	佛光傳播事業股份有限公司
Education News presenter	Peng Zhangcan - "草地狀元"	SETTV
Variety show host award	Super Sunday host group - "Super Sunday"	CTV
Comedy entertainment show host award	Matilda Tao - "entertainment news"	United Yee Production Co. Ltd.
Non-drama director	Liu Song - "urban vision"	PTS
Cinematography Award	Yang Li-Chou - "Floating Women"	Big Love Satellite TV
Editing Award	Wu Baoyu - "three trump card"	CTV
Sound Award	Vera Chen Zheng, 不浪.尤幹先生 - "Maya's Rainbow"	Green Full Communication Co., Ltd.
Lighting Award	Wang Zhi - "MR .. COM's death"	CTV
Art Director Award	Zhang Shihao - "MR .. COM's death"	CTV
Advertising Awards
Best Selling Advertising Awards	"National 剋菌清冷氣 吃醋篇" "FamilyMart convenience store merchandise sale"	Dada Television Film Company
Television Advertising Award	"自在一點，你會看見生命的臉"	大乙傳播事業有限公司
Research and Development Award	Tony Chen, 東明正 - "television broadcast station" Wind and solar power supply system "in development"	CTV
