= The Hospital (Taiwanese TV series) =

2006 Taiwanese drama

- Poster
- Also known as: 白色巨塔 báisè jù tǎ The Great White Tower
- Genre: Romance; Medical drama
- Based on: The Hospital by Hou Wenyong
- Written by: Luo Ying Wu (吳洛纓)
- Directed by: Cai Yuexun (蔡岳勳)
- Starring: Jerry Yan; Leon Dai; Janine Chang; Chang Kuo-chu; Agnez Mo; Ng Man Tat; Tang Zhiping
- Opening theme: "你是我唯一的执着" [You Are My Only Persistence] by Jerry Yan
- Ending theme: "曾經太年輕" [Too Young] by Shadya (藍又時)
- Country of origin: Taiwan
- Original language: Mandarin
- No. of episodes: 39

Production
- Executive producer: In Xiaohui (于小慧)
- Production locations: Taipei, Taiwan
- Running time: 60 mins (Mondays to Fridays at 20:00)
- Production company: Yang Ming International Production

Original release
- Network: China Television (CTV)
- Release: 15 August – 6 October 2006

Related
- The Return of the Condor Heroes; The Young Warriors

The Hospital (Chinese: 白色巨塔; pinyin: báisè jù tǎ; lit. 'The Great White Tower') is a 2006 Taiwanese drama starring Jerry Yan, Leon Dai, Janine Chang, Chang Kuo-chu, Ng Man Tat, Tang Zhiping and Indonesian actress and singer Agnez Mo. It was produced by Yang Ming International Production (揚名國際影視) and directed by Cài Yuè Xun (Chinese: 蔡岳勳). The series comprises thirty-nine 60-minute episodes (including commercial time) and was broadcast on free-to-air China Television (CTV) (中視) from 15 August 2006 to 6 October 2006, Mondays to Fridays at 20:00.

The story of The Hospital is based on the 2000 Chinese novel of the same title by Taiwanese author Hou Wenyong (侯文詠). It depicts the power struggle and prestige in a national university-affiliated hospital in Taiwan, as well as the human relations within the community. Due to the resemblances in the title and story setting, Hou's novel is often compared alongside the Japanese novel Shiroi Kyotō, written by Toyoko Yamasaki. (Note: Although both stories deal extensively with power struggles and various abuses in the public research university hospital system, The Hospital spends more space on the personal relations of the irresolute protagonist amid various moral predicaments, whereas Yamasaki's Shiroi Kyotō climaxes with a lawsuit involving medication error committed by the ambitious protagonist and reflects more philosophically on the vocation of a medical practitioner against personal success.) Both works have been adapted into television series in Asia.

In 2007, the drama was nominated for eight awards at the 42nd Golden Bell Awards and won Best Director in a Television Series and Best Supporting Actor.

== Cast ==
=== Hospital staff ===
- Jerry Yan (言承旭) as Su Yihua (蘇怡華), M.D., (Note: Names of characters, as well as actors/actresses in a leading role, are shown in bold text in this list.) the male protagonist of the story, professor at the National United University School of Medicine (NUUSM; fictional) and surgeon at its affiliated hospital (聯大醫院, NUUH; fictional), takes no interest in the hospital's internal politics but eventually becomes a tool used by others to bring down his mentor, Tang Guotai
- Leon Dai (戴立忍) as Qiu Qingcheng (邱慶成), M.D., professor at the NUUSM and deputy director of the NUUH Surgery Department, sides with the peremptory Tang Guotai when Tang is in power but then joins Xu Daming to purge Tang's influence in the department after Tang's sudden stroke attack
- Janine Chang (張鈞甯) as Guan Xin (關欣), M.D., anesthesiologist at the NUUH and later director of the NUUH Anesthesia Department, Su Yihua's lover who eventually parts with him as she escapes from the power struggles in the hospital
- Chang Kuo-chu (張國柱) as Xu Daming (徐大明), M.D., professor at the NUUSM and director of the NUUH Department of Internal Medicine, arch rival to Tang Guotai and winner for the appointment of superintendent to the hospital, later father-in-law of Su Yihua
- Ng Man Tat (吳孟達) as Tang Guotai (唐國泰), M.D., professor at the NUUSM and director of the NUUH Surgery Department, teacher and tormentor of Su Yihua who suffers a stroke when he learns his loss in the bid for hospital superintendency to Xu Daming
- Tang Zhiping (唐治平) as Chen Kuan (陳寬), M.D., assistant professor at the NUUSM and surgeon at the NUUH, friend of Su Yihua who fails in his bid for associate professorship due to Tang Guotai's persecution and dies of stomach cancer shortly afterwards
- Zhang Fujian
- Huang Ruobai
- Chien Te-men
- Emma Ni
- Liu Renzo
- Jason Chang
- Tang Kehua
- Linda Liao
- Huang Zongyou
- Kelly Mi

=== Family members of the staff ===
- Josephine Blankstein (許安安) as Xu Cuifeng (徐翠鳳), daughter of Xu Daming who eventually marries Su Yihua
- Hsiu Chieh-kai (修杰楷) as Liao Qishu (廖其書), a clinic doctor who eventually marries Guan Xin
- Ding Ning
- Yang Wenwen
- Zhang Kui
- Shen Shihua
- Hong Cen
- Ke Shuqin
- Jian Peien
- Wu Yanxuan
- Qiu Naihua

=== Patients and their relations ===
- Saya as Liu Xinping (劉心萍), patient and admirer of Su Yihua whose hospitalization is highly publicized due to her identity as the President's daughter
- Liang Xiushen (梁修身) as the President (fictional character), Liu Xinping's father
- AGNEZ MO
- Deng An'ning
- Lin Liyang
- Shen Hairong
- Xiang Liwen
- Cai Mijie

=== Other roles ===
- Kris Phillips (費翔) as Juang Mingzhe (莊明哲), M.D., former professor at the NUUSM and surgeon at the NUUH, Kuan Xin's lover when she was a student
- Cheryl Yang (楊謹華) as Ma Yifen (馬懿芬), television journalist who develops an extramarital affair with Qiu Qingcheng
- Yao Daiwei
- Tender Huang
- Tao Chuanzheng

== Music ==
- Opening theme song: "你是我唯一的执着" (You Are My Only Persistence) by Jerry Yan - released on My Secret Lover
- End theme song "曾經太年輕" (Too Young) by Shadya (藍又時)

Album Information	Track Listing
The Hospital Original Soundtrack (白色巨塔 電視原聲帶): Artist: various artists; Released: 25 August 2006; Label: HIM International Music; Language: Mandarin; Genre: Mandopop; Format: Soundtrack album (CD)	1. "Never Say Goodbye" - Power Station; 2. "曾經太年輕" (Too Young) - Shadya Lan (藍又時) - ending theme 3. "妳要離開"一些時候 - Kaira Gong; 4. "跟我說愛我" - A-Sun; 5. "我答應你" - Power Station; 6. "開車" - A-Sun; 7. "起點" - instrumental 8. "甦醒" - instrumental 9. "聽見日光" - instrumental 10. "最初的守護" - instrumental 11. "時光之詩" - instrumental 12. "夜的遐想" - instrumental 13. "熟悉的聲音" - instrumental 14. "一個結束的開始" - instrumental 15. "漫長的旅行" - instrumental 16. "白色牢籠" - instrumental 17. "病榻邊緣" - instrumental 18. "我存在的位置" - instrumental 19. "隔岸觀火" - instrumental 20. "終點" - instrumental

== Books ==
- The Hospital Photobook / 白色巨塔寫真書 - ISBN 986-174-061-9

== International broadcasts ==
- Thailand: Channel 3 - 17 August 2007. It broadcast every Friday at 23:00.
- Japan: NHK satellite channel - October 2007. It was the first Taiwanese drama broadcast in Japan.
- Philippines: Studio 23 ABS-CBN's UHF Channel - 5 October 2009
- Indonesia: Indosiar - 2005–2006

== Awards and nominations ==
2007 - 42nd Golden Bell Awards (金鐘獎), Taiwan

- Nominated: The Hospital for Best Television Series
- Nominated: Leon Dai for Best Actor
- Nominated: Ng Man Tat (吳孟達) for Best Supporting Actor
- Awarded: Chang Kuo-chu (張國柱) for Best Supporting Actor (Note: Chang Kuo-chu was nominated for and incorrectly announced as the winner of the 2007 Best Supporting Actor at the 42nd Golden Bell Awards, hence both he and fellow actor are both listed as winners.)
- Nominated: Saya (張惠春) for Best Supporting Actress
- Nominated: Cheryl Yang (楊謹華) for Best Supporting Actress
- Nominated: 吳洛纓、彭盛青 for Best Writing for a Television Series
- Awarded: Cài Yuè Xun (Chinese: 蔡岳勳) for Best Director in a Television Series
