= 37th Golden Bell Awards =

- Date: October 4, 2002
- Site: Sun Yat-sen Memorial Hall, Taipei, Taiwan
- Organized by: Government Information Office, Executive Yuan

Television coverage
- Network: TTV

The 37th Golden Bell Awards (Mandarin:第37屆金鐘獎) was held on October 4, 2002 at the Sun Yat-sen Memorial Hall, Taipei, Taiwan. The ceremony was broadcast live by TTV.

== Winners and nominees ==
Below is the list of winners and nominees for the main categories.

Program/Award	Winner	Network
Radio Broadcasting
Programme Awards
Pop music program award	十八姑娘一朵花	Police Broadcasting Service
Non-pop music program award	Taiwan Music Tour	萬世國際股份有限公司
Children's Program Award	快樂小圈圈	Voice of Han - Taipei main station
Education News Program Award	Air Arts Museum	Cheng Sheng Broadcasting Corporation
Community Program Award	listen carefully Ilan	Cheng Sheng Broadcasting Corporation
Social Services Program Award	Happiness 100%	Voice of Han - Kaohsiung Taiwan
Variety Show Award	Beauty World	Broadcasting Corporation of China
Drama programs Award	Drama Grand View Garden	Voice of Han - Taipei main station
Individual Awards
DJ	陳裕 (Chen Ping) - "relaxed station"	Revival Radio - Taipei Taiwan
VJ	簡上仁 - "Taiwan Music Tour"	Broadcasting Corporation of China
Children's show host	Huangyu Guan - "Taiwanese-song"	Police Broadcasting Service
Education News presenter	邵文心 - "Literature Night"	Voice of Han - Taipei main station
Community Award presenters	Zou Yingying (Yingying) - "方圓萬里情"	Cheng Sheng Broadcasting Corporation
Social Services show host award	Hong Zhang, 潘美緣 (Tian Yu) - "Taiwan Good Hope Love"	Cheng Sheng Broadcasting Corporation
Variety show host award	Qin Wei - "beautiful world"	Broadcasting Corporation of China
Best Director	邵文心 - "Drama Grand View Garden"	
Sound Award	Moushan Zhong, Yue Fei - "Drama Grand View Garden - storm Pavilion loyal soul"	Voice of Han - Taipei main station
Best Compilation Award	Panning Dong - "Featured Theatre - Dreaming Xi'an customs emotion"	Broadcasting Corporation of China
Advertising Awards
Best selling Radio Advertisement	Nan Shan Life ─ patron articles	Cheng Sheng Broadcasting Corporation
Best Radio Advertising Award	"refuse second-hand smoke ─ smoking articles"	Police Broadcasting Service
Radio Events Awards	"flesh and blood, Jinsheng Love - Love Blood Donation"	Jinsheng Radio Inc.
Professional Channel Award	Education Channel	National Education Radio - Taipei main station
International Chinese Language Program Award	Sweet Paris	RFI Radio France Internationale
Research and Development Award	"Transmitter (HARRIS SW -100) pressure protection switch development and improvement"	Central Broadcasting System
Special Award	Zhao Qin (Hao Ming) - Lady	Broadcasting Corporation of China
Television Broadcasting
Programme Awards
Best Movie	illegal paradise	Wu Nien-jen image culture Utilities Company Limited (PTS)
Best Television Series	大愛劇場—BI YA SU NA別來無恙	Big Love Satellite TV
Traditional drama program award	National Opera Exhibition - opera - Underworld Dreams	CTV
Children's Program Award	Do not underestimate me	PTS
Education News Program Award	Collector Taiwan's	Eastern Huarong spread Utilities Company Limited
Singing musical variety show	Music big difference	Era Communications Corporation
Entertainment variety show award	The world is very wonderful	CTV
Individual Awards
Best Movie Actor Award	Leon Dai - "Moonlight"	PTS
Best Movie Actress Award	謝三嬌 (Xieyue Xia) - "illegal paradise"	PTS
Best Movie Supporting Actor Award	高振鵬 - "Big Love Theatre - human fraternity"	Big Love Satellite TV
Best Movie Supporting Actress Award	Huang Shuying - "Moonlight"	PTS
Best Movie Director Award	Yang Ya Zhe - "illegal paradise"	PTS
Best Movie Screenplay Award	Yang Ya Zhe - "illegal paradise"	PTS
TV Series Actor award	Shen Meng-Sheng - "virgin, martyr, uninhibited women"	CTV
TV Series Actress	Lily Tien - "大愛劇場--BI YA SU NA別來無恙"	Big Love Satellite TV
TV Series Supporting Actor Award	Liao Jun - "Taiwan Mambo - Goldwater Aunt's Story"	TTV
TV Series Supporting Actress Award	Yang Chieh-mei - "virgin, martyr, uninhibited women"	CTV
Best TV Series Director Award		PTS
TV Series Screenplay Award	Li Shunci - "virgin, martyr, uninhibited women"	CTV
Children's show host prize	Jennifer Shen - "Do not underestimate me,"	PTS
Education News presenter Award	Jin Xiuli - "Taiwan Naomi"	Eastern Huarong spread Utilities Company Limited
Singing musical variety show host award	Chris Hung, Liu Teng - "Taiwan red star"	GTV
Entertainment variety show host award	Dong Zhicheng - "Different World"	Internet Utilities Company Limited
Non-drama director Award	Vang seok - "Classic - sea salt"	Big Love Satellite TV
Cinematography Award	李學主 - "classic"	Big Love Satellite TV
Editing Award	喬慧中 - "brotherhood"	Ruifeng Communications Limited (FTV)
Sound Award	Zhou Zhen, CAO Yuan Feng, Liu Fuyuan - "dance melancholy"	Fu Xuan Communications Ltd (PTS)
Lighting Award	Caojun Jing - "trilogy"	PTS
Art Director Award	Chong Min Sheng, 楊證譯 - "moon disappeared"	PTS
Advertising Awards
Best Selling Advertising Awards	"Pan 2U prepaid KTV chapter"	McCann Erickson Inc.
Best Television Advertising Award	"give first aid article"	Big B Communications Ltd
Research and Development Award	林至星 - "Principles of digital terrestrial television broadcasting and business opportunities"	TTV
Special Award	Huang Chun-hsiung	TTV
