= 31st Golden Bell Awards =

1996 Taiwanese radio programming awards

- Date: 25 March 1996 (radio)
- Site: Sun Yat-sen Memorial Hall, Taipei, Taiwan
- Organized by: Government Information Office, Executive Yuan

Television coverage
- Network: TTV

The 31st Golden Bell Awards (Chinese: 第31屆金鐘獎) was held on 25 March 1996 at the Sun Yat-sen Memorial Hall in Taipei, Taiwan. The ceremony was broadcast by TTV.

== Winners ==
Program/Award	Winner	Network
Radio Broadcasting
Programme Awards
News program	Good Morning Taipei	Everyone FM radio stations
Depth news program	Nostalgia Report	Voice of Han - Penghu radio station
Public Forum program	News Magazine	Broadcasting Corporation of China
Classical music program	Music Feast	Police Broadcasting Service
Popular music	Taipei pop	正聲廣播公司
Children's Program	Little Smart house	Renaissance Radio Taipei Taiwan
Folk cultural program	唸歌做戲，鬧熱滾滾	Broadcasting Corporation of China
Living Arts Program	Chinese Vocal House	Voice of Han - Taipei Taiwan
Community education program	Qingping tune	Positive sound radio Kaohsiung Taiwan
Public service program	Love the way you and I"	Police Broadcasting Service
Community Service Program	community exchange station	Police Broadcasting Service - Hualien Taiwan
Variety show	China and teatime	Broadcasting Corporation of China
Drama program	Literary Bridge	Voice of Han - Taipei Taiwan
Foreign productions	Aha 10-1	Eddie and Communications
Advertising Awards
Best Radio Advertisement	Two-way media marketing image of the earth's resources ─ Air articles cherish	public broadcasting company
Best Selling Advertisement	KODAK CAMEO image capture life chapter	public broadcasting company
Individual Awards
News Interview	Qian Liying, 牟科港 - "China Tour"	Revival Radio - Taipei Taiwan
Best Writer	Zhaohao Ming (Zhao Qin) - "music style"	Broadcasting Corporation of China
Best Audio	Chenzi Ling - "Hualien nostalgia"	Broadcasting Corporation of China - Hualien Taiwan
Best Broadcast	Zhaohao Ming (Zhao Qin) - "Music Encyclopedia"	Broadcasting Corporation of China
Best Director	Ge David - "Midnight Qi Tan"	Broadcasting Corporation of China
Public information	"Destiny chapter"	Voice of Han
