= 33rd Golden Bell Awards =

- Date: 26 March 1998 (radio)
- Site: Sun Yat-sen Memorial Hall, Taipei, Taiwan
- Organized by: Government Information Office, Executive Yuan

Television coverage
- Network: CTS

The 33rd Golden Bell Awards (Chinese: 第33屆金鐘獎) was held on 26 March 1998 at the Sun Yat-sen Memorial Hall, Taipei, Taiwan. The ceremony was broadcast by CTS.

== Winners and nominees ==
The Golden Bell Awards ceremony was held at the Sun Yat-sen Memorial Hall on March 26, 1998 (19:00), and was broadcast by CTS on the same day at 21:00.

Below is the list of winners and nominees for the main categories.

Program/Award	Winner	Network
Radio Broadcasting
Programme Awards
News programs	Network News	Broadcasting Corporation of China
News Coverage program	Diamond Report - Typhoon Series	Broadcasting Corporation of China
Public Forum program	East Coast - niushan Battle	Police Broadcasting Service
Classical music program	Music Style - 中國古樂的傳承與發揚"	Broadcasting Corporation of China
Popular music	super music	Cheng Sheng Broadcasting Corporation
Children's Program	Mountain Bank	Cheng Sheng Broadcasting Corporation - Taitung Taiwan
Folk Arts Program	鑼聲響起	Cheng Sheng Broadcasting Corporation - FM station
Comprehensive information programs	台北什麼都有	Voice of Taipei Broadcasting Corporation
Social service programs	Nature Notes	Education Radio
Community Service Program	Taipei Sky	Cheng Sheng Broadcasting Corporation - FM stations broadcasting company in Taipei
Variety show	女人有約－查某人俱樂部	Broadcasting Corporation of China
Drama programs	Opera Spring - Zhong Kui	Voice of Han
Foreign productions	Morning's footsteps - Taiwan, Japan and the two national holidays and festivals	New Grid Communications Limited
Advertising Awards
Best Radio Advertising	KISS ˙ RADIO environmental image of the forest campaign chapter	public broadcasting company
Best selling Radio Advertisement	Philips small appliances ad campaign	public broadcasting company
Individual Awards
News Interview	Chenya Hong - "Broadcast Interchange"	Voice of Han
Program Planning	Hsu Yu (Xu Yan) - "National Education Committee"	Voice of Han
Best Audio	Moushan Zhong - "Opera Spring - Zhong Kui"	Voice of Han
Best Broadcast	Shixiu Fen - "World Music"	Revival Radio - Taipei, Taiwan
Best Drama Director	Shao Wenfeng - "Opera Spring - Zhong Kui"	Voice of Han
Public information	blind flute piece reprise	PRT Broadcasting Corporation
Radio Events Awards	"Caring for transportation, cherish life"	Police Broadcasting Service
Engineering Award	賴坤助, 邱文偉 - "Network Management and radio programs broadcast control automation design"	Voice of Han Broadcasting Station
