= 29th Golden Bell Awards =

1994 Taiwanese radio programming awards

- Date: 26 March 1994 (radio)
- Site: Sun Yat-sen Memorial Hall, Taipei, Taiwan
- Organized by: Government Information Office, Executive Yuan

Television coverage
- Network: China Television (CTV)

The 29th Golden Bell Awards (Chinese: 第29屆金鐘獎) was held on 26 March 1994 at the Sun Yat-sen Memorial Hall in Taipei, Taiwan. The ceremony was broadcast by China Television (CTV).

== Winners ==
Program/Award	Winner	Network
Radio Broadcasting
Educational and cultural program award	two-way bridge - the arts world, then setting	Broadcasting Corporation of China
Children's Program Award	Kiwi	Broadcasting Corporation of China
Award for public service programs	Thursday Live	PRS Taipei Taiwan
Educational and cultural show host award	Meishao Wen - "literary bridge"	Voice of Han - Taipei, Taiwan
Children's show host	Lu Zhengyi - "Rainbow World"	Voice of Han - Taipei, Taiwan
Public Service Award host:	Qin Li Fang (Chin Ching) - "Thursday Live"	PRS Taipei Taiwan
News program Award	News Silhouette	Cheng Sheng Broadcasting Corporation - Taipei, Taiwan
News show host award	Zouhui Lan - "press Silhouette"	Cheng Sheng Broadcasting Corporation - Taipei, Taiwan
News Interview Award	Mei-Fong Wu - "press Square Feature Story (Creek through the heart phoenix sad)"	PRS Kaohsiung Taiwan
Best Radio Advertising Award	孝順父母 - "給父母的愛要捨得"	文己國際企業
Best Selling Radio Advertisement	"Landscape Sound - 貝多芬的遺憾"	Cheng Sheng Broadcasting Corporation
Drama Series	宋轅田 - "午夜奇譚傳奇劇場（空墳奇案）"	Broadcasting Corporation of China
Program compilation Award	CHAN Chiu-ming - "Literary Night"	Voice of Han - Taipei, Taiwan
Dubbing Award	Moushan Zhong - "literary bridge"	Voice of Han - Taipei, Taiwan
Best Director	Ge David - "Midnight Qi Tan Zhuanqi Theater (broken dreams)"	Broadcasting Corporation of China
Music Program Award	Fengming Band	Fengming Company
DJ	Huang Xinli - "Chinese Vocal House"	Han Sheng Taipei Taiwan
Variety Show Award	music	Broadcasting Corporation of China
Variety show host award	Tsai Chin - "High Noon"	Broadcasting Corporation of China
Engineering Award	蕭文合、許錦海 蕭全林	Broadcasting Corporation of China
Special Award (Silver)	Luo Lan	
