= 39th Golden Bell Awards =

- Date: November 26, 2004
- Site: Sun Yat-sen Memorial Hall, Taipei, Taiwan
- Hosted by: Kevin Tsai; Dee Hsu
- Organized by: Government Information Office, Executive Yuan

Television coverage
- Network: EBC

The 39th Golden Bell Awards (Mandarin:第39屆金鐘獎) was held on November 26, 2004, at the Sun Yat-sen Memorial Hall, Taipei, Taiwan. The ceremony was broadcast live by EBC.

== Winners and nominees ==
Below is the list of winners and nominees for the main categories.

Program/Award	Winner	Network
Radio Broadcasting
Programme Awards
Pop music program award	Taipei Jazz night	PRT Broadcasting Corporation
Non-pop music program award	Saturday happy to say	Voice of Han - Taipei main station
Children's Program Award	Music Doodle country	PRT Broadcasting Corporation
Youth Program Award	National Education Commission	Voice of Han - Taipei main station
Education News Program Award	Philharmonic Front	PRT Broadcasting Corporation
Regional Service Program Award	PRS prime time - to hear the voice of Taiwan	Police Broadcasting Service
Traditional Arts Program Award	Rapper Broadway	Central Broadcasting System
Folk Culture Program Award	Voice of Han cultural centers	Voice of Han - Taipei main station
Individual Awards
DJ	Blue Zu Wei - "Movie forefront"	PRT Broadcasting Corporation
Non-pop music show host award	Meishao Wen - "Saturday happy to say"	Voice of Han - Taipei main station
Children's show host award	邱佩轝 - "音樂開門之兒童床邊音樂故事"	PRT Broadcasting Corporation
Junior show host award	Hsu Yu (Xu Yan) - National Education Commission	Voice of Han - Taipei main station
Education News presenter	彭廣林 - What is the music	PRT Broadcasting Corporation
Regional Service Award presenters	梁明達 - "These people and those people"	Cheng Sheng Broadcasting Corporation
Folk culture show host award	Wang Yuren - "Taiwan salty and sour"	National Education Radio - Taipei main station
Best Director	Shao Wen Xin - "Echo Theatre"	Voice of Han - Taipei main station
Best Audio	Dave Hsia - "Taiwan reprise"	PRT Broadcasting Corporation
Best Compilation	Linzong Qing - "Music Jungle"	Taipei FM sound broadcasting station
Advertising Awards
Best Selling Advertising award	Mother's Day Series image advertising - "全能外婆笨媽媽、另類未婚媽媽、子母蝦情書"	PRT Broadcasting Corporation
Best Advertising award	Radio image advertising - "好人好事都在警廣"	Police Broadcasting Service
Regional Service Award		Voice of Han - Taipei main station
Professional Channel Award		PRT Broadcasting Corporation
Research and Development Award	Li Wenyi - "Central Broadcasting Fanliao sub-station broadcasting capabilities to enhance the case"	Central Broadcasting System
Television Broadcasting
Programme Awards
Drama program	dinner	PTS
Traditional drama programs Award	Kun - "Palace of Eternal Youth"	PTS
Year's most popular drama programs Awards	The Rose	TTV
TV marketing year Award	The Outsiders	GTV
Children program award	下課花路米	PTS
Education News Program Award	Century Women	PTS
Singing Music Program Award	My music, your song (Liu Fu-chu, Tseng Hsin-mei	GTV
Variety Show Award	Variety large collection	COMMUNICATIONS LTD
Individual Awards
Drama Actor Award	張晨光 - "middle of the day"	Ruifeng Communication Co., Ltd.
Drama actress	Wanfang - "cold fronts"	Paddy Film Workshop Co Ltd
Supporting Actor Award	Zhu-lu Hao - "trilogy continued song"	Green Full Communication Co., Ltd.
Supporting Actress Award	Lin Jiali - "Love Theatre - Quartet"	Big Love Satellite TV
Director Award	王啟在 - "二隻魚，游啊游上岸"	Guan Integrated Marketing Communication Co., Ltd.
Screenplay Award	Zhengfen Fen - "Mobile ghosts"	Yi Fang Communication Enterprise Co., Ltd.
Non-directed drama Award	王船舷 - "great cultural Inheritance ─ Hwang"	PTS
Children show host award	Shen Chunhua- "Do not look down on me"	PTS
Education News presenter	Lin Chao Zhang - "Adventure King"	SETTV
DJ	Peng Zhangcan, Chiang Shu-na - "Gold Nightclub"	SETTV
Variety show host award	Fei, Huang Pin Yuan - "Variety Big Brother"	頤合製作有限公司
技術獎	Quartet	Big Love Satellite TV
Photography	Wang Zhaozhong	Big Love Satellite TV
Cinematography	Wu Baoyu	Big Love Satellite TV
Sound	Hong Yun Hui; Wu Jiali	Big Love Satellite TV
Lighting	Song Wei	Big Love Satellite TV
Art Director	Tommy Ao; Bing Kai Fei	Big Love Satellite TV
Advertising Awards
Best selling Advertising Award	Unified Mizuho milk: Mega Farm articles	Eastern Huarong spread Utilities Company Limited
Best Advertising Award	Encore for their fuel of life: Zhang Liao Feng articles	PTS
Research and Development Award	侯銘罡、楊國宏 / 數位無線電視《服務資訊》 及《電子節目表》 之中文系統研發	FTV
