= 40th Golden Bell Awards =

- Date: November 12, 2005
- Site: Taipei County Multi Purpose Hall, Taipei County, Taiwan
- Hosted by: Chang Fei; Lin Chi-ling
- Organized by: Government Information Office, Executive Yuan

Television coverage
- Network: EBC

The 40th Golden Bell Awards (Chinese: 第40屆金鐘獎) was held on November 12, 2005 at the Taipei County Multi Purpose Hall, Taipei County, Taiwan. The ceremony was broadcast live by EBC.

== Winners and nominees ==
Below is the list of winners and nominees for the main categories.

Program/Award	Winner	Network
Radio Broadcasting
Pop music program award	Music MIT	Central Broadcasting System
DJ	Music is close to us	刘珮君 Political Warfare Department of Defense Corps Penghu radio station Voice of Han
Comprehensive program award	Baby Magic Show	Police Broadcasting Service
Comprehensive show host award	Zhang Weibin (Zhang Jing), Wu Chang (Toni) - "Baby Magic show"	Police Broadcasting Service
Non-pop music program award	Southern Music City	Cheng Sheng Broadcasting Corporation - Kaohsiung
Non-pop music show host award	Wang Yihui (Lin Wo) - "Ya Yin circulation - music to incense"	Political Warfare Department of Defense Corps Kaohsiung Taiwan Voice of Han
Education News Program Award	Beauty in Tainan	Political Warfare Department of Defense Corps Tainan Taiwan Voice of Han
Education News presenter Award	Cai Shuhui - "Soul Song"(brow)	Police Broadcasting Service
Social Services Program Award	真心看世界	Foundation Tzu Chi Foundation, dissemination of culture
Social Services show host award	Sophie Chen Yan - "Taiwan's Chi truth"	Cheng Sheng Broadcasting Corporation
Service Award	照顧偏遠的教育電台	National Education Radio - Hualien sub-station
Professional Channel Award	Campus specialty channel	National Education Radio - Taipei main station
Art and Culture Program Award	Taiwan Heart, country love - Listen to the beauty of Taiwan Local Acura	Education Radio Taipei, Taiwan
Art and Culture Award presenters	America's contemplation	Chiang Hsun HSP Broadcasting Limited
Screenplay Award	Ye Zhihua - "Echo Theatre - Our Story"	Political Warfare Department of Defense Corps Radio Voice of Han
Radio Drama Award	Sunday drama	Revival Radio
Best selling Advertising Award	Gin Kindergarten - last good articles	Volkswagen Broadcasting Limited
Best Advertising Award	交通安全宣導-家有豆豆系列廣告	Police Broadcasting Service
Radio Marketing Creativity Award	Political Warfare Department of Defense Corps	Voice of Han
Best Community Service Program Award	Hakka love	Cheng Sheng Broadcasting Corporation
Best local characteristics program award	Liu Jin Shiguang	Kaohsiung Broadcasting Station
Research and Development Award	動電話監控成音傳輸暨發射系統	鄭明祈 行政院農業委員會漁業署臺灣區漁業廣播電臺
Special Award	Lu Guangyu	Central Broadcasting System
Television Broadcasting
Best Movie	我的臭小孩	Raintree Pictures Ltd.
Best TV Series Award	Waves	FTV
Movie Director	人生劇展-請登入．線實	徐漢強 氧氣電影有限公司
Movie Screenplay	愛絲希雅的夢中夢	Tzu-Ping Lin Eastern Broadcasting Corporation
TV Series Screenplay	王詞仰、柯淑卿 - "Waves"	FTV
Best Movie Actor	Fan Guangyao - "villain"	Image strategy forefront Ltd.
Best Movie Supporting Actor	Kingone Wang - "Evil Scorpion"	Eastern Broadcasting Company
Best Movie Actress	Fang Wenlin - "Evil Scorpion"	Eastern Broadcasting Company
Best Movie Supporting Actress	Zhao Meiling - "Look At Me"	超人睿奇製作有限公司
Best TV Series Actor	Tuo Zong Hua - "Love's Lone Flower"	CTV
Best TV Series Supporting Actor	Jack Kao - "Love's Lone Flower"	CTV
Best TV Series Actress Award	Wang Xuan - "A Story of Soldiers"	PTS
Best TV Series Supporting Actress Award	高蓮鳳(高玉珊)- "Big Love Theatre: Love to come back"	Big Love Satellite TV
Traditional drama program Award	"The Peony Pavilion"	PTS
Education News Program Award	Sweet lies	愛達普生影像製作行銷傳播股份有限公司
Education News show host award	Zhan Yiyi - "step by step, discover new Taiwanese"	TVBS
Singing music program Award	Fei Yu-ching music	CTI
Variety Show Award	全民大悶鍋	CTI
DJ	費玉清 - "Fei Yu-ching music"	CTI
Variety show host award	Kevin Tsai, Dee Shu - "Kangxi Lai Le"	CTI
TV marketing year Award	Love's Lone Flower	CTV
Channel Advertising Awards	television image Suite	Videoland networks Inc.
Non-directed drama Award	Li Lifang - "Super Monopoly: Lucky major combat"	TTV
Cinematography	Caizheng Tai, Wang Zhaozhong - "Waves"	FTV
Editing Award	DU Qi - "Love's Lone Flower"	CTV
Sound Award	Xiao-xia, CHEN Rou Zheng, Wu Jiali - "Love's Lone Flower"	CTV
Lighting Award	Deng Ji Xuan, Zhou Zhixin - "Waves"	FTV
Art Director Award	青蘋果公司美術組 - "Waves"	FTV
Research and Development Award	Jianming, Li Jianxin, Yan Zhi - "Da Ai TV Digital Lab"	慈濟傳播文化志業基金會
Year's most popular drama program Award	God of War	可米瑞智國際藝能有限公司
