= 45th Golden Bell Awards =

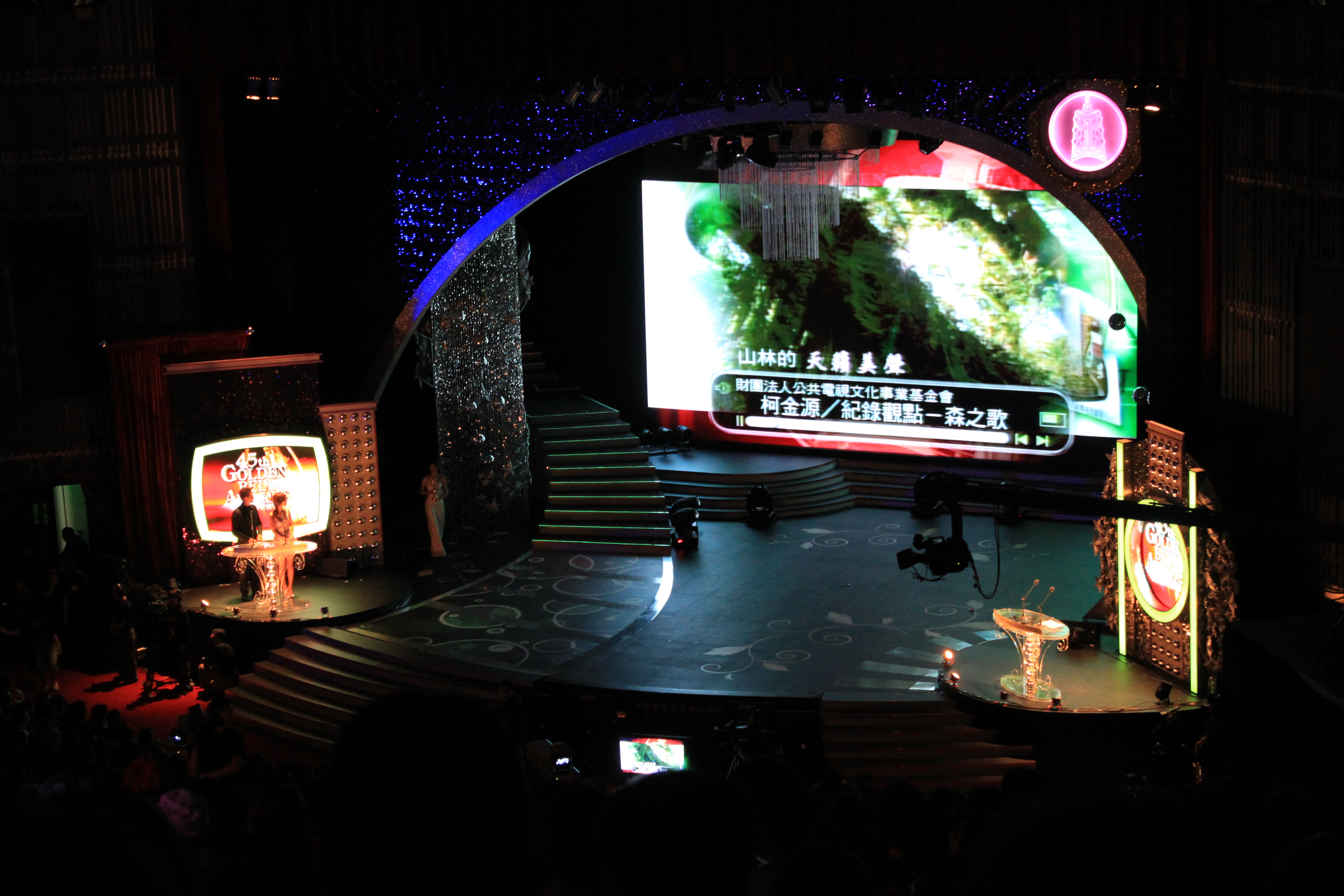
- The main stage of the 45th Annual TV Golden Bell Awards.
- Date: October 22, 2010
- Site: Sun Yat-sen Memorial Hall, Taipei, Taiwan
- Hosted by: Sam Tseng; Fang Fang-fang
- Organized by: Bureau of Audiovisual and Music Industry Development

Television coverage
- Network: TTV

The 45th Golden Bell Awards (Mandarin:第45屆金鐘獎) was held on October 22, 2010 at Sun Yat-sen Memorial Hall in Taipei, Taiwan. The ceremony was broadcast live by TTV.

== Winners and nominees ==
Below is the list of winners and nominees for the main categories.

Program/Award	Winner	Network
Radio Broadcasting
Programme Awards
Popular music awards	Music Infinity	Voice of Han
Non-popular music awards	When the music comes knocking	Cheng Sheng Broadcasting Corporation
Education and Culture Program Award	PDA-life mountain country Notepad	National Education Radio
Children Program Award	Little Yam train	Kaohsiung Broadcasting Station
Social Care Program Award	Earth folk songs	Cheng Sheng Broadcasting Corporation
Art and Culture Program Award	Nothing in the world Hakka Heart	Voice of Han
Comprehensive Program Award	Such as country club	Police Broadcasting Service
Community Program Award	Brave New World	Cheng Sheng Broadcasting Corporation
Radio Drama Award	Sunday radio	Revival Radio
Drama Program Award	Beautiful call - go find a good sound in the ground	Police Broadcasting Service
Individual Awards
DJ	Chen Ping - "Recall song"	Revival Radio
Non-pop music show host award	Zhang Han Yang - "When the music comes knocking"	Cheng Sheng Broadcasting Corporation
Education and Culture Award presenters	Han Liang Lu - "Creative Taipei roaming"	Labour Education Foundation, Taipei Radio Foundation
Children show host award	Little June sister [Shixian Qin] - "Woo miles uproar treasure hunting team"	National Education Radio
Social Care Award presenters	梁明達 - "these people and those people"	Cheng Sheng Broadcasting Corporation
Art and Culture Award presenter	Chen Duanhui - "World Dream Hall"	National Education Radio
Comprehensive Award presenter	阿國、琇如 - "as country club"	Police Broadcasting Service
Community Award presenter	排灣小蔡【蔡文祥】、阿美姞荷【祝素蘭】 - "Flintstones"	National Education Radio
Planning and preparation Award	袁永興、雷洛、書子、張倩華 - "Star Midnight Field"	Police Broadcasting Service
Sound Award	阿國、琇如、齊軒 - "星空子夜場"	Police Broadcasting Service
Advertising Awards
Best selling Advertising Award	Charity glasses - seven in the morning papers	city Broadcasting Corporation
Best advertising award	Road traffic safety propaganda on the "celebrity ad campaign"	Police Broadcasting Service
Radio jingles Award	917 together	Taipei pop music radio station
Radio Marketing Innovation Award	Amateur Chime	Taipei pop music radio station
Professional Channel Award	Humanities Radio	HSP Broadcasting Corporation
Television Broadcasting
Programme Awards
TV Series Award	Big Love Theatre - Brotherhood Moonlight	Big Love Satellite TV
Mini-series/Movie Award	Hakka TV Cinema - living from the sea	Hakka TV
Educational and cultural program award	Stunning Taiwan - conservation Chi	tip Photography Arts Co., Ltd.
Children Program Award	class Hua Road rice	PTS
Walking Program Award	Fun Taiwan	Singapore Suppliers Global documentary Ltd. Taiwan Branch
Comprehensive program award	Man Sin World Weekly	CTI
Variety Show Award	The Million Dollars Primary School	TTV
Animation Program Award	Little Sun	PTS
Individual Awards
TV Series Actor Award	Wu Zheng Di - "Big Love Theatre - Brotherhood Moonlight"	Big Love Satellite TV
TV Series Actress	Rainie Yang - Hi My Sweetheart	CTS
TV Series supporting actress	Franchesca - "Big Love Theatre - green lawn"	Big Love Satellite TV
TV Series Supporting actor award	Wu Jian - "Hakka Theater - The Kite Soaring"	Hakka TV
Mini-series/Movie actor award	Tang Chuan - "Hakka TV Cinema - living from the sea"	Hakka TV
Mini-series/Movie actress	Mei Chao Lin - "remember our love"	three Carpenter Film Co., Ltd.
Mini-series/Movie Supporting Actress	Liu Yi - "PTV drama Life Exhibition - My dad is a rogue"	Oxygen Film Co., Ltd.
Mini-series/Movie Supporting Actor Award	Wang Zheng Wei - "PTV drama Life Exhibition - My dad is a rogue"	Oxygen Film Co., Ltd.
TV Series Award	Chen Wei-ling - "Year of the Rain"	PTS
Mini-series/Movie director Award	Chu Yu-ning - "PTV drama Life Exhibition - My dad is a rogue"	Oxygen Film Co., Ltd.
Non-drama director Award	Ke Jinyuan - "record view - Sen Song"	PTS
TV Series Screenplay Award	Lu Shi Yuan, Lin Xinhui, Wu Weijun, Lin Chunhua - "Hakka Theater - pull paper Harrier hand"	Hakka TV
Mini-series/Movie Screenplay Award	Dingdao Xiang - "Hakka TV Cinema - living from the sea"	Hakka TV
Children show host award	香蕉哥哥【林掄元】 - "YOYO little champion"	Eastern Broadcasting Corporation
Itinerant show host award	Ni Zaijun - "world first, etc."	GTV
Comprehensive show host award	Yolanda Pong - "Pang Diao knocked on the door"	Singapore Suppliers Global documentary Ltd. Taiwan Branch
Variety show host award	Chu Ko Liang, Rene Hou - "gentlemen club"	FTV
Cinematography Award	Li Ming - "remember our love"	three Carpenter Film Co., Ltd.
Editing Award	Linzi Xian - "Hakka Theater - pull paper Harrier hand"	Hakka TV
Sound Award	史擷詠 - "watched one thousand nine hundred forty-nine - Lung Ying-tai exploration"	SETTV
Art and Design Award	Wu Ruo Yun - "see paradise"	影一製作所股份有限公司
Marketing Advertising Awards
Program Marketing Award	home eight thousand li - black-faced spoonbill	PTS
Channel Advertising Awards	"Year of the Rain" campaign	PTS
Special Award
Yeh Ming-hsun
