= 47th Golden Bell Awards =

2012 Taiwanese media awards

- Date: October 26, 2012
- Site: Sun Yat-sen Memorial Hall, Taipei, Taiwan
- Hosted by: Sam Tseng; Janet Hsieh
- Organized by: Bureau of Audiovisual and Music Industry Development

Television coverage
- Network: CTS

The 47th Golden Bell Awards (Mandarin:第47屆金鐘獎) was held on October 26, 2012 at Sun Yat-sen Memorial Hall in Taipei, Taiwan. The ceremony was broadcast live by CTS.

== Winners and nominees ==
Below is the list of winners and nominees for the main categories.

Program/Award	Winner	Network
Radio Broadcasting
Programme Awards
Popular music awards	Memory Key	National Police Agency Police Radio Station Taipei main station
Non-popular music award	Hill and in conversation: good listen Hakka	Universal Broadcasting Corporation
Education and Culture Program Award	Section Creative Labs	Voice of Han - Taipei main station
Children's Program Award	Sunshine small sprouts	National Police Agency Police Radio Station Taipei main station
Youth Program Award	Junior NPO	Cheng Sheng Broadcasting Corporation - Taipei FM radio stations
Social Care Program Award	Warm courier	National Education Radio
Art and Culture Program Award	Taiwan, salty and sour	National Education Radio
Community Program Award	天下一家親	Kaohsiung Broadcasting Station
Radio Drama Award	Would Theater - Taipei Literature Award	Taipei Broadcasting Station
Drama Award	大夥房下我的歌	HSP Broadcasting Corporation
Individual Awards
DJ Award	阿國, 琇如 - "In ancient Cabaret"	National Police Agency Police Radio Station Taipei Taiwan
Non-pop music show host award	Hao Ping Sui - "World Music Tour"	Radio Corporation Miaoli justice
Education and Culture Award presenter	宋銘【宋修聖】, 邵文心 - "香榭大道"	Voice of Han - Taipei main station
Children's show host award	Shixian Qin, Chen Zhenghan, 小摩斯姐 - "Everyone is a big star"	National Education Radio
Youth Award presenter	蕭曼屏 - "Junior Science Weekly"	National Education Radio
Social Care Award presenter	燕柔【陳燕柔】 - "Warm courier"	National Education Radio
Art and Culture Award presenter	Chen Duanhui - "World Dream Concert"	National Education Radio
Comprehensive Award presenter	Wang Yiming [Wang Tengmao], Zhang Wenling - "台灣答嘴鼓"	Taiwan Industrial Co., sound broadcasting
Community Award presenter	Pan Guozheng, Hong Huiguan - "Love Hsinchu"	HSP Broadcasting Corporation
Planning and preparation Award	安達【黃裕庭】, 采琦【金玉琦】 - "Music Map"	National Police Agency Police Radio Station Yilan Taiwan
Sound Award	Arthur [Chenguan Ming], Chen Chun - "Fantasy Island"	Kaohsiung Broadcasting Station
Advertising Awards
Best selling Advertising Award	WuFeng University of Technology - the grass articles	Cheng Sheng Broadcasting Corporation - Chiayi
Best Advertising award	The human voice, to serve for the purpose!	Central Broadcasting System
Radio jingles Award	Taiwan version of the new opera sound jingles	Taiwan New Voice Radio Inc.
Radio Marketing Innovation Award	"@ Blessings from around the world to see Taiwan," International Marketing Case	Central Broadcasting System
Professional Channel Award	Professional Radio Technology Humanities	HSP Broadcasting Corporation
Research and Development Award	Chenguan Ming - "Radio cloud strategy and implementation"	Kaohsiung Broadcasting Station
Television Broadcasting
Programme Awards
TV series Program Award	In Time with You	FTV; GTV
Mini-series/Movie Award	Debbie's happy life	崗華影視傳播有限公司
Education and Culture Program Award	Finally island - Taiwan's defense war 1950–1955	CTI
Scientific Program Award	Taiwan Entomological stunning one hundred	Living Water cultural undertakings Ltd.
Children Program Award	Little Science	TITV
Walking Program Award	Inn good taste	Hakka TV
Comprehensive Program Award	誰來晚餐3 1	PTS
Variety Award	超級模王大道	CTV
Animation Program Award	卡滋幫	PTS
Individual Awards
TV series Actor Award	Bolin Chen - "In Time with You"	FTV; GTV
TV series Actress Award	Ariel Lin - "In Time with You"	FTV; GTV
TV series Supporting Actor Award	Jiaxiao Guo - "Hakka Theater - A stupid girl"	Contents Digital Film Production Ltd
TV series Supporting Actress Award	Lin Mei-hsiu - "In Time with You"	FTV; GTV
Mini-series/Movie actor award	Chen Zhu l - "Wild Lotus"	Videoland networks Inc.
Mini-series/Movie actress	Jade Chou - "Debbie's happy life"	Videoland
Mini-series/Movie Supporting Actor award	Xi Xiang - "PTV drama Life Exhibition - Street Rhapsody"	Duck Films Limited
Mini-series/Movie Supporting Actress	Lai Xiao Yi - "Long love drama Big Love Show - Daddy Come"	Humanities Foundation Tzu Chi Foundation propagation
TV series Director Award	Chu Yu-ning (Winnie Chu) - "In Time with You"	FTV; GTV
Mini-series/Movie Director Award	Chen Yu Jie - "PTV drama student exhibition - thief"	Xin En Video Utilities Company Limited
Non-Drama director Award	Tang Zhenyu - "Loving the Golden Gate - off Fan"	PTS
TV series Screenplay Award	Mag Hsu - "In Time with You"	FTV; GTV
Mini-series/Movie Screenplay Award	Caiyi Fen, Zhu Jialin - "PTV drama Life Exhibition - The Princess and the Prince"	Shadow Tong International Ltd.
Children show host award	小兵【薛紀綱】, Wang Xianghan, Hong Chenying - "Hua Road meter class"	PTS
Itinerant show host award	Wufong - "Playing off Wufong"	SETTV
Comprehensive Award presenter	王曉書, Chen Kang Chen Lian Qiao - "Listen"	PTS
Variety show host award	澎恰恰, Hsu Hsiao - "Super Nightclub"	SETTV
Photography Awards	Weijie - "Baby Taiwan Series: ninety-nine Honey Buzzard"	PTS
Editing Award	Chen Xiaodong, Zheng Zhiliang, Jiang Yi-Ting - "Lai and go along Grand Tour"	Hakka TV
Sound Award	Shi Min Jie, 鄭志良, Zhou Zhen - "Jilin moonlight"	Gang Chinese Media Ltd.
Art and Design Award	Wu Ruo Yun - "PTV drama Life Show - married, do not get married"	British Virgin Islands Star City entertainment quotient, Taiwan Branch
Light Award	Xu Shiming - "Debbie's happy life"	Videoland
Marketing Advertising Awards
Marketing Awards Program	In Time with You	FTV; GTV
Channel Advertising Award	感謝祖宗十八代	Videoland networks Inc.
Special Award
Chang Mei-yao, Fu Pei-mei
