= Voice of Han =

Voice of Han 漢聲廣播電台
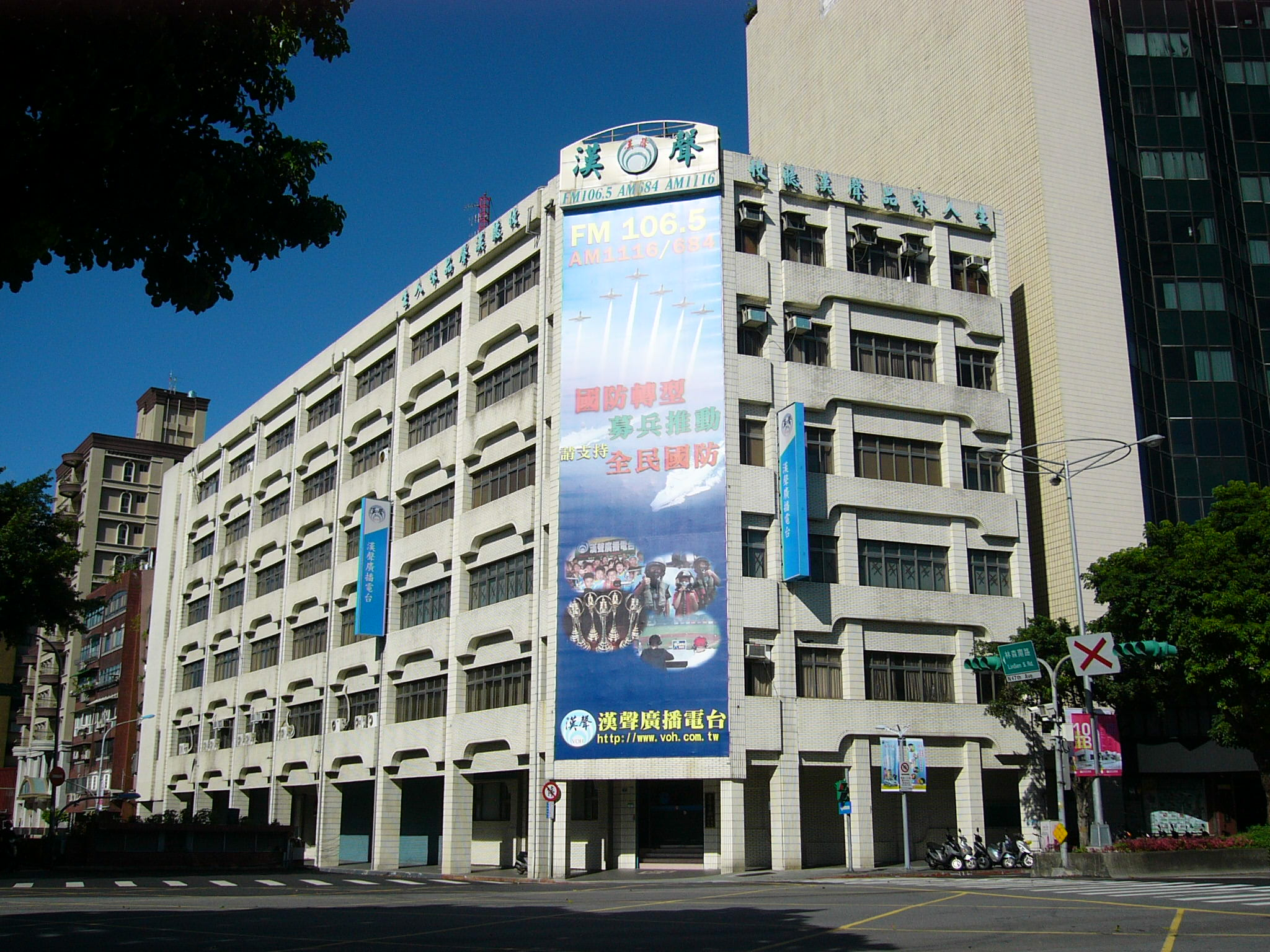
- Taiwan
- Broadcast area: Taiwan
- Branding: VOH

Ownership
- Owner: Ministry of National Defense

History
- Founded: 1942
- Former names: Military Radio

Technical information
- Transmitter coordinates: 25°2′14.46″N 121°31′16.91″E

Links
- Website: voh.com.tw

Voice of Han Broadcasting Station (Chinese: 漢聲廣播電台; pinyin: hànshēng guǎngbō diàntái) also known as Voice of Han Chinese Broadcasting Station was founded in 1942 by the Ministry of National Defense. It is headquartered on Xinyi Road in the Zhongzheng District of Taipei, Taiwan.

== History ==
1942, Voice of Han Radio was located in mainland China and originally called Military Radio.

1949, the military radio station moved to Taiwan when the Kuomintang retreated following the Chinese Civil War.

1988, the military radio station was renamed to "Voice of Han" and launched more extensive coverage which offered listeners radio programs to listeners nationwide.

2002, on the 60th anniversary celebration of the radio station, the president of the Republic of China, Chen Shui-bian, broadcast a speech on Voice of Han calling for a communication bride between the two sides of the Taiwan Strait.

2010, Voice of Han Broadcasting in Kinmen added another frequency coverage, including Xiamen, which is located in mainland China.

== Frequency ==
=== FM ===
- Northern: FM 106.5 MHz (Hsinchu, Taoyuan, Taipei and Keelung)
- Central: FM 104.5 MHz (Hsinchu, Taichung, Nantou)
- Chang Southwest Region: FM 101.3 MHz (Changhua, Yunlin, Chiayi, Tainan)
- Kaohsiung-Pingtung area: FM 107.3 MHz (Kaohsiung, Pingtung)
- Taitung: FM 105.3 MHz
- Hualien: FM 104.5 MHz
- Yuli: FM 107.3 MHz
- Ilan broadcast station: FM 106.5 MHz
- Kinmen relay station: FM 107.3 MHz

=== AM ===
- Taipei: AM 684/1116 kHz (600kW)
- Taichung: AM 1287 kHz
- Taoyuan: AM 693/936 kHz
- Yunlin: AM 1089 kHz
- Tainan: AM 693 kHz
- Pingtung: AM 1332 kHz
- Hualien: AM 1359/792 kHz
- Ilan: AM 1116 kHz
- Penghu: AM 1269/846 kHz

=== Shortwave and Mediumwave ===
The Voice of Han also broadcasts propaganda programs to mainland China on shortwave and mediumwave frequencies under the callsign "Voice of Guanghua" (光華之聲). Major programs include: Taiwan New Paradise, Music, Guanghua News, Guanghua Talk Forum, Culture and Education Filling Station, Two sides of the Taiwan Strait, Freedom Scene, Literature Bridge, Taiwan Strait Flyover, and Lookout Tower.

- Mainland China: 801 kHz, 846 kHz, 711 kHz, 981 kHz, 9745 kHz, 6105 kHz (250 kW)

== See also ==
- Media of Taiwan
- Radio Taiwan International
- Propaganda in the Republic of China
  - Fu Hsing Broadcasting Station
- Cross-Strait war of propaganda
  - China National Radio
  - Voice of the Strait
