= The Gamer =

South Korean webtoon

더 게이머 RR: Deo geimeo MR: Tŏ keimŏ
- Genre: Action, adventure, fantasy
- Author: Sung Sang-Young
- Illustrator: Sang-Ah
- Publisher: Naver WEBTOON
- English publisher: WEBTOON
- Magazine: Naver WEBTOON
- Original run: 5 September 2013 – July 2024

The Gamer (Korean: 더 게이머) is a South Korean webtoon hosted by Naver WEBTOON. The webtoon is loosely influenced by fantasy RPGs, Dungeons & Dragons but set in contemporary South Korea. Once the main protagonist, Han Jihan, notices a dialogue box in front of him like in a video game, he recognizes that he has become a video game character, and supernatural events start happening.

== Summary ==
Han Ji-Han was a normal high school student who developed a special ability that allowed him to treat the world around him as a game called 'The Gamer'. He noticed that by leveling up, he could increase his stats and improve his body and mind, among other things. The day after noticing that he can also increase his stats through training (he studied to increase his Intelligence), he accidentally slipped into a combat area for those who have a link to the Abyss, the hidden world of their own. He witnessed a battle between Kwon Si-Yeon and Hwan Seong-Gon, getting involved in it as well. He was approached by Kwon Si-Yeon, who questioned him on his identity.

Han Ji-Han began to realize that he needed to train to be sure that he would be safe if he got caught up in a fight again, so he trained his fighting capability with blunt objects (he uses a baseball bat). On his way home, he accidentally slips into another combat area, having to fight his way through zombies which he later finds out were amassed souls that Hwan Seong-Gon was collecting. He then realizes that he needs to talk to his friend, Shin Seon-Il. Ji-Han assumes that Seon-Il is part of this world due to his level being much higher than everyone else around him, and his assumption proves correct when Seon-Il threatens him due to him not knowing that Ji-Han has become part of this world.

The story goes on, with Han Ji-Han deciding to stay in the world of the abyss, putting him in many dangerous situations as he grows stronger to protect himself and those around him.

== Characters ==
=== Han Ji-han ===
The G#m#r.

=== Shin Seon-Il ===
Shin Seon-Il (신선일; Sinseon-il) is Han Ji-Han's childhood friend and attends the same high school as him. He is the first to discover Ji-Han's new 'Gamer ability', and also introduces Ji-Han to the Cheonnbumoon clan. Sun-Il was initially a little stronger than Ji-Han in terms of 'levels'.

=== Kwon Si-Yeon ===
Kwon Si-Yeon (권시연; Gwonsiyeon) is a female high school student who transferred into 2nd year class 8. She is also an ability user and hails from the Yeonhonmoon clan, the clan who normally opposes but is currently allied with Cheonbonmoon.

=== Hwan Seong-Ah ===
Hwan Seong-Ah (환성아; Hwanseong-a) Hwan Seong-Gon's daughter and also a transfer student at Ji-Han's high school a while after Si-Yeon's transfer. She becomes close to Ji-Han, who tries to cure her of a strange illness, with the help of his newly learned healing ability.

=== Yujin Kim ===
Yujin Kim, first introduced as the president of Han Ji-Han's class, was a normal human girl. After being sucked into the Great Labyrinth Era (A Protected Space), she is aided by Han Ji-Han and learns of the Abyss. Through exposure to Han Ji-Han's ability, she gains an affinity for magic and eventually decides to continue to develop her skills as a magic user.

== Chapter & episode list ==
Chapter	Episodes	Title
1	1-4	The Quest Above My Head
2	5-8	Time to Train
3	9-11	I Levelled Up
4	12-14	Shout My Name!
5	15-16	I Need More Skills!
6	17-19	Let's Find a Party
7	20-22	Get into Gear
8	23-24	Wise Decisions Require Knowledge
9	25-28	Only Through Effort Will You Gain the Fortitude to Walk Down Your Own Path

The chapter notion was abolished as of episode 29. The episodes are currently grouped into seven seasons.

No.	Episodes	Title
1	1-86	The Gamer - Season 1
2	87-123	The Gamer - Season 2
3	124-195	The Gamer - Season 3
4	196-349	The Gamer - Season 4
5	350-431	The Gamer - Season 5
6	432-466	The Gamer - Season 6
7	467-510	The Gamer - Season 7

== English translations ==
As Naver Corporation started making web content globally available in 2014, many webtoons, including The Gamer, got official English-language translations. Hankook Ilbo noted The Gamer as an example of a webtoon that introduces Korean culture to English-speaking audiences. Together with Tower of God and Girls of the Wild's, The Gamer is among the most popular official English-translated webtoons as of 2018 (Next to Tales of Demons And Gods overall).
