= Ivy Shao =

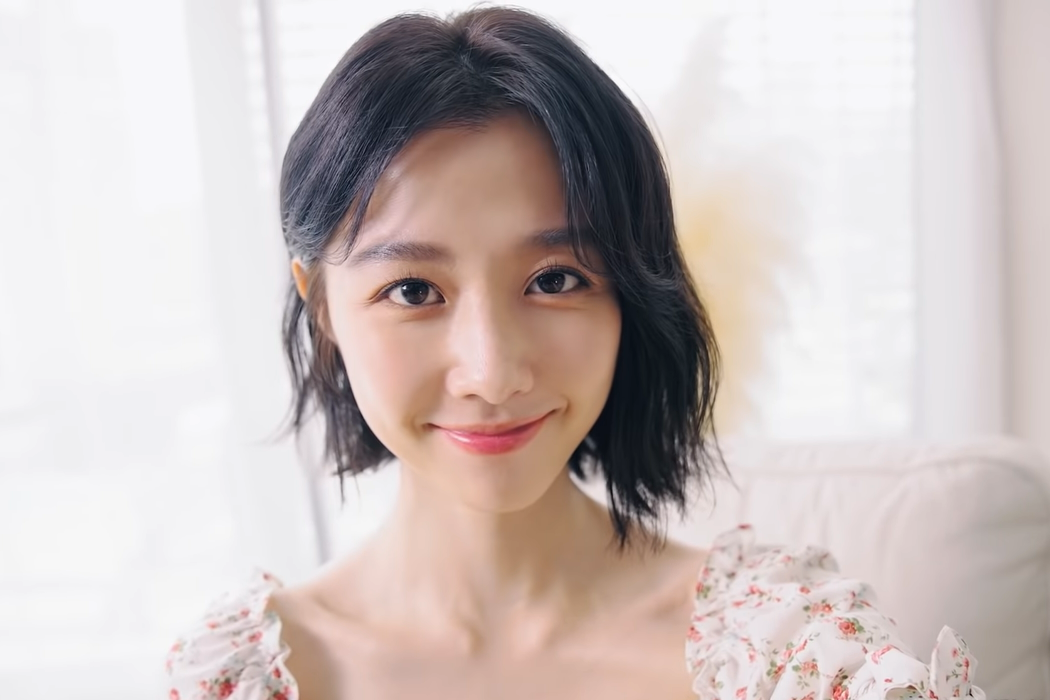
- Shao in 2021
- Born: 21 September 1989 (age 36); Kaohsiung, Taiwan
- Education: Fortune Institute of Technology
- Occupations: Actress; singer; model
- Years active: 2010–present

Chinese name
- Traditional Chinese: 邵雨薇
Transcriptions
Standard Mandarin
- Hanyu Pinyin: Shào Yǔwēi
- Musical career
- Also known as: Shao Yuwei

Ivy Shao (Chinese: 邵雨薇; pinyin: Shào Yǔ Wēi) is a Taiwanese actress, singer and model. She is best known for her leading role in the 2016 hit drama, Back to 1989. Since then, she has also starred in The Perfect Match with Wu Kang-jen and Ben Wu in 2017.

== Career ==
=== 2008–2010: Early beginnings ===
In 2008, she appeared on variety show, Guess, and gained fame. She then debuted in 2010 with the stage name Meng Meng as the spokesperson for the video game, "Meng Meng Online", and became a fixed cast on the variety show, Crazy God.

=== 2011–2015: Start of her acting career ===
Shao received her first acting role in drama Skip Beat. She then went on to have supporting roles in several dramas, such as A Hint of You, Fabulous 30, Love at Second Sight, When I See You Again and Beautiful Secret.

=== 2016–2017: Breakout role in Back to 1989, The Perfect Match ===
Her first breakthrough in the industry was when she received her first lead role in 2016 hit drama, Back to 1989 with Marcus Chang. The drama was the highest rated drama in recent years and was massively popular. She then followed up the drama with another leading role in 2017's The Perfect Match, co-starring with Wu Kang-jen.

=== 2018–present: Foray into Mainland China and release of debut album, Drizzle ===
In 2018, Shao appeared in a mainland Chinese drama, HBS's Sweet Combat. She also played the lead role in EBC's Love & π, co-starring with Ben Wu. She then appeared in CSIC 2, playing the main lead in the second arc of the story.

In 2019, Shao also starred in the movies Stand By Me and Deep Evil, and appeared as a guest star in The 9th Precinct. In the same year, she released her debut album, Drizzle.

Shao starred in Netflix and SETTV collaboration, The Devil Punisher alongside Mike He.

Shao also starred in Disney + Hotstar and SETTV's Frozen Heart and Kissed by the Rain alongside Mario Maurer.

== Personal life ==
Shao went public with her relationship with The Perfect Match co-star, Wu Kang-jen in November 2020. They had previously dated for a year in 2018 before getting back together.

== Filmography ==
=== Television ===
Year	Title	Role	Network	Notes
2011	Skip Beat	Gongxi's colleague	FTV	Cameo
2012	Confucius	Liang Jin Jin	CTV	
2013	A Hint of You	You Zhen Zhen	SETTV	
2013	The M Riders 5	Ma Ya	EBC Yoyo	
2014	Fabulous 30	Wu Yi Le	SETTV	
2014	Love at Second Sight	Tan Xiao Min	HBS	
2015	When I See You Again	Hu Yong Qing	SETTV	
2015	Beautiful Secret	Jiang Mei Yan	HBS	
2016	Back to 1989	Ye Zhen Zhen	SETTV	
2017	The Perfect Match	Wei Fen Qing	SETTV	
2018	Sweet Combat	Song Xiao Mi	Hunan TV	
2018	Love & π	Zhao Yuan Ma	TTV; EBC	
2019	CSIC 2	Bei Yi Xuan	CTV	
2020	The Devil Punisher	Meng Po / Meng Xin-yu / Xiao-bing	SETTV	
2020	Futmalls.com	Bai Yong Xin	Youku, Netflix	
2021	More than Blue: The Series	An Yi-Chi	Netflix	
2023	Venus on Mars	Zhu Wei Na	CJ EMN	
2024	Trade War	Lin Xue Yu	FTV	
2026	Frozen Heart	Hei Chi	SETTV	
TBA	Fired Up	Lao Shi Xia	HBO	
TBA	Doctor Love	Xiang Shai Mano	GTV	

=== Film ===
Year	Title	Role	Notes
2011	Whispers in the Reality	Zhi Xin	
2015	First of May	Zhang Huai Wen	
2016	The Tenants Downstairs	Chang Ying-ru	
2017	My Gift	Zhang Xiao-yu	Telemovie
2019	Deep Evil	Han Xue-ning	
2019	The 9th Precinct	MIB agent	Guest star, appeared in credits
2019	Stand By Me	Liang Bo-he	
2023	Lost in Perfection	Li-mei	
2023	Hello Ghost	Yu Hsiao-yin	
2024	Pigsy	Xiaojing	Voice

=== Web drama ===
Year	Title	Role	Notes
2015	Mr Bodyguard	Tang Yun	iQIYI
2017	Game Not Over	Xu Shi Qiao / Qiao Qiao	Youku

=== Music video appearances ===
Year	Song title	Details
2016	"Drinking Buddies" (朋友的酒)	Artist(s): Richie Jen; Album: 朋友的酒 + Greatest Hits 3
2016	"You Him Me" (你他我)	Artist(s): Nine Chen 陳零九; Album: 1989一念間 電視原聲帶
2018	"The Closest Thing to Eternal" (最接近永恆的事情) The ending credit song from Love and π	Artist(s): Ivy Shao 邵雨薇; Album: The Closest Thing to Eternal 最接近永恆的事情

== Discography ==
=== Studio albums ===
Title	Album details	Notes
Drizzle 微雨	Released: May 7, 2019; Formats: CD, digital download; Track listing: 1. I Don't Live to Please You 懶得討好; 2. Bad Girl 壞女孩; 3. Pretend to Sleep 裝睡的人; 4. Drizzle 微雨; 5. Just Do What I Want; 6. Stay Away From Me 離我遠一點; 7. The Closest Thing to Eternal 最接近永恆的事情; 8. Just Go With You 好想跟你走; 9. Stuck on You 黏度最佳新人; 10. The Final Test 期末考	Pretend to Sleep: From Berlin, I Love You; Stay Away From Me: The insert song from Love and π; The Closest Thing to Eternal: The ending credit song from Love and π

== Awards and nominations ==
Year	Award	Category	Nominated work	Result
2016	2016 Sanlih Drama Awards	Viewers Choice Drama Award (with Back to 1989 cast)	Back to 1989	Won
2016	2016 Sanlih Drama Awards	Best Actress Award	Back to 1989	Nominated
2016	2016 Sanlih Drama Awards	Best Onscreen Couple Award (with Marcus Chang)	Back to 1989	Won
2016	2016 Sanlih Drama Awards	Best Kiss Award (with Marcus Chang)	Back to 1989	Nominated
2016	18th Taipei Film Festival	Best Actress Award	The Tenants Downstairs	Nominated
