= Iron Ladies (TV series) =

2018 Taiwanese television series

- Promotional poster
- 姊的時代
- Genre: Romance
- Created by: Sanlih E-Television
- Written by: Chen Jie Ying 陳潔瑩 (Ep. 1-3); Lan Wen Xi 藍文希 (Ep. 1-3); Zhang Qing Hui 張清慧 (Ep. 1-3); Ka Fei Yin 咖啡因 (Ep. 4-13); Guo Shi Wei 郭世偉 (Ep. 4-13)
- Directed by: Zhang Jia Xian 張佳賢
- Starring: Aviis Zhong; Ben Wu; Ada Pan; Zhu Zhi-Ying
- Opening theme: "Wonderful Day" by Ben Wu
- Ending theme: " 到不了的以後" by Ben Wu
- Country of origin: Taiwan
- Original languages: Mandarin; Taiwanese
- No. of episodes: 13+1

Production
- Executive producers: Shao Zhi Wei 邵芷薇; Huang Ya Xin 黃雅新
- Producers: Huang Yu Tang 黃毓棠; Wu Can Qi 吳璨琦
- Production location: Taiwan
- Running time: 90 minutes (Ep. 1-12); 120 minutes (Ep. 13)
- Production companies: Enjoy Entertainment Co., Ltd; Sanlih E-Television

Original release
- Network: SET Metro
- Release: 12 January 2018 - 20 April 2018

Related
- The Perfect Match; The Man from the Future; A Thousand Goodnights

Iron Ladies (Chinese: 姊的時代; pinyin: jiě dě shí dài ; literally "Generation of Elder Sisters") is a 2018 Taiwanese television series created and produced by SETTV. It stars Aviis Zhong, Ben Wu, Ada Pan, Zhu Zhi-Ying as the main cast. It was first broadcast on 10 January 2017 on SET Metro and airs every Friday night from 10pm to 11.30pm.

== Cast ==
=== Main cast ===
- Aviis Zhong as Zhou Kai Ting
  - Lu Yi-en (盧以恩) as young Kai Ting
- Ben Wu as Su Can/Ivan
- Ada Pan as Ma Li Sha
- Zhu Zhi-ying as Wang Qing Qing
- Lan Chun-tien as Gao Ze Shan
- Jack Lee as Lin Dai Yu/David
- Wu Ting-chien as Zhao Yuan An
- Jaytherabbit as Fairly Godmother

=== Supporting cast ===
- Wang Man-chiao as Su Li Yu Qin
- Jenny Huang as Cheng Shui Jing
- Linda Lin as Yin Rou Xin
- Hsiao Ching-hung as Gu Da Fei
- Joelle Lu as Xia Zi Qing
- Wayne Song as Xu Tai Heng
- Wills Sia as Josh
- Su Yen-ti as Xiao Q
- Homei as Mai Mai

=== Cameo ===
- Serena Fang as Zhang Yi Yi
- Fu Lei as Zhou Zheng Wu
- Bokeh Kosang as Li Zhi Cheng

== Soundtrack ==
- "Wonderful day" by Ben Wu
- "Unachievable Future 到不了的以後" by Ben Wu
- "Don't Scare On Darkness 別怕黑" by Chen Wei Ting
- "The Best of Us 最好的我們" by Chen Wei Ting
- "Shadow 影子" by Irene Luo
- "Almost 自然凋謝" by Sun Sheng Xi

== Broadcast ==
Network	Country	Airing Date	Timeslot
SET Metro	Taiwan	12 January 2018	Friday 10:00-11:30 pm
Vidol	Taiwan	12 January 2018	Friday 11:30 pm
iQiyi	Taiwan	13 January 2018	Saturday 12:00 am
EBC Variety	Taiwan	13 January 2018	Saturday 10:00-11:30 pm
Super TV	Taiwan	28 January 2018	Sunday 8:30-10:00 pm
Line TV	Taiwan	13 April 2018	Friday 12:00 am
Viu	Hong Kong	13 January 2018	Saturday 00:00
dimsum	Malaysia	27 March 2018	-
E City	Singapore	2018	Sunday 9:30-11:00 pm

== Ratings ==
Competing dramas on rival channels airing at the same time slot were:
- FTV - Intern Doctor
- SET Taiwan - Father's Wish (re-run)
- TTV - My Dear Boy

Air Date	Episode	Average Ratings	Rank
12 January 2018	1	0.90	2
19 January 2018	2	0.70	3
26 January 2018	3	0.64	4
2 February 2018	4	0.98	2
9 February 2018	5	0.99	3
16 February 2018: Airing of "Hot Door Night Chinese New Year Special Episode"
23 February 2018	6	0.90	2
2 March 2018	7	0.94	3
9 March 2018	8	1.14	1
16 March 2018	9	0.94	3
23 March 2018	10	0.97	3
30 March 2018	11	1.05	2
6 April 2018	12	1.06	2
13 April 2018	13	1.50	1
Average ratings		0.98	--
