= What Is Love (TV series) =

- Promotional poster
- 花是愛
- Genre: Romance; Comedy
- Written by: Jane Qi; Xinhui Lin
- Directed by: Huang Tian Ren
- Starring: Wu Kang-jen; Jade Chou
- Opening theme: "單身美好" (Shining Single Life) by Claire Kuo
- Ending theme: "再痛也沒關係" (It Can Hurt More) by Andrew Tan
- Country of origin: Taiwan
- Original language: Mandarin
- No. of series: 1
- No. of episodes: 16

Production
- Producer: Huang Wan Bo
- Production location: Taiwan
- Running time: 90 minutes
- Production company: Bethel Production Company

Original release
- Network: TTV
- Release: 20 July – 9 November 2012

What Is Love (Chinese: 花是愛) is a 2012 Taiwanese romantic-comedy television series. The television drama was produced by Bethel Video Productions Ltd, starring Wu Kang-jen and Jade Chou. The shooting began on April 9, 2012, and first aired on July 20, 2012 on TTV.

== Plot ==
Thirty-two-year-old Li Yi Hua (Jade Chou) is longing for a romantic relationship and wants to marry a good man. Along comes Bai Zong You (Chris Wu), who breaks women's hearts with one-night stands. Bai Zong You sets his sights on wooing Li Yi Hua next. What she doesn't know is that she might have true feels for him.

== Cast ==
The following are the cast of What Is Love series:

Main

- Wu Kang-jen as Bai Zong You
- Jade Chou as Li Yi Hua
- Duncan Lai as Zhang Shao Qian
- Kimi Hsia as Wu Xiao Lu

Supporting

- Jin Qin as Wu Xiao Gui
- Luo Ping as Ai Lei Di
- Gina Lin as Lan Jun
- Andrew Tan as Yan Zu Li
- Luo Bei An as Li Yuan
- Tsai Chen-nan as Wu San Bao
- Albee Hwang as Wang Xue Fu
- Cherry Hsia as Chen Yi Jing
- Xu Gui Ying as Bai Mei Gui
- Riva Chang as wedding hostess

Cameos

- Johnny Lu as Meng Ke Huai (ep1)
- Janel Tsai as Li Xiao Yang (ep1)
- Nylon Chen as Albert (ep5)
- Tender Huang as A Xiu (ep5)
- Kelly Huang as Dancing instructor (eps7-8)

== Broadcast ==
Network	Country/Location	Airing Date	Timeslot
Taiwan Television	Taiwan	July 20, 2012	Fridays, 10pm
TVB	Hong Kong	October 19, 2013	Saturdays, 8pm

Replays

Network	Country/Location	Airing Date	Timeslot (GMT+8)
TTV	Taiwan	July 21, 2012	Saturdays, 12:30pm
TTV	Taiwan	July 22, 2012	Sundays, 11:45pm
TTV	Taiwan	July 26, 2012	Thursdays, 10pm
STAR Chinese Channel	Taiwan	March 25, 2013	Fridays, 9pm

== Production ==
Kenting Beach was used as a background scene for the opening theme of the program as well as the location of the montages used during the last episodes of the series. Various areas around Miramar Entertainment Park were used when the characters walk to and from their workplaces. Other filming locations include: Taipei City Hall, 三星張 Bed and Breakfast Meihua Lake, Cingjing Farm, Songshan Cultural and Creative Park, Diamond Tony's Italian Bistro, The Villa Herbs Restaurant, Cingjing National Hotel, and Yue Ying Landscape Holiday Villas.

The director once had Chris Wu do a scene, in which he carries Jade Chou to the hospital, fifteen times. As a result, Wu's arms eventually got sore and his legs became so weak that Chou was accidentally hit by a wheelchair. Chou did not sustain serious injuries. During the shooting of the last scene of the last episode, Wu accidentally pulled Chou's miniskirt upwards while kissing her, causing her underwear to show up in the midst of the city.

The plush sheep doll seen in the later episodes was made specially by the production team, as it was inconvenient for them to shoot the real sheep, seen during the first episodes, on set.

=== Background ===
In an interview, Jade Chou was asked about her comparison with the character that she was playing. Then around thirty and still single, her similarity with character Li Yi Hua, who is longing for love and wanting to get married, was noted. She answered, "I am also at the stage where people would often ask me about marriage. However, I want to enjoy my life, every single bit of it, no matter if I'm already 35 years old already. Since I was too busy during my twenties, I think that I'm still missing a lot of things. I want to learn even more". (Note: Translated from the Chinese language: "我也已經到了適婚年齡，會聽到一些聲音說，應該要安定下來，但我不會為婚姻而婚姻，我覺得人的緣分是你遇到了就要去接受，生命自有安排，我不會去強求。35歲對我來說是很重要的時間，說年輕不年輕，說成熟我覺得好像還不到。我希望能夠放慢腳步更去感受這個年紀，去感受我年輕時失去的、遺忘的。我20出頭的時候太忙碌了，生活都被工作填滿，我回頭看覺得錯過好多事情，往前看覺得如果我要再往更成熟的方向，有很多事是我還要充實的，我想學得更多。")

== Soundtrack ==
What Is Love

Soundtrack album by Various Artists
- Released: August 14, 2012
- Genre: Mandopop
- Language: Mandarin
- Label: Linfair Records

The What Is Love Original Soundtrack (花是愛 電視原聲帶) was released digitally on August 3, 2012, and the CD was released on August 14, 2012 by various artists under Linfair Records. It contains twelve songs; six original songs and six instrumental versions of those songs. The opening theme song is "單身美好" or "Shining Single Life" by Claire Kuo, while the ending theme song, "再痛也沒關係" or "It Can Hurt More", is by co-actor Andrew Tan.

=== Track listing ===
No.	Title	Lyrics	Music	Singer	Length
1.	"Fog" (大霧)	Zhang Yuqi (詹宇琦)	Zhang Yuqi (詹宇琦)	Zhang Yuqi (詹宇琦)	05:01
2.	"Shining Single Life" (單身美好)	Huang Ting (黃婷)	Wen Weijie	Claire Kuo	04:08
3.	"It Can Hurt More" (再痛也沒關係)	天才	Songshi Yao	Andrew Tan	05:43
4.	"You Give Me Love" (你給我的愛)	He Jun Ming (何俊明)	He Jun Ming (何俊明)	Bii	03:46
5.	"Let's Be Together, Okay" (我們再一起好嗎)	天才	Chen Yan Yun (陳彥允)	Chen Yan Yun (陳彥允)	03:40
6.	"101 Heart Beats" (101次心動)	Chen Zhong Yi (陳忠義)	Chen Zhong Yi (陳忠義)	Andrew Tan	04:08
7.	"Shining Single Life" (Instrumental)		Wen Weijie		04:08
8.	"Fog" (Instrumental)		Zhang Yuqi (詹宇琦)		05:01
9.	"101 Heart Beats" (Instrumental)		Chen Zhong Yi (陳忠義)		04:08
10.	"You Give Me Love" (Instrumental)		He Jun Ming (何俊明)		03:46
11.	"Let's Be Together, Okay" (Instrumental)		Chen Yan Yun (陳彥允)		03:40
12.	"It Can Hurt More" (Instrumental)		Songshi Yao		05:43
Total length:					51:32

== Episode ratings ==
What Is Love ranked fourth in its pilot episode and stayed at the same spot, with the exception of its third episode, until it reached the third spot on its last episode, with a total average of 0.54. Its drama competitors were CTV's Confucius, FTV's Independent Heroes, and SETTV's Rainy Night Flower and Father's Wish. The viewers' survey was conducted by AGB Nielsen.

Air Date	Episode	Episode Title	Average Ratings	Rank	Remarks
July 20, 2012	01	Only Love That Comes Naturally Is True Love	0.52	4	
July 27, 2012	02	Let's Talk About A Low-Calorie, Burden-Free Love	0.61	4	
August 3, 2014	Taiwan Television broadcast the 2012 Summer Olympic special program				
August 10, 2012	03	Love Is A War; The First To Fall In Love, Loses	0.62	3	
August 17, 2012	04	Love, Sometimes Makes Your Heart Ache	0.54	4	
August 24, 2012	05	If You Don't Intend To Love Me For A Long Time, Then Don't Say 'I Love You'	0.58	4	
August 31, 2012	06	Give Us A Chance To Fall In Love With Each Other	0.47	4	
September 7, 2012	07	What To Do... I Think I've Fallen In Love With You	0.62	4	
September 14, 2012	08	This Time, Let's Love Each Other With Forever As A Premise	0.57	4	
September 21, 2012	09	Wanting To Become A Better Person For Him, Maybe That's What Love Is	0.50	4	
September 28, 2012	10	Is There Really No Chance For Us?	0.63	4	
October 5, 2012	11	I Just Want To Be By Your Side, Even If Only As A Friend	0.55	4	
October 12, 2012	12	Do You Really Not Know That The Person He Wants To Spend His Life With Is You?	0.53	4	
October 19, 2012	13	I'll Give Him The Happiness He Deserves	0.49	4	
October 26, 2012	14	Sometimes Love Can Be Very Simple	0.33	4	
November 2, 2012	15	No Matter What Happens Later, I Won't Regret Having Loved This Much	0.53	4	
November 9, 2012	16	Will You Still Want To Spend The Rest Of Your Life With Me?	0.61	3	Last episode
Average rating			0.54		
