= Chung Hsin-yu =

Taiwanese host and actress

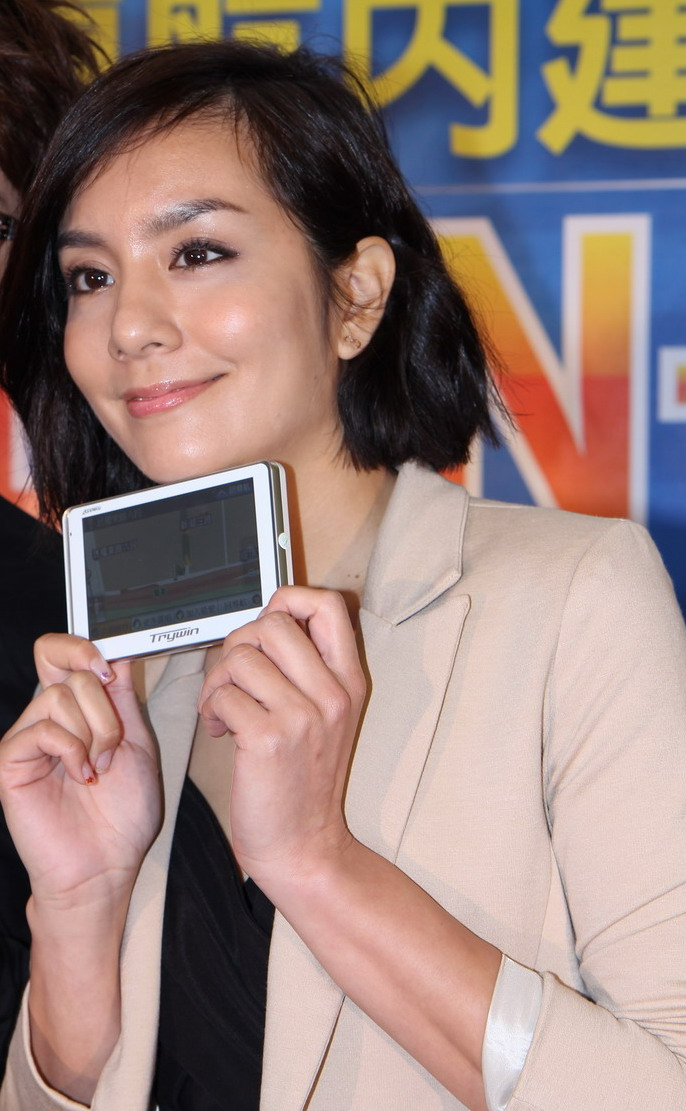
- Chung in June 2019
- Born: July 9, 1983 (age 43); Taipei, Taiwan
- Other names: Sasa; Sha Sha; Zhong Xinyu
- Education: Taipei City University of Science and Technology
- Occupations: Television host, actress, entrepreneur
- Years active: 2002–present
- Partner: Chien (2006-present)

Chinese name
- Traditional Chinese: 鍾欣愉
- Simplified Chinese: 钟欣愉
- Hanyu Pinyin: Zhōng Xīnyú

Alternative name
- Chinese: 莎莎
- Hanyu Pinyin: Shāshā
- Jyutping: Saa1 Saa1

Chung Hsin-yu (Chinese: 鍾欣愉; born July 9, 1983), also known as Sasa or Sha Sha, is a Taiwanese television host, actress and entrepreneur. She began her career as a model and is best known for hosting the food travel show Super Taste and the reality show Hi, Come in.

== Other ventures ==
Chung opened a café, Halo, in Taipei, in 2014. She previously owned a fashion outlet, also named Halo, from 2008 to 2015.

== Filmography ==
=== Hosting ===
English title	Original title	Notes
Super Taste	食尚玩家	
Next Generations	超級接班人	
Next Generations 2	超級接班人2	
Super Idol 9	超級偶像9	
WTO Sister Show	WTO姐妹會	
Super Imitator	超級模王大道	
Super Imitator 2	超級模王大道2	
Cosmos Cat	貓咪小宇宙	YouTube program
Hi, Come in	嗨！營業中	Cast member

=== Television series ===
Year	English title	Original title	Role	Notes
2002	Super School	超人氣學園	Xiang Yun-fei	
2003	Spicy Teacher	麻辣鮮師	Zhong Nai-jing	
2003	Seventh Grade	七年級生	Duan Yi-xuan	
2004	Love Contract	愛情合約	Lee Xin-lei	
2006	Marry Me	我們結婚吧	Mi-fen	
2008	I Do?	幸福的抉擇	He Si-yu	
2008	Miss No Good	不良笑花	Chu Ya-an (youth)	
2014	Rock N' Road	A咖的路	Herself	
2015	Marry Me, or Not?	必娶女人	Fortune teller's customer	

=== Film ===
Year	English title	Original title	Role	Notes
2014	How to Train Your Dragon 2	—N/a	Astrid Hofferson	Dubbing; Taiwanese version
2019	How to Train Your Dragon: The Hidden World	—N/a	Astrid Hofferson	Dubbing; Taiwanese version

=== Music video appearances ===
Year	Artist	Song title
2001	Genie Chuo	"Homesick"
2005	Kenji Wu	"Despise Memorising"
2008	Joi Chua	"Fortunate to Have You Love Me"
2009	2moro and Plungon	"Super Taste"
2010	Hsiao Hung-jen	"Dian Dian Hao Ma"

== Published works ==
- Chung, Hsin-yu (2011). ㄨ Ya Xi Shi Shang Wan Jia ㄨ丫係食尚玩家. Taiwan: Interface Communication. ISBN 9789868276383.
- Chung, Hsin-yu (2018). HALO! Sasa's Dessert Cosmos HALO!莎莎的甜點小宇宙. Taiwan: Crown Publishing. ISBN 9789869623650.

== Awards and nominations ==
Year	Award	Category	Nominated work	Result
2012	47th Golden Bell Awards	Best Host in a Variety Show	Super Imitator	Nominated
