= Ko Shu-chin =

Taiwanese actress

Samantha Ko Shu-chin
- Born: 4 November 1967 (age 58); Taiwan
- Education: Yu Da High School of Commerce and Home Economics
- Occupation: Actress
- Years active: 1990—present

Chinese name
- Chinese: 柯淑勤
Transcriptions
Standard Mandarin
- Hanyu Pinyin: Kē Shūqín
- Wade–Giles: K'o Shu-ch'in

Ko Shu-chin or Ke Shuqin (Chinese: 柯淑勤; born 4 November 1967), also known as Samantha Ko, is a Taiwanese actress. She was nominated at 56th Golden Horse Award for Best Leading Actress for her role in A Sun.

== Filmography ==
=== Film ===
Year	English title	Mandarin title	Role
2004	Comes the Black Dog	黑狗來了	Su-chuan
2005	Bad Moon	惡月	Chang Hui-hsin
2012	Murderer named Justice	明仁街正義殺人事件	Hsu's mother
2012	Din Tao: Leader of the Parade	陣頭	Aunt Ta
2012	The Soul of the Bread	愛的麵包魂	Chiu's mother
2012	Touch of the Light	逆光飛翔	Hsiao-chieh's mother
2015	To the Fore	破風	Hsiao Wei
2016	When Mary Met Johnny...	愛上花豹女	Ho Meng-chieh
2017	Edge of Innocence	夏天十九岁的肖像	Xia Yingying's mother
2018	Xiao Mei	小美	Xiao Mei's mother
2019	A Sun	陽光普照	Sister Chin
2019	Heavy Craving	大餓	Ying Chuan's mother
2023	Behind the Blue Eyes	不能流淚的悲傷	Lin Han-tsung's mother

=== Television series (selected) ===
Year	English title	Mandarin title	Role	Notes
1993	Justice Pao	包青天	Chu Li-erh	Ep. 19-21: The Tale of Two Nails(雙釘記)
1996	Dream of the Red Chamber	紅樓夢	Yüan Yang	
2003	100% Senorita	千金百分百	Yang Zhu Fang	
2003	Crystal Boys	孽子	Li's mother	
2006	The Hospital	白色巨塔	Mrs. Hsu	
2007	I Shall Succeed	我一定要成功	Ho Jui-chuan	
2009	ToGetHer	愛就宅一起	Mars' mother	
2009	Love Above All	真情滿天下	Hung Chun-man	
2010	Year of the Rain	那年，雨不停國	Wang Xiao Ling	
2011	Love Recipe	料理情人夢	Li's mother	
2011	Skip Beat!	華麗的挑戰	Qing Jie	
2012	Once Upon a Love	原來愛·就是甜蜜	Mrs. Xu	
2012	Sweet Sweet Bodyguard	剩女保鏢	Li Qin-Mei	
2013	A Hint of You	美味的想念	Xia Lin Zhao Di	
2013	Drama Go! Go! Go!	姐姐立正向前走	Hsueh Ling-fang	
2014	The Way We Were	16個夏天	Linda	
2014	Aim High	22K夢想高飛	Feng Si Si	
2015	Marry Me, or Not?	必娶女人	Wang Yue E	
2015	Youth Power	哇！陳怡君	Lian Bai He	
2016	Love of Sandstorm	植劇場—戀愛沙塵暴	Chen Pei-ling	
2017	Attention, Love!	稍息立正我愛你	Teacher Yue E	
2019	My Father's Words	人生二十甲	Chen Wu-hsueh	
2025	I Am Married...But!	童話故事下集		

=== Television movie ===
Year	English title	Mandarin title	Role	Notes
2003	Home Series (Reunion Dinner)	回家系列之「團圓飯	Mother	

== Awards and nominations ==
Year	Award	Category	Nominated work	Result
1999	34th Golden Bell Awards	Best Actress	Spring and Satin	Nominated
2000	35th Golden Bell Awards	Best Actress	'Hand in hand	Nominated
2001	36th Golden Bell Awards	Best Actress	Wakes up! Mom	Nominated
2001	36th Golden Bell Awards	Best Actress in a Miniseries or TV Film	Three Ace	Nominated
2003	38th Golden Bell Awards	Best TV Movie Supporting Actress	Home Series (Reunion Dinner)	Won
2003	38th Golden Bell Awards	Best TV Series Leading Actress	Crystal Boys	Won
2006	41st Golden Bell Awards	Best TV Series Supporting Actress	A Tao	Nominated
2010	45th Golden Bell Awards	Best TV Series Supporting Actress	Year Of The Rain	Nominated
2016	51st Golden Bell Awards	Best TV Series Supporting Actress	Youth Power	Nominated
2017	52nd Golden Bell Awards	Best TV Series Leading Actress	Love of Sandstorm	Won
2019	56th Golden Horse Awards	Best Leading Actress	A Sun	Nominated
2020	15th Seoul International Drama Awards	Best Leading Actress	My Father's Words	Nominated
2020	14th Asian Film Awards	Best Supporting Actress	A Sun	Won
