= Thirty Something (Taiwanese TV series) =

- Promotional poster
- 我的30定律
- Created by: Eastern Television
- Written by: Xie Xiao Mi; Fei Gong Yi; Chen Hui Ru
- Directed by: Xu Zhao Ren
- Starring: Xiu Jie Kai; Kimi Hsia; Esther Liu; Samuel Gu
- Opening theme: "My Time 我的時代" by Patrick Brasca
- Ending theme: "Rainbows" by Andrew Yeh
- Country of origin: Taiwan
- Original language: Mandarin
- No. of seasons: 1
- No. of episodes: 16

Production
- Producers: Chen Hui-ling; Lin Yu Qing
- Production location: Taiwan
- Running time: 90 minutes

Original release
- Network: TTV; EBC Variety
- Release: 12 December 2015 – 2 April 2016

Related
- To the Dearest Intruder; Love @ Seventeen

Thirty Something (Chinese: 我的30定律; pinyin: wo de san shi ding lu; literally "My 30 Law") is a 2015-2016 Taiwanese drama television series created and produced by Eastern Television. It stars Xiu Jie Kai, Kimi Hsia, Esther Liu and Samuel Gu. Filming began on October 22, 2015, and wrapped up on February 29, 2016. First original broadcast began on December 12, 2015, on TTV airing every Saturday night at 10:00-11:30 pm.

== Synopsis ==
When a 30-year-old woman hits a career and personal low, can she rebuild her life? He Mei Liang (Kimi Hsia) should be at the peak of her career and life, but she actually finds herself out of a job. She used to work in medical equipment sales, but she let people walk all over her while she was too afraid to stand up for herself, so she ends up hitting rock bottom. Although she used to look down on insurance salespeople, Mei Liang gets a job in the insurance industry and is determined to succeed. Mei Liang is partnered with the more veteran insurance salesman, You Zi Jie (Xiu Jie Kai), who tries to prevent her from making too many gaffes in her new job. Can Zi Jie help Mei Liang rebuild her life and career?

== Cast ==
=== Main cast ===
- Xiu Jie Kai as You Zi Jie
- Kimi Hsia as He Mei Liang
- Esther Liu as Fang Wen Hui
- Samuel Gu as Pan Wei Kai

=== Supporting cast ===
- Lynn Zhang as You Yu Qing
- Huang Pin Xuan as You Ya Han
- Hsieh Chi-Wen as He Qing Ming
- Hsieh Li-Chin as He Bao Li
- Soda Voyu as Wu Zheng Hao
- Zhang Wei Ni as Zhang Xiao Jing (Xiao Jing)
- Zhang Dong Qing as Zhang Jing Fang
- Ma Hui-Chen as Chen Yu Juan

=== Guest cast ===
- Jay Shih as Lawyer Lan
- Francesca Kao as Ms. Lin

== Soundtrack ==
- "My Time 我的時代" by Patrick Brasca
- "Rainbows" by Andrew Yeh
- "I Believe in My Belief 我相信我的相信" by Andrew Yeh
- "The Nearness of Distance 親密的疏離" by Celeste Syn
- "Throw You In The River 把你丟進淡水河裡" by Celeste Syn
- "Answer 謎底" by Celeste Syn
- "Brand New Day" by Cindy Yen
- "Arrangement 安排" by Cindy Yen
- "Singing a Song Because of Longing For 唱首歌因為思念" by Cindy Yen

== Broadcast ==
Network	Country	Airing Date	Timeslot
TTV	Taiwan	December 12, 2015	Saturday 10:00-11:30 pm
EBC Variety	Taiwan	December 13, 2015	Sunday 10:00-11:30 pm
Now Entertainment	Hong Kong	September 22, 2016	Monday to Friday 8:30-10:00 pm
