= Lost in Perfection =

- Theatrical release poster
- Directed by: Sung Hsin-yin
- Written by: Sung Hsin-yin
- Starring: Lin Mei-hsiu; Ivy Shao
- Cinematography: Chen Chi-Wen
- Music by: Lee Cin Cin
- Production companies: Screenworks Asia; My Story Entertainment; Taiwan Television Enterprise; Tomorrow Together Capital; Happinessroad Productions
- Distributed by: Catchplay
- Release date: 27 October 2023 (Taiwan)
- Running time: 114 minutes
- Country: Taiwan
- Language: Taiwanese

Lost in Perfection (Chinese: 惡女) is a Taiwanese suspense thriller film written and directed by Sung Hsin-yin. Produced by Screenworks Asia, and stars Lin Mei-hsiu and Ivy Shao. The film was released in Taiwan on October 27, 2023.

== Cast ==
- Lin Mei-hsiu
- Ivy Shao
- Rhydian Vaughan
- Lee Tien-chu
- Tseng Shao-Tsung

== Production ==
In May 2023, The film was announced by Screenworks Asia. The trailer of the film was released on August 29, 2023.

== Reception ==
Jose Solis of Common Sense Media rated the film 3 stars out of 5. Han Cheung of the Taipei Times reviewed the film.
