= Bad Moon (2005 film) =

- Film poster
- Traditional Chinese: 惡月
- Simplified Chinese: 恶月
- Hanyu Pinyin: È Yuè
- Jyutping: Ok3 Jyut6
- Directed by: Chi Yin; Willing Lu
- Written by: Chi Yin; Huang Su-Yu
- Produced by: Central Motion Picture Corporation
- Starring: Kimi Hsia; Ko Shu-chin; Lam Lei; Yin Chao-te
- Edited by: Lei Chen-ching
- Release date: 2005
- Running time: 98 minutes
- Country: Taiwan
- Language: Mandarin

Bad Moon (simplified Chinese: 恶月; traditional Chinese: 惡月), also known as E yue, is a 2005 Taiwanese film directed by Willing Lu and Chi Yin. Produced by Central Motion Picture Corporation, the film is 98 minutes long. It stars Kimi Hsia, Ko Shu-chin, Lam Lei, and Yin Chao-te. Bad Moon was previously titled Devil's Holiday (Chinese: 魔鬼假期) and is a horror and thriller film.

Bad Moon explores how mental illness may have driven a girl to jump from a building. It was largely filmed late at night which disrupted actor Lam Lei's circadian rhythm and was agonising for him.

Apple Daily film critic Zhuang Youfen praised the film, writing, "The plot is suspenseful and compact, and the audience can enjoy the fun of reasoning." Bad Moon had an underwhelming performance at the box office.
