= Love & π =

2018 Taiwanese television series

- Promotional poster
- 愛的3.14159
- Genre: Romance, Friendship, Slice of life
- Created by: EBC
- Written by: Zou Wei-gang, Lin Wei-ting, Gong Min-hui
- Directed by: Chen Bao-zhong, Ye Hong-wei
- Starring: Ivy Shao, Ben Wu, Daniel Chen, Candy Yang
- Opening theme: "Think of You" (愛你剛剛好) by Ben Wu
- Ending theme: "The Closest Thing To Eternal" (最接近永恆的事情) by Ivy Shao
- Country of origin: Taiwan
- Original languages: Mandarin; Taiwanese; English
- No. of episodes: 17

Production
- Producer: Liu Yu-cheng
- Production location: Taiwan
- Running time: 75 minutes

Original release
- Network: TTV; EBC
- Release: 21 July – 11 November 2018

Related
- Single Ladies Senior; Five Missions

Love & π (Chinese: 愛的3.14159; pinyin: aì de 3.14159; literally "The Pi of Love") is a 2018 Taiwanese television series created and produced by EBC. It stars Ivy Shao, Ben Wu, Daniel Chen and Candy Yang as the main cast. Filming began on 28 May 2018 and ended on 4 November 2018. It was first broadcast on 21 July 2018 on EBC and aired every Saturday night from 10pm to 11.30pm.

== Synopsis ==
Zhao Wu Xian, Zhao Yuan Man, Hou Zi Cheng and Lin Mei Xin are good friends who grew up together in the same orphanage in Yun Lin. In year 2009, Wu Xian, Yuan Man and Zi Cheng went to Taipei to pursue their dreams. They will be facing some challenges on the way, how will they overcome it?

Yuan Man thinks of her relationship with Wu Xian as siblings whereas Wu Xian does not. He wants to protect Yuan Man forever and would like her to be his partner. However this journey of love is not smooth, and may even reach bottleneck. However, their “Love” will definitely follow the “Circle” (Yuan/π) and back on its path again.

== Cast ==
=== Main cast ===
- Ivy Shao as Zhao Yuan-man
- Ben Wu as Zhao Wu-xian
- Daniel Chen as Hou Zi-cheng
- Candy Yang as Lin Mei-xin

=== Supporting cast ===
- Jenny Lee as Zhang Ruo-yun
- Blue Lan as Liang Yi-qing
- Kerr Hsu as Xu Shi-ming
- Wasir Chou as Bai Wei-guang
- Jian Chang as Dean Zhao (Dean of the orphanage)
- Andrew Liu as Zhang Hai-ping

== Soundtrack ==
Type	Title	Singer(s)
Opening Theme	Think of You 愛你剛剛好	Ben Wu
Ending Theme	The Closest Thing To Eternal 最接近永恆的事情	Ivy Shao
Insert song	到不了的以後	Ben Wu
Insert song	Stay Away From Me 離我遠一點	Ivy Shao
Insert song	Thick Lines 粗線條	F.E.E.L
Insert song	To Be Continued 未完待續	F.E.E.L
Insert song	當我想念你	Miu Chu
Insert song	Marching Forward 向前走	Lim Giong

== Broadcast ==
Network	Country	Airing Date	Timeslot
TTV	Taiwan	July 21, 2018	Saturday 10:00-11:30 pm
LINE TV	Taiwan	July 21, 2018	Saturday 11:30 pm
EBC Variety	Taiwan	July 22, 2018	Sunday 10:00-11:30 pm
iQiyi	Taiwan	July 22, 2018	Sunday 10:00 pm
KKTV	Taiwan	July 22, 2018	Sunday 11:30 pm
CHOCO TV	Taiwan	July 23, 2018	Monday 12:00 pm
LiTV	Taiwan	July 23, 2018	Monday 12:00 pm
Golden Group	Taiwan	July 28, 2018	Saturday 8:30-10:00 pm
GMA News TV	Philippines	2021	TBA

== Ratings ==
Air Date	Episode	Average Ratings	Rank
Jul 21, 2018	1	0.94	4
Jul 28, 2018	2	0.86	4
Aug 4, 2018	3	0.55	4
Aug 11, 2018	4	0.79	4
Aug 18, 2018	5	0.71	4
Aug 25, 2018	6	0.83	4
Sep 1, 2018	7	0.88	4
Sep 8, 2018	8	0.81	4
Sep 15, 2018	9	1.12	3
Sep 22, 2018	10	0.80	4
Sep 29, 2018	11	1.06	4
Oct 6, 2018	12	0.80	4
Oct 13, 2018	13	1.02	3
Oct 20, 2018	14	0.93	4
Oct 27, 2018	15	0.98	4
Nov 3, 2018	16	0.94	4
Nov 11, 2018	17	1.10	3
Average ratings		0.89	--

== Awards and nominations ==
Year	Ceremony	Category	Nominee	Result
2019	54th Golden Bell Awards	Best Newcomer in a Television Series	Jenny Lee	Nominated
