= Ben Wu (entertainer) =

Taiwanese singer, actor and television host

- 吳思賢
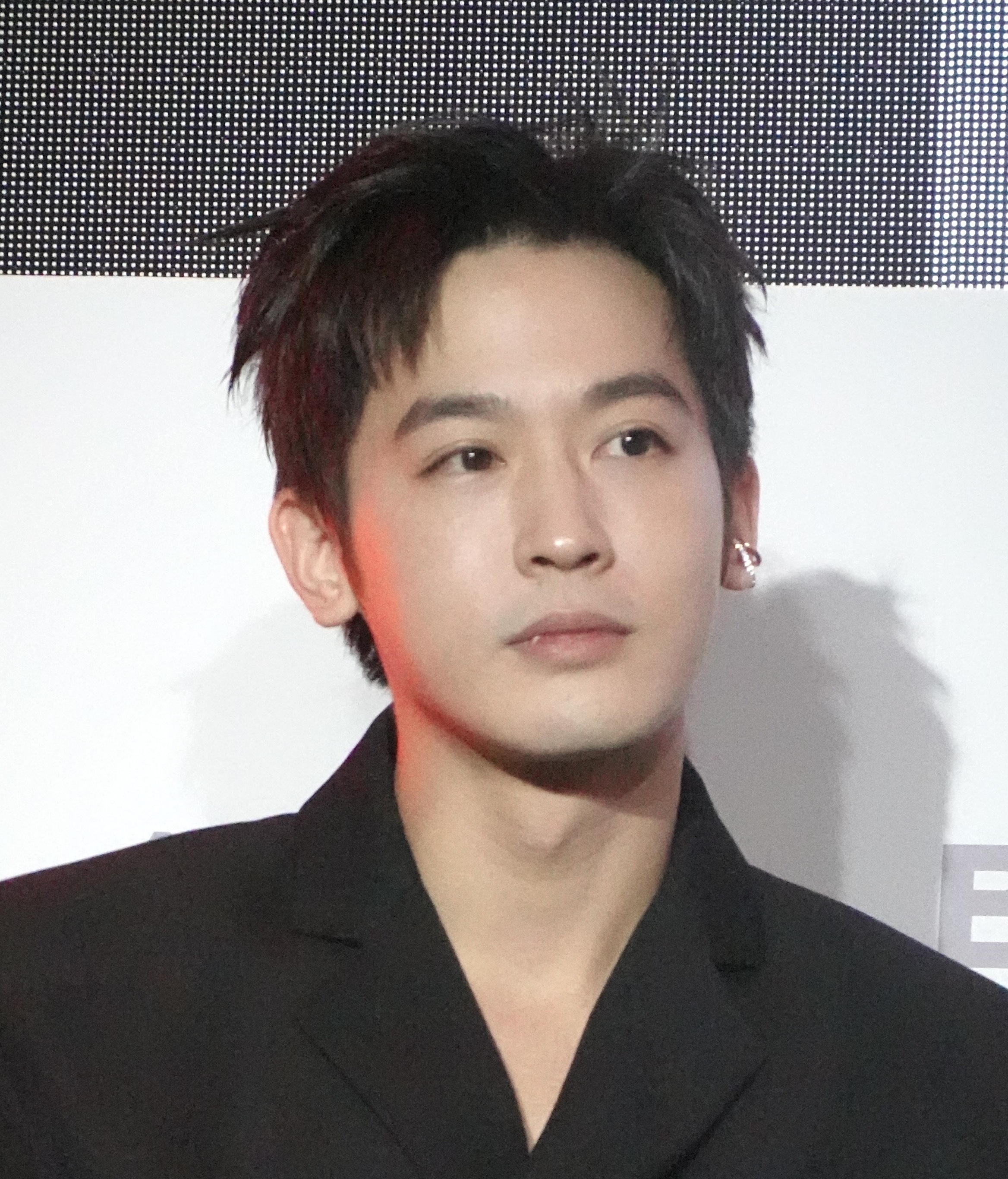
- Wu in 2025
- Born: Wu Szu-shien; 5 January 1991 (age 35); Taipei, Taiwan
- Occupations: Singer, actor, television host
- Years active: 2008–present
- Height: 177 cm (5 ft 10 in)
- Family: Si Jia Wu (oldest sister); Ann Wu (second sister)
- Musical career
- Also known as: Wu Szu-Shien
- Genres: Mandopop, Dance
- Instrument: Vocals
- Labels: Wonderful Music Co. Ltd. (2014–present); A Legend Star Entertainment Corp (2010–present)

Chinese name
- Traditional Chinese: 吳思賢
- Simplified Chinese: 吴思贤
Transcriptions
Standard Mandarin
- Hanyu Pinyin: Wú Sī Xián

Ben Wu (Chinese: 吳思賢; pinyin: Wú Sī Xián; Born 5 January 1991), also known as Wu SzuShien, is a Taiwanese singer, actor and television host.

== Career ==
=== 2007–2013: Early beginnings ===
In 2007, Ben Wu participated in the variety program, Diamond Club, as the dance club president of Taipei Municipal Jianguo High School.

On 22 February 2008, he became a fixed cast member of the variety show, Mo Fang Bang Bang Tang. His last episode aired on 24 December 2008.

In 2010, Wu signed with A Legend Star Entertainment Corpas one of their artists.

=== 2013–2014: Army hiatus, debut as singer ===
In May 2013, he enlisted into the army and was discharged in 2014.

After his discharge, Wu signed with music label Wonderful Music Co. Ltd. and debuted as a singer with the album, The Best...? in 2014.

=== 2015–present: Debut as an actor, release of first EP "Hide and Seek" ===
In 2015, Wu made his debut as an actor in the SETTV drama, Love Cuisine as one of the supporting male leads. Due to his role in the show, he was awarded the Best Potential Award during the Sanlih Drama Awards in 2015. He was also nominated for Best Newcomer in A Television Series Award during the 51st Golden Bell Awards.

On 30 May 2016, he released his first EP "Hide and Seek". In the same year, Wu starred as the male lead in the web-drama I Like You, You Know?.

In 2017, Wu starred as the second male lead in the SETTV drama, The Perfect Match.

In 2018, he starred as the male lead in the SETTV drama, Iron Ladies, along with co-star Aviis Zhong. Two of his songs became the opening and closing OST for the show.

In addition, his upcoming drama, Love and 3.14159 is set to air on 22 July 2018.

== Personal life ==
Ben Wu is an alumnus of National Taiwan University of Arts as well as Tamkang University, where he studied acting. He has 2 elder sisters. His eldest sister, Si Ying Wu is a stewardess. His second sister, Ann Wu, is also an artiste from the same label, A Legend Star Entertainment Corp. She was a model, a member of Sparrow Girls (M.A.N Girls), and has her own clothing brand, Ann Wu.

== Filmography ==
=== Television ===
Year	Title	Role	Network	Notes
2015	Love Cuisine	Wang Mai-zhi	SETTV	Supporting role
2016	Dance dance together	Wu Szu-shien	SETTV	Cameo
2016	I Like You, You Know?	Chu Tian-qi	LINE TV	Lead role
2017	The Perfect Match	Meng Shao-wei	SETTV	Second lead
2018	Iron Ladies	Tsu Tsan (Ivan)	SETTV	Lead role
2018	Love & π	Chao Wu-sian	ETTV	Lead role
2019	Let's Go Crazy on LIVE!	You Yuan Le	SETTV	Lead role

=== Variety shows ===
Year	Title	Network	Notes
2008	Mo Fang Bang Bang Tang	Channel V	Fixed cast

=== Films ===
- Always Miss You (2014)

== Discography ==
=== Studio albums ===
Title	Album details
The Best...?	Released: 30 June 2014; Language: Mandarin

=== Extended plays ===
Title	Album details
Hide and Seek	Released: 30 May 2016; Language: Mandarin

== Awards and nominations ==
=== Music ===
Year	Award	Category	Nomination	Result
2015	Hito Music Awards	Best Newcomer Award	The Best...?	Won
2015	CNTV Music Awards	Best Newcomer Award	The Best...?	Won
2017	MTV Global Mandarin Music Awards	Most Promising Artist Award		Won

=== Acting ===
Year	Award	Category	Nomination	Result
2015	4th Sanlih Drama Awards	Best Potential Award	Love Cuisine	Won
2016	51st Golden Bell Awards	Best Newcomer in A Television Series Award	Love Cuisine	Nominated
