= The Devil Punisher =

2020 Taiwanese television series

- Also known as: The Sky Watcher/Skyscanner
- Chinese: 天巡者
- Hanyu Pinyin: Tiān Xúnzhě
- Genre: Supernatural; Time travel Romance
- Created by: Sanlih E-Television; Netflix
- Written by: Kimi Lin (Screenwriting coordinator); Chen Jingwen; Fan Yun-Chieh; Huang Yunbei
- Directed by: Zhang Jinrong; Chen Ronghui
- Starring: Mike He; Ivy Shao; Amanda Chou; Johnny Yang; Anson Chen; Jane Cheng; Roy Chang
- Opening theme: "Last Look (喂，再看我一遍)" by MIXER
- Ending theme: "After a Thousand Years (千年以後)" by Nine Chen
- Country of origin: Taiwan
- Original language: Mandarin
- No. of episodes: 20

Production
- Producer: Chen Muhan
- Production location: Taiwan
- Running time: 90 minutes

Original release
- Network: TTV Main Channel; Netflix; SET Metro
- Release: 25 October 2020 – 14 March 2021

The Devil Punisher (Chinese: 天巡者; pinyin: Tiān Xúnzhě; lit. 'heaven patroller') is a 2020 Taiwanese time travel and supernatural series. It stars Mike He, Ivy Shao, Amanda Chou, Johnny Yang, Anson Chen, Jane Cheng and Roy Chang as the main cast. It is the second collaboration between Sanlih E-Television and Netflix, and is also the channel's flagship drama for the year. The drama is one of the 107 television shows that received 23 million New Taiwan dollars' worth of grants from the government. Filming commenced on 20 February 2020 and wrapped on 12 July 2020. It was first broadcast on 25 October 2020.

== Plot ==
A baker by day and demon fighter by night, Zhong Kui, a reincarnated deity must jog his amnesiac lover's memory of their millennium-long romance.

== Cast ==
=== Main cast ===
- Mike He as Zhong Kui / Zhong Zheng-nan
- Ivy Shao as Lady Meng / Meng Hsin-yu / Xiao-bing
- Amanda Chou as Lady Qin Kuang
- Johnny Yang as Cheng Huang
- Anson Chen as Lu Bo-ya
- Jane Cheng as Li En-hsi
- Roy Chang as Ouyang Kai

=== Supporting cast ===
- Chen Bor-jeng as Bat Spirit / Ah-Fu
- Dewi Chien as Seven Star Sword Spirit / Hsiao-chi
- Tan Ai-chen as Grandma Wu
- Yin Chao-te as Wu Ching-yuan
- Peter Kuan as Chen Ze-hsuan
- Sing Hom as Wei Yun-han
- Hank Wang as Zhao Jia-jun

=== Guest appearances ===
- Akio Chen as taoist ghost
- Ed Chan as male ghost
- Wu Ting-Chien as male ghost
- Da Fei as policeman
- Chang Han as Chen Zheng-ming
- Vicky Tseng as Li Shu-hui
- Yu Yanchen as Ah-Ping
- Hsieh Chi-Wen as Hong Cheng-you
- King Liu as Cheng-you's boss
- Chang Chien as En-hsi's mother
- Pipi Yao as Gao Jia-chi
- Lyan Cheng as Yao Mu-ching
- Kelly Ko as Ze-hsuan's mother
- Ally Chiu as Wu Yu-han
- Chang Kuo-tung as Lord of the Soil and the Ground
- Daniel Chen
- Kurt Chou
- Ivelyn Lee
- Louis Lin
- Kingone Wang

== Soundtrack ==
- "Last Look 喂，再看我一遍" by MIXER
- "After a Thousand Years 千年以後" by Nine Chen
- "If You Turn Around 如果你敢回頭" by Amanda Wang and Anson Chen
- "Just Memories 回不去的回憶" by Men Envy Children
- "Guards of Princess Wendy 溫蒂公主的侍衛" by Accusefive
- "Loveholic 嗜愛動物" by MIXER
- "The Light-Year Passenger 穿越光年的孤獨" by Tizzy Bac
- "As I am 我已成為我想要的我" by Shara Lin
- "Blossom 桃花籤" by DeerJenny
- "Shining Stars 星點" by DeerJenny

== Ratings ==
Competing dramas on rival channels airing at the same time slot were:

- CTS – U Motherbaker, Mother to be
- FTV – Animal Whisper, See You at the Market, MIU404
- CTV – Chinese Restaurant, Someday or One Day (re-run)
- SET Taiwan – Top Singers

Air Date	Chapter	Average Ratings	Rank
Oct 25, 2020	1	1.19	1
Nov 1, 2020	2	1.42	1
Nov 8, 2020	3	1.37	1
Nov 15, 2020	4	1.40	1
Nov 22, 2020	5	1.47	1
Nov 29, 2020	6	1.71	1
Dec 6, 2020	7	1.67	1
Dec 13, 2020	8	1.63	1
Dec 20, 2020	9	1.41	1
Dec 27, 2020	10	1.59	1
Jan 3, 2021	11	1.60	1
Jan 10, 2021	12	1.27	1
Jan 17, 2021	13	1.48	1
Jan 24, 2021	14	1.26	1
Jan 31, 2021	15	1.36	1
Feb 7, 2021	16	1.31	1
Feb 14, 2021: Due to the Chinese New Year holidays, festive programmes will be aired instead.
Feb 21, 2021	17	1.18	1
Feb 28, 2021	18	1.31	1
Mar 7, 2021	19	1.40	1
Mar 14, 2021	20	1.54	1
Average ratings		1.43	

- Numbers in red denote the highest rating and numbers in blue denote the lowest rating for the drama's tenure.
- Ratings are obtained from AGB Nielsen.
