= The Wonder Woman =

Chinese name
- Traditional Chinese: 跟鯊魚接吻
- Literal meaning: Kissing a Shark
Transcriptions
Standard Mandarin
- Hanyu Pinyin: Gēn Shāyú Jiēwěn
- Genre: Romance; Comedy
- Created by: Sanlih E-Television
- Written by: Yaya Chang 張綺恩; Lee Chieh-Yu 李婕瑀
- Directed by: Ker Choon Hooi 郭春暉
- Starring: Aviis Zhong; Wes Lo; Jack Lee; Lan Zhang
- Opening theme: "Disguise 為你變成他" by Tarcy Su
- Ending theme: "Where Are My Jeans? 少了一件牛仔褲" by Janice Yan
- Country of origin: Taiwan
- Original language: Mandarin
- No. of episodes: 18

Production
- Production location: Taiwan
- Running time: 75 minutes
- Production companies: Sanlih E-Television; Enjoy Entertainment

Original release
- Network: TTV Main Channel; SET Metro
- Release: 2 February – 31 May 2020

Related
- Let's Go Crazy on LIVE!; Lost Romance

The Wonder Woman (Chinese: 跟鯊魚接吻; pinyin: Gēn Shāyú Jiēwěn; lit. 'kissing a shark') is a 2020 Taiwanese romantic comedy television series. It stars Aviis Zhong, Wes Lo, Jack Lee and Lan Zhang as the main cast. It was first broadcast on 2 February 2020. The drama was filmed as it aired. Production wrapped on 24 May 2020 and the celebratory banquet was held on 26 May 2020.

Behind-the-scenes clips were aired on Vidol under the name "Shark Bites" (Chinese: 鯊魚咬一口; pinyin: shā yú yǎo yī kǒu; literally "the shark bites once").

== Plot ==
An ace in the world of marketing, Du Ai Sha has spent her entire career fighting her way to the top. Setting her eyes on the goals ahead, she is known for her fierce tenacity and unwavering determination. Never allowing herself to be sidetracked by anything that might come her way, Ai Sha uses whatever means necessary to get the job done.

Working alongside Ai Sha is Yi Feiyang, another marketing whiz who always has an answer to every problem and has an uncanny ability to gain the advantage, no matter the situation. Completely different in their approaches to work and life, Ai Sha and Feiyang have developed a fierce workplace rivalry, as they each strive to be the best in the business.

But when trouble stirs, Ai Sha and Feiyang are forced to work together, using their combined talents to overcome the obstacles ahead. Realizing they make a pretty good team, the two opponents begin to see each other in a whole new light.

== Cast ==
=== Main cast ===
- Aviis Zhong as Du Ai-sha
- Wes Lo as Yi Fei-yang
- Jack Lee as Ye Xuan
- Lan Zhang as Tang Xiao-an

=== Supporting cast ===
- Gabriel Lan as Qi Zhen-kai
- Demi Yin as Wen Jing-jing
- Cui Pei-yi as Fang Hua
- Heaven Hai as Ms May
- Wu Bi-lian as Ms Zhen Zhen / Jennifer
- Huang Jian-hao as Du Nan-cheng
- Chen Jia-yang as Du Dong-xue
- Amanda Liu as Vicky
- Rita Feng as Yuki
- Ckay as Steven
- Yen Hao as Liao Xi-jun
- Xiao Dong-yi as Ni-mo
- Yu Cheng-xin as Ah-jiong
- Liao Wei-bo as Ah Ben
- Emmie Ries as Marguerite
- Lu Wei-zhen as Sui-lin

== Soundtrack ==
- "Disguise 為你變成他" by Tarcy Su
- "Where Are My Jeans? 少了一件牛仔褲" by Janice Yan
- "True Colours 真面目" by Tarcy Su
- "Freefall 跪了" by GBOYSWAG ft Julia Wu
- "Let's Be Together 最想見到你" by Ann
- "If You Say You Love Me 如果你說愛我" by F.I.R.
- "One Decade as One Day 十年如一日" by Yisa Yu
- "Not Anymore... 不讓你再" by Boon Hui Lu

== Broadcast ==
| Network | Country | Airing Date | Timeslot |
|---|---|---|---|
| TTV Main Channel | Taiwan | 2 Feb 2020 | Sunday 10:00-11:30 pm |
| Vidol | Taiwan | 2 Feb 2020 | Sunday 11:30 pm |
| iQiyi | Taiwan | 2 Feb 2020 | Sunday 12:00 am |
| Line TV | Taiwan | 2 Feb 2020 | Sunday 12:00 am |
| FriDay | Taiwan | | Uploaded in full after the conclusion of the series |
| Hami Video | Taiwan | | Uploaded in full after the conclusion of the series |
| myVideo | Taiwan | | Uploaded in full after the conclusion of the series |
| SET Metro | Taiwan | 8 Feb 2020 | Saturday 10:00-11:30 pm |
| Astro Go; VOD | Malaysia | 16 Feb 2020 | Sunday |
| Viki | Europe; America; India; Australia; New Zealand | 18 Feb 2020 | Tuesday |

== Ratings ==
Competing dramas on rival channels airing at the same time slot were:

- CTV - Someday Or One Day, In Time With You (re-run), Attention, Love! (re-run)
- CTS - I, Myself
- FTV - The Mirror

| Air Date | Chapter | Average Ratings | Rank |
|---|---|---|---|
| Feb 2, 2020 | 1 | 0.75 | 2 |
| Feb 9, 2020 | 2 | 0.80 | 2 |
| Feb 16, 2020 | 3 | 1.04 | 2 |
| Feb 23, 2020 | 4 | 1.07 | 1 |
| Mar 1, 2020 | 5 | 0.84 | 1 |
| Mar 8, 2020 | 6 | 0.90 | 1 |
| Mar 15, 2020 | 7 | 1.02 | 1 |
| Mar 22, 2020 | 8 | 1.03 | 1 |
| Mar 29, 2020 | 9 | 1.10 | 1 |
| Apr 5, 2020 | 10 | 1.15 | 1 |
| Apr 12, 2020 | 11 | 1.01 | 1 |
| Apr 19, 2020 | 12 | 1.01 | 1 |
| Apr 26, 2020 | 13 | 1.07 | 1 |
| May 3, 2020 | 14 | 0.95 | 1 |
| May 10, 2020 | 15 | 1.22 | 1 |
| May 17, 2020 | 16 | 1.14 | 1 |
| May 24, 2020 | 17 | 1.21 | 1 |
| May 31, 2020 | 18 | 1.51 | 1 |
| Average ratings | | 1.05 | -- |

- Numbers in red denote the highest rating and numbers in blue denote the lowest rating for the drama's tenure.
- Ratings are obtained from AGB Nielsen.
