= Sweet Combat =

- Genre: Romantic comedy; Teen drama; Sports
- Based on: Girls of the Wild's by Hun and Zhena (Kim Hye-jin)
- Written by: Ru Ping
- Directed by: Ke Hanchen
- Starring: Lu Han; Guan Xiaotong
- Country of origin: China
- Original language: Mandarin
- No. of seasons: 1
- No. of episodes: 37

Production
- Running time: 45 mins
- Production companies: Huace Media; Mango TV

Original release
- Network: Hunan TV
- Release: July 23 – August 13, 2018

Sweet Combat (Chinese: 甜蜜暴击) is a 2018 Chinese television series starring Lu Han and Guan Xiaotong. The series is based on the Korean manhwa Girls of the Wild's. The series aired on Hunan TV starting July 23, 2018.

== Synopsis ==
Ming Tian lives with his younger brother and sister because his mother left and his father died. Despite having no foundation in sports, he enrols at Zheng Ze University, a sports school known for giving out generous scholarships, after deciding to work several part-time jobs to fund his studies. There, he meets Fang Yu, the heir to a huge conglomerate who is being groomed to become the next successor. However, she has no interest in her family's business and is passionate about sports instead. Despite her grandfather's protests, she enrols at Zheng Ze University and becomes the school's mixed martial arts champion. Fang Yu is tasked with training Ming Tian, and the two fall in love during the training process. With the help of Fang Yu and their friends, Ming Tian grows to become a skilled sportsman.

== Cast ==
Actor	Character	Introduction
Lu Han	Ming Tian (明天)	The first male student of ZhengZe University. Originally he lived in Macau with his younger brother and sister until he was accepted by ZhengZe on a scholarship. A hard worker and honest person he hides his struggles from others behind a smile. Tian was trained at childhood by his Father who was a professional Boxer under the same tutelage as Cheng Yanan's Father. After his Father died in an accident and his mother abandoned him he raised his siblings by himself banning them from learning Martial Arts due how it affected his family. He met Fang Yu in Macau before transferring where they had a rocky first meeting. After encountering her again at ZhengZe they continue to argue due to their different backgrounds and misunderstandings. They eventually get along the more they get to know each other better and see different sides of themselves through their interactions. Tian becomes close friends with Cheng Yanan and Sun Hao; the second male student at ZhengZe, he's also friends with Song Xiaomi who wishes to be in a relationship with him. When the school's tournament prelims begin he begins to train for it after he encounters his high school bully Ma Yichen who humiliates him in front of his siblings and sends spoiled food to his home that his brother ate. He defeats Yichen and becomes more confident in himself and abilities. Eventually he falls for Fang Yu and tells Xiaomi after some advice he wishes to stay friends with her. Tian suffers attacks from Yu's suitor Wang Shiwei (chosen by Yu's Grandfather) who hates Tian for being poor and embarrassing him for his callous and pompous nature. Tian would have to fight Wu Ji; a Krav Maga fighter who beats Fang Yu viciously under Shiwei's orders. Tian uses the Death Strike technique his Father and Yanan's Father learned to win but Wu Ji in poor sportsmanship attacks Tian from behind knocking him off the stage and puts him in a coma for a few months. He's taken care of by Fang Yu and support from the school till he awakes. Yu's Grandfather would continue to try and separate them even going as low as to use Tian's Father and Yu's Uncle Ji Gang's history. The plan would succeed during the one-year gap till it was exposed that Ji Gang's wife used his death to commit insurance fraud framing Tian's Father for murder during their match thus exonerating Tian's Father and allowing him to move on with his life. He becomes the new Boxing Captain after Cheng Yanan and thanks to Yu's brother he meets up with Fang Yu who renews his relationship with her.
Guan Xiaotong	Fang Yu (方宇)	The main female protagonist. At a young age she was forced to wear boys clothes by her parents when she was being groomed to take over her Grandfather's company. After her brother was born she was allowed to wear girl's clothes but was called a freak by her peers due to them being unaware of her situation. After her parents death she was raised by Ji Gang who she called Uncle Ji till he died during his match with Ming Tian's Father. She trained heavily growing up in Mixed Martial Arts and become ZhengZe's Champion earning the nickname Queen. She met Ming Tian in Macau after she kicked an old woman's food cart; though it was to save a little girl who was about to be run over. At the university she doesn't get along with Tian at first due to him telling her off about her cold nature and refusal to fight back at others. She forces him as her opponent in the tournament prelims but suffers backlash from Cheng Yanan and Ming Tian for forcing her opinion and ways on Tian. She begins to fall for him when he starts making her feel emotions she never knew she had and how he cares for her in his own way. Thanks to Yanan she starts to try and earn Tian's feelings despite rivalry from Song Xiaomi. After many misunderstandings and doubts they begin to date much to the chagrin of her Grandfather and chosen suitor Wang Shiwei. After she humiliates Shiwei he hires Wu Ji to fight her (who already wanted to test his skills against her). She held her own during the beginning of the fight but loses due to her inexperience against the Krav Maga style. After Wu Ji blindsides Ming Tian she takes care of Tian during his coma where she emotionally breakdowns begging him to wake up. After his recovery they resume dating till her Grandfather interferes using Ji Gang's death as the catalyst. Using his late wife they spread lies about Tian's Father causing Yu to hate Tian's Father more and hold Tian responsible. She leaves to study abroad to help with her Grandfather's company, but after the year gap she returns to visit her friends and family where she learns the truth about Ji Gang's death and how her Grandfather was involved in the scam to break her up with Ming Tian. She leaves after giving him a stern lecture about messing with her personal life and guilt about how she treated Ming Tian's Father and is reunited with Tian who reignites their relationship.
Pei Zitian	Sun Hao (孙浩)	The second male student at ZhengZe. A Brawler whose fighting style earned him the nickname King of Streetfighting, he works with his Mother at their food stall and has a dog named Best Fighter. He loves animals and is reliable to those he's friends with as shown with Song Xiaomi when he tries helping her with Ming Tian and housing Tian's siblings when they lose their home. He wins his first match in the tournament prelims but loses to Luo GuanYan due to his streetfighting style being predictable. He originally had a crush on Fang Yu but after spending time with Xiaomi and comforting her when Tian wishes to stay friends he starts falling for Xiaomi but has a hard time telling her. After advice with his mom he finally opens up to Xiaomi and starts dating her. Towards the end of the series he and Cheng Yanan arrange for their parents to meet and after the year gap they marry each other making Sun Hao and Yanan brother and sister and their parents giving birth to their baby half brother.
Ivy Shao	Song Xiaomi (宋小米)	President of ZhengZe University's Taekwondo group. She's a happy go lucky person who loves to cook and wear fashionable clothes and makeup with cat ear berets. She has a Frenemy relationship with Cheng Yanan often calling her Glutton Yan or poking fun at her tomboy looks. She has a crush on Ming Tian who becomes the first boy she makes an effort to earn his affection honestly. She becomes close to his siblings and is the one who spends the most time with them including visiting Tian's home to cook. She helps train Tian for the tournament prelims and along with Fang Yu and Cheng Yanan defends him from Ma Yichen's gang who wanted revenge for losing at the prelims. She hangs out with Sun Hao to scheme with him to get Ming Tian and Fang Yu for Sun Hao but after Tian wishes to stay friends she dates Sun Hao after realizing how much closer they are to each other. Xiaomi is the one who helps start the investigation into Ji Gang's death after she overheard his wife talk about insurance fraud to a friend which leads to Tian's Father being cleared of the charges of Ji Gang's deaths.
Zhao Yue	Luo GuanYan (骆冠言)	President of Zhiying University's Boxing group. A strict senior during practice but is a gentle and warm person in general and hates the idea of boxing being used for bullying. He develops a crush on Cheng Yanan much to the confusion of his team. He learns of Ma Yichen's bullying against Ming Tian and is disgusted with his actions to the point he forfeits his match against Tian in the prelims to allow Tian to get his retribution against Yichen. He began training under Yanan's Father prior to the prelims and still does afterwards. His affections for Yanan prove to be real despite setbacks from his former teammate He Xiaofeng who had a crush on him. He's the first to encounter Wu Ji who challenged him to a match to test his skills. Although his boxing proved superior he would lose due to Wu Ji's ruthlessness. He helped to locate Ming Tian when Wu Ji kidnaps him and leads Zhiying in helping with the charity for support of Tian's recovery. After the year gap he transfers to ZhengZe and openly dates Cheng Yanan. .
Li Mengmeng	Cheng Yanan (程亚楠)	President of ZhengZe University's Boxing group. She's a tomboy with short hair, loves to Skateboard and eat delicious food. She usually gets confused for being a boy even by Ming Tian at first when he transferred to ZhengZe on his first day. She is best friends with Fang Yu and gives her advice about feelings and dealing with Ming Tian, she also has a frenemy relationship with Song Xiaomi while they get along they still argue and fight with each other when it involves Ming Tian. She does her best to stop Xiaomi from getting close to Ming Tian to allow Fang Yu to continue her time with him but fails at times when Xiaomi entices her with food. She is caught of guard by Luo GuanYan having feelings for her and tries to dismiss them but starts to fall for him the more he continues to prove his feelings are real. She's one of Ming Tian's trainers along with Song Xiaomi during his preparation for the tournament prelims and helps with his bullies when they threaten him. She wishes to learn the Death Strike technique from her Father but he refuses revealing it led to her mother's death as it was never meant to be taught to women. Along with Sun Hao they help arrange their parents to court one another leading to them marrying and giving birth to her baby brother after the year gap. She becomes the younger sister to Sun Hao.
Bu Kang	Ma Yichen	Member of Zhiying University's Boxing group. Ming Tian's high-school classmate. He tries to hide his inferiority complex by bullying the weak. After he sees Ming Tian with his siblings he humiliates him in front of them even sends spoiled food to his home after Ming Tian stands up to him but backfires when Tian's brother eats it getting food poisoning and earning both Ming Tian's wrath and Luo GuanYan's disgust for his actions. Ming Tian beats him in the tournament prelims but doesn't accept he lost fair believing Tian is still weaker than him going as far as to bring his gang to Tian's house with bats for revenge but is driven off by Fang Yu, Cheng Yanan, and Song Xiaomi. He later changes his ways when he becomes tired of being called weak by his peers and bullying ways asking Luo GuanYan help to train him as a proper boxer and sportsman repairing their friendship. He helps Fang Yu and the others locate Ming Tian when he is kidnapped due to his acquaintance with Wang Shiwei and with the charity for Tian's recovery. He becomes the third captain of the boxing team of his school after the year gap and has become a better person who doesn't bully anyone anymore leading by GuanYan's example.
He Meixuan	He Xiaofeng	Vice-president of Zhiying University's Boxing group. A sensitive and weak girl despite her tough exterior. She has a rivalry with Fang Yu and likes Luo GuanYan. She constantly tries to challenge Fang Yu but usually ends up failing. She doesn't understand GuanYan's strict beliefs of sportsmanship and anti-bullying methods but begins to see his ways after he endures his punishment for purposely forfeiting during the prelims. She has a dislike for Cheng Yanan due to her feelings for GuanYan and tries to belittle her but concedes afterwards when it becomes clear his feelings are real. She becomes the second boxing captain after GuanYan and later hands the title over to Yichen.
Wang Jia	Wang Shiwei	A rich second-generation heir. Fang Yu's marriage partner. He met her during childhood but called her a freak when she wore a dress for the first time after Fang Yu was forced to wear boys clothes by her late parents. He also uses bullying and dirty tactics against Ming Tian and was the one who informed Fang Yu's grandfather about their relationship. He is arrested along with Wu Ji after Ming Tian's kidnapping and Wu Ji putting Ming Tian in the hospital.
TNT Ding Chengxin	Fang Zhou	Fang Yu's younger brother. CEO of Fang Incorporation. Highly intelligent and loves videos games. He is very supportive and protective of his sister always trying to help her and let her have fun with her friends while running the company. He hates their Grandfather's sternness to Fang Yu and how he tries to force her to obey his rules. He buys gifts and food for his peers to earn their respect and doesn't like physical activities though he has shown he can hold his own against Ming Tian in sparring. He helps Ming Tian gaining his home back after his Grandfather took it away along with Ming Tian's jobs even uncovering the insurance fraud by Ji Gang's wife when his Grandfather paid her off to make Ming Tian's father look bad to help separate him. After the truth is exposed he tells his grandfather to leave Fang Yu's love life alone before he loses her completely which he takes to heart.
Zhang Wan'er	Ming Zhu	Ming Tian's sister who loves her brother. She and Ming Lang want to learn martial arts but are not allowed due to Ming Tian forbidding it. He lets them train and even had Fang Yu help on her free time. She and her brother both like Fang Yu and Song Xiaomi and wish for Ming Tian to choose one of them.
Xu Wailuo	Ming Lang	Ming Tian's Younger brother. He like his sister love their brother and wish to learn martial arts but is not allowed by Ming Tian till he eventually lets them. He cares about Ming Tian and hates it when he doesn't fight back for their sake against his childhood bully. He and his sister always scheme to get Ming Tian to date Fang Yu or Song Xiaomi but are happy to see he chooses Fang Yu
Tien Niu	Hao Ma	Sun Hao's mother. Called Mama Hao by everyone for her loving and caring nature she runs a food stall and is a single parent. She is supportive of Sun Hao and isn't afraid to set him straight when he becomes depressed or embarrasses himself. She cares for Ming Tian and his siblings and loves having them around. She gives advice to Ming Tian and Song Xiaomi when they need help with their feelings. She houses Tian and siblings when they become homeless and drives off the shady buyers who try to clear her out of her business when Fang Yu's Grandfather tries to hurt those close to Ming Tian. She becomes the affections of Cheng Yanan's father after he sees the birth marks on her foot and thanks to their kids she marries him and gives birth to her second son becoming Cheng Yanan's stepmother.
Guan Zhaoceng	(commonly called Xiao Zhang, or Principal)	Principal of ZhengZe. He constantly tries to keep Ming Tian to stay at the academy always making accommodations for him and eventually Sun Hao. He wishes for Ming Tian to participate in the schools tournament activities and when handing out punishments for breaking school rules it's usually a ploy to get Ming Tian to get involved in school matches. He leaves the academy at the end due to a promise he made to teach abroad when Ming Tian recovers from coma.
Wei Zhongkai	(commonly called Zhu Ren, or Director)	Department head of ZhengZe. He cares greatly for his students and their education. He was the one who came up with the idea to let male students into the academy to help the girls learn to become more feminine when they graduate. He constantly tries to keep his top students to be role models and keep them safe. He loves coffee and tea and Tai Chi. He is on friendly terms with the Principal of Zhiying and has a friendly competitiveness with him.
Zhang Shuangli	Fang Shuo	Fang Yu's strict grandfather. He wishes the best for both his company and his grandchildren but disapproves of Ming Tian. He loves his grandchildren but isn't afraid to use underhanded methods to keep them from straying from his company. He starts buying the property of Ming Tian's jobs, home, and even attempts to get Hao Ma's food stall but fails. He uses Ji Gang's wife to fabricate a lie about Ji's death to make Ming Tian's Father look bad but is found out after the truth is exposed by Fang Zhou and Song Xiaomi and has a heart to heart with Fang Yu about her life and his inability to let her be free. He his left feeling guilty when he realizes he has done great harm to her and Ming Tian after Fang Zhou tells him he needs to let go or lose Fang Yu forever.
Yi Shaode	Cheng Dafu	Cheng Yanan's father. He runs a boxing gym and is a bit of a goofball. He loves his daughter and is proud of her skill and accomplishments. He takes GuanYan as an apprentice and approves of his feelings for Yanan. He was an apprentice alongside Ming Tian's Father revealing it to Ming Tian after seeing him fight at the prelims and Tian coming to his gym. He and Tian's Father both learned the Death Strike technique which he refuses to teach his daughter after his wife used it which lead to her death due to the strain it causes women. He teaches Ming Tian the Death Strike during Tian's fight with Wu Ji but feels guilty after Tian goes into a coma offering to house his siblings during the recovery. He pursues Sun Hao's mother after seeing a North Star birth mark on her foot but develops real feelings for her after getting to know her better. He marries her in the end both giving birth to their newborn son and becoming Sun Hao's Stepfather.
Yang Xiaotong	Zhang Chunhua	A senior in ZhengZe University who was the first Champion during her tenure and acts as the school's rule enforcer and guidance counselor. She gives advice to the others and is in charge of the bodyguards during competitions and the transfer post. She helped with the advice for Fang Yu when she was dealing with her feelings Ming Tian and Ming Tian when he was figuring out his relationship with Song Xiaomi. When Tian goes into a coma she led the charity events with the students for Tian's hospital bills and support even giving up her favorite hobby eating meat as her pledge for his recovery.

== Production ==
The series engaged former Chinese taekwondo competitor Chen Zhong to be its consultant.

The series was filmed at Shenchuan and Macau from June to September 2017.

== Soundtrack ==
No.	Title	Lyrics	Music	Singers	Length
1.	"A Fearless Tomorrow (无畏的明天)" (Opening theme song)	Zhangjian Junwei	Oliver, Zhangjian Junwei	Bii
2.	"Stars and Moon (星月)"	Victor Lau	Victor Lau	Ivy Shao
3.	"How to Love (怎样去爱)"	Skot Suyama, Maggie Fu	Skot Suyama	Ivy Shao
