= Kimi Hsia =

Taiwanese actress

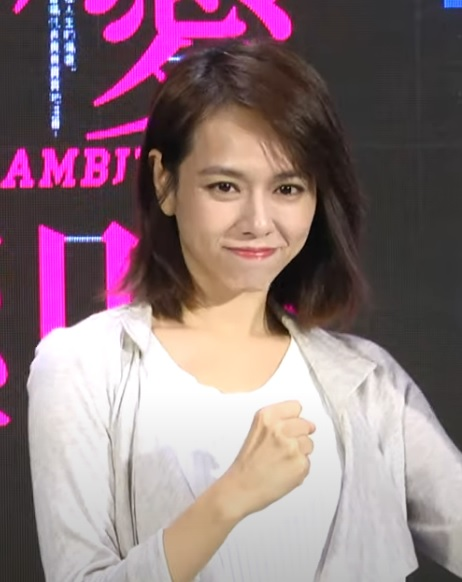
- Hsia in November 2019
- Born: Hsia Yu-chiao (夏郁喬); 24 August 1984 (age 42); Taipei, Taiwan
- Other names: 夏雨喬; Xia Yu-qiao; Shia Yu-chiau; Chiao Chiao; Qiao Qiao
- Occupations: Actress; television host
- Years active: 2000–present
- Spouse: Tom Lin Shu-yu (m. 2019)

Chinese name
- Traditional Chinese: 夏于喬
- Simplified Chinese: 夏于乔
- Hanyu Pinyin: Xià Yúqiáo

Kimi Hsia Yu-chiao (Chinese: 夏于喬; pinyin: Xià Yúqiáo; born 24 August 1984) is a Taiwanese actress and television host. She is best known for hosting the SET Metro variety shows Delicious Food All Over the World and Stylish Man – The Chef.

== Career ==
Hsia was discovered by producer Wang Wei-chung when she was 15. She participated in the show Guess and won first place in the junior high school beauty contest segment and was signed by Wang's company.

In 2013 she starred, alongside Tony Yang and Lin Mei-hsiu, in the film Zone Pro Site, which topped the Taiwanese box office for four consecutive weeks. She has also appeared in television series such as The Pawnshop No. 8 (2003), The Queen of SOP (2012), What Is Love (2012), Rock N' Road (2014) and Thirty Something (2015).

== Filmography ==
=== Television series ===
Year	English title	Original title	Role	Notes
2001	My Family	我們一家都性福		
2001	Poor Prince	貧窮貴公子	Mei Sui	
2001	Marmalade Boy	橘子醬男孩		Cameo
2002	Come To My Place	來我家吧	Tung Li-chia	
2002	Spicy Student	麻辣高校生	Ouyang Mingtzu	
2002	Online Hero	天下無雙	Mao Mao	
2002	Purple Corner	紫色角落		
2003	The Pawnshop No. 8	第8號當舖	Chung Hsiao-chieh	
2003	Hi Working Girl	Hi 上班女郎	Mei	
2004	Eternity: A Chinese Ghost Story	倩女幽魂	Xia Xiaoxue	
2004	Magic Ring	愛情魔戒	Peng Hsiao-chun	
2005	Small Person	人小鬼大劉羅鍋	Yu Gege	
2005	Horror Fantasies	驚異傳奇－意外的訪客	Hsiao Hsueh	
2006	A Game About Love	剪刀石頭布	Yeh To-hsin	
2006	Angel	假面天使	Liu Hsi-ling	
2007	Wonderful Coffee	兩個門牌一個家	Ho Mei-chih	
2009	Mango Dreamer	流漂子	Ke Ling-fen	
2011	Ring Ring Bell	真心請按兩次鈴	Jen Tien-hsin	
2012	What Is Love	花是愛	Wu Hsiao-lu	
2012	The Queen of SOP	S.O.P女王 / 勝女的代價	Li Chia-yi	
2013	Kiss Me Mom!	媽，親一下	Tien Hsin-mei	
2014	Rock N' Road	A咖的路	Lin Wei-chen	
2015	Aquarius	星座愛情水瓶女	Ke You-rong	
2015	Marry Me, or Not?	必娶女人	Hsu Ching-ju	Cameo
2015	Thirty Something	我的30定律	Ho Mei-liang	
2016	In Love – Scent	滾石愛情故事－味道	Miao-miao	
2018	Schrodinger's Cat	薛丁格的貓	Chen Hsiao-tieh	
2019	Hate the Sin, Love the Sinner	噬罪者	Shen Wen-ching	
2019	Best Interest	最佳利益	Luo Si-tong	Cameo
2019	Endless Love	天堂的微笑	Lin Wei-zhen	Cameo
2022	Women in Taipei	台北女子圖鑑	Hsu Hui-ru	
2024	Let's Talk About Chu	愛愛內含光	Qiu Wei	

=== Film ===
Year	English title	Original title	Role	Notes
2005	Bad Moon	惡月	Amy	
2006	Open to Midnight	午夜照相館	Yu	
2013	Will You Still Love Me Tomorrow?	明天記得愛上我	Mandy	
2013	Zone Pro Site	總鋪師	Chan Hsiao-wan	
2014	Endless Nights in Aurora	極光之愛	Yuan Yuan	
2015	Just Get Married	結婚禁行曲	Lin Bing-bing	Television
2015	Goldfish Mother	金魚媽媽	Lin Chia-yi	Television
2017	Turn Around	老師，你會不會回來	Ms. Hsiao-lun	
2018	Ai, Ni Xiang Shuo Shen Me	愛，你想說什麼		Short film
2018	The Rope Curse	粽邪	Lin Shu-yi	
2019	Nina Wu	灼人秘密	Girl No.3	
2020	The Rope Curse 2	馗降：粽邪2	Lin Shu-yi	
2021	American Girl	美國女孩	Ms. Su	
2022	Fantasy·World	童話·世界	Jian Yun	
2022	Girls, Be Ambitious!	女優，摔吧！	Ai	
2024	Yen and Ai-Lee	小雁與吳愛麗	Yen	

=== Variety show ===
Year	English title	Original title	Network	Notes
2007	Red Dream	台北紅樓夢	CTi Variety	Host
2007–2011	Delicious Food All Over the World	美食大三通	SET Metro	Host
2008–2017	Stylish Man – The Chef	型男大主廚	SET Metro	Host
2009	Treasure Hunter	冒險奇兵	SET Metro	Host
2011–2012	iWalker	愛玩客	SET Metro	Host
2012	University	大學生了沒	CTi Variety	Guest host
2012	Star vs Landlord	明星鬥地主	Tudou	Host
2013	Apple E-News	蘋果娛樂一週	Next TV	Host
2014	Super Citizen	最強大國民	CTV	Guest host

=== Music video appearances ===
Year	Artist	Song title
2000	Tony Fish	"Color Song"
2000	Mayday	"Nobody Else In My Heart"
2010	A-do	"Fear No More"
2011	Kenji Wu	"What I Can Give"
2014	Eric Chou	"Come Out Your Way"
2015	Esther Liu	"Thank of Myself"
2017	Princess Ai	"It's No Big Deal"
2018	Rennie Wang	"My Answer"
2019	Matilda Tao	"Yin Wei You Ni"
2019	Matilda Tao	"Wo Bu Yao Duo Xing Fu"
2019	Nicky Lee	"The Best in the Worst"
2019	Nicky Lee	"No Longer Human"
2019	Mayday	"Tenderness #MaydayBlue20th"
2021	Katncandix2	"I Often Think Of You"
2021	Katncandix2	"Say Cheese"

== Theater ==
Year	English title	Original title
2008	Stand by Me	六義幫
2009	Legitimate Crimes	合法犯罪
2011	Apocalypse of Beijing Theater	京戲啟示錄
2017	Roommate	室友

== Songwriting credits ==
Year	Artist	Album	Song	Notes
2013	Zhao Pengfei	Shuí jiā ài mèi	"Qiáo jiā huā huā"	Lyrics (rap)

== Published works ==
- Hsia, Kimi (2007). I'm Hsia Yu-chiao. Taipei: Booker Publications. ISBN 9789867010346.

== Awards and nominations ==
Year	Award	Category	Nominated work	Result	Ref.
2011	46th Golden Bell Awards	Best Host in an Itinerant Show	Delicious Food All Over the World	Nominated	
2011	46th Golden Bell Awards	Best Host in a Comprehensive Show	Stylish Man – The Chef	Won	
2014	49th Golden Bell Awards	Best Host in a Comprehensive Show	Stylish Man – The Chef	Nominated	
2023	58th Golden Bell Awards	Best Leading Actress in a Miniseries or Television Film	On Marriage: Mary's Merry Marriage	Nominated	
2024	61st Golden Horse Awards	Best Leading Actress	Yen and Ai-Lee	Nominated	
