= I Am Married...But! =

Taiwanese Netflix television series

Chinese name
- Traditional Chinese: 童話故事下集
- Simplified Chinese: 童话故事下集
Transcriptions
Standard Mandarin
- Hanyu Pinyin: Tóng hùa gù shì xìa jí
- Genre: Romantic comedy Romance
- Written by: Li Nien-hsiu
- Directed by: Li Nien-hsiu
- Starring: Ko Chia-yen; Jasper Liu; Ko Shu-chin; Tseng Jing-hua; Fu Meng-po; Pipi Yao; Sie Yi-lin
- Country of origin: Taiwan
- Original language: Taiwanese Mandarin
- No. of seasons: 1
- No. of episodes: 12

Production
- Producers: Iza Sun; Vita Huang
- Running time: 29-49 minutes
- Production company: Deal Entertainment Inc.

Original release
- Network: Netflix
- Release: 14 February 2025

I Am Married...But! (Chinese: 童話故事下集; pinyin: Tóng hùa gù shì xìa jí) is a 2025 Taiwanese Netflix original series written and directed by Li Nien-hsiu. The series stars Ko Chia-yen, Jasper Liu, Ko Shu-chin, Tseng Jing-hua, Fu Meng-po, Pipi Yao and Sie Yi-lin.

== Reception ==
Melissa Camacho of Common Sense Media praised the series for "humorously highlight[ing] how love and marriage are glamorized by media" and said this is "a solid option" for people "looking for some laughs".
