= White Ant =

- Theatrical release poster
- Directed by: Chu Hsien-che
- Written by: Chu Hsien-che
- Produced by: Mark Chen
- Starring: Wu Kang-jen; Aviis Zhong; Yu Tai-yan
- Cinematography: Lei Heng
- Edited by: Cheng Hsiao-tung
- Music by: Wu Chia-feng
- Production companies: Big Houses Film Production; Content Digital Film Co.
- Distributed by: Ablaze Image
- Release dates: 10 October 2016 (Busan); 17 March 2017 (Taiwan)
- Running time: 95 minutes
- Country: Taiwan
- Language: Mandarin
- Box office: NT$1.5 million (Taiwan)

White Ant (Chinese: 白蟻─慾望謎網) is a 2016 Taiwanese drama film and the narrative feature film debut of Chu Hsien-che, who worked as a documentarian for more than 20 years prior to White Ant. The film stars Wu Kang-jen, Aviis Zhong and Yu Tai-yan.

== Premise ==
Bai Yide is a young bookstore worker living alone in a Taipei neighborhood. Unknown to anyone else, the socially inept Bai has an uncontrollable fetish for women's underwear due to a traumatic past event. One day, he receives a video recording of himself caught in the act of stealing female lingerie, leading to a gradually accumulating sense of anxiety and fear of exposure with tragic consequences.

== Cast ==
- Wu Kang-jen as Bai Yide
- Aviis Zhong as Tang Junhong
- Yu Tai-yan as Lan Tangyuan, Bai Yide's mother

== Reception ==
Elizabeth Kerr of The Hollywood Reporter stated, "Carefully modulated and wisely attuned to its strongest elements, White Ant is evidence of Chu's doc background, both in style and substance." She concluded that the film is "a strong exploration of the psychological impact of shame, fear and guilt".

== Awards and nominations ==
Award ceremony	Category	Recipients	Result
21st Busan International Film Festival	FIPRESCI Prize	White Ant	Won
53rd Golden Horse Awards	Best New Director	Chu Hsien-che	Nominated
1st Malaysia Golden Global Awards	Best Film	White Ant	Nominated
1st Malaysia Golden Global Awards	Best New Director	Chu Hsien-che	Nominated
1st Malaysia Golden Global Awards	Best Screenplay	Chu Hsien-che	Nominated
1st Malaysia Golden Global Awards	Best Cinematography	Lei Heng	Nominated
27th Singapore International Film Festival	Silver Screen Award for Best Asian Feature Film	White Ant	Nominated
19th Taipei Film Awards	Best Actor	Wu Kang-jen	Won
