= Rock N' Road =

2014 Taiwanese television series

- Promotional poster
- Also known as: A-List Road A咖之路
- A咖的路
- Genre: Music, romance, comedy
- Created by: TVBS
- Written by: Feng Bo Di 馮勃棣; Wang Yu Qing 王雨晴; Yue Hui 月彙; Zhan Xiao Mi 詹小米
- Directed by: Lin Zi Ping 林子平
- Starring: Chris Wu; Kimi Hsia; Mike Lee 李政穎; Nita Lei 雷瑟琳
- Opening theme: You're the Only One 你是唯一 by Mayday 五月天
- Ending theme: Soon, Happiness 快樂快了 by Jia Jia 家家
- Country of origin: Taiwan
- Original languages: Mandarin; Taiwanese
- No. of seasons: 1
- No. of episodes: 16

Production
- Executive producer: Guo Jian Hong 郭建宏
- Producers: Zhang Man Na 張曼娜; Qiu Yu Ting 邱玉婷
- Production location: Taiwan
- Running time: 90 minutes
- Production companies: TVBS 聯意製作股份有限公司; TransWorld Production Co. 映畫傳播事業股份有限公司

Original release
- Network: CTS; TVBS
- Release: 16 March 2014 – 6 July 2015

Related
- Kiss Me Mom! 媽，親一下！; The Way We Were 16個夏天

Rock N' Road (Chinese: A咖的路; pinyin: A kā de lù) is a 2014 Taiwanese romantic musical comedy television series created and produced by TVBS. It stars Chris Wu, Kimi Hsia, Mike Lee and Nita Lei. The original title literally translates to "A-List Road", which is in reference to the billing status of a celebrity. Filming began on 7 February 2014 and wrapped up on 19 June 2014; the drama was filmed as it aired. First original broadcast began on 16 March 2014 on CTS, airing every Sunday night at 10:00-11:30 pm and then 22 March 2014 on TVBS airing every Saturday night at 9:00-10:30 pm. The last of the 16 episodes aired on 6 July 2014.

== Synopsis ==
Lin Wei Zhen was a former teen singing sensation, but found herself upstaged by Zhou Shu Yu and his band during a New Year's performance in 2006 because she arrived late to the show. Since then her fame and career has diminished. She now finds herself going from amateur auditions to auditions trying to break back into the music industry. Zhou Shu Yu has since become one of the most successful and sought after music producers and songwriters in Asia. His longtime girlfriend Yang Jia Xin is also a popular singer and songwriters, but when Jia Xin falls into a creative slump she steals a song written by Wei Zhen's late father and passes it off as her own. Shu Yu finds out about Jia Xin plagiarizing Wei Zhen's song and sides with Wei Zhen. Unhappy that Shu Yu does not support her in her success with the new song she and Shu Yu's former bandmate and now manager Xu Da Li, both turn against Shu Yu causing him to lose everything he has worked so hard for. With only Wei Zhen by his side, Shu Yu helps her become the A-Lister she so highly sought after to become.

== Cast ==
=== Main cast ===
- Chris Wu as Zhou Shu Yu 周書宇
- Kimi Hsia as Lin Wei Zhen 林維真
- Mike Lee as Xu Da Li 徐立達
- Nita Lei as Yang Jia Xin 楊佳欣

=== Supporting cast ===
- Mami Gu 古欣玉 as Lai Qian Nei 賴千芮
- Bernice Wang 王寶第 as Ivy
- Simon Twu 涂世旻 as Wang Mu Qun 王牧群
- Jeanine Yang 楊晴 as Zhuang Qiao Ru 莊巧如
- Chin Shih-chieh 金士傑 as Ge Zhong Ming 葛仲明
- Wang Chuan 王琄 as Li Mei Nu 李美女
- Allison Lin 林予晞 as Guan Guan 關關
- Ji Jun Wei 紀峻崴 as Ah Song 阿松
- Ma Nien-hsien 馬念先 as Ma Ding Ni 馬丁尼
- Zhang Pei Hua 張佩華 as Lai Du Cheng 賴篤成
- Grace Ko 葛蕾 as Zheng Shu Hua 鄭淑華
- Dong Ye 東野 as Ah Xiu 阿修
- Ann An 安思瑋 as Ann
- Chris Downs 夏克立 as Mei Da Duo 梅大鐸
- Cathy Chung 鍾欣怡 as young Bai Hui Lan 少年白蕙蘭

=== Guest role ===
- Coco Lee 李玟 as herself
- Della Ding Dang 丁噹 as herself
- Yen-J 嚴爵 as himself
- Daniel Luo 羅時豐 as Taxi driver
- Cai Ming Xiu 蔡明修 as County Chief
- Joseph Ma 馬國賢 as himself
- Liu Xiang Jun 劉香君 as Shop owner
- Yao Hung 洪敬堯 as himself
- Jesse Tang as herself
- Roger Wang 王中平 as Lin Yu Liang
- Jacko Chiang 蔣偉文 as TV show host
- Chung Hsin-yu as herself
- Linda Chien 簡愷樂 as Kai Lok
- Jia Jia 家家 as herself
- Plungon 浩角翔起 as themselves
- Snow Liao 廖盈婷 as News anchor
- Fan Shi Xuan 范時軒 as TV show host
- Chu Chung Heng 屈中恆 as Paul Lan
- Michael Zhang 張勛傑 as Aaron

== Soundtrack ==
- You're the One and Only 你是唯一 by Mayday 五月天
- Happiness Coming 快樂快了 by Jia Jia 家家
- Heartbroken People Should Not Listen to Slow Songs 傷心的人別聽慢歌 by Mayday 五月天
- Onion 洋蔥 by Mayday 五月天
- Rolling Cart 軋車 by Mayday 五月天
- Loving to Wash Shrimps 愛洗蝦米 by Won Fu 旺福
- Backpackers 背包客 by Won Fu 旺福
- Salary Man's Diary 小職員日記 by Won Fu 旺福
- Singing for Lonely Souls 為你的寂寞唱歌 by Jia Jia 家家
- Pajama Party 睡衣Party by Jia Jia 家家
- Chocolate 巧克力 by Jia Jia 家家
- Friends 朋友 by Chris Wu 吳慷仁 & Kimi Hsia 夏于喬
- Gold Rush Years 淘金歲月 by Plungon 浩角翔起
- Get Rid of It 甩開 by Della Ding Dang 丁噹
- In the Spring 春天裡 by Della Ding Dang 丁噹
- To Insist 堅持 by Chris Wu 吳慷仁

== Broadcast ==
Network	Country	Airing Date	Timeslot
CTS	Taiwan	16 March 2014	Sunday 10:00-11:30 pm
TVBS	Taiwan	22 March 2014	Saturday 9:00-10:30 pm

== Episode ratings ==
Competing dramas on rival channels airing at the same time slot were:
- CTV - Master's Sun, Say I Love You
- FTV - First Kiss, You Light Up My Star
- SETTV - Deja Vu, Fall in Love with Me

Air Date	Episode	Average Ratings	Rank
16 March 2014	1	0.61	3
23 March 2014	2	0.56	3
30 March 2014	3	0.49	4
6 April 2014	4	0.51	4
13 April 2014	5	0.40	4
20 April 2014	6	0.55	4
27 April 2014	7	0.61	3
4 May 2014	8	0.63	3
11 May 2014	9	0.57	4
18 May 2014	10	0.69	3
25 May 2014	11	0.70	3
1 June 2014: Airing of "2014 Hito Music Awards"
8 June 2014	12	0.66	3
15 June 2014	13	0.48	4
22 June 2014	14	0.51	4
29 June 2014	15	0.52	3
6 July 2014	16	0.61	2
Average ratings		0.57	
