= Wu Kang-ren =

Taiwanese actor and model

- 吳慷仁
- Wu on November 25, 2023
- Born: 24 November 1982 (age 43); Kaohsiung, Taiwan
- Other name: Wu Kang-jen
- Education: National Taiwan University of Arts (BFA)
- Occupations: Actor; model
- Years active: 2007–present
- Agent: Easy Entertainment (2024–present)

Chinese name
- Traditional Chinese: 吳慷仁
- Simplified Chinese: 吴慷仁
- Hanyu Pinyin: Wú Kāng-rén
- Wade–Giles: Wu K'ang-jên
- Hokkien POJ: Ngô͘ Khóng-jîn

Wu Kang-ren (Chinese: 吳慷仁; pinyin: Wú Kāng-rén; born 24 November 1982), is a Taiwanese actor. He debuted in the short film Fragile in Love: Poetry in Motion in 2007 and gained wider recognition for his role in the 2009 television series Autumn's Concerto. He won the Golden Horse Award for Best Leading Actor for Abang Adik (2023) and the Golden Bell Award for Best Male Lead in a Television Series for Living (2023).

== Early life ==
Wu was born on November 24, 1982, in a military dependents' village in Kaohsiung, Taiwan, with his family roots in Anhui. His parents divorced when he was young, after which he lived with his mother. He began working at 14, after graduating from junior high school, to support his family. Initially, he tried his hand as an on-site construction welder despite his lack of experience, which resulted in eye burns. He later worked in various jobs, including restaurants, stalls, and supermarkets and enrolled into the Kaohsiung Municipal Chung-Cheng Industrial High School, where he balanced work with studies. He enlisted in Taiwan’s mandatory military service immediately after graduation. After completing his conscription at the age of 24, he moved from Kaohsiung to Taipei, where he worked as a bartender for three years. At 27, he was discovered by director Li Qiyuan, who helped him break into the entertainment industry.

== Career ==
=== 2007–2009: Beginnings ===
He started his career as an ad model. Later, he enrolled into an acting program at National Taiwan University of Arts and moved to being an actor. He made his debut performance in Fragile in Love: Poetry in Motion (沿海岸线徵友). Directed by Mickey Chen and Chi Chen Jun, the short film was featured at The LGBT Civil Rights Movement Film Festival and at the Tokyo International Lesbian & Gay Film Festival among others. His first television miniseries came the afterwards in Talking With You Boyfriend's Ex-Girlfriend (與男友的前女友密談). The mini-series was awarded the Best Mini-series Screenplay Award and the Best Editing Award at the 43rd Golden Bell Awards in 2008. The same year, he was cast in Hong Kong film Miao Miao with actors Ko Chia-yen and Wing Fan. The film was selected at the 2009 Melbourne International Film Festival, but it was later pulled out due to controversies about China's boycott against the film festival, as well as premiering at the 59th Berlin International Film Festival. The film was also screened at the 11th Taipei Film Festival.

In 2009, Talking With You Boyfriend's Ex-Girlfriend's director Chen Hui Jing cast him once again in his first idol drama Autumn's Concerto starring Vanness Wu and Ady An, where he played the role of Hua Tuoye. In later years, he stated that he was often reprimanded by Li Qiyuan as he had difficulties delivering his lines well in shootings. The series was received favorably by viewers.

=== 2010–2015: Recognition ===
Wu started to receive more television and film projects. In TTV's Zhong Wu Yan, he played the character of Howard, a blind man who finds love in Wu Yen, played by Cheryl Yang. He also starred in When Love Comes which garnered multiple nominations from different award-giving ceremonies.

During the press conference of TTV's Local Hero in 2011, Wu stated that he accidentally injured his left hand while shooting. He still participated in their scheduled charity event game that requires peeling fruits despite his hand injury, nevertheless, because he stated that he wanted the kids to enjoy. A year later, he was cast in four more television series. Among them is TTV's What Is Love co starring Jade Chou.

In 2012, Wu was cast in the role of Rong Guang, a farmer raising his son as a single parent, in the film The Third Wish. In preparation for the role, who is a skinny farmer to be diagnosed of Amyotrophic lateral sclerosis (ALS), Wu started running 5-kilometer races in the hot sun, and ate only boiled eggs and guava. He lost 8 kilograms of weight in 10 days. He also started acting as a father to child actor Chen Yu-cheng a week before filming began to study the father-and-son's lifestyle.

I was not born an actor... These experiences (doing manual labor jobs at a young age) made me aware of how money is earned that I try my best to be a hardworking actor. — Wu Kang-jen

In January, Wu was cast in TTV's King Flower co-starring James Wen and Nikki Hsieh. He played the character role of Ouyang Tai, the GM of Shen Da Realty who was engaged to Du Liang Yan, but was later killed by accident. The series consistently topped the viewers' ratings during its timeslot, garnering a 1.57 total average by the end of the series. Before the year ended, his performance in the 2012 TV series Emerging Light (愛在旭日升起時) earned him the Best Actor in a Leading Role award at the 18th Asian Television Awards, his first acting award, on December 5, 2013 in Singapore.

In 2014, he played the role of Zhou Shu Yu and David in Rock N' Road and Winnie the Boob (小胸維妮的幸福旅程), respectively. He was once again paired with Judy Chou, his co-star in What Is Love, in the latter series. He also acted alongside Ella Chen in The Lying Game (謊言遊戲) towards the end of the year.

=== 2016–present: Acclaim ===
From late 2015 to early 2016, he starred in the period drama A Touch of Green as a young fighter pilot, for which he won the Award for Best Actor in a Leading Role at the Golden Bell Awards 2016. In 2023, he won the Golden Horse Award for Best Leading Actor for his performance in Abang Adik. In 2024, Wu signed with Easy Entertainment, marking his first agency partnership in a decade and expanding his career into mainland China. This decision sparked controversy in both mainland China and Taiwan, given his past involvement in the Sunflower Student Movement and his advocacy for Taiwan's film and TV industry. Amid the controversy, he won the award for Best Male Lead in a Television Series for his performance in Living at the 59th Golden Bell Awards, a ceremony he missed, citing scheduling conflicts due to TV drama shooting in Shanghai. The next month, after initially claiming he would not attend, Wu made a last-minute change in plans and attended the 61st Golden Horse Awards as a co-presenter for the Best Leading Actress category.

== Personal life ==
Wu was in a relationship with his White Ant co-star Aviis Zhong from 2015 to 2017, until he started an on-and-off relationship with The Perfect Match co-star Ivy Shao in 2017. On November 11, 2020, after being spotted living together, Shao publicly confirmed their relationship.

== Filmography ==
=== Television ===
Year	English title	Original title	Role	Notes
2007	Talking With You Boyfriend's Ex-Girlfriend	與男友的前女友密談		Film
2007	Fragile in Love: Poetry in Motion	沿海岸線徵友	Hsiao-hai	Film
2008	Taipei 24H: Save the Lover	台北異想：舊．情人	Rookie	
2009	Autumn's Concerto	下一站，幸福	Hua Tuoye	
2010	Zhong Wu Yen	鍾無艷	Howard	
2010	Days We Stared at the Sun	他們在畢業的前一天爆炸	Police officer	
2011	The Local Hero	田庄英雄	Ma Shanghong	
2012	I Love You So Much	粉愛粉愛你	Bu Haowen	Cameo
2012	Inborn Pair	真愛找麻煩	Zhao Dongyang	
2012	What Is Love	花是愛	Bai Zongyou	
2012	Emerging Light	愛在旭日升起時	Zhang Tingxu	
2013	King Flower	金大花的華麗冒險	Ouyang Tai	
2013	The Sea Reflects the Blue Sky	碧海映藍天	Chien Chunyi	
2013	The Day Mom Came to Visit	那天媽媽來看我	Ho Xuan	Film
2014	Rock N' Road	A咖的路	Zhou Shuyu	
2014	My Antenna Is Broken	搆不到的訊號	Antenna man	Film
2014	Winnie The Boob	小胸維妮的幸福旅程	David	Film
2014	The Lying Game	謊言遊戲	Wei Youliang	
2014	Mr. Right Wanted	徵婚啟事	Xu Lei	Cameo
2014	Love by the River	河畔卿卿	Passerby	Cameo
2015	Heart Of Steel	鋼鐵之心	Dance instructor	Cameo
2015	Wake Up	麻醉風暴	Yeh Chien-te	
2015	Long Day's Journey into Light	出境事務所	Zhao Shengwei	
2015	The Crossing Hero	超級大英雄	Sun Yen-chun	
2015	A Touch of Green	一把青	Kao Jen	
2016	Q Series: Love of Sandstorm	植劇場-戀愛沙塵暴	Lin Yi-de	
2016	In Love - Love	滾石愛情故事-愛情	Chang Ching-yeh	
2016	Where the River Flows	鮮肉老爸	Chiu Min-hui	Film
2016	Lost? Me Too	迷徒Chloe	Wang Shih-chi	Web series
2016	Code	CODE浮士德遊戲	Alex Chen	Web series
2017	The Perfect Match	極品絕配	Huo Ting-en	
2017	The Masked Lover	我的愛情不平凡	Huo Ting-en	Cameo
2017	My Gifts	我的禮物	Chao Yi-chung	Film
2017	We Are One	望月	Chou Ta-lung	Film
2017	Ping Pong	乒乓	Fang Yi	Film
2017	Wake Up 2	麻醉風暴2	Yeh Chien-te	
2018	Your Children Are Not Your Children	你的孩子不是你的孩子		
2019	The World Between Us	我們與惡的距離	Wang She	
2020	The Ghost Bride	彼岸之嫁	Er Lang	Web series
2021	Light the Night	華燈初上	Liu Pao-lung	
2021	Brave Animated Series	勇者動畫系列	Chief Brave	Animated series
2022	Mom, Don't Do That!	媽，別鬧了！	Chen Ru-rong	
2022	Shards of Her	她和她的她	Tu Chun-ju	
2023	Copycat Killer	模仿犯	Guo Xiao-qi	Netflix series
2023	Living	有生之年	Gao Jia-yue	
TBA	Friend Begin	吳慷仁	Chi Hei-ye	

=== Film ===
Year	English title	Original title	Role	Notes/Ref.
2008	Miao Miao	渺渺	Bei Jiaxin	
2008	In the Coming of Surprise	意外之前		Short film
2009	The End Of Love	愛情的盡頭	A-kai	Short film
2010	When Love Comes	當愛來的時候	Mu Zongfu	
2011	Blowfish	河豚		
2012	The Third Wish	第三個願望	Ho Rong-guang	
2012	Dive In	這一刻，愛吧！	Shuai Yiqiang	Short film
2012	Economical Man	經濟適用男	A-han	Short film
2012	Xiao Yuan San Kuai Ke	校園三快客	Wu Shihan	Short film
2012	Love in Kyushu	九州 向愛走	Lin Bai	Short film
2012	Life in Tokyo	東京 不見不散	A-zhi	Short film
2013	Star of Bethlehem	微光閃亮 第一個清晨	A Sheng	
2014	42 Minutes	42分鐘	Husband	Short film
2015	The Bride	屍憶	Yeh Cheng-hao	
2016	White Ant	白蟻─慾望謎網	Bai Yide	
2016	Beyond All Doubt	我們都不應該討論愛情	Ming-lung	Short film
2017	Portrait Coffee Shop	寫真咖啡館	Lin Wen-lung	Short film
2017	Solo	獨奏		Short film
2017	Father with Dark Circles	我的黑眼圈爸爸		Short film
2018	High Flash	引爆點		
2018	The Scoundrels	刁民		
2018	Xiao Mei			
2019	The Lady Improper			
2023	Abang Adik	富都青年	Abang	
2024	Fly Me to the Moon	但願人長久	Lam Kok Man	
2025	Before the Bright Day	南方時光	Hsueh Yung-ming	
2026	Cold War 1994	寒戰1994	Poon Chi-ngong	

=== Music video appearances ===
Year	Song title	Artist
2007	"Breathless" (缺氧)	Rainie Yang
2008	"Too Bad" (殘念)	Jeff Chang
2008	"Unable To Guess" (猜不透)	Della Ding
2012	"It Can Hurt More" (再痛也沒關係)	Andrew Tan
2014	"The Real Me" (真的我)	Ella Chen
2015	" A Million Butterflies" (一百萬隻蝴蝶)	We Save Strawberries
2015	"Travel" (放心去旅行)	Wing Lo
2015	"As It Is" (看淡)	Hebe Tien
2015	"Men Over Clouds and Women on Earth" (天上的男人 地上的女人)	Yoga Lin
2015	"You Are Nothing" (什麼東西)	Kris Kuan
2016	"Truth Be Told" (說實話)	Lee Chien-na
2016	"Tough" (頑固)	Mayday
2017	"Beginning of the End" (終於結束的起點)	Mayday

== Discography ==
=== Soundtrack appearances ===
Year	Song title	TV series/Film
2012	"Sleep" (睡吧)	The Third Wish
2014	"In The Spring" (春天裡)	Rock N' Road
2014	"Onion" (洋蔥)	Rock N' Road
2014	"Friends" (朋友)	Rock N' Road
2016	"Wild Fires of Youth" (野性的青春)	Where the River Flows

== Awards and nominations ==
Year	Award	Category	Nominated work	Result	Ref.
2013	18th Asian Television Awards	Best Actor in a Leading Role	Emerging Light	Won	
2015	50th Golden Bell Awards	Best Supporting Actor in a Miniseries or Television Film	Wake Up	Won	
2015	50th Golden Bell Awards	Best Leading Actor in a Television Series	Long Day's Journey into Light	Nominated	
2016	51st Golden Bell Awards	Best Leading Actor in a Television Series	A Touch of Green	Won	
2017	19th Taipei Film Awards	Best Actor	White Ant	Won	
2017	52nd Golden Bell Awards	Best Leading Actor in a Television Series	Love of Sandstorm	Nominated	
2017	52nd Golden Bell Awards	Best Leading Actor in a Miniseries or Television Film	We Are One	Nominated	
2017	22nd Asian Television Awards	Best Actor in a Leading Role	We Are One	Nominated	
2017	12th Asia-Pacific Producers Network Awards	Best Actor		Won	
2019	54th Golden Bell Awards	Best Leading Actor in a Television Series	The World Between Us	Nominated	
2019	2nd Asian Academy Creative Awards	Best Actor in a Leading Role – Taiwan	The World Between Us	Won	
2021	23rd Taipei Film Awards	Best Actor	I Missed You	Nominated	
2022	57th Golden Bell Awards	Best Supporting Actor in a Television Series	Seqalu: Formosa 1867	Nominated	
2022	5th Asian Academy Creative Awards	Best Actor in a Supporting Role	Light the Night	Won	
2023	17th FIRST International Film Festival	Best Performance	Abang Adik	Won	
2023	58th Golden Bell Awards	Best Leading Actor in a Television Series	Copycat Killer	Nominated	
2023	60th Golden Horse Awards	Best Leading Actor	Abang Adik	Won	
2023	11th QCinema International Film Festival	Best Lead Performance	Abang Adik	Won	
2024	17th Asian Film Awards	Best Actor	Abang Adik	Nominated	
2024	30th Hong Kong Film Critics Society Awards	Best Actor	Fly Me to the Moon	Won	
2024	42nd Hong Kong Film Awards	Best Supporting Actor	Fly Me to the Moon	Nominated	
2024	2nd Da Nang Asian Film Festival	Best Lead Actor (Asian in Competition Films)	Fly Me to the Moon	Won	
2024	6th Asia Contents Awards & Global OTT Awards	Best Lead Actor	Living	Nominated	
2024	59th Golden Bell Awards	Best Male Lead in a Television Series	Living	Won	
2025	18th Asian Film Awards	Next Generation Award	—N/a	Honored	
