= Girls of the Wild's =

South Korean manhwa series

- Cover of Girls of the Wild's volume 1 featuring Queen

소녀 더 와일즈 RR: Sonyeo deo wailjeu MR: Sonyŏ tŏ wailjŭ
- Genre: Action
- Author: Hun
- Illustrator: Zhena (Kim Hye-jin)
- Publisher: Bohai
- English publisher: WEBTOON
- Magazine: Naver WEBTOON
- Original run: August 7, 2011 – October 2016
- Collected volumes: 1 (print)

Girls of the Wild's (Korean: 소녀 더 와일즈) is a South Korean manhwa webtoon series written by Hun and illustrated by Zhena (Kim Hye-jin). It was first published on Naver Webtoon on August 7, 2011, and has been released in English by Line. The story follows a high school guy who enrolls as the sole male student at a former all-girls school of champion fighters, and struggles with dealing with his athletic schoolmates, as well as bullies and gangsters, while training in mixed martial arts. The print release of the first volume of Girls of the Wild's was released on November 9, 2012. 260 chapters of Girls of the Wild's have been released online, with the final chapter posted in October 2016. A Chinese TV adaptation, titled Sweet Combat was released in 2018.

== Plot ==
Jaegu Song, a teenager struggling to take care of his two kindergarten-aged siblings, enrolls on scholarship to Wild's High, an all-girls private school that has become co-ed for the purposes of having their female students, who are renowned for being champions in martial arts, behave like maidens in society. As the sole male student, Jaegu is uncomfortable with the excessive attention from the girls, who get extra credits for befriending Jaegu. To make things worse, he has a run-in with the aloof Queen, who is the Wild's League tournament champion. He is befriended by Moonyoung Lee, Queen's best friend and the boxing club captain, and Daldal Choi, a cute and petite Taekwondo club captain. Although he refuses to follow any of Queen's demeaning tasks, he apologizes for his behavior, and Queen begins to develop romantic feelings for him.

Queen selects Jaegu to be her opponent in the upcoming tournament, but a conflict between Jaegu and Queen's rival, Hyeshin Kim, from Gura High, results in Jaegu being placed in the preliminary rounds. When Jaegu is bullied by a former middle school classmate, Hangyeol Kim, the girls help train Jaegu to fight and their schools arrange for them to face each other. Jaegu overcomes his fears and knocks out Hangyeol. Since then on, Moonyoung, Daldal, Queen, and Jaegu become good friends. Hopae Kim, a successor in a mafia family who easily wins his preliminary matches, gets into a conflict with Queen which escalates to another sanctioned fight that also involves Jaegu and Moonyoung. With Queen away on family business, Daldal and Moonyoung recruit Jaegu to coach them for the second part of the tournament. Moonyoung and Daldal end up fighting each other in the round of 16. Although Queen returns for her match, she withdraws from the tournament to continue her work.

A middle-school boy, Gangrok Choi, joins the group after being rescued by Jaegu from bullying. Hoping to find an edge to use against their Wild's High rivals, Jaeoh joins Jaegu's car wash job while Hopae observes Jaegu more. With Moonyoung to face Hyeshin in the tournament finals, Jaegu meets Hyeshin's older brother, Hyesong, who is a shut-in and, with Hopae's help, gets Hyesong to overcome his fear of bullies and move on with his life.

Queen goes on an arranged date with Higyeong Lee, a young businessman who seems perfect in every way, meanwhile, Daldal meets Myunghwan, a handsome older brother of a soccer-playing boy she gets to know. Higyeong gets jealous of Queen's friendship with Jaegu and at a social event Queen discovers she has been photographed in the bathroom. In order to retrieve the pictures, she and Moonyoung visit a warehouse garage where they, along with Jaegu, Hyesong and Jakdu, agree to fight in matches against the owner Jonathan's top fighters. As Wild's High students wrap up final exams, Daldal confronts Queen because both of them have romantic feelings for Jaegu. Feeling sad about the rivalry with Queen, Daldal is comforted by Myunghwan which raises the ire of a girl who likes Myunghwan. Higyeong and Jonathan send fighters to get revenge on Queen and Moonyoung but fail once more. After Queen's grandfather cancels the dating arrangement with Higyeong, he meets Jaegu to question his motives with Queen.

During the summer, the group, along with Jaegu's siblings, Gangrok, Inseong, Jungu, Hyesong, and Jakdu, go on a trip to one of Queen's resorts. Queen finally tells Jaegu that she likes him and Jaegu reciprocates. However, after returning home, he turns down both Daldal and Queen. After returning home from the trip, Queen goes to Europe and Daldal starts avoiding Jaegu, but is abducted by a group of her fans; she is rescued by her parents, along with Jaegu, Myunghwan, and Hyesong. After this incident, Jaegu's and Daldal's friendship gets better but, at the same time, Daldal gets closer to Myunghwan. As part of a volunteering project at Wild's High, Moonyoung, Daldal, Jaegu, and Jungu join the city's "Walk Home Safe" where Jaegu attempts to protect a middle school girl from her bullies; the bullies bring in a larger gang to confront him but they fail to do so. On Christmas evening, the group, along with Jaegu's siblings, Gangrok, Inseong, and Jungu, celebrate together, and Jaegu realizes his feelings for Queen who is still abroad.

As students enter their next year of school, Jaegu takes over the boxing club as captain, Queen is studying in Japan, Daldal and Myunghwan start dating, whereas Moonyoung and Jungu continue to pursue their unrequited crushes. In the last chapter, Jaegu gathers his courage to go to Japan and reunites with Queen, telling her he promises to be with her always.

== Characters ==
Jaegu Song (송재구)

The series' protagonist, the first male student in Wild's High after it became a co-ed institution.^{Ch. 2} After his father died, his mother abandons him and his two twin siblings, Jaesom and Jaehyeong (at first, they are in kindergarten but Jaegu later sends them to a primary school for gifted pupils^{Ch. 250}). This leads to his aversion to women.^{Ch. 3} After school, he works at a car wash.^{Ch. 4} He originally chose Wild's because it was close to home and he was given a scholarship.^{Ch. 10} After being forced to become stronger to help his family, and to survive inside and outside school, he picks up boxing and trains for the Wild's League preliminaries under the care of Queen, Moonyoung and Daldal,^{Ch. 27} and is able to defeat a bully who had harassed him since middle school (later, he still trains himself and even becomes the captain of the boxing club^{Ch. 252}). He also coaches Moonyoung and Daldal during the Wild's League Tournament.^{Ch. 59, 72} Despite the attention Queen and Daldal give him, Jaegu is oblivious to their affections. He initially accepts Queen's confession,^{Ch. 214} but after interacting with Daldal, he turns both girls down.^{Ch. 220–221} In the final chapter, he reunites with Queen in Japan and promises to be with her always.^{Ch. 260}

Ingui "Queen" Yoon (윤인귀)

Known primarily as Queen, Ingui is the heroine in the series, a second-year student and the Wild's League Tournament champion. She has long blonde hair and almost always has a cool and serious attitude.^{Ch. 1, 12} She is a mixed martial artist, proficient in nearly every form of martial arts, where she helps spar with each of the school clubs.^{Ch. 3, 8} She is the daughter of the financial corporation YK Line, where she was raised to be its successor until her younger brother was born.^{Ch. 4} Despite their initial bad impressions, she develops feelings for Jaegu, who does not fawn over her like everyone else.^{Ch. 5, 11, 22} In later chapters, she musters her courage to tell Jaegu that she likes him as more than just a friend.^{Ch. 214} After being rejected, she stays abroad for a few months to clear her head but is eventually reunited with Jaegu.

Moonyoung Lee (이문영)

Moonyoung is a second-year student and Queen's best friend. The president of Wild's High's boxing club, she has pink hair usually tied up in a bun and wears a red tracksuit. She has a friendly rivalry with Daldal Choi, who makes fun of her weight or calls her a pig.^{Ch. 3, 5} She tries to get along with Jaegu in order to improve her maidenly status.^{Ch. 6, 11} She later coaches Jaegu on fighting. Her father Mungwang Lee owns a boxing club, and is a former welterweight boxing champion in Asia;^{Ch. 24, 97} her estranged mother was also a boxer. She later turns her affections towards Gangrok Choi.^{Ch. 96-103}

Daldal Choi (최달달)

Daldal is a second-year student and the captain of the Taekwondo club.^{Ch. 2, 5} She is described as "cute, adorable and sweet" with a petite figure and "cherry lips" that many boys want to kiss. She has short blonde hair and wears tiger ears-shaped hair-clips as the author was into tigers when he came up with the character.^{Ch. 3} She has a friendly rivalry with Moonyoung who makes fun of her petite stature. She falls in love with Jaegu after initially seeing him as a chance to advance her feminine reputation, and because he was the first boy to refuse her kiss.^{Ch. 3, 6} Over the course of the series, she constantly flirts and shows affection towards Jaegu, who does not reciprocate. She has good cooking skills, most probably inherited by her mother, Jeongran Park, who is a celebrity chef in Korean cuisine and regularly appears on television; Daldal sometimes appears in her mother's TV cooking shows.^{Ch. 24, 72} In later chapters, she develops feelings towards Myunghwan, but denies these feelings (in the last chapters, they start dating).

=== Supporting characters ===
- Hyeshin Kim (김혜신) – A red-haired Gura High student who is Queen's rival. She was the kickboxing champion for two years and was undefeated for ten years before losing to Queen in the match that serves as the prologue to the series.^{Ch. 1, 10}
- Inseong Yoon – Queen's younger brother and successor of the YK family business.^{Ch. 18} He also knows a bit of martial arts and helps Jaegu prepare for the tournament.^{Ch. 39-41} He supports Jaegu and Queen's relationship, working closely with both of their butlers on schemes to bring the two together, such as having their company helicopter fly banners with Queen declaring her love for Jaegu.^{Ch. 41, 73, 90, 93, 176} When Jaegu is about to be evicted, he buys out the apartment (and the car wash that Jaegu works at), charging Jaegu only the cost of utilities.^{Ch. 137-138}
- Jaeoh Hwang – A first-year student from Dong Ah Sang High, he has white hair and a dark complexion. He does not have a specific fighting style. In the tournament, he beats a judo expert but later loses to Minam.^{Ch. 42-47} He is often seen wearing a motorcycle suit. He tries to ally with Hopae on multiple occasions.^{Ch. 71, 86, 114} He then works at the car wash with Jaegu to try to exploit his weaknesses, but he learns Jaegu and his friends are not so bad after all.^{Ch. 102-104, 114, 144}
- Yeojoeung Kim – A Wild's High transfer student from Zhenglun Kwan's school of Chinese martial arts. She originally despises the Wild's League tournament's flashiness and what they deem as martial arts. She has short hair and wears black and red eyeliner, and has a cool composure.^{Ch. 130} In the exhibition match, she uses a spear.^{Ch. 54-58} She prefers to wear a training uniform over the regular school uniform, thus, she is often mistaken for a boy and she attracts a lot of affection from girls who give her love notes.^{Ch. 76-77}
- Jungu Kim – A Wild's High transfer student from the same Chinese martial arts school as Yeojeoung. She has curly hair and rectangular-framed glasses. During the exhibition match, she uses a sword.^{Ch. 54-58} Afterwards, she tries to improve her feminine behavior by learning cooking from Daldal, although she tends to revert to her sword techniques when slicing food. Prior to cooking, she tried sewing and knitting.^{Ch. 75-80, 98} She later gains a crush on Hyesong.^{Ch. 117} She also wins second place at the Wild's League Tournament.^{Ch. 257}
- Hopae Kim – A third-year student from Yushin High, he is a successor of the "Big Tuna" mafia family, although most of the operations are conducted by his older brother.^{Ch. 59} He tries to avenge his mafia group from a prior defeat by Wild's High girls, by easily winning his preliminary round in the tournament, but an incident outside the match results in his diverting his attention to Queen and her friends.^{Ch. 60-72} When Jaegu asks Hopae to help Hyesong confront the latter's bullies, he becomes enamored with Hyeshin and Hyesong's pug,^{Ch. 115, 130} and begins to hang out with their family more often.^{Ch. 133, 212} His gangster power is restricted late on, and must live life as an ordinary high school student at Wild's High.^{Ch. 132} He has an assistant named Jakdu.^{Ch. 62}
- Gangrok Choi – A middle-school boy who was bullied regularly, but when Jaegu rescues him, he wants to be Jaegu's follower and to enroll in Wild's. Although not as physically strong as Jaegu, he trains in boxing with Moonyoung, who falls in love with him.^{Ch. 94-103}
- Hyesong Kim – Hyeshin's older brother.^{Ch. 111} A former kick-boxer who had to deal with being bullied, he had dropped out of high school and shuts himself in for fear of endangering his family.^{Ch. 112, 113} After interacting with Jaegu and Hopae, as well as seeing the lives of the bullies he had to deal with, he is encouraged to move on with his life.^{Ch. 116-119} He finds a job as a courier.^{Ch. 235-237}
- Higyeong Lee – A handsome 25-year-old heir and chairman of the MYG corporation, having worked his way up as a normal guy instead of using his family connections.^{Ch. 134} He is Queen's suitor by arrangement, and hopes that the relationship will boost his family's business. However, he has no personal interest in her, and is rather enamored of the not-so-refined Moonyoung. Although he is superior to Jaegu in all aspects, he gets jealous that Queen pays attention to Jaegu.^{Ch. 136-137, 141-142, 147}
- Myunghwan – A 22-year-old law student who is friendly to Daldal. His younger brother who is closer to Daldal plays soccer.^{Ch. 187} He later admits to having a crush on her,^{Ch. 245} and they start dating.

== Reception ==
In 2014, Girls of the Wild's was selected for its international popularity as one of the Naver webtoons to be published on their foreign language service WEBTOON, from the LINE Corporation. Clinton Stamatovich, a blogger at The Elkhart Truth, listed Girl's of the Wild's among six manhwa titles.

== Works cited ==
- "Ch." is shortened form for chapter and refers to a chapter number of the Girls of the Wild's manhwa
