= Aviis Zhong =

Taiwanese actress

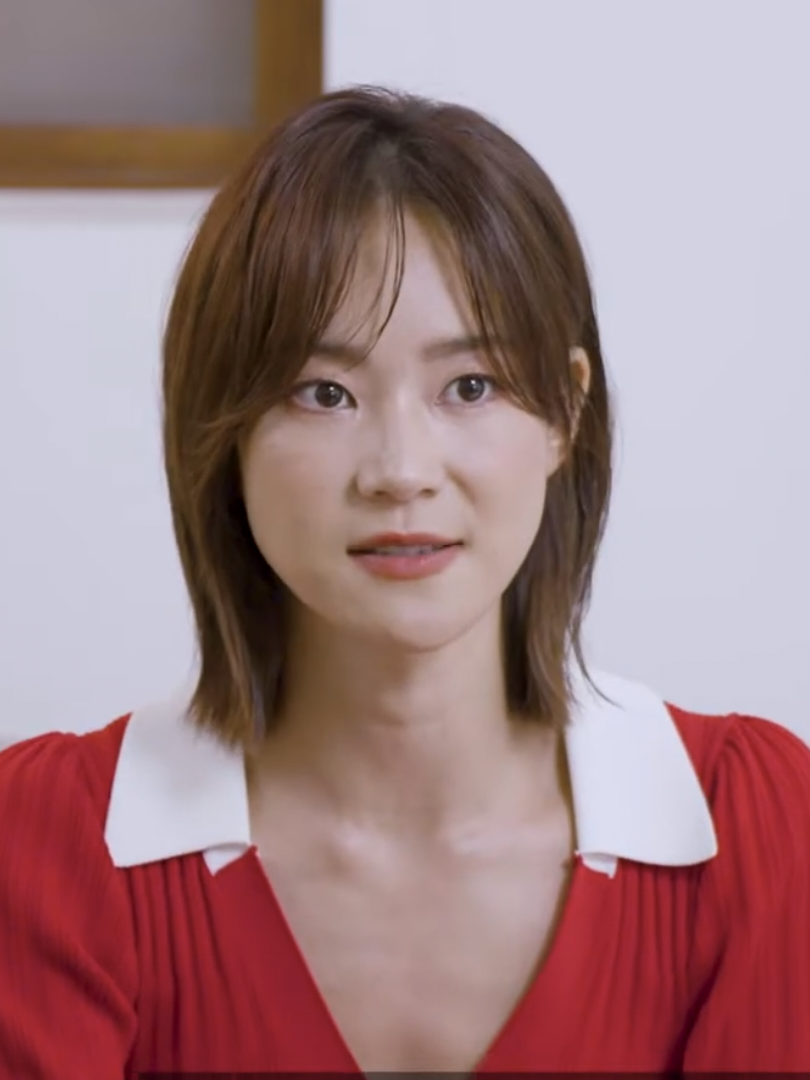
- Zhong in 2023
- Born: 30 July 1986 (age 40); Taiwan
- Education: Shih Chien University
- Occupations: Actress; model
- Years active: 2007–present
- Height: 170 cm (5 ft 7 in)
- Family: Zhong Hui (older sister); Zhong Jia-he (younger sister)

Chinese name
- Traditional Chinese: 鍾瑶
Transcriptions
Standard Mandarin
- Hanyu Pinyin: Zhōng Yáo

Aviis Zhong (Chinese: 鍾瑶; pinyin: Zhōng yáo; born 30 July 1986) is a Taiwanese actress. She is best known for her leading roles in the dramas Iron Ladies and The Wonder Woman.

== Career ==
In 2004, Zhong started out in the industry as a model and appeared in several music videos for artists such as Sandee Chan and S.H.E. In 2007, she received her first acting role in the movie Secret. She then went on to have supporting roles in several dramas such as Gloomy Salad Days, Wake Up 2 and Mr. Right Wanted. Zhong received her first leading role in drama Iron Ladies. She then continued to have leading roles in dramas Five Missions, Code 2 and The Wonder Woman.

Zhong was nominated for Best Actress in a Miniseries or Television Film at the 53rd Golden Bell Awards, for the television film, The Substitute.

== Personal life ==
Zhong graduated from Shih Chien University. A polyglot, she is able to speak four languages: English, Japanese, French and Mandarin Chinese. Zhong is a practising Catholic.

Zhong was in a relationship with White Ant co-star Chris Wu from 2015 to 2017.

== Filmography ==
=== Television ===
Year	Title	Role	Network	Notes
2010	Gloomy Salad Days	Yang Qiao Qiao	PTS	Supporting role
2014	Shaolin Boy Fang Shiyu (少林小子方世玉)	Chu Xiang-yun		Chinese television series
2014	Mr. Right Wanted	Paul's ex-girlfriend	TTV	Cameo
2017	Wake Up 2	Convenience store worker	PTS	Cameo
2017	Reasoning Diaries (推理日記)	7 Spades	LeEco	Chinese television series
2018	Iron Ladies	Zhou Kai-ting	SETTV	Female lead
2018	Five Missions	Alice	EBC	Female lead
2019	Code 2	Du Zi-xin	Star Chinese Movies, FOX+	Female lead
2020	The Wonder Woman	Du Ai-sha	SETTV	Female lead
2023	Wave Makers	Chu Li-ya	Netflix	Supporting role
2024	The Accidental Influencer	Vivian	HBO Go	Supporting role

=== Film ===
Year	Title	Role	Notes
2007	Secret	Hsiao-hua	
2012	Ripples of Desire	Maid	
2016	Back to Soul (回魂)	Bella	Telemovie
2016	Love, Lost and Found	Xu Jing-yi	Telemovie
2017	The Substitute	Ni Ke	Telemovie
2017	White Ant	Tang Jun-hong	
2017	Aground	Qin	
2017	Mermaid Whispering	Mermaid	
2017	Never-Ending Road	Fan Zi-xi	
2018	Floating Port (漂港)		
2018	Wei Wei the Angel	Li Wei-wei	Telemovie
2018	Territory of Love	Professor Chen	
2018	Let's Cheat Together	Liu Yi-sen	
2020	Freak (怪胎)	Mei Yu	
2020	Blood of the Blue (東經北緯)		
2020	High Time A.K.A Dead & Beautiful (狂歡時刻High Time)	Lulu	
2022	The Post-Truth World	Hsu Ya-ching	

=== Miniseries ===
Year	Title	Role	Network
2012	Sun-sien-kuk Su-khien	Liu Pei-xuan	Hakka TV
2016	Rock Records in Love	Lina	PTS

=== Microfilm ===
Year	Title	Role	Notes
2009	Summer Poetry (夏日之詩)	Fen Fei	
2012	Heartbreak Recipe (心碎祕方)	Ms Gao	
2012	The Snail School (慢吞吞小學)	Teacher Huang	
2012	The Gift (門縫前的包裹)	Mi Wei-an	
2013	Shadow (影子)	Blonde girl	
2013	A Stray (動物之心)		for Golden Horse Film Festival
2014	Reading Taiwan Literature: The Moth (閱讀時光-蛾)	Mi Suo	
2015	Yilan Happiness 150 宜蘭幸福150	Yang Yong-lu	
2015	Lunch Break (午休時間)	Wu Yong-xuan	
2016	Design for Love (【遇見設計，邂逅愛│Design for love】把你的靈魂接在我的線路上篇)	Lin En	

=== Variety show ===
Year	Title	Network	Notes
2008	Fashion Hashtag (時尚#hashtag)	Azio TV	Host

=== Music video appearances ===
Year	Song title	Artist
2004	"Inspection 驗傷"	Sandee Chan
2004	"Your Reason 妳的理由"	MrYang
2004	"The Road to Happiness 幸福的路"	Rene Liu
2005	"Grey Sky 天灰"	S.H.E
2005	"The Next Second 下一秒鐘"	Fish Leong
2005	"Some Year, Some Month 某年某月"	Linda Lee
2005	"Unspeakable Farewell 说不出的告别"	Terry Lin
2005	"Crocodile's Tears 鱷魚的眼淚"	Terry Lin
2016	"I Want Happiness 我要快樂"	A-Mei
2016	"Love Song for Myself 給自己的情歌"	Gigi Leung
2016	"Waiting 等待"	Andy Chen
2007	"Intersection 路口"	A-Yue
2007	"I Knew It, Love 早知道．愛"	Afalean Lu
2007	"I Don't Want To Fight 愛我的兩個人"	Afalean Lu
2009	"Love You More and More 愛妳越來越多"	Wu Bai
2009	"Blockhead 木頭人"	A Mu Long
2010	"Single Mirror 單面鏡"	Bibi Zhou
2011	"Can't Afford to be Hurt 傷不起"	Yisa Yu
2011	"Why Did You Cry 怎麼會哭"	Nicholas Teo
2013	"Say Goodbye 好好說再見"	David Tao, Sharon Kwan
2014	"Living With You 跟你住"	Shi Shi
2014	"Full of Love 全是愛"	VChuan
2014	"The Life I Left Behind 我留下的一個生活"	Valen Hsu
2016	"Stubborn Love 不將就"	Li Ronghao
2016	"Not Over You 死心了沒有"	Ricky Hsiao
2016	"What is the Shape of Your Love 你的愛是什麼形狀"	GJ
2019	"Can't Breathe 窒息"	EggPlantEgg

== Theater ==
Year	Artist	Song	Album	Lyrics	Music
2018	Shi Shi	"Self-Healing" (自我癒合)	"Woman" (女·人 Woman)	Yes	No

== Awards and nominations ==
Year	Award	Category	Nominated work	Result
2018	53rd Golden Bell Awards	Best Actress in a Miniseries or Television Film	The Substitute	Nominated
