= The Perfect Match (TV series) =

2017 Taiwanese romantic-comedy TV series

- Promotional poster
- 極品絕配
- Genre: Romance; Comedy
- Created by: Sanlih E-Television
- Written by: Wang You Zhen 王宥蓁; Zhang Qing Hui 張清慧 (Ep. 4-6, Ep. 15-22); Xuan Huang 玄黃 (Ep. 6-11, Ep. 15-22); Zhan Yun Ru 詹韵如 (Ep. 11-22)
- Directed by: Luo An De 羅安得
- Starring: Wu Kang-jen; Ivy Shao; Ben Wu; Xiao Man; Nylon Chen
- Opening theme: "Pray for Love 為愛而愛" by GBOYSWAG
- Ending theme: "Playhouse 家家酒" by Jia Jia
- Country of origin: Taiwan
- Original language: Mandarin
- No. of episodes: 22+1

Production
- Executive producer: Hong Ren Zhong 洪任中
- Producer: Sun Zheng Quan 孫證荃
- Production location: Taiwan
- Running time: 75 minutes
- Production companies: Tung Hsin Entertainment Co., Ltd; Sanlih E-Television

Original release
- Network: SET Metro
- Release: 3 March – 4 August 2017

The Perfect Match (Chinese: 極品絕配; pinyin: jí pǐn júe pèi; literally Need for a Perfect Match) is a 2017 Taiwanese romantic comedy series. It was first broadcast on 3 March 2017.

== Plot ==
Huo Ting En is a renowned chef who trained at Le Cordon Bleu in Paris. He specializes in Curry dishes from Japan, Thailand, Malaysia, Sri Lanka, and India at his restaurant, La Mure. He crosses paths with Night Market chef Wei Fen Qing after netizens claim that her dishes are a cheaper version of his. Love eventually blooms between the two, but their union is hindered by a past secret.

== Cast ==
=== Main cast ===
- Wu Kang-jen as Huo Ting En is a celebrated chef, general manager of Yanis corporation's and head chef at a high end restaurant La Mure. He feels guilty over his sister's death. Wei Fen Qing reminds him of his sister and he decides to teach her how to make curry. He falls for her but decides to stay away due to a past tragedy.
- Ivy Shao as Wei Fen Qing is a strong and loving girl who owns a cooking stall at the night market, named as Civilian version of Huo Ting En by the netizens on the internet. She aspires to revive the name of her father, the Curry King. She accepts the challenge of Ting En to recreate his taste but loses and ends up as his apprentice. She eventually falls for him.
- Ben Wu as Meng Shao Wei is the wealthy heir who leaves home for love but finds a new life working in the night market and befriending Wei Fen Qing. He has feelings for Wei Fen Qing but she only sees him as a friend.
- Xiao Man as Meng Ru Xi is a food critic, sister of Meng Shao Wei, who falls for Huo Ting En and helps him on many occasions but he doesn't reciprocate her feelings. She eventually gets together with Huo Tian Zhi.
- Nylon Chen as Huo Tian Zhi is the second son of Huo family, assistant general manager of Yanis corporation and step brother of Huo Ting En. He loves his brother and makes efforts to unite Meng Ru Xi and Huo Ting En only to fall for Ru Xi after having a one night stand with her.

=== Supporting cast ===
- Liu Shu Hong as Peng Xiao Bin
- Hsieh Li-chin as Yu Jie
- Stanley Mei as Chen Jin Wang
- Gao Wei Teng as Uncle Spareribs
- An Ji as Zhen Zhen
- Kiki as Nai Nai
- Hu Pei-Lien as Qiu Shu Feng
- Zhang Cheng Wei as Wei Cheng Yang
- Jackson Lou as Meng Xing Da
- Kelly Mi as Xiao Hai Wei
- Su Yi Jing as Gong Mei Li
- Li Xing as Yang Yu Qing
- Shen Hai Rong as Wen Xiu Zhi
- Rim as Brian
- Zhang Ji Quan as Jack

=== Cameo ===
- Weber Yang as Ku Le-chun
- Mini Tsai as Wu Ping-fan
- Lung Shao-hua as Jung Fu-hsiung

== Soundtrack ==
- "Pray for Love 為愛而愛" by GBOYSWAG
- "Playhouse 家家酒" by Jia Jia
- "See Through 看透" by Jia Jia
- "Hey" by Jia Jia
- "Make It Real" by GBOYSWAG
- "I'm Super Ready" by GBOYSWAG
- "Loved Someone 很愛過一個人" by Della Wu
- "Life of Planet 少年他的奇幻漂流" by Mayday

== Broadcast ==
| Network | Country | Airing Date | Timeslot |
|---|---|---|---|
| SET Metro | Taiwan | 3 March 2017 | Friday 10:00 - 11:30 pm |
| EBC Variety | Taiwan | 4 March 2017 | Saturday 10:00 - 11:30 pm |
| iQiyi | Taiwan | 3 March 2017 | Friday 24:00 |
| CTS | Taiwan | 6 July 2017 | Monday to Friday 9:00 - 10:00 pm |
| Astro Shuang Xing | Malaysia | 3 March 2017 | Friday 10:00 - 11:30 pm |
| E City | Singapore | 9 April 2017 | Sunday 9:30-11:00 pm |
| Dorama | Russia | 19 October 2017 | Monday to Friday 19.05 pm |
| Echannel | Vietnam | 11 August 2019 | Two episodes, Daily 6-8pm |
| GMA News TV | Philippines | 2021 | TBA |
| Mediacorp Channel 8 | Singapore | 2021 | TBA |

== Ratings ==
Competing dramas on rival channels airing at the same time slot were:
- FTV - My Teacher Is Xiao-he
- SET Taiwan - Flavor of Life (re-run), Our Mother (re-run)
- TTV - Q series

| Air Date | Chapter | Average Ratings | Rank |
|---|---|---|---|
| Mar 3, 2017 | 1 | 1.43 | 2 |
| Mar 10, 2017 | 2 | 1.50 | 2 |
| Mar 17, 2017 | 3 | 1.75 | 1 |
| Mar 24, 2017 | 4 | 1.59 | 1 |
| Mar 31, 2017 | 5 | 1.67 | 1 |
| Apr 7, 2017 | 6 | 1.50 | 1 |
| Apr 14, 2017 | 7 | 1.57 | 1 |
| Apr 21, 2017 | 8 | 1.57 | 1 |
| Apr 28, 2017 | 9 | 1.59 | 1 |
| 5 May 2017 | 10 | 1.67 | 1 |
| 12 May 2017 | 11 | 1.84 | 1 |
| 19 May 2017 | 12 | 1.67 | 1 |
| 26 May 2017 | 13 | 1.64 | 1 |
| Jun 2, 2017 | 14 | 1.50 | 1 |
| Jun 9, 2017 | 15 | 1.64 | 2 |
| Jun 16, 2017 | 16 | 1.69 | 2 |
| Jun 23, 2017 | 17 | 1.45 | 2 |
| Jun 30, 2017 | 18 | 1.74 | 2 |
| Jul 7, 2017 | 19 | 1.41 | 2 |
| Jul 14, 2017 | 20 | 1.46 | 1 |
| Jul 21, 2017 | 21 | 1.66 | 1 |
| Jul 28, 2017 | 22 | 2.13 | 1 |
| Aug 4, 2017 | Special Episode | -- | -- |
| Average ratings | | 1.62^{1} | -- |

^Note 1: The average rating calculation does not include special episode.
