= Lego Lee =

Taiwanese actor and singer (born 1986)

- 李國毅
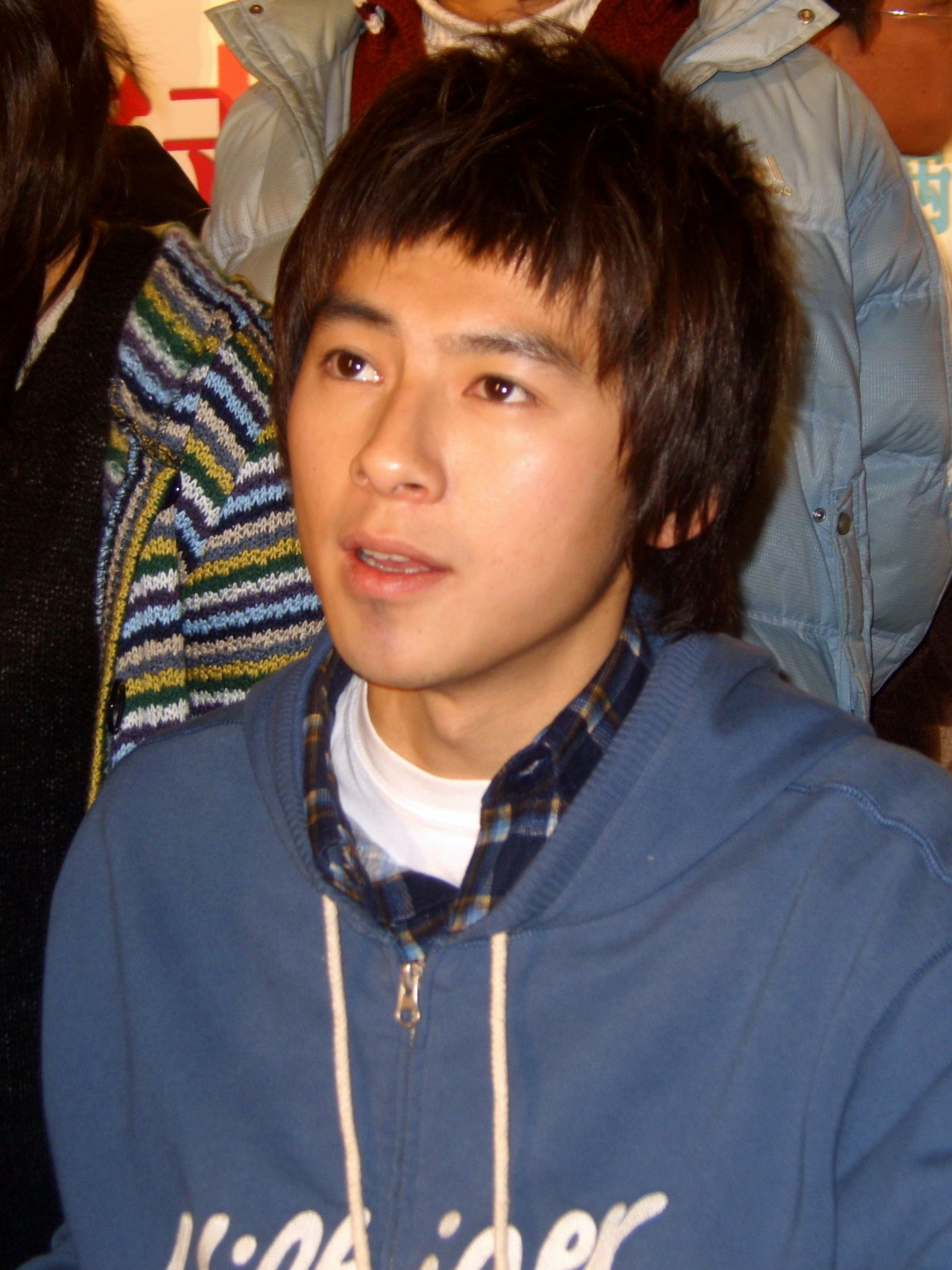
- Lee in 2008
- Born: January 22, 1986 (age 40); New Taipei City, Taiwan
- Education: National Taiwan University of Physical Education and Sport; Dayeh University
- Occupations: Actor, singer
- Years active: 2006-present

Chinese name
- Traditional Chinese: 李國毅
- Simplified Chinese: 李国毅
Transcriptions
Standard Mandarin
- Hanyu Pinyin: Li Guóyì
- Bopomofo: ㄌㄧˇ ㄍㄨㄛˊ ㄧˋ
Southern Min
- Hokkien POJ: Lí Kok-gē
- Musical career
- Also known as: Lego Li; Li Guo-yi; Li Kuo-yi

Lego Lee (Chinese: 李國毅; Pe̍h-ōe-jī: Lí Kok-gē, born January 22, 1986) is a Taiwanese actor and singer who is best-known for his roles in the television series In a Good Way, Aim High, and Love Cuisine. Lee holds a master's degree in sport management from Dayeh University, and holds coaching and umpiring qualifications in swimming. He was also a basketball player and was a Taipei-wide high school high jump champion.

== Filmography ==
=== Television series ===
Year	Title	Role	Network	Notes
2006	Extreme Ironing	Hsiao-hu	PTS	
2006	Soul Poem	Ming-chih	PTS	
2008	Honey and Clover	An Chu-pun	CTS; GTV Variety Show	
2009	Game Winning Hit	Lin Chi-ming	TTV Main Channel	alternative title: Play Ball
2009	Lotus Rain	Qiao Ziliang	CCTV-1	
2010	Because of You	Fang Tzu-hao	CTS; TVBS Entertainment Channel	
2011	Soldier	Lin Chih-hung	TTV; SET Metro	
2012	Home (回家/彼岸1945)	Su Tai-chieh	TTV; PTS	
2013	In a Good Way	Liu Shan-feng	SET Metro; EBC	
2014	Aim High	Rzen Tao-yuan	SET Metro; EBC	
2015	Love Cuisine	Chef Oscar Han	SET Metro; EBC	
2016	Special Partner (非常搭檔)	He Mu	BTV	
2016	Love @ Seventeen	Ho Hao-yi	TTV; EBC	alternative title: Love at Seventeen
2016	In Love: I Truly Give My Love to You	Lu Ming-chin	PTS	Mini Chapter Story
2016–2017	The King of Romance	Wang Chen/Wang Nuo	TTV; EBC	
2017	Wake Up 2	Dr. Hsiung Sen/Xiong Zai	PTS	Also performed as a rapper
2018	Meet Me @ 1006	Lawyer Ke Chen Yu	TTV; EBC	
2019	Brave to Love			
2019	The Fearless			
2024	Trade War	Huang Hung-tah	FTV; SET Taiwan	
2025	Brave Animated Series	Chief Brave	PTS	Replaced Wu Kang Ren in Season 2

=== Film ===
Year	Title	Role	Notes
2006	The Road in the Air	Yang Chih-kuo	
2006	Gold Code	Li Kuo	Short film
2007	Never Give Up	Hsiao-chih	Short film
2008	My So-Called Love	A-chieh	
2008	South Night	Wei	
2013	27°C – Loaf Rock	Wu Pao-chun	
2015	All You Need Is Love	Wu Si-fu	
TBA	Yao Cao Shi	藥草師	Teng Cha-chiu

=== Music video appearances ===
Year	Artist	Song title
2005	S.H.E	"Grey Sky"
2007	S.H.E	"Say You Love Me"
2007	F.I.R.	"Three Wishes"
2009	By2	"I Know"
2014	Claire Kuo	"Part-Time Lover"

== Bibliography ==
- Lee, Lego (2012). 我和爺爺的青春約會 (in Chinese). Taipei: Business Weekly Publications. ISBN 9789862721070.

== Discography ==
=== Extended plays ===
Title	Album details	Track listing
Lego Lee's Independent Travel (EP + Photo Album) 李國毅的自由旅行 EP+寫真	Released: September 10, 2014; Label: Shui Ling Wen Chuang; Formats: CD, digital download	Track listing: 1. "In A Good Way"; 2. "Be Happy With You" (陪你幸福); 3. "Water Bottle" (水瓶)

=== Soundtrack albums ===
Title	Album details	Track listing
Honey and Clover Original Soundtrack 蜂蜜幸運草 (電視原聲帶)	Released: May 16, 2008; Label: Avex Taiwan; Formats: CD, digital download	Track listing: 1. "Blessing of the Lucky Clover" (幸運草的祝福); 2. "Be My King"
Because of You Original Soundtrack 星光下的童話-電視原聲帶	Released: April 20, 2010; Label: Warner Music Taiwan; Formats: CD, digital download	Track listing: 1. "Love is the Key" (愛是關鍵); 2. "Because of You" (因為妳); 3. "Outside the Old Town" (老城外); 4. "The Day You Left Me" (離開我的那一天); 5. "Starlight of the Last Year" (去年的星光; with Chie Tanaka)
Home OST 回家 (電視劇原聲帶)	Released: February 8, 2013; Label: Linfair Records; Formats: CD, digital download	"Only the Moon is Visible" (只有月亮全看見)
27°C-Loaf Rocks (Original Motion Picture Soundtrack) 世界第一麥方 (電影原聲帶)	Released: July 8, 2013; Label: CMC Music; Formats: Digital download	"Keep Walking Down the Same Road" (一條路一直走)
All You Need Is Love Original Soundtrack 落跑吧 愛情 (電影原聲帶)	Released: August 8, 2015; Label: B'in Music; Formats: Digital download	"Return to the Beginning" (回到最初)
The King of Romance Soundtrack <如朕親臨> 插曲	Released: December 2016; Label: Forward Music; Formats: Digital download	"The One" (唯一)

== Awards and nominations ==
Year	Award	Category	Nominated work	Result
2006	Asian Festival of First Films	Best Actor	The Road in the Air	Won
2014	Sanlih Drama Awards	Best Actor	In a Good Way	Nominated
2014	Sanlih Drama Awards	Best Actor	Aim High	Nominated
2014	Sanlih Drama Awards	Best Screen Couple (with Lorene Ren)	In a Good Way	Won
2014	Sanlih Drama Awards	Best Kiss (with Lorene Ren)	In a Good Way	Nominated
2014	Sanlih Drama Awards	Most Tear-Jerking Performance (with Lorene Ren)	In a Good Way	Nominated
2014	Sanlih Drama Awards	Best Screen Couple (with Kuo Shu-yao)	Aim High	Nominated
2014	Sanlih Drama Awards	Chinese Wave Award	Aim High	Nominated
2014	Sanlih Drama Awards	Weibo Popularity Award	Aim High	Nominated
2015	Sanlih Drama Awards	Best Actor	Love Cuisine	Won
2015	Sanlih Drama Awards	Best Screen Couple (with Allison Lin)	Love Cuisine	Nominated
2015	Sanlih Drama Awards	Best Selling S-Pop Magazine Award	—N/a	Won
2018	53rd Golden Bell Awards	Best Leading Actor in a Television Series	Wake Up 2	Nominated
