= Love by Design =

2016 Taiwanese television series

- Promotional poster
- 必勝練習生
- Genre: Romance; Comedy
- Created by: Eastern Television
- Written by: Zou Wei Gang (ep 1-9); Yu Yuan Yuan (Ep 10-11); Lai Shu Ya (Ep 10-16); Zhu Jian Qing (Ep 10-16); Zheng Ya Lan (Ep 12-16)
- Directed by: Ker Choon Hooi; Zhu Jian Qing; Jiang Rui Zhi
- Starring: Alan Ko; Allison Lin; Ahn Zhe; Beatrice Fang
- Opening theme: "Says You 你說妳說" by Angel Ho 何以奇
- Ending theme: "Yearn 念想" by Fong Wonder
- Country of origin: Taiwan
- Original language: Mandarin
- No. of episodes: 16+1

Production
- Producer: Ma Jin Da
- Production location: Taiwan
- Running time: 90 minutes (Ep 1-15); 120 minutes (Ep 16)

Original release
- Network: TTV; EBC Variety
- Release: 30 July – 19 November 2016

Related
- Love @ Seventeen; The King of Romance

Love by Design (Chinese: 必勝練習生; pinyin: bì shèng liàn xí shēng; literally "Win Trainee") is a 2016 Taiwanese romantic comedy television series created and produced by Eastern Television. It stars Alan Ko, Allison Lin, Ahn Zhe and Beatrice Fang as the main cast. Filming began on May 12, 2016, and wrapped up on August 24, 2016. First original broadcast began on July 30, 2016, on TTV airing every Saturday night at 10:00-11:30 pm.

It is a remake of the South Korean drama Baby Faced Beauty, which first aired in 2011.

== Synopsis ==
What would you if you were 34 years old and laid off from your job? Li Shu Fen gets fired from her job despite giving it many years of loyal service. Unable to find another job, Shu Fen uses her baby face to her advantage when she ends up lying about her age and taking an entry-level job as a 25-years-old rookie for a major clothing company. There, she meets the company president, who may catch her in her web of lies. How long can Shu Fen keep up her ruse to try to chase her dream of becoming a fashion designer?

== Cast ==
=== Main cast ===
- Alan Ko as Song Chong Ji
- Allison Lin as Li Shu Fen
- Ahn Zhe as Chi Yu Hao
- Beatrice Fang as Jiang Yi Shu

=== Supporting cast ===
- Chang Chin-lan as Li Shu Zhen
- Jason Hsu as Fu Zhu Ren
- Jade Chang as Jiang Na La
- Claire Lee as Sun Hui Ting
- Tseng Tzu-yu as Guo Min Ji
- Da Fei as Gao Ren Jie
- Chang Chien as Xu Li Ping
- Liu Si Di as Yu Mei Shun
- Yang Li-yin as Chen Ting Yu
- Ding Ning as Bai Cai Yun
- Emily Hung as Chi Yuan Yuan
- Angel Ho as Chi Ruo Yi

=== Cameos ===
- Min Hsiung as Zhao Xuan Nan
- Joseph Ma as Ceng Qian Shi
- Lin Chun-yung as Xu Chun Lei
- Jerry Sha as An Xin Ya
- Zhuang Zhuang as Hao Qiang
- Tu Kai Xiang as personnel manager of The Style
- Amanda Chou as Zhou Xiao Han
- Guan Jin Zong as Manager Huang
- Joseph Hsia as Song Cheng Xian
- Hsieh Chi-wen as Li Yi Wen
- Yvonne Yao as Yao Cai Ying

== Soundtrack ==
- "Says You 你說妳說" by Angel Ho
- "Yearn 念想" by Fong Wonder
- "Last to Realize 後知後覺" by Fong Wonder
- "Beautiful Day" by The Vanquish
- "I'm Sorry, I Need You 對不起我需要你" by Audrey An
- "Have You Ever 你是否" by Audrey An
- "Goodbye Love 告別愛情" by Chen Yi Ting
- "Test of Happiness 幸福的試卷" by You Hui Wen

== Broadcast ==
Network	Country	Airing Date	Timeslot
TTV	Taiwan	July 30, 2016	Saturday 10:00-11:30 pm
EBC Variety	Taiwan	July 31, 2016	Sunday 10:00-11:30 pm
Jia Le Channel	Singapore	January 31, 2017	Monday to Friday 10:50 pm

== Episode ratings ==
Competing shows on rival channels airing at the same time slot were:
- CTS - Genius Go Go Go
- FTV - Just Dance
- CTV - Mr. Player

Air Date	Episode	Average Ratings	Rank
Jul 30, 2016	1	0.52	4
Aug 6, 2016	2	0.63	4
Aug 13, 2016	3	0.61	4
Aug 20, 2016	4	0.69	4
Aug 27, 2016	5	0.71	4
Sep 3, 2016	6	1.04	3
Sep 10, 2016	7	0.75	4
Sep 17, 2016	8	0.85	4
Sep 24, 2016	9	0.90	4
Oct 1, 2016	10	1.17	4
Oct 8, 2016	11	0.89	4
Oct 15, 2016	12	1.22	3
Oct 22, 2016	13	1.07	4
Oct 29, 2016	14	0.86	4
Nov 5, 2016	15	0.78	4
Nov 12, 2016	16	1.23	2
Nov 19, 2016	Special Episode	--	--
Average ratings		0.87^{1}	--

^Note 1: The average rating calculation does not include special episode.

== Awards and nominations ==
Year	Ceremony	Category	Nominee	Result
2017	52nd Golden Bell Awards	Best Leading Actress in a Television Series	Allison Lin	Nominated
