= Huang Yiling =

Huang Yiling is the name of:

- Huang Yee-ling (born 1969), Taiwanese singer
- Huang Yi-ling (born 1985), Taiwanese sport shooter
- Michelle Wong (born 1991), Singaporean actress
