= Kuo Shu-yao =

Taiwanese actress, singer and television host

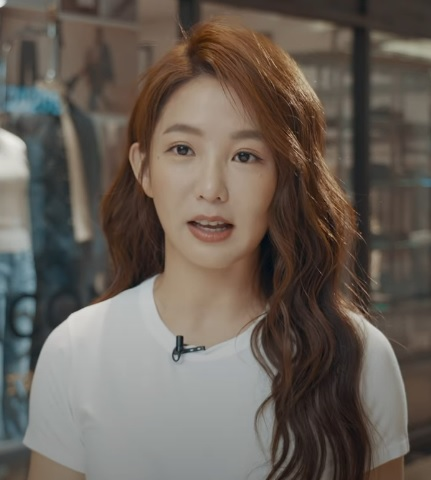
- Kuo in 2022
- Born: 18 July 1990 (age 36); Taipei, Taiwan
- Occupations: Actress; singer; television host; entrepreneur
- Years active: 2007–present

Chinese name
- Traditional Chinese: 郭書瑤
- Simplified Chinese: 郭书瑶
- Hanyu Pinyin: Guō Shūyáo
- Musical career
- Labels: Seed Music (2007–2014); Pourquoi Pas Music (2019–present)

Kuo Shu-yao (Chinese: 郭書瑤; born 18 July 1990), nicknamed Yao Yao, is a Taiwanese actress, singer, television host, and entrepreneur. In 2013 she won the Golden Horse Award for Best New Performer for her role in Step Back to Glory.

== Life and career ==
Kuo Shu-yao has a younger brother Kuo Po-ting.

In May 2007, Kuo's father died and she began working part-time at a restaurant to support her family. Two years later, in 2009, she entered show business as a model. After signing with Seed Music in 2007, she debuted as a singer and released a mini album titled Love Hug on 22 August 2007.

In 2017, she played the titular character in the supernatural coming-of-age drama The Teenage Psychic. The 6-episode series is an adaptation of the short film The Busy Young Psychic by writer-director Chen Ho-yu. The Teenage Psychic is also HBO Asia's first Mandarin-language original series. In 2021, Kuo established the fashion brand Myâme.

== Filmography ==
=== Television series ===
| Year | English title | Mandarin title | Role | Network | Notes |
|---|---|---|---|---|---|
| 2010 | Ni Yada | 倪亞達 | Ni Chien-kuo | TTV; SET Metro | |
| 2010 | I, My Brother | 我和我的兄弟·恩 | Social worker | Astro Jia Yu; CTV | |
| 2011 | Story 33 | 33故事館-Yo天使 | Meng Yao | STV | |
| 2011 | Office Girls | 小資女孩向前衝 | Liu Yu-le (Le Le) | TTV; SET Metro | |
| 2012 | Ti Amo Chocolate | 愛上巧克力 | Hung Hsi-hui | SET Metro; EBC | |
| 2012 | King Flower | 金大花的華麗冒險 | A-hsi | SET Metro | Alternative Title: Princess Stand In |
| 2014 | Aim High | 22K夢想高飛 | Yen Mao-tang | SET Metro | |
| 2014 | Mr. Right Wanted | 徵婚啟事 | Tien Hsin | TTV | |
| 2015 | Heart Of Steel | 鋼鐵之心 | Hsiao Hsiao | CTV | |
| 2015 | Ghost Stories 4 | 聊齋新編之夜叉國 | Qiu Rong | Zhejiang Television | Alternative Title: Liao Zhai 4 |
| 2016 | Golden Darling | 原來1家人 | Yen Ju-yu | CTV; Star Chinese Channel | |
| 2016 | In Love – Love Me, Don't Go | 滾石愛情故事-愛我別走 | Chien Ko-hsuan | PTS | |
| 2016 | The Devil Game | 劣人傳之詭計 | Wang Hsiao-ying / Chiu Jo-han | Line TV | Web series |
| 2016 | Cosmetic Raiders | 整容攻略 | Fei Meng | QQ | Web series |
| 2017 | The Teenage Psychic | 通靈少女 | Xie Yazhen (Xiao Zhen) | PTS; HBO Asia | |
| 2017 | Attention, Love! | 稍息立正我愛你 | An Hsiao-chiao | EBC | |
| 2018 | The Wolf | 狼殿下 | Yelü Baona | Tencent Video iQIYI Youku|| | |
| 2019 | The Teenage Psychic 2 | 通靈少女2 | Xie Yazhen (Xiao Zhen) | PTS; HBO Asia | |
| 2021 | Rainless Love in a Godless Land | 無神之地不下雨 | Malusakadat | iQIYI | |
| 2024 | Love on a Shoestring | 完全省錢戀愛手冊 | Chien Ko Ko | TVBS meWATCH | |
| 2024 | The Accidental Influencer | 何百芮的地獄毒白 | Ho Pai-ruei | HBO Go | |

=== Film ===
| Year | English title | Mandarin title | Role | Notes |
|---|---|---|---|---|
| 2012 | When a Wolf Falls in Love with a Sheep | 南方小羊牧場 | Tsui Pao-pao | |
| 2013 | Step Back to Glory | 志氣 | Li Chun-ying | |
| 2013 | Campus Confidential | 愛情無全順 | Chen Mei-hsueh | |
| 2013 | Justin and the Knights of Valour | —N/a | Talia | Taiwanese Version, voice |
| 2014 | The Frogville | 桃蛙源記 | Little Heymon | Voice |
| 2014 | Live at Love | 活路：妒忌私家偵探社 | Shi-na | Alternative Title: Live@Love |
| 2014 | Happiness Amulet | 幸福御守 | Hsiao Hsing | Short film |
| 2014 | Meet Miss Anxiety | 我的早更女友 | Lao Bai | |
| 2015 | Battle Up! | 舞鬥 | Wang Lei-lei | |
| 2015 | Brave Heart | 勇敢的心 | Cheng Yun | Short film |
| 2017 | The Mad King of Taipei | 西城童話 | Hsiao Hu | |
| 2017 | All Because of Love | 痴情男子漢 | Hsu Kan-tien | Cameo appearance |
| 2018 | Secrets of the Hot Spring Hotel | 切小金家的旅馆 | Suzuki | |
| 2019 | Fall in Love at First Kiss | 一吻定情 | Nurse head | Cameo |
| 2019 | A Fool in Love, Love Like a Fool | 傻傻愛你，傻傻愛我 | Hsiao-xian | |
| 2022 | Say Yes Again | 再說一次我願意 | Song Cai-ning | |
| 2024 | The Chosen One | 流氓驱魔师 | Ah Jiao | |

=== Variety and reality shows ===
| Year | English title | Mandarin title | Network | Notes |
|---|---|---|---|---|
| 2008–2009 | Game King | 數位遊戲王 | CTV | Host |
| 2009 | Why | 但是又何奈 | GTV Variety Show | Host |
| 2009 | Gold Taxi | 黃金計程車 | EBC | Guest Host |
| 2010 | Guess | 我猜我猜我猜猜猜 | CTV | Guest Host |
| 2011 | V News | —N/a | Channel V Taiwan | Host |
| 2014 | Star Chef | 星廚駕到 | Jiangsu Television | Season 1, Contestant |
| 2024 | Sister Who Make Waves | 乘风破浪 | Mango TV | Season 5, Contestant |

=== Music video appearances ===
| Year | Artist | Song title |
|---|---|---|
| 2010 | F.Cuz | "Jiggy" |
| 2010 | Kenji Wu | "Love Me Hate Me" |
| 2014 | William Wei | "Mask" |
| 2017 | Nana Lee | "Bù céng huí lái guò" |
| 2021 | B.T.O.D | "Broken Promise of Forever Love" |
| 2022 | TGOP | "Big Iced Milk Tea" |

== Discography ==
=== Studio albums ===
| Title | Album details | Track listing |
|---|---|---|
| Honey | Released: 24 December 2008; Label: Seed Music; Formats: CD, digital download | Track listing: 1. Honey; 2. 愛像圓舞曲; 3. 幸福不遠; 4. 最佳男朋友; 5. Di Di Da; 6. 好姊妹; 7. 愛的元氣; 8. 自己回家; 9. 口袋裡的花; 10. Bird |

=== Live albums ===
| Title | Album details | Track listing |
|---|---|---|
| 末日前的告白音樂會Live全紀錄 | Released: 4 January 2013; Label: Seed Music; Formats: CD, digital download | Track listing: 1. 不是每個戀曲都有美好回憶 (Live); 2. 愛你 (Live); 3. Don't Stop (Live); 4. 我是女生 (Live); 5. 熱帶雨林 (Live); 6. 你的甜蜜 (Live); 7. 戀愛應援團 (Live); 8. 我只在乎你 (Live); 9. 來不及說再見 (Live); 10. 年輕不要留白 (Live); 11. 勇氣 (Live); 12. 幸福不遠 (Live); 13. 流星雨 (Live); 14. 愛就是咖哩 (Live); 15. 不要不要 (Live); 16. 不敗的戀人 (Live); 17. Honey (Live); 18. 愛的告白 (Live); 19. 放棄你 (Live); 20. 自己回家 (Live); 21. 離開你那天 (Live); 22. 愛的抱抱 (Live) |

=== Extended plays (EPs) ===
| Title | Album details | Track listing |
|---|---|---|
| Love Hug 愛的抱抱 | Released: 22 August 2007; Label: Seed Music; Formats: CD, digital download | Track listing: 1. 愛的抱抱; 2. 放棄你; 3. 來不及說再見; 4. 愛的抱抱 (Tye's SupaLover Remix) |
| Warm Hands 暖暖手 | Released: 27 October 2009; Label: Seed Music; Formats: CD, digital download | Track listing: 1. 暖暖手; 2. 離開你那天 |

=== Singles ===
| Year | Title | Album |
|---|---|---|
| 2010 | "Jiggy" (with F.Cuz) | No One (Taiwan edition) |
| 2012 | "Confession of Love 愛的告白" | Confession of Love (single) |
| 2015 | "The Tag Along 紅衣小女孩" | Non-album single |

== Published works ==
- Kuo, Shu-yao (2016). Love, Infinity ∞. Taipei: Indigo Films International. ISBN 9789869355117.

== Awards and nominations ==
| Year | Award | Category | Nominated work | Result |
|---|---|---|---|---|
| 2009 | 2009 TVB8 Mandarin Music On Demand Awards | Best Newcomer (Bronze) | NA | Won |
| 2013 | 50th Golden Horse Awards | Best New Performer | Step Back to Glory | Won |
| 2014 | Sanlih Drama Awards | Best Actress | Aim High | Won |
| 2014 | Sanlih Drama Awards | Best Screen Couple (with Lego Li) | Aim High | Nominated |
| 2014 | Sanlih Drama Awards | Chinese Wave Award | Aim High | Nominated |
| 2014 | Sanlih Drama Awards | Weibo Popularity Award | Aim High | Nominated |
| 2014 | 14th Chinese Film Media Awards | Best New Performer | Step Back to Glory | Won |
| 2017 | 52nd Golden Bell Awards | Best Leading Actress in a Miniseries or Television Film | The Teenage Psychic | Nominated |
| 2019 | 21st Taipei Film Awards | Best Actress | A Fool in Love, Love Like a Fool | Nominated |
