= The King of Romance =

- Promotional poster
- 如朕親臨
- Genre: Romance
- Created by: Eastern Television
- Written by: He Shu Ting (Screenwriter coordinator); Li Deng Ya; Chen Xuan; Fang Jie
- Directed by: Chen Jia Hong
- Starring: Lego Lee; Cindy Lien; Gabriel Lan; Serena Fang
- Opening theme: "It’s You" by Elvis Tian
- Ending theme: "Broken Heart 不要再見面" by Elvis Tian
- Country of origin: Taiwan
- Original language: Mandarin
- No. of episodes: 17

Production
- Producer: Liao Jian Xing
- Production location: Taiwan
- Running time: 90 minutes (Episode 1-16); 110 minutes (Episode 17)

Original release
- Network: TTV; EBC Variety
- Release: 3 December 2016 – 8 April 2017

Related
- Love By Design; Love, Timeless

The King of Romance (Chinese: 如朕親臨; pinyin: rú zhèn qīn lín) is a 2016 Taiwanese television series created and produced by Eastern Television. It stars Lego Li, Cindy Lien, Gabriel Lan and Serena Fang. First original broadcast began on December 3, 2016 on TTV airing every Saturday night at 10:00-11:30 pm.

== Synopsis ==
A popular Chinese folklore tells of how the Jade Emperor, the king of gods, expelled the angels Golden Boy and Jade Girl from heaven to the human world. There, they are cursed to a romance that spans seven lives, during which they could never be together. Gao Bing Bing (Cindy Lien) is a modern-day woman who believes she is the reincarnated Jade Girl. When she is reunited with two childhood friends, Wang Zhen (Lego Lee) and Li Ru Long (Gabriel Lan), can she determine which is her Golden Boy and break the ancient curse?

== Cast ==
=== Main cast ===
- Lego Lee as Wang Nuo / Wang Zhen
  - Roy Tu as young Wang Nuo / young Wang Zhen
  - Li Bin s young Wang Nuo / young Wang Zhen (stand-in)
- Cindy Lien as Gao Bing Bing
  - Wang Cai Han as young Bing Bing
- Gabriel Lan as Li Ru Long （Bruce Li）
- Serena Fang as Shen Yi Le
- Ricie Fun as Ren Ai Zhen

=== Supporting cast ===
- Yankee Yang as Fang Wen Qing (Xiao Fang)
- Una Lu as Wu Bai He
- Angel Ho as Ah Meng
- Titan Huang as Ding Xiao Qiang
- Fang Yu Xin as Qin Ai Bao
- Wu Fan as Wang Nuo and Wang Zhen’s father
- Tang Chih-wei as Ai Zhen’s father
- Lin Shi En as Bing Bing’s father
- Peace Yang as Wang Min
- High Ka as Ah Hong
- Liao Hai Cheng as Ah Qi
- Money Chien as Gui Lian

=== Cameo ===
- Hsiao-Lao Lin as Zhou Xiu Qin
- Cai Cheng Yi as plumber
- Yang Sheng Da as Da Pang
- Liu Guo Shao as Lu Rui Yang (Xiao Lu)
- Lin Rou Jun as Ah Xing
- Lai Pei En as nursing staff
- Lin Shu Han (Ah Tui) as nursing staff
- Jin Mei Man as Grandma Wu
- Lin Mo Xi as Pei Pei

== Soundtrack ==
- It’s You by Elvis Tian
- Broken Heart 不要再見面 by Elvis Tian
- Pinky Swear 打勾勾 by Elvis Tian
- The One 唯一 by Lego Lee
- Fade Out 句點 by Wang Yan Wei
- Goodbye 忙著說再見 by Yan Li Fei
- Girls Can Too by Tyler Van Den Berg
- One by Greg Nicholoson

== Broadcast ==
Network	Country	Airing Date	Timeslot
TTV	Taiwan	December 3, 2016	Saturday 10:00-11:30 pm
EBC Variety	Taiwan	December 4, 2016	Sunday 10:00-11:30 pm
Astro Shuang Xing	Malaysia	June 9, 2017	Monday to Friday 4:00-5:00 pm

== Episode ratings ==
Competing shows on rival channels airing at the same time slot were:
- CTS - Genius Go Go Go
- FTV - Just Dance
- CTV - Mr. Player
- TVBS Entertainment Channel - Stand by Me, Family Time
- PTS - Family Time

Air Date	Episode	Average Ratings	Rank
Dec 3, 2016	1	0.74	4
Dec 10, 2016	2	1.02	3
Dec 17, 2016	3	0.84	4
Dec 24, 2016	4	0.86	4
Dec 31, 2016: No episode was aired due to TTV airing of New Year’s Eve Special Program
Jan 7, 2017	5	1.05	4
Jan 14, 2017	6	1.04	4
Jan 21, 2017	7	1.02	4
Jan 28, 2017: No episode was aired due to TTV airing of Chinese New Year Special Program
Feb 4, 2017	8	1.56	2
Feb 11, 2017	9	1.39	3
Feb 18, 2017	10	1.44	2
Feb 25, 2017	11	1.27	3
Mar 4, 2017	12	1.29	3
Mar 11, 2017	13	1.43	3
Mar 18, 2017	14	1.16	4
Mar 25, 2017	15	1.27	4
Apr 1, 2017	16	1.01	4
Apr 8, 2017	17	1.77	2
Average ratings		1.19	-
