= Luo Wang-zhe =

Luo Wang-zhe (Traditional Chinese：羅旺哲，December 25, 1987—) is a Taiwanese political figure of journalist background. He is an independent politician who graduated from the Graduate Institute of Journalism at Chinese Culture University. He previously served as a senior reporter for the Eastern Broadcasting Company News and as the spokesperson for the Taipei City Government. In February 2023, he took office but resigned from his position as the spokesperson of the Taipei City Government less than two months into his tenure.
