= Love @ Seventeen =

2016 Taiwanese television series

- Promotional poster
- 我和我的十七歲
- Genre: Romance, Comedy, School
- Created by: Eastern Television
- Written by: Yu Yuan Yuan 禹元元 (ep 1-10); Cai Fang Yun 蔡芳紜 (ep 1-10); Sun Shi Fan 孫詩帆 (ep 1-10); Du Xin Yi 杜欣怡 (ep 10-15); Wang Yu Qi 王玉琪 (ep 10-15); Firdaus Zhou 周菲賤 (ep 11-15)
- Directed by: Chou Hsiao-Peng 周曉鵬 (ep 1-3); Lin Qing Zhen 林清振 (ep 3-12); Yu Zhong Zhong 于中中 (ep 12-15); Huang Tian Ren 黃天仁 (ep 13-15)
- Starring: Lego Lee; Nikki Hsieh 謝欣穎; Edison Wang 王家梁; Amanda Chou 周曉涵; Alina Cheng 鄭茵聲
- Opening theme: My Only Love by Alan Ko 柯有倫 & Min-Chen 林明禎
- Ending theme: A Better Tomorrow 以後以後 by Shennio Lin 林芯儀
- Country of origin: Taiwan
- Original languages: Mandarin; Hokkien; English; Cantonese; Japanese
- No. of seasons: 1
- No. of episodes: 15

Production
- Producer: Huang Wan Bo 黃萬伯
- Production location: Taiwan
- Running time: 90 minutes (ep 1-14); 105 minutes (ep 15)
- Production company: Bethel Production Company 伯特利影像製作有限公司

Original release
- Network: TTV; EBC Variety
- Release: 9 April – 23 July 2016

Related
- Thirty Something; Love By Design

Love @ Seventeen (Chinese: 我和我的十七歲; pinyin: Wǒ hé wǒ de shíqī suì; lit. 'Me and My 17 Years Old') is a 2016 Taiwanese romantic television series created and produced by Eastern Television. Starring Lego Lee, Nikki Hsieh, Edison Wang, Amanda Chou and Alina Cheng as the main cast, filming began on February 2, 2016 and wrapped up on June 15, 2016. The initial broadcast began on April 9, 2016 on TTV airing every Saturday night at 10:00-11:30 pm.

== Cast ==
=== Main cast ===
- Lego Lee as He Hao Yi 何皓一
- Nikki Hsieh as Ai Li Si 艾麗絲
- Edison Wang as Song Han Ming 宋翰明
- Amanda Chou as Bai Shu Lei 白舒蕾
- Alina Cheng as Liu Xiao Fen 劉曉芬

=== Supporting cast ===
- Snoop Yu 余晉 as Chen Qi Tai 陳起泰
- Wang Chi-chiang as Zhao Gu Yi 趙古意
- Wish Chu as Lin Jun Xiong 林俊雄
- Ellie Tsai as Sha Sha 莎莎
- Peggy Yang as Juan Mao 捲毛
- Brian Pien as Zhou Ji Mi 周吉米（Jimmy）

=== Cameos ===
- Chu Lu-hao as Hao Yi and Xiao Fen's father
- Chang Chiung-tzu as Hao Yi and Xiao Fen's mother
- Yang Hsiu-hui as Li Si's mother
- Wang Tao-nan as Bai Guo Dong 白國棟
- Liao Li-ling 廖梨伶 as Teacher Ye
- Tu Kai-hsiang 涂凱祥 as Xu Ming De 徐明德
- Firdaus Zhou as Zhang Jiao Guan 張教官
- Tang Chih-wei as Wang Bai Jun 王柏鈞
- Lin Juo-chun as Ya Li 雅莉
- Tsai Ming-chin
- Lin Wei-ting
- ?? as Mr. Hunter
- Li You-ju 李又汝 as Manager
- Lin Hsiu-chin 林秀琴 as Sister Chen
- Chin Yang as Director Wang
- ?? as Tony
- Mario Pu as Brother De

== Soundtrack ==
Love @ Seventeen Original TV Soundtrack (OST)

Soundtrack album by Various artists
- Released: 30 June 2016
- Genre: Mandopop
- Language: Mandarin
- Label: Seed Music Co., Ltd.

Love @ Seventeen Original TV Soundtrack (OST) (我和我的十七歲 電視原聲帶) was released on June 30, 2016 by various artists under Seed Music Co., Ltd. It contains 15 tracks total, in which 10 songs are various versions of the original songs. The opening theme is track 1 " My Only Love" by Alan Ko 柯有倫 feat. Min-Chen 林明禎, while the closing theme is track 2 "A Better Tomorrow 以後以後" by Shennio Lin 林芯儀.

=== Track listing ===
| No. | Title | Singer(s) | Length |
|---|---|---|---|
| 1. | "My Only Love" | Alan Ko 柯有倫 feat. Min-Chen 林明禎 | 3:40 |
| 2. | "A Better Tomorrow" (以後以後) | Shennio Lin 林芯儀 | 3:55 |
| 3. | "Shade of the Dream" (夢的顏色) | Jing Boran 井柏然 | 3:23 |
| 4. | "Where's Our Love" (愛情掉在哪裡) | Jing Boran 井柏然 | 5:03 |
| 5. | "I ‘m Still Here For You" (現在，你在哪裡？) | Victor Wong 品冠 | 3:46 |
| 6. | "My Only Love (Adolescence)" (My Only Love (綻放青春版)) | Instrumental | 3:39 |
| 7. | "Shade of the Dream (Simple Life)" (夢的顏色 (簡單生活版)) | Instrumental | 3:22 |
| 8. | "Where's Our Love (Remembrance)" (愛情掉在哪裡 (回憶愛情版)) | Instrumental | 5:04 |
| 9. | "I ‘m Still Here For You (Wonderful Days)" (現在，你在哪裡？ (美好歲月版)) | Instrumental | 3:47 |
| 10. | "My Only Love (Ballad)" (My Only Love (輕快民謠版)) | Instrumental | 2:26 |
| 11. | "Shade of the Dream (Warmth)" (夢的顏色 (溫暖力量版)) | Instrumental | 2:35 |
| 12. | "Where's Our Love (Sentimental)" (愛情掉在哪裡 (淡淡傷感版)) | Instrumental | 3:16 |
| 13. | "I ‘m Still Here For You (Regretful Love)" (現在，你在哪裡？ (遺憾愛情版)) | Instrumental | 2:45 |
| 14. | "I ‘m Still Here For You (Emotional)" (現在，你在哪裡？ (濃郁情感版)) | Instrumental | 2:30 |
| 15. | "My Only Love (Happiness)" (My Only Love (溫暖微笑版)) | Instrumental | 2:38 |

Songs not featured on the official soundtrack album.

- Mid-Session Interval by Dark Captain Light Captain
- First Dance 第一支舞 by Zhou Bing Jun 周秉鈞 & Yang Hai-Wei 楊海薇

== Broadcast ==
| Network | Country | Airing Date | Timeslot |
|---|---|---|---|
| TTV | Taiwan | April 9, 2016 | Saturday 10:00-11:30 pm |
| EBC Variety | Taiwan | April 10, 2016 | Sunday 10:00-11:30 pm |
| Astro Shuang Xing | Malaysia | November 11, 2016 | Monday to Friday 4:00-5:00 pm |
| UNTV | Philippines | This 2021 | TBA |

== Episode ratings ==
Competing shows on rival channels airing at the same time slot were:

- CTS - Genius Go Go Go
- FTV - Just Dance
- CTV - Mr. Player

| Air Date | Episode | Average Ratings | Rank |
|---|---|---|---|
| Apr 9, 2016 | 1 | 0.74 | 4 |
| Apr 16, 2016 | 2 | 1.08 | 4 |
| Apr 23, 2016 | 3 | 0.87 | 4 |
| Apr 30, 2016 | 4 | 1.08 | 4 |
| May 7, 2016 | 5 | 1.03 | 4 |
| May 14, 2016 | 6 | 0.91 | 4 |
| May 21, 2016 | 7 | 0.98 | 4 |
| May 28, 2016 | 8 | 0.84 | 4 |
| Jun 4, 2016 | 9 | 0.74 | 4 |
| Jun 11, 2016 | 10 | 0.99 | 4 |
| Jun 18, 2016 | 11 | 0.68 | 4 |
June 25, 2016: Airing of "27th Golden Melody Awards"
| Jul 2, 2016 | 12 | 0.69 | 4 |
| Jul 9, 2016 | 13 | 0.85 | 4 |
| Jul 16, 2016 | 14 | 0.94 | 3 |
| Jul 23, 2016 | 15 | 0.91 | 4 |
| Average ratings | | 0.87 | -- |
