= EBC Asia =

Television channel

- Country: Taiwan
- Broadcast area: Hong Kong; Singapore; Malaysia; China; Vietnam; Indonesia; Macau; Thailand
- Network: Eastern Television
- Headquarters: Taipei, Taiwan

Programming
- Picture format: 16:9

History
- Launched: 2002

Links
- Website: http://ebcasiatv.com/

EBC Asia (Chinese: 東森亞洲衛視; pinyin: Dōngsēn yazhou weishi) is television's Eastern Asian entertainment channel. This channel launched in 2002. First available in Hong Kong and Singapore.

EBC Asia Channel is a variety channel designed for Asian viewers featuring a diverse selection of EBC news, variety, cuisine and travel programmes From Domestic Channels such as EBC Variety, EBC Super TV, Certainly also Aired some Current Affairs Shows from EBC News or EBC Financial News Channel, but some EBC Original Dramas not Available on EBC Asia, This Channel is Available on Hong Kong, Macau, Singapore, Malaysia (discontinued) and Indonesia, Also Received Satellite Across Asia Pacific Countries such as Thailand, Myanmar, Laos, Cambodia, Australia, New Zealand and More.
