= Love Cheque Charge =

Taiwanese television series (2014)

- Promotional poster
- Also known as: Happiness Coupon
- 幸福兌換券
- Genre: Romance; Comedy; Fantasy
- Created by: Sanlih E-Television
- Written by: Zheng Ying Min 鄭英敏; Lin Pei Yu 林珮瑜; Chen Xin Ying 陳妡盈; Qiu Wan Wei 邱婉薇; Lai Wan Rong 賴婉容; Huang Xuan Ying 黃宣穎
- Directed by: Wu Meng En 吳蒙恩
- Starring: George Hu; Phoebe Yuan; KunDa Hsieh; Jay Shih; Smile Weng; Jet Chao; Jessie Chang
- Opening theme: "Love Is 愛就是" by George Hu
- Ending theme: "I Still Love You 我還是愛著你" by Magic Power
- Country of origin: Taiwan
- Original languages: Mandarin; Taiwanese
- No. of seasons: 1
- No. of episodes: 74

Production
- Executive producer: Liu Qiu Ping 劉秋平
- Producers: Guo Jian Hong 郭建宏; Zhang Man Na 張曼娜; Chen Xiu Qing 陳秀卿
- Production location: Taiwan
- Running time: 47 minutes
- Production companies: Sanlih E-Television; TransWorld Production Co.

Original release
- Network: SETTV
- Release: 3 September – 15 December 2014

Related
- Tie The Knot; Dear Mom

Love Cheque Charge (Chinese: 幸福兌換券; pinyin: xìng fú duì huàn quàn) is a 2014 Taiwanese romantic-fantasy comedy television series produced by Sanlih E-Television. Starring George Hu and Phoebe Yuan as the main leads, the supporting cast includes KunDa Hsieh, Jay Shih, Smile Weng, Jet Chao and Jessie Chang. The Chinese title literally translates to "Happiness Coupon", which is in reference to a promise between the two main characters. Filming took place from August 15, 2014 till December 12, 2014 and was filmed as the drama aired. The first original broadcast began September 3, 2014 on SETTV channel, airing weekly from Monday till Friday at 8:00-9:00 pm. The last of the 74 episodes aired on December 15, 2014.

== Synopsis ==
In Summer 2011 Shi Bo Hai (KunDa Hsieh) asks a stranger to help him pass a message to his girlfriend. That stranger Thomas He Bu Fan (George Hu) meets up with Bo Hai's girlfriend Angel Xu Man Man (Phoebe Yuan) to tell her that Bo Hai wants to break up with her. She becomes so distraught with emotions that she makes a scene in public. To calm her down Bu Fan writes an agreement on a traveler’s check, that he will marry her if she does not get married by age thirty. Xu Man Man heartbroken leaves with the check in her hand, but what she doesn't know is that Bo Hai was involve in an accident and did not want her to mourn for his death. Three years past and in Autumn 2014, He Bu Fan unsatisfied with his life in the US returns to Taiwan. On his first day back in Taiwan he encounters Xu Man Man on the metro. He does not remember her but she remembers him and shows him the check as she wants him to hold up to his promise three years ago, in attempt to pull a prank on him: He Bu Fan said that he always fulfills his promises.

== Cast ==
=== Main cast ===
Both characters appeared in all 74 episodes.

- George Hu as Thomas He Bu Fan
- Phoebe Yuan as Angel Xu Man Man

=== Supporting cast ===
- KunDa Hsieh as Shi Bo Hai, Angel Hsu Man Man 's ex boyfriend
- Jay Shih as Wang Bai Hao, Tian Xin Ping 's Boyfriend
- Smile Weng as Tian Xin Ping, Wang Bai Hao 's Girlfriend
- Jet Chao as He Guan Yu, Wang Qian Qian 's husband
- Jessie Chang as Wang Qian Qian, He Guan Yu's wife
- Amanda Liu as Liu Yi Zhi, Angel Hsu Man Man' s friend
- Liao Jun as He Guang Hui, He Bu Fan and He Guan Yu's Father
- Jian Chang as Wang Jin Rong, Wang Bai Hao's Father
- Grace Ko as Chen Yue Yun, He Bu Fan's aunt
- Liao Jin De as Gao Qing Zhì, He Bu Fan and He Guan Yu's cousin
- Titan Huang as Shi Di Fen (Steven), a colleague
- LeLe as Hsu Le Le, Hsu Man Man 's younger sister
- RouRou as Hsu Rou Rou, Hsu Man Man 's younger sister
- Shuai Bao as Hsu Tian Tian, Hsu Man Man 's younger brother
- Lo Pei An as Hsu Jia Bao, Hsu Man Man's father
- Doris Kuang as Qiu Ya Ni, Hsu Man Man's mother
- Cherry Hsia as Rebecca Lei Bei Zhi, He Guan Yu 's ex girlfriend
- Wang Juan as Tang Ru Juan, He Bu Fan's deceased mother
- Lene Lai as Victoria Sun Wei Ya, He Bu Fan's ex girlfriend

=== Guest cast ===
- Calvin Lee as Don Chen Shao Yang
- Gan De Men as old man Jiang
- Chen Bor-jeng as Moon God
- Rex Wu as Rebecca's affair

== Soundtrack ==
- Love Is 愛就是 by George Hu
- I Still Love You 我還是愛著你 by Magic Power
- Secretly 偷偷的 by Magic Power MP
- I Don't Think So 我不以為 by Della Ding Dang
- I Don't Love You That Much 我沒那麼愛你 by Della Ding Dang
- Better Than Pride 不如驕傲 by Della Ding Dang
- Don't Say Good Bye 別說Good Bye by George Hu
- Unable To Say I Love You 說不出我愛你 by George Hu
- What's Next? 接下來是什麼 by Ann Bai
- Sad Stop 悲傷止步 by Yvonne Hsieh
- Correct 無誤 by Yvonne Hsieh

== Development and casting ==
- Sanlih held a press conference on July 31, 2014 showcasing their four main in-house contractual lead actors (Lego Lee, Chris Wang, George Hu and Lin Yo Wei) and announcing the upcoming dramas for the later half of 2014 schedule lineup.
- On August 15, 2014 a press conference was held to introduce the three main leads and the plot of the drama.
- A press conference was held on September 2, 2014 at SETTV headquarters auditorium introducing the entire cast of the drama.

== Publications ==
* 26 September 2014 : Iwalker No.05 Oct/Nov 2014 (愛玩客 第5期/2014) - barcode 4717095572690 Sanlih 三立電視 - Author: Sanlih E-Television 三立電視監製

For the October/November 2014 issue of iwalker magazine, "Love Cheque Charge" lead actors George Hu and Phoebe Yuan are featured on the cover.

* 3 October 2014 : S-Pop Vol. 21 Oct 2014 (華流 10月號/2014) - barcode 4717095578616 - Author: Sanlih E-Television 三立電視監製

For the October 2014 issue of S-Pop magazine, two of three covers published was devoted to "Love Cheque Charge". Both covers of the magazine are the regular editions published. One cover featured George Hu alone the other feature both Hu and lead actress Phoebe Yuan.

== Broadcast ==
Network	Country	Airing Date	Timeslot
SETTV	Taiwan	September 3, 2014	Monday to Friday 8:00-9:00 pm
ETTV	Taiwan	September 3, 2014	Monday to Friday 10:00-11:00 pm
Astro Shuang Xing	Malaysia	September 18, 2014	Monday to Friday 6:30-7:30 pm
Astro Shuang Xing HD	Malaysia	November 18, 2014	Sunday to Thursday 6:00-7:00 pm
StarHub TV	Singapore	October 7, 2014	Monday to Friday 7:00-8:00 pm
GMM25	Thailand	July 4, 2015	Saturday 7:00 pm

== Episode ratings ==
Competing dramas on rival channels airing at the same time slot were:
- TTV - Monga Woman, Prince William
- SET - Ordinary Love
- FTV - Dragon Dance
- CTS - Unique Flavor, Empress Ki, We Get Married
- CTV - Perfect Couple, The Glamorous Imperial Concubine, The Virtuous Queen of Han, Heroes of Sui and Tang Dynasties

Air Date	Episodes	Weekly Average Ratings	Rank
September 3-2, 2014	1-3	1.07	5
September 8–12, 2014	4-8	1.06	4
September 15–19, 2014	9-13	1.06	4
September 22–26, 2014	14-18	1.04	4
September 29-October 3, 2014	19-23	1.10	4
October 6–10, 2014	24-28	1.03	4
October 13–17, 2014	29-33	1.02	4
October 20–24, 2014	34-38	1.07	4
October 27–31, 2014	39-43	1.14	4
November 3–7, 2014	44-48	1.05	4
November 10–14, 2014	49-53	1.01	5
November 17–21, 2014	54-58	1.01	5
November 24–28, 2014	59-63	1.02	3
December 1–5, 2014	64-68	1.06	3
December 8–12, 2014	69-73	1.16	3
December 15, 2014	74	1.40	
Average ratings		1.06	

== Awards and nominations ==
Year	Ceremony	Category	Nominee	Result
2014	2014 Sanlih Drama Awards 華劇大賞	Best Actor Award	George Hu	Nominated
2014	2014 Sanlih Drama Awards 華劇大賞	Best Actress Award	Phoebe Yuan	Nominated
2014	2014 Sanlih Drama Awards 華劇大賞	Best Crying Award	George Hu & Liao Jun	Nominated
2014	2014 Sanlih Drama Awards 華劇大賞	Best Lady Killer Award	Jian Chang	Nominated
2014	2014 Sanlih Drama Awards 華劇大賞	Best Foolishly Award	Grace Ko	Nominated
2014	2014 Sanlih Drama Awards 華劇大賞	China Wave Award	George Hu	Nominated
2014	2014 Sanlih Drama Awards 華劇大賞	Weibo Popularity Award	George Hu	Nominated
2014	2014 Sanlih Drama Awards 華劇大賞	Viewers Choice Drama Award	Love Cheque Charge	Nominated
