= King Flower =

- Promotional poster
- Also known as: Substitute Princess 公主的替身
- 金大花的華麗冒險
- Genre: Romance, Comedy
- Created by: Chen Xin Guo (陳興國)
- Written by: Chen Hong Jie (陳虹潔); Luo Xi Ni(羅茜妮); Yang Bi Feng (楊碧鳳)
- Directed by: Zhang Zhe Shu (張哲書); Hu Yi Juan (胡意涓)
- Starring: James Wen; Nikki Hsieh; Chris Wu
- Opening theme: "因為有你在" (Because You're There) by Dream Girls
- Ending theme: "像女孩的女人" (A Girl Like A Woman) by S.H.E
- Country of origin: Taiwan
- Original languages: Mandarin; Hokkien
- No. of series: 1
- No. of episodes: 21

Production
- Production location: Taiwan
- Running time: 90 minutes
- Production company: SETTV

Original release
- Network: TTV; SET Metro
- Release: 6 January – 2 June 2013

Related
- Miss Rose; Love Around

King Flower (Chinese: 金大花的華麗冒險) is a 2013 Taiwanese comedy romance television series. It was produced by SETTV and started filming on November 26, 2012. It stars James Wen and Nikki Hsieh. It was first aired on January 6, 2013 on TTV.

== Synopsis ==
The ugly Jin Da Hua has buck-teeth and a large mole on her face which causes her to be teased and ridiculed all her life. She daydreams that if she could only be as beautiful as Du Liang Yan- Ouyang Tai's fiancé, Da Hua's best friend, Lin Guan Jun, might fall in love with her. Due to a hiking accident, Liang Yan falls off a cliff while on a trip with her fiancé. Just because Da Hua has a slight resemblance, she is given a chance to change her life as she undergoes plastic surgery and assumes Du Liang Yan's name and identity.

== Cast ==
=== Main cast ===
- Chris Wu as Ouyang Tai

Ouyang Tai, the GM of Shen Da Realty, was engaged to Du Liang Yan who was severely injured during an accident. He found Jin Da Hua to replace his fiancé temporarily. As time passes, he learns that his fiancé has died. At that difficult time, Jin Da Hua comforts him and stays by his side which makes him fall in love with her.

- Nikki Hsieh as Jin Da Hua / Du Liang Yan

Jin Da Hua, a 28-year-old female is the daughter of a provision shop owner. She is enthusiastic and cheerful girl since she was young but because of malocclusion and a mole on an awkward part of her forehead, she was always bullied by the other kids. Da Hua hopes that one day she would be able to give her first kiss and also her 'first time' to her childhood crush, Lin Guan Jun. After coincidentally meeting Du Liang Yan and her fiancé, Ouyang Tai, in her family opened convenient store, she was thinking if she one day becomes as beautiful as Du Liang Yan. Would Guan Jun accept her love for him? After owing a debt of 2 million from illegal money lenders, Jin Da Hua had no choice but to undergo plastic surgery and take up Du Liang Yan's name to impersonate Ouyang Tai's fiancé.

Du Liang Yan, a 28-year-old lady is the manager of the design department in Shen Da Corporation. Liang Yan is beautiful, intelligent, kind, quiet and is also good at playing the piano. She is engaged to Ouyang Tai and is very much in love with each other. Since she was young, Liang Yan was the apple to her father's eye and always tries to live up to her father's expectations. Liang Yan tries not to do anything dangerous or risky because she doesn't want her father to worry about her. But she has always wanted to try something thrilling so Liang Yan begged Ouyang to go hiking knowing that he loved to hike. However, Liang Yan fell when she was halfway up the mountain during the hike. She was rushed to the hospital immediately.

- James Wen as Lin Guan Jun

After losing his parents when he was just a child, Lin Guan Jun was adopted and raised by Jin Da Hua's mother. Having growing up together with Da Hua, Guan Jun always bickered with Da Hua but he protects and looks after Da Hua like his own younger sister. Although knowing that Da Hua has feelings for him, he tries to avoid the topic because of Da Hua's looks, but he is also unable to hide his love for her. Working as a delivery man, Guan Jun likes to gamble during his free time and after creating trouble, he always runs back to the Jin's family convenient store to hide. But if he's faced with serious trouble, he would not hesitate to protect his loved ones from getting hurt.

=== Extended cast ===
- Lene Lai as Yu Kai Le - Supervisor of the secretary in Shen Da Corporation and dreams of one day becoming Ouyang's wife.
- Zhao Jun Ya (趙駿亞) as Qin Mo

Market Place

- Kuo Shu-yao as Ah Xi - Employee of a florist and is Da Hua's best friend
- Hsueh Shih-ling as Jin Da Li - Da Hua's younger brother
- Tai Bao (太保) as Jin Zheng Yin
- Yang Li-yin as Xia Chun Jiao/Mama Jin
- Yuan Ai Fei (袁艾菲) as Hu Xiao Fei
- Luo Bei An as Hu Jin Biao
- Frankie Huang as Xiao Dao

Sheng Da Corporation

- Jian Chang as Ouyang Feng
- Lin Xiu Jun (林秀君) as He Xiu Xiu
- Wang Juan as Yan Li Ting
- Chen Zhi Qiang (陳志強) as Ouyang Sen
- Yin Fu (茵芙) as Xu Wei Ni
- Guan Yong (關勇) as Du Sheng Heng
- Li Yi Jin (李依瑾) as Zhao Pei Qi
- Zhuang Zhuang (壯壯) as Ma Cheng Hong
- Yang Han (楊瀚) as Yang Zu Rong
- Wu Jia Wei (吳迦瑋) as Qi Qi

== Soundtrack ==
The series did not release an original soundtrack. However, songs are used in the series. In particular, the series had five songs from different artists, released in their respective albums. The opening theme song used is "Yin Wei You Ni Zai" or "Because You're There" by Dream Girls, while the ending theme song used is by S.H.E entitled "像女孩的女人" or "A Girl Like A Woman".

=== Track listing ===
No.	Title	Lyrics	Music	Singer	Length
1.	"Because You're There" (因為有你在)	Tian Le (天樂)	KATRINA. NOORBERGEN、NICHOLAS F. CARBONE、ANTHONY J. NATOLI	Dream Girls - Girl's Talk album
2.	"The Innocent Women" (像女孩的女人)	Wang Zhen Shen (王振聲)	Guo Wen Zong (郭文宗)	S.H.E - Blossomy album
3.	"Memorable Day" (紀念日)	Chen Xin Yang (陳信延)	Real (R) of F.I.R	Aaron Yan - The Moment album
4.	"Why Bother" (何苦)	Albert Leung		James Wen - James Wen debut album
5.	"Repair Me" (還我)	Xu Min Ling (徐旻鈴)	Liu Yin (劉寅)	S.H.E - Blossomy album

== Broadcast ==
Country	Network	Timeslot	Episode premiere
Taiwan	TTV	Sundays, 10PM	January 6, 2013
Taiwan	SETTV	Saturdays, 10PM	January 12, 2013
Taiwan	ETTV	Sundays, 7:30PM	January 13, 2013
Singapore	Starhub TV	Saturdays, 8PM	April 6, 2013

== Episode ratings ==
Since its first broadcast, King Flower topped the ranks with the total average of 1.57. Its drama competitors were CTV's Borrow Your Love, CTS's K Song Lover, and FTV's The Queen of SOP. The viewers survey was conducted by AGB Nielsen.

Date of Broadcast	Episode	Average Ratings	Rank	Behind-the-scenes average ratings	Remarks
2013/01/06	01	1.29	1	0.67	1.78 (Note: Maximum instantaneous viewing.)
2013/01/13	02	1.46	1	0.88	1.74
2013/01/20	03	1.84	1	1.08	2.43
2013/01/27	04	1.54	1	0.99	1.95
2013/02/03	05	2.14	1	1.34	
February 10, 2013 broadcast was suspended due to the special broadcast episode of "蛇來運轉迎新春".
2013/02/17	06	1.68	1	0.72	
2013/02/24	07	1.37	1	0.69	
2013/03/03	08	1.44	1	0.87	
2013/03/10	09	1.42	1	0.65	
2013/03/17	10	1.37	1	0.72	
2013/03/24	11	1.45	1	-	
2013/03/31	12	1.64	1	-	
2013/04/07	13	1.56	1	-	
2013/04/14	14	1.36	1	-	
2013/04/21	15	1.43	1	-	
2013/04/28	16	1.91	1	-	
2013/05/05	17	1.43	1	-	
2013/05/12	18	1.70	1	-	
2013/05/19	19	1.48	1	-	
2013/05/26	20	1.43	1	-	
2013/06/02	21	2.00	1	-	
Total average		1.57		-	-
