= Meet Me @ 1006 =

- Official poster
- Chinese: 1006的房客
- Literal meaning: Tenants in 1006
- Hanyu Pinyin: Yīlínglíngliù de Fángkè
- Written by: Fei Gongyi; Chen Xuan; Fang Jie
- Directed by: Chen Ronghui
- Starring: Lego Lee; Nikki Hsieh; Ken Hsieh; Tender Huang; Aggie Hsieh; Greg Han
- Country of origin: Taiwan
- Original language: Mandarin
- No. of episodes: 26

Production
- Running time: 45 minutes

Original release
- Release: 14 March – 7 June 2018

Meet Me @ 1006 is a 2018 Taiwanese fantasy television series with time-travel, romance, and crime/suspense elements. The series stars Nikki Hsieh as a rookie TV reporter and Lego Lee as a disgraced trial attorney from 2018, who become roommates every day between 10:06 pm and 10:52 pm during which their apartment undergoes an apparent time-space merge. When the attorney realizes that the girl knows his former client, he wonders if he can prevent the unsolved 2017 murder which caused his downfall.

The show generated more than 10 million views on the streaming website iQiyi Taiwan, making it the second most-watched series in iQiyi Taiwan's history, behind only the 2018 Chinese TV series Old Boy.

== Synopsis ==
The story begins with a court case in which Ke Zhen Yu (Lego Lee) is the defense lawyer for Wu Ji Rao (Aggie Hsieh). Wu Ji Rao is accused of using a very large trophy to murder her husband Jiang Cheng Hao (Ryan Kuo), a martial arts master. Mo Si Ming (Kunda Hsieh) is the prosecutor for the case. However, Ke Zhen Yu's lawyer license is suspended due to supposed evidence of him manipulating evidence to the case. As Ke Zhen Yu leaves the court house, he then spots an origami on the floor and takes it with him. His career ruined, he has to move to a cheaper apartment. He soon starts to hear noises and voices every evening, but assumes that it's a hallucination due to drinking. But one night, while he's sleeping, he wakes up to see a woman lying asleep next to him, and unknowingly grabbing onto him. . The woman, Cheng Jia (Nikki Hsieh), is a rookie reporter who used to be a tenant in the same apartment. After a few more encounters, we understand that the reason for everything is the origami, which possesses supernatural powers and every evening, from 10:06 pm to 10:52 pm, turns back the time to several months into the past. Realizing that he is brought back to the past, before Jiang Cheng Hao was murdered Ke Zhen Yu desperately tries to change the events and prevent the murder. Cheng Jia Le is happy to help, because it so happened that she was very close friends with the victim. Their attempts are not successful and the murder still happens due to lack of clues. Due to their intervention the time and date of the murder is altered, but Wu Ji Rao is still charged.

As Cheng Jia Le's life continues in her time frame, she encounters the (past) Ke Zhen Yu, who is still a lawyer and often is not very nice to her. Meanwhile, the present Ke Zhen Yu begins to have memories of the past being altered including his past self having not so nice interactions with Cheng Jia Le and he begins to realize his past self was very egotistic and arrogant. Cheng Jia Le is aware that the Ke Zhen Yu she sees in her own time is different from the future Ke Zhen Yu she meets in her apartment every night.

The pair discovers that the person responsible for Jiang Cheng Hao's murder is Wu Han Wen, a man who grew up with Wu Ji Rao, the two considering each other as siblings. Wu Ji Rao knows everything but has been protecting him. However, she eventually becomes mentally insane and is placed in a mental health institution. The interventions in the past start changing many circumstances in the present. The present time Ke Zhen Yu discovers that Zhang De Pei (Yang Yong Wei), a martial student of Jiang Cheng Hao is going to kill Cheng Jia Le with a needle injection, in an attempt to silence her from revealing the truth. When the present Ke Zhen Yu is brought back to the past, he attempts to stop it, but he is stabbed with the needle instead and then Cheng Jie Le chases down and throws down Zhang De Pei to let the police arrest him. Cheng Jia Le, who is already in love with Ke Zhen Yu of the future, holds onto him, but he disappears.

Now we are in Cheng Jia Le's time frame. She is no longer able to go into the future to see the future Ke Zhen Yu. The Ke Zhen Yu in Cheng Jia Le's time frame, thanks to the alterations of the past events, is still a lawyer. However, the current Ke Zhen Yu in Cheng Jia Le's time frame had picked up the origami that Cheng Jia Le had in her pocket, and had dropped when Zhang De Pei tried to kill her. Ke Zhen Yu, due to the origami now in his possession, begins having memories of himself several months into the future, including his meeting Cheng Jia Le. He eventually remembers all of his future encounters and interactions with Cheng Jia Le and they become a couple, starting to live together permanently.

== Cast ==
=== Main ===
- Lego Lee as Ke Zhen Yu, a lawyer
- Nikki Hsieh as Cheng Jia Le, rookie reporter who used to be a tenant in Ke Zhen Yu's apartment

=== Supporting ===
- Aggie Hsieh as Wu Ji Rao, a woman accused of her husband's murder
- Kunda Hsieh as Mo Si Ming, the prosecutor for the case
- Yang Yong Wei as Zhang De Pei, a martial student of Jiang Cheng Hao
- Greg Han Hsu as Chou Ta-Chun
- Kunda Hsieh as Mu Ssu-Ming
- Juno Liu as Hsiao Man-Man
- Tender Huang as Wu Han-Wen, Wu Ji Rao's childhood friend
- Ryan Kuo as Chiang Cheng-Hao, Wu Ji Rao's husband and Cheng Jia Le's friend, a martial arts master with his own training center. He is murdered in mysterious circumstances.

=== Cameo ===
- Megan Lai as Chen Yu-Fang

== Broadcast ==
- iQiyi Taiwan (March 14, 2018), Taiwan Television (March 14, 2018), Eastern Television (March 17, 2018)
- (Malaysia) Shuang Xing (March 14, 2018)
- (China) iQiyi (August 7, 2018)

== Awards and nominations ==
- 2018 53rd Golden Bell Awards
  - Nominated - Best Supporting Actress in a Television Series, Aggie Hsieh
- 2019 Asian Academy Creative Awards
  - Nominated - Best Original Programme by a Streamer/OTT, Meet Me @ 1006

== See also ==
- How Long Will I Love U, a 2018 Chinese film with a similar premise
