= Lorene Jen =

Taiwanese actress, model and singer

- 任容萱
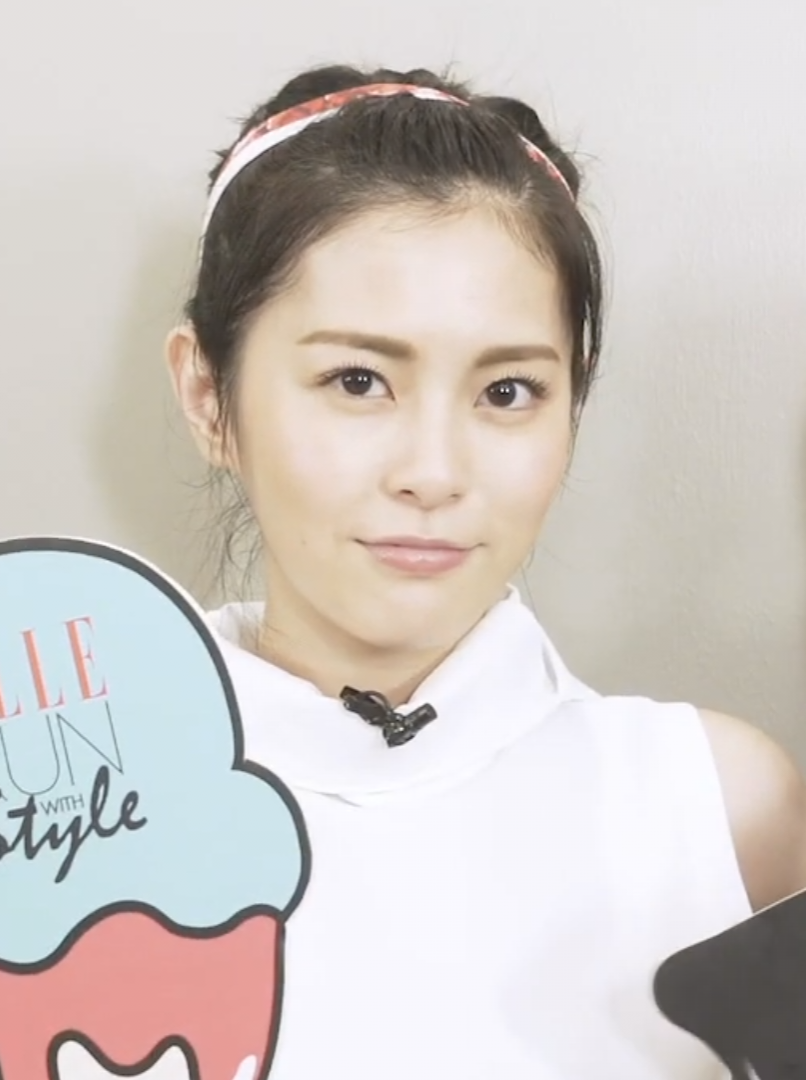
- Jen in 2019
- Born: 22 November 1988 (age 37); Taipei, Taiwan
- Education: National Taiwan Normal University
- Occupations: Actress, model, singer
- Years active: 2009–present
- Parents: Milton Jen (father); Zheng Rui Lan (mother)
- Family: Selina Jen (sister)

Chinese name
- Chinese: 任容萱
Transcriptions
Standard Mandarin
- Hanyu Pinyin: Rèn Róngxuān
Southern Min
- Hokkien POJ: Jîm Iông-soan

Lorene Jen (Chinese: 任容萱; pinyin: Rén Róngxuān; Pe̍h-ōe-jī: Jîm Iông-soan; born 22 November 1988), previously known as Kirsten Jen, is a Taiwanese actress, model and singer. Her surname is sometimes spelled as Jen. She is the younger sister of Taiwanese girl group S.H.E member Selina Jen. Jen graduated from National Taiwan Normal University, with a bachelor's degree in home economics, human development and family studies.

== Early life ==
Lorene Jen was born on 22 November 1988, in Taipei, Taiwan. Her father, Milton Jen, has ancestral home in Dazhou, Sichuan, used to be a technology company executive and now works as a part-time actor. Her mother is Zheng Ruilan, a homemaker. Jen is the youngest of a two child family. Her older sister is Taiwanese girl group S.H.E member Selina Jen.

Jen attended National Taiwan Normal University and graduated in 2011 with a bachelor's degree in home economics, human development and family studies.

== Career ==
=== Pre-debut ===
In 2000, Taiwanese entertainment management agency HIM International Music held a "Universal 2000 Talent and Beauty Girl Contest" to search for new artistes. The winner of the contest would receive a contract from HIM. Jen wanted to participate and had registered in the contest, but was too young. Her older sister Selina entered the contest in her place and ended up winning the contest. For the next few years, Jen would then sometimes appear on variety shows as her sister's guest, appear in other artists' music videos and also appear in commercial advertisements before officially debuting in 2009.

=== Acting ===
Jen made her acting debut in 2009 starring as the lead actress in GTV's fantasy idol drama K.O.3an Guo, which is a spin-off of the popular KO One drama franchise. The drama took an entire year to film since it was split into 3 seasons with 53 episodes total. The drama helped her gain more exposure and soon she received more acting offers, usually starring as the lead or main cast.

Her most acclaimed work to date is 2013 SETTV political themed idol drama In a Good Way. The drama was praised for its original storyline. Jen played "Lin Jia En" (林嘉恩), a country girl who wanders into the big city for fun but ends up meeting and falling for "Liu Shan Feng" (劉杉峰), played by Lego Lee, the most popular guy at a college from a strong political family during the 90's in Taiwan, The drama received multi Golden Bell Awards nominations, including Best Drama at the 49th ceremony. The Pairing of Jen and Lee was also well received as the two won Best Screen Couple Award at the 2014 Sanlih Drama Awards.

=== Music ===
Jen occasionally contributes to the soundtracks of the dramas she starred in. She first sang as part of the chorus for Danson Tang's single "When Together (愛在一起)", featured in his 2007 album Love Me.

== Filmography ==
=== Television series ===
Year	Original title	English title	Role	Notes
2009	終極三國	K.O.3an Guo	Diao Chan	
2011	珍愛林北	Lin Bei	Lin Qianyu	
2011	勇士們	Soldier	Wang Xiaotao	
2011	為愛固執	Stubborn Love	Luo Peizi	
2013	我的自由年代	In a Good Way	Lin Jiaen	
2014	七個朋友	Seven Friends	Qu Xintong	
2014	青春風暴	Young Storm	Shu Pinfan	
2015	聽見幸福	Someone Like You	Liang Ruohan / Chen Yuxi	
2015	超級大英雄	The Crossing Hero	Mo Han	
2015	背着奶奶进城	Grandma Carrying City	Zhong Yuxuan	
2017	深夜食堂	Midnight Diner	Customer	Cameo
2018	我曾愛過你，想起就心酸	Once Loved You, Distressed Forever	Wu Sijia	
2020	覆活	Amensalism	Bi Kewei	
2021	華燈初上	Light the Night	Hsiao Wan-jou	

=== Feature film ===
Year	Original title	English title	Role	Notes
2012	變羊記	The Ghost Tales	Yao Luofen	
2014	早安，冬日海	Good Morning, Winter Sea	Vivian	
Unreleased	元寶C計劃	Ingot C Program	Tracy	
2016	神廚	Rookie Chef	Chiang Chi-pao	
2017	麻煩家族	What a Wonderful Family	Lin Cong	
2018	遇見下一個你	Once Again	Han Duoduo	
2019	玩命貼圖	Karma	Shen Ling	
2019	下一任：前任	Always Miss You	Huang's Girlfriend	
2019	捉妖大仙2	Immortal & Demons 2	Snow woman	
2020	驚夢49天	49 Days	Liu I-chen	

=== Short film ===
Year	Original title	English title	Role
2012	皇者風范	Royal Style	Swimmer
2013	本可改變的結局	This Can Change The Outcome	Gu Kewei

=== Music video ===
Year	Song title	Details	Video
2005	Summer Wind (夏天的風)	Singer(s): Awaking; Album: Happiness Download (幸福下載)	Video on YouTube
2006	Healed (痊癒)	Singer(s): Z-Chen 張智成; Album: Love Tree (愛情樹)	Video on YouTube
2008	Fall in Love With You (偏偏愛上你)	Singer(s): Jerry Wu 吳建飛; Album: Fall In Love With You (偏偏爱上你)	Video on YouTube
2008	After You Leave (你離開以後)	Singer(s): Jerry Wu 吳建飛; Album: Fall In Love With You (偏偏爱上你)	Video on YouTube
2008	Wine Song (酒歌)	Singer(s): Huang Yee-ling 黃乙玲; Album: Almost Hear Yourself Talk (講乎自己聽)	Video on YouTube
2008	Emotions (感情線)	Singer(s): Huang Yee-ling 黃乙玲; Album: Almost Hear Yourself Talk (講乎自己聽)	Video on YouTube
2008	Ruthless Brother (無情兄)	Singer(s): Huang Yee-ling 黃乙玲; Album: Almost Hear Yourself Talk (講乎自己聽)	Video on YouTube
2009	If I Become A Memory (如果我變成回憶)	Singer(s): Tank 呂建忠; Album: The 3rd Round (第三回合)	Video on YouTube
2009	Little Wish (小心願)	Singer(s): Champion 強辯樂團; Album: K.O.3an Guo OST (三國鼎立SUPER大鬥陣)	Video on YouTube
2011	Peu De Mémoire (微涼的記憶)	Singer(s): Chou Chuan-huing 周傳雄; Album: Peu De Mémoire (微涼的記憶)	Video on YouTube
2011	Good Love (好的愛)	Singer(s): Dave Eng 傅宇昊; Album: Good Love (好的愛)	Video on YouTube
2012	Excellent Choice (選擇出色)	Singer(s): Chen Kun 陳坤; Album: Excellent Choice (选择出色)	Video on YouTube
2012	Your A Man (你是個男人)	Singer(s): Kenny Bee 鍾鎮濤; Album: The Best Turned Out To Be The Easiest (最好的原來是最簡單的)	Video on YouTube
2013	Baby Match (北鼻麻吉)	Singer(s): Seven Friends 七個朋友; Album: Seven Friends OST (七個朋友電視原聲帶)	Video on YouTube
2013	Miss Me (想想我)	Singer(s): Sean Li 李祥祥; Album: Miss Me (想想我)	Video on YouTube
2015	The Unfinished Love (未完成的愛情)	Singer(s): Michael Wong 王光良; Album: The Unfinished Love (未完成的愛情)	Video on YouTube

== Awards and nominations ==
Year	Award	Category	Nominated work	Result
2014	Sanlih Drama Awards	Viewers Choice Drama Award (with Lego Lee)	In a Good Way	Nominated
2014	Sanlih Drama Awards	Best Actress Award	In a Good Way	Nominated
2014	Sanlih Drama Awards	Best Screen Couple Award (with Lego Lee)	In a Good Way	Won
2014	Sanlih Drama Awards	Best Kiss Award (with Lego Lee)	In a Good Way	Nominated
2014	Sanlih Drama Awards	Best Crying Award (with Lego Lee)	In a Good Way	Nominated
