= In a Good Way =

2013 Taiwanese television series

- Promo poster
- Also known as: Wǒ de zìyóu niáǹdài
- 我的自由年代
- Genre: Romance
- Created by: Sanlih E-Television
- Written by: Xu Yunqi 許芸齊; Wu Peizhen 吳佩珍; Wu Jinrong 吳瑾蓉; Lin Yuchen 林宇辰; Feng Bodi 馮勃棣
- Directed by: Wu Meng’en 吳蒙恩
- Starring: Lego Lee; Lorene Ren; Jay Shih; Smile Weng
- Opening theme: "Good Morning Hard City" by Adrian Fu
- Ending theme: "Obviously Love You 明明愛你" by Freya Lim
- Country of origin: Taiwan
- Original language: Mandarin
- No. of series: 1
- No. of episodes: 26

Production
- Executive producer: Xie Liru 謝禮如
- Producers: Lu Cheng’ai 呂承嬡; Yan Tin 顏頲
- Production location: Taiwan
- Running time: 105 minutes
- Production companies: Sanlih E-Television; TransWorld Production Co.

Original release
- Network: SETTV
- Release: 15 November 2013 – 16 May 2014

Related
- Just You; Pleasantly Surprised

In a Good Way (Chinese: 我的自由年代; pinyin: Wǒ de zìyóu niáǹdài) is a 2013 Taiwanese romantic television series produced by Sanlih. It stars Lego Lee, Lorene Ren, Jay Shih and Smile Weng. The original title literally translates as "My freedom years" which is in reference to Taiwan's government politics during the 1990s. The drama began filming on October 16, 2013 and finished on April 23, 2014. The first episode began airing on Sanlih's channel SETTV on November 15, 2013 at its Friday 10:00 PM timeslot. The final episode aired on May 16, 2014 with 26 episodes total.

The drama is set in the 1990s about University campus life and Taiwan's government political setting during that time era.

== Synopsis ==
Lin Jia En, who had no plans to leave her small town encounters a life changing experience when she becomes bored at home and sneaks off to the big city. While looking for her friend Zheng Ren Wei to help her because she got robbed in Taipei, she meets big man on campus Liu Shan Feng. He helps her and takes an interest in her. The two soon fall in love. However his family's shady past comes between them.

== Plot summary ==
During the summer of 1995, childhood friends Lin Jia En (Ren) and Zheng Ren Wei (Jay Shih) from a small town in Pingtung, take their college entrance exam together. Jia En plans to choose a college near home, while Ren Wei wants to use college as an opportunity to move to Taipei where life seems more exciting. To Jia En's surprise, who has always been a good student and had better grades then Ren Wei, she fails her exam while Ren Wei passes. Soon Ren Wei packs off to Taipei to attend the college of his choosing.

Jia En becomes bored at home waiting to retake the entrance exam. While trying to contact Ren Wei to see how he's doing in Taipei, she becomes impatient waiting for him to callback. Bored to extreme, she takes out her savings and buys a train ticket to Taipei without letting her parents know. Her plans for a fun day in Taipei is ruined when she is robbed of her belongings while browsing through the big city. With no money and no one knowing she is in Taipei she heads to find the only person she knows in the city, Ren Wei.

At Ren Wei's college she is in awe of the vibrant life style at the college campus. While walking around the campus, the basketball court gets her attention when a crowd is cheering on someone making consecutive shots. Jia En looks on from afar, but as she's about to walk away a Pomeranian dog runs her way chasing after the basketball. Jia En sees the dog and pets him. When the dog's owner comes her way to retrieve the ball and dog, the two have a brief encounter and walk away.

While trying to look for Ren Wei, Jia En reads the wrong dorm room building and number. She goes to that building to wait for Ren Wei. Feeling uneasy being glanced at in the boys dorm she waits inside the room and falls asleep. When the real occupant of the dorm room returns he becomes startled at upon finding Jia En in his room. Soon Jia En recognizes that he is the boy and dog owner she had encountered at the basketball court earlier, Liu Shan Feng (Lego Lee) .

Shan Feng is the big man on campus who is not only athletic, rich and kind but also smart with a high IQ. After Jia En explains her situation he lets her go, but later that night takes pity on her when he sees her drenched in the pouring rain for hours waiting for her friend. He takes her in that night. The two soon become acquainted and friends when he stands up for her. The two later embark on a romance together, but their relationship is interrupted when Shan Feng's family shady past comes back to haunt his family.

With his father charged in illegal government dealings, Shan Feng disappears from school and Jia En's life, only to reappear one year later at his father's court trial. However no one is able to help his father when his father is overwhelmingly accused by former associates who wants to bring him down. Knowing his father is not fully guilty with all the crimes he has been charged with, Shan Feng and his father's attorney tries to help him but Shan Feng's father refuse to divulge anything, afraid that it will ruin Shan Feng's future. Shan Feng ask for his father's trust and later becomes his attorney. Knowing fighting for his father's innocence will take years, Shan Feng breaks up with Jia En as not to be the burden that holds her back from following her own dreams to study abroad.

On the day Jia En leaves to study abroad, Ren Wei comes clean to Jia En that he switched their exams that's why Jin En had a failed exam. Instead of getting mad she thanks Ren Wei for giving her the chance to meet Shan Feng. One year later Jia En is in England writing letters home to her family and friends letting them know how she has changed and how she is doing. One of the letter is for Shan Feng. As he receives the letter and sees who it is from he gives off a sentimental smile.

== Cast ==
=== Main cast ===
- Lego Lee as Liu Shan Feng

Liu Shan Feng is a student of Cheng Dong University studying a double degree of Law and History. He is a genius with an IQ scare of 170 and is very outgoing. He comes from a family of politicians, his parents are focused on providing him with the best education. However there was never someone who truly cared for him. Ironically, Shan Feng hates the pretentiousness of politics and he is not interested in money or popularity. His father cuts him off financially, to which leads him to becoming a research assistant to earn money.

- Lorene Ren as Lin Jia En

A country girl from Ping Dong. She didn't get into Cheng Dong University, the University she wanted to attend, the first and second time she took the entry exam. She had wanted to study foreign language at Cheng Dong University. Her parents had moved to Taipei for work when she was young and left her with a family friend to look after her. She grew up with Ren Wei and follows him to Cheng Dong University. She is a strong willed girl who likes to help others but doesn't like to be helped by others. Under the most extraordinary circumstances she meets popular boy Liu Shan Feng, because of him, her world becomes wider and their world together becomes filled with secrets.

- Jay Shih as Zheng Ren Wei

Despite his grades being lower than Jia En's, he gets accepted into Cheng Dong University studying Management. He is also from the country side of Ping Dong like Jia En. His father is a majority land owner in Ping dong. He dreams of entering the entertainment world of Taipei but his family wants him to take over the family business. Ren Wei aspires to live in Taipei, find a girlfriend in Taipei and liver a wonderful exciting life. After bidding farewell to Ping Dong, he starts his University life by forming a group with his friends Zai Zai and Ah Di calling themselves "Iron Men". He falls in love with Bai Xue at first sight and pursues her but his feelings towards Jia En gradually changes as he sees changes in her.

- Smile Weng as Bai Xue Fen

Bai Xue studies Foreign Languages at Cheng Dong University and is the girl all the guys falls for at University. Her nickname is Snow White. Her parents have an old fashion traditional mindset that all males should be dominance, which makes Bai Xue strives to be independent and a strong willed women to prove her parents views wrong. She is seen by all the girls at University as being overconfident which leads to her having little female friends. Once you get to know her you'll see her nice and truthful personality. She has known Liu Shan Feng since High School and has a crush on him but because of her high self-esteem she does not let him know and waits for the day he gets a hint.

=== Supporting cast ===
- Lung Shao-hua as Chang Chia-lin
- Sun Qi Jun as Xie Qing You
- Yao Yao Chun as Liao Ri Qi
- Lu Zhen Xi as Wang Jian Guo
- Zhang Shan Wei as Zhan Zi Xi
- Lin Shu Yu as Cui Xin Qi
- Chen Zhi Qiang as Chang Fei
- Xie Li Jin as A Jin Jie
- Ma Wei Xin as You Li Jun
- Wu Jia Shan as Xue Qiu Yan
- Yang Lie as Zheng Da Wei
- Jenny Wong Zhen Ni as Ding Xiao Wei
- Shu Xue Xian as Liu Song Heng
- Doris Kuang as He Bi Wen
- Liao Jun as Lin Zhao Fu
- Ma Shi Li as Ma Li

== Soundtrack ==
In a Good Way Original TV Soundtrack (OST)

Soundtrack album by Various artists
- Released: 30 April 2014
- Genre: Mandopop
- Language: Mandarin
- Labels: Rock Records Co., Ltd. 滾石國際音樂股份有限公司

In a Good Way Original TV Soundtrack (OST) (我的自由年代 電視原聲帶) was released on April 30, 2014 by various artists under Rock Records Co., Ltd. label. It contains 13 tracks total. The opening theme is track 1 "Good Morning Hard City" by Adrian 符致逸, while the closing theme is track 3 "Obviously Love You 明明愛你" by Freya Lim 林凡.

=== Track listing ===
No.	Title	Singer(s)	Length
1.	"Good Morning Hard City"	Adrian 符致逸	4:54
2.	"So Be It, For Now" (先這樣吧)	A-Yue 張震嶽	4:18
3.	"Obviously Love You" (明明愛你)	Freya Lim 林凡	5:20
4.	"Your Rainbow" (彩虹的你)	Bobby Chen 陳昇	6:08
5.	"However" (然而(你不會知道))	Bobby Chen 陳昇	3:50
6.	"Care" (牽掛)	Wu Bai 伍佰	5:25
7.	"Free Night"	A-Yue 張震嶽	4:29
8.	"Crazy For Love" (為愛痴狂)	Rene Liu 劉若英	5:15
9.	"Love Me Don't Go" (愛我別走)	A-Yue 張震嶽	4:42
10.	"Crowded Park" (擁擠的樂園)	Bobby Chen 陳昇	3:13
11.	"The Cost of Love" (愛的代價)	Sylvia Chang 張艾嘉	5:03
12.	"Your Place to Stay in Love" (留在愛你的原地)	Instrumental	3:20
13.	"Free Soul" (自由的靈魂)	Instrumental	3:20

== Publications ==
*April 3, 2014: In a Good Way Original Novel (我的自由年代 原創小說) - ISBN 4715109123647 Taiwan Kadokawa 台灣角川書店 - Author: Sanlih E-Television 三立電視監製, Xu Yun Qi 許芸齊, Wu Pei Zhen 吳佩珍

The novel shows detailed description of each character background and follows the storyline of the drama.

*January 3, 2014 : S-Pop Vol. 13 January 2014 (華流 1月號/2014) - ISBN 4717095582248 Sanlih E-Television 三立電視 - Author: Sanlih E-Television 三立電視監製

The January 2014 issue of S-pop features leads Lego Lee and Ren on the cover of the magazine. The issue is the regular edition of the magazine which does not come with any gifts.

*April 9, 2014: S-Pop Vol. 15 April 2014 (華流 4月號/2014) - ISBN 4717095573826 Sanlih E-Television 三立電視 - Author: Sanlih E-Television 三立電視監製

A special edition of S-Pop magazine devoted entirely to the drama. This edition came with an In a Good Way sticky note pad.

*January 29, 2014: iWalker Vol. 1 February 2014 (愛玩客 1.2月號/2014 第1期) - ISBN 4717095572690 Sanlih E-Television 三立電視 - Author: Sanlih E-Television 三立電視

Two different covers featuring Lego Lee and Ren was published. Each edition came with a different gift. One edition came with lucky red envelopes featuring the main leads, the other edition came with a 2014 calendar with the drama theme.

*March 27, 2014: iWalker Vol. 2 April 2014 (愛玩客 3.4月號/2014 第2期) - ISBN 4717095572690 Sanlih E-Television 三立電視 - Author: Sanlih E-Television 三立電視

Two different covers featuring the male cast of the drama was published. One cover featured Lego Lee with co-stars Yao Yao Chun and Sun Qijun. The other cover featured Jay Shih with co-stars Lu Zhen Xi and Calvin Lee. Both editions came with complimentary washi tape with the drama logo printed on it.

== DVD release ==
- June 27, 2014: In a Good Way (DVD) (Taiwan Version) (我的自由年代 (DVD)(台灣版)) - Cai Chang International Multimedia Inc. (TW) - DVD Region 3 - 7 Dics (Ep.1-26)
- April 3, 2014: In a Good Way (DVD) (English Subtitled) (Malaysia Version) (我的自由年代 (DVD) (馬來西亞版)) - Multimedia Entertainment SDN. BHD. - DVD Region 3 - 9 Dics (Ep.1-26)

== Filming locations ==
"In a Good Way" was filmed on the university campuses of "National Central University" located at Jhongli City, Taoyuan County, Taiwan and "National Ilan University" located at Yilan City, Yilan County, Taiwan.

== Broadcast ==
"In a Good Way" first original airing began on Taiwanese Sanlih channel SETTV on November 15, 2013 every Friday night at 10:00 PM. Each episode running time is 105 minutes with commercials and including behind-the-scenes shown at the end of each episodes.

Channel	Country	Airing Date	Timeslot
SETTV	Taiwan	November 15, 2013	Friday 10:00 PM
ETTV	Taiwan	November 16, 2013	Saturday 8:00 PM
NewTV	Thailand	October 14, 2014	Mondays–Wednesdays 11:30 PM–00:30 AM
VTC5	Vietnam	April 18, 2017	Everyday 5:00 PM – 11:00 PM

== Episode ratings ==
"In a Good Way" ratings slowly climbed to the first spot beginning at episode 6 for its time slot, but sank to last place again near the later episodes. The viewers survey was conducted by AGB Nielsen with a survey range of over 4 years old TV audience.

Competing dramas on rival channels airing at the same time slot were:
- CTS - Lovestore at the Corner
- FTV - Justice Heroes, You Light Up My Star
- CTV - Kiss Me Mom!

Air Date	Episode	Average Ratings	Rank
November 15, 2013	1	0.95	3
November 22, 2013	2	1.28	3
November 29, 2013	3	1.31	3
December 6, 2013	4	1.66	2
December 13, 2013	5	1.79	2
December 20, 2013	6	2.39	1
December 27, 2013	7	2.21	1
January 3, 2014	8	2.12	1
January 10, 2014	9	2.25	1
January 17, 2014	10	2.36	1
January 24, 2014	11	2.28	1
January 31, 2014: No episode was aired due to SETTV airing of "Chinese New Year Special"
February 7, 2014	12	2.67	1
February 14, 2014	13	2.50	1
February 21, 2014	14	2.40	1
February 28, 2014	15	2.32	2
March 7, 2014	16	2.36	1
March 14, 2014	17	2.35	1
March 21, 2014	18	2.13	1
March 28, 2014	19	1.96	1
April 4, 2014	20	2.01	1
April 11, 2014	21	1.85	1
April 18, 2014	22	1.85	1
April 25, 2014	23	1.68	1
May 2, 2014	24	1.24	3
May 9, 2014	25	1.46	3
May 16, 2014	26	1.77	1
Average ratings		1.97	

== Awards and nominations ==
Year	Ceremony	Category	Nominee	Result
2014	49th Golden Bell Awards	Best Drama	In a Good Way	Nominated
2014	49th Golden Bell Awards	Best Supporting Actor	Jay Shih	Nominated
2014	49th Golden Bell Awards	Best Lady Killer Award	Jian Chang	Nominated
2014	49th Golden Bell Awards	Best Directing	Wu Meng En	Nominated
2014	49th Golden Bell Awards	Best Screenwriting	Xu Yun Qi & Wu Pei Zhen	Nominated
2014	49th Golden Bell Awards	Best Marketing	In a Good Way	Won
2014	2014 Sanlih Drama Awards 華劇大賞	Best Marketing		
2014	2014 Sanlih Drama Awards 華劇大賞	Best Actor Award	Lego Lee	Nominated
2014	2014 Sanlih Drama Awards 華劇大賞	Best Actor Award	Jay Shih	Nominated
2014	2014 Sanlih Drama Awards 華劇大賞	Best Actress Award	Kirsten Ren	Nominated
2014	2014 Sanlih Drama Awards 華劇大賞	Best Screen Couple Award	Lego Lee & Kirsten Ren	Won
2014	2014 Sanlih Drama Awards 華劇大賞	Best Kiss Award	Lego Lee & Kirsten Ren	Nominated
2014	2014 Sanlih Drama Awards 華劇大賞	Best Crying Award	Lego Lee & Kirsten Ren	Nominated
2014	2014 Sanlih Drama Awards 華劇大賞	Best Lady Killer Award	Liao Jun	Nominated
2014	2014 Sanlih Drama Awards 華劇大賞	Best Foolishly Award	Ma Shi-Li	Nominated
2014	2014 Sanlih Drama Awards 華劇大賞	Viewers Choice Drama Award	In a Good Way	Nominated
