= Aim High (TV series) =

- Promotional poster
- Also known as: 22K Dream Fly High
- 22K夢想高飛
- Genre: Romance; Comedy; Slice of life
- Created by: Sanlih E-Television
- Written by: An Bang 安邦; Wu Xiang En 吳向恩; Lin Yu Chen 林宇辰; Feng Bo Di 馮勃棣
- Directed by: Xu Pei Shan 許珮珊
- Starring: Summer Meng; Chris Wang; Kuo Shu-yao; Lego Lee; Lyan Cheng; Huang Wei Ting
- Opening theme: "Dazzling Dreams 閃亮的夢想" by Vianz 葳安 and Shan 葳萱
- Ending theme: "You're Most Welcome 別客氣" by Soo Wincci
- Country of origin: Taiwan
- Original language: Mandarin
- No. of seasons: 1
- No. of episodes: 20

Production
- Producer: Xie Li Ru 謝禮如
- Production location: Taiwan
- Running time: 90 minutes
- Production companies: Sanlih E-Television; TransWorld Production Co. 映畫傳播事業股份有限公司

Original release
- Network: SETTV
- Release: 24 October 2014 – 13 March 2015

Aim High (Chinese: 22K夢想高飛; pinyin: 22K Meng Xiang Gao Fei) is a 2014 Taiwanese romantic-comedy television series produced by Sanlih E-Television. Starring Summer Meng, Chris Wang, Kuo Shu-yao, and Lego Lee as main leads with Lyan Cheng and Huang Wei Ting as main supporting cast. The original title literally translates to "22K Dream Fly High". 22K was a reference to the median salary for recent college graduates entering the workforce in Taiwan.

Filming began on October 14, 2014, and the drama was filmed as it aired. First original broadcast began October 24, 2014 on SETTV channel, airing every Friday at 10:00-11:30 pm. Original broadcast completed on March 13, 2015, when the last of the 20 episodes aired.

== Synopsis ==
Four friends at the end of their junior year of college dreams of success and landing that perfect job. Each has a detailed perception of what they want to be, however once they graduate from college and enter the workforce reality sets in. All four are struggling by in dead end jobs. Only Xu Yi Fen is still holding on and chasing her dream of being an app developer and creating her own app. Soon hotshot app developer Yu Qi Feng sees potential in her and hires her at his company.

== Plot summary ==
After listening to a lecture speech at her University by hotshot app developer Yu Qi Feng (Chris Wang), junior year student Xu Yi Fen (Summer Meng) is taken to heart by his closing statement to "Live for nothing or die for something". This drives her to become an app developer like Qi Feng. Yi Fen recruits her three best friends Yan Mao Tang nicknamed Mao Mao (Guo Shu Yao), Tian Ming Xian (Lyan Cheng) and Hao Mei (Huang Wei Ting) to help her develop her app "Dream Life" when she decides to enter the Capcom app developer contest.

Each one of her friends have dreams of their own. Stubborn Mao Mao wants to be a flight attendant, free spirit Ming Xian wants to be a poet and righteous Mei wants to be an economist to help the poor. However one year later when all four graduate from college, reality sets in when they enter the work force. Yi Fen is still holding onto her dreams to make her app "Dream Life" happen while struggling to make a living as a beverage delivery person and working as a receptionist at a driving school. Mao Mao is a life insurance salesman who faces pressure from her boss each day to meet her monthly sales quota and fend off perverted clients who sexually harasses while leading her on that they will buy life insurance from her. Ming Xian is a taxi driver but tells her riders that she's really a poet who is a part-time taxi driver. Mei is a teaching assistant for her former professor whom she has a crush on, at the university.

Yi Fen and Qi Feng meet again when he is at the driving school for lessons while she uses the student driver car to chase after her former roommate who swindled her and lied about helping her develop the "Dream Life" app. With encouraging words from Qi Feng at the scene, Yi Fen gains confidence and continues developing her app on her own. The three other friends reunite at their former professor's wedding. They reminisce about how happy they were in college. After realizing Yi Fen not attending the wedding because she has to hand in her app contest presentation, the three are touched that Yi Fen is still following her dreams and decide to go to the contest venue to support her.

Qi Feng who is head of research and development at Capcom Taiwan, has problems of his own when his boss refuses to green light the development of his phone game app while stringing him along that he will reassess the project. Qi Feng spills his frustration about the situation to his friend Ren Dao Yuan (Lego Lee), who is head of the customer service department at Capcom Taiwan. The next day Qi Feng encounters Yi Fen during a beverage delivery run and feels talent being wasted in a menial job, he refers her to Dao Yuan since there is an opening in his department.

Dao Yuan works long hours in a demanding job and lives a lonely life, moved to Taipei from Kaohsiung after graduating from college to search for his former girlfriend Mao Mao, that he lost touch with for six years. The two had tried to maintain a long-distance relationship before losing touch. He was in Kaohsiung during college and she moved to Taipei after her father died. The two had a petty fight about putting time aside for each other and both didn't bother to contact the other back. Thinking Dao Yuan doesn't care, Mao Mao moved and changed her contacts. When Dao Yuan went to Taipei to look for her it was already too late.

== Cast ==
=== Main ===
- Summer Meng as Xu Yi Fen - Age 23

After listening to Yu Qi Feng give a lecture at her college she becomes inspired to be a app developer. However after graduating she struggle through by working as a delivery person and receptionist. After becoming acquainted with Qi Feng, he sees passion and potential in her and gets her hired at Capcom Taiwan.

- Chris Wang as Yu Qi Feng - Age 28

A bigshot app developer who is head of Research and Development at Capcom Taiwan. He gave a lecture speech at Xu Yi Fen's college during her junior year. His words inspires her to create her own app. To everyone he seems to be successful and have it all, but he has career issues of his own because his boss refuses to green light his personal app project.

- Kuo Shu-yao as Yan Mao Tang (Mao Mao) - Age 23

Originally wanting to be a flight attendant, she ends up being a life insurance salesman. Pressure from her boss to make her sale quota cap leads her to desperate measures. She was also Ren Dao Yuan's former girlfriend when he was in college and she was in High School.

- Lego Lee as Ren Dao Yuan - Age 25

Head of the Customer Service department at Capcom Taiwan. Yu Qi Feng's trusted friend at work and outside of work. Yan Mao Tang's former boyfriend who is still in love with her and has been searching for her for six years.

- Lyan Cheng as Tian Ming Xian - Age 23

A free spirit who wanted to be a poet after graduating from college. She works as a taxi driver while still writing poetry on the side. She holds the burden of causing her friends to fail during their senior year because she handed in their team project late.

- Huang Wei Ting as Hao Mei - Age 23

An economics major who wanted to go graduate school to continue her studies so she can become an Economist to help poor people. She works as a teachers assistant for her former professor who she has a crush on. She holds the belief that all business people and politicians are evil.

=== Supporting ===
- Edison Wang as Yu Pin Yao - Age 24

Yu Qi Feng's younger brother. A free spirit, he connects with Tian Ming Xian after riding in her taxi and reading her book of poetry.

- Ray Yang as Lin Ming Hong - Age 25
- Wasir Chou as Hou Pei Xiang - Age 32

The four friends former college professor. Hao Mei works as his teaching assistant and has a crush on him.

- Fu Lei as Yu Rong Fa - Age 57
- Su Yi Jing as Yuan Ruo Wen - Age 56
- Yin Chao De as Xu Shi Tang - Age 55
- Kelly Kuo as Zhong Hui Xin - Age 53
- Lung Shao-hua as Ren Qi Liang - Age 58
- Ke Shu Qin as Feng Si Si - Age 52
- Debbie Yao as Qian Ru Xi - Age 55

Yan Mao Tang's mother. She thinks she is helping her daughter by laying the foundations for her future by purchasing a home and setting her up on blind dates with successful man, but she is really giving more burden to her daughter.

- Lin Hsiu Ling as Tang Shí Fang - Age 54
- Xie Li Jin as Tian Mu Xi - Age 50

=== Guest appearance ===
- Ma Li Ou as CEO Liu

Yu Qi Feng's boss at Capcom Taiwan. He refuses to green light Qi Feng's app project because of the possible financial burden.

- Chen Ching Chieh as Yu Zi

Xu Yi Fen's former roommate who swindled her and lied about helping her create her "Dream Life" app.

- Zoe Li as Zoe

Yu Qi Feng's secretary and personal assistant.

- Zhou Wei Jie as DJ Jas

A DJ that Yan Mao Tang and Ren Dao Yuan listened to and called in when they were dating.

- Maggie Lai as Mao Mao's boss

Mao Mao's demanding boss at the life insurance company. She only cares about sales figures.

- Irene Yang as Hou Pei Xiang wife

Hao Mei is disappointed when she hears her former professor is marrying her, a business women.

== Soundtrack ==
Aim High Original TV Soundtrack (OST)

Soundtrack album by Various artists
- Released: 30 January 2015
- Genre: Mandopop
- Language: Mandarin
- Label: Avex Taiwan Inc.

Aim High Original TV Soundtrack (OST) (22K夢想高飛 電視原聲帶) was released on January 30, 2015, by various artists under Avex Taiwan Inc. record label. It contains 16 tracks total, in which 8 songs are various instrumental versions of the songs. The opening theme is track 1 "Dazzling Dreams 閃亮的夢想" by Vianz and Shan, while the closing theme is track 8 "You're Most Welcome 別客氣" by Soo Wincci.

=== Track listing ===
| No. | Title | Singer(s) | Length |
|---|---|---|---|
| 1. | "Dazzling Dreams" (閃亮的夢想) | Vianz 葳安 & Shan 葳萱 | 3:22 |
| 2. | "Endless Happiness" (幸福滿滿) | Soo Wincci 蘇盈之 ft. Daniel Chan 陳曉東 | 2:58 |
| 3. | "Missing You All The Time" | Vianz 葳安 & Shan 葳萱 | 3:52 |
| 4. | "Kiss Temperature" (吻的溫度) | Fuying & Sam | 4:02 |
| 5. | "Looking For Trouble" (找麻煩) | Soo Wincci 蘇盈之 | 4:46 |
| 6. | "Hide" (藏不住) | BY2 ft. MP魔幻力量廷廷 | 3:51 |
| 7. | "Like Me" (Like我一下) | Fuying & Sam | 3:35 |
| 8. | "You're Most Welcome" (別客氣) | Soo Wincci 蘇盈之 | 3:43 |
| 9. | "Dazzling Dreams (Alongside ver.)" (閃亮的夢想 (並肩作戰版)) | Instrumental | 3:13 |
| 10. | "You're Most Welcome (Mutual Warmth ver.)" (別客氣 (互相取暖版)) | Instrumental | 3:18 |
| 11. | "Kiss Temperature (Life Flavor ver.)" (吻的溫度 (生活調味版)) | Instrumental | 3:04 |
| 12. | "Endless Happiness (Proud Love ver.)" (幸福滿滿 (愛情事業兩得意版)) | Instrumental | 3:29 |
| 13. | "You're Most Welcome (Feelings Declared ver.)" (別客氣 (情緒宣洩版)) | Instrumental | 3:54 |
| 14. | "Dazzling Dreams (Brave Dream ver.)" (閃亮的夢想 (勇敢追夢版)) | Instrumental | 3:08 |
| 15. | "Looking For Trouble (Mood ver.)" (找麻煩 (心情沉澱版)) | Instrumental | 3:01 |
| 16. | "Missing You All The Time (Smile Missing ver.)" | Instrumental | 3:10 |

Songs not featured on the official soundtrack album.

- Who Stole Your Happiness 誰偷了你的快樂 by Ryan Ding 丁衣凡
- I Want You by Dom.T

== Publications ==
Aim High Original Novel (22K夢想高飛電視原創小說)
- Book cover image
- Author: Sanlih E-Television 三立電視監製; Li Yan Cheng 李炎澄
- Genre: Fiction novel
- Published: 8 January 2015
- Publication place: Taiwan
- Media type: Print paperback
- Pages: 296
- ISBN: 9789865922603

* 8 January 2015 : Aim High Original Novel (22K夢想高飛電視原創小說) - ISBN 9789865922603 - Author: Sanlih E-Television 三立電視監製 & Li Yan Cheng 李炎澄 - Publisher: Spring Press 春光出版社

A novel based on the drama was published detailing the entire story line of the drama and brief description of each main character. Spoilers are revealed in the novel before the drama finished airing.

* 3 December 2014 : S-Pop Vol. 23 December 2014 (華流 12月號/2014) - barcode 4717095578630 - Author: Sanlih E-Television 三立電視監製

Both leading male of the drama, Chris Wang and Lego Lee are featured on the cover of the December 2014 issue of Sanlih's self published S-Pop magazine. The issue can be purchased in regular edition or special edition with a insert pictorial booklet with 77 different Taiwanese artists in flower themed images.

* 28 November 2014 : Iwalker No.06 Dec 2014/Jan 2015 (愛玩客 第6期/2014-2015) - barcode 4717095572690 - Author: Sanlih E-Television 三立電視監製

The December 2014/January 2015 issue of Iwalker magazine features male leads Lego Lee and Chris Wang on separate covers. A total of three covers were published, with Lee on one cover and Wang on another.

* 3 February 2015 : S-Pop Vol. 25 February 2015 (華流 2月號/2015) - barcode 4717095588332 - Author: Sanlih E-Television 三立電視監製

One out of five covers of the February 2015 issue of S-Pop magazine features second lead couple Lego Lee and Guo Shu Yao on the cover. The issue they are featured in is the special issue edition which comes with a gift of a DIY card broad stationery holder.

== DVD release ==
* 8 May 2015 : Aim High (DVD) (Taiwan Version) - DVD Region 3 - Disc: 5 (Ep.1-20) - Publisher: Cai Chang International Multimedia Inc. (TW)

Official Taiwan version of the drama DVD set comes in original Mandarin language and Chinese subtitles only.

* 4 May 2015 : Aim High (DVD) (Malaysia Version) - DVD All Region - Disc: 7 (Ep.1-20) - Publisher: Multimedia Entertainment SDN. BHD. (MLY)

Malaysia version of the drama DVD set comes in original Mandarin language with English and simplified Chinese subtitles.

== Filming locations ==
The opening sequence of the drama was filmed at the "White House Resort" located in Wanli District, New Taipei, Taiwan. The building and the lobby depicted in the drama as Capcom Taiwan headquarters is a newly built commercial building located at the corner of Minshan Street and Xinhu 1st Road in the Neihu District of Taipei, while the real headquarters of Capcom Taiwan is located at Sec.1, Dunhua South Road in Daan District, Taipei.

=== Taipei, Taiwan ===
- Daan District
  - Da Bar
- Nangang District
  - Taipei Nangang exhibition center station
  - Songshan District
  - Taipei Songshan Airport
- Xizhi District
  - Kuan He Restaurant 寬和宴展館
- Zhongshan District
  - Hua Nan Drive 華南駕訓練班
  - Shih Chien University 實踐大學

=== New Taipei City, Taiwan ===
- Sanzhi District
  - Eighteen Kids House 18個孩子民宿
- Tamsui District
  - Ya Dear Restaurant 雅帝皇家經典美食
- Wanli District
  - White House Resort 白宮行舘海灘度假村

=== Taoyuan County, Taiwan ===
- Zhongli City
  - Yuan Ze University 元智大學

== Development and casting ==
- Original title of the drama during post-production was "22K Small Fortunately 22K的小確幸".
- Both Lego Lee and Chris Wang was announced on July 30, 2014, to be headlining an upcoming SETTV drama together.
- Sanlih held a press conference on July 31, 2014, showcasing their four main in-house contractual lead actors (Lego Lee, Chris Wang, George Hu and Lin Yo Wei) and announcing the upcoming dramas for the later half of 2014 schedule lineup.
- The four main actresses of the drama Summer Meng, Guo Shu Yao, Lyan Cheng and Huang Wei-Ting was introduced at a press conference on September 22, 2014, at Sanlih's headquarters rooftop garden.
- The opening lens and blessing ceremony was held at SETTV headquarters main entrance on October 13, 2014.
- On October 23, 2014, another press conference was held at SETTV headquarters auditorium introducing the extended cast of the drama.

== Broadcast ==
| Network | Country | Airing Date | Timeslot |
|---|---|---|---|
| SETTV | Taiwan | October 24, 2014 | Friday 10:00-11:30 pm |
| ETTV | Taiwan | October 25, 2014 | Saturday 8:00-9:30 pm |
| E City | Singapore | November 23, 2014 | Sunday 10:00-11:30 pm |
| TVB Chinese Drama | Hong Kong | April 5, 2015 | Sunday 11:00 am–12:55 pm |
| Astro Shuang Xing | Malaysia | April 30, 2015 | Sunday - Thursday 4:00-5:00 pm |
| True Asian Series | Thailand | August 9, 2015 | Saturday - Sunday 7:00-8:00 pm |

== Episode ratings ==
Competing dramas on rival channels airing at the same time slot were:

- TTV - Apple in Your Eye, Mr. Right Wanted, The New World
- SET - Our Mother, Life Of Pearl
- FTV - Independent Heroes

| Air Date | Episode | Average Ratings | Rank |
|---|---|---|---|
| October 24, 2014 | 1 | 1.08 | 4 |
| October 31, 2014 | 2 | 0.83 | 4 |
| November 7, 2014 | 3 | 0.90 | 3 |
| November 14, 2014 | 4 | 1.03 | 3 |
| November 21, 2014 | 5 | 0.90 | 3 |
| November 28, 2014 | 6 | 0.92 | 4 |
| December 5, 2014 | 7 | 0.99 | 3 |
| December 12, 2014 | 8 | 0.92 | 3 |
| December 19, 2014 | 9 | 1.05 | 3 |
| December 26, 2014 | 10 | 0.95 | 3 |
| January 2, 2015 | 11 | 0.98 | 3 |
| January 9, 2015 | 12 | 0.96 | 3 |
| January 16, 2015 | 13 | 0.90 | 3 |
| January 23, 2015 | 14 | 0.85 | 3 |
| January 30, 2015 | 15 | 0.83 | 3 |
| February 6, 2015 | 16 | 0.82 | 3 |
| February 13, 2015 | 17 | -- | -- |
February 20, 2015: No episode was broadcast due to airing of Chinese New Year Specials
| February 27, 2015 | 18 | 0.95 | 3 |
| March 6, 2015 | 19 | 0.93 | 3 |
| March 13, 2015 | 20 | 1.24 | 2 |
| Average ratings | | 0.90 | |

== Awards and nominations ==
| Year | Ceremony | Category | Nominee | Result |
|---|---|---|---|---|
| 2014 | 2014 Sanlih Drama Awards 華劇大賞 | Best Actor Award | Chris Wang | Nominated |
| 2014 | 2014 Sanlih Drama Awards 華劇大賞 | Best Actor Award | Lego Lee | Nominated |
| 2014 | 2014 Sanlih Drama Awards 華劇大賞 | Best Actress Award | Summer Meng | Nominated |
| 2014 | 2014 Sanlih Drama Awards 華劇大賞 | Best Actress Award | Guo Shu Yao | Won |
| 2014 | 2014 Sanlih Drama Awards 華劇大賞 | Best Screen Couple Award | Lego Lee & Guo Shu Yao | Nominated |
| 2014 | 2014 Sanlih Drama Awards 華劇大賞 | China Wave Award | Chris Wang | Nominated |
| 2014 | 2014 Sanlih Drama Awards 華劇大賞 | China Wave Award | Lego Lee | Nominated |
| 2014 | 2014 Sanlih Drama Awards 華劇大賞 | China Wave Award | Guo Shu Yao | Nominated |
| 2014 | 2014 Sanlih Drama Awards 華劇大賞 | Weibo Popularity Award | Chris Wang | Nominated |
| 2014 | 2014 Sanlih Drama Awards 華劇大賞 | Weibo Popularity Award | Lego Lee | Nominated |
| 2014 | 2014 Sanlih Drama Awards 華劇大賞 | Weibo Popularity Award | Guo Shu Yao | Nominated |
| 2014 | 2014 Sanlih Drama Awards 華劇大賞 | Viewers Choice Drama Award | Aim High | Nominated |
