= Jay Shih =

Taiwanese actor and singer (born 1983)

- Born: 31 October 1983 (age 42); Yonghe City, Taipei County, Taiwan (now Yonghe District, New Taipei City, Taiwan)
- Education: Jinwen University of Science and Technology
- Occupations: Actor, singer, television host
- Years active: 2002—present

Chinese name
- Chinese: 是元介
Transcriptions
Standard Mandarin
- Hanyu Pinyin: Shì Yuánjiè
Southern Min
- Hokkien POJ: Sī Goân-kài

Paiwan name
- Paiwan: Makazayazaya Maicus
- Musical career
- Also known as: Shih Yuan-chieh; Shi Yuanjie
- Genres: Mandopop
- Instruments: Vocals, guitar
- Formerly of: Awaking

Makazayazaya Maicus (Paiwan pronunciation: [makazajaˈzaja maˈit͡sus]), known professionally as Jay Shih (Chinese: 是元介; Pe̍h-ōe-jī: Sī Goân-kài; born 31 October 1983) is a Taiwanese actor, singer and television host of Paiwan descent. He debuted as one half of the Mandopop duo Awaking, with the other being Wesley Chia. As an actor, he has appeared in television series including Miss No Good (2008), Summer Fever (2012) and Love Cheque Charge (2014), and is best known for portraying Cheng Jen-wei in the SET series In a Good Way (2013).

On 5 July 2024, Jay changed his name into the Paiwan name Makazayazaya Maicus.

== Filmography ==
=== Television series ===
Year	English title	Mandarin title	Role	Notes
2006	The Journey of Life	人生旅程-緣	Tseng Yuan-to	
2008	Miss No Good	不良笑花	Tou-tzu	
2008	Draw	想畫	Hsiao Feng	
2010	Gloomy Salad Days	死神少女	Lee Chiang	Episode 11–12
2010	Hero Daddy	帶子英雄	A-lieh	
2010	Utopia Office	烏托邦辦公室	Zhu Ming	Web series
2011	Next Heroes	真的漢子	Kuan Chung	
2011	Story 33	33故事館	Wu Chun-tsai	Episode 11
2011	Life Is Not a Fairytale	仙女不下凡	Yeh Chih-jen	
2011	Material Queen	拜金女王	Chia-hao	Episode 17
2012	Summer Fever	戀夏38°C	Huang Chih-chung	
2012	Loves in Penghu	陽光正藍	Lee Yi-ming	
2012	Xun Zhao Xing Fu De Zhong Zi	尋找幸福的種子	Kuo-chi	
2013	A Hint of You	美味的想念	Sun Tien-hao	
2013	The Late Night Stop	小站	A-chien	Episode 30
2013	In a Good Way	我的自由年代	Cheng Jen-wei	
2014	Hometown	原鄉	Hung Hsiao-hsiung	
2014	Teacher Gangstar	神仙老師狗	Chuang Yueh-han	
2014	Love Cheque Charge	幸福兌換券	Wang Po-hao	
2015	Tricky Case	詭案	Niu Changlong	Web series
2016	Thirty Something	我的30定律	Lawyer Lan	Guest cast
2016	Do You Know That I Love You	我喜歡你，你知道嗎?	Wen Hongsi / Wen Yubin	Web series
2017	Happy Valentine's Day	我的狐仙老婆	Lan He	Web series

=== Film ===
Year	English title	Original title	Role	Notes
2002	Blue Gate Crossing	藍色大門	Pipi	Cameo
2006	Brotherhood of Legion	神選者	Mysterios envoy	
2007	Spider Lilies	刺青	A-tung	
2007	Shopping Cart Boy	購物車男孩	Store worker	Short film
2014	Happiness Amulet	幸福御守	Jay	Short film
2016	The Return	回魂	Yu Ming	Television
2016	Never Give Up	不離不棄	Hu Bozhong	
2017	Turn Around	老師，你會不會回來？	Wang Cheng-chung	
2018	Ching's Way Homes	阿青,回家了	Yang Chun	Television
2019	Killer Not Stupid	殺手不笨	Hornet	
2019	Hello Tapir			

=== Variety show ===
Year	English title	Mandarin title	Notes
2003	Azio Music	東風音樂通	Host
2013	The Grand Voyage	放膽去旅行	Episode 2; host
2015–2016	Wish Me Luck	為我加油	Host

== Discography ==
=== Singles ===
Year	Title	Notes
2014	"Hold 不放"	
2017	"Love Daydream 戀愛白日夢"	
2018	"Old 偕老"	

=== Compilation album ===
Year	Title	Notes
1998	Excellent (一級棒)	

== Published works ==
- Shih, Jay (2003). Xi Ha Wan Sui Quan Tai Jie Wu Da Zhui Zong. Taipei: Ru He. ISBN 9576078717.

== Awards and nominations ==
Year	Award	Category	Nominated work	Result
2009	44th Golden Bell Awards	Best Supporting Actor in a Miniseries or Television Film	Draw	Nominated
2014	49th Golden Bell Awards	Best Supporting Actor in a Television Series	In a Good Way	Nominated
2018	53rd Golden Bell Awards	Best Supporting Actor in a Miniseries or Television Film	Ching's Way Homes	Nominated
