= The Teenage Psychic =

2017 Taiwanese television series

- Promotional poster
- Traditional Chinese: 通靈少女
- Hanyu Pinyin: Tōng Líng Shàonǚ
- Genre: Supernatural; Drama; Romance
- Written by: Chen He Yu; Liao Zhen Kai; Li Ting Yu; Lin Meng Huan
- Directed by: Chen He Yu
- Starring: Kuo Shu-yao; Kent Tsai; Akio Chen
- Ending theme: "Untitled Daily" 無題日常 by Mu Liang Zhen Zhen
- Composers: Wen Zi Jie, Yang Wan Qian
- Country of origin: Taiwan
- Original languages: Mandarin; Taiwanese Hokkien
- No. of episodes: 6

Production
- Executive producers: Jonathan Spink (HBO Asia); Erika North; Shi Yue Wen (PTS); Francis Smith (IFA Media)
- Producers: Chen Wei Ru, Liu Yu Xuan
- Production locations: Beitou District, Shilin District, Taipei, Taiwan; Xizhi District, New Taipei City, Taiwan
- Cinematography: Chen Ke Qin
- Editor: Lin Kai En
- Running time: 50 minutes
- Production company: Infocus Asia PTE. LTD. (IFA Media)

Original release
- Network: PTS; HBO Asia; RED by HBO
- Release: April 2 – April 30, 2017

Related
- The Teenage Psychic 2

The Teenage Psychic (Chinese: 通靈少女; pinyin: Tōng Líng Shàonǚ; Pe̍h-ōe-jī: thong-lêng siàu-lí) is a 2017 Taiwanese television miniseries. It is an adaptation of Chen He Yu's 2013 short film The Busy Young Psychic (神算). It stars Kuo Shu-yao, Kent Tsai, Akio Chen, Alina Zheng and Sylvia Hsieh. Filming began on July 19, 2016. First original broadcast began on April 2, 2017, on PTS.

== Synopsis ==
Xie Ya Zhen is a high school student who is born with psychic abilities. At night, she works at the temple as a Xian-gu (仙姑) to help believers.

== Cast ==
=== Main cast ===
- Kuo Shu-yao as Xie Ya Zhen
- Kent Tsai as He Yun Le
- Akio Chen as Jin Sheng Zai
- Alina Cheng as Huang Qiao Wei
- Sylvia Hsieh as Zhang Nian Wen

=== Supporting cast ===
- Tiger Wang as Huang Xin Ren
- Da-her Lin as Birdy
- Hong Qun-jun as Hong Jun Bao
- Xiang Cheng-yu as Chen Meng Da
- Zhang Wei as Zhang Wei
- Lin Si-ting as Lin Si Ting
- Ye Zi-yan as Teacher Zhu
- Li Ying-hong as Ah Hong
- Wu Hong-xiu as Ah Xiu

== Soundtrack ==
- Untitled Daily 無題日常 by Mu Liang Zhen Zhen
- Never Come Back 不曾回來過 by Lee Chien-na

== Awards and nominations ==
Award ceremony	Category	Recipients	Result
52nd Golden Bell Awards	Best Miniseries	The Teenage Psychic	Won
52nd Golden Bell Awards	Best Leading Actress in a Miniseries or Television Film	Kuo Shu-yao	Nominated
52nd Golden Bell Awards	Best Supporting Actress in a Miniseries or Television Film	Lee Chien-na	Won
52nd Golden Bell Awards	Best Newcomer in a Miniseries or Television Film	Kent Tsai	Nominated
52nd Golden Bell Awards	Best Directing for a Miniseries or Television Film	Chen Ho-yu	Nominated
52nd Golden Bell Awards	Best Writing for a Miniseries or Television Film	Lee Ting-yu, Chen Ho-yu, Lin Meng-huan, Liao Zhen-kai	Nominated
