= Turn Around (film) =

- Theatrical release poster
- Chinese: 老師你會不會回來
- Literal meaning: Teacher, Will You Be Back?
- Hanyu Pinyin: Lǎo Shī Nǐ Huì Bù Huì Huí Lái
- Directed by: Chen Ta-pu
- Screenplay by: Cheng Yang-shan
- Based on: Turn Around by Wang Cheng-chung
- Produced by: Kuo Mu-sheng
- Starring: Jay Shih; Kimi Hsia
- Production companies: Fashion Media mm2 Entertainment
- Release date: September 29, 2017
- Running time: 108 minutes
- Country: Taiwan
- Language: Mandarin
- Budget: NT$70 million
- Box office: NT$38,600,000 (Taiwan)

Turn Around is a 2017 Taiwanese drama film directed by Chen Ta-pu. The plot is loosely based on the true story of Wang Cheng-chung, a passionate teacher who has won multiple educational awards in Taiwan. After the 921 earthquake in 1999, Wang makes the decision to teach at a countryside school which was hit by the earthquake. Employing a creative teaching method, he is determined to reverse the perception of rural education in Taiwan. The film stars Jay Shih and Kimi Hsia.

== Premise ==
After graduating from the National Kaohsiung Normal University, Wang Cheng-chung is assigned to teach at a school located at the rural Zhongliao in Nantou County, which is lacking in educational resources. As he is preparing for his leave at the end of his internship, he is met with the deadly 921 earthquake. Seeing the students breaking down in tears and asking for his return, Wang decides to stay with the school to improve the education of the students.

== Cast ==
- Jay Shih as Wang Cheng-chung
- Kimi Hsia as Ms. Hsiao-lun
- Chao Shu-hai as Principal
- Lu Yi-ching as Shu-fen
- Ying Wei-min as Mr. Chiu
- Chang Chiung-tzu as Wang Cheng-chung's mother
- Alice Chi as Wang Cheng-chung's sister
- Chien Chang as Temple host
- Su Pin-chieh as Ta-tzu
- Shih Kang-chun as A-biao
- Yuan Jen-fu as A-fei
- Cindy Chi as Class monitress
- Chiu Chia-hsin as Yen-tao
