= EBC News =

Television channel of Taiwan

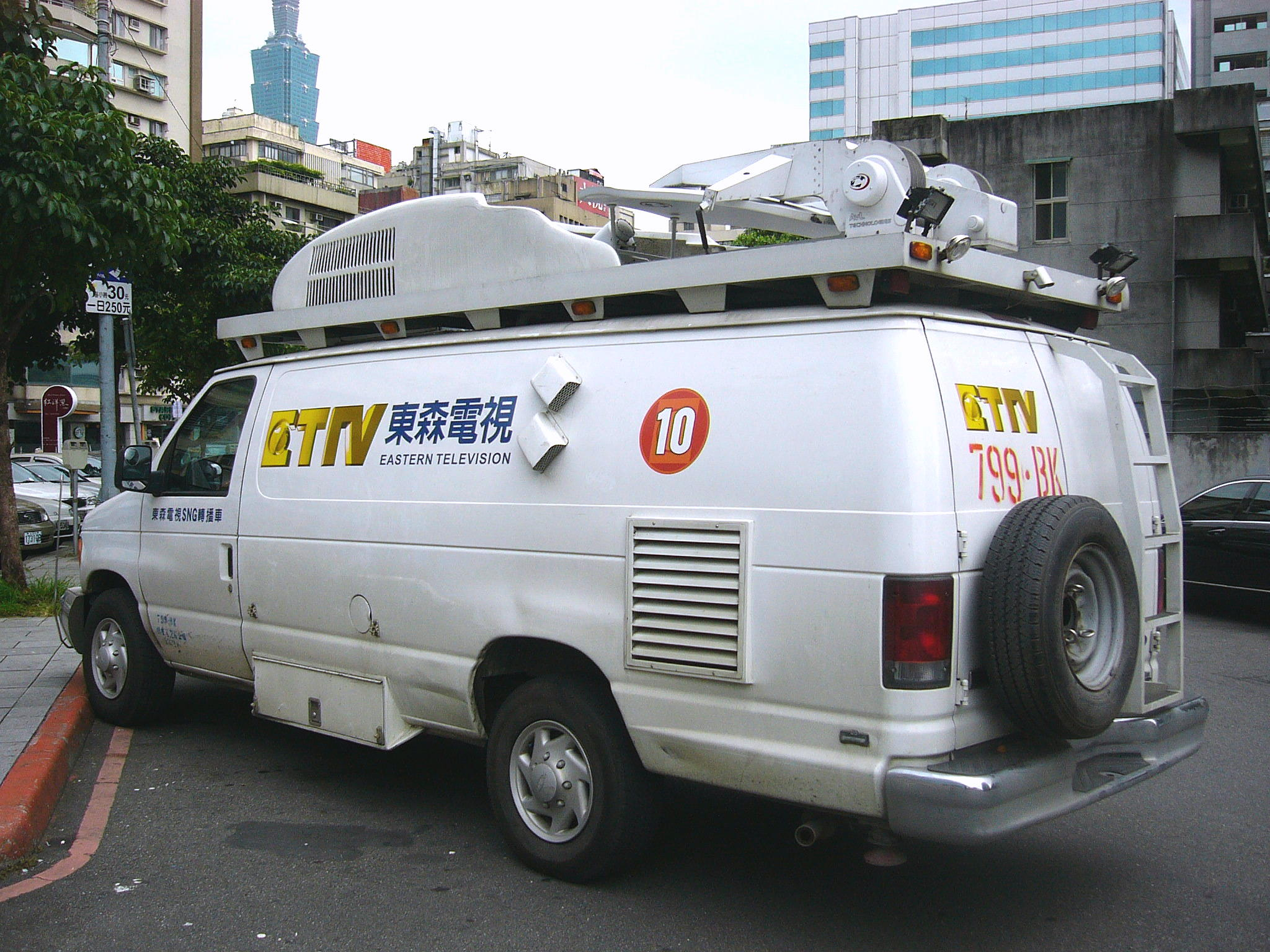
- Country: Taiwan
- Broadcast area: Worldwide
- Network: Eastern Television
- Headquarters: Taipei, Taiwan

Ownership
- Sister channels: ETtoday

History
- Launched: 1 September 1997; 28 years ago
- Former names: ETTV News

Links
- Website: http://news.ebc.net.tw/

EBC News (Chinese: 東森新聞台) is a satellite cable news channel operated by Eastern Television in Taiwan. It was a free-to-air studios television launched on 1 September 1997. It also broadcasts content from BBC News.

== ETTV Asia News ==
ETTV Asia News
- Country: Taiwan
- Broadcast area: Hong Kong; Singapore
- Network: Eastern Television
- Headquarters: Taipei, Taiwan

Ownership
- Sister channels: ETtoday

History
- Launched: 2002

Links
- Website: http://ettvasia.ebc.net.tw/

ETTV Asia News (Chinese: 東森亞洲新聞台; pinyin: Dōngsēn yazhou xīnwén tái) is a satellite cable news channel operated by Eastern Television in Southeast Asia. It was a free-to-air studios television launched on 2002.

EBC Asia News is 24-hour all-news channel, which they did aired the news (including the news bulletins re-aired during the overnight) but doesn't carried some of the news footage outside Taiwan (such as news from Japanese sources or even, in some cases, live sporting events which they only handled the broadcast for the Taiwanese cable TV).

=== Controversies ===
In April 2023, two EBC News reporters were taken into Chinese custody after filming military drills by the Chinese People's Liberation Army on Pingtan Island.

== ETTV News America ==
ETTV News America
- Country: Taiwan
- Broadcast area: North America
- Network: Eastern Television
- Headquarters: Taipei, Taiwan

Ownership
- Sister channels: ETtoday

History
- Launched: 2003

Links
- Website: http://www.ettvamerica.com

ETTV News America (Chinese: 東森美洲新聞台; pinyin: Tung-Sen Mei-Chou Hsīn-Wén-Tái) is a satellite cable news channel operated by Eastern Television in North America. It was a free-to-air studios television launched in April 2003.
