= Hsieh Hsin-ying =

Taiwanese actress

Nikki Hsieh
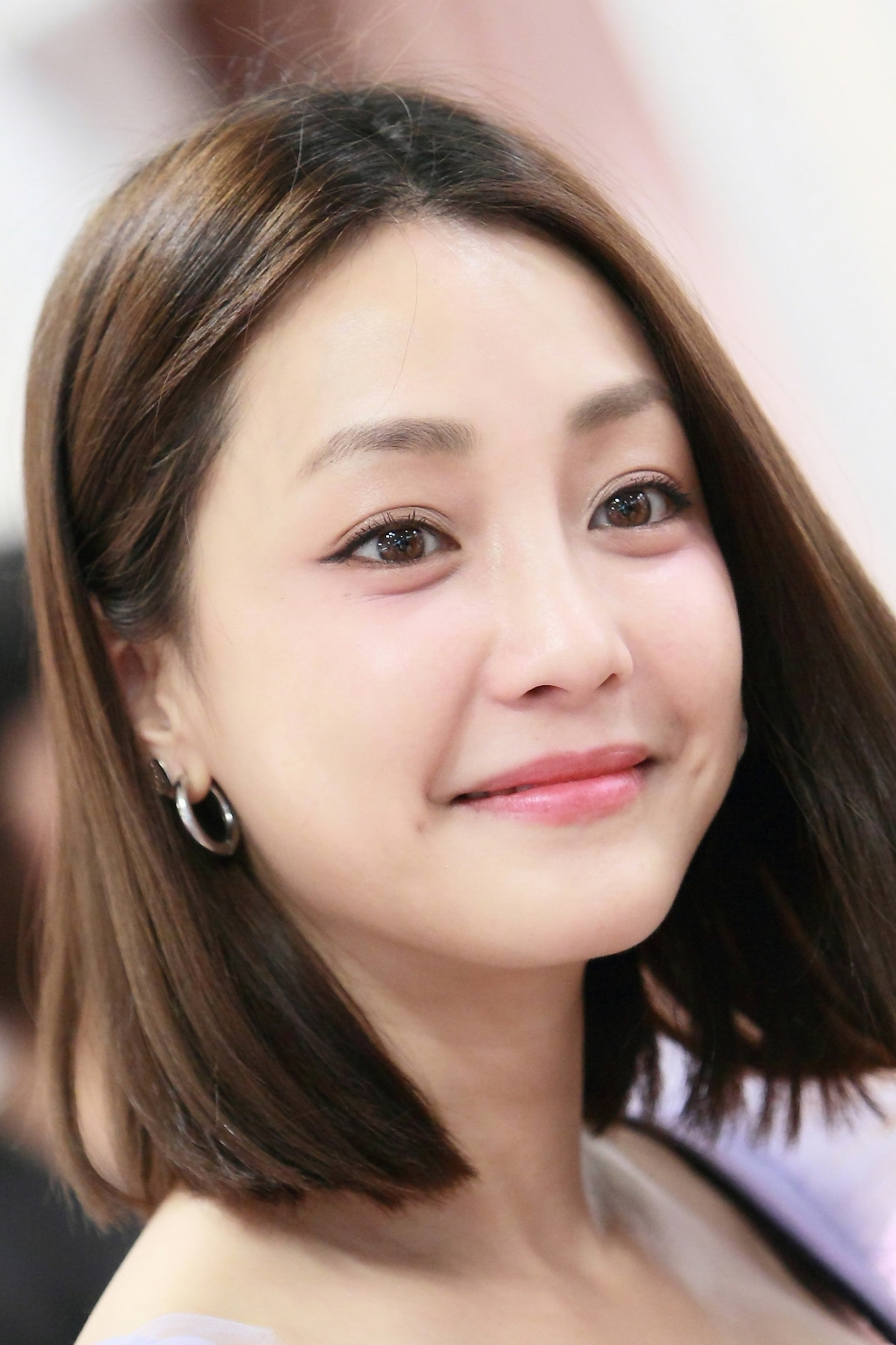
- Hsieh in 2016
- Born: May 1, 1985 (age 41); Taiwan
- Education: DaoJiang High School of Nursing & Home Economics
- Occupations: Actress; model
- Years active: 2003–present

Chinese name
- Traditional Chinese: 謝欣穎
- Simplified Chinese: 谢欣颖
- Hanyu Pinyin: Xiè Xīnyǐng
- Wade–Giles: Hsieh Hsin-ying

Hsieh Hsin-ying (Chinese: 謝欣穎; pinyin: Xiè Xīnyǐng; born May 1, 1985), also known as Nikki Hsieh is a Taiwanese actress and model. Her works have expanded in different realms, including advertising, movies, and TV series. She appeared in the movies including Make Up, I WeirDo, and The Assassin. As for television, she appeared in Light the Night, Love @ Seventeen, and Meet Me @ 1006. In 2006, she participated in Reflections and won the 43rd Golden Horse Award for the Best Supporting Actress.

== Early life ==
Since childhood, her parents have always told her that she needs to rely on herself for a better life, as a result, she has been working hard to support herself. In order to have a steady source of income, Hsieh decided to drop out of school and started a modeling career at her eleventh grade.

== Career ==
While attending middle school, Hsieh worked in a small Japanese shop in Gongguan commercial district, and a self-proclaimed star agent approached her to join the modeling industry. The turning point to make Hsieh become an actress is when she got acquainted with the director Hou Hsiao-hsien when filming the advertisement キリンビバレッジ 聞茶 (Janpan KIRIN 聞茶) in 2001. Hsieh's first film My Whispering Plan was cast by the director Chu Yu-ning in 2002. In 2006, she participated in the movie Reflections and won the Best Supporting Female Actor Award at the 43rd Golden Horse Award.

In 2010, Hsieh participated in the movies Honey Pupu and Make Up. These two movies won her the Best Female Actor at the 13th Taipei Film Festival. Besides, the movie Make Up also won her the Best Female Actor at the 10th Far East Film Festival. In 2012, Hsieh joined in the TV show Die Sterntaler which adapted from the classic Japanese drama Die Sterntaler. As a female leading actor, Hsieh was nominated for Best Actor at the 48th Golden Bell Award.

In 2015, she starred in the swordsmen film The Assassin directed by Hou Hsiao-hsien and was selected by Festival De Cannes. In 2019, Hsieh participated in Til Death Do Us Part as a supporting actress, and she was nominated for the 55th Golden Bell Awards for the Mini-Series/TV Movie Supporting Actress Award. In 2020, the movie I WeirDo featured Hsieh in the lead role, the first Asian movie filmed with the iPhone. Due to this movie, she was nominated at the 57th Golden Horse Award and 23rd Taipei Film Festival for Best Female Actor. In the TV Show Light the Night aired on Netflix in 2021, Hsieh played the supporting role called Yuli, a seemingly quiet and mysterious hostess working in a popular Japanese night club located in the red light district in 1980s Taipei.

== Charity ==
With her care for children, Hsieh is a contributor to the World Vision in Taiwan and acts as the ambassador of World Vision Taiwan in 2023, calling on enriching children's diet by meal coupon subscription. Furthermore, she serves as the public welfare ambassador of the Down Syndrome Foundation to promote their right to work.

== Acting credits and awards ==
In 2006, Hsieh participated in Reflections and won the 43rd Golden Horse Award for Best Supporting Actress for this performance. In 2011, she won the Best Actress Award at the 13th Taipei Film Festival for her performances in Make Up and HONEY PUPU. In 2013, she was shortlisted for the 48th Golden Bell Awards for Actress in Drama Program for her performance in the TV series Die Sterntaler. In 2020, she was shortlisted for the 55th Golden Bell Awards Mini Series TV Movie Supporting Actress Award for her performance in Til Death Do Us Part. In the same year, she was also shortlisted for the Best Actress Award at the 57th Golden Horse Awards and the Best Actress Award at the 23rd Taipei Film Awards for her performance in I WeirDo.
