= Awaking (duo) =

- Born: Taiwan
- Years active: 2004–2008

Chinese name
- Traditional Chinese: 元衛覺醒
Transcriptions
Standard Mandarin
- Hanyu Pinyin: Yuán Wèi Jué Xǐng
- Musical career
- Also known as: Yuan Wei Jue Xing
- Origin: Taiwan
- Genres: Mandarin pop
- Labels: Avex Taiwan (2004-2007); Gold Typhoon (2007-2008)
- Past members: Jay Shih; Wesley Chia

Awaking was a Taiwanese pop music duo, formed by Jay Shih and Wesley Chia. They released their self-titled debut album in 2004, and the first single from the album, "Dream", became a modest hit in Taiwan. The song was subsequently covered by Vivian Hsu on her album The Secret to Happiness Is Love.

In 2006, the pair was nominated for Best Vocal Collaboration at the 17th Golden Melody Awards for the album Happiness Download.

== Discography ==
=== Studio albums ===
| Title | Album details | Track listing |
|---|---|---|
| Awaking 元衛覺醒 | Released: May 27, 2004; Label: Avex Taiwan; Formats: CD, digital download | Track listing: 1. Dream; 2. 靠近; 3. 短訊; 4. Intro牛仔; 5. 牛仔; 6. 小時候; 7. 過期; 8. 親愛的朋友; 9. 鬥魚; 10. Let It Go; 11. 明星搖滾夢 |
| Happiness Download 幸福下載 | Released: July 1, 2005; Label: Avex Taiwan; Formats: CD, digital download | Track listing: 1. 幸福下載; 2. 比基尼; 3. 夏天的風; 4. 新聞主播; 5. 你好嗎; 6. 王老五; 7. 大哥大; 8. 備份; 9. 天空; 10. 環遊世界 |
| No Money! Still Be Happy! 下流社會 | Released: December 21, 2007; Label: Gold Typhoon; Formats: CD, digital download | Track listing: 1. Awaking Murmur 笑掉江湖; 2. No Money! Still Be Happy! 下流社會; 3. Break-Up Gift 分手禮; 4. Ostrich 鴕鳥; 5. Life Sucks 機車人生; 6. Lady's Night 給我一槍; 7. Childish 像個小孩; 8. Rainbow Girl 虹彩她妹妹; 9. The Moment 只要一秒在一起; 10. Joyful Journey 梧桐 |

== Awards and nominations ==
| Year | Award | Category | Nominated work | Result |
|---|---|---|---|---|
| 2005 | 12th Chinese Music Awards | Top Ten Hits | "Summer Wind" | Won |
| 2006 | 17th Golden Melody Awards | Best Vocal Collaboration | Happiness Download | Nominated |
