= Huang Yee-ling =

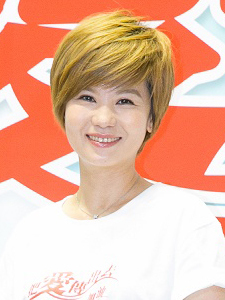
- Huang at a fundraising event for the 2014 Kaohsiung gas explosions
- Born: Huang Ming-chu (黃明珠); 20 September 1969 (age 56); Wanli, Taipei County, Taiwan
- Occupation: Singer
- Years active: 1987–present
- Children: 1
- Awards: Golden Melody Awards – Best Female Hokkien singer 1999, 2006, 2009, 2014

Chinese name
- Traditional Chinese: 黃乙玲
- Simplified Chinese: 黄乙玲
Transcriptions
Standard Mandarin
- Hanyu Pinyin: Huáng Yǐlíng
- Musical career
- Genres: Hokkien pop, Buddhist music, J-pop

Huang Yee-ling (born Huang Ming-chu on 20 September 1969) is a Taiwanese Hokkien pop singer. She has released 32 Hokkien pop albums since 1987, and 3 Japanese albums between 1988 and 1990.

She won Golden Melody Award for Best Female Hokkien singer a record 4 times (tied with Jody Chiang), in 1999 (10th), 2006 (17th), 2009 (20th), and 2014 (25th).
