= Eastern Broadcasting Company =

Taiwanese media company

Eastern Broadcasting Company 東森電視有限公司
- Type: Nationwide cable television network
- Branding: EBC
- Country: Taiwan
- First air date: August 1995
- Availability: Taiwan; Hong Kong, Mainland China; Singapore; Philippines
- Area: Taipei, Taiwan
- Former names: Eastern Television (1995-2015)
- Official website: www.ebc.net.tw

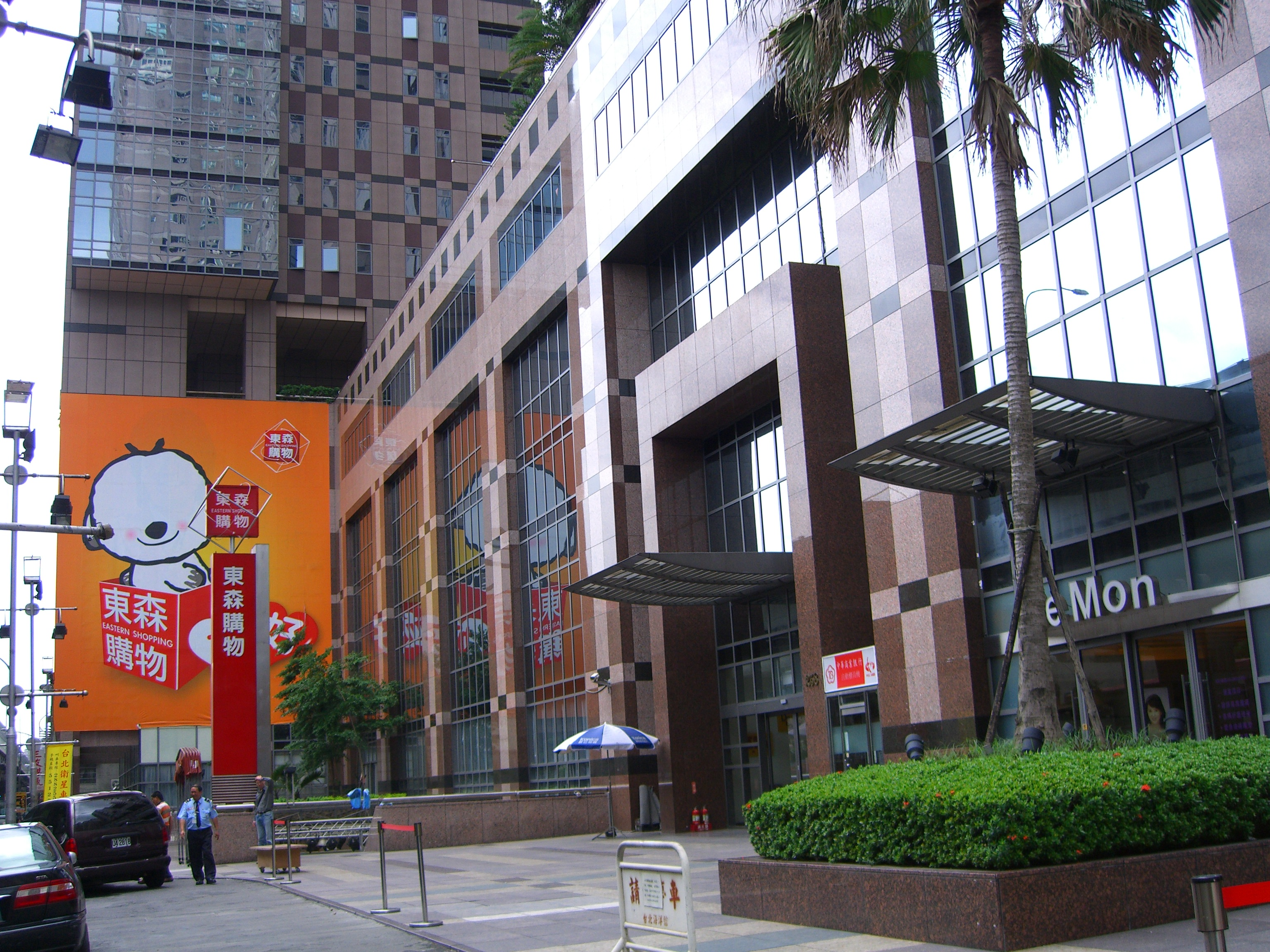
The building of ETTV Shopping in Zhonghe District, New Taipei City

Eastern Broadcasting Company (EBC; Chinese: 東森電視; pinyin: Dōngsēn Diànshì), originally called Eastern Television (ETTV), is a nationwide cable television network in Taiwan that is operated by the Eastern Broadcasting Group. ETTV began channel syndications in the United States in 2003 under the name of ETTV America. In November 2015, Eastern Television renamed as Eastern Broadcasting Company.

== EBC Channels ==
Eastern Broadcasting Company operates several channels:

=== Media Broadcasting in Taiwan（In the Name of 東森電視） ===
- EBC Variety (Chinese: 東森綜合台)
- EBC News (Chinese: 東森新聞台)
- EBC Financial News (Chinese: 東森財經新聞台)
- EBC Drama (Chinese: 東森戲劇台)
- EBC Movie (Chinese: 東森電影台)
- EBC Foreign Movie (Chinese: 東森洋片台)
- EBC Super TV (Chinese: 東森超視)
- EBC Yoyo (Chinese: 東森幼幼台)

=== Media Broadcasting in America（In the Name of 東森美洲衛視 ETTV America） ===
- ETTV News（Chinese: 東森新聞台）
- ETTV East（Chinese: 東森美東台）
- ETTV Drama（Chinese: 東森戲劇台）
- ETTV Global（Chinese: 東森衛視台）
- ETTV China（Chinese: 東森中國台）
- ETTV Yoyo（Chinese: 東森幼幼台）
- ETTV Financial（Chinese: 東森財經台）
- SETI TV（Chinese: 三立國際台）
- ETTV Super TV 34.5（Chinese: 東森超視美洲台）

=== Media Broadcasting in Singapore（In the Name of 東森亞洲衛視 EBC Asia） ===
- EBC Asia on Singtel TV Channels 13 (HD; Complimentary access) and 521 (HD; Jingxuan+)
- EBC Asia News on Singtel TV Channel 561

=== Media Broadcasting in Hong Kong and Macau（In the Name of 東森亞洲衛視 EBC Asia） ===
- EBC Asia on Cable TV Hong Kong on Channel 331
- EBC Asia News on Cable TV Hong Kong on Channel 114
- EBC Asia Yoyo TV on Cable TV Hong Kong On Channel 502 (Still available despite the channel went offline)
- EBC Asia on now TV on Channel 162
- EBC Asia News on now TV on Channel 371
- EBC Asia On Macau Cable TV Channel 22
- EBC Asia News on Macau Cable TV Channel 26

=== Media Broadcasting in the Philippines（In the Name of 東森亞洲衛視 EBC Asia） ===
- EBC Foreign Movie on G Sat Channel 16

== See also ==
- List of Taiwanese television series
