= List of Taiwanese films of the 2020s =

This is a list of films produced in Taiwan ordered by year of release. For an alphabetical list of Taiwanese films see Category:Taiwanese films

== 2020 ==
| Title | Director | Cast | Genre | Notes |
|---|---|---|---|---|
| Do You Love Me As I Love You | Shiue Bin Jian | Chen Yu, Tsao Yu Ning, Patricia Lin, Cheryl Yang | Friendship/ Romance/Drama | |
| Days | Tsai Ming-liang | Lee Kang-sheng, Anong Houngheuangsy | Drama | |
| My Missing Valentine | Chen Yu-hsun | Liu Kuan-Ting, Patty Pei-Yu Lee | Romance/Comedy | |
| Get the Hell Out | Wang I-fan | Bruce Hung, Megan Lai | Zombie / Political / Action / Comedy | |
| Classmates Minus | Huang Hsin-yao | Chen Yi-wen, Cheng Yu-tong, Cheng Jen-shuo, Na Dou | Drama / Dark Comedy | |
| Dear Tenant | Cheng Yu-chieh | Mo Tzu-yi, Chen Shu-fang, Pai Run-yin | Drama / Family / LGBTQ | |
| I WeirDo | Liao Ming-yi | Nikki Hsieh, Lin Po-hung | Romance / Comedy / Indie | |
| A Leg | Chang Yao-sheng | Gwei Lun-mei, Yang You-ning | Drama / Dark Comedy / Romance | |
| The Silent Forest | Ko Chen-nien | Liu Tzu-chuan, Buffy Chen, Liu Kuan-ting | Drama / Crime / Horror / Thriller | |
| Little Big Women | Joseph Chen-Chieh Hsu | Chen Shu-fang, Hiseh Ying-hsuan, Vivan Hsu | Family / Drama | |
| Your Name Engraved Herein | Patrick Liu Kuang-hui | Edward Chen, Tseng Ching-hua, Leon Dai, Jason Wang | Romance / Drama / LGBTQ | |

== 2021 ==
| Title | Director | Cast | Genre | Notes |
|---|---|---|---|---|
| The Sadness | Rob Jabbaz | Berant Zhu, Regina Lai, Tzu-Chiang Wang | Horror | |
| The Soul | Cheng Wei-hao | Chang Chen, Janine Chang, Sun Anke, Christopher Lee | Sci-fi mystery | |
| As We Like It | Li Peiyu | Puff Guo, Aggie Xie, Camille Chalons, Joelle Lu | Romance / Comedy | |
| Gatao - The Last Stray | Jiang Ruizhi | Rexen Cheng, Nikki Hsieh, Jack Kao, Long Shaohua | Action / Crime / Thriller | |
| Man in Love | Yin Chen Hao | Roy Chiu, Tiffany Hsu, Tsai Chen Nan | Romance / Crime / Drama | |
| The Falls | Chung Mong-hong | Alyssa Chia, Gingle Wang, Lee Lee-zen, Chen Yi-wen | Drama | |
| Goddamned Asura | Lou Yi-an | Joseph Huang [zh], Mo Tzu-yi, Peijia Huang, Devin Pan [zh], Wong Yu-xuan [zh] and Hoa-zhe Lai | Crime, Drama | |
| American Girl | Fiona Roan Feng-i | Karena Lam, Kaiser Chuang, Caitlin Fang | Drama | |
| Till We Meet Again | Giddens Ko | Kai Ko, Gingle Wang, Vivian Sung, Umin Boya | Romance, Fantasy, Comedy | |

== 2022 ==
| Title | Director | Cast | Genre | Notes |
|---|---|---|---|---|
| Untold Herstory | Zero Chou | Yu Pei-jen, Cindy Lien, Herb Hsu | Historical | |
| My Best Friend’s Breakfast | Ryan Tu | Moon Lee, Eric Chou | Romance | |
| You Are On My Mind | Lin Jin-he | Zhang Ting-hu, Sonia Yuan Zi-yun, Tsai Cheng-nan | Romance, Historical | |
| Fantasy·World | Freddy Tang Fu-jui | Joseph Chang, Cammy Chiang, Lee Kang-sheng | Legal, Drama, Romance | |
| Gaga | Laha Mebow | Andy Huang, Esther Huang, Wilang Noming, Kagaw Piling | Family, Comedy, Drama | |
| Salute | Yao Hung-i | Sheu Fang-yi | Documentary | |
| The Abandoned | Tseng Ying-ting | Janine Chang, Ethan Juan | Crime | |
| Bad Education | Kai Ko | Kent Tsai, Edison Song, Berant Zhu | Crime, Mystery, Action | |
| Flotsam and Jetsam | Chang Tso-chi | Fox Lee, Tung Liang-yu | Drama | |
| Coo-Coo 043 | Chan Ching-lin | Yu An-shun, Yang Li-yin, Hu Jhih-ciang, Rimong Ihwar | Drama | |
| Incantation | Kevin Ko | Tsai Hsuan-yen, Huang Sin-ting, Kao Ying-hsuan, Sean Lin, RQ | Horror | |
| Mama Boy | Arvin Chen | Kai Ko, Vivian Hsu | Romance, Drama | |
| The Post-Truth World | Chen I-fu | Joseph Chang, Edward Chen, Caitlin Fang, Aviis Zhong, Amber An | Crime, Mystery | |

== 2023 ==
| Title | Director | Cast | Genre | Notes |
|---|---|---|---|---|
| Marry My Dead Body | Cheng Wei-hao | Greg Hsu, Austin Lin | Action, Comedy | |
| Hello Ghost | Pei-Ju Hsieh | Tseng Jing-hua, Ivy Shao, Lu Yi-ching and Chang Zhang-xing | Comedy | |
| Miss Shampoo | Giddens Ko | Vivian Sung, Daniel Hong, Kai Ko, Emerson Tsai and Ying Wei-min | Romantic comedy | |
| The Monk and the Gun | Pawo Choyning Dorji | Tandin Wangchuk, Deki Lhamo, Pema Zangmo Sherpa, Tandin Sonam, Harry Einhorn, Choeying Jatsho, Tandin Phubz, Yuphel Lhendup Selden, Kelsang Choejay | Drama | |

== 2024 ==
| Title | Director | Cast | Genre | Notes |
|---|---|---|---|---|
| Daughter's Daughter | Huang Xi | Sylvia Chang, Karena Lam, Alannah Ong, Winston Chao, Eugenie Liu, Tracy Chou | Drama | |
| Born for the Spotlight | Yen Yi-wen | Hsieh Ying-xuan, Cheryl Yang, Hsueh Shih-ling | Drama | |
