= Marcus Chang =

Taiwanese actor and singer-songwriter

- 張立昂
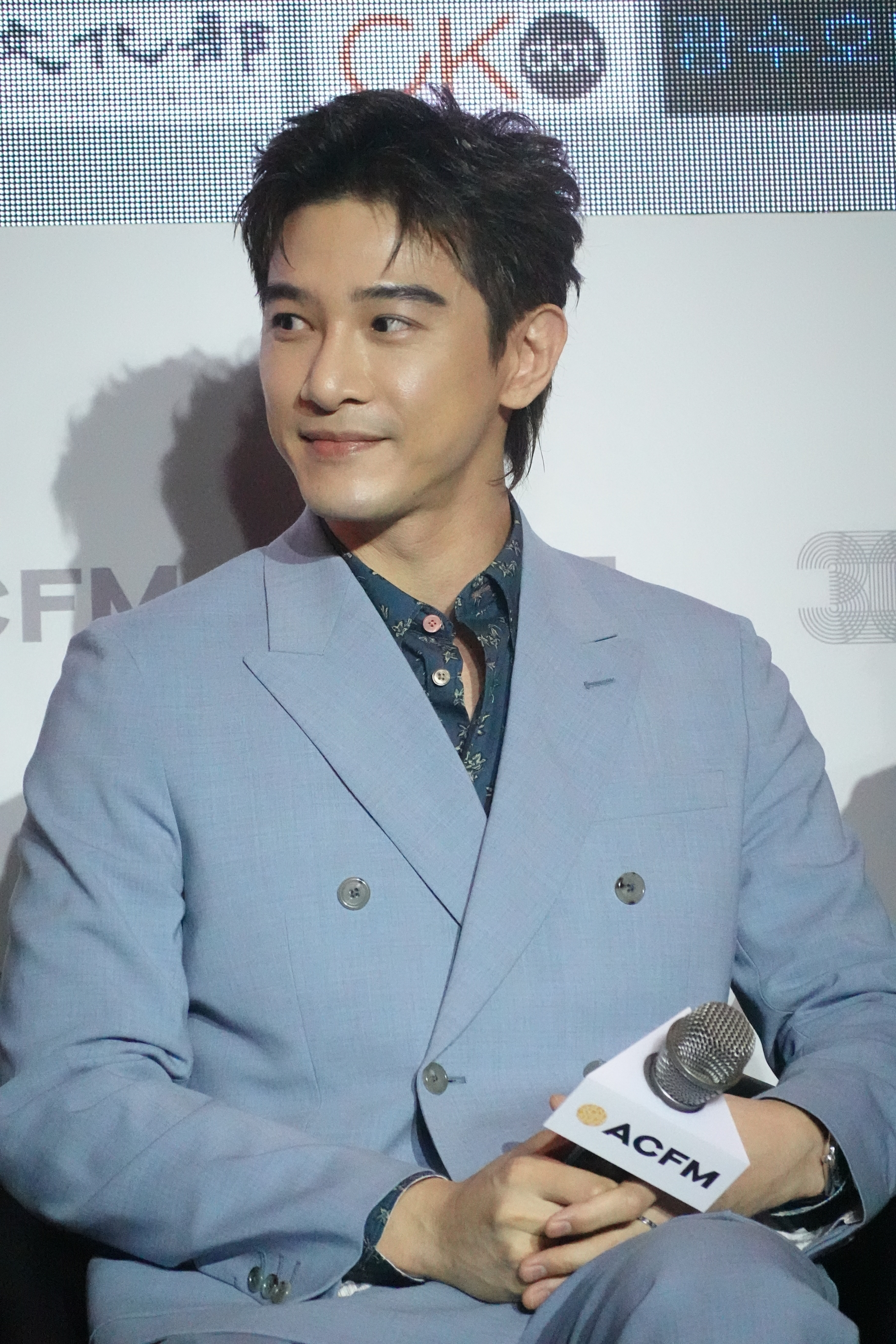
- Chang in 2025
- Born: Chang Wen-chien (張文謙); 28 May 1983 (age 43); Taipei, Taiwan
- Education: University of Auckland
- Occupations: Actor; singer; songwriter
- Years active: 2014–present
- Awards: Seoul International Drama Awards – Asian Star Prize; 2021 Lost Romance
- Musical career
- Also known as: Marcus C
- Origin: Taiwan
- Genres: Mandopop
- Instruments: Vocals, Guitar, Piano
- Label: Sony Music Taiwan

Chinese name
- Traditional Chinese: 張立昂
- Simplified Chinese: 张立昂
Transcriptions
Standard Mandarin
- Hanyu Pinyin: Zhāng Lì'áng
- Bopomofo: ㄓㄤ ㄌㄧˋ ㄤˊ
- Wade–Giles: Chang^{1} Li^{4}-ang^{2}
Hakka
- Pha̍k-fa-sṳ: Chong Li̍p-ngong
Yue: Cantonese
- Jyutping: Zoeng1 Laap6 Ngong4
Southern Min
- Hokkien POJ: Tiuⁿ Li̍p-gông

Marcus Chang (Chinese: 張立昂; born 28 May 1983) is a Taiwanese actor and singer-songwriter. He made his acting debut in the film Café. Waiting. Love (2014) and rose to prominence with the television series Back to 1989 (2016). He gained international recognition for his dual-role performance in the romantic fantasy series Lost Romance (2020), for which he won the Asian Star Prize at the 16th Seoul International Drama Awards. His other notable roles include the television series Behind Your Smile (2016-2017), Between (2018), Trick or Love (2023), and A Controversial Entertainer (2026).

== Early life and education ==
Chang was born on 28 May 1983, in Taipei, Taiwan. He has a younger brother named Jarvis (born 1986). After completing elementary school in Taiwan, Chang was sent to a boarding school. He enrolled at St Peter's College in Auckland, New Zealand. At a young age, he experienced loneliness while living in a foreign country and had to learn independence. He learned to play the piano and guitar at an early age and wrote his first song at the age of 15.

By the age of 17, Chang aspired to become a professional singer-songwriter. Despite his family’s expectations for him to take over the family business, Chang chose to study music academically. In 2005, he graduated from the University of Auckland with a bachelor’s degree in Performing Arts, specializing in popular music, and also studied jazz piano. Additionally, he studied audio engineering at the SAE Institute in Auckland.

After graduation in 2006, Chang returned to Taiwan to help with the family business as his father faced health issues.

In 2007, Chang participated in One Million Star, a Taiwanese televised singing competition.

After completing his one-year mandatory military service in 2009 and following his father’s recovery, Chang decided to leave home due to his family’s opposition to his pursuit of a music career. To support himself, he took on various jobs, including working at Taipei Children’s Amusement Park and Taipei Zoo, where he wore a mascot costume. He also composed songs for children’s theater productions, advertisements, and other projects.

Chang is bilingual, fluent in both Mandarin and English.

== Career ==
=== Acting career ===
In 2012, Chang appeared in commercials for CPC Corporation and Asia-Pacific Interactive Service, which eventually led to his discovery by producer Angie Chai. He was subsequently signed by her management company, Star Ritz International Entertainment.

In 2014, he made his acting debut in Giddens Ko’s film Café. Waiting. Love, portraying the mysterious crush of Vivian Sung’s lead character. In 2015, he was cast in the television series To the Dearest Intruder.

Chang’s breakthrough came in 2016 with his first lead role in the television series Back to 1989, where he played Chen Che, a man from 2016 who accidentally time travels to 1989. His performance brought him widespread recognition, earning him a Best Actor nomination and the Best Potential Award at the 5th Sanlih Drama Awards.

Chang later starred in the television series Behind Your Smile (2016-2017) as Zhao Yi-ting, a businessman motivated by revenge. In 2018, he took on the role of Luo Cheng-kai, an ambitious executive, in the television series Between.

In 2019, Chang appeared in the film Nina Wu and made a cameo appearance in the television series Let's Go Crazy on Live!.

In 2020, Chang reunited with Vivian Sung in the romantic-fantasy series Lost Romance, where he played dual roles: He Tian-xing, a calm and reserved CEO in the real world, and Situ Ao-ran, a tsundere and domineering CEO in a fictional romance novel world. He was highly praised for his ability to convincingly portray two contrasting characters. Lost Romance was named the "Most Popular Taiwanese Drama of the Year" by DailyView. Chang and Sung were lauded for their on-screen chemistry, which greatly contributed to the series’ popularity. Chang’s performance in Lost Romance further expanded his fanbase, particularly among international audiences, and earned him the Asian Star Prize at the 16th Seoul International Drama Awards in 2021.

In 2021, Chang made a surprise cameo appearance in Giddens Ko’s film Till We Meet Again, playing the college boyfriend of Vivian Sung’s character.

In 2022, Chang was hospitalized for 11 days due to a collapsed lung, requiring emergency treatment and an extended recovery period. After regaining his health, he made his return to acting in 2023 with the television series Trick or Love. However, he soon took another hiatus, revealing that he had been struggling with a recurring collapsed lung, which led to pneumothorax.

After making a full recovery in 2024, Chang attended a press conference in Tokyo, Japan, for his upcoming black comedy miniseries A Controversial Entertainer, set for release in 2026.

=== Music career ===
Chang's debut extended play (EP) Zero (±1) was released by Sony Music Taiwan on 31 August 2018. The EP reflects his dual identity as both an actor and a musician. Following its success, he released his second EP, Oxymoron, on 26 December 2019.

He also held two solo concerts at Legacy Taipei.

Chang also contributed to the soundtrack of television series Lost Romance (2020) with the songs "Lose to You," "Tonight I’m Here," and "Talk To Me."

== Filmography ==
Key
†	Denotes films that have not yet been released

=== Television ===
Year	Title	Role	Notes
2015	To the Dearest Intruder	Zhang Zen Lun	
2016	Back to 1989	Chen Che	
2016-2017	Behind Your Smile	Zhao Yi Ting	
2018	Between	Luo Cheng Kai	
2019	Let’s Go Crazy on LIVE!	Roy	Cameo
2020	Lost Romance	He Tianxing Situ Aoran	
2022	Fairy in the House	Celestial Star	Cameo
2023	Trick or Love	Guan Hengwei	
2025	Impression of Youth	Fine Arts Professor	Cameo
TBA	A Controversial Entertainer †	Tony	Post-production

=== Film ===
Year	Title	Role	Notes
2014	Café. Waiting. Love	Yang Ze Yu	Official debut
2017	Therapist	Xu De	
2018	Nana's Game	Fang Cheng Wei	
2018	How to Train Our Dragon	Imaginary man	Cameo
2019	Nina Wu	Dong Fu	Cameo
2021	Till We Meet Again	Xiao Mi's college boyfriend	Cameo

=== Web series ===
Year	Title	Role
2015	Happy Together	Zhu Jia Hao

=== Theater ===
Year	Title	Role
2015	Love Secretly	Chen Yu Chen

=== Music video appearances ===
Year	Artist	Song title
2018	Maggie Chiang	"Treasure"
2025	Song of Crane	"Glow"

== Discography ==
=== Extended plays ===
EP #	Title	Details	Track listing
1st	Zero (±1)	Released: 31 August 2018; Language: Mandarin; Label: Sony Music Taiwan	Still Love You; You & I; Between Us; Anti-single Singles Club
2nd	Oxymoron	Released: 26 December 2019; Language: Mandarin; Label: Sony Music Taiwan	Between Us 2.0-(DJ KenLin Remix); Talk to Me; 1440 mins; Tonight I'm Here

=== Singles ===
Year	Song title	Notes
2018	"Still Love You"	Between OST
2018	"You & I"	Between OST
2019	"Highway Lover"	
2019	"Tonight I’m Here"	Released in Marcourageous 1st Anniversary Special on 15 October 2019 Lost Romance OST
2020	"Lose to You"	Launched on all digital music platforms on 5 June 2020 Official music video launched on 18 October 2020 Lost Romance OST
2023	"Can’t Wait to See You"	Trick or Love OST ft. Eugenie Liu

=== Compositions ===
Music and lyrics written by Chang.

Year	Song Title	Notes
2011	"When it Comes to You"	
2011	"I'll Be There"	
2012	"Don't Let Me Know"	
2012	"Chain Reaction"	
2014	"Pure Love"	Track by Wu Yong-bin
2018	"Sandwich Girl"	Track by Maggie Chiang Lyrics by Tian Le
2018	"Still Love You"	Between OST
2018	"You & I"	Between OST
2018	"Between Us"	Duet with Sam Lin Between OST
2018	"Anti-single Singles Club"	
2019	"Highway Lover"	Music co-written with Andrew Page
2019	"Tonight I'm Here"	Lost Romance OST
2019	"Talk to Me"	Lost Romance OST
2019	"1440 minutes"	
2020	"Lose to You"	Lost Romance OST

== Awards and nominations ==
Year	Award	Category	Nominated work	Result	Ref.
2016	Sanlih Drama Awards	Best Screen Couple Award	Back to 1989	Won	
2016	Sanlih Drama Awards	Best Potential Award	Back to 1989	Won	
2016	Sanlih Drama Awards	Best Actor Award	Back to 1989	Nominated	
2021	Vidol Drama Awards	Best Kiss Award (with Vivian Sung)	Lost Romance	Won	
2021	Vidol Drama Awards	Best Love Scene Award (with Vivian Sung)	Lost Romance	Nominated	
2021	Vidol Drama Awards	Best Actor Award	Lost Romance	Won	
2021	Seoul International Drama Awards	Asian Star Prize	Lost Romance	Won	
