= Hong Kong Film Award for Best Asian Chinese Language Film =

Annual Chinese film award

- Awarded for: Best Asian Chinese Language Film
- Country: Hong Kong
- Presented by: Hong Kong Film Awards
- First award: 2020
- Currently held by: American Girl (2022)

The Hong Kong Film Award for Best Asian Chinese Language Film is an annual Hong Kong industry award presented for a film considered the best of the year. In order to be eligible for the award films must be in a Chinese language and have either at least one film company legally registered in Asia Region or at least one distribution company legally registered in Hong Kong.

== History ==
- This award replaced the Hong Kong Film Award for Best Film from Mainland and Taiwan.
- The first award was presented during the 2020 39th Hong Kong Film Awards ceremony.

== Winners and nominees ==
Table key
‡	Indicates the winner

Year	Film	Directed by	Ref.
2020 (39th)	An Elephant Sitting Still	Hu Bo	
2020 (39th)	Detention	John Hsu	
2020 (39th)	Shadow	Zhang Yimou	
2022 (40th)	American Girl	Feng-I Fiona Roan	
2022 (40th)	Till We Meet Again	Giddens Ko	
2022 (40th)	My Missing Valentine	Chen Yu-hsun	
