= Patrick Chou =

Taiwanese cinematographer

- 周宜賢
- Born: Chou Yi-hsien; Taiwan
- Occupation: Cinematographer
- Years active: 2011–present

Patrick Chou Yi-hsien (Chinese: 周宜賢) is a Taiwanese cinematographer best known for his frequent collaborations with filmmaker Giddens Ko. He won Best Cinematography in the 14th Taipei Film Awards with the drama film Young Dudes (2012) and Best Cinematography for a Drama Series in the 55th Golden Bell Awards with Netflix crime series Nowhere Man (2019).

== Biography ==
Chou began working part-time after graduating from junior high school in a factory, and later became a wedding photography assistant. He began to learn cinematography by that time, and went on to become a cinematographer for advertising and television companies. In 2011, Chou made his feature film cinematographic debut in feature films with the romance film You Are the Apple of My Eye, directed by Giddens Ko. Since then, Chou has become a frequent collaborator with Ko over the next decade. In the following year, he worked as the cinematographer for the drama film Young Dudes, for which he won Best Cinematography in the 14th Taipei Film Awards. In 2013, Chou filmed the documentary Twelve Nights, produced by Ko, as well as the comedy film Forever Love. He served as the cinematographer for Ko's horror comedy Mon Mon Mon Monsters in 2017 and worked on the psychological horror film Detention in 2019. He also filmed the Netflix crime series Nowhere Man, which won him Best Cinematography for a Drama Series in the 55th Golden Bell Awards.

In 2020, Chou worked as the cinematographer for the romantic comedy film My Missing Valentine, which earned him a nomination for Best Cinematography in the 57th Golden Horse Awards. He collaborated with Ko once again in the romantic comedy film Till We Meet Again, which garnered him another nomination for Best Cinematography in the 58th Golden Horse Awards. Chou filmed Miss Shampoo, another romantic comedy film directed by Ko, in 2023, and John Hsu's horror comedy film Dead Talents Society in 2024.

== Controversy ==
In July 2023, Chou and director Kitamura Toyoharu were accused by an anonymous woman during the MeToo movement of sexually molesting and attempting to rape her when she was interning on the set of the 2013 film Forever Love. Chou refuted the accusations on social media, claiming that he and the accuser were in a relationship at that time.

== Filmography ==
=== Film ===
Year	Title	Notes
2011	You Are the Apple of My Eye	
2012	When a Wolf Falls in Love with a Sheep	
2012	Young Dudes	
2013	Twelve Nights	
2013	Forever Love	
2017	Mon Mon Mon Monsters	
2017	Love Off the Cuff	
2019	Detention	
2019	Someone In The Clouds	
2020	My Missing Valentine	
2021	Till We Meet Again	
2023	Miss Shampoo	
2024	Dead Talents Society	

=== Television ===
Year	Title	Notes
2019	Nowhere Man	

== Awards and nominations ==
Year	Award	Category	Work	Result	Ref.
2012	14th Taipei Film Awards	Best Cinematography	Young Dudes	Won	
2019	55th Golden Bell Awards	Best Cinematography for a Drama Series	Nowhere Man	Won	
2020	57th Golden Horse Awards	Best Cinematography	My Missing Valentine	Nominated	
2021	58th Golden Horse Awards	Best Cinematography	Till We Meet Again	Nominated	
