= Vivian Sung =

Taiwanese actress

- 宋芸樺
- Sung at the 2026 Toronto International Film Festival
- Born: 21 October 1992 (age 33); Taipei, Taiwan
- Education: Fu Jen Catholic University
- Occupation: Actress
- Years active: 2014–present
- Notable work: Café. Waiting. Love; Our Times; Nina Wu; Lost Romance; Till We Meet Again

Chinese name
- Traditional Chinese: 宋芸樺
- Simplified Chinese: 宋芸桦
Transcriptions
Standard Mandarin
- Hanyu Pinyin: Sòng Yúnhuà
- Wade–Giles: Sung^{4} Yün^{2}-hua^{4}
Yue: Cantonese
- Jyutping: Sung3 Wan4waa4
Southern Min
- Hokkien POJ: Sòng Ûn-hôa
- Website: Vivian Sung Instagram VIvian Sung Facebook Vivian Sung YouTube Channel

Vivian Sung Yun-hua (Chinese: 宋芸樺; born 21 October 1992) is a Taiwanese actress. She made her acting debut as the female lead in the film Café. Waiting. Love (2014). She rose to fame with her role in the film Our Times (2015), which earned her a nomination for Best Leading Actress at the 52nd Golden Horse Awards. On television, she starred opposite Marcus Chang in the romantic fantasy series Lost Romance (2020). Her other notable film credits include Nina Wu (2019), Till We Meet Again (2021), and Miss Shampoo (2023).

As of 2024, the global box office of her starring films has exceeded US$450 million.

== Career ==
Before her debut, Sung starred in many short films and music videos, mostly along with her friends. She first appeared in IGUband's music video "So I Stopped". The music video was widely circulated amongst students, resulting in her receiving many short film offers. Thereafter, with a growing interest in the entertainment industry, Sung began by signing a contract with Star Ritz.

Sung's debut movie was screenwriter and producer Giddens Ko's romance film Café. Waiting. Love, in which she plays the lead role of Lee Si-ying. Ko said on his blog that he was hoping to find new people to play the lead roles and had to do a lot of interviews and auditions. At that time, Sung was still a third-year university student, studying at Fu Jen Catholic University, Department of Textiles and Clothing. After Sung's interview with film producer Angie Chai, Ko told his agent, "This girl is perfect for the role!" After several rounds of auditions and interviews, Sung was chosen to play the role. Café. Waiting. Love premiered in August 2014, earning more than NT$200 million at the Taiwan box office, earning Sung much recognition.

In 2015, Sung starred in her second film, Our Times, as lead character Lin Zhen-xin. The film's producer, Yeh Ju-fen, said that after ten auditions, she had never seen an actor like Sung. Director Frankie Chen said in an interview that Sung is a logical thinking girl, but her character is the complete opposite and acts based on her instincts instead. Hence, on her first day of filming, Sung could not even get into character. Mentor Xu Jiehui suggested to break down Sung's elegance, forcing her to learn how to be her character by unlearning how to be herself.

Our Times topped the box office in Taiwan, earning more than NT$400 million. Sung received her first award nomination for Best Actress at the 52nd Golden Horse Awards. Then 22 years old, she was the youngest among the five candidates. While Sung did not win the award, she was praised for her performance of the theme song, "A Little Happiness," at the awards ceremony.

After appearing in two movies, Sung appeared in the TVBS television series Taste of Love as the lead actress, in which she played a tour guide overly obsessed with good food.

Sung in 2016

In 2016, Sung was cast as the lead character, Shen-xi, in the Chinese fantasy web series Proud of Love. The first season aired on Youku on 9 September 2016, and concluded with the second season on 1 January 2017.

The third film that Sung starred in was Take Me to the Moon, in which she played lead character Li En-pei (also named Emma). The film premiered in December 2017.

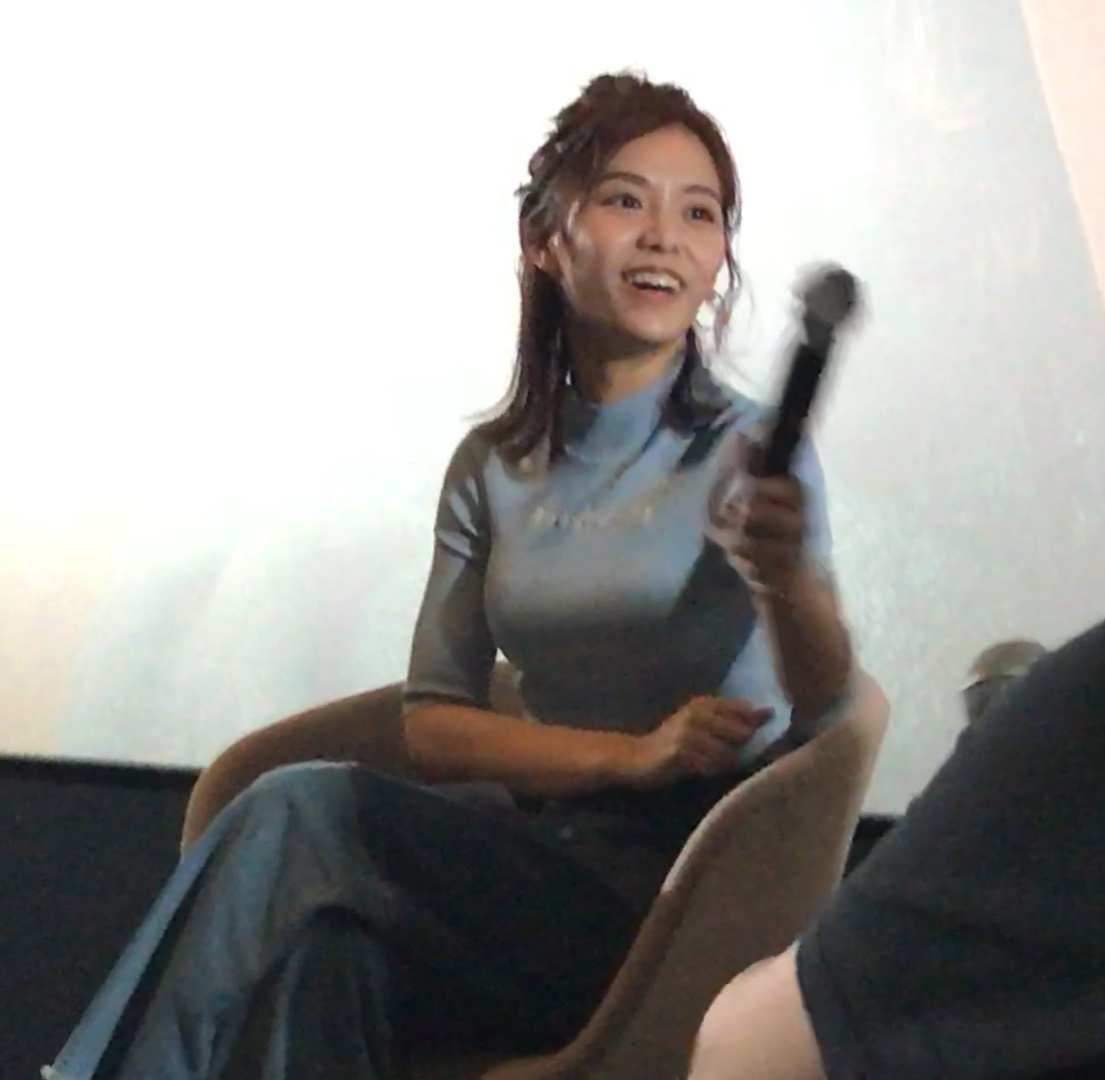
Sung in 2018

In 2020, Sung reunited with her Café. Waiting. Love co-star Marcus Chang in the romantic fantasy series Lost Romance. In the series, she played Zheng Xiao-en, an editor at a publishing company who finds herself transported into the pages of a romance novel and meets the man of her dreams (played by Chang). Lost Romance was named the “Most Popular Taiwanese Drama of the Year” by DailyView. Sung and Chang were widely praised for their on-screen chemistry, making them a fan-favorite duo, with many fans expressing hopes for future collaborations.

On 28 November 2020, Sung launched her YouTube channel where she posts videos featuring her celebrity friends, including Marcus Chang, Bruce Hung, and Simon Lian.

In 2021, Sung starred in the film Till We Meet Again, directed by Giddens Ko. The film performed strongly at the Taiwanese box office and became one of the most talked-about releases of the year.

In 2022, she appeared in the French film For My Country, which is based on the true family story of director Rachid Hami. Sung delivered her performance entirely in English, portraying an intercultural romance with French actor Shaïn Boumedine. The film premiered at the Venice Film Festival.

In 2023, Sung played the lead role in the film Miss Shampoo. That same year, she starred in the film My Heavenly City, delivering a bilingual performance in both Mandarin and English that showcased her language versatility. She also appeared in the Disney+ series Taiwan Crime Stories, where she portrayed twin sisters in a dual role for the first time. That year, Sung also starred as police officer in the fantasy comedy series Oh No! Here Comes Trouble. The series received a high rating of 8.9 on Douban in China, and topped the iQIYI International streaming charts.

In 2024, Sung starred in the drama series The Cleaner as the daughter of the cleaning company’s president. The series follows a team specializing in trauma scene clean-up, exploring the relationships and regrets between the deceased and their loved ones, while reflecting on the life challenges of the main characters. The show topped Netflix Taiwan's charts for three consecutive weeks and received widespread acclaim from both audiences and critics.

In 2025, Sung starred in the movie 96 Minutes. The movie achieved a high box office of over NT$200 million in Taiwan. It was then streamed on Netflix, with 3.1 million views on its first week, making it the 4th most viewed non-English movies worldwide on Netflix from 26th Jan 2026 to 1st Feb 2026.

== Filmography ==
=== Film ===
Year	Title	Role	Notes
2013	Starry Eyes	Hu Nü-nü	Short film
2014	Café. Waiting. Love	Lee Si-ying	
2015	Our Times	Lin Zhen-xin	
2015	Les Aventures d'Anthony	Xiaohei	
2017	Mon Mon Mon Monsters	Student	Cameo
2017	Take Me to the Moon	Li En-pei	
2018	The Way of the Bug	Jing Xiang	
2018	Hello Mr. Billionaire	Xia Zhu	
2019	Nina Wu	Kiki	
2019	Love The Way You Are	Zhou Lin Lin	
2020	Taipei Suicide Story	Jun-Ting	Short film
2021	Till We Meet Again	Hong Jing Qing/Xiao Mi	
2022	For My Country	Julie	
2023	My Heavenly City	Mavis	
2023	Miss Shampoo	Fen	
2025	96 Minutes	Huang Hsin	
2026	The Secret House	Lee-hua	

=== Television series ===
Year	Title	Role	Notes
2015	Taste of Love	Ye Xiaohe	Main role
2016–2017	Proud of Love	Shenxi	Main role
2019	My Spicy Girl	Xia Ruyue	Main role
2020	Memory Eclipse	Guo Wei Na	Main role
2020	My Unicorn Girl	Coach Ma	Cameo
2020	Lost Romance	Zheng Xiao En	Main role
2021	Folklore Season 2: The Rope	Jian Ming Ying	Main role
2023	Oh No! Here Comes Trouble	Chen Chu-ying	Main role
2023	Taiwan Crime Stories	Wang Yu-xuan / Wang Zhong-hui	Main role
2023	At the Moment	Fang Ruo Nan	Main role
2024	The Cleaner	He Li Ying	Main role
2025	Adrift in Love	Pan Hsin-tung	
2026	Confessions	Hsu Yun-chia	

=== Music video ===
Year	Artist	Song	Album
2011	IGUband	So I Stopped	
2013	Mayday	Three Fools	Second Round
2015	Kenny Khoo	The One And Only	The One And Only
2015	Hu Xia	Take Care of Her for Me	Take Care of Her for Me
2015	Ming Bridges	Beautiful Melody	Beautiful Melody
2016	Mayday	Tough	History of Tomorrow
2020	Simon Lian	Walk Away	A Hundred Percent
2020	Geng Sihan	It doesn't matter	
2023	GBOYSWAG	We Are One	Dance Like In Milan
2023	Nine One One	JUST DO YOU	Theme song of Miss Shampoo
2024	Power Station + Accusefive	Log out of your world	Always With You

== Awards and nominations ==
Year	Award	Category	Nominated work	Result
2015	52nd Golden Horse Awards	Best Leading Actress	Our Times	Nominated
2016	Chinese Film Media Awards	Most Anticipated Performance	Our Times	Won
2019	Seoul International Drama Awards	Asian Star Prize	—N/a	Won
2021	Vidol Drama Awards	Best Kiss Award (with Marcus Chang)	Lost Romance	Won
2021	Vidol Drama Awards	Best Love Scene Award (with Marcus Chang)	Lost Romance	Nominated
2021	Vidol Drama Awards	Best Actress Award	Lost Romance	Won
2021	Seoul International Drama Awards	Asian Star Prize	Lost Romance	Nominated
2025	New York Asian Film Festival	Best from the East Award	The Secret House	Won
