= Lost Romance =

2020 Taiwanese television series

- Also known as: Overbearing CEO Fall in Love With Me (霸道總裁愛上我)
- 浪漫輸給你
- Genre: Romance; Comedy; Fantasy; Mystery
- Created by: Sanlih E-Television
- Written by: Chen Jie-ying (Screenwriting coordinator); Huang Xuan-ying; Ceng Xi-bao
- Directed by: Eri Hao
- Starring: Marcus Chang; Vivian Sung; Simon Lian; Kelly Liao; Jason Hsu
- Opening theme: “Can’t Bear to Forget You” by Ariel Tsai
- Ending theme: “Lose to You” by Marcus Chang
- Country of origin: Taiwan
- Original language: Mandarin
- No. of episodes: 20

Production
- Producers: Yang Hong-zhi; Eri Hao
- Camera setup: Multi-camera setup
- Running time: 90 minutes
- Production companies: Sanlih E-Television; Deepwaters Digital Support Inc. Magics & Miracles International Film Entertainment Co., Ltd.

Original release
- Network: TTV
- Release: 7 June – 18 October 2020

Related
- The Wonder Woman; The Devil Punisher

Lost Romance (Chinese: 浪漫輸給你; pinyin: Làngmàn Shū Gěi Nǐ; lit. 'Romance Lost to You') is a 2020 Taiwanese romantic-fantasy television series created and produced by Sanlih E-Television. Starring Marcus Chang and Vivian Sung, it tells the story of an editor in a publishing company who magically finds herself transported into the pages of a romance novel – and comes face-to-face with the man of her dreams. The series premiered on Sundays at 10:00 p.m. on TTV in Taiwan from June 7, 2020, to October 18, 2020, and aired on Saturdays at 10:00 p.m. on cable television SET Metro from June 13, 2020, to October 24, 2020. The series was filmed as it aired. It is available for streaming internationally on Rakuten Viki, Vidol, and Netflix with multilingual subtitles for the global viewers.

DailyView ranked Lost Romance as the “Most Popular Taiwanese Drama of the Year.” It is also one of the highest-rated Taiwanese dramas on Viki, with a score of 9.6 out of 10. The behind-the-scenes clips were broadcast at the end of each episode under the name Encountering Romance Every Second. (Chinese: 遇見浪漫的每一秒).

== Cast ==
=== Main cast ===
- Marcus Chang as He Tianxing/Situ Aoran
- Vivian Sung as Zheng Xiao'en
- Simon Lian as Duanmu Qingfeng/Chen Qing

=== Supporting cast ===
- Kelly Liao as He Mingli
- Jason Hsu as He Tianjian/Situ Moran
- Snowbaby Tsai as Ling Chuchu/Chu Chu
- Tang Zhi Wei as Hu Chaoqin
- Don Wong as He Zhaonan
- Kiki Chen as Susanna/Susan
- Pii as Lin Chuntian/Lin Qiutian
- Sean Lin as Jason
- Deyn Li as George
- Hsu Yuan Kang as Yao Guping
- Hsiao Yao as Xu Qiongmei
- Feng Xian Bo as Chu Yun
- Jacky Liu as Dr. Pan
- Tannie Huang as Dr. Sun

=== Special appearances ===
- Belle Chuo as Dong Fangmeng
- Tony Sun as Cheng Qing
- Puff Kuo as Liu Mushuang

== Production ==
Marcus Chang had previously collaborated with director Eri Hao on the 2018 television series Between. Prior to filming, Marcus Chang had been actively doing weight training and going on a high-protein diet; hoping he could achieve the “cheetah-like” figure described in the script for his role as an overbearing CEO.

This marked Marcus Chang's second collaboration with Vivian Sung since their 2014 film Café. Waiting. Love and his fourth collaboration with Sanlih E-Television. The series is Vivian Sung's small screen comeback in Taiwan after five years.

The entire cast and crew attended the opening press conference held on April 14, 2020.

Filming took place almost entirely in Taichung as well as other locations in Taiwan including Nantou County, Changhua County, and Yunlin County.

Scenes from the wedding ceremony were filmed at the Vena Manor, a popular wedding venue in Changhua County.

The series was awarded $15 million NT in tax credits by the Ministry of Culture of Taiwan.

== Pop Relevance ==
=== Fan meeting ===
With 2000 fans at the event, Marcus Chang, Vivian Sung, Simon Lien, and rest of the cast attended the Lost Romance fan meeting, which was held on August 1, 2020, at Chungyo Department Store in Taichung.

=== LINE stickers ===
In collaboration with LINE TV, Lost Romance launched its own LINE stickers, featuring Marcus Chang and Vivian Sung.

== Soundtrack ==
Title	Artist	Lyrics	Music	Notes
“Can’t Bear to Forget You”	Ariel Tsai	Wu I-wei	JerryC & Ariel Tsai	Opening theme song
“Lose to You”	Marcus Chang			Ending theme song
“Tonight I’m Here”	Marcus Chang			Insert song
“Talk to Me”	Marcus Chang			Insert song
“The Lost Sea”	Ariel Tsai	Ge Da-wei	JerryC	Insert song
“Long Distance”	GJ	Vivian Hsu Rap: GJ	GJ	Insert song
“Loveseat”	Ariel Tsai feat. PiHai Ryan	Ariel Tsai, PiHai Ryan, JerryC		Insert song

== Episode ratings ==
Competing dramas on rival channels airing at the same time slot were:

- CTS – I, Myself, Recipe of Life, U Motherbaker
- FTV – The Mirror, The Rootless, The Story of Three Springs, Animal Whisper
- CTV – Attention, Love! (re-run), Chinese Restaurant (re-run), Chinese Restaurant season 3
- SET Taiwan – Top Singers

Air Date	Chapter	Average Ratings	Rank
Jun 7, 2020	1	0.85	1
Jun 14, 2020	2	0.73	1
Jun 21, 2020	3	0.82	1
Jun 28, 2020	4	0.75	2
Jul 5, 2020	5	0.90	2
Jul 12, 2020	6	0.96	2
Jul 19, 2020	7	1.06	2
Jul 26, 2020	8	0.93	2
Aug 2, 2020	9	1.12	1
Aug 9, 2020	10	1.22	1
Aug 16, 2020	11	1.11	1
Aug 23, 2020	12	1.18	1
Aug 30, 2020	13	0.96	1
Sep 6, 2020	14	0.92	1
Sep 13, 2020	15	1.16	2
Sep 20, 2020	16	0.98	1
Sep 27, 2020	17	1.01	2
Oct 4, 2020	18	1.06	1
Oct 11, 2020	19	1.02	2
Oct 18, 2020	20	1.27	1
Average ratings		1.00	--

- Numbers in red denote the highest rating and numbers in blue denote the lowest rating for the drama's tenure.
- Ratings are obtained from AGB Nielsen.

== Awards and nominations ==
Year	Ceremony	Category	Nominee	Result
2021	Vidol Drama Awards	Best Kiss Award	Marcus Chang & Vivian Sung	Won
2021	Vidol Drama Awards	Best Love Scene Award	Marcus Chang & Vivian Sung	Nominated
2021	Vidol Drama Awards	Best Actor Award	Marcus Chang	Won
2021	Vidol Drama Awards	Best Actress Award	Vivian Sung	Won
2021	Seoul International Drama Awards	Asian Star Prize	Marcus Chang	Won
2021	Seoul International Drama Awards	Asian Star Prize	Vivian Sung	Nominated

== Broadcast ==
Network	Country	First Aired	Timeslot
TTV	Taiwan	June 7, 2020	Sundays 10:00–11:30pm
SET Metro	Taiwan	June 13, 2020	Saturdays 10:00–11:30pm
LINE TV	Taiwan	June 7, 2020	New episode available every Sunday 12:00am
myVideo	Taiwan	October 31, 2020	All episodes available
Netflix	Taiwan	November 1, 2020	All episodes available
SET Variety	Taiwan	November 21, 2020	Saturdays 8:00–10:00pm
Vidol	Worldwide	June 7, 2020	New episode available every Sunday 11:30pm
Viki	Worldwide	June 10, 2020	New episode available every Wednesday
Chunghwa TV	South Korea	September 28, 2020	Monday–Thursday 11:00–12:00pm
CatchPlay+	Singapore	September 30, 2020	Episodes 1–17; episodes 18–20 available every Thursdays
CatchPlay+	Indonesia	October 8, 2020	10/8 episodes 1–8 uploaded 10/15 episodes 9–16 uploaded 10/26 episodes 17–20 uploaded
BS11	Japan	April 1, 2022	Monday-Friday 1:00-1:30pm
YouTube	Worldwide	June 17, 2024	All episodes available; 31 episodes total
