= Miss Shampoo =

2023 Taiwanese film by Giddens Ko

- Theatrical release poster
- Traditional Chinese: 請問，還有哪裡需要加強
- Literal meaning: May I ask, where else improvements can be made?
- Hanyu Pinyin: Qǐngwèn, hái yǒu nǎlǐ xūyào jiāqiáng
- Directed by: Giddens Ko
- Screenplay by: Giddens Ko
- Based on: Precisely Out of Control by Giddens Ko
- Produced by: Giddens Ko; Lu Wei-jun
- Starring: Vivian Sung; Daniel Hong; Kai Ko; Emerson Tsai; Ying Wei-min
- Cinematography: Patrick Chou
- Edited by: Milk Su
- Music by: Chris Hou
- Production company: Machi Xcelsior Studios
- Distributed by: Machi Xcelsior Studios
- Release dates: 22 June 2023 (TFF); 26 July 2023 (Taiwan)
- Running time: 120 minutes
- Country: Taiwan
- Language: Mandarin

Miss Shampoo (Chinese: 請問，還有哪裡需要加強) is a 2023 Taiwanese romantic comedy film directed and written by Giddens Ko. Marking his fourth feature, the film was adapted from Ko's 2010 novel Precisely Out of Control. It stars Vivian Sung, Daniel Hong, Kai Ko, Emerson Tsai, and Ying Wei-min, and centers on a triad boss (Hong) who falls in love with a hairstylist (Sung) after she saves him from an assassination attempt.

Giddens Ko originally pitched to adapt Precisely Out of Control into a feature film for 21st Century Fox, the proposal was scrapped due to the company's acquisition. Ko revived the project while producing Bad Education (2022), choosing to adapt only the fourth chapter of the novel with Machi Xcelsior Studios, following their collaboration on Till We Meet Again (2021). Principal photography took place from August to October 2022 in Taipei, Taoyuan, and New Taipei City. The film partnered with the baseball team Rakuten Monkeys, filming scenes at the Rakuten Taoyuan Baseball Stadium and collaborating on the film's marketing campaign.

The film had its world premiere as the opening film of the 25th Taipei Film Festival on 22 June 2023, followed by a theatrical release in Taiwan on 26 July. It became the fourth highest-grossing 2023 Taiwanese film and received mixed reviews from critics, who praised its humor, characters, and incorporation of gangster elements, but the gender stereotypes and sexist dialogue were subject to criticism. It also secured four nominations in the 60th Golden Horse Awards and seven nominations in the 26th Taipei Film Awards, but did not win any of the prizes.

== Plot ==
Tai, a gangster being hunted by a group of Thai assassins, enters a hair salon seeking refuge. Fen, the apprentice, helps conceal him and manages to evade the assassins. Tai survives, but his boss Hsing is murdered by the killers. The other bosses in his triad agree to let Tai take over his deceased boss's business. To express his gratitude for saving his life, Tai visits Fen's salon with his loyal lieutenants Long Legs, Fishy, and Bryan, asking Fen to style his hair. To their surprise, Fen is untalented and leaves Tai's hair looking terrible. However, her fearless attitude in the face of the gangsters impresses Tai. Falling for her, Tai begins to pressure his gang members and even threaten students in public to have their hair styled by Fen.

Long Legs is eager to track down his boss's murderer and starts searching for clues. He manages to locate the Thai assassins at a hotel where they stayed, but discovers that the owner Tung is actually a longtime acquaintance of Tai and had no involvement in the plot. Frustrated by the lack of leads, Long Legs is angered by Tai's seemingly carefree attitude and disappointed with his apparent softness since meeting Fen. During a triad meeting, the other bosses attempt to undermine Tai's faction, making him suspect that one of the three other bosses is the mastermind behind the assassination. After the meeting, Tai catches Fen's boyfriend cheating and orders him to break up with her. When Fen is heartbroken over the breakup, Tai comforts her, leaving a good impression. The two begin dating and form a relationship. To surprise Fen, Tai invites Cheng, a baseball player she idolizes, to a party. However, seeing Cheng drunk and friendly with the gangsters leads Fen to believe he is associated with them, shattering her fantasy. She scolds Cheng and storms out. Tai tries to reconcile with Fen, but they have a falling out and break up.

Cheng later visits Fen's salon, explaining that Tai was his high school baseball team captain, expelled for protecting his teammates from harassment by thugs. Even as a professional player, Tai continues to protect him from gang harassment and refuses to participate in match-fixing. Learning the truth, Fen regrets breaking up with Tai and decides to reach out to him. Meanwhile, Long Legs is having a massage with Four-Eye, Boss Chuan's lieutenant, who invites him to betray Tai. He then receives a message from Tai asking to meet at a bathhouse, with Four-Eye secretly observing. During their meeting, Tai expresses his desire to leave the triad for Fen and asks Long Legs to take his place, but Long Legs hesitates. Tai then reveals what happened on the night of Hsing's death, where Hsing pushed him toward the assassins to buy time for his escape, making Tai reluctant to seek revenge. Realizing the truth, the two reconcile. However, the Thai assassins arrive and attack Tai and Long Legs. They are outnumbered and severely injured. Fen is anxious about their prolonged absence.

Four-Eye then shows up and reveals Chuan as the mastermind, stabbing Tai in the stomach. However, Long Legs has summoned help using his smartwatch, and Four-Eye surrenders when Fishy and Bryan arrive to rescue their boss. After their escape, the gang initially wants to take Tai to the hospital, but he insists on going to Fen's salon instead. At Tai's request, Tung breaks into Chuan's lair, killing him in revenge. Once the revenge is complete and seeing Fen safe, Tai slowly closes his eyes in the car.

In the mid-credits scene, Tai recovers with a mysterious strength and enters Fen's salon, hugging her tightly as they confess to each other.

== Cast ==
- Vivian Sung as Fen, a hair salon apprentice who aspires to become a hairstylist
- Daniel Hong as Tai, a timid gang leader who falls in love with Fen. Hong had previously portrayed a gangster also named Tai in Bad Education (2022) produced by Giddens Ko.
  - Hu Jhih-ciang as young Tai, a high school baseball team captain
- Kai Ko as Long Legs, Tai's vengeful right-hand man who is disappointed with Tai's apparent softness
- Emerson Tsai as Fishy, a high-ranking member in Tai's gang who falls in love with Guan
- Ying Wei-min as Bryan, a high-ranking member in Tai's gang who respects and enjoys mimicking Long Legs

Also appearing in the film are Bruce Hung as Cheng Hsu-hsiang, a baseball player idolized by Fen; Kent Tsai as Guo, Fen's ex-boyfriend who cheated on her; Chung Hsin-ling as Fen's mother; Bai Bai as Guan, Fen's salon colleague; Kuo Tzu-chien, Miao Ke-li and Honduras as Boss Chuan, Auntie Gold, and Boss North, the highest-ranking bosses in Tai's triad; Hsia Teng-hung as Four-Eye, Boss Chuan's right-hand man; Duan Chun-hao as Boss Hsing, Tai's boss who was assassinated in the beginning of the film; and Duncan Chow as Boss Tung, a Dongguan-originated and Cantonese-speaking mafia boss acquainted with Tai. Singer Chern Hawyeu cameos as a smoothie shop customer.

== Production ==
=== Conception ===
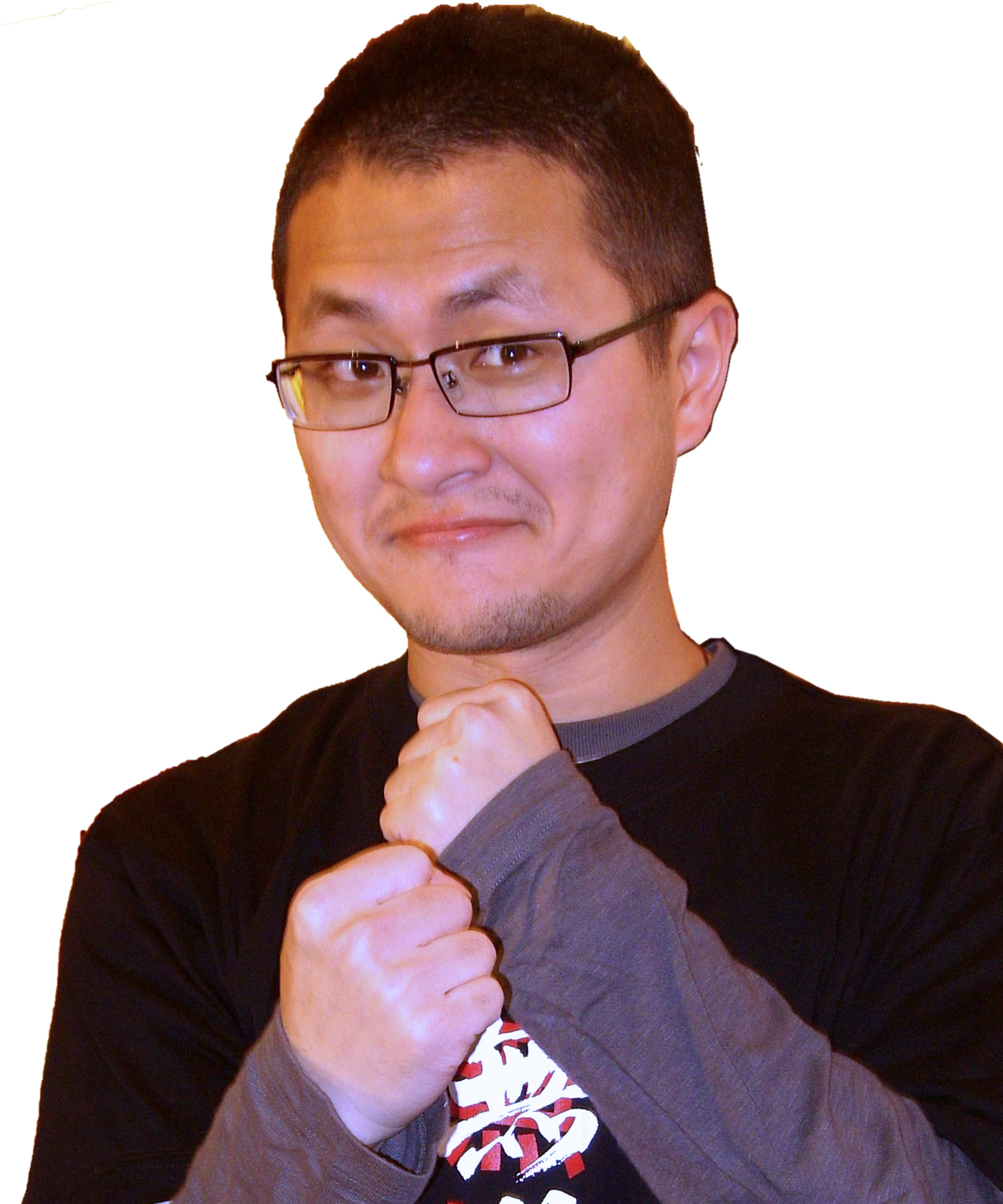
Director and screenwriter Giddens Ko

Miss Shampoo is loosely based on the fourth chapter "This is the Feeling I Want" (Chinese: 這是我要的感覺) of Giddens Ko's 2010 novel Precisely Out of Control. Producer Lu Wei-jun, who was then working for 21st Century Fox and was acquainted with Giddens Ko from the international distribution of You Are the Apple of My Eye (2011), expressed interest in collaborating further with Ko. Ko proposed adapting Precisely Out of Control into a feature film but purposefully excluded the fourth chapter from the initial outline, believing it could stand alone as its own film. The project was ultimately scrapped due to the acquisition of 21st Century Fox. After joining Machi Xcelsior Studios, Lu selected and oversaw the production of Till We Meet Again (2021), another film adaptation of Ko's novel. Following their collaboration, Ko proposed reviving their earlier proposal to adapt Precisely Out of Control, this time focusing on the fourth chapter, which he described as "the most lovable chapter of the novel". Ko conceived the idea of adapting this novel while producing Bad Education (2022), and the project marks his fourth feature film as a director. He described the story as triads-themed, emphasizing his desire to portray "the triad members as admirable through their experiences of falling in love". While adapting the novel into a screenplay, he shifted the time setting to the modern day, whereas the novel was set prior to the 1997 match-fixing scandal involving the China Times Eagles and the Jungo Bears. In early 2022, the film received NTD$8 million funding from the Ministry of Culture's National Development Fund. During the scriptwriting phase, the crew sought to collaborate with a baseball team for the production but faced rejections from multiple teams due to concerns about the film's dialogue. Ultimately, the film partnered with the Rakuten Monkeys.

=== Pre-production ===
Pre-production began in July 2022, including casting and location scouting, with filming expected to commence in September 2022. Singer Jeffrey Huang was initially cast in the lead role as Tai, prompting the production company to increase the film's budget due to his involvement. Giddens Ko envisioned the character as middle-aged and bilingual, returning from America to reclaim his position as a gang boss, to suit Huang's traits. However, Huang dropped out after taking acting classes, citing scheduling conflicts and a greater interest in another one of Ko's projects, Kung Fu, which was stalled in development. Huang recommended Daniel Hong, a rapper from the band Nine One One who only had cameo appearances in films previously, to substitute him. Ko recognized Hong's acting potential after seeing him play a gangster in Bad Education. Vivian Sung, a frequent collaborator of Ko, volunteered to join the production before it commenced, and Ko agreed, writing the screenplay with a character based on her. Sung also served as a major investor in the film. To prepare for their roles, Hong took four months of acting classes, while Sung learned hairstyling for two months, including traditional hair washing and modern salon massage techniques. Sung also lost 5 kg for her character.

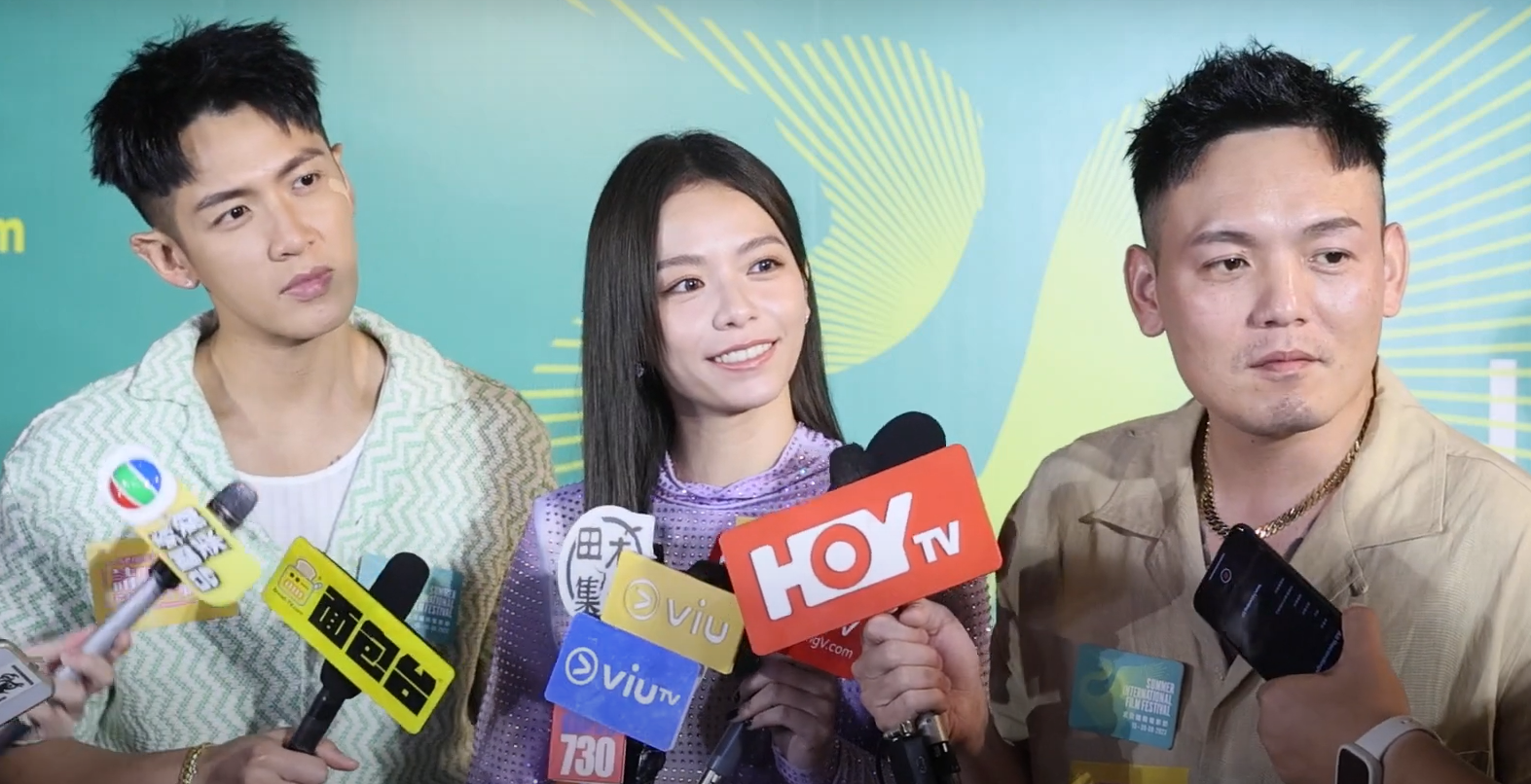
Kai Ko (left), Vivian Sung, and Daniel Hong promoting the film at the Cine Fan Summer International Film Festival

Kai Ko, another frequent collaborator of Giddens Ko, was cast in the early stages of the film as an original character not from the novel, written specifically for him. Kai was initially hesitant about playing a sidekick, but Ko provided him with a backstory that highlighted the character's significance and assured him of his interest in writing a spin-off film centered on the character. Ko's other frequent collaborators Emerson Tsai, Bruce Hung, and Kent Tsai also returned to the project, with Ko noting their familiarity and chemistry as crucial to the story. Hung underwent three days of baseball training to prepare for his role. Hu Jhih-ciang secured his role before the 59th Golden Horse Awards through three rounds of auditions. On 1 August 2022, Daniel Hong and Vivian Sung were confirmed as the lead cast, while other details about the film remained under wraps. On 24 August, Giddens Ko released photos of a table-read and revealed the film's Chinese title.

=== Filming ===
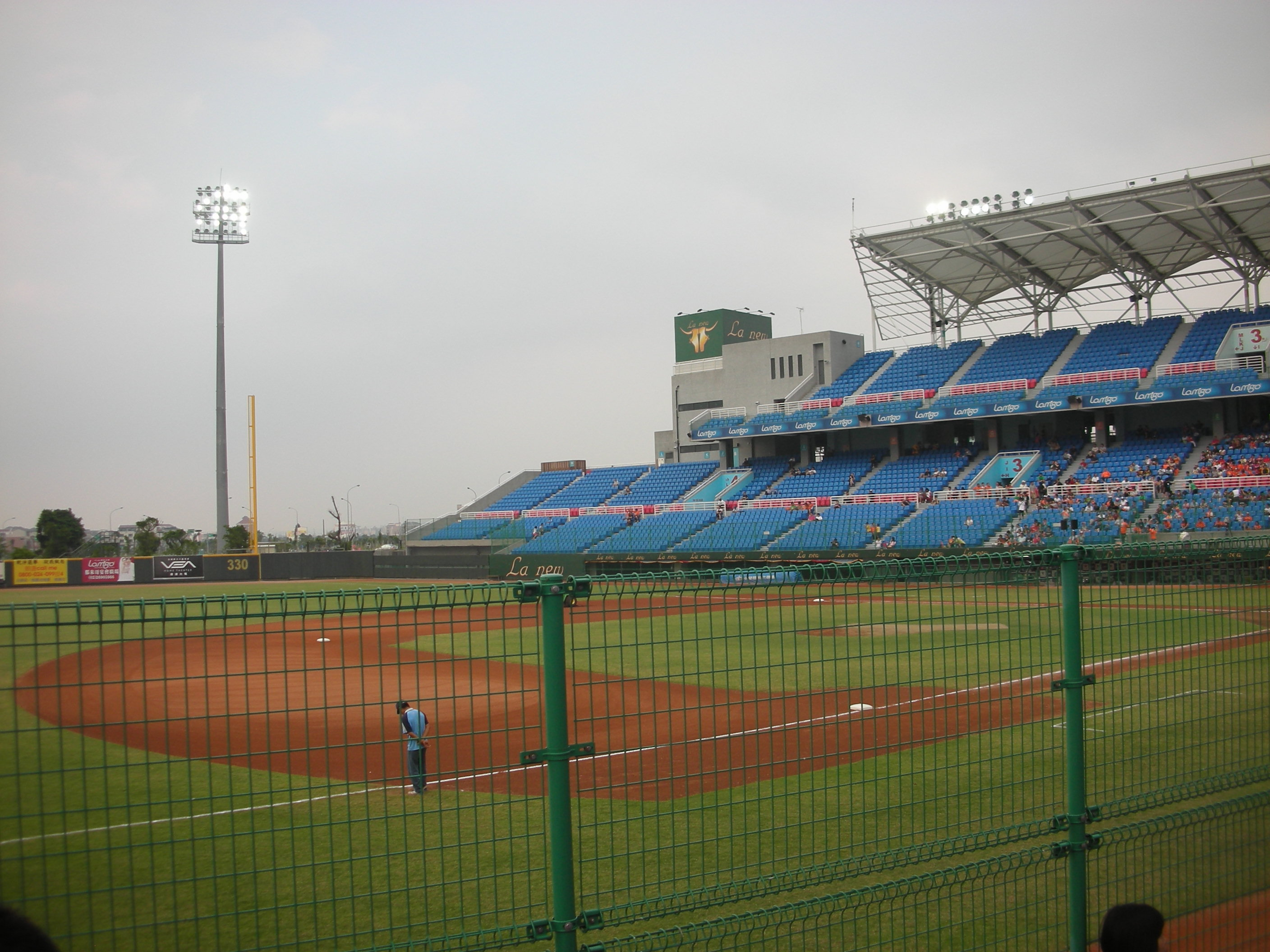
The baseball scenes were filmed at the Rakuten Taoyuan Baseball Stadium

Principal photography began on 23 August 2022, lasting 40 days with an average of nine hours of filming each day. Patrick Chou, a frequent collaborator of Giddens Ko, returned to the project as cinematographer. Ko noted that he tried to maintain a joyful filming environment to encourage comedic improvisation from both the actors and the crew. The Mei-mun Hair Salon, a main set for the film, was designed and built in an empty shop located in Ximending, Taipei. Several local residents accidentally walked onto the production set during filming, mistaking the hair salon for an actual business. Daniel Hong and Vivian Sung were spotted filming at Jingmei Night Market, Taipei on 3 October. Hong wore a wig for 90% of his scenes, but he dealt with itching from the wig adhesive due to his sensitive skin. Kai Ko and Emerson Tsai were announced as part of the cast in the same month. Filming in Taoyuan included baseball scenes at the Rakuten Taoyuan Baseball Stadium, and bathhouse scenes in the Zhongli District. Ko initially explored bathhouses in Taipei during location scouting but found their interior design too modern and not reflective of the atmosphere he desired, so he chose to film in Taoyuan instead. Location shooting also took place in New Taipei City, including at Shulin District and Zhonghe District. Filming ultimately concluded on 17 October, spanning approximately one and a half months.

=== Distribution and marketing ===
In October 2022, the Korean company Barunson E&A acquired the international distribution rights for the film, marking its first non-Korean feature, while Edko Films and Clover Films handled sales in Hong Kong and Southeast Asia. In March 2023, the film was scheduled for a summer release. The film was presented at the Cannes Film Market in May, and an official trailer was released in the same month. In July, the Rakuten Monkeys announced their team lineup for competition in Japan, which included Cheng Hsu-hsiang, Bruce Hung's character, and the announcement was later revealed to be part of the film's marketing campaign. On 10 August, Hung, Daniel Hong, and Vivian Sung participated in a ceremonial first pitch for the Rakuten Monkeys. The film's end credits included voice recordings of a conversation between Giddens Ko, Daniel Hong, and Vivian Sung discussing the choice of performer for the theme song.

=== Music ===
The film's theme song "Just Do You" was composed and performed by Daniel Hong's band Nine One One. The song faced online backlash for its lyrics containing sexual innuendos, and the film's release coincided with the resurgence of the #MeToo movement in Taiwan, (Note: The #MeToo movement resurged in Taiwan in May 2023 when a politician publicly accused a film director of sexual molestation, prompting numerous politicians and entertainers to disclose allegations of sexual harassment and assault starting in June 2023.) prompting lead actor and composer Daniel Hong to publicly apologize. The film also featured Michael Shih's 1995 song "Good-Bye My Dear Almost Lover". Giddens Ko became aware of this song when Shih performed it in a live cover on Nasi Li's YouTube channel, leading him to reach out to Shih to rearrange it for piano for use in the film. Shih's song was also used as the background music of the film's trailer. "Red Scarf", the theme song from Ko's Till We Meet Again, and "Loyal Valiant Rakuten" (勇敢樂天), the fight song of Rakuten Monkeys, were both included as Easter eggs.

== Release ==
Miss Shampoo had its world premiere as the opening film of the 25th Taipei Film Festival on 22 June 2023, followed by a theatrical release in Taiwan on 26 July. The film was also screened at the 22nd New York Asian Film Festival, the 27th Fantasia International Film Festival in Montreal, Canada, and in the World Focus section of the 36th Tokyo International Film Festival. It became available for streaming on Netflix starting 28 December 2023.

== Reception ==
=== Box office ===
Miss Shampoo grossed over NTD$20 million in its first week of release, directly ascending to the top of Taiwan's weekly box office. It accumulated over NTD$40 million in its second week, and concluded its theatrical run with approximately NTD$70 million. The film was the fourth highest-grossing Taiwanese film domestically in 2023. Harper's Bazaar described the box office performance as "not very impressive"; Liberty Times called the figures as "not entirely satisfactory" and suggested that it should have grossed more; Berton Hsu of The News Lens commented that while the Taipei box office results were satisfactory, the figures in central and southern Taiwan fell short, and the total revenue was also significantly lower than that of Giddens Ko's previous projects You Are the Apple of My Eye (2011), Mon Mon Mon Monsters (2017), and Till We Meet Again (2021).

=== Critical response ===
Miss Shampoo's critical reception was divided, with Elle Taiwan describing it as "widely well-received", while Harper's Bazaar reported that some Taiwanese critics criticized it for being filled with gender stereotypes and female objectification, leading to negative reviews as the film's release coincided with the 2023 Taiwanese MeToo movement. As of late August 2023, the film held a rating of 5.2/10 on the Chinese media review platform Douban.

James Marsh of the South China Morning Post gave the film 3/5 stars, commenting that Miss Shampoo is a "giddily self-satisfied romantic comedy" that, while bursting with youthful energy and clever plotting, is ultimately undermined by a juvenile sense of humor, despite its charming leads and engaging premise. Tay Yek Keak of 8days gave the film 3.5/5 stars and described the film as a chaotic mix of romance, drama, and violence, noting that while the genres blend effectively, Giddens Ko's talent for coming-of-age stories and memorable characters ultimately elevated the film despite a "cop-out" ending. V.N. Pryor of Cinapse offered a positive review, praising the film as "raucous, laugh filled", expertly blending romantic comedy and crime elements, and highlighting Giddens Ko's improved ability to engage audiences.

Estella Huang of Mirror Media criticized the film for closely resembling the story and character settings of the Korean film Man in Love (2014), and noting that its emphasis on humor over emotional depth undermines the seriousness of the central romance, resulting in a narrative that feels more like a variety show than a cohesive story. Berton Hsu, in his review for The News Lens, emphasized that "the box office was below expectations", finding that the chaotic blend of humor, dark themes, and romance elements, combined with a disjointed narrative filled with clichés, resulted in a lackluster adaptation. Chi Chu-yi, reviewing for Yahoo! News, lamented the film as "a work of failure", criticizing the clichéd romantic relationship between Tai and Fen, along with crude dialogue that are derogatory to women and noting that the male characters are rendered stereotypical, suggesting that Ko seems to be "stuck in his own parallel universe" in contrast to the rising #MeToo movement.

Hong Kong film critic Sek Kei highlighted that the film features a tough gangster who falls for a quirky hairdresser, integrating heroic bloodshed elements typical of Hong Kong cinema alongside charming characters and witty details, but he had reservations on whether it would resonate with contemporary Hong Kong audiences given the evolving landscape of gangster films. Siu Yu echoed Sek's views in her review for am730, noting that the film's playfulness and character interactions reflect Giddens Ko's signature style, with creative decisions shaped by his sincerity and passion for the Hong Kong Young and Dangerous film series. Keith Ho, writing for HK01, also acknowledged that the film pays homage to Hong Kong cinema, effectively blending action and gangster elements typical of Hong Kong films with romance and drama, all while making significant changes to its source material, resulting in an entertaining and emotionally engaging experience.

== Awards and nominations ==
Year	Award	Category	Nominee	Result	Ref.
2023	60th Golden Horse Awards	Best New Performer	Daniel Hong	Nominated	
2023	60th Golden Horse Awards	Best Art Direction	Wu Jo-yun	Nominated	
2023	60th Golden Horse Awards	Best Makeup & Costume Design	Karen Yip, Hsiao Pai-chen, Liu Hsien-chia	Nominated	
2023	60th Golden Horse Awards	Best Action Choreography	Scott Hung	Nominated	
2024	26th Taipei Film Awards	Best Director	Giddens Ko	Nominated	
2024	26th Taipei Film Awards	Best Screenplay	Giddens Ko	Nominated	
2024	26th Taipei Film Awards	Best Supporting Actor	Kai Ko	Nominated	
2024	26th Taipei Film Awards	Best New Talent	Daniel Hong	Nominated	
2024	26th Taipei Film Awards	Best Editing	Milk Su	Nominated	
2024	26th Taipei Film Awards	Best Makeup & Costume Design	Karen Yip	Nominated	
2024	26th Taipei Film Awards	Best Sound Design	Vivian Kao, Kenny Cheng, Chu Shih-yi	Nominated	
