= Kai Ko =

Taiwanese actor and singer (born 1991)

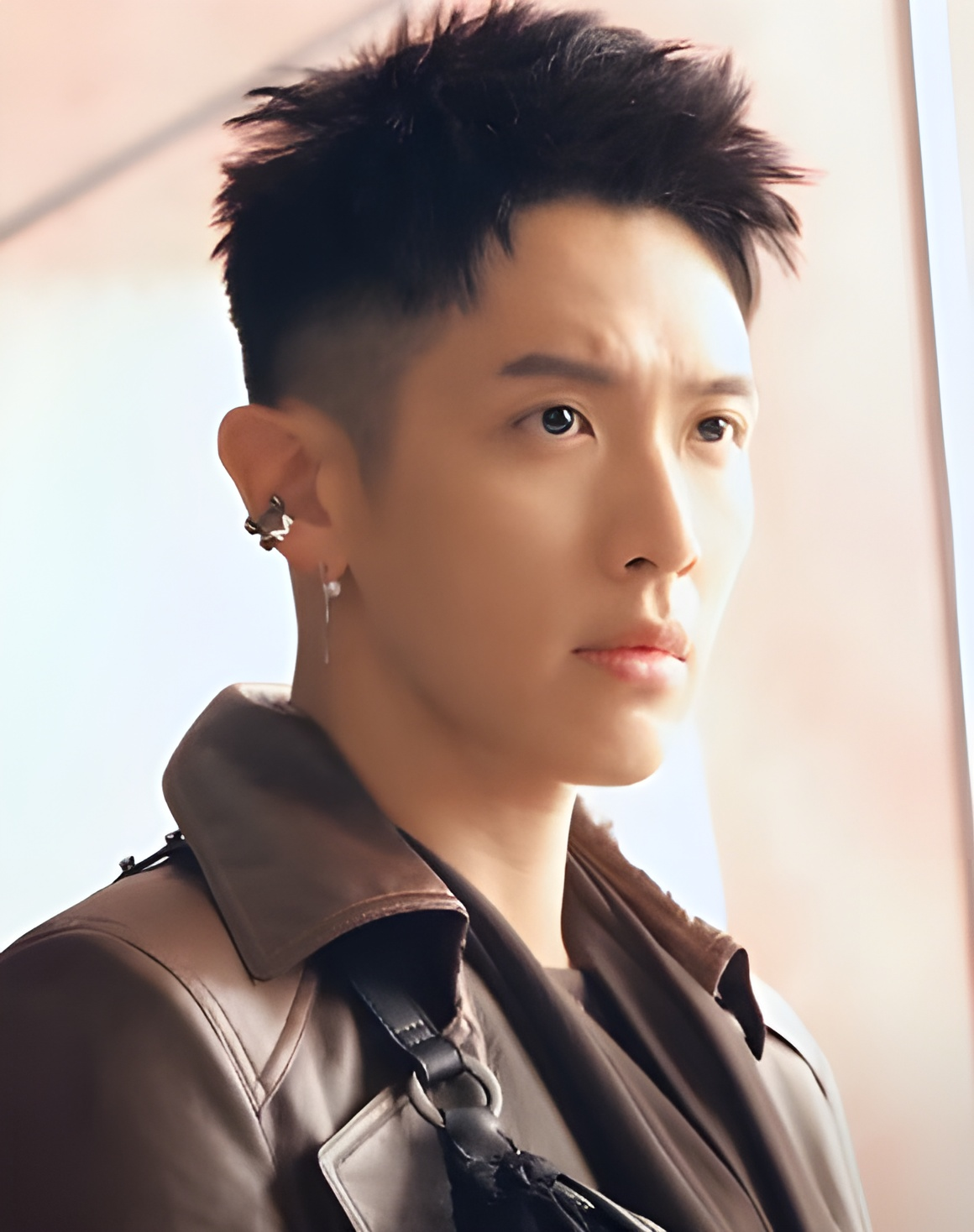
- Ko in 2023
- Born: Ko Chia-kai (柯家凱); 18 June 1991 (age 35); Penghu County, Taiwan
- Education: Chinese Culture University
- Occupations: Actor; singer; film director
- Years active: 2011–present
- Awards: Full list
- Musical career
- Also known as: Ke Zhendong
- Origin: Taiwan
- Genres: Mandopop
- Label: Sony Music

Chinese name
- Traditional Chinese: 柯震東
- Simplified Chinese: 柯震东
Transcriptions
Standard Mandarin
- Hanyu Pinyin: Kē Zhèndōng
Yue: Cantonese
- Jyutping: O1 Zan3 Dung1
Southern Min
- Hokkien POJ: Koa Chìn-tong

Kai Ko Chen-tung (Chinese: 柯震東; Pe̍h-ōe-jī: Koa Chìn-tong; born Ko Chia-kai on 18 June 1991) is a Taiwanese actor, singer and film director.

== Career ==
Ko rose to fame with You Are the Apple of My Eye (2011), for which he won Best New Actor at the 48th Golden Horse Awards and 12th Chinese Film Media Awards. He released his debut studio album, Be Yourself, the same year.

Following the success of the Tiny Times film series, his career was disrupted in 2014 when he was arrested in Beijing for marijuana possession, along with Jaycee Chan, leading to their blacklisting in mainland China. Ko's scenes in the Chinese films Monster Hunt and Tiny Times 4 were removed. His advertisement deals and his variety show engagements were also cancelled.

Ko returned to acting with The Road to Mandalay (2016) in Taiwan. In 2020, A Choo, a film he had acted in before the 2014 arrest, was released in Taiwan after he acquired the distribution rights from the Chinese copyright holder.

In 2021, Ko worked with Giddens Ko again in Till We Meet Again. In 2022, Ko won Best Actor at the 24th Taipei Film Awards for his role in the film.

== Personal life ==
=== Relationships ===
Ko dated Cherry (黃慶宜), a TV showgirl, before he became famous for You Are the Apple of My Eye. He made headlines when his romance with pop singer Elva Hsiao, who is 12 years senior to him and a bigger star, broke in 2012. Ko then has an on-and-off relationship with singer Tia Lee since 2014.

=== Drug use ===
Ko had appeared in a 2012 anti-drug advertisement in Taiwan in which he and other celebrities declared, "I don't use drugs".

On 18 August 2014, Ko was arrested along with Jaycee Chan by the Beijing Police for drug use, amid a broad anti-drug crackdown on the Chinese celebrities. Police said both actors tested positive for marijuana and admitted using the drug. Ko was placed in administrative detention for 14 days. He was released on 28 August and faced another round of interrogations by the Taipei District Prosecutors Office after returning to Taiwan.

On 29 June 2018, NARS invited Ko to a promotional event in Taipei. After backlash on Weibo, NARS China issued a statement on 1 July expressing regret over the Taiwan team’s decision and apologizing; Ko deleted his social media posts of the event the same day.

== Filmography ==
=== Film ===
Year	Title	Role	Notes	Ref.
2011	You Are the Apple of My Eye	Ko Ching-teng	Golden Horse Awards for Best New Actor; Chinese Film Media Awards for Best New Actor	
2012	When a Wolf Falls in Love with a Sheep	Tung / Wolf		
2013	Machi Action	Face (stand-in)	Cameo	
2013	Together	A-tzu		
2013	Tiny Times	Gu Yuan		
2013	Tiny Times 2	Gu Yuan		
2013	Dive in 2013	Ke Dong	Short film	
2014	Dive in 2014	Ke Dong	Short film	
2014	Tiny Times 3	Gu Yuan		
2015	Monster Hunt		Scenes edited out due to drug use conviction	
2015	Tiny Times 4	Gu Yuan	Scenes edited out due to drug use conviction	
2016	The Road to Mandalay	Ah Guo		
2017	Mon Mon Mon Monsters	Student on bus	Cameo	
2020	A Choo	Wang Yi-zhi		
2021	Moneyboys	Fei		
2021	Till We Meet Again	Ah Lun	Taipei Film Awards for Best Actor	
2021	Grit	Croc / Xiao Yu		
2022	Mama Boy	Hsiao Hung		
2022	Bad Education	—N/a	Directorial debut	
2023	Miss Shampoo	Long Legs		
2026	We Wish	Chi-hua		
2026	Kung Fu			

=== Television series ===
Year	Title	Role	Notes/Ref.
2022	The Exorcist		
2024	Let's Talk About Chu	Chou Ping-ke	
2024	Imperfect Us	Yu Xiang-li	
2026	Agent from Above	Han Jie	

== Discography ==
Title	Album details	Track listing
Be Yourself 有話直說	Released: November 11, 2011; Format: CD, streaming, download; Label: Star Ritz, Sony Music Taiwan	Track listing: 1. "Qing Rang Wo Jixu Xihuan Ni" (請讓我繼續喜歡你; Please Let Me Continue to Like You); 2. "Qing Bi Wo Ai Ta" (請比我愛她; Please Love Her Better Than I Do); 3. "You Hua Zhi Shuo" (有話直說; Just Say It); 4. "Ai Ni Jie Bu Liao" (愛你戒不了; Can't Stop Loving You); 5. "Ai Jiu Ai" (愛就愛; Just Love); 6. "Piao Liu Ping" (漂流瓶; Drifting Vase) featuring Michelle Chen; 7. "Zuo You" (左右; Left Right); 8. "Feng Suo Ni" (封鎖你; Blocking You); 9. "Be My Baby"; 10. "Bai Shi Zhi Ling" (百式之零; Zero of Hundred)

== Awards and nominations ==
Year	Award	Category	Nominated work	Result	Ref.
2011	48th Golden Horse Awards	Best New Performer	You Are the Apple of My Eye	Won	
2012	12th Chinese Film Media Awards	Best New Performer	You Are the Apple of My Eye	Won	
2012	6th Asian Film Awards	Best Newcomer	You Are the Apple of My Eye	Nominated	
2012	Changchun Film Festival	Best Actor	You Are the Apple of My Eye	Nominated	
2016	53rd Golden Horse Awards	Best Leading Actor	The Road to Mandalay	Nominated	
2017	Youth Film Handbook Awards	Male Actor of the Year	The Road to Mandalay	Won	
2017	8th To Ten Chinese Films Festival	Best Performance by an Actor in a Leading Role	The Road to Mandalay	Won	
2017	58th Asia-Pacific Film Festival	Best Actor	The Road to Mandalay	Nominated	
2021	58th Golden Horse Awards	Best Leading Actor	Moneyboys	Nominated	
2022	24th Taipei Film Awards	Best Actor	Till We Meet Again	Won	
2022	59th Golden Horse Awards	Best New Director	Bad Education	Nominated	
2024	26th Taipei Film Awards	Best Supporting Actor	Miss Shampoo	Nominated	
2024	6th Asia Contents Awards & Global OTT Awards	Best Supporting Actor	Imperfect Us	Nominated	
2024	59th Golden Bell Awards	Best Supporting Actor in a Miniseries or TV Film	Imperfect Us	Won	
