= Moneyboys =

- Film poster
- Traditional Chinese: 金錢男孩
- Simplified Chinese: 金钱男孩
- Hanyu Pinyin: Jīnqián nánhái
- Directed by: C.B. Yi
- Written by: C.B. Yi
- Produced by: Barbara Pichler; Gabriele Kranzelbinder; Guillaume de la Boulaye; Patrick Mao Huang; André Logie
- Starring: Kai Ko; Chloe Maayan
- Cinematography: Jean-Louis Vialard
- Edited by: Dieter Pichler
- Music by: Yun Xie-Loussignian
- Production companies: Arte France Cinéma; KGP Filmproduktion; La Compagnie Cinématographique; Panache Productions; Zorba Production
- Distributed by: ARP Sélection; Flash Forward Entertainment; Avalon eksystent distribution Cola Films (Taiwan)
- Release dates: July 12, 2021 (Cannes); January 21, 2021 (Austria); November 17, 2021 (Belgium); November 19, 2021 (Taiwan); June 10, 2022 (Mubi)
- Running time: 120 minutes
- Countries: Taiwan; Austria; France; Belgium
- Languages: Mandarin; Southern Min

Moneyboys (Chinese: 金錢男孩) is a 2021 Taiwanese-Austrian drama film written and directed by C.B.Yi (as his first feature film), and starring Kai Ko, Chloe Maayan, J.C. Lin, Bai Yufan and Sun Qiheng. In June 2021, the film was selected to compete in the Un Certain Regard section at the 2021 Cannes Film Festival. The film had been a theatrical release in Taiwan on November 19, 2021 distributed by Cola Film.

== Synopsis ==
Fei works illegally as a hustler in order to support his family, yet when he realizes they are willing to accept his money but not his way of life, there is a major breakdown in their relations. Through his relationship to the headstrong Long, Fei seems able to find a new lease on life, but then he encounters Xiaolai, the love of his youth, who confronts him with the guilt of his repressed past.

== Cast ==
- Kai Ko as Liang Fei
- Chloe Maayan as Lulu, Liang Hong/ Li Yu
- Bai Yufan as Liang Long
- JC Lin as Han Xiaolai
- Sun Qiheng as Chen Wei
- Zach Lu as Xiangdong
- Daphne Low as Alian
- Chen Mu as Guo Yong
- Brando Huang as Client Zhang
- Lin I-hsiung as Fei's grandfather

== Awards and nominations ==
| Year | Award | Category | Nominee | Result |
|---|---|---|---|---|
| 2021 | 58th Golden Horse Awards | Best Leading Actor | Kai Ko | Nominated |
| 2021 | 58th Golden Horse Awards | Best New Director | C.B. Yi | Nominated |
