= Kent Tsai =

Taiwanese actor

- 蔡凡熙
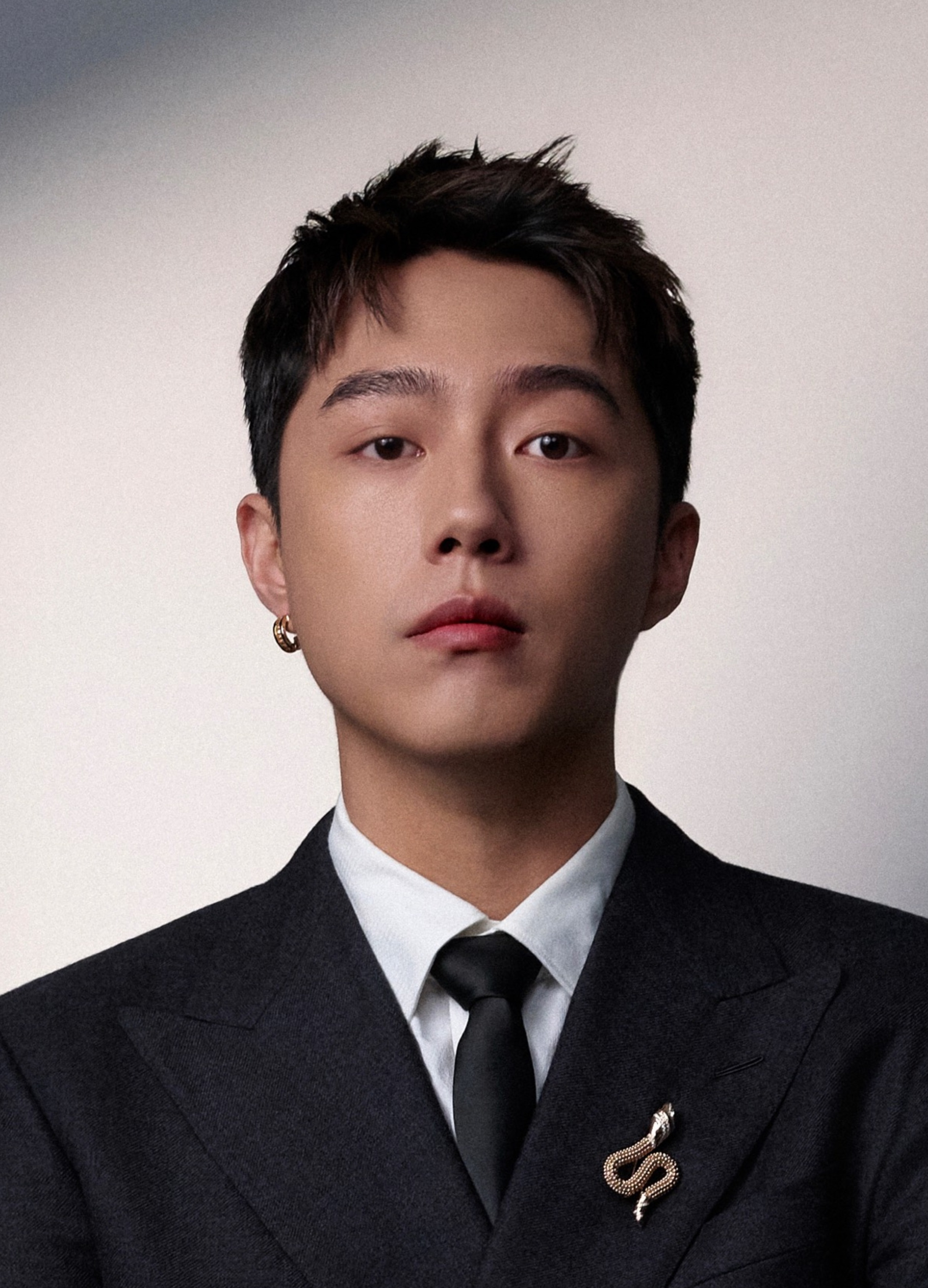
- Tsai in 2026
- Born: Tsai Cheng-hung (蔡承紘); 26 June 1997 (age 29); Tainan, Taiwan
- Other name: Cai Fanxi
- Education: Taipei City University of Science and Technology (BFA)
- Occupation: Actor
- Years active: 2017–present

Chinese name
- Traditional Chinese: 蔡凡熙
- Simplified Chinese: 蔡凡熙
Transcriptions
Standard Mandarin
- Hanyu Pinyin: Cài Fánxī
Southern Min
- Hokkien POJ: Chhòa Hoân-hi

Kent Tsai Fan-hsi (Chinese: 蔡凡熙; pinyin: Cài Fánxī; born Tsai Cheng-hung; 26 June 1997) is a Taiwanese actor.

== Education ==
After graduating from the performing arts department of New Taipei City Private Zhuangjing Senior Industrial Homework Vocational School in New Taipei City, Tsai earned a bachelor's degree in performing arts from the Taipei City University of Science and Technology.

== Career ==
Tsai made his acting debut in HBO Asia's first original series in Mandarin, The Teenage Psychic, in 2017. Also in the same year, he appeared in Giddens Ko's horror film Mon Mon Mon Monsters and starred in romance film All Because of Love.

== Filmography ==
=== Television series ===
Year	English title	Original title	Role	Network	Notes/Ref.
2017	The Teenage Psychic	通靈少女	Ho Yun-le (A-le)	HBO Asia / PTS	
2021	Fluffy Love	都嘛是你的毛	Lu Jiun Shiang		
2021	20 Years Promise	20年的約定	Zhao Tian You		
2021	Sometimes When We Touch	超感應學園	Shi Shao Hua / Stone	iQiyi ViuTV	
2022	49 Days With a Merman	我家浴缸的二三事	Zhao Long Jie	KKTV	
2023	Taiwan Crime Stories	台灣犯罪故事	Zhang Ming Cheng	Disney+	
2024	Haunted House for Sale	幸福房屋事件簿	Yu Ta Chih	CTV	
2026	Million-Follower Detective	百萬人推理	Wei Yan	Netflix	
2026	Miracles of the ER	急診室的奇蹟	Lin Geng-ming	Netflix	Lead role
2027	The Gunshots	鎗聲	Hao-zai	PTS Taigi	Lead role

=== Film ===
Year	English title	Original title	Role	Notes/Ref.
2017	Mon Mon Mon Monsters	報告老師！怪怪怪怪物！	Tuan Jen-hao	
2017	All Because of Love	痴情男子漢	Chen Er-kan	
2018	How To Train Our Dragon	有五個姊姊的我就註定要單身了啊！	Li Chuang Long	
2021	Till We Meet Again	月老	Locomotive Owner	
2022	Say Yes Again	再說一次我願意	Lu Yi Jin / Luke	
2022	Bad Education	黑的教育		
2023	Behind the Blue Eyes	不能流泪的悲伤	Lin Han Cong	
2023	Miss Shampoo	請問，還有哪裡需要加強	Guo	
2024	Breaking and Re-Entering	還錢	Kao	
2025	96 Minutes	96分鐘	Yang Li Hui	
2026	Double Happiness	雙囍	Da-tsai	
2026	The Wife You Never Know	你所不知的妻子		Short film
2027	Happily Ever After	幸福快樂的日子	Yang Le-duo	
2027	Arrested Memory	阿茲海默警探		

=== Music video appearances ===
Year	Artist	Song title
2017	Lee Chien-na	"Never Come Back"
2017	Anna	"I Don't Get it "

== Awards and nominations ==
Year	Award	Category	Nominated work	Result
2017	52nd Golden Bell Awards	Best Newcomer in a Miniseries or Television Film	The Teenage Psychic	Nominated
2017	2nd Asia Artist Awards	Choice Award	—N/a	Won
2017	54th Golden Horse Awards	Best New Performer	All Because of Love	Nominated
