= Nina Wu =

2019 film

- Film poster
- Directed by: Midi Z
- Written by: Wu Ke-xi; Midi Z
- Produced by: Lin Sheng-wen; Molly Fang; Claudia Tseng; Andi Lim
- Starring: Wu Ke-xi; Vivian Sung; Kimi Hsia; Shih Ming-shuai
- Cinematography: Florian Zinke
- Edited by: Matthieu Laclau; Tsai Yann-shan
- Music by: Lim Giong
- Production companies: Seashore Image Productions; Harvest 9 Road Entertainment; Jazzy Pictures
- Distributed by: Seashore Image Productions
- Release dates: 20 May 2019 (Cannes); 19 July 2019 (Taiwan)
- Running time: 103 minutes
- Countries: Taiwan; Malaysia; Myanmar
- Language: Mandarin

Nina Wu (Chinese: 灼人秘密; pinyin: Zhuó Rén Mì Mì; lit. ''Scorching Secrets'') is a 2019 Taiwanese psychological drama film directed by Midi Z. It was screened in the Un Certain Regard section at the 2019 Cannes Film Festival.

== Cast ==
- Wu Ke-xi as Nina Wu
- Vivian Sung as Kiki
- Kimi Hsia as Girl No.3
- Shih Ming-shuai as Director
- Tan Chih-wei as Producer
- Lee Lee-zen as Mark
- Hsieh Ying-hsuan as Casting director
- Rexen Cheng as Nina's assistant
- Huang Shang-Ho as Director's assistant
- Fabian Loo as Producer's assistant
- Cheng Ping-chun as Nina's father
- Moon Wang as Nina's aunt
- Wang Chuan as Nina's mother
- Sung Shao-ching as Nina's uncle
- Yu An-shun as Uncle Wang
- Marcus Chang as Dong Fu
- Wang Shin-hong as Fisherman
- Vicci Pan as Audition girl's mother
- Chiu Yi-si as Audition girl
- Yoko Young as Girl No.1
- Amanda Chou as Girl No.2
- Huang Hsu-wei as Girl No.4
- Phoebe Lin as Girl No.5

== Reception ==
On the review aggregator website Rotten Tomatoes, 81% of 32 critics' reviews are positive. The website's consensus reads: "Tough and timely, Nina Wu takes a fittingly — and purposely — upsetting look at the seedy underbelly of show business." On Metacritic, the film has a weighted average score of 66 out of 100 based on 9 critics, which the site labels as "generally favorable" reviews.
