= Honduras (actor) =

Taiwanese actor

- 洪都拉斯
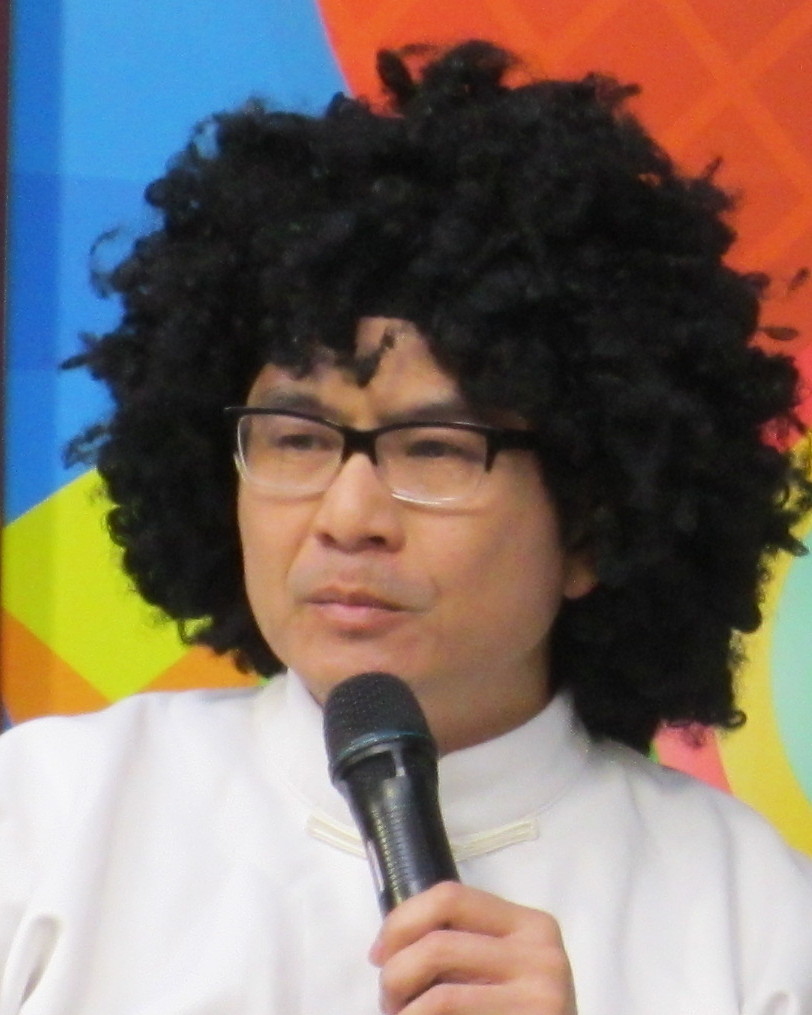
- Honduras in 2013
- Born: Hung Sheng-te (洪勝德); 29 September 1965 (age 60); Taishan, Taipei County, Taiwan, Republic of China
- Occupations: Actor, comedian, television host
- Years active: 1987 – Present
- Children: 2

Hung Sheng-te (born 29 September 1965), professionally known as Honduras, is a Taiwanese actor, television show host, and comedian who is known for impressions.

== Early life ==
Hong attended San-Chung High School. After his military service, he worked briefly at Nan Ya Plastics Corporation.

== Career ==
Hong entered the entertainment industry in 1987, working on costumes and props for the CTS variety show Lien Huan Pao ("Barrage"). Within a year, he started taking on acting roles in the show. In 1991, he decided to leave the show after failing to secure an acting contract.

He worked a variety of jobs, including taxi driver, mail carrier, milkman, gas delivery, mover, shopkeep, furniture salesman, and truck driver. However, a chance meeting with actor Peng Chia Chia gave him the opportunity to return to the entertainment industry as Peng's chauffeur and assistant.

In 1998, Hong joined Hsu Hsiao-shun's acting troupe Rock Family. Hsu thought of Hong's stage name Hung Tu La Ssu, which sounded the same as the Central American country Honduras and is also a pun on the phrase 紅到拉屎 (literally "popular as shit").

Hong and Hsu acted in skits for the SET Taiwan variety show Golden Night Show. He began doing impressions of celebrities and earned a spot on the CTi TV political sketch show Everybody Speaks Nonsenses. He gradually gained recognition for his various characters and impressions on the show.

Proficient in Taiwanese, Hong was often invited as a guest on shows such as Kangsi Coming and 100% Entertainment for Taiwanese topics.

== Personal life ==
He married in 1996, and has a son and a daughter.

== As television host ==
=== Variety shows ===
Channel	Title
CTV	Jacky Go Go Go
CTV	Super Impressions
CTV	Variety Big Brother
CTS	Barrage
CTS	CTS Night Club
SET Taiwan	Golden Night Show
GTV	Master Showdown
CTi Variety	2100 Everybody Speaks Nonsenses
CTi Entertainment	Everybody Speaks Nonsenses II – Hot Pot
CTi Entertainment	Lying Battle
CTi Entertainment	Celebrity Imitated Show
CTi Entertainment	Ah Hong's Hour
CTi Entertainment	Crazy Hot Pot
Star Chinese Channel	Crazy Show
Videoland ONTV	Rookie Boss To Work
Hakka TV	Local Heroes or Village Idiots?

== Filmography ==
=== TV ===
Year	Title	Role
1997	Double Happiness	A-yen
2000	A Traditional Story of Taiwan: Guren Water Lantern	Tsai Shui-sheng
2000	Thirteen birds to Peter and Aunt	Police officer
2000	Legend of Nine Dragons	Master A-huo
2000	A Traditional Story of Taiwan: Beauty 18 Times	Wu Chiu
2003	Just Love	Lin Wang
2003	Love Tornado	Host
2008	Crabfeet	Lin Wen-po
2008	Morning Glory Days	Li Kuo-hui
2008	Mysterious Incredible Terminator	Tao Ying Ming
2009	Most Beloved	Li Wang-lung
2009	Bling Days	Li Jui-huang
2009	Momo Love	Tao Hua's father
2010	Love Buffet	Professor Yeh
2011	Three Runaways	Wu Fa-ta
2011	Boy and Girl	Hei Chih-hsiung
2012	Loves In Penghu	A-hung
2012	The Late Night Stop	Li Yao-hsing
2014	High Heels And A Scalpel	Li Hsin-i
2014	PMAM - Invesigators	Vivi's father
2015	For Better or For Worse	Chen Teng
2016	Miss In Kiss	Hsiang Tung-liu
2016	A-Kuan	Huang Ching-jung
2016	Stand By Me	Yang Yai-sheng
2017	Midnight Diner	Owner
2017	Jojo's World	Chef Ah Wen
2019	The Love Story in Banana Orchard	Kei Chang-yuan
2019	The World Between Us	Liao Niu Shih
2019	Best Interest	Meng-po
2019	Ah-Chin	Ah-Chin (older)
2020	The Victims' Game	Sun Yung-chen
2020	You go! Girls!	Chu Cheng-wei
2021	Golden Years	Hsu Chin-ta
2021	The Making of an Ordinary Woman 2	Yung Po
2021	Gold Leaf	Wan Shui-lai
2021	Moonlit Prodigal Horse	Father
2022	Small and Mighty	Liu Chih-kuang
2022	No Regrets In Life	Yu Chien-kuan
2022	Mom, Don't Do That!	Editor-in-chief
2022	The Amazing Grace of Σ	Glasses
2022	My Tooth Your Love	Chin's father
2022	Oh Marriage	Wu Te-chao
2023	What the Hell Is Love	Lin Fu-chuan
2023	Dark Tide - Unethical Secret	Li-wei's father
2024	Let's Talk About Chu	Chiu Cheng-nan
2024	Taiwanese Opera Family	Incense Leader
2024	U Motherbaker2	Chen I-lang
2024	I Can See You Shine	Yeh's father

=== Film ===
Year	Title	Role
2006	Ice Age: The Meltdown	Fast Tony (Mandarin voice)
2012	Viva Baseball	Po-tzu
2015	OPEN! OPEN!	A-hung
2015	Maverick	8th Precinct Chief
2016	Betelnut Girls	Betelnut Stand Owner
2016	At Cafe 6	Hsiao's father
2020	Your Name Engraved Herein	Military Teacher
2020	Little Big Women	Lin's youngest brother
2021	Till We Meet Again	Horse-Face
2021	Terrorizers	Chen Hung-hui
2023	Miss Shampoo	Boss North

=== Music videos ===
Year	Artist	Song title
2018	Karen Mok	Growing Fond of You
