= Café. Waiting. Love =

- Film poster
- Directed by: Chiang Chin-lin
- Screenplay by: Giddens Ko
- Based on: Café. Waiting. Love by Giddens Ko
- Produced by: Angie Chai; Giddens Ko
- Starring: Vivian Sung; Bruce Hung; Megan Lai; Marcus Chang; Pauline Lan; Lee Luo; Vivian Chow
- Cinematography: Yang Fong-ming
- Edited by: Ian Lin
- Music by: Chris Hou
- Production companies: K4s Motion Studio; VieVision Pictures; Amazing Film Studio; Star Ritz Productions
- Release date: August 15, 2014
- Running time: 120 minutes
- Country: Taiwan
- Language: Mandarin
- Box office: NT$37.1 million (Taipei); HK$9.3 million (Hong Kong)

Café. Waiting. Love (Chinese: 等一個人咖啡; pinyin: Děng yīgè rén kāfēi; lit. 'Waiting For Someone', 'Coffee') is a 2014 Taiwanese romantic comedy film directed by Chiang Chin-lin, adapted from Giddens Ko's novel of the same name. The film marks the first on-screen appearance of Vivian Sung, Bruce Hung, and Marcus Chang.

== Plot ==
Si-ying (Vivian Sung) is a university freshman who works part-time at a café. There, she met A Bu-si (Megan Lai), a professional coffee maker who can make any type of coffee according to a customer's order, the shop's proprietress (Vivian Chow) who is often quiet and alone, seated at a corner of her café most of the time, as well as Ze-Yu (Marcus Chang).

One day, Senior A-Tuo (Bruce Hung), a senior of Si-ying's who's moderately legendary in the university, came to the café with his friends where he met a lesbian who stole his girlfriend - A bu-si, by coincidence. As the friends kept teasing A-Tuo, Si-ying, full of helping and justice heart, helped A-Tuo out of the difficult situation. The two of them eventually became friends after several encounters. Senior A-Tuo is an optimistic person with a happy-go-lucky personality. Besides working part-time at a roadside stall, he also works for Bao Ge (Lee Luo), who was a movie director and now a mediator for gangs, as a cook at his restaurant. There, he got to know Aunt Jin-dao, Bao's wife, (Pauline Lan), and learned to cook a noodle dish from her. After Bao and his wife fell out due to a petty argument, she started up her own dry-cleaning shop which was where Si-ying first met with Aunt Jin-Dao.

Started out as acquaintances, Si-ying and A-Tuo become good friends with each other after hanging out for some time. A-Tuo started having feelings for Si-ying, but Si-ying only treated him as a friend whom she can confess any thinking in her heart openly, as she likes Ze-Yu. Later, Senior A-Tuo went backpacking overseas. It was during this period that Si-Ying realised that A-Tuo is the one whom she has been waiting for all along...

== Cast ==
- Vivian Sung as Si-ying
- Bruce Hung as Senior A-Tuo
- Megan Lai as A Bu-si
- Vivian Chow as Proprietress
- Katie Chen as young proprietress
- Marcus Chang as Ze-yu
- Hong Yan Xiang as young Ze-yu
- Lee Luo as Bao
- Pauline Lan as Aunt Jin-dao
- Yuri Gao as A-zu

=== Cameo ===
- Emerson Tsai as Liao Ying-hung
- Lin Mei-hsiu as Café patron
- Ma Nien-hsien as customer
- Michelle Chen as customer

== Reception ==
It has grossed NT$37.1 million in Taipei and HK$9.3 million in Hong Kong.
