= Emerson Tsai =

Taiwanese actor, television host and singer

- 蔡昌憲
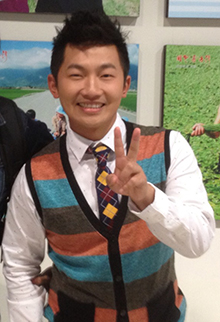
- Tsai in September 2014
- Born: 2 August 1988 (age 38); New Taipei, Taiwan
- Education: Aletheia University (BA)
- Occupations: Actor, television host, singer
- Years active: 2009—present
- Spouse: Vivian (m. 2018)
- Children: 1
- Musical career
- Also known as: Tsai Chang-hsien; Cai Changxian
- Genre: Mandopop
- Instrument: Vocals

Emerson Tsai (Chinese: 蔡昌憲; pinyin: Cài Chāngxiàn; Pe̍h-ōe-jī: Chhòa Chhiong-hiàn; born 2 August 1988) is a Taiwanese actor, television host and singer. He appeared on the third season of singing competition television series Super Idol in 2009, and came in eighth place. In 2010, Tsai made his acting debut in Monga, a gang film directed by Doze Niu. Since then, he has continued to act in both film and television with productions such as You Are the Apple of My Eye (2011), The Fierce Wife Final Episode (2012), Mr. Right Wanted (2014), Blue Sunny Days (2015) and Swimming Battle (2016).

== Personal life ==
Tsai is married to Vivian, an air stewardess. The couple has a son.

== Filmography ==
=== Film ===
Year	English title	Mandarin title	Role	Notes
2010	Monga	艋舺	Hou Chun-sheng (Monkey)	
2011	Night Market Hero	雞排英雄	Seven	
2011	You Are the Apple of My Eye	那些年，我們一起追的女孩	Liao Ying-hung	
2012	Love	愛	Monkey	Cameo
2012	The Fierce Wife Final Episode	犀利人妻最終回：幸福男·不難	A-jen	Short film
2013	To My Dear Granny	親愛的奶奶	Alibaba	
2014	Café. Waiting. Love	等一個人咖啡	Liao Ying-hung	Cameo
2015	Lion Dancing 2	鐵獅玉玲瓏2	Tseng Pai-mu	
2016	Rookie Chef	神廚	Chia Ta-tan	
2016	Like Life	人生按個讚	Kitchen God	
2016	The Big Power	大顯神威	Hsiang Po-hsi	
2017	Mon Mon Mon Monsters	報告老師！怪怪怪怪物！	Student on bus	Cameo
2017	All Because of Love	痴情男子漢	Chen Yu-li (young)	Cameo appearance
2021	The Sadness	哭悲	Warren Liu	
2021	Till We Meet Again	月老	Aaron's elementary school classmate	Cameo
2023	Miss Shampoo	請問，還有哪裡需要加強	Fishy	

=== Television series ===
Year	English title	Mandarin title	Role	Notes
2011	In Time with You	我可能不會愛你	Gopher	
2011	Ji Gong	戲說台灣之濟公十八嫁	Young man	Cameo
2012	Father's Wish	阿爸的願望	Chen Tien-cheng	
2012	The Heart of Woman	天下女人心	A-chang	Cameo
2014	The X-Dormitory	終極X宿舍	Jen Pang-kuang	
2014	Mr. Right Wanted	徵婚啟事	Chang Chia-chiang	
2014	You Light Up My Star	你照亮我星球	Golden Horse Awards red carpet host	Episode 2
2015	Blue Sunny Days	藍色艷陽天	Chen Wen-feng	
2015	Desire Club	PMAM之慾望俱樂部	A-ko	Episode 37
2016	Swimming Battle	飛魚高校生	Chen Chia-lo	
2019	Coolie			
2025	Hotel Saltwater	鹽水大飯店	Jen-huang	

=== Variety show ===
Year	English title	Mandarin title	Notes
2009–2014	Stories in Taiwan	在台灣的故事	Host
2010–2017	Super Red	超級紅人榜	Host
2012	She-ly Women	女人好犀利	Host
2013–2014	Super M	金牌麥克風	Host
2015	iWalker	愛玩客	Host; 1 episode

=== Event ===
Year	English title	Mandarin title	Notes
2012	Behind-the-Scenes of Super Star 2012	2012超級巨星紅白藝能大賞-後台直擊	Host
2012	49th Golden Horse Awards	第49屆金馬獎-星光大道	Red carpet host

== Discography ==
=== Singles ===
Year	Title	Notes
2011	"Bei Gang Ma Zu Zui Teng Wo 北港媽祖最疼我"	
2011	"Never Turning Back 永遠不回頭"	You Are the Apple of My Eye soundtrack
2011	"Friends of Common Friends 普通朋友的朋友"	In Time with You soundtrack
2014	"Pitcher's Dream 投手夢"	Compilation album 2K14 Baseball Songs
2014	"Baseball Songs (Elder Version) 老人棒棒歌"	Compilation album 2K14 Baseball Songs

== Awards and nominations ==
Year	Award	Category	Nominated work	Result
2023	58th Golden Bell Awards	Best Leading Actor in a Television Series	Oxcart Trails	Nominated
