= Mon Mon Mon Monsters =

- Theatrical release poster
- Chinese: 報告老師！怪怪怪怪物！
- Hanyu Pinyin: Bào Gào Lǎo Shī ! Guài Guài Guài Guài Wù !
- Directed by: Giddens Ko
- Written by: Giddens Ko
- Produced by: Angie Chai; Giddens Ko
- Starring: Deng Yukai; Kent Tsai; Carolyn Chen; Eugenie Liu; Lin Pei Hsin
- Cinematography: Patrick Chou
- Edited by: Li Nien Hsiu
- Music by: Chris Hou
- Production company: Star Ritz International Entertainment
- Distributed by: Vie Vision Pictures
- Release dates: April 23, 2017 (HKIFF); July 28, 2017 (Taiwan)
- Running time: 112 minutes
- Country: Taiwan
- Language: Mandarin
- Budget: NT$100 million
- Box office: NT$41.8 million (Taiwan)

Mon Mon Mon Monsters is a 2017 Taiwanese horror-comedy film written, directed and co-produced by Giddens Ko. It premiered as the closing film for the 41st Hong Kong International Film Festival in April 2017, and was released in theaters on July 28, 2017.

Unjustly accused of stealing money, Lin Shuwei is assigned to do community service alongside the bullies from class. As the gang of bullies progressively accept him as one of their own, Lin partakes in their misdeeds to seek their approval. During a night out, the group stumble upon a pair of flesh-eating female ghouls and capture one of them; they begin a sadistic game, which ultimately leads to disastrous consequences.

Ko originally intended for the film to be a mockumentary shot entirely on iPhone. This idea, however, was eventually disregarded as the project evolved into a more personal work inspired in part by the backlash the director was receiving at the time for a widely publicized affair. While discussing his inspiration, Ko has stated: "Maybe millions of Taiwanese people hated me, so I wanted to shoot a horror movie to scare everybody, to express my hate."

== Plot ==
Lin Shuwei is a meek, straight-A student with no friends who gets harassed by his classmates. He has recently been framed of stealing the class funds, and is further humiliated in front of the class by a gang of bullies, consisting of leader Tuan Renhao, his girlfriend Wu Sihua, and Liao Kuoheng and Yeh Weichu. Suspecting them to be the actual thieves, Lin confronts them at their hideout at the school's abandoned swimming pool's maintenance room. Renhao mockingly confesses to his crime, stating that he needed the money to tune Kuo Feng's motorcycle scooter. Sihua then puts Lin's hand on her breast, making it appear as if he did so on his own free will and framing him as a pervert, with the bullies taking a picture of the scene and spreading it around the school, further degrading Lin's reputation. Lin is then restrained by the neck with an animal control pole, threatened by Renhao with corneal perforation from a wall dart, and released.

Expecting to be overpowered, Lin used his phone to audio record the entire encounter conversation with the bullies. However, his teacher, Ms. Lee, points out that if the bullies were accused of the crime, the bullying would only get much worse. She then encourages Lin to accept the blame for the crime, and assigns the three male bullies to work with him, under the guise of them being the class's most popular individuals and with the intention of making the four boys closer. The four are told to perform community service for the elderly, by feeding them. However, the bullies abuse the elders instead, painting their faces and making them "chicken fight" each other. Initially disturbed by the bullies' actions, Lin participates and becomes visibly happy as he has been accepted and is now part of the gang.

At the end of their day, they come across an elderly war veteran of the National Revolutionary Army's 29th Broadswords unit suffering from dementia. They discover a locked box, and believe it to be filled with riches plundered from China, during the Nationalist withdrawal. They agree to return at night, to break open and steal the contents of the box. Upon their return, they are unable to open the box, and instead decide to take it back to the hideout. Unbeknownst to them however, a pair of female flesh-eating ghouls have made their home in the elderly home's elevator shaft, preying on both the mostly forgotten residents and the homeless. As the bullies start to leave, they come across the ghouls feasting on one of the elders. The older of the two flees into the shaft, while the younger attempts to pursue them. Terrified, the boys run out of the building, only to witness the younger ghoul get struck by a vehicle on the street. The driver flees the scene and the boys investigate the seemingly dead ghoul. When the ghoul tries to attack Kuofeng, Renhao knocks her out with a shovel. Unable to leave the ghoul there, as there is a traffic camera pointed at the scene, the bullies take the ghoul back to the hideout, believing her to be dead. Meanwhile, the elder ghoul mourns the disappearance of her sibling.

That morning, the bullies search the box but find nothing but medals and old photos. The younger ghoul reawakens and exhibits supernatural capabilities, such as regeneration, and the ability to climb on walls. As the ghoul confronts the boys, it accidentally steps in a ray of sunlight and its foot is burned by the sun's touch. The bullies immediately capitalize on this weakness, using a portrait of Sun Yat-sen to subdue the ghoul, trapping her under a box. They eventually tie the ghoul to a pillar in the center of the room using chains. Si Hua is informed of the monster's presence, and the gang discover the monster's flesh-eating disposition. Ren Hao exults in having the monster as a captive, stating that since it is not a human, they can do anything they want to it. Lin meanwhile, sympathizes with the ghoul, stating to her that the bullies will probably let her go after they've had their fun. Renhao extracts several of the monster's teeth and blood, with Sihua sanitizing and using them as part of her bracelet. The boys further torture the ghoul, drilling a plate to cover her mouth and applying more chains and locks to her mouth.

Back at the elderly home, the war veteran, traumatized by the abduction of his compatriots, dons his old uniform and with broadsword in hand, begins singing an army song (中國的駱駝), inviting the ghoul to find him. The ghoul is attracted by the noise, and confronts the veteran, who identifies himself as Superior Private Li Rengfeng. Though briefly interrupted by a neighbor, who chastises the veteran for his singing in the middle of the night, the ghoul and the old soldier clash, which results in the ghoul being ejected from the fourth-floor window, still alive but with her right arm nearly completely severed. The veteran, unscathed in the clash, smiles and dies whilst still standing.

Back at the maintenance room, the bullies continue to torment their captive monster. After using clumsy attempts at religious exorcism and wrapping the monster in scripture, Ren Hao instructs Lin to thank the monster, implying that the latter would have been the one tied to the pillar and tormented had the ghoul not been there. Attempting to find out more about their monster, the bullies take blood samples from the creature, and study it in the school's lab, noting the lack of any red blood cells and the presence of eggs or spores on the monster's blackened cells, and that contact with normal blood cells causes the blackened cells to "infect" the blood cells, turning them black as well. They also notice that continuous contact with the sun causes the blackened cells to spontaneously combust. Lin does some research on the ghouls, identifying the younger monster as Lee Shiu Jen who went missing in 1985, alongside her sister, known as the Voodoo Master. From the news article Lin finds, it appears that the two went missing when they killed their parents, with the Voodoo Master using the dark arts to conjure a poison involving female menstruation, with the effects having backfired spectacularly as seen by the two girls' current state.

Lin prints out the information he finds, and presents it to Renhao, stating that the ghouls are indeed human. Ren Hao tosses aside the information, stating that no matter what the ghoul was before, its current state is that of a monster. Lin then asks what the purpose of keeping the monster is, and states that the monster would probably starve soon. The other bullies then decide on using Lin as a living blood bag to keep the monster alive. They further torment the monster by spraying blood at her, and terrorizing the ghoul by putting its head in a bird cage and dancing around it wearing face paint.

The next day, one of Lin's classmates tampers with his chair, causing it to collapse when he sits down. Contrary to his past behavior where he would congratulate the prankster and laugh along, Ren Hao beats the perpetrator to the point of hospitalization, in front of the entire class and Ms. Lee. Renhao justifies this, stating that only he would be the one that could beat Lin. During the disciplinary meeting after the event, Ms. Lee, a devout Buddhist, attempts to correct Ren Hao's behavior with spiritual guidance. Infuriated at the mockery Ren Hao makes of her attempts, she slap him repeatedly, and humiliates him by mentioning his family circumstances, with his alleged father being a criminal, and his mother being a prostitute. Renhao is thrown into a rage, and takes out his anger on the ghoul, beating her severely with a bat. After noticing the monster's blood combusting, he alongside the rest of the bullies poisons Ms. Lee's drink with the monster's blood. During a basketball game, several hours after drinking the monster's blood, Ms. Lee appears to have a stomachache and having something run though her left eye. Soon after her attempts to get to the medical room, Ms. Lee bleeds out black blood from her anus and spontaneously combusts upon contact with the sun. Video of this event is shown on the news, which the older ghoul notices, along with the school's uniform. At a drinking party to celebrate the death of their teacher, Lin is offered several drinks by the bullies, but declines them out of fear of what happened to Ms. Lee. Out of spite, Sihua drinks Lin's drink, while Renhao states to Lin that he could kill him "in a million ways", thus poisoning him would be pointless. Sihua then expresses her exasperation at Lin's continued involvement with the group, stating that he was the only one who didn't want to see the monster die, and that he could have released the monster at any time, mocking him for being meaningless as he wanted to be "the good guy" but never possessing any courage to actually do anything. Lin later takes out his anger on a mentally challenged convenience store clerk, wrecking the store and stealing his money.

The older ghoul begins systematically hunting down individuals wearing the school's uniform, regardless of their involvement with her sister's predicament. Her attacks include ambushing a student getting a drink at a vending machine, and slaughtering a bus full of students. Sihua is on the bus at the time and manages to take a picture of the monster before the ghoul notices Si Hua's bracelet with her sister's teeth on it, and gruesomely kills her. In grief, Renhao pulls out hundreds of the younger monster's teeth. The monster also attacks an after-school program, slaughtering dozens of students, but sparing a pair of sisters. The remaining bullies decide to eliminate the older monster, using her sister as bait. Ren Hao plans to lock both monsters in the maintenance room, then pour gasoline in through the sprinklers and throwing a match down the ventilation pipe. Ren Hao and Kuofeng would be the ones pouring and igniting the gasoline, while Weizhu would be the lookout and Lin would be the one locking both monsters in. Unbeknownst to the bullies, Lin unscrews one of the window coverings, wanting the monsters to escape the trap, stating to the younger ghoul that he wants to at least do one thing right in his life.

Lured to the war veteran's room by the sound of her sister's cries, the monster follows arrows leading to the pool during the night. Before the monster reaches the pool, Lin asks Weizhu the reason they had framed him in the first place. Wei Zhu simply replies that "it was fun". Realizing that it was likely he would receive similar treatment to the monster after their escape, Lin sabotages the plan by calling Weizhu's phone when the monster shows up, causing the monster to corner and kill the latter. Lin then locks himself inside the maintenance room, leaving Kuofeng and Renhao outside to face the elder monster. Lin disregards Renhao's pleas to let him in by stating that one day, the bullies would likely torture him to death, and that this was the only way that he would be able to kill them off. The older monster kills Kuo Feng after he charges her with a hatchet, and then kills Renhao outside the maintenance room door. Lin retreats inside the room as the monster breaks down the door. Despite his pleas for the monster to spare him, the monster throws him around the room.

In an act of desperation, Lin opens the window that he had previously unscrewed, with the sun rising at exactly the same time. The beam of light strikes the younger ghoul, who immediately begins burning from its effects and is unable to escape it due to the restraints. The older sister frantically shields the younger sister and tries to tear the chains off, instead destroying her fingers in the process. With both of them beginning to combust, the older sister embraces the younger sister, dying in each other's arms. Lin leaves the maintenance hall and the bodies of the bullies behind in a daze.

Later that day, Lin is assigned to lunch duty, being assigned to take care of the classes' soup container. It is shown that despite the bullies' deaths, the rest of the class still torments him. During lunch, he throws out the soup of another bullied student who had pitied him before, telling her that she wasn't "one of them". It is then revealed that Lin had kept the rest of the vial used to poison Ms. Lee, and had dumped the rest of it into the soup container, infecting everyone else in the class, including himself. He then stands up, walks out the door of the classroom and screams as he combusts, with his classmates burning in the background.

== Cast ==
- Deng Yu Kai as Lin Shuwei
- Kent Tsai as Tuan Renhao
- Eugenie Liu as Older monster
- Lin Pei Hsin as Younger monster (Lee Shiu Jen)
- Carolyn Chen as Ms. Lee
- James Lai as Liao Kuofeng
- Tao Meng as Yeh Weichu
- Bonnie Liang as Wu Sihua

=== Cameo appearance ===
- Kai Ko as Student on bus
- Vivian Sung as Student on bus
- Emerson Tsai as Student on bus
- Phil Hou as Student on bus
- Bruce Hung as Student at vending machine

== Soundtrack ==
=== Promotional song ===
No.	Title	Writer(s)	Performer	Length
1.	"World's End Alarm 末日鬧鐘"	Giddens Ko, Uplee (831) 八三夭	831	03:34

== Reception ==
=== Critical reception ===
On the review aggregator website Rotten Tomatoes, 79% of 14 critics' reviews are positive, with an average rating of 6.7/10.

=== Awards and nominations ===
Award ceremony	Category	Recipients	Result
21st Bucheon International Fantastic Film Festival	NH Audience Award	Mon Mon Mon Monsters	Won
54th Golden Horse Awards	Best Visual Effects	Pao Cheng-hsun and Huang Mei-cing	Nominated
54th Golden Horse Awards	Best Sound Effects	Tu Duu-chih and Wu Shu-yao	Won
