= Till We Meet Again (2021 film) =

2021 Taiwanese romantic fantasy film

- Official poster
- Chinese: 月老
- Literal meaning: Old Person of the Moon
- Hanyu Pinyin: Yuè Lǎo
- Directed by: Giddens Ko
- Written by: Giddens Ko
- Based on: Yue Lao by Giddens Ko
- Produced by: Molly Fang; Paul D. Kim
- Starring: Kai Ko; Gingle Wang; Vivian Sung; Umin Boya
- Cinematography: Patrick Chou
- Edited by: Kao Ming-Sheng; Wang Ching-Chiao
- Music by: Chris Hou
- Production company: Machi Xcelsior Studios
- Distributed by: Machi Xcelsior Studios (Taiwan); CBI Pictures (Indonesia); Clover Films (World-wide); Golden Screen Cinemas (Malaysia); Golden Village Pictures (Singapore); Hive Media (South Korea); Intercontinental Film Distributors (HK) (Hong Kong)
- Release dates: July 8, 2021 (Bucheon); November 24, 2021 (Taiwan); April 2, 2022 (Disney+)
- Running time: 128 minutes
- Country: Taiwan
- Language: Mandarin
- Budget: $3.5 million
- Box office: Taiwan: NT$250,000,000; Hong Kong: US$1,557,547; United Kingdom: US$9,571; South Korea: US$147,454

Till We Meet Again (Chinese: 月老; pinyin: Yuèlǎo; Pe̍h-ōe-jī: Goa̍t-ló; lit. 'Old man [under] the moon', see Yue Lao; formerly known as Sushi Restaurant Legend) is a 2021 Taiwanese romantic fantasy comedy film, based on the novel of the same name by Giddens Ko. Directed and written by Giddens Ko, and starring Kai Ko, Gingle Wang, Vivian Sung and Umin Boya, it had its premiere at 25th Bucheon International Fantastic Film Festival as opening film on 8 July 2021, and was released theatrically on November 24, 2021, in Taiwan. It is also available for streaming on Disney+ in selected regions on April 2, 2022.

== Plot ==
Killed by lightning, Ah Lun arrives at the underworld with no memories. He is given 2 choices: reincarnate as a snail, or take up a priesthood to accumulate virtuous virtues so that he can reincarnate as a human being.

Ah Lun decides to try to become a Yue Lao, a God of love. Teamed up with Pinky, a girl with an explosive personality, both of them manage to overcome their dislike for one another and pass the final test to become a Yue Lao.

Ah Lun and Pinky go back to the living world to matchmake people and gain virtues. One day, Ah Lun's memories of his current life returns as he bumps into his faithful dog Ah Lu and the love of his life, Xiaomi. As a Yue Lao, Ah Lun has to help Xiaomi find her match, but he soon finds out that every red thread tied to Xiaomi's hands just seemingly burns away. This gains the attention of other Yue Laos and they tried to tie thousands of different threads to Xiaomi to no avail.

Unable to contain her frustration any further, Xiaomi reveals that she has been able to see Ah Lun the entire time as her third eye awakened after her brush with death, and expresses that she does not want to be matchmade with anyone else because she only loves him. Ah Lun and Xiaomi reunite and start spending time together everyday, irking Pinky as she is falling for Ah Lun herself as well.

At the same time, a vengeful spirit, Ghost Head, has escaped from the underworld to the living world to take revenge on his comrades who betrayed him 500 years ago. Ghost Head and his comrades were once bandits who went through thick and thin together, until his comrades killed him in exchange to be spared by officials. Since then, his comrades have reincarnated multiple times while Ghost Head served as Horse Face, an underworld guard, until his resentment got better of him, getting him banished to hell.

While Ah Lun was still excited about reuniting with Xiaomi, Ghost Head finds Xiaomi and recognizes her as one of his comrades in her past life and tries to kill her. Ah Lun fights off Ghost Head but is soon overwhelmed by the powerful spirit but Horse Face arrives just in time and chases Ghost Head away.

Fed up and jealous, Pinky goes to the underworld officials to rat on Ah Lun and Xiaomi's forbidden relationship. Pinky and Ah Lun are then stripped of their Yue Lao titles and imprisoned. Pinky is remorseful of her actions and Ah Lun forgives her because he is aware of how his actions implicate and hurt Pinky.

Xiaomi notices Ah Lun's disappearance and waits for him at his memorial spot. Ah Lu who has been battling cancer, passes away in Xiaomi's arms, not before Xiaomi telling it to find Ah Lun in the underworld. Not long after, Ghost Head appears and start hurting Xiaomi. Xiaomi is spared from getting her neck snapped when Bull Head and Horse Face show up and fight off Ghost Head.

Back in the underworld, Ah Lun and Pinky escape imprisonment with help from Ah Lu, who informs them that Xiaomi is in danger. By the time they arrive, Xiaomi's soul is starting to evaporate away while Bull Head and Horse Face are losing the fight. Angered, Ah Lun tries to help with the fight to no avail. Suddenly, Ah Lun remembers being saved by Ghost Head during his past life as a cicada and he thanks Ghost Head for it. His gratitude brings back Ghost Head's humanity and stopped him from turning into a demon.

To save Xiaomi's soul, Ah Lun digs out a piece of thread from his heart hoping to find a match for Xiaomi as a person cannot die before they meet their match. Pinky finds a match just in time for Xiaomi to be saved. Just before Ah Lun turns into a ball of light and joins the other souls to reincarnate, he remembers his previous life with Xiaomi, where both of them agreed to find each other again in their next life.

After some time, Pinky has accumulated enough virtues to be reincarnated as a human. She asks for a heart-shaped birthmark for her reincarnated self and her colleagues to matchmake her with Ah Lun if they come across the 2 of them.

Xiaomi is in a vet clinic with her match planning for a trip to see the Aurora Borealis and there is a young boy and girl bickering at the waiting area. The boy catches Xiaomi's attention when he says Ah Lun's favorite catchphrase, and Xiaomi smiles. The boy and girl continue bickering when it is revealed that the girl has a heart-shaped birthmark and both children are connected by an invisible red thread.

== Cast ==
- Kai Ko as Alan Shi Xiao Lun/Ah Lun
- Gingle Wang as Huang Wenzi/Pinky
- Vivian Sung as Hong Jing Qing/Xiao Mi
- Umin Boya as Guitoucheng/Ghost Head
- Honduras as Horse Face
- Joelle Lu as Bull Head
- Hou Yan Xi as Member of Yue Lao Group
- Chen Yu as Member of Yue Lao Group
- Chang Tsai Hsing as Member of Yue Lao Group
- Chen Zhao Fei as Member of Yue Lao Group
- Emerson Tsai as Aaron's elementary school classmate
- June Tsai as Grim reaper
- Chiago Liu as Video anchor
- Bruce Hung as Pinky's ex-boyfriend
- Eugenie Liu as Little horse thief
- Kent Tsai as Locomotive owner
- Deng Yu Kai as Locomotive owner's friend
- Marcus Chang as Xiao Mi's classmate
- Alberto Parron as foreigner

== Release ==
Till We Meet Again premiered on July 8, 2021, as the opening film of the 25th Bucheon International Fantastic Film Festival in South Korea. It was also selected for the opening film of the Taipei Film Festival and screened on September 23, 2021, and the Austin Fantasy Film Festival in Texas. Clover Films of Singapore partnered with Taiwan's Machi Xcelsior Studios and handled the worldwide theatrical releases (except Taiwan and South Korea) for the film. Whereas Hive Filmworks handled the theatrical rights in Korea.

== Reception ==
James Marsh of South China Morning Post gave 4 stars out of 5, and wrote, "With a film that is by turns funny, scary, tragic and achingly romantic, Ko [writer and director] proves once again his unique understanding of the younger generation; having articulated their passions and anxieties on the page, he has now vividly realising them on the big screen." Marsh further stated, "the film is slick, as entertaining and accessible for international audiences as for Ko’s devoted fans."

=== Accolades ===
Award	Year	Category	Recipient(s)	Result	Ref.
Golden Horse Awards	2021	Best Feature Film	Till We Meet Again	Nominated	
Golden Horse Awards	2021	Best Supporting Actor	Umin Boya	Nominated	
Golden Horse Awards	2021	Best Adapted Screenplay	Giddens Ko	Nominated	
Golden Horse Awards	2021	Best Cinematography	Chou Yi-hsien	Nominated	
Golden Horse Awards	2021	Best Visual Effects	ArChin Yen	Nominated	
Golden Horse Awards	2021	Best Art Direction	Wang Chih-cheng	Nominated	
Golden Horse Awards	2021	Best Makeup & Costume Design	Hsien-chia	Won	
Golden Horse Awards	2021	Best Action Choreography	Gino Yang	Nominated	
Golden Horse Awards	2021	Best Original Film Score	Chris Hou	Nominated	
Golden Horse Awards	2021	Best Original Film Score	Chris Hou	Nominated	
Golden Horse Awards	2021	Best Original Film Song	"Red Scarf" by WeiBird, JerryC	Nominated	
Golden Horse Awards	2021	Best Sound Effects	R.T KAO, Chu Shih-yi	Won	
Taipei Film Awards	2022	Best Feature Film	Till We Meet Again	Nominated	
Taipei Film Awards	2022	Best Director	Giddens Ko	Won	
Taipei Film Awards	2022	Best Screenplay	Giddens Ko	Nominated	
Taipei Film Awards	2022	Best Actor	Kai Ko	Won	
Taipei Film Awards	2022	Best Supporting Actor	Umin Boya	Nominated	
Taipei Film Awards	2022	Best Art Design	Wang Zhicheng	Nominated	
Taipei Film Awards	2022	Best Styling	Lin Xinyi	Nominated	
Taipei Film Awards	2022	Best Sound Design	Gao Weiyan, Zhu Shiyi	Nominated	
Taipei Film Awards	2022	Best Visual Effects	Yan Zhenqin , Gangfeng Creative Image Co., Ltd.	Won	
Taipei Film Awards	2022	Best Soundtrack	Hou Zhijian	Nominated	
Taipei Film Awards	2022	Best Outstanding Technology	Special effects makeup: Xiao Baichen, Liu Xianjia	Nominated	
Hong Kong Film Awards	2022	Best Asian Chinese Language Film	Till We Meet Again	Nominated	
