= Bruce Hung =

Taiwanese actor (born 1990)

- 禾浩辰
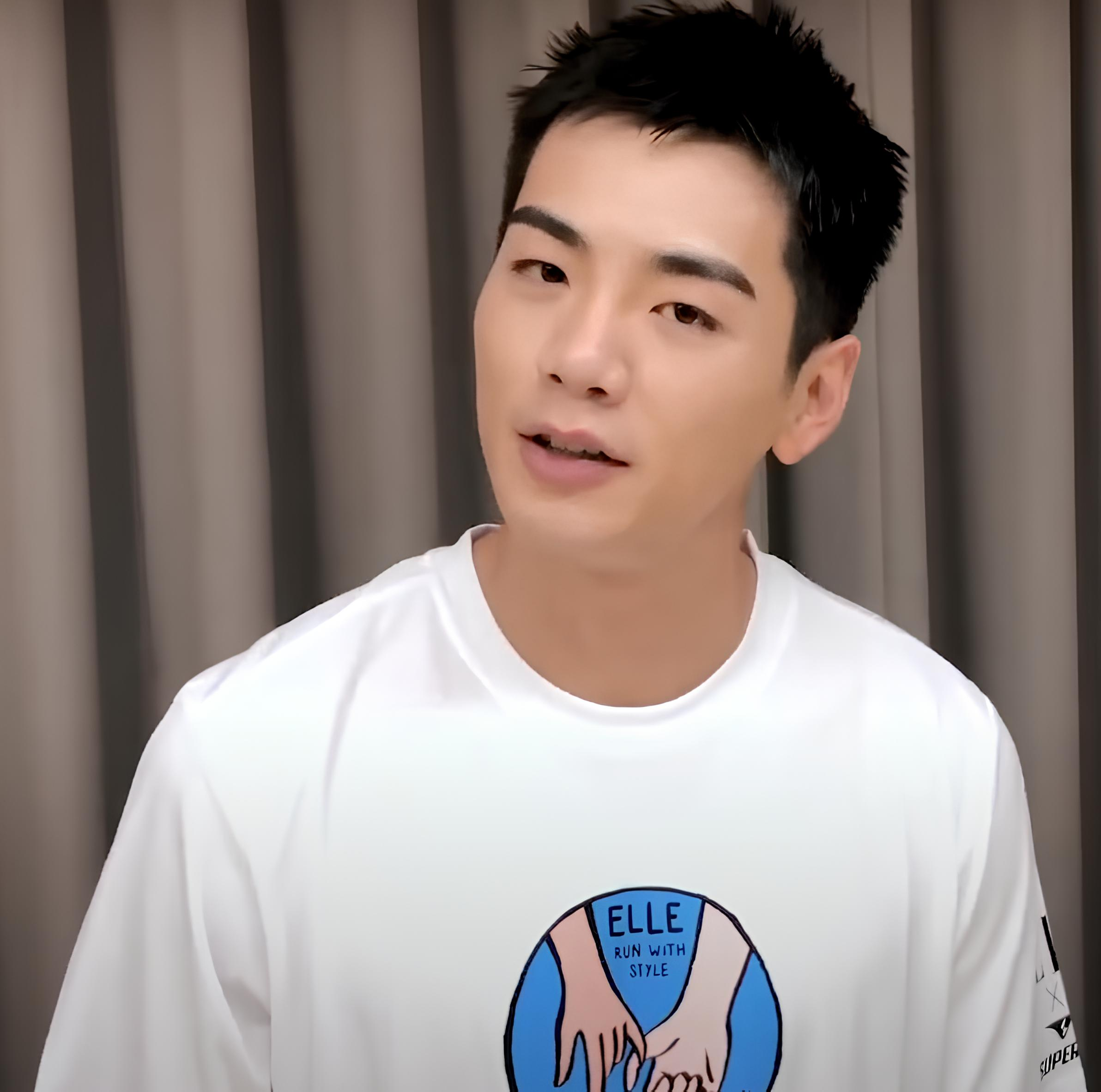
- Hung in 2020
- Born: Hung Chih-han (洪奇翰); 7 September 1990 (age 35); Kaohsiung, Taiwan
- Other names: 布魯斯 (Pe̍h-ōe-jī: Pò͘-ló͘-su; pinyin: Bùlǔsī)
- Education: National University of Tainan
- Occupation: Actor
- Years active: 2014–present
- Notable work: Café. Waiting. Love

Bruce Hung (Chinese: 禾浩辰; pinyin: Hé Hàochén; Pe̍h-ōe-jī: Hô Hō-sîn; born 7 September 1990) is a Taiwanese actor. He is known for his starring role in the 2014 film Café. Waiting. Love.

== Filmography ==
=== Film ===
Year	Title	Role	Notes
2014	Café. Waiting. Love	Ah Tuo	
2015	Les Aventures d'Anthony	Pierre	
2015	When Miracle Meets Math	Qiu Petar	
2015	Running Hunter	Blue	A short film about depression prevention
2016	Like Life	Wang Guo Liang	
2016	Rookie Chef	Wu Kuai Ji	
2017	Mon Mon Mon Monsters	Student at vending machine	Cameo
2017	Meant to be	Ji Jia Shu	Main role
2018	How To Train Our Dragon	Student	
2018	More than Blue	Bang	Special appearance
2020	Get the Hell Out	Wang You Wei	Main Role
2020	First Love	Cheng Da Ye	
2021	Kidnapped Soul	Luo Jia Chiang	
2021	Till We Meet Again	Pinky's ex-boyfriend	
2023	Miss Shampoo	Cheng Hsu-hsiang	

=== Television ===
Year	Title	Role
2015	Happy Together	Wang Bo Han
2016	Metro of Love	Xiao Gao
2016	A Good Day	Jiang Xin Yuan
2018	The Ex-Man	
2019	Hello Again!	Yang Zi Hao
2019	Young Blood	Wei Ya Nei
2020	Mother to Be	Du Bo Qian
2020	Futmalls.com	Li Zhong Wei
2021	PTS Original: Cuillere	Sung Ta Yan
2022	49 Days With a Merman	Li Ren Yu
2022	Women in Taipei	You Han Zong
2022	Fairy in the House	Ling Chen Xi
2023	Lovely Villain	Jiang Zhengming
2023	Best Interest Season 2: Decisive Interest	Jiang Zhiqian
2023	Best Interest Season 3: Ultimate Interest	Jiang Zhiqian
2024	Let's Talk About Chu	Mr. H
2024	M Mission	A Chang

=== Reality shows ===
Year	Title	Chinese title	Note	Ref.
2019	Super Penguin League; Season:2	超级企鹅联盟 Super3	Player; Live Basketball Competition	
