= Giddens Ko =

Taiwanese writer and director

Ko Ching-teng
- 柯景騰
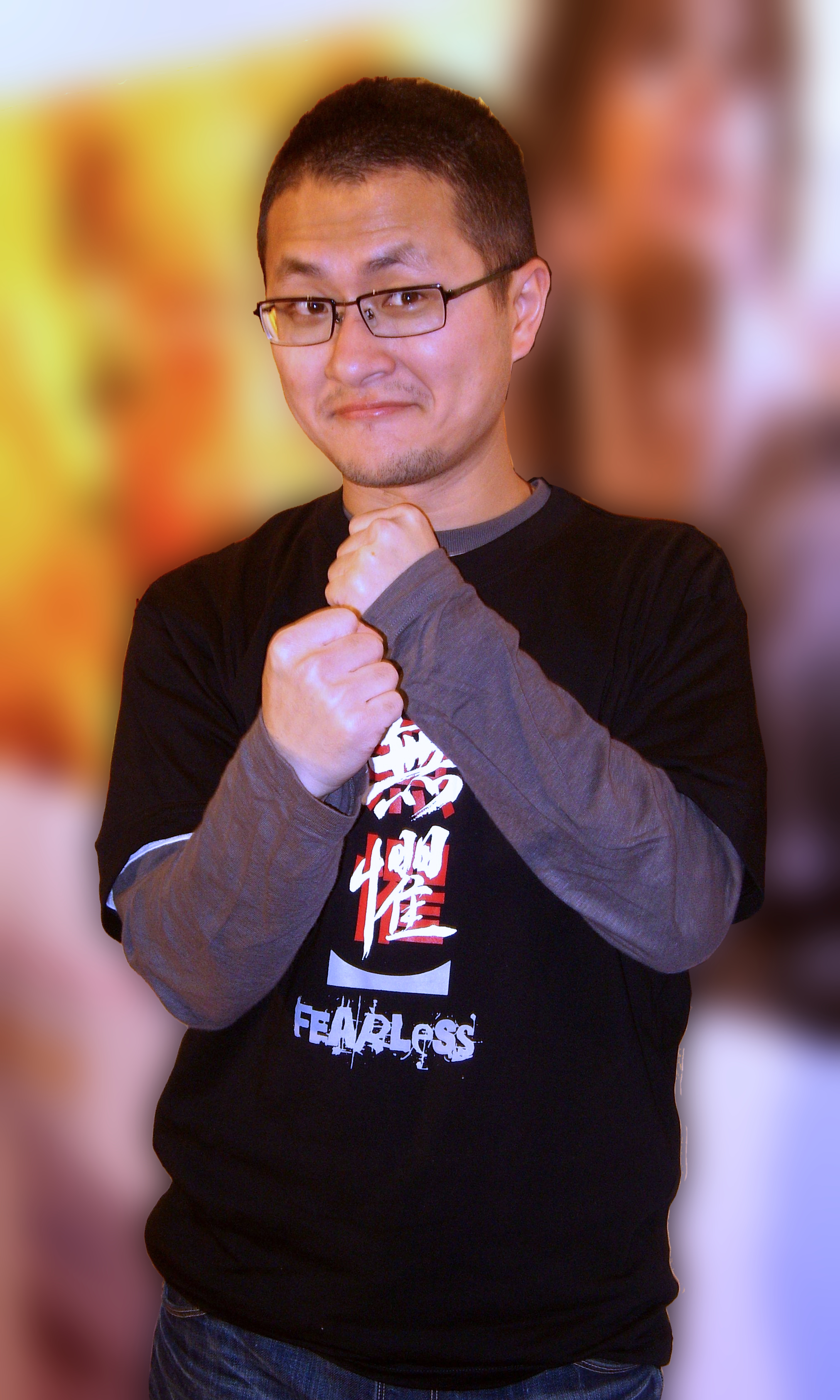
- Ko in 2008
- Born: 25 August 1978 (age 48); Changhua County, Taiwan
- Education: National Chiao Tung University (BS); Tunghai University (MSS)
- Occupations: Novelist; film director; screenwriter; film producer
- Spouse: Chou Ting-yu (m. 2017)
- Partner: Hsiao-nei (2005–2014)
- Children: 2
- Writing career
- Pen name: Nine Knives (九把刀)
- Language: Mandarin
- Years active: 1999–present
- Genres: Horror; science fiction; romance
- Notable works: You Are the Apple of My Eye; Café. Waiting. Love; The Tenants Downstairs
- Website: www.giddens.tw/blog

Ko Ching-teng (traditional Chinese: 柯景騰; simplified Chinese: 柯景腾; pinyin: Kē Jǐngténg; Pe̍h-ōe-jī: Koa Kéng-thêng; born 25 August 1978), also known by his English name Giddens Ko, is a Taiwanese novelist and filmmaker. He has published more than 60 books, many of which have been adapted as films. He writes under the pseudonym of "Nine Knives" (九把刀; Jiǔ bǎ dāo; Kiú Pá To).

== Early life and education ==
Ko was born on 25 August 1978 in Changhua County, Taiwan. He was the second of three sons to parents who owned a pharmacy.

Ko discovered his love of writing when he penned a story as part of his university application. He graduated from National Chiao Tung University with a Bachelor of Science (B.S.) in management science and earned a Master of Social Science (M.S.S.) from Tunghai University.

== Career ==
=== Early period: establishing reputation as a novelist ===
He started writing fiction in 1999, and posted most of his first works on the Internet. Ko struggled through the first five years of his writing career, before branching out into multiple genres, namely horror, science fiction, and romance. He writes 5000 words daily, and at his peak writing pace published one book per month for 14 consecutive months. This set of work helped Ko's popularity rise in Taiwan. Ko has compared himself favorably to Louis Cha, Gu Long, and Ni Kuang.

==== Pen name ====
"Jiubadao" was originally a song written by Ko as a senior high school student. The song's title stuck as a nickname when a tutor spotted students passing notes signed by Jiubadao and asked who he was. Classmates revealed Jiubadao to be Ko and he used the nickname as a pseudonym after graduating college.

=== Directing films ===
In 2008, Ko directed the film L-O-V-E, along with Vincent Fang, Chen Yi-xian and Mickey Huang. In 2010, Ko directed the film You Are the Apple of My Eye, based on his book The Girl We Chased Together in Those Years. In 2011, Ko adapted his "Killer" series into the film The Killer Who Never Kills. He produced a documentary focusing on Taiwan's animal shelters in 2012, titled Twelve Nights. In 2014, another of Ko's books was adapted into the film Café. Waiting. Love. The film adaptation of another of Ko's books, Kung Fu, was originally set to be released in 2014, but its release date was pushed back to 2015. In September 2015, Ko announced another book–to–film adaption, The Tenants Downstairs, was to be released in 2016.

In 2012, Ko notified Apple Inc. that some approved applications on the company's iOS platform were accessing pirated versions of his books. Apple initially refused to pull the apps, as the company was unsure about Ko's publisher having proper authorization to contact them. Ko traveled to Hong Kong to file a complaint in person before the matter was resolved with the removal of the apps. On 9 October 2012, Ko was chosen as one of "Ten Outstanding Young People of Taiwan" by the Junior Chamber International Taiwan.

In 2017, Ko directed the high school horror-comedy film Mon Mon Mon Monsters. Ko originally intended for the film to be a mockumentary shot entirely on iPhone. This idea, however, was eventually disregarded as the project evolved into a more personal work inspired in part by the negative publicity the director was receiving at the time for his affair with Chou.

Ko's film Miss Shampoo, adapted from his 2010 novel Precisely Out of Control, premiered at the 2023 Taipei Film Festival.

== Personal life ==
=== Family ===
In October 2014, Ko admitted to cheating on his girlfriend of nine years, Hsiao-nei, with television reporter Chou Ting-yu. In early May 2015, Ko confirmed that his relationship with Hsiao-nei had ended. Ko and Chou began dating in March 2016; they married in late 2017. On 4 April 2020, Ko announced the birth of their first child. Ko and his wife had their second child on 14 July 2022.

=== Political views ===
In October 2014, it was reported that Beijing had ordered works by Ko removed from shelves in China. A few weeks previously, Ko had shaved his head to show solidarity for Occupy Central with Love and Peace, the organization that started the 2014 Hong Kong protests.

== Filmography ==
Year	Title	Role	Notes	Ref.
2007	Full Count 愛情兩好三壞	Writer	Television series	
2009	L-O-V-E 愛到底	Director, writer, actor	Segment "San sheng you xing"	
2011	The Killer Who Never Kills 殺手歐陽盆栽	Original story		
2011	You Are the Apple of My Eye	Director, writer, actor		
2013	Machi Action 變身	Co-writer		
2013	Twelve Nights 十二夜	Producer	Documentary	
2013	Kiss Me Mom! 媽，親一下！	Original story	Television series	
2014	Café. Waiting. Love	Producer, writer		
2015	Kung Fu 功夫	Director, writer, original story		
2016	The Tenants Downstairs	Writer		
2017	Mon Mon Mon Monsters	Director, writer, producer		
2020	A Choo 打噴嚏	Writer, producer		
2021	Till We Meet Again	Director		
2023	Miss Shampoo	Writer, director		

== Awards and nominations ==
Year	Award	Category	Nominated work	Result	Ref.
2011	48th Golden Horse Awards	Best New Director	You Are the Apple of My Eye	Nominated	
2011	48th Golden Horse Awards	Best Original Film Song	"Those Years" - You Are the Apple of My Eye	Nominated	
2012	31st Hong Kong Film Awards	Best Film from Mainland and Taiwan	You Are the Apple of My Eye	Won	
2012	12th Chinese Film Media Awards	Best New Director	You Are the Apple of My Eye	Won	
2017	21st Bucheon International Fantastic Film Festival	Audience Award	Mon Mon Mon Monsters	Won	
