= Three Tears in Borneo =

2024 Taiwanese war drama television series

- 聽海湧
- Genre: Drama; Suspense; Thriller
- Created by: Tsai Yu-fen
- Written by: Tsai Yu-fen
- Directed by: Sun Chieh-heng
- Starring: Han Wu; Huang Guan-Zhi; Edward Jhu; Lee Guo Chiang; Cindy Lien; Shih Ming-shuai; Andrew Chau Hou-On; Runa
- Country of origin: Taiwan
- Original languages: Japanese language, Taiwanese Hokkien, Iban language
- No. of seasons: 1
- No. of episodes: 5

Production
- Producers: Chia-Ju Lin, Tang Sheng-jung, Sun Chieh-heng
- Cinematography: Wang Chun-yu
- Editors: Kao Ming-sheng, Tu Su-ling
- Production companies: Unseen Film Studio, Sweet Tongue Production

Original release
- Network: Public Television Service
- Release: August 17 – August 31, 2024

Three Tears in Borneo (Chinese: 聽海湧) is a Taiwanese war drama series released in 2024, set in Borneo during World War II. Created by Tsai Yu-fen and directed by Sun Chieh-heng, the series stars Han Wu, Huang Guan-Zhi, Edward Jhu, Lee Guo Chiang, Cindy Lien, Shih Ming-shuai, Andrew Chau Hou-On and Runa. Comprising five episodes, the series premiered on Public Television Service on August 17, 2024, and began streaming on Line TV in October 2025. In Japan, the series became available on U-NEXT from 15 August 2026 under the Japanese title 《波の音色》. At the 60th Golden Bell Awards in 2025, the series won five awards, including Best Miniseries.

The series also attracted controversy over its depiction of historical events.

== Plot ==
Toward the end of the Pacific War, the Empire of Japan conscripted young men from its colony of Taiwan to serve as military auxiliaries, deploying them to Borneo to guard Allied prisoners of war captured by the Japanese military. After the war, Australian forces took control of the camps and discovered evidence of a massacre in the camp trenches, where the bodies of 42 individuals were found. The Taiwanese guards were subsequently accused of abusing and massacring prisoners and were brought to trial before the Australian Military Court.

== Actors ==
| Actor | Role | Description |
|---|---|---|
| Han Wu | Shinkai Zhiyuan | Taiwanese POW guard: the first defendant identified in the Trench Massacre Case |
| Huang Guan-Zhi | Shinkai Hui | Taiwanese POW Guard |
| Edward Jhu | Shinkai Mude | Taiwanese POW Guard |
| Shih Ming-shuai | Luo Chin-fu | A native of Fujian and Consul of the Republic of China to North Borneo, he became a prisoner of war during the conflict. |
| Cindy Lien | Ho Ching-Yi | The Consul's Wife |
| Lee Guo Chiang | Jun Hirota | Taiwanese POW Guard |
| Andrew Chau Hou-On | William Cole | Australian military prosecutor responsible for prosecuting the trench massacre case |
| Runa | Sakura / Asada Sakurako | A-Yuan's Japanese girlfriend |

== Production ==
Three Tears in Borneo was produced by Public Television Service and co-produced by the Kaohsiung City Government and San Yu Venture Capital. Principal photography began on 14 February 2023 and wrapped in mid-April 2023, with about 80% of scenes filmed in Kaohsiung. A prisoner-of-war camp set was built at the Nanxing Project Zone in Kaohsiung, with other scenes filmed in Taitung and Pingtung, and the crew also filmed on location in North Borneo, Malaysia. Before filming, the crew travelled to Borneo, Japan and the United Kingdom to research the history and collect material. The three lead actors trained in Japanese in Japan for three weeks before filming began. Huang Kuan-chih was hung upside down 20 times for one scene, filmed over three hours in the mountains of Taitung.

=== Historical basis ===
The series is based on the story of Ko Ching-Hsing, the chief guard at the Kuching prisoner-of-war camp, who was tried under his Japanese name Kawamura Teruhoshi and first sentenced to death, then retried to ten years after Sugita Tsuruo admitted ordering the killings. About 120,000 Taiwanese served as military auxiliaries, and 200,000 Taiwanese were conscripted in total; there were 104 prisoner-of-war camps holding 350,000 Allied prisoners, of whom 27% died. The real consul, Zhuo Huanlai, was executed on 6 July 1945, while his wife Chao Shih-Ping survived and lived to 96. In the drama, the fates are reversed: the consul lives to the trial, and A-Yuan is executed, the opposite of Ko, who lived. Screenwriter Tsai Yu-fen said the protagonist's ending is the opposite of Ko Ching-Hsing's own fate: "the sentence was not changed, still death... no good deed goes unpunished."

== Episodes ==
The five episodes aired on Saturdays at 9 pm on PTS, two per week. Episodes 1 and 2 aired on 17 August 2024, episodes 3 and 4 on 24 August, and episode 5 on 31 August. The first two episodes are titled "Black Kite" (黒鸥) and "Red Sun" (赤陽). Episode 3 is titled "Strong Wind" (強風). Episode 4 is titled "Pygmy Elephant" (侏儒象). Episode 5 is titled "Sea Waves" (海湧).

== Reception ==
The first two episodes were watched by 403,900 viewers in Taiwan. Viewers from seven countries watched the premiere, and the series ranked first among dramas on PTS+ and Hami Video on its first day. The first two episodes premiered at the 26th Taipei Film Festival in July 2024 and received positive reviews there. The National Museum of Taiwan History held an exhibition about the series and the Taiwanese prisoner-of-war guards, "Three Tears in Borneo and Its Era", from 10 September 2024 to 8 June 2025.

=== Controversy ===
Following its broadcast, the series faced criticism for allegedly distorting historical facts and disparaging the real-life figures upon whom its characters were based. In response, PTS held a discussion forum, during which director Sun Chieh-heng stated that while the series was inspired by historical events, all the characters are fictional.

== Awards and nominations ==
At the 60th Golden Bell Awards in 2025, Three Tears in Borneo received 14 nominations and won five awards, including Best Miniseries.

| Year | Ceremony | Award | Nominee | Result |
| 2025 | 60th Golden Bell Awards | Best Miniseries | Three Tears in Borneo | Won |
| 2025 | 60th Golden Bell Awards | Best Director for a Miniseries or TV Movie | Sun Chieh-heng | Won |
| 2025 | 60th Golden Bell Awards | Best Screenplay for a Miniseries or TV Movie | Tsai Yu-fen | Won |
| 2025 | 60th Golden Bell Awards | Best Leading Actor in a Miniseries or TV Movie | Han Wu | Nominated |
| 2025 | 60th Golden Bell Awards | Best Leading Actor in a Miniseries or TV Movie | Huang Kuan-chih | Nominated |
| 2025 | 60th Golden Bell Awards | Best Supporting Actor in a Miniseries or TV Movie | Edward Jhu | Won |
| 2025 | 60th Golden Bell Awards | Best Supporting Actor in a Miniseries or TV Movie | Andrew Chau Hou-On | Nominated |
| 2025 | 60th Golden Bell Awards | Best Cinematography for a Drama Series | Wang Chun-yu | Nominated |
| 2025 | 60th Golden Bell Awards | Best Editing for a Drama Series | Kao Ming-sheng, Tu Su-ling | Won |
| 2025 | 60th Golden Bell Awards | Best Lighting for a Drama Series | Yang Ching-han | Nominated |
| 2025 | 60th Golden Bell Awards | Best Art Design for a Drama Series | Liao Hui-li, Li Wei | Nominated |
| 2025 | 60th Golden Bell Awards | Best Visual Effects for a Drama Series | Liu Wei-yi, Lin Han-ping | Nominated |
| 2025 | 60th Golden Bell Awards | Best Sound Design for a Drama Series | Chang Che-hung | Nominated |
| 2025 | 60th Golden Bell Awards | Best Original Score for a Drama Series | Thomas Foguenne | Nominated |
