= Lao Tang Lake Art Village =

Tourist attraction in Tainan, Taiwan

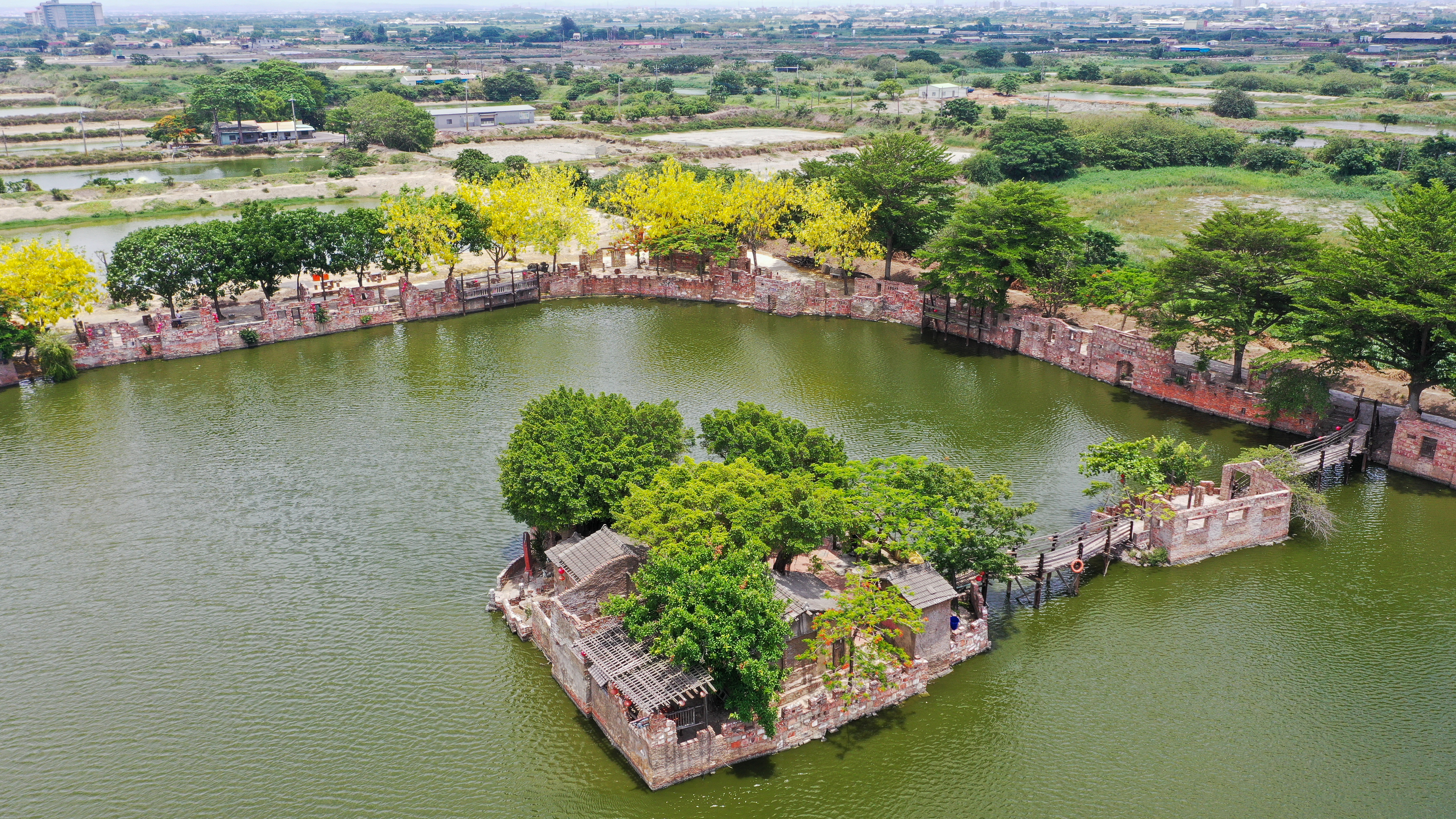

General information
- Type: Cultural park / Ancient-style art village
- Location: No. 49-26, Meifeng, Fenghe Village, Syuejia District, Tainan City 726, Taiwan, Syuejia District
- Coordinates: 23°22′N 120°20′E
- Owner: Kuang Yi

Website
- http://www.88bon.com/

Lao Tang Lake Art Village is a tourist attraction in Tainan. Located in Fenghe Village on the eastern outskirts of Syuejia District, it is a Minnan-style cultural park situated along Provincial Highway 171.

Originally, Lao Tang Lake Art Village was an abandoned fish pond rather than a historical site. It was created by the artist Kuang Yi (formerly known as Kuang Jin-Fu), a native of Zuoying, Kaohsiung. Over more than 30 years, he collected and acquired materials from more than 140 dismantled buildings—dating back 100 to 300 years—from places such as Lukang in Changhua, Yuejin in Yanshui, and Anping in Tainan. Through the reuse of these aged architectural elements, he transformed the site into a desolate, ancient-style town, which he named “Lao Tang Lake Art Village.”

Another account suggests that the site was originally an abandoned duck-farming area.

== Filming location ==
- Moneyboys
- A Traditional Story of Taiwan
- Haru
