= Another Woman =

Another Woman may refer to:

- Another Woman (1988 film)
- Another Woman (2015 film)
- "Another Woman (Too Many People)", a song by Samantha Fox from the album Just One Night (Samantha Fox album)
