= Murphy's Law of Love =

- Promo poster
- Also known as: Perhaps, This is Called Love
- 莫非，这就是爱情
- Genre: Romance, Comedy
- Created by: Sanlih E-Television
- Written by: Wang Ruo-ting 王若婷 (Ep. 1-13); Chen Jie-ying 陳潔瑩 (Ep. 8-19); Fang Yi-de 方懿德 (Ep. 1); Wu Xiang-ying 吳香穎 (Ep. 1); Chen Xin-ying 陳妡盈 (Ep. 1-5); Zhu Ying 諸英 (Ep. 2-14); Lan Meng-he 藍夢荷 (Ep. 2-6); Chen Pei-wen 陳佩妏 (Ep. 2-13); Luo Qian-ni 羅茜妮 (Ep. 7-13); Zhang Ya-jun 張雅郡 (Ep. 15-19)
- Directed by: Ye Tian-lun 葉天倫 (Ep. 1); Li Qing-rong 李青蓉 (Ep. 1-4); Hao Xin-xiang 郝心翔 (Ep. 5-19)
- Starring: Danson Tang 唐禹哲; Ivelyn Lee 李佳穎; Jolin Chien 簡宏霖; Jenna Wang 王思平
- Opening theme: Fly With Me by Landy Wen 溫嵐
- Ending theme: Want To Say 想說 by GJ 蔣卓嘉
- Country of origin: Republic of China (Taiwan)
- Original language: Mandarin
- No. of seasons: 1
- No. of episodes: 19

Production
- Producer: An Jing-hong 安景鴻
- Production location: Taiwan
- Camera setup: Multi camera
- Running time: 90 minutes
- Production companies: Sanlih E-Television 三立電視; TM Brothers Media Co. Ltd 天億兄弟影音傳媒股份有限公司

Original release
- Network: SETTV
- Release: 20 March – 24 July 2015

Related
- Aim High 22K夢想高飛; Love Cuisine 料理高校生

Murphy's Law of Love (Chinese: 莫非，這就是愛情; pinyin: mò fēi zhè jìu shì aì qǐng) is a 2015 Taiwanese romantic comedy television series produced by Sanlih E-Television. Starring Danson Tang, Ivelyn Lee, Jolin Chien and Jenna Wang as the main cast. The Chinese title literally translates to "Perhaps, This is Called Love". Filming began on February 24, 2015, the drama will be filmed as it airs. First original broadcast begins March 20, 2015 on SETTV channel airing on Fridays from 10:00-11:30 pm.

== Synopsis ==
Murphy's Law means anything that can go wrong will go wrong.
Guan Xiao-tong (Ivelyn Lee) has been cursed with Murphy's Law all her life. Every time her attainable desires are within reach, they somehow escape her grasp at the last moment. After her boyfriend dumps her and breaks her heart, Xiao-tong decides to use her psychiatry expertise to help others with love at an online matchmaking service. Soon a divorce firm opens across the street from her office, threatening the matchmaking service. The divorce firm's owner, Ji Jia-wei (Danson Tang), thinks Xiao-tong's theory and love advice is idiotic while she thinks he is a cold hearted person who doesn't believe in love and only started his business so others can be like him. But since Xiao-tong is cursed with Murphy's Law, Jia-wei whom she has no interest in, starts falling for her when she unknowingly starts to melt his ice-cold heart.

== Plot summary ==
Guan Xiao-tong has been dealing with Murphy's Law from the moment she was conceived. Just as she was starting to imagine a future with her boyfriend he dumps her, telling her he is set to marry someone he doesn't love but is wealthy. That same night, at the same place, Ji Jia-wei gets rejected when he proposes marriage to his celebrity girlfriend He Zhi-yu, who cares more about her career than him. Heartbroken, Jia-wei gives the engagement ring to a drunk Xiao-tong. A year later Xiao-tong and Jia-wei meet again in the most unpleasant circumstances and become instant enemies when his umbrella accidentally splashes puddle water on her. She becomes annoyed with his unapologetic behavior while he thinks she should have been more observant of her surroundings. Their hatred for each other grows when they discover that they're in the opposite business of love. She's a Love Doctor that helps people find love at a matchmaking service while he's the boss and owner of a divorce firm that helps couples walk away from their broken marriages amicably.

When one of Jia-wei's employees and friends signs him up as a member of the matchmaking service as a joke, he becomes the most popular bachelor. Soon Xiao-tong is pressured by her boss and has to pretend to be friendly to Jia-wei in order to get him to accept an invitation to her company's matchmaking party so he can meet all the female members of the matchmaking service that are interested in him. During Xiao-tong's persuasion for Jia-wei to accept her company's invitation, he slowly develops feelings for her that at first he is uncertain of since he thought he couldn't stand her. However, every time restaurateur Xiang Zi-yan who possess all the qualities of Xiao-tong's ideal guy, is in her presence he becomes jealous and mad that she isn't paying attention to him. When his secretary, who is a follower of Xiao-tong's love advice blog, tells him to think about his feelings clearly he is unable to deny his feelings for Xiao-tong.

After her company's matchmaking party ends, Xiao-tong thinks she no longer has to deal with Jia-wei anymore, but with his growing feelings for her he proposes to her boss that the divorce firm and the matchmaking service team up and work together to help his divorced clients find love again, in order for him to continue associating with Xiao-tong without anyone finding out his true feelings for her. Jia-wei's entire staff notices him acting weird while the entire staff at the matchmaking service thinks the divorce firm has ulterior motives to steal their business setup.

Just when Xiao-tong is starting to get to know Zi-yan at a personal level, Jia-wei makes his presences known by showing her his caring side. Soon she finds out Jia-wei actually has a warm side and starts to have growing feelings for him. With her continued friendship with Zi-yan, Jia-wei sees a love rival in him and actively starts his pursuit for Xiao-tong by grandly professing his love for her. He soon wins her heart and the two begin officially dating to Zi-yan's disappointment who can only step aside and contain his feelings for Xiao-tong.

Xiao-tong's Murphy's Law curse once again catches up with her. Just when she and Jia-wei began their relationship as a couple and all seemed happy and perfect, his ex-girlfriend Zhi-yu, whom he previously could not get over returns to Taiwan and expects to reconcile with him. Jia-wei, still holding a grudge against Zhi-yu, brushes her off. Zhi-yu is undeterred by his rejections and continues her path to win his love back despite him bluntly telling her he has moved on and is in a happy relationship with Xiao-tong.

== Cast ==
=== Main cast ===
- Danson Tang 唐禹哲 as Ji Jia-wei 紀家尉 - Male age 30

With his good looks and wealthy background he is a good catch for many single ladies, but after being rejected by his ex-girlfriend He Zhi-yu when he proposes marriage, heartbroken he chooses to remain single and is afraid to love again. He opens "Renew Agent of Divorce", a firm that helps couples move past their broken relationships and end their relationship on friendly terms, right across the street from "I MEET YOU" which the dating service sees as a threat to their business. In order to ward off anyone that might be interested in him he wears a fake wedding band to lie about his marital status. His only companion is his pet dog Polo that he has conversations with. One year after originally encountering Xiao-tong he meets her again but doesn't realize he had met her before. The two start off on the wrong foot due to an unpleasant encounter which later leads to many misunderstandings and bickering. They become enemies due to their rivaled businesses and he nicknames her "Dr. Loser" because she is a love guru with the title "Dr. Love". Thinking her theories and advice about love is idiotic he uses the alias "Wayne" to post the question of why he is unable to love another on her blog. When she gets every answer correct about what he is mentally thinking of, he starts to believe that she is indeed the real deal. After an accidental kiss and seeing how caring she is towards one of his distraught clients he develops feelings for her but isn't sure how he feels since he couldn't stand her, however with the arrival of restaurateur Xiang Zi-yan in her life he shows his anger and jealousy for Xiao-tong's attention whenever Zi-yan is presence or name is mentioned. Feeling able to love again and seeing a heated rival in Zi-yan, he starts to actively pursuing Xiao-tong and continues to communicate with her as "Wayne" for love advice during his pursuit for her.

- Ivelyn Lee 李佳穎 as Guan Xiao-tong 關曉彤 - Female age 30

She has fought with Murphy's Law all her life, knowing she is jinxed she is always prepared. After her boyfriend breaks up with her to marry someone he doesn't love but is wealthy, she has had a bias against rich people because she thinks they can use money to buy whatever they want. Wanting to help others who have been heartbroken like her she quits her job as a hospital psychiatrist and uses her expertise to give advice about love at the "I MEET YOU Online Dating Agency". She becomes a popular "Love Doctor" giving advice and lectures on her blog and monthly seminars. She also coins the phrase "4G Man" as the perfect man which stands for guts, giver, gentle and guarantee. Not knowing she had encountered Ji Jia-wei on her night of heartbreak she meets him again one year later in unpleasant circumstances. Due to their rivaled businesses and her misunderstandings of him she becomes enemies with him and gives him the nicknames "NG Man" and "Frozen Pork Chop" because he has none of the qualities of her "4G Man" and his cold exterior. When someone jokingly signs up Jia-wei as a member of "I MEET YOU", he becomes the most popular bachelor. Her boss pressures her to convince Jia-wei to accept the invitation to their single ladies party, in order to do so she stalks and pretends to be friendly to him. After Jia-wei attends the singles party and working closely together on their companies collaboration she starts realizing that he may appear cold on the outside but is actually soft and warm inside, eventually her opinion of him being an "NG Man" and "Frozen Pork Chop" diminishes and now sees him as a "Durian", spiky and hard outside but soft and sweet inside. She meets Xiang Zi-yan while dining at his restaurant. He soon becomes her knight in shining armor as he seems to avert her Murphy's Law. Just when she was getting to know Zi-yan, Jia-wei actively pursues her, which gets her heart beating and thinking about him. But her Murphy's Law catches up to her as it seems every direction is pointing her towards Zi-yan since he is her boss's son, her mother's cooking instructor and her best friend Xin-xin is pushing for them to be together, but her feelings for him is as a friend only.

- Jolin Chien 簡宏霖 as Xiang Zi-yan 向子諺 - Male age 28

A restaurateur and cooking instructor who also hobbies in amateur photography. He meets Guan Xiao-tong when she dines at his restaurant. He becomes instantly interested in her because she resembles a picture displayed in his restaurant. Upon conversing with her he does not tell her his true status and only lets her think of him as a waiter that works at the restaurant. He also happens to be Xiao-tong's boss Wu Mei-zhen, son and her mother Liu Xiu-mei's cooking instructor. Though he seems to possess all of Xiao-tong's "4G Man" quality, being her boss's son and her mother and friend liking him he is shoo–in to become her new boyfriend, but with Jia-wei actively pursuing her, her feelings for Zi-yan seems to be only as a friend. During Xiao-tong and Jia-wei's break up he finally confesses his feelings for her only for her to reject him but the two stay on as friends. It is hinted at the end that he and Hu An-ting might become a couple.

- Jenna Wang 王思平 as He Zhi-yu 何芝羽 - Female age 30

Ji Jia-wei ex-girlfriend. A print model who is also a budding actress. She puts her career before her love life. When she rejects Jia-wei's marriage proposal he breaks up with her. Wanting to patch up with Jia-wei she rushes to him but gets involve in a car accident and disappears from Jia-wei's life to receive medical treatment for her disfigured face abroad. After recovering and returning to Taiwan she expects to reconcile with Jia-wei, but due to Jia-wei's new found love with Xiao-tong and still holding a grudge against her for walking out on him a year ago without a word he brushes her off. Undeterred by Jia-wei's rejections, she continues on her path to regain his love by constantly reminding him of their past memories together and showing him that her career is no longer the most important thing in her life.

=== Supporting cast ===
==== Renew Agent of Divorce staff ====
- JR 紀言愷 as Lín Shao-qiang 林少強 - Male age 32

Ji Jia-wei's best friend and co-worker. He is the dependable friend that Jia-wei relies on in work and personally. After the "I MEET YOU" and "Renew" joint social gather he develops a crush on Xia Xin-xin and starts to pursue her.

- Enson Zhang 張雁名 as Simon Wang Xi-men 王西門 - Male age 32

Ji Jia-wei's immature friend and co-worker. Even though he is married he likes to use Jia-wei's identity to meet females online. When his online chat friend Xia Xin-xin who works at "I MEET YOU" asks him to help her sign up new members at her dating service he uses Jia-wei's identity to sign up.

- Mandy Tao 陶嫚曼 as Hu An-ting 胡安婷 - Female age 23

The newly hired receptionist and secretary at "Renew". She is a fan of Guan Xiao-tong that follows her advice blog religiously and attends all her seminars. It is hinted at the end that she and Xiang Zi-yan might become a couple.

==== I MEET YOU dating service staff ====
- Phoebe Huang 黃嘉千 as Wu Mei-zhen 鄔美貞 - Female

Owner and boss of "I MEET YOU Online Dating Agency". A demanding boss that won't accept any excuses. After finding out that her dating services most popular bachelor is Ji Jia-wei and that he is also the owner of "Renew" she still insist Xiao-tong to have Jia-wei accept the "Popular King" title and attend their singles meet party. She is also Xiang Zi-yan's single mother who is searching for love herself.

- Verna Lin 林欣蓓 as Xia Xin-xin 夏欣欣 = Female age 28

Guan Xiao-tong's best friend and co-worker. She is also online chat friends with Simon who works at "Renew". She tries to hook up Xiao-tong with Xiang Zi-yan after noticing that he averts her Murphy's Law jinx.

- Steven Sun 孫其君 as Ai Lun 艾倫 - Male age 30

The webmaster at "I MEET YOU" who is in charge of maintaining and managing the companies website and all the members information.

- Johnny Yang 楊銘威 as Ke Rui 柯瑞 - Male

The new webmaster at "I MEET YOU" who replaces Alan. He has an unrequited for Hu An-ting.

==== Ji family ====
- Lin Wei 林煒 as Jì Shou-zheng 紀守正 - Male age 48

Ji Jia-wei's single father. He pushes his son to either take over his business so he could retire and travel the world or start dating again.

==== Guan family ====
- Shen Meng-sheng 沈孟生 as Guan Bo-wei 關伯威 - Male age 60

Guan Xiao-tong and Guan Xiao-qing's father. Liu Xiu-mei's husband.

- Fang Wen-lin as Liu Xiu-mei 劉秀梅 - Female age 58

Guan Xiao-tong and Guan Xiao-qing's mother. Guan Bo-wei's wife. She is also a cooking student of Xiang Zi-yan. She sees Zi-yan as a potential son-in-law and wants to set Xiao-tong on a blind date with him.

- Chiago Liu 劉容嘉 as Guan Xiao-qing 關曉清 - Female age 33

Guan Xiao-tong's older sister. Married for less than a year, she catches her cheating husband with his mistress when she comes home earlier than expected. She and her ex-husband becomes "Renew's" first clients.

=== Extended cast ===
- Vince Kao 高英軒 as Du Kai-wen 杜凱文 - Male age 34

Guan Xiao-tong's ex-boyfriend. He is the heir to a beauty treatment spa. Even though he loved Xiao-tong he still broke up with her to marry someone he didn't love because that other person was wealthy.

- Liang Che 亮哲 as young Guan Bo-wei 年輕關伯威 - Male

Guan Xiao-tong's father during his youth. He had hoped Xiao-tong to be a son during his wife's pregnancy.

- Pan Wen-jing 潘文菁 as young Liu Xiu-mei 年輕劉秀梅 - Female

Guan Xiao-tong's mother during her youth. She had no plans for a second child but got pregnant with Xiao-tong.

- Angel He 何潔柔 as childhood Guan Xiao-tong 幼年關曉彤 - Female

Young Xiao-tong who notices nothing ever going right for her.

- Chen Shih-Yin 陳詩穎 as teenage Guan Xiao-tong 青年關曉彤 - Female

Teenage Xiao-tong who discovers that she is jinxed with Murphy's Law after rushing home to watch Fated to Love You only to have the power go out.

- Yumi Zhao 趙又潔 as childhood He Zhi-yu 幼年何芝羽
- Zhu Yu-hong 朱育宏 as Doctor 醫生 - Male

The doctor who delivered Guan Xiao-tong.

- Yang Ya-lin 楊雅琳 as Nurse 護士 - Female

The nurse who helped deliver Guan Xiao-tong.

- Patrick Li 李沛旭 as Mr. Fu 傅先生 - Male

One of Ji Jia-wei's clients who reconcile with his ex-wife Ms. He after remaining on friendly terms with her after their divorce.

- Cherry Hsia 夏如芝 as Ms. He 何小姐 - Female

One of Ji Jia-wei's clients who reconcile with her ex-husband Mr. Fu after remaining on friendly terms with him after their divorce.

- Danny Liang 梁正群 as Guo Jia-cheng 郭嘉誠 - Male

Guan Xiao-qing's cheating ex-husband. Insisting on having a divorce party held by "Renew". At the party he says he did no wrong during their marriage in front of their friends.

- Zhang Jia-hui 張家慧 as Linda - Female

A client of "Renew" who is interested in Ji Jia-wei and planned on starting a relationship with him after her divorce. When Jia-wei rejects her advances she becomes suicidal.

- Chris Lung 隆宸翰 as Chen You Wei 陳有為 - Male

A divorced participant of Renew and I Meet You's joint social camping trip to help people find love. He blames Xiao-tong when his matched mate swindles him.

- Ruyun He 何如芸 as mother Ji 紀母 - Female

Ji Jia-wei's mother. She walked out on her husband and son when he was a child.

- Jiajia Kuo 郭秩嘉 as young Ji Jia-wei 幼年紀家尉 - Female

The sight of his mother walking out on him scares him for life.

- Yan Yi-píng 顏怡平 as Amy - Female

He Zhi-yu's personal assistant.

- Yorke Sun 孫沁岳 as Ah Da 阿達 - Male

Jia-wei's newly wed college friend. Jia-wei brings Xiao-tong to his wedding as their first official date. His newly wed wife has an illness.

- Coara Huang 黃安若 as Linda - Female

Ah Da's newly wed wife. She has an illness.

- Ashi Lin 林育品 as Xiao Wei 小薇 - Female

Simon Wang's wife.

== Murphy's Law ==
A list of Murphy's Law mentioned in each episode.

Episode	Law #	Murphy's Law
1	1	If there is a possibility of things going wrong the one that will hurt the most will mostly happen. 如果事情有兩種可能，你不想要的越會發生。
1	2	It never rains when you have an umbrella, but pours when you don't have one. 帶傘的時候不下雨，沒帶傘的時候下大雨。
2	3	If there is a correct solution, then it will bring new problems. 有效的解決方案，都會帶來新的問題。
2	4	There is never enough time to do it right the first time, but always enough time to redo it again. 事情永遠做不完，但總有多的時間重做。
3	5	The more you don't want to meet someone, the easier you'll meet. 越不想遇到的人，越容易遇到。
3	6	If all seems well, you have obviously overlooked something. 要是一切看來順利，一定有哪裡出錯了。
5	7	The thing you need at the most critical moment, is not in your hand. 關鍵時候最需要的東西，偏偏不在手上。
7	8	The day you wear high heels, the ground has potholes. 穿高跟鞋那天，地上一定坑坑洞洞。
12	9	When trying to find a person, you search the world but still can't find them. 想找到一個人時，翻遍全世界都找不到他。
15	10	Every thing is not as good as it looks. 事情往往都沒有表面上看起來那麼簡單。
16	11	Even though we love each other so much, there is still a good reason to separate. 即使相愛，總有一個不能在一起的完美理由。

== Soundtrack ==
Murphy's Law of Love Original TV Soundtrack (OST)

Soundtrack album by Various artists
- Released: 9 May 2015
- Genre: Mandopop
- Language: Mandarin
- Label: HOVE (Ho Vision Entertainment Co., Ltd)

Murphy's Law of Love Original TV Soundtrack (OST) (莫非，这就是爱情 電視原聲帶) was released on May 8, 2015, by various artists under HOVE, Ltd. It contains 13 tracks total, in which 6 songs are various instrumental versions of the songs. The opening theme is track 1 "Fly With Me" by Landy Wen 溫嵐, while the closing theme is track 2 "Want To Say 想說" by GJ 蔣卓嘉.

=== Track listing ===
No.	Title	Singer(s)	Length
1.	"Fly With Me"	Landy Wen 溫嵐	3:16
2.	"Want To Say" (想說)	GJ 蔣卓嘉	3:45
3.	"What Is The Shape Of Your Love" (你的愛是什麼形狀)	J.Arie (Rachel Lui) 雷琛瑜	3:45
4.	"Can't Be Friends" (不能做朋友)	Jack Kim 金韓一	4:00
5.	"Heart Magic" (心魔)	J.Arie (Rachel Lui) 雷琛瑜	3:46
6.	"Runaway"	Jack Kim 金韓一	4:42
7.	"On The Road" (在路上)	Nori 鐘純妍	4:07
8.	"Fly With Me (Sweetheart ver.)"	Instrumental	3:16
9.	"Want To Say (Lonely ver.)" (想說 (孤單落寞版 ))	Instrumental	3:45
10.	"What Is The Shape Of Your Love (Romantic Memories ver.)" (你的愛是什麼形狀 (浪漫回憶版))	Instrumental	3:45
11.	"Can't Be Friends (Struggling ver.)" (幸福滿滿 (掙扎思念版))	Instrumental	4:00
12.	"Heart Magic (Happy House ver.)" (心魔 (歡樂滿屋版))	Instrumental	3:46
13.	"On The Road" (在路上 (淡淡憂傷版))	Instrumental	4:07

== Publications ==
* 4 June 2015 : S-Pop Vol. 28 July 2014 (華流 6月號/2015第28期 ) - Barcode 471709558780906 - Author: Sanlih E-Television 三立電視監製

For the June 2015 issue of S-Pop magazine, the lead actors of Murphy's Law of Love are featured on one out of three covers published. The Murphy's Law of Love cover is a special edition with a mouse pad featuring the promo image on it, included.

== Filming locations ==
The opening sequence of the drama was filmed on a studio built set at Sanlih's headquarters in the Neihu District of Taipei. The closing sequence and end credits were filmed entirely in Chiayi, Taiwan. Places included Zhuqi Station, Jhuci Waterfront Park and National Chung Cheng University. The offices of where the main characters work at are located on the ground floor of No. 14 and 17 Lane 177, Guangfu N Rd in the Songshan District of Taipei, Taiwan. Both are vacant storefronts that was remodel by the production team. The home of the Guan family are two separate home-stays located in Yilan County, Taiwan. The Guan family living area and building exterior is the "Nature Country Homestay - BnB", while Guan Xiao-tong's bedroom is the "Fish Homestay". The exterior of Ji Jia-wei's residence is an interior design firm named "ART Interior Design 亞圖設計", located at Alley 2, Lane 69, Section 5, Minsheng E Rd in the Songshan District of Taipei Taiwan.

=== Taipei, Taiwan ===
- Daan District
  - TJ Dog
  - Yunzhinan Japanese Restaurant 雲之南麗江斑魚火鍋
- Datong District
  - Chelsea Gallery 雀兒喜畫廊
- Neihu District
  - 7-Eleven (No. 30 Xingzhong Road)
  - Sanlih Headquarters
  - Subaru (Xinhu 3rd rd)
- Songshan District
  - 14 Lane 177, Guangfu N Rd
  - 17 Lane 177, Guangfu N Rd
  - ART Interior Design 亞圖設計
- Xinyi District
  - FooShion SKY Festival 食尚攝影棚
- Wanhua District
  - Huazhong Riverside Park 華中河濱公園
- Zhongshan District
  - Maji Maji Square 集食行樂
- Zhongzheng District
  - Wunan Books

=== Changhua County, Taiwan ===
- Lukang District
  - Chang Bing Show Chwan Health Park
  - Lukang Christian Hospital 彰基鹿基分院

=== Chiayi, Taiwan ===
- Chiayi County
  - Jhuci Waterfront Park
  - National Chung Cheng University
  - Zhuqi Station

=== Hualien County, Taiwan ===
- Shoufeng Township
  - Hualien Hai Wan 32 花蓮海灣32行館
- Xincheng Township
  - Qixingtan Beach

=== Kaohsiung City, Taiwan ===
- Gushan District
  - URBAN Kitchen 爾本廚房

=== Miaoli County, Taiwan ===
- Touwu Township
  - Young Lake Resort 明湖水漾會館

=== New Taipei City, Taiwan ===
- Sanchong District
  - Xianse Temple 三重先嗇宮
  - Xingfushuiyang Park 幸福水漾公園
- Sanxia District
  - 7-Eleven (Daxue Rd & Xueqin Rd)
- Sanzhi District
  - Datun Natural Park
  - Yangmingshan National Park
- Tamsui District
  - Tamsui Fisherman's Wharf
- Xinzhuang District
  - Drift Caffe 沒有方向

=== Taichung ===
- West District
  - hecho brunch & bistro 做咖啡2
  - hecho cafe & restaurant 做咖啡
  - Park Lane by CMP 勤美誠品綠園道

=== Tainan City, Taiwan ===
- Liuying District
  - Nan Yuan Garden Resort Farm 南元花園休閒農場

=== Yilan County, Taiwan ===
- Yilan City
  - Fish Homestay 宜蘭魚悅
- Zhuangwei Township
  - Nature Country Homestay - BnB 宜然風鄉村民宿

== Development and casting ==
- The opening sequence was filmed on February 6, 2014, at SETTV studios.
- The closing sequence was filmed March 3, 2015 on location at Chiayi County, Taiwan.
- A press conference was held on March 5, 2015, at SETTV headquarters lobby in Neihu District, Taipei, introducing the main leads, Danson Tang and Ivelyn Lee, along with second male lead Jolin Chien of the drama.
- The premier press conference with introduction of the entire cast was held on March 19, 2015, at SETTV headquarters auditorium in Neihu District, Taipei. Fans where invited with limited seating on a first-come, first-served basis.
- The entire main cast appeared on a live episode of New Show Biz located at SETTV headquarters on March 19, 2015, to promote the drama.
- The four main cast members appeared at a press conference on March 23, 2015, at SETTV headquarters rooftop garden to further promote the drama and celebrate a solid premiere episode rating.
- Steven Sun's character Ai Lun 艾倫 was written out when he had to leave the drama mid-way since he had been cast in Sanlih's weekday sitcom Bitter Sweet 軍官·情人.

== Broadcast ==
Network	Country	Airing Date	Timeslot
SETTV	Taiwan	March 18, 2015	Friday 10:00-11:30 pm
ETTV	Taiwan	March 21, 2015	Saturday 8:00-9:30 pm
Astro Shuang Xing	Malaysia	March 20, 2015	Friday 10:00 pm–11:30 pm
Astro AEC	Malaysia	December 14, 2015	Monday to Friday 4:00-5:00 pm
StarHub TV	Singapore	March 29, 2015	Sunday 10:00 pm–11:30 pm
True Asian Series	Thailand	April 17, 2016	Saturday & Sunday 7:00 pm

== Episode ratings ==
Competing dramas on rival channels airing at the same time slot were:
- TTV - The New World, Youth Power
- SET - Life Of Pearl, An Adopted Daughter
- FTV - Justice Heroes
- CTV - Boysitter, i Hero, Doctor Stranger

Air Date	Episode	Average Ratings	Rank
March 20, 2015	1	1.13	3
March 27, 2015	2	0.98	3
April 3, 2015	3	0.81	3
April 10, 2015	4	1.11	3
April 17, 2015	5	1.08	3
April 24, 2015	6	1.24	3
May 1, 2015	7	1.08	3
May 8, 2015	8	1.15	2
May 15, 2015	9	1.29	2
May 22, 2015	10	1.37	2
May 29, 2015	11	1.35	2
June 5, 2015	12	1.03	3
June 12, 2015	13	1.17	3
June 19, 2015	14	1.28	2
June 26, 2015	15	1.27	2
July 3, 2015	16	1.17	3
July 10, 2015	17	1.36	2
July 17, 2015	18	1.27	2
July 24, 2015	19	1.61	2
Average ratings		1.20	

== Awards and nominations ==
Ceremony	Category	Nominee	Result
2015 Sanlih Drama Awards	Best Actor Award	Danson Tang	Nominated
2015 Sanlih Drama Awards	Best Actress Award	Ivelyn Lee	Nominated
2015 Sanlih Drama Awards	Best Screen Couple Award	Danson Tang & Ivelyn Lee	Nominated
2015 Sanlih Drama Awards	Best Kiss Award	Danson Tang & Ivelyn Lee	Won
2015 Sanlih Drama Awards	Best Green Leaf Award	Phoebe Huang	Nominated
2015 Sanlih Drama Awards	Best Selling S-Pop Magazine Award	Danson Tang	Nominated
2015 Sanlih Drama Awards	Best Selling S-Pop Magazine Award	Ivelyn Lee	Nominated
2015 Sanlih Drama Awards	Viewers Choice Drama Award	Murphy's Law of Love	Won
