= Janel Tsai =

Taiwanese actress and fashion model

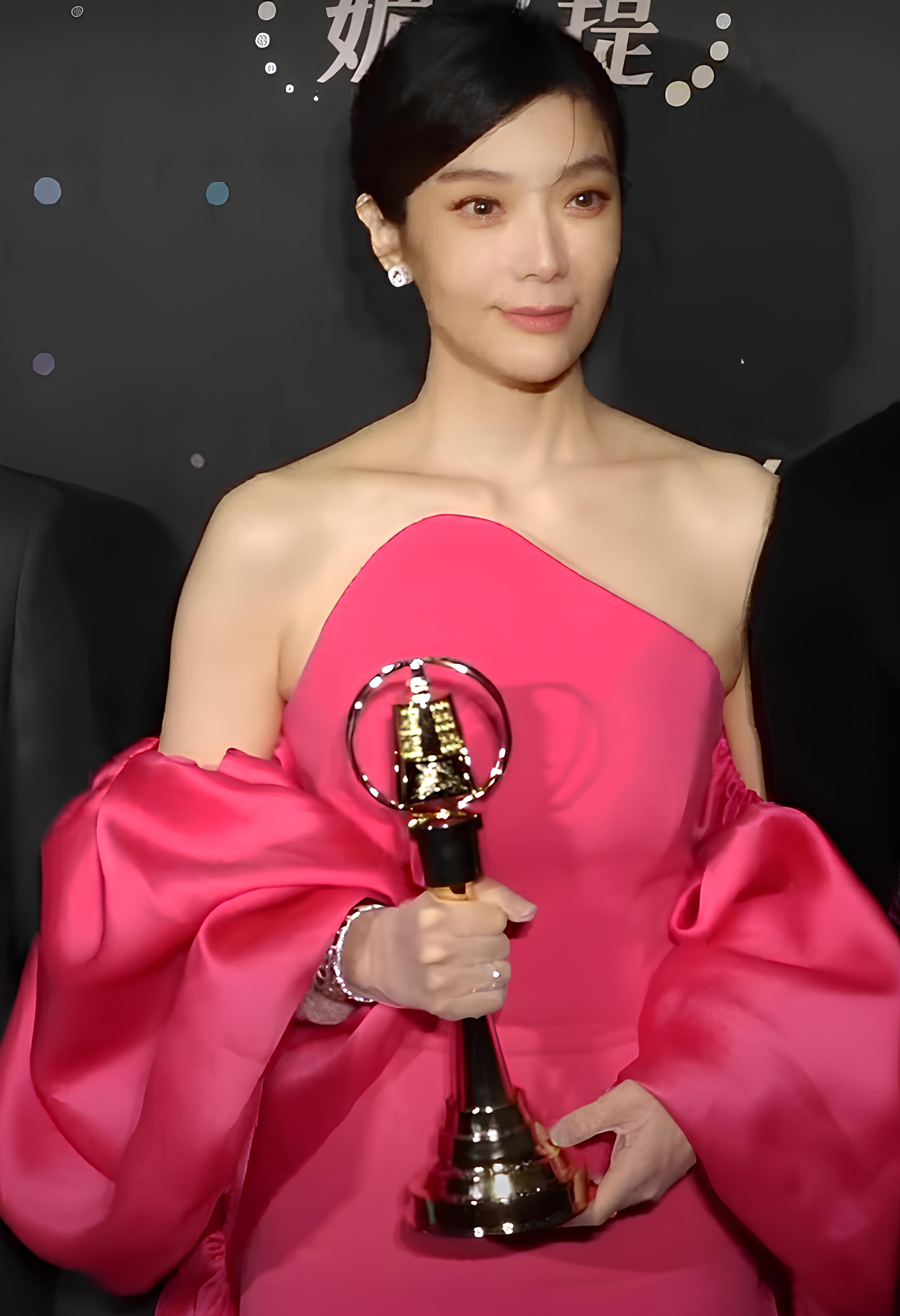
- Tsai at the 58th Golden Bell Awards on October 21, 2023
- Born: March 14, 1975 (age 51); Taichung, Taiwan
- Occupations: Actor; model; screenwriter
- Years active: 1994–present

Chinese name
- Traditional Chinese: 蔡淑臻
- Simplified Chinese: 蔡淑臻
- Hanyu Pinyin: Cài Shūzhēn
- Jyutping: Coi3 Suk6zeon1

Janel Tsai (born 14 March 1975) is a Taiwanese actress and model. She is known for portraying He Ailin in The Fierce Wife (2011) and Yang Chien in CSIC: I Hero (2015). In 2020, she won Best Supporting Actress in a Television Series at the 55th Golden Bell Awards for her portrayal of Tang Juan in Hate the Sin, Love the Sinner. In 2023, she won Best Leading Actress in a Television Series at the 58th Golden Bell Awards for her portrayal of Liu Zi-xu in Mad Doctor.

== Early life ==
Tsai was born on 14 March 1975 in Taichung, Taiwan. Her mother is from Wuqi, Taichung. Growing up, she spoke Taiwanese with her mother. She attended Yudah High School of Commerce in Taipei with a focus in Japanese.

== Career ==
Tsai began her modeling career after a friend invited her to a photo shoot. Initially, she planned to retire at 28, but the growing popularity of model/actress Lin Chi-ling gave her the opportunity to try acting. She has since acted in a variety of television shows, films, miniseries, and music videos.

== Personal life ==
In 2017, Tsai was diagnosed with myofascial pain syndrome and paused acting for a year.

She dated actor Patrick Lee from 2012 to 2020.

== Filmography ==
=== Television ===
Year	English title	Mandarin title	Role
2003	Friends	名揚四海	Angie
2003	My Secret Garden	我的秘密花園	Ting Ai-Yun
2003	Spicy School – Clever Teacher	麻辣學園妙鮮師	Fang Kei-Jen
2003	Fen hong nü lang	澀女郎	Man Tzu
2003	I'm the Man	我是男子漢	Alice
2005	Male Nurse Nightingale	男丁格爾	Jian Zhong's sister
2005	Ping-{}-Pong	乒-{}-乓	Ana
2005	Devil Beside You	惡魔在身邊	Chuang Ya-Li
2006	Angel Lover	天使情人	Sun Chin
2006	What to do with Emmanuelle	艾曼紐要怎樣	Guest appearance
2006	Tokyo Juliet	東方茱麗葉	Gao Gang Quan
2006	Strange School	國光異校	Chi Hsueh-Wei
2006	Taipei Family	住左邊住右邊	Guest appearance
2006	Love Machine	愛情機器	Li Ying-Ai
2008	Memoirs of Madam Jin	金大班	Sheng Yueh-Jung
2010	The Fierce Wife	犀利人妻	He Ailin
2011	Office Girls	小資女孩向前衝	Wei Min Na
2012	Love Actually	半熟戀人	Li Hsiao-Yang
2012	What Is Love	花是愛	Li Yi Hua
2012	Lady Maid Maid	愛情女僕	Han Yingzhi
2013	Amour et Pâtisserie	沒有名字的甜點店	Jin Ni
2013	The Queen!	女王的誕生	Chu Ti
2015	Crime Scene Investigation Center／i Hero	鑑識英雄	Yang Chien
2017	Art in Love	那刻的怦然心動	Professor
2019	Hate the Sin, Love the Sinner	噬罪者	Tang Juan
2019	CSIC: i Hero 2	鑑識英雄II 正義之戰	Yang Chien
2022	Mad Doctor	村裡來了個暴走女外科	Liu Zi-xu
2022	Golden Dream On Green Island	茁劇場－綠島金魂	Believer
2023	My Secret, Terrius	開創者	Wu Ming-Li
2023	Bloody Smart	聰明鎮	
2024	Imperfect Us	不夠善良的我們	
2024	Drink! Idiot	喝酒吧！笨蛋	
Upcoming	Mad Doctor 2	村裡來了個暴走女外科2	Liu Zi-xu

=== Film ===
Year	English title	Mandarin title	Role
2005	Date	約會	
2009	Step by Step	練戀舞	Wu Ju-Ping
2009	Snowfall in Taipei	台北飄雪	Lisa
2010	Comedy Makes You Cry	拍賣春天	Cameo
2011	Mysterious Island	孤島驚魂	Kuan Chih-Chun
2011	The Killer Who Never Kills	殺手歐陽盆栽	Mamasan
2011	Starry Starry Night	星空	Xiao Jie's Mother
2012	The Soul of the Bread	愛的麵包魂	Su Wen-Wen
2012	The Fierce Wife Final Episode	犀利人妻最終回：幸福男·不難	He Ailin
2012	Star of Bethlehem	微光閃亮第一個清晨	
2015	Another Woman	234說愛你	Wang Dan Li
2019	Stand by Me	陪你很久很久	Cameo
2020	Acting Out Of Love	練愛iNG	Janel
2022	Life for Sale	售命	Shen Ching
2023	U Motherbaker – The Movie	我的婆婆怎麼把OO搞丟了	Main Actress
2025	Left-Handed Girl	左撇子女孩	Shu-Fen

=== Television film/miniseries ===
Year	English title	Mandarin title	Role
2012	The Regret	親愛的 我想告訴你	Yin Hsueh-Fei
2015	1 Carat's Roommate	一克拉的室友	Shen Meng-Chih
2016	The Thin Blue Lines	奉子不成婚	Chiang Hsiao-Hsien
2016	We Shouldn't Discuss Love	我們都不應該討論愛情	Xiao Nai
2018	Possession	靈佔	Wang Ya-Lin
2019	Til Death Do Us Part: Perfectly Spotless	鏡文學驚悚劇場 -《打掃》	Landlord's Wife
2019	Binding	4X相識 – 燒肉粽2019	Ah Hsiu
2022	You Have to Kill Me	我是自願讓他殺了我	Lin Ching

=== Music video appearances ===
Year	Artist	Song
1997	Phil Chang	一個人的天荒地老 (Eternity of a Single Person)
1997	Ekin Cheng	偏愛你 (Partial to You)
1999	Jacky Cheung	心如刀割 (Knife Cut to the Heart)
1999	Jacky Cheung	1/2的幸福 (Half of a Blessing)
2004	Kenny Bee	我給的愛 (The Love I Gave)
2005	Sun Yan Ran	是否 (Yes or No)
2011	Misster	鋼鐵人 (Iron Man)
2024	Andrew Tan	走心的歌 (The Sound of Hearts)

== Awards and nominations ==
Year	Award	Category	Nominated work	Result
2011	46th Golden Bell Awards	Best Supporting Actress in a Television Series	The Fierce Wife	Nominated
2015	50th Golden Bell Awards	Best Leading Actress in a Television Series	CSIC: i Hero	Nominated
2019	54th Golden Bell Awards	Best Leading Actress in a Television Series	CSIC: i Hero 2	Nominated
2020	55th Golden Bell Awards	Best Supporting Actress in a Television Series	Hate the Sin, Love the Sinner	Won
2022	57th Golden Bell Awards	Best Leading Actress in a Miniseries or Television Film	You Have To Kill Me	Nominated
2023	58th Golden Bell Awards	Best Leading Actress in a Television Series	Mad Doctor	Won
