= Allison Lin =

Taiwanese actress

- 林予晞
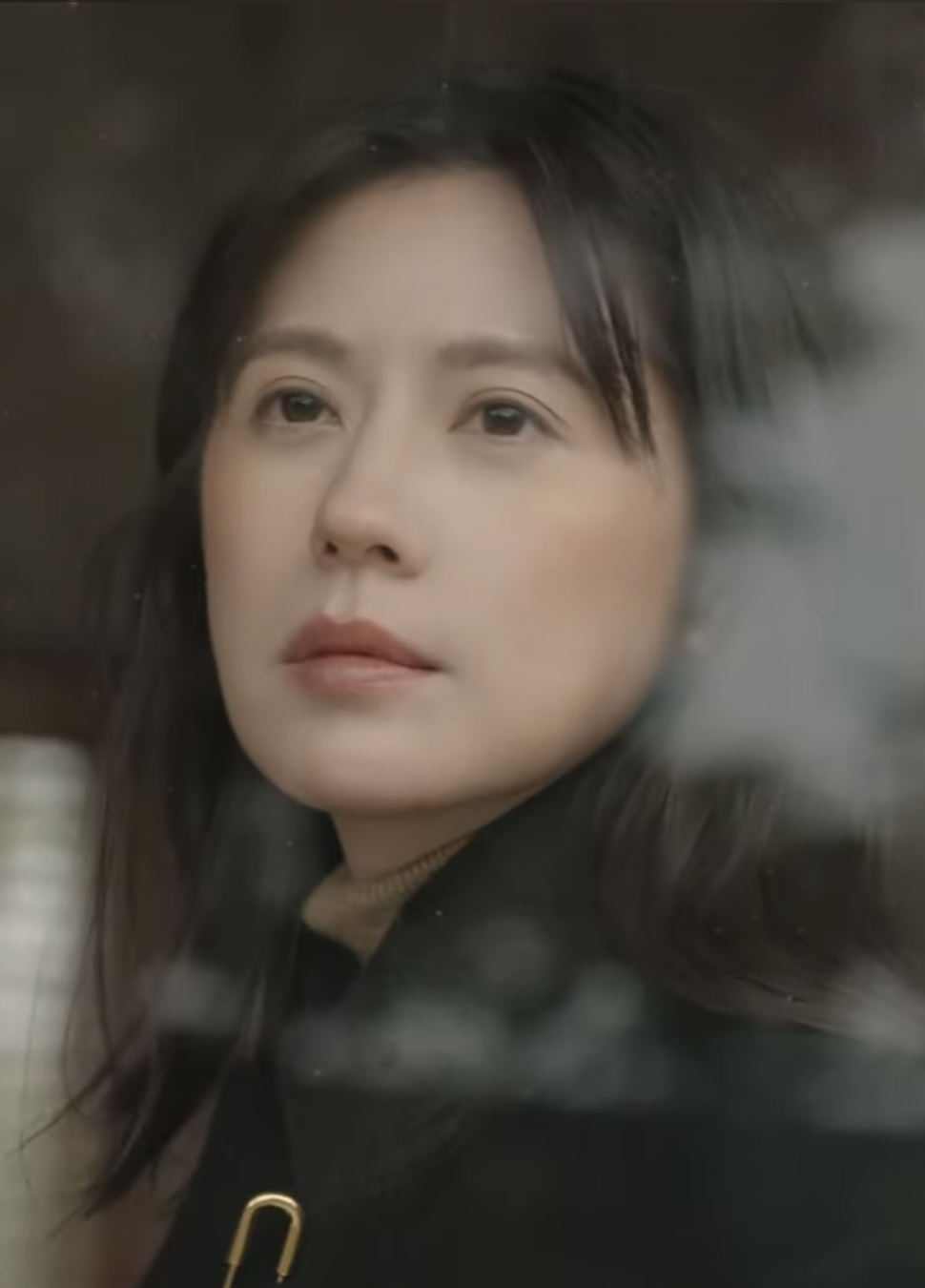
- Lin in December 2025
- Born: 26 January 1985 (age 41); Taipei, Taiwan
- Occupation: actress

Allison Lin (Chinese: 林予晞; pinyin: Lín Yǔxī) is a Taiwanese actress.

== Filmography ==
=== Television series ===
Year	English title	Original title	Role	Notes
2014	Rock N' Road	A咖的路	Guan Guan	
2015	Haru	春梅	Chun Mei	
2015	Love Cuisine	料理高校生	Fang Xiao Rou	
2016	Love By Design	必勝練習生	Li Shu Fen	
2019	The World Between Us	我們與惡的距離	Sung Chiao-ping	
2019	Endless Love	天堂的微笑		
2020	Futmalls.com	預支未來	Bai Yong Li	
2023	Taiwan Crime Stories	台灣犯罪故事	Chiu Wen-qing	
2026	Haunted House Secrets	凶宅專賣店	Chiu Wan-yü	

=== Films ===
Year	Title	Role
2017	Falling in Love	Xiao-Ting
2018	Life of P.W.S.	
2019	Han Dan	Li Wen-Hsuan
2024	Weekend in Taipei	Flight Attendant

== Awards and nominations ==
Year	Award	Category	Nominated work	Result
2023	58th Golden Bell Awards	Best Leading Actress in a Television Series	Taiwan Crime Stories - Derailment	Nominated
