= Patrick Lee (actor) =

Taiwanese actor (born 1979)

- 李沛旭
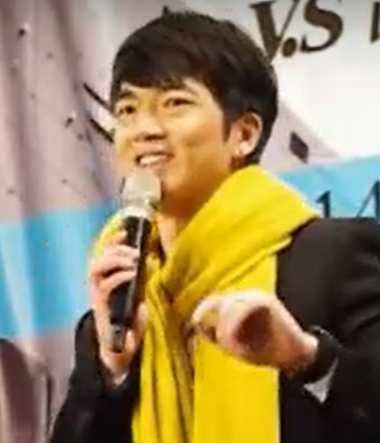
- Lee in February 2012
- Born: Lee Pei-hsu; 7 November 1979 (age 46); Taiwan
- Education: Fu Jen Catholic University (BA)
- Occupations: Actor; bodybuilding coach
- Years active: 2002–present

Patrick Lee Pei-hsu (Chinese: 李沛旭; born 7 November 1979) is a Taiwanese actor. He began his career on television and rose to prominence with his roles as Hao Kangde in The Fierce Wife (2010) and Shi Te-long in Office Girls (2011–12), followed by a lead role as Nakamura Kouhei in the period drama series Haru (2015). He has also appeared in the Singaporean crime series Gifted (2018), and the French-Taiwanese action film Weekend in Taipei (2024).

== Early life and education ==
Lee was born on 7 November 1979. He studied at the Affiliated Senior High School of National Taiwan Normal University and was a member of the school's dance club. He then attended Fu Jen Catholic University and graduated with a Bachelor of Arts in textile design. He began working as a model during his university years.

== Career ==
While working as a model in his university years, Lee was spotted by talent agency EeLin Entertainment and signed as an artist following his graduation. He made his acting debut in 2002 with a minor role in the comedy series Hot College Students. He received his first series regular role in the 2003 series 1 Asabulu and went on to take on supporting roles on television. He landed his first lead role in the 2005 medical drama Beauty Clinic, and appeared in the 2008 and 2009 romantic comedy series Fated to Love You and My Queen.

Lee's breakout role came as Hao Kangde in the 2010 romance series The Fierce Wife, playing a cheating husband with a glib tongue. He later reprised the role in the 2012 spin-off film The Fierce Wife Final Episode. Starting in 2011, Lee took on a lead role as Shi Te-long in the comedy series Office Girls, portraying a mean-spirited and sycophantic department store employee. This became one of Lee's most iconic roles, and his bilingual acting style of incorporating English words into Chinese dialogue became his signature. Lee had a small role as Brother Nuo in the 2012 Singaporean action film Imperfect, and received another lead role in the 2015 period drama Haru, playing the antagonistic Japanese detective Nakamura Kouhei. Lee subsequently landed main roles in the drama series People Life, Ocean Wild and the romance series Just For You, as well as the Singaporean crime series Gifted.

In 2020, Lee left EeLin Entertainment and announced a career switch to become a bodybuilding coach. He signed with Catwalk Production House the following year to pursue a career in feature films. Lee starred in the 2023 Singaporean horror film Circle Line, and as Bolo in the 2024 French-Taiwanese action film Weekend in Taipei.

== Personal life ==
Lee began dating his The Fierce Wife co-star Janel Tsai in 2011, and they broke up in 2020 after Tsai revealed that their relationship had deteriorated due to her health problems that emerged in 2016. Lee announced his marriage with a Chinese-Thai woman in July 2022.

== Filmography ==
=== Film ===
Year	Title	Role	Notes/Ref.
2012	The Fierce Wife Final Episode	Hao Kangde (郝康德)	
2012	Imperfect	Brother Nuo (諾哥)	
2015	Baby Steps	Danny's brother	
2019	Big Three Dragons	Sky Bird Brother (天鳥哥)	
2023	Circle Line	Ah Nam	
2024	Weekend in Taipei	Bolo	

=== Television ===
Year	Title	Role	Notes/Ref.
2002	Hot College Students	Student	Guest role
2003	1 Asabulu	Hsiao-pao (小炮)	Recurring role
2005	Beauty Clinic	Chou Hsi-lang (周喜郎)	Main role
2008	Fated to Love You	Gu Chi (古馳)	Recurring role
2009	My Queen	Wei Er-Kang (魏爾剛)	Recurring role
2010	The Fierce Wife	Hao Kangde	Recurring role
2010	Zhong Wu Yan	Lin Gai-shi (林蓋世)	Recurring role
2011	Somewhere Over The Sky	Senior official	Guest role
2011–2012	Office Girls	Shi Te-Long (史特龍)	Main role
2012	The Songs Of Soil	Mr. Shiraishi	Recurring role
2012	In Between	Meng Ke-Wei (孟克偉)	Recurring role
2012	Wo Men Fa Cai Le	Cheng Jian-ting (程建廷)	Main role
2013	Love SOS	Hsiao Hsang-feng (邵翔風)	Main role
2014	Fabulous 30	Edison	Guest role
2014	Pleasantly Surprised	Food critic	Guest role
2014	Say I Love You	Yi Jun's ex-boss	Cameo
2015	Aries	Chang Chia-Ming (張家明)	Main role
2015	Haru	Nakamura Kouhei	Main role
2016	A Good Day	Brother Niu (紐哥)	Cameo
2016	People Life, Ocean Wild	Wei Huan (魏歡)	Main role
2016	The Legend of Flying Daggers	Tai Po (泰普)	Recurring role
2017	Just For You	Chiao Kai-Teng (喬楷騰)	Main role
2018	Gifted	Guan Dezhi (關得志)	Main role
2018	Mermaid Sauna	A Bu (阿布)	Main role
2018	The Sound of Happiness	Liu Da-wei (劉大為)	Guest role
2019	Best Interest	Wang Cheng-Min (汪正民)	Cameo
2021	Tears on Fire	Sun Zheng-hong (孫正弘)	Cameo
TBA	Demonic World	TBA	Main role
