= Circle Line (film) =

Singaporean horror film

- Pre-release Circle Line Movie Poster
- Traditional Chinese: 生死環線
- Simplified Chinese: 生死环线
- Directed by: JD Chua
- Produced by: Juan Foo; Toong Soo Wei; Kent Chan
- Starring: Jesseca Liu; Peter Yu; Andie Chen; Patrick Lee; Alan Tan; Johnny Ng; Nathaniel Ng; Ashley Seow
- Production companies: Taipan Films; mm2 Entertainment
- Distributed by: mm2 Film Distribution
- Release date: 5 January 2023 (Singapore)
- Running time: 80 Minutes
- Country: Singapore
- Language: Mandarin
- Budget: 3 million

Circle Line (Chinese: simplified Chinese: 生死环线; traditional Chinese: 生死環線; pinyin: Shēngsǐ huánxiàn) is a 2023 Singaporean film. It is billed as Singapore's first modern-day creature feature, produced by Taipan Films and mm2 Entertainment, directed by JD Chua and stars Jesseca Liu, Peter Yu, Andie Chen and Patrick Lee.

== Synopsis ==
In a Southeast Asian city, an error in the subway's automated systems causes the last train for the night to veer off-course into a series of old, abandoned tunnels. Among the passengers are a single mother traumatized by the death of her husband in an accident, her young son and the estranged teenaged daughter of the subway's chief engineer. Discovering that the train's signal has completely disappeared, the night shift of the train system's central command mounts a rescue operation as a mysterious creature that made its home within the abandoned tunnels begins attacking the passengers.

== Cast ==
- Jesseca Liu as Yi Ling
- Peter Yu as Bo Seng
- Andie Chen as Calvin
- Patrick Lee as Ah Nam
- Alan Tan as Heng
- Johnny Ng as Uncle Choo
- Nathaniel Ng as Lucas, the son of Yi Ling.
- Ashley Seow as Janice

== Production ==
The film is a Singaporean project developed by Taipan Films and jointly produced with mm2 Entertainment. Featuring a mainly Singaporean ensemble cast led by Jesseca Liu, Peter Yu and Andie Chen, where production had access to actual trains, train stations and the train depot operated by Rapid KL. A number of film sets were also built specially for the film, including train tunnels, control rooms, caverns and sewers, at sound stages at Iskandar Malaysia Studios in Johor Bahru, Malaysia. Lead designs, pre-visualization and visual effects were undertaken by Omens Studios in Singapore, while final post-production was done at Kantana Post in Bangkok, Thailand.

Principal photography took place in 2018, with completion of visual effects in late 2019. The effects of the COVID-19 pandemic on the local and worldwide film market led to the delay of the intended release of the movie in 2020. The producers used the lull in the market to re-edit the film for a final release cut in late 2022.

== Release ==
The film released to cinemas in Singapore and Malaysia on 5 January 2023.
