= Weekend in Taipei =

2024 French-Taiwanese film by George Huang

- Theatrical release poster
- Directed by: George Huang
- Written by: George Huang; Luc Besson
- Produced by: Luc Besson; Virginie Besson-Silla
- Starring: Luke Evans; Gwei Lun-mei; Sung Kang
- Cinematography: Colin Wandersman
- Edited by: Lucas Fabiani
- Music by: Matteo Locasculli
- Production companies: EuropaCorp; Huayu International Entertainment
- Distributed by: EuropaCorp (France); Cai Chang Asia (Taiwan)
- Release dates: 1 September 2024 (Vieshow Cinemas Xinyi); 25 September 2024 (France/Taiwan)
- Running time: 101 minutes
- Countries: France; Taiwan
- Language: English
- Box office: $2.8 million

Weekend in Taipei is a 2024 action thriller film directed by George Huang and co-written with Luc Besson. Starring Luke Evans, Gwei Lun-mei, and Sung Kang, the film is a co-production between France and Taiwan, produced and distributed by EuropaCorp with support from the Taipei Film Commission, and was filmed and set in Taipei, Taiwan. Its plot centers around an American DEA agent (Evans) who reunites with a Taipei-based mercenary driver (Gwei) and becomes entangled in a romantic relationship with her.

Weekend in Taipei had its world premiere at the Vieshow Cinemas Xinyi in Taipei, Taiwan on 1 September 2024, and was released in France and Taiwan on 25 September 2024. The film received mixed reviews from critics, who praised the action sequences and performances, but criticized the screenplay and character development.

== Plot ==
John Lawlor, a DEA agent who goes undercover at a Chinese restaurant in Minneapolis to gather evidence of drug trafficking by a billionaire and disguised seafood merchant named Kwang, is forced to break cover due to a mistake by his colleague, rendering half a year of his undercover work in vain. However, he receives an email from an anonymous informant in Taipei who claims to possess the ledger of Kwang Enterprises. John informs his supervisor, but the claim is dismissed as a hoax, and John's request to follow the lead is rejected, with his supervisor even forcing him to take a weekend leave to keep him away from the case. Undeterred, John decides to travel to Taipei during this time under a fake identity.

Meanwhile, in Taipei, Kwang discovers that his adoptive son, Raymond, is the mole who stole his ledger. Raymond, unaware of Kwang's drug dealing, believes the ledger documents Kwang Enterprises' involvement in killing dolphins and intends to expose his father's role in environmental pollution. Joey, Kwang's wife who was forced to marry him 15 years ago for protection, pleads for her son's life. However, Raymond reveals that he has already entrusted the ledger to a friend, who is delivering it to DEA agent John at Marriott Taipei. Kwang sends his men to recover the ledger, but as he attempts to dismember Raymond as punishment, he is knocked out by Joey and Raymond. The mother and son then head to the hotel, intending to warn the DEA agents. Since Raymond gives Kwang the wrong room number, they reach John first and reveal that Joey and John know each other. Before Joey can explain the situation, Kwang's men arrive, leading to a shootout between the two factions. John's companions are all shot dead, and the ledger is seized, but John manages to escape with Joey and Raymond.

After evading both Kwang's men and the police, Joey brings John and Raymond to the fishing village where she grew up, seeking refuge at her grandmother's house. She reveals that John is actually Raymond's father, shocking both of them. John confronts Joey, whom he met while undercover as a drug trafficker 15 years ago, revealing his true identity to her after falling in love and helping her escape. Joey reveals that she was pregnant at that time but did not have the chance to tell John before leaving, and she was heartbroken to realize that John had been lying to her all along. He apologizes and promises never to leave her and Raymond again, leading to their reconciliation. Meanwhile, Raymond realizes that a rhino miniature on Kwang's desk is actually a flash drive containing a digital version of his ledger. Despite his parents' objections, he sneaks out of the village to return home and steal Kwang's flash drive but is caught by Kwang.

Kwang holds Raymond hostage and calls Joey and John to negotiate. John offers to exchange their lives, and the two factions agree to meet in Ximending. However, Kwang breaks his promise during the meeting, refusing to release Raymond and abducting Joey instead. Just before his men execute John, he outmaneuvers them and takes down all of Kwang's enforcers. He then navigates the complex alleys and catches up with Kwang's escaping vehicle, kicking Kwang out and forcing him to flee on foot. The chase continues, culminating in a fight at a theater, where John subdues Kwang and has him arrested by the arriving police.

Reuniting with Joey and Raymond, the family reconciles and takes a trip to Paris, where Joey reveals that she is pregnant with their second child.

== Cast ==
- Luke Evans as John Lawlor, an American DEA agent
- Gwei Lun-mei as Joey, a top Taipei-based mercenary driver
- Sung Kang as Kwang, the leader of a drug cartel
- Wyatt Yang as Raymond, Joey and John's son
- Pernell Walker as Charlotte Fields, John's DEA supervisor
- Tuo Tsung-hua as Deputy Liu, a Taiwanese police detective
- Lu Yi-ching as Po-po, Joey's grandmother
- Patrick Lee as Bolo, Kwang's bodyguard and right-hand man

Also appearing in the film are Andy Wu and Fay Wu as Kwang's assistants; Janet Hsieh cameos as a woman witnessing Joey's pregnancy test in the restroom; while Allison Lin cameos as a flight attendant.

== Production ==
=== Development ===
In 2013, director Luc Besson and producer Virginie Besson-Silla filmed the French sci-fi film Lucy in Taiwan. The duo was impressed by the cityscape and asserted they would to return for another project. In 2022, Taiwanese-American director George Huang conceived a film about a female mercenary driver set in Asia and approached Luc Besson to help develop the project. Initially set in Hong Kong, the project became unavailable due to shifts in funding. Besson then suggested that Huang change the setting to Taipei. Huang and the Bessons, along with director Olivier Megaton, went to Taipei for location scouting in February 2023, and met with Taipei City mayor Chiang Wan-an, who announced that the film would be supported by the Taipei City Government and the Taipei Film Commission would join the production. The scout spanned fourteen days, after which Huang agreed to use Taipei as the backdrop and revised the screenplay accordingly.

Under the working title Weekend Escape Project, the film was announced to be produced by EuropaCorp in June 2023, with Luke Evans and Gwei Lun-mei cast as the lead actors. The film marks EuropaCorp's first production after the company's financial restructuring and a four-year hiatus. In August, Korean-American actor Sung Kang joined the cast. In March 2024, the distribution rights in North America were acquired by Ketchup Entertainment. In August, an official trailer was released, with Patrick Lee revealed to be part of the cast.

=== Filming ===
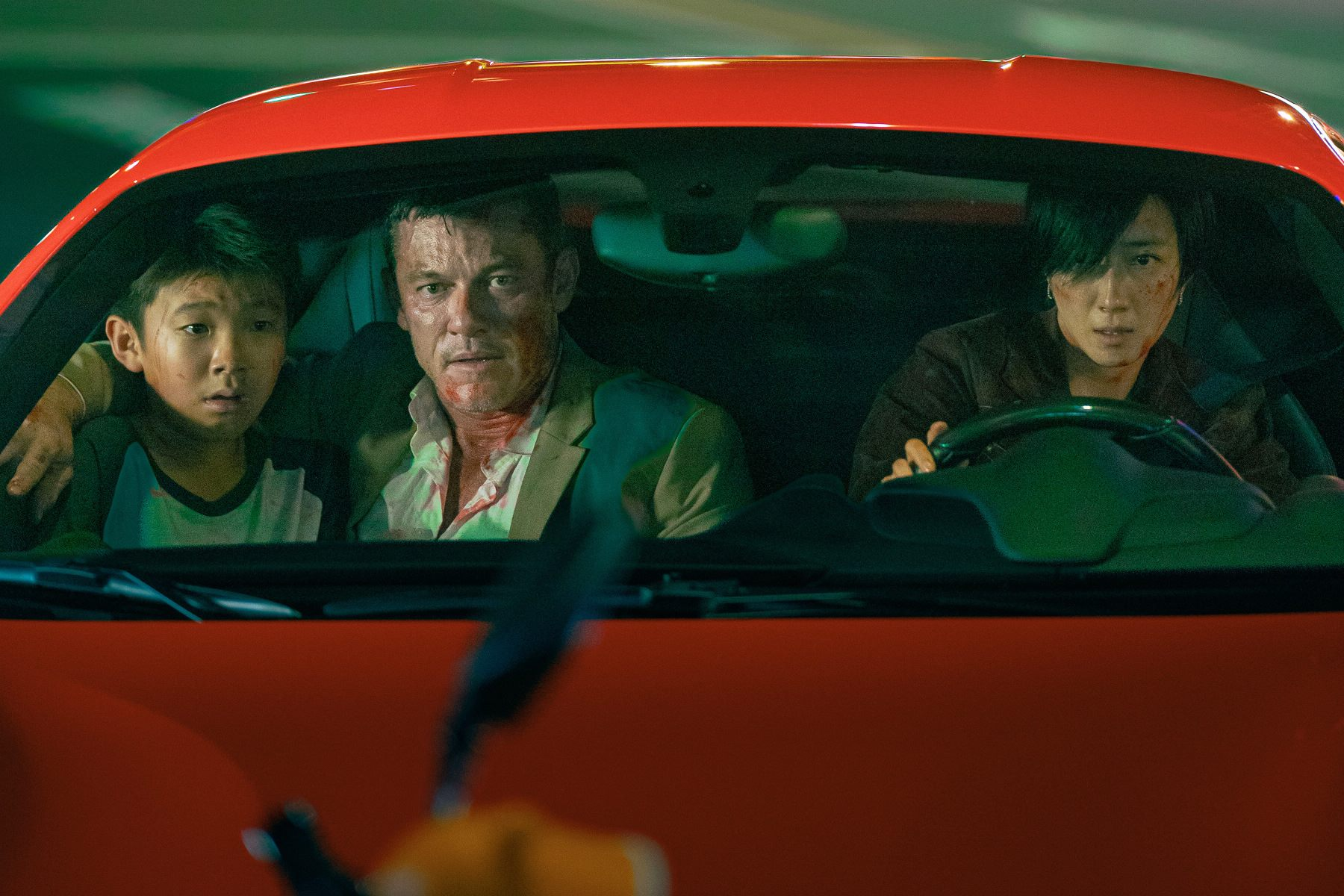
A film still from Weekend in Taipei

Principal photography began on 3 July 2023 in Taipei and was expected to span across three months, with Evans arriving in Taiwan to prepare for the shoot in June. The entire filming crew was composed of Taiwanese filmmakers. Location shooting in Taipei took place at various sites, including Zhongshan Hall, Lions' Plaza Commercial Building, and Luoyang Car Park in Wanhua District; the Taipei Performing Arts Center, Shezi Bridge, and Guandu Nature Park in Shilin District; Taipei Dome, Taipei 101, and Taipei City Hall in Xinyi District; Taipei Arena in Songshan District; and Taipei Music Center in Nangang District. On 15 July, Daniel Wu and Janet Hsieh were seen with the cast in Neihu District, Taipei. Production moved to Keelung on 25 July, where a car chase scene was shot near Dawulun Beach, as well as at the Aodi Fishing Harbor. On 11 August, filming took place at the Grand Victoria Hotel in Zhongshan District.

Shooting then occurred on American Street in Ximending on 22 August, with Besson and Kang spotted on set. Additional scenes were captured in Datong District and Daan District, and the entire production filed a total of twelve road closure applications, including closing the Ziqiang Tunnel to film a car crash scene, making it the most applied-for film in Taiwan's history. Most of the interior scenes were filmed at Marriott Taipei, where the foreign cast and crew stayed during the shoot, with the hotel mainly being used as the setting for a business tower, as well as the characters' homes and offices. Filming ultimately concluded on 29 August.

== Release ==
Weekend in Taipei had its world premiere at Vieshow Cinemas Xinyi in Taipei, Taiwan on 1 September 2024, followed by a theatrical release in France and Taiwan on 25 September. The film was subsequently released on 8 November in North America by Ketchup Entertainment.

== Reception ==
=== Box office ===
Weekend in Taipei debuted at the top of Taiwan's weekly box office, but fell to fifth place in its second week, grossing NTD$6.68 million (US$206,000) and achieving an accumulated total of NTD$40.58 million (US$1.25 million). Internationally, the film opened in the United States and Canada with US$360,000 from 1,021 theaters in its first weekend, for which Deadline Hollywood described the figures as "lackluster".

=== Critical response ===
On the review aggregator website Rotten Tomatoes, 55% of 22 critics' reviews are positive, with an average rating of 5.8/10.

Dennis Harvey of Variety described Weekend in Taipei as a "familiar, formulaic but fun action-thriller", offering a throwback to boilerplate action films with energetic chase scenes and a light-hearted tone, but ultimately lacking depth and memorability. Mae Abdulbaki of Screen Rant described the film as "charming, well-shot, thrilling, and, above all, entertaining", noting that while the characters may lack depth and memorability, the "game cast and thrilling action sequences", along with a "surprising amount of humor", provide a refreshing and engaging viewing experience.

James Marsh of South China Morning Post gave the film 2/5 stars, observing that despite Gwei Lun-mei's "captivating" performance and the abundance of action, it was "repeatedly bogged down by unnecessary backstory and exposition", and he suggested that "budgetary constraints or simply a lack of creativity" contributed to its failure to deliver the aesthetics commonly found in Luc Besson's works. Christy Lemire of RogerEbert.com rated the film 2.5/4 stars, describing it as a "B-movie straight out of the 1990s" with "solid" and "over-the-top" action sequences, but criticized its "hilariously stupid" dialogue and lack of character development, which rendered it ultimately forgettable.

Estella Huang of Mirror Media described the film as a "Hollywood-level action film" that presents Taipei's beautiful cityscape, but criticizes it for its thin storyline and underdeveloped emotional relationships, ultimately simplifying the complexity of its romantic and familial themes into basic dialogue and action sequences. Berton Hsu, writing for The News Lens, considered the film as a commercially driven popcorn movie aimed at global appeal, noting that while it features compelling action and thrilling vibes, it lacks authenticity and misrepresents Taiwan with a convoluted plot.
