= Office Girls =

- Promotional poster
- Also known as: 小資女孩向前衝
- Genre: romance, comedy
- Created by: SETTV
- Written by: Luo Cai Yu 羅彩渝; Lu Li Li 羅立麗; Fang Yi De 方懿德
- Directed by: Xu Fu Jun 徐輔軍
- Starring: Ko Chia-yen; Roy Chiu; Tia Li; Patrick Lee; Kuo Shu-yao; James Wen; Janel Tsai
- Opening theme: "Don’t, Don’t" by Genie Chuo
- Ending theme: "Add A Little Happiness" by Yisa Yu
- Country of origin: Taiwan
- Original languages: Mandarin; Taiwanese Hokkien
- No. of seasons: 1
- No. of episodes: 40

Production
- Executive producers: Pan Bo Xuan 潘博軒; Wu Chang Pei 吳長沛
- Producers: Hu Ning Yuan 胡寧遠; Xie Yi Sheng 謝益勝
- Production location: Taiwan
- Running time: 90 minutes
- Production companies: Sanlih E-Television; Cai Xiang Television Ltd.

Original release
- Network: TTV Main Channel
- Release: 21 August 2011 – 12 February 2012

Related
- Love You; Love Forward

Office Girls (traditional Chinese: 小資女孩向前衝; simplified Chinese: 小资女孩向前冲, literally "Working-Girl Forward"), is a 2011 Taiwanese drama starring Roy Chiu, Ko Chia-yen, James Wen, Tia Li, and Patrick Lee. It started filming in July 2011.

It was first broadcast in Taiwan on free-to-air channel Taiwan Television (TTV) every Sunday at 22:00 from 21 August 2011, and cable TV SET Metro every Saturday at 22:00 from 28 August 2011.

== Synopsis ==
Shen Xing Ren (Ko Chia-yen) is a staff member in the Operations Department of Jing Shi Department Store. At age 25, she has worked there for four years. She is tasked with training and mentoring Qin Zi Qi (Roy Chiu), 28, a new entry-level member of the Sales Department. Unbeknownst to her and almost everyone else there, Zi Qi is the son of Qin Mu Bai (Shen Meng Sheng/沈孟生), the Chairman of Jing Shi Department Store. Zi Qi's father has challenged him to a test to prove he deserves to lead Jing Shi Department Store - Zi Qi will have to live on a lowly entry-level salary for one year, without the luxuries he is used to, and cannot reveal his true identity.

Xing Ren and Zi Qi clash immediately - she is frugal and hardworking, saving every cent to buy a house in Taipei for her and her mother. He is careless and used to living large and spending big. She is extremely loyal to Jing Shi Department Store and is content with her job. He thinks the department store needs to clean house and get rid of corrupt senior management who are stuck in inefficient ways.

To improve sales, Xing Ren suggests inviting her idol Yu Cheng Feng (James Wen), a handsome and internationally-renown designer, to set up a counter in their store. Despite Yu Cheng Feng having publicly stated that his designs would never be sold in department stores, Xing Ren (with Zi Qi tagging along) sets out to get him to accept their proposal. After a lot of hard work on Xing Ren's part, a business relationship is created between Yu and the department store.

Zi Qi is initially attracted to Zheng Kai Er (Tia Li), the lovely and clever assistant manager in the Merchants Department. Kai Er suspects and later discovers Zi Qi's true identity. She tentatively agrees to date him but is increasingly jealous of the growing relationship between Zi Qi and Xing Ren. Kai Er tries to ruin the relationship between the two on a number of occasions. Zi Qi and Xing Ren, despite their constant bickering, gradually realize they care for each other and begin dating.

Later Zi Qi's indulgent mother returns to Taiwan from the United States. She tries to force Zi Qi's father to promote him to Executive Vice President but backs down when Zi Qi convinces her that his father is right to challenge him. He has become accustomed to his new life, drawing inspiration from Xing Ren's example. Zi Qi's mother initially disapproves of Xing Ren, who she feels is beneath Zi Qi, but comes to accept her.

When Zi Qi's identity is revealed early during a heated argument, Xing Ren is upset that he lied to her and devastated by the resulting gossip. She eventually forgives him after a cooling off period working with the Yu's in Paris. The series ends with Xing Ren and Zi Qi's wedding.

== Cast ==
=== Main characters ===
| Actor | Character | Description |
|---|---|---|
| Roy Chiu | Qin Zi Qi | Shen Xing Ren's lover |
| Ko Chia-yen | Shen Xing Ren | Qin Zi Qi 's lover |
| James Wen | Yu Cheng Feng | World-famous designer |
| Tia Lee | Zheng Kai Er | Assistant Manager (later Manager) of Merchants Department at Jing Shi Department Store |
| Janel Tsai | Wei Min Na | Supermodel; Yu Cheng Feng's girlfriend |
| Kuo Shu-yao | Liu Yu Le | Xing Ren's roommate; works in the HR department at Jing Shi Department Store |
| Patrick Lee | Shi Te Long | Manager of Sales Department at Jing Shi Department Store |

=== Others ===
| Actor | Character | Description |
| (沈孟生) | Qin Mu Bai (秦慕白) | Commissioner/ Director of Jing Shi Department Store; Zi Qi's father |
| (林秀君) | Ye Hua (葉華) | President Director of Jing Shi Department Store; Zi Qi's mother |
| (陸一龍) | (涂金泉) | General manager of Jing Shi Department Store |
| Lang Tzu-yun | Fon Ren Yue (封仁月) | Vice general manager of Jing Shi Department Store "Administration Department" |
| (趙正平) | Hu Jian Chong (胡建中) | Vice general manager of Jing Shi Department Store "Investment Department" |
| (顏嘉樂) | (褚湘蘭) | Vice general manager of Jing Shi Department Store "Operation Department" |
| (綠茶) | Lu Cha (綠茶) | Xing Ren's coworker in the Sales Department at Jing Shi Department Store |
| (小8) | Mandy (蔓蒂) | Xing Ren's coworker in the Sales Department at Jing Shi Department Store |
| Frankie Huang | Kelly's husband | |
| Morris Rong | Aniki | Boss of Japanese Mafia |
| Mondo Otani | xiaodi 1 | Japanese Mafia |
| Yukiya Oonishi | xiaodi 2 | Japanese Mafia |

== Soundtrack ==
Office Girls Original TV Soundtrack (OST)

Soundtrack album by Various artists
- Released: 21 February 2012
- Genre: Mandopop
- Language: Mandarin
- Labels: Rock Records (TW) 滾石國際音樂股份有限公司

Office Girls Original TV Soundtrack (OST) (小資女孩向前衝 電視原聲帶) was released on February 21, 2012 by various artists under Rock Records (TW) label. It contains 18 tracks total. The opening theme is track 1 "Don’t, Don’t 不要不要" by Genie Chuo 卓文萱. The closing theme is track 4 "Add A Little Happiness 微加幸福" by Yisa Yu 郁可唯.

=== Track listing ===
| No. | Title | Singer(s) | Length |
|---|---|---|---|
| 1. | "Don’t, Don’t" (不要不要) | Genie Chuo | 3:34 |
| 2. | "Good Friends Are Only Just" (好朋友只是朋友) | Yisa Yu | 4:20 |
| 3. | "Petty Men Rushed Forward (OT:Add A Little Happiness)" (小資女孩向前衝 (OT:微加幸福)) | Instrumental | 3:04 |
| 4. | "Add A Little Happiness" (微加幸福) | Yisa Yu | 4:40 |
| 5. | "Take Two Steps Back Three Steps (OT:Don’t, Don’t)" (走兩步退三步 (OT:不要不要)) | Instrumental | 3:29 |
| 6. | "Wanna Fly In Free Fall" (想飛的自由落體) | Genie Chuo | 4:36 |
| 7. | "Silly (OT:Good Friends Are Only Just)" (好傻 (OT:好朋友只是朋友）) | Instrumental | 3:26 |
| 8. | "Can’t Afford To Get Hurt" (傷不起) | Yisa Yu | 3:56 |
| 9. | "I Promise You (OT:Wanna Fly In Free Fall)" (我答應妳 (OT:想飛的自由落體)) | Instrumental | 3:06 |
| 10. | "Enough" (夠了) | Genie Chuo | 4:08 |
| 11. | "White Lie (OT:Don’t, Don’t)" (善意的謊言 (OT:不要不要)) | Instrumental | 3:08 |
| 12. | "Happiness Person (OT:Add A Little Happiness)" (杏福奇緣 (OT:微加幸福)) | Instrumental | 3:26 |
| 13. | "Never" (永不) | "Q" Wu 吳忠明 | 3:40 |
| 14. | "I Still Love You (OT:Can’t Afford To Get Hurt)" (我還愛著你 (OT:傷不起)) | Instrumental | 3:11 |
| 15. | "Cheers For The Friendship (OT:Enough)" (為友誼乾杯 （OT:夠了)) | Instrumental | 3:12 |
| 16. | "Too Calm" (太冷靜) | "Q" Wu 吳忠明 | 3:12 |
| 17. | "First Date (OT:Never)" (第一次的約會 (OT:永不)) | Instrumental | 3:12 |
| 18. | "Please Forgive My Naive (OT:Too Calm)" (請原諒我的幼稚 (OT:太冷靜)) | Instrumental | 3:17 |

== Publications ==
Office Girls Photobook (小資女孩向前衝 職場生存之道)
- Book cover image
- Author: Sanlih E-Television 三立電視監製
- Genre: Photobook
- Published: 21 December 2011
- Publication place: Taiwan
- Media type: Print paperback
- Pages: 128
- ISBN: 9789862874325

* 21 December 2011 : Office Girls Photobook (小資女孩向前衝 職場生存之道) - ISBN 9789862874325 - Author: Sanlih E-Television 三立電視監製 - Publisher: KADOKAWA Media (Taiwan) 台灣角川

A 128 page photobook was published in 2011 detailing production details of the drama. The book was published before the completion of the drama.

* 24 September 2011 : Office Girls Original Novel (小資女孩向前衝 原創小說) - ISBN 9789862874332 - Author: Sanlih E-Television 三立電視監製 & Zhu Liang Yun Ru 著梁蘊如 - Publisher: KADOKAWA Media (Taiwan) 台灣角川

A novel based on the drama was published detailing the entire story line of the drama. Spoilers are revealed in the novel before the drama finished airing.

== DVD release ==
* 2 February 2012 :Office Girls (Part I) (DVD) (Taiwan Version) - DVD All Region - Disc: 4 DVDs (Ep.1-12) - Publisher: Cai Chang International Multimedia Inc. (TW)

Official Taiwan version of the drama DVD set part 1 showing episode 1 to 12, comes in original Mandarin language and Chinese subtitles only.

* 30 March 2012 :Office Girls (Part II) (DVD) (Taiwan Version) - DVD All Region - Disc: 5 DVDs (Ep.13-25) - Publisher: Cai Chang International Multimedia Inc. (TW)

Official Taiwan version of the drama DVD set part 2 showing episode 13 to 25, comes in original Mandarin language and Chinese subtitles only.

== Broadcast ==
| Network | Country | Airing Date | Timeslot |
|---|---|---|---|
| TTV | Taiwan | August 21, 2011 | Sunday 10:00-11:30 pm |
| SETTV | Taiwan | August 27, 2011 | Saturday 10:00-11:30 pm |
| SETTV | Taiwan | January 7, 2012 | Saturday 10:30 pm–12:00 am |
| ETTV | Taiwan | October 29, 2012 | Monday to Friday 11:00 pm–12:00 am |
| Astro Quan Jia HD | Malaysia | March 9, 2012 | Monday to Friday 10:30-11:30 pm |
| StarHub TV | Singapore | October 30, 2011 | Sunday 8:00-9:30 pm |
| StarHub TV | Singapore | December 24, 2011 | Saturday 8:00-9:30 pm |
| TVB J2 | Hong Kong | February 25, 2012 | February 25, 2012 7:30-9:30 pm |

=== International broadcast ===
- Bolivia: Red Uno (2015)
- Chile: Vía X (2014)
- Ecuador: Ecuavisa (2016)
- Japan: DATV (2012), as Susume! Kirameki joshi (進め!キラメキ女子)
- Latin America: Mundo Drama (streaming), ViX (streaming, 2022-)
- Panama: SERTV (2017)
- United States: Pasiones TV (Spanish), Hulu, Netflix & Ultra Familia

== Episode ratings ==
Competing dramas on rival channels airing at the same time slot were:
- FTV - Hayate the Combat Butler, In Time with You
- CTS - They Are Flying, Ring Ring Bell
- CTV - Love Keeps GoingLove Recipe

Taiwan Television (TTV) Ratings (Partial list)
| Original Broadcast Date | Episode # | Episode Name | Average | Timeslot Rank | Section Peak (every 15 mins) | Remark |
|---|---|---|---|---|---|---|
| 21 August 2011 | Day 1 | I earned NT$1,000,000! (我賺到100萬啦！) | 2.78 | 1 | | Peak: 3.78 |
| 28 August 2011 | Day 2 | Slowly climbing up! (一步一步往上爬！) | 3.44 | 1 | | CTV Love Keeps Going finale Peak: 4.56 |
| 4 September 2011 | Day 3 | Be careful of surprise attacks! (人紅招忌 小心暗器！) | 3.48 | 1 | | CTV Love Recipe premiere |
| 11 September 2011 | Day 4 | God! Where are you? (上帝啊！祢到底在哪裡？) | 3.72 | 1 | | FTV Hayate the Combat Butler finale Peak: 5.23 |
| 18 September 2011 | Day 5 | I promise you, I will eat broccoli! (我答應妳 我以後會吃花椰菜！) | 4.16 | 1 | | FTV In Time with You premiere Peak: 7.69 |
| 25 September 2011 | Day 6 | I will lend you my shoulder! (我的肩膀借妳靠啦！) | 4.54 | 1 | | CTS They Are Flying finale |
| 2 October 2011 | Day 7 | I actually like Qin Zi Qi? (我喜歡秦子奇？) | 4.40 | 1 | | CTS Ring Ring Bell premiere |
| 9 October 2011 | Day 8 | Kneel down and apologise, sorry! (跪下 道歉 對不起) | 4.68 | 1 | | |
| 16 October 2011 | Day 9 | I actually like Shen Xing Ren? (我喜歡沈杏仁？) | 5.17 | 1 | | Peak: 6.42 |
| 23 October 2011 | Day 10 | Love and Hatred (多情 多恨 情慾的世界) | 4.89 | 1 | 5.21 | |
| 30 October 2011 | Day 11 | You belong to me, but who do I belong to? (你是我的 那我是誰的？) | 5.35 | 1 | 6.84 | |
| 6 November 2011 | Day 12 | Do not let true love turn into regret (不要讓真愛 變成遺憾) | 5.97 | 1 | 7.58 | CTV Love Recipe final |
| 13 November 2011 | Day 13 | How to increase happiness in love (怎麼在愛裡 微加幸福) | 5.56 | 1 | 5.87 | Peak:7.06 |
| 20 November 2011 | Day 14 | Congratulations, Shen Xing Ren, you won the top prize (沈杏仁 恭喜妳中頭獎) | 5.35 | 1 | 5.70 | |
| 27 November 2011 | Day 15 | Men's soup and ladies' soup (男湯 女湯) | 5.05 | 1 | 5.51 | |
| 4 December 2011 | Day 16 | Are white lies okay? (善意的謊言行不行？) | 5.05 | 1 | | |
| 11 December 2011 | Day 17 | The cutest men are the hardworking ones (認真上進的男生才最可愛) | 4.66 | 2 | 5.29 | FTV In Time with You Finale |
| 18 December 2011 | Day 18 | Silly or naive (好傻還是好天真) | 5.78 | 1 | 6.21 | |
| 25 December 2011 | Day 19 | Don't tell me lies again! (以後不要 再對我說謊了！) | 5.28 | 1 | | |
| 1 January 2012 | Day 20 | I'll do something about the money! (錢的事情 我自己想辦法！) | 5.87 | 1 | 6.37 | |
| 8 January 2012 | Day 21 | Objection overruled! (反對無效！) | 5.49 | 1 | | |
| 15 January 2012 | Day 22 | He's the future takeover boss! (他是未來公司的接班人！) | 6.50 | 1 | 7.37 | Peak:8.11 |
No broadcast on 22 January 2012 due to Lunar New Year Eve
| 29 January 2012 | Day 23 | I just want Shen Xing Ren (我只要沈杏仁) | 6.71 | 1 | 7.19 | |
| 5 February 2012 | Day 24 | You need luck when you meet your love (遇到相愛的人 需要運氣) | 6.48 | 1 | 7.21 | |
| 12 February 2012 | Day 25; Final | I do (我願意) | 7.33 | 1 | 8.04 | Peak:8.99 |
| Average | | | 5.12 | - | - | - |
