= Another Woman (2015 film) =

2015 film by Chang Wei-chen

- 234說愛你
- Directed by: Chang Wei-Chen
- Starring: Ariel Lin, Eric Qin, Janel Tsai, Peggy Tseng, Chou Heng-Yin and Jolin Chien
- Release date: October 23, 2015
- Running time: 96 minutes
- Country: Taiwan
- Language: Mandarin

Another Woman (Chinese: 234說愛你) is a 2015 Taiwanese romantic film. The film star Ariel Lin, Eric Qin, Janel Tsai, Peggy Tseng, Chou Heng-Yin and Jolin Chien. The film premiered in Taiwan on October 23, 2015.

== Synopsis ==
An aspiring actress, Jian Pei-xun (Ariel Lin) takes on a case given that requires her to assume a false identity. The job was for Pei-xun to trick Wang Dan Li's husband (Janel Tsai), Li Yao (Eric Qin) into taking her as his mistress so that she can get rid of his extramarital affair, but things escalate far more than she had originally planned when Pei-xun falls in love with the married man.

== Cast ==
Main Cast

Cast	Role	Introduction
Ariel Lin	Jian Pei-xun	A fresh graduate and an actress at a small theatrical group. Her dream is to learn acting in Paris, and hence motivating her to accept the job to trick Li Yao into taking her as his mistress.
Eric Qin	Li Yao	Director of Design at Midsummer Night's Dream Jewellery, he marries the Wang Dan Li, daughter of the boss and is the heir to the business. He is a fatal attraction for women, and hooked up with one of the company designer, Yu Chien, and also attracts Pei-xun with his handsome appearance.
Jolin Chien	A-Ze	Pei-xun's boyfriend, an honest man who likes desserts-making. He hope to go to Paris with Pei-xun.
Janel Tsai	Wang Dan Li	The wife of Li Yao, and the daughter of the Midsummer Night Dream's boss. She is very observant and is an expert at socialising.
Chou Heng-Yin	Yu Chien	Designer working at Midsummer Night Dream, she is a very competent woman and also, Li Yao's best working partner. She is also Li Yao's mistress.
Peggy Tseng	Sister Bao	The boss of the private eye agency and the mastermind to the job of getting Pei-xun to trick Li Yao. She is an elegant, mysterious and capable woman.

Supporting Cast

Cast	Role	Introduction
Shih Ming-shuai	Head of the Theatrical Group	The head of the theatrical group that Pei-xun is in, he thinks that Pei-xun is unable to get into her character as she lives an over-stable life.
Ronan Lo	Jewellery Designer	A jewellery designer at Midsummer Night Dream
Hong Jian Cang	Member of the Theatrical Group	A member of the theatrical group who acts as Mickey in A Streetcar Named Desire.
Fan Xiao An	Member of the Theatrical Group	Member of the theatrical group, and also a friend of Pei-xun's.
Hsu Chun Geng	Member of the Theatrical Group	Member of the theatrical group, and also a friend of Pei-xun's.
Zheng Zhen Rong	Extramarital affair man	He is the man who was involved in the extramarital affair case that Pei-xun was following on at the private eye agency.

== Soundtrack ==
Type	Title	Singer	Lyricist	Songwriter
Opening Theme	Forget Love	A-Lin	Zhang Jian Jun-Wei, Ge Da Wei	Zhang Jian Jun-Wei
Ending Theme	Unbroken	Rosie Yang	Wu I-Wei	Perez, Rigo/Bell, Hayden John/Lundback-Bell, Sarah

== Reception ==
The film has earned a total box office of US$240,000.
