= Shih Ming-shuai =

Taiwanese actor (born 1982)

- 施名帥
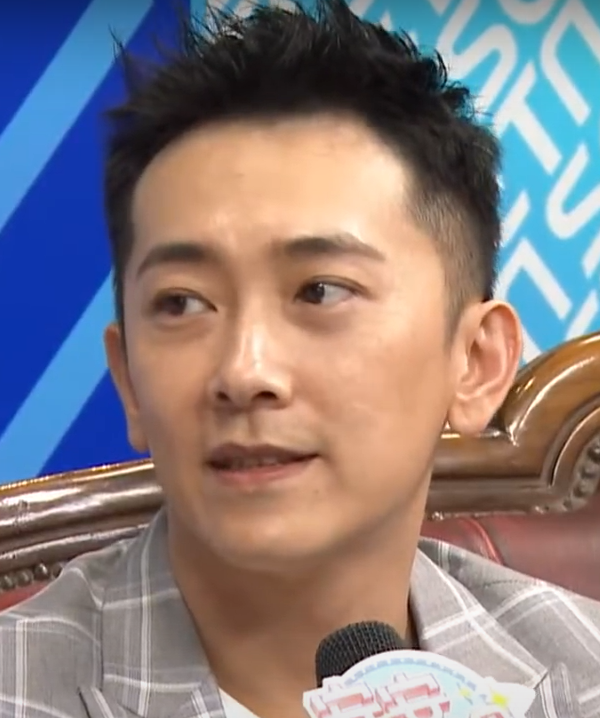
- Shih in July 2020
- Born: Shih Ming-shuai; 23 August 1982 (age 43); Taiwan
- Education: Taipei National University of the Arts (BFA)
- Occupations: Actor; Television host
- Years active: 2011–present
- Spouse: Zhu Zhi-ying (m. 2023)

Shih Ming-shuai (Chinese: 施名帥; born 23 August 1982) is a Taiwanese actor and television host. He appeared in the films The Bold, the Corrupt, and the Beautiful (2017), The Scoundrels (2018), and Nina Wu (2019), before landing leading roles in the film Classmates Minus and the FTV series Animal Whisper (both 2020), for which he received a nomination for Best Male Lead in the 56th Golden Bell Awards. He also co-hosted the variety program Three Piglets from 2021 to 2022 and won Best Host in a Reality Show in the 57th Golden Bell Awards. In 2024, he won Best Supporting Actor in the 61st Golden Horse Awards for his performance in GATAO: Like Father Like Son.

== Early life and education ==
Shih was born on 23 August 1982. He grew up in a single-parent family, primarily raised by his grandparents, while his mother worked as a nurse at Keelung Chang Gung Memorial Hospital. He described his family's financial situation as poor and began working part-time as early as elementary school. Shih attended Hwa Kang Arts School for high school, where he later reflected on his years as lacking motivation, repeating his freshman year three times and even being suspended for a semester due to fighting. After watching Legacy, a dance performance choreographed by Lin Hwai-min, Shih developed an interest in performing and worked hard to gain admission to Taipei National University of the Arts. He initially studied at the School of Dance in his freshman year but transferred to the School of Theater Arts in his second year. He explained that he transferred because of a knee injury sustained from frequent dance practices, and he chose to pursue acting instead to ensure a longer performing career. He was a classmate of fellow actor Huang Di-yang. He spent a total of six years at TNUA before graduating with a Bachelor of Fine Arts. During his university years, Shih began filming advertisements, including one alongside Gwei Lun-mei, and also performed as a stage actor for Shakespeare's Wild Sisters Group and Move Theater.

== Career ==
=== Early roles (2011–2019) ===
In 2011, Shih began his on-screen career after completing his mandatory military service at the age of 29. In his early acting career, he could not afford rent, so he worked as an editing assistant at a friend's production studio, where he also slept. He made his debut in the drama film Coconut, which earned him nominations for Best Actor and Best New Talent in the 13th Taipei Film Festival. Following these nominations, Shih began receiving offers for television roles, including a recurring part as Axe in the 2012 Hakka TV series Jump！ Cheerleader. In 2014, he appeared in a supporting role as the brother of Austin Lin's character in the drama film Anywhere Somewhere Nowhere, followed by leading roles in the Hakka TV series Brave Forward and the television film The Free Man, for which he received a nomination for Best Leading Actor in a Miniseries or Television Film in the 49th Golden Bell Awards. In 2015, Shih starred in the drama film The Laundryman, and took on recurring roles in An Adopted Daughter and A Touch of Green. He also made cameo appearances as a film director in the drama Another Woman, and as a special agent from the 1980s alongside Mo Tzu-yi in the period drama The Best of Youth. Shih continued to appear in supporting roles, portraying a gangster in the 2016 drama Fighting Meiling and an assassin named Duan Yi in the 2017 crime film The Bold, the Corrupt, and the Beautiful. He also appeared in the family drama We are All Family and Wake Up 2 that same year.

In 2018, Shih played Wu Tzu-jie, one half of a good-cop-bad-cop duo alongside Jack Kao in the crime film The Scoundrels, for which Elizabeth Kerr of The Hollywood Reporter praised their performances, stating they "elevated The Scoundrels into respectability". He also had a leading role in the Chinese period drama The Bittersweet Taiwan, alongside seven other Taiwanese actors in the ensemble. In 2019, Shih portrayed The Director, the filmmaker in the film-within-a-film Spy Romance, in the drama Nina Wu directed by Midi Z, with C.J. Sheu of The News Lens describing his performance as creating "an atmosphere of fear on set". He appeared as the right-hand man of a police chief played by Joan Chen the crime film Sheep Without a Shepherd, and as a psychiatrist in the drama series The World Between Us.

=== Lead roles and critical recognition (2020–present) ===
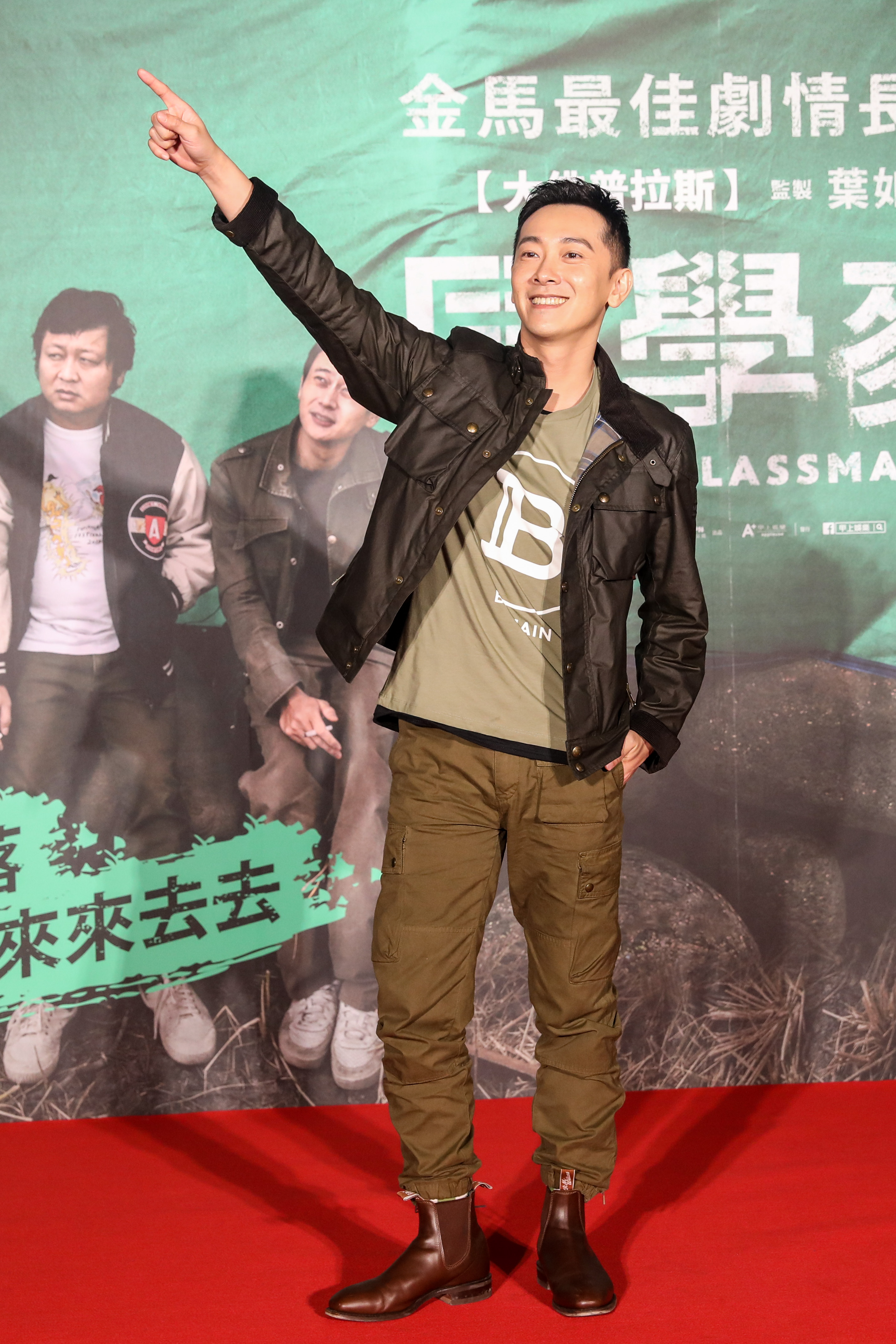
Shih at the premiere of Classmates Minus in November 2020

In 2020, Shih landed his first male lead role as Tom, a struggling film director, in the drama film Classmates Minus, and made a guest appearance in the romance film A Leg, which Estella Huang of Mirror Media described as "enriching" the film. He also starred in another leading role in the pet-themed FTV series Animal Whisper, which earned him a nomination for Best Male Lead in a Television Series in the 56th Golden Bell Awards. In 2021, Shih joined the variety program Three Piglets in the second season, and returned to host the third season alongside Yang Kuei-mei, Austin Lin, and Wen Chen-ling in 2022, for which they won Best Host in a Reality or Game Show in the 57th Golden Bell Awards. Shih also took on main roles in the drama series No Regrets In Life and the anthology series On Marriage that same year.

In 2023, Shih secured leading roles in the drama film Day Off and the crime series Taiwan Crime Stories. He also made a cameo appearance as a frozen corpse in the horror-comedy series What The Hell Is Love, which was well-received among audience. In 2024, Shih starred as a table tennis coach in the sports film Doubles Match. Lee Kuang-chueh, writing for Yahoo! Lifestyle, called Shih's interactions with his character's daughter (played by Yeh Yi-jun) "very interesting" and praised his character arc. He then appeared as a captive during the Pacific War in the period drama Three Tears in Borneo, followed by a lead role as Mang, a high-ranking gangster, in the film GATAO: Like Father Like Son, for which he won Best Supporting Actor in the 61st Golden Horse Awards.

== Personal life ==
Shih married fellow actress Zhu Zhi-ying on 20 May 2023 after a seven-year relationship, and they publicly announced their marriage in August 2024. They were classmates at Taipei National University of the Arts and have known each other for 17 years, but they only began their relationship in 2017.

== Filmography ==
=== Film ===
Year	Title	Role	Notes/Ref.
2011	Coconut	Coconut (椰子)	
2014	Anywhere Somewhere Nowhere	Li Nien (李念)	
2014	Paradise in Service	Bully	
2014	The Rice Bomber	Senior	
2015	The Laundryman	Bo (小寶)	
2015	Another Woman	Head of Theatrical Group	Cameo
2017	The Bold, the Corrupt, and the Beautiful	Duan Yi (段義)	
2018	The Scoundrels	Wu Tzu-jie (吳子杰)	
2018	Cities of Last Things	Ho (小何)	Cameo
2019	Nina Wu	The Director (導演)	
2019	Deep Evil	Chen Dao (陳到)	
2019	A Sun	Garage owner	Cameo
2019	Sheep Without a Shepherd	Sang Kun (桑坤)	
2020	Classmates Minus	Tom (吳銘添)	
2020	A Leg	Mr. Chen (陳先生)	
2023	Day Off	Chou Jie-nan (周佳男)	
2023	Trouble Girl	Hsiao's father	
2024	Doubles Match	The Coach	
2024	GATAO: Like Father Like Son	Mang (阿猛)	
2024	A Place Called Silence	Wu Wang (吳望)	

=== Television ===
Year	Title	Role	Notes/Ref.
2012	Jump！ Cheerleader	Axe (斧頭)	Recurring role
2014	Brave Forward	Lo Ching-hsien (羅清賢)	Main role
2014	The Free Man	Jie (阿傑)	Main role; television film
2015	Haru	Liu Ming-de (劉明德)	Guest role
2015	An Adopted Daughter	Lai Tzu-chong (賴子松)	Recurring role
2015	A Touch of Green	Wang Gang (王剛)	Recurring role
2015	The Best of Youth	1980s special agent	Cameo
2016	Fighting Meiling	Lo Ping-an (羅平安)	Recurring role
2017	We are All Family	Yang Wen-lian (楊文煉)	Main role
2017	Wake Up 2	Qiu Chun (邱淳)	Recurring role
2017	Days We Stared at the Sun II	Ben	Cameo
2018	The Bittersweet Taiwan	Chou Hsiao-tang (周紹堂)	Main role
2019	The World Between Us	Lin Yi-chun (林一駿)	Co-starring
2020	Animal Whisper	Lo Chun (羅鈞)	Main role
2021	The Making of an Ordinary Woman 2	Apartment-touring husband	Cameo
2022	No Regrets In Life	Chang Kai-hsin (張凱新)	Main role
2022	On Marriage	Cho Yu-men (曹昱門)	Main role
2023	What The Hell Is Love	Dr. Tseng Shi-fan (曾士凡)	Cameo
2023	Taiwan Crime Stories	Zhao Yan-jie (趙彥傑)	Main role
2024	Three Tears in Borneo	Lo Chin-fu (羅進福)	Main role
2026	Haunted House Secrets	Chen Yung-jen (陳勇仁)	Main role

== Awards and nominations ==
Year	Award	Category	Work	Result	Ref.
2011	13th Taipei Film Festival	Best Actor	Coconut	Nominated	
2011	13th Taipei Film Festival	Best New Talent	Coconut	Nominated	
2014	49th Golden Bell Awards	Best Leading Actor in a Miniseries or Television Film	The Free Man	Nominated	
2021	56th Golden Bell Awards	Best Male Lead in a Television Series	Animal Whisper	Nominated	
2022	57th Golden Bell Awards	Best Host in a Reality or Game Show	Three Piglets	Won	
2024	61st Golden Horse Awards	Best Supporting Actor	GATAO: Like Father Like Son	Won	
