= Golden Bell Award for Best Host in a Reality or Game Show =

Taiwanese television award

- Awarded for: Best Host in a Reality or Game Show
- Location: Taiwan
- Presented by: Bureau of Audiovisual and Music Industry Development
- First award: 2017
- Currently held by: Sam Tseng for A Wonderful Word (2023)
- Website: gba.tavis.tw

The Golden Bell Award for Best Host in a Reality or Game Show (Chinese: 電視金鐘獎益智及實境節目主持人獎) is one of the categories of the competition for the Taiwanese television production, Golden Bell Awards. It has been awarded since 2017.

== Award winners ==
=== 2020s ===
Year	Winner	English title	Original title	Ref
2020; 55th Golden Bell Awards	Sam Tseng and Gladys Tsai	National Star Raiders	全民星攻略	
2021; 56th Golden Bell Awards	Sam Tseng	A Wonderful Word	一字千金	
2022; 57th Golden Bell Awards	Yang Kuei-mei, Shih Ming-shuai, Wen Chen-ling and Austin Lin	Three Piglets 3	阮三个3	
2023; 58th Golden Bell Awards	Sam Tseng	A Wonderful Word	一字千金 筆武大匯	
