= Jenna Wang =

Taiwanese actress

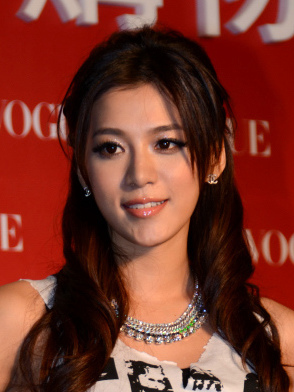
- Born: 25 May 1987 (age 38); Taipei, Taiwan
- Occupation: actress

Jenna Wang or Wang Szu-ping (Chinese: 王思平; pinyin: Wáng Sīpíng) is a Taiwanese actress.

== Filmography ==
=== Television series ===
| Year | English title | Original title | Role | Notes |
|---|---|---|---|---|
| 2011 | Inborn Pair | 真愛找麻煩 | Lo Yun | |
| 2013 | Deja Vu | 回到愛以前 | Xu You Xi | |
| 2013 | Fabulous Boys | 原來是美男 | Liu Xin Ning | |
| 2013 | Happy 300 Days | 遇見幸福300天 | Joanne Xu Xin Ping | |
| 2014 | Boysitter | 俏摩女搶頭婚 | Flight attendant | |
| 2015 | Haru | 春梅 | Zhao Kuan Mei | |
| 2015 | Murphy's Law of Love | 浮士德的微笑 | He Zhi-yu | |
| 2018 | Flipped | 喜欢你时风好甜 | Du Wan-tian | |

=== Films ===
- Gangster Rock (2010)
- War Game 229 (2011)
- Open! Open! (2015)
- Oh, Pretty Woman (2018)
