= Gifted (Singaporean TV series) =

2018 Singaporean TV series

- 天之骄子
- Genre: Drama
- Starring: Elvin Ng; Zhang Yaodong; Tong Bing Yu; Dawn Yeoh; Michelle Chia; Patrick Lee; Fiona Xie
- Opening theme: 烽火 by Desmond Ng 黄振隆
- Ending theme: 幸福不同步 by Jyin Poh 傅健颖
- Country of origin: Singapore
- Original language: Chinese
- No. of episodes: 20

Production
- Production locations: Singapore; Malaysia
- Running time: approx. 45 minutes (excluding advertisements)

Original release
- Network: Astro AEC (Malaysia); Mediacorp Channel 8 (Singapore)
- Release: 9 July – 3 August 2018

Related
- Fifty & Fabulous; Say Cheese

Gifted (Chinese: 天之骄子) is a Singaporean drama produced by Mediacorp Studios Malaysia and telecast on Mediacorp Channel 8. The show is currently airing at 9pm on weekdays and has a repeat telecast at 8am the following day. The series consists of 20 episodes.

== Cast ==
- Elvin Ng as Guan Yaozu 关耀祖
- Zhang Yaodong as Li Xiaoyi 李孝义
- Tong Bing Yu as Su Lingli 苏伶俐
- Dawn Yeoh as He Lulu 何露露
- Michelle Chia as Yao Liqian 姚丽倩
- Patrick Lee as Guan Dezhi 关得志
- Frederick Lee as Liao Weihao 廖伟豪
- Fiona Xie as Ma Xinrou 马心柔
- Teddy Tang as Zhao Qikang 赵启康
- Hong Huifang as Hu Jinmei 胡锦梅
- Chen Xiuhuan as Luo Yali 罗雅丽
- Bernard Tan as Zhao Donghao 赵洞豪
- Zhang Wei 张为 as Grandpa Luo 罗爷爷
- Jeffrey Chong 庄惟翔 as Ma Dongliang 马栋梁
- Hu Wensui

== Original Sound Tracks ==
Song title	Song Type	Singer
烽火	Theme song	Desmond Ng
幸福不同步	Ending theme	Jyin Poh

== See also ==
- List of programmes broadcast by Mediacorp Channel 8
