= Better Man (2016 TV series) =

Taiwanese TV series

- Promo poster
- 我的極品男友
- Genre: Romance, Family
- Created by: Sanlih E-Television
- Written by: Zheng Han Wen 鄭涵文; Wu Xiang Ying 吳香穎; Li Ying Yuan 李盈緣
- Directed by: Hao Xin Xiang 郝心翔; Jiang Bing Chen 姜秉辰 (ep 1-11)
- Starring: Lin Yo-Wei 林佑威; Tender Huang 黃騰浩; Jolin Chien 簡宏霖; Cindy Lien 連俞涵; Shara Lin 林逸欣; Hope Lin 林可彤
- Opening theme: Faded Pictures (屬於你和我之間的事) by Vanness Wu (吳建豪)
- Ending theme: All You Did (都是你害的) by Bii
- Country of origin: Republic of China (Taiwan)
- Original languages: Standard Mandarin; Taiwanese Hokkien
- No. of seasons: 1
- No. of episodes: 60

Production
- Producers: Fang Xiao Ren 方孝仁; Rong Jun Yi 戎俊義
- Production location: Taiwan
- Camera setup: Multi camera
- Running time: 60 minutes
- Production companies: 金牌合作影像製作股份有限公司; Golden Bloom Production Co., Ltd. 金牌風華影像製作股份有限公司; Sanlih E-Television 三立電視股份有限公司

Original release
- Network: SET Metro; EBC Variety
- Release: 1 June – 23 August 2016

Better Man (Chinese: 我的極品男友; pinyin: wǒ de jípǐn nányǒu; lit. 'My Best Quality Boyfriend') is a 2016 Taiwanese romance, family television drama starring Lin Yo-Wei, Tender Huang, Jolin Chien, Cindy Lien, Shara Lin and Hope Lin. Filming began on May 5, 2016 and the episodes were aired as soon as the filming finished. The original broadcast began on June 1, 2016 on SET Metro, airing weekdays (Monday through Friday) at 8:00 pm.

== Synopsis ==
The Yang brothers have it all — good looks, brains and family background. But each shuns romantic entanglements for his own reasons. Yang Zhenwei is the workaholic eldest brother who only has his mind set on expanding his catering business. Yang Zhenhao is the middle brother who works in the entertainment industry and as a fitness instructor. Yang Zhenkai is the meticulous youngest brother who has been given the position of CEO of the family empire. How will the brothers handle their emotions when they each meet a woman who turns their perfect worlds upside down?

== Cast ==
=== Main cast ===
- Lin Yo-Wei (林佑威) as Yang Zhenwei (楊振偉)
- Tender Huang (黃騰浩) as Jerry Yang Zhenhao (楊振浩)
- Jolin Chien (言明澔) as Yang Zhenkai (楊振凱)
- Cindy Lien (連俞涵) as Wu Yixin (吾以心)
- Shara Lin (林逸欣) as Wu Yian (吾以安)
- Hope Lin (林可彤) as May Yao Youzhen (姚又真)

=== Supporting cast ===
- Shen Hairong (沈海蓉) as Yang Chen Shun Yu (楊孟舜玉)
- Lia Lee (李相林) as Guan Meiyu (關美妤)
- Jian Chang (檢場) as Wu Jiaxing (吾家興)
- Doris Kuang (況明潔) as Lin Huilan (林蕙蘭)
- BeBe Chang (杜姸) as Ding Yuchen (丁雨晨)
- Don Wong (王道) as Yang Guozheng (楊國政)
- Candace Hu (胡佩蓮) as Xu Yufang (許毓芳)

=== Cameos ===
- Awayne Liu (劉峻緯) as Liu Dawei (劉大緯)
- Brian Zou (鄒守宏) as Guan Qixiang (關啟祥)
- Chang Kuang-chieh (張光傑) as Chen Qingdong (陳慶東)
- Chung Lun-li (鍾倫理) as factory manager
- Hank Wu (吳仲強) as Zhang Weide (張威德)
- Yvonne Liang (梁以辰) as Ding Yuwei (丁雨薇; photo only)
- Ying Tsai-ling (應采靈) as Rui Yi (瑞姨)
- Nylon Chen (陳乃榮) as He Yanzhi (何彥智)
- Chen Ching-chieh (瑤涵沂) as Jiang Ning (蔣甯)
- ?? as Daniel
- ?? as Katy
- ?? as Ziqi (子奇)
- ?? Xu Xinyan (徐欣妍)

== Soundtrack ==
Better Man Original TV Soundtrack (OST)

Soundtrack album by Various artists
- Released: 16 August 2016
- Genre: Mandopop
- Language: Mandarin
- Label: Universal Music (TW)

Better Man Original TV Soundtrack (OST) (我的極品男友 電視原聲帶) was released on August 16, 2016 by various artists under Universal Music (TW). It contains 13 tracks total, in which 8 tracks are various instrumental versions of the songs. The opening theme is track 1 "Faded Pictures 屬於你和我之間的事" by Vanness Wu. The closing theme "All You Did 都是你害的" by Bii is not featured on the official soundtrack CD since singer Bii is signed exclusively to Linfair Records.

=== Track listing ===
No.	Title	Singer(s)	Length
1.	"Faded Pictures" (屬於你和我之間的事)	Vanness Wu (吳建豪)	4:07
2.	"Restoration" (還原)	Rachel Liang (梁文音)	3:21
3.	"Sweet Rope" (甜美的繩索)	Nana Lee (李千娜)	4:15
4.	"You Already Know My Heart" (其實你已經知道)	Dawen (王大文)	4:20
5.	"Big Confession" (大告白)	Da Mouth 大嘴巴	3:58
6.	"Faded Pictures (Heartwarming Lyrical ver.)" (屬於你我之間的事 暖心抒情版)	Liao Wei-Chieh	3:20
7.	"Unexpected Encounter (Tasted Happiness ver.)" (不期而遇 淺嚐幸福版)	Liao Wei-Chieh	3:19
8.	"Faded Pictures (Understanding Love ver.)" (屬於你和我之間的事 默契愛意版)	Liao Wei-Chieh	2:56
9.	"Faded Pictures (Innocent Playmates ver.)" (屬於你和我之間的事 兩小無猜版)	Liao Wei-Chieh	2:08
10.	"Unexpected Encounter (Lonely ver.)" (不期而遇 獨處孤寂版)	Liao Wei-Chieh	4:03
11.	"Unexpected Encounter (Heartbreaking ver.)" (不期而遇 痛徹心扉版)	Liao Wei-Chieh	3:54
12.	"Unexpected Encounter (Romantic Sweet ver.)" (不期而遇 浪漫甜美版)	Liao Wei-Chieh	2:58
13.	"Unexpected Encounter (Simple and Pure Love ver.)" (甜美的繩索 樸實純愛版)	Liao Wei-Chieh	3:48

Songs not featured on the official soundtrack album.

- All You Did (都是你害的) by Bii
- 38 by Bii
- Maybe Baby by Bii
- That's Where I Wanna Be (想) by Dino Lee
- I Love You, I Do by Ian Chen
- Gonna Be OK by Nana Lee
- Unexpected Encounter (不期而遇) by Rachel Liang

== Broadcast ==
Network	Country	Airing Date	Timeslot
SET Metro	Taiwan	June 1, 2016	Monday to Friday 8:00-9:00 pm
EBC Variety	Taiwan	June 1, 2016	Monday to Friday 9:00-10:00 pm
CTS	Taiwan	April 12, 2017	Monday to Friday 8:00-9:00 pm
Astro Shuang Xing	Malaysia	June 2, 2016	Monday to Friday 6:00-7:00 pm
VV Drama	Singapore	June 29, 2016	Monday to Friday 7:00-8:00 pm

== Episode ratings ==
Competing dramas on rival channels airing at the same time slot were:

- SET Taiwan - Taste of Life
- FTV - Spring Flower
- TTV - Fighting Meiling
- CTV - Golden Darling, The Imperial Doctress, A Good Day
- CTS - The Legend of Mi Yue, Memory, Life As An Ocean
- GTV Variety - KO ONE Re-act (re-run), KO ONE: RE-MEMBER

Air Date	Episodes	Weekly Average Ratings	Rank
Jun 1-3, 2016	1-3	1.02	5
Jun 6-10, 2016	4-8	1.25	4
Jun 13-17, 2016	9-13	1.27	4
Jun 20-24, 2016	14-18	1.48	4
Jun 27-Jul 1, 2016	19-23	1.48	4
Jul 4-8, 2016	24-28	1.47	4
Jul 11-15, 2016	29-33	1.30	4
Jul 18-22, 2016	34-38	1.41	4
Jul 25-29, 2016	39-43	1.54	4
Agt 1-5, 2016	44-48	1.62	4
Agt 8-12, 2016	49-53	1.49	4
Agt 15-19, 2016	54-58	1.74	3
Agt 22-23, 2016	59-60	1.85	3
Average ratings			

== Awards and nominations ==
Year	Ceremony	Category	Nominee	Result
2016	2016 Sanlih Drama Awards	Viewers Choice Drama Award	Better Man	Nominated
2016	2016 Sanlih Drama Awards	Best Actor Award	Lin Yo-Wei	Nominated
2016	2016 Sanlih Drama Awards	Best Actor Award	Tender Huang	Nominated
2016	2016 Sanlih Drama Awards	Best Actress Award	Shara Lin	Nominated
2016	2016 Sanlih Drama Awards	Best Crying Award	Jolin Chien & Hope Lin	Nominated
2016	2016 Sanlih Drama Awards	Best Kiss Award	Jolin Chien & Hope Lin	Nominated
2016	2016 Sanlih Drama Awards	Best Potential Award	Cindy Lien	Nominated
2016	2016 Sanlih Drama Awards	Best Powerful Performance Award	Jian Chang	Nominated
2016	2016 Sanlih Drama Awards	Best Screen Couple Award	Lin Yo-Wei & Cindy Lien	Nominated
2016	2016 Sanlih Drama Awards	Best Screen Couple Award	Tender Huang & Shara Lin	Nominated
2016	2016 Sanlih Drama Awards	Best Screen Couple Award	Jolin Chien & Hope Lin	Nominated
2016	2016 Sanlih Drama Awards	Vidol TV Best Drama Award	Better Man	Won
2016	2016 Sanlih Drama Awards	Viewers Choice Drama's Song Award	Faded Pictures - Vanness Wu	Nominated
2016	2016 Sanlih Drama Awards	Viewers Choice Drama's Song Award	38 - Bii	Nominated
