= Wu Han =

Wu Han may refer to:

- Wu Han (Han dynasty) (吳漢; died 44), Eastern Han dynasty general
- Wu Han (historian), PRC historian and politician whose writing was an impetus for the Cultural Revolution
- Wu Han (pianist), Chinese-American classical pianist
- Wu Han (Indiana Jones), fictional character in the Indiana Jones franchise

== See also ==
- Wuhan, capital of Hubei Province, China
