= Boysitter =

- Promotional poster
- Also known as: Bad Romance 魔女搶頭婚
- 俏摩女搶頭婚
- Genre: Romance; Comedy
- Created by: TVBS
- Written by: Sun Shi-fan 孫詩帆; Lai Yu-xuan 赖瑀瑄; Cai Fang-yun 蔡芳紜; Yu Yuan Yuan 禹元元
- Directed by: Jim Wang 王傳宗
- Starring: Annie Chen; River Huang; Melvin Sia; Nita Lei; Yang Qing; Gao Shan Feng
- Opening theme: Bear Homie 熊麻吉 by 831 八三夭
- Ending theme: A Little Less Talent 少一點天份 by Shi Shi 孫盛希
- Country of origin: Taiwan
- Original language: Mandarin
- No. of seasons: 1
- No. of episodes: 15

Production
- Executive producers: Ke Ci-hui 柯慈輝; Wang Jia-Wen 王家文; Li Fang-yíng 李芳瑩
- Producer: Wang Pei-hua 王珮华
- Production location: Taiwan
- Running time: 90 minutes
- Production companies: TVBS; Gu Jing Production 古鯨製作

Original release
- Network: TVBS; CTV
- Release: 6 December 2014 – 14 March 2015

Boysitter (Chinese: 俏摩女搶頭婚; pinyin: Qiào Mó Nǚ Qiǎng Tóu Hūn) is a 2014 Taiwanese romantic-comedy television series created and produced by TVBS. Starring Annie Chen, River Huang, Melvin Sia as the main leads with Nita Lei, Yang Qing and Gao Shan Feng as the main supporting cast. The original title literally translates to "Pretty Woman Grabs First Marriage". Filming began in August 2014 and wrapped up on November 16, 2014. First original broadcast began on December 6, 2014, on both TVBS and CTV, airing every Saturday night at 9:00-10:00 pm.

== Synopsis ==
Six years ago Yuan Fei (Annie Chen) walks out on her immature longtime boyfriend Hao Jian Ren (River Huang), when he does not show up on their wedding day. Six years later the two meet again. Yuan Fei is now a career-driven single mother and also Jian Ren's senior at work. The two get entangled in a love triangle when playboy Wen Hao Ran (Melvin Sia) comes into the picture. Soon Yuan Fei must choose between her still immature ex-boyfriend Jian Ren or Hao Ran who might just be ready to settle down.

== Plot summary ==
During a plane ride home, Hao Jian Ren who is sitting in coach spots a tall statuesque woman in first class who resembles his ex-girlfriend. He lies to the flight attendant that he thinks the woman in first class is his long-lost sister and agrees to take the flight attendant out to dinner if she lets him go into first class to take a better look at the women. But as he is about to lift up the shades covering the mysterious woman's face, the plane is preparing to land and he is asked to return to his seat. The mysterious woman in first class is indeed his ex-girlfriend Yuan Fei, who walked out on him six years ago when he did not show up for their wedding.

Six years ago Fei pressures Jian Ren into marrying her by withholding sex if he does not agree. Jian Ren who is immature and thinking about himself only agreed to Fei's proposal with sex on the line. However, on their wedding day Jian Ren does not show up. Embarrassed and fed up with Jian Ren's immature behavior, Fei runs out on him without a word. However these six years Fei is still keeping tabs on Jian Ren through mutual friends who tells her about Jian Ren's dating life. The two meet again when she becomes his senior at work, but she is now a career driven women with a child.

== Cast ==
=== Main cast ===
- Annie Chen as Yuan Fei
- River Huang as Hao Jian Ren
- Melvin Sia as Wen Hao Ran
- Nita Lei as Ding Xiao En
- Yang Qing as Fang Mei Lin
- Gao Shan Feng as Zhang Wen Hua

=== Supporting cast ===
- Hsu Hsiao-shun as Qian Shu De
- Kenny Kuo as An Di
- Lia Lee as Barbie
- Jun Dong as Zhang Wen Qing
- Bebe Du as Zhang Wei Ting
- Eason Yu as Yuan Shi Zu
- Hsieh Li-Chin as Kuo Rui Huang

=== Guest role ===
- Hu Yingzhen as plane passenger
- Jenna Wang as flight attendant
- Jacko Chiang as Pub owner
- Grace Wu as Pub girl

== Soundtrack ==
Boysitter Original TV Soundtrack (OST)

Soundtrack album by Various artists
- Released: 5 December 2014
- Genre: Mandopop
- Language: Mandarin
- Label: Rock Records (TW)

Boysitter Original TV Soundtrack (OST) (摩女搶頭婚 電視原聲帶) was released on December 5, 2014, by various artists under Rock Records (TW) record label. It contains 14 tracks total. The opening theme is track 1 "Bear Homie" (熊麻吉) by 831 八三夭, while the closing theme is track 2 "A Little Less Talent" (少一點天份) by Shi Shi 孫盛希.

=== Track listing ===
No.	Title	Singer(s)	Length
1.	"Bear Homie" (熊麻吉)	831 八三夭	3:56
2.	"A Little Less Talent" (少一點天份)	Shi Shi 孫盛希	4:34
3.	"Addiction" (癮)	Genie Chuo 卓文萱	4:04
4.	"Separated, Then Cried" (分開了,於是哭了)	Instrumental	2:51
5.	"Happiness, It Can Fight It?" (幸福，是可以爭取的嗎？)	Instrumental	2:16
6.	"Confessions Of An Ordinary Girl Mood" (普通女孩的告白心情)	Instrumental	2:14
7.	"The Boy And The Man's Fuzzy Boundaries, Romantic" (男孩與男人的模糊界限，浪漫)	Instrumental	3:15
8.	"So To Accompany You, Not Saying A Word" (就這樣陪伴著你，不發一語)	Instrumental	2:46
9.	"I Beg You Do Not Have Talent, I Love This" (求求你愛上這沒有天份的我)	Instrumental	2:21
10.	"Originally, You're My Best Best Friend" (原來，你是我最好的麻吉)	Instrumental	3:29
11.	"Silence Is My Anger Right" (沈默是我的憤怒權利)	Instrumental	2:41
12.	"Modern Woman What Conditions?" (摩女的條件是什麼？)	Instrumental	2:26
13.	"In Love Before, Each Girl Are Equal" (在愛情面前，每個女孩皆平等)	Instrumental	2:34
14.	"Less Talented, More Painful Scars" (少了天份，多了沈痛的傷痕)	Instrumental	2:37

== Broadcast ==
Network	Country	Airing Date	Timeslot
CTV	Taiwan	December 6, 2014 (until January 31, 2015)	Saturday 10:00-11:30 pm
CTV	Taiwan	February 6, 2015	Friday 10:00-11:30 pm
TVBS	Taiwan	December 6, 2014	Saturday 10:00-11:30 pm
E City	Singapore	December 12, 2014	Friday 10:00-11:30 pm

== Episode ratings ==
Competing dramas on rival channels airing at the same time slot were:

- GTV - Apple in Your Eye, Mr. Right Wanted
- SETTV - Say Again Yes I Do

=== CTV ===
Air Date	Episode	Average Ratings	Rank
December 6, 2014	1	0.53	1
December 13, 2014	2	0.48	1
December 20, 2014	3	--	--
December 27, 2014	4	0.57	1
January 3, 2015	5	0.52	1
January 10, 2015	6	0.50	1
January 17, 2015	7	0.69	1
January 24, 2015	8	0.70	1
January 31, 2015	9	--	--
February 7, 2015	10		
February 14, 2015	11		
February 21, 2015	12		
February 28, 2015	13		
March 7, 2015	14		
March 14, 2015	15		
Average ratings			
