= Haru (TV series) =

- Also known as: Chun Mei
- Chinese: 春梅
- Hokkien POJ: Chhun-môe
- Genre: Period drama
- Based on: 望乡 (Wang Xiang)
- Written by: Xie Dingyu; Huang Xingao; Wang Hui Zhu; Jian You Ping
- Directed by: Hong Yu Ru
- Starring: Allison Lin; Junior Han; Yankee Yang; Darren Chiu; Jenna Wang; Patrick Lee
- Theme music composer: Fang Wenshan
- Opening theme: "Louder & Louder" Performed by Andrew Yeh
- Ending theme: "Haru" Performed by Cindy Yen
- Composer: Fang Wenshan
- Country of origin: Taiwan
- Original languages: Taiwanese; Japanese; English; Cantonese (dubbed from TVB)
- No. of episodes: 54

Production
- Producer: Pan Yi Qun
- Running time: 45 minutes
- Production company: Taiwan Television

Original release
- Network: TTV Main Channel
- Release: 7 May – 21 July 2015

Haru (Chinese: 春梅; Pe̍h-ōe-jī: Chhun-môe) is a Taiwanese Hokkien television drama that began airing on TTV Main Channel in Taiwan on 7 May 2015, from Mondays to Fridays, and ends on 21 July 2015, with a total of 54 episodes.

== Cast ==
=== Main cast ===
- Allison Lin as Chun Mei (Haru)
  - Lin Jianxuan as Young Chun Mei (Haru)
- Junior Han as Lin Junyan (Hiko)
- Yankee Yang as Miyamoto Tsuyoshi
- Darren Chiu as Zhuang He Tai
  - Bing Cheng Yu as Young Zhuang He Tai
- Jenna Wang as Zhao Kuan Mei (Hiromi)
- Patrick Lee as Nakamura Kouhei

=== Other casts ===
- Chu De-Kang as Lin Qingtang (Lin Sensei)
  - Ye En as Young Lin Qingtang
- Xi Man-Ning as Lin Chen Wenying (Sakura)
  - Chang Hsiao Lan as Young Chen Wenying
- Lin Nai-hua as Ah Hao Shen
- Akio Chen as Zhuang Da Jin
- Teddy Wang as Dr. Chen Wenqian
- Blaire Chang as Zheng Wenxiu
- Cao Jingjun as Shunji Ono
- Felicia Huang as Qin Jia Mei
- John Chen as Zhao Rong San
- Hu Xiaofang as Li Xiulian
- Julianne Chu as Kamei Yoko
- Zhang Mingjie as Ryuji Miyamoto

=== Guest stars ===
- Segami Tsuyoshi as Mr. Chitutaro Muraoka
- Ann Lee as Ah Yue
- Chen Qin as Ah Man Yi
- Wu Pong-fong as Li Tiansheng
- Wu Guozhou as Ah Fei
- Jun Harada as Mr. Kamei
- Mokudai Yusuke as Minister of State Police
- Takashi Okamoto as Deputy Director
- Kan'nan Yūji as High-profile Inspection
- Kotaro Okitsu as Yasuhito, Prince Chichibu
- Cai Yijun as Ah Cai
- Eriku Yoza as Japanese Army Deserter
- Huang Wen-hsing as Huang Zhengyi
- Johnny Yin as Chiang Wei-shui
- Mario Pu as Zhang Wenhua
- Rika Arai as Sato Ayumi
- He Yishan as Wang Li-zhen
- Li Yining as Cai Guifen
- Guo Ying as Chen Yuzhi
- Ming Yang as Ah Hui
- Zhou Zijun as Zheng Wenxiu's Mother
- Tong Yijun as Huang Sang
- Xu Haoxiang as Ah Xiong
- Shih Ming-shuai as Liu Mingde
- Zai Xing Chang as Onitsuka
- Chen Enzhen as Ah Jian
- Xiao Min Qian as Zhou Hanmin
- Pan Huangzuo as Ah Yi
- He Shengfei as Ah Xi
- Huang Luyao as Momoco
- Mami Fujioka as Kawashima
- Liu Xiangjun as Jiang Qiuhua
- Zhu Guohong as Lin Tangshan
