= Jolin Chien =

Taiwanese actor, singer, and model

- 言明澔
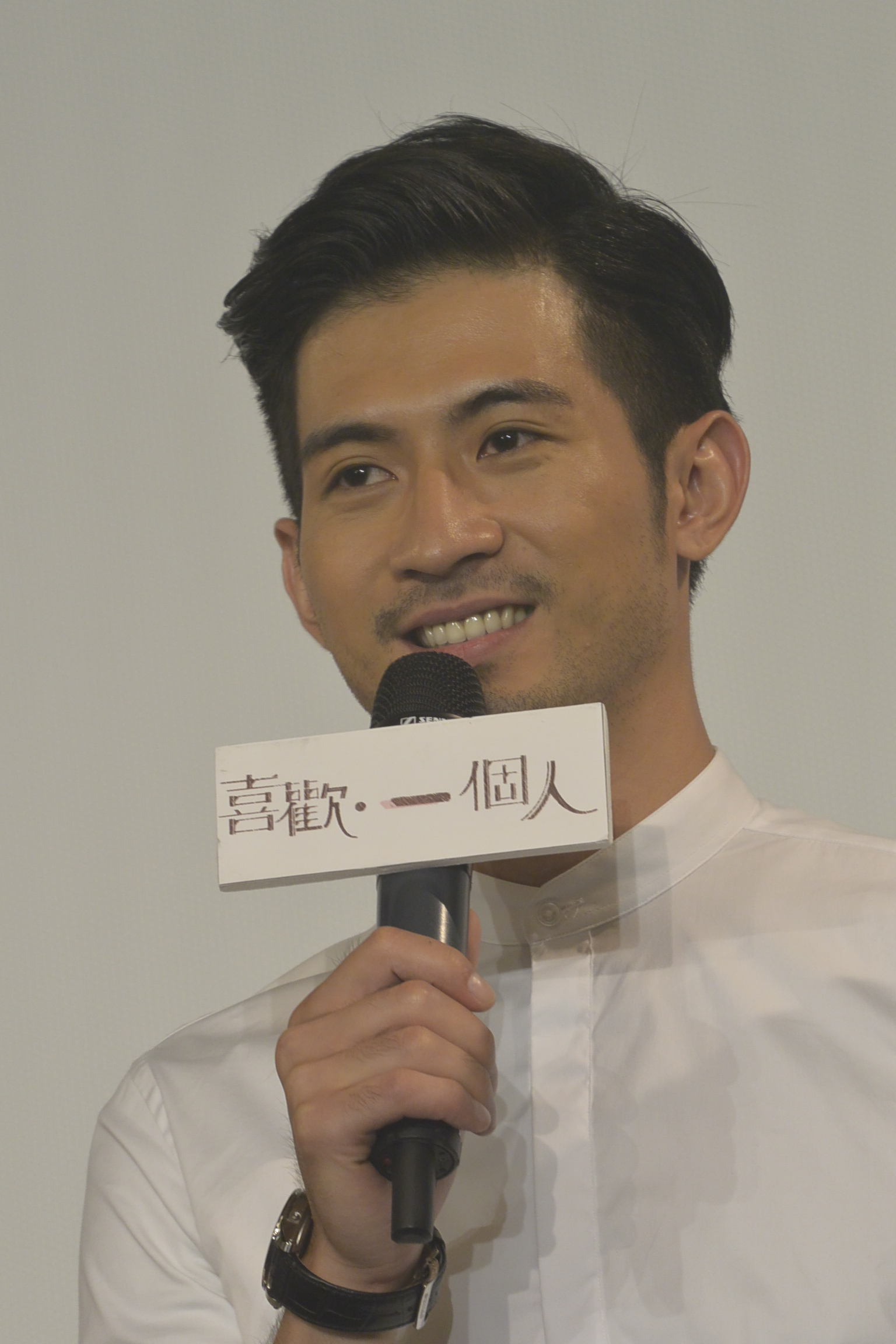
- Chien at a fan meeting on October 11, 2014
- Born: April 4, 1986 (age 39); Taoyuan, Taiwan
- Occupation(s): Singer, actor, model
- Years active: 2005–present
- Height: 180 cm (5 ft 11 in)
- Musical career
- Also known as: Samuel Chien
- Genres: Mandopop
- Instrument: Vocals
- Labels: Universal, Avex

Chinese name
- Chinese: 言明澔
- Hanyu Pinyin: Yán Mínghào

Jolin Chien (Chinese: 言明澔; pinyin: Yán Mínghào; born April 4, 1986) is a Taiwanese singer, actor and model. Formerly went by Samuel Chien, He was discovered while competing in a singing competition. He is a former member of the boy duo band StyLe and current co-leader of boy band 4ever. He and his group members were signed under Avex for music management and currently under Y.H Ent for acting and commercial management.

== Biography ==
Chien was born on April 4, 1986, in Taoyuan, Taiwan. He is the youngest of a two-child family with a brother older than him by two years. Not much is mentioned about his father, all is known is that he grew up in a single parent household mainly raised by his mother. Chien said during his teenage years he was very rebellious and radical.

== Career ==
=== Pre-debut ===
During his late teens, Chien entered a lot of local singing competition and was eventually discovered at a contest. In 2005 he signed with Universal Taiwan to form the musical dual StyLe with Lawrence Chen (陳浩偉). He went by the name Samuel during his time with StyLe. The group performed live throughout school campuses in Taiwan before releasing their self titled debut album in 2007. After finding little success with the group Chien decided to serve his mandatory military conscription and the group officially broke up in 2008 after he competed his military term.

After that Chien went on to work odd jobs such as bartending and cafe barista while trying to break back into the entertainment industry. While working at a cafe called Homey’s in Taipei he met Yorke Sun who went on to become one of 4ever's members.

=== Music ===
In 2011, Chien signed with Avex Taiwan to form four member boy band 4ever. The group debuted in 2012 and slowly found recognition when member David Hsu debuted in acting by starring in a supporting role in the critically acclaimed and award winning Taiwanese idol drama In Time with You. They released their first EP that same year, but however Avex Taiwan terminated their Taiwanese music division in 2013 and the group was left without a record label. Currently the group is not signed to any record label, but is still active as 4ever and continues to perform together.

=== Acting ===
Chien made his acting debut in TTV 2013 romance drama The Pursuit of Happiness in a minor supporting role as the eccentric office homosexual Simon. His acting was well received and the following year he landed the role of second male lead in 2014 SETTV romance comedy Pleasantly Surprised playing all around nice guy Cheng Hao Wei who is loyally devoted to his love interest since college. The drama also stars his bandmates Yorke Sun and Deyn Li in supporting roles. With the success of Pleasantly Surprised, Chien gained further recognition and SETTV once again offered him the second male lead role in 2015 romance comedy Murphy's Law of Love playing ideal perfect guy Xiang Zi Yan.

== Personal life ==
Chien has a huge tribal tattoo on his right shoulder that can be seen when he wears a tank top. His hobbies include drawing, cooking, and singing.

== Television series ==
Year	Chinese Title	English Title	Role	Character
2013	愛的生存之道	The Pursuit of Happiness	Supporting role	Simon
2014	喜歡·一個人	Pleasantly Surprised	2nd male lead	Cheng Hao Wei 程浩威
2015	莫非，這就是愛情	Murphy's Law of Love	2nd male lead	Xiang Zi Yan 向子諺
2015	戀愛鄰距離	Love or Spend	2nd male lead	Mo Cheng Han 莫丞翰
2016	我的極品男友	Better Man	Male co-lead	Yang Zhen Kai 楊振凱
2017	只為你停留	Just for You		Qiao Xi Ming
2017	噗通噗通我愛你	Memory Love		Duan Ruo Fan
2019	網紅的瘋狂世界	Let's Go Crazy on LIVE!		Ren Hao
2019	美味滿閣	Sweet Family		Luo Jun-xiang

== Discography ==
- with StyLe

#	Chinese title	English title	Release date	Label
1st	StyLe首張同名專輯	StyLe	4 April 2007	Universal

- with 4ever

#	Chinese title	English title	Release date	Label
1st	4ever首張同名EP	4ever 1st EP	10 June 2012	Avex

== Music video appearances ==
Year	Song title	Details
2007	"Happy Starting Point" (幸福的起點)	Singer(s): StyLe; Album: StyLe
2007	"Dilemma" (兩難)	Singer(s): StyLe; Album: StyLe
2007	"Love, Forever?" (愛，永遠?)	Singer(s): StyLe; Album: StyLe
2012	"4ever"	Singer(s): 4ever; Album: 4ever debut EP (4ever 首張同名 EP)
2012	"Find Your Map" (找你的地圖)	Singer(s): 4ever; Album: 4ever debut EP (4ever 首張同名 EP)
2012	"Let's Go"	Singer(s): 4ever; Album: 4ever debut EP (4ever 首張同名 EP)
2012	"One More Time" (再一次)	Singer(s): Xiao Yu 小宇; Album: One More Time (再一次)
2012	"The Transition Period" (過渡期)	Singer(s): Xiao Yu 小宇; Album: One More Time (再一次)
2019	"Hubby" (腦公)	Singer(s): Jolin Tsai 蔡依林; Album: Ugly Beauty
