= To the Dearest Intruder =

- Promotional poster
- 致，第三者
- Genre: Romance, Drama
- Created by: Eastern Television
- Written by: Yaya Chang 張綺恩; Li Jie Yu 李婕瑀
- Directed by: Jim Wang 王傳宗
- Starring: Amber An; Melvin Sia; Aggie Hsieh; Marcus Chang
- Opening theme: If We Meet Again 如果我們再相遇 by Wang Li Ren 王笠人
- Ending theme: Don't Say You Never Loved 別說沒愛過 by William Wei
- Country of origin: Taiwan
- Original language: Mandarin
- No. of episodes: 15

Production
- Producer: Wang Pei Hua 王珮華
- Production location: Taiwan
- Running time: 70 minutes
- Production company: Good Whale Studio 王珮華工作室

Original release
- Network: TTV; EBC Variety
- Release: 22 August – 5 December 2015

Related
- Thirty Something

To the Dearest Intruder (Chinese: 致，第三者; pinyin: zhi, di san zhe) is a 2015 Taiwanese television series created and produced by Eastern Television. It stars Amber An, Melvin Sia, Aggie Hsieh and Marcus Chang. Filming began on April 18, 2015, and wrapped up on August 14, 2015. First original broadcast began on August 22, 2015, on TTV airing every Saturday night at 10:00-11:30 pm.

== Synopsis ==
Sometimes best friends like all the same things. But what happens when one of those things is the same man? Song Jia An and Luo Shao Qing are best friends in college. They both are in love with Yan Hao, but Shao Qing learns that Jia An has been saying from childhood that she plans to marry Yan Hao. However, Yan Hao develops feelings for Shao Qing and may have chosen her over Jia An. But his life is suddenly thrust in a different direction when his father is shot to death over money issues, leaving Yan Hao to pay off his father's debt while also trying to establish his own company. Jia An stays by his side during this trying time, so Shao Qing feels she needs to be out of the picture. Ten years later, Yan Hao and Jia An are married and meet up with Shao Qing again at a school reunion. When Yan Hao sees Shao Qing again, he realizes that he is with the wrong woman. Can he make things right after 10 years or will the cruel hands of fate get in the way again?

== Cast ==
=== Main cast ===
- Amber An as Song Jia An (Ria) - The naive and real wife of Yan Hao (Ivan).
- Melvin Sia as Yan Hao (Ivan)
- Aggie Hsieh as Lo Shao Qing (Sharlene) - The main antagonist of the series. she is the mistress of Yan Hao, Lo Shao is mentally unstable and psychopath.
- Marcus Chang (Marco) as Zhang Zhen Lun

=== Supporting cast ===
- Frankie Huang as Sun Zhong Xian
- An Jun Peng as Yan Ran
- Da Wen (Guo Wen Yi) as Du Mei Mei
- Bai Bai as Dou Ying Jun
- Shen Pei Yi as Maggie
- Xie Shan Shan as Zhuan Zhuan

=== Cameo ===
- Chen Bor-jeng as homeless elderly man
- Ma Nien-hsien as interviewer
- Joseph Ma as Li Zhi Wei
- Francesca Kao as Lo's mother
- Su Yi Jing as Mrs. Ye
- Jeff Chang as Brother Chen

== Soundtrack ==
- If We Meet Again 如果我們再相遇 by Wang Li Ren

王笠人

- Don't Say You Never Loved 別說沒愛過 by William Wei 韋禮安
- We Are Still In Love 我們依然愛著 by Fran
- Us 我們 by Jing Wen Tseng 曾静玟 feat. Fang Wu 吳汶芳
- Every Third Person 每個第三者 by Hope Yang 楊蒨時
- Ten Years 十年(國) by Eason Chan 陳奕迅
- Good to Have You 有你真好 by Christine Fan 范瑋琪 feat. Rainie Yang 楊丞琳

== Episode ratings ==
Competing dramas on rival channels airing at the same time slot were:

- SET Metro - When I See You Again, Bromance
- TVBS Entertainment Channel - Youth Power, Wake Up, Taste of Love
- EBC Variety - Love Cuisine, Marry Me, or Not?
- Much TV - Ba Ji Teenagers

Air Date	Episode	Average Ratings	Rank
Aug 22, 2015	1	0.44	3
Aug 29, 2015	2	0.56	1
Sep 5, 2015	3	--	--
Sep 12, 2015	4	--	--
Sep 19, 2015	5	0.64	1
Sep 26, 2015	6	--	--
Oct 3, 2015	7	--	--
Oct 10, 2015	8	0.65	1
Oct 17, 2015	9	0.88	1
Oct 24, 2015	10	1.04	1
Oct 31, 2015	11	0.94	1
Nov 7, 2015	12	1.25	1
Nov 14, 2015	13	1.07	1
November 21, 2015: Airing of "52nd Golden Horse Awards"
Nov 28, 2015	14	1.06	1
Dec 5, 2015	15	1.48	1
Average ratings		0.91	
