= Shia Wa Se (TV series) =

- Promotional poster
- Also known as: Happiness Fujiya
- 幸福不二家
- Genre: Comedy, Romance
- Written by: Lin Qi Le 林其樂; Lin Zhen Hao 林真豪; Xu Zhao Ling 許肇玲; Lin Xuan 林萱; Cai Meng Fen 蔡孟芬; Chen Xi Sheng 陳希聖
- Directed by: Chen Xi Sheng 陳希聖
- Starring: Bobby Dou 竇智孔; Mariko Okubo; Phoebe Huang 黃嘉千; Lo Pei-An 羅北安
- Opening theme: No Longer Alone 不再怕寂寞 by Pets Tseng 曾沛慈
- Ending theme: Single 一個人 by William Wei 韋禮安
- Country of origin: Republic of China (Taiwan)
- Original languages: Mandarin; Hokkien; Japanese
- No. of seasons: 1
- No. of episodes: 14

Production
- Producers: Wang Yao Ci 王瑤慈; Wang Jia Wen 王家文
- Production location: Taiwan
- Running time: 90 minutes

Original release
- Network: TTV; TVBS Entertainment Channel
- Release: 29 January – 29 April 2016

Related
- Taste of Love; Life List

Shia Wa Se (Chinese: 幸福不二家; pinyin: xìng fú bù'èr jiā; literally "A Happiness Is Second to None") is a 2016 Taiwanese comedy, romance television series. It is adaptation from one of nominated drama script on the 4th Television Scriptwriting Awards held by Ministry of Culture. Starring Bobby Dou, Mariko Okubo, Phoebe Huang and Lo Pei-An as the main cast. Filming began on December 10, 2014 and wrapped up on March 23, 2015. First original broadcast began on January 29, 2016 on TTV airing every Friday night at 10:00–11:30 pm.

This drama was originally plan for total of 18 episodes but cut 4 episodes to total of 14 episodes after that.

== Synopsis ==
Matsuzaka Bistro is a hot diner in Taiwan where people go for great homemade food and the welcoming atmosphere of a loving family that owns it. But it could all be a hoax! The sweet parents and their enthusiastic son and daughter are not even related to each other. The strangers met by coincidence when they each needed a new start in life and decided to become a family in order to open the restaurant. But is a true family born or made?

== Cast ==
=== Main cast ===
- Bobby Dou 竇智孔 as Ji Run Hua 紀潤華
- Mariko Okubo as Matsuzaka Nanami / Song Ban Qi Hai (in Chinese) 松坂七海
- Phoebe Huang 黃嘉千 as Cai Yun Qiu 蔡雲雀
- Lo Pei-an 羅北安 as Jiang Yi Lang 江一郎

=== Supporting cast ===
- Esther Wu 吳心緹 as Yui Yang
- Su Chu 素珠 as Yun Qiu's Grandma
- Tsai Chen-nan as Li Huo Tai 李火泰
- Lin Mei-chao 林美照 as Kang De's mother
- Figaro Tseng 曾少宗 as Li Kang De 李康德
- Wu Ting-chien 吳定謙 as Ah Qiang 阿强
- Ada Pan 潘慧如 as Xiao Hui 小卉
- Ko I-chen 柯一正 as Qi Hai's father
- Takiko Nakamura 中村多喜子 as Hui Zi 惠子（Keiko）
- Chang Chien 張倩 as Fu Li Ping 傅麗萍（PoPo）

=== Cameos ===
- Wu Nien-jen as himself
- Anna Aoi A'N'D-安娜 as waitress
- Paul Hsu 許騰方 as Xiao Liu 小劉
- Jian Ha Zhong 簡漢宗 as Yi Lang's ex-boss
- Ralf Chiu 邱彥翔 as Peng Yan Da (Old Peng) 彭彥達（老彭）
- Zack An 安伯政 as Li family's younger brother
- ?? as Yui's father
- ?? as Yui's stepmother
- Zheng Wei Hong 鄭偉宏

== Soundtrack ==
- No Longer Alone 不再怕寂寞 by Pets Tseng 曾沛慈
- Single 一個人 by William Wei 韋禮安
- Love, Waiting 留給你的愛 by Fang Wu 吳汶芳
- You Were Meant for Me 最美的等候 by Claire Kuo 郭靜
- Playing Games 玩遊戲 by William Wei 韋禮安
- Mask 面具 by William Wei 韋禮安

== Broadcast ==
Network	Country	Airing Date	Timeslot
TTV	Taiwan	January 29, 2016	Friday 10:00–11:30 pm
TVBS; Entertainment Channel	Taiwan	January 30, 2016	Saturday 10:00–11:30 pm
Now Entertainment	Hong Kong	October 14, 2016	Monday to Friday 8:30–10:00 pm

== Episode ratings ==
Competing dramas on rival channels airing at the same time slot were:

- FTV – Justice Heroes, My Teacher Is Xiao-he
- SET Metro – Back to 1989
- SET Taiwan – La Grande Chaumiere Violette

Air Date	Episode	Average Ratings	Rank
Jan 29, 2016	1	0.61	3
Feb 5, 2016	2	0.84	2
Feb 12, 2016	3	–	3
Feb 19, 2016	4	0.60	3
Feb 26, 2016	5	0.65	3
Mar 4, 2016	6	0.63	4
Mar 11, 2016	7	0.75	4
Mar 18, 2016	8	0.76	4
Mar 25, 2016	9	0.57	4
Apr 1, 2016	10	0.55	4
Apr 8, 2016	11	0.48	4
Apr 15, 2016	12	0.49	4
Apr 22, 2016	13	–	4
Apr 29, 2016	14	0.55	4
Average ratings		0.62	–
