= Yin Qi =

Yin Qi may refer to:

- Yin Qi (actress) (born 1977), better known as Monica Yin, Taiwanese actress
- Yin Qi (speed skater) (born 1992), Chinese speed skater
