= Dead Talents Society =

2024 Taiwanese film by John Hsu

- Theatrical release poster
- Directed by: John Hsu
- Written by: John Hsu; Vincent Tsai
- Produced by: Ivy Chen; Lieh Lee; Aileen Li
- Starring: Chen Bolin; Sandrine Pinna; Gingle Wang; Eleven Yao; Bai Bai; Soso Tseng
- Cinematography: Patrick Chou
- Edited by: Shieh Meng-ju; Chiang Yi-ning
- Music by: Luming Lu; Lin Hsiao-chin; Lin Sih-yu
- Production companies: Activator Co. Sony Pictures International Productions
- Distributed by: Sony Pictures Releasing International
- Release dates: 28 June 2024 (TFF); 7 August 2024 (Taiwan)
- Running time: 110 minutes
- Country: Taiwan
- Language: Mandarin
- Budget: NTD$80 million

Dead Talents Society (Chinese: 鬼才之道) is a 2024 Taiwanese horror comedy film directed and co-written by John Hsu, starring Chen Bolin, Sandrine Pinna, Gingle Wang, Eleven Yao, Bai Bai, and Soso Tseng. Set in a fictional underworld where ghosts can linger in the mortal realm by competing to haunt humans, the film follows a rookie ghost (Wang) as she embarks on a journey to find her own uniqueness under the tutelage of a passionate agent (Chen) and a washed-up diva (Pinna).

The film had its world premiere at the 26th Taipei Film Festival on 28 June 2024, and released theatrically on 7 August in Taiwan.

== Plot ==
Catherine, a renowned underworld diva known for haunting a hotel, is betrayed by her protégé, Jessica, who surpasses her at the Golden Ghost Awards with a series of jump scare videos on the internet, leading to a decline in Catherine's popularity.

Four years later, an unnamed rookie ghost (Note: Gingle Wang's character is unnamed in the film and is referred to as "You there" in the English subtitles, while the character is given the name Cho Hsiao-lei (卓曉雷) offscreen.) discovers that her body is disintegrating, as her childhood 'certificate of hard work', the token which bears the value of her existence the most, has been accidentally discarded by her sister while moving away from the house. Realizing that the loss of the token would result in her perishing within 30 days, Rookie enlists the help of her ghost friend Camilla and joins the entry contest of the Dead Talents Society, where ghosts can receive a working pass to stay in the living world if signed by a haunting agency. Although Rookie's performance is awful, it moves Makoto, the agent of washed-up Catherine, who then invites Rookie to become her new protégé. Before Rookie and Camilla can get acquainted with Catherine and the agency's technician, Kouji, a new guest arrives at the hotel. Rookie and Camilla fail to scare the guest, much to Catherine's dissatisfaction, prompting her to intervene and haunt the guest herself. Enraged, Catherine demands that Makoto dismiss the two newcomers. However, Makoto informs her about the lack of use of their old tricks and the decline in their KPI, and convinces her that Rookie's apparent uselessness could prevent Catherine from being betrayed again. After 20 days of training, Rookie shows little improvement, but during the stay of a young couple, she inadvertently leaps off the building, gets stabbed through the hotel's signboard, and triggers a short circuit, which the couple captures on video and goes viral on the internet.

In the world of the living, a ghost-hunting social media influencer, Non-Believer, announces plans to produce a vlog by watching Jessica's jump scare videos in Rookie's haunted hotel, to see what would happen when the two urban legends are triggered simultaneously. This draws great attention from the underworld; even the Chairghost of the Society expresses interest in how both divas might react. Jessica, now an international star after haunting an American influencer to death, agrees to return to Taiwan and do a crossover haunting show with Rookie, attempting to destroy Catherine's protégé. She publicly humiliates Rookie on a talk show, and when Catherine blames Rookie for not defending herself, the fragile-ego Rookie quits the agency in rage. Makoto finds Rookie at her old house, where she reveals that the piano 'certificate of hard work' was actually forged by her father to encourage her in childhood. Following this, she sets up numerous goals to achieve throughout her life. She accomplishes none of them. Once she withdrew from university and effectively surrendered her second to last goal, the only thing left on her list was to be a good daughter. She ultimately fails it as she is crushed to death by her family's trophy case while trying to secure the certificate in an earthquake. Knowing her story, Makoto encourages Rookie to be herself instead of living up to what others expect.

Meanwhile, the crossover show between Catherine and Jessica commences, with the two sabotaging each other's performances, failing to scare the ghost-hunting influencers. Enraged, Jessica assaults Catherine, causing collateral damage that destroys the influencers' camera, which means the show would not be seen by anyone in the real world, and the Chairghost leaves prematurely before the show's end in dissatisfaction. Touched by Catherine's actions, Rookie shows up at the last second and performs another leap, which manages to scare the influencers, and she chases them away alongside Catherine, Makoto, Camilla, and Kouji.

Although Rookie and Catherine's group loses at the Golden Ghost Awards, their scare of the influencers results in a car crash and the subsequent large exorcising ceremony receives public attention, which satisfies the Chairghost whom ultimately grants renewals of Catherine, Rookie, and Jessica's working passes. In the end, Rookie visits her sister's newborn child and tells him that it is not necessary to be talented, but to simply be himself.

== Cast ==
- Chen Bolin as Makoto, a one-time pop idol-turned-underworld haunting agent of Catherine
- Sandrine Pinna as Catherine, a washed-up underworld diva
- Gingle Wang as The Rookie / Cho Hsiao-lei, a newly deceased young woman who tries to become an underworld diva
- Eleven Yao as Jessica, a renowned underworld diva and the protégé-turned-rival of Catherine
- Bai Bai as Camilla, Rookie's best friend who later becomes a member of Makoto's haunting agency
- Soso Tseng as Kouji, the technical support of Makoto's haunting agency

Also appearing in the film are Da-her Lin as Non-Believer, a ghost-hunting social media influencer; Lung Lung and Daniel Chen as Lola and Ken, Non-Believer's companions; Huang Di-yang as the Chairghost of the Dead Talents Society; and Na Wei-hsun as Rookie's father. Cameo appearances include political commentator Milla as Connie, an underworld talk show host, and comedian Hello Hor as an underworld news anchor.

== Production ==
=== Development ===
Following the commercial success of the 2019 horror film Detention, director John Hsu decided to take a lighter and comedic approach for his new project. Noticing the growing popularity of ghost-themed films in Taiwan, he collaborated with screenwriter Vincent Tsai to develop a never-before-filmed idea in 2020 which later evolved into Dead Talents Society. In February 2021, the duo invested over NT$1 million to shoot a 6.5-minute teaser, which generated significant buzz and online discussions. Chen Bolin and Sandrine Pinna appeared in the teaser and confirmed their involvement in the lead roles, while Milla of the political satirical news channel Eye Central Television was set to make a cameo appearance. Originally scheduled to begin filming in late 2021, the duo spent two years refining the screenplay, going through more than twenty versions, which Hsu attributed to the unexpected popularity of the teaser. On 19 January 2022, Sony Pictures International Productions (SPIP) and Taiwanese production company Activator announced their collaboration to co-produce the film. This marked SPIP's first Taiwanese production in twenty years since the 2002 film Double Vision, with SPIP funding over half of the film's budget. SPIP also acquired worldwide distribution and adaptation rights. In December 2022, Gingle Wang, Bai Bai and Soso Tseng were announced to take up lead roles.

=== Filming ===
Principal photography was initially scheduled to begin in 2021, but was delayed until December 2022 due to rewrites and the COVID-19 pandemic. Several members of the filming crew who had previously collaborated with John Hsu on Detention joined the project, including Patrick Chou as cinematographer, Lore Shih as costume designer, and Wang Chih-cheng as art director. About 50% of the film was shot in Taoyuan, where Hsu explained that the decision was made because the crew sought locations featuring both sea and mountains. Filming was supported by the Taoyuan City Government, with scenes of Rookie's audition, the Golden Ghost Awards Ceremony, the Mid-Autumn Festival party, and Catherine and Makoto's first encounter in the rain all filmed in the municipality. The underworld hotel in the film was primarily shot at Champagne Hotel in Jiaoxi, Yilan. The production crew spent a month renovating the ninth floor and constructing a fake elevator set to recreate the 1970s-80s vibes. Location shooting also took place at Baiyun Park in Xizhi District, New Taipei City, and in Zhongshan District, Keelung. Filming concluded in January 2023.

=== Post-production ===
Due to an extensive number of VFX shots, the film underwent an additional year of post-production after filming. An official trailer was released on 1 April 2024, with Eleven Yao, Huang Di-yang, Lung Lung, Da-her Lin, and Daniel Chan revealed to be part of the cast. The film was presented at the Golden Horse Goes to Cannes section of the 2024 Cannes Film Festival, a new program collaborated by the Golden Horse Awards and Marché du Film with the support of Taiwan's Ministry of Culture, on 16 May 2024.

== Music ==
The soundtrack of Dead Talents Society was scored by Luming Lu, Lin Hsiao-chin, and Lin Sih-yu, with Lu returning from his previous collaboration with Hsu on Detention. Lu also composed the song "The Adoring Look", performed by Chen Bolin, which was used as a running gag in the film and went viral on the internet. The film's theme song, "Dead Talents Society", was composed and performed by Taiwanese-American singer-songwriter Joanna Wang, who wrote lyrics in both Chinese and English and produced bilingual versions.

== Release ==
The film had its world premiere at the 26th Taipei Film Festival on 28 June 2024, and was theatrically released on 7 August in Taiwan. The film was also presented in the Midnight Madness section at the 49th Toronto International Film Festival, marking its North American debut, followed by screenings at the 19th Fantastic Fest, 17th Strasbourg European Fantastic Film Festival, 44th Hawaii International Film Festival, 2024 Warsaw Film Festival, and 57th Sitges Film Festival. The film then had its UK premiere at the 9th London East Asia Film Festival on 25 October, and is set to be screened in the Limelight section of the 54th International Film Festival Rotterdam in 2025.

== Reception ==
=== Box office ===
Dead Talents Society opened at the top of the Taipei box office, bringing in 3.5 million NTD on its first day, and accumulated over 15 million NTD in revenue during its opening weekend. The film raked in 30 million NTD at the box office in its second week, and reached 40 million NTD in the third week. It grossed over 57 million NTD by late September, and climbed to 60 million NTD by mid October.

=== Critical response ===
James Marsh of South China Morning Post gave Dead Talents Society 4/5 stars and described the film as "wildly imaginative, frequently hilarious and shamelessly feel-good", with insightful explorations on existential purposes. Tay Yek Keak of Today also gave the film 4/5 stars, calling it as "one hell of a fun ride" and lauding its enjoyable blend of humor and heart, along with its clever portrayal of relatable ghosts and a touching story about friendship and self-worth in the afterlife. Joe Lipsett of Bloody Disgusting rated the film 4.5/5 stars, describing it as "an instant horror comedy classic and one of the best genre films of the year," and praised its fun vibes, effective blend of humor, cleverly written plot, and lovable characters.

In her IndieWire review, Katie Rife acknowledged the film's awards and domestic critical acclaim, giving it a B+ while praising its unique worldbuilding, emotionally realistic characters, and "zany slapstick" humour, and she credited John Hsu for his "strong vision and a steady hand" in balancing the film's disparate elements and themes, concluding that "horror-comedies this charming don't come around often". Zachary Lee of RogerEbert.com also praised John Hsu as a skilled director who combines a reverence for the horror genre with a unique theme and narrative that reflects the anxieties of the younger generation, while also commending Gingle Wang's performance as the Rookie for its relatability and depth that enrich the film's existential themes. Whang Yee Ling of The Straits Times awarded the film 4/5 stars, praising its delightful and imaginative approach to exploring existential fears through Gingle Wang's character and labelling it as an "ebullient screwball horror".

Yasmin Zulraez of The Sun focused on the technical aspects and gave the film 8/10 marks, finding its visually striking production design that vividly brings the underworld to life through rich colors and special effects, as well as the score's skillful blend of traditional Chinese instruments with modern sounds, which strengthen both the film's emotional depth and playful atmosphere. Anna Miller of Collider also gave the film 8/10 marks and commended the cast and crew for delivering sharp humor, witty dialogue, and examining themes of self-discovery, calling the performances "incredible" and the ensemble were "committed to such physically demanding and dialogue-heavy roles", while also acknowledging the cinematography and music that impressively complemented the film. Writing for The News Lens, Berton Hsu also commended the film's entertaining qualities, visual designs, and experimental narrative approach, while remarking the director's bold attempt in balancing horror and comedic elements to create a unique afterlife world.

Charles Pulliam-Moore of The Verge complimented the unique and engaging worldbuilding, despite its elements reminiscent of All About Eve (1950) and Monsters, Inc. (2001), which effectively portrayed a whimsical afterlife through the journey of the protagonist, The Rookie, presenting a fresh and entertaining take on ghostly existence. Estella Huang of Mirror Media referred the film as a complete and well-crafted supernatural comedy, also noting that while the film's setting may bear resemblance to Pixar films Monsters, Inc. and Coco (2017), the insightful commentary that reflects real-life struggles and social phenomena made the worldbuilding distinctive. Steven Tu, in his United Daily News review, called the film a milestone in the maturation of Taiwanese genre filmmaking, extolling the film's unique worldbuilding, heartwarming character arcs, and strong technical execution as creating a highly entertaining yet emotionally resonant work that exemplifies the true craft of successful genre cinema.

== Awards and nominations ==
With 11 nominations, Dead Talents Society is the most-nominated film in the 61st Golden Horse Awards.

Year	Award	Category	Nominee	Result	Ref.
2024	49th Toronto International Film Festival	People's Choice Award, Midnight Madness	—N/a	First runner-up	
2024	19th Fantastic Fest	Audience Award	—N/a	Won	
2024	19th Fantastic Fest	Best Director (Horror Features)	John Hsu	Won	
2024	57th Sitges Film Festival	Sitges Collection People's Choice Award	—N/a	Won	
2024	57th Sitges Film Festival	Focus Asia People's Choice Award	—N/a	Won	
2024	44th Hawaii International Film Festival	NETPAC Award	—N/a	Nominated	
2024	61st Golden Horse Awards	Best Narrative Feature	—N/a	Nominated	
2024	61st Golden Horse Awards	Best Director	John Hsu	Nominated	
2024	61st Golden Horse Awards	Best Supporting Actress	Sandrine Pinna	Nominated	
2024	61st Golden Horse Awards	Best Original Screenplay	John Hsu, Vincent Tsai	Nominated	
2024	61st Golden Horse Awards	Best Visual Effects	Tomi Kuo, Dylan Chiou	Nominated	
2024	61st Golden Horse Awards	Best Art Direction	Wang Chih-cheng, Liang Shuo-lin	Won	
2024	61st Golden Horse Awards	Best Makeup & Costume Design	Lore Shih	Won	
2024	61st Golden Horse Awards	Best Action Choreography	Teddy Ray Huang	Won	
2024	61st Golden Horse Awards	Best Original Film Score	The Dead Talents	Nominated	
2024	61st Golden Horse Awards	Best Original Film Song	"Dead Talents Society"	Won	
2024	61st Golden Horse Awards	Best Sound Effects	Book Chien, Tang Shiang-chu, Chen Jia-li	Nominated	
2025	18th Asian Film Awards	Best Visual Effects	Tomi Kuo, Chiu Chun-yi	Nominated	
2025	43rd Hong Kong Film Awards	Best Asian Chinese Language Film	—N/a	Nominated	
