= TVBS News =

Television channel of Taiwan

- Country: Taiwan
- Broadcast area: Worldwide
- Network: TVBS
- Headquarters: Taiwan

Programming
- Language: Mandarin
- Picture format: 1080i HDTV

Ownership
- Owner: TVBS
- Sister channels: TVBS, TVBS Entertainment Channel, TVBS Asia

History
- Launched: 2 October 1995; 30 years ago

Links
- Website: www.tvbs.com.tw

Availability

Terrestrial
- StarHub TV (Singapore): Channel 808
- Singtel TV (Singapore): Channel 516
- Sky Cable (Philippines): Channel 227

Streaming media
- YouTube: TVBS Breaking
- myTV SUPER (Hong Kong): Channel 702
- Taiwan I'm TV: (members free)
- Taiwan Webs-TV: (subscription required)
- Taiwan Yam: (all free)

TVBS News (Chinese: TVBS新聞台) is a Taiwanese pay television channel. Launched in 1995, it is the first 24-hour nationwide news channel in the country.

== Newscasts ==
Current news sections are named as follows. (All time TST)

- Morning News (Weekdays: 09:00-12:00, Weekends: 06:00-12:00)
- Good Morning Taiwan (早安台灣) (Weekdays: 05:55-09:00; Weekends: 07:00-09:00)
- Midday News (12:00-14:00)
- Afternoon News (14:00-18:00)
- Evening News (Weekdays: 18:00-20:00; Weekends: 18:00-21:00)
- News Forefront (最前線新聞) (Weekdays: 20:00-21:00)
- 2100 News (九點熱話題) (Weekdays: 21:00-21:54; Weekends: 21:00-22:00)
- 2200 News (十點不一樣) (Weekdays: 21:54-23:00; Weekends: 22:00-23:00)
- News Night (新聞夜視界) (23:00-01:00)

== Logos ==
TVBS-N logo October 2, 1994 to September 15, 2002

TVBS News logo from September 16, 2002 to December 21, 2015

== See also ==
- Television Broadcasts Limited
  - TVB News Channel
