= Dear Mom (TV series) =

- Promotional poster
- Also known as: My Four Precious Daughters
- 我的寶貝四千金
- Genre: Romance, Comedy, Family
- Created by: Sanlih E-Television
- Written by: Chen Zhao Miao 陳昭妙; Chen Kai Zhu 陳凱筑
- Directed by: Zhang Jia Xian 張佳賢 (Ep. 01-59); Eri Hao 郝心翔 (Ep. 60-84)
- Starring: Ling Hung 洪小鈴; Joanne Tseng 曾之喬; Albee Huang 小薰; Beatrice Fang 方志友; Shiou Chieh Kai 修杰楷; Melvin Sia 謝佳見; Duncan Chow 黎登勤; Jack Lee 李運慶
- Opening theme: Roller Coaster 雲霄飛車 by Dawen 王大文
- Ending theme: Lonely Light 寂寞之光 by Rachel Liang 梁文音
- Country of origin: Republic of China (Taiwan)
- Original language: Mandarin
- No. of episodes: 1 season (84 Episodes) Total = 3780 minutes

Production
- Executive producer: Liu Qiu Ping 劉秋平
- Producers: Liang Han Hui 梁漢輝; Xu Zhi Yi 徐志怡
- Production location: Taiwan
- Running time: 45 minutes
- Production companies: Sanlih E-Television 三立電視; Eastern Shine Production Co., Ltd. 東映製作

Original release
- Network: SETTV
- Release: 16 December 2014 – 13 April 2015

Related
- Love Cheque Charge 幸福兌換券; Be With You 好想談戀愛

Dear Mom (Chinese: 我的寶貝四千金; pinyin: Wǒ de bǎo bèi sì qiān jīn) is a 2014 Taiwanese television series produced by Sanlih E-Television. Starring Ling Hung, Joanne Tseng, Albee Huang, Beatrice Fang, Shiou Chieh Kai, Melvin Sia, Duncan Chow and Jack Lee as the main cast. The Chinese title literally translates to "My Four Precious Daughters", which is in reference to the four main female characters of the drama. Filming began on December 1, 2014 and was filmed as the drama aired. First original broadcast began December 16, 2014 on SETTV channel, airing weekly from Monday till Friday at 8:00-9:00 pm.

== Synopsis ==
The Li family have four precious daughters. Each is different in her own way.

- Eldest An Qing (Ling Hung) is the perfect daughter to everyone, excelling academically and successful. She lives in the US with her young son and husband, but when she returns to Taiwan she hides from her family that she has been recently divorced.
- Second daughter Yi Wan (Joanne Tseng), is obedient to her parents and kind to others. Simpleminded and a bit of a klutz, but she never worries her parents. She works as a kindergarten teacher.
- Third daughter Qing Qing (Albee Huang) is a workaholic, who at times is over confident of herself. She is the personal secretary to the CEO of a trading company. Her unbalance work/personal life makes her mother worry that she will never have time to date or find a steady boyfriend.
- Then there is fourth and youngest daughter Xiao Xi (Beatrice Fang). She is a University student who is spoiled by dad and lives a carefree life.

The four Li sisters pursue life and love differently from each other.

== Cast ==
=== Main cast ===
Main cast is played by (The Li's Daughters ) and (Four Others Boys).

=== The Li's Daughter ===
- Ling Hung 洪小鈴 as Li An Qing 黎安晴 Eldest Daughters ( Da Jie)
- Joanne Tseng 曾之喬 as Li Yi Wan 黎一彎Second Daughters (Er Jie)
- Albee Huang 小薰 as Li Qing Qing 黎清清 Third Daughters (San Jie)
- Beatrice Fang 方志友 as Li Xiao Xi 黎小溪 Younger Daughters ( Xiao Jie)

=== Four Others Boys ===
4 others boys later become couples with each The Li's daughters=

- Shiou Chieh Kai 修杰楷 as Chen Qi Le 陳其樂 ( later Li An Qing 's lover)
- Melvin Sia 謝佳見 as Du Xiao Fei 杜曉飛 ( later Li Yi Wan 's lover)
- Duncan Chow 黎登勤 as Xu Ji Kuan 徐季寬
- Jack Lee 李運慶 Zhao Yu Hang 趙宇航 (later Li Xiao Xi 's lover)

=== Supporting cast ===
- Lu Hsueh Feng 呂雪鳳 as Xu Feng Yi 許鳳儀 (The Li's daughter's mother)
- Chen Bor-jeng 陳博正 as Li Shu Guang 黎曙光 (The Li's daughter's father)
- Elten Ting 丁也恬 as Chen Tian Jiao 陳甜嬌 (Du Xiao Fei 's mother)
- Yang Ming Wei 楊銘威 as Xiao Guo Qin 蕭國欽 (Du Xiao Fei 's Bodyguard)
- Li Fang Wen 李芳雯 as Li Mei En 黎美恩 (The Li's daughter's aunt)
- Yan Yi Ping 顏怡平 as Momoko Lin Chun Tao 林春桃 (The Li's daughter's only cousin)
- Ye Hui Zhi 葉蕙芝 as 園長 Principal (Li Yi Wan 's Boss)
- Zhu You Cheng 朱宥丞 as Jerry Sun Yi Xing 孫亦星 (Li An Qing 's son)
- Stanley Mei 梅賢治 as Long Long 龍龍 (Li Yi Wan's friend or Kindergarten Teacher)
- Garfield Chung 鍾政均 as Que Shan Ming 闕山明 (Li Qing Qing's worker friend)
- Jerry Lan 蘭競恆 as Daniel ( Chen Qi Le's Worker)
- Ariel Ann as Chen Qi Pei 陳其霈 (Chen Qi Le 's younger sister)
- Jean Wang as Chen Qi Ren (Chen Qi Le's and Chen Qi Pei's older Sister)
- Jean Lee as Xu Hui Qi (Xu Ji Kuan's wife)

=== Cameo role ===
- Xiao Liang Ge 小亮哥 as Hei Mao 黑毛
- Wu Zhen Ya 吳震亞 as Motorcycle shop owner 機車行老闆
- Chen Jian An 陳建安 as Reporter 記者
- Yorke Sun 孫沁岳 as Kuo Xi Ming
- Aaron Yan as Shika
- Jeanine Yang as Yun Wei
- Wasir Chou as Wasir Ding
- Amanda Liu as Xue Lian

== Soundtrack ==
Dear Mom Original TV Soundtrack (OST)

Soundtrack album by Various artists
- Released: 6 February 2015
- Genre: Mandopop
- Language: Mandarin
- Label: Universal Music (TW)

Dear Mom Original TV Soundtrack (OST) (我的寶貝四千金 電視原聲帶 ) was released on February 6, 2015 by various artists under Universal Music (TW) record label. It contains 10 tracks total, in which 3 tracks are various alternatives versions of the original songs. The opening theme is track 1 "Roller Coaster 雲霄飛車 " by Dawen, while the closing theme is track 2 "Lonely Light 寂寞之光" by Rachel Liang.

=== Track listing ===
| No. | Title | Singer(s) | Length |
|---|---|---|---|
| 1. | "Roller Coaster" (雲霄飛車) | Dawen 王大文 | 4:01 |
| 2. | "Lonely Light" (寂寞之光) | Rachel Liang 梁文音 | 5:18 |
| 3. | "Dot Of Water" (點水) | Rainie Yang 楊丞琳 | 4:17 |
| 4. | "Wall" (牆) | Shiny 姚亦晴 | 3:37 |
| 5. | "Alone" (一個人) | Will Pan 潘瑋柏 | 4:01 |
| 6. | "Meaningless" (有什麼意義) | Dawen 王大文 | 3:51 |
| 7. | "We Will See Each Other Again" (我們會再見) | Rachel Liang 梁文音 | 4:23 |
| 8. | "Roller Coaster (Love Floating ver.)" (雲霄飛車 (愛意飄浮版)) | Dawen 王大文 | 3:43 |
| 9. | "Lonely Light (Lit Hope ver.)" (寂寞之光 (點亮希望版)) | Dawen 王大文 | 3:36 |
| 10. | "Dot Of Water (Single Minded ver.)" (點水 (一心一意版)) | Dawen 王大文 | 3:22 |

Songs not featured on the official soundtrack album.

- Small World 小世界 by Shiny 姚亦晴
- Amnesia Goldfish 失憶的金魚 by Rainie Yang 楊丞琳
- In Fact, We Deserve Happiness 其實我們值得幸福 by Rainie Yang 楊丞琳

== Development and casting ==
- On November 20, 2014, the four main female cast members (Ling Hung, Joanne Tseng, Albee Huang, and Beatrice Fang) where introduced at a press conference held at Sanlih's headquarters main lobby.
- On November 27, 2014, the four main male cast members (Shiou Chieh Kai, Melvin Sia, Duncan Lai, and Jack Lee) where introduced at a press conference held at Sanlih's headquarters rooftop garden.
- The entire extended cast was introduced at a press conference held at Sanlih's headquarters auditorium on December 15, 2014.

== Broadcast ==
| Network | Country | Airing Date | Timeslot |
|---|---|---|---|
| SETTV | Taiwan | December 16, 2014 | Monday to Friday 8:00-9:00 pm |
| ETTV | Taiwan | December 16, 2014 | Monday to Friday 9:00-10:00 pm |
| CTV | Taiwan | October 10, 2017 | Monday to Friday 8:00-10:00 pm |
| Astro Shuang Xing | Malaysia | December 31, 2014 | Sunday to Thursday 6:00-7:00 pm |
| StarHub TV | Singapore | January 19, 2015 | Monday to Friday 7:00-8:00 pm |
| Amarin TV | Thailand | November 16, 2015 | Monday to Friday 2:00-3:30 pm |

== Episode ratings ==
Competing dramas on rival channels airing at the same time slot were:
- TTV - Pure Pure, Sun After The Rain, Our Mother
- SET - Ordinary Love
- FTV - Dragon Dance, Dowry
- CTS - We Get Married, RPOGE
- CTV - Heroes of Sui and Tang Dynasties, Earth God and Earth Grandmother, The Empress of China

| Air Date | Episodes | Weekly Average Ratings | Rank |
|---|---|---|---|
| December 16–19, 2014 | 1-4 | 1.51 | 4 |
| December 22–26, 2014 | 5-9 | 1.57 | 3 |
| Dec 29, 2014-Jan 2, 2015 | 10-14 | 1.51 | 3 |
| January 5–9, 2015 | 15-19 | 1.65 | 3 |
| January 12–16, 2015 | 20-24 | 1.75 | 3 |
| January 19–23, 2015 | 25-29 | 1.78 | 3 |
| January 26–30, 2015 | 30-34 | 1.87 | 3 |
| February 2–6, 2015 | 35-39 | 1.76 | 3 |
| February 9–13, 2015 | 40-44 | -- | -- |
| February 16–20, 2015 | 45-48 | 1.38 | 3 |
| February 23–27, 2015 | 49-53 | 1.90 | 3 |
| March 2–6, 2015 | 54-58 | 2.03 | 3 |
| March 9–13, 2015 | 59-63 | 1.93 | 3 |
| March 16–20, 2015 | 64-68 | 1.94 | 3 |
| March 23–27, 2015 | 69-73 | 2.21 | 3 |
| March 30–April 3, 2015 | 74-78 | 2.19 | 3 |
| April 6–10, 2015 | 79-83 | 2.31 | 3 |
| April 13, 2015 | 84 | 2.90 | 3 |
| Average ratings | | 1.89 | |

== Awards and nominations ==
| Ceremony | Category | Nominee | Result |
|---|---|---|---|
| 2015 Sanlih Drama Awards | Best Actor Award | Melvin Sia | Nominated |
| 2015 Sanlih Drama Awards | Best Actress Award | Joanne Tseng | Nominated |
| 2015 Sanlih Drama Awards | Best Actress Award | Ling Hung | Nominated |
| 2015 Sanlih Drama Awards | Best Screen Couple Award | Melvin Sia & Joanne Tseng | Won |
| 2015 Sanlih Drama Awards | Best Kiss Award | Melvin Sia & Joanne Tseng | Nominated |
| 2015 Sanlih Drama Awards | Best Cry Award | Ling Hung & Lu Hsueh Feng | Won |
| 2015 Sanlih Drama Awards | Best Green Leaf Award | Yang Ming Wei | Won |
| 2015 Sanlih Drama Awards | Best Powerful Performance Award | Lu Hsueh Feng | Nominated |
| 2015 Sanlih Drama Awards | Best Selling S-Pop Magazine Award | Melvin Sia | Nominated |
| 2015 Sanlih Drama Awards | Best Selling S-Pop Magazine Award | Joanne Tseng | Nominated |
| 2015 Sanlih Drama Awards | Viewers Choice Drama Award | Dear Mom | Nominated |
