= Kelly Huang =

Taiwanese actress

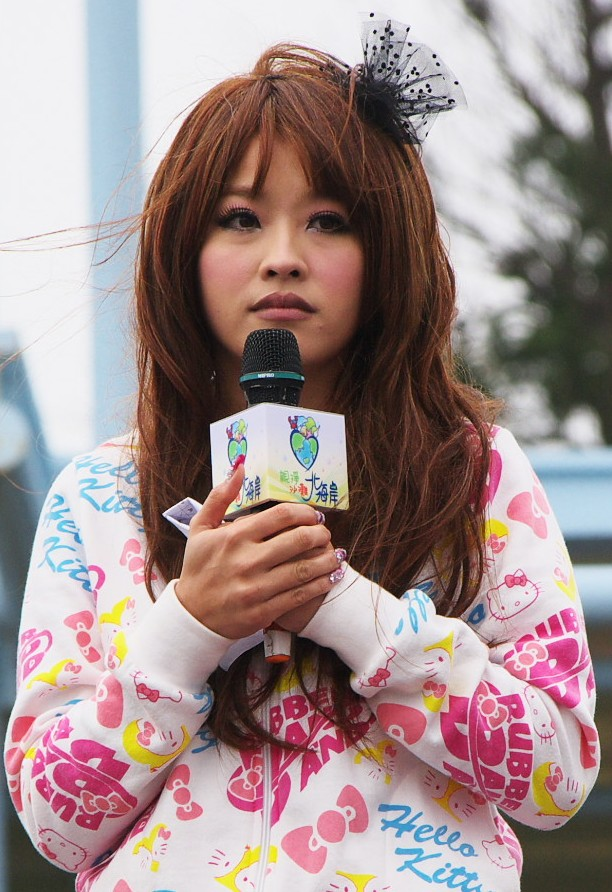
- Born: Huang Yu-hsien; 9 March 1980 (age 46); Yunlin County, Taiwan
- Occupation: actress

Chinese name
- Traditional Chinese: 小嫻
- Simplified Chinese: 小娴
Transcriptions
Standard Mandarin
- Hanyu Pinyin: Xiǎo Xián

Kelly Huang (born Huang Yu-hsien; Chinese: 小嫻; pinyin: Xiǎo Xián) is a Taiwanese actress.

== Filmography ==
=== Television series ===
Year	English title	Original title	Role	Notes
2010	Down with Love	就想賴著妳	Yang Duo	
2012	What Is Love	花是愛	Dancing instructor	
2013	Happy 300 Days	遇見幸福300天	Doctor Huang	
2018	Girl's Power series	女兵日記/女兵日記女力報到	Kao Hsiao-hsien	
