= Youth Power =

- Promotional poster
- Also known as: I am Chen Yi Jun
- 哇！陳怡君
- Genre: Political drama, Comedy, Romance
- Created by: TVBS
- Written by: Wu Luo Ying 吳洛纓
- Directed by: Zero Chou 周美玲; Qu You Ning 瞿友寧
- Starring: Tammy Chen 陳怡蓉; Yao Yuan Hao 姚元浩; Jason Tsou 鄒承恩; Nana Lee 李千娜
- Opening theme: Light and Heat 含廣告 by Wu Bai 伍佰
- Ending theme: Rose's Diary 玫瑰日記 by Wu Bai 伍佰 feat. Nana Lee 李千娜
- Country of origin: Republic of China (Taiwan)
- Original languages: Mandarin; Hokkien; English
- No. of seasons: 1
- No. of episodes: 21

Production
- Executive producer: Dai Tian Yi 戴天易
- Producers: Ke Ci Hui 柯慈輝; Wang Xian Bin 王顯彬
- Production locations: Taiwan; Sabah, Malaysia; London and Jurassic Coast, United Kingdom
- Running time: 90 minutes
- Production companies: Fantastic Production Co., Ltd. 豐采節目製作股份有限公司; TVBS 聯意製作股份有限公司

Original release
- Network: TTV; TVBS
- Release: 1 May – 18 September 2015

Related
- The New World 新世界 (TTV) Boysitter 俏摩女搶頭婚 (TVBS); Wake Up 麻醉風暴 Taste of Love 唯一繼承者

Youth Power (Chinese: 哇！陳怡君; pinyin: Wa! Chen Yi Jun) is a 2015 Taiwanese political drama, comedy, romance television series created and produced by TVBS. It stars Tammy Chen, Yao Yuan Hao, Jason Tsou, and Nana Lee as the main cast. Filming began on January 8, 2015 and wrapped up on July 21, 2015. First original broadcast began on May 1, 2015 on TTV airing every Friday night at 10:10-11:40 pm.

== Synopsis ==
Can three young people choose their own futures even when life sends them in an unexpected direction? Chen Yi Jun (Tammy Chen) grows up in a political family but detests politics and is determined to pursue her passion for music. But after college graduation, she is forced to return home and is thrown into the midst of her family drama. She teams up with her childhood friend Jiang Ye Qing (Yao Yuan Hao), who also grew up in a political family and thrives in it, and the social activist Huang Zhao Yuan (Jason Tsou). Forced to grow up among the pressures of the real world, can Yi Jun, Zhao Yuan and Ye Qing make the world bend to their own desires in life?

== Cast ==
=== Main cast ===
- Tammy Chen as Chen Yi Jun 陳怡君
- Yao Yuan-hao as Jiang Ye Qing 江也晴
- Jason Tsou as Huang Zhao Yuan 黃兆元
- Nana Lee 李千娜 as Sha Bing Na 沙冰娜

=== Supporting cast ===
- Lu Yi-ching as Lin Li Zi 林麗子
- Tsai Chen-nan as Chen Jing Sheng 陳敬昇
- Ke Shu-chin as Lian Bai He 連百合
- Da Wen as Pai Pai 拍拍
- Hank Wu as Ban Jie Ming 班傑明（Benjamin）
- Chu Lu-hao as Jiang Bian 江邊

=== Special guest actors ===
- Kenji Chen as Xia Zhi Jie 夏志傑
- Joseph Hsia as Du Shen 杜聲
- Ma Hui-chen as Zhao Yuan's mother
- Hero Tai as Chen Qi Long 陳其龍
- Akio Chen as Wan Tong 萬通
- Lung Tien-hsiang as Lin Xian Cai (Xian Zi) 林仙財（仙仔）
- Jian Chang as Liu Guang Ming 劉光明
- Wang Zi Qiang 王自強 as Ah Yong Bo 阿勇伯
- Liu Hsiao-yi as Ah Zhu 阿珠
- Cindy Yen 袁詠琳 as Su Fei 蘇菲（Sophie）
- Ke Ci Hui 柯慈輝 as Brother Mao
- Qu Xian Ping 曲獻平 as Leslie
- Wang Hong Dao 王鴻道 as Li Gan Shi 李幹事
- Chen Hui Wen 陳繪文 as Ah Hui 阿惠
- Danny Liang as Lou Ri Xin 樓日新
- Xu Zhi Wei 許志偉 as policemen
- Jiang Rui Zhi 姜瑞智 as demonstrator

=== Special performances ===
- You Xiao Bai 游小白 as store manager
- Joanne Lien as Amy
- Cheng Ping-chun as Li Tian Bao 李天寶
- Hu Jun 胡鈞 as mayor
- Hsieh Yu-wei as Yang Xian Jin 楊先進
- Chu You-ning as Zheng Zi Xiang 鄭子翔
- Tseng Hsien-chung as school principal

== Soundtrack ==
- Light and Heat 含廣告 by Wu Bai 伍佰
- Rose's Diary 玫瑰日記 by Wu Bai 伍佰 feat. Nana Lee 李千娜
- It's All Good 一切安好 by Karen Mok 莫文蔚
- Even If 哪怕 by Karen Mok 莫文蔚
- Regardez 看看 by Karen Mok 莫文蔚
- Fight For Dream 強心臟 by Boxing Yue Tuan Boxing樂團
- Think of Home 思故鄉 by Boxing Yue Tuan Boxing樂團

== Broadcast ==
| Network | Country | Airing Date | Timeslot |
|---|---|---|---|
| TTV | Taiwan | May 1, 2015 (until July 7, 2015) | Friday 10:10-11:40 pm |
| TTV | Taiwan | July 24, 2015 (until September 11, 2015) | Friday 10:15-11:45 pm |
| TTV | Taiwan | September 18, 2015 | Friday 10:00-11:30 pm |
| TVBS | Taiwan | May 2, 2015 | Saturday 10:00-11:30 pm |
| Astro Shuang Xing | Malaysia | September 10, 2015 (until September 24, 2015) | Sunday to Thursday 4:00-5:00 pm |
| Astro Shuang Xing | Malaysia | September 25, 2015 | Monday to Friday 4:00-5:00 pm |

== Episode ratings ==
Competing dramas on rival channels airing at the same time slot were:

- SET Taiwan - Life of Pearl, An Adopted Daughter
- FTV - Justice Heroes
- SETTV - Murphy's Law of Love, Love Cuisine
- CTV - Crime Scene Investigation Center, Doctor Stranger

| Air Date | Episode | Average Ratings | Rank |
|---|---|---|---|
| May 1, 2015 | 1 | 0.49 | 4 |
| May 8, 2015 | 2 | -- | -- |
| May 15, 2015 | 3 | -- | -- |
| May 22, 2015 | 4 | -- | -- |
| May 29, 2015 | 5 | -- | -- |
| Jun 5, 2015 | 6 | 0.50 | 4 |
| Jun 12, 2015 | 7 | -- | -- |
| Jun 19, 2015 | 8 | -- | -- |
| Jun 26, 2015 | 9 | -- | -- |
| Jul 3, 2015 | 10 | -- | -- |
| Jul 10, 2015 | 11 | -- | -- |
| Jul 17, 2015 | 12 | -- | -- |
| Jul 24, 2015 | 13 | -- | -- |
| Jul 31, 2015 | 14 | -- | -- |
| Aug 7, 2015 | 15 | -- | -- |
| Aug 14, 2015 | 16 | 0.82 | 4 |
| Aug 21, 2015 | 17 | -- | -- |
| Aug 28, 2015 | 18 | -- | -- |
| Sep 4, 2015 | 19 | -- | -- |
| Sep 11, 2015 | 20 | 0.92 | 4 |
| Sep 18, 2015 | 21 | -- | -- |
| Average ratings | | 0.68 | |

== Awards and nominations ==
| Year | Ceremony | Category | Nominee | Result |
|---|---|---|---|---|
| 2016 | 51st Golden Bell Awards | Best Supporting Actor in a Television Series | Jason Tsou | Nominated |
| 2016 | 51st Golden Bell Awards | Best Supporting Actress in a Television Series | Ke Shu Qin | Nominated |
