= Happy 300 Days =

- Promo poster
- Also known as: 300 Days to Meet Happiness
- 遇見幸福300天
- Genre: Romance; Comedy
- Created by: Taiwan Television (TTV)
- Written by: Jian Qi Feng; Lin Xin Hui; Li Jie Yu
- Directed by: Zhang Jia Xian
- Starring: Tammy Chen; Kingone Wang; KunDa Hsieh; Kaiser Chuang; Grace Ko
- Opening theme: "Happy 300 Days 遇見幸福三百天" by Kingone Wang
- Ending theme: "Happy Person 幸福者" by Jie Wei Ling
- Country of origin: Taiwan
- Original languages: Mandarin; Taiwanese
- No. of series: 1
- No. of episodes: 15

Production
- Executive producer: Huang Wan Bo
- Producer: Pan Yi Qun
- Production location: Taiwan
- Running time: 90 minutes
- Production company: Bethel Production Company

Original release
- Network: TTV, TTV HD
- Release: 8 March – 21 June 2013

Related
- An Innocent Mistake; A Good Wife

Happy 300 Days (Chinese: 遇見幸福300天; pinyin: Yù jiàn xìng fú sānbǎi tiān) is a 2013 Taiwanese romantic-comedy television drama series created and produced by TTV, starring Tammy Chen and Kingone Wang as the main leads with KunDa Hsieh, Kaiser Chuang and Grace Ko in supporting roles. The title is in reference to the main characters anticipation in meeting their unborn child which they nickname "Happiness". The drama began filming on January 4, 2013 and finished on April 19, 2013, it was filmed while it aired. Original first broadcast began on March 8, 2013 during TTV's standard and HD channels 10:00-11:30 p.m. timeslot airing every Friday night and final episode airing on June 21, 2013 with 15 episodes total.

== Synopsis ==
A single woman decides to quit her job and leave her big city life behind to return to her childhood home when she suddenly finds out she is pregnant with her ex-boyfriend's child. Back in her hometown she encounters three men that she had recently cross path with that has also just arrived from the big city, but trouble ensues when each of these men falls in love with her and wants to be the father of her unborn child.

== Plot summary ==
Chen Ya Ting (Tammy Chen) suddenly finds out she is pregnant with her cheating ex-boyfriend's child. After deciding that she will keep her baby and raise it on her own, she quits her job as a hotel customer representative at a fancy hotel in Taipei in order to move back to her hometown of Kenting, a seaside vacationing town, to live with her mother Gigi (Grace Ko) who owns and manages a run down vacationing inn call "Spring Breeze". There she meets three men she had recently encountered in Taipei.

Talented interior designer Qi Tian (Kingone Wang) is recently out of a job when his arrogant and uncompromising attitude causes his boss to lose an important client. Bored at home, he is excited when he receives a phone call from Gigi who sounds like a promising client. She lies to him that she owns a grand hotel and is looking for a famous interior designer to give it a total makeover. Once Qi Tian arrives in Kenting he wants to leave immediately when he sees Gigi's "Spring Breeze" inn, but is unable to because he is stuck there when his car got damaged during the journey. At the inn he meets Ya Ting who he is instantly attracted to, but later finds out that they were former high school classmates who he was in love with, because of his over 50 self-centered love confession letters to her she rejected his love back than. After finding out that his idol was a designer of "Spring Breeze", he agrees to stay and take on the project to redesign it.

Small time triad gangster Zhang Yao Yang (KunDa Hsieh) is on the run from the authorities when he thinks he has killed someone. He arrives in Kenting by accident when he gets nervous after seeing a policeman headed his way on the train and decides to get off at the next stop. He meets Ya Ting at the local market while trying to get away from police and falls in love with her at first sight. Not wanting to let her get away, he follows her all the way to the "Spring Breeze" inn where he takes up residency and later becomes the chef when Gigi discovers his talent for cooking.

Ding Hao Quan (Kaiser Chuang) was a respected doctor and surgeon in pediatrics, but due to the death of a patient during surgery he is traumatized and loses his confidence. Turning to alcohol to cope with his inner pain he tries to commit suicide on the roof deck of the hotel that Ya Ting works at in Taipei. After Ya Ting talks him out of suicide he talks her out of aborting her child. He arrives in Kenting to visit the grave site and pay his respect to his patient. While trying to commit suicide again by jumping off a boat, Qi Tian saves his life and brings him back to the "Spring Breeze" inn.

When the three men find out that Ya Ting is pregnant and unwed, they think of a plan to help her since she is afraid of letting her mother Gigi know because Gigi was also an unwed mother and made her daughter Ya Ting promised not to follow the same path as her. Yao Yang, who is the first to fall in love with Ya Ting, plans to pretend to be the father of her unborn child, but his idea is announced first to Gigi by Qi Tian.

Soon Ya Ting and Qi Tian marry to follow through with the lie. With the two pretending to be a married couple, each day they begin to fall more in love with each other, but both with their stubborn personalities refuse to admit their feelings to one another. Their relationship is also complicated by Yao Yang and Hao Quan being in love with Ya Ting and wanting to take Qi Tian's place as the pretend father. Also Qi Tian having an ex-girlfriend that won't let go and accept that he is married to someone else.

== Cast ==
=== Main cast ===
- Tammy Chen as Chen Ya Ting

A hotel customer representative who quits her job and goes back to her childhood home to live with her mother when she finds out she is pregnant with her ex-boyfriend's child. She and Qi Tian were high school classmates who she found annoying and conceited. Afraid that her mother will be furious with her if she finds out that she is also a unwed mother she agrees to let Qi Tian lie and pretend to be the father of her unborn child.

- Kingone Wang as Qi Tian

A talented but arrogant interior designer. He is fired from his job when his uncompromised attitude causes his design firm to lose an important client. Bored at home he is conned by Gigi to take her on as a client. He was in love with Ya Ting when they were high school classmate, but she rejected him because in each of his love letters to her he wrote it in a self-centered tone. He volunteers to be Ya Ting's unborn child's father because of what his college ex-girlfriend did to their unborn child.

- KunDa Hsieh as Zhang Yao Yang

A small time gangster. He escapes to Ya Ting's hometown when he thinks he has killed a man while trying to collect a debt from him. An orphan who joined a triad gang when the triad boss paid for his died grandmother's medical bills. He falls in love with Ya Ting at first sight and goes to the "Spring Breeze Inn" to look for her. Gigi discovers his talent for cooking and hires him as the chef at the inn.

- Kaiser Chuang as Ding Hao Quan

A respected doctor, he losses his confidence when one of his patients dies during surgery for the first time. Unable to cope with the trauma he turns to alcoholism. He meets Ya Ting when she saves him from committing suicide and later goes to Ya Ting's hometown to visit the grave site of his patient.

=== Supporting cast ===
- Grace Ko as Chen Xiu Zhi

Ya Ting's mother. She owns the "Spring Breeze Inn" that is later renamed "The Light Inn" which she inherited from her father. Her unique but tacky decorating style causes customers to not want to go to her inn. In order to try to get customers to her inn she tricks Qi Tian into taking her on as a client. Like Ya Ting, she was a unwed single mother.

- Jenna Wang as Joanne Xu Xin Ping

Qi Tian's college ex-girlfriend. Not wanting to be tied down after college she does the unthinkable to her and Qi Tian's unborn child in order to advance in her career which leads Qi Tian to break up and hate her. She constantly uses her connections to give Qi Tian work and recognition in hopes that he will forgive her and reconcile with her.

- Albee Liu as Mi mi

A nurse that works in a small clinic in Ya Ting's hometown. She admires and likes Ding Hao Quan because he gave her confidence and encouragement while she was training to be a nurse.

- Wang Dao as Ding father's

Ding Hao Quan's father.

- Bao Zheng Fang as Ding's mother

Ding Hao Quan's mother.

- Ding Qiang as Grandpa You

A tourist that has always stayed at the "Spring Breeze Inn" when he visits Ya Ting's hometown with his wife. His real name is Zhou Míng Da but due to his wife's accident she only has memories prior to meeting him so he pretends to be her previous husband in order to make her happy.

- Ma Zhi Qin as Grandma You

A tourist that stays at the "Spring Breeze Inn" whenever she visits Ya Ting's hometown with her husband. Due to an accident she does not have any memories of her current husband so he takes her previous husband's name in fear that she will leave him.

- Guo Yao Ren as Da Fei

One of Zhang Yao Yang's triad followers who was with him when he thought he had killed a debtor they were trying to collect from.

- Yao Chun Yao as Shan Ji

One of Zhang Yao Yang's triad followers who was with him when he thought he had killed a debtor they were trying to collect from.

- Michael Huang as Bao Ge

Yao Yang's triad boss who took Yao Yang in when his grandmother died and he helped to pay all her medical bills. He finds Yao Yang hiding at "The Light Inn" and forces him back into a life as a gangster.

- Kelly Huang as Doctor Huang

Ya Ting's gynecologist who is with her throughout her pregnancy.

- Hope Lin as Hao Si Yi

Ya Ting's boss at the "H Hotel". She hires Ya Ting as a temporary event planner at the hotel.

- YuYu Xuan as Xiao Xing Fu

Ya Ting's daughter at age 5. Wanting to know who her father is she sneaks off to Taipei to look for Qi Tian.

=== Cameos ===
- Wu Chun as himself

A celebrity that Ya Ting is a huge fan of. Ya Ting meets him while he is filming a commercial at the hotel she works at.

- Ken Huang as debtor

A debtor that Zhang Yao Yang is trying to collect from. When a bottle hits his face and causes him to pass out, Yao Yang mistakes that he had killed him.

- Duncan Chow as Jun Jie

Qi Tian's college classmate that is now an editor for an interior design magazine. He goes to the refurbished "The Light Inn" to do a cover story on Qi Tian.

- Bao Wei Ming as John

Qi Tian's long suffering former boss who has put up with Qi Tian for many years but decides to fire him when Qi Tian causes him to lose an important client.

- Liu Er Jin as Client

A client of Qi Tian. Qi Tian becomes annoyed with him due to his constant phone calls during his presentation to him and also asking Qi Tian to change his designs.

- Angel Chen as Ya Ting's co-worker

Ya Ting's fellow co-worker at the "Capital Hotel" who becomes annoyed with Qi Tian due to his nitpicking requests.

- Monica Yin as Ah Jiao

Zhang Yao Yang's ex-girlfriend who he always ask for money when he is on the run. She gives him money one last time and request that he never comes looking for her again.

- Shen Shi Hua as Gynecologist

Ya Ting's doctor who lets her know that she is pregnant.

- Zhu De Gang as Uncle Dong

A residence at Ya Ting's hometown who comes to pick her up from the train station.

- Gina Lin as Xiao Yao Ji

Gigi's next door neighbor. Gigi does not like her because all the tourist flock to her inn since it is better decorated then Gigi's.

- Kao Ying Hsuan as Jia Hao

Ya Ting's cheating ex-boyfriend. When he finds out that Ya Ting is pregnant with his child he tries to force her to abort it.

- Wang Man Jiao as Grandma Ya Ting

A patient of Ding Hao Quan that has the same exact name as Ya Ting.

== Soundtrack ==
Happy 300 Days TV Drama Soundtrack (OST)

Soundtrack album by Various artists
- Released: 31 May 2013
- Genre: Mandopop
- Language: Mandarin
- Label: Warner Music Taiwan

Happy 300 Days TV Drama Soundtrack (OST) (遇見幸福300天 電視原聲帶) was released on May 31, 2013 by various artists under Warner Music Taiwan. It contains 10 tracks total, in which 3 tracks are various instrumental versions of the songs. The opening theme is track 1 "Happy 300 Days 遇見幸福三百天" performed by Kingone Wang, while the closing theme is track 2 "Happy Person 幸福者" by Jie Wei Ling.

=== Track listing ===
No.	Title	Singer(s)	Length
1.	"Happy 300 Days" (遇見幸福三百天)	Kingone Wang	4:12
2.	"Happy Person" (幸福者)	Jie Wei Ling	4:44
3.	"Small Yet Fortunate" (小確幸)	Angel Chen	3:16
4.	"Baby Fast Asleep (female ver.)" (寶貝快睡(女版))	Jie Wei Ling	3:50
5.	"Under the Stars"	Ming Bridges	4:04
6.	"Baby Fast Asleep (male ver.)" (寶貝快睡(男版))	Kingone Wang	4:07
7.	"Some Boys Can't Be Loved" (有些男孩不能愛)	Ming Bridges	4:28
8.	"Happy 300 Days (KALA ver.)" (遇見幸福三百天 (KALA 版))	Instrumental	4:10
9.	"Happy Person (KALA ver.)" (幸福者 (KALA 版))	Instrumental	4:44
10.	"Baby Fast Asleep (KALA ver.)" (寶貝快睡 (KALA 版))	Instrumental	3:54

== Filming locations ==
Happy 300 Days was filmed entirely on location in Taiwan. Majority of filming took place in Kenting located in Pingtung County and Taipei. The hostel depicted and where all the main characters lives is actually a fully functional vacationing hotel called "The Light Inn" located in Kenting Township.

=== Taipei, Taiwan ===
- Zhongshan District
  - Capital Hotel
  - Shin-Kong Mitsukoshi Department Store

=== Pingtung, Taiwan ===
- Kenting Township
  - The Light Inn
  - Zhutian Station 竹田車站
  - H Resort Hotel
  - Hengchun Christian Hospital
  - National Museum of Marine Biology & Aquarium

== Broadcast ==
Channel	Country	Broadcast date	Timeslot
TTV/TTV HD	Taiwan	March 8, 2013	Friday 10:00-11:30 p.m.
STAR	Taiwan	May 31, 2013	Friday 10:00-11:30 p.m.

== Episode ratings ==
Competing dramas on rival channels airing at the same time slot were:

- SETTV - Just You
- SET - Father's Wish, Flavor of Life
- FTV - Independent Heroes
- CTV - True Love 365

Broadcast date	Episode	Average ratings	Peak rating	Ranking	Total episode rating
March 8, 2013	1	0.38	0.77	3	0.21
March 15, 2013	1^{1}	0.45	0.68	-	0.20
March 22, 2013	2	0.62	0.89	3	0.28
March 29, 2013	3	0.66	0.87	3	0.30
April 5, 2013	4	0.89	1.17	3	0.24
April 12, 2013	5	0.75	1.03	3	0.22
April 19, 2013	6	0.74	1.02	3	0.32
April 26, 2013	7	0.82	1.19	3	0.21
May 3, 2013	8	0.73	1.08	3	0.17
May 10, 2013	9	0.81	1.13	3	0.21
May 17, 2013	10	0.87	1.14	3	0.27
May 24, 2013	11	0.82	1.23	3	0.25
May 31, 2013	12	0.76	1.04	3	0.25
June 7, 2013	13	0.70	1.02	3	0.24
June 14, 2013	14	1.00	1.57	3	0.31
June 21, 2013	15	0.97	1.40	4	0.24
Average rating		0.77	-	-	0.25

^Note 1: Episode 1 was re-broadcast a week after the drama began airing on March 8, 2013 due to the 2013 World Baseball Classic games airing at the same time.
