= TVBS-Asia =

- Country: Taiwan
- Broadcast area: Asia (Except Taiwan), Americas, Europe, Middle East, Africa Eurasia, South Asia, and Australia, New Zealand, Papua New Guinea, Fiji, Samoa, Solomon Islands, Vanuatu, Tuvalu, Guam, French Polynesia, New Caledonia, and Cook Islands
- Network: TVBS
- Headquarters: Taipei City, Taiwan

Programming
- Picture format: 16:9 576i (SDTV); 16:9 1080i (HDTV)

Ownership
- Sister channels: TVBS News

History
- Launched: 2 June 1997; 28 years ago

Availability

Terrestrial
- StarHub TV (Singapore): Channel 828
- Singtel TV (Singapore): Channel 507
- Sky Cable (Philippines): Channel 228

Streaming media
- myTV SUPER (Hong Kong): Channel 601 (HD)

TVBS-Asia is a satellite cable channel operated by TVBS in Taiwan, launched on June 2, 1997, but only broadcasts abroad.

== See also ==
- TVBS-NEWS
- TVBS Entertainment Channel
