= Formula 17 =

- Theatrical poster
- Directed by: Chen Yinjung
- Written by: Rady Fu
- Produced by: Aileen Li; Roger Huang; Michelle Yeh
- Starring: Tony Yang; Duncan Chow; Jin Qin; Dada Ji; Jason Chang; Jimmy Yang
- Cinematography: Zac Gu
- Edited by: Chen Hsiaotong
- Music by: George Chen; Hung Tzeli
- Distributed by: Strand Releasing
- Release date: April 2, 2004 (Taiwan)
- Running time: 93 min.
- Languages: Mandarin, Cantonese
- Box office: $10.760.000

Formula 17 (Chinese: 17歲的天空; pinyin: Shíqī Suì de Tiānkōng) is a 2004 Taiwanese film directed by Chen Yinjung. It stars Tony Yang, Duncan Chow, King Chin, Dada Ji, Jimmy Yang, and Jason Chang. It is a gay romantic comedy film about Chou Tien Tsai, a romantic Taiwanese young man who takes a trip to visit an online boyfriend in person for the first time. Finding his internet relationship unsuitable for his real life, he moves on with his life and rooms with an old time friend of his. The film describes Tien's experiences with his loyal roommate and his friends, and a surprising relationship that he develops with the local "Playboy".

== Plot ==
Naïve country bumpkin Chou Tien Tsai (Tony Yang) goes to Taipei to meet an internet friend face-to-face. Being a romantic, and believing in 'true love' (he even has a book called Love Is A Kind Of Faith), he is sorely disappointed when his internet friend, Kevin, suggests they have sex with no love. Tien instead goes to a bar and runs into his ex-classmate Yu (Jin Qin) and Yu's friend CC (Dada Ji). In the same bar, he encounters the 'Number One Playboy' Bai Tieh Nan (Duncan Chow), who is notorious for one night stands. Despite professing his dislike for 'men who play with love', Tien can't help being drawn to Bai.

Tien becomes roommates with Yu. Yu enlists another friend, Alan (James Yun), to try and set Tien up with someone so he'll lose his virginity, but their efforts fail against Tien's unyielding belief in saving himself for true love. Tien later gets a job as a clubhouse attendant, where he has several run-ins with Bai, who seems to like Tien mutually. Despite warnings from his friends and rumors about Bai's past, Tien very quickly develops a liking towards Bai. Scenes with Bai and his psychologist show that Bai has a problem kissing people despite having no qualms about sleeping with them. After being advised to practice kissing a mirror and then a mannequin, both of which fail to help him, he tries to kiss his longtime friend, Jun (Jason Chang), but can't bring himself to do it. One night, Tien shows up at Bai's doorstep and they end up kissing and having sex. True to his nature, Bai disappears the next day, leaving Jun to turn up at his house and explain to Tien that 'he hopes you don't misunderstand', causing Tien to misunderstand the situation. Tien, hurt and unknowing of the entire story behind Bai's intimacy issues, leaves a message saying that 'this kind of misunderstanding won't happen again'. Later, Bai, who would like to make amends with Tien, is thwarted from doing so before having to leave for an important business trip.

After failing to reach Bai by phone, Tien prepares to leave his roommate's dwelling and return to his own home. Meanwhile, Tien's friends corner Bai and Jun as they get back from the business trip. They ask Bai to tell them the truth, but Bai is very resistant to tell the story, so Jun decides to share instead. As a young boy, Bai was told by a fortune teller that he is cursed and that anything that he loves will be doomed. A lifetime of self-fulfilling this prophecy is what led Bai to become a serial one-night stander and lose his ability to love. Falling in love with Tien caught Bai off guard and, as a result, they both suffered. After a silent prayer for a second chance, he sees T'ien heading up an escalator. His first attempt to apologize fails, and Tien literally runs away. He nearly gets run down by a scooter, but Bai saves him and they make up.

The ending credits include a short segment on Yu, CC, and Alan and their somewhat stereotyped views upon gay fashion.

== Cast ==
- Tony Yang as Chou Tien Tsai
- Duncan Chow as Bai Tieh Nan/Richard Bai
- Jin Qin as Yu
- Jason Chang as Jun
- Dada Ji as C.C.
- Jimmy Yang as Alan
- Jeff Locker as Ray
- Ladder Yu as Kevin
- Huang Guanjie as Jay
- Yang Tzelong as The Plumber

== Reception ==
The film was the highest grossing fiction film in Taiwan in 2004. However, it was banned in Singapore because it "portrayed homosexuality as normal, and a natural progression of society".

== See also ==
- List of gay-related movies
