= Duncan Chow =

Hong kong actor

- Born: Duncan Lai (黎登勤); September 19, 1978 (age 47); British Hong Kong
- Other name: D.C.
- Education: University of Auckland
- Occupations: Athlete, Model, Actor
- Years active: 1993-present
- Website: https://www.facebook.com/DuncanchowDC/

Duncan Chow (Chinese: 周群達; born Duncan Lai (黎登勤), September 19, 1978) is a Hong Kong-born actor who is popular in Taiwan. Chow was originally a professional windsurfer and a fashion show model, but chose acting as a career in 2001. He rose to fame by starring in 2004's Taiwanese Hit Movie "Formula 17", a comedy film about homosexuality.

== Early life ==
Chow was born in Cheung Chau, Hong Kong. His father, Lai Gun, who is one of the first windies in Hong Kong, taught him windsurfing and also established Cheung Chau Windsurfing Center, a famous destination for many lovers of windsurfing. Duncan is the cousin of former Hong Kong olympian Lee Lai Shan. He was former Hong Kong Windsurfing Team member, won the 1998 Asian Windsurfing Championships.

He began his acting career at the age of 14 as the adolescent version of Bruce Lee in a tribute film called Dragon: The Bruce Lee Story in 1993. His scene appeared at the very beginning of the movie.

At the age of 15, Chow went to New Zealand to study. In an interview, he said that the reason why he choose New Zealand as a place to study abroad was because it was the country of most extreme sports. When Duncan was 18, he returned to Hong Kong in a vacation and went casting with a friend, then he was chosen to shoot a Television advertisement for FedEx. He became a freelance model and appeared in many different TVCs.

== Acting career ==
Chow officially started his professional acting career with the 2000s film "I Do", co-starred with Ella Koon, Bobo Chan, Raymond Wong. After this film, it was rumoured that he had a relationship with Bobo Chan.

In early 2000s, he decided to move to Taiwan to develop his career. He appeared frequently in many Taiwanese TV Dramas. With the success of Formula 17, he gained popular recognition in 2004. One year later, he starred as Mulang in Tsui Hark's film Seven Swords - which was another box office success. In the same year, he played Smiley Dentist in The Shoe Fairy (Mermaid Blossom), co-starred with Vivian Hsu. Duncan was expected to become a new generation idol of Taiwanese Wave. Unfortunately, because of a scandal in late 2005, his career interrupted for several years. In 2009, he came back to Hong Kong to work as interior designer.

In 2012, Chow returned to Taiwan to join in TV series "What is love?" at the age of 34. He said in an interview about the comeback that he really missed acting and would like to take time when he was still young. Luckily, since 2012, many TV dramas in which he appeared have been very successful.

In 2014, CHow starred in Jess Lee's Music Video "Cliff to the Heaven", in which he played a married man who had an affair with his brother's fiancée (played by Xu Naihan). The MV contained a lot of hot scenes between Duncan and Xu Naihan, which made it extremely controversy. This MV has reached over 43 million views on YouTube (April, 2017). This gave Chow to drastically change into a more mature and seductive image.

Chow also returned back to Hong Kong to participate in a Gary Tang television series named "The Hiddens", co-starring many Hong Kong popular actors and actresses (Jessica Hsuan, Lawrence Ng, Michael Tao, William So).

In 2017, Chow also appeared in another Hong Kong TV Series called "反黑" (OCTB).

== Filmography ==
=== Film ===
- Miss Shampoo (2023)
- Plurality (2021)
- My Missing Valentine (2020)
- High Flash (2018)
- Taste of Life (205)
- Big Hug (2014)
- Shoe Fairy (2006)
- Seven Swords (2005)
- Formula 17 (2004)
- Love Me If You Can (2003)
- Leaving in Sorrow (2002)
- I Do (2001)
- Dragon: The Bruce Lee Story (1993)

=== Television ===
Year	TV Show	Character	Partners	Region
2001	Devils' Blues		Jade Leung, Tai Ping Hui	Singapore, Hong Kong, Taiwan
2001	Six Friends		Xiao S	Taiwan
2001	Peach Girl	Lu Wu Lang	Vanness Wu, Annie Wu	Taiwan
2002	Come to my place	Cameo	F4	Taiwan
2002	Purple Corner			Taiwan
2002	Two-faced Godfather		Bobby Dou, Joyce Tsang	Taiwan
2002	Odyssey	Tang President	Bobby Dou, Beatrice Hsu	Taiwan
2003	Hi! Working Girl	Heavenly King's manager	Ken Chu, Jolin Tsai, Show Lo	Taiwan
2003	Heart Train			Taiwan
2004	Lover of Herb	Yang Shou Zhi		Taiwan
2004	The legend of speed	Du Bian Si / Ah Si	Rainie Yang	Taiwan
2006	Hua Yang Shao Nian Shao Nu (Hana Kimi)	Yuan Qiu Ye (Cameo)		Taiwan
2007	The Gold Convoyers (Biao Hang Tian Xia)	Wang Zhenwei	David Chiang, Wu Xiao Min, Ken Chang, Zhao Liying	Mainland China
2008	Prince + Princess 2	Teacher		Taiwan
2008	Magnolia Flower	Chen Xi	Annie Wu, Stephanie Xiao	Taiwan
2010	The Winner is King	A Mao	Julien Cheung, Ada Choi	Hong Kong
2011	Medical Examiner Shinomiya Hazuki (Season 10)	Yusuke Tsuruta		Japan
2012	Mameshiba Ichiro Futen no Shiba Jiro	Gondo Shigeru		Japan
2012	What is love	Zhang Shao Qian	Jade Chou, Chris Wu	Taiwan
2012	Lady Maid Maid	Luo Jia Liang / "Andy Lo"		Taiwan
2013	Falling	Zhang Lu Huai	Jade Chou, Esther Liu	Taiwan
2013	Happy 300 Days	Jun Jie		Taiwan
2014	Mr. Right Wanted	Cameo		Taiwan
2014-2015	Dear Mom	Xu Ji Kuan	Xiao Xun, Linh Hong, Joane Tsang	Taiwan
2015	Love Cuisine	Wen Zhen Yu	Lego Lee, Allison Lin, Nita Lei	Taiwan
2016	Rock Records in Love	Kevin	Lego Lee	Taiwan
2016	The Hiddens	Chen Chi Keung	Jessica Hsuan, Lawrence Ng, Michael Tao, William So, Wylie Chiu, Lu Jing-Jing	Hong Kong
2017	OCTB		Jordan Chan, Danny Chan	Hong Kong

== Other shows ==
- The Hiddens (TVB, 2016)
- Rock Records in Love (2016)
- Love Cuisine (SETTV, 2015)
- Dear Mom (SETTV, 2014)
- Happy 300 Days (TTV, 2013)
- Falling (PTS, 2013)
- Lady Maid Maid (SETTV, 2012)
- Mameshiba Ichiro Futen no Shiba Jiro (KBS 2012)
- What is love (Supporting role) (2012)
- Medical Examiner Shinomiya Hazuki (TV Tokyo, 2011)
- Hua Yang Shao Nian Shao Nu (CTS / GTV, 2006)
- Hanazakarino Kimitachihe (Guest Star) (2006)
- The Legend of Speed (CTV, 2004)
- Lover of Herb (TVBS-G, 2004)
- Hi! Working Girl (CTV, 2003)
