= Beatrice Fang =

Taiwanese actress

- 方志友
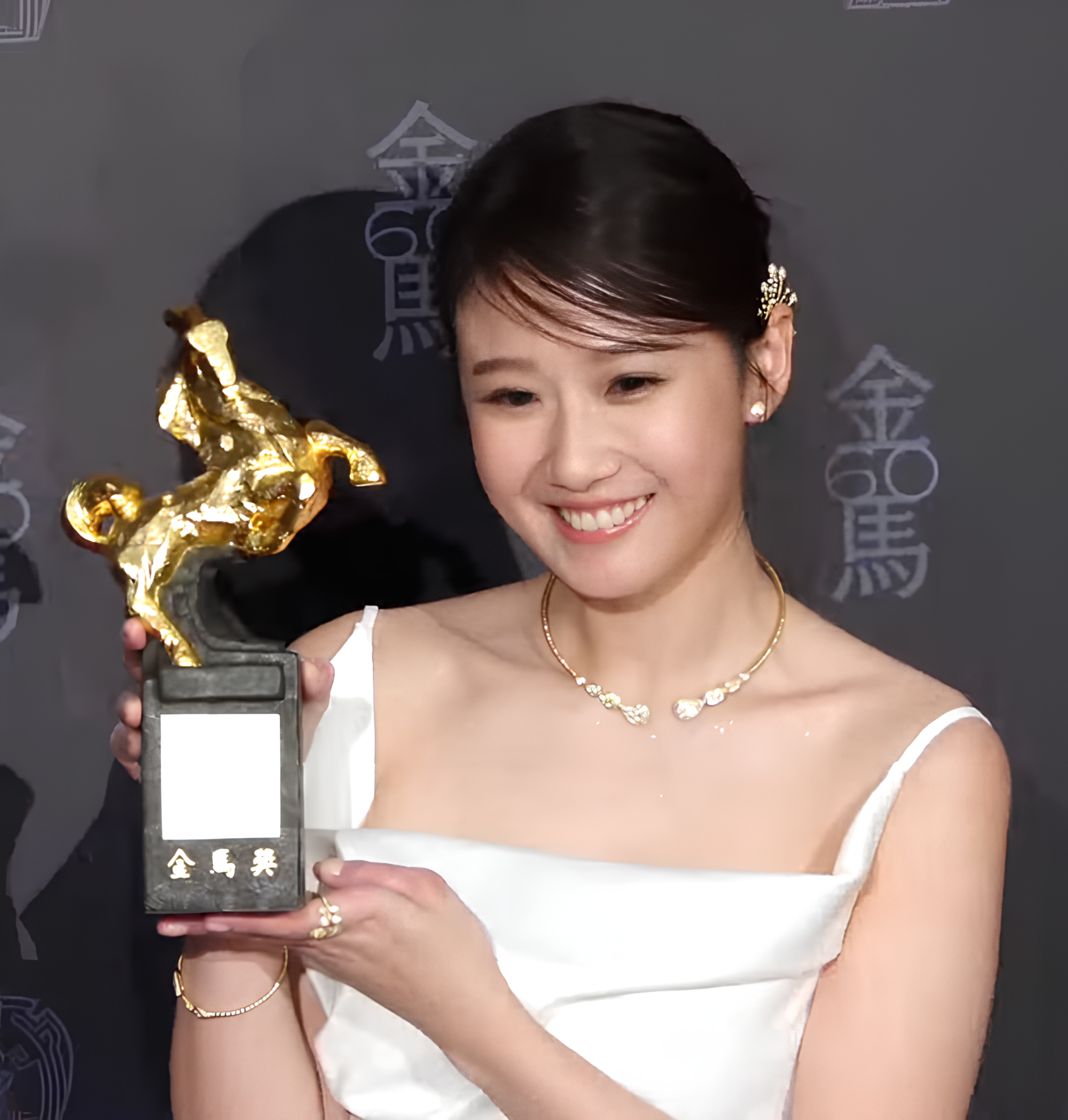
- Fang in 2023
- Born: 30 December 1990 (age 35); Taiwan
- Education: Fu Jen Catholic University (BA)
- Occupation: Actress
- Spouse: Yang Ming-wei (m. 2016)
- Children: 2

Beatrice Fang (Chinese: 方志友; pinyin: Fāng Zhìyǒu) is a Taiwanese actress.

== Education ==
Fang obtained her bachelor's degree in Italian literature from Fu Jen Catholic University.

== Filmography ==
=== Film ===
Year	English title	Original title	Role	Notes
2011	You Are the Apple of My Eye			
2012	Bad Girls	女孩坏坏	Xiao Mi	
2016	Where the River Flows			
2017	Woman on the Cross			
2018	Nana's Game			
2022	My Best Friend's Breakfast	我吃了那男孩一整年的早餐	Food outlet owner	Special appearance
2023	Day Off	本日公休	A-ling	

=== Television series ===
Year	English title	Original title	Role	Notes	Ref.
2012	As the Bell Rings	課間好時光 1年2班	Di Di		
2014	Dear Mom	我的寶貝四千金	Li Xiao Xi		
2014	Fall in Love with Me	愛上兩個我	Li Huan Huan		
2014	Kiss Me, Mom!	媽，親一下！	Lin Yuxuan 林郁萱/萱萱	A University Student, about 20 years old, pairs up with Evan Yo	
2016	Love By Design	必勝練習生	Jiang Yi-shu		
2021	Girl's Power	女力報到－愛情公寓/男人止步2/愛的故事	Yao Ya-quan		
2025	The Good, The Bad and The Ugly	舊金山美容院	Jiang Zhilu		

== Personal life ==
Fang met with her boyfriend Yang Ming-wei in 2014 during the shooting of Dear Mom. In April 2015, Fang was engaged to Yang and in August 2015 she delivered her first baby. On 13 January 2016, Fang married Yang. In June 2017, Fang announced her second child pregnancy. On August 10, 2026, Bang and her husband, Yang Mingwei, announced that they had divorced by mutual agreement. Bang stated that they had decided to end their marriage after lengthy discussions and careful consideration. She expressed gratitude for the 11 years they had spent supporting and caring for each other, and said that they would remain a family despite no longer being romantic partners.

== Awards and nominations ==
Year	Award	Category	Nominated Work	Result	Ref.
2023	60th Golden Horse Awards	Best Supporting Actress	Day Off	Won	
2024	59th Golden Bell Award	Best Supporting Actress	Living	Nominated	
