= Taste of Love (Taiwanese TV series) =

2015 Taiwanese television series

- Promo poster
- 唯一繼承者
- Genre: Romance, Comedy
- Created by: Television Broadcasts Satellite
- Written by: Ka Fei Yin 咖啡因; Kuo Shi Wei 郭世偉
- Directed by: Chen Dong Han 陳東漢
- Starring: Ray Chang 張睿家; Vivian Sung 宋芸樺; Hero Tai 戴祖雄; Ching Yang 楊晴
- Opening theme: Wind Blowing 風起 by Miu Chu 朱俐靜
- Ending theme: I'm Still Here 等一個人到老 by Ian Chen 陳彥允 (Episode 1-7); My Way by Miu Chu 朱俐靜 (Episode 8-15)
- Country of origin: Republic of China (Taiwan)
- Original languages: Mandarin; Cantonese; Taiwanese; English; Korean
- No. of seasons: 1
- No. of episodes: 15

Production
- Producers: Liu Si Ming 劉思銘, Dai Tian Yi 戴天易
- Production locations: Taiwan, Macau, South Korea, United States, China
- Camera setup: Multi camera
- Running time: 90 minutes
- Production companies: Liann Ye Production Co., Ltd. 聯意製作股份有限公司

Original release
- Network: TTV, TVBS
- Release: 16 October 2015 – 22 January 2016

Related
- Youth Power 哇！陳怡君; Shia Wa Se 幸福不二家

Taste of Love (Chinese: 唯一繼承者; pinyin: Wéi Yī Jì Chéng Zhě; literally "The Only Successor") is a 2015 Taiwanese romantic comedy television series produced by TVBS, starring Ray Chang, Vivian Sung, Hero Tai and Ching Yang as the main cast. Filming began in August, 2015 on location in Macau and will be filmed as it airs. First original broadcast began October 16, 2015 on TTV channel airing on Friday nights from 10:00-11:30 pm.

== Synopsis ==
Chris Man (Ray Chang), the younger heir to "Man Kee Restaurant", a Michelin star restaurant in Macau, lives an affluent selfish life. His family restaurant's most famous dish is the roast goose with special house sauce, which his mother is the only one that knows of the secret recipe. The restaurant finds itself in dire consequences when his mother collapses and goes into an coma. When the media reports about their mother's condition and that she is the only one that knows of the secret recipe this puts the restaurant's reputation and business in jeopardy. After only finding a postcard with a Taiwan address in the safe box where the recipe is supposedly kept, Chris heads to Taiwan hoping to find the origin of the secret recipe to save his family's restaurant.

In Taiwan, Ye Xiao He (Vivian Sung) is assigned to be his personal tour guide. She is a happy-go-lucky foodie who cares more about food then materialistic things. Their first meeting at the airport gets off on the wrong foot as she mistakes him to be a pervert when someone pushes him into her rear end. Further thinking he is still trying to harass her when he tries to tell her she is his tour guide she pepper sprays him. Once she finds out Chris is her VIP client she becomes apologetic as she is afraid to be written up again due to an earlier tour event where she wandered around by herself and lost track of time making her tour group wait for her.

Chris hands Xiao He an address and tells her to find the place. When they arrived they find out the address is an abandoned restaurant. With no other leads Xiao He asks her chef friend Chen Jun Hao (Hero Tai) if he has any information about the abandoned restaurant. One of Jun Hao's co-workers is only able to provide Chris with what he knows of the abandoned restaurant's chef reputation and his surname. With the little information they just received Chris proceeds on his journey, but before they can continue Xiao He reminds him that the day is almost over and he must pay for that day's services. Soon realizing he got pocketed of his identifications and wallet at the airport, he swallows his pride and unpleasant attitude to depend on Xiao He for food and broad that night when he backs out of contacting Charlie (Ching Yang), the only person he knows in Taiwan.

Xiao He brings Chris to her home and catches her live-in boyfriend naked with another woman. When Xiao He refuse to forgive her boyfriend's infidelity he becomes petty and kicks her out of their home because the deed is in his name and takes back all the gifts he ever gave her. With nowhere to go Xiao He goes back and brings Chris with her to her hometown village to stay at her family home. At Xiao He's home Chris encounters Xiao He's man hungry older sister and learns of Xiao He's estranged relationship with her mother. He also encounters Charlie who thinks he went to Taiwan to find her since the two had a past relationship, but he lies and tells Charlie that he and Xiao He are a couple.

== Cast ==
*Characters of Macau origin, names are listed in Cantonese then Mandarin pronunciations.

=== Main cast ===
- Ray Chang 張睿家 as Chris Man (文風; Cantonese: "Man Fung"; Mandarin: "Wen Feng")

2nd heir of the Man Kee Restaurant from Macau. He lives an affluent carefree life selfishly and has no plans to settle for anyone. While his mother and older brother run the kitchen of the restaurant he manages the front of the restaurant. When his mother collapses and is in a coma, he is forced to go to Taiwan to find the secret sauce recipe that is the main source of his family's restaurant success. Once in Taiwan Ye Xiao He is assigned as his personal tour guide, but he lets her know he is not in Taiwan to play but to find someone. After a few unfortunate events he and Xiao He's personal lives become more entangled with each other when she brings him to her hometown village. At the village he encounters his past girlfriend Charlie who wants to reconcile with him.

- Vivian Sung 宋芸樺 as Ye Xiao He (葉筱荷; nick named "Small Lotus Leaf 小荷葉")

A happy go luck tour guide who is also a foodie. After being written up by her tour group due to her losing track of time while sampling the foods in Macau she reassigned to domestic tours which leads her to be Chris's personal tour guide when he arrives in Taiwan. She initially assumes him to be a pervert and pepper sprays him due to an incident when picking him up at the airport but once all is clear up, afraid she will be written up again she becomes extra cordial to him. After Chris loses his wallet and seeing he knows no one and has nowhere to stay she helps him out by letting him stay at her home only to find out when they arrived that her boyfriend is cheating her. When her petty boyfriend kicks her out of their home she brings Chris with her to her hometown village.

- Hero Tai 戴祖雄 as Chen Jun Hao (沈君澔)

Ye Xiao He and Charlie's child friend who grew in the same village together with him. He has had a crush on Charlie all his life but can't find the courage to pursue her. He works as a chef in training which his mother is highly against as she sees it as a low pay and low title job and would rather have him working an office job. His father is the village chief who lead him to become a chef due to his love of cooking.

- Ching Yang 楊晴 as Charlie Xia (夏巧靈; Xia Qiao Ling)

Ye Xiao He and Chen Jun Hao's child friend that she grew up together with. She works as a variety cooking show producer. She is constantly faced with gossip and politics at work even though she works hard. Her previous boss, afraid she would take his job constantly put her down and let hear out her opinions at work. When he is fired and she takes on his position her co-workers gossips if she got the job because she is having an affair with the boss. During her university years in Hong Kong she had a relationship with Chris, but the two ended their relationship unhappily when she had to return to Taiwan. After seeing Chris again in Taiwan she desperately wants to reconcile with him even though he lies that her that he and Xiao He are together.

=== Man Kee Roast Goose Restaurant ===
- Edison Wang 王家梁 as Man Ye (文義; Mandarin: "Wen Yi")

Chris's older brother and Keung San May's oldest son. He works alongside his mother at the restaurant. While his brother is in Taiwan to find the secret sauce recipe he is left to hold down the fort at the restaurant. He is forced to see business and morale down at the restaurant. With his mother still in an coma the restaurant staff pushes him to name himself the new boss of the restaurant because he is considered nicer and harder worker then Chris.

- Li Zhi Qín 李之勤 as Keung San May (姜新美; Mandarin: Jiang Xin Mei")

The matriarch and head of the Man Kee restaurant empire. She built her restaurant empire with a secret sauce from a side walk stall in the streets of Hong Kong to a luxury three Michelin star restaurant that is frequented by VIP's around the world. Due to her being the only one that knows the recipe of the secret sauce the restaurant's business drastically drops when she is in an coma when no one knows how to reproduce the sauce.

=== Village residence ===
- Yin Zhao De 尹昭德 as Huang Shao Feng (黃少風)
- Bai Bai 百白 as Ruby (魯鼻; Lu bi)
- Hsiao Hou Tao 小戽斗 as A Tu Bo (阿土伯)
- Carol Cheng 鄭家榆 as Xia Jing Yi (夏靜怡)
- A Gil 阿嬌 as Auntie Xiang Xiang (香香姨)
- Wang Zi Qiang 王自強 as Village Chief (村長)

=== Extended cast ===
- Chien Te-men 乾德門
- Ti Chih Chieh 狄志杰
- William Liao 廖威廉
- DJ Swallow 妖嬌
- Peter Li 李銓
- Zhang Jin Hao 張晉豪
- Yi Lee 李易
- Yu Ni 余妮
- ID Yu 游艾迪

== Soundtrack ==
- Wind Blowing 風起 by Miu Chu 朱俐靜
- I'm Still Here 等一個人到老 by Ian Chen 陳彥允
- My Way by Miu Chu 朱俐靜
- Somewhere Without You 陌生的地方 by Ian Chen 陳彥允
- By My Side by Bii 畢書盡
- I Wanna Say by Bii 畢書盡
- The Way We Love 相愛的模樣 by Miu Chu 朱俐靜
- I Think I Can 以為我可以 by Miu Chu 朱俐靜

== Broadcast ==
Channel	Country	Airing Date	Timeslot
TTV HD	Taiwan	October 16, 2015	Friday 10:00-11:30 pm
TVBS	Taiwan	October 17, 2015	Saturday 10:00-11:30 pm
TVB8	Taiwan	October 25, 2015	Sunday 8:00-9:30 pm
Chinese Drama HD	Hong Kong	October 31, 2015	Saturday 1:00-2:30 pm
Jia Le Channel	Singapore	July 11, 2016	Monday to Friday 11:00 pm

== Episode ratings ==
Competing dramas on rival channels airing at the same time slot were:
- SET Taiwan - An Adopted Daughter
- FTV - Justice Heroes
- SETTV - Love Cuisine, Back to 1989

Air Date	Episode	Average Ratings	Rank
October 16, 2015	1	0.61	4
October 23, 2015	2	0.97	3
October 30, 2015	3	0.48	3
November 6, 2015	4	0.47	3
November 13, 2015	5	0.48	3
November 20, 2015	6	--	--
November 27, 2015	7	--	--
December 4, 2015	8	--	--
December 11, 2015	9	--	--
December 18, 2015	10	--	--
December 25, 2015	11	--	--
January 1, 2016	12	--	--
January 8, 2016	13	--	--
January 15, 2016	14	--	--
January 22, 2016	15	--	--
Average ratings		0.6	--
