= Love Cuisine =

- Promo poster
- 料理高校生
- Genre: Romance; Comedy
- Created by: Sanlih E-Television
- Written by: Lai Wan Rong 賴婉容
- Directed by: Xu Pei Shan 許珮珊
- Starring: Lego Lee; Allison Lin; Duncan Chow; Nita Lei
- Opening theme: "We Are Young 我們青春" by Dino Lee
- Ending theme: "Why Not Love? 怎麼還不愛" by Rosie Yang feat. Ryan Yu
- Country of origin: Taiwan
- Original languages: Mandarin; Hokkien; French; English
- No. of seasons: 1
- No. of episodes: 22 + 2

Production
- Executive producer: Xu Shu Fen 許淑芬
- Producers: Kuo Chien-Hung 郭建宏; Zhang Man Na 張曼娜; Yang Qi Xian 楊啟仙
- Production location: Taiwan
- Camera setup: Multi camera
- Running time: 90 minutes
- Production companies: TransWorld Production Co. Sanlih E-Television

Original release
- Network: SETTV; ETTV
- Release: 7 August 2015 – 1 January 2016

Related
- Murphy's Law of Love; Back to 1989

Love Cuisine (Chinese: 料理高校生; pinyin: liao li gao xiao sheng; literally "Cuisine High School Students") is a 2015 Taiwanese romance, comedy drama television series produced by Sanlih E-Television, starring Lego Lee, Allison Lin, Duncan Chow and Nita Lei as the main cast. Filming began on July 13, 2015 and the series was filmed as it aired. First original broadcast began August 7, 2015 on SETTV channel airing every Friday at 10:00-11:30 pm.

== Synopsis ==
Things get hot in the kitchen when Oscar Han (Lego Lee), a lively young chef, starts mixing up trouble under the nose of disciplined chef Fang Xiao Rou (Allison Lin). But as these complete opposites struggle to create mesmerizing meals, they eventually discover that cooking with gas requires more than technical skills and bravado. In fact, romance just may be the secret ingredient Oscar and Xiao Rou have been searching for all along.

== Cast ==
=== Main cast ===
- Lego Lee as Han Jie （Oscar Han）
- Allison Lin as Fang Xiao Rou
- Duncan Chow as Wen Zhen Yu
- Nita Lei as Jiang Pei Ying

=== Supporting cast ===
- Hank Wu as Su Ying Jun
- Calvin Lee as Li Zhi Chao
- Fu Lei as Han Jia Xiong
- Chu Lu-hao as Fang Ming Kai
- Sing Hong as Ma Chong Sheng (Ah Sheng)
- Ben Wu as Wang Mai Zhi (Mai Zi)
- Su Hsiao-hsuan as Liu Xuan
- Chen Jing Xuan as Fan Ai Mi （Amy）
- Zhang Luo Ti as Tang Hao (Tang Xiao Niu) student cook who plays the "tough guy" role
- Yi Guang as Kong Meng Zhe
- Huang Xin Hao as Li Ming Xiu
- Wu Ji Xuan as Fang Xiao Hua
- Qiao Ya Lin as Zhang Xuan Ya
- Lin Guan Ting as Qiang Na Sen
- Morning Chen as Chen Meng Chen
- Hung Yu-ching as Wei Qi Zhen

=== Cameo ===
- Qiu Long Jie as bar owner
- Hu Pei Lian as Xu Man Fen
- Lung Shao-hua as an old man
- Wang De Sheng as Old Chen
- Amanda Liu as nurse
- Wang Dao-nan as Boss Chen
- Tsai Ming Xiu as organic gardening radishes' owner
- Phoebe Huang as Hao Mei Li
- Paul Hsu as Raymond
- Lin Jia Wei as hotel's MC
- Guo Tai Wang as Hakka stir fry restaurant's chef
- Lia Lee as stir fry restaurant's wine promoter
- Lu Hsueh-feng as Chong Sheng's grandma
- Amanda Chou as Yao Xin Shi （Cindy Yao）
- Zhao Bai Han as elementary school student
- Zhang Yun Yun as MC
- Ji Tian Yu as MC
- Ba Zheng Kun as competition judges
- Pan Wei Xiang as competition judges
- Annie Duan as competition judges
- Zoe Li as Lin Hui Mei
- Guan Jin Zong as Boss Zhao
- Chris Wang as Chris Yao
- Wang Lei Zhen (Lei Lei)

== Soundtrack ==
- We Are Young 我們青春 by Dino Lee 李玉璽
- Why Not Love? 怎麼還不愛 by Rosie Yang 楊凱琳 & Ryan Yu 余楓
- SHOUT by Dino Lee 李玉璽
- For You by Dino Lee 李玉璽
- Love More by Bii 畢書盡
- Stay 我不離開 by Princess Ai 戴愛玲 & A-Lin
- Never Forget 不忘 by Rosie Yang 楊凱琳
- You've Been In My Heart 你一直在心中 by Wu Mochou 吳莫愁

== Broadcast ==
| Network | Country | Airing Date | Timeslot |
|---|---|---|---|
| SETTV | Taiwan | August 7, 2015 | Friday 10:00-11:30 pm |
| ETTV | Taiwan | August 8, 2015 (until October 31, 2015) | Saturday 10:00-11:30 pm |
| ETTV | Taiwan | November 7, 2015 | Saturday 8:30-10:00 pm |
| CTS | Taiwan | May 11, 2017 | Monday to Friday 9:00-10:30 pm |
| Astro Shuang Xing | Malaysia | August 7, 2015 | Friday 10:00-11:30 pm |
| E City | Singapore | August 30, 2015 | Sunday 10:00-11:30 pm |
| UNTV | Philippines | This 2021 | TBA |

== Episode ratings ==
Competing dramas on rival channels airing at the same time slot were:
- SET Taiwan - An Adopted Daughter
- FTV - Justice Heroes
- TTV - Youth Power, Taste of Love
- CTV - Doctor Stranger

| Air Date | Episode | Average Ratings | Rank |
|---|---|---|---|
| Aug 7, 2015 | 1 | 1.92 | 1 |
| Aug 14, 2015 | 2 | 1.93 | 1 |
| Aug 21, 2015 | 3 | 2.12 | 1 |
| Aug 28, 2015 | 4 | 2.19 | 1 |
| Sep 4, 2015 | 5 | 1.59 | 1 |
| Sep 11, 2015 | 6 | 1.94 | 1 |
| Sep 18, 2015 | 7 | 1.79 | 1 |
| Sep 25, 2015 | 8 | 1.89 | 1 |
| Oct 2, 2015 | 9 | 2.01 | 1 |
| Oct 9, 2015 | 10 | 2.03 | 1 |
| Oct 16, 2015 | 11 | 2.20 | 1 |
| Oct 23, 2015 | 12 | 2.14 | 1 |
| Oct 30, 2015 | 13 | 2.16 | 1 |
| Nov 6, 2015 | 14 | 2.27 | 1 |
| Nov 13, 2015 | 15 | 2.13 | 1 |
| Nov 20, 2015 | 16 | 2.10 | 1 |
| Nov 27, 2015 | 17 | 1.93 | 1 |
| Dec 4, 2015 | 18 | 1.96 | 1 |
| Dec 11, 2015 | 19 | 2.09 | 1 |
| Dec 18, 2015 | 20 | 2.12 | 1 |
| Dec 25, 2015 | 21 | 1.96 | 1 |
| Jan 1, 2016 | 22 | 2.01 | 1 |
| Jan 8, 2016 | Special Eps 1 | 1.22 | 2 |
| Jan 15, 2016 | Special Eps 2 | -- | -- |
| Average ratings | | 2.02 | -- |

== Awards and nominations ==
| Year | Ceremony | Category | Nominee | Result |
|---|---|---|---|---|
| 2015 | 2015 Sanlih Drama Awards | Best Actor Award | Lego Lee | Won |
| 2015 | 2015 Sanlih Drama Awards | Best Actress Award | Allison Lin | Nominated |
| 2015 | 2015 Sanlih Drama Awards | Best Screen Couple Award | Lego Lee and Allison Lin | Nominated |
| 2015 | 2015 Sanlih Drama Awards | Best Kiss Award | Lego Lee and Allison Lin | Nominated |
| 2015 | 2015 Sanlih Drama Awards | Best Green Leaf Award | Nita Lei | Nominated |
| 2015 | 2015 Sanlih Drama Awards | Best Potential Award | Ben Wu | Won |
| 2015 | 2015 Sanlih Drama Awards | Best Potential Award | Sing Hong | Won |
| 2015 | 2015 Sanlih Drama Awards | Best Potential Award | Xiao Xuan Su | Won |
| 2015 | 2015 Sanlih Drama Awards | Best Selling S-Pop Magazine Award | Lego Lee | Won |
| 2015 | 2015 Sanlih Drama Awards | Best Selling S-Pop Magazine Award | Allison Lin | Nominated |
| 2015 | 2015 Sanlih Drama Awards | Viewers Choice Drama Award | Love Cuisine | Nominated |
| 2016 | 51st Golden Bell Awards | Best Newcomer in a Television Series | Ben Wu | Nominated |
