= Bai Bai =

Taiwanese actress (born 1988)

- 百白
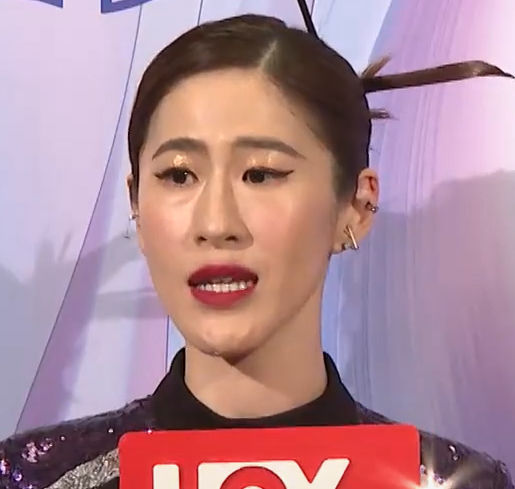
- Bai in July 2023
- Born: Pai Ching-I; 10 August 1988 (age 37); Taiwan
- Education: National Taiwan University of Arts (BA)
- Occupation: Actress
- Years active: 2014–present

Pai Ching-I (Chinese: 白靜宜; born 10 August 1988), also known by her stage name Bai Bai (百白), is a Taiwanese actress best known for her role as Pretty in the horror comedy film Treat or Trick (2021), which earned her Best Supporting Actress in the 23rd Taipei Film Awards.

== Early life ==
Bai was born on 10 August 1988. Her father was a triad member, and she moved her home about twenty times during her childhood to evade his enemies. She attended the National Taiwan University of Arts, where she graduated with a Bachelor of Arts in drama. After graduation, she briefly worked as a substitute teacher before becoming an acting coach at the age of 22. She taught Kent Tsai and Edward Chen, and served as the on-set coach for the 2015 romance film Our Times. Due to a lack of students, Bai intended to end her coaching career and pursue work in a restaurant. However, her father encouraged her to follow her acting dreams, leading her to debut onscreen.

== Career ==
Bai began her career as a character actor and her early roles include appearances in the 2015 television series To the Dearest Intruder and Taste of Love. She landed main roles in the 2016 drama series Smile is a Best Medicine and the 2018 thriller series Nana's Game, as well as starring in the 2018 comedy horror film Secrets in The Hot Spring.

In 2021, Bai received her breakout role as Pretty in the horror-comedy film Treat or Trick, which earned her Best Supporting Actress in the 23rd Taipei Film Awards. She also starred in the supernatural comedy series Sometimes When We Touch in the same year. In 2022, Bai both acted in and served as the acting coach for the drama films Little Blue and I've Walked Through The Love's Wilderness. She is set to appear in a lead role as Camilla in the 2024 horror-comedy film Dead Talents Society.

== Filmography ==
=== Films ===
Year	Title	Role	Notes/Ref.
2014	Café. Waiting. Love	Bookclub member	
2016	My Egg Boy	Lin's colleague	
2017	The Village of No Return	Villager	
2018	Secrets in The Hot Spring	The Bat (蝙蝠)	
2020	Sent From Above	Fan's henchwoman	
2021	Treat or Trick	Pretty (美女)	
2022	Little Blue	Teacher	Cameo
2022	Girls, Be Ambitious!	Kiang-kiang (強強)	
2023	Miss Shampoo	Guan (阿娟)	
2023	Hello Ghost	Master Fafa (發發大師)	
2024	Dead Talents Society	Camilla (卡蜜拉)	

=== Television ===
Year	Title	Role	Notes/Ref.
2015	To the Dearest Intruder	Dou Ying-jun (都英俊)	Recurring role
2015	Taste of Love	Ruby (魯鼻)	Recurring role
2016	Smile is a Best Medicine	Si-yu (思妤)	Main role
2018	Nana's Game	Liu (小劉)	Main role
2021	Sometimes When We Touch	Chen Jing-fang (陳靜芳)	Main role
2022	I've Walked Through The Love's Wilderness	Liu Cai-lin (劉彩琳)	Main role
2023	Island Nation: Hoping	Liu Hsin-yi (劉欣儀)	Recurring role (season SP)
2024	My Unexpected Roommate	Hsieh Mei-hung (謝美虹)	Main role

== Awards and nominations ==
Year	Award	Category	Work	Result	Ref.
2021	23rd Taipei Film Awards	Best Supporting Actress	Treat or Trick	Won	
