= TVBS Entertainment Channel =

- Country: Taiwan
- Broadcast area: Taiwan
- Network: TVBS
- Headquarters: Taiwan

Ownership
- Owner: TVBS Media
- Sister channels: TVBS News, TVBS, TVBS Asia

History
- Launched: 12 September 1994; 31 years ago
- Former names: TVBS-G

Links
- Website: TVBS Joy Channel

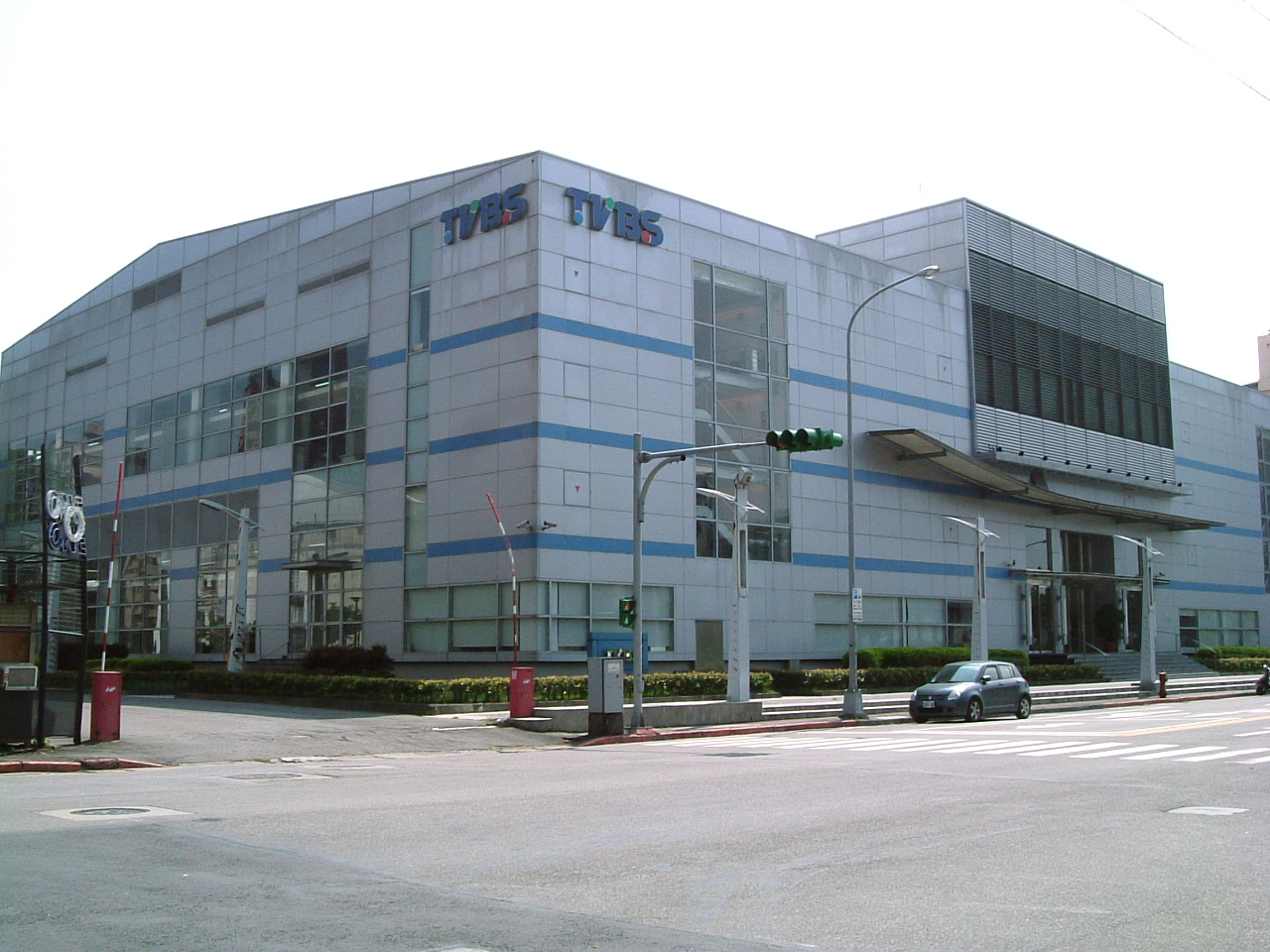
TVBS-G produces programs mainly from their Nangang building in Taipei City.

TVBS Entertainment Channel (formerly TVBS-G) is a satellite television channel in Taiwan, launched on 12 September 1994.

TVBS Entertainment Channel rebroadcasts Hong Kong dramas from TVB, yet also produces its own dramas since 2003.

== Programs ==
=== Dramas ===
First run date	English name	Original name in Traditional Chinese	Notes
2003-08-26	Seventh Grade	七年級生	
2004-06-29	Love Contract	愛情合約	
2004-08-17	Love Herb	香草戀人館	
2005-09-26	Express Boy	惡男宅急電	
2005-11-10		8星報喜	
2006-07-29	Merry Me	我們結婚吧	it also aired on CTS since 19 July 2006, 10 days earlier than TVBS-G
2008-12-27	I Do?	幸福的抉擇	
2010-06-05	Scent of Love	就是要香戀	it also aired on CTV since May 30, 2010
2013-07-27	Dragon Gate	飛越·龍門客棧	This is TVBS return to production drama
2013-11-16	Kiss Me Mom!	媽，親一下！	
2014-03-22	Rock N' Road	A咖的路	
2014-07-19	The Way We Were	16個夏天	
2014-12-06	Boysitter	俏摩女搶頭婚	
2015-05-02	Youth Power	哇！陳怡君	
2015-10-17	Taste of Love	唯一繼承者	
2016-05-07	Life List	遺憾拼圖	

== See also ==
- TVB
