= Mariko Okubo =

Japanese actress

- 大久保 麻梨子
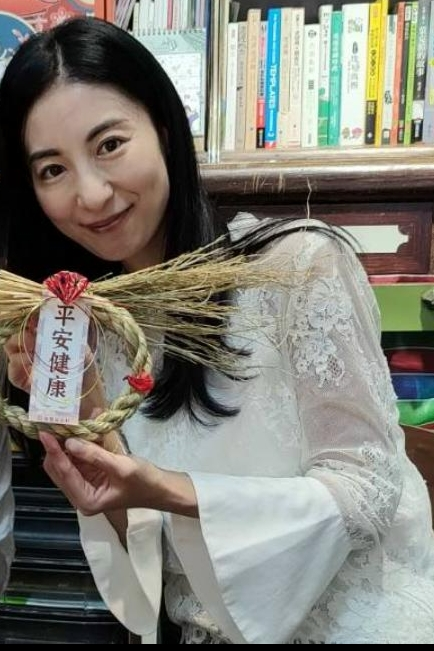
- Okubo in 2023
- Born: September 7, 1984 (age 41); Sasebo, Nagasaki, Japan
- Occupation: Actress
- Years active: 2003–present
- Height: 1.63 m (5 ft 4 in)

Mariko Okubo (大久保 麻梨子, Ōkubo Mariko; born September 7, 1984) is a Japanese model and actress based in Taiwan.

== Early life ==
Okubo was born in Sasebo, Nagasaki, Japan, on September 7, 1984.

== Career ==
Okubo debuted as a gravure idol in 2003. She later started a career in acting, moving to Taiwan in 2011.

In 2013, she won the Golden Bell Awards for Best Supporting Actress in Taiwan.

== Filmography ==
=== Film ===
- SS (2008)
- La Lingerie (2015)
- The Bold, the Corrupt, and the Beautiful (2017)
- A Sower of Seeds 4 (2021)

=== Television ===
- Toritsu Mizusho! (2006, NTV), Naomi
- Juken Sentai Gekiranger (2007, TV Asahi)
- GodHand Teru (2009, TBS), Kaori Hasegawa
- Orthros no Inu (2009, TBS)
- Substitute for Love (2012, PTS)
- Shia Wa Se (2015, TTV)
