= Eye Central Television =

Taiwanese internet news channel

- Country: Republic of China

Programming
- Language(s): Taiwanese Mandarin, Taiwanese Hokkien

Ownership
- Owner: Chang Chang Creative

History
- Launched: 5 August 2015 (9 years, 217 days)

Links
- Website: cccreative.tv eyectv.soci.vip YouTube channel

Eye Central Television (Chinese: 眼球中央電視台; pinyin: Yǎnqiú Zhōngyāng Diànshìtái; Zhuyin Fuhao: ㄧㄢˇ ㄑㄧㄡˊ ㄓㄨㄥ ㄧㄤ ㄉㄧㄢˋ ㄕˋ ㄊㄞˊ), or EYECTV, is a Taiwanese internet news channel which focuses on political satire. Hosted by "Retina" (Chen Tzu-chien) with YouTube as its platform, its main video content is the Central Television in One Minute series, a parodic news channel claiming to be "state media of the Republic of China" that satirises China Central Television (CCTV) news reports. The media's content portrays Chinese nationalism and conservatism in a satirical tone and mainly touches on Cross-Strait politics and public affairs.

EYECTV discontinued regular programming on 1 June 2023.

== Purpose of founding ==
The purpose of EYECTV is to portray as irony, parts of the Constitution of the Republic of China (ROC), including the territorial scope covered in the Constitution. It seeks to highlight the "absurdity" of Constitution as well as concepts like "Three Principles of the People Unites China" and "saving the compatriots in the enemy-occupied area" which were propagated during Taiwan's martial law by the ruling Kuomintang.

== Production team ==
=== Origins ===
Curious about Mainland China's political strategies, EYECTV anchor "Retina" (Chen Tzu-chien) attended an undergraduate journalist contest held in Quanzhou, Fujian, Mainland China in 2015. He saw CCTV's Xinwen Lianbo news programme and started to privately imitate CCTV anchors' singing of praises to leaders of the Chinese Communist Party (CCP), as he found them funny.

Producer "Oculomotor Nerve" (Ho Shan-jung) met "Retina" at the contest. The contestants communicated in WeChat groups. One day, Ho Shan-jung accessed WeChat after a day of not using the Internet and saw hundreds of messages. She asked if any group member was willing to arrange the chat contents. Chen Tzu-Chien volunteered by imitating CCTV news anchors.

During the event, Mainland China officials gathered the students for meals every day, and the song Both sides of the Taiwan Strait are a family (兩岸一家親) were sung before that. This made Taiwanese students uncomfortable. They discussed producing similar online news programmes to counter Mainland China's political strategies, and it became the Eye Central Television as Chen Tzu-chien previously suffered from eye diseases.

=== Formation ===
At the initial stage, the team included Taiwanese and Mainland Chinese people and were 24 years old on average. Some members had never met and they held discussions and completed tasks on the Internet. On 3 September 2017, Retina told the Liberty Times in an exclusive interview that the team had then consisted of four people as his friends gradually graduated or become employed.

The current production team as displayed on YouTube consists of anchor "Retina", producer "Oculomotor Nerve", film director "Lying Silkworm", PR manager "Iris" and animation "Pupil". Milla, a second anchor, joined the team in late 2019.

=== Planning ===
Producer "Oculomotor Nerve" and anchor "Retina" pointed out that by proclaiming to be the "state media of China" and using terms like "Mainland occupied area, Hong Kong special occupied area and Taiwan free area of the Republic of China", it highlights the absurdity of the Constitution of the ROC that is in force.

The team wishes Taiwanese people to re-discuss what the ROC is, and spark the viewers' interest in politics and social affairs. They wish to target young people aged 35 and below, as "they may have a confused identity or are shaping their identity. Their national identity isn't deeply entrenched yet, and can be reconstructed through various discussions."

== Reporting style ==
The contents of EYECTV programmes involve satirical political correctness and self-censorship, for example:

- President of ROC Tsai Ing-wen is referred to as "President of China", and Kaohsiung is called "Kaohsiung, China".
- The ROC is proclaimed to be the "sole legitimate China", and the map of ROC (consisting of Taiwan, Mainland China and Mongolia) published by the ROC Government until 2005 is used.
- General Secretary of the Chinese Communist Party (CCP) Xi Jinping is referred to as "bandit chief Winnie the Xi".
- The Kuomintang is referred to as the Kuo-yu Party.
- CTI News Network is referred to as "Hantian News" (Han Kuo-yu Daily News)
- The Chinese Communist Party is referred to as Red bandit or Communist bandit, Mainland China is called as "Mainland Hard-Hit Occupied Area", and Hong Kong Special Administrative Region is called "Hong Kong Special Occupied Region".

Other names are used, often from jokes made on special programmes, such as:

- Miaoli County is referred to as the Miaoli Nation.
- President of ROC Tsai Ing-wen is referred to as "Xiang Tsai Ing-wen" (Coriander Ing-wen).
- Retina's dog, Youzi, an Shiba Inu is referred to as "Godly Beast Youzi"

== Programmes ==
=== Regular programmes ===
- EYECTV Xinwen Lianbo 央視新聞聯播
  - This is the flagship news programme of EYECTV, airing with two hosts and an extended format.
- EYECTV In One Minute 央視一分鐘
  - This is the original and most frequent EYECTV programme, with one host summarising a few days of news in around ten minutes.
- EYECTV On the Ground 央視走基層
- EYECTV Guest Hall 央視會客廳
- EYECTV Eating with Retina 央視膜飯食刻
- EYECTV Nothing to Say 央視無話可説
- EYECTV Fight For The Wind
- Obnoxious Viewer Reactions 刁民大攔轎
- Monday On-Site 星期一現場

=== Special programmes ===
- Central Television New Year's Gala
  - This programme is the most watched of all EYECTV programmes, being held from 2017 (106) to 2020 (109), and 2023 (112). Due to the COVID-19 pandemic, it was replaced with a special New Year's programme in 2021 (110) and 2022 (111).
  - This programme is intended to satirise the CCTV New Year's Gala, with similar chunlian and using Mainland accented Mandarin.
  - The event typically features various celebrities, famous singers (such as Fire EX.), and politicians.
- EYECTV Celebrates Double Tenth
  - This programme celebrates the National Day of the Republic of China, being held in 2017 (106) and 2018 (107). Due to the COVID-19 pandemic, it was replaced with a Xinwen Lianbo special programme from 2019 (108) to 2022 (111).
  - During the programme, hosts typically highlight the fall of Mainland China and satirise ROC nationalists, bowing to portraits of Sun Yat-Sen and singing patriotic songs.
  - Various politicians have participated, such as Kao Chia-yu and Su Tseng-chang.
- Ballot Box: Watch EYECTV, 2020 (109)
  - This programme comedically covered the 15th Presidential Election of the Republic of China, highlighting fake news such as the claim that "children would be taught anal coitus in elementary school if the DPP is elected".
- Save the World: Recall Ballot of Han Kuo-yu, 2020 (109)
- Funeral for CTI News, 2020 (109)
- 9+1 Election NOW, 2022 (111)

== Impact ==
On 5 January 2016, the Green Party–Social Democratic Party alliance held a press conference and played EYECTV's video that mocked President Ma Ying-jeou's policy for young people.
