= Monica Yin =

Taiwanese actress

Monica Yin 殷琦
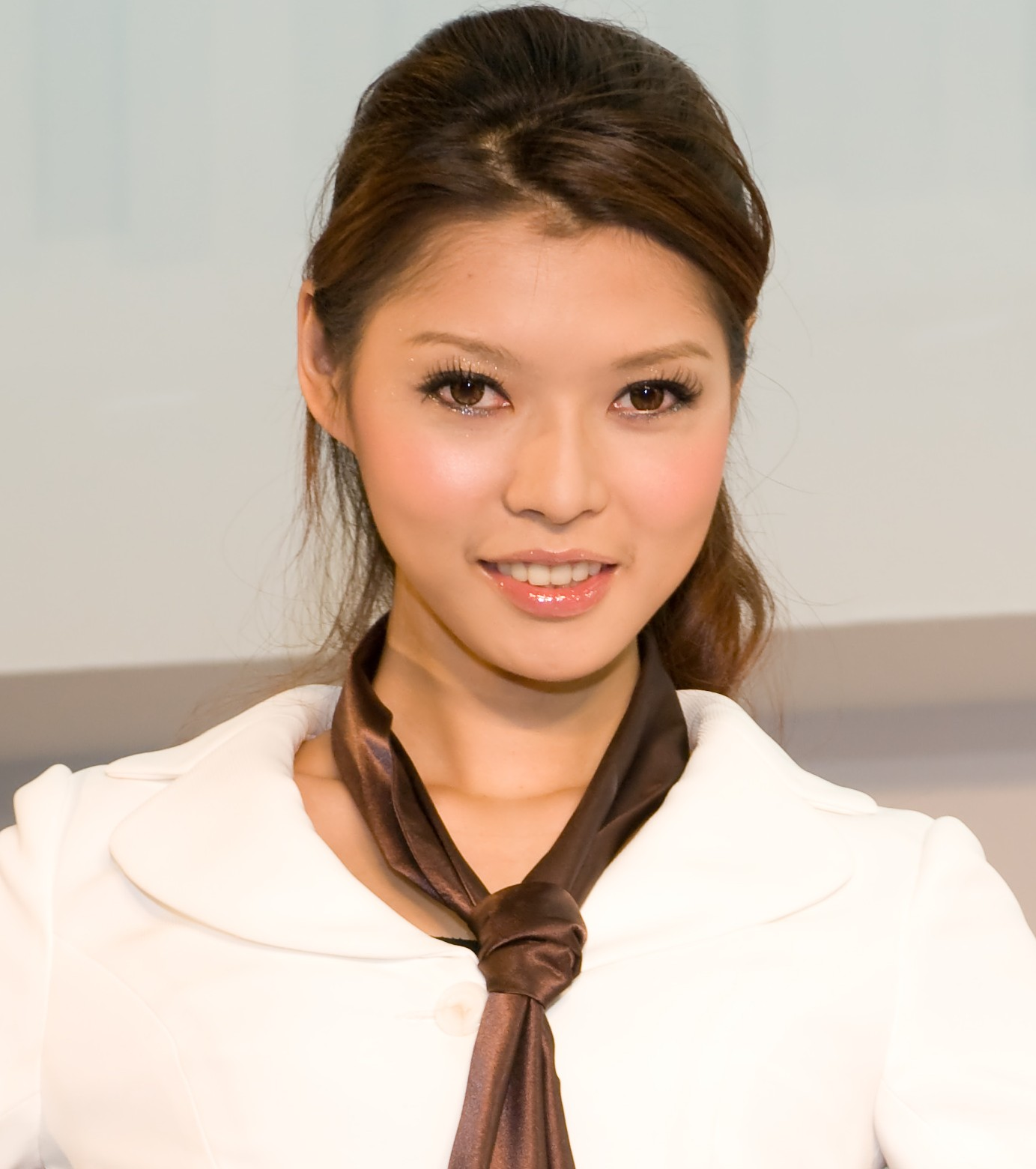
- Yin in 2008
- Born: 2 December 1977 (age 48); Taiwan
- Occupations: Model; actress

Monica Yin (Chinese: 殷琦; pinyin: Yīn Qí; born 2 December 1977) is a Taiwanese actress.

== Filmography ==
=== Television series ===
Year	English title	Original title	Role	Notes
2011	In Time with You	我可能不會愛你	Cheng Mei Qing	
2013	Happy 300 Days	遇見幸福300天	Ah Jiao	
