= TVBS =

- Country: Taiwan
- Broadcast area: Taiwan; United States; Worldwide (via internet)
- Headquarters: Taipei

Ownership
- Owner: TVBS Media
- Sister channels: TVBS Entertainment Channel, TVBS News, TVBS Asia

History
- Launched: September 28, 1993; 33 years ago

Links
- Website: www.tvbs.com.tw

Availability

Streaming media
- Sling TV: Internet Protocol television

TVBS Media Inc.
- Traditional Chinese: 聯利媒體股份有限公司
Transcriptions
Standard Mandarin
- Hanyu Pinyin: Lián Lì Méi Tǐ Gǔ Fèn Yǒu Xiàn Gōng Sī
Southern Min
- Hokkien POJ: Liân-lī Mûi-thé Kó͘-hūn Iú-hān Kong-si
- Tâi-lô: Liân-lī Mûi-thé Kó͘-hūn Iú-hān Kong-si

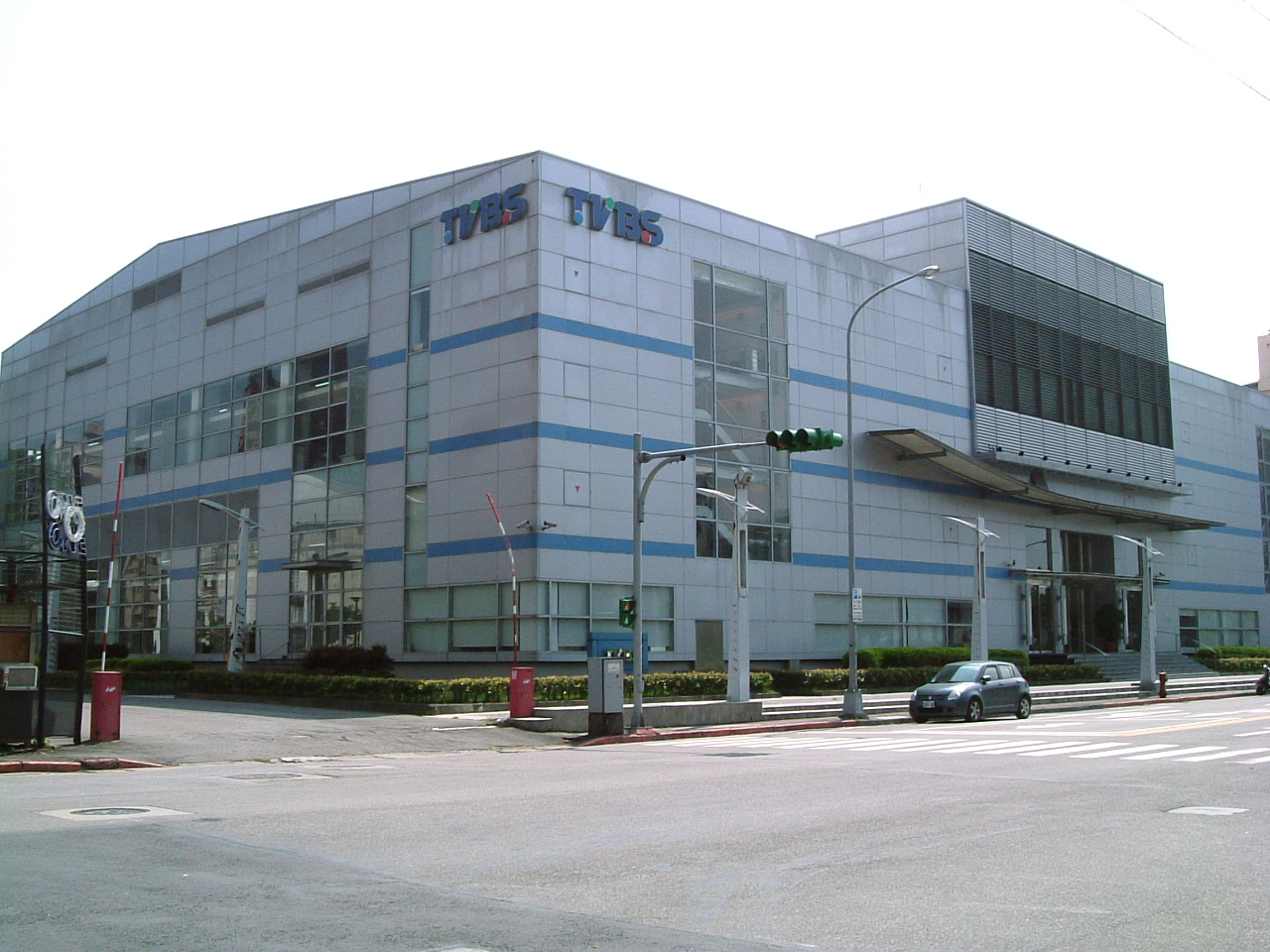
TVBS Nangang building in Taipei City

TVBS Media Inc. (Chinese: 聯利媒體股份有限公司), formerly Liann Yee Production Co., Ltd. (Chinese: 聯意製作股份有限公司; pinyin: Lián Yì Zhì Zuò Gǔ Fèn Yǒu Xiàn Gōng Sī; Pe̍h-ōe-jī: Liân-ì Chè-chok Kó͘-hūn Iú-hān Kong-si) is a Taiwanese commercial television broadcasting company. It was originally established as a joint venture between the Hong Kong television network TVB and the Taiwanese network Era Group, but TVB took over Era's shares in the company in 2005. Later, TVB sold all of its shares in the company to HTC Corporation Chairwoman Cher Wang.

As of 2019, TVBS operates four domestic channels and one international channel: TVBS, the flagship channel; TVBS News, 24-hour news channel; TVBS Entertainment, which shows variety and drama series; TVBS E! (formerly TVB8), an alternative channel available on CHT MOD IPTV platform; and TVBS Asia, available outside Taiwan.

== History ==
The company's flagship channel, TVBS, began its broadcast through satellite DTH and local cable systems on 28 September 1993. The name originally stood for "TVB Superchannel", while its Chinese name was Wuhsien Weihsing Tienshiht'ai (Chinese: 無線衛星電視台; pinyin: Wúxiàn Wèixīng Diànshìtái). It was originally a part of the so-called "Gang of Five", which was a consortium that was set up to compete against Star TV across Asia. (The others in the group were CNN International, HBO, ESPN International [with its Asian operations] and the Australian Broadcasting Corporation [with Australia Television International]) The consortium's channels were initially transmitted via Palapa satellite, but were later also added to Apstar satellite. TVBS later launched an international version named TVBS Asia in 1997, and TVB launched separate satellite channels that targeted East and Southeast Asia in 1998.

As the first privately owned broadcaster, it broke the decades-long oligopoly of the three state-owned terrestrial television stations in the Taiwan market.

TVBS Media was the first Taiwanese broadcasting company to go full HD, from filming to production to broadcast. It was the first to introduce 4K cameras paired with movie-quality lenses to film and produce its dramas, programs, and news special reports.

== TVBS channels ==
TVBS operates four channels:

- TVBS
- TVBS Entertainment Channel
- TVBS News
- TVBS-Asia
- TVBS E!

== Controversy ==
- Government Information Office (GIO) Taiwan head Pasuya Yao claims TVBS violated Taiwan media ownership laws, requiring that a foreign juristic person should not directly own majority shares of local satellite channels. On 1 November 2005, the announced a fine of NT$1 million against TVBS and ordered that it comply with the ownership rules in a practical timeframe, and afterwards TVBS appealed to Executive Yuan against Yao's decision. TVBS stated that TVB, a television broadcasting company in Hong Kong, held majority ownership of the company by a local juristic person. Executive Yuan announced that TVBS's ownership models is legal and GIO are required to return the fine.
- Bitumen duck incident (瀝青鴨事件): happened on 29 December 2006. Although TVBS apologized, the incident had already caused damage to the duck farming industry.
- Chou Cheng-pao Video Tape incident (周政保影帶事件): happened on 26 March 2007. On March 30, the NCC fined TVBS a total of two million New Taiwan dollars and required TVBS to replace the general manager.

== See also ==
- List of Taiwan companies
- List of Hong Kong companies
- Taiwan Major League
- TVB
- TVB News
- HKTV
- List of Taiwanese television series
