= Back to 1989 =

- Promotional poster
- 1989一念間
- Genre: Fantasy; Romance; Comedy; Financial thriller
- Written by: Yeh Feng-Ying(Screenwriter coordinator, ep 10-21); Chen Han Xuan (ep 1); Du Xin Yi (ep 1-2); Dai Jia Hong (ep 1); Huang Ya Qin (ep 1); Lin Wan Qi (ep 1); Liu Rui Xuan (ep 2-11); Ke Zun Ren (ep 3-5); Lan Meng He (ep 3-5); Lin Ya Chun (ep 4-11); Luo Qian Ni (ep 6-21); Li Song Lin (ep 6-21); Zhang Ya Jun (ep 10-21)
- Directed by: Ker Choon Hooi
- Starring: Marcus Chang; Ivy Shao; Mini Tsai; Yorke Sun; Ray Yang; Chang Chieh
- Opening theme: "A Friend" (我們是朋友) by Gary Chaw
- Ending theme: "Two People" (兩個人) by Alien Huang
- Country of origin: Taiwan
- Original languages: Mandarin; Taiwanese Hokkien
- No. of seasons: 1
- No. of episodes: 21 + 1

Production
- Producer: Chen Hui Ying
- Production location: Taiwan
- Running time: 90 minutes
- Production companies: Sanlih E-Television; I Production Co. Ltd.

Original release
- Network: SET Metro; EBC Variety
- Release: 22 January – 1 July 2016

Back to 1989 (Chinese: 1989一念間; pinyin: yī jiǔ bā jiǔ yī niàn jiān) is a 2016 Taiwanese fantasy, romance, comedy television series produced by Sanlih E-Television. It is adaptation from Huang Xin Jie's (一念間) who won the 6th Television Scriptwriting Award for creative popularity award held by Bureau of Audiovisual and Music Industry Development. It stars Marcus Chang, Ivy Shao, Mini Tsai, Yorke Sun, Ray Yang and Chang Chieh. Filming began on December 28, 2015, and wrapped up on May 30, 2016. First original broadcast began on January 22, 2016, on SET Metro airing every Friday night at 10:00-11:30 pm.

== Synopsis ==
Chen Che doesn't know who his father was and the topic is a taboo in the Chen family. When an accident threw him back to 1989, a year before he was born, he gets a chance to find out himself. Before he could locate his mother, he first meets her best friend, Ye Zhen Zhen, a wholesome girl who helps him navigate the past while he helps her land big clients with his expert knowledge of stock market trend. Through her, he gets to know his younger, happier "mom" and the possible candidates for his father. He soon learns the reason his mother never talks about his father, and he is faced with a dilemma: He must choose between his mother's future and his very existence.

== Cast ==
=== Main cast ===
- Marcus Chang as Chen Che
  - Liao Bai Xun as Chen Che (3 years old)
  - Ceng Bai Wai as Chen Che (7 years old)
- Ivy Shao as Ye Zhen Zhen
- Mini Tsai as Chen Ya Juan
- Yorke Sun as Li Jin Qin
- Ray Yang as Lin Xiao Long
- Chang Chieh (actor) as Wang Zhong En

=== Supporting cast ===
- Josie Leung as Zhang Wan Ling
- Yin Chao-te as Chen Guo Zhang
- Gail Lin as Huang Bao Yu
- Chien Chang as Ye Qing Xiong
- Jacko Chiang as Jian Zhen Hua
- Tina Chou as Hu Li Jing
- Liu Jin Wei as Ye Guo An
  - Kerr Hsu as adult Guo An
- Kuo Hsuan-chi as Zhao Zhi Cheng
- Guo Pei Yu as Ah Wei
- Xu Shao Fen as Xiao Qian
- Wang Yue-feng as Guo Sheng Tai

=== Cameos ===
- Lu Fu Ling as Wu Xiao Li （Lily Wu）
- Bamboo Chen as General Manager Tian
- Jian Yi Zhe as Li Da Zhong
- Chen Bor-jeng as President Wang
- Xia Yi Li as Chief Editor Zhang
- Lin Shi En as Zhang Shun Fa
- Lai Meng Jun as Liu Shu Hui
- Xie Fei as Shun Fa and Shu Hui's son
- Lan Jing Heng as David
- Roger Wang as Jin Qin's father
- Tong Yi Jun as psychic

== Soundtrack ==
Back to 1989 Original TV Soundtrack (OST)

Soundtrack album by Various artists
- Released: 22 January 2016
- Genre: Mandopop
- Language: Mandarin
- Label: Rock Records

Back to 1989 Original TV Soundtrack (OST) (1989一念間 電視原聲帶) was released on January 22, 2016, by various artists under Rock Records. It contains 12 tracks total, in which 6 songs are various instrumental versions of the songs. The opening theme "A Friend 我們是朋友" by Gary Chaw 曹格 is not featured on the official soundtrack CD. The closing theme is track 1 "Two People 兩個人" by Alien Huang 黃鴻升.

=== Track listing ===
No.	Title	Singer(s)	Length
1.	"Two People" (兩個人)	Alien Huang 黃鴻升	4:15
2.	"Only These Words Tonight" (今晚，只是有些話（愛人不回版）)	Nine Chen 陳零九 feat. Shi Shi 孫盛希	3:55
3.	"You Him Me" (你他我)	Nine Chen 陳零九	5:08
4.	"Dream To Awakening" (夢醒時分)	Sarah Chen 陳淑樺	4:04
5.	"The Last Gentleness" (最後一次溫柔)	Bobby Chen 陳昇	4:54
6.	"What Reason Does Love Have?" (愛情有什麼道理)	Sylvia Chang 張艾嘉	3:48
7.	"Only These Words Tonight (Instrumental ver.)" (今晚只是有些話(愛人不回版) - 配樂)	Chen Qi Tian 陳啟天	2:37
8.	"Two People (Instrumental ver.)" (兩個人 - 配樂)	Chen Qi Tian 陳啟天	2:52
9.	"You Him Me (Instrumental ver.)" (你他我 - 配樂)	Chen Qi Tian 陳啟天	3:07
10.	"Dream to Awakening (Kala ver.)" (夢醒時分 - KALA)	Instrumental	4:04
11.	"The Last Gentleness (Kala ver.)" (最後一次溫柔 - KALA)	Instrumental	4:38
12.	"What Reason Does Love Have? (Kala ver.)" (愛情有什麼道理 - KALA)	Instrumental	3:48

Songs not featured on the official soundtrack album.

- A Friend 我們是朋友 by Gary Chaw 曹格
- Little 小小 by Gary Chaw 曹格
- Life Is Beautiful 美麗人生 by Gary Chaw 曹格
- I'm From A Star 我來自那顆星 by Alien Huang 黃鴻升
- Fell In Love With You 愛上你 by Wendy Chen
- Moving On 單身≠失戀 by Shi Shi 孫盛希

== Broadcast ==
Network	Country	Airing Date	Timeslot
SET Metro	Taiwan	January 22, 2016	Friday 10:00-11:30 pm
EBC Variety	Taiwan	January 23 - February 20, 2016	Saturday 8:30-10:00 pm
EBC Variety	Taiwan	February 27, 2016	Saturday 10:00-11:30 pm
CTS	Taiwan	April 12, 2017	Monday to Friday 9:00-10:30 pm
Astro Shuang Xing	Malaysia	January 22, 2016	Friday 10:00-11:30 pm
E City	Singapore	February 14, 2016	Sunday 10:00-11:30 pm
VTV2	Vietnam	May 10 - June 12, 2020	Every day 19:00-19:45

== Episode ratings ==
Competing dramas on rival channels airing at the same time slot were:

- FTV - Justice Heroes, My Teacher Is Xiao-he
- STAR Chinese Channel - Golden Darling
- SET Taiwan - La Grande Chaumiere Violette
- TTV - Shia Wa Se, Life List

Air Date	Episode	Average Ratings	Rank
Jan 22, 2016	1	1.19	1
Jan 29, 2016	2	1.11	2
February 5, 2016 and February 12, 2016: Rerun of episode 1-2 due to Chinese New Year holidays
Feb 19, 2016	3	1.48	1
Feb 26, 2016	4	1.69	1
Mar 4, 2016	5	1.69	1
Mar 11, 2016	6	1.74	1
Mar 18, 2016	7	1.52	1
Mar 25, 2016	8	1.92	1
Apr 1, 2016	9	1.52	1
Apr 8, 2016	10	1.54	1
Apr 15, 2016	11	1.71	2
Apr 22, 2016	12	1.91	1
Apr 29, 2016	13	1.82	1
May 6, 2016	14	2.16	1
May 13, 2016	15	1.98	1
May 20, 2016	16	2.11	1
May 27, 2016	17	2.38	1
Jun 3, 2016	18	1.90	1
Jun 10, 2016	19	2.08	1
Jun 17, 2016	20	2.34	1
Jun 24, 2016	21	3.03	1
Jul 1, 2016	Special Episode	1.07	
Average ratings		1.83^{1}	--

^Note 1: The average rating calculation does not include special episode.

== Awards and nominations ==
Year	Ceremony	Category	Nominee	Result
2016	2016 Sanlih Drama Awards	Viewers Choice Drama Award	Back to 1989	Won
2016	2016 Sanlih Drama Awards	Best Actor Award	Marcus Chang	Nominated
2016	2016 Sanlih Drama Awards	Best Actress Award	Ivy Shao	Nominated
2016	2016 Sanlih Drama Awards	Best Actress Award	Mini Tsai	Won
2016	2016 Sanlih Drama Awards	Best Potential Award	Marcus Chang	Won
2016	2016 Sanlih Drama Awards	Best Powerful Performance Award	Josie Leung	Nominated
2016	2016 Sanlih Drama Awards	Best Powerful Performance Award	Yin Chao-te	Nominated
2016	2016 Sanlih Drama Awards	Best Crying Award	Mini Tsai & Yin Chao-te	Nominated
2016	2016 Sanlih Drama Awards	Best Kiss Award	Marcus Chang & Ivy Shao	Nominated
2016	2016 Sanlih Drama Awards	Best Screen Couple Award	Marcus Chang & Ivy Shao	Won
2016	2016 Sanlih Drama Awards	Best Screen Couple Award	Mini Tsai & Yorke Sun	Nominated
2016	2016 Sanlih Drama Awards	Viewers Choice Drama's Song Award	"A Friend" - Gary Chaw	Nominated
2016	2016 Sanlih Drama Awards	Viewers Choice Drama's Song Award	"Two People" - Alien Huang	Nominated
2016	2016 Sanlih Drama Awards	Viewers Choice Drama's Song Award	"Only These Words Tonight" - Nine Chen feat. Shi Shi	Nominated
