= Your Name Engraved Herein (song) =

2020 single by Crowd Lu

"刻在我心底的名字"

Song by Crowd Lu
- Language: Mandarin
- English title: Your Name Engraved Herein
- Released: August 25, 2020
- Studio: Wings of Dreams Creative Multimedia Studio (winds); Lights Up Studio (guitar)
- Genre: Mandopop; Sentimental ballad
- Length: 5:42
- Label: Team Ear Music
- Songwriters: Hooi Yuen Teng, Keon Chia, Tan Boon Wah
- Producer: Yanis Huang

Music video
- "Your Name Engraved Herein" on YouTube

"Your Name Engraved Herein" (Chinese: 刻在我心底的名字; pinyin: Kè zài wǒ xīndǐ de míngzì) is a song by Taiwanese singer Crowd Lu, released by Team Ear Music as a digital download on 25 August 2020. The song is the theme song of the Taiwanese LGBTQ film Your Name Engraved Herein, and is the third film theme song that Lu recorded at the invitation of the film's producer Qu Youning. A sentimental ballad, its lyrics extend the unspoken feelings of the film's two protagonists, leading listeners to associate the song with first love.

As of November 2025, the music video for "Your Name Engraved Herein" has surpassed 78 million views on YouTube. The song reached number one on the weekly Mandarin KKBOX charts in Hong Kong, Malaysia, Singapore, and Taiwan, and placed within the top ten on the annual cumulative charts in those regions. It has been covered numerous times since its release, including by Edward Chen, one of the leads in Your Name Engraved Herein, as well as by singers such as Waa Wei, William Wei, Eric Chou, and Jolin Tsai, and by bands such as Mayday. The song was performed by Lu and Chen at the 57th Golden Horse Awards, where it won the award for Best Original Film Song. It also won the Golden Melody Award for Song of the Year at the 32nd Golden Melody Awards.

== Background and release ==
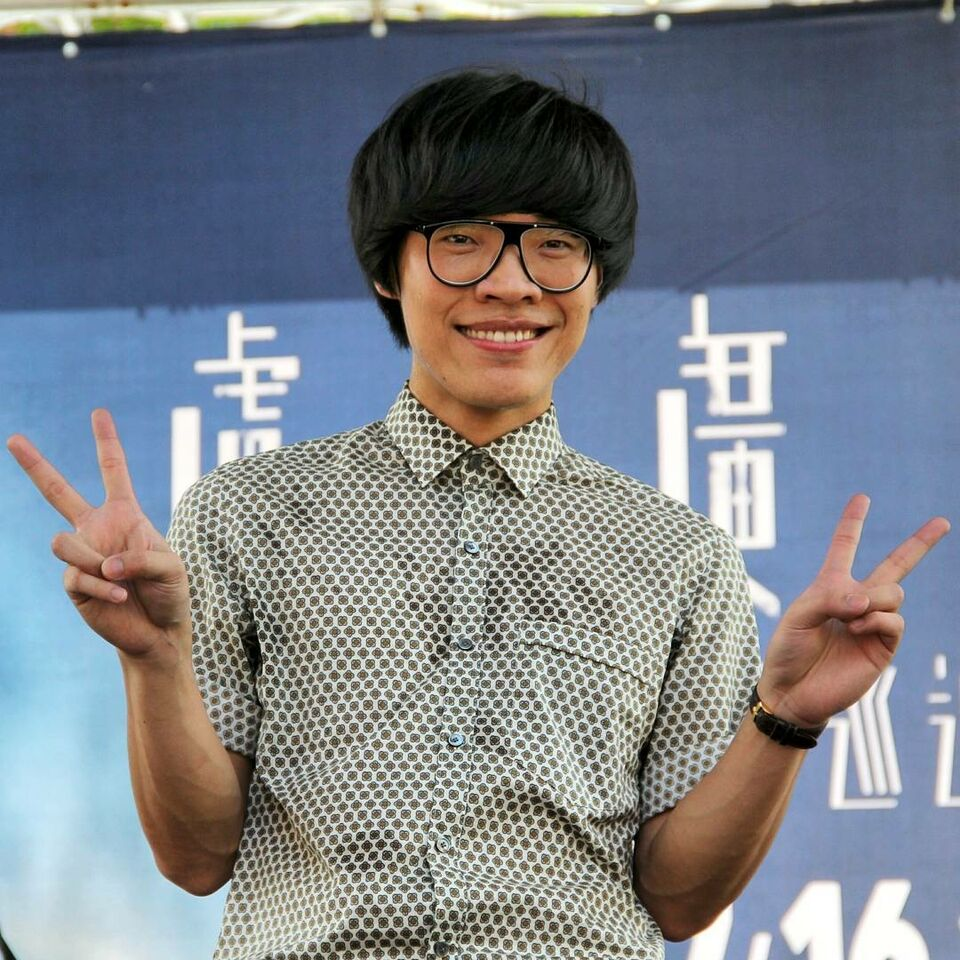
Crowd Lu, the performer of "Your Name Engraved Herein"

Following his earlier popular hits "He-R" (魚仔) and "You Complete Me" (幾分之幾), this was the third time Lu had been invited by Qu Youning—the producer of the film Your Name Engraved Herein—to perform a film theme song. Lu remarked that he rarely sings songs he has not written himself, and described the collaboration as a rare opportunity, saying that he has always believed "love has no fixed form." He added that he was deeply moved after watching the film, and that its scenes of awkward, youthful student romance reminded him of his own past, which prompted him to accept the role of vocalist. In a deliberate departure from the "you" (你) in the film's title, the song's title substitutes the character "me" (我). This was a creative touch by the film's production team, who felt that "Your Name Engraved Herein" should be a song that anyone could dedicate to the person they love most.

"Your Name Engraved Herein" was released as a digital download on 25 August 2020. Its music video was uploaded to YouTube by Team Ear Music on 24 August 2020, and as of November 2025 it has accumulated more than 78 million views.

== Music and lyrics ==
"Your Name Engraved Herein" is a sentimental ballad, with lyrics by Hooi Yuen Teng (許媛婷) and music by Keon Chia (佳旺) and Tan Boon Wah (陳文華). Chia, a Malaysian songwriter, recalled that the project began as a commission from the record company; he therefore invited Tan to compose the melody with him before handing the work over to Hooi to write the lyrics. The song is written in the key of B-flat major, with a tempo of 136 beats per minute, and a total length of five minutes and 42 seconds. The lyrics give voice to the unspoken feelings of the film's two protagonists, as though they were murmuring at night to the person they long for. The line "since I have decided to love just once, it lasts a lifetime" (既然決定愛上一次就一輩子) evokes the purity of first love—falling for someone so completely and recklessly that nothing else seems to matter. The closing section of the song is sung a cappella by Lu, who later said that as he sang it, he "imagined there was someone, a name engraved in my heart, and sang to her with deep feeling."

== Reception ==
The judges of the 57th Golden Horse Awards considered that "Your Name Engraved Herein" achieved a "remarkably high intensity" in advancing the narrative and shaping the characters of the film Your Name Engraved Herein. While voting on the Best Original Film Song award, the judges reportedly sang the song aloud, concluding that it was "truly engraved in the heart." ELLE commented that Lu's voice was gentle and soothing, and that the lyrics, like the melody, were tear-jerking in the way they recalled the listener's own first love. La Vie observed that, as the film's theme song, the track gradually articulates the characterisation of the two leads in a manner consistent with the film, runs through the whole story, underscores its layered emotions, and lends greater permanence to the bittersweet melancholy of the film. Share99 noted that Lu excels at conveying delicate emotion through his voice, and that the lyrics flow gently within the melody like a stirring monologue, expressing long-suppressed love and abundant longing in a plain yet profound manner. The song was also well received by online users.

After its release, "Your Name Engraved Herein" topped the weekly Mandarin single charts of KKBOX in Hong Kong, Malaysia, Singapore, and Taiwan. It also reached number 4 on the weekly Pop Music Gold Chart and number 1 on the weekly chart of the Recording Industry Association Singapore. On 3 December 2020, YouTube announced its 2020 year-end video rankings for Taiwan via the official Google Taiwan blog, with "Your Name Engraved Herein" placing third among the most popular music videos. On 1 January 2021, KKBOX published its final 2020 annual cumulative rankings for Mandarin singles, in which the song placed within the top ten in every region: third in Hong Kong, tenth in Malaysia, seventh in Singapore, and sixth in Taiwan. On 29 January 2021, Hit FM published its Top 100 Singles of the Year, on which the song ranked second.

== Live performances ==
Lu performed "Your Name Engraved Herein" on numerous occasions after its release. On 28 September 2020, he sang the song solo at the premiere of Your Name Engraved Herein, then performed it together with the film's lead actors Edward Chen and Tseng Jing-hua, before finally singing it with the entire cast. On 21 November 2020, unable to attend the 57th Golden Horse Awards in person, Lu connected to the ceremony via a live video link from his concert in Kaohsiung and performed the song together with Chen.

== Cover versions ==
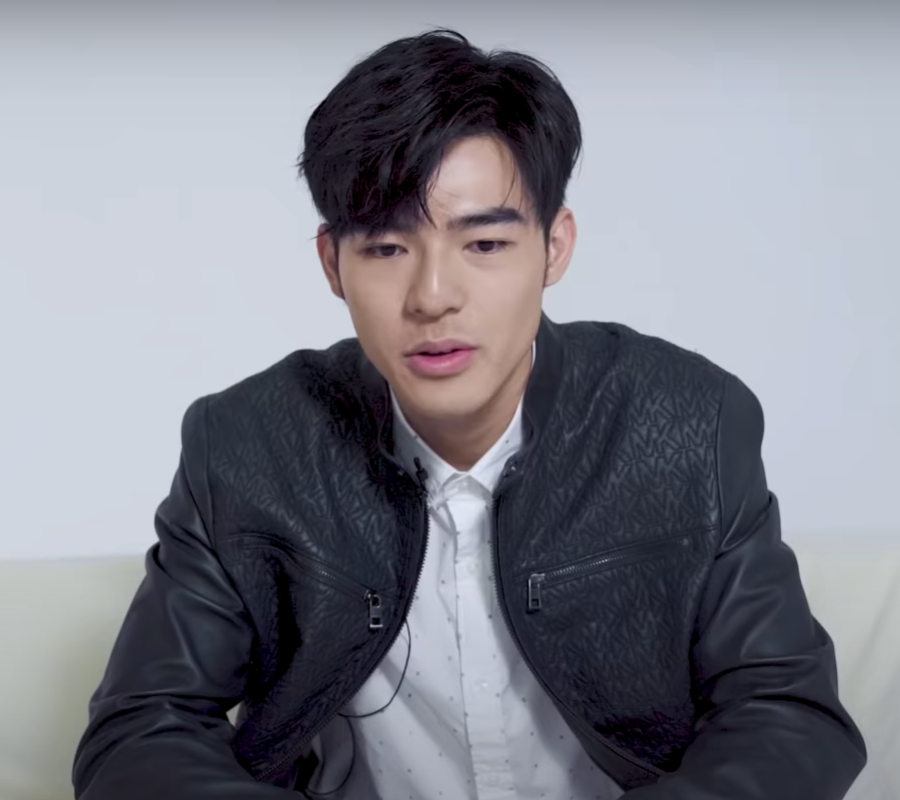
Edward Chen also performed "Your Name Engraved Herein" in the film Your Name Engraved Herein.

In the film, one of the male leads, Chang Chia-han (A-han, played by Edward Chen), sings "Your Name Engraved Herein" to the other lead, Wang Po-te (Birdy, played by Tseng Jing-hua), over a payphone. Within the story, the song is written by A-han for Birdy, although A-han conceals this, claiming that "a senior wrote it." Chen, who plays A-han, later recorded his own cover of the song as a gesture of thanks to fans; it was released through HIM International Music on YouTube on 21 October 2020. The recording marked Chen's first time in a professional studio and his first vocal recording. At the 57th Golden Horse Awards, Chen also performed the song together with Lu, who appeared via live video link.

Besides Chen, "Your Name Engraved Herein" has been covered many times since its release, by singers including Waa Wei, Nadia Lo, Prince Chiu, Lala Hsu, Boon Hui Lu, William Wei, Eric Chou, Jolin Tsai, Hebe Tien, Nana Lee, and Wu Wen-fang, as well as by bands such as Mayday.

== Production credits ==
Credits are adapted from the official website of Team Ear Music.

Studios

- Winds: Wings of Dreams Creative Multimedia Studio
- Guitar: Lights Up Studio

Personnel

- Vocals: Crowd Lu
- Songwriting: Hooi Yuen Teng, Keon Chia, Tan Boon Wah
- Producer: Yanis Huang
- Arrangement: Yanis Huang
- Mixing: Yanis Huang
- Wind recording engineer: Yanis Huang
- Acoustic guitar: Josa
- Classical guitar: Cheung Chung-lin
- Flute: Chika Miyazaki
- Trombone: Song Guangqing
- French horn: Xiao Chongjie
- Trumpet: Kenneth Koo
- Guitar recording engineer: Shan Weiming
- Guitar recording assistant: Yu Shizheng

== Plagiarism controversy ==
On 28 August 2021, the entertainer Jacky Wu (吳宗憲), while attending a public event, questioned whether "Your Name Engraved Herein" was an original work and alleged that it plagiarised the Western oldie "Reality" by Richard Sanderson. Some netizens further claimed that the song's introduction was identical to the piano piece "Jiyūgaoka" (自由が丘) by mainland Chinese musician JINBAO. The following day, other netizens suggested the song was even more similar to the 2015 Japanese hymn "Shu wa warera no taiyō" (主は我らの太陽).

In response to Wu's allegations, Qu Youning, the film's producer, wrote on Facebook on 29 August that labelling the song "plagiarism" amounted to a trumped-up charge, and that Lu, who was merely the performer, was being unfairly subjected to public criticism. Team Ear Music responded that, after comparison, it believed there were certain differences between the two songs, while expressing respect for Wu's view. Warner Chappell Music's Taiwan branch, which holds the copyright to "Your Name Engraved Herein", also issued a statement through its lawyer, Hsu Tse-yu, that afternoon, affirming that the song was an original work by Hooi Yuen Teng, Keon Chia, and Tan Boon Wah, and was certainly not plagiarised. In the early hours of 30 August, co-writer Chia again clarified on Facebook that the song was an original work, stating that only the melody of the line "once stubbornly stood against the world" (曾頑固跟世界對峙) resembled that of "Reality", and that he himself had heard "Jiyūgaoka" for the first time only on 29 August.

On 29 August, JINBAO responded to the controversy by saying that "Your Name Engraved Herein" and "Jiyūgaoka" were "indeed quite similar at the beginning. However, in pop songs it is not unusual for a few phrases to sound alike, and it is perfectly normal for the harmonic progression to be the same." The Ministry of Culture and the Taipei Golden Horse Film Festival Executive Committee, which oversee the Golden Melody and Golden Horse awards respectively, stated that since no final legal ruling had found the song to be in copyright dispute, its awards would not be revoked. On 30 August, Richard Sanderson, the original performer of "Reality", replied to a private message from a Dcard user about the controversy, saying that "apart from the two choruses being slightly similar, I cannot say for certain that there is any plagiarism", and describing "Your Name Engraved Herein" as "a very good song."

== Awards ==
"Your Name Engraved Herein" was performed by Lu and Chen at the 57th Golden Horse Awards, where it won Best Original Film Song. Having previously won a Golden Melody Award and a Golden Bell Award, Lu thereby became a "Triple Crown" entertainer by adding a Golden Horse Award. Besides Lu and Chen, the song's co-writers Hooi Yuen Teng, Keon Chia, and Tan Boon Wah also received Golden Horse Awards.

The Best Original Film Song category at the 57th Golden Horse Awards saw a reversal of fortunes: the award initially went to the title theme of the film Little Big Women, before "Your Name Engraved Herein" overturned the result and the judges moved to reopen the decision. The judges felt that the nominated songs from both Your Name Engraved Herein and Little Big Women had achieved a "remarkably high intensity" in advancing their respective narratives and characters, prompting them to deliberate further. Ultimately, during the vote the judges sang the song aloud and concluded that "Your Name Engraved Herein" was "truly engraved in the heart", securing its victory.

In 2021, the song won the "Popular Taiwanese Film Song" prize at the 2020 Yahoo! Search Popularity Awards, and was nominated for "Special Mention – Original Film Song" at the 2nd Taiwan Film Critics Society Awards. In August of the same year, it won "Hito Film Theme Song" at the 2021 Hito Music Awards on 12 August, and the Golden Melody Award for Song of the Year at the 32nd Golden Melody Awards on 21 August.

Year	Ceremony	Award	Result	Ref.
2020	57th Golden Horse Awards	Best Original Film Song	Won	
2020	Google YouTube 2020 Taiwan "Popular Music Videos"	Top 3	Won	
2021	2020 Yahoo! Search Popularity Awards	Popular Taiwanese Film Song	Won	
2021	2nd Taiwan Film Critics Society Awards	Special Mention – Original Film Song	Nominated	
2021	2021 Hito Music Awards	Hito Film Theme Song	Won	
2021	32nd Golden Melody Awards	Song of the Year	Won	

== Charts ==
=== Year-end charts ===
Chart (2020)	Position
Hong Kong (KKBOX Mandarin Singles)	3
Malaysia (KKBOX Mandarin Singles)	10
Singapore (KKBOX Mandarin Singles)	7
Taiwan (KKBOX Mandarin Singles)	6
Taiwan (Hit FM Top 100 Singles of the Year)	2

=== Weekly charts ===
Chart (2020–2021)	Peak position
Hong Kong (KKBOX Mandarin Singles)	1
Malaysia (KKBOX Mandarin Singles)	1
Singapore (Recording Industry Association Singapore)	1
Singapore (KKBOX Mandarin Singles)	1
Taiwan (KKBOX Mandarin Singles)	1
Chinese-speaking regions (Pop Music Gold Chart)	4
