= No haste, be patient =

Taiwanese economic policy

"No Haste, Be Patient" was an economic policy proposed by President Lee Teng-hui of the Republic of China (Taiwan) on 14 September 1996 at the National Operators' Conference. The policy aimed to discourage Taiwanese businesses from investing in mainland China.

== Under the Lee Teng-hui administration ==
The origins of the "No Haste, Be Patient" policy can be traced back to 1987, when Sun Yun-Suan expressed similar views in an interview with World Magazine.

In the 1990s, President Lee Teng-hui and Premier Hau Pei-tsun issued three major injunctions in response to the Formosa Plastics Group's proposed large-scale investment in the Haicang Project in mainland China. If Formosa Plastics were to sign an agreement with China regarding the Haicang Plan, the government warned that it would halt trading of Formosa Plastics' shares, order relevant banks to freeze the group's funds, and restrict the overseas travel of the company's top executives. Faced with these measures, Formosa Plastics was ultimately forced to abandon the investment.

Prior to 2000, in addition to the "No Haste, Be Patient" approach, there were competing perspectives. Former Democratic Progressive Party (DPP) chairman Hsu Hsin-liang advocated for a policy of "bold westward advancement", while another faction within the DPP promoted "strong westward advancement". The bold westward school believed that large-scale Taiwanese business expansion into the mainland could help exert influence over China, thereby enhancing Taiwan's security. In contrast, proponents of the "No Haste" policy argued that over-reliance on the mainland's labour force and market would erode Taiwan's autonomy and multi-layered security. They also contended that Taiwanese business leaders could become spokespeople for the Chinese Communist Party (CCP) within Taiwan, and that such overexpansion could lead to asymmetric political and economic influence.

In late 1994, the renminbi was devalued by 45%, prompting a surge in foreign investment into mainland China and leading to capital outflows from other East Asian economies.

On 14 August 1996, in response to a proposal from National People's Congress delegates regarding the state of the nation, Lee Teng-hui stated in the National Assembly that the idea of considering mainland China as the hinterland for the development of an Asia–Pacific Regional Operations Centre must be reassessed. On 14 September of the same year, he formally introduced the "No Haste, Be Patient" policy. He specified that three categories of investment—high-tech, investments exceeding US$50 million, and infrastructure—should be subject to the policy's restrictions, in order to protect Taiwan's research and development capacity and prevent excessive capital outflows. The announcement sparked criticism from the industrial and commercial sectors and ignited a broader debate over how to balance national security with corporate interests.

During his tenure as Premier, Vincent Siew upheld the "No Haste, Be Patient" policy as a central pillar of cross-strait economic strategy, following the direction set by President Lee. In 1998, he emphasised that any reconsideration or adjustment of the policy should be contingent upon the Chinese Communist Party ending its hostility towards Taiwan, acknowledging the reciprocal separation of powers across the Taiwan Strait, treating Taiwan with equality and reciprocity, ceasing efforts to block Taiwan's international participation, and formally guaranteeing the rights of Taiwanese investors in the mainland in a manner that would not undermine Taiwan's economic stability.

== Under the Chen Shui-bian administration ==
In 2000, following the election of Chen Shui-bian as president, a global economic downturn coincided with increasing pressure from the industrial sector to relax the "No Haste, Be Patient" policy. In response, Chen replaced the policy with a new approach termed "active openness, effective management". On 1 January 2006, in his New Year's Day address, he further adjusted the phrasing to "active management, effective openness".

Former Democratic Progressive Party (DPP) legislator Lin Cho-shui criticised this shift, commenting on the contradictions in Chen's stance. Lin remarked that it was unusual for Chen to be portrayed as an "anti-westward" figure, as prior to 2005, he had been aligned with the pro-westward camp. After assuming office, Chen authorised the opening of the "Mini Three Links", amended the Act Governing Relations between the People of the Taiwan Area and the Mainland Area, eased restrictions on visits by Chinese nationals to Taiwan, and relaxed rules on investment in mainland China. By the end of 2004, the administration had formally approved a "positive opening" policy.

However, the implementation of these initiatives was hindered by cross-strait tensions and delays in the full opening of the Three Direct Links. The Kuomintang (KMT) criticised the situation as "locking up the country", which contributed to the public perception that the Chen administration was opposed to cross-strait exchanges and the Three Links. This portrayal led some disaffected groups within Taiwan's "M-shaped" income distribution to view Chen as a symbol of economic nationalism. Despite this, Lin Cho-shui acknowledged that increased westward economic engagement had the potential to worsen income inequality in Taiwan, though he argued that neither haste nor hesitation could adequately resolve the issue.

== Estimation ==
=== Positive perspectives ===
In 2020, a public opinion poll in Taiwan found that 68.1% of respondents supported former President Lee Teng-hui's policy of caution and patience, viewing it as a measure to prevent the rapid loss of Taiwan's industries.

=== Critical perspectives ===
Media commentator Zhao Shaokang argued that the effectiveness of using political power to interfere in the economy is limited. He suggested that, rather than imposing restrictions, Taiwan should consider cooperating with mainland Chinese companies or even seek ways to gain a dominant position in economic relations.

Writer and politician Li Ao criticised the policy as contradictory, describing it as a "cannot order, but also do not receive orders" approach. He satirised what he perceived as excessive patience, referring to it as an "ostrich policy". Li asserted that businesspeople are more pragmatic than politicians and would naturally rush to secure early positions in the mainland Chinese market to seize business opportunities. He added: "Taiwan should seize the opportunity and make use of the situation. What is there to endure or not endure? If there are benefits, endure. If there are no benefits, why endure?"

=== Other perspectives ===
On 29 January 2007, in an exclusive interview with Next Magazine, Lee Teng-hui stated that his policy did not imply total disengagement from mainland China. He expressed concern over the lack of a communication platform across the Taiwan Strait. Lee criticised the Democratic Progressive Party (DPP), claiming that the economy should operate as a two-way street but had been reduced to a one-way flow under DPP governance: "All of Taiwan is like a bucket of water; the water flows out but does not return—how can people survive like that?" He also criticized the DPP: "Policies have changed and changed, active openness has changed to active management, simply outrageous!"

On 29 June 2010, the government of the Republic of China signed the Cross-Strait Economic Cooperation Framework Agreement (ECFA) in Chongqing. President Ma Ying-jeou and Premier Liu Shao-Hsuan viewed the agreement as a key policy to boost Taiwan's economic development. The "No Haste, Be Patient" approach was considered effectively suspended following the signing. However, after the outbreak of the Sunflower Student Movement in 2014, cross-strait exchanges came to an abrupt halt.

== A lost or apocryphal story ==
According to an apocryphal account, the phrase "No haste, be patient" originated as a motto given by Emperor Kangxi to his fourth son, Yinzhen, who later became Emperor Yongzheng of the Qing dynasty.

In 1996, President Lee Teng-hui used the phrase "quit haste and use patience" for the first time in a speech at the National Operators' Conference to describe his vision for the Republic of China's economic policy towards mainland China. Reportedly, the organisers of the conference—known as HD—were frustrated by Lee's reluctance to attend due to their interest in investing in mainland China. However, Lee changed his mind the night before the event and instructed his secretary, Su Chi-cheng, to prepare a speech.

Su, under time pressure, reportedly drafted the speech at home overnight. Drawing from his conversation with Lee and in need of a suitable phrase, he allegedly referred to an idiom dictionary on his desk and included the line "Do not be in a hurry, have patience" in the final draft. Due to the rushed circumstances, the origin of the phrase was not verified, and the inclusion of "No haste, be patient" may have been a coincidental creation by Su.

== See also ==
- Hide your strength, bide your time
