= May 17 Statement =

2004 declaration by the Taiwan Affairs Office

The May 17 Statement, also called the May 17 Declaration, was a statement jointly issued by the Office for Taiwan Affairs under the Central Committee of the Chinese Communist Party and the Taiwan Affairs Office of the State Council of the People's Republic of China on 17 May 2004.

Issued three days before Chen Shui-bian's second inaugural, it gave the Taiwanese leadership two choices - "The Taiwan leaders have before them two roads: one is to pull back immediately from their dangerous lurch toward independence, recognizing that both sides of the Taiwan Straits belong to the one and same China and dedicating their efforts to closer cross-Straits relations; the other is play with fire and attempt to cut Taiwan away from China". Though the language used was considered tough, this declaration broke tradition in that it offered different options, as opposed to the firm edicts issued in the past, and addressed "the issue of international living space of the Taiwan region", although the insistence on Taiwan's recognition of One China Policy still has not loosened.

It was intended to convince that it was in Taiwanese interests to recognize the One China Policy, which President Chen has thus far rejected.

There are seven points in the declaration :

1. Resumption of cross-Straits dialogue and negotiations, formal ending of the state of hostility through equal-footed consultations, establishing a mechanism of mutual trust in the military field, and jointly building a framework for peaceful, stable and growing cross-Straits relations.
2. Maintaining close links in an appropriate manner between the two sides of the Straits so as to address the problems in cross-Straits relations through timely consultations.
3. Realizing comprehensive, direct and two-way "Three Links" so as to facilitate commerce, trade, exchanges, travel, tourism and other activities by compatriots on both sides.
4. Establishing closer economic co-operation arrangement on the basis of reciprocity and mutual benefit. Taiwan can acquire greater market access on the mainland for its agricultural products.
5. Increasing exchanges between the compatriots on the two sides of the Straits in the interest of removing misunderstanding, enhancing mutual trust and building common ground.
6. The Taiwan compatriots can realize their aspirations for cross-Straits peace, social stability and economic prosperity while enjoying harmony and tranquility in cross-Straits ties.
7. Properly addressing the issue of international living space of the Taiwan region commensurate with its status so as to share the dignity of the Chinese nation.

Local reporters labelled this statement as CPC General Secretary and Chinese President Hu Jintao's "seven points", as opposed to former general secretary Jiang Zemin's declaration of "Jiang's eight points".

== See also ==
- Cross-Strait relations
- Political status of Taiwan
