= Chen Shui-bian =

President of the Republic of China from 2000 to 2008

- 陳水扁
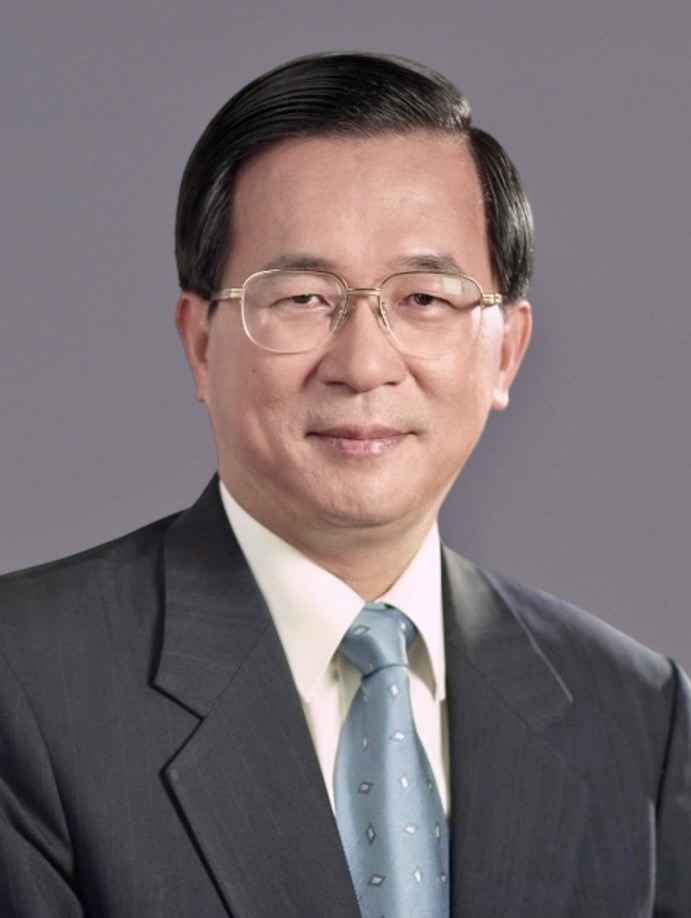
- Official portrait, 2000

5th President of the Republic of China
- In office 20 May 2000 – 20 May 2008
- Premier: See list: Tang Fei; Chang Chun-hsiung; Yu Shyi-kun; Frank Hsieh; Su Tseng-chang; Chang Chun-hsiung
- Vice President: Annette Lu
- Preceded by: Lee Teng-hui
- Succeeded by: Ma Ying-jeou

9th & 12th Chairman of the Democratic Progressive Party
- In office 15 October 2007 – 12 January 2008
- Secretary General: Cho Jung-tai
- Preceded by: Yu Shyi-kun
- Succeeded by: Frank Hsieh (acting)
- In office 21 July 2002 – 11 December 2004
- Secretary General: Chang Chun-hsiung
- Preceded by: Frank Hsieh
- Succeeded by: Ker Chien-ming (acting)

10th Mayor of Taipei
- In office 25 December 1994 – 25 December 1998
- Preceded by: Huang Ta-chou (as appointed mayor)
- Succeeded by: Ma Ying-jeou

Member of the Legislative Yuan
- In office 1 February 1990 – 25 December 1994
- Constituency: Taipei I

Taipei City Councillor
- In office 25 December 1981 – 28 September 1985
- Constituency: Taipei II (Songshan, Neihu, Nangang)

Leader of the Justice Alliance faction
- In office 1991–2006
- Preceded by: Office established
- Succeeded by: Office abolished

Personal details
- Born: 12 October 1950 (age 76) Guantian District, Tainan County, Taiwan
- Party: Democratic Progressive (1987–2008, 2013–2019, since 2020–)
- Other political affiliations: Independent (1979–1987, 2008–2013); Kuomintang (1970–1987) (Note: Chen participated in the Tangwai movement, although he was officially a Kuomintang member until 1987.); Taiwan Action Party Alliance (2019–2020)
- Spouse: Wu Shu-chen (m. 1975)
- Education: National Taiwan University (LLB)

Chinese name
- Traditional Chinese: 陳水扁
- Simplified Chinese: 陈水扁
Transcriptions
Standard Mandarin
- Hanyu Pinyin: Chén Shuǐbiǎn
- Wade–Giles: Ch'en^{2} Shui^{3}-pien^{3}
- Tongyong Pinyin: Chén Shuěi-biǎn
- IPA: [ʈʂʰə̌n ʂwěɪ.pjɛ̀n]
Southern Min
- Hokkien POJ: Tân Chúi-píⁿ
- Tâi-lô: Tân Tsuí-pínn

Chen Shui-bian (Chinese: 陳水扁; pinyin: Chén Shuǐbiǎn; born 12 October 1950) is a Taiwanese politician and lawyer who served as the fifth president of the Republic of China from 2000 to 2008. Chen was the first president from the Democratic Progressive Party (DPP), ending the Kuomintang's (KMT) 55 years of continuous rule in Taiwan. He is sometimes referred to by the nickname A-Bian (阿扁). He was previously the mayor of Taipei from 1994 to 1998 and the chairman of the Democratic Progressive Party for two terms (2002–2004; 2007–2008).

Chen was born in Guantian District, Tainan County to an impoverished farming family. After graduating from National Taiwan University in 1974, he worked as a lawyer, making a name for himself as a human rights lawyer and supporter of Taiwanese independence. He was elected to the Taipei City Council in 1981 under the Tangwai movement, beginning his political career. He joined the Democratic Progressive Party in 1987 and was elected to the Legislative Yuan, serving from 1989 to 1994, when he became the first directly-elected DPP Mayor of Taipei in the 1994 mayoral elections. As mayor, Chen led reforms to improve the civil service, oversaw the construction of the Taipei Metro to completion, and launched a crackdown on crime and prostitution. Following his defeat in the 1998 mayoral elections to Ma Ying-jeou despite a positive approval rating, he ran for president in the 2000 Taiwanese presidential election, defeating his two rivals James Soong and incumbent vice president Lien Chan following a split in the ruling Kuomintang, marking the first peaceful transfer of power to an opposition party in Taiwan.

Chen was re-elected in the hotly-contested and polarising 2004 election after a narrow and contested victory over a joint ticket of his 2000 rivals, Lien and Soong. Chen was succeeded by Ma Ying-jeou at the end of his term in 2008 where the Kuomintang defeated the DPP in a landslide in the 2008 elections.

Chen was arrested in November 2008 on charges of corruption and sentenced to life imprisonment before being commuted to 20 years imprisonment. Chen was released from prison on medical parole in 2015.

== Early life and education ==
Chen was born to an impoverished tenant farming family of Hoklo ethnicity in Kuantien Township of Tainan County (now part of Tainan City) on the second day of the ninth lunar month in 1950 but was not formally issued a birth certificate until 18 February 1951, because of doubts that he would survive.

Chen was educated in Mandarin Chinese, which had replaced Japanese as the national language following the end of the Japanese administration of Taiwan. Academically bright from a young age, he graduated from the prestigious National Tainan First Senior High School with honors. In June 1969, he was admitted to National Taiwan University. Initially a business administration major, he switched to law in his first year and became editor of the school's law review. He passed the bar exams before the completion of his junior year with the highest score, becoming Taiwan's youngest lawyer. He graduated in 1974 with an LL.B. in commercial law.

In 1975, he married Wu Shu-chen, the daughter of a physician. The couple have a daughter, Chen Hsing-yu, who is a dentist; and a son, Chen Chih-chung, who, having received a law degree in Taiwan, gained a Master of Laws from the University of California, Berkeley in 2005.

From 1976 to 1989, Chen was a partner in Formosa International Marine and Commercial Law, specializing in maritime insurance. He held the firm's portfolio for Evergreen Marine Corporation.

== Entry into politics ==
Chen became involved in politics in 1980 when he defended the participants of the Kaohsiung Incident in a military court. While his client Huang Hsin-chieh, the leading opposition dissident, and seven co-defendants, including his future Vice President Annette Lu, were found guilty, Chen came to be known for his forceful and colorful arguments. He has stated that it was during this period that he realized the unfairness of the political system in Taiwan and became politically active as a member of the Tangwai movement.

Chen won a seat in the Taipei City Council as a Tangwai candidate in 1981 and served until 1985. In 1984, he founded the pro-opposition Civil Servant Public Policy Research Association, which published a magazine called Neo-Formosa. On 12 January 1985, Chen was sentenced to a year in prison for libel as a result of his editorship of Neo-Formosa, following the publication of an article which claimed that the doctoral dissertation of Elmer Fung, a college philosophy professor (who would later become a New Party legislator), was plagiarized.

While appealing the sentence, he returned to Tainan to run for county magistrate in November 1985. Three days after losing the election, his wife, Wu Shu-chen was hit twice by a hand tractor driven by Chang Jong-tsai as Chen and Wu were thanking their supporters. She was left paralyzed from the waist down. His supporters believed this was part of a government campaign to intimidate him, although another theory says it was a simple traffic accident.

Chen lost his appeal in May 1986 and began serving eight months in the Tucheng Penitentiary along with Huang Tien-fu and Lee I-yang, two other defendants in the case. Whilst in Tucheng the 3 prisoners were also joined for a period of time by Chi Chia-wei a prominent gay rights activist in Taiwan. While he was in prison, his wife campaigned and was elected to the Legislative Yuan. Upon his release in 1987, Chen served as her chief counsel. In May 2022, the Transitional Justice Commission overturned Chen, Huang and Lee's libel charges.

In 1989, Chen was elected to the Legislative Yuan and served as the executive director of the Democratic Progressive Party caucus. With the support of some KMT colleagues, Chen was also elected convener of the National Defense Committee. He was instrumental in laying out and moderating many of the DPP's positions on Taiwan independence, including the four ifs. He was reelected to another three-year term in 1992, but resigned in two years to become mayor.

== Taipei mayoralty, 1994–1998 ==
Chen was elected as the mayor of Taipei in 1994, largely as the result of a vote split between the KMT incumbent Huang Ta-chou and the KMT-spin-off New Party (NP) candidate Jaw Shaw-kong. Unable to find experienced bureaucrats from his own party, Chen and his inner circle of young law school graduates retained many of the KMT administrators and delegated considerable authority.

1994 Taipei City mayoral election result
Party	#	Candidate	Votes	Percentage
Independent	1	Ji Rong-zhi (紀榮治)	3,941	0.28%
New Party	2	Jaw Shaw-kong	424,905	30.17%
Democratic Progressive Party	3	Chen Shui-bian	615,090	43.67%
Kuomintang	4	Huang Ta-chou	364,618	25.89%
Total			1,408,554	100.00%
Voter turnout				

During his term, Chen received accolades for his campaigns to drive illegal gambling and prostitution rackets out of Taipei. He levied large fines on polluters and reformed public works contracts. Chen renamed many of the roads in Taipei, most notably the road which runs between KMT headquarters to the Presidential Palace from Chieh-shou Road (介壽路) to Ketagalan Boulevard in an effort to acknowledge the aboriginal people of the Taipei basin. Chen also made highly publicized evictions of longtime KMT squatters on municipal land, and ordered Chiang Wei-kuo's estate demolished. Chen was also named one of Asia's rising stars, and Taipei became one of the top 50 cities in Asia according to Time Asia magazine.

Despite receiving more votes both in absolute and in percentage terms than his 1994 campaign, Chen lost the mayoral election of 1998 to the KMT's candidate and future president Ma Ying-jeou in large part because the KMT was able to gain the support of New Party supporters. In his first autobiography, "The Son of Taiwan", Chen wrote that he was not entirely upset about losing the re-election as it gave him opportunity to find out what areas in his political career he could improve. For example, he wrote that mainland Chinese people generally approved of his social and economic improvements in Taipei, but they ultimately voted for Ma because of ethnic tensions.

1998 Taipei City mayoral election result
Party	#	Candidate	Votes	Percentage
Democratic Progressive Party	1	Chen Shui-bian	688,072	45.91%
Kuomintang	2	Ma Ying-jeou	766,377	51.13%
New Party	3	Wang Chien-shien	44,452	2.97%
Total			1,498,901	100.00%
Voter turnout				

He also traveled extensively nationwide and abroad. In South Korea, he met with president Kim Dae-jung, who presented him with an award. He also met with Japanese prime minister Yoshiro Mori, who promised that he would celebrate if he won the 2000 presidential elections. Due to political complications, this promise was not fulfilled until late 2003.

== Presidency, 2000–2008 ==
=== First term ===
Election results by county (Green: DPP, Orange: Soong-Chang)

In an election similar to Taipei's in 1994, Chen won the 2000 presidential election on 18 March 2000, with 39% of the vote as a result of a split of factions within the Kuomintang, when James Soong ran for the presidency as an independent against the party nominee Lien Chan.

Lacking a clear mandate and inheriting a bureaucracy largely loyal to the KMT, Chen tried to reach out to his opposition. He appointed the KMT conservative mainlander Tang Fei, a former general and the incumbent defense minister, as his first premier. Only about half of Chen's original cabinet were DPP members, as few DPP politicians had risen above the local level. Although a supporter of Taiwan independence, Chen moderated his stance during his campaign and pledged the Four Noes and One Without in his inaugural address—that as long as the People's Republic of China has no intention to use military force against Taiwan, he would not declare independence nor change the national symbols of the Republic of China. He also promised to be, "president of all the people" and resigned his chairmanship from the DPP. His approval rating reached around 70%.

Chen's administration ran into many problems, and its policies were constantly blocked by the pan-Blue coalition-controlled legislature. The stock market lost over half its value within a year and unemployment reached 4.5% in part because of the Asian stock market crash. While Chen's detractors blamed Chen's poor leadership for the economic crisis, the administration blamed the legislature for blocking its relief efforts.

More troublesome for Chen was the political showdown over the construction of the Number Four Nuclear Power Facility. This multibillion-dollar project in Gongliao District was already one-third completed and favored by the pro-business KMT as a means of avoiding an energy shortage. However, the environmentalist DPP strongly objected to the expansion of nuclear power. Premier Tang had threatened to resign if the project were canceled, and Chen accepted his resignation on 3 October 2000, only four and a half months after both had taken office. Chen appointed his political ally Chang Chun-hsiung as Tang's replacement. On 27 October, Chang announced that the government would halt construction. But less than an hour earlier, Chen had met with Lien Chan to reconcile differences. Lien had asked Chen to leave the matter for the Legislative Yuan to decide and Chen seemed receptive to the suggestion. When Chang's announcement came out, Lien was furious and the KMT began an effort to recall the president. The Council of Grand Justices intervened and declared that it was the legislature and not the cabinet that had the power to decide on the issue. This was widely seen as the end of Chen's attempts to face the pan-Blue groups head on. By the end of his first year in office, Chen's approval ratings had dropped to 25%.

During the summer of 2001, Chen flew to Los Angeles, Houston, and New York City, where he met with members of the U.S. Congress. The mayor of Houston presented Chen with a key to the city and gave him cowboy clothing. His trip to New York was a first for a head of state from Taiwan as there was unwritten agreement between the US and China that no head of state from Taiwan would be permitted to visit either New York or Washington, D.C.

After his first year in office, Chen moved away from sending conciliatory gestures. In the summer of 2002, Chen again became the chairman of the DPP. During his tenure, images of Chiang Kai-shek and Chiang Ching-kuo disappeared from public buildings. The word "TAIWAN" is now printed on new ROC passports. Also continuing a trend from the previous administration, the Education Ministry revised the school curriculum to be more Taiwan-centered. Government websites have also tended to promote the notion that China is synonymous with the PRC instead of the ROC as was mandated by the KMT. The "Free China Review" was renamed the Taiwan Review and Who's Who in the ROC was renamed Who's Who in Taiwan. In January 2003, a new Taiwan-Tibet Exchange Foundation was formed but the Cabinet-level Mongolian and Tibetan Affairs Commission was not abolished. Though Chen has proposed talks with the PRC, relations remain deadlocked as Chen refused to pledge to the One-China policy, as required by the PRC for talks to begin. Such a pledge seemed unlikely for Chen since there remained strong opposition within his own party. Despite these symbolic gestures, Chen moved away from "no haste, be patient" policy and opened the three mini links.

==== Re-election campaign ====
Election results by county (Green: DPP, Blue: Lien-Soong)

In late 2003, he signed a controversial referendum bill, which he had supported but was heavily watered down by the pan-Blue majority legislature. One concession that the legislature made was to include a provision for an emergency defensive referendum and during the legislative debates it was widely believed that this clause would only be invoked if Taiwan was under imminent threat of attack from China as has been so often threatened. Within a day of the passage of the referendum bill, Chen stated his intention to invoke this provision, citing PRC's over 450 missiles aimed directly at the Taiwanese. Pan-Blue believed that his bill was only intended to benefit Chen in the coming election, as whether PRC removes the missiles would not be pressured or decided by referendum result.

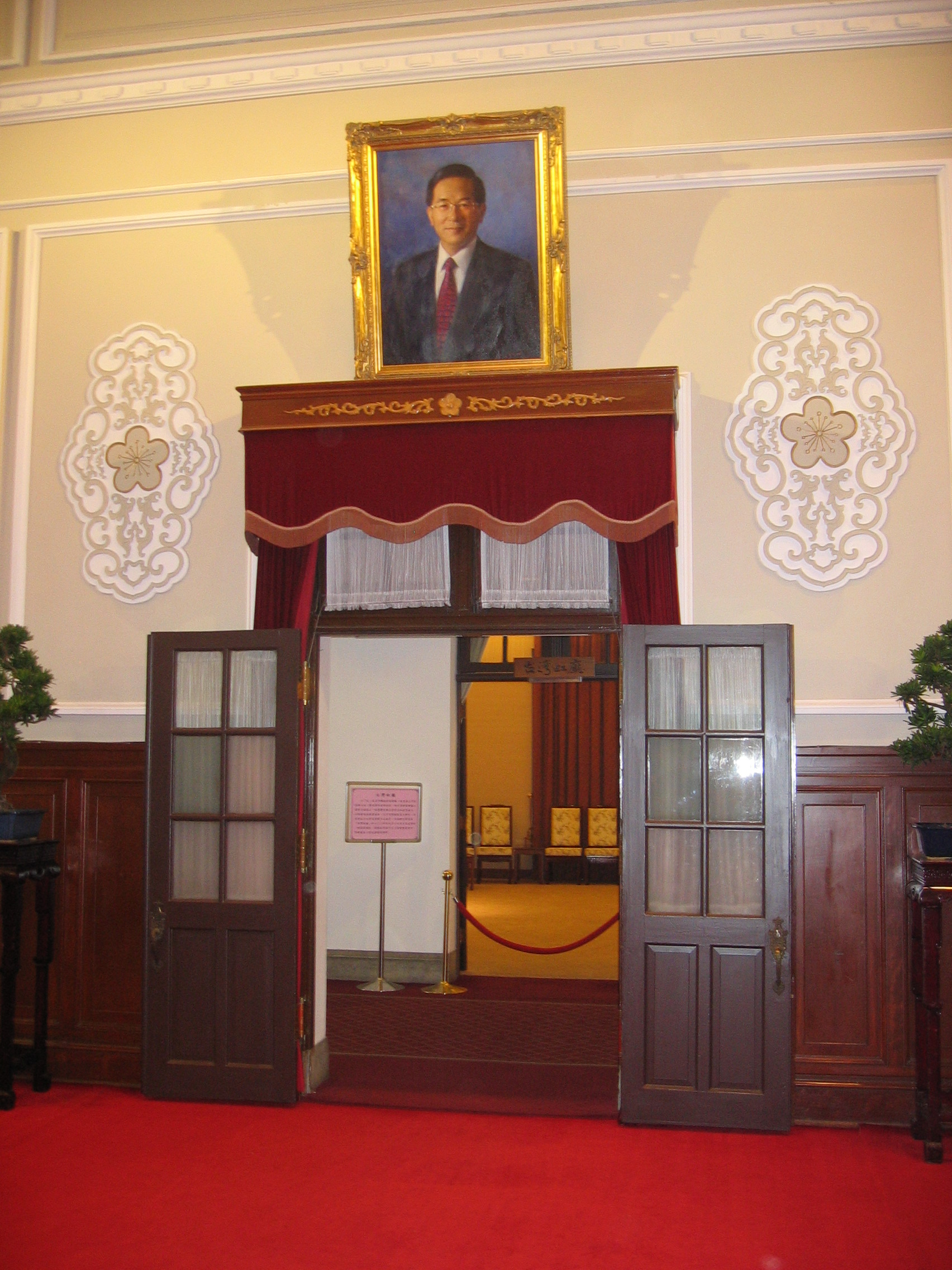
Images of Chiang Kai-shek were removed from public buildings. Chen's portrait was hung at a location in the presidential office that previously displayed a portrait of Chiang.

In October 2003, Chen flew to New York City for a second time. At the Waldorf-Astoria Hotel, he was presented with the Human Rights Award by the International League of Human Rights. In the subsequent leg of the trip to Panama, he met with US Secretary of State Colin Powell and shook hands with him. This high-profile trip raised Chen's standing in opinion polls ahead of his opponent Lien Chan for the first time at 35%, according to Agence France-Presse.

His use of the referendum in combination with his talk of a new constitution lead many among his reunification critics to believe that he would attempt to achieve Taiwan independence in his second term by invoking a referendum to create a new constitution that would formally separate Taiwan from any interpretation of China. This caused the government of the United States to follow the lead of Chen's political critics and issue a rare rebuke of Chen's actions.

Chen was shot in the stomach while campaigning in the city of Tainan on Friday, 19 March 2004, the day before polls opened on Saturday. His vice-president Annette Lu was also reportedly shot in the leg in the same incident. The following day, Chen narrowly won the election with a margin of less than 30,000 out of nearly 16 million votes cast. His referendum proposals were rejected due to insufficient turnout, in part by the pan-Blue boycott. Those that did vote for the referendum overwhelmingly favored it. Pan-Blue candidate Lien Chan refused to concede and sued both for a recount and for a nullification of the outcome while supporters held a week-long protest led by the pan-Blues front of the presidential office in Taipei. He also claimed that the shooting was staged by Chen to win sympathy votes.

Throughout the election, Chen planned to hold a referendum in 2006 on a new constitution to be enacted upon the accession of the 12th-term president in May 2008. After the election, he sought to reassure critics and moderate supporters that the new constitution would not address the issue of sovereignty, and that the current constitution was in need of comprehensive reform after more than a decade of patchwork revision.

=== Second term ===
On 20 May 2004, Chen was sworn in for his second term as president amid continued mass protests by the pan-blue alliance over the validity of his re-election. Having heard protests from pro-independence figures in Taiwan, he did not explicitly re-state the Four Noes and One Without but did state that he reaffirmed the commitments made in his first inaugural. He defended his proposals to change the constitution, but asked for constitutional reform to be undertaken through existing procedures instead of calling for a referendum for an entirely new constitution which was proposed by former president Lee Teng-hui. This would require approval by a three-fourths majority of the National Assembly which could authorize a referendum. This has two major implications. First, by going through existing constitutional amendment procedures, this has the symbolic effect of maintaining continuity with the existing constitution which was originally written in China. Second, this has the practical effect of requiring the Chen administration to get the consent of the opposition pan-Blue coalition to pass any amendments, and while the opposition is willing to consider constitutional reforms that would increase governmental efficiency, they are unlikely to support anything that would imply a de jure declaration of independence.

However, even these seemingly conciliatory gestures did not quell unease by his critics at his election. Some have pointed out that he qualified his statements on the constitution with the statement that this is a personal suggestion. Furthermore, it is widely believed in Taiwan that some of these gestures were essentially forced on him again by pressure from the United States and the PRC. The PRC has stated many times that it cares little about what Chen says, but will watch closely in the next few months to see what he does, a standard sentence that Communist China continues to quote.

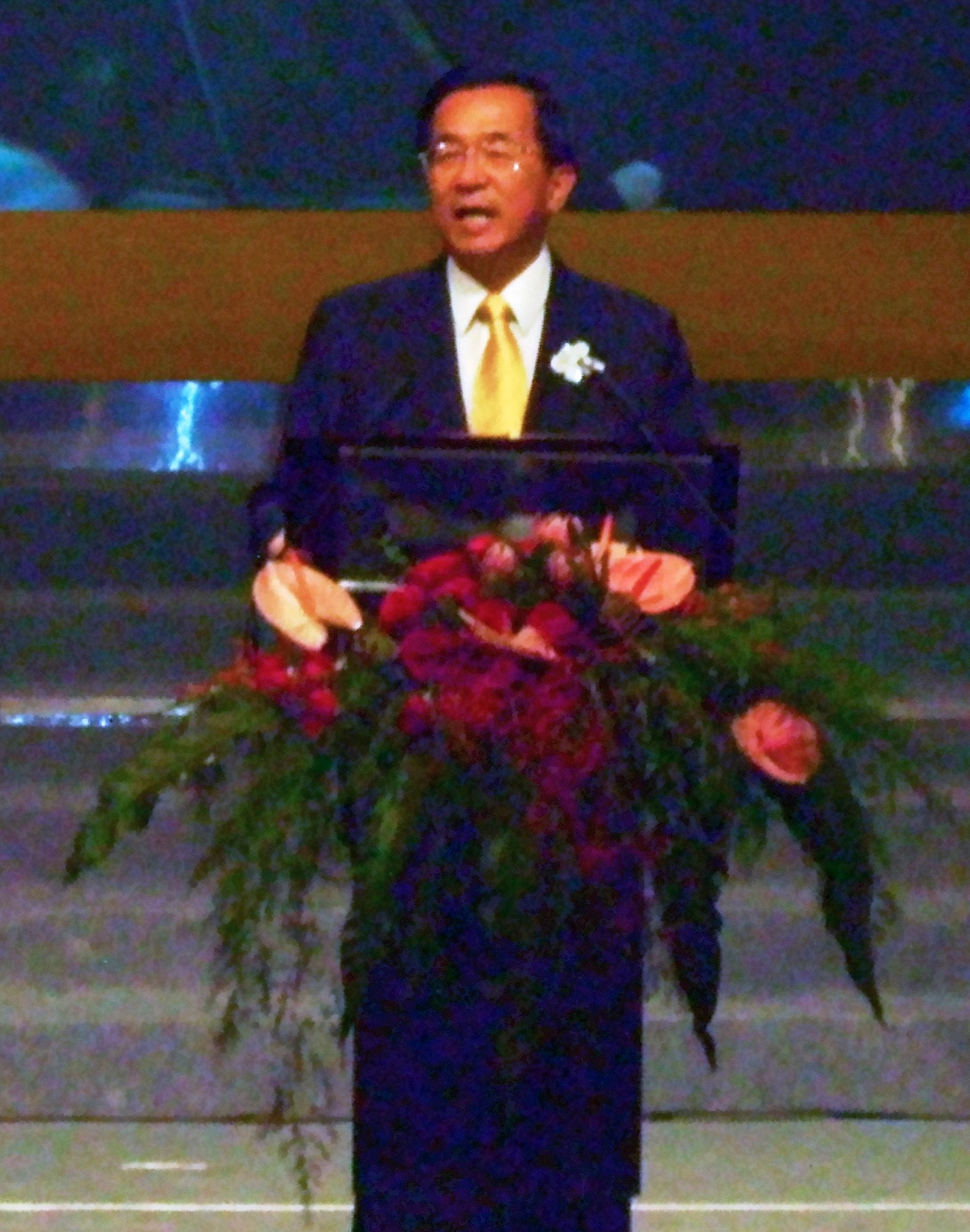
Chen Shui-bian addressed his opening speech at 2006 Taiwan Sports Elite Awards

Three days before Chen's inauguration, the Taiwan Affairs Office of the PRC issued what has become known as the May 17 Declaration. In that declaration, China accused Chen of continuing with a creep toward independence, having merely paid lip service to his commitments in his first term of office, and reiterated that there would be consequences if Chen did not halt policies toward Taiwan independence, but at the same time offered major concessions if Chen would accept the One China Principle.

In late 2004, in effort to maintain the balance of power in the region, Chen began eagerly pushing for a US$18 billion arms purchase from the United States, but the Pan-Blue Coalition repeatedly blocked the deal in the legislature. Criticism has been made of this, citing contradictory arguments used, such as that the weapons were not what Taiwan needed, or that the weapons were a good idea but too expensive. By late 2006, the KMT had signalled it would support some of the arms sale being approved, but failed to pass a revised arms bill by the end of the legislative session in early 2007, despite promises by then KMT chairman, Ma Ying-jeou, to do that.

Chen announced on 5 December that state-owned or private enterprises and foreign offices bearing the name "China", such as China Airlines, the China Steel Corporation, and Chinese Petroleum Corporation, would be renamed to bear the name "Taiwan." On 14 December 2004, following the failure of the Pan-Green coalition to gain a majority of seats in the 2004 ROC legislative election (as many had expected to occur), Chen resigned as chairman of the DPP. This dashed hopes that the stalemate that plagued Chen's first term would end.

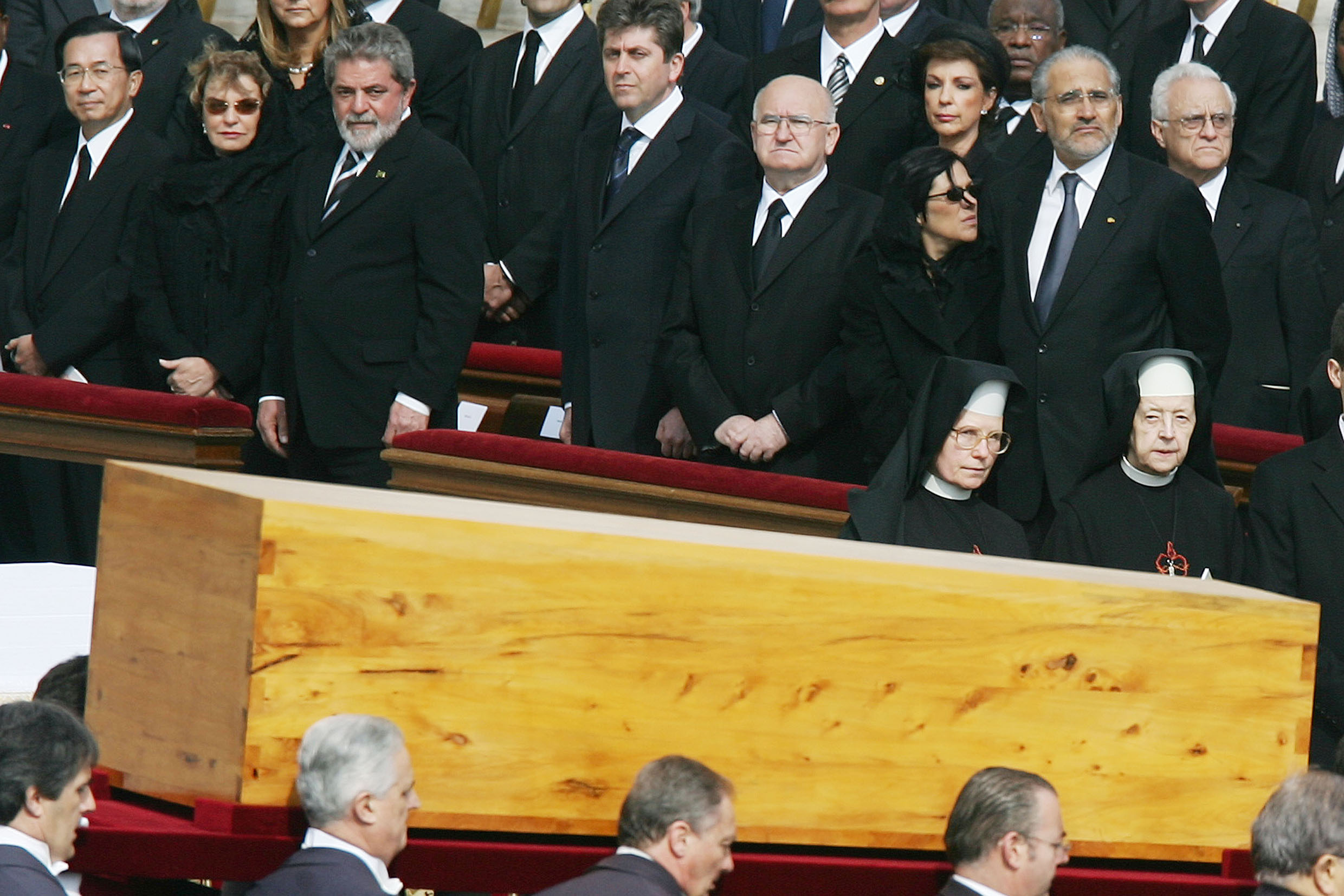
At the funeral of Pope John Paul II, Chen (far left), whom the Holy See recognized as the head of state of China, was seated in the front row (in French alphabetical order) beside the first lady and president of Brazil.

In 2005 Chen became the first ROC president to visit Europe, when he attended the funeral of Pope John Paul II in the Vatican City (the Holy See continues to maintain diplomatic relations with the ROC). In order to shore up diplomatic support, it is common for the ROC president to visit the ROC's remaining diplomatic allies; however, past presidents had been prevented from visiting the Vatican because such a visit would require passage through Italy, which maintains relations with the PRC. Under agreement with the Vatican, Italy permitted all guests to the funeral passage without hindrance and Chen was received at the airport in his capacity as a foreign head of state. In this religious ceremony where U.S. president George W. Bush greeted Iranian president Khatami, Chen did not seem to attempt to a high profile of himself by reaching out to other heads of states such as Bush or British prime minister Tony Blair. Chen was named one of the Time 100 for 2005.

Later in the year, Chen traveled to Miami in stopover for a forum in the Caribbean. He met with members of the U.S. Congress through video conference and was invited to visit Washington, D.C. On his way back, he was originally scheduled to fly through San Francisco. However, he changed course and stopped-over at the United Arab Emirates. The head of state greeted him and hosted a formal state dinner, infuriating the Chinese officials. Chen made his way back after making a stopover at Jakarta. His request for a pitstop at Singapore was denied; authorities cited weather problems.

On 28 February 2006, Chen announced that the National Unification Council, which was set up in 1990 to create guidelines for unification with China if it adopted democracy, would "cease to function". He took care to use this phrase rather than "abolish" because he had promised during his 2000 campaign that he would not abolish the council or its guidelines. Adam Ereli, deputy spokesman of the US State Department, issued a statement on 2 March 2006, that the understanding of the United States was that the difference between "abolish" and "ceasing activity" implied no change in the status quo.

On 3 May 2006, Chen canceled plans to pass through the United States on his way to Latin America. He was hoping to stop by either San Francisco or New York City to refuel and stay overnight, but the US refused his request instead limiting him to a brief refuelling stopover in Anchorage, Alaska, where Chen would not be allowed to step off the plane. Chen and Taiwan saw this as a snub and led to Chen's cancellation. The trip to Latin America continued, however, without a US stopover. The US State Department claimed that the Alaska stopover offer was consistent with its previous accommodations. However, former Taiwan president Lee Teng-hui was granted a visit to Cornell University eleven years earlier. More recently, in addition, Taiwan's leaders have in general been granted permission to stopover in the United States for brief periods before continuing on to other countries. This recent American stance is interpreted by Taiwan to be an expression of the increasing irritation the United States feels towards Taiwan and Chen's seemingly pro-independence gestures. Chen attended the inauguration of Óscar Arias, the president of Costa Rica, one of the few countries that recognized the Republic of China at that time. Laura Bush was also present to represent U.S. president George W. Bush. Chen seized the opportunity, approached her and shook her hands, while Chen's aide produced a camera immediately for an impromptu photo-op. Chen's supporters saw this act as a step forward in Taiwan's struggle for diplomatic recognition, while his detractors claimed that it was a grave breach of international etiquette and put Taiwan to shame.

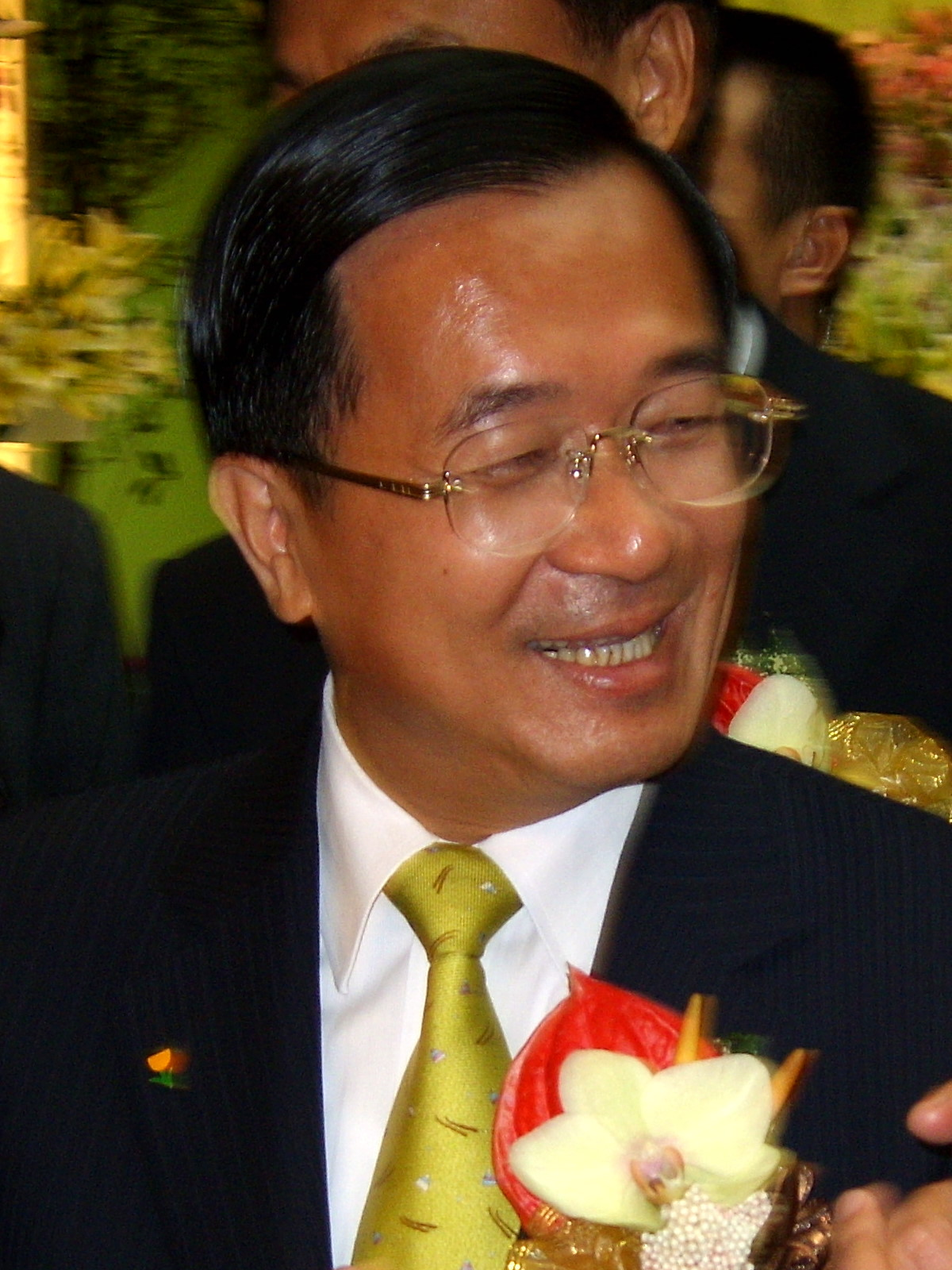
Shui-bian Chen visited 2007 Taipei International Flower Exhibition.

On 12 May 2007, Premier Su Tseng-Chang resigned his position, and Chen soon appointed Chang Chun-hsiung to fill the vacant premiership. During Chen's tenure, beginning in 2000, the country has seen six different premiers in the past seven years. During the same period of time, from 2000 onward, the Democratic Progressive Party has also seen seven different chairmen.

Chen's tenure as president expired on 20 May 2008, yielding to successor Ma Ying-Jeou. From his election to his first term to his last days as president, Chen's approval ratings fell from 79% to just 21%.

== Corruption scandals ==
In May 2006, his approval rating fell to around 20% after a series of scandals centered on his wife and son-in-law. Support for Chen had also declined among members of his own party, while former DPP chairman Shih Ming-teh, who had left the party years earlier, launched the Million Voices Against Corruption, President Chen Must Go campaign calling for his resignation. On 24 May 2006, his son-in-law, Chao Chien-ming, was taken into custody by the Taipei police on charges of insider trading and embezzlement by the opposition party. This was a setback for the Chen Shui-bian administration. In related charges, there were accusations from the opposition party that Chen Shui-bian's wife was involved in trading stocks and obtaining Pacific Sogo Department Store's gift certificates illegally in exchange for settling the disputed ownership.

On 1 June 2006, Chen declared that he was handing control of governmental matters to Premier of the Republic of China, Su Tseng-chang, and announced he would not be involved in campaigning. He also stated that he was retaining authority on matters that the constitution required him to retain authority over, presumably foreign affairs and defense policy, as well as relations with the PRC.

On 20 July 2006, opposition politicians accused that Chen had used a total of NT$10.2 million (US$310,000) worth of "fake invoices" to claim expenses after the National Audit Office found irregularities in presidential office accounts. The Taiwan High Court Prosecutors' Office investigated over this accusation. In a press release, the presidential office responded that the president assured the investigators that he did not pocket a single cent of the fund. During questioning at the presidential Office on the afternoon of 7 August 2006, the president detailed to the prosecutor how he spent the fund and presented relevant receipts and bank remittance statements.

Chen also lost a libel case brought on successfully by PFP chairman James Soong. Soong sued the president after Chen repeatedly accused him of secretly meeting the director of the People's Republic of China's Taiwan Affairs Office. Soong successfully sued Chen for NT$3 million.

On 3 November 2006, Chen's wife Wu Shu-chen and three other high-ranking officials of the Presidential Office were indicted of corruption of NT$14.8 million (US$450,000) of government funds using faked documents. Due to the protection from the constitution against prosecution of the sitting president, Chen could not be prosecuted until he left office, and he was not indicted, but was alleged to be an accomplice on his wife's indictment. The prosecutor of the case indicated that once Chen left office, his office would start the procedures to press charges against Chen. The indictment filed by prosecutors states that the indicted persons obtained government funds earmarked for secret foreign affairs, yet of six supposed secret diplomatic missions, there was sufficient evidence presented for only two. Of the remaining four, it was concluded that one did not exist, and in the case of the other three, the invoices presented were not found to be related to the secret missions.

The pan-Blue coalition, after receiving the news, demanded to call for another recall motion unless Chen resigned immediately. Another small party that backed Chen previously, Taiwan Solidarity Union, said they would likely to support the upcoming recall measure. If the recall had passed, it would have been up to the voters to decide Chen's fate in a referendum.

Leaders of the Democratic Progressive Party met together to discuss the unfavorable charges. The meeting ended when party leaders demanded Chen to explain the accusation within three days. There had long been rumblings inside the DPP that Chen has become their liability and should recall him before the presidential election. If Chen had resigned, he would have been the first Taiwanese president to step down and the vice-president, Annette Lu, would likely have taken power.

After the prosecutor announced the indictment, the campaign leader Shih proclaimed that the indictment was the historical high point in Taiwan and the month-long campaign was a success.

In a press conference 5 November 2006, Chen rebutted the charges against his wife and members of his presidential office. He said that Taiwan government offices advised him to prepare the receipts in such a fashion, and that after six years of doing so, it is strange that they would never mention an irregularity if it was not the right way to do it. He promised that all of the money actually went to diplomatic missions and did not go into any private pockets. Furthermore, he mentioned that when he took office, he thought his salary was so excessive that he cut his own salary in half, and that reduction is more than the amount he is accused of embezzling, so there is no need for him to take that money. In addition, he said that if the charges against his wife were proven in a court of law just as they were charged, then he would at that time step down as President of the Republic of China.

In defense of Chen, journalist Therese Shaheen of The Wall Street Journal Asia pointed out that controversy surrounding Chen can be in part attributed to the radical reforms he has tried to implement since stepping into power.

=== Recall motion ===
In mid-June 2006, opposition pan-blue camp lawmakers initiated a recall motion that would allow the voters to remove Chen from power via a public referendum. On 20 June, Chen addressed the nation by television, denying any involvement of the first family or himself (other than his son-in-law) in any of the alleged scandals, or "directly" accepting the department's gift certificates. The motion was not passed. Of 221 lawmakers in the legislature, all 119 pan-blue and independent legislators voted in favor of the measure, 29 votes short of the two-thirds majority needed to pass the motion. Pan-Green legislators from the president's own party, the DPP, refused to receive ballots. Pan-Green legislators from the allied TSU cast abstaining ballots. No legislator voted against the recall motion.

After Wu was indicted, the Pan-Blue parties renewed calls to recall Chen, and TSU at first indicated that it would support the recall this time, but then said it would only support the new recall motion if "concrete evidence concerning corruption is presented".

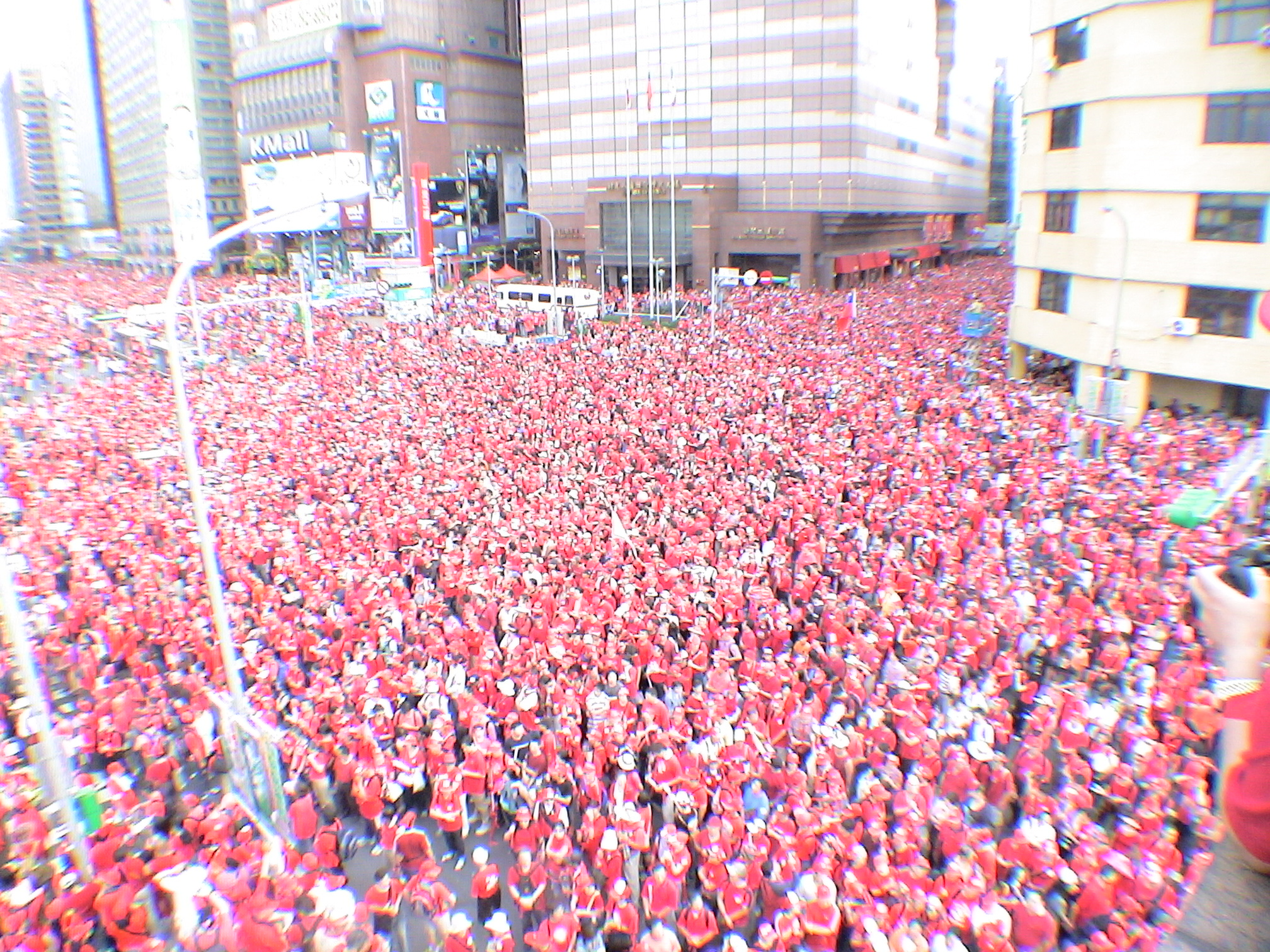
The "Besiege the Presidential Office" demonstration on 10 October 2006

On 1 September 2006, political activist Shih Ming-te launched an anti-corruption campaign. The movement accused Chen of corruption and asked for his resignation. By 7 September, more than one million signatures were collected, each with a donation of NT$100 (approximately US$3.00). On 9 September, tens of thousands of people demonstrated in the streets of Taiwan, wearing red. According to organisers, around 200,000 to 300,000 people joined the protest outside the presidential offices, but the police used aerial photography crowd counting techniques to put the number at about 90,000. Shih Ming-teh confirmed that most of his supporters are from the pan-Blue coalition in a September interview in The New York Times.

=== 2008 elections ===
In the legislative election in 2008, Chen's party suffered a clear defeat, and Chen subsequently resigned as party chairman. With Chen's resignation and Frank Hsieh's ascension as the party's new chairman, the DPP has changed chairmen seven times since Chen took office in 2000.

In the presidential election on 22 March 2008, Kuomintang candidate Ma Ying-jeou defeated DPP candidate Frank Hsieh.

== Post-presidency ==
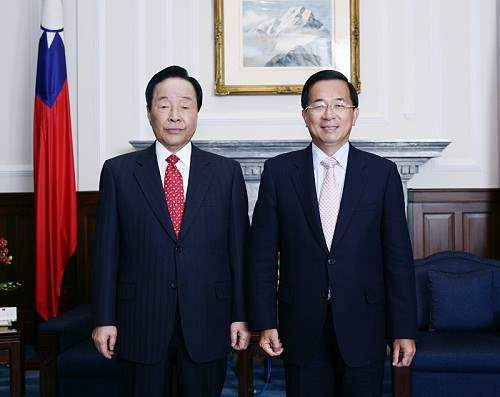
Chen (right) with former President of South Korea Kim Young-sam (2008)

Chen stepped down on 20 May 2008, the same day that Ma Ying-jeou took office as the new president of the Republic of China. No longer bearing the title of president, Chen left the Presidential Office Building, and his presidential immunity was removed. He was placed under restrictions, such as confinement to Taiwan, by prosecutors as a result of allegations of corruption and abuse of authority, both of which he was later charged guilty of. One fraud case involved the handling of a special presidential fund used to pursue Taiwan's foreign diplomacy.

President Ma Ying-jeou declassified government documents which aided the investigation into Chen's usage of special government funds. Chen's lawyers responded by suing Ma, on 6 August 2008, alleging Ma's declassification of the documents that were initially classified by Chen to be "politically motivated". The documents consisted mainly of receipts and other records of special expenses, which according to Ma's chief aide assured pose no danger to the country's interests once declassified.

After two years of investigation, it was found that Chen Shui-bian received millions from the owners of the TCC Company after the government bought the Longtan land, which was then integrated into the Science Park project. There were several other instances of corruption, which became the subject of a graft trial that also included the former president's wife and 11 other co-defendants. The trial revealed that Chen and his wife amassed a total of NT$800 million and some were laundered overseas. The former president was found guilty by the Taipei District Courts of violating Punishment of Corruption Act (貪污治罪條例), Money Laundering Control Act (洗錢防制法), and Criminal Code (刑法).

On 11 September 2009, Chen received a life sentence and was fined NT$200 million (US$6.13 million) for embezzlement, bribery and money laundering involving a total of US$15 million (NT$490 million) in funds while in office from 2000 to 2008. Supporters of Chen contended that the prosecution was politically motivated. Chen is the first ROC president to receive a prison sentence.

On 8 June 2010, the Taipei District Court found Chen not guilty of embezzling diplomatic funds. On 11 June 2010, the High Court decided to reduce Chen's life sentence to 20 years. Through several court cases and pleads for bail, the High Court rejected his request for bail and continued to detain him in jail for another 5 months. The detention led Chen's supporters to protest that the detention of Chen for more than 600 days without proving him guilty was illegal, inhumane and unjust, and a result of political revenge by the part of the Kuomintang (KMT). The Yellow Ribbon Movement took to demonstration over alleged exploitation of justice and political revenge.

Meanwhile, on 17 August 2010, both the Taipei District Court and the High Court found ex-deputy military minister, Ke Cheng-Hen (柯承亨), not guilty of revealing non-military secrets to former president Chen Shui-Bian.

The parliament with a KMT and pan-Blue coalition majority passed an amendment to the "preferential treatment for retired presidents and vice presidents act" (卸任總統副總統禮遇條例) on 19 August 2010. Introduced by the KMT, the amendment stipulated that former presidents and vice presidents will be stripped of courtesy treatment, including their monthly allowance and annual expenses, if convicted by a court of grave offense(s), such as sedition and graft. The number of bodyguards assigned to former presidents and vice presidents who are convicted of corruption in a first trial will also be reduced. Former president Chen's son stated the act was created to target the now imprisoned former president.

In July 2016, the United States Department of Justice announced it returned "approximately $1.5 million to Taiwan, the proceeds of the sale of a forfeited New York condominium and a Virginia residence that the United States alleged in its complaint were purchased with the proceeds of bribes." It also stated that Hong Kong and Swiss bank accounts, shell companies, and a St. Kitts and Nevis trust were used to launder the bribes that paid for the American properties. It was an inter-agency and international effort between the U.S. Justice Department, U.S. Immigration and Customs Enforcement's Homeland Security Investigations, and Taiwan's Supreme Prosecutors Office's Special Investigations Division.

=== Health and medical parole ===
In September 2012, Chen was admitted to Taoyuan General Hospital after complaints of having difficulty urinating, where it was concluded that he had suffered from a minor stroke. He was subsequently transferred to the Taipei Veterans General Hospital for further testing, where he was diagnosed with sleep apnea, severe depression and other cognitive disorders. His symptoms included stuttering and memory loss.

He attempted suicide on Sunday, 2 June 2013. In January 2015, Chen was released from prison on medical parole due to his ailing (but undiagnosed) condition.

His time spent under medical parole does not count toward his prison sentence. Part of the terms of his medical parole stipulate that he cannot participate in public political discussions. In January 2021, he started a radio show of non-political nature. Some people called this issue out because Chen Shui-bian appeared to be in perfect health.

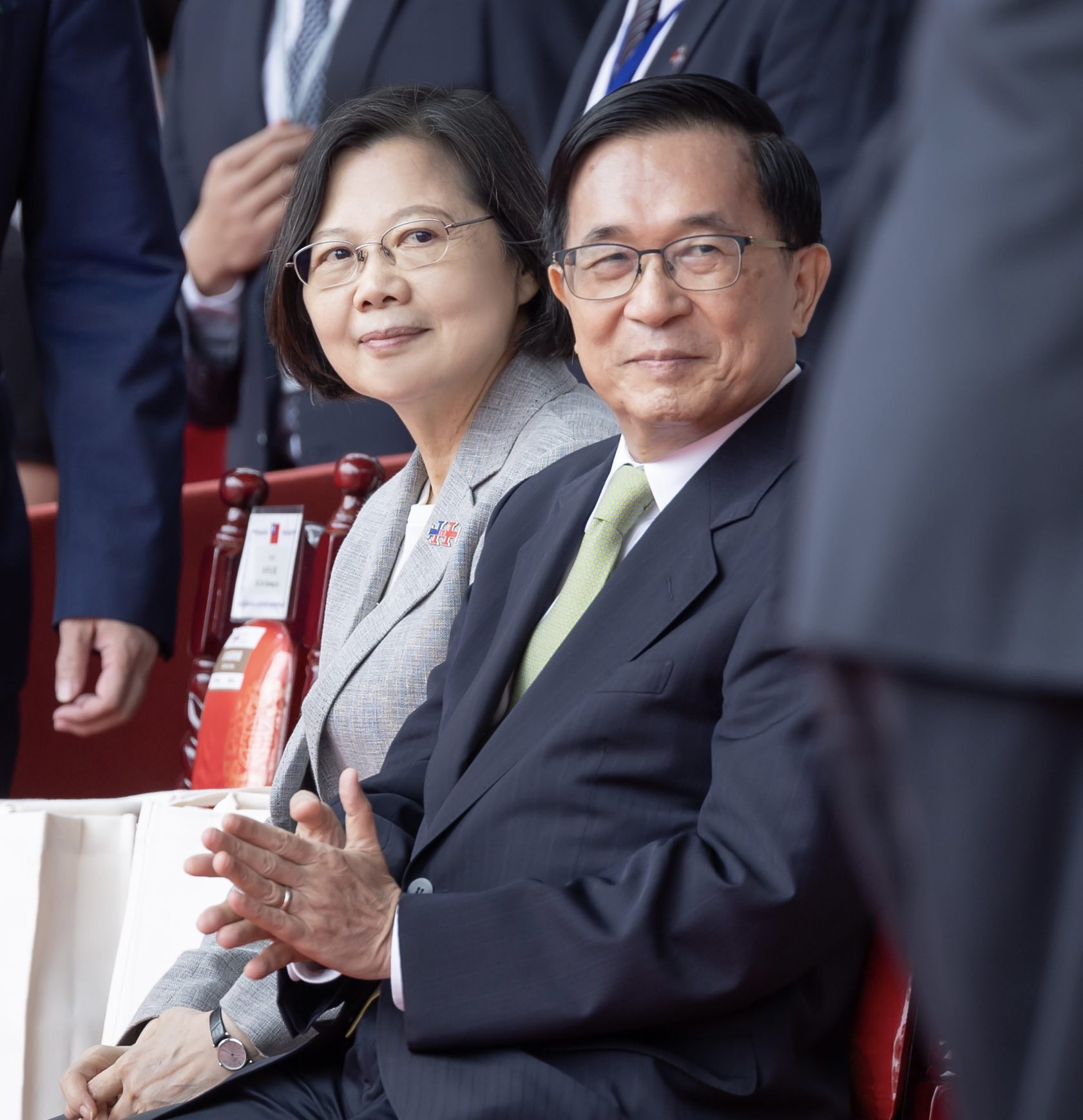
Two former DPP presidents, Chen and Tsai Ing-wen attending the 113th Double Tenth Day in 2024.

Chen currently serves as the host of a radio program.

== Position on Taiwan's political status ==
In 1999, the Democratic Progressive Party amended its charter to regard Taiwan as already independent as the ROC, and therefore it was unnecessary to declare independence. In his 2000 inauguration speech, Chen struck a more moderate tone and pledged to the Four Noes and One Without: that as long as the PRC did not intend to use military force against Taiwan, he would not declare independence, change the name of the country to "Republic of Taiwan", push for the inclusion of "special state-to-state relations" in the Constitution, or promote a referendum on independence. In addition, he pledged not to abolish the National Unification Council. However, in August 2002, frustrated by a lack of reciprocation from the PRC, he described the relationship as "one country on each side" and initiated a referendum on cross-strait relations in 2004, returning to a more confrontational stance.

In a 2007 interview with the New York Times, Chen reiterated the DPP stance that Taiwan was already independent.

Post-presidency, Chen has expressed his wishes to one day visit the village in Fujian which his ancestors migrated from in the 18th century. In 2018, Chen, along with Lee Teng-hui, expressed support for a Formosa Alliance plan to amend the referendum act to allow for a 2019 referendum on de jure independence, though neither goal was realized by the planned date.

== Honours ==
- Taiwan:
  - Grand Cordon of the Order of Brilliant Jade – (May 2001)

=== Foreign ===
- Burkina Faso:
  - Grand Cross of the Ordre de l'Étalon, formerly National Order of Burkina Faso – (August 2000)
- Chad:
  - Grand Cross of the National Order of Chad – (August 2000)
- Dominican Republic:
  - Grand Cross with Gold Breast Star of the Order of Merit of Duarte, Sánchez and Mella – (March 2001)
- El Salvador:
  - Grand Cross with Gold Star of the National Order of Doctor José Matías Delgado – (August 2004)
- Gambia:
  - Commander of the Order of the Republic of The Gambia
- Liberia:
  - Grand Cordon of the Order of the Pioneers of Liberia – (March 2001)
- Malawi:
  - Grand Commander of the Order of the Lion – (July 2002)
- Panama:
  - Extraordinary Grand Cross of the Order of Vasco Núñez de Balboa – (July 2000)
- Paraguay:
  - Grand Collar of the National Order of Merit – (June 2001)

== See also ==
- Politics of the Republic of China
- Four Wants and One Without
- Four-Stage Theory of the Republic of China
- Freedom Era Weekly
- Justice Alliance faction
