= Your Name Engraved Herein =

2020 Taiwanese romantic drama

- Promotional poster
- Chinese: 刻在你心底的名字
- Hanyu Pinyin: Kē Zài Nǐ Xīndǐ De Míngzì
- Directed by: Patrick Kuang-Hui Liu
- Written by: Chu Yu-Ning; Zhan Jie; Alcatel Wu
- Produced by: Chu Yu-Ning; Danielle Yen; Liu Zhi-Syuan; Chen Pao-Ying
- Starring: Edward Chen; Tseng Jing-Hua; Leon Dai
- Cinematography: Yao Hung-i
- Edited by: Milk Su
- Music by: Chris Hou; Jason Huang
- Production companies: Oxygen Film Studio; CMC Entertainment; Sony Pictures International Productions; Flash Forward Entertainment; Bossdom Digiinnovation; Parce Que Films; Sunnano Biotech
- Distributed by: Sony Pictures (Taiwan; theatrical); Netflix (Worldwide; OTT)
- Release date: March 2020 (Osaka Asian Film Festival)
- Running time: 114 minutes
- Country: Taiwan
- Languages: Mandarin; Taiwanese
- Box office: >NT$100 million

Your Name Engraved Herein (Chinese: 刻在你心底的名字; pinyin: Kē zài nǐ xīndǐ de míngzì; lit. 'The name engraved in your heart') is a 2020 Taiwanese romantic drama film directed by Patrick Kuang-Hui Liu and starring Edward Chen, Jing-Hua Tseng, and Leon Dai. The film premiered in Taiwan on September 30, followed by a global release on Netflix on December 23. Your Name Engraved Herein is the highest-grossing LGBTQ film in Taiwan's history, as well as the most popular Taiwanese film of 2020, ultimately becoming the first gay-themed film to exceed NT$100 million at the Taiwanese box office.

The film received five Golden Horse Award nominations, winning for Best Cinematography and Best Original Film Song.

== Synopsis ==
As martial law ends in 1987 in Taiwan, two male students, Chang Jia-han (A-han) and Wang Bo Te (Birdy), fall in love amid family pressure, homophobia, and broader social change. A new student, Birdy, arrives at an all-boys Catholic high school, where he and A-han soon become best friends; both are musicians in the school band, where they engage in antics while exchanging long glances. The school's priest and band leader, Father Oliver, reminds the students to "profiter du moment" (live in the moment), leading A-han to deepen his bond with Birdy. The two boys take a trip to Taipei—ostensibly to mourn the death of President Chiang Ching-kuo—and grow closer through their adventures in the capital. Despite mutual interest, the pair remain hesitant to act on their budding attraction. The introduction of co-educational schooling adds a wrinkle to their relationship, as the arrival of female students irrevocably transforms classroom dynamics. Birdy catches the eye of a female classmate, who offers the hope of socially-acceptable heterosexual romance, but A-han holds onto his affection for Birdy. Repeated incidents of conflict and reconciliation draw the pair together and break them apart, before fate finally takes them in different directions.

== Plot ==
Chang Jia-han (Edward Chen), nicknamed A-han, discusses a recent fight with school priest and band director Father Oliver (Fabio Grangeon). Father Oliver assumes it was over a girl that A-han likes, but A-han does not respond.

Set in Taiwan as martial law ends in 1987, Wang Po-te (Tseng Jing-Hua), nicknamed Birdy, transfers to A-han's all-boys Catholic high school and first meets him during a pool training session. One night, A-han and his friends sneak out of the dorms to meet a group of girls, but A-han fails to become erect after pairing off with one of them. Another night, A-han witnesses his friend Horn and his group bullying and assaulting a homosexual student. A-han intervenes to stop them, but the bullies try to pressure him into joining their violence, prompting Birdy to intervene himself and walk away with the boy.

After the death of President Chiang Ching-kuo, Birdy and A-han travel to Taipei to mourn on behalf of their school, and the two grow closer during their trip. They witness police violently detain a homosexual protester, Chi Chia-wei, and A-han stops an enraged Birdy from intervening. While watching the film Birdy in a video salon, A-han leans in to kiss a sleeping Birdy but is interrupted by room service. Birdy reveals his dream of becoming a filmmaker and asks A-han to attend film school with him in Taipei. The next morning, A-han has a wet dream about Birdy.

With the start of a new semester and co-education, strict rules are established to separate the sexes. Accused of homosexuality, Birdy grows closer with a female student, Wu Ruo-fei, nicknamed Ban-ban, after supporting her in a dispute against a teacher, causing A-han to be jealous. In response, Birdy asks A-han to stop trying to spend time alone with him, after which A-han goes out with a girl he previously met, who suggests he confess his feelings through a coded message on a pager. A-han sends the message to Birdy but receives no response, as Birdy is with Ban-ban.

One night, A-han helps Birdy steal a giant balloon for a prank, which turns out to be for Birdy's love confession to Ban-ban the following morning. Seeking solace, A-han meets an older man who tries to comfort him, but when the man makes a sexual advance, A-han pushes him and flees. A-han confides in Father Oliver, expressing that he would rather go to hell if it means being understood by others.

After Birdy wrecks A-han's scooter in an accident, A-han helps him shower due to his injury and also performs a handjob, with Birdy initially resisting before giving in, after which he kisses A-han. However, after Ban-ban is expelled for the love confession and Birdy is put to detention, the latter distances himself from A-han. Birdy's father arrives at the school and beats him, prompting A-han to intervene, but the situation culminates in the two boys fighting. The scene cuts to A-han's conversation with Father Oliver, who reveals his own rebellious childhood.

Learning that Birdy is at his house, A-han rushes home and nearly comes out to his parents during a heated argument with Birdy. He runs away and rides a ferry to Penghu, where the two go skinny-dipping. While lying naked on the beach, A-han kisses Birdy, who reciprocates, but afterward, they part ways. Birdy moves away to focus on his university exams and A-han calls him one last time to confess his love, playing the song Your Name Engraved Herein by Crowd Lu. Both boys break down in tears, heartbroken.

Years later, a middle-aged A-han attends his school's marching band reunion hoping to see Birdy again, but without success. He instead meets Ban-ban, now Birdy's ex-wife and the mother of his children. Ban-ban explains she and Birdy rarely see each other and states her wish that Birdy confided in her about his sexuality. A-han travels to Quebec City to visit Father Oliver's grave and meets with the priest's former lover, who reveals how Father Oliver struggled with his homosexuality and turned to religion to suppress his identity.

Still troubled, A-han unexpectedly encounters Birdy outside a bar. Birdy admits that he truly loved A-han but was unable to accept it at the time. As they walk, a younger version of A-han begins singing Your Name Engraved Herein, and a younger Birdy joins in, both watched by their older selves.

== Cast ==
- Edward Chen (陳昊森) as Chang Jia-han (張家漢) nicknamed "A-Han" (阿漢)
  - Leon Dai (戴立忍) as a middle-aged Chang Jia-han
- Jing-hua Tseng (曾敬驊) as Wang Po Te (王柏德) nicknamed "Birdy"
  - Jason Wang (王識賢) as a middle-aged Birdy
- Fabio Grangeon (法比歐) as Father Oliver
- Mimi Shao (邵奕玫) as Wu Ruo-fei (吳若非), nicknamed Ban-Ban (班班)
  - Waa Wei (魏如萱) as a middle-aged Ban-Ban

== Production ==
The film opens with a line from Song of Solomon 8:7 "Many waters cannot quench love, neither can the floods drown it", foreshadowing the tension between the protagonist's Catholic faith and his love for a fellow male student.

An homage to noted Taiwanese gay rights activist Chi Chia-wei appears in the film. While in Taipei, Birdy and A-Han see a protester on an overhead bridge, holding a sign that declares, "Homosexuality is not a disease!" Police violently detain the protester, while A-Han restrains an outraged Birdy and prevents him from intervening. The outfit, sign and protest location reflect Chi's real-life demonstrations.

The theme song "Your Name Engraved Herein", performed by singer Crowd Lu and lead actor Edward Chen, was composed by Malaysian songwriters Keon Chia (Chia Wang) and Dr. Hooi Yuan Teng (Hsu Yuan-Ting), and Singaporean lawyer Tan Boon Wah (Chen Wen-Hua). The piece won Best Original Film Song at Taiwan's Golden Horse Film Festival and Awards, the Oscars of the Chinese-speaking world. As of July 2026, the music video has garnered more than 80 million views on YouTube. This film's scene was based in Viator Catholic High School, Taichung.

The film is based on the director's true story, but in reality they never met again - as in the movie.

== Reception ==
=== Box-office ===
Your Name Engraved Herein is the highest-grossing LGBTQ film in Taiwan's history, as well as the most popular Taiwanese film of 2020, ultimately becoming the first gay-themed movie to exceed NT$100 million at the Taiwanese box office.

=== Critical response ===
On Rotten Tomatoes, a review aggregator site, the film has a rating of 90%, with an average score of 7.3/10.

Teo Bugbee of The New York Times reviewed the film, stating, "The director, Patrick Liu, has an eye for the way that physical desire manifests itself: the gestures of affection, the postures of people pretending not to acknowledge each other. He doesn’t rush the romance between the boys, and his patience allows the actors to develop believable chemistry. Though the movie could coast on the appeal of handsome faces and stolen trips to Taipei, Liu gives texture to their pretty pining."

Writing in Yahoo Lifestyle SEA, Teng Yong Ping suggests the "touching telephone call scene where Jia-han plays a love song he wrote for Birdy (the award-winning theme song) would likely turn on the waterworks for many viewers." However, Teng finds that the "heartfelt romantic storyline" is confused when "the last act of the film inexplicably fast-forwards the timeline by 30 years and transports the characters, now adult and played by Leon Dai and Jason Wang, to a current-day setting in Quebec City on the pretext of them attending the funeral of their former teacher, Father Oliver. This odd screenplay choice could be due to the film being partly funded by the Canadian government."

=== Accolades ===
The film received five Golden Horse Award nominations, winning for Best Cinematography and Best Original Film Song.

Year	Name	Category	Recipient	Result	Ref
2020	Osaka Asian Film Festival	Best Supporting Actor	Leon Dai	Won	
2020	Taipei Film Awards	Best Supporting Actor	Leon Dai	Nominated	
2020	Taipei Film Awards	Best New Performer	Edward Chen	Nominated	
2020	São Paulo International Film Festival	Best New Director	Kuang-Hui Liu	Won	
2020	Golden Horse Awards	Best Supporting Actor	Leon Dai	Nominated	
2020	Golden Horse Awards	Best New Performer	Edward Chen	Nominated	
2020	Golden Horse Awards	Best Cinematography	Yao Hongyi	Won	
2020	Golden Horse Awards	Best Original Film Score	Hou Zhijian, Huang Yuxun	Nominated	
2020	Golden Horse Awards	Best Original Film Song	"Your Name Engraved Herein" Music, Lyrics: Keon Chia (Chia Wang), Hooi Yuan Teng (Hsu Yuan-Ting), Tan Boon Wah (Chen Wen-Hua). Voice: Crowd Lu, Chen Haosen	Won	
