= All Because of Love =

- Theatrical release poster
- Chinese: 痴情男子漢
- Hanyu Pinyin: Chī Qíng Nán Zǐ Hàn
- Directed by: Lien Yi-chi
- Written by: Essay Liu; Lin Yu-chen; Lien Yi-chi
- Produced by: Chen Liang-tsai
- Starring: Kent Tsai; Dara Hanfman; Gingle Wang; Lee Ying-hung
- Cinematography: Mego Lin
- Edited by: Lin Tzu-hsien
- Music by: Owen Wang
- Production companies: T-Lang Cultural & Creative Entertainment
- Distributed by: Activator Marketing Company
- Release date: August 18, 2017
- Running time: 114 minutes
- Country: Taiwan
- Language: Mandarin
- Box office: NT$14 million (Taiwan)

All Because of Love is a 2017 Taiwanese romance film directed by Lien Yi-chi, starring Kent Tsai, Dara Hanfman, Gingle Wang and Lee Ying-hung. It was released in theaters on August 18, 2017.

== Premise ==
Er-kan, a high school student who is in love with the most beautiful girl in the class, has to endure continuous abuse from the bullies in school. However, when the girl of his dreams becomes the girlfriend of the leader of the bullies, things can only get worse from there.

== Cast ==
- Kent Tsai as Chen Er-kan
- Dara Hanfman as Tseng Hsin-er
- Gingle Wang as Hung Man-li

=== Special appearance ===
- Hsu Hsiao-shun as Chen Yu-li, Er-kan's grandpa
- Lee Ying-hung as Andy
- Monster as Chen Chu, Er-kan's father
- Cheryl Yang as Tan-meng, Er-kan's mother

=== Cameo appearance ===
- Peng Chia-chia as Chen Yu-li's friend
- Miao Ke-li as Man-li's mother
- Bamboo Chen as Man-li's father
- Kuo Shu-yao as Hsu Kan-tien, Er-kan's grandma (young)
- Emerson Tsai as Chen Yu-li (young)
- Tsai Tsan-te as Tseng Mei-jen, Hsin-er's mother
- Fabio Grangeon as Matt, Hsin-er's father
- Alien Huang as Hung Ti-so, Man-li's brother
- Huang Fei as Hsu Kan-tien (middle-aged)
- Bebe Chang as Hsiao-yu
- Leo Wang as Cupid
- Lyn Wang as Michiko

== Soundtrack ==
All Because Of Love (CD + DVD)

Soundtrack album by Hanfman Dara
- Released: August 2, 2017
- Genre: Film soundtrack
- Label: Hove

No.	Title	Writer(s)	Performer	Length
1.	"Listen and See 看得見寂寞"	Hans Zhang, Skippy Lu	Dara Hanfman	4:58
2.	"Listen and See (Music) 看得見寂寞(音樂)"	Hans Zhang		4:58

== Awards and nominations ==
Award	Category	Recipients	Result
54th Golden Horse Awards	Best New Performer	Kent Tsai	Nominated
