= Fabio Grangeon =

French actor based in Taiwan (born 1989)

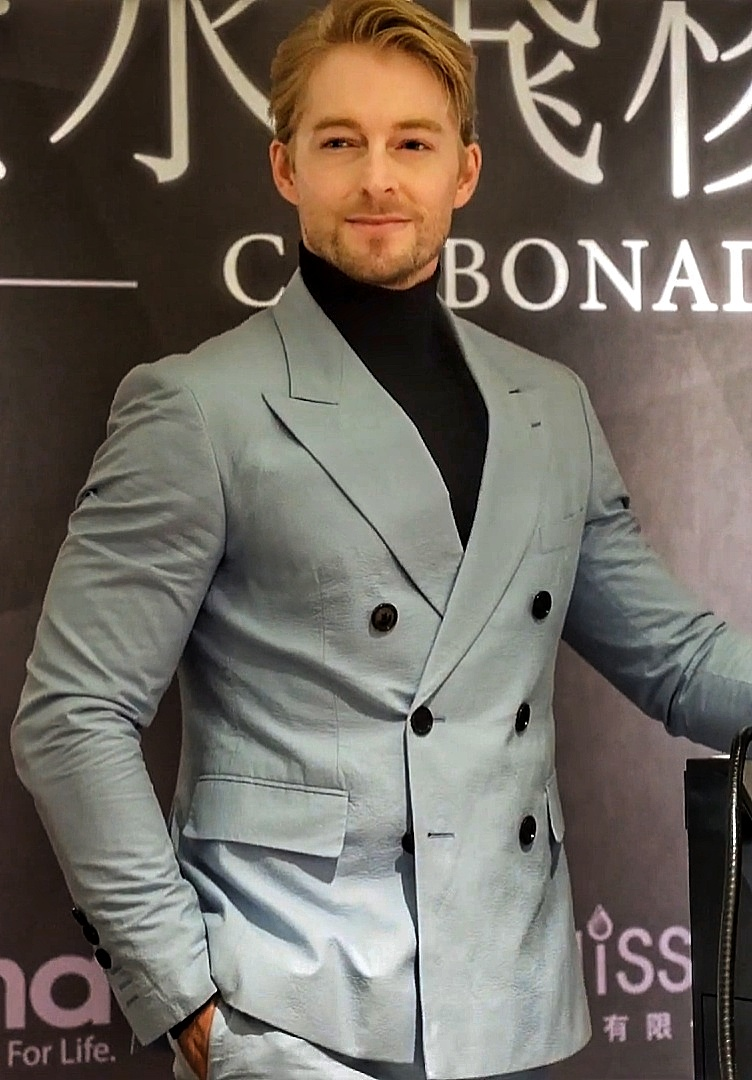
- Grangeon in October 2020
- Born: Fabio Julien Victor Grangeon; 27 January 1989 (age 37); Toulouse, France
- Education: Toulouse III - Paul Sabatier University
- Occupation: Actor
- Years active: 2014–present
- Spouse: Desiree Wu (m. 2021)

Fabio Julien Victor Grangeon (born 27 January 1989) is a French actor based in Taiwan best known for portraying Father Oliver in the romance film Your Name Engraved Herein (2020) and Charles Le Gendre in the historical drama series Seqalu: Formosa 1867 (2021).

== Early life and education ==
Grangeon was born on 27 January 1989, in Toulouse, France. Since his parents have a strong passion for travel, he had been residing in different countries in the Caribbean since childhood and attending various schools. Grangeon attended Toulouse III - Paul Sabatier University to study international commerce in 2010 and worked part-time as a model during his university years. In 2010, Grangeon went on exchange at Ming Chuan University for nine months to learn more about Asian culture. He completed his bachelor's degree and briefly took acting classes in Paris after returning to France. However, he became reminisced with the life in Taiwan and returned to Taiwan shortly afterwards.

== Career ==
After returning to Taiwan, Grangeon began to work as a freelance model and joined EBC's talk show Half and Half as one of the hosts in 2014. He began to receive public attention with the show and was invited to co-host several other EBC television programs in the following year. Grangeon also appeared in the 2017 romance film All Because of Love and starred in a main role in the 2019 romance film When Green Turns to Gold.

In 2020, Grangeon was cast in a supporting lead role in the homosexual-themed romance film Your Name Engraved Herein. He portrayed a French-Canadian priest who was hesitated to bless the young gay couple's relationship and garnered public renown with the role. Grangeon landed his first major television role as Charles Le Gendre, a French-born American diplomat who was tasked to investigate the Rover incident, in the 2021 historical drama series Seqalu: Formosa 1867. To prepare for the role, Grangeon gained 8 kg of weight and lost 5 kg of fat. He also did research on the history of nineteenth century Taiwan, in order to authentically portray the historical figure.

== Personal life ==
Grangeon became engaged to Desiree Wu in August 2020, and married in late 2021. Their daughter was born in November 2022.

== Filmography ==
=== Film ===
| Year | Title | Role | Notes |
|---|---|---|---|
| 2017 | All Because of Love | Matt | |
| 2019 | When Green Turns to Gold | Leon | |
| 2020 | Your Name Engraved Herein | Father Oliver | |
| TBA | A Promise To Keep † | TBA | |

=== Television ===
| Year | Title | Role | Notes |
|---|---|---|---|
| 2021 | Seqalu: Formosa 1867 | Charles Le Gendre | Main role |
