= Four Wants and One Without =

2007 policy proposed by Chen Shui-bian

- Traditional Chinese: 四要一沒有
- Simplified Chinese: 四要一没有
Transcriptions
Standard Mandarin
- Hanyu Pinyin: sì yào yī méiyǒu
- Wade–Giles: ssu⁴ yao⁴ i¹ mei²-yu³
- Tongyong Pinyin: sìh yào yi méi-yǒu

Four Wants and One Without or Four Yeses and One No (Chinese: 四要一沒有) is a policy proposed by the then-president of Taiwan, Chen Shui-bian, in a speech at a function of the Formosan Association for Public Affairs on 4 March 2007. The substance thereof is that:

- Taiwan wants independence;
- Taiwan wants the rectification of its name;
- Taiwan wants a new constitution;
- Taiwan wants development; and
- Taiwanese politics is without the question of left or right, but only the question of unification or independence.

== See also ==
- Four Ifs
- Four Noes and One Without
