= Huang Fei =

Taiwanese singer

- 黃妃
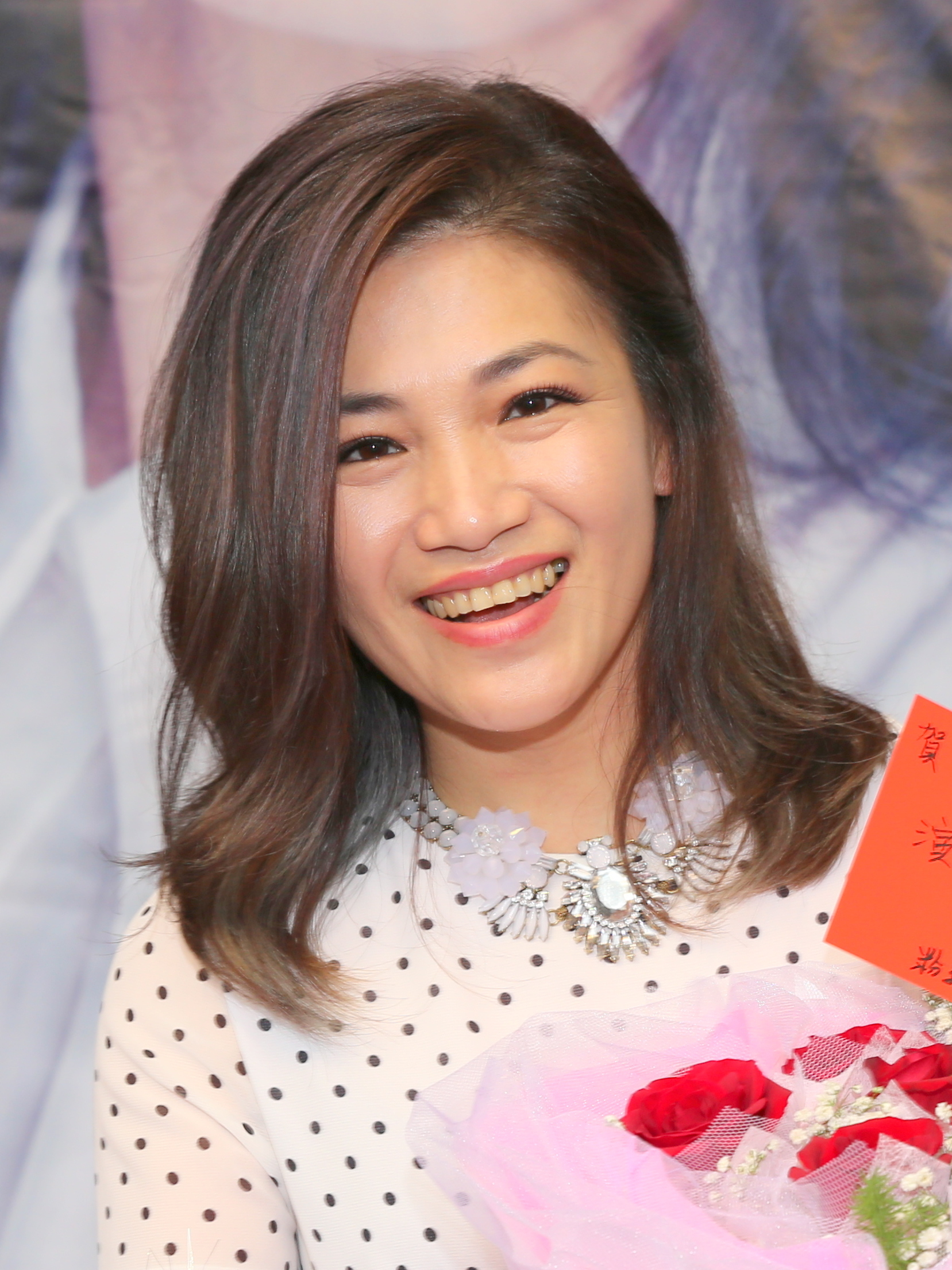
- Huang Fei (2017)
- Born: 13 July 1974 (age 51); Gushan, Kaohsiung
- Occupations: Singer, songwriter
- Awards: Golden Melody Awards – Best Taiwanese Female Singer; 2011, 2016
- Musical career
- Origin: Taiwan
- Genres: Hokkien pop

Chinese name
- Traditional Chinese: 黃妃
Transcriptions
Standard Mandarin
- Hanyu Pinyin: Huáng Fēi
Southern Min
- Hokkien POJ: N̂g Hui
- Tâi-lô: N̂g Hui

Huang Fei (Chinese: 黃妃; Pe̍h-ōe-jī: N̂g Hui; born 13 July 1974) is a Taiwanese Hokkien pop singer.

She is known for folk music, and has won the Golden Melody Award for best Taiwanese female singer three times, in 2011, 2016, and 2024.

== Selected filmography ==
=== Film ===
Year	English title	Original title	Role	Notes
2017	All Because of Love	痴情男子漢	Hsu Kan-tien	Cameo appearance
