= Taipei Detention Center, Agency of Corrections, Ministry of Justice =

Taiwanese Detention Center

Coordinates: 24°59′10″N 121°27′41″E

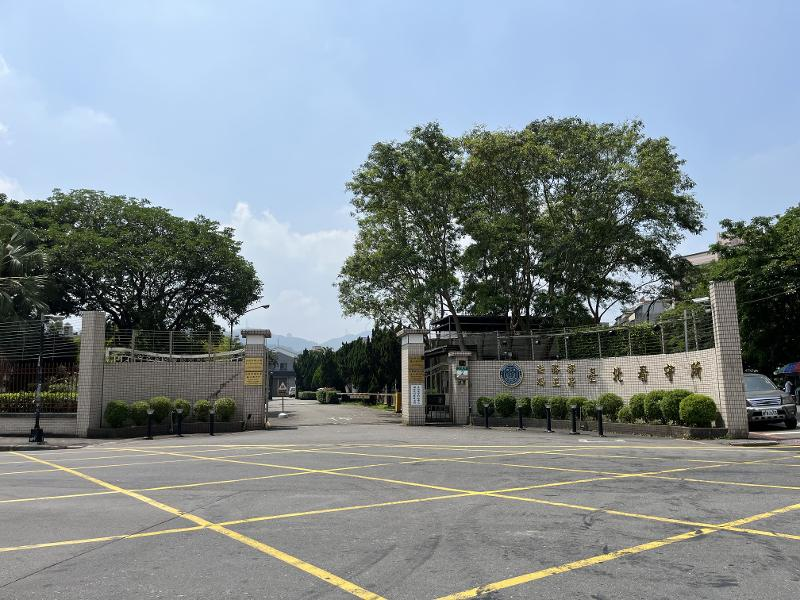

Taipei Detention Center, Agency of Corrections, Ministry of Justice (Chinese: 法務部矯正署臺北看守所; pinyin: Fǎwù bù jiǎozhèng shǔ táiběi kānshǒu; Pe̍h-ōe-jī: Tâi-oân Tâi-pak Khàn-siú-só͘ ), commonly known as the Tucheng Detention Center, (Chinese: 土城看守所; pinyin: Tǔ chéng kānshǒusuǒ) is a prison in Taiwan. On 1 July 1952, after the Taiwan Taipei Detention Center was separated from the Taiwan Taipei Prison, its official name changed to "Detention Center of the Taipei District Court, Taiwan". In 1975, it was relocated to Tucheng District, New Taipei City. Many political prisoners were held here and it became known as the "First Lockup Under Heaven."

== Notable detainees ==
- Chi Chia-wei, LGBT rights activist, was incarcerated here for approximately 6 months in 1986 after he requested that the Legislative Yuan allow him to marry his boyfriend.
- Chen Shui-bian, future president of Taiwan, was detained here in 1986 as a political prisoner. He also referred to detention center as the Bastille, and asked for his grandchildren to be told he had gone to Robben Island.
