= Four Ifs =

Preconditions on Taiwan independence

The Four Ifs are a set of preconditions developed by Chen Shui-bian clarifying and tempering the stance of Taiwan's Democratic Progressive Party (DPP) regarding independence for the island. They were developed in 1988 by Chen, under the Kuomintang administration of Lee Teng-hui. They indicate events which, if occurred, would cause the DPP to immediately advocate for independence for Taiwan.

They are:

- If the Kuomintang unilaterally holds talks with the Chinese Communists;
- If the Kuomintang sold out the interests of the people of Taiwan;
- If the Chinese communists annexed Taiwan;
- If the Kuomintang did not implement true constitutional democracy.

== Effect on Taiwan independence movement ==
As the second-largest political party in Taiwan, the DPP is the most prominent pro-independence force on the island (the Kuomintang's position is historically that of Chinese unification under a republican government, though it has become ambivalent). As an illegal opposition party in its early years, DPP's push for Taiwan independence was a main focus of its contrast to the ruling party; since its legitimacy and coming to power as an established party, it has tempered its push for independence.

Former president Lee and estranged politician James Soong and their followers broke ranks with the Kuomintang shortly after the coming to power of the DPP, having positioned themselves as supporters of Taiwan independence. This split led to the formation of the Taiwan Solidarity Union, which unlike the modern DPP, actively advocates Taiwan independence. The TSU has attracted former members of the DPP dissatisfied with that party's increased distance from the independence movement.

== See also ==
- Pan-Green Coalition
- Four Wants and One Without
