= Chi Chia-wei =

Taiwanese gay rights activist

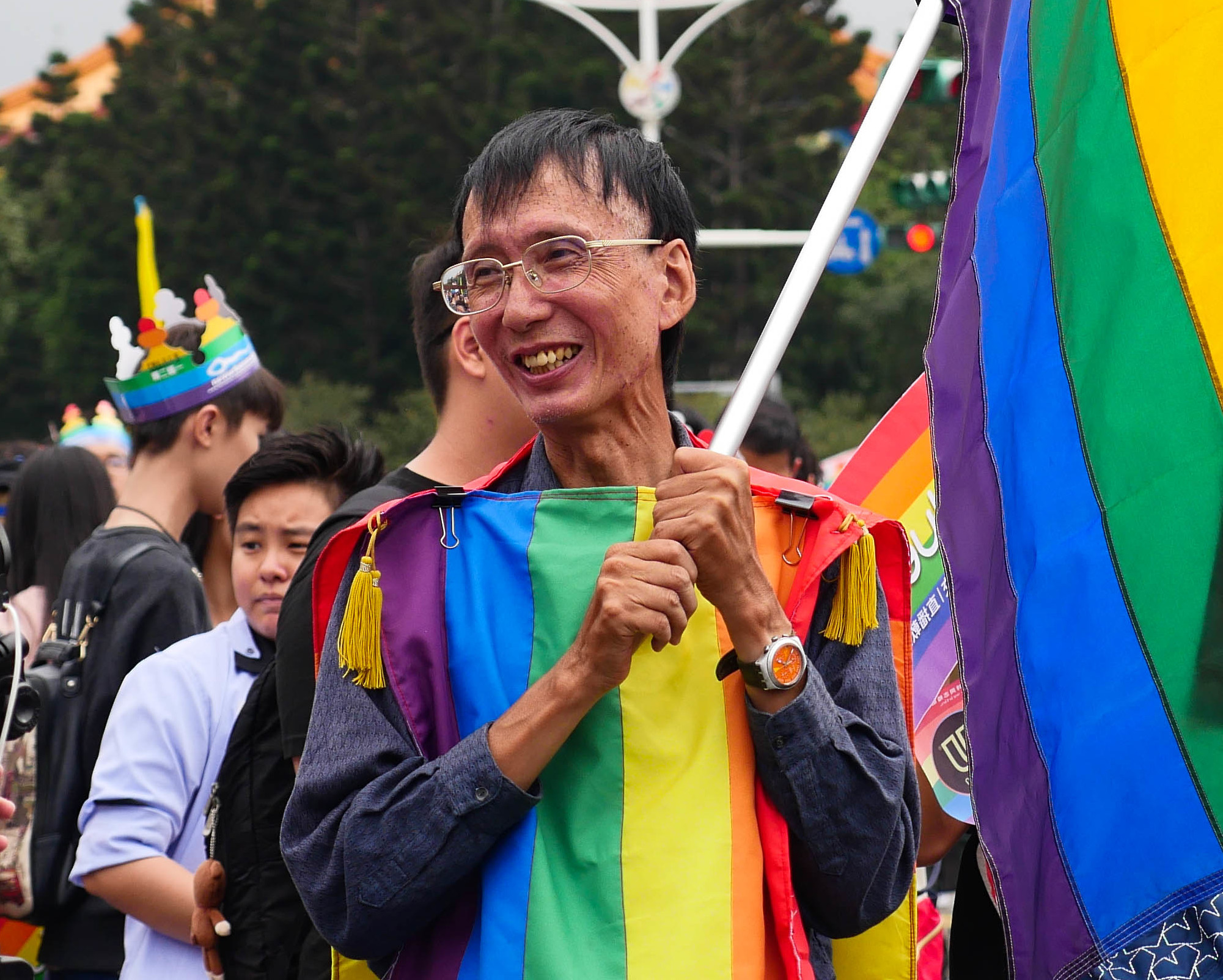
- Chi during Taiwan Pride 2016
- Born: 2 August 1958 (age 67); Taiwan

Chinese name
- Chinese: 祁家威
Transcriptions
Standard Mandarin
- Hanyu Pinyin: Qí Jiāwēi
Yue: Cantonese
- Jyutping: Kei^{4} Gaa^{1}-wai^{1}

Chi Chia-wei (Chinese: 祁家威; born 2 August 1958) is a Taiwanese gay rights activist.

In 2020, he was included on Time's list of the 100 most influential people in the world.

== Activism ==
In March 1986, Chi became the first person in Taiwan to come out as gay on national television, organizing a press conference to announce both his sexuality and his launch of a campaign to prevent the spread of AIDS/HIV.

Chi also advocated for recognition of same-sex unions. In 1986, Chi applied to the Taipei District Court notary office with a request for a notarized marriage license, which was promptly rejected; his appeal to the Legislative Yuan was also rejected in harsh terms. Soon afterward, on 15 August, he was detained by police with being involved with a robbery, which he denied. Sentenced to a five-year sentence, he was imprisoned for 162 days that year, after which he was subsequently pardoned by a judge and freed. His imprisonment was customary of political dissidents of the late White Terror period, which ended the next year. He was detained at the Tucheng Detention Center and was kept in a room with 4 other political prisoners including Chen Shui-bian, future president of the Republic of China (Taiwan). The other 3 prisoners all had wives who sent food into prison, which was divided equally between the 4 of them.

After meeting his current partner in 1988, Chi worked as the country's only AIDS/HIV activist, operating a halfway house for HIV and AIDS patients and advocating for safer sex among the country's LGBT community. In 2000, he achieved controversy in the Taiwanese LGBT community when he struck a deal with a local credit company to hire people with AIDS to work as debt collectors, which campaigners condemned as exploitative to endangered people.

After the Ministry of Justice ruled as only allowed for opposite-sex couples in 1994, Chi attempted to obtain a license again in 1998, eventually appealing the case in October 2000 to the Council of Grand Justice to offer a justification for their refusal to grant him a marriage license. A judge on the panel rejected his appeal due to the appeal not specifying the existing laws and regulations inconsistent with the Constitution.

On 21 March 2013, he once more applied for a license; when he was denied, he appealed upward to the Taipei City Government's Department of Civil Affairs, who referred the constitutionality question to the Taipei Higher Administrative Court and then the Supreme Administrative Court in 2015. Both Chi and the Department requested a constitutional interpretation on the issue and asked the court to focus on whether Taiwan's Civil Code should allow same-sex marriage and if not, whether that violates articles under the Constitution of the Republic of China pertaining to equality and the freedom to marry. On 24 May 2017, the Constitutional Court ruled in Interpretation No. 748 that the Civil Code's restriction of marriage is unconstitutional, and ruled that same-sex couples will be allowed to marry on or before 24 May 2019.

== Media ==
In the Taiwanese film Your Name Engraved Herein, the director pays homage to Chi, a character based upon him can be seen wearing the famous costume partly made of condoms and holding a sign stating "homosexuality is not a disease". The production team spoke to Chi before including this scene.
