= M-shaped society =

M-Form Society is a term that describes the demographic distribution of wealth in a society in which the statistical curve appears roughly in the form the letter "M". The term was first used in the writings of William Ouchi - "The M-Form Society: How American Teamwork Can Recapture the Competitive Edge." Subsequently in 2006, it was used again by the Japanese economist and corporate strategist Kenichi Ohmae (大前研一) in his work. According to his observation, Ohmae argued that the structure of Japanese society has emerged into a 'M-shape' distribution. It refers to a polarized society with the extreme rich and the extreme poor.

== See also ==
- William Ouchi
- Income gap
- Income distribution
- Social mobility
- Middle class
- Unemployment
