= Su Chiu-cheng =

Taiwanese politician (1935–1998)

Su Chiu-cheng (Chinese: 蘇秋鎮; 1935–1998) was a Taiwanese politician. Until 1972, he was a practicing lawyer. Su was affiliated with the tangwai movement throughout his political career, and served as a member of the Legislative Yuan between 1981 and 1984.

== Career ==
Su practiced rights law until he was convicted of embezzlement and disbarred in 1972. He became involved in politics as a legal consultant for political candidates affiliated with the tangwai movement. Su worked for Yu Teng-fa before participating in the 1979 Kaohsiung incident. He came to the attention of the Taiwan Garrison Command during the demonstrations, and was subsequently arrested. Su was released on bail and permitted to campaign for a legislative seat during the 1980 elections. He won a seat on the Legislative Yuan representing Kaohsiung. The seventh issue of Mingjen, a tangwai-affiliated magazine, was banned in October 1982, partly because it had covered a press conference attended by Su in Tokyo. In 1983, Su questioned interior minister Lin Yang-kang about the lifting of martial law in Taiwan. Su supported a number of legislative candidates during the 1986 election cycle, all of whom lost their bids for political office.
