= Edward Chen (actor) =

Taiwanese actor and singer

- 陳昊森
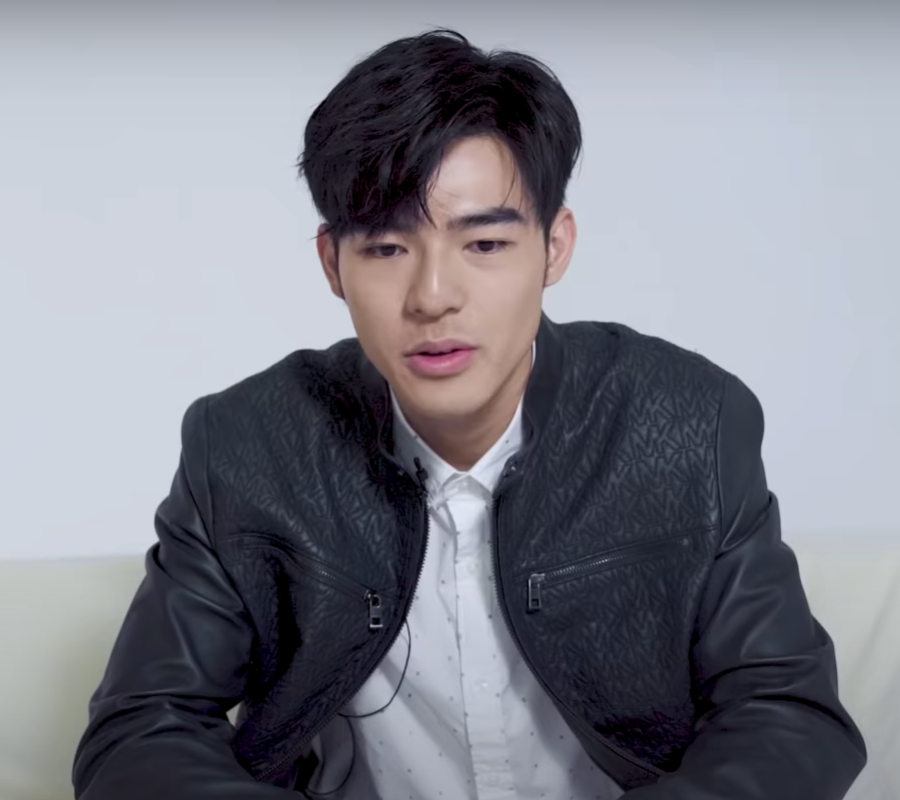
- Chen in November 2020
- Born: Chen Shi-cheng; 2 August 1996 (age 30); Taichung, Taiwan
- Education: Hsing Wu University (BFA)
- Occupations: Actor; singer

Chinese name
- Traditional Chinese: 陳昊森
- Simplified Chinese: 陈昊森
Transcriptions
Standard Mandarin
- Hanyu Pinyin: Chén Hàosēn
Southern Min
- Hokkien POJ: Tân Hō-sim

Edward Chen Hao-sen (Chinese: 陳昊森; pinyin: Chén Hàosēn; Pe̍h-ōe-jī: Tân Hō-sim; born 2 August 1996) is a Taiwanese actor and singer. He is known for his roles in the 2017 drama series Red Balloon and the 2020 feature film Your Name Engraved Herein. For his role in Your Name Engraved Herein, Chen was nominated for Best New Performer at the 57th Golden Horse Awards.

== Education ==
Chen graduated from Hsing Wu University with a bachelor's degree in performing arts.

== Career ==
Chen was born as Chen Shi-cheng (Chinese: 陳世承; Pe̍h-ōe-jī: Tân Sè-sêng). He is known for his roles in LGBT-themed productions, notably the 2017 series Red Balloon and the 2020 film Your Name Engraved Herein. In 2020, he signed a recording contract with Huayan Music and recorded the theme song for Your Name Engraved Herein.

When asked if he was reluctant to be typecast in queer roles, Chen said: "The role settings in the scripts are very different. If I classify these characters into the same ethnic group, of course everyone in this ethnic group is still different. Personality, different backgrounds, and different stories. The trick for me is actually to let go of myself, completely believe in the events that the character does, and then study and establish it."

== Filmography ==
=== Film ===
Year	Title	Role	Notes
2017	Youth (青春熱血之東北插班生)	Zhang Wen-feng	
2018	Gatao 2: The New Leader Rising (zh)	Liu Jian (adolescent)	Cameo
2019	Bad Boy Symphony (zh)	Xiaolong	Cameo
2020	Your Name Engraved Herein	Chang Jia-han	
2022	The Post-Truth World	Chang Cheng-yi	
2023	Scamsgiving	Jason	
2023	Love at First Lie	Edward Kwan	
2024	Kids	Chang Rung	
2025	The One	Tong Mingsheng	
2026	Crossing A Dawn	Chen Yuzhou	

=== Television series ===
Year	Title	Role	Notes/Ref.
2017	Red Balloon (zh)	Xia Zhi-chen (teenager)	
2018	Mermaid Sauna (zh)	Qi Fan-da/Hua Xiang-rong	
2021	Who Killed the Good Man (zh)	He Shuo-yi	
2021	Rainless Love in a Godless Land	Saowac	Guest role
2022	Lesson in Love (zh)	Zhang Yi-xiang	
2023	What the Hell is Love	Li Guan-jun	Guest role
2024	In Between	Luo Ma	
2024	Snowy Night Timeless Love	Tong / Ming Jie	
2025	The First Frost	Su Haoan	
TBA	One Day in July	Shi San	

== Discography ==
=== Studio albums ===
Title	Details
Almost Human	Released: November 9, 2023; Label: HIM; Format: CD, digital download, streaming

=== Singles ===
==== As lead artist ====
Title	Year	Album
"Your Name Engraved Herein"	2020	Almost Human
"Hidden Pain"	2022	Almost Human
"Aloof"	2023	Almost Human
"Lion of the Sun"	2023	Almost Human

==== Promotional singles ====
Title	Year	Album
"Moonlight in the City" (as a member of HIM Family)	2021	Non-album single

== Awards and nominations ==
Year	Award	Category	Production	Result
2020	2020 Taipei Film Awards (zh)	Best New Performer	Your Name Engraved Herein	Nominated
2020	57th Golden Horse Awards	Best New Performer	Your Name Engraved Herein	Nominated
2020	57th Golden Horse Awards	Best Original Song	"Your Name Engraved Herein" (zh)	Won
2021	2nd Taiwan Film Critics Society Awards	Best Original Song	"Your Name Engraved Herein" (zh)	Nominated
2021	12th Annual Festival of Youth Film Awards	Best Actor	Your Name Engraved Herein	Nominated
