= Crowd Lu =

Taiwanese singer, songwriter and actor

- 盧廣仲
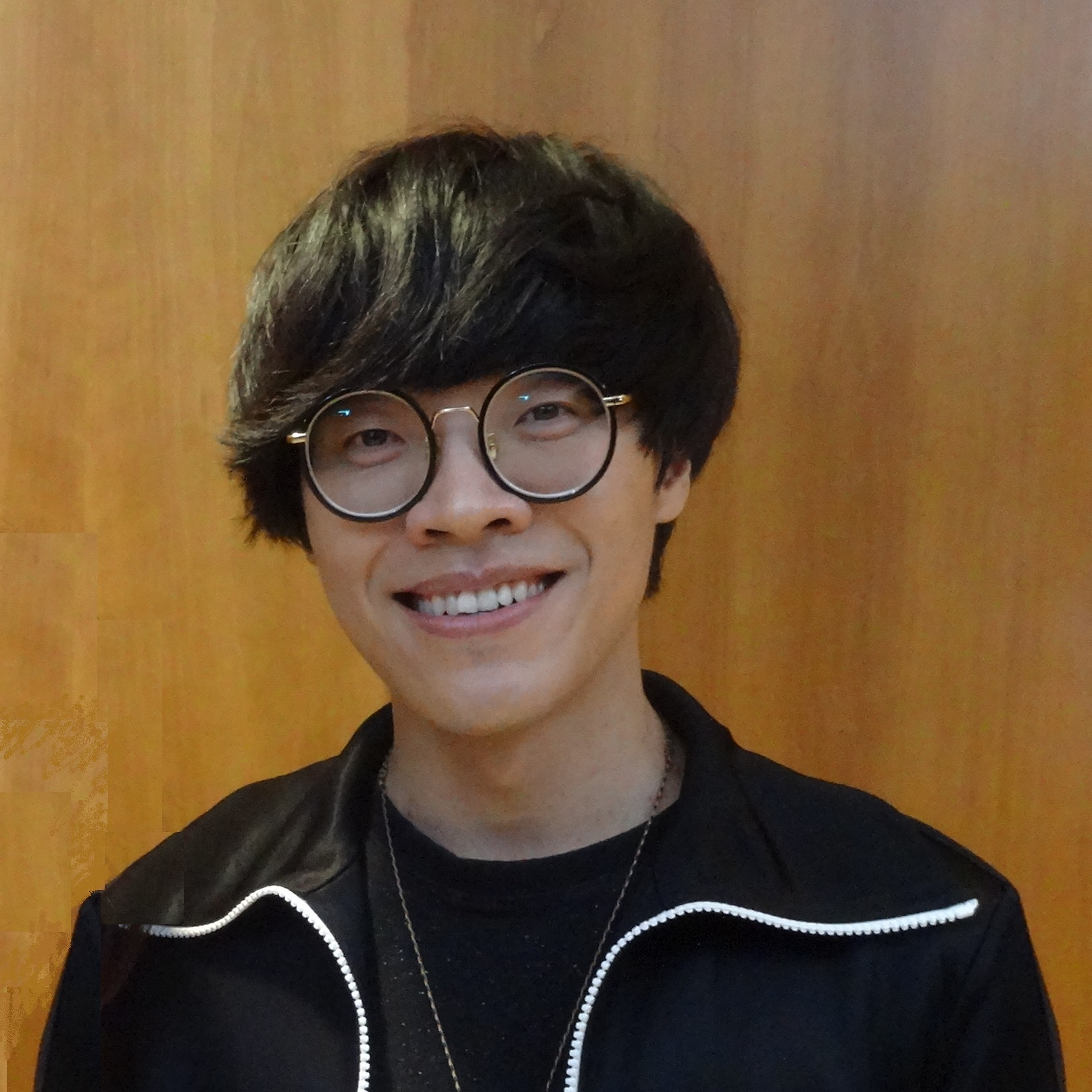
- Lu in 2018
- Born: 15 July 1985 (age 41); Tainan, Taiwan
- Education: Tamkang University
- Occupations: Singer, songwriter, actor
- Years active: 2007–present
- Awards: Golden Melody Awards – 20th Best New Artist; Best Composer 2009
- Musical career
- Also known as: Lu Kuang-chung; Lu Guangzhong
- Genres: Acoustic, mandopop, rock and roll
- Instruments: Vocals, guitar

Chinese name
- Traditional Chinese: 盧廣仲
- Simplified Chinese: 卢广仲
Transcriptions
Standard Mandarin
- Hanyu Pinyin: Lú Guǎngzhòng
- Wade–Giles: Lu^{2} Kuang^{3}-chung^{4}
Southern Min
- Hokkien POJ: Lô͘ Kóng-tiōng

Crowd Lu Kuang-chung (Chinese: 盧廣仲; born 15 July 1985) is a Taiwanese singer, songwriter and actor. He is also nicknamed "Vitas Lu" after making a parody of the song Opera No. 2 by the Russian singer Vitas, having the ability to hit the same high notes. Due to a serious car accident in his first year at Tamkang University, Lu learned to play guitar during his hospitalization. The following year, Lu won first prize for musical composition and solo performance and proceeded to once again take the gold in composition and become the crowd favorite at National Chengchi University.

In 2009, Lu won Best New Artist and Best Composer at the 20th Golden Melody Awards.

== Early life ==
Lu was born in Tainan, Taiwan. His mother was a collector of Western jazz records.

After graduating from the Tainan Guangming High School in 2003, Lu moved north to Taipei to attend Tamkang University. Although he intended on majoring in electrical engineering, due to his near fatal car accident, Lu was forced to switch his major to Spanish literature.

== Career ==
In his first year at Tamkang University, Lu was run over by a bus and suffered severe injuries in both legs. As a result, Lu spent months in the hospital, during which he picked up the guitar and experimented with musical composition. The following year, Lu won first prize for musical composition and solo performance at a Tamkang University singing contest and proceeded to once again take the gold in composition and to become the crowd favorite at a similar contest at National Chengchi University. Lu caught the eye, and ears, of prominent music record producer Zhong Cheng Hu, and, with Zhong, produced three singles. Of them, "Good Morning, Beautiful Dawn!" appeared on the Taiwan Musical Society's Top Ten Singles in 2007. By mere word of mouth, Lu sold 15,000 CD's of his singles.

On 23 August 2008, Lu had his own first official concert, only 88 days after his hit CD came out.

In 2009, Lu's albums Seven Days (七天) and Live in Taipei International Convention Center (TICC) were both awarded one of the Top 10 Selling Mandarin Albums of the Year at the 2009 IFPI Hong Kong Album Sales Awards, presented by the Hong Kong branch of IFPI.

Lu performed the theme song of the film Your Name Engraved Herein, the piece won Best Original Film Song at Taiwan's Golden Horse Film Festival and Awards.

== Discography ==
=== Studio albums ===
Title	Album details	Track listing
100 Ways of Living 一百種生活	Released: 27 May 2008; Label: Team Ear Music; Formats: CD, digital download	Track listing: 1. 早安, 晨之美!; 2. Que te pasa 你在幹嘛?; 3. 一百種生活; 4. PAZ; 5. 好想要揮霍; 6. 別殺我; 7. Boring; 8. 我愛你; 9. 無敵鐵金剛; 10. 校園美女2008; 11. 寂寞考; 12. 破氣球 (When I Fall in Love)
Seven Days 七天	Released: 30 October 2009; Label: Team Ear Music; Formats: CD, digital download	Track listing: 1. OH YEAH!!!; 2. 七天; 3. Tomato; 4. 愛情習作; 5. I No; 6. 開心餐廳; 7. 吉米寶貝; 8. 風雨; 9. A 10. 最寂寞的時候; 11. 聽見了嗎?; 12. 再見勾勾
Slow Soul 慢靈魂	Released: 15 July 2011; Label: Team Ear Music; Formats: CD, digital download	Track listing: 1. 別在我睡著的時候打電話給我; 2. 慢靈魂; 3. 港邊男兒; 4. 不想去遠方; 5. 就像白癡一樣; 6. 蚊子; 7. 藍寶; 8. 再見了, 阿法迪斯; 9. After Dinner; 10. 梅西好朋友; 11. 壞掉了
Guitar 有吉他的流行歌曲	Released: 20 November 2012; Label: Team Ear Music; Formats: CD, digital download	Track listing: 1. 調音; 2. 有吉他的流行歌曲; 3. 口水流下來; 4. jam 1; 5. 只有夜來香; 6. 歐拉拉呼呼; 7. jam 2; 8. 把我踢開; 9. 燃燒卡洛里; 10. 校園歌手; 11. jam 3; 12. 一個便當; 13. 清晨巴士
What a Folk !!!!!!	Released: 14 June 2016; Label: Team Ear Music; Formats: CD, digital download	Track listing: 1. Happy Chakra; 2. 一坪半 (4.95m^{2} Dream); 3. 手機仔(一) (Smart Phone I); 4. 夏天的歌 (Song of Summer); 5. 月光備忘錄 (Moonlight Note); 6. 今天睡在這裡 (Sleep Here Tonight); 7. 善良的眼鏡 (Kind Glasses); 8. 手機仔(二) (Smart Phone II); 9. 結婚鑽戒 (Wedding Ring); 10. 星座愛情故事之巨蟹座可不可以繼續說愛 (June & July); 11. 一定要相信自己 (Trust Myself)
healism 勵志論	Released: 08 December 2021; Label: Team Ear Music; Formats: CD, digital download	Track listing: 1. Intro; 2. 勵志論 (C'MON); 3. 自我的介紹 (in peace); 4. 雨時多雲偶陣晴 (uWEATHER); 5. 狂迪 (Crazy Disco); 6. 像你 (There You Are); 7. 肌肉的記憶 (MySoulMemory); 8. 輕輕 (iRipple); 9. 冒煙的燈泡 (ASK Yin Yang); 10. 明年 (Let Go); 11. 英雄 (Heroes)
HeartBreakFast 傷心早餐店	Released: 07 September 2025; Label: Team Ear Music	Track listing: 1. Sleepless Night; 2. After Us; 3. Whisper; 4. Love Lost; 5. lost you twice 6. Sun & Earth; 7. All Fool's Day; 8. Aaaaahhhhh; 9. Farewell Love Song; 10. Match Point

== Filmography ==
=== Television series ===
Year	English title	Mandarin title	Role	Notes
2017	Q Series: A Boy Named Flora A	植劇場-花甲男孩轉大人	Cheng Hua-chia / Cheng Shuang	

=== Film ===
Year	English title	Mandarin title	Role	Notes
2013	Campus Confidential	愛情無全順	Otaku	
2014	Big Hero 6	大英雄天團	Baymax	Voice, Taiwanese version
2016	Hang in There, Kids!	只要我長大	Backpacker	
2018	Back to the Good Times	花甲大人轉男孩	Cheng Hua-chia / Cheng Shuang	
2023	Kiss My A*s Boss	他馬克老闆	Mark	

== Awards and nominations ==
Year	Award	Category	Nominated work	Result
2009	20th Golden Melody Awards	Best Composer	"100 Ways of Living"	Won
2009	20th Golden Melody Awards	Best New Artist	100 Ways of Living	Won
2009	20th Golden Melody Awards	Best Arrangement	"Good Morning, Beautiful Dawn!"	Nominated
2009	20th Golden Melody Awards	Song of the Year	"100 Ways of Living"	Nominated
2009	20th Golden Melody Awards	Pop Album Of The Year	100 Ways of Living	Nominated
2017	28th Golden Melody Awards	Best Male Vocalist – Mandarin	What a Folk!!!!!	Nominated
2018	29th Golden Melody Awards	Song of the Year	He-R	Won
2018	29th Golden Melody Awards	Best Composer	He-R	Won
2018	53rd Golden Bell Awards	Best Leading Actor in a Television Series	A Boy Named Flora A	Won
2018	53rd Golden Bell Awards	Best Newcomer in a Television Series	A Boy Named Flora A	Won
2020	57th Golden Horse Awards	Best Original Film Song	Your Name Engraved Herein	Won
2020	32nd Golden Melody Awards	Song of the Year	Your Name Engraved Herein	Won
2022	33rd Golden Melody Awards	Best Composer	"uWEATHER"	Nominated
2022	33rd Golden Melody Awards	Best Music Arrangement	"Crazy Disco"	Nominated
2022	33rd Golden Melody Awards	Best Male Mandarin Singer	healism	Nominated
