= List of Taiwanese dramas from 2011 to 2020 =

This is a list of Taiwanese dramas since 2011.

== 2011 to 2020 ==
=== 2011 ===
First Air Date	Network(s)	Title	Cast	Episodes	Note(s)/Ref(s)
February 13	CTV	幸福最晴天; Sunny Happiness	Janine Chang, Mike He	16	
March 20	FTV	愛讓我們在一起; Love together	Chunya Chao, Ye Jia Yu, Chang Chia-Hui, Kurt Chou	13	
April 10	CTS	飛行少年; They Are Flying	Sam Wang, Pets Tseng, Chris Wang, Linda Liao	25	
April 12	CTS	艋舺燿輝; Monga Yao Hui	Lee Wei, Lin Yi Xin	73	Lee Wang Luo was nominated for Best Supporting Actor in 2011 at the 46th Golden Bell Awards
April 17	TTV; SETTV	醉後決定愛上你; Love You	Joseph Chang, Rainie Yang, Hsu Wei-ning, Alien Huang, Kingone Wang, Tom Price	18	
April 22	TTV 年代MUCH台	我的完美男人; Who's The One	Tien Hsin, Weber Yang, Pink Yang, Johnny Lu	13	
April 22	FTV	新兵日記之特戰英雄; Rookies' Diary		22	
June 5	CTV; GTV	美樂。加油; Love Keeps Going	Cyndi Wang, Mike He, Eli Shih	13	
June 13	CTS; NTV; STV	拜金女王; Material Queen	Vanness Wu, Lynn Hung, Daniel Chan, Jessie Chiang, Harry Chang, Annie Chen	22	
June 19	FTV; GTV	旋風管家; Hayate the Combat Butler	George Hu, Park Shin-hye, Tia Lee	13	
July 11	CTV	我和我的兄弟·恩; I, My Brother	Emma Wu, Chen Shu-Fang, Thomas Guo	21	
July 11; July 29	HiHD; CTV	珍愛林北; Lin Bei	Alien Huang, Michelle Chen, Chu Ke-liang	20; 13	
August 4	TTV; GTV	陽光天使; Sunny Girl	Wu Chun, Rainie Yang	22	
August 5	CTS	歡迎愛光臨; That love comes	Joe Cheng, Monica Li, Emma Pei	9	
August 16	CTV	男女生了沒; Boy and Girl	Genie Chuo, Michael Zhang, Matt Wu, Jocelyn Wang	23	
September 4	CTV	料理情人夢; Love Recipe	Kenji Wu, Li Jia Ying, Emma Wu (Gui Gui), Rhydian Vaughan	10	
August 21; August 27	TTV; SETTV	小資女孩向前衝; Office Girls	Roy Chiu, Ko Chia-yen, James Wen, Tia Lee, Janel Tsai, Kuo Shu-yao, Patrick Lee	25	
September 16; September 18	TTV; SETTV	勇士們; Soldier		15	
September 17	PTS	愛在桐花紛飛時; Tong Flowers Love	Xiu Jie Kai, Evonne Hsu, Liang Jing Wen, Danny Liang	20	
September 18	FTV; GTV	我可能...不會愛你; In Time with You	Ariel Lin, Bolin Chen, Sunny Wang, Andrea Chen	13	Won several awards on the 47th Golden Bell Awards including Best Actress (Ariel Lin); Best Actor (Bolin Chen); and Best Television Series
September 27	CTV; CTi	記得·我們有約; Remember, About Us	Ken Chu, Michelle Chen, Matt Wu, Maggie Wu, Chang Fu-chien	18	
September 29	HiHD	單數絕配; Odd Perfect Match	Godfrey Gao, Alice Tzeng, Shawn Chen, Maggie Wu	21	
October 2	CTS; ETTV	真心請按兩次鈴; Ring Ring Bell	Peter Ho, Janine Chang, Tracy Deng, Xiu Jie Kai, Serena Fang, Peggy Tseng	15	
October 28	CTV; NTV	真的漢子; Next Heroes	Lin Yo-Wei, Megan Lai, Johnny Lu, Kingone Wang, Hope Lin	17	
October 31	CTS; HiHD	門當父不對; Laoba Jiadao	Ma Ju-Lung, Pei Hsiao-Lan, Joanne Tseng, Gao Ming, Ling Xiao-Su	17	
December 18	FTV; GTV	華麗的挑戰; Skip Beat!	Choi Siwon, Lee Donghae, Ivy Chen	15	
October 28	SET Taiwan	愛。回來; Way Back Into Love	June Tsai, Ray Chang, Wu Ya Ruo, Lung Shao-hua	22	
December 13	SETTV	真愛找麻煩; Inborn Pair	Annie Chen, Chris Wang	84	
December 30	TTV	前男友; Ex-boyfriend	Tony Yang, Lee Chien-na, Jerry Huang, Liao Yi Chiao	14	

=== 2012 ===
First Air Date	Network(s)	Title	Cast	Episodes	Note(s)/Ref(s)
January 15	CTS; ETTV	粉愛粉愛你; I Love You So Much	Lan Cheng-lung, Li Jia Ying, Nick Chou, Mao Di, Tom Prince	16	
January 23	CTV; AHTV	幸福三顆星; Happy Michelin Kitchen	Lan Cheng-lung, Cheryl Yang, Li Jin Ming, Wu Jian Fei, Ying Er, Li Zhi Nan	32	
January 27	CTS	溫柔的慈悲; Gentle Mercy	Tender Huang, Ivelyn Lee, Stella, Xie Wen Xuan, Zhang Ming Ming, Yang Zishan	15	
February 19	TTV; SETTV	向前走向愛走; Love Forward	Amber Kuo, Tammy Chen, Tony Yang, Weber Yang	22	
February 24	CTV; STARTV	翻糖花園; Fondant Garden	Park Jung-min, Jian Man Shu, Kingone Wang, Lia Lee	16	
February 24	GMA7; STARTV	Cedy in love with Laurice		16	
February	CTV	愛啊哎呀，我願意！ Ia Ia, I Do	Dylan Kuo, Tammy Chen, Song Min Yu, Reyizha Alimjan, Xu Yue	15	
April 6 April 14	TTV; Much TV	半熟戀人; In Between	Johnny Lu, Janel Tsai, Darren Qiu, Vivi Lee	15	
April 8	FTV; GTV	絕對達令; Absolute Darling	Ku Hye-sun, Jiro Wang, Penny Xie	13	
April 10	SETTV	愛上巧克力; Ti Amo Chocolate	Vanness Wu, Joanne Tseng, Michael Zhang, Prince Chiu, Hsueh Shih-ling, Kuo Shu-yao	80	
May 20	CTS	給愛麗絲的奇蹟; Alice In Wondercity	Aaron Yan, Lara Veronin	15	
July 14	FTV; GTV	原來愛·就是甜蜜; Once Upon a Love	Sunny Wang, Cheryl Yang	14	
July 20	TTV; Much TV	花是愛; What Is Love	Wu Kang-ren, Jade Chou, Duncan Chow, Kimi Hsia	15	
July 22; July 28	TTV; SETTV	螺絲小姐要出嫁; Miss Rose	Megan Lai, Roy Chiu, Paul Hsu, Tia Lee, Zhao Jun Ya, Puff Kuo	23	
July 31	SET Metro	剩女保鏢; Sweet Sweet Bodyguard	Alien Huang, Summer Meng	80	
October 14; October 20	CTV; CTi Variety	白色之戀; Die Sterntaler	Rhydian Vaughan, Nikki Hsieh, Sphinx Ting, Reen Yu, Alex To	18	
October 14; October 20	FTV; GTV	S.O.P女王; The Queen of SOP	Joe Chen, Godfrey Gao	15	
October 31	FTV; GTV	戀夏38°C; Summer Fever	George Hu, Gui Gui	30	
October	FTV	神龍傳說之天龍雙驕; Dragon Legend	Chen Ya Lan, Li Xuan Rong, Yang Huai Min	80	
November 1	SETTV	真愛趁現在; Love, Now	Annie Chen, George Hu	72	
November 8	SETTV	我租了一個情人; Love Me or Leave Me	Chris Wang, Hsu Wei-ning	16	
November 16; November 18	TTV; GTV	罪美麗; An Innocent Mistake	Mo Zi Yi, Wang Shih-hsien, Lin Chen Xi, Pan Yi Jun	16	
November 19	Disney Channel (International)	課間好時光一年二班; As the Bell Rings	Fandy Fan, Ami Yang, Katie Chen, J.C.		Season 2
November 20	NTV Variety	回家; Home	Vic Chou, Wang Xueqi, Janine Chang	33	
November 20	NTV Variety	東華春理髮廳; Dong-Huachun Barbershop	Johnny Liu, Liu Yue, Figaro Tseng, Yang Yazhu	40	
November 27	SETTV	愛情女僕; Lady Maid Maid	Nicholas Teo, Reen Yu, Janel Tsai, Danny Liang, Katherine Wang	67	
December 26	GTV Variety Show	終極一班2; KO One Return	Jiro Wang, Pets Tseng, SpeXial	30	

=== 2013 ===
First Air Date	Network(s)	Title	Cast	Episodes	Note(s)/Ref(s)
January 6 January 12; January 13	TTV; SET Metro; ETTV Drama	金大花的華麗冒險; King Flower	James Wen, Nikki Xie, Wu Kang-ren, Hsueh Shih-ling	21	
January 27; February 2	FTV; GTV Variety	美人龍湯; Spring Love	Mike He, Lin Ying-zhen	14	
February 24	CTS	K歌·情人·夢; K Song Lover	Evonne Hsu, Van Fan, Nicholas Teo, Angel Chen, Mini Tsai, Gabriel Lan	13	
February 28; March 1 March 1	TTV; SET Metro; ETTV Variety	大紅帽與小野狼; Big Red Riding Hood	Yao Yuanhao, Cheryl Yang	16	
March 2	NTV Variety	惡男日記; Bad Boys' Diary	Chang Shu-hao, Jenna Wang	14	
March 3 March 9	CTV; CTi Variety	借用一下你的愛; Borrow Your Love	Dylan Kuo, Amanda Chu	14	
March 6	SET Metro; ETTV Variety	美味的想念; A Hint of You	Michael Zhang, Lee Chien-na, Jay Shih	68	
March 8	TTV	遇見幸福300天; Happy 300 Days	Tammy Chen, Kingone Wang, Ken Xie, Kaiser Chuang	15	
March 8 March 9	CTV; TVBS Entertainment Channel	求愛365; True Love 365	Joanne Tseng, Ray Chang, Queenie Tai, Johnny Lu	20	
March 26	TVBS Entertainment Channel	姐姐立正向前走; Drama Go! Go! Go!	Ruby Lin, Jiro Wang, Lin Gengxin	30	
March 26	SET Metro; ETTV Variety	兩個爸爸; Two Fathers	Weber Yang, Lin Yo-wei, Megan Lai	73	
March 29	SET Taiwan	含笑食堂; Flavor of Life	Lung Shao-hua, Miao Ke-li, Lü Hsueh-feng	25	
April 8	NTV Variety	幸福蒲公英; Happy Dandelion	Danson Tang, Alice Tzeng, Shao Xiang, Lene Lai	40	
May 12; May 18	FTV; GTV Variety	原來是美男; Fabulous Boys	Jiro Wang, Lyan Cheng, Hwang In-deok, Evan Yo	13	
May 25	PTS	沒有名字的甜點店; Amour et Pâtisserie	Sandrine Pinna, Jasper Liu, Jiekai Siou, Debbie Huang	14	
June 9	CTS	我愛幸運七; Lucky Touch	Calvin Chen, Mini Tsai, Lia Lee, Double Chao	14	
June 9 June 15	CTV; CTi Variety	愛情急整室; Love SOS	Daniel Chan, Jian Man Shu, Patrick Li, Amber An	13	
June 9 June 15; June 16	TTV; SET Metro; ETTV Drama	真愛黑白配; Love Around	Annie Chen, George Hu	21	
June 21; June 22	SET Metro; ETTV Variety	就是要你愛上我; Just You	Puff Kuo, Aaron Yan	21	
June 28; June 30	TTV; GTV Variety	親愛的，我愛上別人了; A Good Wife	Tien Hsin, Christopher Lee, Shara Lin, Darren Chiu	15	
July 5	GTV Variety	終極一班3; KO One Re-act	Jiro Wang, Pets Tseng, SpeXial	20	
July 20	CTi Variety	PMAM; PMAM	Jiekai Siou, Judy Chou	40	
July 23	SET Metro; ETTV Variety	幸福選擇題; Second Life	Penny Xie, Cyndi Wang, Jiekai Siou, Pink Yang	70	
July 26; July 27	CTV; TVBS Entertainment Channel	飛越·龍門客棧; Dragon Gate	Timimi Chen, Ko Chia-yen, Sunny Wang, Melvin Sia	15	
August 11; August 17	FTV; GTV Variety	我愛你愛你愛我; IUUI	Jasper Liu, Chloe Wang	13	
September 8 September 14; September 21	CTV; CTi Variety; ETTV Drama	女王的誕生; The Queen!	Suen Yiu-wai, Cheryl Yang, Janel Tsai, Johnny Lu, Nita Lei	22	
September 8	CTS	金牌老爸; Golden Dad	Chu Chung-heng, Fang Fang, Ge Wei-ru	26	
September 20	SET Taiwan	孤戀花; White Magnolia	Angel Han, Josh Huo, Vins Yi-Zheng, Francesca Kao	23	
October 11; October 12	TTV; GTV Variety	愛的生存之道; The Pursuit of Happiness	Sonia Sui, Tony Yang, Kaiser Chuang, Aggie Xie	13	
October 29	SET Metro; ETTV Variety	有愛1家人; Love Family	Chris Wang, Serena Fang, Jack Lee, Amanda Chou	72	
November 3 November 9 November 10	TTV; SET Metro; ETTV Drama	回到愛以前; Déjà Vu	Mandy Wei, Yao Yuanhao, Jenna Wang	22	
November 10	FTV	愛情ATM; Love For All The Moments	Sphinx Ting, Esther Liu, Jason Tsou, Fabien Yang, Serena Fang	13	
November 15; November 16	SET Metro; ETTV Drama	我的自由年代; In a Good Way	Lego Lee, Lorene Ren, Jay Shih, TzyMann Weng	26	
November 15; November 16	CTV; TVBS Entertainment Channel	媽，親一下！ Kiss Me Mom!	Alan Ko, Kimi Hsia, Danny Liang, Evan Yo, Lily Pan	15	
November 19; November 19; November 23	TTV; NTV Variety; Much TV	結婚好嗎？ Marry or Not	Tien Hsin, Jiekai Siou, Shao Xiang, Ann Wei-ling	40	
November 25	STAR Chinese Channel	幸福街第3號出口; Three Exits to Love	Bobby Dou, Vivi Lee, Yao Yuanhao	25	

=== 2014 ===
First Air Date	Network(s)	Title	Cast	Episodes	Note(s)/Ref(s)
January 10; January 11	TTV; GTV Variety	流氓蛋糕店; CHOCOLAT	Lan Cheng-lung, Masami Nagasawa, Ma Ju-Lung	15	
January 28	TTV; NTV Variety; Much TV	神仙·老師·狗; Teacher GangStar	Weber Yang, Angela Li, Chloe Wang	30	
February 9 February 16	FTV; ETTV Drama	真愛配方; First Kiss	Owodog, Nick Chou, Shara Lin, Mandy Wei	16	
February 11	SET Metro; ETTV Variety	女人30情定水舞間; Fabulous 30	Vivi Lee, Jennifer Hong, Darren, Danson Tang, Albee Huang	76	
March 7	SET Taiwan	熱海戀歌; Once Upon a Time in Beitou	Lee Lee-zen, Lee Chien-na, Yūta Hiraoka, Joelle Lu	23	
March 16; March 22	CTS; TVBS	A咖的路; Rock N' Road	Wu Kang-ren, Kimi Hsia, Mike Lee, Nita Lei	16	
March 16	HiHD	白袍下的高跟鞋; High Heels And A Scalpel	Tender Huang, Megan Lai	6	Mini series
April 6 April 12; April 13	TTV; SET Metro; ETTV Drama	愛上兩個我; Fall In Love With Me	Aaron Yan, Tia Lee, Jack Lee, Katherine Wang, Beatrice Fang	20	
April 9	Hakka TV	三隻小蟲; Three Bugs	Huang Shu-wei, Li Ying-hong, Ariane Wang, Hu Xiao-fang	20	
April 18	CTS	巷弄裡的那家書店; Lovestore at the Corner	Lee Wei, Nikki Hsieh, Alien Huang, Chloe Wang, Tracy Chou	25	
April 25; April 26	TTV; GTV Variety	威廉王子; Prince William	Hsieh Kunda, Andrea Chen, Jason Tsou, Ariel Ann	14	
May 23; May 24	SET Metro; ETTV	喜歡·一個人; Pleasantly Surprised	Puff Kuo, Jasper Liu, Lene Lai, Jolin Chien	22	
May 28	SETTV; ETTV Variety	媽咪的男朋友; Tie The Knot	Cheryl Yang, Nylon Chen, Kingone Wang, Mandy Tao, Steven Sun	70	
June 1 June 6	FTV; GTV Variety	你照亮我星球; You Light Up My Star	Joe Cheng, Janine Chang, Summer Meng, David Chiu	20	
June 15; June 21	CTV; CTi Entertainment	勇敢說出我愛你; Say I Love You	Mike He, Ko Chia-yen, Ella Wilkins, Lin Mei-hsiu, Chang Chin-lan	16	
June 23; June 24	GTV Variety; CTV	終極X宿舍; THE X-DORMITORY	Pauline Lan, Emily Tsai, Wes (SpeXial), Wayne Huang, Sunnie Huang	40	
July 19	PTS; TVBS	16個夏天; The Way We Were	Ruby Lin, Weber Yang, Hsu Wei-ning, Melvin Sia, Jason Tsou	16	
August 8 August 9	TTV; GTV Variety	妹妹; Apple in Your Eye	Lan Cheng-lung, Amber An, Christina Mok, Ahn Zhe	13	
August 15	SET Taiwan	阿母; Our Mother	Fang Wen-lin, Wang Hao, Sun Shu-may, Duan Jun Hao, Hwang Weng-Sing, Margaret Wang, Gao Meng Jie	25	
August 23	CTV; GTV Variety	上流俗女; My Pig Lady	Ady An, Mike He, Shin, Zhang Xianzi, Fu Xinbo	14	Aired in mainland China under the title Go, Single Lady 真愛遇到他
August 24; August 30; August 31	TTV; SET Metro; ETTV Drama	再說一次我願意; Say Again Yes I Do	Lin Yo-Wei, Mandy Wei, Michael Chang, Vivi Lee	20	
September 3	SETTV; ETTV	幸福兌換券; Love Cheque Charge	George Hu, Phoebe Yuan, KunDa Hsieh	74	
October 5 October 11	CTV; CTi	謊言遊戲; The Lying Game	Ella Chen, Wu Kang-ren, Vivi Lee, Lawrence Ko	13	
October 24; October 25	SETTV; ETTV	22K夢想高飛; Aim High	Lego Lee, Chris Wang, Summer Meng, Kuo Shu-yao	20	
November 7 November 8	TTV; GTV	徵婚啟事; Mr. Right Wanted	Sonia Sui, Christopher Lee, Jerry Huang, Hans Chung, Kuo Shu-yao	20	
November 22	GTV Variety	終極惡女; Angel 'N' Devil	Simon Lian, Sylvia Wang, Teddy, Cosmos (A'N'D), Lucia (A'N'D), Ting (A'N'D), Allie (A'N'D), Sunnee (A'N'D), Wes, Wayne Huang	26	
December 6	TVBS; CTV	俏摩女搶頭婚; Boysitter	Annie Chen, River Huang, Melvin Sia, Nita Lei, Yang Qing, Gao Shan Feng	15	
December 16	SETTV; ETTV	我的寶貝四千金; Dear Mom	Jennifer Hong, Joanne Tseng, Albee Huang, Beatrice Fang, Shiou Chieh Kai, Melvin Sia, Duncan Chow, Jack Lee	84	

=== 2015 ===
First Air Date	Network(s)	Title	Cast	Episodes	Note(s)/Ref(s)
January 4 January 10	CTV; CTi	鋼鐵之心; Heart Of Steel	Alan Ko, Phoebe Yuan, Darren, Andrea Chen	15	
January 11; January 17	TTV; SETTV	聽見幸福; Someone Like You	Kingone Wang, Lorene Ren, Wei-lian, Katie Chen	20	
January 16; January 17	TTV; GTV	新世界; The New World	Zhang Ting Hu, Yang Ko-han, Penber Pan, Mini Tsai, Angela Lee	15	
February 6 February 7	SET Taiwan; GTV One	珍珠人生; Life of Pearl	Yang Ko-han, Norman Chen	22	
February 8	FTV	星座愛情牡羊女; Aries	Xiu Jie Kai, Janet Hsieh, Patrick Lee, Chloe Wang, Sabrina Pai	10	
March 20; March 21	SETTV; ETTV	莫非，这就是爱情; Murphy's Law of Love	Danson Tang, Ivelyn Lee, Jolin Chien, Jenna Wang	19	
March 24; April 4	PTS HD; PTS	我的15分鐘; Be Famous For 15 Minutes	Hong Ling Xiang, Sylvia Hsieh, Li Cheng Bin, Yang Ko-han, Hsiao Hung Jen	6	
March 30	Hakka TV; CTV HD	出境事務所; Long Day's Journey into Light	Wu Kang-ren, Huang Peijia, Crystal Lin, Ryan Kuo, Qiu De Yang, Ko Shu-chin, Hsieh Chiung-Hsuan, Yang Zong Hua	20	
March 30	CTV; CTi	武媚娘傳奇; The Empress of China	Fan Bingbing, Zhang Fengyi, Aarif Rahman	84	
April 5 April 11	CTV; CTi	超級大英雄; The Crossing Hero	Jiro Wang, Nikki Hsieh, Lorene Ren, Hu Yang, Bruce Xie	28	
April 11	CTV	鑑識英雄; Crime Scene Investigation Center	Wang Shih-hsien, Kurt Chou, Janel Tsai, Mini Tsai, Teresa Daley, Soda Voyu, Tao Chuag Chen	13	season 1
April 14	SETTV; ETTV	好想談戀愛; Be With You	Bobby Dou, Huang Peijia, Nylon Chen, Vivi Lee	72	
April 19; April 25	FTV; ETTV	星座愛情獅子女; Leo	Ko Chia-yen, Tender Huang, Yao Yi Ti, Tom Price	9	
April 25	PTS	麻醉風暴; Wake Up	Jag Huang, Hsu Wei-ning, Wu Kang-ren, Kerr Hsu	6	
May 1 May 2	TTV; TVBS	哇！陳怡君; Youth Power	Tammy Chen, Yao Yuanhao, Lee Chien-na, Tsou Cheng-En, Tsai Chen-nan, Hank Wu, Dawen	21	
May 7	TTV	春梅; Haru	Allison Lin, Junior Han, Darren Chiu, Yankee Yang, Jenna Wang, Patrick Lee	54	
May 31; June 6	TTV; SETTV	他看她的第2眼; When I See You Again	Jasper Liu, Mandy Wei, Jet Chao, Ivy Shao	20	
June 6	PTS; STAR Chinese Channel	長不大的爸爸; Baby Daddy	Chang Shu-hao, Lee Chia-Ying, Nylon Chen, Aggie, Lin Mei-tsao	20	
June 21; June 27	FTV; ETTV	星座愛情雙魚女; Pisces	Mini Tsai, Hsieh Kunda, Ray Chang, Zaizai Lin	10	
July 4	Hakka TV; PTS HD	落日; Sunset	Zhu Lu Hao, Shan Cheng Jun, Joanne Deng, Vince Gao, Zhang Shu-Wei, Jackson Lou	13	
July 10; July 11	SET Taiwan; GTV One	思慕的人; An Adopted Daughter	Ikeya Chen, Angus Hsieh, Lee Yi	15	
July 19; July 25	CTV; CTi	失去你的那一天; The Day I Lost U	Kingone Wang, Lee Chien-na, Christina Mok, Gu Bin, Andy Chen, Jozie Lu	15	
July 22	TTV	天若有情; If God Loves	Tender Huang, Angela Lee, Penber Pan, Shara Lin, Miao Ke-li, Chen Wen Shan, Daniel Luo, He Zi Yan, Ah Ben	130	
July 23	SETTV; ETTV	軍官·情人; Bitter Sweet	Ma Zhi Qin, Kou Hsi-Shun, Esther Liu, Ahn Zhe, Tracy Chou, Xiu Jie Kai, Michael Zhang, Steven Sun, Esther Yang	74	
August 7 August 8	SETTV; ETTV	料理高校生; Love Cuisine	Lego Lee, Allison Lin, Duncan Chow, Nita Lei	22	
August 22; August 23	TTV; ETTV	致，第三者; To the Dearest Intruder	Amber An, Melvin Sia, Aggie Hsieh, Marcus Chang	15	
August 29	STAR Chinese Channel	我的鬼基友; I Am Sorry, I Love You	Ray Chang, Jasper Liu, Andrea Chen	13	
August 30	FTV	星座愛情水瓶女; Aquarius	Kimi Hsia, Nicholas Teo, Johnny Lu, Amily Lou	11	
September 9	GTV	明若曉溪; Moon River	Pets Tseng, Sam Lin, Evan Ma, Cao Xi Yue, Xu Kai Cheng, Tsai Yi-chen	30	
October 16; October 17	TTV; TVBS	唯一繼承者; Taste of Love	Ray Chang, Vivian Sung, Yang Ching, Hero Tai	15	
October 18; October 24	TTV; SETTV	愛上哥們; Bromance	Baron Chen, Megan Lai, Bii, Sean Lee, Katie Chen	18	
November 1 November 7	CTV; ETTV	必娶女人; Marry Me, or Not?	Roy Chiu, Ko Chia-yen, Joanne Tseng, Harry Chang	15	
November 4	SETTV; ETTV	戀愛鄰距離; Love or Spend	Kingone Wang, Hong Xiao Ling, Jolin Chien, Dayuan Lin	77	
November 15	FTV	星座愛情魔羯女; Capricorn	Amanda Chu, William Hsieh, Chris Lee Chih-cheng, Suan Wang	8	
December 12; December 13	TTV; ETTV	我的30定律; Thirty Something	Xiu Jie Kai, Kimi Hsia, Esther Liu, Samuel Gu	16	
December 12; December 13	Videoland Drama; SETTV	舞吧舞吧在一起; Be With Me	Jason Tsou, Queen Wei, River Huang, Fabien Yang, Tang Zhen-gang, Figaro Tseng	16	
December 19; December 24	PTS; PTS HD	一把青; A Touch of Green	Weber Yang, Cheryl Yang, Tien Hsin, Gabriel Lan, Wu Kang-ren, Lian Yu Han, Wen Chen-ling, Hans Chung	31	
December 28	PTS; PTS HD	燦爛時光; The Best of Youth	Wu Chien-ho, Yao Chun-yao, Fion Fu, Austin Lin, Alice Chia	20	

=== 2016 ===
Status	Networks	Title	Cast	Episodes	Note
January 10	FTV	新娘嫁到; Tân Nương Giá Đáo	Tang Mei-yun, Junior Han	13	
January 22; January 23	SET Metro; EBC Variety	1989一念間; Back to 1989	Marcus Chang, Ivy Shao, Mini Tsai, Yorke Sun, Ray Yang, Chang Chieh	21	
January 29; January 30	TTV; TVBS Entertainment Channel	幸福不二家; Shia Wa Se	Bobby Dou, Mariko Okubo, Phoebe Huang, Lo Pei-An	14	
February 21; February 27	CTV; STAR Chinese Channel	聶小倩; Nie Xiaoqian	Annie Chen, Christopher Lee, Mo Tzu-yi, Teresa Daley	20	
February 24	SET Metro; EBC Variety	大人情歌; The Love Song	Darren Chiu, Vivi Lee, Tracy Chou, Sean Lee, Steven Sun, Julie Ting	70	
March 1	TTV	加油！美玲; Fighting Meiling	Mini Chao, Teddy Wang, Ah Pang, Julianne Chu, Crystal Lin	191	
March 4 March 5	SET Taiwan; GTV One	紫色大稻埕; La Grande Chaumiere Violette	Eli Shih, Ko Chia-yen, Grace Lin, Rexen Cheng	22	
March 6 March 12	TTV; SET Metro	後菜鳥的燦爛時代; Refresh Man	Aaron Yan, Joanne Tseng, Lene Lai, Jack Lee	17	
March 24	GTV Variety Show	我家是戰國; War Family	William Hsieh, Melody Yin, Ko Shu-chin, Hai Yu Fen, Joanne Yang, Ryan Kuo	40	
March 28; April 5	Hakka TV; Star Entertainment Channel	谷風少年; The Youth!	You Jun Ping, Wu Cheng-Di, Crystal Lin, Stanly Chen, Hong Pei Jia, Herb Hsu, Hong Qi Yang, Liu Er Jin, Hsieh Yu-Wei, Wen Ji Xing	20	
April 9 April 10	TTV; EBC Variety	我和我的十七歲; Love @ Seventeen	Lego Lee, Nikki Hsieh, Amanda Chou, Edison Wang, Alina Cheng	15	
April 9	PTS	滾石愛情故事; Rock Records in Love		20	Omnibus Drama
April 12	FTV	我的老師叫小賀; My Teacher Is Xiao-he	Chloe Wang, Sabrina Pai, Gino Tsai, Kurt Chou, Debbie Huang, Kerri Hua	444	
April 17	FTV	阿不拉的三個女人; The King of Drama	Alex Ko, Chantel Liu, Lee Luo Ching, Wang Tong	41	
April 20	CTV; STAR Chinese Channel	原來1家人; Golden Darling	Pauline Lan, Roy Chiu, Kuo Shu-yao, Hsieh Kun Da, Jeremy Liu	40	
May 6 May 7	TTV; TVBS Entertainment Channel	遺憾拼圖; Life List	Yang Kuei-mei, Melvin Sia, Huang Peijia, Harry Chang, Jacqueline Zhu, Lee Yi	15	
June 1	SET Metro; EBC Variety	我的極品男友; Better Man	Lin Yo-Wei, Tender Huang, Jolin Chien, Cindy Lien, Shara Lin, Hope Lin	60	
June 15; July 5	CTV; CTi Entertainment	來自未來的史密特; Future Mr. Right	Lin Yo-Wei, Tia Lee, Hans Chung, Lene Lai	20	
June 18	PTS	今晚，你想點什麼？ Tonight	Chiung-Tzu Chang, Yang Lie	20	
June 20	CTS	火車情人; Memory	Lee Tien-chu, Chang Shu-hao, Summer Meng, Chang Han, Ariel Ann, Ada Pan	30	
June 27	GTV Variety Show	終極一班4; KO ONE: RE-MEMBER	Pets Tseng, Wes Lo, Wayne Huang, Sylvia Wang, Zhao Zhi Wei, He Dong Dong, Jiang Rui Ze	60	
July 3 July 9	TTV; SET Metro	狼王子; Prince of Wolf	Amber An, Derek Chang, Samuel Gu, Katie Chen	18	
July 8 July 9	SET Metro; EBC Variety	飛魚高校生; Swimming Battle	Kingone Wang, Mandy Wei, Enson Chang, Cindy Yen, Emerson Tsai	18	
July 12; July 13	CTV; CTi Entertainment; CTi Variety	美好年代; A Good Day	Bruce Hung, Eugenie Liu, An Jun Peng, Jacob Hwang, Yang Ming Wei	66	
July 13	CTV	皇恩浩蕩; Your Majesty	Lee Jang-woo, Anna Fang, Owodog, Andrea Chen	20	
July 30; July 31	TTV; EBC Variety	必勝練習生; Love By Design	Alan Ko, Allison Lin, Ahn Zhe, Beatrice Fang	16	
August 1	CTS	海海人生; Life As An Ocean	June Tsai, Michael Zhang, Ah Ben, Patrick Lee	38	
August 5 August 6	SET Taiwan; GTV One	白鷺鷥的願望; My Sister	Joanne Lien, Junior Han, Christine Chang, Chunya Chao	21	
August 6 August 14	GTV One; GTV Drama	命運交叉路; Crossroads of Destiny	Josh Huo, Gillian Mo, Zhou Ming Zeng	13	
August 19; August 20	TTV; GTV Variety Show	植劇場－戀愛沙塵暴; Q Series - Love Of Sandstorm	Wu Kang-ren, Ko Shu-chin, Fan Kuang-yao, Chen Yu, Deng Yukai, Greg Hsu, Esther Yeh, Ye Chen Ting	7	
September 19	GTV Variety Show	終極遊俠; The Ultimate Ranger	Luo Yunxi, Eva Cheng, Evan Ma, Lyan Cheng	20	
October 7 October 8	TTV; GTV Variety Show	植劇場－荼蘼; Life Plan A and B	Rainie Yang, Yan Yu Lin, Johnny Lu	6	
October 12	CTV; CTi Entertainment	多桑の純萃年代; The Age of Innocence	Shi Feng, Yin Chao-te, Ting Chen, Jack Lee, Joanne Lien, Esther Huang, Demi Yin, Kao Shan-Feng, Danny Liang, Shanny Tu	55	
October 15	GTV Variety Show	High 5 制霸青春; High 5 Basketball	Wes Lo, Mao Di, Simon Lian, Janet Hsieh, Johnny Lu, Lee Lee-zen, Lung Shao-hua, Vince Kao, Lyan Cheng, Cosmos Lin	13	
October 26	SET Metro; EBC Variety	獨家保鑣; V-Focus	Melvin Sia, Ling Hung, Huang Wei Ting, Yorke Sun	65	
November 12	TVBS Entertainment Channel	在一起，就好; Stand By Me	Hans Chung, Pets Tseng, Ian Chen, Amber Chen, Zhang Guang Chen	15	
November 13; November 19	TTV; SET Metro	浮士德的微笑; Behind Your Smile	Marcus Chang, Eugenie Liu, Sean Lee, Angel Hong, Esther Yang	19	
November 18; November 19	TTV; GTV Variety Show	植劇場－姜老師，你談過戀愛嗎？ Q Series - Jiang Teacher, You Talked About Love It	Lan Cheng-lung, Esther Yeh, He Yu Chen	6	
November 23	TTV	700歲旅程; All in 700	Darren Chiu, Jessie Chang, Ikeya Chen, Andy Kung, Jason King, Ting Chiang, Lung Shao-hua	60	
December 3 December 4	TTV; EBC Variety	如朕親臨; The King of Romance	Lego Lee, Cindy Lien, Gabriel Lan, Serena Fang	17	
December 11; December 17	Super TV; EBC Variety	惡作劇之吻; Miss in Kiss	Dino Lee, Esther Wu, Gong Yi Teng, Xi Wei Lun	13	
December 12	Hakka TV	明天一起去樂園; Game	Chang Han, Gina Lim, Roy Tu, Wen Ji Xing, Patty Chu, Qiu Yu Xuan, Damian Wu, Ariel Ann, Zhong Bing Yu, Elsa Ge	20	
December 28	CTV; CTi Entertainment	讓愛飛揚; Let It Fly	Johnny Kou, Edison Wang, Kou Chia-Jui, Angus Kuo, Ray Yang, Joelle Lu, Ching Yang, Genie Chan, Liu Qian Wen	40	
December 30; December 31	TTV; GTV Variety Show	植劇場－天黑請閉眼; Close Your Eyes Before It's Dark	Chang Shu-hao, Jian Man-shu, Sun Ke Fang, Allen Chen, Jake Hsu, Zhu Sheng Ping, Lan Ya Yun, Cao Yan Hao, Huang Di-yang	7	

=== 2017 ===
Status	Networks	Title	Cast	Episodes	Note
February 24; February 25	TTV; GTV Variety Show	植劇場－積木之家; Q Series - House of Toy Bricks	Eli Shih, Phoebe Lin, Wanting Chen, Ricie Fun, Lü Hsueh-feng, Figaro Tseng, Winnie Chang, Elten Ting	7	
March 3 March 4	SET Metro; EBC Variety	極品絕配; The Perfect Match	Wu Kang-ren, Ivy Shao, Ben Wu, Suan Wang, Nylon Chen	22	
March 7	SET Metro; EBC Variety	只為你停留; Just for You	Patrick Lee, Esther Huang, Jolin Chien, Vera Yen	63	
March 13	CTV	櫻桃小丸子; Maruko	Zoey Lin, Lin Yo-Wei, Demi Yin, Mandy Wei, Ku Pao-ming, Tan Ai-chen, Jiro Wang	30	
March 18	PTS; TVBS Entertainment Channel	酸甜之味; Family Time	He Yi-hang, Ko Shu-chin, June Tsai, Chang Shu-hao, Sean Huang, Allison Lin, Beatrice Fang	15	
March 26	FTV	媽媽不見了; She's Family	Tsai Chen-nan, Yang Kuei-mei, Rene Hou, Kaiser Chuang, Chung Hsin-Ling	2	
March 26; April 1	TTV; SET Metro	我的愛情不平凡; The Masked Lover	Weber Yang, Mini Tsai, Kurt Chou, Genie Chan	19	
March 27	Hakka TV	勞動之王; Karoshi	Tender Huang, Ariel Ann, Samuel Gu, Luo Si Qi, Christine Chang	20	
March 28	CTV; CTi Variety	這些年那些事; Never Forget Then	An Jun Peng, Yu-Shan Liu, Kris Shen, Kate Jin	40	
April 2	PTS; HBO Asia	通靈少女; The Teenage Psychic	Kuo Shu-yao, Kent Tsai, Sylvia Hsieh, Alina Cheng, Akio Chen	6	
April 9	FTV	外鄉女; Far and Away		11	Omnibus Drama
April 14; April 15	TTV; GTV Variety Show	植劇場－夢裡的一千道牆; Q Series - 1000 Walls In Dream	River Huang, Christina Mok, Zhang Yi Jun, Jake Hsu, Allen Chen	6	
April 15; April 16	TTV; EBC Variety	鐘樓愛人; Love, Timeless	Nick Chou, Summer Meng, Huang Wei Ting, Chang Chieh	15	
April 16; April 22	TTV; Hakka TV	閱讀時光2; Reading Taiwan Literature II		4	Omnibus Drama
May 23	TTV	牡丹花開; Peony In Bloom	Sun Shu-may, Li Luo, Louis Lin, Josh Huo	100	
May 26; May 27	TTV; GTV Variety Show	植劇場－花甲男孩轉大人; Q Series - Boy Named Flora	Crowd Lu, Tsai Chen-nan, Lotus Wang, Fan Zu Mei, Hsieh Ying-hsuan, Vera Yen	7	
June 19	GTV Variety Show	終極三國2017; K.O. 3an Guo	Wayne Huang, Sam Lin, Jin Zhong Xi, Evan Ma, Ian Yi, Zhang He Ming, Zhao Yao Ke, Eunice Han, Lucia Chen, Minyee Chen, Chu Qiao, Lu Bing Xuan	69	
July 8	PTS	起鼓·出獅; Lion Dance	Vince Kao, Hsieh Ying-hsuan, Chi Kuan-chun	5	
July 14; July 15	TTV; GTV Variety Show	植劇場－五味八珍的歲月; Q Series - What She Put On the Table	Amber An, Chris Lee Chih-cheng, Hans Chung, Sun Ke-Fang, Yen Yu-Lin	6	
July 29	PTS	他們在畢業的前一天爆炸2; Days We Stared at the Sun II	Wu Chien-ho, Doris Chang, Song Bai Wei, Hu Guang Wen	6	
July 30; August 6	CTV; EBC Drama	稍息立正我愛你; Attention, Love!	Joanne Tseng, Prince Chiu, Kuo Shu-yao, Riley Wang	15	
August 5 August 6	TTV; EBC Variety	我和我的四個男人; Jojo's World	Tia Lee, Jacob Hwang, Yen-j, Jason Hsu, Andy Wu, Sharon Hsu	15	
August 6 August 12	TTV; SET Metro	噗通噗通我愛你; Memory Love	Andy Chen, Mandy Wei, Jolin Chien, Mandy Tao, Kris Shen, Nylon Chen	18	
September 2	Videoland Drama; Golden TV Drama	最好的選擇; Always Be With You	Allen Chen, Phoebe Yuan, Kao Shan-Feng, Ariel Ann	16	
September 9 September 10	PTS; FTV; GTV Drama	麻醉風暴2; Wake Up 2	Jag Huang, Hsu Wei-ning, Lego Lee, Summer Meng, Wu Kang-ren	13	
September 13	PTS	魔幻對決; Magic Showdown	Tien Hsin, Soda Voyu, Chang Han	5	
September 14	FTV	實習醫師鬥格; Intern Doctor	Chang Chieh, Teddy Chen, Lulu Chung, Lin Bo Yu	358	
October 16; November 4	PTS + PTS	城市情歌; Songs and the City	Pan Li-li, Yen Yi-wen, Angela Lee, Teddy Wang, Sun Qing, Chang Chiung-Tzu, Blackie Chen	20	
October 24	SET Metro; EBC Variety	真情之家; Home Sweet Home	Miao Ke-li, William Hsieh, Yorke Sun, Esther Yang, Vivi Lee, JR	34	
October 24	CTS	春風愛河邊; A Canal Runs Through Love	Mike Lee, Grace Lin, Teddy Wang, Margaret Wang	60	
October 28	Videoland Drama	逃婚一百次; Running Man	Alien Huang, Lee Chien-na, Lin Yu-Chih, Chang Chin-lan	20	
November 5	FTV	機密訊號; TOP Secret	Tender Huang, Kunda Hsieh, Shara Lin, Allen Liang	3	
December 2 December 3	TTV; EBC Variety	獅子王強大; Lion Pride	Yen Tsao, Amanda Chou, Kevin Liu, Peace Yang	16	
December 10; December 16	TTV; SET Metro	已讀不回的戀人; See You in Time	Hans Chung, Mini Tsai, Esther Huang, David Chiu	16	
December 22; December 23; December 24	TTV; GTV Drama; GTV Variety Show	我的男孩; My Dear Boy	Ruby Lin, Derek Chang, Archie Kao, Lee Lee-zen	20	

=== 2018 ===
Status	Networks	Title	Cast	Episodes	Note
January 12; January 13	SET Metro; EBC Variety	姊的時代; Iron Ladies	Aviis Zhong, Ben Wu, Zhu Zhi-Ying, Wu Ting-Chien, Ada Pan, Jack Lee	13	
January 22	iQIYI	終極一班5; KO ONE: RE-CALL	Evan Ma, Calvin Chen, Tsai Yi-chen, Wes Lo, Wayne Huang, Sylvia Wang, Jiang Rui Ze	60	
March 3	TVBS Entertainment Channel	翻牆的記憶; Age Of Rebellion	Peter Ho, Yang Ching, Tammy Chen, Lee Chien-na, Jason Tsou, Zhang Ting-hu, Wu Nien-hsuan	15	
March 14; March 17	iQIYI; TTV; EBC Variety	1006的房客; Meet Me @1006	Lego Lee, Nikki Hsieh, Hsieh Kunda, Aggie Hsieh, Tender Huang, Greg Hsu	26	
March 31; April 1	TTV; EBC Variety	高塔公主; Single Ladies Senior	Summer Meng, Christina Mok, Duncan Chow, Sky Li, Edison Wang, Alina Cheng, Bonnie Wang, Chie Tanaka, Gabriel Lan	15	
April 2	Hakka TV	台北歌手; Roseki	Morning Mo, Huang Peijia, Candy Yang	14	
April 15; April 21	TTV; SET Metro	三明治女孩的逆襲; Between	Marcus Chang, Esther Yeh, Sam Lin, Sean Lee, Kelly Liao	18	
May 18; May 19	TTV; GTV Drama	前男友不是人！？ The Ex-Man	Rainie Yang, Lan Cheng-lung, Johnny Lu, Li Xing	13	
June 13; June 16	iQIYI; TTV; EBC Variety	人際關係事務所; Befriend	Tsao Yu-ning, Kuo Shu-yao, Po-Chieh Wang, Umin Boya, Peace Yang	24	
June 16	PTS	奇蹟的女兒; The Coming Through	Wen Chen-ling, Lien Yu-Han, Sun Ke-Fang, JC Lin, Brando Huang	4	
July 7	PTS; Netflix	你的孩子不是你的孩子; On Children	Chuan-Chen Yeh, Chung Hsin-ling, Frances Wu	10	Five different stories: Mother's Remote, Child of the Cat, The Last Day of Molly, Peacock, and ADHD Is Necessary
July 10; July 12	TVBS Entertainment Channel; TTV	女兵日記; Girl's Power	Chantel Liu, Allen Liang, Huang Yu Hsien, Yang Ching, Mirza Atif Ali Baig, Yang Ya-Zhu, Wingle Chen, Fish Lin, David Lin, Sharon Lee	92	
July 12	Videoland Variety	霹靂電娃; Charlie Electric Doll	Genie Chuo, Phoebe Yuan, Mu Qiao, Jason Hsu, Allen Liang	20	
July 21; July 22	TTV; EBC Variety	愛的3.14159; Love & π	Ivy Shao, Ben Wu, Daniel Chen, Jenny Lee, Candy Yang	17	
July 30; July 31	CTS; Line TV; Choco TV	搖滾畢業生; Rock Soulmate	Wayne Huang, Esther Wu, Kenny Khoo, Daniel Chen, Yang Jing Han, Eunice Lin, Lin Zi Shan	17	
August 18	PTS	憤怒的菩薩; Bodhisattva in Storm	Wu Kang-ren, Wu Chien-ho, Esther Liu, Cosmos Lin, Ryan Kuo, Lawrence Ko	4	
August 19; August 25	TTV; SET Metro	高校英雄傳; Campus Heroes	Wes Lo, Juno Liu	16	
September 1 September 2	Netflix; PTS; FTV	雙城故事; A Taiwanese Tale of Two Cities	Tammy Chen, James Wen, Peggy Tseng, Denny Huang	20	
September 12; September 17	PTS + PTS	8號公園; Park No.8	Wang Chuan, Lin Xiu Jun, Jiang Ying Yao, Yin Chao-te, Shelly Wang	60	
September 30	PTS	20之後; Utopia For The 20s	Cammy Jiang, Lin Sun Yu Hao, Zheng Jing Xin, Yeh Tzu-Yu, Shawn Hu, He Yi-hang, Janet Hsieh, Phoebe Lin, Kenny Yan	20	
October 17	TVBS Entertainment Channel	初戀的情人; First Love	William Hsieh, Sunny Tu, Ada Pan, Dayuan Lin, Kevin Liu	53	
November 15; November 19	TVBS Entertainment Channel; TTV	女兵日記女力報到; Girl's Power 2	Mirza Atif Ali Baig, Yang Ching, Sharon Lee, David Lin, Wingle Chen, Huang Yu Hsien, Yang Ya-Zhu, Liang Shu Han, Aiko Fang, Miya, Allen Liang, Fish Lin	285; 208	
November 16; November 17	iQIYI; TTV; EBC Variety	種菜女神; My Goddess	Jasper Liu, Annie Chen, Lee Chien-na, Jake Hsu	24	
November 24; November 25	TTV; EBC Variety	艾蜜麗的五件事; Five Missions	Aviis Zhong, Sam Lin, Edison Wang, Zang Rui Xuan	15	
November 24; December 23	Vidol; SET Metro	你好，幸福; Kira Kira in The Life	Esther Yeh, Esther Yang, Vivi Lee, Melody Yin, Andy Wu, Samuel Gu, Gabriel Lan	5	

=== 2019 ===
Status	Networks	Title	Cast	Episodes	Note
January 6 January 12	TTV; SET Metro	你有念大學嗎？ Hello Again!	Amber An, Bruce Hung, Sean Lee, Mao Di, Oceana Wu	16	
January 8	SET Metro	必勝大丈夫; My Hero, My Daddy	Tsai Chen-nan, Yang Li-yin, Amanda Chou, Kurt Chou, Linda Lin, David Chiu, Teresa Chen	41	
February 16	PTS; Netflix	魂囚西門; Green Door	Jam Hsiao, Bea Hayden, Enno Cheng, Hsieh Ying-hsuan, Jason King, Lan Wei Hua	6	
March 1 March 3	TTV; GTV Drama	我是顧家男; Without Her, Even Hero Is 0	Cheryl Yang, Jag Huang, Melvin Sia, Chang Chin-lan	13	
March 9 March 10	TTV; EBC Variety	愛情白皮書; Brave to Love	Zhang Ting Hu, Gingle Wang, Edison Song, Sylvia Hsieh, Andy Wu	15	
March 19; March 27	iQIYI; CTV	鑑識英雄II 正義之戰; Crime Scene Investigation Center 2	Wang Shih-hsien, Kurt Chou, Janel Tsai, Mini Tsai, Soda Voyu	16	
March 24	PTS; CatchPlay; HBO Asia	我們與惡的距離; The World Between Us	Alyssa Chia, James Wen, Wu Kang-ren, Chou Tsai-Shih, Shih Ming-shuai, Allison Lin, Pets Tseng, JC Lin, Chen Yu	10	
March 29; May 31	SET Metro; Netflix	一千個晚安; A Thousand Goodnights	Nicholas Teo, Lien Yu-Han, Li Chung Lin, Pipi Yao	20	
April 8	Hakka TV	日據時代的十種生存法則; Survive	Wu Cheng-Di, Chihtian Shih, Chang Ning	12	
April 21	FTV	老鼠捧茶請人客; The Mouse Serves A Guest Tea	Lu Yi-ching, Lee Chien-na, Fu Tzu-Chun, Huang Shu Mei	2	
April 24; April 27	iQIYI; TTV; EBC Variety	如果愛，重來; Déjà Vu	Chang Shu-hao, Ko Chia-yen, Andy Wu	24	
May 4	PTS	生死接線員; The Coordinators	Figaro Tseng, Daphne Low, Li Xing, Shan Cheng-Ju, Qiu Zhen Han	10	
May 5 May 11	CTS; CTi Entertainment	最佳利益; Best Interest	Tien Hsin, Hans Chung, James Wen	13	
May 5 May 11	TTV; SET Metro	月村歡迎你; Back to Home	Hsieh Kunda, Cosmos Lin, Wu Nien-hsuan, Angela Lee, Yang Kuei-mei	18	
May 14	GTV Variety Show	90後的我們; Generation Z	Teresa Chen, Curtis Chen, Steven Jian, Bradley Barth	40	
May 31; June 2	TTV; GTV Drama	我們不能是朋友; Before We Get Married	Jasper Liu, Puff Kuo, Steven Sun, Nita Lei	13	
June 8	PTS	噬罪者; Hate The Sin, Love The Sinner	Kaiser Chuang, Kimi Hsia, Yen Tsao, Long Chen Han, Ying Tsai-Ling, Janel Tsai, Kenny Yen	13	
June 14	SET Taiwan	天之蕉子; The Love Story In Banana Orchard	Yankee Yang, Patty Wu, Candy Yang, Wingle Chen	22	
June 24	Star Chinese Movies; FOX +	浮士德遊戲2; Code 2	Xiu Jie Kai, Aviis Zhong, Shang-Ho Huang, Eleven Yao	10	
July 6 July 7	TTV; EBC Variety	男神時代; The Way We Love	Melvin Sia, Stars Yeh, Kevin Liu, Una Lu, Peace Yang, An Jun Peng	15	
July 9	GTV Variety Show	一起幹大事; Go Big or Go Home	Lee Luo, Miao Ke-li, Mao Di, Lai Ya Qi, Tim Yang, Xu Qiao Wei, Qiu Jiu Ru	40	
July 18	CTS	鬥陣來鬧熱; Welcome Happy Together	Lotus Wang, Fang Jun, Henry Hsu, Ho Pei Pei	45	
July 19	LINE TV; GTV Variety Show	靈異街11號; The Fearless	Lego Lee, Jian Man-shu	13	
July 27	PTS; PTS Taigi	苦力; Coolie	Emerson Tsai, Huang Wen-hsing, Jun Fu, Ikeya Chen, Grace Lin, Sabrina Pai	30	
August 2	Star Chinese Channel; FOX +	遺失的1/2; The Missing Half	Huang Peijia, Anson Chen, Edison Wang, Dara Hanfman, JC Lin	14	
August 4	CTS; CatchPlay	俗女養成記; The Making of An Ordinary Woman	Hsieh Ying-hsuan, Bella Wu, Bamboo Chen, Yang Li-yin, Hsia Ching-Ting, Sara Yu, James Wen	10	
August 15; September 8	Netflix; PTS iQIYI	鏡文學驚悚劇場; Til Death Do Us Part	Wen Chen-ling, Kerr Hsu, Liao Ya Jun, Fan Jiang Tai Ji, Ban Tie-Hsiang, Nikki Hsieh, Winnie Chang, Bai Run-yin, Bai Xiao-Ying	7	
August 16; August 17	CTS; SET Metro; Star Chinese Channel	用九柑仔店; Yong-jiu Grocery Store	Derek Chang, Christina Mok, Lin Yi Xiong, Lei Hong, Lung Shao-hua, Huang Hsi Tien, Wang Man-Chiao, Phil Yan, Allen Chen, Jane Cheng, Shiny Zhang, Ting Kuo-Lin, Wu Pong-fong	10	
August 30; September 1	TTV; GTV Drama	你那邊怎樣·我這邊OK; All Is Well	Lan Cheng-lung, Joanne Tseng, Desmond Tan, Pets Tseng, Tou Chung-hua, Pauline Lan, Zoe Tay, Chen Hanwei, Zhang Yaodong, Paige Chua, Denise Camillia Tan	40	
September 8 September 14	TTV; SET Metro	網紅的瘋狂世界; Let's Go Crazy on LIVE!	Ben Wu, Chloe Xiang, Jolin Chien, Belle Chuo	20	
October 6	PTS; HBO Asia	通靈少女2; The Teenage Psychic 2	Kuo Shu-yao, Wen Chen-ling, Fandy Fan	8	
October 19	TVBS Entertainment Channel	天堂的微笑; Endless Love	Xiu Jie Kai, Allison Lin, Gary Tang, Beatrice Fang, Shang-Ho Huang	15	
October 21	Hakka TV	烏陰天的好日子; Light of Cloudy Day	Enson Chang, Fang Yu-Hsin, Wang Chuan, Liao Yi-Chiao, Damian Wu, Clara Lee, Daphne Low	16	
October 29	CTS	守著陽光守著你; Wait for the Sun, Wait for You	Jay Shih, Lee Chien-na, Penber Pan, Oceana Wu	30	
October 31	Netflix	罪夢者; Nowhere Man	Joseph Chang, Alyssa Chia, Mavis Fan	8	
November 16	PTS; Netflix	糖糖Online; Candy Online	Ruby Zhan, Suun Lin, Zhi-Ying Zhu, Ada Pan, Chen Wen Shan	13	
November 17; November 23	CTV; Star Chinese Channel; FOX +	想見你; Someday Or One Day	Ko Chia-yen, Greg Hsu, Patrick Shih, Kenny Yen	13	
November 18	EBC Drama	美味滿閣; Sweet Family	Kingone Wang, Mandy Wei, JR, Linda Lin, Vivi Lee, Wes Lo, Miao Ke-li, Lung Shao-hua, Shen Meng-Sheng	63	
December 1 December 7	FTV; PTS	鏡子森林; The Mirror	Cheryl Yang, Yao Chun-yao, Rene Hou, Alex Ko, Rexen Cheng	30	
December 6	Netflix	極道千金; Triad Princess	Jasper Liu, Eugenie Liu	6	
December 16	Hakka TV	四分之3; On the Road	Phil Yan, Da-her Lin, Teresa, Wu Cheng-yang, Lü Hsueh-feng, Sharon Huang, Annie Duan	12	
December 24	TVBS Entertainment Channel; CTV	女力報到－小資女上班記; Girl's Power 3	Mirza Atif Ali Baig, Yang Ching, Sharon Lee, David Lin, Wingle Chen, Huang Yu Hsien, Yang Ya-Zhu, Liang Shu Han, Aiko Fang, Miya, Allen Liang, Fish Lin	50	

=== 2020 ===
Status	First Air Date	Networks	Title	Cast	Episodes	Note
Finished	January 20	friDay	國際橋牌社; Island Nation	Yang Lie, Lin Tzay-peir, Kurt Chou, Li Xing, Wu Ting-Chien, Liao Yi-chiao, Hsia Teng-hung, Chen Yu	10	
Finished	January 23	Netflix	彼岸之嫁; The Ghost Bride	Wu Kang-ren, Huang Pei-jia, Ludi Lin, Tian Tze Kuang	6	
Finished	February 2 February 8	TTV; SET Metro	跟鯊魚接吻; The Wonder Woman	Aviis Zhong, Wes Lo, Jack Lee, Chang Chin-lan, Gabriel Lan, Demi Yin	18	
Finished	February 6	TTV	四月望雨; Taiwan Story	Mei Fang, Wu Ching-hsien, Chang Fu-chien, Yang Kuei-mei, Penny Lin, Lee Chih-Ching, Hsiang-Lun Pang, Wu Pong-fong, Mariko Okubo, Vannesa Wang, Lin Yi Xiong	40	
Finished	February 8	TVBS Entertainment Channel iQIYI	墜愛; Moonlight Romance	Amber An, Edison Song, James Wen, Samuel Gu, Patricia Lin, Duke Wu, Helen Cheng	15	
Finished	March 6	TVBS Entertainment Channel; CTV	女力報到－愛神出任務; Girl's Power 4	Mirza Atif Ali Baig, Wingle Chen, Chloe Wang, Yang Ching, Yang Ya-Zhu, Allen Liang, Fish Lin, Jeff Wang, Sharon Lee, Liang Shu Han, Tseng Tzu-Yu, Yin Yen Kai, Ryan Li, Nysa Wang, You Xiao Bai, Thomas Chang, Wang Pei Yu	50	
Finished	March 28; March 29	TTV; GTV Drama; GTV Variety Show	覆活; Amensalism	Prince Chiu, Lorene Ren, Andy Wu, Eleven Yao	13	
Finished	April 4	PTS	妖怪人間; Monstrous Me	Chih-tian Shih, Chen Yi-wen, Lien Yu-Han, Tender Huang, Xiao Young-yu	8	
Finished	April 10; April 18	Vidol; SET Metro	位！你在等我嗎？ The Art of Position	Xavier Kong, Genie Chan, Wu Cheng-yang, Lee Yi	8	
Finished	April 15	EBC Drama	姊妹們追吧; You Go! Girls!	Hsieh Kunda, Pei-Ying Chang, Ko Shu-chin, Carolyn Chen, Yu-shan Liu, Bella Wu	60	
Finished	April 17	Vidol; SET News	限時同居侯八天; 8 Days Limited	Lee Poh-siang, Liang Yi-chan	12	
Finished	April 19	CTS; PTS Taigi	若是一個人; I, Myself	Sun Ke-fang, Edison Song, Sam Lin, Heather Chen, Da-her Lin	10	
Finished	April 30	Netflix	誰是被害者; The Victims' Game	Joseph Chang, Hsu Wei-ning, Wang Shih-hsien	8	
Finished	May 10	HBO myVideo	做工的人; Workers	Christopher Lee, Alex Ko, Yu An-shun, Miao Ke-li, Hsueh Shih-ling, Peggy Tseng	6	
Finished	May 15	TVBS Entertainment Channel; CTV	女力報到－最佳拍檔; Girl's Power 5	Ada Pan, Liang Shu Han, Tseng Tzu-Yu, Mirza Atif Ali Baig, Wingle Chen, Chloe Wang, Yang Ching, Yang Ya-Zhu, Allen Liang, Jeff Wang, Sharon Lee, Fish Lin, You Xiao Bai, Yin Yen Kai, Thomas Chang, Ryan Li, Nysa Wang, Wang Pei Yu	50	
Finished	May 16	PTS; NHK	路～台灣快線～ RU-- Taiwan Express Train	Haru, Arata Iura, Yasufumi Terawaki, Aaron Yan, Ivy Shao, Yang Lie, Lin Mei-hsiu	3	
Finished	May 19	TTV	生生世世; Born Into Loving Hands	Fang Wen-lin, Gail Lin, Mini Chao, Crystal Lin, Hsueh Shih-ling, Tseng tzu-yi	168	
Finished	June 6	PTS; PTS Taigi	我的婆婆怎麼那麼可愛; U Motherbaker	Chung Hsin-Ling, Huang Pei-jia, Chang Shu-Wei, Darren Chiu, Sam Wang, Johnny Yang, Jill Su, Hsu Chieh-Hui	40	
Finished	June 7 June 13	TTV; SET Metro	浪漫輸給你; Lost Romance	Marcus Chang, Vivian Sung, Simon Lian, Kelly Liao, Jason Hsu, Tsai Jui-hsueh	20	
Finished	June 28	CTS; PTS Taigi	老姑婆的古董老菜單; Recipe of Life	Lung Shao-hua, Wu Xiu Zhu, Vera Yen, Li Kuan Yi, Tseng tzu-yi, Yeliz Huang	10	
Finished	July 15; July 29	SET Metro; CTS	我的青春沒在怕; Young Days No Fears	Danson Tang, Mini Tsai, Edison Wang, Lyan Cheng, Genie Chan, Zang Rui Xuan, Sylvia Hsieh, Ariel Chiao	60	
Finished	July 17	myVideo	違反校規的跳投; Fly The Jumper	Wu Nien-hsuan, Kagami Kota, Tsai Jui-hsueh, Zack Fanchiang, Frederick Lee	4	
Finished	July 24	TVBS Entertainment Channel	女力報到－正好愛上你; Girl's Power 6	Sharon Lee, Jeff Wang, Yang Ya-Zhu, Allen Liang, Yang Ching, Mirza Atif Ali Baig, Chloe Wang, Wingle Chen, Amy Wang, Fish Lin, You Xiao Bai, Yin Yen Kai, Nysa Wang, Ryan Li, Thomas Chang	50	
Finished	July 31	SET Taiwan	羅雀高飛; Luo Que	Darren Chiu, Dayuan Lin, Jenson Tien, Vivi Lee	18	
Finished	August 2	Line TV; FTV	黑喵知情; Animal Whisper	Shih Ming-shuai, Cindy Lien, Jian Man-shu, Edison Wang	14	
Finished	August 16	HBO; HBO Asia	獵夢特工; Dream Raider	Wang Shih-hsien, Vivian Hsu, Wang Yaoqing, Weber Yang, Ellen Wu	8	
Finished	August 22	CTi Entertainment	那刻的怦然心動; Art In Love	George Hu, Kan Qingzi, Hong Yao, Sharon Kwan, Esther Liu, Huang Wei-ting, Mandy Tao, Janel Tsai, Ada Pan	39	
Finished	August 28	myVideo	追兇500天; Kill for Love	Mo Tzu-yi, Esther Huang, Lyan Cheng, Erek Lin	4	
Finished	September 12	CTi Variety	腦波小姐; The Haunted Heart	Ouyang Nini, Chang Shu-hao, Mini Tsai, Chang Chieh	20	
Finished	September 19; September 20	Star Chinese Channel; Star Chinese Movies	愛的廣義相對論; Memory Eclipse	Cheryl Yang, Vivian Sung, Kerr Hsu, Kaiser Chuang, Esther Liu, Samuel Gu, JC Lin, Nikki Hsieh, Frederick Lee	3	Anthology miniseries
Finished	September 19; September 20	TTV; GTV Drama	因為我喜歡你; Falling Into You	Jiro Wang, Puff Kuo, Desmond Tan, Jessie Chang	13	
Finished	October 2	TVBS Entertainment Channel	女力報到－最美的約定; Girl's Power 7	Yang Ching, Mirza Atif Ali Baig, Chloe Wang, Wingle Chen, Allen Liang, Yang Ya-Zhu, Sharon Lee, Jeff Wang, Kelly Poon, Fish Lin, Amy Yen, Lin Yao Cheng, Ryan Li, Nysa Wang, Yunnie Lin, Yin Yen Kai, Peggy Yang, Lee Poh-siang, Amy Wang, Wong Jinglun, You Xiao Bai, Thomas Chang, Chen Yen Ting	60	
Finished	October 25; October 26; October 31	TTV; Netflix; SET Metro	天巡者; The Devil Punisher	Mike He, Ivy Shao, Amanda Chou, Johnny Yang, Anson Chen, Jane Cheng, Roy Chang	20	
Finished	November 13	myVideo; KKTV	記憶浮島; Zihuatanejo	Ahn Zhe, Juno Liu, Vins Yi-Zheng, Genie Chan, Li Xing, Yorke Sun	14	
Finished	November 13	myVideo	不讀書俱樂部; Non Reading Club	Xiao Zi Mo, Moon Lee, JR, Chang Zhang-xing, Patricia Lin, Vivian Chen	12	
Finished	November 14	TVBS Entertainment Channel iQIYI	粉紅色時光; Magic Moment	Wu Nien-hsuan, Beatrice Fang, Vera Yen, Ian Chen, Nash Zhang	13	
Finished	November 17	SET Metro; CTS	廢財闖天關; Here Comes Fortune Star	Lego Lee, Lee Yi-chieh, David Chiu, Liang Shu-Han, Sean Lee, Liang Yi-Chan		
Finished	November 27	SET Metro myVideo	未來媽媽; Mother To Be	Kuo Shu-yao, Bruce Hung, Umin Boya, Esther Liu, Chris Lee Chih-cheng, Chang Ning, Hsia Teng-hung	16	
Finished	November 28	EBC Drama	王牌辯護人; Wacko at Law	George Hu, Stars Yeh, Johnny Lu, Huang Wei-ting, Suun Lin	15	
Finished	December 3 December 10	Youku; Netflix myVideo	預支未來; Futmalls.com	Chang Shu-hao, Eugenie Liu, Bruce Hung, Ivy Shao	8	
Finished	December 5	PTS; Netflix	返校; Detention	Ling Wei Lee, Han Ning	8	
Finished	December 13	HBO; HBO Asia	戒指流浪記; Adventure of the Ring	Chris Wang, Allison Lin	8	
Finished	December 16	Vidol	愛不愛栗絲; Love Alice or Not	Ivelyn Lee, Wang Ko-Yuan, Wen Yu-Fei, Jack Hsu, Joe Hsieh	12	
Finished	December 20	GTV Variety Show myVideo; Line TV	故事宮寓; Palace of Serendipity	Vivian Hsu, Janine Chang, Sandrine Pinna, Lego Lee, Kaiser Chuang, Liu Kuan-ting, Wu Nien-hsuan, Lien Yu-Han, Da-her Lin, Rima Zeidan	10	
Finished	December 27	Line TV	金愛演真探團; True Lie	Lego Lee, Jason King, Lung Shao-hua	24	
Finished	December 28	TVBS Entertainment Channel	女力報到－好運到; Girl's Power 8	Yang Ching, Mirza Atif Ali Baig, Chloe Wang, Wingle Chen, Allen Liang, Yang Ya-Zhu, Sharon Lee, Jeff Wang, Kelly Poon, Fish Lin, Amy Yen, Lin Yao Cheng, Ryan Li, Nysa Wang, Yunnie Lin, Yin Yen Kai, Peggy Yang, Lee Poh-siang, Amy Wang, Wong Jinglun, You Xiao Bai, Thomas Chang, Chen Yen Ting, Fon Cin, Lawrence Liu, Li Xuan Rong	50	

== See also ==
- List of Taiwanese dramas from 2000 to 2010
- List of Taiwanese dramas from 2021 to present
- Taiwanese drama
- Television in Taiwan
- List of Chinese-language television channels
- List of Taiwanese television series
