= List of Taiwanese dramas =

Lists of Taiwanese dramas are grouped by date and include the following:

- List of Taiwanese dramas from 2000 to 2010;
- List of Taiwanese dramas from 2011 to 2020;
- List of Taiwanese dramas from 2021 to present.
