= List of Taiwanese dramas from 2021 to present =

This is a list of Taiwanese dramas since 2021.

== 2021 to present ==
=== 2021 ===
Status	First Air Date	Networks	Title	Cast	Episodes	Note
Finished	January 2	PTS	大債時代; Who Killed the Good Man	Austin Lin, Patty Lee, Esther Huang, Edward Chen, Chang Shu-hao	6	
Finished	January 8	WeTV	We Best Love－永遠的第一名; We Best Love: No. 1 For You	Sam Lin, YU, Richard Lee, Evan Luo, Ray Chang, Zack Fanchiang, Chih Tian-shih	6	
Finished	January 31	GTV Drama; Star Chinese Channel	她們創業的那些鳥事; The Arc of Life	Ruby Lin, Ivy Chen, Jian Man-shu, Roy Chiu	26	
Finished	February 20	PTS myVideo	天橋上的魔術師; The Magician On The Skywalk	Kaiser Chuang, Edison Song, Sun Shu-may, Berant Zhu, Chu Meng-hsuan, Ben Yuen, Iain Lu, Wanfang	10	
Finished	March 1	SET Metro; CTS	廢財闖天關2; Here Comes Fortune Star 2	Lego Lee, Lee Yi-chieh, David Chiu, Yvonne Liang, Sean Lee, Liang Yi-Chan	30	
Finished	March 5	WeTV	We Best Love－第二名的逆襲; We Best Love: Fighting Mr. 2nd	Sam Lin, YU, Richard Lee, Evan Luo, Ray Chang, Zack Fanchiang, Chih Tian-shih	6	
Finished	March 11	TVBS Entertainment Channel	女力報到－愛情公寓; Girl's Power 9	Yang Ching, Mirza Atif Ali Baig, Chloe Wang, Wingle Chen, Sharon Lee, Jeff Wang, Austin Lin, Allen Liang, Xenia Yang, Fish Lin, Ryan Li, Nysa Wang, Wong Jinglun, Johnny Yin, Thomas Chang, Danny Lee, Kelly Poon, Poyu Lin, Peggy Yang, Amy Yan, Yunnie Lin, Beatrice Fang	50	
Finished	March 12	Hami Video	都嘛是你的毛; Fluffy Love	Kent Tsai, Mandy Wei, Belle Shin	4	
Finished	March 14	YouTube	親愛的天王星; Dear Uranus	Vivian Chen, Erol, Juuko Zhu	3	
Finished	March 14	LINE TV	HIStory4 - 近距離愛上你; HIStory 4: Close to You	Charles Tu, Anson Chen, Michael An, Lin Chia-wei, Cindy Chi	20	
Finished	March 21	TTV; SET Metro	戀愛是科學; Love is Science?	Wu Nien-hsuan, Christina Mok, Anderson Cheng, Lin Yu, Huang Wei Ting, Yeh Chuan-chen	20	
Finished	March 22	Hakka TV	女孩上場; Girls Win	Zhang Yu Xi, Money Cai, Fan Jiang Tai Ji, Kao Ying Hsuan, Xu Rui-ling, Gao Qian-yi, Li Hui-rong, Wu Yi Rong	12	
Finished	April 12	SET Metro; CTS	三隻小豬的逆襲; Piggy's Counterattack	Kingone Wang, Megan Lai, Melvin Sia, Mandy Wei, Suun Lin, Yorke Sun, Lee Tien-chu, Vickey Liu	70	
Finished	April 23	GagaOOLala	酷蓋爸爸; Papa & Daddy	Melvin Sia, Lin Huei-huang	6	
Finished	April 23	FTV	日蝕遊戲; Game of Solar Eclipse	Lan Wei-hua, Chu Xuan, Lei Hong, Emily Liang, Lee Chih-ching, Phoebe Yuan, Chang Ming-chieh, Wang Ya-ting	3	
Finished	May 1	PTS myVideo; TVBS Entertainment Channel; EBC Drama	火神的眼淚; Tears on Fire	James Wen, Annie Chen, Austin Lin, Liu Kuan-ting	10	
Finished	May 20	TVBS Entertainment Channel	女力報到－男人止步; Girl's Power 10	Allen Liang, Xenia Yang, Mirza Atif Ali Baig, Yang Ching, Fish Lin, Kelly Poon, Johnny Yin, Yunnie Lin, Ryan Li Cheng Ta, Nysa Wang, Austin Lin, Amy Yan, Wong Jinglun, Wish Chu, Thomas Chang, Poyu Lin, Danny Lee, Peggy Yang, Hsu Kai Ling, You Hsiao Bai, Chen Yan Ting	50	
Finished	May 20	Vidol; KKTV	約·定; Be Loved in House: I Do	Aaron Lai, Hank Wang, Weipo Liao, Yu Jie En, Deyn Li	12	
Finished	June 13	HBO Asia; CatchPlay	第三佈局 塵沙惑; Trinity of Shadows	Sandrine Pinna, Kaiser Chuang, Liu Kuan-ting, Mandy Wei, Stanley Yau, Danny Lee, Huang Wei Ting, King Jieh Wen	15	
Finished	June 17	LINE TV	愛的奧特萊斯; Love's Outlet	Fu Meng Po, Louis Chiang, Chloe Xiang	50	
Finished	July 10	PTS; EBC Drama; LINE TV	神之鄉; The Summer Temple Fair	Wang Shih-hsien, Lee Lee-zen, Dino Lee, Chloe Xiang	10	
Finished	July 16	myVideo	我的老闆是隻貓; Meow Meow Boss	Ray Chang, Vera Yan, Sonia Yuan, Richard Lee, Gary Tang	7	
Finished	July 28	AMM	20年的約定; 20 Year Promise	Kent Tsai, Puff Kuo, David Chiu, Diane Lin, Krystian Muszynski, Ai Li, Alice Chen, Bryan Luo, Lin Heng An, Adam Wang	13	
Finished	July 29	TVBS Entertainment Channel	女力報到－男人止步2; Girl's Power 11	Kelly Poon, Nysa Wang, Xenia Yang, Yang Ching, Mirza Atif Ali Baig, Allen Liang, Fish Lin, Johnny Yin, Yunnie Lin, Ada Pan, Bryan Zhou, Zheng Ya, Beatrice Fang, Darren Chiu, Grace Ko, You Xiao Bai	50	
Finished	August 7	GTV Drama	超感應學園; Sometimes When We Touch	Kent Tsai, Eugenie Liu, Keung To, Tammy Lin, Kerr Hsu, Chun Hong, Bai Bai, Anson Lo	20	
Finished	August 8	CTS; CatchPlay	俗女養成記2; The Making of an Ordinary Woman 2	Hsieh Ying-xuan, Lan Wei Hua, Wu Yi Han, Bamboo Chen, Sara Yu, Wayne Song, Johnny Yang	10	
Finished	August 12	myVideo; PTS+	池塘怪談; The Pond	Da-her Lin, Buffy Chen, Shih Chih Tian, Miao Ke-li, David Chao, Chris Tsai, Zhang Shao Chen	10	
Finished	August 14	PTS	斯卡羅; SEQALU: Formosa 1867	Wu Kang-ren, Wen Chen-ling, Camake Valaule, Fabio Grangeon, Jag Huang, Andrew Chau, Sean Huang, Lei Hong, Hsia Ching Ting, Masiswagger Zingrur, Zhu Ru Yu, Chang Wei Fan, Guo Zhi Yun, Cheng Yi Ya, Xie Yu Xi	12	
Finished	September 3	iQIYI; Videoland Television Network	逆局; Danger Zone	Vic Chou, Sandrine Pinna, Christopher Lee, Tseng Jing-hua, Berant Zhu, Teresa Daley, Bell Hsin, Ma Nien-hsien, Huang Di-yang, Paul Chiang	24	
Finished	September 10	Self-released (Premium VOD)	國際橋牌社2; Island Nation 2	Yong Lea, Chen Chia Kuei, Tang Chih-wei, Joseph Hsia, Johnny Lu, Ricie Fun, Candy Yang, David Chao, An Jun Peng, Chan Chia-Ju, Jacko Chiang	10	
Finished	September 17	KKTV	隔離後見個面，好嗎？ See You After Quarantine?	Akihiro Kawai, Qiu Zhi Hao, Chang Ya Wei, Ollie Lin, Ouyang MAMA	10	
Finished	September 24	GagaOOLala	無邪; Innocent	Blake Chang, Yi Da Dian, Lee Chin Ting, Fifi Sun, Lee Yu Shao	4	
Finished	October 3	HBO Asia	誰在你身邊; Who's By Your Side	Janine Chang, Vivian Hsu, Kaiser Chuang, Chen En Feng, Wang Ko Yuan	10	
Finished	October 9	PTS	四樓的天堂; Heaven on the Fourth Floor	Anthony Wong, Hsieh Ying-xuan, Fandy Fun, Huang Pei-jia, True Wang, Lily Pan, Chen Chia Kuei	10	
Finished	October 16	TTV myVideo; EBC Drama	2049; 2049	Ivy Shao, Austin Lin, Lin Tzu Xi, Christina Mok, Chen Han Dian, Lee Yi-chieh	18	
Finished	October 17	PTS; FTV; Hami Video	孟婆客棧; Tavern by the Lethe	Tang Mei Yun, Shih Ying, Cai Zhen-nan, Lotus Wang, Wang Jin Ying, Lin Mei-hsiu	30	
Finished	November 13	PTS; Hakka TV	茶金; Gold Leaf	Kuo Tzu Chien, James Wen, Cindy Lien, Hsueh Shih-ling, Sophia Li	12	
Finished	December	Netflix	華燈初上; Light the Night	Ruby Lin, Cheryl Yang, Tony Yang, Esther Liu, Nikki Hsieh, Puff Kuo, Cammy Chiang, Hsieh Chiung Hsuan	24	

=== 2022–2025 ===
Status	First Air Date	Networks	Title	Cast	Episodes	Note
Finished	May 2022	PTS	村裡來了個暴走女外科; Mad Doctor	Janel Tsai, Chang Tsai Hsiang, Berant Zhu, Heaven Hai, Win Feng, Dtwang, Peggy Tseng, Tang Chih Wei, Ma Kuo Hsien, Helena Hsu, Pao Cheng Fang, BeBe Chang, Chen Yi Ruei	10	
Finished	August 22, 2024	iQiyi WeTV Netflix Viki GagaOOLala	某某 The On1y One		12	
Finished	June 27, 2025	GTV Drama SET Taiwan iQiyi Rakuten TV GagaOOLala VBL Series YouTube Channel	靈魂約定 The Promise of the Soul	Martin Wong, Kenji Fan, Din Lee, Wei Hung, Yaron Qiu, Kelly Liao, Mariko Okubo, Nelson Ji	12	

== See also ==
- List of Taiwanese dramas from 2000 to 2010
- List of Taiwanese dramas from 2011 to 2020
- Taiwanese drama
- Television in Taiwan
- List of Chinese-language television channels
- List of Taiwanese television series
- List of BL dramas
