= List of KO One episodes =

This is the episode list of the series KO One (終極一班). It aired on GTV.

No.	Title	Original release date
1	"Episode 1"	November 26, 2012
Story begins with Wang Ya Se (KO 3) and Ding Xiao Yu (KO 4) join the class Zhong Ji Yi Ban led by Wang Da Dong (KO 3), and trouble begins.
2	"Episode 2"	December 3, 2012
Da Dong, Ya Se and Xiao Yu become friends. Da Dong promises his homeroom teacher to avoid getting into fights and make sure to get the rest of the class into college.
3	"Episode 3"	December 10, 2012
The homeroom teacher gets kidnapped by her little brother's former teacher, who's become a total psycho. The class now works together to find their teacher. Da Dong's childhood best friend, Lei Ke Si, returns.
4	"Episode 4"	December 17, 2012
The class find out that Lei Ke Si has gone poor and is working in a pub, and they all decide to help get him out. However, Ya Se suspects something strange from Lei Ke Si and decides to go on a private investigation afterwards.
5	"Episode 5"	December 24, 2012
Ya Se finds out that Lei Ke Si is actually the owner of the pub he was presumably working at and revealed himself as KO 2 - the second strongest fighter on the KO Rank. Lei Ke Si plays mischievous tricks on Ya Se and almost gets him and Da Dong into a fight. Ya Se leaves the school the promise "I'll be back."
6	"Episode 6"	December 31, 2012
An Qi, a girl from Da Dong and Lei Ke Si's past returns to Taiwan and joins their class. Xiao Yu believes that Ya Se is innocent and decides to keep on eye on Lei Ke Si to find a way to prove his innocence.
7	"Episode 7"	January 7, 2013
Lei Ke Si tries to steal An Qi's heart by attacking their homeroom teacher and letting Da Dong think that An Qi is responsible. However, the teacher proves her innocence. When An Qi reveals the reason to why she likes Da Dong so much, Lei Ke Si decides to take on full action - to kill both Da Dong and An Qi.
8	"Episode 8"	January 14, 2013
Lei Ke Si's identity as KO 2 is finally revealed to everyone. After he leaves, An Qi feels responsible for causing the rivalry between Lei Ke Si and Da Dong and decides to leave. Meanwhile, Lei Ke Si's revelation proves Ya Se's innocence and returns to school. Da Dong, with some help from Ya Se and Xiao Yu, works up his courage to tell An Qi his true feelings for her.
9	"Episode 9"	January 21, 2013
Da Dong and An Qi are finally together. But there's something strange with Xiao Yu, he is extremely interested in An Qi. Also, the homeroom teacher is dating a seventeen-year-old college student.
10	"Episode 10"	January 28, 2013
The teacher's relationship with her boyfriend makes Da Dong jealous and starts causing trouble in the class to upset her.
11	"Episode 11"	February 4, 2013
An Qi feels upset over Da Dong's mixed-up feelings and runs to Xiao Yu for comfort. Meanwhile, Da Dong finds out that his teacher's boyfriend is trying to reconnect with his birth mother and decides to help with the entire class.
12	"Episode 12"	February 11, 2013
After Da Dong find out that Xiao Yu has given his cellphone number to An Qi, he finds out that Xiao Yu is also in love with her. This causes a serious relationship problem between the two best friends. Meanwhile, a new mystical force appears.
13	"Episode 13"	February 18, 2013
The team works together to protect each other from the mysterious force. Xiao Yu breaks a hand in a battle. The team figures out that one of the enemies they encounter is their teacher's supposedly dead little brother, who is also KO 1 - the strongest fighter on the KO Rank.
14	"Episode 14"	February 25, 2013
The three boys realize that their new enemy's target is really their teacher because she has the potential to become an extremely powerful warrior. The members of Da Dong's parents' team take his teacher to safety. Meanwhile, Da Dong gets attacked. Da Dong's parents manage to store a device to protect Da Dong from the needle that was injected in him by the enemy. An Qi meets Xiao Yu and tells him that she decides to return to America. Da Dong finds out about her leaving a week after she left and runs out to question Xiao Yu and the needle reacts immediately.
15	"Episode 15"	March 4, 2013
Da Dong's parents manage to save him on time and take him to a secret hospital for safety. Da Dong's parents and Ya Se and Xiao Yu figure out a way to remove the needle stored inside of Da Dong.
16	"Episode 16"	March 11, 2013
Two sisters arrive at the school: Cai Yun Han (KO 7) and Cai Wu Xiong (KO 10), who is extremely interested in Ya Se. Meanwhile, their friend Duan Chang Ren becomes their homeroom teacher.
17	"Episode 17"	March 18, 2013
Ya Se's weapon, the Sword in the Stone, is starting to have strange reactions, making him want to attack people when they frustrate him.
18	"Episode 18"	March 25, 2013
The mystery man then comment about Shi Huo powerful shield and approved of his power. The mystery man retreated. Everyone is surprised that the KO chart has been reshuffled and they each have a new, higher ranking in the chart. The newly KO.9 Shi Huo, revealed to have a battle point of 7,300 then bid goodbye to the group and left. Somewhere else, Ya Se's sword is starting to take him over, and Wu Xiong claims that she is the only person who can help him. But the problem is that he has to become her man in order to do so, and his first reaction is I'd rather die than let you save me.
19	"Episode 19"	April 1, 2013
Ya Se throws away his weapon, but it later returns and almost takes over him completely. Ji An reveals his identity as the Demon Fighter and attempts to vanquish Ya Se, but the other warriors arrive on time to stop him. At the last moment, Wu Xiong gives him her most valuable possession - the Bear Pearl.
20	"Episode 20"	April 8, 2013
Ya Se learns that Wu Xiong is aging to death by the loss of the Bear Pearl, and confirms that she is his girlfriend in order to make him fall in love with her and able to return the pearl. Meanwhile, Lei Ke Si returns.
21	"Episode 21"	April 15, 2006
Lei Ke Si helps give information to defeat their enemy. Ya Se finally returns the Bear Pearl to Wu Xiong and the sword's essence takes over him again. Their enemy, Hei Long, uses Ya Se as a pawn to become the evil lord of the world. But Da Dong, Ya Se, Xiao Yu and Lei Ke Si work together and defeat him. But in exchange of their powers.
