= List of Taiwanese dramas from 2000 to 2010 =

This is an incomplete list of Taiwanese Dramas released and televised from 2000 to 2010. It is organized by year of release date and in alphabetical order.

List of Taiwanese dramas: 2000 to 2010 • 2011 to 2020

== 2000s ==
=== 2000 to 2005 ===
English Title	Chinese Title	Cast	Network(s)	Note(s)/Ref(s)
2000
Big Hospital, Little Doctor	大醫院小醫師		PTS	
2001
Lavender	薰衣草	Tammy Chen, Ambrose Hsu, Joe Chen	TTV; SETTV	
Meteor Garden	流星花園	Barbie Hsu, Jerry Yan, Vic Chou, Vanness Wu, Ken Chu	CTS	
Meteor Rain	流星雨	Jerry Yan, Vic Chou, Vanness Wu, Ken Chu, Rainie Yang	CTS	
Poor Prince	貧窮貴公子	Vic Chou, Ken Chu, Annie Yi, Edward Ou, Will Liu	CTS	
2002
Meteor Garden II	流星花園 II	Barbie Hsu, Jerry Yan, Vic Chou, Vanness Wu, Ken Chu	CTS	
My MVP Valentine	MVP情人	Angela Chang, Joe Chen, 5566 members	SETTV	
Peach Girl	蜜桃女孩	Annie Wu, Vanness Wu, Kenji Wu	CTS	
Tomorrow	愛情白皮書	Rainie Yang, Shawn Yue, Christine Fan, Eddie Peng	CTV	
2003
At Dolphin Bay	海豚灣戀人	Angela Chang, Ambrose Hsu, Wallace Huo	SETTV	
Crystal Boys	孽子	Fan Chi-wei, Tony Yang, Joseph Chang, Wu Huai Zhong	PTS	38th Golden Bell Awards: Best Television Series; Best Actress (Shu-qin Ke)
Love Storm	狂愛龍捲風	Vic Chou, Vivian Hsu, Ken Chu, Beatrice Hsu	CTS	
The Rose	蔷薇之恋	Ella Chen, Jerry Huang, Joe Cheng, Joelle Lu, Cecilia Yip	TTV	39th Golden Bell Awards: Best Television Series
Westside Story	西街少年	Tony Sun, Wallace Huo, Esther Liu, Cyndi Wang	CTS SETTV	
2004
100% Senorita	千金百分百	Chen Qiao En, Penny Lin, Wallace Huo, Deric Wan	SETTV	
Amor de Tarapaca	紫藤戀	Han Jae-suk, Ruby Lin	CTS	
Heaven's Wedding Gown	天國的嫁衣	Cyndi Wang, Leon Jay Williams, Ming Dao	CTS SETTV	
In Love with A Rich Girl	愛上千金美眉	Joe Chen, Jason Hsu, Lisa Lee-Yan Wong, Zhou Li Cen	TTV	
Love Contract	愛情合約	Ariel Lin, Mike He	TVBS-G	
Love of the Aegean Sea	情定愛琴海	Alec Su, Chae Rim, Peter Ho		
Mars	戰神MARS	Vic Chou, Barbie Shu, Xiu Jie Kai, Megan Lai	CTS	
The Outsiders	鬥魚	Michael Zhang, Joelle Lu, Dylan Kuo, Ady An, Lan Cheng Long	GTV	
The Outsiders II	鬥魚 II	Show Lo, Michael Zhang, Joelle Lu, Dylan Kuo, Ady An	GTV	
The Unforgettable Memory	意難忘	Wang Shixian, Zhang Fengshu, Xu Heng	FTV	Longest primetime drama ever in Taiwan history, (526 episodes in total); Highest viewership of all TV shows in Taiwan when it debuted at primetime on September 22, 2004 till its ending on September 28, 2006 almost daily (hitting above 10); 41st Golden Bell Awards: Best Supporting Actor (Xu Heng)
2005
Devil Beside You	惡魔在身邊	Rainie Yang, Mike He, Kingone Wang	CTV; ETTV	
It Started with a Kiss	惡作劇之吻	Ariel Lin, Joe Cheng, Jiro Wang	CTV; GTV	
Green Forest My Home	綠光森林	Esther Liu, Leon Jay Williams, Ethan Juan, Song Zhi Ai	SETTV	
Holy Ridge	聖稜的星光	Tony Yang, Li Kang Yi, Jason Chang	CTV	41st Golden Bell Awards: Best Television Series; Best Cinematography
KO One	終極一班	Aaron Yan, Jiro Wang, Calvin Chen, Danson Tang, Wu Chun,	GTV	
Mr Fighting	格鬥天王	Tony Sun, Zax Wang, Esther Liu, Joanne Tseng	Taiwan Television	
Reaching For The Stars	真命天女	Ella Chen, Hebe Tien, Selina Jen, Anthony Guo, Chen Zhi Kai	CTS	
The Prince Who Turns into a Frog	王子變青蛙	Joe Chen, Ming Dao, Sam Wang, Joyce Chao	TTV; SETTV	

=== 2006 to 2010 ===
English Title	Chinese Title	Cast	Network(s)	Note(s)/Ref(s)
2006
A Game About Love	剪刀 石頭 布	Joe Chen, Michael Zhang, Sam Wang, Gina Lin	CTS	
Angel Lover	天使情人	Ming Dao, Bianca Bai, Alex To, Coco Jiang	STAR Chinese Channel	
Bump Off Lover	愛殺17	Angela Chang, Julian Yang Shi Xuan, Lu Ting Wei, Zhang Shan Jie	CTV; GTV	41st Golden Bell Awards: Best Supporting Actress (Shen Shihua)
Dangerous Mind	危險心靈	Huang He, Guang Yun, Lee Lieh, Jack Kao	PTS	42nd Golden Bell Awards: Best Television series; Best Actor (Huang He)
Hanazakarino Kimitachihe	花樣少年少女	Ella Chen, Wu Chun, Jiro Wang, Danson Tang	CTS	
Knock Knock Loving You	敲敲愛上你	Dylan Kuo, Ming Dao, Maggie Wu	CTS	
Love Queen	恋爱女王	Genie Chuo, Cheryl Yang, Godfrey Gao, Chen De Lie, Hong Xiao Ling	CTS	
The Magicians of Love	愛情魔髮師	Ming Dao, Joanne Zeng, Sam Wang, Jacky Zhu		
Silence	深情密碼	Vic Zhou, Park Eun-hye, Andy Hui, Kingone Wang	CTV; ETTV	
Smiling Pasta	微笑 Pasta	Cyndi Wang, Nicholas Teo, Gino, Zhao Hong Qiao	TTV; SETTV	
The Hospital	白色巨塔	Jerry Yan, Leon Dai, Janine Chang	CTV	42nd Golden Bell Awards: Best Supporting Actor (Chang Kuo-chu; (Note: Chang Kuo-chu was incorrectly announced as the winner hence both actors were awarded as winners.) Best Director (Cài Yuè Xun)
The Spirit of Love	愛	Chen Meifeng, Fon Cin, June Tsai, Jimmy Ni	FTV	
Tokyo Juliet	東方茱麗葉	Wu Chun, Ariel Lin	GTV	
2007
Bull Fighting	鬥牛 • 要不要	Hebe Tien, Mike He, Lee Wei	TTV; SETTV	
Brown Sugar Macchiato	黑糖瑪奇朵	Lollipop F members, Wang Zi, Liljay, Hey Girl members	FTV; STAR Chinese Channel	
Corner With Love	轉角＊遇到愛	Barbie Shu, Show Lo	CTV	
General Xu Pangxing	大將徐傍興	James Wen, Wang Juan		43rd Golden Bell Awards: Best Supporting Actress - (Wang Juan)
I Want to Become A Hard Persimmon	我要变成硬柿子	Yang Ming Wei, Cynthia Wang, Chen De Lie, Ivy Chen, Godfrey Gao	CTS	
Mean Girl Ah Chu	恶女阿楚	Joanne Zeng, Sam Wang, Chen Yi, Genie Chuo	CTS	
My Lucky Star	放羊的星星	Jimmy Lin, Leon Jay Williams, Yoo Ha-na	TTV; SETTV	
Queen's	至尊玻璃鞋	Tang Zhen Gang, Joelle Lu	CTS; GTV	
Summer x Summer	熱情仲夏	Joe Cheng, Wu Xiong, Ethan Juan	CTS	
Sweet Relationship	美味關係	Vic Chou, Patty Hou, Alan Kuo, Megan Lai	CTS	
Romantic Princess	公主小妹	Wu Chun, Angela Chang, Calvin Chen, Genie Chuo	CTV	
The X-Family	終極一家	Calvin Chen, Jiro Wang, Aaron Yan	GTV	
Wayward Kenting	我在垦丁*天气晴	Eddie Peng, Lee Kang-Yi, Sean, Ethan Juan	PTS	43rd Golden Bell Awards: Best Writing for a Television Series
Why Why Love	換換愛	Rainie Yang, Mike He, Kingone Wang	CTS	
Ying Ye 3 Jia 1	樱野3加1	Joe Chen, Jason Hsu, Ming Dao, Jerry Hwang	TTV; SET Metro	
Your Home is My Home	歡喜來逗陣	Miao Ke Li, Zhang Yu, Sam Wang, Zhang Chen Guang	CTS	
2008
Fated to Love You	命中注定我愛你	Joe Chen, Ethan Ruan, Baron Chen, Bianca Bai	TTV	Highest single episode average rating of all time for episode 20; 43rd Golden Bell Awards: Best Television series; Best Marketing Programme
Honey and Clover	蜂蜜幸運草	Lego Li, Chiaki Ito, Eddie Peng, Joe Cheng, Janine Chang	CTS	
Hot Shot	籃球火	Show Lo, Jerry Yan, Wu Chun	CTV	
Invincible Shan Bao Mei	無敵珊寶妹	Nicholas Teo, Amber Kuo, Roy Chiu	TTV; SETTV	
Letter 1949	我在1949等你	Queenie Tai, Lin Yo Wei, Alien Huang, Hawick Lau	CTS	
Miss No Good	不良笑花	Will Pan, Rainie Yang, Dean Fujioka	CTS	
Mysterious Incredible Terminator	霹靂MIT	Gui Gui, Aaron Yan, Christine Fan, Alien Huang	GTV	
Police et vous	波麗士大人			
The Legend of Brown Sugar Chivalries	黑糖群俠傳	Wang Zi, Sam Wang, Xiao Xun, Ah Ben, Ya Tou, Ah Wei	Star TV	
Love or Bread	我的億萬麵包	Ariel Lin, Joe Cheng	CTV	
Prince + Princess 2	王子看見二公主	Ken Hung, Annie Chen, Dylan Kuo, Michael Zhang	CTS	
Rolling Love	翻滾吧！蛋炒飯	Jiro Wang, Genie Chuo, Danson Tang	CTV	
So I'm Not Handsome	原來我不帥	JJ Lin, Nicky Lee, Michael Zhang, Alice Tzeng	Star TV; FTV	
They Kiss Again	惡作劇2吻	Ariel Lin, Joe Cheng, Jiro Wang	CTV	43rd Golden Bell Awards: Best Actress - Ariel Lin
Wish To See You Again	這裡發現愛	Vic Zhou, Ken Chu, Kingone Wang, Michelle Chen, Terri Kwan	CTS	
2009
Autumn's Concerto	下一站，幸福	Vanness Wu, Ady An, Ann Hsu, Chris Wu	TTV	
Black And White	痞子英雄	Vic Chou, Mark Chao, Ivy Chen, Janine Chang	PTS	44th Golden Bell Awards: Best Television series, Best Actor (Mark Chao), Best Director (Cai Yuexun) and more
Easy Fortune Happy Life	福氣又安康	Joe Chen, Lan Cheng Long, Roy Chiu, Jocelyn Wang	TTV; SETTV	
Hi My Sweetheart	海派甜心	Rainie Yang, Show Lo	CTS; GTV	45th Golden Bell Awards: Best Actress (Rainie Yang)
K.O.3an Guo	終極三國	George Hu, Xiu, Kirsten Ren, Wu Xiong	GTV; FTV	
Knock Knock Loving You	敲敲愛上你	Ming Dao, Maggie Wu, Dylan Kuo	CTS; GTV	
Momo Love	桃花小妹	Jiro Wang, Cyndi Wang, Wong JingLun, Calvin Chen, Ken Chu	CTV	
My Queen	敗犬女王	Ethan Juan, Cheryl Yang, Sylvia Yang, Lene Lai	TTV; SETTV	44th Golden Bell Awards: Best Channel Advertising
Starlit	心星的淚光	Jerry Yan, Terri Kwan, Alice Tzeng, Chen Zhi Kai	PTS	
The Year of Happiness and Love	那一年的幸福時光	James Wen, Amber Kuo	TTV; SETTV	
ToGetHer	愛就宅一起	Rainie Yang, Jiro Wang, George Hu	CTV	
2010
Channel-X	國民英雄	Joe Cheng, Amber Kuo	TTV; SETTV	
Down With Love	就想賴著妳	Ella Chen, Jerry Yan, Michael Zhang	CTV	
P.S Man	偷心大聖PS男	Lan Cheng-lung, Sonia Sui, Bianca Bai	TTV; SETTV	
Endless Love	愛∞無限	Will Pan, Sandrine Pinna, Lin Yo Wei	CTS; GTV	46th Golden Bell Awards: Best Actor (Will Pan)
Gloomy Salad Days	死神少女	Aaron Yan, Serena Fang, Wang Zi, Mao Di	PTS	
Happy and Love Forever	幸福一定強	Ming Dao, Annie Chen, Li Yi Feng	Anhui TV	
Love Buffet	愛似百匯	Aaron Yan, Calvin Chen, Reen Yu	FTV	
Lucky Days	第二回合我愛你	Tammy Chen, Chris Wang	TTV; SETTV	
Pandamen	熊貓人	Jay Chou, Yuhao Zhan, Devon Song	CTS	
Scent of Love	就是要香戀	Viter Fan, Alice Tzeng, Kingone Wang, Ann Hsu, Li Li Qun	CTV; GTV	
Summer's Desire	泡沫之夏	Barbie Shu, Huang Xiao Ming, Peter Ho	FTV	
The Fierce Wife	犀利人妻	Sonia Sui, James Wen, Chris Wang, Amanda Zhu	TTV; SETTV	46th Golden Bell Awards: Best Supporting Actress (Amanda Chu)
Volleyball Lover	我的排队情人	Godfrey Gao, Annie Chen, Lan Jun Tian, Cindy Song	CTS	
Zhong Wu Yan	鍾無艷	Cheryl Yang, Ming Dao, Chris Wu	TTV; SETTV	

== See also ==
- Taiwanese drama
- List of Taiwanese dramas from 2011 to 2020
- List of Taiwanese dramas from 2021 to present
- Television in Taiwan
- List of Chinese-language television channels
- List of Taiwanese television series
