= Amanda Chou =

Taiwanese actress

- 周曉涵
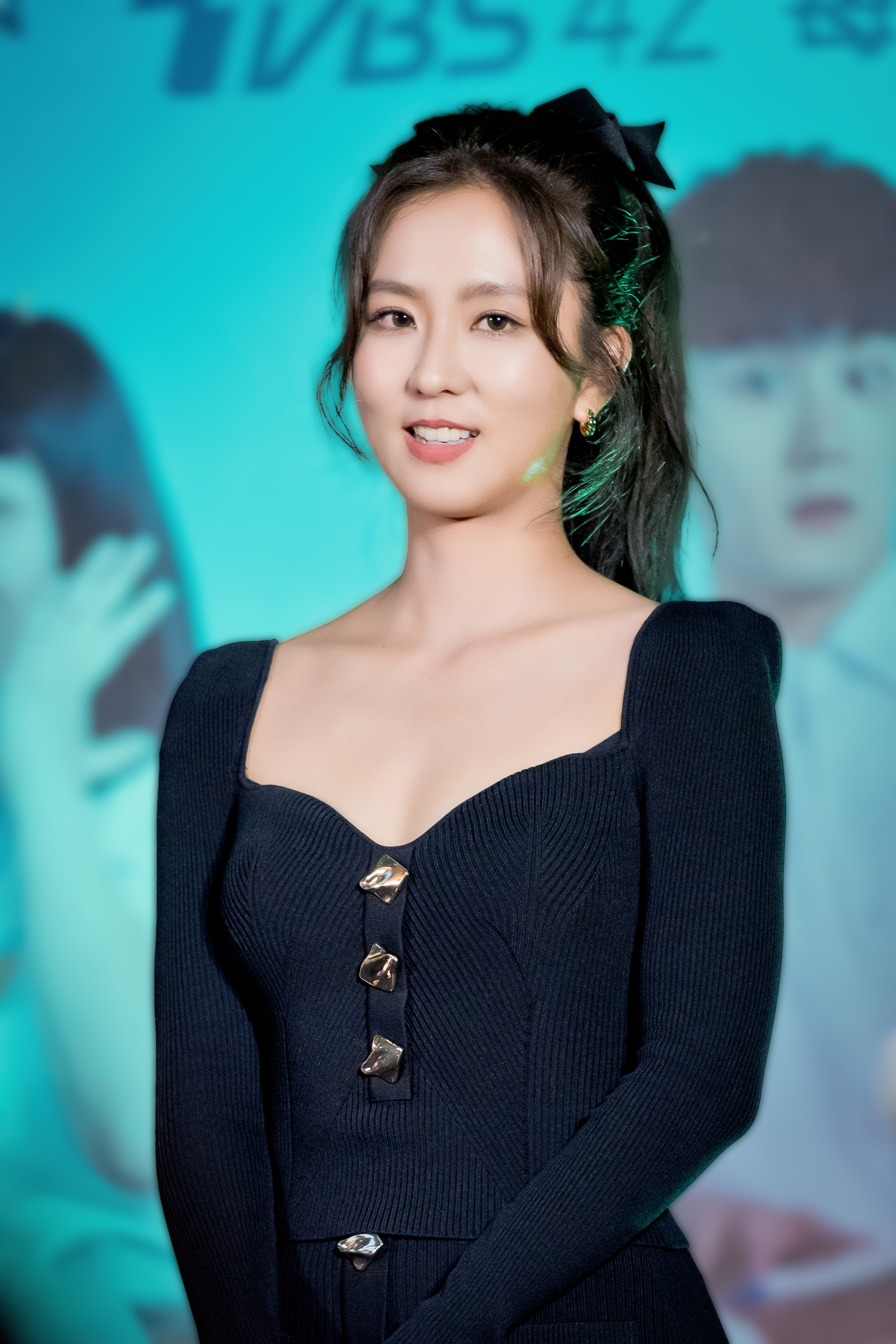
- Amanda Chou in August 2022
- Born: 8 August 1984 (age 42); Taipei, Taiwan
- Education: Feng Chia University
- Occupation: actress
- Years active: 2005–present

Chinese name
- Traditional Chinese: 周曉涵
- Simplified Chinese: 周晓涵
Transcriptions
Standard Mandarin
- Hanyu Pinyin: Zhōu Xiǎohán
- Wade–Giles: Chou Hsiao-han

Amanda Chou Hsiao-han (traditional Chinese: 周曉涵; simplified Chinese: 周晓涵; pinyin: Zhōu Xiǎohán) is a Taiwanese actress.

== Filmography ==
=== Television series ===
Year	English title	Original title	Role	Network	Notes
2006	White Robe of Love	白袍之戀	Xiao Ai	CTS	
2007	Queen's	至尊玻璃鞋	Cai Ke Er	CTS	
2007	The Teen Age	18禁不禁	Liang Pei Jun	CTV, GTV Variety Show	
2008	The Legend of Brown Sugar Chivalries	黑糖群俠傳	Tian Shan Tong Lao	Star Chinese Channel	
2008	Mr Sandwich	三明治先生	Sun Jia Lin	CTS	
2009	Knock Knock Loving You	敲敲愛上你	Xiao Bu	CTS	
2010	My Class	我的這一班	Zhou Ya Qi	PTS	
2010	Down With Love	就想賴著妳	Xu Ya Ling	CTV, GTV Variety Show	
2011	I, My Brother	我和我的兄弟·恩	Fen Ni (Tiffany)	CTV	
2011	Who's The One	我的完美男人	A Zhui	TTV	
2011	Symphony of Fate	命運交響曲	Jiang Ying Fan	AHTV, Shenzhen TV	
2012	The Diamond's Dream	一克拉夢想	Liu Yun Xi	ZJTV	
2012	Confucius	智勝鮮師	Yang Ting	CTV, GTV Variety Show	
2013	Two Fathers	兩個爸爸	Cai Shu Fei	SET Metro, EBC Variety	
2013	Shining Days	璀璨人生	Liu Xiao Hui	Hunan TV	
2013	Love Family	有愛一家人	Zhang Yin Yin	SET Metro, EBC Variety	
2014	Chou Zhen	湊陣	Chen Qiu Fen	PTS	
2014	Go, Single Lady	上流俗女	Han Han	ZJTV, CTV, GTV Variety Show	
2014	Say Again Yes I Do	再說一次我願意	Liang Man Ni	TTV, SET Metro, EBC Drama	
2014	Tie the Knot	媽咪的男朋友	Rima	SET Metro, EBC Variety	
2015	Love Cuisine	料理高校生	Yao Xin Ti (Cindy)	SET Metro, EBC Variety	
2015	Bromance	愛上哥們	Fan Xiao Qing	TTV, SET Metro	
2016	Love @ Seventeen	我和我的十七歲	Bai Shu Lei	TTV, EBC Variety TTV	
2016	Love By Design	必勝練習生	Miss Zhou	TTV, EBC Variety TTV	Cameo
2017	Happy Valentine's Day	我的狐仙老婆	Ma Yi Xuan	Youku	
2017	Lion Pride	獅子王強大	Wang Qiang Wei	TTV, EBC Variety TTV	
2018	Campus Heroes	高校英雄傳	Lu Da Xiang's Ex	TTV, SET Metro, TTV	Cameo
2018	Wuda's Girls	武大的小姐姐們	Xi Shi	Youku	
2019	My Hero, My Daddy	必勝大丈夫	Huang Tian Lam	SET Metro	
2019	Big Thing	一起幹大事	Zhou Xiao Han	TTV, GTV Variety Show	Cameo
2020	The Devil Punisher	天巡者	Qing Guang-wang	SETTV	
2024	Game On	遊戲開始		TVBS	

=== Film ===
Year	English title	Original title	Role	Notes
2018	The Outsiders	鬥魚	Grid girl	Cameo
2018	Monga 2018	艋舺之江湖再現	Qiao An	iQiyi
2019	Nina Wu	灼人秘密	Girl No.2	
