= Nikita Shu =

Taiwanese singer, actress and television presenter

- 舒子晨
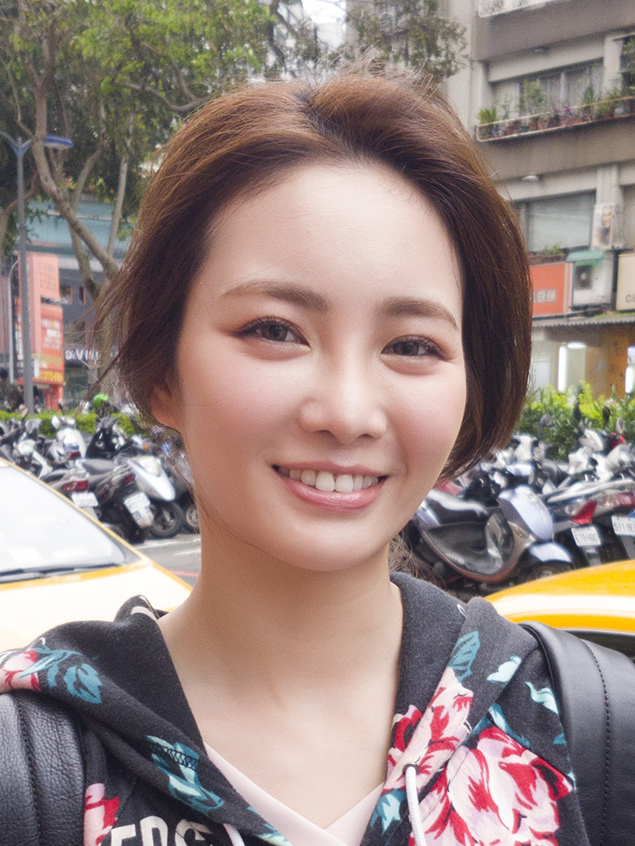
- Born: 6 May 1991 (age 35); Sanchong District, Taipei County (now Sanchong District, New Taipei City), Taiwan Province, Taiwan
- Other names: Zichen (子晨 Zichén); Xiao Xiejinyan (小謝金燕 Xiǎo Xièjīnyàn); Nikita; Xiao Song Huiqiao (小宋慧喬 Xiǎo Sòng Huìqiáo); Marksman – Sanjing Chen (三井晨 Sānjǐng Chén; Sanjing Shou/Mitsui Hisashi (三井壽)
- Citizenship: Taiwan
- Education: Fu Jen Catholic University Master of Mass Communication Research
- Occupations: Artist; actress
- Years active: 2009—
- Agent: B2 Studio Mi Rabbit Entertainment

Nikita Shu (舒子晨 Shūzi Chén, born 6 May 1991), real name Chen Yingying (陳盈穎 Chén Yíngyǐng), is a Taiwanese singer, actress and television presenter. She appeared in a fixed team in the variety show University. She participated in the TV draft show Chaoji Mo Wang Dadao 2, in which she finished sixth place, with dancing, pole dancing, and cooperation. In 2016, she formed the group Fangui Xiaojie with Lu Yu-ling and Kang Yin-yin; and later made a solo single in 2015: Princess of Iron. She released a personal photo album from the beginning of 2017, by Sharp Point Publishing. In mid-2017, she is the innovative programme assistant of presenter Lin Yu-Chih in Tongxue! Gao Shenme Gui?; and at the end of 2017, she co-presented Ruby Hsu and Blackie Chen in Shangban Zhe Dang Shì.

== Discography ==
=== Singles ===
- 2015 Princess of Iron

== Filmography ==
=== TV series ===
Year	Channel	Title	Role
2015	LETV	PMAM Desire Club	Tong Tong
2017	Da Ai Drama	Love's Horizons	Li Shuzhu

=== Films ===
Year	Title	Role
2016	David Loman 2	Golden Horse Award actress
2016	Go! Crazy Gangster	Zhu

=== Presenting ===
Year	Title	Channel
2017	Huan You Shijie 800 Tian	Alda Comprehensive Station, Alda Theatre
2017	Tongxue! Gao Shenme Gui	Eight comprehensive stations (co-presented with Lin Yu-Chih)
2018	Shangban Zhe Dang Shi	TVBS Happy Taiwan (co-presented with Blackie Chen)

=== Publications ===
Year	Type	Title
2017	Photo album	Shuzi Chen Nikita Chao Ji Xiezhen Quan Jilu

=== Programme announcements ===
- Variety Get Together (Formosa TV)
- The Gang of Kuo Kuan (SET Metro)
- Genius Go Go Go (CTS)
- Guanjun Renwu (Star Chinese Channel)
- Hot Door Night (SET Metro)
- Mr. Player (CTV or SET Metro)
- Super Entourage (CTi Variety or CTi Entertainment)
- Guimi Ai Luxing (TVBS Entertainment Channel)
- 18 Sui Bu Shui (CTi Variety)
- The Hunger Games (CTV)
- The Queen's Legendary Show (CTi Variety)
- Stylish Man - The Chef (SET Metro)
- The Poker Age (CTi Entertainment)
