= Much TV =

- Country: Republic of China (Taiwan)
- Broadcast area: Taiwan
- Network: Era Television

History
- Launched: 1994-03-15
- Replaced: Much TV (2000—present)
- Former names: 歡樂無線台 (1994-03-15—May 1995); TVIS (May 1995—1998-05-31); ERA SPORTS (1998-06-01—2000)

Availability

Streaming media
- I'm TV

Much TV (Chinese: 年代MUCH台) is a satellite cable channel operated by Era Television in Taiwan, launched on March 15, 1994 (as 歡樂無線台).
