= Love Family (TV series) =

- Promotional poster
- 有愛一家人
- Genre: Romance, Comedy, Family
- Created by: Sanlih E-Television
- Written by: Fang Yi De 方懿德; Wang Ruo Ting 王若婷; Chen Yi Lin 陳怡堎; Lin Pei Yu 林佩瑜
- Directed by: Lin Qing Zhen 林清振; Xie De Lin 謝德麟
- Starring: Chris Wang 宥勝; Serena Fang 房思瑜; Jack Lee 李運慶; Amanda Chou 周曉涵
- Opening theme: Don't Ask 不要問 by Della Ding Dang 丁噹
- Ending theme: I'm Not Qualified 我沒資格 by Jia Jia 家家
- Country of origin: Republic of China (Taiwan)
- Original language: Mandarin
- No. of seasons: 1
- No. of episodes: 72

Production
- Producers: Fang Xiao Ren 方孝仁; Xie Yi Sheng 謝益勝
- Production location: Taiwan
- Running time: 60 minutes
- Production companies: Sanlih E-Television 三立電視; Golden Bloom Production Co., Ltd. 金牌風華影像製作公司

Original release
- Network: SETTV
- Release: 29 October 2013 – 10 February 2014

Related
- Second Life 幸福選擇題; Fabulous 30 女人30情定水舞間

Love Family (Chinese: 有愛一家人; pinyin: yǒu ài yī jiā rén) is a 2013-2014 Taiwanese romantic-comedy television series produced by Sanlih E-Television. The 72-episode series starred Chris Wang and Serena Fang as the main leads, with Jack Lee and Amanda Chou as the main supporting leads. The Chinese title literally translates to "A Loving Family", which is in reference to the main female lead's character family. Filming took place from October 9, 2013 till January 29, 2014 and the series started airing while filming was still underway. First original broadcast began October 29, 2013 on SETTV channel airing weekly from Monday till Friday at 8:00-9:00 pm. The final episode aired on February 10, 2014.

== Synopsis ==
Rich heir Wan Sheng Ren has only 100 days to find a girl he briefly encountered when he was young that he calls "Little Angel" or else his parents will force him into an arranged marriage in order to inherit the family business. The problem with finding his "Little Angel" is he doesn't know her name or remember how to go to the place where he first met her since he was only seven then. One day he sees on television a family run inn with the same flower logo as the handkerchief "Little Angel" left for him. He heads out to find his "Little Angel", but when he arrives at the inn he is not sure who exactly is his "Little Angel", so he decides to apply for a job at the inn in order to try and figure that out.

== Plot summary ==
Wan Sheng Ren is the heir to the Wan Sing Hotel Group. Despite his family's wealthy background, he is a kind and gentle person who like to dress casually, open to trying regular everyday people food and not afraid to work hard. However being an only child his mother has made a rule that Sheng Ren must marry by the age of thirty in order to inherit the family business. Since he has no future wife prospect lined up, his mother offers to set him up on an arranged marriage. Not wanting to go through that process he ask his mother if he can find his "Little Angel", a little girl he met when he was young who tended to him after he scraped his knee, but he never got the chance to ask for her name or remember how to go back to the place where he met her. Only thing he has to remember her by is a handkerchief that she used to tend to his wound. By chance one day he sees on television a travel program covering a family run inn in the mountains that has the same logo as "Little Angel's" handkerchief. The next day he and his assistant Long Shi sets out to find his "Little Angel", when they arrive at the inn they encounter the unpleasant young lady Xu You Ai, that they had met the day before at the megamarket.

Xu You Ai is the oldest daughter of the Xu family and owns the Happy House Inn. She is frugal but can be unpleasant and demanding. She also wants to make the family inn successful by treating all the guess like part of her family when they stay there. She meets Wan Sheng Ren at the megamarket. The two start off at the wrong foot because of her competitive nature she thinks he is one of the shoppers trying to fight with her for the hourly store sale item. However, when the market announces a couples only contest to win 10 cases of instant ramen noodles, You Ai involuntarily has Sheng Ren be her partner in order to enter the contest. After winning the contest she only gives Sheng Ren six packets of noodles out of all the 10 cases they have won. When Sheng Ren is hired as a helping hand at the inn she works him to the bone in hard labor.

Not knowing who his "Little Angel" is Sheng Ren and Shi pretends to be answering the help wanted at the inn as helping hands to work at the inn and hide their true identities until they can figure out which young lady is his "Little Angel". Unpleasant and fierce oldest daughter Xu You Ai, soft-spoken middle daughter Xu You Qing who is also a mother, spoiled youngest daughter Xu You Meng who has a spending problem, and You Ai's best friend Zhang Yin Yin who is blunt and opinionated.

== Cast ==
=== Main cast ===
- Chris Wang 宥勝 as Wan Sheng Ren 萬聖仁
- Serena Fang 房思瑜 as Xu You Ai 許有愛
- Jack Lee 李運慶 as Long Shi 龍十
- Amanda Chou 周曉涵 as Zhang Yin Yin 張茵茵

=== Supporting cast ===
==== Happy House Inn (Xu family) ====
- Shen Meng-sheng 沈孟生 as Xu Han Yuan 許漢元
- Linda Liu 劉瑞琪 as Lin Zhao Jun 林昭君
- Yin Fu 茵芙 as Xu You Qing 許有情
- Rabbit Yang 楊可涵 as Xu You Meng 許有夢
- Eason Chao 趙乙丞 as Wang Yu Lun 王宇倫

==== Wan Sing Hotel Group (Wan family) ====
- Guan Yong 關勇 as Wan Tian Long 萬天龍
- Lin Xiu Jun 林秀君 as Lou Xiao Feng 羅曉楓

==== Zhang family ====
- Yen Chia Le 顏嘉樂 as Wang Xiu Xian 王秀賢
- Sean Lee 邵翔 as Zhang Han Wen 張翰文

==== Extended casts ====
- Lin Wei Yi 林惟毅 as Zhuang Kai Hua 莊開華
- Zhao Jie 趙杰 as Wang Shun Cheng 王順成
- Lin Jun Yong 林埈永 (綠茶) as Song Zheng Qi 宋正期
- Shaun Chen 陳泓宇 as Li Cong Wei 李崇威
- Hope Lin 林可彤 as Fang An Ting 方安婷

=== Guest role ===
- Albee Liu 劉堇萱 as Nurse 護士
- Huang Taian 黃泰安 as Male tenant 男房客
- Chang Kuo-tung 張國棟 as Chen Zhi Xiong 陳志雄
- Yu Jia An 于家安 as Jin Hua 金花
- Mandy Tao 陶嫚曼 as Momo Tao Zhi 陶子
- Gina Lim 林利霏 as Yin Jia Hui 尹家慧
- Irene 豆豆 as Ling Ling 玲玲
- Qin Zhen 蓁勤 as Grandmother 奶奶
- Paul Hsu 許騰方 as Andy
- Gao Zheng-peng 高振鵬 as Lo Yu Cheng 羅裕程
- Gloria 玓靜 as Ai Mi Li 愛蜜莉

== Soundtrack ==
- Don't Ask 不要問 by Della Ding Dang 丁噹
- I'm Not Qualified 我沒資格 by Jia Jia 家家
- Not Equal 不等於 by Jia Jia 家家
- Checkpoints 闖關 by Victor Wong 品冠
- Wide Shoulders 更寬的肩膀 by Victor Wong 品冠

== DVD release ==
* 24 March 2014 : Love Family (DVD) (Taiwan Version) - DVD All Region - Disc: 10 (Ep.1-72) - Publisher: Horng En Culture Co., Ltd.

Official Taiwan version of the drama DVD set comes in original Mandarin language and Chinese subtitles only.

* 12 March 2014 : Love Family (DVD) (Malaysia Version) - DVD All Region - Disc: 18 (Ep.1-72) - Publisher: Multimedia Entertainment SDN. BHD.

Malaysia version of the drama DVD set contains 18 disc with complete episodes 1 to 72, comes in original Mandarin language with Chinese, English and Malaysian subtitles.

== Broadcast ==
Network	Country	Airing Date	Timeslot
SETTV	Taiwan	October 29, 2013	Monday to Friday 8:00-9:00 pm
ETTV	Taiwan	October 29, 2013	Monday to Friday 10:00-11:00 pm
Astro Quan Jia HD	Malaysia	November 18, 2013	Monday to Friday 6:30-7:30 pm
StarHub TV	Singapore	December 5, 2013	Monday to Friday 7:00-8:00 pm
TVB J2	Hong Kong	April 21, 2014	Monday to Friday 7:30-8:30 pm

== Episode ratings ==
Competing dramas on rival channels airing at the same time slot were:
- TTV - Happy Dandelion, Teacher Gangstar
- SET - The Heart Of Woman, Ordinary Love
- FTV - Feng Shui Family
- CTS - Flowers In Fog, Heroes in Sui and Tang Dynasties, Legend of Lu Zhen, The Legend of Zhen Huan
- CTV - The Patriot Yue Fei, Cuo Dian Yuan Yang·Xi Dian Yuan Yang, In Love with Power, Father's Wish, Rainy Night Flower

Air Date	Episodes	Weekly Average Ratings	Rank
October 29, 2013 – November 1, 2013	1-4	1.26	4
November 4, 2013 – November 4, 2013	5-9	1.46	3
November 11, 2013 – November 15, 2013	10-14	1.59	3
November 18, 2013 – November 22, 2013	15-19	1.45	3
November 25, 2013 – November 29, 2013	20-24	1.70	3
December 2, 2013 – December 6, 2013	25-29	1.74	3
December 9, 2013 – December 13, 2013	30-34	1.89	3
December 16, 2013 – December 20, 2013	35-39	1.91	3
December 23, 2013 – December 27, 2013	40-44	1.80	3
December 30, 2013 – January 3, 2014^{1}	45-48	1.70	3
January 6, 2014 – January 10, 2014	49-53	1.67	3
January 13, 2014 – January 17, 2014	54-58	1.56	3
January 20, 2014 – January 24, 2014	59-63	1.70	3
January 27, 2014 – January 29, 2014^{2}	64-66	1.47	3
February 3, 2014 – February 7, 2014	67-71	1.80	3
February 10, 2014	72	2.78	3
Average ratings		1.72	

^Note 1:No episode was aired on December 31, 2013 due to SETTV airing New Year's Eve countdown special show.
^Note 2:Episodes were not broadcast on January 30 and 31, 2014 due to SETTV airing Chinese New Year's special programing.

== Awards and nominations ==
The 2013 Sanlih Drama Awards Ceremony were held on December 22, 2013 at Sanlih's headquarters and broadcasting studios at No. 159, Section 1, Jiuzong Rd, Neihu District Taipei City, Taiwan.

Year	Ceremony	Category	Nominee	Result
2013	2013 Sanlih Drama Awards 華劇大賞	Viewers Choice Drama Award	Love Family	Nominated
2013	2013 Sanlih Drama Awards 華劇大賞	Best Actor Award	Chris Wang	Nominated
2013	2013 Sanlih Drama Awards 華劇大賞	Best Screen Couple Award	Chris Wang & Serena Fang	Nominated
2013	2013 Sanlih Drama Awards 華劇大賞	Best Child Actor Award	Eason Zhao	Nominated
2013	2013 Sanlih Drama Awards 華劇大賞	Most Popular Overseas Award	Chris Wang	Nominated
2013	2013 Sanlih Drama Awards 華劇大賞	Weibo Popularity Award	Chris Wang	Nominated
2013	2013 Sanlih Drama Awards 華劇大賞	China Wave Award	Chris Wang	Won
