= Lion Pride =

2017 Taiwanese television series

- Promotional poster
- 獅子王強大
- Genre: Romance, Comedy, Mystery
- Created by: Eastern Television
- Written by: He Shu Ting 賀淑婷 (Screenwriter coordinator); Zhu Ying 諸英; Huang Zi Jie 黃姿潔
- Directed by: Chen Bao Zhong 陳保中
- Starring: Yen Tsao 曹晏豪; Amanda Chou 周曉涵; Kevin Liu 劉書宏; Peace Yang 陽靚
- Opening theme: 不愛你愛誰 by GTM
- Ending theme: No Retreat 不退 by Amuyi Lu 呂薔
- Country of origin: Taiwan
- Original language: Mandarin
- No. of episodes: 16

Production
- Producer: Yan Jia You 顏嘉佑
- Production location: Taiwan
- Running time: 90 minutes (Ep. 1-15); 95 minutes (Ep. 16)
- Production company: 6F Production 六樓映像製作有限公司

Original release
- Network: TTV; EBC Variety
- Release: 2 December 2017 – 24 March 2018

Related
- Jojo's World; Single Ladies Senior

Lion Pride (Chinese: 獅子王強大; pinyin: shīziwáng qiángdà; literally "Powerful Lion King") is a 2017 Taiwanese television series created and produced by Eastern Television. Starring Yen Tsao, Amanda Chou, Kevin Liu and Peace Yang as the main cast. Filming began in October 2017 and ended on February 12, 2018. The first original broadcast was on TTV every Saturday at 10:00 pm starting December 2, 2017.

== Synopsis ==
Two teachers hold polar opposite viewpoints about teaching and life. Wang Qiang Da is a mathematics teacher who approaches everything in front of him with logic and reasoning. Wang Qiang Wei is a history teacher at the same tutoring center who cares about the love of learning and making people happy around her.

When Qiang Da and Qiang Wei are brought together by a crime, they must work together to get to the bottom of what happened. What will they discover about themselves in the process?

== Cast ==
=== Main cast ===
- Yen Tsao 曹晏豪 as Wang Qiang Da 王強大
  - Max Kuo 郭大睿 as child Qiang Da
- Amanda Chou 周曉涵 as Wang Qiang Wei / Wang Qiao Wei 汪薔薇 / 汪巧薇
  - Cai Hai Yin 蔡海殷 as child Qiao Wei
- Kevin Liu 劉書宏 as Tie Bu Fan (Xiao Tie) 鐵不凡 (小鐵)
- Peace Yang 陽靚 as Lian Si De 連四德
  - Song Ting Yi 宋亭頤 as child Si De

=== Supporting cast ===
- Kenny Wen 溫國祥 as Chen Yu Fei (Ah Fei) 陳雲飛 (阿飛)
- Chao Tzu Chiang 趙自強 as Yan Zhang Tai 嚴長泰
  - Xiang Cheng Yu 向承寓 as young Zhang Tai
- Vince Kao 高英軒 as Zhang Ding Xuan 詹定宣
  - Huang Guan Zhi 黃冠智 as young Ding Xuan
- Wang Tzu-Chiang 王自強 as Li Da Shi 李大世
- Nolay Piho 林慶台 as Lin Shang Xun 林尚勳
  - Terry Jiang 江振愷 as young Shang Xun
- Hong Hua Wei 洪華葦 as Bai Wen Liang 白文良
  - Zhao Yi Hu 趙一虎 as young Wen Liang
- Da-her Lin 林鶴軒 as Zhou Wen Xin 周文信
- Erica Lai 賴柏蓉 as Niu Niu 妞妞
- Michael Yang 楊昇達 as Ceng Ren Yi 曾仁毅
- Leila Tang 唐雨韓 as Lin Qian Yu (Xiao Qian) 林倩玉 (小倩)
- Isabella Chien 簡莉紋 as Su Fei 蘇菲
- Zhu Jia Wei 朱家緯 as Bai Yi Xin (Xiao Xin) 白藝心 (小心)
- Hui Chih Yeh 葉蕙芝 as Gao Hui Lan 高蕙蘭
- Alina Cheng 鄭茵聲 as Guan Jing Jing 官晶晶
- Lu Wen Xue 魯文學 as Lian Zhong Yan 連仲彥
  - Oscar Chiu 邱志宇 as young Zhong Yan

=== Guest actors ===
- Zhu Sheng Ping 朱盛平 as Sun Xiao Shan 孫曉珊
- ?? as The Honest Guo 郭老實
- Wei Fan An 魏凡安 as Fan An 凡安
- Chen Yu 陳妤 as sound technician
- Li Ying Jie 李盈潔 as Yi Xin's mother
- Qin Si Lin 秦嗣林 as Qin Shi Lin 秦士林
- Qiao Yin Hao 喬殷浩 as Wang Yu Ming 王裕明
- Pan Zhen De 潘振德 as Wang Bo Yi 汪博義
- Xu Yi Ning 許逸寧 as Li Wan Yi 李婉儀
- Chen Yi Zhong 陳怡仲 as Gao Yu Ci 高育慈
- Eddy He 何怡德 as Zhang Guo Bin 張國賓
- Masha Pan 潘君侖 as He Wei Li 何威立
- Wish Chu 朱威旭 as Lawyer Ma 馬律師
- AJ Lai 賴煜哲 as Reporter Yang 楊記者
- Jane Hsu 許蓁蓁 as 客人
- Gu Yun Yun 古昀昀 as Si De's mother
- ?? as Li Song Lin 李嵩霖
- Mu Yan Yu 穆妍妤 as waiter

== Soundtrack ==
- 不愛你愛誰 by GTM
- No Retreat 不退 by Amuyi Lu 呂薔
- Safety First 安全第一 by Amuyi Lu 呂薔
- The Soul Trader 販賣靈魂的人 by Amuyi Lu 呂薔
- Signal 信號 by GTM
- As We Are by Three Laws

== Broadcast ==
Network	Country	Airing Date	Timeslot
TTV	Taiwan	December 2, 2017	Saturday 10:00-11:30 pm
EBC Variety	Taiwan	December 3, 2017	Sunday 10:00-11:30 pm
UNTV	Philippines	This 2021	TBA

== Episode ratings ==
Competing shows on rival channels airing at the same time slot were:

- CTS - Genius Go Go Go
- FTV - Just Dance
- CTV - Mr. Player

Air Date	Episode	Average Ratings	Rank
Dec 2, 2017	1	0.57	4
Dec 9, 2017	2	0.58	4
Dec 16, 2017	3	0.58	4
Dec 23, 2017	4	0.82	4
Dec 30, 2017	5	0.64	4
Jan 6, 2018	6	0.92	4
Jan 13, 2018	7	1.01	4
Jan 20, 2018	8	0.92	4
Jan 27, 2018	9	0.75	4
Feb 3, 2018	10	0.85	4
Feb 10, 2018	11	1.02	4
Feb 17, 2018: Airing of "13th KKBox Music Awards"
Feb 24, 2018	12	0.82	4
Mar 3, 2018	13	0.95	4
Mar 10, 2018	14	0.60	4
Mar 17, 2018	15	0.72	4
Mar 24, 2018	16	0.91	4
Average ratings		0.79	--
