= He Yi-hang =

Taiwanese television host and actor (1954–2019)

He Yi-hang 賀一航
- Born: Tseng Hsin-min; 31 July 1954
- Died: 3 June 2019 (aged 64); Beitou, Taipei, Taiwan
- Occupations: Television host, actor

Tseng Hsin-min (Chinese: 曾新民; pinyin: Zēng xīnmín; Pe̍h-ōe-jī: Chan Sin-bîn, 31 July 1954 – 3 June 2019), known professionally as He Yi-hang (Chinese: 賀一航; pinyin: Hè Yīháng; Pe̍h-ōe-jī: Hō It-hông), was a Taiwanese television host and actor. He won two Golden Bell Awards, in 2006 and 2016.

In 2004, a group of people attacked He with baseball bats, causing severe injuries to his leg, arm and face. He was linked to patronage of a brothel in August 2010, and charged with drug possession after a subsequent investigation. Shortly thereafter, he posted bail and was released from prison. He later reported to the Shilin Administrative Enforcement Agency and was questioned about tax evasion.

== Illness and death ==
He was diagnosed with stage III colorectal cancer in 2011, which eventually worsened due to his refusal of chemotherapy after a surgery. He died at Taipei Veterans General Hospital on 3 June 2019, aged 64 years old.

== Awards ==
- Golden Bell Awards – Best Host in a Variety Show (Musical Variety) (2006, Gold Nightclub)
- Golden Bell Awards – Best Supporting Actor in a TV Series (2016, Baby Daddy)
