= Yang Ko-han =

Taiwanese actress and producer

- Born: 17 September 1987; Taipei, Taiwan
- Died: 18 July 2015 (aged 27); Taipei, Taiwan
- Other name: small rabbit

Yang Ko-han (Chinese: 楊可涵; pinyin: Yáng Kěhán; 17 September 1987 – 18 July 2015) was a Taiwanese actress and producer. Born Yang Jiayu (楊家瑜), she was also known by the stage names White Rabbit, Yang Hsin-chiao (楊芯喬), and Yang Ko-fan (楊可凡). She started her entertainment career as part of Blackie's Teenage Club, known for her singing abilities. She later became and actress, and was nominated for the Best Supporting Actress Golden Bell Award in 2013. She hanged herself on July 6, 2015, and died from her injuries on July 18, 2015. Yang was posthumously nominated for another Golden Bell in 2015, but with The New World, this time as a Best Leading Actress.

== Early life ==
Yang graduated from Taipei Hwa Kang Private Art School. She suffered from asthma, heart disease, stomach problems, and frequent depression and needed long-term medication.

== Death ==
In 2014, Yang had a suicide attempt by sedatives overdose. On July 6, 2015, her boyfriend, Chang Ting-hu, found her hanging in their home. She was treated at Cathay General Hospital in Taipei, where she died on July 18, 2015. Per her last wish in a note she left, her family donated her organs. Her funeral was held on August 4 in Taipei. Days prior to her death, she posted two covers of songs hours before her death. She had been criticized by directors for her extreme interpretation of method acting, by way of simulated suicides, smoking and drug use despite poor medical history, for acting research purposes before.

== Selected filmography ==
- Mysterious Incredible Terminator
- Summer's Desire
- Office Girls
- Love Family
- The New World
