= Fabulous 30 =

- Promotional poster
- Also known as: Love in the House of Dancing Water
- 女人30情定水舞間
- Genre: Romance; Comedy
- Created by: Sanlih E-Television
- Written by: Huang Guo Su, Chu Hui Ping (ep. 6-25); Zheng Ying Ming (ep. 11-76); Xiao Zong Feng (ep. 26-59)
- Directed by: Zhang Jia Xian
- Starring: Vivi Lee; Ling Hung; Albee Huang; Danson Tang; Darren; Hans Chang
- Opening theme: "I'm There Beside You 我在你身旁" by Irene Luo
- Ending theme: "Years Are Like A Sharp Blade 歲月這把刀" by Freya Lim
- Country of origin: Taiwan
- Original language: Mandarin
- No. of seasons: 1
- No. of episodes: 76

Production
- Producers: Liang Han Hui; Xu Zhi Yi
- Production locations: Taiwan; Macau
- Running time: 60 minutes
- Production companies: Sanlih E-Television; Eastern Shine Production

Original release
- Network: SET Metro
- Release: 11 February – 27 May 2014

Related
- Love Family; Tie The Knot

Fabulous 30 (Chinese: 女人30情定水舞間; pinyin: nǚ rén 30 qíng dìng shuǐ wǔ jiān) is a 2014 Taiwanese television series produced by Sanlih E-Television. Starring Vivi Lee, Ling Hung, Albee Huang, Danson Tang, Darren and Hans Chang as the main cast. The Chinese title literally translates to "Woman 30 Love Dancing Water", which is in reference to the three main female characters. Filming took place from January 3, 2014 till May 24, 2014 and was filmed as the drama aired. First original broadcast began February 11, 2014 on SETTV channel, airing weekly from Monday till Friday at 8:00-9:00 pm. The last of the 76 episodes aired on May 27, 2014.

== Synopsis ==
Three friends in their thirties approach love and life differently. Worrywart Xu Wan Ting (Vivi Lee), lives life superstitiously. She was recently dumped by her boyfriend only to find out two month later that he is set to marry someone else. Career minded woman Jiang Wen Qi (Jennifer Hong), is fierce. She and her husband Lu Zhi Yuan (Hans Chang), decide to divorce but lies to their young daughter that she has to be away from home because of long business trips. Then there is their younger friend Xia Zhi Qin (Albee Huang), who is turning thirty soon. She is a free spirit who doesn't seem to want a committed relationship. To get away from everyday life and refresh herself from her recent divorce Wen Qi takes her friends on a getaway trip to Macau for fun and relaxation. At Macau the three ladies meet rich heir Edward Ai De Hua (Danson Tang), who has no plans to settle down and his homely friend Eric Lin Wei Zhong (Darren Qiu) who seems to only worry about his finances.

== Cast ==
=== Main cast ===
- Vivi Lee as Xu Wan Ting
- Ling Hung as Jiang Wen Qi
- Albee Huang as Xia Zhi Qin
- Danson Tang as Edward Ai De Hua
- Darren Chiu as Eric Lin Wei Zhong
- Hans Chang as Lu Zhi Yuan

=== Supporting cast ===
- Tan Ai-chen as Wu Su Mei
- Pei Hsiao Lan as Xu He Jin Gui
- Elten Ting as Lu Huang Yue Xiang
- Ivy Yin as Ceng Ying Hua
- Hsieh Chi-wen as Li Xiao Xu
- Ivy Shao as Wu Yi Le
- Coke Lee as Xu Han Cheng
- Amanda Liu as Hui Ting
- Kiki Lin as He Xiao Mei
- Angel Ho as Lu Jia Nei
- Irene Yang as Eva
- Garfield Chung as Xiao Ye
- Chu Lu-hao as Wang Da Qian
- Wasir Chou as Ding Wen Jie

=== Guest role ===
- Edison Huang as He Li Jie
- Jeanine Yang as Chen Yi Wen
- Lo Pei An as Mao Ruo Wang
- Patrick Lee as Edison
- Irene Luo as herself
- Wang Liang Jing as Feng Zi Qiang
- Que Xiao Yu as Xiao Ming
- Yin Zhong Min as Wang Jia Rui
- Lu Yi Lung as Xu Zheng Hong
- Ban Tie Xiang as Ai Da Xiong
- Livia Yin as Angel
- Grace Ko as Jiang Cai Ling

== Soundtrack ==
Fabulous 30 Original TV Soundtrack (OST)

Soundtrack album by Various artists
- Released: 20 May 2014
- Genre: Mandopop
- Language: Mandarin
- Label: Rock Records (TW) 滾石國際音樂股份有限公司

Fabulous 30 Original TV Soundtrack (OST) (女人30 情定水舞間 電視原聲帶) was released on May 20, 2014 by various artists under Rock Records (TW) label. It contains 10 tracks total. The opening theme "I'm There Beside You 我在你身旁" by Irene Luo 羅美玲 is not featured on the soundtrack. The closing theme is track 1 "Years Are Like A Sharp Blade 歲月這把刀" by Freya Lim 林凡.

=== Track listing ===
No.	Title	Singer(s)	Length
1.	"Years Are Like A Sharp Blade" (歲月這把刀)	Freya Lim 林凡	4:22
2.	"I’m Just Afraid Not Able To Be By Your Side" (我只是害怕不在妳身旁)	Nine Chen 陳零九	4:31
3.	"Is It Love Or Companion?" (是愛還是陪伴)	Shi Shi 孫盛希	4:10
4.	"Break Into Your Life, Give You A Love" (闖入你的生命，帶給你一段愛情)	Instrumental	3:55
5.	"I Want Your Thoughts Indefinitely" (我要你的無限期思念)	Instrumental	3:38
6.	"Love To Spend Years On, The Constant Pursuit Of Lost" (歲月在愛情上消磨，不斷追求與失去)	Instrumental	3:44
7.	"Well Over 30 Should Strive To Love" (過了三十也要努力愛情)	Instrumental	2:55
8.	"I Wish You Love Naughty Bickering, Is The Love?" (你情我願的調皮鬥嘴，是愛嗎？)	Instrumental	2:55
9.	"Love Your Brow" (情定你的眉宇間)	Instrumental	3:31
10.	"I Met You Down Eight Life Mold?" (遇見你倒了八輩子霉？)	Instrumental	3:31

The following songs are not featured in the official soundtrack CD release.

- I'm There Beside You 我在你身旁 by Irene Luo 羅美玲
- I'm There Beside You (Longing version) 我在你身旁 (心情思念版) by Irene Luo 羅美玲
- Can't Hold You 套不住 by Freya Lin 林凡 (Feat. Adrian Fu 符致逸)
- Don't Understand Loneliness (Sad version) 不懂寂寞 (分離悲傷版) by Irene Luo 羅美玲
- Don't Understand Loneliness 不懂寂寞 by Irene Luo 羅美玲
- I Don't Wanna Go by Jossie Qiu 裘芝
- Say Loudly I Love You 大聲說愛你 by Jossie Qiu 裘芝
- When I Think Of You 當我想著你的時候 by Mandy Tao 陶嫚曼
- One Take by Adrian Fu 符致逸

== Publications ==
* 3 May 2014 : S-Pop Vol. 16 May 2014 (華流 5月號/2014) - barcode 4717095574632 - Author: Sanlih E-Television 三立電視監製

For the May 2014 issue of S-Pop magazine, lead actors Danson Tang and Darren Qiu are featured on the cover of the regular edition of the magazine issue.

== DVD release ==
* 20 June 2014 : Fabulous 30 (Part I) (DVD) (Taiwan Version) - DVD All Region - Disc: 5 (Ep.1-36) - Publisher: Horng En Culture Co., Ltd. (TW)

Official Taiwan version of the drama DVD set part 1 showing episode 1 to 36, comes in original Mandarin language and Chinese subtitles only.

* 8 July 2014 : Fabulous 30 (Part II) (DVD) (Taiwan Version) - DVD All Region - Disc: 5 (Ep.37-76) - Publisher: Horng En Culture Co., Ltd. (TW)

Official Taiwan version of the drama DVD set part 2 showing episode 37 to 76, comes in original Mandarin language and Chinese subtitles only.

* 27 June 2014 : Fabulous 30 (DVD) (Malaysia Version) - DVD Region 3 - Disc: 19 (Ep.1-76) - Publisher: Multimedia Entertainment SDN. BHD.

Malaysia version of the drama DVD set contains 19 disc with complete episodes 1 to 76, comes in original Mandarin language with Chinese, English and Malaysian subtitles.

== Filming Locations ==
Fabulous 30 was filmed on location in Taiwan and Macao, China. The opening and closing sequence of the drama was filmed in Macao at the Virtual Aquarium Mermaids at City of Dreams and various tourist attraction in Macao.

== Development and casting ==
- On January 2, 2014 the main cast was unveiled at a press conference held on the outer grounds of SETTV headquarters.

== Broadcast ==
Network	Country	Airing Date	Timeslot
SETTV	Taiwan	February 11, 2014	Monday to Friday 8:00-9:00 pm
ETTV	Taiwan	February 11, 2014	Monday to Friday 10:00-11:00 pm
Astro Quan Jia HD	Malaysia	February 26, 2014	Monday to Friday 6:30-7:30 pm
StarHub TV	Singapore	March 17, 2014	Monday to Friday 7:00-8:00 pm
TVB J2	Hong Kong	September 24, 2014	Monday to Friday 12:30-1:30 pm
Amarin TV	Thailand	March 31, 2015	Monday to Friday 1:30-3:00 pm

== Episode ratings ==
Competing dramas on rival channels airing at the same time slot were:
- TTV - Teacher Gangstar, Sun After The Rain
- SET - Ordinary Love
- FTV - Feng Shui Family, Dragon Dance, Super M
- CTS - The Heaven Sword and Dragon Saber, Xuan-Yuan Sword: Scar of Sky, A Pillow Case of Mystery, Unique Flavor
- CTV - Rainy Night Flower, Inborn Pair, The Demi-Gods and Semi-Devils, Happiness on the Moon

Air Date	Episodes	Weekly Average Ratings	Rank
February 11–14, 2014	1-4	1.80	4
February 17–21, 2014	5-9	1.74	3
February 24–28, 2014	10-14	1.54	3
March 3–7, 2014	15-19	1.64	4
March 10–14, 2014	20-24	1.66	3
March 17–21, 2014	25-29	1.63	3
March 24–28, 2014	30-34	1.70	3
March 31-April 4, 2014	35-39	1.67	3
April 7–11, 2014	40-44	1.64	3
April 14–18, 2014	45-49	1.60	4
April 21–25, 2014	50-54	1.57	4
April 28-May 2, 2014	55-59	1.70	4
May 5–9, 2014	60-64	1.75	4
May 12–16, 2014	65-69	1.77	3
May 19–23, 2014	70-74	1.86	3
May 26–27, 2014	75-76	2.29	3
Average ratings		1.70	

== Awards and nominations ==
Year	Ceremony	Category	Nominee	Result
2014	2014 Sanlih Drama Awards 華劇大賞	Best Actor Award	Danson Tang	Nominated
2014	2014 Sanlih Drama Awards 華劇大賞	Best Actor Award	Darren Qiu	Nominated
2014	2014 Sanlih Drama Awards 華劇大賞	Best Actress Award	Vivi Lee	Nominated
2014	2014 Sanlih Drama Awards 華劇大賞	Best Actress Award	Ling Hung	Nominated
2014	2014 Sanlih Drama Awards 華劇大賞	Best Screen Couple Award	Danson Tang & Albee Huang	Nominated
2014	2014 Sanlih Drama Awards 華劇大賞	Best Kiss Award	Danson Tang & Albee Huang	Nominated
2014	2014 Sanlih Drama Awards 華劇大賞	Best Crying Award	Hans Chang & Ling Hung	Won
2014	2014 Sanlih Drama Awards 華劇大賞	Best Foolishly Award	Tan Ai-chen	Nominated
2014	2014 Sanlih Drama Awards 華劇大賞	China Wave Award	Danson Tang	Nominated
2014	2014 Sanlih Drama Awards 華劇大賞	Weibo Popularity Award	Danson Tang	Nominated
2014	2014 Sanlih Drama Awards 華劇大賞	Viewers Choice Drama Award	Fabulous 30	Nominated
