= Sun Shu-may =

- 孫淑媚
- Born: 9 January 1981 (age 44); Zihguan, Kaohsiung, Taiwan
- Education: Shu-Te University (BA)
- Occupations: Singer, actress, show host
- Years active: 1995–present

Chinese name
- Traditional Chinese: 孫淑媚
- Simplified Chinese: 孙淑媚
Transcriptions
Standard Mandarin
- Hanyu Pinyin: Sūn Shūmèi
- Musical career
- Also known as: May Sun
- Genres: Hokkien pop

Sun Shu-may (born 9 January 1981) is a Taiwanese pop singer, actress and TV host who sings predominantly in Taiwanese Hokkien. She has released 17 albums since 1995.

Sun won Golden Melody Award for Best Hokkien pop female artist in 2005, and was a finalist for the award in 2003, 2004, 2006, 2008, 2011, 2014, and 2015.
