= Gala Television =

Taiwanese TV broadcaster

Gala Television (GTV)
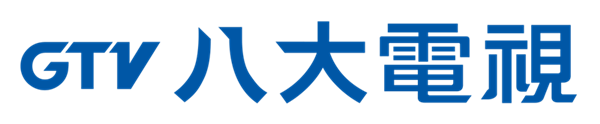
- Type: Nationwide cable TV network
- Branding: GTV
- Country: Republic of China (Taiwan)
- Availability: Taiwan
- Headquarters: Neihu District, Taipei
- Launch date: June 13, 1997
- Official website: http://www.gtv.com.tw/

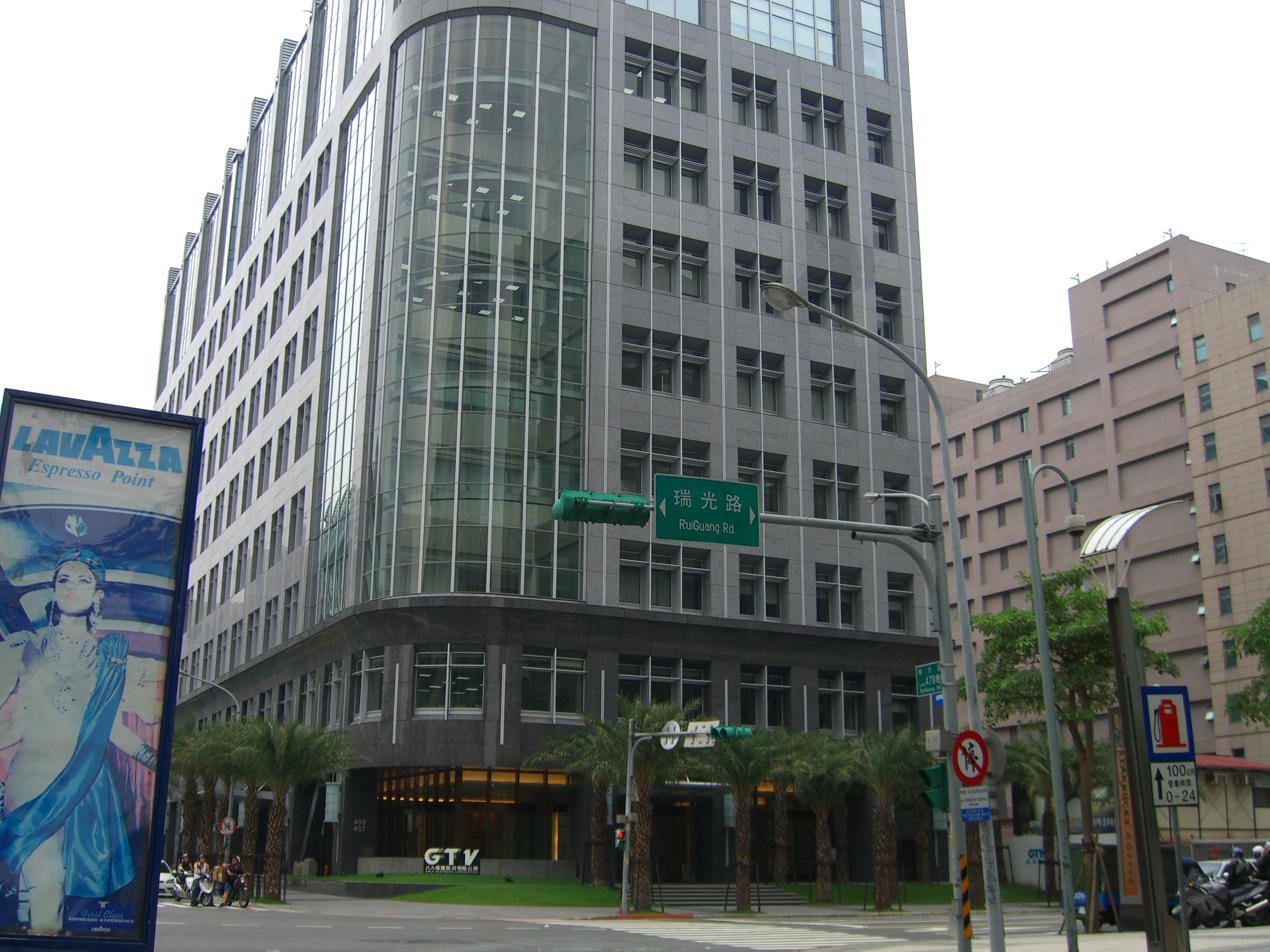
GTV building in Neihu, Taipei City

Gala Television Corporation (Chinese: 八大電視股份有限公司) is a nationwide cable TV network in Taiwan that is operated by the Gala Television Corporation, established on June 13, 1997.

== GTV channels ==
GTV currently operates four commercial cable and satellite television channels:

- GTV One / CH 27 (Chinese: 八大第一台)
- GTV Variety Show / CH 28 (Chinese: 八大綜合台)
- GTV Drama / CH 41 (Chinese: 八大戲劇台)
- GTV Entertainment (Chinese: 八大娛樂台), formerly partnered with Seoul Broadcasting System to air Korean variety shows and dramas

== See also ==
- List of television channels in East Asia
