= GTV Variety Show =

- Country: Republic of China (Taiwan)
- Broadcast area: Republic of China (Taiwan)
- Network: Gala Television Corporation
- Headquarters: Taipei, Taiwan

Programming
- Languages: Mandarin; English (SAP); Japanese (SAP)

Ownership
- Owner: Gala Television Corporation

History
- Launched: 1999

Links
- Website: Official Homepage

GTV Variety Show (Chinese: 八大綜合台) is a television channel of the Gala Television Corporation in Taiwan. It mainly broadcasts Taiwanese drama and cartoons.

== See also ==
- Media of Taiwan
