= Megan Lai =

Taiwanese actress and singer

- 賴雅妍
- Lai in 2012
- Born: 5 December 1979 (age 46); Yonghe, Taipei County (now New Taipei City)
- Education: Shih Hsin University (BA); Ming Chuan University (MA)
- Occupations: Actress; singer-songwriter; model; television host
- Years active: 2000–present

Chinese name
- Traditional Chinese: 賴雅妍
Transcriptions
Standard Mandarin
- Hanyu Pinyin: Lài Yǎyán
- Musical career
- Also known as: Lai Ya-yan
- Genre: Mandopop
- Instruments: Vocals, piano

Megan Lai (Chinese: 賴雅妍; pinyin: Lài Yǎyán; born 5 December 1979) is a Taiwanese actress and singer who is best known for Bromance, Miss Rose, Meteor Garden II and Mars.

== Life and career ==
=== Early life and education ===
Lai was born on 5 December 1979 in Yonghe, Taipei County. She is the younger of two daughters. Her father operates a Chinese medicinal herb shop, and her older sister is a teacher.

Lai is left-handed, and is able to produce handwritten mirror text, in addition to normal writing with her right hand. As a result, she often has difficulty distinguishing left from right.

Lai graduated from Taipei Municipal Datong High School, where she was the president of her school's pop dance club. Lai completed her bachelor's degree in Information Communications at Shih Hsin University. In 2008, she enrolled as a part-time learner in Ming Chuan University. She graduated in 2011 with a Master of Arts in design management.

Lai is also licensed barista, having attained her barista certificate in 2016.

=== Career ===
==== Career beginnings ====
In 1999, Lai made her first television appearance on the Taiwanese variety show Guess in the segment "Do not judge a book by its cover", where she was a contestant along with Hebe Tien of girl group S.H.E, amongst others. She was later scouted by a modelling agency, where she started her career modelling for magazine pictorials, television advertisements, music video productions and fashion shows.

In 2002, Lai was scouted by notable television producer Angie Chai after appearing in Vic Chou's music video.

In December 2004, Lai released her first studio album, Love, which featured soundtracks from the television series' Mars and Starry Night, in which Lai also starred in.

==== Transition into leading roles ====
In 2010, Lai appeared alongside Baron Chen, Lego Lee and Chie Tanaka in the drama Because of You.

Upon graduating with a Master of Arts in January 2011, Lai was cast in the police crime drama Next Heroes. Filming began in the same month, and only commenced its broadcast run in October of the same year. Concurrently in 2011, Lai played the role of Su Hai-er in the period drama The Invaluable Treasure 1949. The role earned her a Best Actress nomination at the 46th Golden Bell Awards.

In 2012, Lai was cast in the SETTV romantic comedy Miss Rose in which she played the titular character opposite Roy Chiu.

==== Rising popularity ====
In 2014, Lai was cast in the role of A Bu-si, a lesbian barista in the highly anticipated movie adaptation of Café. Waiting. Love, penned by well-known Taiwanese novelist Giddens Ko. Lai started taking barista lessons and shed her long hair in preparation for the role, even going to the extent of not attending any public event to maintain the secrecy of her participation in the movie before her casting was announced to the public.

Lai was also cast as an ultramarathon coach in Jay Chou's first movie as an executive producer, 10,000 Miles, starring opposite Sean Huang and Darren Wang. To prepare for the role of an ultramarathon coach, Lai underwent training for three months under ultramarathon runner and executive producer, Kevin Lin. The movie was released in December 2016 to poor critical reception.

In September 2015, Lai received her fourth nomination for the Golden Bell Award for Best Actress in a Miniseries or Television Film for her role in the film The End of Love. The same month, Lai commenced filming for the romantic comedy Bromance, in which she played the role Pi Ya-nuo, a girl who has to pretend to be a boy until her 26th birthday to be safeguarded a smooth-sailing life. The drama ended its broadcast run to massive domestic and international success, and Lai received tremendous support for her portrayal in the drama.

In 2016, Lai joined the cast of the musical More Than Words, which celebrated the life and works of musical artist Chang Yu-sheng.

In 2018, after a short hiatus from acting, Lai returned to the small screen in the television series Meet Me @ 1006 in a guest appearance. Lai was then cast alongside Sammi Cheng, Kenny Bee and Richie Jen in the movie Fagara, the silver screen adaptation of Amy Cheung's novel Wo De Ai Ru Ci Ma La. The role earned her a Best Actress nomination for the Hong Kong Film Critics Society Award.

Lai also starred in the blockchain corporate warfare movie The Last Thieves opposite Yen Tsao, Joanne Tseng, and Eric Tsang, which was released in fall 2019.

== Filmography ==
=== Television ===
Year	English title	Original title	Role	Notes
2002	Meteor Garden II	流星花園II	Mimi	
2003	Spicy High-School Pupils	麻辣高校生	Chen Hui-min	Guest appearance
2003	Hi Working Girl	Hi 上班女郎	Tseng Ai-lin	
2003	Love Storm	狂愛龍捲風	Tina	Guest appearance
2004	Mars	戰神	Lai Ching-mei	
2004	Starry Night	愛在星光燦爛時	Megan	
2005	Good Beautiful Clinic 2	好美麗診所II嘿哈	Chen Ruo-nan	
2006	Silence	深情密碼	Mi Hsiao-kuang	
2006	White Robe of Love	白袍之戀	Sun Qian	
2007	Sweet Relationship	美味關係	Jen Ko-hsin	
2007–2008	Wish to See You Again	這裡發現愛	One half of a couple	Episode 5
2008–2009	Time Story	光陰的故事	Wang Chien-chien	
2010	Because of You	星光下的童話	Yu You-tung	
2010	Rice Family	飯糰之家	Yen Hsin-ya	
2011	The Invaluable Treasure 1949	瑰寶1949	Su Hai-er	
2011	Next Heroes	真的漢子	Hai Qiao	
2012	Miss Rose	螺絲小姐要出嫁	Luo Sze-yi	
2013	Two Fathers	兩個爸爸	Fang Ching-chu	
2013	Jiu Jiu Nu Er Hong	九九女兒紅	Tao Jiudan	
2014	High Heels and a Scalpel	白袍下的高跟鞋	Wu Ya-fan	
2015–2016	Bromance	愛上哥們	Pi Ya-nuo / Pi Ya-chi	
2018	Meet Me @ 1006	1006的房客	Chen Yu-fang	Guest appearance
2021	Piggy's Counterattack	三隻小豬的逆襲	Chu Hsiao-tung	
2023	Love Yourself	沒有你依然燦爛	Sun Min-min	

=== Film ===
Year	English title	Original title	Role	Notes
2004	Free as Love	浮生若夢	Ah Pin	
2005	How's Life	生命狂想曲	Lai Hsin-yi	Television
2005	Ashia's Dream	愛絲希雅的夢中夢	Nurse	Guest appearance
2005	Chocolate Rap	巧克力重擊	Ally Lin	
2006	Auctioning Off A Corner of the World	拍賣世界的角落	Fran	Television
2007	Motorbike on Fire!	燃燒吧！機車	Wu Ke-wei	Short film
2008	Clinic	黑道診所	Ai Hsiao-hui	Television
2009	Taipei 24H	台北異想	Megan Lai	Segment "Share the Morning"
2009	L-O-V-E	愛到底	Yen	Segment "San sheng you xing"
2011	Will You Still Love Me	妳是否依然愛我	Peggy Tien	
2011	You Are the Apple of My Eye	那些年，我們一起追的女孩	One half of a couple	Guest appearance
2012	Jumping Boy	不倒翁的奇幻旅程	A-yun	
2014	Proposal	家事提案	Lee Hsiao-tung	Television
2014	Café. Waiting. Love	等一個人咖啡	A Bu-si	
2015	The End of Love	愛情的盡頭	Li Yi-lun	Television
2016	10,000 Miles	一萬公里的約定	Ellie	
2019	Fagara	花椒之味	Branch Au-yeung	
2019	The Last Thieves	聖人大盜	Hsu Ching	
2020	Get the Hell Out	逃出立法院	Hsiung Ying-ying	
2023	Cyber Heist	斷網	Sandy To Wing-shan	

=== Variety show ===
Year	English title	Original title	Notes
2005	Super Deal	超級好康A	Host
2007–2010	GoGo Japan	—N/a	Host

=== Music video appearances ===
Year	Artist	Song title
2000	Shino Lin	"This is"
2001	Chiang Yu-heng	"Deny"
2001	Stefanie Sun	"Kite"
2001	Sammi Cheng	"Future"
2001	Tiger Huang	"Firework Live"
2001	Shunza	"There's No Ugly Woman"
2002	Vic Chou	"Hotline for Help"
2002	Eason Chan	"Men's Fault"
2002	Yang Kun and Chen Lin	"World of Us"
2004	Faith Yang	"Queen"
2010	Huang Pin-yuan	"Pisces Love"
2010	A-Lin	"Give Me A Reason To Forget"
2011	Cindy Yen	"Let Go"
2012	Princess Ai	"Love Forever"
2017	Wu Bai & China Blue	"Ai Ni Wu Mu Di"
2017	Bii	"Think Of You"
2020	JJ Lin	"Drifters"

== Discography ==
=== Studio albums ===
Title	Album details	Track listing
Love	Released: 28 December 2004; Label: Black Mustard; Formats: CD, digital download	Track listing: 1. 影子情人; 2. 愛死了; 3. 感覺你; 4. 掙脫; 5. The Hardest Note; 6. 試著忘了; 7. 有病; 8. 愛的決定權; 9. 熱吻; 10. 愛可以燦爛很久
Face	Released: 27 March 2015; Label: More Entertainment; Formats: CD, digital download	Track listing: 1. 臉 2. I'm Ok; 3. Stray Dog; 4. 是我; 5. 孤單的決定; 6. Flow; 7. 剛才; 8. 獨來獨往; 9. 女孩; 10. 未完待續

=== Soundtrack appearances ===
Year	Song title	Album	Notes
2004	"The Hardest Note"	Mars OST	
2004	"感覺你"	Starry Night OST	
2004	"愛可以燦爛很久"	Starry Night OST	
2006	"轉身的時候"	Silence OST	
2007	"愛的勇氣"	Corner with Love OST	
2007	"有你有我"	Sweet Relationship OST	
2007	"直覺"	Sweet Relationship OST	
2010	"小雨心事"	Because of You OST	
2010	"團團愛"	Rice Family OST	
2010	"冬末之戀"	Rice Family OST	
2011	"行行好"	Rainbow Sweetheart OST	
2011	"如果不是你"	Rainbow Sweetheart OST	
2012	"快樂不倒翁"	Jumping Boy OST	
2012	Track listing: 1. "遇見對的人"; 2. "我愛誰"; 3. "肥皂劇之偶像連成戲"; 4. "多災多難的愛情"; 5. "我也想當女主角"; 6. "上床？床上！"; 7. "心動"; 8. "醋"; 9. "忘掉"; 10. "愛．旋轉"	Crazy Idol Soap OST	Musical
2013	"如果沒有你"	Two Fathers OST	
2014	"未完待續"	High Heels and a Scalpel OST	
2015	"Flow"	Future Mr. Right OST	
2016	Track listing: 1. "天天想你"; 2. "水藍色眼淚"; 3. "我是一顆秋天的樹"; 4. "當我開始偷偷地想你"	More Than Words OST	Musical
2017	"依然是你"	Art in Love OST	
2018	"舞魅娘"	Wuda's Girls OST	

=== Songwriting credits ===
Year	Album	Artist	Song title	Lyrics		Music		Notes
Year	Album	Artist	Song title	Credited	With	Credited	With	
2004	Love	Megan Lai	"The Hardest Note"	Yes	林尚德	No	N/A	from Mars OST
2004	Love	Megan Lai	"感覺你"	Yes	N/A	No	N/A	from Starry Night OST
2011	2 be different	Cindy Yen	"釋懷"	Yes	Alang Huang 黃俊郎	No	N/A	
2012	Crazy Idol Soap OST	Megan Lai	"忘掉"	Yes	N/A	No	N/A	
2014	Bring Me Home Charity Event Theme Song	Mickey Huang Fang Wen-lin Landy Wen Xiu Jie Kai Lin Yu-pin Jay Shih Steven Sun Lyla Lin	"帶我回家"	Yes	Ian Chen (F.I.R.)	No	N/A	
2014	Face	Megan Lai	"未完待續"	Yes	N/A	No	N/A	from High Heels and a Scalpel OST
2015	Face	Megan Lai	"臉"	Yes	N/A	No	N/A	
2015	Face	Megan Lai	"Stray Dog"	Yes	Real Huang (F.I.R.)	No	N/A	
2015	Face	Megan Lai	"Flow"	Yes	N/A	Yes	N/A	from Future Mr. Right OST
2015	Face	Megan Lai	"剛才"	Yes	Deepwhite 深白色	No	N/A	
2015	Face	Megan Lai	"女孩"	Yes	N/A	Yes	N/A	
2018	Art in Love OST	Megan Lai	"依然是你"	Yes	Chris Yen 顏維霆	No	N/A	

== Theater ==
Year	English title	Original title	Role
2009	Fools	傻瓜村	Su Wan-tung
2010	Seventeen Year Itch	17年之癢	Misa
2011	By the End of the Flora Season	花季未了	Chiang Yen-ping
2012	Crazy Idol Soap	瘋狂偶像劇	An-chi
2012	The Goodbye Girl	再見女郎	Bao-chi
2012–2013	The Goodbye Girl	再見女郎	Bao-chi
2014	Crazy Idol Soap	瘋狂偶像劇	An-chi
2015	Crazy Television 3	瘋狂電視台3-來自地球的你	An-chi
2016	More Than Words	天天想你	Hsu Man
2017	Crazy Idol Soap	瘋狂偶像劇	An-chi
2019	Crazy Idol Soap	瘋狂偶像劇	An-chi

== Published works ==
- Lai, Megan (2005). 台灣大長今美容寶典：賴雅妍漢方美容. Taipei. ISBN 9578035136.
- Lai, Megan (2015). Face. More Entertainment. (e-book)
- 柯, 映安 (2019). 死了一個娛樂女記者之後 (Audiobook). 鏡文學股份有限公司. ISBN 9789869695060.

== Awards and nominations ==
Year	Award	Category	Nominated work	Result
2005	40th Golden Bell Awards	Best Actress in a Miniseries or Television Film	How's Life	Nominated
2005	42nd Golden Horse Awards	Best New Performer	How's Life	Nominated
2006	51st Asia-Pacific Film Festival	Best Actress	How's Life	Nominated
2006	51st Asia-Pacific Film Festival	Best Actress	Chocolate Rap	Nominated
2011	46th Golden Bell Awards	Best Actress	Invaluable Treasure 1949	Nominated
2013	Sanlih Drama Awards	Best Actress	Two Fathers	Nominated
2013	Sanlih Drama Awards	Best Kiss (with Weber Yang)	Two Fathers	Nominated
2014	49th Golden Bell Awards	Best Actress in a Miniseries or Television Film	Proposal	Nominated
2015	50th Golden Bell Awards	Best Actress in a Miniseries or Television Film	The End of Love	Nominated
2015	Sanlih Drama Awards	Best Actress	Bromance	Won
2020	26th Hong Kong Film Critics Society Award	Best Actress	Fagara	Nominated
2020	39th Hong Kong Film Awards	Best Supporting Actress	Fagara	Nominated
