= The Masked Lover (TV series) =

2017 Taiwanese television series

- Promotional poster
- 我的愛情不平凡
- Genre: Romance; Comedy
- Created by: Sanlih E-Television
- Written by: Zhang Fang Ying 張芳瑛 (Screenwriter coordinator); Shao Hui Ting 邵慧婷 (Ep. 1-2); Ma Qian Dai 馬千代 (Ep. 4-19)
- Directed by: Zhang Jin Rong 張晉榮
- Starring: Weber Yang; Mini Tsai; Kurt Chou; Genie Chen
- Opening theme: My Extraordinary Love 我的愛情不平凡 by Lin Yu-pin
- Ending theme: I’m Burning by Ian Chen
- Country of origin: Taiwan
- Original language: Mandarin
- No. of episodes: 19

Production
- Producer: Cheng Chih-wei
- Production location: Taiwan
- Running time: 90 minutes
- Production companies: Sanlih E-Television; Dasiang Communication Co., Ltd. Hong Dou Communication Co., Ltd.

Original release
- Network: TTV; SET Metro
- Release: 26 March – 30 July 2017

Related
- Behind Your Smile; Memory Love

The Masked Lover (Chinese: 我的愛情不平凡; pinyin: wǒ de àiqíng bù píngfán; literally "My Extraordinary Love") is a 2017 Taiwanese romantic-comedy television series created and produced by Sanlih E-Television. Starring Weber Yang, Mini Tsai, Kurt Chou and Genie Chen as the main cast. Filming began on February 20, 2017, and wrapped up on July 17, 2017. First original broadcast on TTV every Sunday at 10:00 pm started March 26, 2017, with the last of the 19 episodes airing on July 30, 2017.

== Cast ==
=== Main cast ===
- Weber Yang as Gu Le Jun
- Mini Tsai as Wu Ping Fan / Wu Ping An
  - Rose Qiu as young Ping Fan
  - Melody Qiu as young Ping An
- Kurt Chou as Zhao Tian Xing
- Genie Chen as Gu Jing Xuan

=== Supporting cast ===
- Lin Yu-pin as He Mi Qi
- Deyn Lee as Li Da Qiang (Xiao Zhi)
- Chiung-Tzu Chang as Ye Feng Jiao
- Chang Fu-chien as captain
- Fu Lei as Gu Zheng Yi
- Hui Hsiao as Wang Yu Ling
- Elten Ting as Wang Hui Lan
- Paul Hsu as Ceng Guo Hao
- Calvin Lee as Zhuang Jing Fan
- Knox Chen as Ah Liang
- Yue-Feng Wang as Xiao Min Qian (Hei Biao)
- Zhuang Xin Yu as Wu Xiao Jing
- Lung Shao-hua as Rong Fu Xiong
- Ed Chan as Da Fei

=== Special appearances ===
- Frankie Huang as Ah Gou
- Wang Dao-Nan as He Jian Min
- Wu Kang-jen as Huo Ting En
- Enson Chang as Jiang Sheng Xi
- Huang Xin Di as Li Wan Yu

== Soundtrack ==
- My Extraordinary Love 我的愛情不平凡 by Lin Yu-pin 阿喜
- I'm Burning by Ian Chen 陳彥允
- Dream Lover 夢中情人 by Ian Chen 陳彥允
- Lonely Planet 寂寞星球 by Ian Chen 陳彥允
- Adventure Novel 冒險小說 by Ian Chen 陳彥允
- Being Happy to the Point of Impossibility 快樂到不可能的事 by Lin Yu-pin 阿喜
- Love & Hug 你的擁抱 by JR 紀言愷 & Lin Yu-pin 阿喜
- Sparkling Fireworks I Love You 煙火燦爛我愛你 by JR 紀言愷

== Broadcast ==
Network	Country	Airing Date	Timeslot
TTV	Taiwan	March 26, 2017	Sunday 10:00-11:30 pm
SET Metro	Taiwan	April 1, 2017	Saturday 10:00-11:30 pm
TVB Chinese Drama	Hong Kong	May 20, 2017	Saturday 1:00-2:30 pm
Astro Shuang Xing	Malaysia	August 21, 2017	Monday to Friday 4:00-5:00 pm
Hub E City	Singapore	September 24, 2017	Sunday 9:30-11:00 pm
TVB Chinese Drama	Hong Kong	June 20, 2020	Saturday 6:00-8:30 am
UNTV	Philippines	This 2020	TBA

== Episode ratings ==
Competing dramas on rival channels airing at the same time slot were:

- FTV - She's Family, Far and Away, The Best of Youth
- EBC Variety - The King of Romance, Love, Timeless
- PTS - The Teenage Psychic
- CTS - Doctors
- CTV - Attention, Love!

Air Date	Episode	Average Ratings	Rank
Mar 26, 2017	1	1.02	2
Apr 2, 2017	2	1.11	2
Apr 9, 2017	3	1.22	2
Apr 16, 2017	4	1.34	1
Apr 23, 2017	5	1.38	1
Apr 30, 2017	6	1.12	2
May 7, 2017	7	1.24	2
May 14, 2017	8	1.05	2
May 21, 2017	9	1.02	2
May 28, 2017	10	1.25	1
Jun 4, 2017	11	1.06	2
Jun 11, 2017	12	1.12	1
Jun 18, 2017	13	1.26	1
Jun 25, 2017	14	1.01	1
Jul 2, 2017	15	1.01	1
Jul 9, 2017	16	1.09	1
Jul 16, 2017	17	1.18	1
Jul 23, 2017	18	1.28	1
Jul 30, 2017	19	1.46	1
Average ratings		1.17	--

== Crossover episodes ==
On April 16, 2017, The Masked Lover had a crossover with The Perfect Match.
