= List of awards and nominations received by Bii (singer) =

This is a list of awards and nominations received by Bii.

== 2012 ==
Ceremony	Award	Nominated	Result	Ref.
MY Astro Music Awards	勢在必行	Best Song	Won	
MY Astro Music Awards	勢在必行	Best Single	Won	
Malaysia PWH Music Award	勢在必行	Best Original Song	Won	
Malaysia PWH Music Award	勢在必行	Redbox Popular Song	Gold Award	

== 2013 ==
Ceremony	Award	Nominated	Result	Ref.
eTV Top 10 Star Selection	6th place	Himself	Won	

== 2014 ==
Ceremony	Award	Nominated	Result	Ref.
MTV Trendsetting Chart Awards	Trendsetting New Idol	Himself	Won	
MTV Trendsetting Chart Awards	Best Looking Artist	Himself	Won	
Global Chinese Golden Chart	HitFM Push	Himself	Won	
Global Chinese Golden Chart	Top 20 Songs	Come Back To Me	Won	
V Chart Awards	Hong Kong and Taiwan Region Leading Artist of the Year	Himself	Won	
Hito Music Awards	Rising Male Artist of the Year	Himself	Won	
Hito Music Awards	Collaboration of the Year	我會在你身邊	Won	
Hito Music Awards	Top 10 Mandarin Songs	Come Back To Me	Won	
City Super Chart	Top 20 Songs	Come Back To Me	Won	
City Super Chart	Favorite Singer by University Students	Himself	Won	
CGC Fashion Festival	Most Popular Artist	Himself	Won	
Singapore Golden Melody Awards	Stage Performance Award	Himself	Won	

== 2015 ==
Ceremony	Award	Nominated	Result	Ref.
V-Chart Music Awards	Best Singer-songwriter	Himself	Won	
Ku Music Awards	Hong Kong and Taiwan Region Popular Singer Among Campus of the Year	Himself	Won	
Red Star Music Festival Awards	Male Artist of the Year	Himself	Won	
Music Radio China TOP Chart Awards	Hong Kong and Taiwan Region Popular Singer Among Campus of the Year	Himself	Won	

== 2016 ==
Ceremony	Award	Nominated	Result	Ref.
KKBOX Music Awards	Top 10 Singers	Himself	Won	
QQ Music Awards	Top 10 Songs	Love More	Won	
Hito Music Awards	Rising Male Act	Himself	Won	
Global Chinese Music Awards	Popular Singer-songwriter	Himself	Won	
Global Chinese Music Awards	Top 5 Popular Male Singer	Himself	Won	
Global Chinese Music Awards	Top 20 Songs	Love More	Won	

== 2017 ==
Ceremony	Award	Nominated	Result	Ref.
Music Radio Chinese TOP Chart Awards	Top 20 Songs		Won	
Music Radio Chinese TOP Chart Awards	Best Push Act	Himself	Won	
Hito Music Awards	Most Appealing Artist	Himself	Won	
Hito Music Awards	Popular MV	Catch Your Double Eye	Won	
MTV European Music Awards	Best Greater China Act	Himself	Nominated	
