= Ian Chen =

Ian Chen may refer to:

- Ian Chen (actor) (born 2006), American actor
- Ian Chen (musician) (born 1991), Taiwan singer and actor
- Ian Chen (born 1971), member of Taiwanese band F.I.R.
