= The Last Thieves =

2019 Taiwanese drama film

- Film poster
- Directed by: Jack Hsu
- Screenplay by: Jack Hsu; Yang Wan-ju
- Produced by: Eric Tsang; Yeh Ju-feng
- Starring: Megan Lai; Yen Tsao; Joanne Tseng; Eric Tsang; Hou Yan-xi; Wu Chien-ho; Kao Ying-hsuan; Johnny Lu
- Cinematography: Garvin Chan
- Edited by: Shieh Meng-ju
- Music by: Venk Yang
- Production company: Selfpick Production
- Distributed by: A Really Happy Film Co., Ltd.
- Release date: October 18, 2019 (Taiwan)
- Running time: 107 minutes
- Country: Taiwan
- Language: Mandarin

The Last Thieves (Chinese: 聖人大盜; pinyin: shèng rén dà dào, literally "Sages and Thieves") is a 2019 Taiwanese drama film written and directed by Jack Hsu. The film stars Yen Tsao and Joanne Tseng as young entrepreneurs who are pitted against the elites of the social hierarchy, played by Megan Lai and Eric Tsang.

The film is billed as Asia's first Blockchain corporate warfare movie and introduces the concept of Blockchain decentralization and immersive entertainment.

== Cast ==
- Megan Lai as Hsu Ching
- Yen Tsao as Yin Tzu-hsiang
- Joanne Tseng as Chen Hsi
- Eric Tsang as Lin Ming-yen
- Hou Yan-xi as Nick
- Wu Chien-ho as Tai Yi
- Kao Ying-hsuan as Chen Fa-tong
- Johnny Lu as Kao Yu-hsiu
- Heaven Hai as Show host

== Awards and nominations ==
Year	Award	Category	Nominee	Result
2019	56th Golden Horse Awards	Best New Director	Jack Hsu	Nominated
