= Someone like You (TV series) =

- Promo poster
- 聽見幸福
- Genre: Romance; Melodrama; Comedy
- Created by: Sanlih E-Television
- Written by: Chen Jie-ying; Zhu Yīng; Luo Qian-ni; Lin Pei-yu; Zheng Ying-min; Zheng Han-wen
- Directed by: Chen Rong-hui
- Starring: Kingone Wang; Lorene Ren; Sean Lee; Nita Lei; William Liao
- Opening theme: "I'm Still Missing You 我还想念你" by Bii
- Ending theme: "Empty 空" by Tracy Wang
- Country of origin: Taiwan
- Original language: Mandarin
- No. of seasons: 1
- No. of episodes: 20

Production
- Producers: Fang Xiao-ren; Rong Jun-yi
- Production location: Taiwan
- Camera setup: Multi camera
- Running time: 75 minutes
- Production companies: Sanlih E-Television; Golden Bloom Production Co., Ltd.

Original release
- Network: TTV
- Release: 11 January – 24 May 2015

Related
- Say Again Yes I Do; When I See You Again

Someone Like You (Chinese: 聽見幸福; pinyin: Tīng Jiàn Xìng Fú) is a 2015 Taiwanese romantic-comedy melodrama television series produced by Sanlih E-Television, starring Kingone Wang and Lorene Ren with Sean Lee, Nita Lei and William Liao of Lollipop F. The original title literally translates to "Hearing Happiness". Filming began on December 21, 2014, and finished on May 19, 2015. The drama was filmed as it aired. First original broadcast began January 11, 2015 on TTV channel airing on Sunday nights from 10:00-11:30 pm. Final episode aired on May 24, 2015, with 20 episodes total.

== Synopsis ==
A man loses everything in one day in a tragic car accident. Fang Zhan Cheng (Kingone Wang) lost his fiancée, Liang Luo Han (Lorene Ren), as well as his eyesight. Devastated by the loss of his fiancée, Zhan Cheng is inconsolable and even refuses a corneal transplant that could restore his vision. But his life takes an unexpected turn when Chen Yu Xi (Lorene Ren), who looks exactly like his fiancée, is hired to become Zhan Cheng's day nurse. Another young woman, Xu Ya Ti (Nita Lei), receives Luo Han's heart in a transplant and begins to exhibit many of Luo Han's mannerisms and personality. Caught between a woman who looks exactly like his beloved dead fiancée and another woman who behaves just like her, what will Zhan Cheng do?.

== Cast ==
=== Main cast ===
- Kingone Wang as Fang Zhan-cheng
- Lorene Ren as Liang Luo-han / Chen Yu-xi
- Sean Lee as Li Bo-yan
- Nita Lei as Xu Ya-ti
- William Liao as Shen Wei-lian

=== Supporting cast ===
- Miao Ke-li as Wang Yu-zhen
- Angela Li as Wang Xiao-lin
- Xu Hao-xuan as Chen Yu-an
- Katie Chen as Xie Fei-fei
- Yin Fu as Vanessa
- Hu Pei-lian as Yang Yi Min
- Alex Dong 董至成 as Xie Qian-jing
- Lin Xiu-jun as Gao Dong
- Shen Hairong as Juan Jie

=== Extended cast ===
- Bii as Gu Long
- Fu Lei as Gu Dong chairman
- Jane Tu as Cindy
- KaiLi as Reporter
- Ying Wei-min as Triad boss
- THE CLIPPERS BAND as Triad gangsters
- Chen Jun-an as Reporter Chen
- Liu Erjin as Xu Fu
- Selina Jen as TV host (episode 15)

== Soundtrack ==
Someone Like You Original TV Soundtrack (OST)

Soundtrack album by Various artists
- Released: 23 January 2015
- Genre: Mandopop
- Language: Mandarin
- Labels: Seed Music Co., Ltd.

Someone Like You Original TV Soundtrack (OST) (聽見幸福 電視原聲帶) was released on January 23, 2015, by various artists under Seed Music Co., Ltd. It contains 21 tracks total, in which 16 songs are various versions of the original songs. The opening theme "I'm Still Missing You 我还想念你" by Bii 畢書盡 is not featured on the official soundtrack CD since singer Bii is signed exclusively to Linfair Records. The closing theme is track 1 "Empty 空" by Tracy Wang 汪小敏.

=== Track listing ===
No.	Title	Singer(s)	Length
1.	"Empty" (空)	Tracy Wang 汪小敏	4:22
2.	"Loving or Not, I'm Still Lonely" (爱不爱都寂寞)	Lorene Ren 任容萱	3:37
3.	"Have Not Found You" (没有找到你)	Koala Liu 劉思涵	4:56
4.	"Ancient Resistant" (古耐)	Huang Yali 黄雅莉	3:17
5.	"Loving or Not, I'm Still Lonely (Warm ver.)" (爱不爱都寂寞 (溫馨版))	Instrumental	2:24
6.	"Empty (Romance ver.)" (空 (浪漫愛情版))	Instrumental	2:05
7.	"Have Not Found You (Romantic ver.)" (没有找到你 (浪漫愛情版))	Instrumental	2:48
8.	"Ancient Resistant (Romantic ver.)" (古耐 (浪漫愛情版))	Instrumental	2:41
9.	"Ancient Resistant (Pleasant ver.)" (古耐 (舒心演奏版))	Instrumental	2:40
10.	"Have Not Found You (Excite ver.)" (没有找到你 (搖滾振奮版))	Instrumental	2:32
11.	"Empty (Power ver.)" (空 (力量版))	Instrumental	2:07
12.	"Empty (Ballad ver.)" (空 (清新民謠版))	Instrumental	2:55
13.	"Have Not Found You (Ballad ver.)" (没有找到你 (清新民謠版))	Instrumental	2:03
14.	"Empty (Lovely Fantasy ver.)" (空 (可愛奇幻版))	Instrumental	2:07
15.	"Have Not Found You (Magic Variation ver.)" (没有找到你 (魔法變奏版))	Instrumental	2:04
16.	"Ancient Resistant (Obsess ver.)" (古耐 (迷幻律動版))	Instrumental	2:02
17.	"Empty (Magnificent ver.)" (空 (氣勢磅礡版))	Instrumental	2:07
18.	"Ancient Resistant (Heart Strength ver.)" (古耐 (心如刀割版))	Instrumental	2:17
19.	"Loving or Not, I'm Still Lonely (Gently ver.)" (愛不愛都寂寞 (悠柔清新版))	Instrumental	2:43
20.	"Loving or Not, I'm Still Lonely (Acappella ver.)" (愛不愛都寂寞 (清唱版))	Lorene Ren 任容萱	2:42
21.	"Happy To Hear" (聽見幸福)	Lorene Ren 任容萱 & Alan Ko 柯有綸	4:04

Songs not featured on the official soundtrack album.

- I'm Still Missing You 我还想念你 by Bii 畢書盡
- Baby Don't 你在ㄍㄧㄥ什麼? by Bii 畢書盡
- My Love For You Will Not Change 我愛你不會改變 by Bii 畢書盡
- We Are Walking in Love 我們在愛中漫步 by Bii 畢書盡
- Break Me Down by Bii 畢書盡

== Publications ==
Someone Like You Original Novel (聽見幸福 原創小說)
- Book cover image
- Author: Sanlih E-Television 三立電視監製; Fang Xiao-ren 方孝仁; Chen Bi-zhen 陳碧真
- Genre: Fiction novel
- Published: 15 April 2015
- Publication place: Taiwan
- Media type: Print paperback
- Pages: 248
- ISBN: 9789863664765

* 15 April 2015 : Someone Like You Original Novel (聽見幸福 原創小說) - ISBN 9789863664765 - Author: Sanlih E-Television 三立電視監製, Fang Xiao-ren 方孝仁, Chen Bi-zhen 陳碧真 - Publisher: Taiwan Kadokawa 台灣角川

A novel based on the drama was published detailing the entire story line of the drama. Spoilers were revealed in the novel before the drama finished airing.

* 2 April 2015 : S-Pop Vol. 26 April 2015 (華流 4月號/2015第26期) - Author: Sanlih E-Television 三立電視監製

For the April 2015 issue of S-Pop magazine, lead actors Kingone Wang and Lorene Ren appear on the cover of the regular edition of the April 2015 issue.

* 3 May 2015 : S-Pop Vol. 27 May 2015 (華流 5月號/2015第27期) - Author: Sanlih E-Television 三立電視監製

A special issue of May 2015 S-Pop volume 27 was devoted to the drama Someone Like You. Two editions of the same cover featuring Kingone Wang and Lorene Ren was published. The regular edition with the magazine itself only and a special edition with one of two random mini die cut cardboard cutout of the lead actors included.

== Development and casting ==
- The main male and female lead, Kingone Wang and Lorene Ren were introduced to the press at a press conference held at SETTV headquarters rooftop garden lobby in Neihu District, Taipei on December 19, 2014.
- The premier press conference was held on January 9, 2015, at TTV headquarters in Songshan District, Taipei. The extended cast was unveiled and an extended 16 minute trailer was previewed. Fans were also invited via first-come, first-served seating to meet the cast.
- On January 16, 2015, another entire main cast press conference was held at SETTV headquarters auditorium in Neihu District, Taipei for the drama premier on SETTV channel. Fans were also invited to the event via first-come, first-served seating to meet the cast.
- A farewell fan meet and greet event was held on May 23, 2015, to thank fans for making the drama a success. The event was held at SETTV headquarters main auditorium in Neihu District, Taipei.
- The wrap up celebration party was held on May 27, 2015.

== Episode ratings ==
Competing dramas on rival channels airing at the same time slot were:
- CTS - We Get Married
- CTV - Heart of Steel, The Crossing Hero
- FTV - The 1st Shop of Coffee Prince, Aries, Leo

Air Date	Episode	Episode Title	Average Ratings	Rank
January 11, 2015	1	Meeting You Was The Luckiest Thing That Ever Happened In My Life 可以遇見你，真是我人生最大的好運	1.35	1
January 18, 2015	2	I Still Miss You 我還想念妳	1.37	1
January 25, 2015	3	We Are Taking Slow Walks In Our Love 我們在愛中漫步	1.63	1
February 1, 2015	4	Truth Behind A Shooting Star 流星的誓言	1.75	1
February 8, 2015	5	The Main Point Of Happiness 幸福集點	1.59	1
February 15, 2015	6	Snow's Promise 雪的約定	1.86	1
February 22, 2015	7	Must Have Cinderella 飛天谷的仙杜瑞拉	1.88	1
March 1, 2015	8	Edelweiss 雪絨花	1.83	1
March 8, 2015	9	Deja Vu 似曾相識	1.88	1
March 15, 2015	10	Thank You 謝謝你	1.88	1
March 22, 2015	11	Touched 心動	2.13	1
March 29, 2015	12	Next Stop, Happiness 下一站幸福	2.03	1
April 5, 2015	13	Love Straight Forward 愛情直球	2.28	1
April 12, 2015	14	Happiness-ing 幸福ing	2.07	1
April 19, 2015	15	Younger Sister 姊妹	1.97	1
April 26, 2015	16	Protecting Love 愛情御守	1.78	1
May 3, 2015	17	My Love For You Will Not Change 我愛你不會改變	1.81	1
May 10, 2015	18	Bravely Chasing Love 勇敢追求幸福	1.93	1
May 17, 2015	19	Lonely Whether You're In Love or Not 愛不愛都寂寞	2.22	1
May 24, 2015	20	Hearing Happiness 聽見幸福	2.44	1
Average ratings			1.88	

== International Broadcast ==
Network(s)/Station(s)	Series premiere	Airing dates	Title
Taiwan	TTVHD32	January 11, 2015 - May 24, 2015 (Every Sunday 22:00-23:30)	聽見幸福 (Someone Like You (TV series); lit: )
Taiwan	SET Metro (Cable 30)	January 17, 2015 - May 30, 2015 (Every Saturday 22:00-23:30)	聽見幸福 (Someone Like You (TV series); lit: )
Taiwan	CHT MOD	June 26, 2015 - (Monday to Friday 21:00-22:55)	聽見幸福 (Someone Like You (TV series); lit: )
Taiwan	SET International (Dish Network 9952)	June 8, 2019 - October 26, 2019 (Every Saturday 22:00-00:00)	聽見幸福 (Someone Like You (TV series); lit: )
Europe; Americas; India	Viki:Google Play ()	January 11, 2015 - (Available every Sunday at 24:00)	''Someone Like You (TV series) ( ; lit: )
Malaysia	Astro Shuang Xing HD307	June 21, 2015- (Every Sunday to Thursday 16:00-17:00)	聽見幸福 (Someone Like You (TV series); lit: )
Singapore	Hub E City HD (StarHub TV 825)	July 3, 2015 - November 13, 2015 (Every Friday 22:00-23:30)	聽見幸福 (Someone Like You (TV series); lit: )
Japan	Home Drama	July 14, 2015 - (Every Tuesday 01:15-02:15)	(Someone Like You (TV series); lit: )
Philippines	GMA Network	November 2, 2015 to February 5, 2016 ()	(Someone Like You (TV series); lit: )
Hong Kong	Chinese Drama	March 6, 2016 - (Every Sunday 13:00-14:30)	聽見幸福 (Someone Like You (TV series); lit: )
Thailand	NOW26	June 1, 2016-July 5, 2016 (Every Monday to Friday 08:30-09:30 / 01:00-02:00)	รักครั้งใหม่ หัวใจอลเวง (Someone Like You (TV series); lit: )
Taiwan	SET Metro (Cable 30)	January 6, 2017-February 24, 2017 (Every Friday 22:00-24:00)	聽見幸福 (Someone Like You (TV series); lit: )
Taiwan	SET Metro (Cable 30)	March 4, 2017-May 6, 2017 (Every Saturday to Sunday 19:00-20:00)	聽見幸福 (Someone Like You (TV series); lit: )
Taiwan	SET TV (Cable 301)	September 13, 2015-January 3, 2016 (Every Sunday 22:00-24:00)	聽見幸福 (Someone Like You (TV series); lit: )
Taiwan	SET TV (Cable 350)	April 29, 2017-August 19, 2017 (Every Saturday 22:00-24:00)	聽見幸福 (Someone Like You (TV series); lit: )
Malaysia; Singapore; Brunei	dimsum	June 2020 - (Complete works available)	''Someone Like You (TV series) (聽見幸福; lit: )

== Awards and nominations ==
Ceremony	Category	Nominee	Result
50th Golden Bell Awards	Best Supporting Actress	Miao Ke-Li	Nominated
2015 Sanlih Drama Awards	Best Actor Award	Kingone Wang	Nominated
2015 Sanlih Drama Awards	Best Actress Award	Lorene Ren	Nominated
2015 Sanlih Drama Awards	Best Screen Couple Award	Kingone Wang & Lorene Ren	Nominated
2015 Sanlih Drama Awards	Best Kiss Award	Kingone Wang & Lorene Ren	Nominated
2015 Sanlih Drama Awards	Best Cry Award	Miao Ke-Li	Nominated
2015 Sanlih Drama Awards	Best Cry Award	Yin Fu	Nominated
2015 Sanlih Drama Awards	Best Green Leaf Award	William Liao	Nominated
2015 Sanlih Drama Awards	Best Powerful Performance Award	Miao Ke-Li	Nominated
2015 Sanlih Drama Awards	Viewers Choice Drama Award	Someone Like You	Nominated
