= Two Fathers (TV series) =

- Promotional poster
- Also known as: 兩個爸爸
- Genre: Taiwanese drama
- Written by: Shaohui Ting; Shiheng Huang; Zheng Yingmin; Chen Qiuru; Han Zheng Wen; Xu Lanxi; Chen Yixuan
- Directed by: Liu Junjie
- Starring: Weber Yang; Lin Yo-wei; Megan Lai; Amanda Chou; Liang Jing
- Opening theme: Happy Voice (幸福的聲音) by Lin Yo-wei
- Ending theme: Happiness Is Not a Love Song (幸福不是情歌) by Rene Liu
- Country of origin: Taiwan
- Original languages: Mandarin; Taiwanese
- No. of episodes: 73

Production
- Running time: 60 minutes (including commercials)
- Production company: sensual factory Communication Co.

Original release
- Network: SET Metro, Eastern Television
- Release: March 26 – July 22, 2013

Related
- Lady Maid Maid; Second Life

Two Fathers (traditional Chinese: 兩個爸爸; simplified Chinese: 两个爸爸; pinyin: Liǎng gè bà ba) is a 2013 Taiwanese television series created and developed by SETTV and Sensual Workshop Ltd. It stars Weber Yang, Lin You-wei, Megan Lai, Marcus Zhang, Amanda Chou and Le Le as the main cast for the drama series. The 73-episode drama debuted on 26 March 2013, replacing Lady Maid Maid's time slot on SETTV's 8 p.m. drama lineup.

== Cast ==
=== Main cast ===
Actor	Role	Details
Weber Yang	Tang, Xiang-xi (唐翔希)	Wen-di's lawyer father and 1st grade PTA rep, called 'Daddy'
Lin You-wei	Wen, Zhen-hua (溫振華)	Wen-di's florist father and Community Chairman, called 'Papa'
Megan Lai	Fang Jing-zhu (方靜竹)	Wen-di's teacher. Family owns car service/repair shop
Marcus Zhang	Fang, Fei-zhu (方飛竹)	The teacher's brother and mechanic at the family car shop
Amanda Chou	Jiang, Ying-fan (江映帆)	Attorney who works with Wen-di's lawyer father Xiang-xi
Le Le	Tang, Wen-di (唐溫蒂)	Young girl with 2 fathers: Xiang-xi and Zhen-hua
Jing Liang	Wu, Yong-jie (吳詠潔)	Artist living with Blackie the cat

=== Supporting cast ===
- Chang Kuo-chu (張國柱) as Tang, Yao-qun 唐耀群 - the lawyer's father
- Liao Chun (廖峻) as Fāng, Da-tong 方大銅 - the teacher's father
- Steven Sun (孫其君) as Fāng, Qing-zhu 方慶竹 - the teacher's brother studying in America
- Cheng Hsiu-ying (程秀瑛) as Chen, Guo-xiang 陳國香 - the teacher's mother
- Ada Pan (潘慧如) as Su, Wen-wen 蘇文汶 - Wendi's mom
- Que Xiao-you (闕小佑) as Ceng, Zheng-xiong 曾正雄 - Wen-di's classmate and boy friend
- Chang Ting-yi (張庭宜) as Xu, Yu-wei 徐育薇 - Wen-di's classmate and girl friend
- Liao Chin-de (廖錦德) as Ni-ou 尼歐 - mechanic, NBA (American basketball) fan
- Lara Chen (陳子玄) as Lín, Yu-fang 林育芳 - assistant at flower shop
- Lai Pei-ying (賴佩瑩) as Ceng-wu, Mei-nu 曾吳美女 - Zheng-xiong's mom
- Jane Liao (廖慧珍) as Jia, Mei-nu 賈美女 - flower shop customer in love with Zhen-hua
- Vanila Song (宋妍甄) as Xiao-pei 小佩 - female law firm employee
- Cai Shun-chieh (蔡順傑) as Cai, A-can 蔡阿燦 - male law firm employee
- Ting-Yu Kao as Zhao Ting Yu - gym teacher

=== Opening theme ===
- You-wei Lin – "Happy Voice" (幸福的聲音)

=== Ending theme ===
- Rene Liu – "Happiness Is Not a Love Song" (幸福不是情歌)

=== Insert songs ===
- Megan Lai – "If There Was Not You" (如果沒有你)
- Magic Power MP魔幻力量 – "Forgotten How to Love You" (忘了怎麼愛你)
- Magic Power MP魔幻力量 – "Photosynthesis" (光合作用)
- Yen-j Mayday – "Cleanliness" (潔癖)

== Broadcast ==
Country/Region	Channel	Timeslot	Episode premiere	Episode finale	Avg rating
Taiwan	SETTV	Mondays to Thursdays 20:00	26 March 2013	22 July 2013	-
Taiwan	ETTV	Mondays to Thursdays 22:00	26 March 2013	22 July 2013	-
Singapore	StarHub TV E City	Mondays to Fridays 19:00	12 June 2013	20 September 2013	-
Philippines	UNTV	TBA	TBA	TBA	
