= See You in Time =

2017 Taiwanese television series

- Promotional poster
- 已讀不回的戀人
- Genre: Romance, Sports, Fantasy, Science fiction
- Created by: Sanlih E-Television
- Written by: Chen Pei Wen (Ep. 1-11); Zhong Wei Heng (Ep. 1-11); Zhu Ying (Ep. 2-11); Mi Fei (Ep. 5-11); Huang Shi Ting (Ep. 5-11); Wang You Zhen; Mai Zhi Cheng; Chen Tang Ling (Ep. 1-4); Lan Meng He (Ep. 5, 8-16); Zhan Ah Mi (Ep. 1-7)
- Directed by: Luo An De (Ep. 1-10); Chen You Liang (Ep. 10-16); Chen Wei Zheng (Ep. 10-16)
- Starring: Hans Chung, Mini Tsai, Esther Huang, David Chiu
- Opening theme: (咖哩番薯) by Gary Chaw
- Ending theme: "The Lost Name" (你的名字) by Nine Chen
- Country of origin: Taiwan
- Original languages: Mandarin; Taiwanese; English; Cantonese
- No. of episodes: 16

Production
- Producer: Tong Yin
- Production locations: Taiwan (Kaoshiung, Taoyuan)
- Running time: 75 minutes
- Production companies: Sanlih E-Television; Tung Hsin Entertainment Co. Ltd

Original release
- Network: TTV; SET Metro
- Release: 10 December 2017 – 8 April 2018

Related
- Memory Love; Between

See You in Time (Chinese: 已讀不回的戀人; pinyin: yî dú bù huí dē liàn rén; literally "The Lover Who Won't Reply") is a 2017 Taiwanese television series created and produced by SETTV. It stars Hans Chung, Mini Tsai, Esther Huang and David Chiu as the main cast. Filming began on 23 September 2017 and ended in 20 March 2018. It was first broadcast on 10 December 2017 on TTV and airs every Sunday night from 10pm to 11.30pm.

== Cast ==
=== Main cast ===
- Hans Chung as Feng Ying
  - Zhan Kai Yu (詹鎧聿) as childhood Feng Ying
- Mini Tsai as Ji Zi Qi
- Esther Huang as Song Wei Wei
  - Zhuang Qing Qing (莊晴晴) as childhood Wei Wei
- David Chiu as Feng Xing Yu
  - Chen Yu Xiang (陳羽翔) as childhood Xing Yu

=== Supporting cast ===
- Johnny Yang as Han Sen
- Kuan Lin as Zhong Xiao Long
- Ray Yang as Zhou Li Bao
- Liu Yu Shan as Tang Yu Zhen
- Wen Chung Huang as Aster pro cycling team member, climber/domestique
- Onion as himself, a stray Shiba Inu
- Chou Zhi Ming as himself, cycling commentator from Hong Kong, and former Hong Kong cycling team coach, also the stunt and cycling co-ordinator of the drama
- Chen Chien-an as himself

== Soundtrack ==
- 咖哩番薯 by Gary Chaw
- The Lost Name 你的名字 by Nine Chen
- Power Clerk 心動店員 by Nine Chen
- Messages Seen 有去無回 by Nine Chen feat. Men Envy Children
- 就是我 by Gary Chaw
- 愛上你 by Chen Wei Ting (陳葦廷)
- 已讀不回的愛情 by Chen Wei Ting (陳葦廷)
- Maybe You Don't Understand 也許你不懂 by Astro Bunny
- Neon 霓虹 by Astro Bunny
- I Don't Want to Change the World 我不想改變世界 我只想不被世界改變 by 831
- Beedong 壁咚 by Mini Tsai

== Broadcast ==
Network	Country	Airing Date	Timeslot
TTV	Taiwan	December 10, 2017	Sunday 10:00-11:30 pm
Vidol	Taiwan	December 10, 2017	Sunday 11:30pm
iQiyi	Taiwan	December 11, 2017	Monday, 12:00am
SET Metro	Taiwan	December 16, 2017	Saturday 10:00-11:30 pm
TVB Chinese Drama	Hong Kong	February 3, 2018	Saturday 1:00-2:30 pm
Hub E City	Singapore	March 4, 2018	Sunday 10:15-11:45 pm
Astro Shuang Xing	Malaysia	May 7, 2018	Monday to Friday 4:00-5:00 pm

== Ratings ==
Air Date	Episode	Average Ratings	Rank
December 10, 2017	1	1.14	1
December 17, 2017	2	1.19	1
December 24, 2017	3	0.95	1
December 31, 2017: No episode was aired due to TTV airing of New Year’s Eve Special Program
January 7, 2018	4	0.90	1
January 14, 2018	5	0.84	1
January 21, 2018	6	1.04	1
January 28, 2018	7	0.91	1
February 4, 2018	8	0.84	2
February 11, 2018	9	0.87	1
February 18, 2018: Airing of "3 Kingdoms Chinese New Year Special Episode"
February 25, 2018	10	0.76	2
March 4, 2018	11	0.83	1
March 11, 2018	12	0.84	1
March 18, 2018	13	0.85	1
March 25, 2018	14	0.58	2
April 1, 2018	15	0.77	1
April 8, 2018	16	0.91	1
Average ratings		0.89	--
