= Sweet Relationship =

2007 Taiwanese television series

- Promotional poster
- Also known as: 美味關係; Měiwèi Guānxì; Delicious Relationship
- Genre: Romance
- Based on: Oishii Kankei by Satoru Makimura
- Directed by: Chu Yu-ning (瞿友寧)
- Starring: Vic Chou; Patty Hou; Alan Kuo; Megan Lai
- Opening theme: "愛上這世界" (In Love With This World) by Vic Chou
- Ending theme: "Don't Say Goodbye" by Alan Kuo
- Country of origin: Taiwan
- Original language: Mandarin
- No. of episodes: 20

Production
- Producer: Chai Zhi Ping (柴智屏)
- Running time: 90 mins (Sundays at 22:00 to 23:30)
- Production company: Comic Ritz International Production

Original release
- Network: Chinese Television System (CTS)
- Release: 16 September 2007 – 27 January 2008

Related
- Why Why Love (換換愛); Wish to See You Again (這裡發現愛)

Sweet Relationship (traditional Chinese: 美味關係; simplified Chinese: 美味关系; pinyin: Měiwèi Guānxì) is a 2007 Taiwanese drama series starring Vic Chou of F4, Alan Kuo, Megan Lai and Patty Hou. It is based on a Japanese josei manga Oishii Kankei (おいしい関係; lit. 'Delicious Relationship') by Satoru Makimura. It was produced by Comic Ritz International Production (可米瑞智國際藝能有限公司) with Chai Zhi Ping (柴智屏) as producer and directed by Chu Yu-ning (瞿友寧).

The series was first broadcast in Taiwan on free-to-air Chinese Television System (CTS) (華視) from 16 September 2007 to 27 January 2008, every Sunday from 22:00 to 23:30 and cable TV Gala Television (GTV) Variety Show/CH 28 (八大綜合台) from 22 September 2007 to 2 February 2008, every Saturday at 21:00. It received moderate ratings. The average rating of the drama after the final episode was 1.50.

== Synopsis ==
The story revolves around two polar opposites who wouldn't have met if it hadn't been for luck. Chang Bai Hui (Patty Hou) is a simple girl with extraordinary taste when it comes to food and dining. She could tell the difference between fine dining and a poor cooked meal in an instant. Ever since she was little, food has been the center of her world. It celebrated her college graduation and consoled her when her beloved father died.

Fang Zi Tian (Vic Chou) is a world-renowned Chef who finds no joy in his work, despite his skill with cooking.

By stroke of fate, their paths cross several times. Zi Tian is at first apprehensive to have Bai Hui near him, but he eventually gets used to her. Zi Tian regains his passion for cooking. Bai Hu grows up and matures as well.

== Cast ==
- Vic Chou (周渝民) as Fang Zi Tian 方織田
- Patty Hou (侯佩岑) as Chang Bai Hui 常百惠
- Alan Kuo (柯有綸) as He Ma Yang 何馬揚
- Megan Lai (賴雅妍) as Ren Ke Xin 任可欣
- Zhu De Gang (朱德剛) as Cheng Jia Jun 成家俊
- Teresa Ji (紀培慧) as Cheng Qiang 成薔
- Zhang Yong Zhi (張永智) as Gao Qiao 高橋
- Deng Jiu Yun (鄧九雲) as Lu Chuan Lin 陸川琳
- Billie (比莉) as Jin Dao Po Po 金刀婆婆
- Gu Xuan Chun (谷炫淳) as Gu Jian Xian 辜見賢
- Xu Zhen Wei (徐振偉) as B Pang B胖
- Eric Tu (涂百鋒) as Eric
- Cha Ma Ke (查馬克) as Cha Ke 查克
- Tang Qi as Tang Tang Jie 糖糖姐
- Gui Ye (龜爺) as Gui Ye
- Lin You Fang (林有方) as Zhu Rou Biao 豬肉彪
- Cai Jie De (蔡皆得) as Doctor Cai
- Luo Bei An (羅北安) as Duo Feng 多風
- Bao Ma (寶媽) as Bao Ma (ep01)
- Fei Zhen Hua (費鎮華) as Chang's father (ep01)
- Chien Te-men as Restaurant manager (ep01)
- Wang De Sheng (王德生) as Chang's family friend (ep01)
- Eric Chen as teenage Fang Zi Tian
- Matt Wu as Liang Hai Tao 梁海濤
- Tai Bao (太保) as Ma Yang's father
- Li Dai Ling (李黛玲) as Ma Yang's mother
- Weber Yang as Flyer distributor (cameo)

== Soundtrack ==
Sweet Relationship

Soundtrack album by Joanna Wang, Megan Lai, Alan Kuo, and Vic Chou
- Released: 17 December 2007
- Genre: Mandopop
- Language: Mandarin
- Label: Sony Music Entertainment (Taiwan)

Sweet Relationship Original Soundtrack (美味關係 電視原聲帶) was released on 17 December 2007 by Joanna Wang, Megan Lai, Alan Kuo, and Vic Chou under Sony Music Entertainment (Taiwan). It contains ten songs, in which four songs are various instrumental versions of some songs. The opening theme song is "Ai Shang Zhe Shi Jie" or "In Love With This World" by Vic Chou, while the ending theme song is by Alan Kuo entitled "Don't Say Goodbye".

=== Track listing ===
No.	Title	Singer(s)	Length
1.	"In Love With This World" (愛上這世界 (Ai Shang Zhe Ge Shi Jie))	Vic Chou
2.	"Don't Say Goodbye"	Alan Kuo
3.	"You And Me" (有你有我 (You Ni You Wo))	Megan Lai (賴雅妍)
4.	"Maze" (迷宮 (Mi Gong))	Joanna Wang
5.	"Intuition" (直覺 (Zhi Jue))	Megan Lai (賴雅妍)
6.	"I Love You"	Joanna Wang
7.	"Maze inst." (迷宮 (Mi Gong))
8.	"In Love With This World inst." (愛上這世界 (Ai Shang Zhe Ge Shi Jie))
9.	"Intuition inst." (直覺 (Zhi Jue))
10.	"Don't Say Goodbye inst."

== Reception ==
Chinese Television System (CTS) Ratings
Original Broadcast Date	Episode	Average Nationwide
16 September 2007	01	1.67
23 September 2007	02	1.50
30 September 2007	03	1.81
7 October 2007	04	1.50
14 October 2007	05	1.69
21 October 2007	06	1.77
28 October 2007	07	1.48
4 November 2007	08	1.46
11 November 2007	09	1.39
18 November 2007	10	1.35
25 November 2007	11	1.54
2 December 2007	12	1.63
9 December 2007	13	1.46
16 December 2007	14	1.46
23 December 2007	15	1.47
30 December 2007	16	1.28
6 January 2008	17	1.55
13 January 2008	18	1.37
20 January 2008	19	1.27
27 January 2008	20	1.42
Average Rating		1.50

Source: Chinatimes Showbiz

== International Broadcast ==
- It was aired in the Philippines through Q-11 which was dubbed in Tagalog on May 24 at 15:00 (PST) under the working title Magic Taste.
