= Attention, Love! =

- Promotional poster
- Genre: Romance, Comedy, Youth
- Created by: Eastern Television
- Written by: Jian Qi Feng; Lin Xin Hui
- Directed by: Huang Tian Ren
- Starring: Joanne Tseng; Prince Chiu; Kuo Shu-yao; Riley Wang
- Opening theme: Love is Happening by Prince Chiu
- Ending theme: Guess by Joanne Tseng
- Country of origin: Taiwan
- Original languages: Mandarin; Hokkien
- No. of episodes: 15

Production
- Producers: Chen Zhi Han; Phoebe Ma
- Production location: Taiwan
- Running time: 90 minutes
- Production company: Three Phoenixes Production Co. Ltd.

Original release
- Network: CTV; EBC Drama
- Release: 30 July – 5 November 2017

Attention, Love! (Chinese: 稍息立正我愛你; pinyin: shāo xí lìzhèng wǒ ài nǐ) was a 2017 Taiwanese television show produced by Eastern Television. The show starred Joanne Tseng, Prince Chiu, Kuo Shu-yao and Riley Wang. Filming began on October 12, 2016, and concluded on April 4, 2017. It aired on CTV every Sunday at 10:00 pm, for 15 episodes from 30 July 30 to 5 November 2017.

== Synopsis ==
A boy and a girl were destined to be together since birth. The two are the children of long-time best friends. One named their son Li Zheng, which means "attention", and the other named their daughter Shao Xi, which means "at ease". The two kids grew up to embody their names, with Li Zheng being diligent and paying extra attention to everything he wants to achieve in life and Shao Xi being more laid back and lazy in her approach to life and school. When Li Zheng returns to Taiwan after growing up in Japan, he meets Shao Xi for the first time since they were babies. Despite their polar opposite personalities, their fates bring them together.

== Cast ==
=== Main cast ===
- Joanne Tseng as Zhong Shao Xi
  - Liao Pei Yu as child Shao Xi
- Prince Chiu as Yan Li Zheng
  - Lin You Quan as child Li Zheng
- Riley Wang as Wang Jin Li
  - Hou Pin Chen as child Jin Li
- Kuo Shu-yao as An Xiao Qiao

=== Supporting cast ===
- Carolyn Chen as Zhou Chu Hong
- Bokeh Kosang as Zhong Run Fa
- Huang Xin Di as Li Ru Ping
- Greg Hsu as Jin Yu Bin (Xiao Yu)
- Dewi Chien as Bai Ruo Lin (Bai Bai)
- Zhang Guang Chen as Da Mao
- Barry Q as Ah Ke
- Scott Yang as Xiao Jian
- Wu Yun Ting as Wu Yi Lin (Yi Yi)
- Hana Lin as Lin Xiao Er (Xiao Er)
- Elaine Ho as He Shan (Shan Shan)
- Bye Bye Chu Chu as Nan Si

=== Cameo appearances ===
- Cheng-Peng Kao as great-grandfather
- Zhou Ming Fu as Yan Kuan Xiang
- Liao Yi Xuan as Lin Mei Yue
- Bai Bai as Hai Mei
- Ellen Wu as Kiki
- Berry Wen-i Kuo as Nan Si's girlfriend
- Lin Jia Feng as female class leader
- Lin Xiao Long as Xiao Ha
- Fan Jin Qi as Heng Heng
- Ye Hui Zhi as Zheng Jia Fen
- Lu Yan Ze as Ah Zhi
- Huang Hung Xuan as Teddy
- Jian Jie as Kai Di
- Ge Zi Xiang as principal of Lunghwa University

=== Special guests ===
- Bo Zi as bad oppa
- Lang Tsu-yun as Fu Ren Liang
- Hsieh Kun Da as Lin Zi Xiang
- Jeremiah Liu as Teacher Little Finger
- Ke Shu-qin as Teacher Yue E
- Pauline Lan as Lu Mei Hua
- Ko Chia-yen as Han Rong
- Darren Chiu as Wang Jin Wen
  - Shen Chang Hung as child Jin Wen
- Wang Dao-Nan as Wang Bo Hai
- Tseng Yu-Jia as geek senior

== Soundtrack ==
Soundtrack album by Various artists
- Released: 18 August 2017
- Genre: Mandopop
- Language: Mandarin
- Label: HIM International Music Inc.

Attention, Love! Original TV Soundtrack (OST) (稍息立正我愛你 電視原聲帶) was released on August 18, 2017 by various artists under HIM International Music Inc. It contains a total of 11 tracks. The opening theme is the first track of the album, "Love is Happening", by Prince Chiu, while the closing theme is the second track, "Guess", by Joanne Tseng.

=== Track listing ===
No.	Title	Singer(s)	Length
1.	"Love is Happening" (愛正在發生)	Prince Chiu	3:53
2.	"Guess" (猜猜看)	Joanne Tseng	4:16
3.	"Just Loving" (我愛著就好)	Janice Yan	4:01
4.	"Close To You" (OT:(They Long to Be))	Karencici	3:45
5.	"The Window" (窗)	Prince Chiu	4:47
6.	"Falling For You" (栽在你手裡)	Popu Lady	2:47
7.	"Mr. Popular" (萬人迷不迷)	Calvin Chen	3:31
8.	"You Better Not Think About Me" (你就不要想起我)	Hebe Tien	4:42
9.	"Give Me Your Love" (給我你的愛)	Tank	4:46
10.	"Leave Me Alone" (寂寞寂寞就好)	Hebe Tien	4:38
11.	"It Had to Be You" (非你莫屬)	Tank	4:49

== Broadcast ==
Network	Country	Airing Date	Timeslot
CTV	Taiwan	July 30, 2017	Sunday 10:00-11:30 pm
EBC Drama	Taiwan	August 6, 2017	Sunday 8:00-9:30 pm
EBC Variety	Taiwan	August 12, 2017	Saturday 10:00-11:30 pm

== Episode ratings ==
Competing dramas on rival channels airing at the same time slot were:
- FTV - The Best of Youth, Wake Up 2, TOP Secret
- TTV - The Masked Lover, Memory Love
- EBC Variety - Love, Timeless, Jojo's World
- CTS - Doctors

Air Date	Episode	Episode Title	Average Ratings	Rank
Jul 30, 2017	1	Curious Is What I Like Your Beginning 好奇 是我喜歡你的開端	1.15	2
Aug 6, 2017	2	The Perfect Distance Between Us Is 2 Meters And 20 Centimeters Behind You 我們之間最完美的距離 是跟在你身後的那兩公尺又20公分	1.02	1
Aug 13, 2017	3	Obviously Like You So Much But Don't Have Courage To Tell You 明明那麼喜歡你 卻再也沒有勇氣告訴你	1.30	1
Aug 20, 2017	4	Just Because We Are Best Friends?? 就因為我們是最好的朋友？？	1.27	1
Aug 27, 2017	5	Jealousy, Does It Equal To Like? 嫉妒，難道就等於喜歡嗎？	1.12	1
Sep 3, 2017	6	如果你只能給人帶來不幸，又憑什麼可以擁有幸福。	1.40	1
Sep 10, 2017	7	If One Day, You Have Someone You Like, You Have To Tell Me First. 如果有一天，你有喜歡的人，一定要第一個跟我說。	1.03	1
Sep 17, 2017	8	The Most Painful Thing About Loving Someone Secretly, Is That In Some Ways You Will Realize, All Of Your Avoidance And All Your Effort Are All Wasted. 單戀一個人最痛苦的是，你會發現，所有的努力與逃避都是徒勞無功。	1.07	1
Sep 24, 2017	9	Turn Around In One Circle, Or Only Like You. 繞了一圈，還是只喜歡你。	1.17	1
Oct 1, 2017	10	The So-called "Grown Up", It's Not Pretend To Don't Care About The Things. 所謂「長大」，並不是要對在乎的事物假裝若無其事。	1.15	1
Oct 8, 2017	11	Missing Every "Moment", Is Irreparable Regret. 錯過的每個「瞬間」，都是無法彌補的遺憾。	1.37	1
Oct 15, 2017	12	If One Day, You Have Someone You Like... 如果有一天，你有了喜歡的人...	1.48	1
Oct 22, 2017	13	I Like You, We Are Together, Okay? 我喜歡你，我們在一起，好嗎？	1.50	1
Oct 29, 2017	14	So, That's How Being In Love Feels Like! 原來，戀愛是這樣啊！	1.59	1
Nov 5, 2017	15	遇見你後，心底只容得下一首情歌Close to you！	1.49	1
Average ratings			1.27	--

== Awards and nominations ==
Year	Ceremony	Category	Nominee	Result
2018	23rd Asian Television Awards	Best Actress in a Leading Role	Joanne Tseng	Nominated
