= Mini Tsai =

Musical artist of Taiwan

Flo Tsai
- Tsai in 2024
- Born: 15 November 1987 (age 38); Taipei County, Taiwan (now New Taipei City, Taiwan)
- Education: Hsing Wu University
- Occupations: Actress, singer, television host
- Years active: 2008–present

Chinese name
- Traditional Chinese: 蔡黃汝
Transcriptions
Standard Mandarin
- Hanyu Pinyin: Cài Huángrǔ
- Musical career
- Also known as: Douhua Mei (豆花妹); Cai Huang-ru; Tsai Huang-ru; FLO

Flo Tsai Huang-ru (Chinese: 蔡黃汝; born 15 November 1987) is a Taiwanese actress, singer and television host. She made her television debut as a host of the long-running video gaming show GameGX. She has since appeared in several films and television series, including K Song Lover (2013), Crime Scene Investigation Center (2015), Back to 1989 (2016), The Masked Lover (2017) and Young Days No Fears (2020).

== Filmography ==
=== Television series ===
| Year | English title | Mandarin title | Role | Network | Notes |
|---|---|---|---|---|---|
| 2013 | Amour et Pâtisserie | 沒有名字的甜點店 | Rookie reporter | PTS | Episode 7 |
| 2013 | K Song Lover | K歌·情人·夢 | Nina | CTS; Star Chinese Channel | |
| 2013 | Lucky Touch | 我愛幸運七 | Liao Yung-chi | CTS | |
| 2015 | The New World | 新世界 | Lin Tzu-yen | TTV; GTV | |
| 2015 | Crime Scene Investigation Center | 鑑識英雄 | Jenny Wang | CTV | alternative title: CSIC: I Hero |
| 2015 | Constellation Women Series: Pisces | 星座愛情雙魚女 | Yu Shuang-shuang | Formosa TV; EBC | |
| 2015 | The Four Horsemen | 澀世紀傳說 | Hsing Chih-wu | iQiyi | |
| 2016 | Back to 1989 | 1989一念間 | Chen Ya-chuan | SET Metro; EBC | |
| 2017 | The Masked Lover | 我的愛情不平凡 | Wu Ping-an / Wu Ping-fan | SET Metro; TTV | |
| 2017 | The Perfect Match | 極品絕配 | Wu Ping-fan | SET Metro; TTV | Cameo |
| 2017 | See You in Time | 已讀不回的戀人 | Chi Tzu-chi | SET Metro; TTV | |
| 2019 | Crime Scene Investigation Center 2 | 鑑識英雄II 正義之戰 | Jenny Wang | CTV | alternative title: CSIC: I Hero 2 |
| 2020 | Young Days No Fears | 我的青春沒在怕 | Du Ming-Shan | SET Metro; TTV | 1/2 Female Lead |
| 2020 | The Haunted Heart | 腦波小姐 | Ding Yu | CTi Variety | |
| 2024 | A Fight for Justice | 無罪推定 | Hsu Yen-ching | PTS Taigi | |

=== Film ===
| Year | English title | Mandarin title | Role | Notes/Ref. |
|---|---|---|---|---|
| 2012 | Silent Code | BBS 鄉民的正義 | Lan Yi-ching | Teaser clip |
| 2012 | Light Up Love | 點·亮·愛 | Hsiao-chun | Short film |
| 2013 | The Harbor | 港都 | Hua Lin | |
| 2014 | Kiasu | 做你愛做的事 | Delia | |
| 2015 | Lion Dancing 2 | 鐵獅玉玲瓏2 | Chi | |
| 2015 | We Are Family | 我們全家不太熟 | Hsiao-chien | |
| 2016 | Hang in There, Kids! | 只要我長大 | Social worker | alternative title: Lokah Laqi |

=== Variety show ===
| Year | English title | Mandarin title | Network | Notes |
|---|---|---|---|---|
| 2009–2010 | GameGX | 電玩快打 | Videoland Television Network | Host |
| 2010 | Blow Out! | 打擊出去 | Videoland Television Network | Host |
| 2011 | Music Tsiau | 音樂強力佼 | CTS | Segment host |
| 2012 | Genius Go Go Go | 天才衝衝衝 | CTS | Guest host |
| 2012 | 10 Point Hall of Fame | 十點名人堂 | CTS | Host |
| 2015 | 100% Entertainment | 娛樂百分百 | GTV Variety Show | Guest host |

=== Music video appearances ===
| Year | Artist | Song title |
|---|---|---|
| 2012 | Will Pan | "Exclusive to You" |
| 2014 | Edison Lin | "That Summer" |
| 2015 | Tolaku | "Human Navigator" |
| 2016 | Daniel Chen | "A Sentence to Piss Off Your Girl Friend" |

== Discography ==
=== Studio albums ===
| Title | Album details | Track listing |
|---|---|---|
| Bomb Lover 情豆花開 | Released: 4 October 2011; Label: Universal Music Taiwan, Enjoy Records; Formats: CD, digital download | Track listing: 1. I Got to Hand It to You I 服了 U 2. Confession 告白; 3. Air Doll 空氣人形; 4. I'm Happy 我是幸福的; 5. Promise Me 答應我; 6. Be Nice 給我乖乖; 7. I'm a Wimp 遜掉; 8. Princess Charming 白馬公主; 9. Flying in the Moonlight 月光飛行; 10. I'll Admit That I Miss You 我承認我很想念 |

=== Extended plays ===
| Title | Album details | Track listing |
|---|---|---|
| Lucky Goddess (Debut Music Calendar) 幸運女神 – 初道紀念音樂年曆 | Released: 8 July 2010; Label: Universal Music Taiwan, Enjoy Records; Formats: CD, digital download | Track listing: 1. 豆花妹序語; 2. Lucky Goddess 幸運女神; 3. Little Tricks 小秘技; 4. 隱藏蜜語 |
| Beedong 壁咚 | Released: 18 September 2015; Label: Universal Music Taiwan, Enjoy Records; Formats: CD, digital download | Track listing: 1. Beedong 壁咚; 2. Eskimo 愛斯基摩; 3. Security 安全感 |

=== Soundtrack albums ===
| Title | Album details | Track listing |
|---|---|---|
| K Song Lover Original Soundtrack K歌·情人·夢電視原聲帶 | Released: 22 March 2013; Label: Warner Music Taiwan; Formats: CD, digital download | Track listing: 1. 變臉 |

== Published works ==
- Tsai, Mini (2014). 花花世界看見愛：大女孩VS.小女人‧蔡黃汝VS.豆花妹的率真告白. Taipei: Business Weekly Publications. ISBN 9789862725863.

== Awards and nominations ==
| Year | Award | Category | Nominated work | Result |
|---|---|---|---|---|
| 2016 | 2016 Sanlih Drama Awards | Best Actress | Back to 1989 | Won |
| 2016 | 2016 Sanlih Drama Awards | Best Screen Couple (with Yorke Sun) | Back to 1989 | Nominated |
| 2016 | 2016 Sanlih Drama Awards | Most Tear-Jerking Performance (with Yin Chao-te) | Back to 1989 | Nominated |
