= Memory Love =

2017 Taiwanese television series

- Promotional poster
- 噗通噗通我愛你
- Genre: Romance, Drama
- Created by: Sanlih E-Television
- Written by: Zhan Yun Ru; Chen Bai Zhong (Ep. 1-4); Xiao Zong Feng (Ep. 4-5); Wu Meng Huan (Ep. 6-7); Zhou Wen Qi (Ep. 17-18)
- Directed by: Feng Kai (Ep. 1-3); Ker Choon Hooi (Ep. 4-18)
- Starring: Andy Chen; Mandy Wei; Jolin Chien; Mandy Tao; Kris Shen; Nylon Chen
- Opening theme: "The Song You Picked Saves Me" (你點的歌救了我) by A-Lin feat. J.Sheon
- Ending theme: "You're Gone" by Bii
- Country of origin: Taiwan
- Original language: Mandarin
- No. of episodes: 18

Production
- Producers: Zheng Bo Yuan; Lin Yin Sheng; Sun Qi Ming
- Production location: Taiwan
- Running time: 75 minutes
- Production companies: Sanlih E-Television; Lesly Media; Na Hui International Entertainment Co., Ltd.

Original release
- Network: TTV; SET Metro
- Release: 6 August – 3 December 2017

Related
- The Masked Lover; See You in Time

Memory Love (Chinese: 噗通噗通我愛你; pinyin: pū tōng pū tōng wǒ ài nǐ; literally "Thump Thump I Love You") is a 2017 Taiwanese television series created and produced by SETTV. It stars Andy Chen, Mandy Wei, Jolin Chien, Mandy Tao, Kris Shen and Nylon Chen as the main cast. Filming began on 11 July 2017 and ended on 27 November 2017. It was first broadcast on 6 August 2017 on TTV and airs every Sunday night from 10pm to 11.30pm.

== Cast ==
=== Main cast ===
- Andy Chen as Xing Shao Tian (Louis)
  - Zhu You Cheng as child Shao Tian
- Mandy Wei as Qiao Jia En / Jin Jia En (Anne)
- Jolin Chien as Duan Ruo Fan
- Mandy Tao as Zhao Ai Li
- Kris Shen as Li Xiao Fei
- Nylon Chen as Wang Xiu Kai

=== Supporting cast ===
- Angus Kuo as Zhou Chao Qun
- Roy Chang as Ye Ni (Brownie)
  - Shen You Cheng (沈佑承) as child Brownie
- Cliff Cho as Napoleon
- Winnie Wu as Ou Fei Xiang
- Yang Chieh-mei as Xing Mei Yu
- Anthony Bao as Duan Chang Feng
- Doris Kuang as Jiang Hui Yuan
- Shen Meng-sheng as Jin Da Zheng
- Gail Lin as Zhang Mei Lan
- Sun Peng as Sun Hu (Brother Fei Hu)

=== Cameo ===
- Chen Chih-yuan as Brother Bao
- Cindy Yen as Jenny
- Hu Tien-lan as herself
- Chen Chi-hsia as orphanage director
- Ban Tie-hsiang as Brother Chen
- Chen Xian Lue as security at the membership club
- Chen Yu-mei as Qiao Shu Zhen
- Enson Chang as Marco
- Lin Yun Xi as Mei Miao
- Li Cheng Ta as Ah Da
- Lin Hsiu-chin as suit shop owner
- Chen Ting-hsuan as Ye Ke (Ye Zi)
- Chen Jia Kui as Stephen
- Zhu Jia Yi as Lily
- Chapman To as noodle stand owner
- Guan Jin Zong as physician

== Soundtrack ==
- "The Song You Picked Saves Me 你點的歌救了我" by A-Lin feat. J.Sheon
- "You're Gone" by Bii
- "Be Your Light" by Bii
- "I Need You Girl 愛你就夠了" by Bii
- "Think of You 我想你了" by Bii
- "Nothing at All" by Bii
- "Egg 蛋" by Bii
- "Pseudo-Single, Yet Single 未單身" by A-Lin
- "Breathing 呼吸" by J.Sheon
- "I Saw It Coming 以分手為前提" by Ailing Tai
- "Weakness 懦弱" by Ailing Tai
- "Dear World 親愛的世界" by Maggie Chiang

== Broadcast ==
Network	Country	Airing Date	Timeslot
TTV	Taiwan	August 6, 2017	Sunday 10:00-11:30 pm
SET Metro	Taiwan	August 12, 2017	Saturday 10:00-11:30 pm
TVB Chinese Drama	Hong Kong	September 30, 2017	Saturday 1:00-2:30 pm
Astro Shuang Xing	Malaysia	January 25, 2018	Monday to Friday 4:00-5:00 pm
Hub VV Drama	Singapore	March 23, 2018	Monday to Friday 7:00-8:00 pm
Kapamilya Channel/A2Z	Philippines	2021	TBA

== Ratings ==
Air Date	Episode	Episode Title	Average Ratings
Aug 6, 2017	1	The Memory Of Lemon Pie 記憶中的檸檬派	0.66
Aug 13, 2017	2	Boss' Tiramisu; Boss的提拉米蘇	0.75
Aug 20, 2017	3	Your Everything Belongs To Me 妳的一切都歸我管	0.71
Aug 27, 2017	4	I'll Always Be By Your Side To Protect You 我會一直在你身邊保護你	0.80
Sep 3, 2017	5	I Like You 我喜歡你	0.99
Sep 10, 2017	6	Seal Of The Heartbeat 封存的心跳聲	0.67
Sep 17, 2017	7	Princess' Wish 公主的願望	0.81
Sep 24, 2017	8	You're Gone	0.70
Oct 1, 2017	9	Tiramisu Confession 提拉米蘇告白	0.91
Oct 8, 2017	10	The Princess And The Knight 公主與騎士	0.96
Oct 15, 2017	11	Jia En And Ai Li 佳恩與艾莉	0.87
Oct 22, 2017	12	Frosting Of Happiness 幸福的糖霜	0.86
Oct 29, 2017	13	Memories Of Love 愛情記憶	0.84
Nov 5, 2017	14	Guard Your Heartbeat 守護你的心跳	0.85
Nov 12, 2017	15	Source Of Happiness 幸福的來源	1.02
Nov 19, 2017	16	Happiness Has An Expiration Date 幸福保存期限	0.87
Nov 26, 2017	17	Unbearable Burden 無法承受的負荷	0.86
Dec 3, 2017	18	Thump Thump I Love You 噗通噗通我愛你	0.93
Average ratings			0.84

Competing dramas on rival channels airing at the same time slot were:

- CTV - Attention, Love!
- CTS - Doctors
- EBC Variety - Jojo's World
- FTV - The Best of Youth, Wake Up 2, TOP Secret
