= Wu Chien-ho =

Taiwanese actor

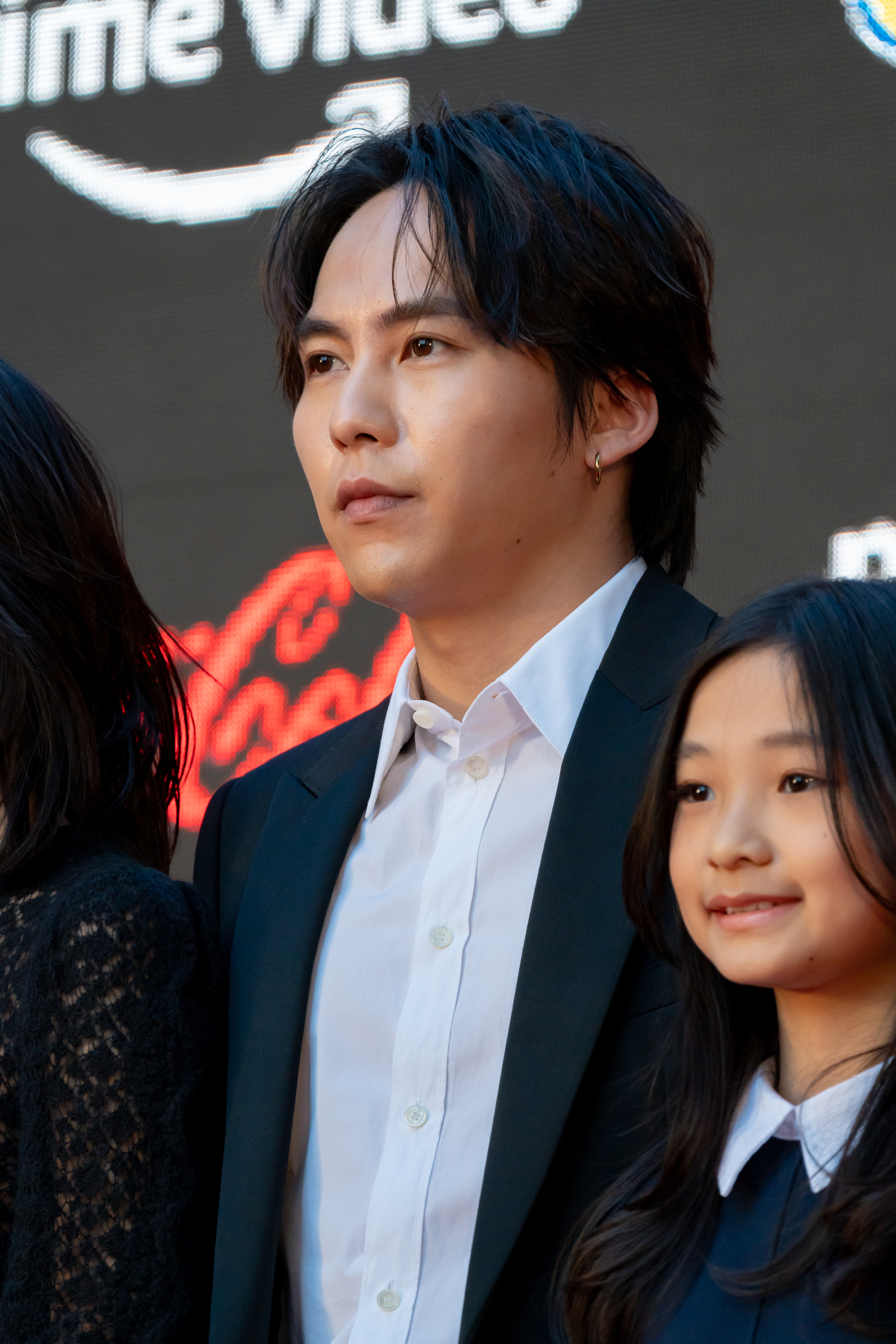
- Born: 2 May 1993 (age 32)
- Education: Chinese Culture University (BA)
- Occupation: Actor
- Years active: 2010–present

Chinese name
- Traditional Chinese: 巫建和
Transcriptions
Southern Min
- Hokkien POJ: Bû Kiàn-hô

Wu Chien-ho (Chinese: 巫建和; Pe̍h-ōe-jī: Bû Kiàn-hô; born 2 May 1993) is a Taiwanese actor, best known for his role as Hong Cheng-yi in the PTS miniseries Days We Stared at the Sun.

Wu graduated from the Chinese Culture University, where he majored in Chinese martial arts.

Wu won the Best Supporting Actor award at the Golden Bell Awards two years in a row with his first and second drama works.

== Filmography ==
=== Film ===
| Year | English title | Original title | Role | Notes |
|---|---|---|---|---|
| 2010 | The Kite in His Hand | 牽紙鷂的手 | The Blond-Haired | |
| 2010 | Days We Stared at the Sun | 他們在畢業的前一天爆炸 | Hóng Chéng Yī | |
| 2011 | Soldiers | 勇士們 | Dù Jùn | |
| 2012 | Together | | Ma Chih-hao | |
| 2016 | The Kids | | Pao-li | |
| 2019 | A Sun | 陽光普照 | A-Ho | |
| 2019 | The Last Thieves | 聖人大盜 | Tai-yi | |
| 2024 | Fly Me to the Moon | 但願人長久 | Xiao Yu | |
