= Bromance (Taiwanese TV series) =

- Promotional poster
- 愛上哥們
- Genre: romantic comedy, comedy, modern
- Created by: SETTV
- Written by: Fang Xiao Ren (方孝仁) (Screenwriter coordinator); Chen Bi Zhen (陳碧真) (Screenwriter coordinator); Shao Hui Ting (邵慧婷) (Screenwriter coordinator); Lin Pei Yu (林珮瑜); Zheng Han Wen (鄭涵文)
- Directed by: Chen Rong Hui (陳戎暉)
- Starring: Baron Chen; Megan Lai; Bii; Sean Lee; Katie Chen
- Opening theme: Epochal Times (心時代) by Bii, Andrew Tan, Ian Chen, Dino Lee
- Ending theme: Bottom Line (底線) by Landy Wen
- Country of origin: Republic of China (Taiwan)
- Original language: Mandarin
- No. of seasons: 1
- No. of episodes: 18; 30 (International ver.)

Production
- Executive producers: Pan Yi Qun (潘逸群); Chen Bi Zhen (陳碧真)
- Producers: Fang Xiao Ren (方孝仁); Rong Jun Yi (戎俊義)
- Production locations: Taiwan; Japan
- Running time: 90 minutes
- Production companies: Golden Bloom Production Co., Ltd. (金牌合作影像製作股份有限公司)

Original release
- Network: TTV; SETTV
- Release: October 18, 2015 – February 21, 2016

Related
- When I See You Again; Refresh Man

Bromance (Chinese: 愛上哥們; pinyin: Ài Shàng Gēmen) is a 2015–16 Taiwanese romantic comedy television series starring Baron Chen, Megan Lai, Bii, Sean Lee and Katie Chen. The series was produced by Sanlih E-Television and showcased every Sunday.

For her performance in Bromance, Megan Lai won Best Actress at the 2015 Sanlih Drama Awards.

== Plot ==
When Pi Ya Nuo (Megan Lai) was born, her arrival was eagerly received by her parents, extended family, and their fortune teller, who gathered in the delivery room to bless the beginning of the Pi Family's heir. Upon hearing her first cry, the fortune teller predicted on the spot that the baby "boy" would grow up to be a great success and a natural-born leader. But when the nurses announced that the baby was a girl, the stunned fortune teller immediately announced that the girl would not survive childhood unless she lived as a boy for the first 25 years of her life; only then could Ya Nuo change her bad fate and bring prosperity to her family.

Having lived her life as a boy, Ya Nuo was shy and always tried to keep her distance from people to hide her true identity. This mysterious aloofness made her irresistible to the girls around her. One day, she accidentally helped out Du Zi Feng (Baron Chen), who happened to be a triad leader, and his sister, Du Zi Han (Mandy Tao). While Zi Han fell in love with Ya Nuo, Zi Feng became Ya Nuo's "sworn brother" and best friend. Now, with her 26th birthday approaching, Ya Nuo hopes to reveal her true gender without any repercussions.

== Cast ==
=== Main cast ===
- Baron Chen as Du Zi Feng 杜子楓
- Megan Lai as Pi Ya Nuo 琵亞諾
- Bii as Wei Qing Yang 衛青陽
- Sean Lee as Chu Zhe Rui 楚哲瑞
- Katie Chen as Yang Na Na 楊娜娜

=== Supporting cast ===
- Mandy Tao as Du Zi Han 杜子涵
- Amanda Chou as Fan Xiao Jing 范小菁
- Yang Ming Wei as Liao Guang Chao 廖廣超
- Tou Chung-hua as Du Guang Zhu 杜光柱
- Linda Liu as Sister Feng
- Tang Chih-wei as Ya Nuo's father
- Wang Chuan as Ya Nuo's mother
- Joseph Hsia as Nan Xing Tian 南刑天
- Chen Wei Min as Wu Wan Hao 吳萬豪
- Edison Wang as Wu Han Sheng 吳翰昇

=== Special guest actors ===
- Samuel Tai as Master Yong Chun Quan
- Esther Wu as high school student
- Eunice Lin as high school student
- Fang Yu Xin (方語昕) as high school student
- Lia Lee as Amy Guo 郭Amy
- Cheng Xue Shu (程學書) as fortuneteller
- Titan Huang as boss
- Wang De Sheng (王德生) as Zi Feng's chief men
- He Jie Rou as child Xiao Jing
- Chiu Yi Tien as child Ya Nuo
- GJ as cruise ship singer
- Yumi Chao as child Zi Han
- Tsai Rui Ze as child Zi Feng
- Le Le (樂樂) as child Yan Ting
- Mario Pu as Magazine Editor
- ?? as child Zhe Rui
- Lin Xuan Yu (林萱瑜) as Eva
- Jin Wen as Wu Mei Li 盧美麗

== Soundtrack ==
- "Epochal Times" (心時代) by Bii, Andrew Tan, Ian Chen, Dino Lee
- "Bottom Line" (底線) by Landy Wen
- "Back in Time" (逆時光的浪) by Bii
- "Tender Love / Love you Gently" (愛是妳給的溫柔) by Bii
- "Quietness" (安靜) by Andrew Tan feat. Miu Zhu
- "Sunny Day" (晴天) by Derrick Hoh
- "Fake" (假裝不了) by Derrick Hoh
- "No One" (沒有之一) by GJ

== Production ==
Filming began on September 19, 2015 and the first media conference was held on September 29, 2015. The filming ended on February 3, 2016.

The show began airing on TTV Main Channel on October 18, 2015 and concluded on February 21, 2016. A total of 18 episodes were released. Later, the show was aired online on LINE TV beginning October 19, 2015, followed by showing on SET Metro (Chinese: 三立都會台).

=== Director ===
- Rong-hui Chen (陳戎暉)

=== Writers ===
- Pi-Chen Chen (陳碧真)
- Han-Wen Cheng (鄭涵文)
- Hsiao-Jen Fang (方孝仁)
- Pei-Yu Lin (林珮瑜)
- Hui-Ting Shao (邵慧婷)

=== Production Team ===
- Jun-Yi Rong (戎俊義), Producer
- Pi-Chen Chen (陳碧真), Executive Producer
- Ya-An Lo (羅雅安), Project Producer
- Hsiao-Jen Fang (方孝仁), Producer
- Yi-Chun Pan (潘逸群), Executive Producer

=== Stunt Coordinator ===
- Eddie Tsai

== Broadcast ==
Network	Country	First Aired	Timeslot
TTV	Taiwan	October 18, 2015	Sunday 10:00–11:30 pm
LINE TV	Taiwan	October 19, 2015	Monday 12:00
SETTV	Taiwan	October 24, 2015	Saturday 10:00–11:30 pm
Videoland Drama	Taiwan	April 9, 2016	Saturday to Sunday 8:00–10:00 pm
Eastern Broadcasting Company	Taiwan	August 24, 2016	Monday to Friday 9:00–10:00 pm
Vidol	Taiwan	August 24, 2016	Monday to Friday 10:00 pm
Rakuten Viki	Europe America India	October 18, 2015	Monday 12:00 am
E City	Singapore	December 5, 2015	Saturday 9:30–11:00 pm
Astro Shuang Xing	Malaysia	March 23, 2016	Monday to Friday 4:00–5:00 pm
Astro Shuang Xing HD	Malaysia	March 23, 2016	Monday to Friday 4:00–5:00 pm
Dimsum Entertainment	Malaysia Singapore Brunei	May 21, 2020	Series available on demand
J2	Hong Kong	July 19, 2016	Monday to Friday 7:00–8:00 pm
ホームドラマチャンネル	Japan	September 27, 2016	Tuesday 1:15–2:15 am
myTV SUPER	Hong Kong	June 4, 2017	Sunday 1:00–2:30 pm

The show was first broadcast on TTV on October 18, 2015. It aired in the Sunday night 10:00–11:30 pm time slot, which was previously occupied by When I See You Again (Chinese: 他看她的第2眼; pinyin: Tā Kàn Tā de Dì 2 Yǎn).

== Episode ratings ==
Competing dramas on rival channels airing at the same time slot were:
- CTV – The Day I Lost U, Marry Me, or Not?
- FTV – Aquarius, Capricorn

Air Date	Episode	Average Ratings	Rank
October 18, 2015	1	1.70	1
October 25, 2015	2	2.16	1
November 1, 2015	3	1.89	1
November 8, 2015	4	2.26	1
November 15, 2015	5	2.08	1
November 22, 2015	6	2.10	1
November 29, 2015	7	2.20	1
December 6, 2015	8	2.49	1
December 13, 2015	9	2.65	1
December 20, 2015	10	2.54	1
December 27, 2015	11	2.41	1
January 3, 2016	12	2.60	1
January 10, 2016	13	2.24	1
January 17, 2016	14	2.47	1
January 24, 2016	15	2.14	1
January 31, 2016	16	2.30	1
February 7, 2015: Airing of "2016 Super Star: A Red & White Lunar New Year Special"
February 14, 2016	17	1.96	1
February 21, 2016	18	2.88	1
February 28, 2016	Special Episode	1.08	2
Average ratings		2.28	--

== Awards and nominations ==
Year	Award	Category	Recipient	Result
2015	Sanlih Drama Awards	Best Actor Award	Baron Chen	Nominated
2015	Sanlih Drama Awards	Best Actress Award	Megan Lai	Won
2015	Sanlih Drama Awards	Viewers Choice Drama Award	Bromance	Nominated
