= Miss Rose =

- Promo poster
- Also known as: Miss Screws To get Married, 螺丝小姐要出嫁
- 螺絲小姐要出嫁
- Genre: Romance, Comedy
- Created by: Sanlih E-Television
- Written by: Lai Yi Lin 賴意林; Lin Yi Jun 林宜君; Bì Cuì Si 碧翠絲
- Directed by: Chen Xi Sheng 陳希聖; Zhang Xiu Cheng 張修誠; Danny Dun鄧安寧
- Starring: Megan Lai; Roy Chiu; Paul Hsu 許騰方; Tia Lee; Chunya Chao 趙駿亞; Puff Guo
- Opening theme: "Sneezing (fast version)" by Yen-j
- Ending theme: "One In A Thousand" by Della Ding
- Country of origin: Taiwan
- Original language: Mandarin
- No. of series: 1
- No. of episodes: 23

Production
- Executive producer: Chen Xi Sheng 陳希聖
- Producers: Li Liguo 李立國; Chen Yijun 陳一俊; Cai Pei Ying 蔡姵纓
- Production location: Taiwan
- Running time: 90 minutes
- Production company: Sanlih E-Television

Original release
- Network: TTV
- Release: 22 July – 30 December 2012

Related
- Love Forward 向前走向愛走; King Flower

Miss Rose (Chinese: 螺絲小姐要出嫁; pinyin: Luo Si Xiao Jie Yao Chu Jia) is 2012 Taiwanese romantic comedy television series starring Megan Lai, Roy Chiu as the main leads, with Paul Hsu, Tia Lee, Chunya Chao and Puff Guo in supporting roles. The original title literally translates as "Miss Screws to get married" which is in reference to Megan Lai's character name which pronunciation sounds the same as "screw" in Mandarin and Roy Chiu's character "Gao Cheng Kuan" referring his workers as "screws", mentioned in episode 1. Filming began on June 9, 2012 and finished on December 6, 2012. First episode began airing on July 22, 2012 and finished on December 30, 2012 with 23 episodes total. The drama was filmed while it aired.

== Synopsis ==
When a hardworking office lady is told by a fortune teller that she will never get married, she makes a bet with the fortune teller that she will prove her reading wrong or else she will give her $1 million. She meets a heartless, stern and cold CEO of a company who has no compassion for his employees who will eventually become her new boss. At first both can't stand each other but after working closely with each other they learn to trust each other and love blossoms between the two. But it won't be easy for their love to survive when he has a fiancée who won't let go and she has a former boyfriend who wants her back.

== Plot summary ==
Luo Si Yi is the hardest working person in her company. On a whim, she goes to see a fortune teller who tells her she will never get married. Furious of the reading she has just received she makes a wager with the fortune teller by saying she will get married within a year and if she can't she will pay the fortune teller $1,000,000. Si Yi goes on many blind dates where she is insulted by guys who are not up to standards that tell her she is old and past her age for marriage and to have children.

Gao Cheng Kuan is a corporate raider and heartless CEO who sees his employees as screws. Any screws that are rusted should be thrown out and any that are loose needs to be screwed on tightly. He himself is also in a difficult position since he has betrothed to his bosses spoiled daughter who he does not love and always having to prove his worth to his boss and his daughter.

When Si Yi is sent by her lazy boss to get a cake for the head of their company birthday party she meets Cheng Kuan when she accidentally splatters a cake and ruins his expensive suit. Not having the proper attire to a corporate takeover meeting he is helming it causes him to not show up to the meeting and lose his chance at taking over a company. This causes conflict between him and his future father-in-law which result in Cheng Kuan being sent to run the light company that Si Yi works for in order to prove himself again. Si Yi and Cheng Kuan have a further misunderstanding of each other when she goes to work on the weekend to catch up and he shows up in casual clothes to scope out the company. She mistakes him for a burglar, stalker, and pervert, but later finds out that he is her new boss.

Seeing how everyone at the lighting company is lacking and lazy, Cheng Kuan soon learns to trust only Si Yi, the hardest working person in the company. She becomes his assistant at the company and romance between the two starts to blossom when they go on a business trip together, but his fiancée is not happy with Cheng Kuan loving another woman even though she doesn't love him because she doesn't like her things being taken from her. Cheng Kuan soon has to make the decision of giving up as future CEO of a huge corporation, something he has worked hard for all his life to be with the woman he loves or staying in a loveless relationship to keep what he has worked hard for.

== Cast ==
=== Main cast ===
- Megan Lai 賴雅妍 as Luo Si Yi 羅思儀 - Female age 31

She's an hardworking Office Lady at Guang Qiang LED Corp (a lighting company) who wakes up early to give all of her superiors wake up calls, picks up the flowers from the florist each morning for display at the office and buys the cake and party favors whenever there is a celebration needed in the office. A fortune teller tells her she will never get married, not being able to accept her fortune reading she challenges the fortune teller, by waging a bet that she can get married within a year. One day the parent company of the company she works for, sends over their top exec Gao Cheng Kuan to restructure and run the company because the CEO is not happy with the declining profits. She becomes Cheng Kuan's assistant at the office. At first she hated him thinking he is a pervert because of an earlier misunderstanding.

- Roy Chiu 邱澤 as Gao Cheng Kuan 高丞寬 - Male age 32

He is the top exec at Yi Ren Group. He is a cold, ruthless, impatient and arrogant businessman. His boss Jiang Chu Lian is extremely impress with him and betroths his daughter Vivian to him so he can be the future CEO of his company. His future father-in-law sends him to Guang Qiang LED Corp in order to restructure and turn the company into a profitable company. He refuses at first and threatens to resign deeming it as an embarrassment to his career if he works as Guang Qiang LED Corp, but Jiang Chu Lian reminds him that he will be taking over his company one day and should take the position to further prove himself.

- Paul Hsu 許騰方 as Guan Sheng Jun 關勝君 - Male age 28

Gao Cheng Kuan's driver and trusted personal assistant. He is Cheng Kuan voice of reason and right hand man when making decisions. He has a crush on Zhong Xiao Ke and does not know at first that she is already engaged to someone else.

- Tia Lee 李毓芬 as Zhong Xiao Ke 鍾小可 - Female age 27

Luo Si Yi happy go lucky carefree friend and Ah Ze's fiancee, She owns and operates a coffee and tea shop. She tries to get Si Yi to be more relaxed in order for her to be able to land a husband within a year. She thought she was in a loving, devoted and secure relationship with her fiancee Ah Ze, only to find out in the worst way that he was secretly having an affair outside.

- Zhao Jun Ya 趙駿亞 as （Eddi）Tang Yi Chun 湯以尊 - Male age 32

Luo Si Yi's ex-boyfriend who broke her heart publicly when she found out he had a fiancee on the side and that the two would be leaving for the U.S. to get married. They cross paths again when Guang Qiang LED Corp and a rival company is trying to recruit him. She is asked by her bosses to attend an event he will be at to present a proposal to bid for his interest in joining their company.

- Puff Guo 郭雪芙 as Vivian Jiang 江薇安 - Female age 28

Gao Cheng Kuan's fiancee and Jiang Chu Lian's daughter. She is the typical spoil rich girl who thinks she is above all. She and Gao Cheng Kuan are in a loveless for business purposes only relationship, they only stay together for the sake of her father. He to be CEO of the company and her to be a future high society wife.

=== Supporting cast ===
- Zhao Zheng Ping 趙正平 as Wu Jian Shu 吳建樹 - Male age 40

He is President of Guang Qiang LED Corp. He is a lazy boss who does not care about the profits of his company. He plays hooky all day and lives off of investors money. He is not happy when Gao Cheng Kuan is sent to restructure his company and tells all of his employees not to help Cheng Kuan.

- Jack Na Wei Xun 那維勳 as Kang You Wei 康有為 - Male age 33

General Manager of Guang Qiang LED Corp and Luo Si Yi's Supervisor. Like Wu Jian Shu, he is also a lazy boss. Originally the Deputy Chief of Guang Qiang LED Corp, he is demoted to General Manager position when Gao Cheng Kuan arrives to work at the company.

- Yvonne Yao Cai Ying 姚采穎 as Song Ting Ai 宋廷嬡 - Female age 31

Works at Guang Qiang LED Corp. She uses her flirty and sexy appearance to get on the bosses good side.

- Yin Fu 茵芙 as Chen Maio Jin 陳妙津 - Female age 25

Kang You Wei's secretary. She is a worrywart, she'll cry at the slight hearing of problems at Guang Qiang LED Corp. She looks up to Si Yi and tries to help her whenever it is possible.

- Akio Chen as Luo Yun Biao 羅雲標 - Male age 54

Luo Si Yi and Luo Si Qi's loving father. Zeng Mei Nu's husband. He owns and runs a dry cleaning business. His younger daughter married sooner than his older daughter. his biggest desire is for his older daughter Si Yi to get married, but being a caring father he does not push her as he only wants her to be happy.

- Yang Li-yin 楊麗音 as Zeng Mei Nu 曾美女 - Female age 53

Luo Si Yi and Luo Si Qi's loving but gossipy mother. She is always telling Si Yi to not overwork herself and look for a husband instead.

- Stephanie Chang Pei Ying 張珮瑩 as Luo Si Qi 羅思齊 - Female age 29

Luo Yun Biao's and Zeng Mei Nu's younger daughter. Luo Si Yi's younger sister. Tang Mu's wife. She got married before her older sister. She and her husband are in a loving marriage and tend to be affectionate with each other in public without caring what others think.

- Ying Wei-min 應蔚民 as Tang Mu 湯姆 - Male age 31

Luo Si Qi's loving and affectionate husband. Luo Yun Biao's and Zeng Mei Nu's son-in-law. Luo Si Yi's brother-in-law. He dated Luo Si Qi when they were in High School and got married right after graduating from school.

- Ai Wei 艾偉 as Jiang Chu Lian 江楚濂 - Male age 55

CEO of Yi Ren Group. Vivian's father. He deeply cares about and spoils his only child Vivian. He is extremely impress with Gao Cheng Kuan's ways of business dealing and wants him to be the future CEO of his company and Son-in-law.

- Lang Tsu-yun 郎祖筠 as Lily - Female age 40

The fortune teller who gave a reading to Luo Si Yi and told her she will never get married. If she loses Si Yi bet she will have to pole dance at Si Yi's wedding.

- Chris Lee 李至正 as Ah Ze 阿哲 - Male age 28

Zhong Xiao Ke fiancee. He acts like a loving and devoted boyfriend but secretly he was having an affair with Song Ting Ai.

- Pan Li Li 潘麗麗 as Yue Xiang 月香 - Female

Gao Cheng Kuan's mother. She cares about her son. She thought Vivian would be the greatest daughter-in-law to have.

=== Cameos ===
- Chen Ya Lin 陳雅琳 as herself - Female

Gao Cheng Kuan goes on her news talk show thinking it will highlight all his business accomplishments but instead he is surprise attacked by the host questioning his ethic on how he runs a business.

- Guan Jin Zong 管謹宗 as Mr. Chen 陳董事長 - Male

Chairman of a company Gao Cheng Kuan was in the process of an hostile takeover but because Luo Si Yi ruins his suit at a bakery (the first time they meet), he does not make it to the takeover meeting in time to sign the takeover documents.

- Gao Ting Yu 高廷宇 as Wen Bin 文彬 - Male

Works at Guang Qiang LED Corp. One of Kang You Wei's assistants.

- Lu Yi Long 陸一龍 as Xie Zheng Tang 謝正堂 - Male

Guang Qiang LED Corp largest shareholder and Chairman.

- Zhu De Gang 朱德剛 as Chen Yi Jun 陳一俊 - Male

Luo Si Yi's blind date who turns out to be extremely rude and a slob.

- Xie Qiong Nuan 謝瓊煖 as Magazine Editor 陸惠玲 - Female

Magazine editor who was going to chronicle Gao Cheng Kuan's and Vivian's wedding.

- Luo Bei An 羅北安 as Mr. Wang 王董事長 - Male

Chairman of a rival company who gives bribe money to Wu Jian Shu and Kang You Wei to make sure Gao Cheng Kuan fails at making Guang Qiang LED Corp a profitable company.

- Bonnie Yu 余函彌 as Xiang Xiang 湘湘 - Female

Tang Yi Chun's secret fiancee who he breaks up with Luo Si Yi for.

== Soundtrack ==
No official soundtrack album was released for "Miss Rose". The opening theme song is "Sneezing (fast version) 打噴嚏（發燒快版）" by Yen-j and the closing theme song is "One In A Thousand 好難得" by Della Ding.

=== Songs ===
- Sneezing (fast version) 打噴嚏（發燒快版）by Yen-j 嚴爵
- Sneezing (slow version) 打噴嚏（過敏慢版）by Yen-j 嚴爵
- Simple Love 單細胞 by Yen-j 嚴爵
- One In A Thousand 好難得 by Della Ding 丁噹
- Not As Good As 倒不如 by Della Ding 丁噹
- Not Brave Enough 不夠勇敢 by Della Ding 丁噹
- I Am Still the Same 我還是一樣 by Della Ding 丁噹

=== Albums ===
Songs from the soundtrack are taken from the following artiste self albums:
- Yen-j's 2011 album "Simple Love (单细胞)"
- Della Ding's 2012 album "One In A Thousand (好難得)"

== Publications ==
- September 17, 2012: Miss Rose Original Novel (螺絲小姐要出嫁 原創小說) - ISBN 9789571356464 Gold Fish Publishing Co., Ltd. 金魚喬伊著 - Author: Sanlih E-Television 三立電視監製

== Filming locations ==
"Miss Rose" was filmed entirely in various cities and counties throughout Taiwan.

=== Keelung ===
- Badouzi Night Market 八斗子夜市

=== Taipei ===
- Lao-Teng Food & Restaurant 荖藤酒窖
- Gian 6 degrees Coffee 喬安拾豆
- FamilyMart 全家湖濱店 - No. 104, Lane 103, Section 2, Nèihú Rd, Neihu District Taipei City, Taiwan 114
- Franz and Friends 城市舞台藝文沙龍
- Franz Café 法藍瓷咖啡
- Daan District Taipei Police Station 臺北市政府警察局大安分局 - No. 17, Lane 23, Ruìan St, Daan District Taipei City, Taiwan 106
- Siwei Laundry 四維洗衣店 - No. 2, Lane 192, Sìwei Rd, Daan District Taipei City, Taiwan 106

=== New Taipei ===
- New Taipei City Sunshine Bridge 新北市新店區陽光橋
- An Keng Sun Sports Park 陽光運動公園
- Everlight Electronics Co., Ltd. 億光電子工業股份有限公司
- Pinglin Old Bridge 坪林舊橋
- Fullon Hotel Shenkeng 福容大飯店深坑
- Ping Hsi Shifen Old Street 平溪老街

=== Yilan County ===
- Tai Mall 京師百貨
- Yilan County Hall 宜蘭縣政府

=== Taoyuan County ===
- Fastek Lighting International, Inc. 光鈦國際股份有限公司

=== Pingtung County ===
- National Museum of Marine Biology and Aquarium 國立海洋生物博物館

== Broadcast ==
"Miss Rose" first original airing began on Taiwanese Sanlih channel TTV on July 22, 2012 every Sunday night at 10:00 PM, final episode was aired on December 30, 2012 with 23 episodes total. Each episode running time is 90 minutes with commercials included.

Channel	Country/Location	Airing Date	Timeslot
TTV	Taiwan	July 22, 2012	Sunday 10:00 PM
SET	Taiwan	July 28, 2012	Saturday 11:30 PM (starting 11/10) 10:00 PM
ETTV	Taiwan	August 5, 2012	Sunday 7:30 PM
LTV HD	Taiwan	January 22, 2013	Monday-Friday 9:00 PM
PPS	China	June 6, 2012	Sunday 10:00 PM
Youku	China	June 6, 2012	Sunday 10:00 PM
iQIYI.COM	China	June 6, 2012	Sunday 10:00 PM
TVB J2	Hong Kong	March 10, 2013	Sunday 8:30 PM
Astro	Malaysia	March 28, 2013	Monday-Friday 10:30 PM
True Asian Series	Thailand	September 15, 2013	Friday-Sunday 7:00 PM
Vietnamese Broadcasting Services	United States	Unknown	9:00 pm

== Episode ratings ==
"Miss Rose" ranked number one in its time slot throughout its original airing with a total average of 3.49. The viewers survey was conducted by AGB Nielsen with a survey range of over 4 years old TV audience.

Competing dramas on rival channels airing at the same time slot were:
- CTS - Alice in Wonder City, Waking Love Up
- FTV - Absolute Darling, Once Upon a Love
- CTV - Ia Ia, I Do, Die Sterntaler

Air Date	Episode	Title	Average Ratings	Rank
July 22, 2012	01	A Lonely Life... A Peaceful Life! 一世孤單 一生平安！	2.37	1
July 29, 2012: No episode was aired due to TTV airing the "2012 London Olympics Special"
August 5, 2012	02	Miss Screw, Mr. Patch. 螺絲小姐，補洞先生。	2.76	1
August 12, 2012	03	What Am I In Your Heart? 在妳心裡，我算什麼？	3.37	1
August 19, 2012	04	Lecher, Pervert, Peeping Tom. 痴漢、色狼、偷窺狂。	3.22	1
August 26, 2012	05	Girlfriend In Name Only 形式上的女朋友	4.35	1
September 2, 2012	06	Quietly Creeping Into Cheng Kuan's Heart 悄悄鑽進寬寬的心	3.83	1
September 9, 2012	07	We Are The Only Ones Here, Understand? 這裡只有我們，知道嗎？	3.96	1
September 16, 2012	08	Silly Things Boys Would Do 男生會做的蠢事	3.73	1
September 23, 2012	09	Luckily You're Here 幸好有你	3.70	1
September 30, 2012	10	There're No Medicine For Regret In This World 世上沒有後悔的藥	3.35	1
October 7, 2012	11	The Value Of Love 愛情的價值	3.82	1
October 14, 2012	12	Hypothetical Question 假設性的問題	3.72	1
October 21, 2012	13	I'm Leaving So I Can Be Close To You 離開才能靠近妳	4.19	1
October 28, 2012	14	Kiss And Change Sides 親一下，換一邊	4.04	1
November 4, 2012	15	Something Must Be Wrong 一定有鬼	3.95	1
November 11, 2012	16	Who's The Third Party? 誰是小三？	3.50	1
November 18, 2012	17	Call Me Cheng Kuan 叫我寬寬	3.13	1
November 25, 2012	18	Let's Be Together Forever 我們要一直在一起	3.35	1
December 2, 2012	19	Will You Marry Me? 嫁給我好不好?	3.28	1
December 9, 2012	20	A Temporary Test 暫時的考驗	2.90	1
December 16, 2012	21	Overcoming All Obstacles 關關難過，關關過	2.61	1
December 23, 2012	22	Only A Few Steps Away From Happiness 離幸福只差一點點	2.61	1
December 30, 2012	23	I Do! 我願意！	4.18	1
Average ratings			3.49	
