= Our Times =

- Theatrical release poster

Chinese name
- Traditional Chinese: 我的少女時代
- Simplified Chinese: 我的少女时代
Transcriptions
Standard Mandarin
- Hanyu Pinyin: Wǒ De Shàonǚ Shídài
- Directed by: Frankie Chen
- Written by: Tseng Yung-ting
- Produced by: Yeh Ju-fen
- Starring: Vivian Sung; Darren Wang; Dino Lee; Dewi Chien
- Cinematography: Chen Kuo-Lung; Chiang Min-chung
- Edited by: Ku Cheng-yen; Wenders Li
- Music by: Hou Chih-chien
- Production companies: Focus Films; Hualien Media International; Huace Pictures (Tianjin)
- Distributed by: Hualien Media International
- Release date: 14 August 2015 (Taiwan)
- Running time: 134 minutes
- Country: Taiwan
- Language: Mandarin
- Budget: US$2.7 million
- Box office: US$84.4 million

Our Times (Chinese: 我的少女時代; pinyin: Wǒ De Shàonǚ Shídài, literally "The Time of My Maiden Years") is a 2015 Taiwanese teen romantic comedy-drama film directed by Frankie Chen. It is the feature film directorial debut of Chen, who previously directed television dramas. The film stars Vivian Sung as Lin Cheng-hsin (Chinese: 林真心; lit. 'Lin Truly'), an ordinary school-girl, Darren Wang as Hsu Tai-yu, the school's notorious gang leader, and Dino Lee as Ouyang Fei-Fan, the school's most popular male student.

== Plot ==
In the present day, Lin Truly (Joe Chen) is an ordinary office worker who leads a stressful life. Her name, "Truly", literally means "sincere of heart", reflecting her hard-working nature which often gets her ridiculed by her younger subordinates. Dejected, she listens to a cassette recording of an old Andy Lau song. This brings her back to her high school days, when she was an ordinary high school girl, who idolized Lau and lived a simple, care-free life. She had a crush on Ouyang Fei-Fan, (Dino Lee), the school's most popular male student, and had two good girl friends.

One day, seventeen-year-old Lin (Vivian Sung) receives a chain letter, warning her of impending doom if she does not pass the message on. Naively, she passes it on to Hsu Tai-yu (Darren Wang), the school's notorious gangster boss, her math teacher and Tao Min-min (Dewi Chien), the school's most popular girl. While Hsu Tai-yu is reading the letter, he gets hit by a car. After weeding out the letter's sender, the angry Hsu Tai-yu makes Lin Truly his 'friend' and forces her to run errands for him in exchange for leaving Ouyang alone, thus making her his errand-girl.

By chance, Lin Truly accidentally overhears a conversation between Min-min and Ouyang and discovers that they are in a secret relationship. Dejected, she creates an alliance with Hsu Tai-yu, who likes Tao Min-min, to break the couple up. While looking through Ouyang's past year book, Lin Truly discovers that both Ouyang and Tai-yu were once classmates. She then proceeds to ask Ouyang about it; he reveals that both he and Tai-yu were once good friends. However, after the tragic death of one of their friends, Tai-yu became withdrawn and transferred out of their school, eventually becoming the gangster boss in high school.

Later, Lin Truly challenges Tai-yu to a roller-skating race, whereby the winner can ask the loser to fulfill a request. She manages to win the race, before admitting to Tai-yu that she knows about his past from Ouyang. She then requests that Tai-yu goes back to the person he was before, and not the gangster boss he is now. Moved by Lin Truly's words, Tai-yu starts improving his behaviour in school. He also starts studying with Lin Truly during and after school.

Throughout the year, Lin Truly and Hsu Tai-yu begin to understand each other better, and their friendship evolves as they began to learn a thing or two about true love. Eventually, Lin truly starts developing romantic feelings for Hsu Tai-yu.

Tai-yu manages to place 10th in the school's mock exam, much to the surprise of his classmates. However, the school's new Director is skeptical of his improvement and punishes him for allegedly cheating in the exam despite not having proof. Tai-yu is forced to run 50 rounds around the school's running track, which causes him to collapse due to heat stroke.

Angered by the unfairness of the Director, Lin Truly starts a campaign within the school to raise awareness about the Director's mistreatment of Tai-yu and the students in general. This comes to a head during the school's festival event, where the students led by Lin Truly intentionally commit various school offenses in jest as protest against the Director, ultimately causing the school's Principal to give in to their demands.

During a camping trip together with their friends, Lin Truly and Tai-yu both promise to never forget each other after they go their separate ways after high school.

The day before Lin Truly's birthday, she receives a recording from Tai-yu as a present, which she is to listen only after the university entrance exam.

On her birthday, Lin Truly sees Tai-yu and eagerly drags him aside to let him sign her yearbook. However, Tao Min-min suddenly shows up by his side. Tai-yu explains that she confessed to him earlier that she likes him and that they are now together, before wishing Lin Truly the best with Ouyang. Lin Truly is devastated, and after congratulating Tai-yu, breaks down in tears alone.

Hsu Tai-yu later discovers that he has a blood clot in his brain, caused by the car accident and further exacerbated by his frequent brawling and falls. His parents decide to send him overseas, leaving Lin Truly with no way to contact him.

After the university entrance exams, Lin Truly decides to listen to the recording. In it, Tai-yu says that although they both fulfilled their initial promise to court both Ouyang and Tao Min-min, Tai-yu admits to his feelings for Lin Truly, and asks her to always remember him in her heart.

In the present day, Lin Truly leaves her job and relationship upon having rediscovered herself. She is still unable to book a ticket to an Andy Lau concert that is set to take place in Taipei. While buying a drink outside the concert venue, she happens to bump into Andy Lau himself. Seeing that Lin Truly is a huge fan of his, Andy Lau gives her the contact of a person who can get her into the concert. Before the concert begins, Lin Truly calls the number, who is revealed to be Hsu Tai-yu (Jerry Yan). Hsu Tai-yu tells that he can finally fulfill his promise made in high school of getting Andy Lau to sing for her, and they both reunite.

== Cast ==
- Vivian Sung as young Lin Cheng-hsin (Truly) (林真心)
  - Joe Chen as grown-up Lin Cheng-hsin (Truly) (林真心)
- Darren Wang as young Hsu Tai-yu (徐太宇)
  - Jerry Yan as grown-up Hsu Tai-yu (徐太宇)
- Dino Lee as Ouyang Fei-fan (歐陽非凡)
- Dewi Chien as Tao Min-min (陶敏敏)
- Ian Chen as Ying Mu / Sakuragi (櫻木), one of Tai-yu's gang buddies
- Da-her Lin as Da He (大賀), one of Tai-yu's gang buddies
- Tsai Yi-chen as Ho Mei (何美), Cheng-hsin's good friend.
- Chung Hsin-ling as Lin's mother.
- Andy Lau as himself

== Production ==
Our Times is the directorial debut for Frankie Chen, who previously produced Taiwanese television dramas.

== Release ==
Outside of Taiwan, Our Times was released in Hong Kong and Macau box office on 15 October 2015. It was then simultaneously released in both Singapore and Malaysia on 22 October 2015. The film was released in China on 19 November 2015.

Out of Asia, Our Times was screened during the Toronto Reel Asian International Film Festival on 8 November 2015.

Our Times has often been compared to the 2011 hit romance film You Are the Apple of My Eye, which features a similar school-based romance plot line and takes places in the same time period (1990s). The Associated Press characterised the film as "the female version" of You Are the Apple of My Eye. However, the director and cast members dismiss this comparison, with director Chen questioning "How can my youth be the same as someone else's?".

== Reception ==
=== Box office ===
As of 20 January 2016, the film has grossed $84,400,000 world-wide, with its largest territory being mainland China with $54,800,000.

Our Times was drawn into a box office dispute when the Taipei Theater Association, who distributes box office data, stopped publishing such data shortly before this film was released. Despite the absence of official box office data, the film's distributor, Hualien International Film, announced publicly that the film topped the Taiwanese box office. This has led to accusations that Hualien International Film, which counts major Taiwanese cinema chains Ambassador and Showtime as investors, deliberately stopped the release of box office results so that it could falsify reports of the film's box office performance.

Notwithstanding the dispute over the film's box office gross, Our Times performed well at the Taiwanese box office. The film grossed over NT$5,000,000 from its sneak preview screenings prior to its official box office launch. In the first week of its release in Taiwan, the film achieved a box office gross of over 100 million New Taiwan dollars. As of 13 October, the film had grossed over NT$156 million at the Taiwanese box office.

Our Times performed well in Singapore as well, clinching the box office champion in just the second week of its release.

On its first four days at the mainland Chinese box office, the film grossed CN¥110 million. It is the highest-grossing film from Taiwan at the mainland Chinese box office.

=== Critical reception ===
Our Times received lukewarm critical reviews. The South China Morning Post gave Our Times a rating of 3 out of 5 stars. It described the film's plot-line as "excessively saccharine will-they-won’t-they affair" and advised viewers "to simply surrender to the wave of sentimentality". However, it added that the film's "fairy-tale ending might feel hugely cathartic for the already converted". Similarly, the Taipei Times reviewer Ho Yi criticised the film's plot-line, saying that it "become repetitive at times, adding no new meaning to the narrative". However, Yi praised the cast members, in particular Vivan Sung, whom she complimented as "playing her role well with the comic effect without caricaturing her role." Yi also felt that the director has done a fine job with her attention to detail of the era which the film was set in.

In Singapore, The New Paper gave the film a rating of 5 out of 5, describing the film as "an irresistible combination of nostalgia, humour and heartfelt emotions" and praising it for "pack[ing] a punch for capturing the bittersweet feelings of youthful love".

=== Accolades ===
Award	Category	Recipient	Result
52nd Golden Horse Awards (2015)	Best Actress	Vivian Sung	Nominated
52nd Golden Horse Awards (2015)	Best New Director	Frankie Chen	Nominated
52nd Golden Horse Awards (2015)	Best Original Film Song	Xiao Xing-Yun (小幸運) (A Little Happiness)	Nominated

On 20 August 2016, "A Little Happiness" performed by Hebe Tien reached 100 million views on YouTube, making her the first Chinese-language singer with more than 100 million views.
