= Bii (singer) =

Taiwanese singer, songwriter, and actor

- 畢書盡
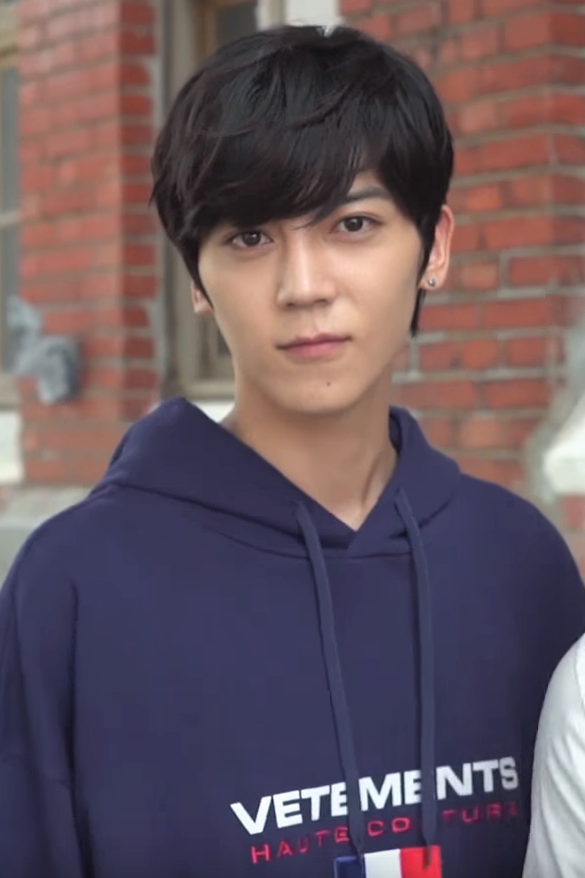
- Born: Pil Seo-jin 필서진; July 7, 1989 (age 36); Seongnam, Gyeonggi Province, South Korea
- Occupations: Singer; songwriter; actor
- Years active: 2010–present
- Musical career
- Genres: Mandopop
- Instruments: Vocals; guitar; piano; drums
- Labels: Linfair Records (2010-2022); JVR Music (2022-present)

Chinese name
- Traditional Chinese: 畢書盡
- Simplified Chinese: 毕书尽
Transcriptions
Standard Mandarin
- Hanyu Pinyin: Bì Shūjìn
Hakka
- Pha̍k-fa-sṳ: Pit Shu-tshìn
Yue: Cantonese
- Jyutping: Bat1 Syu1 Zeon6
Southern Min
- Hokkien POJ: Pit Su-chīn

Korean name
- Hangul: 필서진
- Hanja: 畢書盡
- RR: Pil Seojin
- MR: P'il Sŏjin
- Website: Bii's Official Site

Pil Seo-jin or Bi Shu-jin (Chinese: 畢書盡; Korean: 필서진; born July 7, 1989), known professionally as Bii, is a South Korean-Taiwanese singer, songwriter, and actor.

== Early life ==
Bii was born and raised in South Korea, to a Taiwanese father and Korean mother. At the time of his birth, the South Korean nationality law did not allow South Korean women who were married to foreigners to transmit their nationality to their children, so he was regarded as overseas Chinese in South Korea. He also has a younger brother, Pil Seo-yeong.

His life in South Korea was reported to be a bit challenging as he did not qualify for a national identity card. He could not afford any health insurance and he had to pay higher tuition fees than his Korean peers.

At the age of 17, SM talent agent scouted Bii, who was a high school student then, but his mother rejected the idea of him being a singer.

His native language is Korean. He did not learn Standard Mandarin until he came to Taiwan.

=== Nationality ===
In 2011, Bii acquired his nationality in Taiwan. He took a hiatus from the entertainment industry to serve his mandatory military service in Taiwan between November 2011 and November 2012.

== Career ==
=== Audition ===
Bii was always interested in music. He was the lead singer in his high school band. Later he went to Dongguan, Mainland China to find his father, who worked there, to find a job. Afterwards, a friend of his father's took him to Taiwan and introduced him to the boss of Eagle Music, where Bii started to pursue a musical career.

=== Debut ===
On July 9, 2010, Bii released his first EP which was titled "Bii." This EP contains a total of 4 songs: 1 in Korean and the remaining 3 in Mandarin. On October 6, 2010, Bii released his first album, "Bii Story" which has been sung in both Korean and Mandarin.

=== Stage name ===
The name "Bii" stands for "Be-I-I," indicating his dual personas.

=== Music ===
As a singer and songwriter, he has composed a lot of songs or written the lyrics in Korean and Mandarin. Many of Bii's songs were the theme songs of TV series. His songs have been featured in many TV series, such as Zhong Wu Yan (2010), Love Around, Someone Like You, Bromance, Prince of Wolf, and Better Man in Taiwan.

=== Acting ===
Bii made a cameo appearance in the TV series Love Around (2013) as Peter. He appeared in Episode 1 of the TV series Someone Like You (2015) as Gu Long, who raced against Fang Zan Cheng played by Kingone Wang. He appeared as Wei Qingyang in a romance comedy, Bromance (2015), co-starring with Baron Chen, Megan Lai, Sean Lee, and Katie Chen.

== Discography ==
=== EP ===
EP information	Tracks
Bii (EP): Released: July 9, 2010	Track listing: 1. Bii My Love; 2. What Can I Do; 3. Lost (Chinese version); 4. Stay (Korean version)
Love More (EP): Released: July 23, 2015	Track listing: 1. Love More; 2. B-A-B-Y (Korean version only)

=== Album ===
Album information	Tracks
Bii Story (album): Released: October 6, 2010	Track listing: 1. After Turning Away; 2. Bye Bye Bye; 3. Day by Day; 4. Cannot Reach Happiness/That Cannot Be Happy; 5. Lost; 6. Baby I Love You; 7. Bellucia; 8. The Song Written For You; 9. Bii My Love; 10. After Turning Away (Korean version); 11. Bye Bye Bye (Korean version); 12. You Leave Me (Korean version); 13. Stay (Korean version); 14. What Can I Do (Korean version)
Come Back To Bii (album): Released: May 16, 2013	Track listing: 1. Come back to Me; 2. Feel Good; 3. Flying Meteor; 4. Nothing To Do With Happiness/Nothing But Happiness; 5. Unstoppable Life; 6. I Will BE By Your Side (feat. Miu Chu); 7. Softly; 8. I Know; 9. Goodbye Goodbye; 10. The Love You Gave Me; 11. Come back to Me (Korean version); 12. Unstoppable (feat. Andrew Tan)
Action Bii (album): Released: Dec 19, 2014	Track listing: 1. Action Go!; 2. By My Side; 3. I Wanna Say; 4. Baby Don't; 5. I'm Still Missing You; 6. We Are Walking in Love; 7. Break Me Down; 8. My Love For You Won't Change; 9. Find the Way; 10. Black and White
I'm Bii to the Double I (album): Released: June 6, 2016	Track listing: 1. Catch Your Double Eye; 2. Funky Boy; 3. 38; 4. I Will Miss You; 5. Love Magic; 6. Tender Love; 7. All You Did; 8. Maybe Baby; 9. Sweet Little Baby; 10. Endless Forget
Bii Your Light (album): Released: August 9, 2017	Track listing: 1. You're gone 2. Nothing at all 3. Be your Light; 4. My Girl; 5. Dan; 6. Red n'Hot; 7. Let's Drunk; 8. Ai Ni Jiu Gou Le; 9. Thing of You; 10. Zai Ni De Shi Jie

=== Soundtrack ===
Year	Album	Song title	Notes
2007	My Lucky Star OST	Looking At Each Other (Korean version)	
2010	Zhong Wu Yen OST	"Lost", insertion	
	Zhong Wu Yen OST	"Day by Day", insertion	
	Zhong Wu Yen OST	"Bye Bye Bye", insertion	
	Zhong Wu Yen OST	"After Turning Away", ending	
	Zhong Wu Yen OST	"Cannot Reach Happiness/That Cannot Be Happy", opening	
2012	What Is Love ? OST	"You Give Me Love", insert song	
2013	The King 2 Hearts OST	"Flying Meteor", opening	
2013	Love Around OST	"Come Back To Me", opening	
	Love Around OST	"Nothing To Do With Happiness/Nothing But Happiness", ending	
	Love Around OST	"I Know", insertion	
	Love Around OST	"I Will Be By Your Side", insertion	With Miu
2015	Someone Like You OST	"I'm Still Missing You", opening	
	Someone Like You OST	"Baby Don't", insertion	
	Someone Like You OST	"Break Me Down", insertion	
	Someone Like You OST	"We Are Walking in Love", insertion	
	Someone Like You OST	"My Love For You Won't Change", insertion	
2015	Love Cuisine OST	"Love More", insertion	
2015	Bromance OST	"Epochal Times", opening	With Andrew Tan, Ian Chen, and Dino Lee
	Bromance OST	"Back in Time", insertion	
	Bromance OST	"Tender Love", insertion	
2016	Princess Jieyou OST	"Aurora", ending	Bii
2016	Prince of Wolf OST	"I Will Miss You"	
	Prince of Wolf OST	"Sweet Little Baby"	
	Prince of Wolf OST	"Love Magic", opening	
	Prince of Wolf OST	"Funky Boy"	
2016	Better Man OST	"38", insertion	
	Better Man OST	" All You Did", ending	
	Better Man OST	"Maybe Baby", insertion	
2017	Memory Love OST	"You're Gone"	
	Memory Love OST	"Nothing at all"	
2018	Sweet Combat OST	"A Fearless Tomorrow", OPENING	
2022	49 Days With a Merman OST	"Be Alright", ENDING	
	49 Days With a Merman OST	"Love Now"	

== Filmography ==
=== Television series ===
Year	Network	English title	Role
2010	TTV / SETTV	Zhong Wu Yen	Street Performer
2013	TTV	Love Around	Peter
2015	TTV / SETTV	Someone Like You	Gu Long
2015	TTV / SETTV	Bromance	Wei Qingyang

=== Television shows ===
Year	Network	Title	Role
2018	ViuTV	Goodnight Show - King Maker	Judge (EP39-45)

=== Film ===
- 2016 Trolls, Branch (character voice in Taiwan's Mandarin version)
- 2018 About Youth (有一种喜欢), 饰演崔修男
