= Weber Yang =

Taiwanese actor

- Born: Taipei County, Taiwan (now New Taipei City, Taiwan)
- Occupation: Actor
- Years active: 2000-present

Chinese name
- Traditional Chinese: 楊家丞
Transcriptions
Standard Mandarin
- Hanyu Pinyin: Yáng Jiāchéng
Southern Min
- Hokkien POJ: Iûⁿ Ka-sêng
- Musical career
- Also known as: Yang I-chan; Yang Yizhan; Yang Chun-hung (楊俊宏); Leroy Yang

Weber Yang (Chinese: 楊家丞; Pe̍h-ōe-jī: Iûⁿ Ka-sêng) is a Taiwanese actor. He is known for his roles in the television series Time Story (2008), Who's The One (2011), Two Fathers (2013), The Way We Were (2014) and A Touch of Green (2015). Upon completion of filming A Touch of Green, Yang took a year-long break from acting to spend more time with his parents and to take care of his older sister, who was diagnosed with cancer in that year. He returned to the screen in 2017, starring in the SET Metro drama series The Masked Lover.

== Filmography ==
=== Television series ===
Year	English title	Mandarin title	Role	Network	Notes
2000	Spicy Teacher	麻辣鮮師	Yang Chan (Jungle)	CTS	
2002	Online Hero	天下無雙	Chia-cheng	CTV	Cameo
2003	Original Scent of Summer	原味的夏天	Wakeboarding man	CTV	Cameo
2004	Love Overcomes Everything	死了都要愛	Benson	CTV	
2005	Coming Lies	偷天換日	Tuan Yun-hao	Formosa TV; EBC	
2006	Merry Me	我們結婚吧	Kao Shou	CTS	
2006	Angel Lover	天使情人	Chan-ge	Star Chinese Channel	Cameo
2007	Wayward Kenting	我在墾丁*天氣晴	Ice-cream vendor	PTS	Cameo
2007	Wings of Angel	天使之翼	Chao Yun-hsiang	CTS	
2007	Sweet Relationship	美味關係	Flyer distributor	CTS; GTV	Cameo
2007	Queen's	至尊玻璃鞋	General manager secretary	CTS; GTV	Cameo
2007	Mask	面具	Liang Yu-ting	Formosa TV	
2008	Time Story	光陰的故事	Tao Fu-pang	CTV	
2009	Xing Fu De Qi Dian	幸福的起點	Huang Kuo-lun	Da Ai TV	
2009	The Year of Happiness and Love	那一年的幸福時光	Lin Ying-chieh	TTV; SET Metro	
2009	Happy Together	青梅竹馬	Chang Kai-chu	CTV	alternative title: 4 Friends
2011	Who's The One	我的完美男人	Yen Tieh-nan	TTV	
2012	Love Forward	向前走向愛走	Shao Jen-wei	TTV; SET Metro	
2012	Love in the Wind	你是春風我是雨	Hsieh Li-ta	GTV Variety Show	
2013	Two Fathers	兩個爸爸	Tang Hsiang-hsi	SET Metro; EBC	
2014	Teacher Gangstar	神仙·老師·狗	Meng Hsiao-hu	TTV; NTV Variety; Much TV	
2014	The Way We Were	16個夏天	Fang Wei-te	PTS; TVBS	alternative title: 16 Summers
2015	A Touch of Green	一把青	Chiang Wei-cheng	PTS	
2017	The Masked Lover	我的愛情不平凡	Ku Le-chun	SET Metro	
2017	The Perfect Match	極品絕配	Ku Le-chun	SET Metro	Cameo
2019	C.L.I.F. 5	警徽天职之海岸卫队	Lu Jia Ming	Mediacorp Channel 8	
2025	The Outlaw Doctor	化外之醫	Liu Tien-cheng	Public Television Service	

=== Music video ===
Year	Artist	Song title
1999	Gigi Leung	"Far From the Horizon"
2005	Kelly Chen	"Two Worlds"
2009	Penny Tai	"Forgive Me For Being The Girl I Am"

=== Films ===
Year	English title	Mandarin title	Role	Notes
2026	To Be Ordinary	麻 有用的人		

== Published works ==
- Yang, Weber (2009). Welcome to Guam Mr. Yang. Taipei: Kadokawa Taiwan Corporation. ISBN 9789862371763.

== Awards and nominations ==
Year	Award	Category	Nominated work	Result
2015	50th Golden Bell Awards	Best Actor	The Way We Were	Nominated
