= Ian Chen (musician) =

Taiwanese singer, songwriter and actor

- 陳彥允
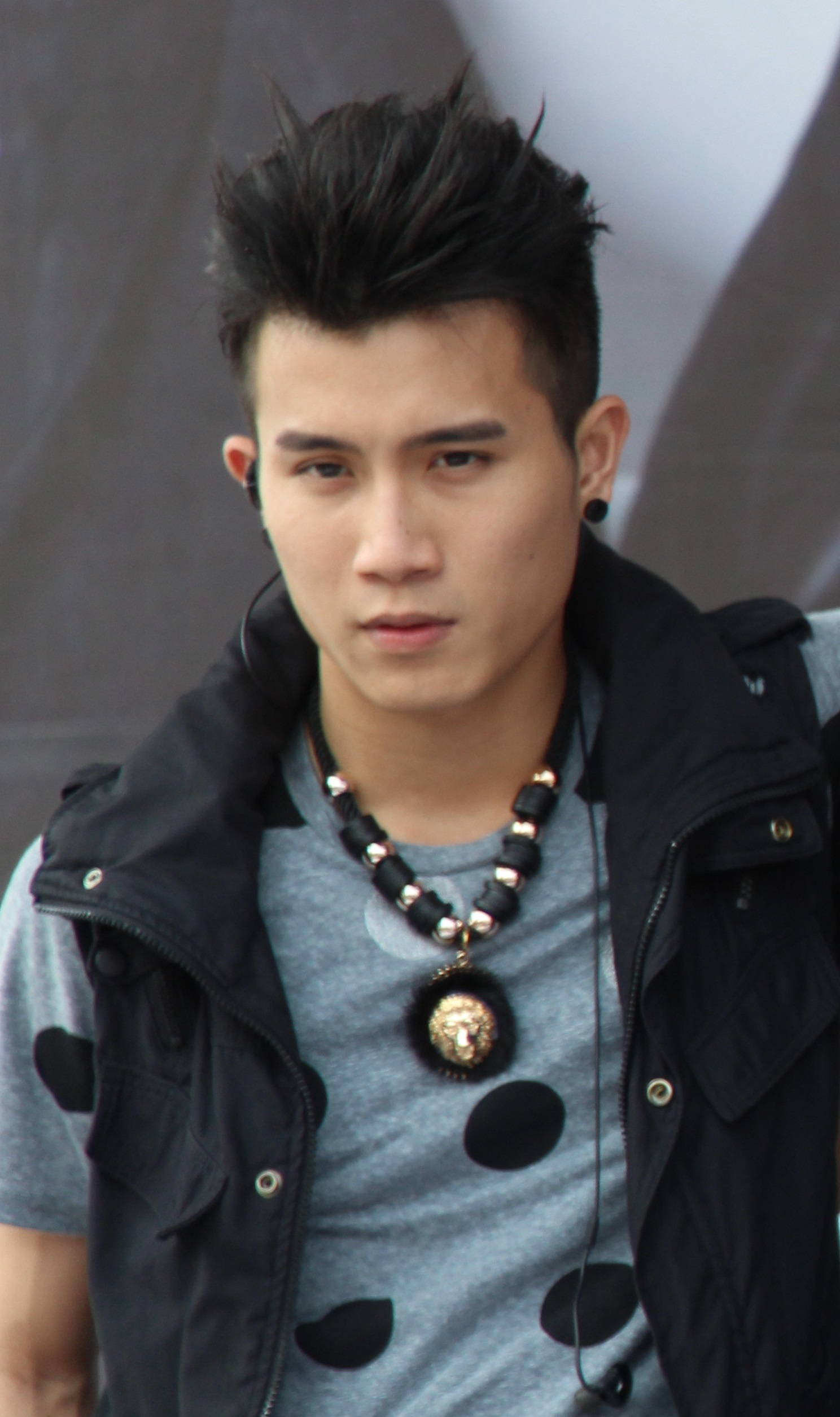
- Born: 4 February 1991 (age 35); Nantou County, Taiwan
- Education: Hwa Kang Arts School
- Occupations: Singer, songwriter, actor
- Years active: 2009–present

Chinese name
- Traditional Chinese: 陳彥允
Transcriptions
Standard Mandarin
- Hanyu Pinyin: Chén Yànyǔn
Hakka
- Pha̍k-fa-sṳ: Chhîn Nyèn-yún / Chhîn Ngàn-yún
Yue: Cantonese
- Jyutping: Can4 Jin6 Wan5
Southern Min
- Hokkien POJ: Tân Gān-ín / Tân Gān-ún
- Musical career
- Also known as: Chen Yen-yun; Chen Yan-yun
- Instruments: Vocals, guitar, violin
- Labels: Linfair Records; Eagle Music

Ian Chen (Chinese: 陳彥允; pinyin: Chén Yànyǔn; Jyutping: Can4 Jin6 Wan5; Pe̍h-ōe-jī: Tân Gān-ín / Tân Gān-ún; Pha̍k-fa-sṳ: Chhîn Nyèn-yún / Chhîn Ngàn-yún; born 4 February 1991) is a Taiwanese singer, songwriter and actor. He first came into public viewas a contestant on the fifth season of the television talent show, One Million Star, where his charm and vocal talent began to attract attention. He released his first album, Ian! Vol.01, on 30 May 2014.

== Discography ==
=== Studio albums ===
Title	Album details	Track listing
Ian! Vol.01 允文允舞	Released: 30 May 2014; Label: Linfair Records, Eagle Music; Formats: CD, digital download	Track listing: 1. Everything Changes (with Dino Lee, Andrew Tan and Bii); 2. 狼與羊; 3. 基因決定我愛你; 4. 小人物大公主; 5. 我們再一起好嗎; 6. First Love; 7. 幸福夜未眠; 8. 小壞蛋; 9. 故事最初; 10. 鎖 11. Revolution
Music Paradise 極樂世界	Released: 21 April 2017; Label: Linfair Records, Eagle Music; Formats: CD, digital download	Track listing: 1. I’m Burning; 2. I Love You, I Do; 3. Money Back Me Home; 4. Chicken Cake 城門城門雞蛋糕; 5. Dream Lover 夢中情人; 6. Don't Play; 7. Adventure Novel 冒險小說; 8. Dark Green 墨綠色; 9. Lonely Planet 寂寞星球; 10. Can't Stop Loving You

=== Singles ===
Title	Album details	Track listing
Somewhere Without You 陌生的地方	Released: 31 July 2015; Label: Linfair Records, Eagle Music; Formats: CD, digital download	Track listing: 1. 陌生的地方; 2. 大皇帝

=== Compilation albums ===
Title	Album details	Track listing
Unstoppable 2-Everything Changes 勢在必行2	Released: 28 March 2014; Label: Linfair Records, Eagle Music; Formats: CD, digital download	Track listing: 1. Revolution
Unstoppable 3-Epochal Times 勢在必行3	Released: 4 September 2015; Label: Linfair Records, Eagle Music; Formats: CD, digital download	Track listing: 1. Epochal Times 心時代 (with Dino Lee, Andrew Tan and Bii); 2. I'm Still Here 等一個人到老; 3. Somewhere Without You 陌生的地方; 4. Emperor of the Legend 大皇帝

=== Soundtrack albums ===
Title	Album details	Track listing
What Is Love (Original TV Soundtrack) 花是愛 電視原聲帶	Released: 10 August 2012; Label: Linfair Records, Passion Music, Eagle Music; Formats: CD, digital download	Track listing: 1. Shall We Be Together Again? 我們再一起好嗎; 2. Shall We Be Together Again? (Karaoke version)
Ladies and Boys (Original TV Soundtrack) 淑女澀男 電視原聲帶	Released: 2 July 2015; Label: Shanghai Tan Xuan Music; Formats: CD, digital download	Track listing: 1. 白日夢

== Filmography ==
=== Film ===
Year	English title	Mandarin title	Role	Notes
2012	Cha Cha for Twins	寶米恰恰	Student A	Cameo
2015	Our Times	我的少女時代	Chou Nien-yu (Sakuragi)	
2017	Who Killed Cock Robin	目擊者	Liao Tzu-fan	

=== Television series ===
Year	English title	Mandarin title	Role	Network	Notes
2014	Pleasantly Surprised	喜歡·一個人	Hsiang Yu	SET Metro; EBC	Alternative title: Love Myself or You / Love Met Cupid; Cameo
2016	Stand by Me	在一起，就好	Chang Ting-fang	TVBS Entertainment Channel	

=== Music video ===
Year	Artist	Song title
2014	Miu Chu	"Run"

== Awards and nominations ==
Year	Award	Category	Nominated work	Result
2015	10th KKBox Music Awards	Best New Artist	—N/a	Won
2015	Hito Music Awards	Best Male Singer-Songwriter	—N/a	Won
