= Dino Lee =

Taiwanese singer, composer, musician and actor

Lee Yu-hsi
- 李玉璽
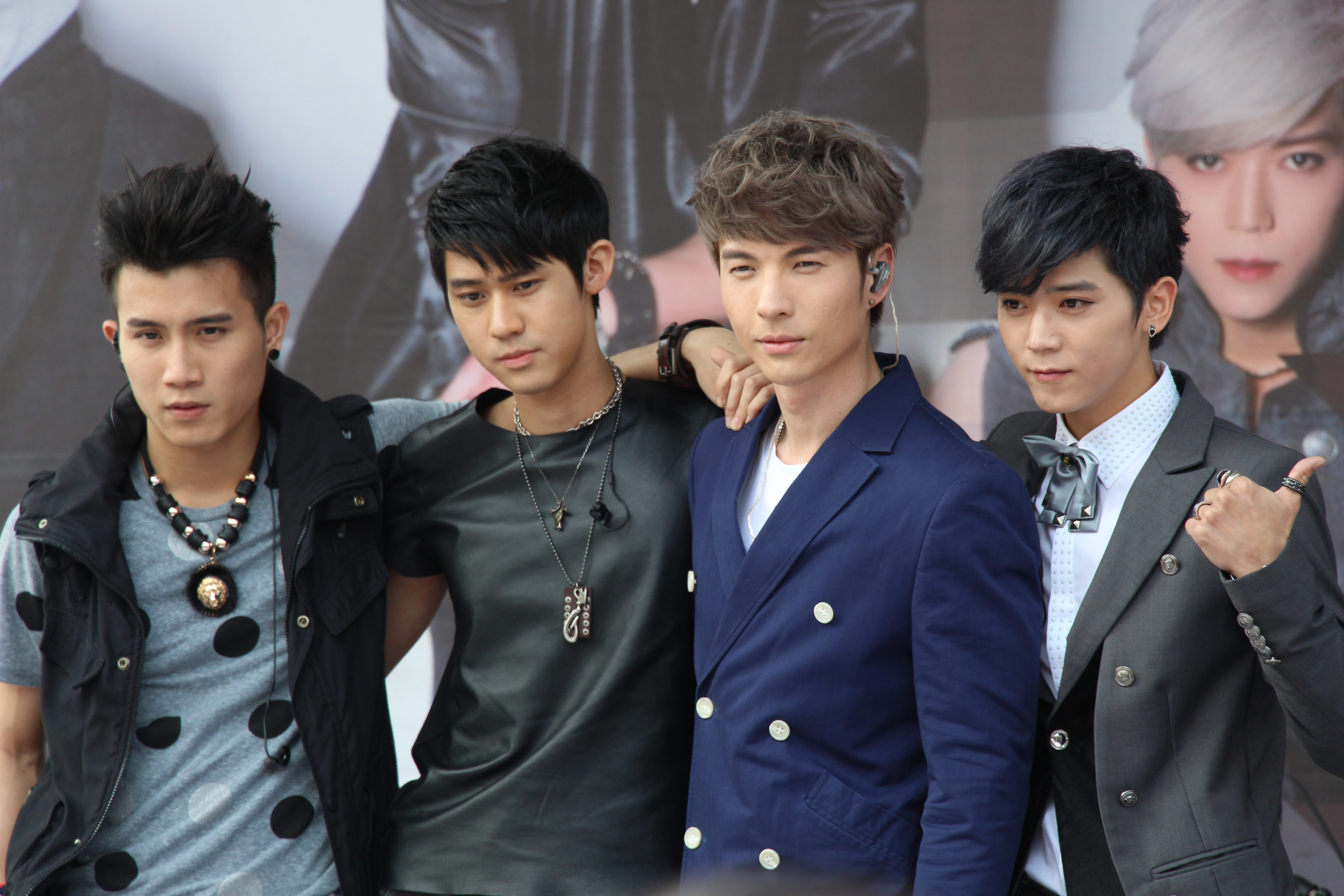
- Dino Lee (second from the left) pictured with fellow band members.
- Born: Lee Yu-hsi; 31 March 1993 (age 33)
- Occupations: Singer, actor, composer, and musician
- Years active: 2014–present
- Musical career
- Also known as: Dino Lee, Lee Yuk-Sai
- Origin: Taiwan

Dino Lee (born Lee Yu-hsi (Chinese: 李玉璽; Pe̍h-ōe-jī: Lí Gio̍k-sú) on 31 March 1993), also known as Lee Yuk-Sai, is a Taiwanese singer, composer, musician and actor. He is known for his role as Ouyang Feifan in the 2015 film Our Times.

== Social Media ==
Dino Lee on Instagram

Dino Lee's channel on YouTube

== Filmography ==
=== Television series ===
Year	Original Title	English Title	Role	Network	Notes
2016	滾石愛情故事	Rock Records in Love	Li Xiaoqing	PTS	Main Role;
2016–2017	惡作劇之吻	Miss in Kiss	Jiang Zhishu	LINE TV	Main Role;
2019	外貌至上主义	Lookism	Gu Qiguang	Tencent	Main Role;

=== Movies ===
Year	Original Title	English Title	Role	Notes
2015	我的少女時代	Our Times	Ouyang "Extraordinary" Fei Fan	Main Role;
2018	有一種喜歡	About Youth	Li Shi Jun	Main Role
2019	一吻定情	Fall in Love at First Kiss		Support Role

== Discography ==
Year	Album	Original Title	English Title	Notes
2015	Bromance OST	心時代	Epochal Times	opening song; with Andrew Tan, Bii, Ian Chen
2016	Prince Of Wolf OST	玩具熊	Toy Bear	insert song
2016	Prince Of Wolf OST		Goodbye my lover	insert song
2016	Prince Of Wolf OST	滿天星	Stars in the Sky	ending song
2016	Miss In Kiss OST	討厭喜歡你	Hate That I Love You	opening song; with Esther Wu
2016	Miss In Kiss OST		Good morning	insert song & preview song
2016	Miss In Kiss OST		Goodbye my lover	insert song
2016	Miss In Kiss OST	惡作劇之后	After A Joke	ending song
