= List of Taiwanese films of the 2010s =

This is a list of films produced in Taiwan ordered by year of release. For an alphabetical list of Taiwanese films see Category:Taiwanese films

== 2010 ==
Title	Director	Cast	Genre	Notes
Monga	Doze Niu	Ethan Juan, Mark Chao	drama	Screened at the 2010 Berlin International Film Festival
Au Revoir Taipei	Arvin Chen	Jack Yao, Amber Kuo, Joseph Chang, Lawrence Ko, Frankie Kao	romance/comedy	Won the NETPAC Prize at the 2010 Berlin International Film Festival
Taipei Exchanges	Hsiao Ya-chuan	Gwei Lun-mei	drama/comedy	Executive produced by Hou Hsiao-hsien
One Day	Hou Chi-jan	Hsin-Ying Hsieh, Shu-Hao Chang	drama	Executive produced by Hou Hsiao-hsien, Screened at the 2010 Berlin International Film Festival
In Case of Love	Gavin Lin	Tony Yang, Bi-Ting Kuo	drama	
Seven Days In Heaven	Essay Liu, Yu-ling Wang		drama/comedy	Based on a novel by the director Essay Liu herself
Pinoy Sunday	Ho Wi-ding	Epy Quizon, Bayani Agbayani, Lu Yi-ching	drama/comedy	
fantôme, où es-tu?	Wang Shau-di	Blue Lan	drama	
R U There	David Verbeek			With Dutch production, Screened at the 2010 Cannes Film Festival
When Love Comes	Chang Tso-chi		drama	Screened at the Pusan International Film Festival, won the Best Film at the Golden Horse Awards
Juliets	Hou Chi-jan, Shen Ko-Shang, Chen Yu-hsun	Vivian Hsu, Edison Wang, Huang He, Lee Chien-na, Kan Kan, Vincent Liang	drama/comedy	

== 2011 ==
Title	Director	Cast	Genre	Notes
Seediq Bale (Warriors of the Rainbow: Seediq Bale)	Wei Te-sheng	Da Ching, Lin Qing-Tai, Umin Boya, Masanobu Andō, Landy Wen, Vivian Hsu	drama/action/historical epic	Entered into the 2011 Venice Film Festival
Night Market Hero	Yeh Tien-lun	Blue Lan, Alice Ko	Comedy	
You Are the Apple of My Eye	Giddens Ko	Ko Chen-Tung, Michelle Chen	Romance, Comedy	
Starry Starry Night	Tom Lin Shu-yu	Xu Jiao, Lin Hui-min	Romance, Fantasy	A China-Taiwan co-production
Jump Ashin!	Yu-Hsien Lin	Eddie Peng, Lin Chen-Shi	Drama	

== 2012 ==
Title	Director	Cast	Genre	Notes
Black & White Episode I: The Dawn of Assault	Tsai Yueh-hsun	Mark Chao, Huang Bo, Angelababy	Action thriller	
Bang Bang Formosa	Andy Luo	Tammy Chen, Peng Chia-chia, Yuan Xinyu, Kong Jiu, Serena Fang	Comedy	
Joyful Reunion	Tsao Juiyuan	Huo Siyan, Lan Zhenglong, Kenneth Tsang, Kuei Yalei	Romance, Comedy	A China-Taiwan co-production
Legend of the T-Dog	Tien-chueh Lee	Wang Po-chieh, Novia Lin	Romance, Comedy	Taiwanese-Japanese co-production
Perfect Two	Kevin Chu	Vic Zhou, Ella Chen, Xiao Xiaobin	Romance, Comedy	A China-Taiwan co-production
Girlfriend, Boyfriend	Gillies Ya-che Yang	Bryan Shu-Hao Chang, Hsiao-chuan Chang, Gwei Lun-Mei, Rhydian Vaughan	Drama	
Cha Cha for Twins	Yang Yi-chien, Jim Wang	Huang Peijia	Comedy	
Touch of the Light	Chang Jung-Chi	Sandrine Pinna, Huang Yu-Siang, Lee Lieh	Drama	
The Ghost Tales	Tso Shih-chiang	River Huang, Lorene Ren, Lee Yi-chieh, Wu Pong-fong, Tsai Chen-nan, James Wen	Horror	
When a Wolf Falls in Love with a Sheep	Hou Chi-jan	Ko Chen-tung, Jian Man-shu, Tsai Chen-nan	Drama	

== 2013 ==
Title	Director	Cast	Genre	Notes
The Rooftop	Jay Chou	Jay Chou, Xu Fan, Eric Tsang, Alan Ko, Wang Xueqi	Comedy	A China-Taiwan co-production
Zone Pro Site	Chen Yu-hsun	Tony Yang, Hsia Yu-chiao, Lin Mei-hsiu, Wu Nien-jen	Comedy	
Will You Still Love Me Tomorrow?	Arvin Chen	Richie Ren, Mavis Fan, Stone	Romantic Comedy	2013 Berlin International Film Festival, 2013 Tribeca Film Festival Narrative Competition
Stray Dogs	Tsai Ming-liang	Lee Kang-sheng	Drama	Won the Grand Jury Prize at the 2013 Venice Film Festival
Marry Me Ting	Johnny Shao	Yang Liang-yu, Hsieh Ming-chuan, Kuan Yun-loong, Yen Yung-heng, Ginger Chen, Chin Tzu-yen, Cheng Jen-shuo	Drama	Screened at the 2013 London Film Festival

== 2014 ==
Title	Director	Cast	Genre	Notes
Café. Waiting. Love	Chiang Chin-lin		Romantic comedy	
Endless Nights in Aurora	Lee Szu-yuan	Rainie Yang, Chris Wang, Kimi Hsia	Romantic drama	
The Frogville			Animated children's film	
My Geeky Nerdy Buddies	Kevin Chu		Romantic comedy	
(Sex) Appeal	Wang Wei-ming	Vivian Hsu, Amber Kuo, Alyssa Chia	Youth romance drama	
Zombie Fight Club	Joe Chen	Andy On, Terence Yin, Philip Ng, Jessica Cambensy	Action	
Dream Flight	Khan Lee	Ray Chang, Wei-Ning Hsu, Tsung-Hua To	Drama, Romance	
Paradise in Service	Doze Niu	Ethan Juan, Wan Qian, Chen Jianbin, Ivy Chen, Wang Po-chieh	Drama, History, Romance	
Partners in Crime	Chang Jung-chi	Wu Chien-ho, Frankie Huang, Deng Yu-kai, Cheng Kai-yuan, Ko Chia-yen, Wen Chen-ling	Crime film	

== 2015 ==
Title	Director	Cast	Genre	Notes
One Night in Taipei	Wilson Chin	Kelvin Kwan, Sharon Hsu, One Two Three, Luk Wing-kuen, Ili Cheng, Mandy Tao, Riva Chang, Sophia Wang, Barbie Liu, King Kong Lee, Yako Chan	Blue comedy	A Hong Kong-Taiwan co-production
Our Times	Frankie Chen	Vivian Sung, Darren Wang, Dino Lee, Dewi Chien, Ian Chen	Romance	
Murmur of the Hearts	Sylvia Chang	Joseph Chang, Isabella Leong, Lawrence Ko, Angelica Lee	Drama	A Hong Kong-Taiwan co-production Screened at the 2015 Hong Kong International Film Festival
When Geek Meets Serial Killer	Zheng Jiang-he, Remus Kam	Bryant Chang, Shiga Lin, JC Chee	Comedy-drama	
The Tag-Along	Cheng Wei-hao	River Huang, Hsu Wei-ning	Horror / Thriller	Highest grossing locally produced and financed Taiwanese horror of all time
Zinnia Flower	Tom Lin Shu-yu	Karena Lam, Stone	Drama	20th Busan International Film Festival – A Window on Asian Cinema
The Laundryman	Lee Chung	Joseph Chang, Wan Qian, Sonia Sui, Yeo Yann Yann	Black comedy	68th Locarno Festival – Piazza Grande section
The Bride	Lingo Hsieh	Wu Kang-ren, Nikki Hsieh, Vera Yen, Chie Tanaka	Horror / Ghost	Taiwanese-Japanese co-production

== 2016 ==
Title	Director	Cast	Genre	Notes
Forêt Debussy	Kuo Cheng-chui	Gwei Lun-mei, Lu Yi-ching	Drama	
Ode to Time	Hou Chi-jan	Parangalan	Documentary	

== 2017 ==
Title	Director	Cast	Genre	Notes
The Mad King of Taipei	Nelson Yeh	Yao Yao, Li Li-ren, Yang Kuei-mei	Drama	
52Hz, I Love You	Wei Te-sheng	Lin Zhong-yu, Van Fan, Nana Lee, Sandrine Pinna, Shino Lin	Musical	
The Village of No Return	Chen Yu-hsun	Shu Qi, Joseph Chang, Tony Yang, Eric Tsang	Comedy drama	
Hanky Panky	Huang Chao-liang	Chu Ke-liang, Lan Cheng-lung, Yang Kuei-mei, Kenji Wu	Comedy	
The Gangster's Daughter	Chen Mei-juin	Jack Kao, Ally Chiu, Alan Ko	Drama	
Leehom Wang's Open Fire 3D Concert Film	Homeboy Music Inc.	Wang Leehom	Concert film	Screened at 2016 Toronto International Film Festival
White Ant	Chu Hsien-che	Chris Wu, Aviis Zhong, Yu Tai-yan	Drama	
The Silent Teacher	Maso Chen		Documentary	
Who Killed Cock Robin	Cheng Wei-hao	Kaiser Chuang, Hsu Wei-ning, Ko Chia-yen, Christopher Lee, Mason Lee	Crime	
Small Talk	Huang Hui-chen		Documentary	
A Foley Artist	Wang Wan-jo		Documentary	
The Perfect Girl	Remus Kam	Tia Lee, Ray Chang	Crime	
My Dear Art	Hsu Hao-hsuan		Documentary	
Story of Taipei	Huang Ying-hsiung	Chen Yi-an, Mina Lee	Drama	
For More Sun II	Lee Chia-hua		Documentary	
Didi's Dream	Kevin Tsai	Dee Hsu, Lin Chi-ling, Jin Shijia, Li Zifeng	Comedy	
Mom Thinks I'm Crazy to Marry a Japanese Guy	Akihisa Yachida	Jian Man-shu, Yuta Nakano, Lotus Wang	Romantic comedy	Taiwanese-Japanese co-production
The Receptionist	Jenny Lu	Teresa Daley, Chen Shiang-chyi	Drama	Taiwanese-British co-production
Mon Mon Mon Monsters	Giddens Ko	Deng Yu-kai, Kent Tsai, Eugenie Liu	Horror	
All Because Of Love	Lien Yi-chi	Kent Tsai, Dara Hanfman	Romantic comedy	
The Tag-Along 2	Cheng Wei-hao	Rainie Yang, Hsu Wei-ning, Paicx Yatauyungana, Lung Shao-hua, River Huang	Horror	
The Last Painting	Chen Hung-i	J.C. Lin, Chang Ning	Mystery	Screened at 2017 International Film Festival Rotterdam
Turn Around	Chen Ta-pu	Jay Shih, Kimi Hsia	Drama	

== 2019 ==
Title	Director	Cast	Genre	Notes
Detention	John Hsu	Gingle Wang, Fu Meng-Po, Tseng Ching-hua	Horror	Based on the internationally-acclaimed 2017 video game Detention by Red Candle Games
