= The Arc of Life (TV series) =

2021 Taiwanese television series

- Also known as: Alpha Girlz; The Business They Started
- Traditional Chinese: 她們創業的那些鳥事
- Simplified Chinese: 她们创业的那些鸟事
- Hanyu Pinyin: Tā Men Chuàng Yè De Nèi Xiē Niǎo Shì
- Genre: Drama; Romance
- Based on: Woman's Company (お仕事です!, Oshigoto desu!) by Fumi Saimon
- Written by: Lu Shiyuan
- Directed by: Jerry Feng; Hsu Chaojen
- Starring: Ruby Lin; Ivy Chen; Jian Man-shu; Roy Chiu; JC Lin; Chris Wang
- Country of origin: Taiwan
- Original language: Mandarin
- No. of episodes: 26

Production
- Producers: Ruby Lin; Lai Cong-bi
- Running time: 60 minutes
- Production companies: Comic Productions Co. Gala Television; Bossdom Digiinnovation Co., Ltd.

Original release
- Network: GTV Drama; IQIYI
- Release: 31 January – 25 April 2021

The Arc of Life (traditional Chinese: 她們創業的那些鳥事; simplified Chinese: 她们创业的那些鸟事) is a 2021 Taiwanese television series written by Lu Shih-yuan and directed by Hsu Chao-jen. The series stars Ruby Lin, Ivy Chen, Jian Man-shu, Roy Chiu, and Chris Wang. It premiered on GTV and IQIYI on 31 January 2021.

== Synopsis ==
An inspirational story that revolves around three female entrepreneurs in the age of Female Power, treating each other sincerely.

== Cast ==
=== Main ===
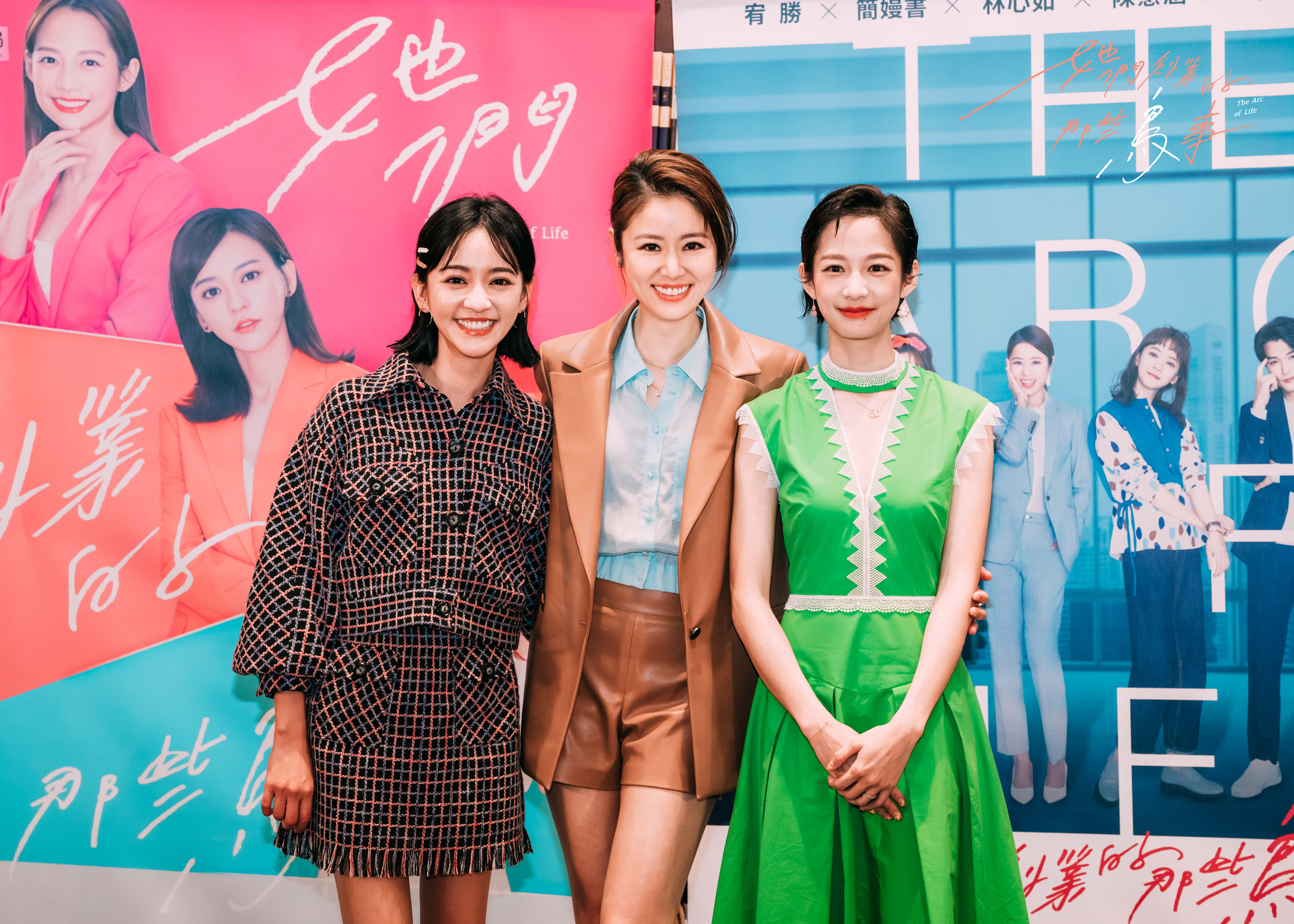
Main cast of Arc of Life

Actor	Drama character	Manga character
Ruby Lin	Gong Ye Xiao Niao (公冶小蔦)	Kotori Nojima
Ivy Chen	Xia Zhi (夏芷)	Natsuko Ota
Jian Man-shu	Lin Mei Ji (林美季)	Miki Kamoshita
Roy Chiu	Zheng Yi Nan (鄭義男)	Shinichiro Nagase
Chris Wang	Yu Long Jie (庾龍玠)	Ryusuke Mitsugi
JC Lin	Lin Chuan Xiang (藺川想)	Yodogawa Hibiki
Alan Ko	Jiang Wushu (江武樹)	Yasunori Mitsugi

=== Supporting ===
- Sara Yu
- Li Kwok-Chiu
- Ha Hsiao-Yuan
- Ma Kuo-Bi
- Jack Kao
- Tou Chung-hua
- Josie Leung
- Bryan Chang
- Matilda Tao
- Chang Han
- Brando Huang
- Lung Shao-hua
- Luo Shih-feng
- Jane Liao

=== Special guests ===
- Lee Li-chun as Xia Yutian (Xia Zhi's father)
- Pauline Lan as Hao Qinglang (Xia Zhi's Mother)

== Soundtrack ==
Type	Title	Singer(s)	Lyricist	Songwriter
Opening Song	"Wú Jiàn Niǎo" (無間鳥, lit. 'Little Bird')	Ian Chen; Bessy Tung	Jerry Feng; Ian Chen	Jam Hsiao, Ian Chen; Hsu Weihung
Ending Song	"Xiǎng A，Xiǎng Zhù Nǐ" (想啊，想著你, lit. 'Thinking About You')	Fang Wu		
Insert Songs	"Over Love"	Sunset Rollercoaster	Tseng Kuo-Hung	
Insert Songs	"Wǒ Hǎo Jì Mò" (我好寂寞, lit. 'I Get Lonely')	A'N'D	Shu Chen	
Insert Songs	"Xiǎng Yào Nì Zài Yì Qǐ" (想要膩在一起)	Tseng Yu-Jia	Jerry Feng	Feifei
Insert Songs	"Guò Qù" (過去, lit. 'The Past')	Sharon Lee	Jerry Feng; Luo Qiao-Bi	Rennie Wang
Insert Songs	"Ai Shàng Nǐ Wǒ Néng Bù Néng Hòu Huǐ" (愛上你我能不能後悔 lit. 'Love Hurts')	Jesslyn	Jerry Feng; Luo Qiao-Bi	Jesslyn
Insert Songs	"Yǐn Xíng De Chì Bǎng" (隱形的翅膀, lit. 'Invisible Wings')	Bessy Tung	王雅君	
Insert Songs	"Ai Rén Cuò Guò" (愛人錯過, lit. 'Somewhere In Time')	Accusefive	Edward Pan Pan Ann	
Insert Songs	"Dài Wǒ Qù Zhǎo Yè Shēng Huó" (帶我去找夜生活, lit. 'Night Life Takes Us to the Light')	Accusefive	Edward Pan Pan Ann	
Insert Songs	"Zài Zhè Zuò Chéng Shì Yí Shī Le Nǐ" (在這座城市遺失了你, lit. 'Where I Lost You')	Accusefive	Edward Pan Pan Ann	
Insert Songs	"Lèi Guāng Shǎn Shǎn" (淚光閃閃, lit. 'Nada Sou Sou')	Hayley Westenra	Ryoko Moriyama	Begin
