= Huang Di-yang =

Taiwanese actor (born 1986)

- 黃迪揚
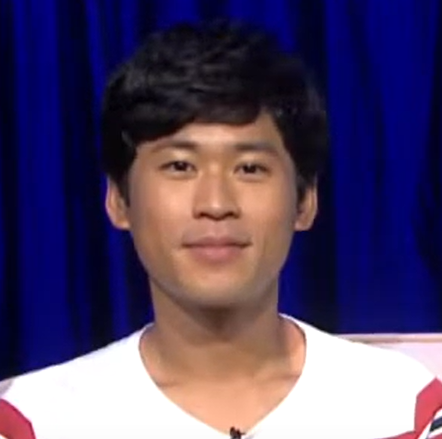
- Huang in August 2014
- Born: Huang Di-yang; 1985 or 1986 (age 40–41); Taiwan
- Education: Taipei National University of the Arts (BA)
- Occupation: Actor
- Years active: 2010–present
- Spouse: Unknown (m. 2017)
- Children: 2

Huang Di-yang (Chinese: 黃迪揚; born 1985/1986) is a Taiwanese actor. He gained prominence for his role as Chen Ya-zheng in the TTV series Close Your Eyes Before It's Dark (2016) and won Best Supporting Actor in a Miniseries or Television Film in the 58th Golden Bell Awards for his performance in the television film To the Sea (2023).

== Early life and education ==
Huang was born in 1985 or 1986 in Taiwan. He grew up in Kaohsiung and developed a passion for comedy during his school years, learning jokes from television programs and sharing them with his female classmates. He joined the drama club in high school and also became interested in acting. He move to Taipei after graduation to attend Taipei National University of the Arts, where he studied alongside fellow actor Shih Ming-shuai, and graduated with a Bachelor of Arts in drama.

== Career ==
After graduation, Huang intended to pursue a career as a comedian, starting by performing at Live Comedy Club Taipei and interning for the political satirical program Celebrity Imitated Show. However, he grew disinterested in comedy and briefly worked in executive production before being encouraged to act by his mentor, Lo Pei-an, who wrote recommendation letters to casting directors on his behalf. Huang landed his first main role in the 2010 soap opera Rice Family, followed by a recurring role in the 2012 romance series PM10-AM03, which he reprised in its second and third seasons. After experiencing ten months without any roles, he was approached by his university senior, Yen Yi-wen, who referred him for a role in the 2014 period drama Lonely River. That same year, he also starred in the war film Dream Flight and in the family drama Happy-Go-Lucky the following year.

In 2016, Huang achieved his breakout role as police detective Chen Ya-zheng in the TTV series Close Your Eyes Before It's Dark, earning public recognition. He starred in the 2017 drama series Top Secret, and appeared in the 2019 television series Yong-Jiu Grocery Store and the second season of the supernatural romance series The Teenage Psychic. That same year, he took on a lead role as Wenxi, a movie-loving drug dealer, in the black comedy film The Gangs, The Oscar, And The Walking Dead. He then appeared in main roles in the 2020 drama series In Your Heart, and as Counselor Wang Wen-de in the 2021 firefighter-themed thriller series Tears on Fire. In 2022, he starred in the television film The Moon in the Cave and in the segment Wishful Syncing of the sci-fi anthology series On Marriage.

In 2023, Huang played a mentally disabled son in the television film To the Sea, which earned him Best Supporting Actor in a Miniseries or Television Film in the 58th Golden Bell Awards. He also secured a recurring role in the crime thriller series Taiwan Crime Stories that same year. The following year, Huang starred in a main role as A-te in the period drama Hotel Saltwater, and is set to appear in a leading role in the Netflix drama series Born for the Spotlight directed and co-written by Yen Yi-wen. He did not land any roles for two years during the COVID-19 pandemic and had to work as a deliveryman to make a living before being cast in Hotel Saltwater.

== Personal life ==
Huang married a percussion music teacher in 2017, and they have two daughters together.

== Filmography ==
=== Film ===
Year	Title	Role	Notes/Ref.
2014	Dream Flight	Uncle (陳伯亞)	
2019	The Gangs, The Oscar, And The Walking Dead	Wenxi (穩死)	
2023	The Pig, the Snake and the Pigeon	Your Holiness' acolyte	
2024	Dead Talents Society	The Chairghost (長官鬼)	
2025	Before the Bright Day	Chen (小陳)	

=== Television ===
Year	Title	Role	Notes/Ref.
2010	Rice Family	Qiu Yi-jie (邱一傑)	Main role
2012–2015	PM10-AM03	Ce Tou (車頭)	Recurring role (season 1–3)
2014	Lonely River	Chiu (邱定榮)	Recurring role
2015	Life List	Coffin seller	Cameo
2015	Happy-Go-Lucky	Ye Chang-le (葉彰烈)	Main role
2016	Close Your Eyes Before It's Dark	Chen Ya-zheng (陳亞正)	Main role
2017	Top Secret	Liu Shih-yuan (劉時元)	Main role
2019	The Making of an Ordinary Woman	Police officer	Cameo
2019	Yong-Jiu Grocery Store	Wu's father	Guest role
2019	The Teenage Psychic	Bai Kuan (白寬)	Guest role (season 2)
2019	HIStory	Teacher	Guest role (season 3)
2020	In Your Heart	Lin Tsung-lung (林宗龍)	Main role
2021	Tears on Fire	Wang Wen-de (王文德)	Main role
2021	Danger Zone	Li Hsiao-ming (李曉明)	Guest role
2022	The Moon in the Cave	Li Ming-hua (李名華)	Main role; television film
2022	On Marriage	Shan (阿山)	Main role (segment: Wishful Syncing)
2023	Taiwan Crime Stories	Qing Ze (青澤)	Recurring role
2023	To the Sea	The Son	Main role; television film
2024	Hotel Saltwater	A-te (阿德)	Main role
2024	Born for the Spotlight	Gecko (壁虎)	Main role
2025	Forget You Not	Wedding host	Cameo

== Awards and nominations ==
Year	Award	Category	Work	Result	Ref.
2023	58th Golden Bell Awards	Best Supporting Actor in a Miniseries or Television Film	To the Sea	Won	
2025	60th Golden Bell Awards	Best Supporting Actor in a Television Series	Born for the Spotlight	Nominated	
