= Year of the Rain =

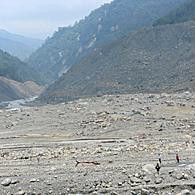
- Xiao-Lin village after Morakot typhoon
- Traditional Chinese: 那年，雨不停國
- Hanyu Pinyin: Nà Nián, Yǔ Bù Tíng Guó
- Genre: TV series
- Created by: Vanness Wu
- Developed by: Yu Bei Hua
- Written by: Xia Kang Zhen; Wu Zhi Yu; Li Yi Fang; Zhao Quan
- Directed by: Chen Wei-ling
- Starring: Jian Man Shu 簡嫚書, Zhang Shu Hao 張書豪, Zhang Jie 張捷, Ke Shu Qin 柯淑勤; Wu Peng Feng 吳朋奉, Xie Qiong Nuan 謝瓊煖, Su Bing Xian 蘇炳憲
- Theme music composer: Su Sheng Yu 蘇聖育
- Opening theme: Yu Mei Ting Guo (雨沒停過) by Soft Lipa (蛋堡)
- Ending theme: A Thousand Wind（千風之歌）by Jimmy Hung (洪天祥)
- Composer: Soft Lipa (蛋堡)
- Country of origin: Republic of China
- Original language: Mandarin
- No. of episodes: 6 episode

Production
- Executive producer: Zhou Yi Quan (周毅銓)
- Producers: Vanness Wu (吳建豪), Jimmy Hung (洪天祥), Tu Bai Feng (涂百鋒)
- Production location: New Taipei City Gongliao District Taiwan
- Cinematography: Chen Guo Long (陳國隆)
- Editor: Wu Zi Ying (吳姿瑩)
- Running time: 50 minutes
- Production company: Public Television Service

Original release
- Network: Public Television Service
- Release: 15 May – 29 May 2010

Related
- Autumn's Concerto

Year of the Rain (Chinese: 那年，雨不停國) is a 2010 Taiwanese television series. The director of the TV series is Chen Wei-ling. It is co-produced by Vanness Wu.

== Introduction ==
Year of the Rain is the first TV series about the Typhoon Morakot disaster that happened in August, 2009 in Taiwan. It was directed by the director of Autumn's Concerto, Chen Wei-ling, and produced by singer/actor Vanness Wu. This was his first production. The main actors are Jian Man Shu and Zhang Shu Hao. It also features Liu Shui-Chi, Isa Hsieh, Yu An-shun and Ding Qiang.

Year of the Rain was created by the production team of Autumn's Concerto. There are 6 episodes.

== Cast ==
=== Main characters ===
| Actors/Actresses | Roles | Introduction |
|---|---|---|
| Jian Man-shu | Lin Yu Jing | Female lead |
| Bryan Chang | Zhang Fu Hai | Male lead |
| Zhang Jie | Zhou Ming Huang | The keyboard player of the band. |
| Ko Shu-chin | Wang Xiao Ling | Lin Yu Jing's mother. She left her when she was young. She came back when Lin Yu Jing lost her father and her grandmother. Lin Yu Jing knew that her mother's life was a mess and she wanted to help her. But Wang Xiao Ling knew that she couldn't give Lin Yu Jing a good life, so she decided to change herself before she met Lin Yu Jing again. |
| Wu Pong-fong | Lin Jian Wen | Lin Yu Jing's uncle. |
| Xie Qiong Nuan | Li Xiu Ling | Lin Yu Jing's aunt. |
| Su Bing Xian | Lao Ai | The coach of the band. |

=== Other characters ===
| Actors/Actresses | Roles | Introduction |
|---|---|---|
| Linda Liu | Chen Mei Fang | Zhang Fu Hai's mother. |
| Ding Qiang | Zhang Jia Hong | Zhang Fu Hai's father. |
| Zhang Pei Jie | | Zhang Fu Hai's sister. |
| Wang Man Jiao | Grandma | Lin Yu Jing's grandmother. |
| Yu An-shun | Liu Zheng Fa | Wang Xiao Ling's boyfriend. |
| Wang Nian Yu | Lin Jian Hong | Lin Yu Jing's father. |
| Lin Jun Yong | Chen Ying Jun | The leader of the band. |

== Awards and nominations ==
=== Awards ===
2010: 45th Golden Bell Awards:

- Drama program guide (director) Award - Chen Wei-ling
- Channel Advertising Award

=== Nominations ===
2010: 45th Golden Bell Awards:

- Drama program Award
- Best Actress Award for drama programs – Jian Man Shu
- Drama program for best supporting actress – Ke Shu Qin
- Drama programs Screenplay Award

== Other ==
=== OST ===
1. Open (Soundtrack)
2. Rush Memory (Soundtrack)
3. Father's song -Piano solo (Soundtrack)
4. Leaving (Soundtrack)
5. Yu Mei Ting Guo (Theme Song)
6. Hao Xiang
7. Oh Love
8. A Thousand Wind

=== DVD ===
1. Name: Year of the Rain 3 DVD+ CD
2. Issuing Company: Public Television Service
3. Date: 2010/08/13
4. Category: Video
5. Total disc: 4
- Information About The Videos
1. Running Time: 531 minutes
2. Director: Chen Wei-ling
3. Main Characters: Jian Man Shu, Zhang Shu Hao, Zhang Jie, Ke Shu Qin, Wu Peng Feng, Xie Qiong Nuan, Su Bing Xian
4. Capacities: 2 discs of DVD5, 1 disc of DVD9, 1 CD
5. Subtitles: Chinese
6. Audio: Dolby 5.1

=== Songs ===
1. Title
2. Open
3. Rush Memory
4. Dropping Silence
5. Father's Song (Quartets version)
6. Water Girl
7. Little Stars (Big Band version)
8. Conflict
9. Father's Song (Piano Solo)
10. Mother
11. Mother and Girl
12. Memory
13. Pray
14. Encounter
15. Leaving
16. Fruit Store
17. Father's Song (Sax and Strings)
18. Father's Song (Big Band)
19. A Thousand Winds (Big Band)
20. Coda

=== Film Locations ===
- Datong High School, Taipei
- Sihjiaoting Station
- Wai-ao Station
- 228 Peace Memorial Park
- Lighthouse San-Diao-Jiao
- Siaolin, Kaohsiung
- Country Road 102 zh:縣道102號
- KHS, Fu-Xing Store
- The Yuanshan Veterans Hospital
- The Gongliao old bridge
- Gongliao Old Street
- Yonghe Sijhou market
- Ximending
