= Chen Wei-ling =

Chen Wei-ling may refer to:

- Chen Wei-ling (actress) (Chinese: 陳維齡; born 1975), Taiwanese actress
- Chen Wei-ling (director) (Chinese: 陳慧翎; 1975–2023), Taiwanese film and television director
- Chen Wei-ling (weightlifter) (Chinese: 陳葦綾; born 1982), Taiwanese weightlifter
