= Hou Chi-jan =

Taiwanese director and writer

Hou Chi-jan (Chinese: 侯季然) is a Taiwanese director and writer. His works are often related to historical memories.

== Education ==
Hou studied print and film at Shih Hsin School of Journalism (now Shih Hsin University). He graduated from National Chengchi University with degrees in radio and television.

== Career ==
In 2003, Hou's first short film Stardust 15749001 received first prize at Taipei Film Festival.

In 2004, he collaborated with Hou Hsiao-hsien’s Sanshi Multimedia Company to film the Taipei Discovery Museum’s “Environmental Theater”: City Life and City Imagination. Combining story, documentary, and computer animation, it is the first multimedia, surround, theater movie in Taiwan.

In 2005, My 747, a short film about his scrapped motorcycle, was selected by 22 international film festivals such as Busan International Film Festival. It won the Asian New Force Award in Hong Kong's IFVA Independent Short Film Competition and the Austrian Sidewalk Cinema Jury Prize. His documentary Taiwan Black Movies was also selected by various international film festivals such as Tokyo and Rotterdam, and was nominated for the Golden Horse Award for Best Documentary.

In 2007, Hou used funding from the Government Information Office to film the short film Shopping Cart Boy, which was selected for the Taipei Film Festival as well as the 2007 Golden Horse International Film Festival. He worked with Chunghwa Telecom Foundation for a series of short films about the cultural and creative industries and communities throughout Taiwan, called Click • Taiwan. He also collaborated with Rock Records to produce a series of documentaries History of Taiwanese Pop Industry on Public Television Service.

In 2008, he participated in the "Hands Project" of Ang Lee and Khan Lee, and directed the three-part film Upper, which was selected as the official finalist for the 2008 Hong Kong Asian Film Investment Association (HAF). He won the first prize at the Taipei International Poetry Festival with the short film Let the Scene Migrate.

In 2009, his script for When a Wolf Falls in Love with a Sheep won the gold medal in the first screenwriting competition of the Taipei Film Commission.

In 2010, his first feature film One Day was nominated for the Berlin International Film Festival Young Directors Award. The film was produced by Hou Hsiao-hsien with actors Bryan Chang and Nikki Hsieh, and chief editor Liao Qingsong. One Day was nominated at the Golden Horse Awards for "Best Original Screenplay" and "Best New Director". It won the Best Screenplay Award at the Beijing Chinese New Directors Forum. Hou directed the music videos for Taiwanese aboriginal singer Yonlon's songs "Farewell" and "A Sunlight Avenue". He also directed the music video for singer Gelresai Chen's "Try it on if you like it", which featured Nikki Hsieh. His short film "Damn Juliet" of Juliet was nominated for the short film competition of Busan Film Festival and Dubai Film Festival.

In 2011, he directed the music video for singer Claire Kuo's "Thinking of Her When You're with Me". He participated in the 2011 Golden Horse International Film Festival's opening anthology 10+10 with the short film Nocturne.

In 2012, Hou's second feature film When a Wolf Falls in Love with a Sheep was released, starring Kai Ko and Jian Man-shu. It was selected as the opening film for the Hong Kong Asian Film Festival.

In 2013, When a Wolf Falls in Love with a Sheep was nominated for the Asian Film Awards "Best Newcomer" (Jian Man-shu) and "Best Visual Effects". It won the Taipei Film Award "Best Overall Technology Award", which included awards for all technical teams including photography, art, modeling, music, sound effects and special effects. It won the Best Director Award at the Montreal World Film Festival in Canada. It was also nominated for the Golden Horse Awards for "Best Art Design" and "Best Visual Effects". That same year, Hou directed the music videos for singer Dadado Huang's "Rainy Evening" and "Diana".

In 2014, the documentary film Poetries From the Bookstores was filmed in 40 independent bookstores in Taiwan. He directed Thriller for Taipei Factory II, which was selected for special screening at the Venice Film Festival. He directed singer Jolin Tsai's "We're All Different" music video, starring Bryan Chang, Gua Ah-leh, and Ruby Lin. It was nominated at the Golden Melody Awards for "Best Music Video".

In 2015, his short film Thriller won the first prize at the Taiwan International Queer Film Festival. He directed Rose Boy, a documentary about Yeh Yonzhen. Poetries From the Bookstores won the Jury prize at the Guam International Film Festival.

In 2016, the second season of Poetries From the Bookstores was filmed. He directed the documentary Forty Years, which was about the Taiwanese folk song movement in the 1970s. It was nominated for the "Asian Future" competition at the Tokyo International Film Festival.

== Books ==
- You are in the future now (太少的備忘錄) (2012)
