= Estella Huang =

Taiwanese writer and film critic

黃以曦
- Estella Huang
- Born: Changhua County, Taiwan
- Education: National Taiwan University
- Occupation(s): Writer, film critic

Estella Huang (Chinese: 黃以曦) is a Taiwanese writer and film critic.

== Biography ==
Estella Huang was born in Changhua County, Taiwan. She originally studied science at National Taiwan University but switched her major to sociology and graduated in 2000. She studied for a master's degree at the Graduate Institute of Building and Planning of National Taiwan University but did not complete it. She became interested in films after attending the 2000 Golden Horse Film Festival. She started writing reviews in 2001 and she was invited by Liberty Times chief entertainment editor Lan Tzu-wei to contribute a film review column every weekend in March of that year, alongside Ting Huang and Chen Yi-chen. She currently writes reviews for Mirror Media. In 2005, she was selected for Berlinale Talents program of the 55th Berlin International Film Festival. In 2013, she published a collection of film reviews called Leaving Seat: Why Watch a Movie? (離席: 為什麼看電影?). In 2018, she authored the novel The Enigmatic Scene (謎樣場景). Writer Huang Yang-chuan of Openbook said that the book as intellectually challenging and innovative with deep philosophical insights, while Zhan Zheng-de of Initium Media called it "a strange book". In 2020, she co-wrote the essay collection Ulysses' Dog (尤里西斯的狗) with poet Sun Te-chin.

== Bibliography ==
- Leaving Seat: Why Watch a Movie? (離席: 為什麼看電影?, 2013) ISBN 978-9-86-584200-0
- The Enigmatic Scene (謎樣場景, 2018) ISBN 978-9-86-927813-3
- Ulysses' Dog (尤里西斯的狗, 2020) ISBN 978-9-86-979511-1
