= Cindy Chi =

Taiwanese actress

- 紀欣伶
- Born: 6 October 2001 (age 24); Taipei, Taiwan
- Occupation: Actress

Chinese name
- Traditional Chinese: 紀欣伶
- Simplified Chinese: 纪欣伶
Transcriptions
Standard Mandarin
- Hanyu Pinyin: Jì Xīnlíng

Cindy Chi or Chi Hsin-ling (Chinese: 紀欣伶; pinyin: Jì Xīnlíng) is a Taiwanese actress.She has participated in many TV series and music videos. In 2026, she is currently a member of the girl group W!nky, alongside with her older sister, Betty Chi (紀欣妤) , known as Ariel (艾莉兒), a member of the Taiwanese girl group A'N'D .。

== Filmography ==
=== Film ===
Year	English title	Original title	Role	Notes
2008	Good Will Evil	兇魅	Tien	
2017	Turn Around	老師你會不會回來	Class monitress	

=== Television series ===
Year	English title	Original title	Role	Notes
2010	Down with Love	就想賴著妳	Xiang Yu-fei	
2010	The Love River	藍海1加1	Ho Chen-ai	
2012	Sunshine After The Rain	陽光總在風雨後	Chen I-chun	
2015	For Better or For Worse	大大與太太	Chen Li-hsiu	
2018	On Children	你的孩子不是你的孩子	Chung Kuo-ning	
2019	HIStory3: Make Our Days Count	HIStory3：那一天	Liu Mei-fang	
2021	HIStory4: Close To You	HIStory4：近距離愛上你	Liu Mei-fang	
2023	Go Fighting	機智職場生活	Chi Hsin-ling	
2024	A Wonderful Journey	華麗計程車行	Rose	
2025	Exclusive Love	獨佔接班人	Chou Yu-ning	
