= Autumn's Concerto =

2009 Taiwanese television series

- Promotional poster
- Also known as: 下一站，幸福; Xia Yi Zhan, Xing Fu
- Genre: Romance, Drama
- Directed by: Chen Wei-ling
- Starring: Ady An; Vanness Wu; Ann Hsu
- Opening theme: "我愛他" (I Love Him) by Della Ding
- Ending theme: "突然想愛你" (Suddenly Want To Love You) by Della Ding and Wakin Chau
- Country of origin: Taiwan
- Original languages: Mandarin; Taiwanese (Note: A substantial amount of Taiwanese is spoken in the village, while Mandarin is spoken mostly in the Taipei scenes.)
- No. of episodes: 21 (original release); 34 (Netflix release)

Production
- Running time: 60 mins (Sundays at 22:00)
- Production company: Sanlih E-Television (SET)

Original release
- Network: Taiwan Television (TTV)
- Release: 4 October 2009 – 28 February 2010

Autumn's Concerto (Chinese: 下一站，幸福; pinyin: Xià Yí Zhàn, Xìngfú; lit. 'Next Stop', 'Happiness') is a 2009 Taiwanese drama series starring Ady An, Ann Hsu, and Vanness Wu of F4. It was produced by Sanlih E-Television and directed by Chen Wei-ling. The series was filmed from June to December 2009.

The series was first broadcast in Taiwan on free-to-air Taiwan Television (TTV) on Sundays from 22:00 to 23:30 from October 4, 2009, to February 28, 2010. It was also shown on the cable network Sanlih E-Television on Saturdays from 21:00 to 22:30 from October 10, 2009, to March 6, 2010.

Autumn's Concerto was nominated in 2010 for Best Marketing at the 45th Golden Bell Awards in Taiwan. The show has also broken records with its high ratings. Episode 18 (aired on 31 January 2010) achieved a score of 8.23, passing The Prince Who Turns into a Frog to become the second-highest rated Taiwanese idol drama, second only to Fated to Love You. Autumn's Concerto aired on Hawaii's KIKU television every Saturday at 7:00 pm.

== Synopsis ==
Ren Guang Xi (Vanness Wu) is a law student whose mother is the dean of his college. He had a difficult childhood and takes out his anger on the world by bullying others and taking advantage of his mother's position. Liang Mu Cheng (Ady An) also had a rough past, but still strives to protect her stepmother from learning that her mother's boyfriend sexually harasses her; Liang applies to college to escape this abuse.

Guang Xi and Mu Cheng meet over a dispute about a car. Guang Xi believes that Mu Cheng is manipulative, and he swears to make her show her true colors. Guang Xi then makes a bet with his friends that he can get Mu Cheng to kiss him within 24 hours. He asks Mu Cheng out, and her stepmother forces Mu Cheng to go on the date since she fears that Guang Xi can shut down the school canteen, which she co-owns. Mu Cheng has her own problems with the date since Guang Xi had threatened to have her best friend, Hua Tuo Ye (Chris Wu), expelled from the school because he gave Mu Cheng a book from the school library.

Guang Xi wins his bet, and Mu Cheng goes home to her stepmother, who encourages Mu Cheng to sell her body. She also mocks Mu Cheng's desire to play the piano again. Mu Cheng rushes out of the house in anger and runs to the college. She finds a piano there and plays Air on the G String by Bach. Guang Xi, asleep in the room, hears her and is reminded of his father, who committed suicide years before. He forces Mu Cheng to stop and accuses her yet again of being manipulative. He then attempts to make Mu Cheng strip, but stops when she starts to cry.

Guang Xi asks her to play the piano for him every night. Mu Cheng's stepfather learns about the arrangement and takes advantage of it. When Guang Xi is away, he goes into the music room and attempts to rape Mu Cheng, but is caught by Mu Cheng's stepmother and Guang Xi. Mu Cheng's stepfather tries to blame it on Mu Cheng, but Guang Xi knows that he is lying and the school gets involved. Because there is no evidence to prove Mu Cheng's innocence, a Truth Investigation Court is held at the school to find justice. Guang Xi represents Mu Cheng as her lawyer. Tuo Ye finds evidence and presents it to the court, which helps to win the case.

Problems arise when Guang Xi's mother does not approve of her son's relationship with Mu Cheng, and forces an arranged relationship between Guang Xi and He Yi Qian (Ann Hsu). Guang Xi later finds out that he has a brain tumor that has been affecting his behavior. At this point, the chances of his survival are very low unless he undergoes a new surgical procedure pioneered by He Yi Qian's father. However, in order to have the operation, he has to leave Mu Cheng and marry Yi Qian. He refuses, but Mu Cheng finds out and, wanting Guang Xi to have the life-saving operation, she leaves him, finding out later that she is pregnant with his son.

Six years pass by and Mu Cheng lives a quiet life with her and Guang Xi's son, Xiao Le. During the operation that saved his life, Guang Xi lost his memory and does not remember Mu Cheng at all. He is now engaged to Yi Qian and has become a successful lawyer. Guang Xi starts to regain his memory after taking on a case where he defends his client from rape charges. After winning the case, he hears his client speaking about the victim offensively and begins to remember what happened with Mu Cheng. Infuriated, he becomes violent with his client and, as a consequence, is sentenced to 240 hours of community service in the same town that Mu Cheng and Xiao Le are living in. He builds a strong bond with Xiao Le, and Mu Cheng is reminded of why she loves him.

After ten days of community service, Guang Xi leaves and returns to his normal life. On his wedding day with Yi Qian, he finds an SD card in his bracelet that had been with him for six years. The card contains photographs of him and Mu Cheng, which cause him to regain all of his memories. After realising that Xiao Le must be his son, and remembering Mu Cheng leaving him, Guang Xi becomes bitter and vengeful, telling Mu Cheng that she must marry him or else he will take away Xiao Le.

While on a trip with Guang Xi, Mu Cheng discovers that Tuo Ye has been accused of killing a gang leader. She and Tuo Ye's mother beg Guang Xi to defend Tuo Ye, and he agrees reluctantly. He finds the real murderer, a girl who was kidnapped by the gang and was abused via unwanted use of drugs. Guang Xi intends to divorce Mu Cheng, as he believes that she is in love with Tuo Ye, but Tuo Ye tells him the truth about why Mu Cheng left him. However, Guang Xi still sends Mu Cheng divorce papers, but their son forces them to reveal their true feelings.

== Cast ==
=== Main cast ===
- Ady An as Liang Mu Cheng, the main female protagonist, a young girl who falls in love with Ren Guang Xi
- Vanness Wu as Ren Guang Xi, a famous and successful lawyer who falls in love with Liang Mu Cheng
- Ann Hsu as He Yi Qian, Guang Xi's fiancée, and a successful pediatrician
- Chris Wu as Hua Tuo Ye, Mu Cheng's best friend
- Xiao Xiao Bin as Xiao Le (or Liang Xiao Le or Ren Xiao Le), Mu Cheng and Guang Xi's son

=== Supporting cast ===
- Zheng You Jie as Xu Fang Guo
- Linda Liu as Fang De Rong
- Renzo Liu as Lawyer Lin
- Tao Chuan Zheng as He Zhen Tang
- Xie Qiong Nuanas Lin Li Xia
- Akio Chen as Zhou Jin Cai
- Alice as Zhang Ai Li
- Jet Chao as A Jian
- Figaro Ceng as Jacko
- Shen Zong Lin as A Nuo
- James Wen as Liang Yun Zhong
- Lin Jian Huan as Guang Xi's father
- Jian Han Zhong as Police
- Harry Zhang as Luo Jia Da
- Fu Lei as Photographer
- Derrick Chang as Gary, Guang Xi's secretary, and assistant
- Yao An Qias Wu Li Hua
- Gu Han Yun as Tao Da Yi
- Chen Yi Xuan as Doctor Chen
- Lin Mei-hsiu as Hua Tian Xi Shi
- Lin Jun Yong as Hua Sheng Bin
- Chen Wei Min as Hua Huo
- Amanda Chu as Hua Ci Xin, a maid adopted by Tuo Fe's mother
- Chang Qing as Hua Ze Lei
- Deng Yun Ting as Tang Tang, a classmate and friend of Xiao Le
- Chen Zi Xian as Hua Hong
- Ssu Jung as Hua Sha Sha
- Hsia Ching Ting as Fang Ge, an infamous triads gang leader
- Melanie Li as kindergarten teacher

== Soundtrack ==
Soundtrack album by Various artists
- Released: 5 February 2010
- Genre: Mandopop
- Language: Mandarin
- Label: B'in

Autumn's Concerto Original Soundtrack (下一站，幸福電視原聲帶) was released on February 5, 2010, by various artists under B'in Music. It contains thirteen songs, seven of which are instrumental versions of other tracks. The album also includes a DVD. The opening theme song is "I Love Him" by Della Ding (Ding Dang (singer)), and the ending theme song is a duet by Della Ding and Wakin Chau entitled "Suddenly Want To Love You."

=== Track listing ===
No.	Title	Lyrics	Music	Singer(s)	Length
1.	"I Love Him" (我愛他 Wo Ai Ta)	Ting Huang	VChuan	Della Ding (Ding Dang (singer))	4:44
2.	"Loved One" (親人)	Chen Mo	Michael Lin	Della Ding	4:53
3.	"I Thought – secret version" (拓也的秘密心願 – 我以為 inst.)			Yen-j (嚴爵)	2:23
4.	"Not Letting Go" (相遇就不放手 inst.)			Yen-J	1:59
5.	"All for Love" (一切為了愛)	Gong Da Hu; Chen Mo	Tony Wen	Victor Wong	3:31
6.	"I Love Him – Next Stop, fortune version" (下一站，幸福 – 我愛他 inst.)			Yen-J	2:29
7.	"I Thought" (我以為)	Ting Huang	Victor Wong	Victor Wong	4:56
8.	"Air On The G String" (G弦之歌 inst.)
9.	"Why Are Lying version" (最美麗的謊言 - 你為什麼說謊)				3:15
10.	"Full of Imagination" (充滿幻想的年少 inst.)		Yen-J	Yen-J	2:01
11.	"Four-Leaf Clover" (幸運草)	Ting Huang	Shen Shengzhe	Della Ding	4:24
12.	"Loved One version" (愛你不要失憶 – 親人 inst.)				3:17
13.	"Suddenly Want To Love You" (突然想愛你)	Francis Lee	Wakin Chau; Nicky Lee; Andrew Chou	Della Ding; Wakin Chau	4:52

DVD
No.	Title	Length
1.	"I Love Him music video" (我愛他 MV)
2.	"Suddenly Want To Love You music video" (突然想愛你 MV)
3.	"Loved One music video" (親人 MV)
4.	"Autumn's Concerto special"

== International release ==
Autumn's Concerto was aired in the Philippines on February 14, 2011 (Valentine's Day) starting Monday to Friday at 4:45 pm on ABS-CBN. The schedule was then changed to Saturday morning starting from 9:50 a.m. to 10:30 a.m. The drama series ended on September 17, 2011 in the Philippines.

The title was changed to I Love You So (Autumn's Concerto), and the characters were changed into English names:

- Liang Mu Cheng to Michelle Liang
- Ren Guang Xi to Stanley Ren
- He Yi Qian to Ingrid He
- Hua Tuo Ye to Toby Hua
- Liang Xiao Le/ Ren Xiao Le to Wacky Liang/ Wacky Ren

In Japan the drama was aired on Japanese cable channel DATV from February 27 to October 16, 2010, for 34 episodes. It was also re-run on cable channel BS NTV from June 2, 2010, to January 26, 2011.

== Books ==
- Next Stop, Happiness: The Novel (an adaptation) (《下一站，幸福》原創小說), written by Liang Wen Ru, published by Kadokawa Media (Taiwan) Co., Ltd. on October 21, 2009. ISBN 978-986-237-358-3
- Next Stop, Happiness – Notes from Planet Dala: The Photobook (《下一站，幸福 達拉星球愛記事》寫真書), produced by Sanlih E-Television, published by Kadokawa Media (Taiwan) Co., Ltd. on December 30, 2009. ISBN 978-986-237-438-2

== Remake ==
The series will be remade in Korean.
