= Close Your Eyes Before It's Dark =

- 天黑請閉眼
- Genre: Thriller; Mystery
- Written by: (Chen Shih-chieh; Wang Ci-Yang; Chan Chun-Chieh
- Directed by: Zhen-Nian Ke; Chen Yu-hsun
- Starring: Bryan Chang; Jian Man-shu; Yen Tsao; Sun Ke-Fang; Allen Chen; Jake Hsu; Chu Sheng-Ping; Blue Lan; Huang Shang-Ho; Huang Di-yang
- Ending theme: "Light of Darkness 黑暗之光" by Ricie Fun
- Country of origin: Taiwan
- Original language: Mandarin
- No. of episodes: 7

Production
- Executive producer: Zhang-Kun
- Producers: Liao Jian-Xing; An Zhe-Yi
- Running time: 110 minutes

Original release
- Network: TTV
- Release: December 30, 2016 – February 17, 2017

Related
- Have You Ever Fallen in Love, Miss Jiang?; House of Toy Bricks

Close Your Eyes Before It's Dark (Chinese: 天黑請閉眼; pinyin: Tiān Hēi Qǐng Bìyǎn) is a 2016 Taiwanese mystery thriller created and produced by TTV. Directed by Ke Zhen-Nian and Chen Yu-hsun, it is the fourth installment in the anthology series Qseries and premiered on December 30, 2016.

The series revolves around eight friends who were classmates and members of the mountain-climbing club from ten years ago and their venture into a mountain to uncover truths from the past. The ensemble and supporting cast include Bryan Chang as Lu Bo-Cang, Jian Man-shu as Jung Xiao-Tong, Yen Tsao as Chou Ruo-Qing, Sun Ke-Fang as Liu Cheng-Fang, Allen Chen as Lan Yi-Cong, Jake Hsu as Li Zi-Shuo, Chu Sheng-Ping as Huang Yu-Xiu, Lan Ya-Yun as Bai Xin-Yi, Huang Shang-Ho as Wang Guang-Wei, and Huang Di-yang as Chen Ya-Zheng. Filming took place primarily in Miaoli, Taiwan.

== Premise ==
The series focuses on eight friends who were members of the mountain-climbing club in high school ten years ago. Due to a photo scandal, most of them have lost contact with one another and a gulf of distrust lies between each of them. In the present, they meet up in a mountain cabin and attempt to dig up time capsules they had buried ten years before, only to find out someone had already dug them. Unbeknownst to them, a darker conspiracy is lurking after them, and finding the truth could lead to deadly consequences.

== Cast ==
- Bryan Chang as Lu Bo-Cang: One of the members of the mountain-climbing club in high school. He is now a surgeon in practice and is married to Cheng-Fang, whom he was in love with since ten years ago.
- Jian Man-shu as Hung Xiao-Tong: One of the members of the mountain-climbing club in high school. She was expelled from high school due to a photo scandal with Yi-Cong, her then-boyfriend. She is now a model.
- Yen Tsao as Chou Ruo-Qing: One of the members of the mountain-climbing club in high school. He actively participates in grassroots movements.
- Sun Ke-Fang as Liu Cheng-Fang: One of the members of the mountain-climbing club in high school. She was a close friend of Xiao-Tong and is now married to Bo-Cang.
- Allen Chen as Lan Yi-Cong: One of the members of the mountain-climbing club in high school. Son of a wealthy businessman and was Xiao-Tong's boyfriend. After the photo scandal, he was able to stay in school due to his father's status, yet his girlfriend was expelled.
- Jake Hsu as Li Zi-Shuo: The mountain-climbing club leader in high school. He has a secret that he hid for ten years.
- Chu Sheng-Ping as Huang Yu-Xiu: One of the members of the mountain-climbing club in high school. She has a naive personality.
- Lan Ya-Yun as Bai Xin-Yi: One of the members of the mountain-climbing club in high school. She was the trigger for the photo scandal ten years ago and was determined to find the perpetrator. She is now a prosecutor and has asthma. She is also the organizer for the mountain trip.
- Huang Shang-Ho as Wang Guang-Wei: Son of the mountain cabin owner.
- Huang Di-yang as Chen Ya-Zheng: A policeman. He is also Xin-Yi's boyfriend.

== Soundtrack ==
- Ending theme: "Light of Darkness 黑暗之光" by Ricie Fun

== Episode ratings ==
Air date	Episode	Average ratings
December 30, 2016	1	0.47
January 6, 2017	2	0.60
January 13, 2017	3	0.61
January 20, 2017	4	0.58
February 3, 2017	5	0.87
February 10, 2017	6	0.96
February 17, 2017	7	1.24
Average ratings		0.76

== Awards and nominations ==
Year	Award	Category	Nominee(s)	Result
2017	52nd Golden Bell Awards	Best Television Series		Won
2017	52nd Golden Bell Awards	Best Supporting Actor in a Television Series	Huang Shang-Ho	Nominated
2017	52nd Golden Bell Awards	Best Supporting Actress in a Television Series	Sun Ke-Fang	Won
2017	52nd Golden Bell Awards	Best Newcomer in a Television Series	Sun Ke-Fang	Nominated
2017	52nd Golden Bell Awards	Best Director in a Television Series	Ke Zhen-Nian	Nominated
2017	52nd Golden Bell Awards	Best Screenplay in a Television Series	Wang Kong-Cheng, Wang Ci-Yang, Wu Han-Jie, Lin Pin-Jun, Ke Zhen-Nian, Chen Shih-Chieh, Fu Kai-Ling, Chan Jun-Jie	Nominated
2017	52nd Golden Bell Awards	Best Sound Mixing	Luming Lu, Jian Feng-Shu	Won
2018	29th Golden Melody Awards	Best Recording Package - Technical Category	Lu Yi-Xuan (Original TV series soundtrack from "Close Your Eyes Before It's Dark")	Nominated
