= My Goddess =

2018 Taiwanese television series

- Official Poster
- 種菜女神
- Genre: Romance, Comedy
- Created by: iQiyi Taiwan
- Written by: Wu Pei Zhen 吳佩珍; Ke Yan Xin 柯雁心; Lu Pei Yi 呂佩怡
- Directed by: Liao Shi Han 廖士涵
- Starring: Jasper Liu; Annie Chen; Lee Chien-na; Jake Hsu
- Opening theme: Sunburn 曬傷 by Waa Wei
- Ending theme: Far and Gone 遠走 by Kowen Ko
- Country of origin: Republic of China
- Original languages: Mandarin, Taiwanese
- No. of episodes: 24

Production
- Executive producers: Liao Jian Xing 廖健行; Yang Yi Ping 楊以苹
- Producer: Ker Choon Hooi 郭春暉
- Production location: Taiwan
- Production companies: OTT Entertainment 歐銻銻娛樂有限公司; An Ze Pictures 安澤映畫有限公司

Original release
- Network: iQiyi Taiwan; EBC; TTV
- Release: 16 November 2018 – 1 February 2019

Related
- Tree in the River; Without Her, Even Hero Is 0

My Goddess (Chinese: 種菜女神; pinyin: zhǒng cài nǚ shén) is a 2018 Taiwanese television series created and produced by iQiyi Taiwan. It stars Jasper Liu, Annie Chen, Lee Chien-na and Jake Hsu as the main cast. Filming began on 21 February 2018 and wrapped up on 4 July 2018.

== Synopsis ==
Yan Dong Ming used to have a flourishing and well-established career in music, and was widely known for his love songs. However, the public has now completely lost interest in him. Desperately trying extend his music career, he ends up in the isolated Geng Hai Village under strange circumstances and meets the "Planting Goddess" Tian Li Yun. Dong Ming, a neatness freak who has "city cancer"—an obsession with city living—can't get used to the natural habitat of the Geng Hai Village. However, under the guidance of Li Yun, he falls in love not only with the self-sufficient village, but also with the strong and determined Li Yun. When a dangerous crisis threatens the village, Dong Ming faces the choice of standing by Li Yun or abandoning her and returning to the city to regain his long-lost music dream.

== Cast ==
=== Main cast ===
- Jasper Liu as Yan Dong Ming
- Annie Chen as Tian Li Yun
- Lee Chien-na as Ping Zhen Xi
- Jake Hsu as Xu Qiang

=== Supporting cast ===
- Jason Tsou as Ji Zhao Ze
- Jeremy Liu as Mi Kang
- Hsieh Ying-hsuan as Song Qiao En
- Sun Ke Fang as Song Qiao Qi
- Suming Rupi as Ma Yao
- Jane Liao as Chen Yong Zheng
- Tou Chung-hua as Qiu Yuan An

== Soundtrack ==
- "Sunburn 曬傷" by Waa Wei
- "Far and Gone 遠走" by Kowen Ko
- "Your Brave Face 若無其事" by Crispy
- "Tin Bian's Little Song (Dong Ming ver.) 田邊的小情歌 東鳴版" by Jasper Liu
- "Tian Bian's Little Song (Mi Tang ver.) 田邊的小情歌 米唐版" by Zhu You Cheng
- "Cuckoo Song 咕咕歌" by Jasper Liu
- "聽見是你" by Lee Chien-na & Jake Hsu
- "The Last Sentence I Love You (Zhen Xi ver.) 最後的一句我愛你 真希版" by Lee Chien-na
- "The Last Sentence I Love You (Xu Qiang ver.) 最後的一句我愛你 許強版" by Jake Hsu
- "The Beginning 最初" by Sun Ke Fang
- "旅途" by Lee Chien-na
- "Don't Be So Quick to Say You Love Me When You Are in Dulan 別在都蘭的土地上輕易地說著你愛我" by Jasper Liu
- "Don't Want to Leave (Jia Jia ver.) 不想離開 家家版" by Jia Jia
- "Don't Want to Leave (Dong Ming ver.) 不想離開 東鳴版" by Jasper Liu
- "旭" by Jasper Liu
- "發洩歌" by Suming Rupi

== Broadcast ==
Network	Country	Airing Date	Timeslot
iQiyi Taiwan	Taiwan	November 16, 2018	
TTV	Taiwan	November 16, 2018	Friday 9:30-11:30pm (until December 28, 2018)
TTV	Taiwan	November 16, 2018	Friday 10:00 pm–12:00 am (since January 4, 2019)
EBC Variety	Taiwan	November 17, 2018	Saturday 8:00-10:00 pm
iQiyi	China	November 16, 2018	Friday - Sunday 8pm
UNTV	Philippines	This 2021	TBA

- VIP members would get to watch all episodes. Regular members of Iqiyi China version would only get to watch 2 episodes on each day from Friday to Sunday.

== Awards and nominations ==
Year	Ceremony	Category	Nominee	Result
2019	54th Golden Bell Awards	Best Director in a Television Series	Liao Shih Han, Ker Choon Hooi	Nominated
2019	2019 Asian Academy Creative Awards	Best Comedy Performance	Jeremy Liu	Nominated
2019	2019 Asian Academy Creative Awards	Best Theme Song or Title Theme	“Goddess Be Happy!” by Suming Rupi	Nominated
