= Jake Hsu =

Taiwanese actor

- 徐鈞浩
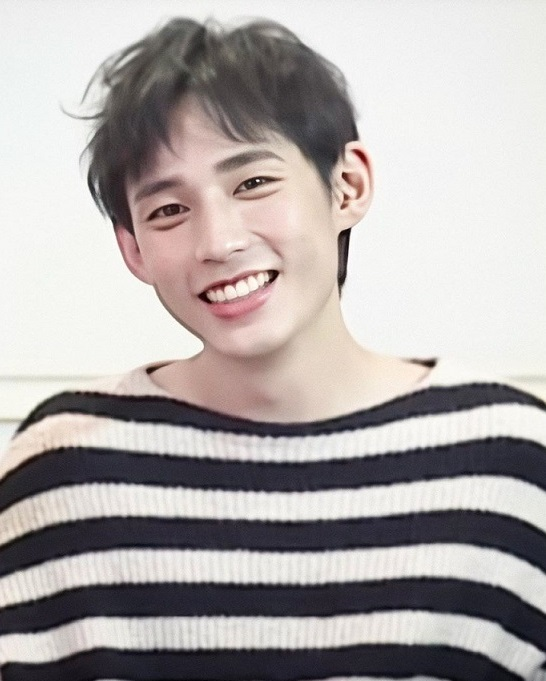
- Jake in May 2019
- Born: December 30, 1990 (age 34); Taoyuan, Taiwan
- Education: National Taiwan University of Arts (BFA)
- Occupation: Actor
- Years active: 2016–present
- Agent(s): Happy Together Entertainment (2018 - Current)

Chinese name
- Traditional Chinese: 徐鈞浩
- Simplified Chinese: 徐钧浩
Transcriptions
Standard Mandarin
- Hanyu Pinyin: Xú Jūnhào
- Wade–Giles: Hsü Chün-Hao
Southern Min
- Hokkien POJ: Chhî Kun-hō

Jake Hsu (Chinese: 徐鈞浩; pinyin: Xú Jūnhào; Wade–Giles: Hsü Chün-hao; Pe̍h-ōe-jī: Chhî Kun-hō; born December 30, 1990) is a Taiwanese actor.

Hsu is best known for starring in Close Your Eyes Before It's Dark (2016), the fourth installment in the anthology series Qseries, as well as Trapped (2019), the first chapter of the web series HIStory3.

== Early life, education, and personal life ==
Hsu was born on December 30, 1990, in Taoyuan, Taiwan. During high school, he was the president of the magic club and was able to solve Rubik Cube in 30 seconds. Because of colleagues' reactions to his performances, he fell in love with performing arts, and despite his parents' and teachers' opposition he decided to study art. He attended and graduated from National Taiwan University of Arts, earning a bachelor's degree in drama. During this time, he engaged in many school productions and theatrical performances.

Hsu can play Guitar and Piano and is known for being a huge movie fan, watching ten to fifteen movies every week, actively going to film festivals, and correctly predicting many of the Oscars award winners. Hsu is also known for his support of gender equality, environmental causes and had a lifeguard license.

== Career ==
=== 2015–2016: Acting debut ===
In 2015, Hsu made a cameo appearance in the drama Youth Power as Ah Bao, playing a student from a wealthy family.

Also in 2015, Hsu auditioned for Q Place, a project founded by eight award-winning directors and designed for cultivating new actors and actresses. Out of approximately four hundred contestants, Hsu came to be one of the twenty-four actors and actresses that qualified for the subsequent actor training class and the opportunity to be cast in installments of the anthology series Qseries.

In 2016, Hsu starred as a supporting character Heng Li in Love of Sandstorm, the first installment in Qseries, and a non-credited character Xiao Kuo in Life Plan A and B, the following installment in Qseries that also stars Rainie Yang. Hsu's lead role Li Zi-shuo in Close Your Eyes Before It's Dark as a homosexual who holds unrequited affection for his close friend gained him recognition and popularity among fans.

=== 2017–present: Rising popularity ===
In 2017, Hsu was cast as a lead role Xu Xiao-fan in 1000 Walls in Dream, playing the brother who suffers from a bipolar disorder of protagonist Xu Xiao-qing (Christina Mok).

In 2018, Hsu starred as a supporting cast Wu Cheng-han in Age of Rebellion, a high school dropout with artistic talents. During the same year, Hsu also played the lead role as a blind man Xu Qiang in My Goddess, who is able to move people with his singing, alongside Jasper Liu, Annie Chen, and Nana Lee.

In 2019, Hsu was cast as Meng Shao-fei in Trapped, the first installment in the third season of HIStory. He plays a police officer intent on uncovering the truth behind the death of his superior while developing romantic affection for the gang leader Tang Yi (Chris Wu). Trapped was a hit both domestically and internationally, and Hsu was able to attract fans worldwide. At the 56th Golden Horse Awards Ceremony, Hsu served as a Golden Horse Awards ambassador along with Wang Ko-yuan and PinEr Chen.

In 2020, Hsu challenged hosting his own show on the Radio Broadcasting Platform "Wave" and starred in his agency's self-produced online reality show Action Together along with his label mates Fu Meng-po, Nick Yang and OuYang Lun. He also starred as Chen Shun-he in Zihuatanejo, a marine biologist along with Patty Lee. Before filming for the drama he obtained OWD diving certificate and later also obtained AOWD certificate.

== Filmography ==
=== Feature film ===
Year	English title	Original title	Role	Notes
2018	Back to the Good Times	花甲大人轉男孩	Policeman	Cameo
2019	The Paradise	樂園	Wang Zhong-yi	Cameo
2021	Waiting for My Cup of Tea	一杯熱奶茶的等待	Huang Zi-yang	
2023	Lost in Perfection	恶女	Xu Xiang	

=== Series ===
Year	English title	Original title	Role	Notes
2015	Youth Power	哇！陳怡君	Ah Bao	Cameo
2016	Love of Sandstorm	戀愛沙塵暴	Heng Li	
2016	Life Plan A and B	荼蘼	Kuo	Cameo
2016	Close Your Eyes Before It's Dark	天黑請閉眼	Li Zi-shuo	
2017	1000 Walls in Dream	夢裡的一千道牆	Xu Xiao-fan	
2018	Age of Rebellion	翻牆的記憶	Wu Cheng-han	
2018	My Goddess	種菜女神	Xu Qiang	
2019	HIStory3: Trapped	圈套	Meng Shao-fei	
2020	Zihuatanejo	記憶浮島	Chen Shun-he	
2020	Magic Moment	粉紅色時光	He Hao-dong [Young]	Cameo
2021	Trinity of Shadows	第三佈局 塵沙惑	Hu Ta Tung [Young]	
2022	White Book	白書	Jian Shi Shuo	
2022	Shards of Her	她和她的她	Lin Zhen Ye	
2024	Trade War	商魂	San Lang	
2024	Urban Horror	都市懼集	Ahong	
2024	You are My Sister	妳是我的姐妹	Shao Yan Wen	
2024	Born for the Spotlight	影后	Wang Dao	
2025	Forget You Not	忘了我記得	ER doctor	Cameo
2025	A Table For One (Is Great Too) 2	就算一個人也可以好好的吃飯2	Hongdou Ni	
2025	Had I Not Seen The Sun	如果我不曾見過太陽		

=== Short film ===
Year	English title	Original title	Role
2013	Love is Equal	平等的愛	Himself
2014	Mark of Youth	青春的刻印	Himself
2014	Silya	Silya	Yang Zhi-yuan
2015	Lonely Age of Seventeen	寂寞的十七歲	Wei Bo-yang
2016	Milk Pot	牛奶鍋	Interviewee/Director Debut
2016	Patriotic Lottery	愛國獎券	Himself
2017	Tomato	番茄	Liu
2017	Bong Joon-ho's Okja Part 1、Part 2	奉俊昊《玉子》	Himself
2017	Daihachi Yoshida's The Kirishima Thing Part 1、Part 2	吉田大八《聽說桐島退社了 》	Himself
2018	Dog Mask	狗罩	Chen
2018	Oppression	冬陽	Hsia Yuan-wei
2018	Goodnight, My Dear	晚安時間	Zhen Nan
2019	The Other Side	無塵之地	Li Kun-jie
2022	A New Apartment	新居	Liang
2024	Till Next Time	翌日	

=== Music video appearances ===
Year	Song title	Original title	Singer	Album	Link
2011	If, However	如果或可是	Ji Xin-pei	Life	Video on YouTube
2014	Best Lover	最好的情人	Four Friends	Four Friends	Video on YouTube
2019	Lonely Lonely No Good	寂寞寂寞不好	Gary Chaw	Super Junior	Video on YouTube
2019	Sàn Sàn Xīn Hǎo Ma	散散心好嗎	Amanda	CHOICE	Video on YouTube
2019	Hometown	南方北方	Kang Shu Long	Hometown	Video on YouTube
2019	Granted	如願以償	Freya Lim	Granted	Video on YouTube
2020	Dāng Nǐ Jiàn Dào Wǒ	当你见到我	Liu Lian (Mr.Miss)		Video
2020	Box	盒子	Jani Zhang		Video on YouTube
2020	I Remember	你已忘記但我還記得的事	Astro Bunny	Leyou Height	Video on YouTube
2021	White	白色	Ann	白色	Video on YouTube
2021	Sick Love Song	爛情歌	Hue	Hue	Video on YouTube
2022	I Will Be There	愛是我們必經的辛苦	Crispy Band	愛是我們必經的辛苦	Video on YouTube
2022	Sorry X 100	相愛就是說了100次對不起	Crispy Band	愛是我們必經的辛苦	Video on YouTube
2023	Chīxīn wúmíngshì	癡心無名氏	Ivy Lee	Non-album single	Video on YouTube
2023	Sixth Sense	預感	Fish Leong	麋鹿	Video on YouTube

=== Reality Show ===
Year	English title	Role	Network
2020	Action Together	Main Cast	Action Together Youtube Channel

=== Hosting ===
Year	Title	Notes
2021	The 58th Golden Horse Awards Star Avenue	with Yang Qian Pei
2023	The 60th Golden Horse Awards Nominees Luncheon	
2024	The 61st Golden Horse Awards Star Avenue	with Yang Qian Pei and Wang Yu-xuan
2025	The 62nd Golden Horse Awards Star Avenue	with Yang Qian Pei and Peng Cian-you

== Theater ==
=== Stage play ===
Year	Play Title	Original title
2012	Rèliàn	熱戀
2016	Chuāngmíngjījìng	窗明几淨
2022-2023	Felicità Wedding Office	Felicità 婚禮事務所
2025	The Little Prince	小王子

== Discography ==
=== Featured Songs ===
Year	Song title	original title	Details	Link
2018	The Last Sentence I Love You	最後的一句我愛你	My Goddess Drama OST (Xu Qiang version); *Singer(s): Jake Hsu	
2019	Tīngjiàn Shì Nǐ	聽見是你	My Goddess Drama OST; *Singer(s): Nana Lee Feat. Jake Hsu	
2019	Unlike Us	我們不像我們	*Singer(s): Della Feat. Jake Hsu and Chris Wu	Video on YouTube
2019	Meteor Shower	流星雨	*Singer(s): Ezu Huang Feat. Jake Hsu, Chris Wu, Andy Bian and Kenny Chen	Video on YouTube
2020	Action Together Opening	Action Together片頭曲	Action Together Reality Show Opening Song; *Singer(s): Jake Hsu, Fu Meng-po, Nick Yang and OuYang Lun	

== Awards and nominations ==
Year	Award	Category	Nominated work	Result
2015	New Generation Youth Film Festival Creative Awards	Best Actor	Lonely Age of Seventeen	Won
