= Hotel Saltwater =

- 鹽水大飯店
- Genre: Period drama
- Written by: Chen Fang-chi; Cheng Wen-tang
- Directed by: Lin Chih-ju; Cheng Wen-tang
- Starring: Chang Yao-jen; Ellen Wu; Huang Di-yang; Emerson Tsai; Fang Wen-lin; Hsieh Ming-yu; Brando Huang
- Composer: Pei-Chin Lee
- Country of origin: Taiwan
- Original languages: Taiwanese Hokkien, Taiwanese Mandarin
- No. of episodes: 8

Production
- Executive producer: Yeh Chen-hsing
- Producer: Cheng Wen-tang
- Production locations: Kaohsiung, Taiwan
- Editor: Alulu Kuo
- Running time: 60 minutes

Original release
- Network: PTS Taigi
- Release: 3 March – 14 April 2024

Hotel Saltwater (Chinese: 鹽水大飯店) is a 2024 Taiwanese period romance drama series produced by PTS Taigi, directed by Cheng Wen-tang and Lin Chih-ju and starring Chang Yao-jen, Ellen Wu, Huang Di-yang and Emerson Tsai. The series began filming in February 2023 and premiered on 3 March 2024 on PTS Taigi, PTS+ and Netflix.

== Plot ==
The series is set in the late 1970s when Taiwan was under martial law and based on Chen Tseng-chih's 2017 book "Hotel Saltwater: Tai Chen-yao's Revolutionary Youth". The plot is adapted from the youth experiences of agricultural reform activist Tai Chen-yao, depicting the protagonist Lee Wen-chin's participation in the 1979 Kaohsiung Incident during the martial law era in Taiwan. He faces brutal opposition by the Kuomintang government and becomes a political prisoner. The title "Hotel Saltwater" does not refer to a real hotel; rather, it is nickname used by prisoners to joke about the harsh jail conditions, where rice was mixed with salted water as a means of survival.

The series received funding from the Kaohsiung Film Archive as part of the "Kaohsiung Drama" initiative.

== Soundtrack ==
Hotel Saltwater Original Soundtrack was produced by Peipei Music, released digitally on 28 February 2024 and physically on 18 March 2024.

Hotel Saltwater – Original Soundtrack
No.	Title	Length
1.	"Kiô-á-thâu Youth Cooperative"	0:33
2.	"Our Love"	1:34
3.	"The Scissor"	3:59
4.	"Let's Dance"	2:29
5.	"The Invitation"	0:52
6.	"The Last Night of 19"	2:39
7.	"I Can’t Be with You"	2:58
8.	"Beautiful Things"	1:53
9.	"Propose"	2:01
10.	"A-tik's Reminding"	2:06
11.	"Formosa Demonstration"	4:15
12.	"Police Hit Residents"	2:10
13.	"The Escape"	2:20
14.	"All the Worries"	1:53
15.	"Daydreaming"	1:45
16.	"Thanks for All Your Help"	1:14
17.	"The Suffering Stops Here"	5:35
18.	"Lunar New Year"	4:13
19.	"The Last Night of 19 (Lonely Version)"	2:36
20.	"Come Back Home"	2:06
21.	"Joining the Democratic Movement is like Dancing"	4:19

== Awards ==
Year	Awarding Body	Category	Nominee / Work	Result
2024	59th Golden Bell Awards	Best Miniseries	Hotel Saltwater	Nominated
2024	59th Golden Bell Awards	Best Actor in a Miniseries or Television Film	Chang Yao-jen	Nominated
2024	59th Golden Bell Awards	Best Supporting Actor in a Miniseries or Television Film	Huang Di-yang	Nominated
2024	59th Golden Bell Awards	Best Supporting Actress in a Miniseries or Television Film	Fang Wen-lin	Nominated
2024	59th Golden Bell Awards	Best Director in a Miniseries or Television Film	Cheng Wen-tang and Lin Chih-ju	Won
2024	59th Golden Bell Awards	Best Writing for a Miniseries or Television Film	Chen Fang-chi and Cheng Wen-tang	Nominated
2024	59th Golden Bell Awards	Best Original Song for a Drama Series	Sun Shu-mei, Yang Ya-che, and Luantan Ascent – "No Hindrance" (《無罣礙》)	Nominated
2025	2025 Asia Contents Awards & Global OTT Awards	Best Adaptation from an Original Work	Hotel Saltwater	Won
