= One Day (2010 film) =

- Film poster
- Directed by: Hou Chi-jan
- Screenplay by: Hou Chi-jan
- Produced by: Zoë Chun-Jung Chen
- Starring: Bryan Chang; Nikki Hsieh
- Cinematography: Feng Hsin-hua
- Edited by: Liao Ching-sung
- Music by: Han Cheng-ye
- Release date: 4 June 2010
- Running time: 93 minutes
- Country: Taiwan
- Language: Mandarin

One Day (有一天) is a 2010 Taiwanese film directed by Hou Chi-jan.

== Cast ==
- Bryan Chang as Tsung
- Nikki Hsieh as Singing
- Gwen Yao as Mum

== Awards and nominations ==
| Award | Category | Recipients | Result |
|---|---|---|---|
| 47th Golden Horse Awards | Best New Director | Hou Chi-jan | Nominated |
| 47th Golden Horse Awards | Best Original Screenplay | Hou Chi-jan | Nominated |
| Pacific Meridian Festival | Special Jury Award | One Day | Won |
