= HIStory (web series) =

Taiwanese boys' love anthology series

- Title card
- Genre: Boys' love Teen drama
- Created by: Chang Ting-fei
- Written by: Yang Yi-hua; Lin Pei-yu; Shao Hui-ting
- Directed by: Tang Yi; Ishtar Tsai; Adiamond Lee; Li Ching-jung; Nancy Chen
- Country of origin: Taiwan
- Original language: Mandarin
- No. of seasons: 5
- No. of episodes: 108

Production
- Executive producers: Chang Ting-fei; Lin Mu-jung
- Producer: Rex Chang
- Running time: 20 minutes
- Production company: Choco Media → Line TV

Original release
- Network: Choco TV; Line TV
- Release: February 14, 2017 – March 1, 2023

HIStory (pronounced "his story") is a Taiwanese anthology streaming television series created by Chang Ting-fei for Choco TV and Line TV. (Note: The first two seasons of the series are produced and distributed by Choco TV. Choco TV merged into Line TV in November 2018, and Line TV continues to produce the HIStory drama series while also inheriting the rights to the first two series.) Each season presents stand-alone stories with different plots and main characters focusing on the theme of boys' love, also known as BL. The first season premiered on February 14, 2017.

The series has accumulated a large international following and is well-received by critics. HIStory is the first Taiwanese web drama to air on Japanese television, with the first season premiering on Japan's Nippon TV on July 31, 2017. On July 2, 2018, the series had its primetime television debut in Taiwan through CTS, airing the first two seasons back-to-back throughout the month. Its film sequel, Crossover (跨界) was announced on August 17, 2018, but was cancelled due to adjustment of content strategy due to the COVID-19 pandemic, subsequently announcing the fourth season being under works. Season five premiered on December 28, 2022.

== Series overview ==
Season	Episodes	Originally released	
Season	Episodes	First released	Last released
1	12	February 14, 2017	March 3, 2017
2	16	January 30, 2018	March 28, 2018
3	40	April 16, 2019	December 18, 2019
4	20	March 14, 2021	May 30, 2021
5	20	December 28, 2022	March 1, 2023

== HIStory1 ==
The first season of the HIStory series, often referred to as HIStory1 when named along with the other seasons, has a total of three miniseries, namely My Hero, Stay Away From Me and Obsessed, starring Aaron Lai and Chiang Yun-lin, Duke Wu and Edison Song, and Bernard Ho and Teddy Yen as three couples for the three miniseries.

Miniseries	Episode count	First Aired	Last Aired	Director	Screenwriter(s)	Producer
My Hero	4	February 14, 2017	February 17, 2017	Tang Yi	Yang Yi-hua	Rex Chang
Stay Away from Me	4	February 21, 2017	February 24, 2017	Ishtar Tsai	Yang Yi-hua	Rex Chang
Obsessed	4	February 28, 2017	March 3, 2017	Adiamond Lee	Lin Pei-yu	Rex Chang

=== My Hero ===
My Hero is the first miniseries of HIStory1, directed by Tang Yi and starring Aaron Lai, Chiang Yun-lin and Patricia Lin.

Plot

During a mission to collect the soul of college student Gu Si Ren, whose time on earth is dwindling, grim reaper Bai Chang-chang accidentally captures Lan Hsi's soul instead, killing her. To avoid punishment by the gods, Bai Chang-chang tries to find a way to help Lan Shi return to Earth, but her body is cremated, rendering her unable to return to her original body. Lan Shi's soul takes over Gu Si Ren's body in a rage. She uses this opportunity to try to get back with her boyfriend Mai Ying-Shiung (Hero), but she only has seven days for her boyfriend to fall in love with her new body and gain true love's kiss. Otherwise, her soul, and Gu Si Ren, will die.

Cast

- Aaron Lai as Mai Ying-Shiung "Hero", Lan Hsi's boyfriend
- Chiang Yun-lin as Gu Si-Ren, an unlucky lonely boy who has a crush on Hero
- Patricia Lin as Lan Shi, whose soul takes over Gu Si-Ren's body
- Da-her Lin as Bai Chang-Chang, the grim reaper
- Cason Chiang as Ya Chin, Hero and Si-Ren's roommate

=== Stay Away from Me ===
Stay Away from Me (Chinese: 離我遠一點) is the second miniseries of HIStory1, directed by Ishtar Tsai and starring Duke Wu, Edison Song and Chiao Man-ting.

Plot

When their parents get married and leave for a long honeymoon, superstar Cheng Ching moves in with his new stepbrother Feng He. With Cheng Ching on the brink of failing out of college, their parents entrust Feng He to tutor him. Meng Meng, Feng He's fujoshi best friend, starts dreaming of the perfect BL fanfic and tries to push the two together, but will Feng He be able to stay away from his brother?

Cast

- Duke Wu as Cheng Ching, a popular idol who tries to balance work life and school
  - Duke Wu also appears as Cheng Ching in Make Our Days Count of HIStory3 as a nephew of Lu Chih-kang.
- Edison Song as Feng He, Cheng Ching's older step brother and love interest
- Chiao Man-ting as Meng Meng, Feng Ho's best friend who ships Cheng Qing and Feng He together
- Wang Ying-ying as Feng He's mother

=== Obsessed ===
Obsessed (Chinese: 著魔) is the third and final miniseries of HIStory1, directed by Adiamond Lee and starring Bernard Ho, Teddy Jen, Chen Yee.

Plot

Shao Yi-chen, a man who dies in a car accident following a scuffle with his ex-boyfriend Chiang Chin-teng, is reborn and sent back 9 years. To change his future, he avoids Chin-teng and his feelings for him. Yi-chen proceeds to destroy his diary, where he wrote about his longtime crush on Chin-teng. Chin-teng finds a few pages and develops a growing curiosity about Yi-chen which he can't explain. Yi-chen himself realizes that he can't resist Chin-teng, no matter how many times he tries.

Cast

- Bernard Ho as Chiang Chin-teng, a law student who was Shao Yi-chen's lover in his previous life. After discovering a few pages from Yi-chen's diary, he grows curious about him and feigns amnesia to get closer to him
- Teddy Jen as Shao Yi-chen, who is reborn and sent back 9 years. He is determined to start a new life but finds it difficult to avoid Chin-teng, whom he still loves
- Chen Yee as Tsai Yi-chun, Chin-teng's childhood friend who has a crush on him
- Charles Lee as Lei Chung-chun, Chin-teng's childhood friend
- Johnson Chang as Li Mu-bai, Yi-chen's best friend who becomes Chung-chun's lover
- Jerry Wu as Che Kang, Chin-teng's friend
- Wang Ying-ying as Yi-chen's mother

== HIStory2 ==
HIStory2 is the second season of the HIStory series, having a total of two miniseries, namely Right or Wrong and Crossing the Line, starring Steven Chiang and Hunt Chang, Zach Lu and Fandy Fan, and Nick Yang and Patrick Shih as three couples for the two miniseries.

Miniseries	Episode count	First Aired	Last Aired	Director	Screenwriter(s)	Producer
Right or Wrong	8	January 30, 2018	February 21, 2018	Li Ching-jung	Lin Pei-yu	Rex Chang
Crossing the Line	8	March 6, 2018	March 28, 2018	Ishtar Tsai	Lin Pei-yu	Rex Chang

=== Right or Wrong ===
Right or Wrong (Chinese: 是非) is the first miniseries of HIStory2, directed by Li Ching-jung and starring Steven Chiang, Hunt Chang. Right or Wrong accumulated 4.25 million views during its run.

Plot

Shih Yi-jie, an associate professor of the anthropology department, is a divorced father with a 6-year-old daughter. Upon chance, he hires college student Fei Sheng-che ("Xiao Fei") to be his daughter's babysitter. After years of having dysfunctional work hours and inconsistent meals, Xiao Fei's presence at home brings huge changes to Yi-jie's life, and he falls in love. But the family of three's lives gets disrupted when Yi-jie's ex-wife comes back, in hopes to rekindle their failed marriage.

Cast

- Steven Chiang as Shih Yi-jie, 31-year-old associate professor of the anthropology department
- Hunt Chang as Fei Sheng-che ("Xiao Fei"), a 19-year-old college student who is hired by Yi-chieh to be his daughter's babysitter
- Ye Yi-en as Shi Ke-you ("You You"), Yi-jie's 7-year-old daughter
- Shelby Su as Ye Wen-ling ("Ye Zi"), Xiao Fei's close friend
- Lia Kang as Chou Hsin-ju, Yi-jie's ex-wife and Ke-you's mother
- Chu Meng-hsuan as Chou Shao-an, Xiao Fei's classmate and Hsin-ju's younger brother
- Chao Yung-hsin as Auntie Juan, Xiao Fei's mother
- Oscar Chiu as Chiang Chao-peng, Yi-chieh's friend

=== Crossing the Line ===
Crossing the Line (Chinese: 越界) is the second miniseries of HIStory2, directed by Ishtar Tsai and starring Zach Lu, Fandy Fan, Nick Yang and Patrick Shih. Crossing the Line accumulated over 4.56 million views during its run and is the only series in the HIStory anthology to receive a Golden Bell nomination for Best Miniseries.

Plot

New transfer student Hsia Yu-hao joins the Zhihong High School volleyball club and gradually falls in love with the senior student Chiu Tzu-hsuan.

Cast

- Zach Lu as Chiu Tzu-hsuan, a studious and stern 12th grade student at Zhihong High. A former star athlete for the volleyball team, Tzu-hsuan was forced to retire after a serious injury rendered him unable to play. To continue his pursuit in volleyball, he volunteers to be the team's manager, assisting in managing the team's funds and training the players.
- Fandy Fan as Hsia Yu-hao, an 11th grade student. Rebellious but righteous, he was transferred out of his previous high school after getting involved in a fight protecting a younger student. Possessing athletic talent, Yu-hao is talked into joining Zhihong High's volleyball team despite having no initial interest in the sport.
- Nick Yang as Wang Chen-wen, Yu-hao's best friend who follows him into Zhihong High. He has a crush on his older step-brother, but keeps his feelings locked up.
- Patrick Shih as Wang Chen-wu, Yu-hao's other best friend and Chen-wen's older step-brother. Originally a 12th grade student, he gets held back a year after transferring schools with Yu-hao.
- Joe Hsieh as He Cheng-en, a 12th grade student. He is the captain of the volleyball club and is close friends with Tzu-hsuan.
- Hana Lin as Chiu Chien-ju, a 10th grade student at Bei Jiang High, Yu-hao's former school. Chien-ju is Tzu-hsuan's younger sister and develops a crush on Yu-hao after he saved her from bullies.
- Kong Rui-jun as Ho Chung-chung, Yu-hao's homeroom teacher and volleyball coach.
- Nemi Zong as Ho Hsiao-hsiao, a 12th grade student and Ho Chung-chung's younger sister. She is an assistant of the volleyball team and a huge fan of yaoi manga.
- Ryan Hsu as Chen Chia-chun, an 11th grade student and member of the volleyball team. He is jealous of Yu-hao's close relationship with Tzu-hsuan.
- Nate Wang as Li Chun-che, nicknamed "Xiao Ji Ji", an 11th grade student and member of the volleyball team.
- Tang Wei-qi as Li-chi, who Chen-wen mistakes as Chen-wu's girlfriend.
- Chang Han as Tseng Cheng-fan, Zhihong High's director.
- Liu Hung-min and Liu Hung-chieh make cameo appearances as themselves, members of the Renhe High volleyball team, Zhihong's rival school.

==== Film sequel ====
On August 17, 2018, Choco Media announced a film sequel, Crossover (Chinese: 跨界). Preparation for the film began after the broadcast of Crossing the Line in March 2018. Lu, Fan, Yang, and Shih will reprise their roles. The theatrical release for Crossing the Line 2 is planned for the fourth quarter of 2019. However, the plan was cancelled due to adjustment of content strategy due to the COVID-19 pandemic, subsequently announcing the fourth season being under works.

== HIStory3 ==
HIStory3 is the third season of the HIStory series, having a total of two miniseries, namely Trapped and Make Our Days Count, starring Jake Hsu and Chris Wu, Andy Bian and Kenny Chen, Wayne Song and Huang Chun-chih, and Wilson Liu and Thomas Chang as four couples for the two miniseries.

Miniseries	Episode count	First Aired	Last Aired	Director	Screenwriter(s)	Producer
HIStory3: Trapped (圈套)	20	April 16, 2019	June 12, 2019	Li Ching-jung	Lin Pei-yu, Shao Hui-ting	Rex Chang
HIStory3: Make Our Days Count (那一天)	20	October 16, 2019	December 18, 2019	Ishtar Tsai	Shao Hui-ting	Rex Chang

=== Trapped ===
Trapped (Chinese: 圈套) is the first miniseries of HIStory3, directed by Li Ching-jung and starring Jake Hsu, Chris Wu, Andy Bian and Kenny Chen.

Plot

A mysterious shooting leaves a police officer and the head of the Hsin Tien Group crime syndicate dead. Four years later, police investigator Meng Shao-fei is determined to hunt down Tang Yi, the sole survivor of the fateful shooting – and now the head of the Hsin Tien gang. Tang Yi is also hunting for answers but wants his own form of justice. He seems to want to exact his choice of punishment on the killer… although he appears to be hiding a dark secret. Is Tang Yi trying to protect someone?

Meng Shao-fei and Tang Yi become entangled in a deadly game of wits – a game that becomes all the more complicated after Tang Yi baits a love trap for Meng Shao-fei.

Cast

- Jake Hsu as Detective Meng Shao-fei, an officer of the third investigation platoon who gets wound up in a four-year long case involving the murder of a police officer and a triad leader.
- Chris Wu as Tang Yi, the adopted son of triad leader Tang Kuo-tung, one of the murder victims. Tang Yi vows to find the killer and "purify" Tang's triad from drugs and other illegal businesses.
- Andy Bian as Fang Liang-tien "Jack", Tang Yi's trusted bodyguard.
- Kenny Chen as Detective Chao Li-an, nicknamed "Zhao-zi", Shao-fei's friend and co-worker. Zhao-zi may be naive, but is extremely optimistic and loyal.
- Chou Ming-Yu as Tang Kuo-tung
- Dianne Lin as Tso Hung-yeh, the adopted daughter of Tang Kuo-tung.
- Sphinx Ting as Ku Tao-yi, a loyal follower of Tang Kuo-tung who develops feelings for Hung-yeh.
- Stanley Mei as Li Chih-te, Tang Yi's loyal follower who is also in love with him.
- Chen Chia-kuei as Chen Wen-hao, a powerful drug dealer whom is believed to be Tang Kuo-tung's killer.
- He Long as Detective Shih Ta-pao, leader of the third investigation platoon.
- Amy Yen as Detective Huang Yu-chi, an officer of the third investigation platoon who has a crush on Shao-fei.
- Kass Tsai as Chou Kuan-chih, an officer of the third investigation platoon who is linked to the murder case.

=== Make Our Days Count ===
Make Our Days Count (Chinese: 那一天) is the second miniseries of HIStory3, directed by Ishtar Tsai and starring Wayne Song and Huang Chun-chih, and Wilson Liu and Thomas Chang.

Plot

High schoolers Hsiang Hao-ting and Yu Hsi-ku appear to be polar opposites: While Hao-ting is an outgoing, hot-headed, extravert and part-time bully, Hsi-ku prefers to keep a low profile and focus on his schoolwork. What will happen when their two worlds collide as their relationship ensues?

Casts

- Wayne Song as Hsiang Hao-ting, a third-year high school student who is preparing for his college entrance exams
- Huang Chun-chih as Yu Hsi-ku, Hao-ting's love interest who assists him in his studies
- Thomas Chang as Lu Chih-kang, the owner of a dessert shop who falls for a high school student
- Wilson Liu as Sun Po-hsiang, nicknamed Sun Bo, Hao-ting's close friend and classmate who is comfortable with his sexual orientation, and has a crush on the older Chih-kang
- Sara Yu as Lin Tsai-chu, Hao-ting's mother
- Spark Chen as Hsiang Ching-chang, Hao-ting's father
- Brent Hsu as Sun Wen-chieh, Sun Bo's older cousin who owns the gym of where he works
- Hsia En as Hsia En, Hao-ting's close friend and classmate
- Hsia Te as Hsia Te, En's younger twin brother and fellow classmate
- Hao Shih as Kao Chun, Hao-ting's close friend and classmate
- Tsai Mu-fei as Hsiang Yung-ching, Hao-ting's younger sister
- Wang Chen-lin as Li Ssu-yu, Hao-ting's ex-girlfriend
- Cindy Chi as Liu Mei-fang, a fujoshi, friend of Li Ssu-yu and admires Yu Hsi-ku

== HIStory4 ==
HIStory4 is the fourth season of the HIStory series. Unlike its predecessors, it is one main series, Close To You.

=== Close To You ===
Close To You (Chinese: 近距離愛上你) is a miniseries of HIStory4, directed by Chen Yi-yu and starring Charles Tu, Anson Chen, Michael An, Lin Chia-wei and Cindy Chi.

Main Cast

- Charles Tu as Hsiao Li-cheng
- Anson Chen as Teng Mu-jen
- Michael An as Yeh Hsing-ssu
- Lin Chia-wei as Fu Yung-chieh
- Cindy Chi as Liu Mei-fang, a fujoshi
  - Cindy Chi first appeared as Liu Mei-fang in Make Our Days Count of HIStory3 as a supporting role.

Miniseries	Episode count	First Aired	Last Aired	Director	Screenwriter(s)	Producer
HIStory4: Close to You (近距離愛上你)	20	March 14, 2021	May 30, 2021	Chen Yi-yu	Shao Hui-ting	

== HIStory5 ==
HIStory5 is the fifth season of the HIStory series. Like season four, it is one main series, titled Love In the Future.

== Reception ==
The series has accumulated a large international following and is well-received by critics. In Taiwan, the series hit 3.5 million views after the first three months of release, and 16.5 million views by the end of the second season. Season two's HIStory2: Crossing the Line received critical acclaim for its characterization, directing, and acting, earning a Golden Bell nomination for Best Miniseries.

== Awards and nominations ==
Year	Ceremony	Category	Nominee	Result
2018	53rd Golden Bell Awards	Best Miniseries	HIStory2: Crossing the Line	Nominated
2020	55th Golden Bell Awards	Best Newcomer in a Television Series	Wilson Liu (HIStory3: Make Our Days Count)	Nominated
