= Ting Huang =

Taiwanese lyricist (born 1977)

Ting Huang (Chinese: 黃婷, born May 13, 1977) is a Taiwanese lyricist, A&R, concert PR, lecturer and writer. She was born in Kaohsiung, Taiwan, and received BA in Foreign Languages and Literature from National Taiwan University (NTU), MA in Journalism from Marshall University and MA in Film Studies from Iowa State University. Due to her degrees, Ting also had several years of professional experiences in the film industry.

== Career ==
=== Songwriter and A&R ===
In 2004, Ting began her career in the Chinese music industry from joining the studio of Jonathan Lee as an A&R. To date, she has been serving as an A&R for over a decade and supervised music projects for over 20 artists. In 2005, Ting began writing lyrics. The first song she has written was “Yi Hou 以後” by Wakin Chau (from the album “Wakin in the Rain 雨人”), and the first song she published was “I Still Remember 我還記得” by Fish Leong (from the album “Silk Road of Love 絲路”). Later, she joined B'in Music and worked with artists including Fish Leong, Rene Liu, Yen-j, Della, etc. Ting had been Della's A&R for years and also written numerous songs for her, including “Unable To Guess 猜不透”, the hit that made it to the top of KKBox chart within a week in 2008. In 2015, Ting left B'in Music and founded Non-Stop Studio, managing music projects and concert PR for singers like Stefanie Sun, Fish Leong, Wakin Chau, Da-Yu Lo, etc.

== Artistry ==
=== Early influences ===
Tom Chang is an important figure for Ting as she claims herself to be Tom's hardcore fans. Tom also served as one of the major influences that led Ting to enter the Chinese music industry. She would regain that drive of moving forward through listening to Tom's songs. Another singer whom Ting likes is Bobby Chen. She also published a series of prose for him in 2005, “Hen Sheng Ge – Sheng Mi Sui Yue 恨昇歌 – 昇迷歲月”.

=== Mindset for songwriting ===
Ting quoted Jonathan Lee's words at an interview, “Singing is like the extension of speech, the tone is very important. The songs that are selected into the album represent the speech and tone that the singer is going to portray. This decision-making process is fine art.” Under Lee's influence, Ting believes that if the singers read out the lyrics before recording, it will be helpful for them to interpret the tone and think about how to perform the song.

On the other hand, Ting also thinks about the different backgrounds and personalities of every singer when she tailor make the lyrics. For example, when she was writing Stefanie Sun's lyrics, she would pay extra attention to the language context. As the language context between Singaporean Chinese is different from that of Greater China, Ting would incorporate both the singer's background and market demands when writing the songs. On top of that, Ting would also take the singer's personality into account. For example, Della's character is more straightforward, courageous, and refuses to show her vulnerability. Ting also incorporated the singer's personality into the style of the music and lyrics while writing the songs.

=== Style ===
Ting has done many different genres of music before, including ballad, dance, rap, songs for commercials, and even songs for video games. Of the genres, ballad takes up about 70% of her work, as Ting is an expert in using straightforward and practical word choices to illustrate the emotional struggles in relationships. Ting believes that lyrics that move people are great lyrics, and has once stated in an interview, “whenever I write lyrics, there’s only one goal; that is, to make myself feel touched.”

Ting thinks that when writing lyrics for pop music, it is important to have the target audience and theme clear in mind. The point is to convey the emotions instead of going after embellished writing, as sometimes it is the colloquial and ordinary strings of words that can best touch the listeners. That was how Ting wrote “Unable To Guess" (猜不透) by Della.

At the same time, Ting emphasizes on the match between lyrics and melody, and serving the purpose of the song. For example, the song "I Love Him" (我愛他) (performed by Della) was tailor made according to the storyline of the TV drama Autumn's Concerto. This lyrics design matches and interacts perfectly with the melody flow, allowing listeners to immerse themselves into the song and in turn receive a stronger impact emotionally.

== Works Produced ==
Year	Singer	Album	Published by
2019	Fish Leong	The Sun Also Rises 我好嗎? – 太陽如常升起	Fish Music, Universal Music Group
2018	Wen Yin Liang	"Fu Jia Shi Zuo De Feng Jing 副駕駛座的風景”	Universal Music Group
2017	Stefanie Sun	No. 13 – A Dancing Van Gogh; No. 13作品－跳舞的梵谷	Universal Music Group
2016	Claire Kuo	"Loved" 我們曾相愛	Linfair Records
2015	Leo Ku	"Wo Men" (我們)	
2015	Rene Liu	"Wish You Well" (我要你好好的)	B'in Music
2015	Victor Wong	"Adulthood" (無法理解的大人)	Seed Music
2014	Stefanie Sun	"Kepler" (克卜勒)	Universal Music Group
2014	Wen Yin Liang	"Man Qing Ge" (漫情歌)	Universal Music Group
2014	Ding Dang	"Dare to Love" (敢愛敢當)	B'in Music
2013	Aska Yang	"First Love" (初.愛)	Universal Music Group
2013	Jia Jia	"Alone The Way" (為你的寂寞唱歌)	B'in Music
2013	Rene Liu	"Dear Passerby" (親愛的路人)	B'in Music
2012	Fish Leong	Love Reveals in the Long Run	Universal Music Group
2012	Yen-j	"Unicellular" (單細胞)	Universal Music Group
2012	Ding Dang	"One In a Thousand" (好難得)	B'in Music
2011	Yen-j	"Not Alone" (不孤獨)	Universal Music Group
2011	Victor Wong	"Unopened Gift" (未拆的禮物)	B'in Music
2010	Rene Liu	"Together " (在一起)	B'in Music
2010	Yen-j	"Thanks to Your Greatness" (謝謝你的美好)	Universal Music Group
2010	Ding Dang	Soulmate (未來的情人)	B'in Music
2009	Fish Leong	“Fall in Love & Songs" (靜茹＆情歌 –別再為他流淚)	Universal Music Group, B'in Music & Rock Records
2009	Ding Dang	"Night Cat" (夜貓)	B'in Music
2008	Victor Wong	"Na Xie Nyu Hai Jiao Wo De Shih" (那些女孩教我的事)	B'in Music
2007	Fish Leong	J’Adore	B'in Music

== Lyrics ==
Listing representative works in chronological order:

2019

Song	Singer	Note
我好嗎	Fish Leong	
類情人	Fish Leong	
完整的我	Fish Leong	
叮嚀	Bu Yi Mao	Written with Da-Yu Lo and Hong Yu Chen; Ending song of TV series “All is Well”
今夜星期三	Da-Yu Lo	Written with Da-Yu Lo
免費	Da-Yu Lo	Written with Da-Yu Lo
不能一起到最後	Kenny Wen	
You & I	Coco Lee	Written with GJ
斷了	Coco Lee	

2018

Song	Singer	Note
迷途	Wakin Chau	Theme song of web series “Mystery of Antiques 古董局中局”
流浪的終點	Wakin Chau	Theme song of animation “Cats and Peachtopia 貓與桃花源”
最遠的路	Wakin Chau	OST of animation “Cats and Peachtopia 貓與桃花源”
有我陪你	Wakin Chau	Theme song of movie “The Island 好戲一齣”
告訴你我的故事	Wakin Chau	
再見路易	Alex To	Written with Alex To
兩個人的秘密	Alex To	Written with Alex To and Yu Kwang-chung
愛過	Puff Kuo	
I Love You	Puff Kuo	
和平分手	Wen Yin Liang	
還好	Wen Yin Liang	
幕後歌	Paula Ma	Theme song of concert “Paula’s Journey to Love愛的旅程” in 2018
沒事	Paula Ma	Written with Jian Liang Lin
初心	Leo Ku	
愛因斯坦	Jin An	
我們總會好的	Apple Kho	
謝謝你離開我	Ming Chen	
完整的碎片	A-do	
不求	Roger Yang	

2017

Song	Singer	Note
兩難	Fish Leong	Opening song of “JOJO's World 我的四個男人”
在幸福的路上	Christine Fan	Theme song of the global tournament
不離不棄	Vui Chuan Tan	Theme song of movie “Beautiful Life生命拼圖”
金魚腦	Haor	Written with Haor
轉移話題	Haor	Written with Haor
女巫	Haor	Written with Haor
失戀是生命的常態	Haor	
備胎	Haor	Written with Haor
過一陣子打給你	Haor	Written with Haor
愛上一個女孩	Haor	
內心戲	Haor	Written with Haor and ICE
溫室開不出的花	Lami Girls	

2016

Song	Singer	Note
不是不寂寞	Della	Ending song of TV series “Royal Romance董鄂妃傳”
我不是你該愛的那個人	Pets Tseng	Ending song of TV series “KO One Re-member 終極一班4”
一個人也可以幸福	Sharon Kwan	Ending song of web series “Love Me我要讓你愛上我”
天空樹	Sharon Kwan	
還原	Wen Yin Liang	“1919 Christian Association Weak Child Assistance Program 基督教1919陪讀專案”; OST of TV series “Better Man 我的極品男友”
不期而遇	Wen Yin Liang	OST of TV series “Better Man 我的極品男友”; Ending song of Korean drama “Hogu's Love 初戀向前衝”
你不是一個人	Gigi Leung	Theme song of Malaysian movie “Beautiful Life 生命拼圖”
呵護	Fish Leong	Commercial song for NIVEA (mainland China)
台階	Philip Wu	
志同道合	Daniel Chezi	
放克泡麵	Daniel Chezi	
煙火燦爛我愛你	JR	
愛是你愛是我	Vanness Wu	
分手看看	Claire Kuo	Written with Percy Phang; Ending song of Korean drama “W W－兩個世界”
忘了如何遺忘	Claire Kuo	Written with Ling; Ending song of TV series “Nie Xiaoqian 聶小倩”
我們曾相愛	Claire Kuo	Opening song of Korean Drama “Five Enough 五個孩子”
傻傻愛著你	Claire Kuo	

2015

Song	Singer	Note
念念	Rene Liu	Ending song of movie “Murmur Of The Hearts 念念”; Nominated as “Best Original Film Song 最佳電影主題曲”by the 35th Hong Kong Film Awards
一路走下去	Rene Liu	Advertising song for movie “Born to Be King勝者為王”
歲月靜好	Rene Liu	
上海灘夜未眠	Pin Yuan Huang	Written with Pin Yuan Huang
愛不愛都寂寞	Lorene Ren	OST for Taiwan TV series “Someone Like You 聽見幸福”
聽見幸福	Lorene Ren	Theme song for Taiwan TV series “Someone Like You 聽見幸福”; featured Alan Ko
找到你是我最偉大的成功	Leo Ku	Opening song for Taiwan TV series “Be with you 好想談戀愛”
承擔	Leo Ku	OST for Taiwan TV series “Be with you 好想談戀愛”
無畏	Leo Ku	OST for Taiwan TV series “Be with you 好想談戀愛”
未完成的愛情	Michael Wong	Opening song for Korean drama “What Happens to My Family? 家人之間”
我不離開	Ailing Dai	
	A-Lin	
年少時代	Victor Wong	Opening song for Korean drama “Who Are You: School 2015 學校2015”
我一個人記得就好	Victor Wong	Ending song for TV series “The Day I Lost U 失去你的那一天”
現在就出發	Victor Wong	
可以的話	Fish Leong	Opening song for Chinese TV series “Angel Wings 隱形的翅膀”
全部給你	Chi Yu Yang	
告白趁現在	SNH48	Written with Akimoto Yasushi
我還是那個我	Yuki Hsu	

2014

Song	Singer	Note
半路	Rene Liu	Opening song for TV series “Bun Lou Fu Zi 半路父子”
渴	Stefanie Sun	Written with Neoh Kim Hin
美麗之外	Miya	
青苔	Miya	
我沒那麼愛你	Della	Ending song for TV series “The Demi-Gods and Semi-Devils 新天龍八部”; OST for TV series “Love Cheque Charge 幸福兌換券”
不要問	Della	Written with Shadya Lan; Opening song for TV series “Love Family 有愛一家人”
有一種勇氣叫放棄	Della	Written with Wei Ling Chen; Ending song for TV series “Sound of the Desert 風中奇緣”
好好過	Hugh	Written with Zhi Chang Chen; OST for TV series “Sound of the Desert 風中奇緣”
寂寞之光	Wen Yin Liang	Ending song for TV series “Dear Mom 我的寶貝四千金”
我們會再見	Wen Yin Liang	OST for TV series “Dear Mom 我的寶貝四千金”
漫情歌	Wen Yin Liang	
無關善良	Victor Wong	Written with Wei Ling Chen; OST for TV series “Scarlet Heart 2 步步驚情”
好時光	Della	Written with Richie Jen
	Wallace Huo	Opening song for TV series “Perfect Couple 金玉良緣”
傳世樂章	Silence Wang	Promotion song for the 6th anniversary “League of Legends 英雄聯盟”
過往	Yen-j	Written with Yen-j; OST for TV series “You Light Up My Star 你照亮我星球”
堅強過頭	Pets Tseng	

2013

Song	Singer	Note
忘了我	Aska Yang	Written with Jian Liang Lin; OST for TV series “A Good Wife 親愛的，我愛上別人了”
這一路走來	Aska Yang	
沒有甚麼不能	Aska Yang	Written with Aska Yang
初愛	Aska Yang	
妳值得	Alex To	
因為妳	Alex To	
愛她沒得救	Alex To	Written with Alex To, A-Niu, Victor Wong, Gary Chaw
跟隨你	Alex To	
闖關	Victor Wong	Theme song for “7Q 七雄Q傳”by Tencent web game
幸福就是	Rene Liu	Written with Wei Ling Chen
幸福不是情歌	Rene Liu	Written with Wei Ling Chen
身不由己	Della	Written with Yi Man Xiao; Theme song for TV series “Scarlet Heart 2 步步驚情”
分手後不要做朋友	Wen Yin Liang	Ending song for TV series “Déjà Vu 回到愛以前”
畢業生	Yen-j	Written with Yen-j
沒有答案	Yen-j	Written with Yen-j
好好說再見	David Tao	
	Sharon Kwan	
回憶裡的瘋狂	Michael Wong	
不等於	Jiajia	OST for TV series “Love Family 有愛一家人”
假裝快樂	Qing Xin	

2012

Song	Singer	Note
不是你的錯	Della	OST for TV series “ Inborn Pair 真愛找麻煩”; Ending song for TV series “Next Heroes 真的漢子”
一個人不可能	Della	Written with Yen-j; OST for TV series “ Inborn Pair 真愛找麻煩”; OST for web series “Ia Ia I Do 愛啊哎呀，我願意”; Ending song for TV series “Poetic Justice 微笑正義”
他還認不認得我	Della	Written with Shadya Lan; Ending song for web series “Ia Ia I Do 愛啊哎呀，我願意”
我還是一樣	Della	Written with Yi Qin Chen; Ending song for web series “Ia Ia I Do 愛啊哎呀，我願意”; OST for TV series “Miss Rose 螺絲小姐要出嫁”
不夠勇敢	Della	Written with Jun Wei Zhang Jian; OST for web series “Ia Ia I Do 愛啊哎呀，我願意”; OST for TV series “Miss Rose 螺絲小姐要出嫁”
下一道彩虹	Della	Opening song for drama “Refresh 刷新3+7”
會過去的	Fish Leong	8th KKBOX Music Awards; Place 91st in Top 100 Single of the Year 2012
環遊四季的愛	Fish Leong	Commercial song of Uni-President Braise Snow Pear And Rock Sugar
至少愛	Fish Leong	Written with Yen-j
一路兩個人	Fish Leong	
她	Fish Leong	Written with Jin Jin
Bon Jour	Fish Leong	Written with Fish Leong
幸福難不難	Yisa Yu	Theme song for “The Fierce Wife Final Episode 犀利人妻-最終回”
白日夢	Yisa Yu	Theme song for TV series “Wo Men Fa Cai Le 我們發財了！”
好想你也在	Yisa Yu	Written with Xi An Zhang
放不下	Yisa Yu	Written with Ya Jun Wang, Jian Liang Lin
一直	Yisa Yu	
經過	Rene Liu	Theme song for “C’est Quoi L’amour? 愛情限量版”
單身美好	Claire Kuo	Opening song for TV series “What Is Love 花是愛”
暫時的男朋友	Yen-j	Written with Yen-j; Ending song for TV series “Love, Now 真愛趁現在”
延長賽	Yen-j	
天空下	Christine Fan	
最美的	Landy Wen	
淚滴	Jiajia	Written with Jiajia
我太傻	Sita Chan	
第二情人	Sita Chan	
你終於離開我了	King Wang	
兩道彩虹	Moraynia	
第一次失戀	Sharon Kwan	
兩個人都有孤獨的勇氣	Aggie	

2011

Song	Singer	Note
女人三十	Miriam Yeung	OST for TV series “Inborn Pair 真愛找麻煩”
好的事情	Yen-j	Written with Yen-j; Graduation song of schools in Taiwan; Cantonese version of “Happiness幸福”; Ending song for TV series “Love You醉後決定愛上你”
又不是這樣就不孤獨	Yen-j	OST for TV series “Love You醉後決定愛上你”
沒有旋律配得上你	Yen-j	Written with Yen-j; Featured Rene Liu; Ending song for “Love Ali Mountain 戀戀阿里山”, self-produced TV series by Ctitv; Theme song for movie ” Mr. & Mrs. Single 隱婚男女”
好朋友只是朋友	Yisa Yu	OST for TV series “Office Girls 小資女孩向前衝”
已經與他無關	Yisa Yu	OST for “Local Hero 田庄英雄” self-produced TV series by TTV
愛永遠	Ailing Dai	Written with Huei Qun Li
Still in Love	Ailing Dai	Written with Huei Qun Li, Victor Lau
未來的情人	Della	Written with Yen-j
最後一次寂寞	Della	Written with Yen-j
很愛過	Della	
陪著我的時候想著她	Claire Kuo	
勇敢的靈魂	Victor Wong	Ending song for TV series “Love in the Wind 你是春風我是雨”
為你我想做更好的人	Victor Wong	Ending song for TV series “Sisters 姊妹” by TTV
我希望你快樂	Victor Wong	Written with Victor Wong
曬月光	Victor Wong	
風中的吉普賽	Victor Wong	
我渴望的美	Victor Wong	
再來一杯	Victor Wong	
六十億分之一	Alien Huang	
平凡相依	Della	Written with Wei Ling Chen; OST for TV series “Ring Ring Bell 真心請愛兩次鈴”
在黑暗中漫舞	Vivi	

2010

Song	Singer	Note
我們沒有在一起	Rene Liu	Ending song for TV series “PS Man偷心大聖PS男”
你不要送花給我	Rene Liu	
愛就是咖哩	Yen-j	Written with Yen-j; Opening song for TV comedy “Ni Yada 倪亞達”
i給得不夠	Yen-j	Written with Yen-j
左右	Ailing Dai	

2009

Song	Singer	Note
我愛他	Della	Opening song for TV series “Autumn's Concerto 下一站，幸福”
你為什麼說謊	Della	Written with Liu Ching
全世界不懂無所謂	Della	
愛情之所以為愛情	Fish Leong	Written with Jia Ying Wu; Ending song for TV series“My Queen 拜犬女王”
別再為他流淚	Fish Leong	Opening song for TV series“My Queen 拜犬女王”
當你想著我	Victor Wong	Featured Angelica Lee
走路回家	Victor Wong	Written with Mo Chen
24小時瘋狂	Nylon Chen	Written with Mo Chen

2008

Song	Singer	Note
漂流	Victor Wong	Theme song for movie “Just Love You 註定愛你”
最好的朋友	Victor Wong	
幸運草	Della	Collection of TV series “Autumn's Concerto 下一站，幸福”
猜不透	Della	
我不怕	Della	Rap: MC Hotdog
如果能在一起	Fish Leong	
離別的雪	Yi Jet Qi	
二十世紀少年	Yi Jet Qi	
一如既往	Yi Jet Qi	

2007

Song	Singer	Note
C'est la Vie	Fish Leong	
給未來的自己	Fish Leong	
我決定	Fish Leong	Written with Zhi Nian Lin
離家出走	Della	Written with Yue Shen Ye
其實幸福很簡單	Nicholas Teo	Written with Shane Bin and Gou Qing (Gou Lin)

2006

Song	Singer	Note
轉捩點	Victor Wong	Written with A-Guan
我以為	Victor Wong	
橋	Victor Wong	Written with Jian Qing Li
以後	Wakin Chau	

2005

Song	Singer	Note
相信	Leon Lai	Written with Jonathan Lee
迷亂情意	Leon Lai	
我還記得	Fish Leong	

== Published works ==
Genre	Title	Year, Publisher
Documentary	“Mayday Rocks 搖滾狂奔 – 五月天的搖滾巡迴記”	2007‧相信音樂
Prose	“Hen Sheng Ge – Sheng Mi Sui Yue 恨昇哥 – 昇迷歲月”	2005‧大塊文化
Documentary	“Double Vision 雙瞳研究讀本”	2002‧台灣角川
Documentary	“Millennium Mambo 千禧曼波電影筆記：侯孝賢的電影”	2001‧麥田
