= Mom Thinks I'm Crazy to Marry a Japanese Guy =

- Theatrical release poster
- Directed by: Akihisa Yachida
- Screenplay by: Shin'ichi Nomura
- Produced by: Akihisa Yachida
- Starring: Jian Man-shu; Yuta Nakano
- Music by: Daiki Tsuneta
- Production company: Duckbill Entertainment
- Distributed by: Mamadame (Japan); Double Edge Entertainment Corp (Taiwan)
- Release dates: May 27, 2017 (Japan); June 16, 2017 (Taiwan)
- Running time: 94 minutes
- Countries: Japan; Taiwan
- Languages: Mandarin; Japanese; Taiwanese
- Box office: NT$10.6 million (Taiwan)

Mom Thinks I'm Crazy to Marry a Japanese Guy (Chinese: 雖然媽媽說我不可以嫁去日本; Japanese: ママは日本へ嫁に行っちゃダメと言うけれど) is a 2017 romantic-comedy film directed by Akihisa Yachida. Based upon a non-fiction book by Mr. and Mrs. Mogi, the film is a co-production between Japan and Taiwan, and stars Jian Man-shu and Yuta Nakano. The film was theatrically released on May 27, 2017 in Japan and in Taiwan on June 16, 2017.

== Synopsis ==
Yi-han is a Taiwanese girl who not only has a love for Japanese culture, but also majors the language in college. One day, Yi-han receives a Facebook message from a Japanese guy named Mogi. From then on the pair begin to interact through Facebook. During a holiday trip to Taiwan, Mogi finally met Yi-han for the first time, where time seems to pass even more quickly when they are together. Over time, with the frequent exchanges of messages, they begin to develop mutual feelings for each other, but can they make things work despite the circumstances?

== Cast ==
- Jian Man-shu as Lin Yi-han
- Yuta Nakano as Mogi
- Lotus Wang as Lin's mother
- Lin Mei-hsiu as Akemi
- Yoshikazu Ebisu as Mogi's father
- Mondo Ōtani as Mogi's friend
- Takashi Okamoto as Mogi's friend
- Fion Sun as Ching-lan
- Eriku Yoza
- Don Li
- Sean Lin

== Soundtrack ==
=== Featured songs ===
No.	Title	Writer(s)	Performer	Length
1.	"Zui Chu Lai Dao Shi Jie De Mo Yang 最初來到世界的模樣"	Wu I-wei, The Little Prince	Shennio Lin
2.	"Hanbunko ハンブンコ"	Stolencinema	エリカヒトミ
3.	"Renai Reincarnation 恋愛リインカネーション"	Hink, Yuki Saitou	Color Pointe
