= Chang Qing =

Chinese swimmer

Personal information
- National team: China
- Born: November 1, 1966 (age 58); China

Sport
- Sport: Swimming
- Strokes: Backstroke
- Club: Win Tin Swimming Club

Chang Qing (born 1 November 1966) is a Chinese former swimmer who competed in the 1988 Summer Olympics.

After he left the Chinese national team, he became a coach for Win Tin Swimming Club (WTSC).
