= Chen Wei-ling (director) =

Taiwanese film and television director (1975–2023)

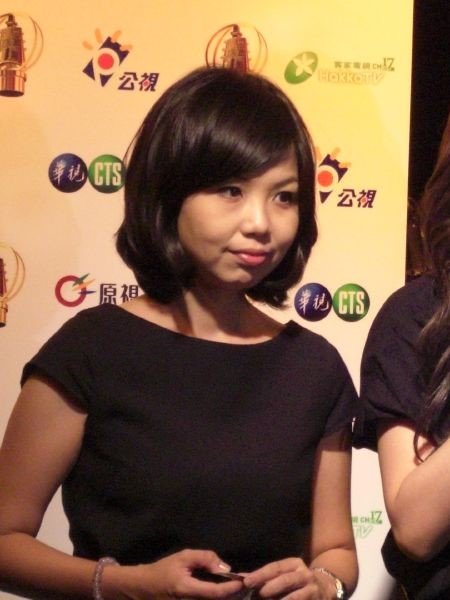
Chen attended the 43rd Golden Bell Awards ceremony in 2008

Chen Wei-ling (Chinese: 陳慧翎; pinyin: Chén Huìlíng; 4 March 1975 – 1 November 2023) was a Taiwanese director.

Chen won five Golden Bell Awards over the course of her career. She died from cervical cancer at the Taipei Municipal Wanfeng Hospital, on 1 November 2023, at the age of 48.

== Selected filmography ==
Television

- Autumn's Concerto (2009)
- Year of the Rain (2010)
- Material Queen (2011)
- Fiancee (2013)
- On Children (2018)
- Mom, Don't Do That! (2022)

Film

- The Moonlight in Jilin (2012)
- One Minute More (2014)
