= Zinnia Flower =

2015 Taiwanese film by Tom Lin Shu-yu

- Film poster
- Directed by: Tom Lin Shu-yu
- Screenplay by: Tom Lin Shu-yu
- Produced by: Liu Wei-jan
- Starring: Karena Lam; Stone; Ko Chia-yen; Umin Boya; Bryan Chang; Nana Lee; Gen Yan Tsai
- Cinematography: Yu Jing-pin
- Edited by: Chen Chun-hung
- Music by: Kung Yu-Chi
- Production company: Atomcinema Corporation
- Distributed by: Atomcinema Corporation
- Release date: October 8, 2015 (Taiwan)
- Running time: 96 minutes
- Country: Taiwan
- Languages: Mandarin; Japanese

Zinnia Flower (Chinese: 百日告別) is a 2015 Taiwanese film starring Karena Lam, Stone, Ko Chia-yen, Umin Boya, Bryan Chang, Nana Lee and Gen Yan Tsai. The film was released on October 8, 2015. It was chosen as the closing film of the Taipei Film Festival in 2015. It is based on the story of how director Tom Lin Shu-yu and a woman got over the pain of losing their loved ones during the 100 days following their deaths. Karena Lam won the Golden Horse Award for Best Leading Actress for her role in the film, and was also nominated for the Asian Film Award for Best Actress.

== Plot ==
Yu Wei and Shin Min lose their partners in the same multi-car crash. To cope, Yu Wei drinks excessively, while Shin Min cooks the recipes her fiancé had left day after day.

== Cast ==
- Karena Lam as Shin Min; loses her fiancé
- Stone as Yu Wei Chang; loses his wife, Xiao Wen, and his son
- Ko Chia-yen as Xiao Wen; Yu Wei's wife
- Umin Boya as Ren You, Shin Min's fiancé
- Chang Shu-hao as Ren Yi, Ren You's younger brother
- Nana Lee as Shin Ting, Shin Min's younger sister

== Release ==
The film premiered at the Taipei Film Festival in July 2015 before being released to general Taiwanese audiences in theaters early October.

An emotional sex scene was cut from the theatrical release after mixed reactions at the Taipei Film Festival. Lin said that he thought the discourse was leading audiences away from the film's focus on the grieving process.

== Soundtrack ==
Song title	Singer	Lyricist	Composer
"Zinnia Flower"	Sodagreen	Tsing Fong Wu	Yu Chi Kung (Sodagreen)

== Awards and nominations ==
52nd Golden Horse Awards

Year	Nominated	Awards	Result
2015	Karena Lam	Best actress	Won
2015	Tom Lin Shu-yu, Wei Ren Liu Zinnia Flower	Best original screenplay	Nominated
2015	Yu Chi Kung Zinnia Flower	Best original movie music	Nominated

10th Asian Film Awards

Year	Nominated	Awards	Result
2016	Karena Lam	Best actress	Nominated

19th Tallinn Black Nights Film Festival

Year	Nomination	Awards	Result
2015	International competition Tallinn Black Nights Film Festival	Special recommendation of Catholic Humanism Spirit Special Award	Won

9th CinemAsia Film Festival

Year	Nomination	Awards	Result
2016	International competition CinemAsia Film Festival	Tiger Beer Jury Award	Won
