= When a Wolf Falls in Love with a Sheep =

- Theatrical release poster
- Chinese: 南方小羊牧場
- Hanyu Pinyin: Nán Fāng Xiǎo Yáng Mù Chǎng
- Directed by: Hou Chi-jan
- Written by: Hou Chi-jan; Kelly Yang; Ho Shing-ming; Autumn Chen
- Produced by: Aileen Li
- Starring: Kai Ko; Jian Man-shu
- Cinematography: Patrick Chou
- Edited by: Chiang Yi-ning; Shieh Meng-ju
- Music by: Owen Wang
- Production companies: Strawberry Time Films; Film Magic Pictures
- Distributed by: Atom Cinema
- Release date: November 9, 2012
- Running time: 85 minutes
- Country: Taiwan
- Language: Mandarin
- Box office: NT$10 million (Taiwan); US$176,260 (international)

When a Wolf Falls in Love with a Sheep (also known as When Wolf Falls in Love with Sheep) is a 2012 Taiwanese romantic fantasy film directed by Hou Chi-jan and starring Kai Ko and Jian Man-shu.

== Premise ==
At the Nanyang Street neighborhood in Zhongzheng District where there are many cram schools, a young man works at a copy shop making copies for test papers, with hopes of encountering his girlfriend who had broken up with him via a post-it note. One day, he notices drawings of a sheep on a piece of test paper he's printing and he sets out to find the illustrator by drawing a wolf cartoon that dialogues with the sheep in response.

== Cast ==
- Kai Ko as Tung / Wolf
- Jian Man-shu as Hsiao Yang
- Kuo Shu-yao as Tsui Pao-pao
- Tsai Chen-nan as Photocopy shop boss
- Lin Ching-tai as Noodle stall owner / Priest
- Dennis Nieh as Cram school boss
- Lu Ting-wei as Fried Rice Man
- Nikki Hsieh as Tsai Yi-ying, Tung's ex-girlfriend
- Bryan Chang as Chiang Shuo-tao, Hsiao Yang's ex-boyfriend
- Peggy Tseng as Fried Rice Man's ex-girlfriend
- Fan Hsiao-fan as Hsiao Yang's mother
- Wu Pi-lien as Auntie Sticky Rice
- Kao Yi-ling as Chih
- Chuang Ching-shen as Locker renter guard
- Lai Pei-ying as Locker renter hairdresser
- Chou Min-fu as Enrolling student

== Soundtrack ==
When a Wolf Falls in Love With a Sheep (Original Motion Picture Soundtrack)

Soundtrack album by Various Artists
- Released: November 9, 2012
- Genre: Film soundtrack
- Length: 35:00
- Label: AsiaMuse Entertainment

No.	Title	Performer	Length
1.	"Once Upon a Time (Instrumental Version)"	Owen Wang	01:06
2.	"I'm Leaving (Instrumental Version)"	Owen Wang	01:51
3.	"Copy Center Rhapsody (Instrumental Version)"	Owen Wang	01:13
4.	"The Young-Spirited Nanyang Street (Instrumental Version)"	Owen Wang	01:17
5.	"Sure-Win Cram School (Instrumental Version)"	Owen Wang	01:54
6.	"Me, the Left Out Fool (Instrumental Version)"	Owen Wang	00:38
7.	"Lost & Found (Instrumental Version)"	Owen Wang	01:07
8.	"Copy Center Boss's Fortune Dream (Instrumental Version)"	Owen Wang	00:24
9.	"Flags March (Instrumental Version)"	Owen Wang	01:14
10.	"Sleepwalking (Instrumental Version)"	Owen Wang	01:21
11.	"Let's Share the Pasture (Instrumental Version)"	Owen Wang	01:31
12.	"Yang's Past (Instrumental Version)"	Owen Wang	02:45
13.	"Midnight Talk (Instrumental Version)"	Owen Wang	02:34
14.	"Rhythm of the Rain (Instrumental Version)"	John Gummoe	03:01
15.	"Story of the Golden Fried Rice Man (Instrumental Version)"	Owen Wang	01:58
16.	"Would There Be Forever and Ever (Instrumental Version)"	Owen Wang	01:42
17.	"Fly Fly Paperplane (Instrumental Version)"	Owen Wang	05:14
18.	"Thank You! Big Bad Wolf (Instrumental Version)"	Owen Wang	01:30
19.	"When a Wolf Falls in Love With a Sheep (Theme Song)"	Riin (The Girl and The Robots)	03:05

== Awards and nominations ==
Award ceremony	Category	Recipients	Result
7th Asian Film Awards	Best Newcomer	Jian Man-shu	Nominated
7th Asian Film Awards	Best Visual Effects	Chas Chau, Lewis Chan, Benson Poon, Johnny Lin, Shaun Su	Nominated
Asian Film Festival, Reggio Emilia	Most Original Film	When a Wolf Falls in Love with a Sheep	Won
2013 Fantasia International Film Festival	Best Director	Hou Chi-jan	Won
50th Golden Horse Awards	Best Visual Effects	Chas Chau, Lewis Chan, Benson Poon, Johnny Lin, Shaun Su	Nominated
50th Golden Horse Awards	Best Art Direction	Penny Tsai	Nominated
15th Taipei Film Awards	Best Technical Achievements	When a Wolf Falls in Love with a Sheep	Won
2013 Heartland Film Festival	Crystal Heart Prize	When a Wolf Falls in Love with a Sheep	Won
