= Jian Man-shu =

Taiwanese actress, screenwriter and director (born 1988)

- 簡嫚書
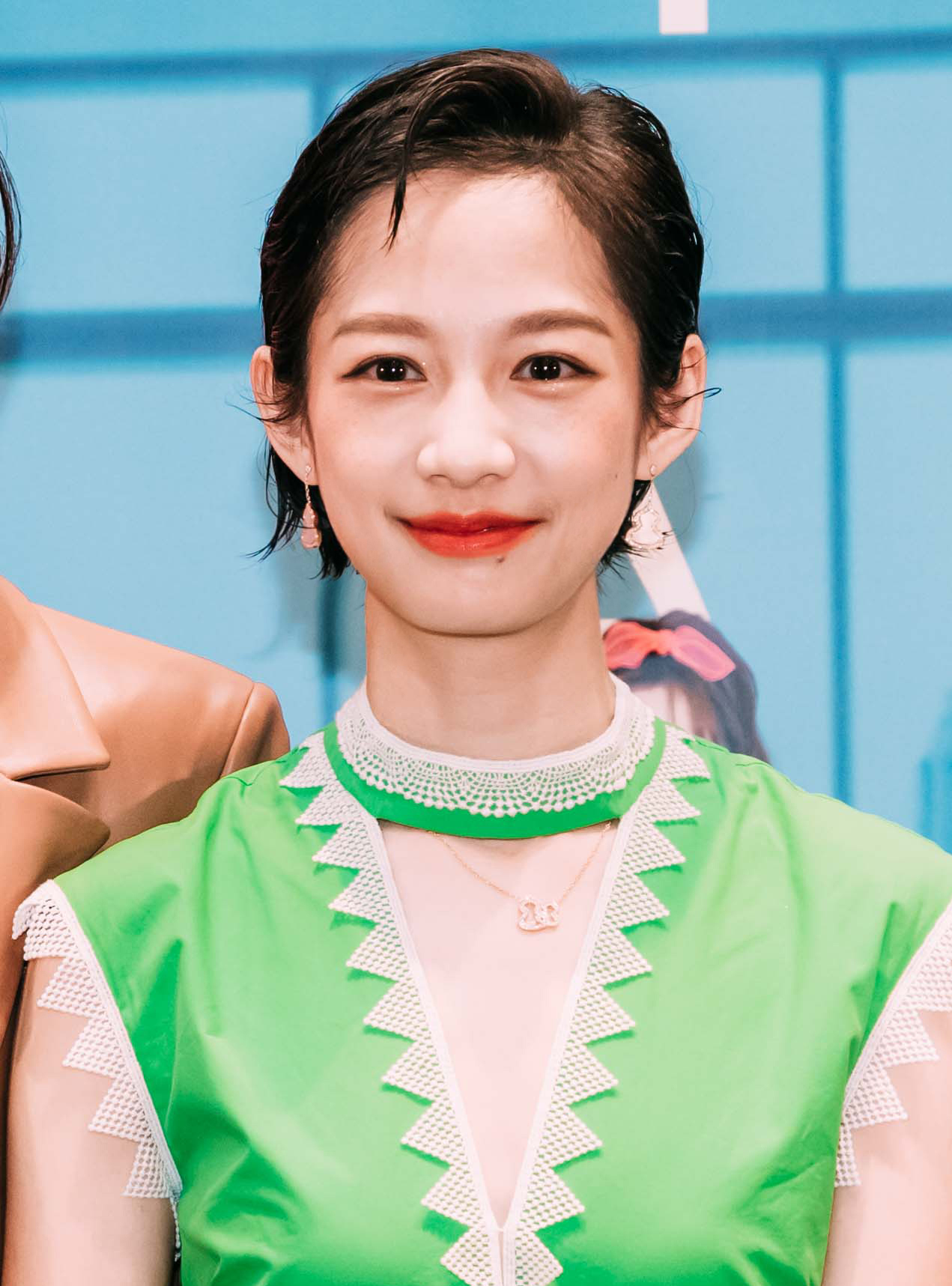
- Jian in 2021
- Born: 16 October 1988 (age 37); Taiwan
- Education: Taipei National University of the Arts
- Occupation: Actress
- Years active: 2010–present
- Spouse: Yun Chang-lung (m. 2017)
- Children: 1
- Musical career
- Also known as: Chien Man-shu

Jian Man-shu (Chinese: 簡嫚書; born 16 October 1988) is a Taiwanese actress, screenwriter and director. She is known for Year of the Rain, for which she was nominated for Best TV Series Actress at the 45th Golden Bell Awards.

In 2015, she was nominated for Best Supporting Actress for Maverick at the 52nd Golden Horse Awards. She won Best Supporting Actress for this role at the Taipei Film Festival. In 2021, she won Best Supporting Actress in a Television Series for her role in The Arc of Life at the 56th Golden Bell Awards.

== Early life ==
She graduated from the theatre program at Taipei National University of the Arts with a major in directing.

== Personal life ==
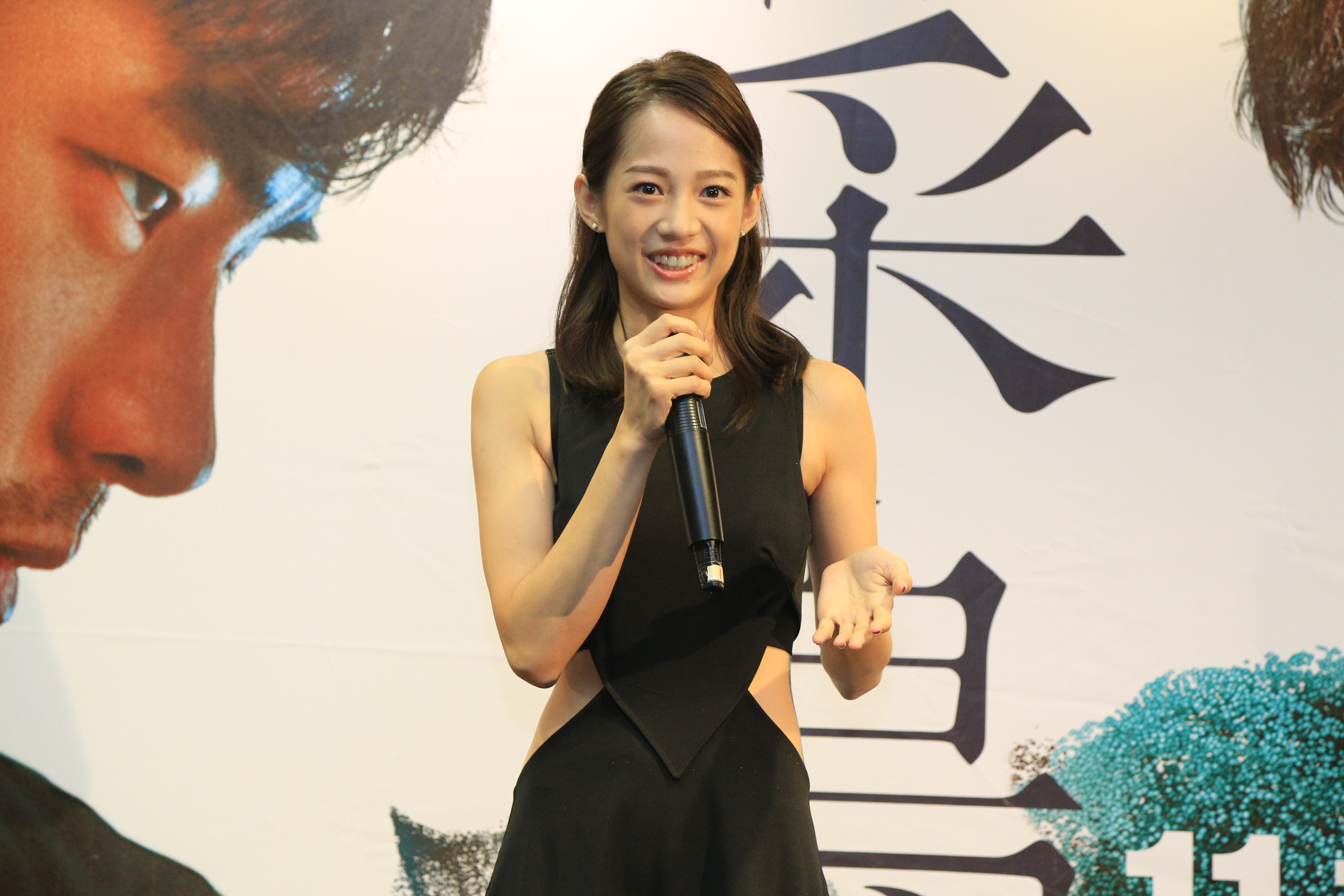
Jian in 2015

Jian Man-shu married Yun Chang-lung, a hairstylist who is 10 years older, on July 7, 2017.

On July 27, 2017, Jian revealed that she is pregnant with their first child.

== Filmography ==
=== Film ===
Year	Title	Role	Notes
2011	10+10	Young Chi Lu-hsia	Segment "Green Island Serenade"
2012	When a Wolf Falls in Love with a Sheep	Hsiao Yang	
2012	Love Is Sin		
2014	Twa-Tiu-Tiann	Rose	
2015	Maverick	Ann	
2017	Mom Thinks I'm Crazy to Marry a Japanese Guy	Lin Yi-han	
2018	Kafka's Lovers	Feng Li	
2019	Someone In The Clouds	Weng Hsiao-pei	
2025	The Final Piece		Japanese film
TBA	True Love Is a Ghost of a Chance		

=== Television series ===
Year	Title	Role	Notes
2010	Year of the Rain	Lin Yu-ching	
2012	Ex-boyfriend	Chih-ming's girlfriend	
2012	Love in the Wind	Tang Ching-chien	
2012	Fondant Garden	Cheng Mi-en	
2012	The Late Night Stop	Qingqing	
2013	Love SOS	Tong Lin	
2016	Close Your Eyes Before It's Dark	Hong Xiaotong	
2018	My Bittersweet Taiwan	Xie Shuang Mei	
2019	The Fearless	Sheng Yin	
2020	Animal Whisper	Ye Yitian	
2021	The Arc of Life	Lin Mei-ji	
2023	Love Yourself	Jiang Yi-qing	

=== Directorial works ===
Year	Title	Type	Note(s)
2016	Play	Short film	4th 48 Hour Film Project Taipei Award "BEST DIRECTOR" & "BEST CITY FILM"
2015	Open! Open!	Animated film	Co-director with Chang Hsiu-cheng
2014	Gift	Short film	2nd 48 Hour Film Project Taipei Award - Best Director
2013	Love SOS	Television series	Opening video

== Awards and nominations ==
Year	Award	Category	Nominated work	Result
2010	45th Golden Bell Awards	Best Actress	Year of the Rain	Nominated
2011	6th Seoul International Drama Awards	Best Actress	Year of the Rain	Nominated
2011	6th Seoul International Drama Awards	People's Choice Awards - Popular Actress	Year of the Rain	Won
2012	7th Asian Film Awards	Best Newcomer	When a Wolf Falls in Love with a Sheep	Nominated
2015	52nd Golden Horse Awards	Best Supporting Actress	Maverick	Nominated
2016	18th Taipei Film Awards	Best Supporting Actress	Maverick	Won
2021	56th Golden Bell Awards	Best Supporting Actress	The Arc of Life	Won
