= Bryan Chang =

Taiwanese actor

- 張書豪
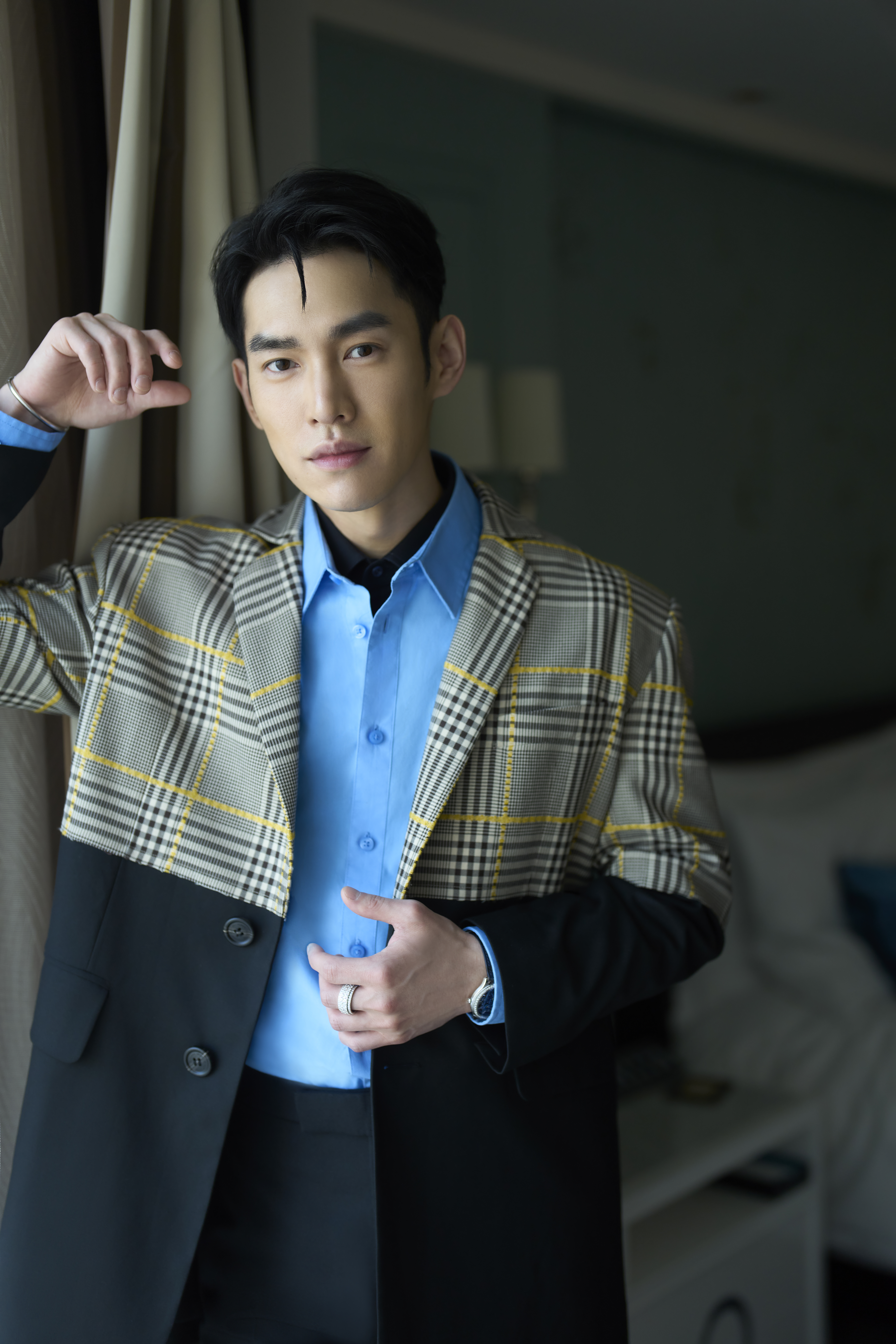
- Chang in 2023
- Born: 22 October 1988 (age 37); Taipei, Taiwan
- Education: Ming Chuan University (BA)
- Occupation: Actor
- Years active: 2006–present
- Musical career
- Also known as: Zhang Shu-hao

Bryan Chang or Chang Shu-hao (Chinese: 張書豪; Pe̍h-ōe-jī: Tiuⁿ Su-hô; born 22 October 1988) is a Taiwanese actor. He won the award for Best Actor in a Miniseries or Television Film at the Golden Bell Awards in 2007.

== Filmography ==
=== Television series ===
Year	English title	Original title	Role	Notes
2006	Dangerous Mind	危險心靈	Shen Wei	
2006	It's Fortunate That We Are Still Here	還好，我們都還在這裡	Baimu	
2008	Wish to See You Again	這裡發現愛	Ma Yung-rui (youth)	
2009	Game Winning Hit	比賽開始	Chiang Ching-cheng	alternative title: Play Ball
2010	Year of the Rain	那年，雨不停國	A-hai	
2010	Ni Yada	倪亞達	Hsiao-shuai	
2012	Kite's Blessing	風箏的祝福	Lai Pei-cheng	
2012	9AM	—N/a	Chang Ching-hsiang	
2013	Bad Boys' Diary	惡男日記	A-ke	
2014	Mr. Right Wanted	徵婚啟事	Lucifer	Cameo
2015	Baby Daddy	長不大的爸爸	Chang Po-yen	
2016	Memory	火車情人	Pei En-tien	
2016	Close Your Eyes Before It's Dark	天黑請閉眼	Lu Bo-cang	
2017	Family Time	酸甜之味	Pan Chih-chi	
2018	My Bittersweet Taiwan	台灣往事		
2018	On Children	你的孩子不是你的孩子	Ho Yi-Hsien	
2019	Deja Vu	回到愛以前	Wang Da-Le	
2020	The Haunted Heart	腦波小姐	Shih Ta-Yung	
2020	Futmalls.com	預支未來	Zhao Xu Zhen	

=== Film ===
Year	English title	Original title	Role	Notes
2008	1895	一八九五	Jiang Shao-zu	alternative title: Blue Brave: The Legend of Formosa in 1895
2010	One Day	有一天	Tsung	
2010	Rehearsal	—N/a	A director	Short film
2010	Action	—N/a		Short film
2010	Horse with No Name	無名馬	Liu Shang-sheng	Short film
2011	Door	門	Street artist	Short film
2011	Youth Movement	青春樂動	Chang Chia-kai	Short film
2011	One Mile Above	轉山	Chang Shu-hao	alternative title: Kora
2012	Girlfriend, Boyfriend	女朋友。男朋友	Sean	
2012	When a Wolf Falls in Love with a Sheep	南方小羊牧場	Chiang Shuo-tao	
2012	The Golden Child	金孫	A-kan	
2013	Apolitical Romance	對面的女孩殺過來	A-cheng	
2014	Meeting Dr. Sun	行動代號：孫中山	Head of Student Affairs Department	alternative title: Salute! Sun Yat-Sen
2015	Zinnia Flower	百日告別	Jen-yee	
2015	We Are Family	我們全家不太熟	Weili	
2017	Please Love Her			
2018	More than Blue	比悲傷更悲傷的故事	Yang You-hsien	

=== Variety show ===
Year	English title	Original title	Network	Notes
2012	On Board	請上車	The Travel Channel	Host

=== Music video appearances ===
Year	Artist	Song title
2012	Rainie Yang	"My Dear"
2014	Jolin Tsai	"We're All Different, Yet The Same"
2016	Amber Kuo	"Anchor"
2016	Hebe Tien	"When You Are Gone"

== Discography ==
=== Soundtrack album ===
Title	Album details	Track listing
Dangerous Mind OST 危險心靈電視原聲帶	Released: September 1, 2006; Label: Magnum Music; Formats: CD, digital download	Track listing: 1. 教室環遊

== Awards and nominations ==
Year	Award	Category	Nominated work	Result
2007	42nd Golden Bell Awards	Best Actor in a Miniseries or Television Film	It's Fortunate That We Are Still Here	Won
2012	14th Taipei Film Festival	Best Supporting Actor	Girlfriend, Boyfriend	Won
2012	49th Golden Horse Awards	Best Supporting Actor	Girlfriend, Boyfriend	Nominated
2012	2012 Chinese Young Generation Film Forum	Best New Actor	One Mile Above	Won
