= The Rose (TV soundtrack) =

The Rose Original Soundtrack
- The Rose Original Soundtrack cover

Soundtrack album 薔薇之戀 電視原聲帶 by Various artists
- Released: 20 June 2003
- Genre: Mandopop
- Language: Mandarin
- Label: HIM International Music

The Rose Original Soundtrack (traditional Chinese: 薔薇之戀 電視原聲帶; simplified Chinese: 蔷薇之恋 電視原聲帶; pinyin: Qiáng Wéi Zhī Liàn Diànshì Yuánshēngdài) is the soundtrack for the 2003 Taiwanese drama, The Rose, starring Ella of S.H.E, Jerry Huang, Joe Cheng, and Joelle Lu. Although The Rose was produced in Taiwan, where Traditional Chinese script is used, the drama uses a Simplified Chinese title.

It was released by HIM International Music on 20 June 2003. The music video for "花都開好了" (Flowers Have Blossomed) was S.H.E's first outdoor music video since Youth Society's "熱帶雨林" (Tropical Rain Forest). Selina and Joe Cheng starred in the music video for "葉子" (Leaf).

The track "花都開好了" (Flowers Have Blossomed) is listed at number 29 on Hit Fm Taiwan's Hit Fm Annual Top 100 Singles Chart (Hit-Fm年度百首單曲) for 2003. The album won Best Original Soundtrack at the 2004 HITO Radio Music Awards presented by Taiwanese radio station Hit FM.

== Track listing ==
1. "花都開好了" (Flowers Have Blossomed) - S.H.E - opening theme
2. "葉子" (Leaf) - A-Sun - ending theme
3. "搖籃曲" (Lullaby) - Power Station
4. "The Rose" (Note: sung in English.) - A-Sun
5. "也許有一天" (One Day) - JS (JS (組合) 陳忠義& 陳綺萱)
6. "傷口" (Wounds) - Z-Chen (張智成)
7. "野百合也有春天" (Spring) - A-Sun
8. "花都開好了" (夏日盛開版) (Flowers Have Blossomed summer instrumental)
9. "葉子" (演奏版) (Leaves instrumental)
10. "搖籃曲" (演奏版) (Lullaby instrumental)
11. "花都開好了"(春光明媚版) (Flowers Have Blossomed spring instrumental)

VCD

1. The Rose highlights (薔薇之戀全劇精華大綱)
2. "花都開好了" (Flowers Have Blossomed) MV
