= Holding Back the Tears =

2010 studio album by Freya Lim

- Holding Back The Tears (Pre-order Version) cover

Studio album 眼淚流回去 by Freya Lim
- Released: 24 December 2010
- Genre: Mandopop
- Language: Mandarin
- Label: Rock Records
- Producer: Jim Lee (music producer)

Freya Lim chronology
Freya's Love Songs 非愛不可。心林凡 (2007)	Holding Back the Tears (2010)	Accidentally in Love 愛情_很突然 (2012)

Alternative cover
- Holding Back The Tears (Special Edition) cover

Holding Back the Tears (Chinese: 眼淚流回去; pinyin: yǎn lèi liú huí qù) is the fourth studio album of Taiwan-born Malaysian Mandopop artist Freya Lim (Chinese: 林凡). It was released on 24 December 2010 by Rock Records. It is the third Mandarin and comeback album of Freya, after three years away from the music scene due to contractual issues with her previous record label Linfair Records Ltd.

The album is produced by renowned Taiwanese producer Jim Lee, who initially got Freya to perform two singles for Taiwan basketball drama Hot Shot soundtrack in 2008, and in turn helped to pave the way for Freya to release a new Mandarin album after her few years of hiatus.

== Track listing ==
No.	Title	Lyrics	Music	Translation	Length
1.	"重傷 (zhòng shāng)"	魯維孝	Adrian Fu	Wounded	4:02
2.	"當我想起你時笑了 (dāng wǒ xiǎng qǐ nǐ shí xiào le)"	Wu Xiangfei	李冰	When I Think of You	4:43
3.	"五天幾年 (wǔ tiān jī nián)"	Wu Xiangfei	曲世聰	5 Days	3:55
4.	"飛了 (fēi le)"	Paul Wong, GJ	GJ	Flown	4:18
5.	"最美的意外 (zuì měi de yì wài)"	Wu Xiangfei	KSK (Kevin Kumar, Sean Kumar)	Beautiful Surprise	4:55
6.	"眼淚流回去 (yǎn lèi liú huí qù)"	Wu Xiangfei	曲世聰	Holding Back the Tears	3:24
7.	"這樣愛你好可怕 (zhè yàng ài nǐ hǎo kě pà)"	Albert Leung	GJ	Scared	4:49
8.	"記得懂得捨得 (jì dé dǒng de shě de)"	Wu Xiangfei	小慈	Letting Go	5:10
9.	"蝴蝶效應 (hú dié xiào yīng)"	David Ke	Lisa Hsieh	Butterfly Effect	4:41
10.	"Say What You Want"	Adrian Fu	Adrian Fu		4:04
11.	"重生(五合一) (chong shēng (wǔ hé yī))"	魯維孝/Albert Leung/Wu Xiangfei	Adrian Fu/曲世聰/小慈	Rebirth	7:35

== Music videos ==
- "重傷" (Wounded) MV
- "五天幾年" (5 Days) MV
- "眼淚流回去" (Holding Back the Tears) MV
- "這樣愛你好可怕 " (Scared) MV feat. scenes from popular Taiwan TTV drama The Fierce Wife
- "記得懂得捨得" (Letting Go) MV
