= Rayzha Alimjan =

Chinese actress and model of kazakh descent (born 1986)

- Риза Әлімжанқызы; Риза Әлімжан
- Born: 15 July 1986 (age 40); Haidian District, Beijing, China
- Education: Beijing Film Academy
- Occupations: Actress; model
- Years active: 2010–present
- Notable work: Empresses in the Palace; The Longest Day in Chang'an
- Children: 1

Chinese name
- Traditional Chinese: 熱依扎·阿里木江
- Simplified Chinese: 热依扎·阿里木江
Transcriptions
Standard Mandarin
- Hanyu Pinyin: Rèyīzhā Ālǐmùjiāng

Rayzha Alimjan (Kazakh: Риза Әлімжанқызы; Chinese: 热依扎·阿里木江; born 15 July 1986) is a Chinese actress and model of Kazakh ethnicity.

== Early life and education ==
Rayzha Alimjan was born in Haidian District of Beijing, on 15 July 1986, while her ancestral home is in Jinghe County, Xinjiang. Her maternal grandmother was a school teacher. Her father is a writer. She graduated from Beijing Film Academy.

== Career ==
Rayzha Alimjan began her career as a fashion model when she was a high school student.

She made her film debut in Flirting Scholar 2 (2010), playing a maidservant.

Rayzha Alimjan's first notice came with her role as Concubine Ning on the 2011 historical television series Empresses in the Palace.

In 2012, she received her first leading role in a series called Ia Ia, I Do.

In 2013, she starred opposite Qi Wei, Melvin Sia, Chen He, Lou Yixiao, and Zhang Danfeng in the romantic comedy television series Love Destiny.

In 2014, she landed a guest role on Young Sherlock.

Rayzha Alimjan was cast in Xu Jinglei's romance film Somewhere Only We Know (2015), playing the girlfriend of Juck Zhang's character.

In 2016, she headlined three films: Inside or Outside, Kill Time (film) and Never Said Goodbye. She had a supporting role in Singing All Along, a television adaptation based on the romance novel Splendid and Beautiful Rivers and Mountains by Li Xin.

Rayzha Alimjan played the female lead role in the romantic comedy film La Historia Du Un Amor (2017), alongside Zheng Kai, who played her boyfriend. That same year, she played a supporting role in Tribes and Empires: Storm of Prophecy, starring Huang Xuan, Shawn Dou, Xu Lu, Zhang Jianing and Janice Man and directed by Cao Dun.

In 2018, she played Gu Xueying, the lead role in Yang Yang's war drama The Snow Queen, costarring Dylan Kuo.

She had a major role in the historical suspense drama The Longest Day in Chang'an (2019), which starred Lei Jiayin and Jackson Yee.

In 2021, she had key supporting role in Minning Town, a 23-episode television series based on the decades-long battle against poverty northwest China's Ningxia Hui Autonomous Region.

== Personal life ==
On 5 December 2020, she announced that she had given birth to a daughter on her personal Sina Weibo account.

== Filmography ==
=== Film ===
Year	English title	Chinese title	Role	Notes
2010	Flirting Scholar 2	唐伯虎点秋香2之四大才子	A maidservant	
2010	My Spectacular Theatre	盲人电影院	Xiao Ou	
2015	Somewhere Only We Know	有一个地方只有我们知道	Shan Shan	
2016	Inside or Outside	真相禁区	Nan Fang	
2016	The New Year's Eve of Old Lee	过年好	Zhu Li	
2016	Kill Time	谋杀似水年华	Qian Ling	
2016	Never Said Goodbye	谎言西西里	Ruby	
2017	La Historia Du Un Amor	临时演员	Liang Danni	
2017	Strangers	缉枪		
2018	The Morning After	断片之险途夺宝	Conductor	

=== Television ===
Year	English title	Chinese title	Role	Notes
2011	Empresses in the Palace	后宫甄嬛传	Concubine Ning	
2012	Ia Ia, I Do	爱啊哎呀，我愿意	Tong Hua	
2013	Love Destiny	爱情自有天意	Tian Xin	
2014	Young Sherlock	少年神探狄仁杰	Shen Ji	
2016	Singing All Along	秀丽江山之长歌行	Ding Rou	
2017	Tribes and Empires: Storm of Prophecy	九州·海上牧云记	Jin Zhuhai	
2018	The Snow Queen	北国英雄	Gu Xueying	
2019	The Longest Day in Chang'an	长安十二时辰	Tan Qi	
2021	Minning Town	山海情	Li Shuihua	Flying Apsaras Award for Outstanding Actress; Huading Awards for National Audience's Favorite Top 10 Actors; Nominated - Magnolia Award for Best Actress; Nominated - Golden Eagle Award for Best Actress (China)
2023	Love Is Full of Jiudaowan	情满九道弯	Ye Fei	

=== Variety show ===
Year	English title	Chinese title	Role	Notes
2014	X-space	星星的密室	Guest	
2015	Youth Trainee	青春练习生	Guest	
