= Zheng Hun Qi Shi =

Zheng Hun Qi Shi may refer to:

- The Personals (1998 film), a Taiwanese film directed by Chen Kuo-fu
- Mr. Right Wanted, a 2014 Taiwanese TV series directed by Lien Yi-chi
