= Accidentally in Love =

Accidentally in Love may refer to:

- Accidentally in Love (album), a 2012 album by Freya Lim
- Accidentally in Love (TV series), a 2018 Mandarin-language Chinese television drama television series
- "Accidentally in Love" (song), a 2004 song by Counting Crows from the soundtrack of Shrek 2
- Accidentally in Love, a 2011 novel by Indian writer Nikita Singh
