= Time Doesn't Heal =

Studio album 歲月這把刀 by Freya Lim
- Released: 2 May 2014
- Genre: Mandopop
- Length: 45:09
- Language: Mandarin
- Label: Rock Records
- Producer: Jim Lee

Freya Lim chronology
Accidentally in Love 愛情_很突然 (2012)	Time Doesn't Heal (2014)

Time Doesn't Heal (Chinese: 歲月這把刀; pinyin: suì yuè zhè bǎ dāo) is the sixth Mandarin studio album by Taiwan-born Malaysian Mandopop artist Freya Lim (Chinese: 林凡). It was released on 2 May 2014 by Rock Records.

== Track listing ==
No.	Title	Lyrics	Music	Translation	Length
1.	"明明愛你" (míng míng ài nǐ)	Shine Lee	Pam Chung	Hidden Love	5:25
2.	"我們的故事只講了一半" (wǒ men de gù shì zhǐ jiǎng le yī bàn)	Qu Shi Cong (曲世聰)	Qu Shi Cong	Unfinished Story	4:12
3.	"套不住" (tào bù zhù; featuring Adrian Fu)	WaWa	Adrian Fu	Free Spirit	3:45
4.	"一戀愛就亂了" (yī liàn ài jiù luàn le)	WaWa	Andy Willcocks	Lost in Love	5:04
5.	"愛已經受傷" (ài yǐ jīng shòu shāng)	Shine Lee	Adrian Fu	Hurting Love	4:31
6.	"歲月這把刀" (suì yuè zhè bǎ dāo)	Qu Shi Cong	Qu Shi Cong	Time Doesn't Heal	4:20
7.	"目送" (mù sòng)	Qu Shi Cong	Qu Shi Cong	Farewell	4:05
8.	"很遠的近" (hěn yuǎn de jìn)	Wu Xiang Fei (吳向飛)	Sean.Z (張峽浩)	Near Yet Far	4:28
9.	"豔遇" (yàn yù)	Yao Chien	GJ	Romance	4:37
10.	"還原" (huán yuán)	Wu Xiang Fei	Russell Harris	Reset	4:42
Total length:					45:09

Notes

- "歲月這把刀 (Time Doesn't Heal)" is the closing theme song of the television series Fabulous 30 (女人30情定水舞間).
- "我們的故事只講了一半 (Unfinished Story)" is featured in the television series Just You.
- "明明愛你 (Hidden Love)" is the closing theme song of the television series In a Good Way.

== Music videos ==
Song	Release date	Notes	Ref
"我們的故事只講了一半" (Unfinished Story)	20 January 2014	Featuring clips from television series Just You	
"明明愛你" (Hidden Love)	28 March 2014		
"歲月這把刀" (Time Doesn't Heal)	27 April 2014	Featuring You-ning Cao (曹佑寧)	
