= Accidentally in Love (album) =

- Accidentally in Love (Eternal Hardcover Edition) cover

Studio album by Freya Lim
- Released: 27 April 2012
- Genre: Mandopop
- Language: Mandarin
- Label: Rock Records
- Producer: Jim Lee

Freya Lim chronology
Holding Back The Tears (2010)	Accidentally in Love (2012)	Time Doesn't Heal (2014)

Alternative covers
- Accidentally in Love (Arclight First Press Edition) cover

Alternative cover
- Accidentally in Love (Repackaged Version) cover

Accidentally in Love (Chinese: 愛情_很突然; pinyin: ài qíng hěn tū rán) is the fifth studio album of Taiwan-born Malaysian Mandopop artist Freya Lim (Chinese: 林凡). It was released on 27 April 2012 by Rock Records.

The album has two editions on its initial release: the Arclight First Press Edition (吉光初回版) which includes pre-order gift choices of either an essential oil set (聊愛香氛組) or a cosmetics set (彩妝知己組), and the Eternal Hardcover Edition (永恆精裝版) which includes an autographed CD (聊愛音樂故事 Freya's shorts 為愛朗讀) and an essential oil set (聊愛香氛組). A repackaged version of the album (療愛聊愛夏日慶功版), released on 8 June 2012, contains a VIP pass to Freya's mini-concert at music cafe Good Cho's on 30 June 2012.

== Track listing ==
No.	Title	Lyrics	Music	Translation	Length
1.	"睡在一起的知己 (shuì zài yī qǐ de zhī jǐ)"	Albert Leung	Andy Willcocks	Intimate Friend	5:06
2.	"痛癢 (tòng yǎng)"	Qu Shi Cong (曲世聰)	Qu Shi Cong	Nothing Unusual	4:19
3.	"告別像低迴溫婉的小調 (gào bié xiàng dī huí wēn wǎn de xiǎo diào)"	Albert Leung	Adrian Fu	Whispered Goodbye	4:12
4.	"我的病 (wǒ de bìng)"	Zhou Qi Er (周啟儿)	GJ	My Neurosis	4:11
5.	"不痛不快 (bù tòng bù kuài)"	Albert Leung	Russell Harris	Satisfaction	3:44
6.	"不一定 (bù yī dìng)"	Zhou Qi Er	Andy Willcocks、Russell Harris	Maybe	4:37
7.	"幸福很突然 (xìng fú hěn tū rán)"	Wu Xiang Fei (吳向飛)	Qu Shi Cong	Love Suddenly	4:28
8.	"缺口 (quē kǒu)"	Wu Xiang Fei	Pam Chung (鍾達茵)	Rift	4:02
9.	"你還在 (nǐ huán zài)"	David Ke	Adrian Fu	I Believe in You	4:12
10.	"You Said You Would"	Adrian Fu	Adrian Fu		4:12
11.	"不能更快樂嗎 (bù néng gèng;gēng kuài lè mǎ)"	Zhou Qi Er	C.Y. Kong	Can I Be Happier	4:25
12.	"告別缺口，知己... (睡在一起的知己／痛癢／不痛不快／缺口／告別像低迴溫婉的小調)"			Accidentally in Love Medley	7:55

== Music videos ==
- "睡在一起的知己" (Intimate Friend) MV
- "痛癢" (Nothing Unusual) MV
- "告別像低迴溫婉的小調" (Whispered Goodbye) MV featuring singer-songwriter Adrian Fu
- "缺口" (Rift) MV featuring actor Danny Liang (梁正群)

== Notes ==
- Rift (缺口) and Love Suddenly (幸福很突然) are interlude songs of Taiwan Sanlih E-Television SET Metro drama Gung Hay Fat Choy{我們發財了}
- Nothing Unusual (痛癢) is the ending theme song for Taiwan Public Television Service drama Man‧Boy (小孩大人)
- Whispered Goodbye (告別像低迴溫婉的小調) is the ending theme song of Korean drama Flower Boy Ramen Shop during its airing in Taiwan Videoland Television Network
- I Believe in You (你還在) is the ending theme song of Taiwan Chinese Television System drama Gentle Mercy (溫柔的慈悲)
