= Ric Huang =

Taiwanese singer and actor

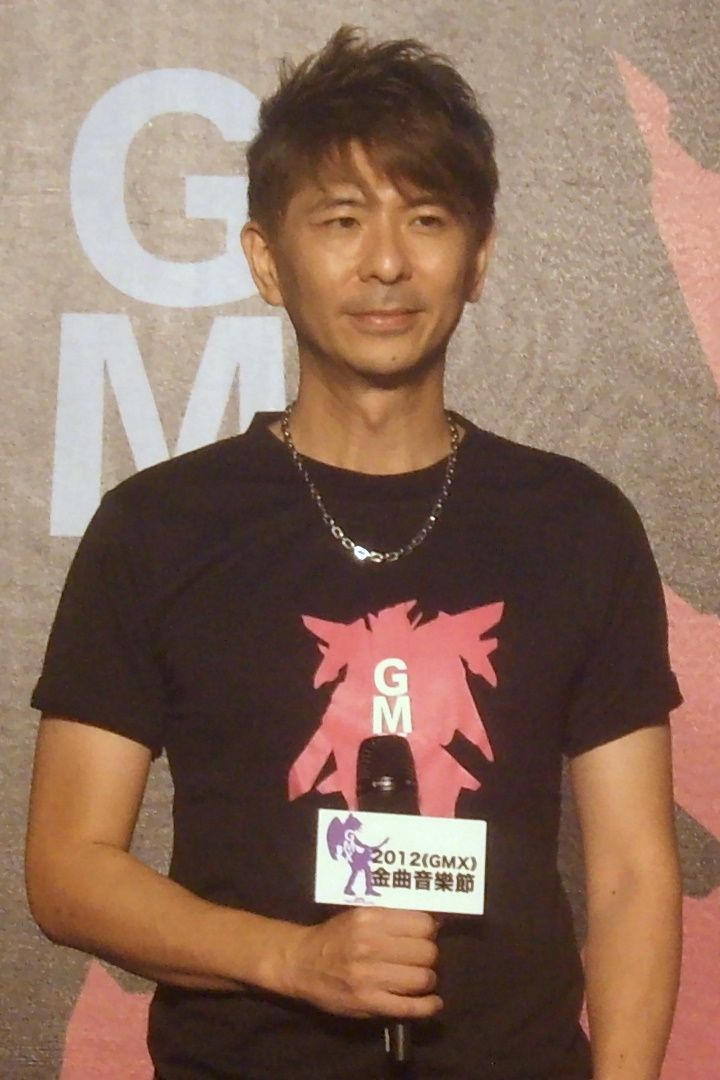
Ric of Pili Drama

Ric Huang (Chinese: 荒山亮; Pe̍h-ōe-jī: Hong San-liōng; born Jan Shan-liang (Chinese: 簡世亮; Pe̍h-ōe-jī: Kán Sè-liōng) 6 September 1968) is a Taiwanese singer and actor.

As an actor, Huang is known for his appearances on Pili, and has also played recurring characters on Borrow Your Love and When I See You Again. He is a Mandopop and Hokkien pop singer-songwriter, and in 2012, won the Golden Melody Award for Best Taiwanese Male Singer. The next year, Huang performed at the Golden Melody Award ceremony. Huang has performed at the Pier 2 Arts Center in Kaohsiung, Riverside Live House in Taipei, as well as Legacy Taipei, and the affiliated Legacy Taichung.
