= Lucky Days (TV series) =

- Promo poster
- Also known as: 第二回合我愛你
- 第二回合我愛你
- Genre: Drama
- Created by: Sanlih E-Television
- Written by: Mag Hsu; Sharon Mao; Chou Ping-chi; Chen Chiu-ju; Hsieh Ping-hsun
- Directed by: Wang Ming-tai; Hsu Fu-chun
- Starring: Chris Wang; Tammy Chen
- Opening theme: Red Flower (紅花樂團) "第二回合我愛你" (Lucky Days/ Ti Erh Hui Ho Wo Ai Ni)
- Ending theme: Iris Lin (林綾) "在我身邊" (By My Side/ Tsai Wo Shen Pien)
- Country of origin: Taiwan
- Original languages: Mandarin; Taiwanese
- No. of seasons: 1
- No. of episodes: 169

Production
- Executive producer: Tan Yung-hsin
- Producer: Wang Pei-hua
- Production location: Taiwan
- Cinematography: Li Ching-ti
- Editor: Wu Pao-yu
- Running time: 90min
- Production companies: Good Whale Studio; Wang Pei-hua Studio

Original release
- Network: Taiwan Television; SET Metro
- Release: January 1 – July 30, 2010

Related
- The Year of Happiness and Love; Ni Yada

Lucky Days (simplified Chinese: 第二回合我爱你; traditional Chinese: 第二回合我愛你; pinyin: Dì’èr huíhé Wǒ’àinǐ; Wade–Giles: Ti Erh Hui Ho Wo Ai Ni), also known as I Love You in the Second Round, is a 2010 Taiwanese television series starring Tammy Chen and Chris Wang which first premiered on January 8, 2010 on TTV and SETTV.

== Synopsis ==
The only reason money-grabbing magazine editor Chen Miao Ru and unambitious working man Ren Xiao Guo got married was because of money. Miao Ru got caught in a financial bind due flipping houses. Pooling their resources was the only to prevent a financial crisis of her own. However, married life was nothing like their peaceful dating life. Soon, they were on the verge of divorce. Yet, Ren doesn't to divorce. A mysterious computer with a program in the county clerk's bathroom allowing him to time travel to his past and make changes.

== Cast ==
=== Main ===
- Tammy Chen as Chen Miao-ju
- Chris Wang as Jen Hsiao-kuo

=== Supporting ===
- Fan Kuan-yao as Huang Yung-yuan
- A Hsi as Chen Kun-shan
- Lin Mei-hsiu as Lin Mei-man
- Ma Nien-hsien as Tsai Yu-min
- Chiang Li-li as Mrs. Huang
- Tu Tai-Feng as Ke Ai
- Kuan Yung as Jen's Dad
- Ying Tsai-ling as Jen's Mom
- Lin Wei-lias Jen Hsiao-chieh
- Mario as Hsu Mao-heng
- Yvonne Yao as Ms. Chi
- Hu Ying-chen as Fang Yen-hsiu
- Ke Shu-yuan as Mr. Hsiao
- Jessica Song as Chen Hsin-ju
- Wang Chien-min as Abra Yu
- Chen Yu-fang as Chiu Shu-chuan
- Peggy Fu as Mimi

== Publications ==
- Yun-ju Liang (梁蘊如) (February 2010). Lucky Days: The Novel. Sanlih E-Television. TTV Culture (Taiwan) Co., Ltd. ISBN 978-957-565-872-4.
- Sanlih E-Television (January 2010). Lucky Days: The Game Book. Sanlih E-Television. China Times Weekly (Taiwan) Co., Ltd. ISBN 9789867586971.
