= Westgate Tango =

- Theatrical poster
- Traditional Chinese: 西門町
- Simplified Chinese: 西门町
- Directed by: Wei Wang
- Written by: Wang Wei; Melody Chu; H.Pheobe Huang; Richard Lin
- Produced by: Melody Chu; Eric Hsu
- Starring: Dylan Kuo; Amber An; Anthony Wong; Denny Tsao; Jett Lee; Toyoharu Kitamura
- Cinematography: Yu Jing-pin
- Edited by: Lei Cheng-ching Lei
- Music by: Chen Chien-chi
- Production companies: WM Film Co., Ltd.
- Distributed by: Universal Pictures
- Release date: September 7, 2012
- Running time: 110 minutes
- Country: Taiwan
- Languages: Mandarin; Taiwanese; Cantonese

Westgate Tango (simplified Chinese: 西门町; traditional Chinese: 西門町; pinyin: Xi men ding) is a 2012 Taiwanese romance drama film starring Dylan Kuo, Amber An, Hong Kong actor Anthony Wong, Denny Tsao, Jett Lee and Japanese director actor Toyoharu Kitamura. Directed and written by notable film critic Wei Wang. This is the feature directorial debut by Wang Wei. The film is set in Taipei's trendy Ximending district, best known for its mix of alternative lifestyles, youth fashion and the antimony of adolescent life, and provides an upbeat story of damaged young people finding their purpose in life. The films upbeat tone may appeal to some, but the complexity of the background is obliterated by stereotypes.

== Plot ==
Heartbroken Jin (Dylan Kuo) believes he will never fall in love again. Ending up in Ximending (the cultural-fashion hub of Taipei) after wandering for 12 years, Jin meets the happy go lucky Moé (Amber An), who resuscitates his heart. At the same time, Jin becomes an apprentice to a fortuneteller named Oracle (Anthony Wong), who is the nexus of a list of quirky characters who reside in Ximending. They include Mommy (Denny Tsao), the self-proclaimed 'Queen' of the district. Ace (Jett Lee), a young punk about town who dreams of becoming an idol singer. Aniki (Toyoharu Kitamura), a tattoo artist and a self-proclaimed Japanese gangster. Seemingly mismatched, these eclectic individual's paths intertwine, inexplicably affecting one another and in turn, the pulse of today's Taipei.

== Cast ==
- Dylan Kuo sa Jin 景淳
- Amber An as Moé 小萌
- Anthony Wong as Oracle 黃秋生
- Denny Tsao as Mommy 雄媽
- Jett Lee as Ace 阿華
- Toyoharu Kitamura as Aniki 阿尼基
