= Freya's Love Songs =

Album by Freya Lim

Studio album 非愛不可。心林凡 by Freya Lim
- Released: 3 August 2007
- Genre: Mandopop
- Language: English
- Label: Linfair Records

Freya Lim chronology
It's All Him 都是他 (2001)	Freya's Love Songs (2007)	Holding Back The Tears 眼淚流回去 (2010)

Freya's Love Songs (Chinese: 非愛不可。心林凡) is the third studio album of Taiwan-born Malaysian Mandopop artist Freya Lim (Chinese: 林凡). It was released on 3 August 2007 by Linfair Records.

While in between albums, Freya was working as a Radio DJ in Best Radio (好事聯播網). One of the programme segment focused on introducing English Oldies and the story behind the songs. Linfair Records hence decided that Freya's next album release should be an English album.

== Track listing ==
No.	Title	Length
1.	"Close to You"	2:51
2.	"Kiss Me"	3:11
3.	"You Light Up My Life"	3:39
4.	"Time After Time"	3:59
5.	"Bizarre Love Triangle"	2:47
6.	"Winter"	5:40
7.	"Foolish Beat"	4:44
8.	"I Miss You"	4:56
9.	"Both Sides Now"	4:38
10.	"Colors of the Wind"	4:27
