= Borrow Your Love =

- Promo poster
- Also known as: Borrow Ur Love, 借用一下你的愛
- 借用一下你的愛
- Genre: Romance
- Written by: Lin Ya Chun 林雅淳
- Directed by: Ke Zheng Ming 柯政銘
- Starring: Dylan Kuo 郭品超; Amanda Chu 朱芯儀; Shi Yi Nan 施易男; Cherry Hsia 夏如芝
- Opening theme: To Meet Again at Unspecified Date 後會無期 by Xu Liang 徐良 & Silence Wong 汪蘇瀧
- Ending theme: Borrow Loved Ones 借用愛的人 by Dylan Kuo 郭品超
- Country of origin: Republic of China (Taiwan)
- Original language: Mandarin
- No. of series: 1
- No. of episodes: 14

Production
- Producer: Sui Ai Peng 隋愛朋
- Production location: Taiwan
- Running time: 90 minutes
- Production companies: Imagery Power Communication Co., Ltd. 意象動力傳播有限公司

Original release
- Network: CTV
- Release: 3 March – 2 June 2013

Borrow Your Love (Traditional Chinese: 借用一下你的愛, Pinyin: Jie Yong Yi Xia Ni De Ai), also known as Borrow Ur Love, is a 2013 Taiwanese romance drama starring Dylan Kuo, Amanda Chu, Shi Yi Nan and Cherry Hsia. The drama is about two people who wanted to set their friends up together but end up falling for each other. Filming began in November 2012 on location in Taiwan and finished in March 2013. The drama began airing on channel CTV on March 3, 2013 every Sunday night at 10:00 PM with episodes re-broadcasting on cable channel CtiTV every following Saturday night at 10:00 PM. It finished airing on June 2, 2013 with 14 episodes total.

== Synopsis ==
Ping An, a blunt girl with a warm personality meets Ye Chen, a cold and reserved guy who has just been released from prison. Their chance encounter leads to misunderstanding and being kidnapped together. But the two pretend to be a couple in order for their friends Li Zi Wen and Xie Xi Le to get together without feeling guilty. In addition Ye Chen helps Ping An uncover her true identity and find her long lost mother.

== Summary ==
Xie Ping An and Xie Xi Le are best friends who grew up together in the orphanage. Not having a sense of security, each sees the other as their only family. Both work as servers at the Qing Cheng mall food court and have a crush on Li Zi Wen, an executive assistant who also works at the same mall. Ping An works part-time at a floral nursery while Xi Le attends university part-time. They might be poor but both are happy with having only each other in their life. Their peaceful lives turns up side down when they encounter Ye Chen and when one of them is possibly the biological daughter of Bai Ming Li, the stern, ruthless and manipulative chairwoman of the Qing Cheng mall.

Ye Chen is a brave and loyal person who took the blame and served an 8-year prison sentence for an accidental murder Zi Wen committed, thinking Zi Wen would take care of his sister Wei Jin, who Zi Wen was dating at that time. On the day that he is released from prison he meets Ping An when saving her from being run over by traffic, they have a misunderstanding and argue because of where he had grabbed her on her body when saving her. Later that same day he encounters the kidnapping of Bai Ming Li orchestrate by her chauffeur in broad daylight, since Ping An got kidnapped too while trying to save Bai Ming Li early, Ye Chen recognizes her and decides to rescue them.

When Ping An and Bai Ming Li are saved, Bai Ming Li offers Ye Chen her business card so she can compensate him for saving her. Ye Chen is not interested and throws away her business card, seeing that Ye Chen is not greedy Bai Ming Li offers him a task for a great reward. She asks him to help find her long lost biological daughter because this is a private matter and he is the only person she can trust. Bai Ming Li cannot trust anyone because she is a ruthless and cold hearted business women who had made many enemies while building her late husband's once small family run supermarket to the huge shopping mall corporation it is now.

Ye Chen traces Bai Ming Li's long lost daughter to Xie Ping An and Xie Xi Le. Both girls are asked to take a DNA test. While waiting for the DNA test results Bai Ming Li receives a phone call from her former chauffeur who was part of her earlier kidnapping telling her he will tell her who is the mastermind of the kidnapping if she gives him a great sum of money, but her former chauffeur dies in what looks like a suicide before she is able to reach him. Knowing that there is someone still out to get her she lies about the DNA results by acknowledging Xi Le as her daughter in order to protect her real biological daughter Ping An. Ye Chen finds out about Bai Ming Li's lie when seeing her many worried reactions towards Ping An, after understanding why she had to lie she asks him to continue working for her as her personal bodyguard and chauffeur. He agrees knowing that the real culprit behind the kidnapping has not been caught.

Li Zi Wen and Ye Chen were best friends when they were younger, he even dated Ye Chen's younger sister Wei Jin. He works as an Executive assistant at the mall and is friendly with all the staff. He likes Ping An because she reminds him of Wei Jin whom he had loved very much. During his college years his family business went bankrupted, both of his parents not being able to face the set back committed suicide. Zi Wen blamed Bai Ming Li's ruthless business dealings with the bankruptcy of his family's business and cause of his parents suicide. Wanting to avenge his parents he cuts Bai Ming Li's car brakes, but Wei Jin finds out and tries to worn Bai Ming Li, but she gets killed when the car is out of control.

Zi Wen has since blamed Bai Ming Li for everything that was taken away from him. Knowing he is no match for Bai Ming Li, he quietly and patiently works by her side as a trusted assistant in order to learn all her underhand business dealing tricks so he can exact revenge on her one day. When news comes out that Xi Le is Bai Ming Li's biological daughter he gives up on his love for Ping An in order to pursue and pretend to love Xi Le so he can carryout his revenge plan.

== Cast ==
=== Main cast ===
- Dylan Kuo 郭品超 as Ye Chen 葉晨

He's brave, tall and handsome. He gets out of prison after serving an 8 year prison term for taking the fall on a crime he didn't commit. The person he cares about the most is his late sister Wei Jin. He has been friends with Li Zi Wen for a long time since Zi Wen use to date his late sister. He meets Xie Ping An when he rescues her from almost getting run over. Due to some misunderstanding between the two they get off on the wrong foot and argue whenever they run into each other. He encounters Bai Ming Li while trying to rescue her and Ping An from a kidnappers. Bai Ming Li seeing how he is not greedy offers him a job as her personal chauffeur and body guard, at first he wasn't interested but Ming Li offered to reward him with a great sum of money.

- Amanda Chu 朱芯儀 as Xie Ping An 謝平安

She's a kind hearted, frugal and courageous girl that stands up for people when she sees injustice. She became an orphan when her father went off to buy food and never returned. She does not know that her father was involve in a traffic accident and died. She and Xie Xi Le grew up together in the orphanage and see each other as best friends and family. She works at the mall food court as a server and delivery girl. She has a crush on Li Zi Wen, but seeing that Xi Le likes him too she gives up on the chance to pursue him and pretends to be a couple with Ye Chen so Xi Le won't feel guilty about pursuing Zi Wen.

- Shi Yi Nan 施易男 as Li Zi Wen 黎子文

He came from a rich family but because his father's business went bankrupt both of his parents committed suicide. He used to date Ye Chen's late sister but she died trying to help him. Ye Chen went to jail and took the blame for an accidental murder he committed. He blames Bai Ming Li for everything that has been taken from him and plans a revenge scheme to destroy her. He likes Ping An because she reminds him of Wei Jin but decides to pretend to love Xi Le in order to carry out his revenge plan on Bai Ming Li.

- Cherry Hsia 夏如芝 as Xie Xi Le 謝喜樂

She grew up with Ping An at the orphanage and see each other as family. She works together with Ping An at the mall food court, but she also attends school part time. Ping An's father took her in when he found her alone on the side of the street on a dark rainy night. She longs to have parents since she never knew who her parents were. She has a crush on Li Zi Wen and is happy when she thinks he likes her too. Bai Ming Li uses her in order to protect her real daughter. Later on she develops a hatred for Ping An because of her paranoid love for Zi Wen and envy jealousy when she finds out Bai Ming Li is not her mother but was only using her.

=== Supporting cast ===
- Allen Chao 趙樹海 as Li Shi Cheng 季世城

He has a long standing hatred for his sister-in-law Bai Ming Li because she became the president of his family's business when his brother died. He feels disrespected and powerless at work because he does not have a say on how the business is run. He is always looking for reasons for Bai Ming Li's downfall. He becomes part of Li Zi Wen revenge plans on Bai Ming Li when Zi Wen purposely leaves confidential documents out in the open for him to see.

- Linda Liu 劉瑞琪 as Bai Ming Li 白明俐

She is the Chairman of Qing Cheng Mall. Her late husband left her in charge of the business because she helped him built the business to what it is now. She is a ruthless business women and uses all kinds of dirty tactics in her business dealings even hiring thugs to threaten those who are against her. Due to the way she deals with business she has made a lot of enemies and she knows they are all out to get her. She has a terminal illness and is left with only less than a year to live, because of her illness she is desperate to find her daughter from her first marriage. She uses and lies to Xie Xi Le that she is her daughter in order to protect her real daughter from her enemies.

- Huang Ke Jing 黃克敬 as Li Lai Sa 季麗莎

Li Shi Cheng's adopted daughter. She is spoiled and ill mannered. She grew up in the same orphanage as Ping An and Xi Le but got adopted in her preteens. She does not like to talk about her past at the orphanage because she is ashamed of who she really is. She bullies Xi Le and hates Ping An because she is envious of their close friendship. She develops an unrequited love for Ye Chen and does all she can to try to break him and Ping An up.

- Chen Qiao Wei 陳喬威 as Li Huo Ying 季霍英

Li Shi Cheng's only son and Li Lai Sa's adopted brother. He likes to flirt with girls by showing them magic tricks. He seems like a typical rich playboy on the outside, but he is actually a kind hearted person. He was originally attracted to Xi Le but starts falling for Ping An when he got to know her better. His father gets him hired at the Qing Cheng mall in order to help him defeat Bai Ming Li. He tends to follow all orders his father and adopted sister gives to him even if he is aware what he is doing isn't right.

- Deng Yun Ting 鄧筠庭 as young Xie Ping An 童年謝平安

She doesn't know her father died in a traffic accident and is optimistic that he will come get her at the orphanage.

- Ric Huang 荒山亮 as Xie Ping An's father 平安父

He loved his ex-wife and daughter dearly. He worked as a lounge singer and raised his daughter alone. Even though they were poor they were very happy. During a rainy night he is accidentally struck by a truck while getting food for his daughter.

- Wang Xiang Han 王湘涵 as Ye Wei Jin 葉瑋真

Ye Chen's sister and Li Zi Wen's past girlfriend. She gets run over and killed by Bai Ming Li's car while trying to help Zi Wen. She passes away while Ye Chen was in jail, he feels regretful that he never got to see her one last time.

- Tie Ke 鐵克 as Blackie 黑仔

Hired thugs that works for Bai Ming Li to do her dirty work. After Bai Ming Li finds her real daughter she decides to no longer associate herself with him. Li Zi Wen later hires him to help plan his revenge on Bai Ming Li.

- Lulu Huang Lu Zi Yin as Supervisor 領班

Ping An and Xi Le's supervisor at the food court. She is mean and be littles Ping An. She likes handsome guys so she has crushes on Ye Chen and Li Zi Wen.

== Soundtrack ==
- To Meet Again at Unspecified Date 後會無期 by Xu Liang 徐良 & Silence Wong 汪蘇瀧
- Borrow Loved Ones 借用愛的人 by Dylan Kuo 郭品超
- 123 Do Not Be Afraid 123別害怕 by Ric Huang 荒山亮
- Forever 天荒地老 by Ric Huang 荒山亮
- A Little Sweet 有點甜 by Silence Wong 汪蘇瀧 & BY2
- After Dark 天黑以後 by Lin Zi Liang 林子良
- Wound 傷口 by Lin Zi Liang 林子良
- Bow 蝴蝶結 by Lin Zi Liang 林子良
- Cycling 騎單車 by Lin Zi Liang 林子良
- Perfect Regret 完美的遺憾 by Ryan Ding 丁衣凡
- Slowly 慢慢的 by Lin Yan Jun 林妍君

== Filming locations ==
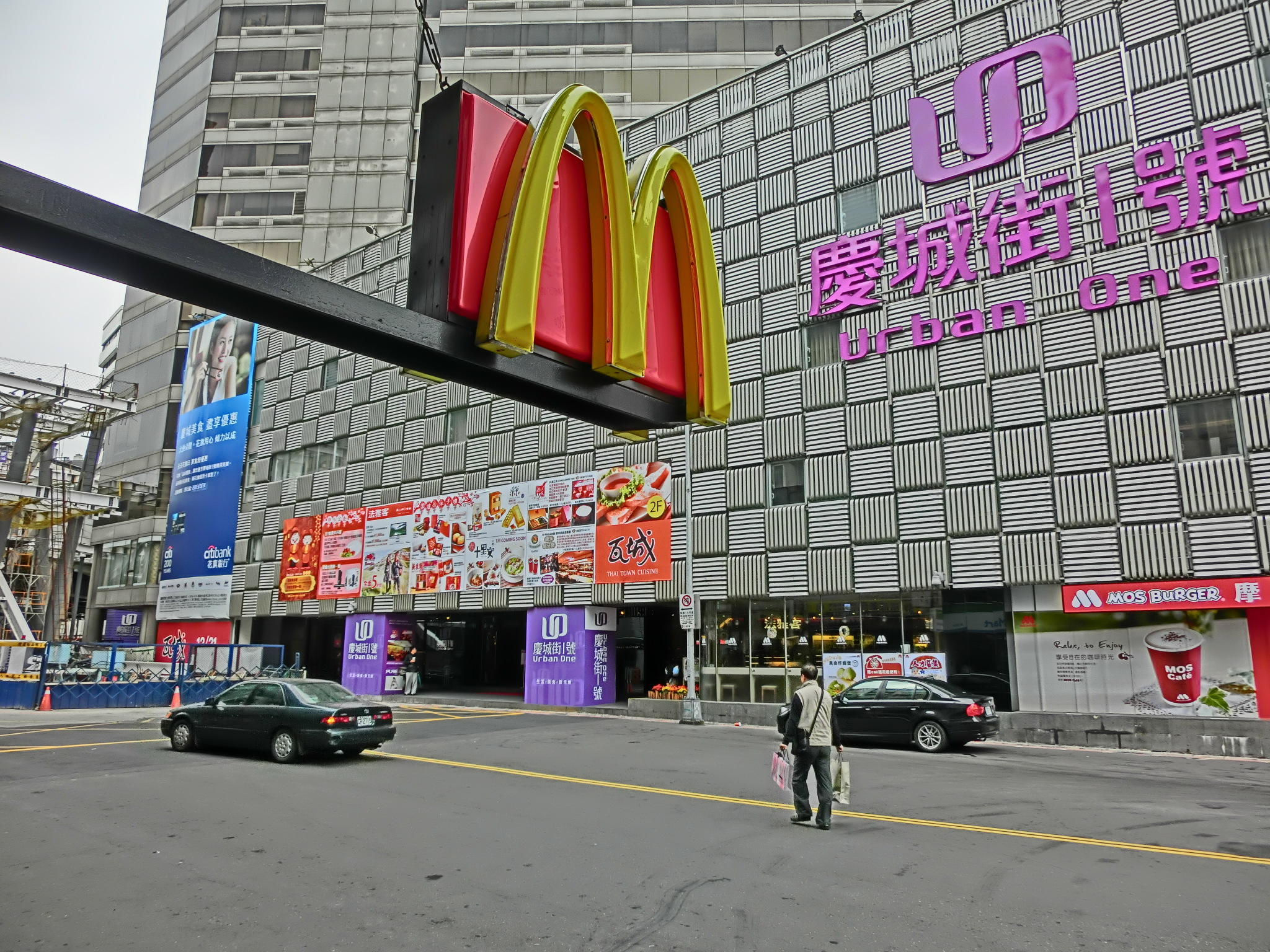
"Urban One" mall.

Majority of filming took place at the "Urban One" mall in the Songshan District of Taipei. Its exterior and interior is depicted as the mall where the main characters work at. The mall's actual food court stood in for the food court of where "Xie Ping An" works at. Filming also took place outsides the mall's exterior and neighboring places around the area. Other filming locations included Ximending District of Taipei. The house that serves as the residence of "Bai Ming Li" is an architecture show piece house called "The Designer's House" located at Yilan County, Taiwan. The same house was previously featured in such dramas as 2006 CTS drama "Miss No Good" and "Hana Kimi". The plant nursery where "Xie Ping An" works at part-time is the "Taipei Garden Mall" located in the Shilin District of Taipei, Taiwan.

- Urban One - No. 1, Qìngchéng Street, Songshan District Taipei City, Taiwan 105
- The Designer's House - No.138 Xiaowei 1st Road Wujie Township, Yilan, Taiwan
- Taipei Garden Mall - No. 18-2, Section 7, Yánpíng North Rd, Shilin District Taipei City, Taiwan 111
- Hannover Equestrian Club - No. 143, Section 7, Chéngdé Rd, Beitou District, Taipei City, Taiwan 11262
- ZEST35 - 111 Taiwan, Taipei City, Shilin District, Zhongshan Road No. 72, Lane 1, Lane 232,
- Shangri-La Leisure Farm - 269, Taiwan, Yilan County, Dongshan Township, Plum Road 168
- Shangri-La Boutique Hotel - No.15, Ln. 13, Xiehe Central Rd., Wujie Township, Yilan County 268, Taiwan
- Ximenjing Japanese Restaurant & Bar 西門靖 - No. 122, 1st Floor, Section 2, Wuchang Street, Wanhua District, Taipei City, Taipei, Taiwan 108
- White House Resort - No.264 Masu Road, Wanli District, New Taipei 20745, Taiwan

== Broadcast ==
Channel	Country/Location	Airing Date	Timeslot	Notes
CTV	Taiwan	March 3, 2013	Sundays 22:00	
CtiTV	Taiwan	March 9, 2013	Saturday 22:00	
TVB J2	Hong Kong	July 12, 2013	Monday to Friday 19:30	
StarHub	Singapore	September 26, 2013	Tuesday to Friday 22:00	
new)tv	Thailand	November 25, 2015	Monday to Friday 00:30	

== Episode ratings ==
Air Date	Episode	Average Ratings	Ranking
March 3, 2013	1	0.58	3
March 10, 2013	2	0.65	3
March 17, 2013	3	0.58	3
March 24, 2013	4	0.61	3
March 31, 2013	5	0.71	3
April 7, 2013	6	0.75	3
April 14, 2013	7	0.78	3
April 21, 2013	8	0.76	3
April 28, 2013	9	0.70	3
May 5, 2013	10	0.73	3
May 12, 2013	11	0.67	3
May 19, 2013	12	0.74	3
May 26, 2013	13	0.87	3
June 2, 2013	14	0.85	3
Average ratings		0.71	-
