= The Outsiders II =

- Promo poster
- Also known as: Fighting Fish 2
- 鬥魚2
- Genre: Romance, Action
- Written by: Lín Ya Chun 林雅淳; Cao Ru Píng 曹如萍
- Directed by: Huo Da Hua 霍达华
- Starring: Dylan Kuo 郭品超; Ady An 安以軒; Show Lo 羅志祥; Michael Zhang 張勛傑
- Opening theme: Grey Space 灰色空間 by Show Lo 羅志祥
- Ending theme: You Say 你說 by Chen Ke Hao 陳科妤
- Country of origin: Republic of China (Taiwan)
- Original language: Mandarin
- No. of series: 2
- No. of episodes: 20

Production
- Executive producers: Ke Yi-qín 柯以勤; Chen Zhi Han 陳芷涵
- Production location: Taiwan
- Running time: 45 minutes
- Production company: Duo Man Ni Productions 多曼尼 Ltd

Original release
- Network: GTV
- Release: 29 September – 1 December 2004

Related
- The Outsiders 鬥魚

The Outsiders II (Traditional Chinese: 鬥魚2, Pinyin: Dou Yu Yi), is a 2004 romance and action Taiwanese drama starring Dylan Kuo, Ady An, Show Lo and Michael Zhang. The drama is a sequel of 2004 "The Outsiders". The storyline backtracks the years Blue Lan's character "Shan Li Jie" is serving a prison sentence so Blue Lan does not appear in this drama. Actor-singer Show Lo, who was not part of the first series is part of the main cast in the second series. The drama began airing on channel GTV on September 9, 2004, every Wednesday nights at 9:00 p.m. It finished airing on December 1, 2004, with 20 episodes total.

Show Lo received a 40th Golden Bell Awards nomination for Best Actor for his role as the undercover police officer Yuan Cheng Lie.

== Synopsis ==
The story backtracks the years not covered in the first series when Shan Li Jie (Blue Lan) was serving a prison sentence.

Yu Yan (Ady An) decides to change her delicate, weak image in order to not be Yu Hao's (Dylan Kuo) burden anymore. Yu Hao is not happy with her transformation, as she has become a different person and not the same girl he feel in love with, but he is unable to stop her in becoming a "big sister" triad. Due to arguments and conflicts between the two they gradually grow apart.

On the other hand, Yu Hao is also facing conflict from his triad boss Xiong Ge (Ken Lo) from the Eagle gang, due to his growing popularity with the other members. Xiong Ge feels that Yu Hao wants to usurp his position as the head of the Eagle gang and causes conflict between Yu Hao and rival gangs. This causes Yu Hao to be faced with a decision, if he should continue to be loyal to his gang or betray them. During this time an undercover police officer, Ah Lie (Show Lo) becomes good friends with him Yu Hao. But he is really there to gather information and destroy the Eagle Gang.

== Cast ==
=== Main cast ===
- Dylan Kuo 郭品超 as Yu Hao 于皓 - Male

Yu Yan's boyfriend and love. He has raised in the ranks in the triad world. His former mentor and triad boss Xiong Ge is out to destroy him because he is afraid Yu Hao has gained too much power within his organization.

- Ady An 安以軒 as Pei Yu Yan/Yan Zi 裴語燕 - Female

Yu Hao's girlfriend and love. Ever since the horrific incident that happened to her in the first series she goes through a drastic change in personality and appearance to no longer make herself a burden for Yu Hao.

- Show Lo 羅志祥 as Yuan Cheng Lie/Ah Lie 袁承烈/阿烈 - Male

Has known Yu Hao when they were younger. Uses their past acquaintance to get close and join Yu Hao's gang, but he is really an undercover police officer sent to infiltrate and shut down the triad gangs.

- Michael Zhang 張勛傑 as Yang Xun Qi 楊勳奇 - Male

Hong Dou's boyfriend. Yu Hao's childhood friend and most trusted subordinate. He follows all orders given to him by Yu Hao diligently without asking questions.

- Joelle Lu 陸明君 as Hong Dou 陸绮红 - Female

Xun Qi's girlfriend. Yu Yan's best friend.

=== Supporting cast ===
- Angus Hsieh 謝承均 as Ah Bao 阿豹 - Male

Originally in the same gang as Yu Hao, Li Jie, and Xun Qi, he later betrays their boss and joins a rival gang.

- Pang Yong Zhi 龐庸之 as Pang Rui Guo 龐瑞國 - Male

He is in a rival gang against Yu Hao, Li Jie, and Xun Qi.

- Carmen Tang 唐以菲 as Hong Lie Lie 洪蕾蕾 - Female

Geng Ji Xiong daughter.

- Xue Yuan Cong 薛渊琮 as Fan Yi Bin 范奕斌 - Male

A coward young man who wants to join the triad gangs because of Hong Lie Lie.

- Zhang Guo Zhu 張榮華 as Senior Official 學務主任 - Male

Lie Lie school director.

- Ken Lo 盧惠光 as Geng Ji Xiong 耿濟雄 - Male

Yu Hao, Li Jie, and Xun Qi's original triad boss. He is unhappy with Yu Hao's growing power in his organization and plots together with Ah Bao to rid of Yu Hao but gets betrayed by Ah Bao in the end.

== Original soundtrack ==
The Outsiders II Original Soundtrack

Soundtrack album by Various artists
- Released: 22 October 2004
- Genre: Mandopop
- Language: Mandarin
- Label: Warner Music Group Taiwan

The Outsiders II Original Soundtrack (CD) (鬥魚2電視原聲帶) was released on October 22, 2004, by various artists under Warner Music Group Taiwan record label. It contains 17 tracks, in which 7 tracks are various instrumental versions of the songs and original classical pieces. The opening theme is track 5 "Grey Space 灰色空間" by Show Lo 羅志祥, while the closing theme is track 2 "You Say 你說" by Chen Ke Hao 陳科好.

=== Track listing ===
No.	Title	Singer(s)	Length
1.	"Used To" (曾經)	Instrumental
2.	"You Say" (你說)	Chen Ke Hao 陳科好
3.	"Promise" (答應)	Dylan Kuo 郭品超
4.	"Lake Junction" (江湖交界)	Instrumental
5.	"Grey Space" (灰色空間)	Show Lo 羅志祥
6.	"Fake Enemy" (假想敵)	Tanya Chua 蔡健雅
7.	"Happiness of Yu Yan" (語燕之樂)	Instrumental
8.	"How To Be Happy" (該如何快樂)	Jenny Yang
9.	"You Said" (你說)	Instrumental
10.	"Song of Life" (生命之歌)	Instrumental
11.	"I Don't Wanna Leave You" (我不想離開你)	Carmen Tang 唐以菲
12.	"Love Is Here" (愛情來了)	Instrumental
13.	"Embrace" (擁抱)	Jiahui Wu 伍家輝
14.	"Because It's You" (張勛傑)	Michael Zhang
15.	"Between Black and White" (黑白之間)	Instrumental
16.	"You've Promised" (黑白之間)	Renée Chen 陳嘉唯
17.	"Promise" (答應)	Instrumental

== Awards and nominations ==
40th Golden Bell Awards (金鐘獎), Taiwan - 2005
Nomination	Category	Result
Show Lo	Best Actor	Nominated
