= Hu Yingzhen =

Taiwanese actress, model, and host

Karen Ying-Chen Hu
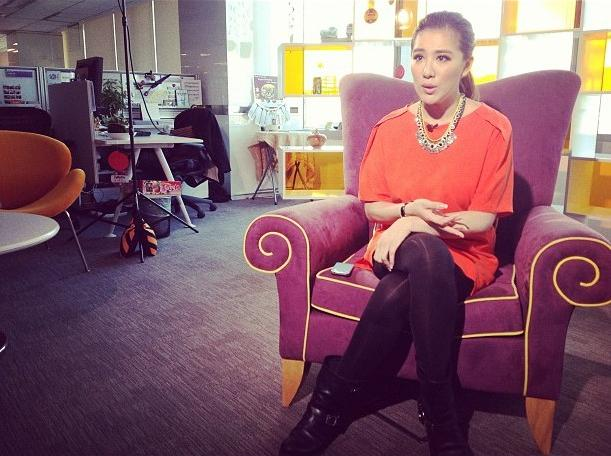
- Born: December 9, 1984 (age 40); Taipei, Taiwan
- Other names: Xiao Zhen
- Occupations: Actress; model; host
- Years active: 2004-present
- Spouse: Li Jinliang (2007–2019)
- Children: 1
- Parent: Hu Gua (father)

Chinese name
- Traditional Chinese: 胡盈禎
Transcriptions
Standard Mandarin
- Hanyu Pinyin: Hu Yingzhen

Karen Ying-Chen Hu (Chinese: 胡盈禎; pinyin: Hú Yíngzhēn; Wade–Giles: Hu^{2} Ying^{2}chen^{1}; born December 9, 1984), also known as Xiao Zhen (Chinese: 小禎), is a Taiwanese actress, model, and host. Her father, Hu Gua, is also a famous host in Taiwan. She is known for her roles in Lucky Days, Boysitter, and The Fierce Wife.

== Personal life ==
Born in Taipei, she attended high school in Switzerland for four years. In 2007, she married plastic surgeon Li Jinliang. However, after multiple extramarital affairs, she filed divorce papers in 2013. They have a daughter.

== Filmography ==
=== Film ===
Year	English Title	Original Title	Role	Notes
2012	The Fierce Wife Final Episode	犀利人妻最終回：幸福男‧不難	Wen Jui-hsuan	

=== Television ===
Year	English Title	Original Title	Role	Notes
2009	Mango Dreamer	流漂子	Chua Beauty	
2010	Lucky Days	第二回合我愛你	Fang Yen-Hsiu	14 episodes
2010-2011	The Fierce Wife	犀利人妻	Wen Jui-hsuan	23 episodes
2011	Happy Sovereign Remedy	幸福萬靈丹	Yan Honey	
2012	Love Forward	嚴蜜	Zhang Ling Li	
2012	Nice to Meet You	向前走向愛走	Ren Zhen	
2012	Long Love Not Married	久戀不婚	He Lijuan	
2012	Lady Maid Maid	愛情女僕	Hao Xin	
2014	Boysitter	俏摩女搶頭婚	Aircraft passenger	Episode #1.1
