= Sonia Sui =

Taiwanese actress, television host and model (born 1980)

- 隋棠
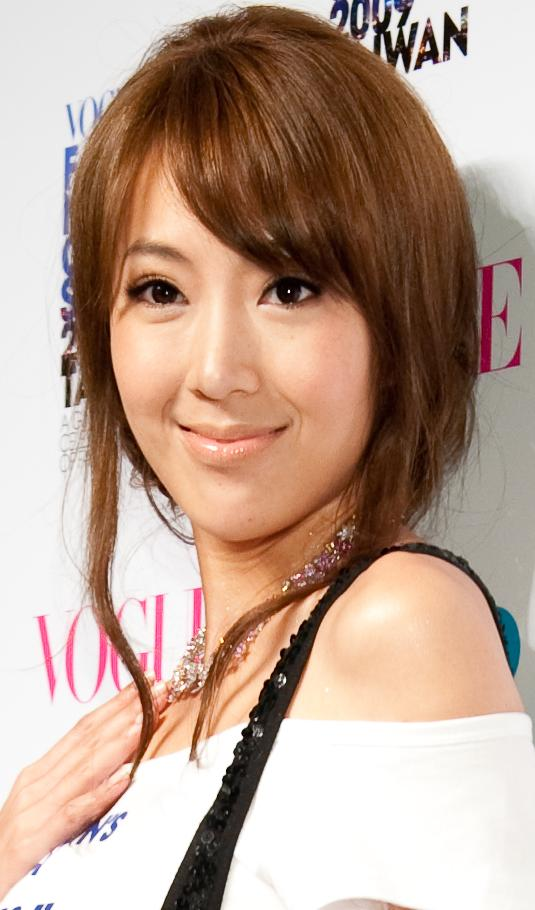
- Born: 22 October 1980 (age 45); Chung Hsing New Village, Nantou County, Taiwan
- Education: University of Winnipeg
- Occupations: Actress, television host, model
- Years active: 2002–present
- Spouse: Tony Hsieh (m. 2015)
- Children: 3
- Website: suitangtang.com

Sonia Sui (Chinese: 隋棠; pinyin: Suí Táng; born 22 October 1980) is a Taiwanese actress, television host and model. She is best known for her role as Hsieh An-chen in the 2010 television series The Fierce Wife.

== Life and career ==
Sui was born on 22 October 1980 in Nantou County, Taiwan.

At the age of 13, Sui was sent to Poland, where she completed her junior high school education in Poznań. She then moved to Winnipeg, Manitoba, Canada where she finished her high school and went to study psychology at University of Winnipeg. Upon completion of the program, Sonia moved back to Taipei and started to pursue a modeling career.

In recent years, Sui has successfully turned to acting and hosting television shows. She starred in a number of television series and films, including the well-received Magicians of Love and The Year of Happiness and Love, as well as earning many endorsement deals. Sui was also the co-host of the Golden Horse Awards ceremony in 2008.

In 2018 she founded her own clothing brand SuiTangTang. In September 2018, she announced her third baby Olie.

== Personal life ==
Sui was in a relationship with How Yao from 2004 to 2012; she then married Tony Hsieh in 2015. She gave birth to a son, Max, on August 30, 2015. Their second child, a daughter named Lucy, was born on February 1, 2017. Their third child was born on December 18, 2018, named Olie.

== Filmography ==
=== Film ===
Year	English title	Original title	Role	Notes
2007	Surf's Up	—N/a	Lani Aliikai	Taiwanese release, voice
2009	Power for Love	為愛發電	Tina	Short film
2010	Toy Story 3	—N/a	Barbie	Taiwanese release, voice
2011	Make Up	命運化妝師	Chen Ting	
2012	When Yesterday Comes	昨日的記憶-迷路	Iris	Segment "Healing"
2012	The Seed	種子	Green	Short film
2012	The Fierce Wife - Final Episode	犀利人妻最終回：幸福男·不難	Hsieh An-chen	
2012	Together	甜·祕密	Lily	
2013	Twelve Nights	十二夜	—N/a	Documentary; As producer
2014	Twa-Tiu-Tiann	大稻埕	A-chun	
2015	Women Who Flirt	撒嬌女人最好命	Hailey	
2015	The Laundryman	青田街一號	A-gu	
2016	Berlin Fairy Tale	柏林童話	Zhang Lili	

=== Television series ===
Year	English title	Original title	Role	Notes
2003	Up on the Stage	舞動奇蹟	Du Jiali	
2003	Love Go Go	爱情来了	Lan Meiqi	
2003	Fly Me to Polaris	星愿	Maggie	
2003	Spicy Teacher	麻辣鮮師	Student	Cameo
2004	The Legend of Speed	極速傳説	Miki	
2004	Love Overcomes Everything	死了都要愛	Xiaoshu	
2005	The Legend of Speed 2	愛戀2000米	Miki	
2005	The Prince Who Turns into a Frog	王子變青蛙	Dai Anfen	Cameo
2006	The Kid from Heaven	天堂來的孩子	Kai Li	
2006	The Magicians of Love	愛情魔髮師	Ye Kelan	
2009	The Year of Happiness and Love	那一年的幸福時光	Huang Kuo-fen	
2009	Black & White	痞子英雄	Lei Mu-sha	
2010	Untold Stories of 1949	大江大海一九四九	Young Soong Ai-ling	
2010	The Fierce Wife	犀利人妻	Hsieh An-chen	
2010	P.S Man	偷心大聖 P.S. 男	Ma Xiaoqian	
2013	The Pursuit of Happiness	愛的生存之道	Chi An-lei	
2014	Mr. Right Wanted	徵婚啟事	Lee Hai-ning	
2015	Women On The Breadfruit Tree	長在麵包樹上的女人	Song Dizhi	
2018	Tree In The River	动物系恋人啊	Fen Ni	
2023	Lovely Villain	親愛壞蛋	Han Zhenzhen	
2026	Agent from Above	乩身	Chiang Hua-chih	

=== Variety show ===
Network	English title	Original title	Notes
TLC	Lady in the House	玩美女人窩	Host
MTV Taiwan	Fashion Guide	愛漂亮	Host
CTS/Azio TV	Miss Love To Travel	小姐愛旅行	Host
CTS	Woman Travel	Woman愛旅行	Host
CTi Variety	Miss Traveler	空姐愛旅行	Host

=== Music video ===
Artist	Song title
Rynn Lim	"Melody"
Style	"In Between"
Tiger Hu	"18 Restricted"
Alan Ko	"Don't Worry"
JJ Lin	"Tales of the Red Cliff"
Shin	"The Lonely Fire"
Thongchai McIntyre	"Why The Tears"
Suming	"Don't Be So Quick to Say You Love Me When You Are in Dulan"
Where Chou	"Lonely City"
Dwagie	"FaceBook"
Hsiao Huang-chi	"The Most Beautiful Flower"

== Published works ==
- Sui, Sonia (2007). Sonia Sui's Eastern Europe Landscape. Taipei: Kate Publishing. ISBN 9789868349513.

== Awards and nominations ==
Year	Award	Category	Nominated work	Result
2011	46th Golden Bell Awards	Best Leading Actress in a Television Series	The Fierce Wife	Nominated
2013	50th Golden Horse Awards	Best Original Film Song	"If Love Songs Were All the Same" from Together (lyrics)	Nominated
