= The Outsiders (Taiwanese TV series) =

- Promo poster
- Also known as: Fighting Fish
- 鬥魚
- Genre: Romance; Action
- Written by: Lín Ya Chun; Cao Ru Píng
- Directed by: Ke Han Chen
- Starring: Dylan Kuo; Ady An; Blue Lan; Michael Zhang
- Opening theme: "Unfair" by Jenny Yang
- Ending theme: "Lydia" by F.I.R
- Country of origin: Taiwan
- Original language: Mandarin
- No. of series: 2
- No. of episodes: 20

Production
- Executive producers: Ke Yi-qín; Chen Zhi Han
- Production location: Taiwan
- Running time: 45 minutes
- Production company: Duo Man Ni Productions

Original release
- Network: GTV
- Release: 4 April – 22 August 2004

Related
- The Outsiders II

The Outsiders (Traditional Chinese: 鬥魚; Pinyin: Dou Yu; meaning "Fighting Fish") is a 2004 Taiwanese romance and action series starring then newcomers Dylan Kuo, Ady An, Blue Lan and Michael Zhang. The drama is often referred to as the Taiwanese version of the popular Hong Kong film series Young and Dangerous which is about the stories of triad gangs. The drama is Dylan Kuo's first lead role. Prior to the role, he was a popular model who only had bit cameo roles in dramas. The drama began airing on channel GTV on 4 April 2004 on Sunday nights at 9:00 p.m. It finished airing on 22 August 2004 with 20 episodes total.

A sequel, The Outsiders II, was produced and aired in the later part of 2004.

== Synopsis ==
Three sworn brothers, Yu Hao (Dylan Kuo), Shan Zi (Blue Lan), and Yang Xiong Qi (Michael Zhang), that are delinquents, grew up together fighting local neighborhood rivals. Although they are not triad gangs, they make enemies with them when they offend some of their members. Yu Hao who is considered the leader of the three falls for good girl Xiao Yan Zi (Ady An). Yan Zi comes from a well to do family and has been taking piano lessons since she was young hoping to become a pianist. Yan Zi runs into a bloodied Yu Hao in the streets and saves him. Yu Hao, who has always been in love with Yan Zi, uses this chance encounter between the two to break the ice and chase after Yan Zi but the three sworn brothers end up joining triad gangs when they have to protect Yan Zi.

== Cast ==
=== Main cast ===
- Dylan Kuo as Yu Hao - Male age 19

His mother abandoned him when he was little. Lonely and arrogant personality but toward his buddies, he is extremely loyal. He, who seems to be cold and ruthless, has deep feelings towards Yu Yan. Even though the buddies by his side and the gang's leader advises him not to take her along by his side and mess things up, yet Hao won't listen. For this, he even goes so far as gets into conflicts with Li Jie time and again.

- Ady An as Pei Yu Yan / Yan Zi - Female age 17

Yu Yan grew up in pure and simple environment. She is a second year student at Ying Da High School and a budding pianist. Elegant and delicate appearance, because her name has the character "Yan", therefore, the students give her the nickname of Xiao Yan Zi or Small Swallow. She is innocent and naive toward the affairs of the world. Yet all of this changes when she accidentally meets up Yu Hao. She regards love as the way of kindling life.

- Blue Lan as Shan Li Jie - Male age 19

Adoptive son of Geng Ji Xiong. Intelligent and cool-headed personality, a character who acts the image of a military expert. For the matter on Yu Yan, he urges Yu Hao time and again. When Yu Hao gets bullied and ruined a big event because of Yu Yan, causing one of their buddies to be snatched away by the slip of a piece of paper, Dan Zi couldn't stand it any longer and separated with Yu Hao, saying that they will no longer be acquainted with one another. But when Yan Zi left because of him and got trampled on when she didn't have any protection, Dan Zi returned again.

- Michael Zhang as Yang Xun Qi - Male age 19

Good buddies with Yu Hao and Li Jie since young. With regards to Hao, he obeys him to the extreme. Rash and frank personality. Thinks himself as carefree and unrestrained, he constantly changes girlfriends to show the difference of style between him and his buddies. Later he becomes a couple with Hong Dou and the two of them are always fighting around all day long.

- Joelle Lu as Hong Dou - Female age 17

Second year student at Ying Da High School, vicious personality. She was jealous and hated Yan Zi at first because of Yu Hao interest in Yan Zi, she would always cause trouble for Yan Zi. After Yan Zi and Yu Hao became an official couple she lost interest on everything that mattered to her and would speak without thinking. She gradually comes to accept Yan Zi as a friend after getting to know her better. She later becomes a couple with Xun Qi.

=== Supporting cast ===
- Queenie Tai as Shao Xiao Die - Female

Yu Hao first meets her, when she is 17 years old. Due to her father's gambling debts to Zhuang Ju Kuan, Xiao Die is forced to work at a motel as an hostess. She meets Yu Hao the first day she is at the motel, because of her damsel in distress appearance Yu Hao saves her from working as an hostess at the motel. Xiao Die has been bewildered and enchanted by Yu Hao heroic gesture ever since.

- Pang Yong Zhi as Pang Rui Guo - Male

He is in a rival gang against Yu Hao, Li Jie, and Xun Qi.

- Angus Hsieh as Ah Bao - Male

Originally in the same gang as Yu Hao, Li Jie, and Xun Qi, he later betrays their boss and joins a rival gang.

- Tan Ai-chen as Grandma - Female

Yu Hao's grandmother. She lives in an elderly nursing home. Yu Hao visits her every week.

- Ken Lo as Geng Ji Xiong - Male

Yu Hao, Li Jie, and Xun Qi's original triad boss. He is unhappy with Yu Hao's growing power in his organization and plots together with Ah Bao to rid of Yu Hao but gets betrayed by Ah Bao in the end.

== Original soundtrack ==
The Outsiders Original Soundtrack

Soundtrack album by Various artists
- Released: 9 March 2004
- Genre: Mandopop
- Language: Mandarin
- Label: Warner Music Group Taiwan

The Outsiders Original Soundtrack (CD) (鬥魚電視原聲帶) was released on 9 March 2004 by various artists under Warner Music Group Taiwan record label. It contains 16 tracks, in which 7 tracks are various instrumental versions of the songs and original classical pieces. The opening theme is track 1 "Unfair 不公平" by Jenny Yang 蕭賀碩, while the closing theme is track 15 "Lydia" by F.I.R.

=== Track listing ===
| No. | Title | Singer(s) | Length |
|---|---|---|---|
| 1. | "Unfair" (不公平) | Jenny Yang 蕭賀碩 | 4:02 |
| 2. | "Breathe Again" | Juwita Suwito | 3:53 |
| 3. | "Chopin Waltz Op64 No.1" (蕭邦華爾滋 Waltz 64 No.1) | Instrumental | 1:51 |
| 4. | "Till The End" | Will David 陳達偉 | 3:56 |
| 5. | "Bed Time Story" | Will David 陳達偉 | 3:35 |
| 6. | "The Outsiders Song" (鬥魚之歌) | Instrumental | 2:42 |
| 7. | "Give Up" (放棄) | Dylan Kuo 郭品超 | 4:57 |
| 8. | "Unfair" (不公平) | Instrumental | 2:55 |
| 9. | "Childhood" (童年往事) | Chin Tsai 蔡琴 | 3:56 |
| 10. | "Lydia" | Instrumental | 3:54 |
| 11. | "Unfair" (不公平) | Ady An 安以軒 | 2:45 |
| 12. | "Bed Time Story" | Instrumental | 3:34 |
| 13. | "Give Up" (放棄) | Instrumental | 3:40 |
| 14. | "My One And Only" (我的二分之一) | Jiahui Wu 伍家輝 | 4:34 |
| 15. | "Moment of Departing" (蕭邦離別曲) | Instrumental | 2:12 |
| 16. | "Lydia" | F.I.R | 3:59 |

== Publications ==
The Outsiders Photo Album (鬥魚電視寫真書)
- Author: Gala Television 八大電視台
- Genre: photobook
- Published: 2004 Cite publishing Group 商周出版
- Publication place: Taiwan
- Media type: Print Paperback
- Pages: 128
- ISBN: 9789861241203

A 128-page paperback cover photo book was published detailing behind the scenes and production of the drama.

- 4 June 2004 : The Outsiders Photo Album (鬥魚電視寫真書) - ISBN 9789861241203 Cite publishing Group 商周出版
