= Amanda Chu =

Taiwanese actress

- 朱芯儀
- Born: Chu Hsin-yi; 8 March 1986 (age 39); Taiwan
- Spouse: Wesley Chia
- Children: 2
- Awards: Golden Bell Award for Best Supporting Actress

Amanda Chu (Chinese: 朱芯儀; born 8 March 1986) is a Taiwanese actress. She married Wesley Chia in 2011. Later that year, she won the Golden Bell Award for Best Supporting Actress.

== Selected filmography ==
- My Queen (2009)
- Autumn's Concerto (2009–2010)
- The Fierce Wife (2010–2011)
- Borrow Your Love (2013)
- Mr. Right Wanted (2014)
