= Queen's (TV series) =

- Promotional poster
- Genre: Romance; Comedy; School
- Starring: Tang Zhen Gang; Joelle Lu; Amanda Zhou; Gong Ji An; Shatina Chen
- Opening theme: Just Be My Love by Sun Ho (何耀珊)
- Ending theme: Zuo Ni De Gong Zhu (做你的公主) by Sun Ho (何耀珊)
- Country of origin: Taiwan
- Original language: Mandarin
- No. of episodes: 13 Episodes

Production
- Production location: Taiwan

Original release
- Network: CTS
- Release: 6 March – 22 March 2007

Queen's (Chinese: 至尊玻璃鞋; pinyin: Zhì Zūn Bō Li Xié), also known as Queen's Glass Slipper, is a 2007 Taiwanese romantic comedy television series starring Tang Zhen Gang and Joelle Lu. It started to air on March 3, 2007. It is based on the Korean comic series Queen's (퀸즈) by Ha Sung-Hyen (하성현).

== Synopsis ==
Tie Xiong has been in love with his best friend Cai Ke Er since the first day he set eyes on her. Cai Ke Er is a girl with an obsession with Anime and Manga and also dreams of designing costumes for Cosplay. In hopes of winning Ke Er's heart, Tie Xiong becomes what he thinks is Ke Er's ideal man... cute, friendly, good at cooking and sewing, not to mention... Ke Er's cross-dressing cosplay model code-named "Saber"!

But who would have known that what Ke Er really wanted wasn't a cute and cuddly at all... but an athletic, sweaty, ill-tempered basketball player, Jin Yong Jun. Tie Xiong, being somewhat devastated, sets out to become all and more of what Ke Er wants... and finds some added help when he picks up a comic book titled: "The Real Man".

== Cast ==
- Tang Zhen Gang as Tie Xiong
- Joelle Lu as Lin Fu Nan
- Amanda Cou as Cai Ke Er
- Andy Gong as Jin Yong Jun
- Shatina Chen as Sun Ya Ying
- Michael Zhang as Zhuang Ren He
- Renzo Liu as Tie Xiong's father
- Lin Mei-hsiu as Tie Xiong's mother
- Gina Lin as Tie Xiong's eldest sister
- Wei Ru (as Tie Xiong's second sister
- Shen Dong Jing as Wu Rong En
- Liu Er Jin as School Dean
- Weber Yang as General manager secretary (cameo)
