= Mr. Right Wanted =

2014 Taiwanese television series

- Promo poster
- 徵婚啟事
- Genre: Comedy; Romance
- Written by: Essay Liu 劉梓潔; Wang Li Wen 王莉雯; Tsai Yi He 蔡顗禾; Zhang Ying Min 張英珉
- Directed by: Lien Yi-chi 連奕琦
- Starring: Sonia Sui; Christopher Lee; Kuo Shu-yao; Jerry Huang; Hans Chung 鍾承翰; Chang Shao Huai 張少懷; Emerson Tsai
- Opening theme: No Sincerity No Love 無誠勿愛 by 831 八三夭
- Ending theme: What Once Was Lost, Now Is Found 半婚迷 by Shi Shi 孫盛希
- Country of origin: Taiwan
- Original language: Mandarin
- No. of seasons: 1
- No. of episodes: 20

Production
- Executive producers: Pan Yi Qun 潘逸群; Fang Ke Ren 方可人
- Producer: Zhang Shu Yuan 張淑媛
- Production location: Taiwan
- Camera setup: Multi camera
- Running time: 60 minutes
- Production company: UDN Productions 聯合互動傳播股份有限公司

Original release
- Network: TTV; GTV
- Release: 7 November 2014 – 9 January 2015

Related
- Apple in Your Eye; The New World 新世界; The Personals

Mr. Right Wanted (Chinese: 徵婚啟事; pinyin: zheng hun qi shi; literally "Marriage Wanted") is a 2014 Taiwanese comedy, romance television series produced by UDN Productions, starring Sonia Sui, Christopher Lee, Kuo Shu-yao, Jerry Huang, Hans Chung, Chang Shao Huai, and Emerson Tsai. Filming began on December 23, 2013, and finished on June 7, 2014. First original broadcast began November 7, 2014 on TTV channel, airing on Friday nights from 10:00-12:00 pm.

== Synopsis ==
When a woman tackles online dating, is it for work, is it to get back at her ex-boyfriend, or simply to fill a void in her life? Li Hai Ning (Sonia Sui) is a 32-year-old editor-in-chief of a publishing company who is struggling to find a bestseller. Fang Cheng Hao (Jerry Huang), Hai Ning's boyfriend of nine years, is the only author doing well at her company but even his book sales have begun to stagnate. As Hai Ning is preparing for Cheng Hao's new book, she discovers some major misdeeds that he has done and Hai Ning becomes enraged. Leaving him, Hai Ning also decides to write the new book herself – a book about online dating and marriage – with a simple online ad that states: “Female, 32 years old. Looking for men who are upright, kind and willing to communicate. Hoping to be friends first before marriage.” As Hai Ning begins to meet with an endless stream of potential suitors and then meets Benjamin (Christopher Lee), will he help Hai Ning finish her experiment and the book?

== Cast ==
=== Main cast ===
- Sonia Sui as Li Hai Ning 李海寧
- Christopher Lee as Lun Zhe Ming (Benjamin) 倫哲明（Banjamin）
- Kuo Shu-yao as Tian Xin 田欣
- Jerry Huang as Fang Cheng Hao 方成皓
- Hans Chung 鍾承翰 as He Zhong Wen 何仲文
- Chang Shao-huai 張少懷 as Mao Zhen Yu (Yu Zhou) 毛振宇（宇宙）
- Emerson Tsai as Zhang Jia Qiang (Xiao Qiang) 張家強（小強）

=== Supporting cast ===
- Kao Meng-chieh 高盟傑 as Xie Jin Fa (Ah Fa) 謝晉發（阿發）
- Dai Ruo Mei 戴若梅 as Zhang Mei Feng (Ah Feng) 張美鳳（阿鳳）
- Fang Jing 方靖 as Wen Bei Si (Bei Bei) 溫蓓思（貝貝）
- Debbie Huang 黃荻鈞 as Liu Ya Zhu 柳雅竹

=== Extended cast ===
- Patty Wu 吳怡霈 as Pei Pei 佩佩
- He Man Ning 何曼寧 as General Manager of Star Publishing
- Huang Yan Bo 黃彥博 as Tian Tian 田天
- Cheng Cheng-chun 程政鈞 as Tian Xin and Tian Tian's father
- Liang You-nan 梁又南 as Tian Xin and Tian Tian's mother
- Lin Zhi Yi 林致毅 as Pei Pei's husband
- Chen Wei Min 陳偉民 as second-hand bookstore owner
- Tsai Jia Yin 蔡嘉茵 as job applicant
- Qian Wan Jing 錢婉靜 as job applicant
- Liang Ya Qing 梁亞青 as job applicant
- Chen Xiu Ying 程秀瑛 as Mao Zhen Yu's mother
- Wang De Sheng 王德生 as Mao Zhen Yu's father
- Lin Hong Ru 林鴻儒 as snack bar owner
- Xu Yi Xin 許義昕 as violinist
- Yen Yi-wen 嚴藝文 as Qiu Xin Yin (Xiao Qiu) 邱馨芸（小邱）
- Aviis Zhong 鍾瑤 as Paul's ex-girlfriend
- Amiya Lee 李律 as Paul's junior schoolmate
- Fu Zi Xuan 傅子瑄 as female military instructor
- Gao Tian Fa 高天發 as boss of debt collection company
- Helena Hsu 許乃涵 as Zhang Jia Qi (Xiao Qi) 張佳琪（小琪）
- Zheng Zhong Min 鄭仲珉 as bartender
- Chen Pin Chun 陳品淳 as Xu Tian Ming's late wife
- Wu Shi Yang 吳世陽 as Mr. Lun's butler
- Zhang Yi De 張一德 as Mr. Lun's chauffeur
- Guan Jin Zong 管謹宗 as Director Ye
- Amanda as Adele
- Chen Jian Kai 陳建凱 as copyright agent
- Gordon Yang 楊達敬 as Yang Da Jing 楊達敬（Gordon）(voice only) / Xu Lei's senior
- Chen Zeng Liang 陳增良 / Ke Hong Zhi 柯泓志 (voice only) as real Sun Guo Fu 孫國復
- Tatyana as Lena
- Liu Guan Ting 劉冠廷 as Jian Si (Kenji) 健司（Kenji）
- Sun Ruei 孫睿 as Kenji's wife
- Li Li Hao 李笠豪 as boxing match competitor
- Wu Zhen Ya 吳震亞 as boxing match referee
- Qiu Chun Fu 邱春福 as Rocky's father
- Wu Bi Lian 吳碧蓮 as Rocky's mother
- Zhang Wen Song 張文松 as Director Xu
- Huang Xiang Yu 黃湘郁 as Xu Tai 徐太
- Chang Chia-hui 張家慧 as Ye Xiao Lin 葉曉琳
- Qian Xiao Li 錢曉麗 as Anna 安娜
- Wang En De 王恩德 as producer
- Feng Wei 馮薇 as spa hotel staff
- Kenji Chen 陳子胤 as wedding shop employee
- Lang Tsu-yun 郎祖筠 as Hao Bi Jiao 郝碧嬌
- Lin Dong Xu 林東緒 as Hao Bi Jiao's boyfriend
- Zhang Yu Huan 張語歡 as Xiao Ma's sister
- Huang Yu Ting 黃鈺婷 as wedding shop employee
- Chu De-kang 朱德剛 as priest
- Chen Wan Hao 陳萬號 as restaurant owner
- Huang Yu Qing 黃玉麒 as lottery line owner
- Li Min Jie 李旻潔 as hospital volunteer
- Li Jun Sheng 李俊陞 as hospital volunteer
- Aggie Hsieh 謝沛恩 as Xiao Lu 小綠
- Lu Fu Ling 呂馥伶 as Mickey
- Li Pei Xuan 李姵璇 as drugs buyer
- Zhang Wei Ling 張瑋玲 as You Xin 宥心
- Yu Yue Ru 余月如 as motel front desk clerk
- Zhuo Fang Qi 卓芳琦 as school student
- Lin Xu Fan 林栩帆 as Xiao Qiang's coworker
- Wan Zong Yu 萬宗瑜 as Xiao Qiang's coworker
- Duan Zheng Ping 段正平 as physician
- Esther Yang 陽詠存 as Li Yi Ping 李依萍
- Prince Star (aka Nick Yen) 星星王子 as astrology expert
- Zhuang Yi Ting 莊貽婷 as restaurant waiter
- Zhou Si Ting 周思廷 as passenger
- Chen Yu-shan 陳玉珊 as thief
- Ding Pei 丁霈 as Fiona
- Xu Yi Shao 許逸紹 as bicycle courier manager
- Amanda Chu 朱芯儀 as Wei Wei 薇薇
- Si Ta Fan 斯塔凡 as copyright agent
- Wang Han Zhe 王漢哲 as Lei Ti Sha 蕾緹莎（Laetitia Huggings）
- Shi Shang You 史尚右 as Taiwan broker
- Hong Yun Zhu 洪韵筑 as translator
- Kerr Hsu 許時豪 as Rui Huan's college friend
- Su Ting Hui 蘇庭卉 as Dr. Lee
- Wang Han Zhe 王漢哲 as Dr. Lee's assistant
- Bebe Chang 杜姸 as model of Chuan Bo Gong Si
- Lien Yi-chi 連奕琦 as director of Chuan Bo Gong Si
- Li Jia Heng 李佳衡 as 有詞美少女
- Yang Ming 楊閔 as Lin Yun (Teacher Lin) 林韻（林老師）
- Wu Ying Xuan 吳映軒 as household registration office staff
- Ma Jing Yi 馬敬宜 as Hai Ning's roommate
- Yang Qian Yao 楊千瑤 as Hai Ning's roommate
- Wang Jing Jiang 王靖江 as second-hand bookstore owner
- Cui Ruo Qiang 崔若強 as obstetricians
- Yu Yuan Long 余元竉 as Ah Feng's husband

=== Cameos ===
- Alex Ko 柯叔元 as Zhao Pei Nian 趙培年（Alex Chao）
- Ma Nien-hsien 馬念先 as Paul 保羅
- Wang Mong-lin 王夢麟 as Xu Tian Ming 許天鳴
- Lai Pei-hsia 賴佩霞 as Sun Guo Fu 孫國復
- Huang Shang-ho 黃尚禾 as Xiang Yin Zheng 向銀正（Rocky）
- Sphinx Ting 丁春誠 as Pei Xin Wei (Xiao Shuai) 裴信緯（小帥）
- Sunny Wang 王陽明 as Xiao Ma 小馬
- Bryan Chang as Lucifer 路西法
- Chris Wu 吳慷仁 as Xu Lei 徐磊
- Vince Kao 高英軒 as Liao Song Shan 廖松山
- Michio Hayashida 米七偶 as Haruo Sato / Zuo Teng Chun Fu (in Chinese) 佐藤春夫
- Yukihiko Kageyama as Masahiko Sato / Zuo Teng Zhen Yan (in Chinese) 佐藤真彥
- Duncan Chow 周群達 as Jia Rui Huan 賈瑞寰
- Wu Pong-fong 吳朋奉 as Liang Kai Ming 梁開明
- Chin Shih-chieh 金士傑 as Yu Wen 余文
- Chien Te-men 乾德門 as Gu Shi Yong 古時雍

== Soundtrack ==
Mr. Right Wanted Original TV Soundtrack (OST)

Soundtrack album by Various artists
- Released: 5 December 2014
- Genre: Mandopop
- Language: Mandarin
- Label: Rock Records

Mr. Right Wanted Original TV Soundtrack (OST) (徵婚啟事 電視原聲帶) was released on December 5, 2014, by various artists under Rock Records. It contains 16 tracks total, in which 4 songs are various instrumental versions of the songs. The opening theme is track 1 "No Sincerity No Love 無誠勿愛" by 831 八三夭, while the closing theme is track 2 "What Once Was Lost, Now Is Found 半婚迷" by Shi Shi 孫盛希.

=== Track listing ===
No.	Title	Singer(s)	Length
1.	"No Sincerity No Love" (無誠勿愛)	831 八三夭	3:37
2.	"What Once Was Lost, Now Is Found" (半婚迷)	Shi Shi 孫盛希	4:23
3.	"Forgiving Is Not Good" (原諒不美好)	Yisa Yu 郁可唯	3:58
4.	"Yes, I Do"	Shi Shi 孫盛希	3:45
5.	"What Once Was Lost, Now Is Found - Jazz ver." (所以我繼續聽著爵士對婚姻著迷 (半婚迷爵士版 - 配樂))	Instrumental	2:51
6.	"Innocent" (天真)	Alex To 杜德偉	4:04
7.	"Suddenly" (忽然之間)	Karen Mok 莫文蔚	3:21
8.	"Never Let You Be Alone" (不再讓你孤單)	Bobby Chen 陳昇	5:33
9.	"No Sincerity No Love - Tenderness ver." (無誠，就請勿打擾好女孩們 (無誠勿愛柔情版 - 配樂))	Instrumental	3:01
10.	"Love Me, Don’t Go" (愛我別走)	A-Yue Chang	4:44
11.	"Love-ing" (戀愛 ing)	Mayday 五月天	2:49
12.	"No Sincerity No Love - Playful ver." (俗氣的美，還挺俏皮的 (無誠勿愛俏皮版 - 配樂))	Instrumental	2:55
13.	"A Story Teller" (有故事的人)	Emil Chau 周華健	4:38
14.	"Not Long Ago" (從前)	Wan Fang 萬芳	5:08
15.	"Dearest" (最愛)	Sylvia Chang 張艾嘉	4:43
16.	"What Once Was Lost, Now Is Found - Piano ver." (人，為什麼要結婚 ? (半婚迷鋼琴版 - 配樂))	Instrumental	3:06

Songs not featured on the official soundtrack album.

- Sleep by Grayshot

== Broadcast ==
Network	Country	Airing Date	Timeslot
TTV	Taiwan	November 7, 2014	Friday 10:00-12:00 pm (2 episodes back to back)
GTV	Taiwan	November 8, 2014	Saturday 10:00-12:00 pm (2 episodes back to back)
Channel U	Singapore	November 23, 2014	Sunday 7:00-9:00 pm (2 episodes back to back)
Astro Shuang Xing	Malaysia	February 9, 2015	Sunday to Thursday 4:00-5:00 pm
Astro AEC	Malaysia	August 10, 2015	Monday to Friday 4:00-5:00 pm

== Episode ratings ==
Competing dramas on rival channels airing at the same time slot were:
- FTV - Justice Heroes
- SET Taiwan - Our Mother
- SET Metro - Aim High

Air Date	Episode	Episode Title	Average Ratings	Rank
Nov 7, 2014	1	Betray 背叛	0.78	4
Nov 7, 2014	2	Camouflage 偽裝	0.78	4
Nov 14, 2014	3	Courage 勇氣	0.75	4
Nov 14, 2014	4	Detached 抽離	0.75	4
Nov 21, 2014	5	Bear 承擔	0.75	4
Nov 21, 2014	6	The Only 唯一	0.75	4
Nov 28, 2014	7	Backup 備份	1.07	3
Nov 28, 2014	8	Responsibility 責任	1.07	3
Dec 5, 2014	9	Revenge 復仇	0.62	4
Dec 5, 2014	10	Accept 接受	0.62	4
Dec 12, 2014	11	Perfect 完美	0.66	4
Dec 12, 2014	12	Instant 瞬間	0.66	4
Dec 19, 2014	13	Substitute 替代	0.86	4
Dec 19, 2014	14	Destiny 命運	0.86	4
Dec 26, 2014	15	Enthusiasm 激情	--	4
Dec 26, 2014	16	Missed 錯過	--	4
Jan 2, 2015	17	First Mind 初衷	--	4
Jan 2, 2015	18	Admits 坦承	--	4
Jan 9, 2015	19	Condition 條件	--	4
Jan 9, 2015	20	Believe 相信	--	4
Average ratings			0.77	

== Awards and nominations ==
Year	Ceremony	Category	Nominee	Result
2015	50th Annual Golden Bell Awards	Best Supporting Actor	Chang Shao Huai	Nominated
2015	50th Annual Golden Bell Awards	Best Lighting	Xu Shi Ming	Nominated
