= A-Sun (singer) =

Taiwanese singer

- Born: Huang Yen-lin; 28 February 1975; Yunlin County, Taiwan
- Died: 6 April 2009 (aged 34); Xindian, Taipei County, Taiwan
- Occupation: Singer-songwriter
- Years active: 2002–2008

Chinese name
- Traditional Chinese: 黃嬿璘
- Simplified Chinese: 黄嬿璘
Transcriptions
Standard Mandarin
- Hanyu Pinyin: Huáng Yànlín

Alternative Chinese name
- Chinese: 阿桑
- Literal meaning: Judy Huang
Transcriptions
Standard Mandarin
- Hanyu Pinyin: Ā Sāng
- Musical career
- Also known as: A-Sang or Ah-Sang; Ah-sun; A-San or Ah-San; Judy Huang
- Labels: HIM International Music

Huang Yen-lin (28 February 1975 – 6 April 2009), better known by her stage name Ah Sang , A-Sang, or A-Sun (阿桑, a slang term for "old woman" in Taiwanese Hokkien), was a Taiwanese Mandopop singer-songwriter. She died in 2009 from breast cancer, aged 34.

== Career ==
A-Sun began her career by singing at pubs. She gained more widespread attention when she sang the closing song of the Taiwan idol TV series Rosebush's Love. She also released a successful cover of "Ji Mo Zai Chang Ge", originated by Michael Cretu under the title "Moonlight Flower".

She released two albums, both of which were well-received.

== Personal life ==
A-Sun was diagnosed with breast cancer in October 2008, after falling ill at a performance. Although she underwent treatment, the cancer later spread to her lungs and liver. She died on 6 April 2009.

== Discography ==
Studio albums

- 2003 Love Hurts (受了點傷)
- 2005 For the Lonely... (寂寞在唱歌)

Soundtracks and theme songs

TV series featuring her songs include:

- The Rose (2003 Taiwanese series)
- Chinese Paladin (2005 Chinese series)
- The Hospital (2006 Taiwanese series)
- Justice Bao (2010-2012 Chinese series) - the ending theme song of Season 2 (2011) was written by her, and sung by her friend Shane Chang after her death.

== Awards and nominations ==
- 2004 15th Golden Melody Awards
  - Nominated - Best New Artist, Love Hurts
