= Dylan Kuo =

Taiwanese actor and singer (born 1977)

- Born: 8 June 1977 (age 49); Taipei, Taiwan
- Education: Taipei University of Marine Technology (BS)
- Occupations: Actor; singer; model
- Years active: 2003–present
- Musical career
- Also known as: Kuo Pin-chao; Guo Pinchao; Irons Kwok
- Genres: Mandopop
- Instrument: Vocals
- Labels: Warner Music Taiwan (2004-2008); Emperor Entertainment Group (EEG) (2008–2010); HIM International Music (2010–2016)

Chinese name
- Chinese: 郭品超
Transcriptions
Standard Mandarin
- Hanyu Pinyin: Guō Pǐnchāo
Yue: Cantonese
- Jyutping: Gwok3 Ban2-ciu1
Southern Min
- Hokkien POJ: Koeh Phín-chhiau

Dylan Kuo (Chinese: 郭品超; pinyin: Guō Pǐnchāo; Pe̍h-ōe-jī: Koeh Phín-chhiau; born 8 June 1977) is a Taiwanese actor, singer and model. He rose to fame in 2004 after playing the lead role in the television series The Outsiders. He is also known as Irons Kwok, his earlier western name, and Kwok Bun-chiu, his name pronounced in Cantonese.

== Early life and education ==
Dylan Kuo was born in Taipei, Taiwan, on 8 June 1977, the youngest of a two-child family. He has a brother older than him by 4 years. He has been described by family members and teachers as a shy, quiet and reserved child. His parents divorced when he was very young. He grew up in a single-parent home living with his mother and older brother. His mother worked 2 jobs in order to raise him and his brother, working as a kindergarten teacher by day and at night as a YMCA instructor teaching hairdressing courses. His mother died from breast cancer when he was 14 years old, which Kuo has said was the most unforgettable yet saddest moment in his life.

He then went to live with his father while his older brother moved out on his own. He graduated from Taipei College of Maritime Technology. Originally wanting to be an architect like his older brother, he decided it wasn't the career path he wanted after spending one year in the field.

== Career ==
=== Acting ===
In 2003, he made his acting debut in small roles, his most notable one for the idol series The Rose, playing one of Cecilia Yip's character Han Li's younger boyfriends. He had originally auditioned for the role "Han Jin" which Jerry Huang was eventually cast in. The director was impressed with his audition and decided to bring him back for a cameo role. After being offered more acting roles, Kuo was then signed under Duo Man Ni Productions to manage all his acting activities while Catwalk Production House still managed his advertisement and modeling activities.

In 2004, he got his big break playing the lead role in the television series The Outsiders, a drama about triad gangs in Taipei. After the success of The Outsiders and its sequel The Outsiders II, Kuo was invited by Hong Kong Director Joe Ma to play the lead in the 2005 Hong Kong film Embrace Your Shadow opposite Hong Kong singer-actress Fiona Sit.

For his film debut in Embrace Your Shadow, he plays a small-time cat burglar from Taiwan living in Hong Kong who has to deal with love and triads issues. His character "Juchin" was to originally only speak Mandarin, since director Joe Ma was aware that Kuo did not speak any Cantonese, but wanting to look believable as a person living in Hong Kong, Kuo decided to speak his lines as much as possible in Cantonese. In the behind-the-scenes footage of the film, Kuo can be seen asking the director and production crew on how to pronounce his lines in Cantonese. The film was well-received and he was invited to film another Hong Kong movie, the horror film Black Night.

In 2008, he signed with Hong Kong entertainment management company Emperor Entertainment Group to handle all his activities for the Hong Kong market due to his growing popularity in Hong Kong. After previously playing romantic, tough, cool and reserved characters, Kuo made his first foray into comedy, playing the dorky, nerdy and immature character "Ning Huan Yu" in CTS's 2008 romantic comedy Prince + Princess 2.

In 2009, Kuo made his debut in the Mainland China drama market and since then has mainly concentrated his career there. In 2010, he signed to Taiwanese music and entertainment company HIM International Music, where the company will manage his music, advertisements, modelling and acting activities.

=== Music ===
In 2007, he started his music career signing under record label Warner Music Taiwan. His first album released was Not Anymore. Kuo also occasionally performs the theme songs of the dramas he has acted in.

== Personal life ==
Kuo was previously in a long-term public relationship with a woman simply known as Amy to the public. He and Amy started dating during his early modeling career. It was a long-distance relationship because Amy left Taiwan during the second year of their relationship to study in the United States. Kuo confirmed in 2008 that he and Amy had ended their relationship some time in 2007.

Kuo has a mild case of obsessive–compulsive disorder. He revealed in an interview that he carries a tooth brush, tooth paste, and dental floss with him everywhere, and he must brush his teeth after every meal. He also showers three times a day to make sure he does not have any body odor and putting on cologne whenever he heads outside his home, even if it is a few minute errand to the local market or bank.

Kuo is best friends with actor Peter Ho. The two met while collaborating on the 2007 drama Men and Legends. The two share an interest in body building and a passion for video gaming. Kuo served as best man at Ho's 2016 wedding.

== Filmography ==
=== Television series ===
| Year | Network | English title | Original title | Role | Notes |
|---|---|---|---|---|---|
| 2003 | TTV | The Rose | 薔薇之戀 | Kevin, Han Li's lover | Cameo, episode 10 |
| 2003 | CTV | Six Lines Of Desire | 欲望六人行 | | Cameo |
| 2003 | CTV | Spicy College Students | 麻辣高校生 | Yin Junxi | Cameo |
| 2003 | CTS | Spicy Teacher | 麻辣鮮師 | Yin Junxi | Cameo |
| 2003 | ETTV | Diary Of Sex and The City | 熟女欲望日記 | Zhou Zhiwei | Cameo |
| 2003 | FTV | Step of Dance | 眉飛色舞 | Soccer Captain | Cameo |
| 2004 | GTV | The Outsiders | 鬥魚 | Yu Hao | |
| 2004 | GTV | The Outsiders II | 鬥魚2 | Yu Hao | |
| 2005 | FTV | Coming Lies | 偷天換日 | Cash | |
| 2006 | CTS | White Robe of Love | 白袍之戀 | Tang Qixiu | |
| 2007 | CTV | The Teen Age | 18禁不禁 | PE teacher Lin Menglun | Guest star |
| 2007 | | Men and Legends | 精武飛鴻 | Yan Yingyuan | |
| 2008 | CTS | Prince + Princess 2 | 王子看見二公主 | Ning Huanyu | |
| 2009 | CTS | Knock Knock Loving You | 敲敲愛上你 | Cheng Xuege | |
| 2009 | CNTV | Beauty is Not Bad | 美女不壞 | William Chen | |
| 2010 | Hunan TV | Single Princesses and Blind Dates | 單身公主相親記 | Fang Yan | |
| 2011 | JSTV | The Legend of Chinese Zodiac | 十二生肖傳奇 | Xing Hu | |
| 2012 | CTV | Ia Ia, I Do | 愛啊哎呀，我願意 | Ji Xiangen | |
| 2013 | CTV | Borrow Your Love | 借用一下你的愛 | Ye Chen | |
| 2013 | CCTV | Legend of Mulan | 花木蘭傳奇 | Prince Duo Lun | |
| 2014 | TVBS | The Way We Were | 16個夏天 | Jiang Dawei | Cameo |
| 2015 | ViuTV | Slacker's Food Diary | 懶人美食日記 | Li Ruifan | |
| 2016 | iQiyi | Stardom | 明星志願 | Li Hua | Webseries |
| 2018 | Hunan TV | Negotiator | 谈判官 | Qin Tianyu | |
| 2018 | Jiangsu TV | Snow Queen | 北国英雄 | Gu Zhaolong | |
| 2018 | Youku | Swords of Legends 2 | 古剑奇谭2 | Tong | |
| 2018 | Tencent | Ever Night | 将夜 | Jun Bai | |
| 2020 | Tencent | Eternal Love of Dream | 三生三世枕上书 | Su Moye | |
| TBA | | The Legend of Ba Qing | 贏天下 | Ba Zimuo | |
| TBA | | Love Is Brave | 一场奋不顾身的爱情 | Li Sihan | |
| TBA | | Follow Me My Queen | 王小笛驯夫记 | Yang Jialei | |

=== Film ===
| Year | English title | Original title | Role | Notes |
|---|---|---|---|---|
| 2005 | Embrace Your Shadow | 摯愛 | Juchin | |
| 2006 | Black Night | 黑夜 | Joe | Segment "Next Door" |
| 2007 | The Longest Night in Shanghai | 夜上海 | Tong Tong | |
| 2007 | Shamo | 軍雞 | Ryuichi Yamazaki | |
| 2008 | Sasori | 蠍子 | Hei Tai | |
| 2012 | Hyperspace Rescue | 超時空救兵 | Shi Kejin | |
| 2012 | Bear It | 熊熊愛上你 | Peter | |
| 2012 | Westgate Tango | 西門町 | Jin | |
| 2013 | Love Is Beautiful | 愛,很美 | Ray Zheng-yu | |
| 2013 | Before We Dissolve | 緣來是愛 | | Short film |
| 2014 | Are You Ready to Marry Me | 我想結婚的時候你在哪 | Gao Yi-an | |
| 2015 | Where Are All The Time | 時間都去哪了 | | |
| 2016 | Skiptrace | 絕地逃亡 | Esmond | |
| 2017 | The Choice | 選擇遊戲 | Lin Zijun | |
| 2019 | Magic Circle | | | |

=== Music video appearances ===
| Year | Song title | Details | Video |
|---|---|---|---|
| 2003 | Mr. Right (對的人) | Singer(s): Ailing Tai 戴愛玲; Album: Do Stupid Things For Love (為愛做的傻事) | Video on YouTube |
| 2004 | Only Because of You (都只因為你) | Singer(s): Angela Chang; Album: Over the Rainbow | Video on YouTube |
| 2009 | Insomnia (失眠) | Singer(s): Evonne Hsu; Album: Love*Over (愛*極限) | Video on YouTube |
| 2015 | This is it! (風蕭蕭兮) | Singer(s): Shin; Album: Whatever, I Just Believe In (反正我信了) | Video on YouTube |

== Discography ==
=== Studio albums ===
| # | English title | Original title | Release date | Label |
|---|---|---|---|---|
| 1st | Not Anymore | 我不像我 | 10 August 2004 | Warner Music Taiwan |
| 2nd | Together | 同行 | 19 January 2007 | Warner Music Taiwan |

=== Soundtrack singles ===
| Year | English title | Original title | Television series |
|---|---|---|---|
| 2004 | "Give Up" | 放棄 | The Outsiders |
| 2004 | "Promise" | 答應 | The Outsiders II |
| 2005 | "Steal Another Day" | 偷天換日 | Coming Lies |
| 2013 | "Borrow Loved Ones" | 借用愛的人 | Borrow Your Love |
