= The Fierce Wife =

- Promotional poster
- Chinese: 犀利人妻
- Hanyu Pinyin: Xīlì Rénqī
- Genre: Family, Drama
- Directed by: Xu Fujun 徐輔軍
- Starring: Sonia Sui; James Wen; Chris Wang; Amanda Chu
- Opening theme: 五天几年 by Freya Lin (林凡)
- Country of origin: Taiwan
- Original language: Mandarin
- No. of episodes: 23

Production
- Producer: Wang Peihua 王珮華
- Running time: 90 min. 125 min. (Ep. 21-22); 105 min. (Ep. 23)

Original release
- Network: TTV Main Channel, SETTV
- Release: 5 November 2010 – 15 April 2011

The Fierce Wife, or in Singapore, The Shrewd Wife (Chinese: 犀利人妻; pinyin: Xīlì Rénqī) is a 2010 Taiwanese drama starring Sonia Sui (隋棠), James Wen (溫昇豪), Chris Wang (王宥勝) and Amanda Chu (朱芯儀). It was a TTV (Taiwan Television) (台視) and Sanlih E-Television (SET) (三立) co-presentation, and was directed by Xu Fujun (徐輔軍). The filming started in October 2010, and was first broadcast on 5 November 2010. It’s been on the air ever since.

Before The Fierce Wife was produced, both Sonia Sui and Wen Sheng Hao had acted in two TTV productions, The Year of Happiness and Love (那一年的幸福時光) (2009) and PS Man (偷心大聖PS男) (2010). The Fierce Wife, The Year of Happiness and Love, and PS Man all feature youth idol.

On 9 June 2011, The Fierce Wife, described as “the most talked about TV show in Taiwan,” entered the Japanese market, renamed Does Marriage Guarantee Happiness (結婚って、幸せですか). It was broadcast on BS Nittele (BS日テレ) in Chinese with Japanese subtitles, every Thursday at 2300 in high definition (1080i), six times as high as in Taiwan. The whole TV series was divided into 34 episodes in Japan, and the DVDs in both Chinese and Japanese went on sale on 20 June 2012.

The TV series was a big hit in 2011. “Xiaosan” or “Little Third” (小三), “the other woman” in the story, has become a popular euphemism thanks to the show. Also, merchandise has sold well in Taiwan and abroad. The popular drama was nominated for a number of Golden Bell Awards (Taiwan’s Emmys). Some controversial parts of the story received heated discussion, and the producer Wang Peihua (王珮華) decided to make it into a feature movie set four years after the main female character Xie Anzhen (謝安真) get divorced. A press conference to announce the film adaptation The Fierce Wife: The Final Episode (犀利人妻最終回：幸福男‧不難), was held on 20 January 2012. The film was released on 17 August 2012.

== Synopsis ==
Xie Anzhen is a happily devoted housewife to Wen Ruifan, a handsome young man, Marketing and Sales manager at a cosmetics company up for a promotion to VP. Married for over 10 years, and with a 5-year old daughter (Wen Yumeng) she literally lives to serve her family while letting her image and wardrobe fall through the cracks. One day her mother asks her to please take in her cousin (Li Wei'en) who lives in the United States and was returning to Taiwan on her uncle's behalf. Anzhen accepts without hesitation since she always wants to help out others. Anzhen welcomes Wei En and her cat (Oliver) with open arms, even helping her get a job at Rui Fan's company. Soon after, Wei'en starts seducing Rui Fan who reluctantly refuses her only to end up accepting her advances and filing for divorce from Anzhen. Feeling the guilt of doing what he did to Anzhen he leaves her the house, money, car, and custody of Meng Meng. Anzhen going into a depression, finds herself learning how to live again from Lan Tianwei, a handsome young rich guy who is a perfectionist and top Manager of the Car company where Ruixuan (Ruifan's sister and Anzhen's best friend) gets her a job. He teaches her that there is life after Wen Rui Fan and that she needs to get over it and focus on what really matters in life. Lan Tian Wei ends up falling in love with Anzhen although Anzhen is oblivious to it. Towards the end, as Rui Fan and Wei En's relationship crumbles due to him being jobless because of what he did to An Zhen and Wei En's childish ways their relationship goes sour and Anzhen has a close friendship with the younger Lan Tianwei, her boss and mentor for many episodes. Rui Fan wants to reconcile with Anzhen after him and Wei'en are officially over but Anzhen refuses and may be belatedly developing feelings for Lan Tianwei who backpacks around China for a year doing newspaper articles and writing a book. The ending does not resolve Anzhen's choices, hence the movie set four years after the divorce or two years after the end of the TV series.

== Cast ==
- Sonia Sui as Xie Anzhen (謝安真)
- Chris Wang as Lan Tianwei (藍天蔚)
- James Wen as Wen Ruifan (溫瑞凡)
- Amanda Chu as Li Wei'en (黎薇恩)

=== Extended Cast ===
- A Bao (阿寶) as Wen Yumeng (溫雨萌)
- Hu Yingzhen (胡盈禎) as Wen Ruixuan (溫瑞萱)
- Patrick Lee (李沛旭) as Hao Kangde (郝康德)
- Mini Bin (迷你彬) as Hao Zhuangzhuang (郝壯壯)
- Guan Yong (關勇) as Wen's father (溫父)
- Zhou Jiali (周嘉麗) as Wen's mother (溫母)
- Pan Lili (潘麗麗) as Xie's mother (謝母)
- Xi Manning (席曼寧) as Lan's mother (藍母)
- Janel Tsai as He Ailin (何愛琳)
- Fu Lei (傅雷) as Manager Zhuang (莊總經理)
- Lin Zhixian as Police

== Music ==
- Opening theme song: Wu Tian Ji Nian (五天幾年) by Freya Lin
- Ending theme song: Zhong Shang (重傷) by Freya Lin

== Awards ==
Year	Ceremony	Category	Receiver	Result
2011	47th Golden Bell Awards	Best Television Series	The Fierce Wife	Nominated
2011	47th Golden Bell Awards	Best Leading Actor	James Wen	Nominated
2011	47th Golden Bell Awards	Best Leading Actress	Sonia Sui	Nominated
2011	47th Golden Bell Awards	Best Supporting Actress	Janel Tsai	Nominated
2011	47th Golden Bell Awards	Best Supporting Actress	Amanda Chu	Won
2011	47th Golden Bell Awards	Best Screenplay		Nominated

== Remake ==
- Thailand: Mia 2018 OneHD31 (2018)
