= Joelle Lu =

Taiwanese actress

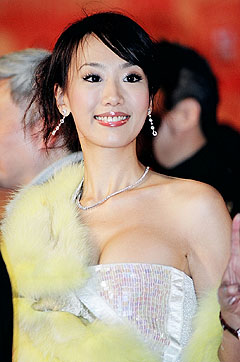
- Born: 4 December 1976 (age 49); Taiwan
- Occupation: actress
- Spouse: Mark

Joelle Lu (Chinese: 陸明君; pinyin: Lù Míngjūn) is a Taiwanese actress.

== Filmography ==
=== Television series ===
Year	English title	Original title	Role	Notes
2003	The Rose	薔薇之戀	Han Fu Rong	
2004	Beauty Lady	女郎	Qian Yue Shan	
2004	Say Yes Enterprise	求婚事務所	Li Ai Ling (Story 6)	
2004	The Outsiders	鬥魚	Li Qi Hong / Hong Dou	
2004	The Outsiders II	鬥魚2	Li Qi Hong / Hong Dou	
2005	When Dolphin Met Cat	海豚愛上貓	Su Ting	
2006	Hanazakarino Kimitachihe	花樣少年少女	Abby	
2007	Queen's	至尊玻璃鞋	Lin Fu Nan	
2007	They Kiss Again	惡作劇2吻	Jun Ya's mother	
2008	Justice for Love	天平上的馬爾濟斯	Zhou Qen Qi	
2011	In Time with You	我可能不會愛你	Grace	
2012	Fairy Valley Incident	神仙谷事件	Hasegawa Chiyo	
2013	A Hint of You	美味的想念	Wang Fang Rui	
2013	A Good Wife	親愛的，我愛上別人了	Pan Ni Nuo	
2014	Once Upon a Time in Beitou	熱海戀歌	A Feng	
2014	You Light Up My Star	你照亮我星球		
2015	Lost? Me Too	迷徒·Claire	Amy	
2016	The Ultimate Ranger	終極遊俠	Tong Yi Nan	
2016	Let It Fly'	讓愛飛揚	Liu Jing Juan	
2017	Never Forget Then	這些年，那些事	Li A Yi	
2018	Iron Ladies	姊的時代	Xia Zi Qing	
2018	Befriend	人際關係事務所	Emma	
2019	The Missing Half	遺失的1/2	Su Mei Huan	
2020	Mother to Be	未來媽媽	Grace	
2022	49 Days With a Merman	我家浴缸的二三事	Jiang Li Mei	
2022	Small & Mighty	正義的算法	Su Li Mei	
2022	Women in Taipei	台北女子圖鑒	Zhou Yi Jun	
2023	At the Moment	此時此刻	Lo Hsin Lan's mother	

=== Films ===
Year	English title	Original title	Role	Notes
2011	Lovesick	戀愛恐慌症	Lisa / Dr. Li	
2012	LOVE	愛		
2013	Good Luck! Boy	加油！男孩	Ms. Shu-hui	
2017	Storm Rider	飆風老爹	Su Fei	
2018	The Outsiders	鬥魚	Lu Chi Hung (adult)	
2021	As We Like It	揭大歡喜	Oliver	
2021	Till We Meet Again	月老	Bull Head	
