= Freya Lim =

Freya Lim 林凡
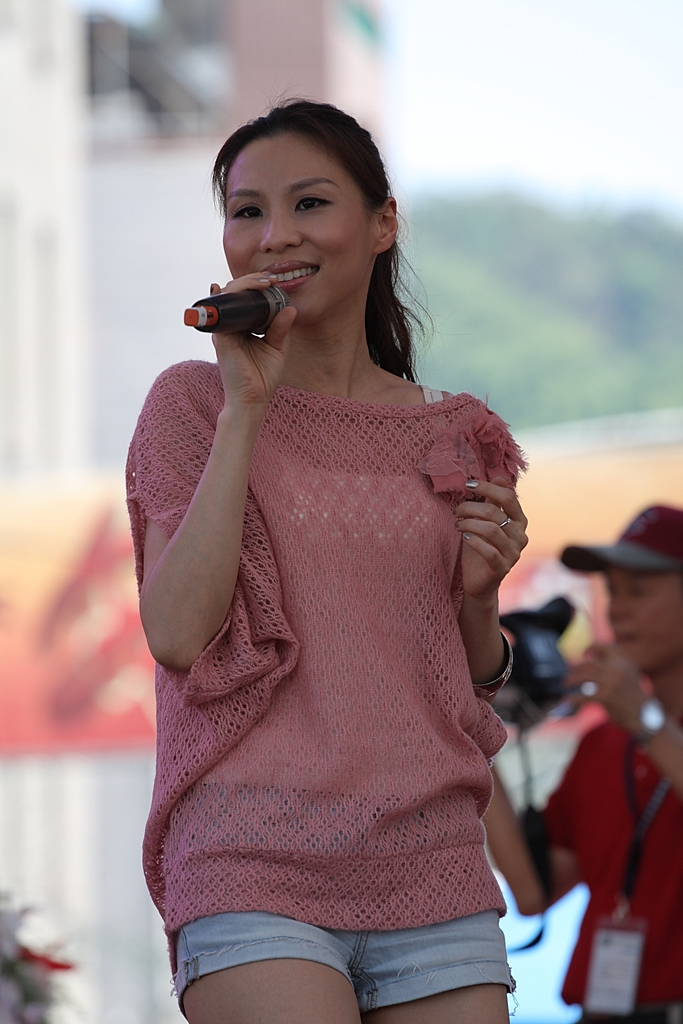
- Freya Lin in 2011
- Born: 20 November 1979 (age 46); Taiwan
- Occupations: Singer, radio deejay
- Years active: 2000–present

Chinese name
- Traditional Chinese: 林凡
Transcriptions
Standard Mandarin
- Hanyu Pinyin: Lin Fan
Southern Min
- Hokkien POJ: Lîm Hoân
- Musical career
- Also known as: Freya Lin, Lin Fan, Freya Lam
- Origin: Penang, Malaysia
- Genres: Mandopop
- Labels: What's Music (1999–2001); Linfair Records (2002–2007); Rock Records (2010–present)
- Website: Freya Lim Official Facebook Page

Freya Lim (Chinese: 林凡; pinyin: Lin Fan; Pe̍h-ōe-jī: Lîm Hoân; born 20 November 1979), also known as Freya Lin, is a Malaysian Mandopop singer and radio deejay based in Taiwan. She is a Taiwanese PR. Her father is a Chinese Malaysian and her mother is a Taiwanese.

In 2002, Lim graduated from University of Washington Seattle majoring in Psychology. After the release of her third album Freya's Love Songs (非愛不可。心林凡) in 2007, Lim went to Boston University to pursue a master's degree in Applied Communication.

== Career ==
In 1999, Lim's singing talent was discovered by Taiwan well-known music producer Benjamin Lin Ming Yang. She was singing acclaimed Mandopop singer Sandy Lam's Night's Too Dark at a KTV with her friends when Benjamin Lin chanced upon her voice, and she was signed on to What's Music International Incorporated.

In 2000, Lim released her debut music album titled Freya (林凡同名專輯). The first single from the album was a new rendition of Sandy Lam's classic hit Night's Too Dark. Other singles from the album include Anything Can Be Forgotten (什麼都可以忘記) and Goodbye Seattle (再見西雅圖). However, Living Alone (一個人生活) was the more popular song from Freya, as it was also the ending theme song of TV series The Beauty Mermaid (天地傳說之魚美人), the song has a Mandarin and Cantonese cover version My Feelings (感應) sung by Hong Kong singer Vincy Chan. The album Freya achieved an astounding sales record of 120,000 copies in Taiwan, and occupied Taiwan music charts for more than six months.

Lim was nominated Best New Artist in 2001 Golden Melody Awards with Freya (林凡同名專輯) and won Best Newcomer (Bronze) in 2001 Singapore Hit Awards with the same album.

She was involved in the musical play Love Mileage (愛情里程) which was staged at Taiwan Huashan Arts Centre between 10 and 13 September 2009.

On top of being an actress and singer, she is also working as a Radio DJ in BCC.

Lim held her first ticketed solo concert 林凡 Freya&Friends 幸福零缺口犀利演唱會 at Taipei International Convention Center (TICC) on 18 August 2012.

== Discography ==
=== Studio albums ===
#	English Title	Chinese Title	Released	Label
1st	Freya	林凡同名專輯	7 August 2000	What's Music
2nd	It's All Him	都是他	10 July 2001	What's Music
3rd	Freya's Love Songs (English Cover Album)	非愛不可。心林凡	3 August 2007	Linfair Records
4th	Holding Back The Tears	眼淚流回去	24 December 2010	Rock Records
5th	Love, Suddenly	愛情_很突然	27 April 2012	Rock Records
6th	Time Doesn't Heal	歲月這把刀	2 May 2014	Rock Records
7th	Goodbye, Ciao, Seeing You Again	再見	28 June 2021	Warner Music Taiwan

=== Singles ===
Released Date	Track Title	Remarks
1 April 2001	Nan Sheng Nu Sheng Pei (男生女生配)	Duet with Andy Hui; Included in Andy Hui's album [這一秒你好不好]
29 July 2005	Crossroads (交叉路口)	Included in Tou Tian Huan Ri (偷天換日) Original Soundtrack
8 August 2008	Tunnel (隧道)	Included in Hot Shot Code Original Soundtrack
8 August 2008	Don't Tell Me (不要對我再說愛)	Included in Hot Shot Code Original Soundtrack
8 April 2011	Listen to you (聽你說)	Duet with Yisa Yu Kewei; Included in The Fierce Wife Original Soundtrack
8 April 2011	Duo Qing (多情)	Included in The Fierce Wife Original Soundtrack
25 November 2011	Guo Qi (過期)	Included in [命中注定最犀利] Compilation Album

== Awards and nominations ==
Year	Award	Category	Nomination	Result	Ref
2001	Golden Melody Awards 台灣金曲獎	Best New Artist 最佳新人獎	Freya 林凡同名專輯	Nominated	
2001	Singapore Hit Awards 新加坡金曲獎	Best Newcomer (Bronze) 最佳新人 （铜獎）	Freya 林凡同名專輯	Won	
2011	Golden Melody Awards 台灣金曲獎	Best Female Pop Vocal Performance 最佳國語女歌手獎	Holding Back The Tears 眼淚流回去	Nominated	
2011	Golden Melody Awards 台灣金曲獎	Best Song of the Year 最佳年度歌曲獎	Wounded (重傷), From Holding Back The Tears 眼淚流回去	Nominated	

== Concerts ==
=== Solo Concerts ===
林凡 Freya&Friends 幸福零缺口犀利演唱會
Date	Location	Venue	Special Guests
18 August 2012	Taipei, Taiwan	Taipei International Convention Center (TICC)	Wei Ru Xuan (Waa), Bobby Chen

=== Joint Concerts ===
犀利女聲 林凡 郁可唯 聽你說演唱會 2012
Date	Location	Venue	Collaboration With
4 November 2012	Singapore	Esplanade – Theatres on the Bay	Yisa Yu Kewei

== Radio ==
- Taiwan i-radio FM96 i-have fun (Weekdays UTC+08:00 16:00–18:00)

== Theatre ==
- Musical play Love Mileage (愛情里程) (staged at Taiwan Huashan Arts Centre from 10–13 September 2009)
