= Ia Ia, I Do =

2012 China-Taiwan romance comedy drama

- Promo poster
- Also known as: Love Ah!, Love Ah Ah I Am Willing, 爱啊哎呀，我愿意
- 愛啊哎呀，我願意
- Genre: Romance, Comedy
- Written by: Ka Fei Ying 咖啡因; Guo Shi Wei 郭世偉
- Directed by: Yang Guan Yu 楊冠玉; Ke Zheng Ming 柯政銘
- Starring: Dylan Kuo 郭品超; Tammy Chen 陳怡蓉; Song Min Yu 宋珉宇; Reyizha Alimjan 热依扎; Xu Yue 徐越
- Opening theme: I Only Like This 我就是喜歡這樣 by Richie Jen 任賢齊 & Della Ding 丁噹
- Ending theme: Starry Night 星空 by Mayday 五月天
- Country of origin: Republic of China (Taiwan)
- Original language: Mandarin
- No. of series: 1
- No. of episodes: Taiwan: 15; China: 24

Production
- Producer: Zu Chen 祖辰
- Production locations: Taiwan; Dongshan County, Fujian, China
- Running time: Without commercials Taiwan: 120 mins (include BTS); China: 40 mins
- Production company: Tudou, Inc. 土豆網

Original release
- Network: CTV
- Release: 24 June – 7 October 2012

Related
- Happy Michelin Kitchen 幸福三顆星; Die Sterntaler 白色之戀

Ia Ia, I Do (simplified Chinese: 爱啊哎呀，我愿意; traditional Chinese: 愛啊哎呀，我願意; pinyin: Ai Ya Ai Ya, Wo Yuan Yi), is a 2012 co-produced Mainland China and Taiwan romance comedy drama. The "Ia Ia" from the title is the sound of whining in Chinese which is pronounced "Ah Ya Ah Ya". The drama stars Dylan Kuo, Tammy Chen, Song Min Yu, Re Yi Zha and Xu Yue. Directed by Yang Guan Yu and Ke Zheng Ming, the drama is produced by Chinese web streaming site Tudou. Filming began on September 5, 2011 on location in Taiwan and Dongshan County in Fujian province, China and finished on December 9, 2011.

== Synopsis ==
Qin Ai Ya is a hard working individual who works many odd jobs to save up money. Due to a past heartbreak she does not think about love but only cares about making money. Her dream is to marry a rich guy so she can live a relaxing life, but she mistakes Ji Xiang En, a rich land developer, for a poor waiter she met at a party.

== Summary ==
Qin Ai Ya (Tammy Chen) is an orphan who lives on the beautiful but impoverished Yuan Zhou Island. She was raised and taken care of by the local residents of the island. Due to a past relationship that ended in heartbreak Ai Ya does not believe in true love anymore, instead focusing on making money and dreaming of becoming rich. To save money and make a living she works many odd jobs such as last-minute wedding photographer, hired actress to break up with someone and drug store manager.

Ji Xiang En (Dylan Kuo) is the tall and handsome CEO of a land development corporation. His father died when he was young leaving him to take care of the family business and his mother. Due to his attractive background and looks, gossip magazines constantly him to many beauties but his love only belongs to Tong Hua (Reyizha Alimjan), his childhood friend who is a rich girl who became a famous actress. Xiang En desperately wants Tong Hua to marry him but she feels she does not love him enough to accept his marriage proposal. When his former friend and classmate Wu Wei (Song Min Yu) shows up to even an old score, Wu Wei courts Tong Hua who he knows is a very important person of Xiang En. Xiang En is heartbroken when he finds out about Tong Hua and Wu Wei relationship in the tabloids.

Ai Ya and Xiang En first encounter each other when she is chasing a purse snatching thief, barefoot in an evening gown on the streets of Taipei. When doing so she damages Xiang En's brand new expensive car without realizing it. The two meet again when Ai Ya crashes a high-profile charity party in hopes of meeting a rich guy. She runs into Xiang En who pretends to be a waiter while trying to get away from tabloid photographers trying to capture images of him and Tong Hua together. Ai Ya mistakes him for a poor waiter when he ruins her dress and soon a lot of misunderstanding ensues between the two.

Ai Ya, Xiang En, Tong Hua and Wu Wei cross paths when Tong Hua's father's corporation is considering developing a seaside resort in Yuan Zhou Island. Xiang En and Wu Wei fight to win the contract for the project, but must gain the local residents' support in order to be the better prospect. It seems the only person that can help them is Qin Ai Ya. As Xiang En and Ai Ya become closer she helps him get over Tong Hua and he breaks the barrier that has prevented her from loving another.

== Cast ==
=== Main cast ===
- Dylan Kuo 郭品超 as Ji Xiang En 季翔恩
- Tammy Chen 陳怡蓉 as Qin Ai Ya 秦璦亞
- Song Min Yu 宋珉宇 as Wu Wei 吳維
- Reyizha Alimjan 热依扎 as Tong Hua 童樺
- Xu Yue 徐越 as Xie Chao Qun 謝超群

=== Supporting cast ===
- Kelly Mi 米凱莉 as Chen Jia Huì 陳家慧
- Liu Cheng En as Chen Yi 沈一
- Qiu De Yang 邱德洋 as Andy
- You Xuan 游喧 as Xuan Xuan 萱萱
- Xu Shuo 許爍 as Yaya 牙牙

=== Cameos ===
- Bai Yun 白雲 as Shoe shop owner 鞋店老闆
- Zhang Da De 張達得 as Wan Shao Jun 萬少君
- He Xi 荷希 as Zhou Lì Lì周莉莉

== Soundtrack ==
No official soundtrack album was released for Ia Ia, I Do. Songs from the soundtrack are taken from Richie Jen's 2011 album Dare Devil (不信邪), Mayday's 2011 album The Second Round (第二人生), Della Ding's 2012 album One In A Thousand (好難得), and Victor Wong's 2012 album Unopened Gift (未拆的礼物). The opening theme song is "I Only Like This 我就是喜歡這樣" by Richie Jen and Della Ding. The closing theme song is "Starry Night 星空" by Mayday.

- "I Only Like This 我就是喜歡這樣" by Richie Jen 任賢齊 & Della Ding 丁噹
- "Starry Night 星空" by Mayday 五月天
- "One Person Is Impossible 一個人不可能" by Della Ding 丁噹
- "I Am Still The Same 我還是一樣" by Della Ding 丁噹
- "Does He Still Know Me 他還認不認得我" by Della Ding 丁噹
- "Radiance 光芒" by Richie Jen 任賢齊
- "Perfect Miracle 完美的奇蹟" by Richie Jen 任賢齊
- "Brave Souls 勇敢的靈魂" by Victor Wong 品冠

== Filming locations ==
Major filming took place in Taipei, Taiwan and Dongshan County in Fujian province, China. Dongshan County served as the location for the fishing village Yuan Zhou Island. Controversy surrounded the drama after filming finished at Dongshan County. Lead actress Tammy Chen said the beautiful fishing village depicted in the drama was actually an impoverished village with a lack of resources. She stated in an interview that there was no hot water where they stayed, only one bathroom in the entire village, lack of stock and supplies at the local grocery store and lack of food when witnessing villagers during meals.

== Broadcast ==
Ia Ia, I Do was first broadcast on Chinese channels Shenzhen Satellite TV and Anhui Television on March 12, 2012 airing the 40 minute without behind the scenes 24 episodes version. Taiwan's CTV's version began airing the 90 minute with behind the scenes 15 episode version on March 2, 2012. CTV's re-broadcast of the 90 minute with behind the scenes 15 episodes version aired weekly at 4:30 PM. Later CTV re-aired the drama on its HD channel airing a 60-minute without the behind the scenes 15 episode version on June 6, 2012. China's 24 episode version can still be seen on Tudou's streaming website.

Channel	Country/location	Airing date	Timeslot
Shenzhen Satellite TV	China	March 2, 2012	Nightly 7:30 PM
AHTV	China	March 2, 2012	Nightly 7:30 PM
CTV	Taiwan	June 6, 2012	Sunday 10:00 PM
CTV	Taiwan	July 1, 2012	Weekly 4:30PM
CTV HD	Taiwan	December 15, 2012	Saturday & Sunday 1:00 AM

== Episode ratings ==
Ia Ia, I Do mostly ranked third throughout the series airing with a total average of 0.74. The viewers' survey was conducted by AGB Nielsen with a survey range of 4yo TV audience.

Competing dramas on rival channels airing at the same time slot were:

- TTV - Love Forward, Miss Rose
- CTS - Alice in Wonder City, Waking Love Up
- FTV - Absolute Darling, Once Upon a Love

Air date	Episode	Average ratings	Rank	Remarks
June 24, 2012	01	1.26	2	
July 1, 2012	02	1.04	2	
July 8, 2012	03	0.97	3	
July 15, 2012	04	0.91	2	
July 22, 2012	05	0.81	3	
July 29, 2012	06	0.77	2	TTV aired a "LONDON 2012 Olympic" special
August 5, 2012	07	0.78	3	
August 12, 2012: No episode was aired due to CTV airing the "London 2012 Olympic Basketball Championship" game live
August 19, 2012	08	0.65	3	
August 26, 2012	09	0.70	3	
September 2, 2012	10	0.52	3	
September 9, 2012	11	0.65	3	
September 16, 2012	12	0.55	3	
September 23, 2012	13	0.59	3	
September 30, 2012	14	0.48	3	
October 10, 2012	15	0.46	3	
Average ratings		0.74		
