= The Rose (Taiwanese TV series) =

2003 Taiwanese television series

- Promotion title
- Also known as: 薔薇之戀 蔷薇之恋; Qiáng Wéi Zhī Liàn
- Genre: Romance; Comedy; Family, Melodrama
- Based on: Bara no Tame ni by Akemi Yoshimura
- Directed by: Chu Yu-ning (瞿友寧)
- Starring: Ella Chen; Jerry Huang; Joe Cheng; Selina Jen; Joelle Lu; Hebe Tian; Cecilia Yip
- Opening theme: "花都開好了" (Flowers Have Blossomed) – S.H.E
- Ending theme: "葉子" (Leaves) – A-Sun
- Country of origin: Republic of China
- Original languages: Mandarin; Taiwanese Hokkien
- No. of episodes: 26

Production
- Production location: Taipei, Taiwan

Original release
- Network: Taiwan Television (TTV)
- Release: 25 May – 23 November 2003

The Rose (traditional Chinese: 薔薇之戀; simplified Chinese: 蔷薇之恋; pinyin: Qiáng Wéi Zhī Liàn) is a 2003 Taiwanese drama starring Ella Chen, Jerry Huang, Joe Cheng, Joelle Lu and Cecilia Yip. It was based on the Japanese josei manga, Bara no Tame ni (薔薇のために; lit. For the Roses' Sake), written by Akemi Yoshimura and directed by Chu Yu-ning (瞿友寧). It was broadcast on Taiwan Television (TTV) (台視) from 25 May 2003 to 23 November 2003. The series won Most Popular Drama of the Year at the 2004 Golden Bell Awards, Taiwan.

== Synopsis ==
Zheng Bai He (Ella Chen), after being dumped by her boyfriend because she is ugly and fat and having her grandmother die on the same day (talk about fate), finds that her mother did not die. Furthermore, her mother is the famous actress Han Li (Cecilia Yip). She finds herself in the Han family, yet, the truth about her birth has not been revealed.

Surrounded by three half-siblings, Han Fu Rong (Joelle Lu), Han Jin (Jerry Huang) and Han Kui (Joe Cheng), all by the same mother but different fathers, and a pretty harsh and cold mother, Bai He (Ella Chen) takes on the role of a maid. The three siblings are isolated from each other and the society. They have a cold appearance, yet each of them has a warm story behind them. This is the fairy tale of how Cinderella changes each of them, and finds the princess within herself.

Bai He is an extremely ordinary young girl in the story. Even though she has a kind-hearted and generous heart, but being short and chubby, she is always being refused by people because she is not attractive enough. Her appearance has always been the origin of Bai He's inferior feelings. Because that is a fact that no matter how much strength she uses, she is unable to change. This inferior feeling deeply influences Bai He's life, her interpersonal relations, and even her own emotions. There are lots of beautiful girls that always appears by Bai He's side. The radiance that they give off is like that of a peacock spreading its feathers, conceited and arrogantly striding ahead with their chins up. And Bai He is always used to retreating to the back. In her mind, "I am always ugly." has long ago became an established law that doesn't change. When other people harms her, makes her doubt this established law of hers, she would turn around and make excuses for that person, comforting her own wavering, uneasy heart.

Bai He is exactly this girl that is gentle and soft, yet has inferior feelings of herself. Even though her beautiful heart far surpasses outward appearances by a thousand hundred times, but in a society that has all along judged people by their appearances, she is just like many of the other girls who also has ordinary appearances who deeply feel miserable over their lack in their looks and forgets about the other characteristics and merits that they have. That is, until she finds the confidence and courage to love herself from all those people that loves her. She eventually reveals the brilliant glitter of her gem and helps the people that she loves in her family to untie the knot of many years of disputes, to accept each other once again.

The Rose preserves the established roles of the original story and the story's infrastructure, also strengthens the personality of the roles, making them stand out, detailing the turning points of the character's mood within the show, hoping that within the entertainment, it can give the audience even more moving feelings. Furthermore, guiding the audience through an even deeper layer of thinking on love, family and friendship.

== Cast ==
=== Main cast ===
Actor	Drama character	Manga character |Notes	
Ella Chen	Zheng Bai He (鄭百合)	Yuri Makurano	Episode 1–26
Joe Cheng	Han Kui (韓葵)	Aoi Hanatashiki	Episode 1–26
Jerry Huang (黃志瑋)	Han Jin (韓菫)	Sumire Hanatashiki	Episode 1–26
Joelle Lu	Han Fu Rong (韓芙蓉)	Fuyo Hanatashiki	Episode 1–26
Cecilia Yip	Han Li (韓俐)	Shoko Hanai	Episode 1–26

=== Supporting cast ===
Actor	Drama character
Selina Jen	Zhuang Zhe Qing (莊哲芹)(Deceased/flashback in each Episode) & Di Ya Man (狄雅蔓)(Episode 8, 9, 10)
Hebe Tien	Xiao Feng (曉楓) (Episode 18, 19, 20)
Bi Li (比莉)	Po Po (婆婆)
Hong Jiao Nang (紅膠囊)	Mao Ji (陶貓吉)
Z-Chen (張智成)	Shi Shan Bo (石山柏) (Bai He's high school friend – Episode 12, 13)
Aisa Senda	Mary (Bai He's friend – Episode 1, 2)
Dylan Kuo	Kevin (Han Li's boyfriend – Episode 10)
Kenji Wu	Mao Ji's friend (cameo in Episode 10)
Zhang Hao Ming	Mao Ji's manga editor
Huang Wan Bo	Mao Ji's manga editor
Renzo Liu	Li Zhi Mao
Chien Te-men	Grandpa Li (李爺爺) (Bai He's grandfather)
Wang Juan	Han's relative
Long Chen Han (隆宸翰)	Bai He's arranged date
Zhang Yong Zheng	Doctor
Gu Xuan Chun	Zheng Ye
Ying Tsai-Ling	Zhuang Zhe Qing's Mother
Sam Tseng	Director Tsai

== Soundtrack ==
Published by HIM International Music on 1 June 2003

- Opening theme song – "花都開好了" (Flowers Have Blossomed) – S.H.E
- Ending theme song – "葉子" (Leaves) – A-Sun
