= Jim Lee (music producer) =

Jim Lee (Chinese: 李振權) is a record producer, compose, arranger, musician, recording and live audio engineer who has worked around the world especially in Taiwan, Hong Kong, China and the U.S.A. He has worked in the music business for more than 30 years and has produced numerous critically acclaimed award winning works. He started out as an independent producer, engineer, musician and composer but also gained useful insight into the industry by working as A&R manager for various international record labels. Feeling the desire to further his own brand of creativity he founded the independent production house/publisher Workingmaster Company Ltd. and works in the capacity of Music Director and Chief Engineer.

== Education ==
University of California at Berkeley: Bachelor of Science degree in Electrical Engineering and Computer Science.

== Music Works and Awards ==
=== Studio albums ===
Some of his album production awards are:

- Wakin Chau (周華健)Made Me Happy & Sad(讓我歡喜讓我憂): 3rd Annual GMA Producer of the year award
- Karen Mok (莫文蔚) Be Yourself (做自己) and I Say albums: Annual Best 10 albums from The Association of Music Workers in Taiwan
- Leehom Wang 王力宏 Revolution (公轉自轉): 10th annual GMA Best male vocalist and Producer of the year awards, Annual Best 10 albums from The Association of Music Workers in Taiwan
- Sandy Lam 林憶蓮 (林憶蓮) At Least I Have You (至少還有你): Annual Best 10 albums from The Association of Music Workers in Taiwan
- Stanley Huang (黃立行) Circus Monkey(馬戲團的猴子): Annual Best 10 albums from The Association of Music Workers in Taiwan
- Sandy Lam 林憶蓮 2001(2001蓮): Annual Best 10 albums from The Association of Music Workers in Taiwan
- Eason Chan (陳奕迅) Special Thanks to…: 14th annual GMA Best male vocalist and Album of the year awards GMA, Annual Best 10 albums from The Association of Music Workers in Taiwan,
- Lisa Hsieh 謝凌君 More Lisa: Annual Best 10 albums from The Association of Music Workers in Taiwan
- Sandy Lam (林憶蓮) Paper Plane(原本…. 林憶蓮/紙飛機): Annual Best 10 albums from The Association of Music Workers in Taiwan
- Eason Chan (陳奕迅) Black, White, Gray(黑白灰): Annual Best 10 albums from The Association of Music Workers in Taiwan
- Eason Chan (陳奕迅) Don't Want To Let Go(不想放手): 20th annual GMA Album of the year award, Annual Best 10 albums from The Association of Music Workers in Taiwan
- Freya Lim 林凡 'Tears-眼淚流回去' 22nd annual GMA best female vocalist nominee
- A Mei 張惠妹 R U Watching?你在看我嗎? 23rd annual GMA best female vocalist nominee
- Adrian Fu 符致逸 'Good Morning Hard City' 26th annual GMA best new artist nominee
- On Chan (陳建安) Single: 一吻穿越四十六億歲 ／A Kiss From Another Life: 2019 Hong Kong Ultimate Song Chart Awards top 10 and Ultimate Singer-Songwriter Gold Award

=== Recording and Mixing ===
Noted Recording and Mixing awards are:

- Ren Ling Yu OST (阮玲玉電影原聲帶): Best Recording & Mixing from Golden Melody Award
- Jonathan Lee (李宗盛) Cherish (不捨): Best Recording & Mixing from Golden Melody Award
