= Golden Bell Awards =

Taiwanese television and radio programming award

Golden Bell Awards 金鐘獎
- Current: 61st Golden Bell Awards
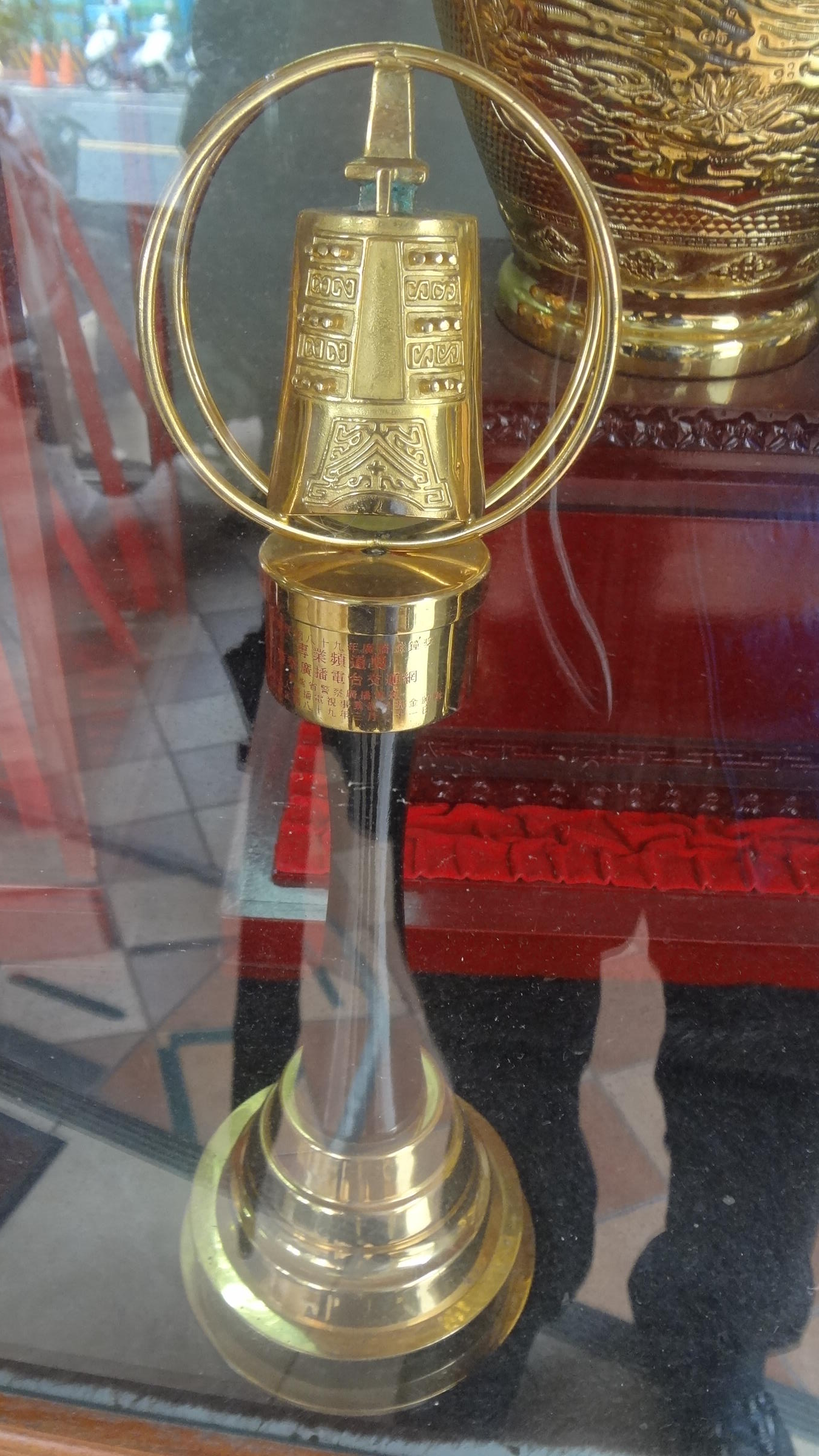
- Official logo (statuette) of the Golden Bell Awards
- Awarded for: Best in television and radio programming
- Location: Taiwan
- Country: Taiwan
- Presented by: Bureau of Audiovisual and Music Industry Development, Ministry of Culture (Taiwan)
- Reward: Golden Bell statuette
- First award: 1965
- Website: https://gba.tavis.tw/

The Golden Bell Awards (Chinese: 金鐘獎; pinyin: Jīnzhōngjiǎng) is an annual Taiwanese television and radio production award presented in October or November each year by the Bureau of Audiovisual and Music Industry Development, a division of Taiwan's Ministry of Culture. It is the first radio and television production award in Chinese circulation, founded in 1965, and Taiwan's equivalent to the Emmy Awards. It is also one of the three major annual entertainment and cultural awards presented in Taiwan, along with the Golden Melody Awards for music and the Golden Horse Film Festival and Awards for films. The awards were presented by the Government Information Office until 2011.

Currently, there are two main streams presented at separate ceremonies: Television Golden Bell Awards (Chinese: 電視金鐘獎) and Broadcast Golden Bell Awards (Chinese: 廣播金鐘獎).

== History ==
When they began the awards only focused on news programs, music shows and advertisements. After five years, however, television programs were also included. The first iterations of the Golden Bell Awards had awards for "Programs Targeting the Mainland."

=== Timeline ===
- 1965 – Established by Government Information Office
- 1968 – Handover to Council for Cultural Affairs
- 1975 – Council for Cultural Affairs was closed, Government Information Office takeover
- 1980 – International, professional and artistic is the aim set by Government Information Office to be achieved by inviting foreign television broadcasting experts to join.
- 1981 – Starting from this year the awards began to broadcast on television, with many changes made to attract more viewers.
- 1982 – Two new awards were added, "Academic Theory" and "Videoing Technology".
- 1984 – Before the ceremony, there was a cocktail party for the nominees and its family members. This year the emphasis of the awards is that if you are one of the nominees, you are already a winner.
- 1993–1999 – The awards were split into two separate awards ceremonies, one for television broadcasting and one for Radio broadcasting, which were held in alternating years (i.e. TV in 1993, radio in 1994 and so on). From year 2000 onwards, both ceremonies are held every year.
- 1995–1999 – Republic of China Association of radio and television broadcasting, Television Society of the Republic of China, Foundation Development Fund and the host of radio and television broadcasting stations jointly co-organized the ceremony. This was the first time the general public could participate in the awards.
- 2000–2003 – Government Information Office hand over to the Broadcasting Development Foundation to coordinate. However, in 2004 the Government Information Office took back control of the award ceremony.
- 2007–2008 – Government Information Office used the theme "Student Association" for the ceremony. The ceremony invited three different generations of television broadcasting personnel.
- 2011 – The 46th Golden Bell Awards was the first time it was broadcast live in Full HD, and an app was released by the Government Information Office allowing it to be watched on a smart phone or tablet pc. This year theme was the convergence of mobile network, internet and television broadcast.
- 2022 – The 57th Golden Bell Awards was separated into two ceremonies, one for television shows, and the other for drama series. Four additional technical categories were also given out, namely Best Costume Design for a Drama Series, Best Visual Effects for a Drama Series, Best Score for a Drama Series and Best Theme Song. Popular voting awards were introduced as well at the 57th Golden Bell Awards, where viewers can vote online to decide the winners for the Most Popular Drama Series and Most Popular Variety Show.

== Public's view ==
Some argued that nine people voting for the Golden Bell Awards is unfair and biased as they believe that it is a subjective choice made by the judges. Some judges were also questioned by the general public for not being professionals of the television industry.

== Award categories ==
=== Television Broadcasting Golden Bell Awards ===
==== Drama Series categories ====
===== Program Awards =====
- Best Television Series
- Best Miniseries
- Best Television Film

===== Individual awards =====
- Best Directing for a Television Series
- Best Writing for a Television Series
- Best Leading Actor in a Television Series
- Best Leading Actress in a Television Series
- Best Supporting Actor in a Television Series
- Best Supporting Actress in a Television Series
- Best Newcomer in a Television Series
- Best Directing for a Miniseries or Television Film
- Best Writing for a Miniseries or Television Film
- Best Leading Actor in a Miniseries or Television Film
- Best Leading Actress in a Miniseries or Television Film
- Best Supporting Actor in a Miniseries or Television Film
- Best Supporting Actress in a Miniseries or Television Film
- Best Newcomer in a Miniseries or Television Film

===== Technical Awards =====
- Best Cinematography for a Drama Series
- Best Editing for a Drama Series
- Best Lighting for a Drama Series
- Best Sound Design for a Drama Series
- Best Art and Design for a Drama Series
- Best Costume Design for a Drama Series
- Best Visual Effects for a Drama Series
- Best Score for a Drama Series
- Best Theme Song

===== Other Awards =====
- Special Contribution Award
- Creative Award for a Drama Series
- Most Popular Drama Series

==== Television Show categories ====
===== Program Awards =====
- Best Variety Show
- Best Reality or Game Show
- Best Lifestyle Show
- Best Natural Science Documentary Show (自然科學紀實節目獎)
- Best Humanities Documentary Show (人文紀實節目)
- Best Children Show (兒童節目獎)
- Best Youth Show (少年節目獎)
- Best Animated Show (動畫節目獎)

===== Individual awards =====
- Best Host in a Variety Show
- Best Host in a Reality or Game Show
- Best Host in a Lifestyle Show
- Best Host in a Natural Science and Humanities Documentary Show (自然科學及人文紀實節目主持人獎)
- Best Host in a Children and Youth Show (兒童少年節目主持人獎)

===== Technical Awards =====
- Best Directing for a Television Show (一般節目類導演獎)
- Best Television Director (一般節目類導播獎)
- Best Cinematography for a Television Show (一般節目類攝影獎)
- Best Editing for a Television Show (一般節目類剪輯獎)
- Best Sound Design for a Television Show (一般節目類聲音設計獎)
- Best Lighting for a Television Show (一般節目類燈光獎)
- Best Art and Design for a Television Show (一般節目類美術設計獎)

===== Other Awards =====
- Special Contribution Award
- Creative Award for a Television Show
- Most Popular Variety Show

=== Radio Broadcasting Golden Bell Awards ===
==== Program Awards ====
- Popular Music Radio Program Award
- Genre Music Programming Award（類型音樂節目獎）
- Best Educational and Cultural Program (教育文化節目獎)
- Best Children Program (兒童少年節目獎)
- Best Comprehensive Program (綜合節目獎)
- Social Care Program Award
- Art and Culture Program Award
- Radio Drama Award
- Youth Program Award
- Community Program Award

==== Advertising Awards ====
- Best Selling Advertising Award
- Best Advertising Award
- Best Marketing Program (節目行銷獎)
- Best Advertising Campaign (頻道廣告獎)
- Research and Development Award
- Radio Marketing Innovation Award

==== Individual awards ====
- DJ Award
- Genre Music Programming Presenters Award（類型音樂節目主持人獎）
- Education and Culture Presenters Award
- Children Show Host Award
- Social Care Award Host
- Art and Culture Award Host
- Comprehensive Award Host
- Community Award Host
- Planning and Preparation Award
- Sound Award

== Ceremonies ==
Minguo Year (Note: Since the award is organized by a government agency, reference to the year in many sources uses the Minguo calendar rather than the Gregorian calendar.)	Ceremony	Date (Note: The dates corresponds to the Television Golden Bell Awards ceremony.)	Venue	Official Broadcaster
54	1st Golden Bell Awards	10 July 1965	Zhongshan Hall, Taipei, Taiwan	—N/a
55	2nd Golden Bell Awards	26 March 1966	Zhongshan Hall, Taipei, Taiwan	—N/a
56	3rd Golden Bell Awards	26 March 1967	Zhongshan Hall, Taipei, Taiwan	—N/a
57	4th Golden Bell Awards	26 March 1968	Zhongshan Hall, Taipei, Taiwan	—N/a
58	5th Golden Bell Awards	26 March 1969	Teachers' Hostel, Taichung, Taiwan	—N/a
59	6th Golden Bell Awards	25 March 1970	Unite Hotel, Taipei, Taiwan	—N/a
60	7th Golden Bell Awards	25 March 1971	Zhongshan Hall, Taipei, Taiwan	—N/a
61	8th Golden Bell Awards	26 March 1972	Ambassador Hotel, Taipei, Taiwan	—N/a
62	9th Golden Bell Awards	26 March 1973	Armed Forces Cultural Center, Taipei, Taiwan	—N/a
63	10th Golden Bell Awards	26 March 1974	Armed Forces Cultural Center, Taipei, Taiwan	—N/a
64	11th Golden Bell Awards	26 March 1975	Armed Forces Cultural Center, Taipei, Taiwan	—N/a
65	12th Golden Bell Awards	26 March 1976	Armed Forces Cultural Center, Taipei, Taiwan	—N/a
66	13th Golden Bell Awards	26 March 1977	Armed Forces Cultural Center, Taipei, Taiwan	—N/a
67	14th Golden Bell Awards	26 March 1978	Armed Forces Cultural Center, Taipei, Taiwan	—N/a
69	15th Golden Bell Awards	26 March 1980	Sun Yat-sen Memorial Hall, Taipei, Taiwan	Chinese Television System (CTS)
70	16th Golden Bell Awards	16 May 1981	Sun Yat-sen Memorial Hall, Taipei, Taiwan	Taiwan Television (TTV)
71	17th Golden Bell Awards	13 March 1982	Sun Yat-sen Memorial Hall, Taipei, Taiwan	China Television (CTV)
72	18th Golden Bell Awards	23 March 1983	Sun Yat-sen Memorial Hall, Taipei, Taiwan	Chinese Television System (CTS)
73	19th Golden Bell Awards	18 March 1984	Sun Yat-sen Memorial Hall, Taipei, Taiwan	Taiwan Television (TTV)
74	20th Golden Bell Awards	24 March 1985	Sun Yat-sen Memorial Hall, Taipei, Taiwan	China Television (CTV)
75	21st Golden Bell Awards	22 March 1986	Sun Yat-sen Memorial Hall, Taipei, Taiwan	Chinese Television System (CTS)
76	22nd Golden Bell Awards	21 March 1987	Taipei City Arts Promotion Office, Taipei, Taiwan	Taiwan Television (TTV)
77	23rd Golden Bell Awards	19 March 1988	National Theater, Taipei, Taiwan	China Television (CTV)
78	24th Golden Bell Awards	9 April 1989	National Theater, Taipei, Taiwan	Chinese Television System (CTS)
79	25th Golden Bell Awards	14 April 1990	Sun Yat-sen Memorial Hall, Taipei, Taiwan	Taiwan Television (TTV)
80	26th Golden Bell Awards	27 April 1991	Sun Yat-sen Memorial Hall, Taipei, Taiwan	China Television (CTV)
81	27th Golden Bell Awards	11 July 1992	Sun Yat-sen Memorial Hall, Taipei, Taiwan	Chinese Television System (CTS)
82	28th Golden Bell Awards	20 March 1993	Sun Yat-sen Memorial Hall, Taipei, Taiwan	Taiwan Television (TTV)
83	29th Golden Bell Awards	26 March 1994	Sun Yat-sen Memorial Hall, Taipei, Taiwan	China Television (CTV)
84	30th Golden Bell Awards	25 March 1995	Sun Yat-sen Memorial Hall, Taipei, Taiwan	Chinese Television System (CTS)
85	31st Golden Bell Awards	25 March 1996	Sun Yat-sen Memorial Hall, Taipei, Taiwan	Taiwan Television (TTV)
86	32nd Golden Bell Awards	26 March 1997	Sun Yat-sen Memorial Hall, Taipei, Taiwan	China Television (CTV)
87	33rd Golden Bell Awards	25 March 1998	Sun Yat-sen Memorial Hall, Taipei, Taiwan	Chinese Television System (CTS)
88	34th Golden Bell Awards	31 March 1999	Sun Yat-sen Memorial Hall, Taipei, Taiwan	Formosa Television (FTV)
89	35th Golden Bell Awards	6 October 2000	Sun Yat-sen Memorial Hall, Taipei, Taiwan	Formosa Television (FTV)
90	36th Golden Bell Awards	28 September 2001	Sun Yat-sen Memorial Hall, Taipei, Taiwan	Taiwan Television (TTV)
91	37th Golden Bell Awards	4 October 2002	Sun Yat-sen Memorial Hall, Taipei, Taiwan	Taiwan Television (TTV)
92	38th Golden Bell Awards	5 November 2003	Sun Yat-sen Memorial Hall, Taipei, Taiwan	Eastern Television (ETTV)
93	39th Golden Bell Awards	26 November 2004	Sun Yat-sen Memorial Hall, Taipei, Taiwan	Eastern Television (ETTV)
94	40th Golden Bell Awards	12 November 2005	New Taipei Multi Purpose Hall, New Taipei, Taiwan	Eastern Television (ETTV)
95	41st Golden Bell Awards	20 December 2006	Kaohsiung Municipal Social Education Centre, Kaohsiung, Taiwan	Azio TV
96	42nd Golden Bell Awards	10 November 2007	Sun Yat-sen Memorial Hall, Taipei, Taiwan	Azio TV
97	43rd Golden Bell Awards	31 October 2008	Sun Yat-sen Memorial Hall, Taipei, Taiwan	Azio TV
98	44th Golden Bell Awards	16 October 2009	Sun Yat-sen Memorial Hall, Taipei, Taiwan	Taiwan Television (TTV)
99	45th Golden Bell Awards	22 October 2010	Sun Yat-sen Memorial Hall, Taipei, Taiwan	Taiwan Television (TTV)
100	46th Golden Bell Awards	21 October 2011	Sun Yat-sen Memorial Hall, Taipei, Taiwan	China Television (CTV)
101	47th Golden Bell Awards	26 October 2012	Sun Yat-sen Memorial Hall, Taipei, Taiwan	Chinese Television System (CTS)
102	48th Golden Bell Awards	25 October 2013	Sun Yat-sen Memorial Hall, Taipei, Taiwan	China Television (CTV)
103	49th Golden Bell Awards	25 October 2014	Sun Yat-sen Memorial Hall, Taipei, Taiwan	China Television (CTV)
104	50th Golden Bell Awards	26 September 2015	Sun Yat-sen Memorial Hall, Taipei, Taiwan	China Television (CTV)
105	51st Golden Bell Awards	8 October 2016	Sun Yat-sen Memorial Hall, Taipei, Taiwan	Sanlih E-Television
106	52nd Golden Bell Awards	30 September 2017	Sun Yat-sen Memorial Hall, Taipei, Taiwan	Sanlih E-Television
107	53rd Golden Bell Awards	6 October 2018	Sun Yat-sen Memorial Hall, Taipei, Taiwan	Sanlih E-Television
108	54th Golden Bell Awards	5 October 2019	Sun Yat-sen Memorial Hall, Taipei, Taiwan	Sanlih E-Television
109	55th Golden Bell Awards	26 September 2020	Sun Yat-sen Memorial Hall, Taipei, Taiwan	Sanlih E-Television
110	56th Golden Bell Awards	2 October 2021	Sun Yat-sen Memorial Hall, Taipei, Taiwan	Sanlih E-Television
111	57th Golden Bell Awards	21 and 22 October 2022	Sun Yat-sen Memorial Hall, Taipei, Taiwan	Sanlih E-Television
112	58th Golden Bell Awards	20 and 21 October 2023	Sun Yat-sen Memorial Hall, Taipei, Taiwan	Sanlih E-Television
113	59th Golden Bell Awards	18 and 19 October 2024	Taipei Music Center, Taipei, Taiwan	Sanlih E-Television
114	60th Golden Bell Awards	17 and 18 October 2025	Taipei Music Center, Taipei, Taiwan	Sanlih E-Television
115	61st Golden Bell Awards	25 and 26 October 2026 (Note: The awards show was originally planned to be held on 23 and 24 October, but they got briefly postponed due to Typhoon Champi, marking the first time since 14th edition to be rescheduled.)	Taipei Music Center, Taipei, Taiwan	Sanlih E-Television

== See also ==
- List of Asian television awards
