= 13th Golden Bell Awards =

1977 Taiwanese radio and television programming awards

- Date: 26 March 1977 (radio and television)
- Site: Armed Forces Cultural Center, Taipei, Taiwan
- Hosted by: Ting Mao-shih
- Organized by: Government Information Office, Executive Yuan

The 13th Golden Bell Awards (Chinese: 第13屆金鐘獎) was held on 26 March 1977 at the Armed Forces Cultural Center in Taipei, Taiwan. The ceremony was hosted by Ting Mao-shih.

== Winners ==
Award	Winner	Network
Broadcast Excellence Awards
News and Current Affairs Commentary Program
Best Broadcast Award: Excellence Awards:	Thriving: Taichung Harbor navigable today; Hualien Harbor; 創造財富; 就事論事; News Feature	Restoration Revival Radio: Broadcasting Corporation of China - Tainan and Taiwan; Army Corps Hualien Taiwan Broadcasting; Broadcasting Corporation of China - Taitung Taiwan; Police Radio Station; Fengming Radio
Education and Cultural Programs
Best Broadcast Award Excellence Awards:	Military dependents club: Country music appreciation; Corner Church and State; Love late Pavilion; Yong Huai Chiang Kai-shek; Air Counsel	Army Corps Hualien Taiwan Broadcasting: Broadcasting Corporation of China; Army Corps of Kaohsiung, Taiwan Broadcasting; China Radio; Taipei, Taiwan Cheng Sheng Broadcasting Corporation; Police Radio Station
Popular Entertainment Programs
Best Broadcast Award: Excellence Awards:	Good Morning Song: Meilun Yamashita; Christmas Eve; Night melody; Popular music; Rotary World Tour	China Kaohsiung, Taiwan Broadcasting Corporation: Broadcasting Corporation of China - Hualien Taiwan; Police Radio Station; Revival Radio - Keelung Taiwan; Revival Radio - Taichung Taiwan; China Radio
Specific Special Awards
Best Broadcast Award Excellence Awards:	開創國家的新機運: 怎麼辦; 真情實話; 自由光明之路; 對大陸青年朋友廣播; 工商貿易時間	Broadcasting Corporation of China - Overseas Department: Radio Voice of Guanghua Guanghua; Air Force Radio; Army Corps Hualien Taiwan Broadcasting; Radio Voice of Guanghua Guanghua; In the Ministry of Overseas Broadcasting Corporation
Television Excellence Awards
News and Current Affairs Commentary Programs
Best Television Award Excellence Awards:	The future success of the eleven congress: Continuity and future of conferences; Agriculture Fishing News	Taiwan Television Enterprise: China Television Company; China Television Company
Education and Cultural Programs
Best Television Award Excellence Awards:	Window of music - from traditional to modern: 跳動七十二; 分秒世界	China Television Company: China Television; Taiwan Television Enterprise
Popular Entertainment Programs
Best Television Award Excellence Awards:	得獎節目: Benefit of the village	Taiwan Television Enterprise: China Television
Advertising Awards
Radio Advertising Programs
Best Radio Advertising Award: Excellence Awards:	Aibo Te piano: International brand TECHNICS CD4 quadraphonic sound; Vowel Electric Company; Pretty good camera; Global licensing audio	Acoustic Radio: Broadcasting Corporation of China; Cheng Sheng Broadcasting Corporation Taitung Taiwan; Voices Radio; Taipei, Taiwan Cheng Sheng Broadcasting Corporation
Television Advertising Programs
Best Advertising Award Excellence Awards:	Obediently Clean Campaign: Kleenex napkins; Happy Soap; 菲仕蘭奶粉; Pine juice	East Joint Corporation: Grand Century Utilities Company Limited; Nam Chemical Company; Hongxin Trading Company; 黑松飲料股份有限公司
Individual Awards
Best Production Award	ZENG Ji Tong - "Royalton mountain" Jiang Guobin - "air posters"	Broadcasting Corporation of China - Hualien; Radio Voice of the Golden Gate Guanghua
Best Sound Award	Tsang Ming Fang - "Chinese music appreciation"	Broadcasting Corporation of China
Best Interview Award	Yang Kehua - "Taichung Harbor navigable today"	Broadcasting Corporation of China - Taiwan
Best Broadcaster Award	Li Chi-chun - "Good Morning Song"; Zhougui Sen - "high-wire screen"	Broadcasting Corporation of China - Kaohsiung; Army Corps Kaohsiung army radio broadcasting
Best Editor Award	Gao Wen Tang - 愛晚亭; Liaoyuan Tai - 台中港今天通航	China Radio; Broadcasting Corporation of China - Taiwan
Special Awards
Special Awards	領袖精神萬古常新; Teaching programs	China Television Company; China Television
Society Award
Society Awards:	Great building; Happy Farm; Refuges; Family Recipes; Vientiane fax; Current Affairs Forum; Legal knowledge; 清潔社會; Banditry reported; Defense Online; Production line	Taiwan Television Enterprise; Taiwan Television Enterprise; Taiwan TV public; Taiwan Television Enterprise; China Television Company; China Television Company; China Television Company; China Television Company; China Television; China Television; China Television
French Chinese Television
Awards:	Today, the Iron Curtain (government propaganda); Arts Nocturne (Social Services); Fuxinggang Commentary (government propaganda); 音樂廳（創作推廣純正歌曲）; 百位博士談國是（政令宣導）; Fishing Friends Club (Social Services); Evergreen Village (community service); Today's Commentary (government propaganda); News forum (government propaganda); News radio (government propaganda); Arts Nocturne (Social Services); Broadcast Comments (government propaganda); Timely (Social Services); Air law (social services); How do you do (Social Services); Stories truths (government propaganda); Miya China (government propaganda); Our words (government propaganda); 持家之道（社會服務）; Self-Corner (Social Services)	Revival Radio - Miaoli Taiwan; Taipei, Taiwan Power Revival Radio; Army Radio Fuxinggang; 軍中播總隊台北台; 軍中播總隊台北台; 軍中播總隊台北台; Broadcasting Corporation of China; Taipei, Taiwan Cheng Sheng Broadcasting Corporation; Taipei, Taiwan Cheng Sheng Broadcasting Corporation; Taipei Broadcasting Station; Taipei Broadcasting Station; Minli Radio; Police Radio Station; Police Radio Station; Police Radio Station; China Radio; Fengming Radio; Acoustic Radio; Air Force Radio; 幼獅廣播電台
Special Awards
Special Awards:	Outstanding performance in psychological operations against bandits; Outstanding performance in psychological operations against bandits; Outstanding performance in promoting universal education; Outstanding performance in promoting pure music events	Central Broadcasting System; Radio Voice of Guanghua Guanghua; Education Radio; Broadcasting Corporation of China
