= 3rd Golden Bell Awards =

1967 Taiwanese radio programming awards

- Date: 26 March 1967 (radio)
- Site: Zhongshan Hall, Taipei, Taiwan
- Organized by: Government Information Office, Executive Yuan

The 3rd Golden Bell Awards (Chinese: 第3屆金鐘獎) was held on 26 March 1967 at the Zhongshan Hall in Taipei, Taiwan.

== Winners ==
Award	Winner	Network
Best News Commentary Award: Special Awards:	匪情分析: 空中論壇──如何達成文藝戰鬥化使命; News Forum; 就事論事	新竹復興電台: Broadcasting Corporation of China台南台; Cheng Sheng Broadcasting Corporation; Police Broadcasting Service
Best News Program: Special Awards:	新聞特寫──誰的責任: 錄音特寫; The wide news coverage; People's voices	Police Broadcasting Service: Broadcasting Corporation of China花蓮台; Broadcasting Corporation of China; The wide news coverage
Best Social service program: Special Awards:	Nine club: 尋人服務; 好農家; 請伸出您的手吧	Broadcasting Corporation of China: Police Broadcasting Service; 民立廣播電台; 正聲公益電台
Best Teaching Program: Special Awards:	Dead Poet's Society: Broadcast in English; 標竿英語; 算術指導	Young Lions Radio: Army China Light Radio; Fuxing Broadcasting Station; 教育廣播電台
Best Family Program: Special Awards:	Family Times; 齊家之道	Radio Voice of Victory; 復興岡軍中電台
Best Children Program: Special Awards:	Children's Paradise: Happy Children; 正聲兒童交誼廳; Cheng Sheng Children Program	Police Broadcasting Service: Broadcasting Corporation of China; 正聲正言電台; Cheng Sheng Broadcasting Corporation
Best Choreographer Award: Special Awards:	張瑞玉 - Happy Child: 韓鋒 - Big Brother and Me; 文從道 - 錄音特寫; 陳煌 and 金培凱 - 反抗運動：打著紅旗反紅旗	Broadcasting Corporation of China: 鳳鳴廣播電台; Broadcasting Corporation of China - 花蓮台; Central Broadcasting System
Best Broadcaster Award: Special Awards:	沈宏毅 - Morning in the Park: Qian Xu - Nine Club; Fang Xiao Hui - Children's Paradise; 王倩伊 - Speak Softly	Broadcasting Corporation of China: Broadcasting Corporation of China; Police Broadcasting Service; Radio Voice of Justice
Best Advertising Award: Special Awards:	百百樂園; Source of Vitality; Punctuality spots	天南廣播電台; Broadcasting Corporation of China; Cheng Sheng Broadcasting Corporation
Best Broadcast in Mainland Award: Special Awards:	反抗運動：打著紅旗反紅旗: Gently Speaking; Red Hate; 立志東飛	Central Broadcasting System: Radio Voice of Justice; Guanghua Kinmen Radio; Air Force Station in Taichung
Best Radio Award: Special Awards:	橘綠橙黃時: Last Forever; Long live President Chiang; 我的座右銘──恆以愛心待人	Revival Radio: Taipei Army Radio; Central Broadcasting System; Taipei Broadcasting Station
Best Music Program Award: Special Awards:	Music Bouquet: 三軍祝壽音樂會; State orchestra; Beautiful Melody	Taipei army radio: Feng Ming Radio; 正聲正言電台; Acoustic Radio
Best Comprehensive Program Award: Special Awards:	Guojun New Literature: Morning in the Park; Brother and I; Liouying scenery	Broadcasting Corporation of China: Feng Ming Radio; 正聲正言電台; Taipei army radio
