= 6th Golden Bell Awards =

1970 Taiwanese radio programming awards

- Date: 25 March 1970 (radio)
- Site: Unite Hotel, Taipei, Taiwan
- Hosted by: Chung Chiao-kuang
- Organized by: Government Information Office, Executive Yuan

The 6th Golden Bell Awards (Chinese: 第6屆金鐘獎) was held on 25 March 1970 at the Unite Hotel in Taipei, Taiwan. The ceremony was hosted by Chung Chiao-kuang.

== Winners ==
Award	Winner	Network
General Awards
Best News Program: Excellence Awards:	News Highlights: Taped reports; 金門行; 遺暉永在	Founding Broadcasting Ltd.: Army Corps Guoguang military broadcasting station; Zhenhua Broadcasting Corporation; Broadcasting Corporation of China - Tainan
Best News Commentary Program: Excellence Awards:	News Forum: 匪情分析座談會; Monthly Forum; 就事論事	Feng Ming Radio: Revival Radio; Broadcasting Corporation of China - Tainan; Police Broadcasting Service
Best Teaching Program Award: Excellence Awards:	Army Dawn: Our garden; Corner Church and State; 軍歌教唱	Radio Voice of Justice: Army Corps Penghu Army Radio Broadcasting; Army Corps Taipei Army Radio Broadcasting; Army Corps Guoguang military broadcasting station
Best Family Program Award: Excellence Awards:	幸福家庭劇場－夫婦四四二: Family Times; 我們的家庭－愛的蓓蕾; Women's magazine	Yi Shi Radio: Radio Voice of Victory; 幼獅廣播電台; Police Broadcasting Service
Best Children Program Award: Excellence Awards:	Kids' Time: 星期兒童時間; Children's World; Poster child	Broadcasting Corporation of China: Army Corps Taipei Army Radio Broadcasting; Broadcasting Corporation of China - Kaohsiung; Acoustic Radio
Best Music Program Award: Excellence Awards:	Revival Radio: 尋人服務; 幼獅天地; Fishermen time	桃園夜譚: Police Broadcasting Service; 幼獅廣播電台; Broadcasting Corporation of China - Kaohsiung
Best Music Award: Excellence Awards:	Air Dynasty; 音樂會剪輯; Music Bouquet	Revival Radio; Broadcasting Corporation of China - Tainan Joint; Army Corps Taipei Army Radio Broadcasting
Best Drama Program Award: Excellence Awards:	Love and Respect: 國恩家慶; Shore Storm; Pay the price for justice	Army Corps Taoyuan Army Radio Broadcasting: Air Force Radio; Revival Radio; Fengming Radio
Best Comprehensive Cultural Program Award: Excellence Awards:	Fuxing Broadcasting Station: 平劇欣賞; The Voice of Local; Chinese Culture Corner	Air Supplement: Police Broadcasting Service; Taipei Broadcasting Station; Broadcasting Corporation of China - Tainan
Best Entertainment Program Award: Excellence Awards:	Talk and Sing: Warm family; Voice of Police; Air Cabaret	Taipei Broadcasting Station: Army Corps Guoguang military broadcasting station; Police Broadcasting Service Kaohsiung Taiwan; Police Broadcasting Service
Best Advertising Program Award Excellence Awards:	Domestics window; Vientiane Hall; Majestic Time	Fengming Radio; Fengming Radio; People Radio
Individual Awards
Best Editor Award: Excellence Awards:	郭婉華 - 翠堤春曉: Cai, 好 - News Highlights; Tang, Ji - Love and Respect; Shen, Jing - Army dawn	民本廣播電台: Jianguo Broadcasting Limited; Army Corps Taoyuan Army Radio Broadcasting; Army Corps Hualien Army Radio Broadcasting
Best Director Award: Excellence Awards:	鄭慶龍 - 巧奪天工: Tang, Ji - Stepfather; Feng Kui Reng - 桃園夜譚; Jin Peikai - 三結合	Broadcasting Corporation of China 嘉義廣播電台: Army Corps Taipei Army Radio Broadcasting; Army Corps Taoyuan Army Radio Broadcasting; Central Broadcasting System
Best Interview Award: Excellence Awards: Special Award:	李伯元 - 金門行: Cai, 好; 曹惠美 - Family Planning; Wang Mei Juan - News Feature; 涂裔輝 - 馬思聰的心	震華廣播股份有限公司: (Award not given after receiving "Editor Award"); Broadcasting Corporation of China - Taiwan; Air Force Radio
Best Broadcast Award: Excellence Awards:	蔡麗蓉（李娟） - 政教園地: Wang Yun Bao, 錢測雲, Qian Shi Ji, Chen Xiaojun - News Archives; Gengzhen Huan - 新聞報導; Yanghui Lan (Liu Qing) - Liu Qing time	Army Corps Taipei Army Radio Broadcasting: Central Broadcasting System; Broadcasting Corporation of China - Taitung; Broadcasting Corporation of China - Taitung
Broadcast in Mainland
Best News Program Award: Excellence Awards:	News Feature: Taped Records; Brood; News Feature	Air Force Radio: Central Broadcasting System; Radio Voice of Justice; Army Corps Penghu Army Radio Broadcasting
Best News Commentary Program	對中共空軍談話: Think; 請聽聽和你們不同的意見; 一週評論	Air Force Radio: Central Broadcasting System; Guanghua Radio; Radio Voice of Justice
Best Comprehensive Cultural Program	Central Radio: Arts World; Frontier situation; Red Hate	對口相聲: Army Corps Hualien Army Radio Broadcasting; Central Broadcasting System; Guanghua Radio
Best Specific Program: Excellence Awards:	和工農朋友談天: Iron Curtain Nocturne; Continental Reconstruction; Guanghua Radio	Radio Voice of Justice: Guanghua Radio; Central Broadcasting System; 剝毛澤東的畫皮
