= 41st Golden Bell Awards =

- Date: December 20, 2006
- Site: Kaohsiung Social Education Hall, Kaohsiung, Taiwan
- Hosted by: Matilda Tao; Tien Hsin
- Organized by: Government Information Office, Executive Yuan

Television coverage
- Network: Azio TV

The 41st Golden Bell Awards (Mandarin:第41屆金鐘獎) was held on December 20, 2006 at the Kaohsiung Social Education Hall in Kaohsiung, Taiwan. The ceremony was broadcast live by Azio TV.

== Winners and nominees ==
Below is the list of winners and nominees for the main categories.

Program/Award	Winner	Network
Radio Broadcasting
Programme Awards
Pop music program award	音樂五六七	Pingtung Broadcasting Corporation
Non-pop music program award	音樂不落地	Cheng Sheng Broadcasting Corporation radio station - Taichung
Education News Program Award	Taiwanese writers: Modern essayist series	Central Broadcasting System
Social Services Program Award	Driving Miss Daisy: Hualien Notes	National Education Radio - Hualien sub-station
Art and Culture Program Award	Freedom Wind Bravo Taiwan	Central Broadcasting System
Comprehensive program award	Weekend big stage	Central Broadcasting System
Radio Drama Award	Sunday radio: 如果不愛	Fu Hsing Broadcasting Station
Best Community Service Award	北回鄉情	Cheng Sheng Broadcasting Corporation radio station - Chiayi
Best local characteristics program award	deep Native Love	Cheng Sheng Broadcasting Corporation radio station - Yunlin Radio
Individual Awards
DJ	Zhang Weibin, Zhang Jing, Wu Chang - "Magical Diary"	Police Broadcasting Service
VJ	Zhang Zhen?, Luo Guiyu - "Hakka Music Hall"	Central Broadcasting System
Education News presenter	Zhou Deren [Chuyun] - "Rondo"	Fu Hsing Broadcasting Station - Kaohsiung Taiwan
Social Services show host award	Wu Caizhang - "Driving Miss Daisy: Hualien Notes"	National Education Radio - Hualien sub-station
Art and Culture Award presenters	Shixiu Fen, Kindi, Lin Qi Macros - "walk with me"	Fu Hsing Broadcasting Station
Comprehensive show host award	趙玉真, Wu Zhengshun [Qi Xuan] - "Music Wizard"	Fu Hsing Broadcasting Station
Best Feature Screenplay Award	冷筱華, Chen Yu Chen Ping - "Taiwan Fairsong"	Fu Hsing Broadcasting Station
Best Engineering Award	冷筱華, Wu Zhengshun [Qi Xuan] - "Music Wizard"	Fu Hsing Broadcasting Station
Advertising Awards
Best Selling Advertising Award	大山無價飲食空間：背叛篇	Cheng Sheng Broadcasting Corporation - Ilan
Best Advertising Award	台呼：從軍．月台篇	新營之聲廣播電台股份有限公司
Radio Award	"Caring for socially vulnerable groups, and promote well-being of society as a whole"	Cheng Sheng Broadcasting Corporation
Radio Marketing Innovation Award	"Taiwan new voice, a large fleet of cross-industry alliance in Taiwan"	Taiwan New Voice Radio Corporation
Special Award	Miss Zhao Jingjuan	
Television Broadcasting
Programme Awards
Drama program Award	Holy Ridge	CTV
Traditional drama program award	The three children, two lamps	PTS
TV marketing year Award	Big Love Theatre: Grass Chunhui	Big Love Satellite TV
Mini-series award	flesh moth	Hakka TV
Educational and cultural programs Contribution Award	Taiwan Road Chi	大麥影像傳播工作室
Information Arts Award	Buddhist Tour	Triple Television Corporation
Community Arts Award	Bigfoot take the world	GTV
Entertainment Arts Award	Variety Big Brother	CTV
Singing Arts Award	Taiwan Spring Breeze	GTV
Individual Awards
Best TV Series Actor Award	Simon Li - "Big Love Theatre: Golden Years"	Big Love Satellite TV
Best TV Series Actress Award	Yang Li-yin - "Big Love Theatre: Grass Chunhui"	Big Love Satellite TV
Best TV Series Supporting Actor Award	Xu Heng - "The Unforgettable Memory"	Pictures Communications Ltd
Best TV Series Supporting Actress Award	沈時華 - "Bump Off Lover"	CTV; GTV
Movie/Mini-series Actor Award	Akio Chen - "happy voyage"	Granville as the International Film Co., Ltd.
Movie/Mini-series Best Actress Award	Lee Lieh- "Internet Love Letter"	Hanaoka Foundation Industrial Foundation
Movie/Mini-series Supporting Actor Award	Ku Pao-ming - "ammunition and knives"	CTV
Movie/Mini-Series Supporting Actress Award	黃采儀 - "flesh moth"	Hakka TV
TV Series Director Award	Feng Kai - "Green Forest, My Home"	SETTV
Movie/Mini-Series Director Award	Lou Yi-an - "happy voyage"	Granville as the International Film Co., Ltd.
Best Directing for Non-Drama Programme	沈可尚 - "Taiwan to the World: Pigeon Game"	Hong Kong Commercial Pacific Star Media Ltd Taiwan Branch
TV Series Screenplay Award	Chen Shijie, Xieshu Fang, Chen Hui Zhen, 陳昭如 - "Bump Off Lover"	CTV; GTV
Movie/Mini-series Screenplay Award	高翊峰、彭心楺 - "flesh moth"	Hakka TV
Information Arts Best Moderator Award	Wu Nien-jen - "These people are those people"	Institute for Public Television Service Foundation
Community Arts Award for Best Moderator	Wong Yat Ping - "Grass champion"	SETTV
Entertainment Arts Award for Best Moderator	Nai-lin, Sam Cheng - "小氣大財神"	CTI
Singing Arts Award for Best Moderator	Peng Zhangcan, 曾新民 - "Gold Club"	SETTV
Photography Awards	Zhang Zhan, Ma Kai, Zhang Yimin, 彭德城 - "Holy Ridge"	CTV
Editing Award	Shi Xiaojun, Li Guohua - "Taiwan to: Spirit Domain Dialogue"	Hong Kong Commercial Pacific Star Media Ltd Taiwan Branch
Sound Award	Wu Jiali - "Bump Off Lover"	CTV; GTV
Lighting Award	韓允中 - "High Fidelity High Heels"	TTV
Art and Design Award	Liu Fook - "Big Love Theatre: moon shines Red"	Big Love Satellite TV
Channel Advertising Awards	true spirit of Taiwan's top series: Kevin Lin articles	FTV
Research and Development Award	Cai Yimin, Wen Feng Ding, Wei Min Fu	Institute for Public Television Service Foundation
