= 8th Golden Bell Awards =

1972 Taiwanese radio and television programming awards

- Date: 26 March 1972 (radio and television)
- Site: Ambassador Hotel, Taipei, Taiwan
- Hosted by: Chang Shu-wen
- Organized by: Government Information Office, Executive Yuan

The 8th Golden Bell Awards (Chinese: 第8屆金鐘獎) was held on 26 March 1972 at the Ambassador Hotel in Taipei, Taiwan. The ceremony was hosted by Chang Shu-wen.

== Winners ==
Award	Winner	Network
Broadcast Excellence Awards
News and Current Affairs Commentary Programs
Best Broadcast Award Excellence Awards:	Taped reports: News (Typhoon News); 財經報導（退出聯合國對我經濟發展是否構成重大妨礙？）; News Feature (free Shining Path); Memorable On October 26; News Feature(今天我們退出了聯合國); News commentary (論毛匪澤東整肅林匪彪的問題); Fuxinggang Commentary (評我們退出聯合國之後)	Army Corps Guoguang radio broadcasting: Police Broadcasting Service; Broadcasting Corporation of China; Army Corps Penghu military broadcasting radio stations; Broadcasting Corporation of China Ilan; Broadcasting Corporation of China Tainan; Radio Voice of Guanghua Guanghua; Xing Gang Radio
Education and Cultural Program
Best Broadcast Award Excellence Awards:	Chinese people's stories: 中國人的故事; Our family - descendants; 歌謠集錦－西藏民謠; Corner Church and State; 共匪暴行資料及大陸反共革命事蹟展覽特別報導; 圓山夜曲	Fuxing Broadcasting Station: Acoustic Radio; Broadcasting Corporation of China; Revival Radio; Army Corps Taipei army broadcast radio; Broadcasting Corporation of China - Hualien; Taipei Broadcasting Station
Arts and Entertainment Program
Best Broadcast Award Excellence Awards:	Frontline Warrior Club; Meilun Yamashita: 「我愛國旗」連續劇(六)－血染國旗; 空中劇場－萬壽橋; Children's playground; 談古說今; Jianqiao Club; 反毛同心會-	Radio Voice of the Golden Gate Guanghua; Broadcasting Corporation of China - Hualien: Army Corps Army China Light Broadcast Radio; Cheng Sheng Broadcasting Corporation - Taipei; Broadcasting Corporation of China - Chiayi; Army Corps broadcasting radio station in Hualien Army; Air radio stations; Radio Voice of Matsu Guanghua
Individual Awards
Best Editor Award	Zhao Qin - Music Tour; Bai Jie - Frontline Warrior Club	Broadcasting Corporation of China; Radio Voice of the Golden Gate Guanghua
Best Choreographer Award	Zhouqiao Yun - Teaching and learning	Broadcasting Corporation of China Chiayi
Best Editorial Award	Mouxi Zong - Taped reports Panning Dong - 共匪暴行資料及大陸反共革命事蹟展覽特別報導	Army Corps Army China Light Broadcast Radio; Broadcasting Corporation of China Hualien
Best Interview Award	莫迺滇 臺益公 - 一個新的反共國家－高棉共和國	China Television Company
Best Broadcast Award	Feng Xiangyun - Meilun Yamashita	Broadcasting Corporation of China Hualien
TV / Innovation Excellence Awards
News and Current Affairs Commentary Program
Best Television Program Award Excellence Awards:	Glorious Giants - 衛星轉播巨人少棒隊勇奪一九七一年世界少棒冠軍實況: 一個新的反共國家－高棉共和國; Today closeup - year-old orphan spring cold probe	China Television Company: China Television Company; China Television
Education and Cultural Program
Best Television Program Award Excellence Award:	得獎節目: High school biology	Broadcasting Corporation of China: China Television
Arts and Entertainment Program
Best Award Excellence Award:	Changbai Mountain: Poison duck	China Television Company: China Television
Innovative Program Award
Best Television Program Award	Hua Huiying - Dragon; Zhai Shi Chun - Heroes OK 鍾能基 - 新型廣播劇《雨過天晴》 任 俊 - The dawn of victory Jiang Wei - Telephone tired brain Zhao Qin - Music Tour; Cai Shifa - Telephone kiosks Qi Zhiping - History of the melody Xiao Baocheng - 生死駌鴦; Jiang Guobin - Peasants and soldiers sing counterparts Lin Shuzhen - Flowers of love	China Television; Police Broadcasting Service; Army Corps Taipei army broadcast radio Army Corps Taipei army broadcast radio Police Broadcasting Service; Broadcasting Corporation of China; Cheng Sheng Broadcasting Corporation radio stations in Chiayi electricity Broadcasting Corporation of China - Tainan; Revival Radio - Taichung; Radio Voice of Guanghua Guanghua; Yunlin Cheng Sheng Broadcasting Corporation Radio
