= 14th Golden Bell Awards =

1978 Taiwanese radio and television programming awards

- Date: 26 March 1978 (radio and television)
- Site: Armed Forces Cultural Center, Taipei, Taiwan
- Hosted by: Ting Mao-shih
- Organized by: Government Information Office, Executive Yuan

The 14th Golden Bell Awards (Chinese: 第14屆金鐘獎) was held on 26 March 1978 at the Armed Forces Cultural Center in Taipei, Taiwan. The ceremony was hosted by Ting Mao-shih.

== Winners ==
Award	Winner	Network
Individual Awards
Best Director Award	Zhang Hongsen - "Your Time"	Taiwan, Taipei, Taiwan Broadcasting Company
Best Interview Award	Lu Lanjun - "jumping Sunshine"	台灣廣播公司台北台
Best Interview Award	Lin Lin - "平交道－街頭廣播時間"	Police Broadcasting Service
Best Editor Award	Guiwen Fei - "beautiful melody"	China Radio
Best Production Award	Chao Ching Juan - "recording closeup - Chungli election harassment truth" Chennai Hui - "News Feature"	Police Broadcasting Service; Air Force Radio
Best Broadcaster Award	West Wei Fang - "Arts Night Talk" 于美麗、國芬、黃凱童、新 - "air posters"	Taipei City Government radio station Guanghua Radio
Best Recording Award	Li Zhengji - "Revival Club"	Hualien, Taiwan Radio Revival
Society Awards
Best Society Awards:	Today Taiwan	Taiwan Television Enterprise
Best Society Awards:	Chinese opera introduction	Taiwan Television Enterprise
Best Society Awards:	Starship	Taiwan Television Enterprise
Best Society Awards:	Wealthy and happy	Taiwan Television Enterprise
Best Society Awards:	Signs of the sound	China Television Company
Best Society Awards:	Continental Truth	China Television Company
Best Society Awards:	Memorable stories	China Television Company
Best Society Awards:	Mind Gymnastics	China Television Company
Best Society Awards:	Let's Talk	China Television Company
Best Society Awards:	Liouying complains	China Television
Best Society Awards:	Liouying complains	China Television
Best Society Awards:	Happy society	China Television
Best Society Awards:	Happy Angel	China Television
Best Society Awards:	南來北往	China Television
Best Society Awards:	Horizon	China Television
Best Society Awards:	Streets	Showtime Broadcasting Corporation
Best Society Awards:	Transport Services	Police Radio Station
Best Society Awards:	Christmas Eve	Police Radio Station
Best Society Awards:	Holidays Corner	幼獅廣播電台
Best Society Awards:	Kiss homes	幼獅廣播電台
Best Society Awards:	Arts Nocturne	Taipei Municipal Radio
Best Society Awards:	News radio	Taipei Municipal Radio
Best Society Awards:	Our Culture	Education Radio
Best Society Awards:	Scientific knowledge	Education Radio
Best Society Awards:	Aspirations Peak	Air Force Radio
Best Society Awards:	The door to victory	Air Force Radio
Best Society Awards:	Today, the Iron Curtain	Revival Radio
Best Society Awards:	Happy family	Revival Radio
Best Society Awards:	Jingwei online	Revival Radio
Best Society Awards:	Revival Corner	Revival Radio
Best Society Awards:	Service Corner	Revival Radio
Best Society Awards:	Arts Nocturne	Revival Radio
Best Society Awards:	Farm World	Revival Radio
Best Society Awards:	Women's family	Revival Radio
Best Society Awards:	Happy Morning	Revival Radio
Best Society Awards:	Health knowledge	Revival Radio
Best Society Awards:	Granitic mountains	Revival Radio
Best Society Awards:	Voice of the fishermen	Revival Radio
Best Society Awards:	Victory music	Army Radio
Best Society Awards:	Our words	Army Radio
Best Society Awards:	Clarify the lakeside	Army Radio
Best Society Awards:	Meilun Stream	Army Radio
Best Society Awards:	A brighter future	Army Radio
Best Society Awards:	Navy drip	Army Radio
Best Society Awards:	Fuxinggang Commentary	Fuxing Broadcasting Station
Best Society Awards:	Chinese people's stories	Fuxing Broadcasting Station
Best Society Awards:	Service hours for fishermen	Voice of Guanghua Guanghua three Kinmen and Matsu
Best Society Awards:	Government and the people	Broadcasting Corporation of China
Best Society Awards:	China complains	Broadcasting Corporation of China
Best Society Awards:	Taiwan Spring	Broadcasting Corporation of China
Best Society Awards:	Vineyard	Broadcasting Corporation of China
Best Society Awards:	Mountain horn	Broadcasting Corporation of China
Best Society Awards:	Matter-	Broadcasting Corporation of China
Best Society Awards:	Talk about local things	Broadcasting Corporation of China
Best Society Awards:	Safe journey	Broadcasting Corporation of China
Best Society Awards:	In all fairness set	Broadcasting Corporation of China
Best Society Awards:	Zhang's time	Broadcasting Corporation of China
Best Society Awards:	Modern Rural	Broadcasting Corporation of China
Best Society Awards:	Time friend	Broadcasting Corporation of China
Best Society Awards:	Carp foothills	Broadcasting Corporation of China
Best Society Awards:	Local Comments	Broadcasting Corporation of China
Best Society Awards:	Today's Commentary	Cheng Sheng Broadcasting Corporation
Best Society Awards:	News forum	Cheng Sheng Broadcasting Corporation
Best Society Awards:	Justice	China Radio
Best Society Awards:	Construction of Three People's Principles and Taiwan	China Radio
Best Society Awards:	Banditry reported	Radio Voice of Victory
Best Society Awards:	Time farmers	Acoustic Radio
Best Society Awards:	Good Morning	People Radio
Best Society Awards:	Healthy Voice	Taiwan's Hsinchu, Taiwan Broadcasting Corporation
Best Society Awards:	The Sound of Success	Successful Radio
Best Society Awards:	Radio Comments	Minli Radio
Best Society Awards:	Fengming night	Fengming Radio
Best Society Awards:	Through thick and thin	Fengming Radio
Best Society Awards:	Provincial done for you	National Sound Broadcasting Corporation
Special Awards
Special Awards	Outstanding performance in psychological operations against bandits Health confidence 蔣公精神與我們同在	Central Broadcasting System; China television station Showtime Broadcasting Corporation
Broadcast Excellence Awards
News and Current Affairs Commentary Programs
Best Broadcast Awards: Excellence Awards:	Recording closeup - Chungli election harassment truth: News Feature; Milestone in the history of the Republic of China Broadcasting; Today's Commentary; Happy celebration regeneration; Leap era	Police Radio Station: Air Force Radio; Broadcasting Corporation of China; Cheng Sheng Broadcasting Corporation; Broadcasting Corporation of China; Cheng Sheng Broadcasting Corporation
Educational and Cultural Programs
Best Broadcast Award: Excellence Awards:	Revival Avenue hardworking people: Your time; Victory Garden; Corner Church and State; Happy Sunday; Our pursuit	Revival Radio - Kaohsiung Taiwan: Taiwan, Taipei, Taiwan Broadcasting Corporation; Radio Voice of Victory; Taipei, Taiwan Broadcasting Army Corps; Broadcasting Corporation of China - Taiwan and Taiwan; 幼獅廣播電台
Popular Entertainment Programs
Best Broadcast Award: Excellence Awards:	Beautiful melody: Chinese Modern Folk; Meilun Yamashita; Concert Hall; Taiwan Nights; Music City	Police Broadcasting Service: Broadcasting Corporation of China; Broadcasting Corporation of China - Hualien Taiwan; Taipei, Taiwan Broadcasting Army Corps; Radio Voice of Victory; Acoustic Radio
Subject-Oriented Awards
Best Broadcast Award: Excellence Awards:	Air posters: 夜靜心聲; 怎麼辦; October's Song; 跳躍的陽光; Iron Curtain Nocturne	Guanghua Radio: Revival Radio; Kinmen Taiwan Guanghua Radio; Broadcasting Corporation of China; 幼獅廣播電台; Matsu Taiwan Guanghua Radio
Television Excellence Awards
News and Current Affairs Commentary Programs
Best Television Award: Excellence Awards:	得獎節目: TTV News; Special Education Special Report	Chinese television production company: Taiwan Television Enterprise; China Television
Education and Cultural Programs
Best Television Award: Excellence Awards:	Love: Political teaching; 週日劇場－里長伯劇場	China Television Company: China Television; Taiwan Television Enterprise
Popular Entertainment Programs
Best Television Award: Excellence Awards:	Splendid Love: Penglai; 梅園春暉	Taiwan Television Enterprise: China Television Company; China Television
Advertising Awards
Radio Advertising Awards
Best Radio Advertising Award: Excellence Awards:	Snow Neutral Soap: Seiko quartz watch; Bee Cafe; Asia Trust; Lai Fu Color Photography	Broadcasting Corporation of China: Broadcasting Corporation of China; Radio Voice of Victory; Cheng Sheng Broadcasting Corporation; Taipei, Taiwan electro-acoustic Broadcasting Corporation
Television Advertising Awards
Best Television Advertising Award: Excellence Awards:	Off Helprin silk essence (harp articles): Yoshiyuki obediently South; Sanyo color TV (Alishan replies); 可口多多冰淇淋; 菲仕蘭奶粉	Off Cape Chemical Company: -; Sanyo Electric Co.; Daly Advertising Co.; Dada TV movie companies
