= 5th Golden Bell Awards =

1969 Taiwanese radio programming awards

- Date: 26 March 1969 (radio)
- Site: Teachers' Hostel, Taichung, Taiwan
- Hosted by: Yen Chen-hsing
- Organized by: Government Information Office, Executive Yuan

The 5th Golden Bell Awards (Chinese: 第5屆金鐘獎) was held on 26 March 1969 at the Teachers' Hostel in Taichung, Taiwan. The ceremony was hosted by Yen Chen-hsing.

== Winners ==
| Award | Winner | Network |
|---|---|---|
| Best News Program Award: With Honors: | The Second Asian Basketball Game Live: Taped reports; 新聞報導; 化雨春風 | Police Broadcasting Service: Army Corps Taoyuan Army Radio Broadcasting; Broadcasting Corporation of China - Taitung; Broadcasting Corporation of China - Tainan |
| Best News Commentary Program Award: With Honors: | 平心而論: Banditry analysis; 就事論事; 台灣省實施九年國民教育空中座談會 | Broadcasting Corporation of China - Tainan: Revival Radio; Broadcasting Corporation of China radio station in Hualien; Broadcasting Corporation of China - Taiwan |
| Best Teaching Program Award: With Honors: | I Love China: Air English Teaching; 英語文摘; 益世國文 | Army Corps Guoguang Military broadcasting station: 幼獅廣播電台; Air Force Radio; 益世廣播電台 |
| Best Family Program Award: With Honors: | 軍眷俱樂部: Liu Qing time; Happy Family; Family Times | Army Corps Taipei Army Radio Broadcasting: Broadcasting Corporation of China - Taitung; Fengming Radio; Acoustic Radio |
| Best Children Program Award: With Honors: | Angel's Song: 漫談國民生活及兒童歌曲欣賞; Children's World; Happy Children | Young Lions Radio: Broadcasting Corporation of China - Miaoli; Broadcasting Corporation of China - Kaohsiung; Broadcasting Corporation of China |
| Best Social Service Program Award: With Honors: | 桃園夜譚: Tracing Service; 幼獅天地; Fishermen Time | Army Corps Taoyuan Army Radio Broadcasting: Police Radio Station; 幼獅廣播電台; Broadcasting Corporation of China - Kaohsiung |
| Best Music Program Award: With Honors: | Musical comedy: Concert Hall; Gao Fengming; Symphony Time | 復興崗軍 Broadcasting Corporation of China - 播電台: Revival Radio; Fengming Radio; Taipei Broadcasting Station |
| Best Drama Program Award: With Honors: | Hero's Tribute: Stepfather; 做好一個中國人; 平劇常識 | Cheng Sheng Broadcasting Corporation: Army Corps Taipei Army Radio Broadcasting; Police Broadcasting Service; 成功廣播電台 |
| Best Entertainment Program Award: With Honors: | 妙語輕歌: Victory Garden; 三軍官兵空中慶生晚會; Eastern Taiwan | Fengming Radio: Radio Voice of Victory; Army Corps Taipei Army Radio Broadcasting; Broadcasting Corporation of China radio station in Hualien |
| Best Comprehensive Cultural Program Award: With Honors: Special Award: | 山城號角: 新文藝號角; This Generation; 安平晚唱; 戰鬥文藝 | Broadcasting Corporation of China - Miaoli: Army Corps Taipei Army Radio Broadcasting; Fengming Radio; Broadcasting Corporation of China - Tainan; 苗栗復興廣播電台 |
| Best Advertising Program Award: With Honors: | Domestics showcase: 口味兒之聲; 瑪俐時間; Cultural Corridor | Fengming Radio: Zhen hua Radio Station; Acoustic Radio; 正聲廣播公司公益廣播電台 |
| Best Broadcast in Mainland Award: With Honors: | 馬思聰的心聲: 共產集團以外的世界; 新聞報導 | Central Broadcasting System: Radio Voice of Justice; Air Force Radio |
| Best News Commentary Program Award: With Honors: | 飛向自由: News Analysis; One week Comments; Chinese culture is everlasting | Air Force Radio: Guanghua Radio; Radio Voice of Justice; Central Broadcasting System |
| Best Comprehensive Cultural Program Award: With Honors: | 戲曲選播: 自由的歡唱; 空軍玫瑰; Red Hate | 光華廣播電台金門台: Guanghua Radio; Air Force Radio; 光華廣播電台馬祖台 |
| Best Specific Program Award: With Honors: | 反抗運動──三結合: Youth create era; Freedom Shining Path; Freedom Shining Path | Central Broadcasting System: Radio Voice of Justice; Army Corps Penghu Army Radio Broadcasting; Army Corps Guoguang military broadcasting station |
| Individual "Editor Award": With Honors: | 文從道 - 化雨春風: Quan Yi Shi - 戲曲選播; 張拓蕪 - 戲曲選播; 馮逵礽 - 桃園夜譚 | Broadcasting Corporation of China: 光華廣播電台金門台; Guanghua Radio; 軍中播音總隊桃園軍中電台 |
| Best Directing Award: With Honors: | 鄭慶龍 - 巧奪天工: Tang Ji - Stepfather; Feng Kui Reng - 桃園夜譚; 金培凱 - 反抗運動──三結合 | Broadcasting Corporation of China: Army Corps Taipei Army Radio Broadcasting; Army Corps Taoyuan military power broadcasting; Central Broadcasting System |
| Best Broadcast Award: With Honors: | Wu Li - Stepfather: Xu Shihong - 平劇常識; 李景光 - 鳳鳴高崗; 陳來英 - 花蓮港 | Army Corps Taipei Army Radio Broadcasting: 成功廣播電台; Fengming Radio; Army Corps Hualien Army Radio Broadcasting |
| Best Interview Award: With Honors: Special Award: | 耿震寰 - 新聞報導: 劉俊發 - 尋人服務; Chen Ying - Hualien Harbor; 劉梅 - 海軍一週; 涂裔輝 - 馬思聰的心聲 | Broadcasting Corporation of China - Taitung: Police Broadcasting Service; Army Corps Hualien Army Radio Broadcasting; Army Corps left camp military broadcasting station; Central Broadcasting System |
