= 9th Golden Bell Awards =

1973 Taiwanese radio and television programming awards

- Date: 26 March 1973 (radio and television)
- Site: Zhongshan Hall, Taipei, Taiwan
- Hosted by: Chiang Yen-shi
- Organized by: Government Information Office, Executive Yuan

The 9th Golden Bell Awards (Chinese: 第9屆金鐘獎) was held on 26 March 1973 at the Zhongshan Hall in Taipei, Taiwan. The ceremony was hosted by Chiang Yen-shi.

== Winners ==
Award	Winner	Network
Broadcast Excellence Awards
News and Current Affairs Commentary Program
Best Broadcast Award Excellence Awards:	華僑之家: Interview Coverage; Hualien closeup; Taiwan News; 臺灣報導; 就事論事; 我們的看法–淨化電視廣告，促進純正節目	Radio Voice of Justice: Yunlin Cheng Sheng Broadcasting Corporation Radio; Broadcasting Corporation of China - Hualien; Guanghua Radio; Broadcasting Corporation of China - Chiayi; Police Radio Station; Army Corps Guoguang military broadcasting station
Education and Cultural Program
Best Broadcast Award Excellence Awards:	說說唱唱–貫徹十項革新指示: 錦繡河山–談大陸年俗; Beautiful Country; 自強之路; Chinese Culture Corner; Morning melodies; Favorite melodies	Taipei Broadcasting Station: Fuxing Broadcasting Station; BBC Sound of Victory; Army Corps Penghu Army Radio Broadcasting; Broadcasting Corporation of China - Tainan; Fengming Radio; Broadcasting Corporation of China
Arts and Entertainment Program
Best Broadcast Award Excellence Awards:	彩虹曲: 生命之歌; Music Pearls of Wisdom; 九三俱樂部; 我為你歌唱; The Voice of Local; 晨間沙龍	Army Corps Taipei Army Radio Broadcasting: 幼獅廣播電臺; Taiwan Provincial Police Radio Station; Broadcasting Corporation of China; Cheng Sheng Broadcasting Corporation Taipei Broadcasting Station; Taipei Broadcasting Station; 成功廣播電臺
Special Program
Best Broadcast Award Excellence Awards:	反毛同心會: 對中共黨政軍人員廣播; 自由光明之路	Radio Voice of Matsu Guanghua: Guanghua Radio; Army Corps Penghu Army Radio Broadcasting
TV / Innovation Excellence Awards
News and Current Affairs Commentary Programs
Best Television Award Excellence Awards:	得獎節目: Jianggui Qin's story	China Television: China Television Company
Education and Cultural Programs
Best Television Award Excellence Awards:	這一年: Children's toys	Taiwan Television Enterprise: China Television Company
Popular Entertainment Programs
Best Television Award Excellence Awards:	Last forever: TTV Theatre; World Freedom Day party battle	China Television Company: Taiwan Television Enterprise; China Television
Innovation Program Award
Best Innovation Program Award Excellence Awards:	任 俊 - 對時插播: Yang Yuzhang - Today; Zhang Liang - 四海一家; West Wei Fang - Film Appreciation; Liu Youcheng - Iron Curtain fax; 劉偉達 - 大有為政府; 曹慕廷 - Gammon ShengJi; 管美綾 - 與我同行; 臺益公 - 超音速英雄; 潘健行 - 從電視看圖識字	Army Corps Taipei military broadcasting station: Taiwan Provincial Police Stations; Broadcasting Corporation of China; Taipei Broadcasting Station; Revival Radio; Broadcasting Corporation of China - Taitung; Radio Voice of the Golden Gate Guanghua; Cheng Sheng Broadcasting Corporation radio station in Taitung; China Television Company; China Television Company
Individual Awards
Best Production Award	Yellow Star - Singers Night 歸 來 - Morning melodies	Taiwan Television Enterprise; Fengming Radio
Best Choreographer Award	Shezhao Bo - A book of Revelation; Zhouqiao Yun - Daughter Circle	Broadcasting Corporation of China - Ilan; Broadcasting Corporation of China - Chiayi
Best Editor Award	Liao Hui - Favorite melodies	Broadcasting Corporation of China
Best Editorial Award	Panning Dong - Hualien closeup	Broadcasting Corporation of China - Hualien
Best Interview Award	Zhang Kishon - Pingtung online Wong Shun - Beautiful Country	Army Corps Kaohsiung Army Radio Broadcasting; Complex and Gang Radio
