= 1st Golden Bell Awards =

1965 Taiwanese radio programming awards

- Date: 10 July 1965 (radio)
- Site: Zhongshan Hall, Taipei, Taiwan
- Hosted by: Yen Chia-kan
- Organized by: Government Information Office, Executive Yuan

The 1st Golden Bell Awards (Chinese: 第1屆金鐘獎) was held on 10 July 1965 at the Zhongshan Hall in Taipei, Taiwan. The ceremony was hosted by Yen Chia-kan.

== Winners ==
Award	Winner	Network
Best News Program Award	今日短評──你說對不對	Cheng Sheng Broadcasting Corporation Voice of Success
Best Live Reporting Award	Chen Cheng	Taipei Broadcasting Station
Best Radio Award	明天	Broadcasting Corporation of China
小說選播優等獎	Sportswear	Widely Chia Yi Taiwan
Best Music Program Award	Country Music Appreciation	Broadcasting Corporation of China
Best Children's Program Award	Children's World	Ilan
Best Comprehensive Program Award	陸光俱樂部	Army Radio
Best Service Program Award	Timely	Police Broadcasting Service
Best Advertising Program Award	Mandarin	Voices Radio
