= 12th Golden Bell Awards =

1976 Taiwanese radio and television programming awards

- Date: 26 March 1976 (radio and television)
- Site: Armed Forces Cultural Center, Taipei, Taiwan
- Organized by: Government Information Office, Executive Yuan

The 12th Golden Bell Awards (Chinese: 第12屆金鐘獎) was held on 26 March 1976 at the Armed Forces Cultural Center in Taipei, Taiwan.

== Winners ==
Award	Winner	Network
Broadcast Excellence Awards
News and Current Affairs Commentary Program
Best Broadcast Award Excellence Awards:	Government and the people: 挺立在風雨中的塑像; The Chinese people on the Baltic Sea; Love and faith; Today's Commentary; News radio	Broadcasting Corporation of China: Broadcasting Corporation of China - Chiayi, Taiwan; Broadcasting Corporation of China; Broadcasting Corporation of China - Taitung, Taiwan; Taipei, Taiwan Cheng Sheng Broadcasting Corporation; Army Corps Guoguang broadcasting station
Education and Cultural Programs
Best Broadcast Award Excellence Awards:	Eternal Giants: Heart Bridge; 一刻心聲－窄門的煩惱; 藝文夜話; Happy Children; Our garden	Taipei Broadcasting Station: Revival Radio - Chiayi; Broadcasting Corporation of China - Chiayi, Taiwan; Taipei Broadcasting Station; Broadcasting Corporation of China; Broadcasting Corporation of China - Taiwan
Popular Entertainment Programs
Best Broadcast Award Excellence Awards:	Music Appreciation: Talk and sing; China complains; Flowers of life; Air Supplements; 新瓶老酒話民謠	Army Corps of Kaohsiung, Taiwan Broadcasting: Taipei Broadcasting Station; Broadcasting Corporation of China; Revival Radio - Hsinchu; Army Radio Fuxinggang; Broadcasting Corporation of China - Miaoli, Taiwan
Special Awards
Special Awards: Excellence Awards:	Freedom Shining Path: Iron Curtain Nocturne; Red Hate; Chiang Kai-shek Hundred Days Festival; Anticommunist novel "hatred"	Taipei, Taiwan Broadcasting Army Corps: The Sound of Matsu Taiwan Guanghua; Voice of Kinmen Taiwan Guanghua; Broadcasting Corporation of China - Overseas Department President; Broadcasting Corporation of China - Overseas Department
Television Excellence Awards
News and Current Affairs Commentary Programs
Best Television Award Excellence Awards:	Dear President universally Mourning - Chiang Kai-shek special program: We are born for victory; Great for the government	Taiwan Television Enterprise: China Television Company; China Television
Education and Cultural Programs
Best Television Award Excellence Awards:	Chinese opera introduction: Ray Music; 我從大陸來，來談大陸事	Taiwan Television Enterprise: China Television Company; China Television
Popular Entertainment Programs
Best Television Award Excellence Awards:	Earth Storm (Concluded): Heroes line (Concluded); Five lights Award (Summer Children Talent Contest)	China Television Company: China Television; Taiwan Television Enterprise
Advertising Awards
Radio Awards
Best Radio Advertising Award Excellence Awards:	伊也舒洗髮粉: China Art Furniture City; Bison jeans; Lamb brand sweater; Kennedy Murray conditioner	Broadcasting Corporation of China: Taipei, Taiwan Cheng Sheng Broadcasting Corporation; Fengming Radio; Voices Broadcasting Corporation; Taipei, Taiwan Cheng Sheng Broadcasting Corporation
TV Advertisement Awards
Best Television Advertisement Award Excellence Awards:	International card stereo radio: Kodak camera; 可樂膚舒乳液; 黑松沙士; Sharp AA Automatic Refrigerator	Panasonic Taiwan Co., Ltd.: Large utility companies century; Mercedes Television Company; 創造企劃公司; Impression Inc.
Special Awards
Special Award for Social Education Excellence Awards:	國際牌安全扇	Panasonic Taiwan Co., Ltd.
Society Awards
TV Program
Social Awards Excellence Awards:	Great building (Government propaganda): Weeks Theater (Social Services); Happy Farm (Social Services); Fragrance Taiwan (Social Services); Mother and baby (Social Services); Sing sing (Pure creative promotional song); Teaching programs (Social services, including air Teaching and political teaching); Good family (Social Services)	Taiwan Television Enterprise: Taiwan Television Enterprise; Taiwan Television Enterprise; China Television Company; China Television Company; China Television Company; China Television; China Television
Broadcast Programs
Social Awards Excellence Awards:	Weekly Review (Government propaganda): News forum (Government propaganda); Agricultural Services Program (Social Services); Air Counsel (Social Services); Transportation Services (Social Services); Music Wind (Pure creative promotional song); Business Time (Social Services); Fuxinggang Commentary (Government propaganda); News radio (Government propaganda); Fishing Friends Club (Social Services); I love China (Social Services); Youth Empowerment special program (Social Services); Women's family (Social Services); Through thick and thin (Social Services)	BBC Sound of Victory: Sound Broadcasting Corporation; Taichung, Taiwan Cheng Sheng Broadcasting Corporation; Taipei Broadcasting Station; Police radio traffic specialist station; Broadcasting Corporation of China; Broadcasting Corporation of China; Army Radio Fuxinggang; Taipei Broadcasting Station; Penghu army radio; Army Corps Guoguang broadcasting station; 幼獅廣播電臺; Revival Radio - Taitung; Fengming Broadcasting Corporation
Individual Awards
Best Editor Award	Sun Jing - Friends of the family Song Yuying - Arts Nocturne	Revival Radio - Ilan; Taipei Broadcasting Station
Best Broadcaster Award	Zhang Li - China complains Li Baogan - Today's Commentary; Lai Shengqing - Our garden	Broadcasting Corporation of China; Taipei, Taiwan Cheng Sheng Broadcasting Corporation; Broadcasting Corporation of China - Tainan and Taiwan
Best Interview Award	門 琪 - Government and the people	Broadcasting Corporation of China China Broadcasting Corporation
Best Producer Award	Zheng Qinglong - 挺立在風雨中的塑像; Chen Bingshu - 自由光明之路	Broadcasting Corporation of China - Chiayi Taiwan; Taipei, Taiwan Broadcasting Army Corps
Special Award
Special Award	Broadcast television programs to promote overseas	China Television
