= 7th Golden Bell Awards =

1971 Taiwanese radio and television programming awards

- Date: 25 March 1971 (radio and television)
- Site: Zhongshan Hall, Taipei, Taiwan
- Hosted by: Wang Hong-jun
- Organized by: Government Information Office, Executive Yuan

The 7th Golden Bell Awards (Chinese: 第7屆金鐘獎) was held on 25 March 1971 at the Zhongshan Hall in Taipei, Taiwan. The ceremony was hosted by Wang Hong-jun.

== Winners ==
Award	Winner	Network
Radio and Television Program Excellence Awards
News and Current Affairs Commentary Programs
Best Broadcast Award: Excellence Awards:	花蓮特寫: World Expo opening ceremony live; News Feature; News Feature; 山胞賽夏族矮人祭; 端正社會風氣 請從國語歌曲著手; 勤勞教民強 節約教民富; 就事論事	Broadcasting Corporation of China: Broadcasting Corporation of China; Broadcasting Corporation of China; 幼獅廣播電台; 台聲廣播電台; Taipei Broadcasting Station; Broadcasting Corporation of China; Police Broadcasting Service
Best Television Program Award: Excellence Award:	釣魚台列嶼巡禮	China Television Company
Education and Cultural Programs
Best Broadcast Award: Excellence Awards:	Morning in the Park: Youth Clubs; Scientific Knowledge; Chinese People's Stories; Talk and Sing; Happy family; The Door to Victory; Happy Song	Broadcasting Corporation of China: 苗栗復興廣播電台; 基隆復興廣播電台; Fu Xing Gang Radio; Taipei Broadcasting Station; Cheng Sheng Broadcasting Corporation; Air Force Radio; BBC Sound of Victory
Best Television Program Award: Excellence Award:	Quiet Metropolis	China Television Company
Arts and Entertainment Program
Best Television Program: Excellence Award	Jubilee	Chinese television company
Best Broadcast Award: Excellence Awards:	Air Dynasty: World of Music; 一二三俱樂部; Music Wind; 父親大人; Music Appreciation; Local Scenery; Folk Art	Police Broadcasting Service: Revival Radio - Taitung; Guanghua Radio; Broadcasting Corporation of China; Feng Ming Radio; Army Corps left camp military broadcasting station; China Radio Broadcasting Corporation Taitung; Cheng Sheng Broadcasting Corporation radio station in Kaohsiung
Best Innovative Program Award: Excellence Awards:	Guo Wanhua - My Wish: 逯 - Sound Classroom; 拾景伸 - 上下五千年; Li Ji Wen - Red Bridge; 錢測雲 - Hunters; Qi Zhi Ping - 大哉中華; Zhang Chu - Bedtime Stories; 胡覺海 - 一聽就會; 張遵禮 - 毛朝外傳; Li Bo Quan - Broadcast Modern Theater; Zhai Shi Chun - Meilun Yamashita	People Radio: Taipei Broadcasting Station; Army Corps Guoguang radio broadcasting; Air Force Radio; Taipei Broadcasting Station; Broadcasting Corporation of China - Taiwan; Taipei Broadcasting Station; Army Corps Taipei Army Radio Broadcasting; Central Broadcasting System; Feng Ming Radio; Broadcasting Corporation of China in Hualien
Individual Awards
Editor Award	潘寧東 - Music Tour 李鳳行 - Folk art Chen Qi - 華夏笙歌	Broadcasting Corporation of China; Cheng Sheng Broadcasting Corporation radio station in Kaohsiung; Broadcasting Corporation of China
Broadcast Award	Liu Yu Jing - Ping Tung Online; Yu Guifang - Banditry Review 谷 禎 臺益公 - 對大陸廣播新聞特寫	Army Corps Kaohsiung Army Radio Broadcasting; Revival Radio - Keelung; Army Corps Penghu Army Radio Broadcasting
Best Dubbing Award	賁秉綱 - 音響教室	Taipei Broadcasting Station
Children's Program Special Award	Zheng Yaru - Children's Song	Broadcasting Corporation of China - Chiayi
