= 4th Golden Bell Awards =

1968 Taiwanese radio programming awards

- Date: 26 March 1968 (radio)
- Site: Zhongshan Hall, Taipei, Taiwan
- Hosted by: Wang Hong-jun
- Organized by: Government Information Office, Executive Yuan

The 4th Golden Bell Awards (Chinese: 第4屆金鐘獎) was held on 26 March 1968 at the Zhongshan Hall in Taipei, Taiwan. The ceremony was hosted by Wang Hong-jun.

== Winners ==
Award	Winner	Network
Best Teaching Program Award: Special Awards:	Our Garden: 柳風英語; 海軍一週; Dead Poet's Society	Army Corps broadcasting / Taipei army radio: Taipei Broadcasting Station; Army Corps broadcasting / left camp army radio; 幼獅廣播電台
Best Family Program Award: Special Awards:	Our Family: 余鳳信箱; Happy Family	Broadcasting Corporation of China: Feng Ming Radio; Min Li Radio
Best Children Program Award: Special Awards:	"Poster child": Cheng Sheng Children Paradise	Acoustic Radio: Cheng Sheng Broadcasting Corporation
Best Radio Award: Special Awards:	我的座右銘──愛與罰: Revival House; 一付眼鏡千滴淚; Motherhood	Taipei Broadcasting Station: Broadcasting Corporation of China; Police Broadcasting Service; Radio Voice of Victory
Best Music Program Award: Special Awards:	Music Wind: Music Garden; 愛國歌曲選播; Music and Music Appreciation ─ National Revival	Broadcasting Corporation of China: Voices Radio; Taipei Broadcasting Station; Revival Radio - Ilan
Best Comprehensive Program Award: Special Awards:	Today Tai Tung: 假日樂園──春聯的啟示; 軍中晨光; 澎湖夜譚	Broadcasting Corporation of China/ Radio Taitung: 新竹廣播電台/軍中播音總隊; Taipei Army Radio; Army Corps Broadcasting / Radio Penghu army
Best Advertising Program Award: Special Awards:	Qinyun Song; Mary Song brocade	Broadcasting Corporation of China; Radio Voice of the People
Best News Commentary Program Award: Special Awards:	復興中華文化大專辯論會: Air Talk; 就事論事; Monthly Review (平心而論)	Broadcasting Corporation of China / Radio Volkswagen forum Taichung: Army Corps broadcasting / Guoguang army radio; Broadcasting Corporation of China / Radio Hualien; Jianguo Radio
Best News Program Award: Special Awards:	民航波音727機意外事件錄音報導: 嚴副總統訪美特別報導; 南京演習實況剪輯; 草寮春暖; Youth Create Era	Police Broadcasting Service: Broadcasting Corporation of China; Army broadcast Corps / 左營軍中電台; Broadcasting Corporation of China / Taichung Radio; Central Broadcasting System
Best Social Service Program Award: Special Awards:	Sunny: 警民的話; Happy Door; 宜蘭縣統一升旗典禮	Fengming Radio: Cheng Sheng Yunlin Radio; Revival Radio - Hualien; Ilan People Radio
