= Kiss Radio =

Kiss Radio may refer to:

- Kiss (UK radio station) in the United Kingdom
- Kiss Radio Taiwan
- CKKS-FM, a radio station in Chilliwack/Abbotsford/Vancouver, British Columbia, Canada

== See also ==
- Kiss the Radio, a South Korean radio program
