= Marco Liao =

Taiwanese television host

- Born: 13 February 1977 (age 48); Taiwan
- Occupation: Television host

Marco Liao (Chinese: 廖科溢; born 13 February 1977) is a Taiwanese television host. Liao has hosted TV travel shows, including Discover The Great Silkroad (2013–2016), Out of Africa (2018) and the current series of The Incredible Hidden Gems for which he won Golden Bell Awards for Best Lifestyle Show Host in 2014 and 2018.

== Hosting ==
- Discover The Great Silkroad "發現大絲路"(2013–2016)
- Out of Africa "我的非洲很有事"(2018)
- The Incredible Hidden Gems "秘境不思溢" (????–present)

== Awards ==
- 2014 Golden Bell Awards: Best Lifestyle Show Host (Discover The Great Silkroad – Season 2)
- 2018 Golden Bell Awards: Best Lifestyle Show Host (The Incredible Hidden Gems – Season 3)
