= 2nd Golden Bell Awards =

1966 Taiwanese radio programming awards

- Date: 26 March 1966 (radio)
- Site: Zhongshan Hall, Taipei, Taiwan
- Hosted by: James Shen
- Organized by: Government Information Office, Executive Yuan

The 2nd Golden Bell Awards (Chinese: 第2屆金鐘獎) was held on 26 March 1966 at the Zhongshan Hall in Taipei, Taiwan. The ceremony was hosted by James Shen.

== Winners ==
Award	Winner	Network
Best News Program Award	新聞特寫──飛向自由	Air Force Radio
Best Social Service Program Award	鳳鳴高岡	Feng Ming Radio
Best Teaching Program Award	English Reading Teaching	正聲公益電台
Best Family Program Award	我們的家庭	Broadcasting Corporation of China
Best Radio Drama Award	泉源	Revival Radio (FHBS)
Excellence Award for Music Program	正聲歌選選播	Cheng Sheng Broadcasting Corporation
Best Comprehensive Program Award	空中早會	Police Broadcasting Service
Best Advertising Program Award	空中早會	Feng Ming Radio
Special Awards
News Program in Mainland	萬眾歡騰慶雙十	Central Broadcasting System
Psychological Warfare Program in Mainland	One Hundred Twenty-Three Club	Guanghua Radio
Head Folk Festival	快樂之門	正聲農民電台
Individual "Editor Award"	李用金 - 誰的錯	
Individual "Broadcaster Award"	白茜如 - 我們的家庭	
