= 11th Golden Bell Awards =

1975 Taiwanese radio and television programming awards

- Date: 26 March 1975 (radio and television)
- Site: Armed Forces Cultural Center, Taipei, Taiwan
- Hosted by: Fredrick Chien
- Organized by: Government Information Office, Executive Yuan

The 11th Golden Bell Awards (Chinese: 第11屆金鐘獎) was held on 26 March 1975 at the Armed Forces Cultural Center in Taipei, Taiwan. The ceremony was hosted by Fredrick Chien.

== Winners ==
Award	Winner	Network
Broadcast Excellence Awards
News and Current Affairs Commentary Program
Best Broadcast Award Excellence Awards:	橫貫公路十五年: 台視新聞（慶祝 總統華誕專輯）; 三冠王的光輝	China Television: Taiwan Television Enterprise; China Television Company
Education and Cultural Program
Best Broadcast Award Excellence Awards:	藍天白雲（塘鵝篇）: Teachers philology; 五線譜; publishing and reading	Taiwan Television Enterprise: China Television; China Television; China Television
Popular Rntertainment Programs
Best Broadcast Award Excellence Awards:	Generation tyrant: 包青天; National Day special program "celebrate"	China Television Company: China Television; Taiwan Television Enterprise
Advertising Awards
Radio Advertising
Best Advertising Award Excellence Awards:	幸福牌身歷聲立體放音機: Ten Ren Tea; Mega Audio Time	Broadcasting Corporation of China - Hsinchu: Fengming Radio; Days of the South Radio
Television Advertising
Best Advertising Award Excellence Awards:	Acacia international brand air conditioners: Shiseido Honey Soap; Pine juice; Lengthy shampoo (a); Ideal brand color pot	Matsushita Electric Corporation of Taiwan: Shiseido Company in Taiwan; 創造企劃公司; Nanchow Chemical Industry Company; Dada TV movie Utilities Company Limited
Individual Awards
Best Production Award	Zheng Qinglong - Hsiao World 唐擴亨 - Chinese home	Broadcasting Corporation of China - Chiayi; Radio Voice of Justice
Best Editor Award	Chang Yan Zhou - Friends of the family Xu Huantang - 北管戲考	Revival Radio; Broadcasting Corporation of China - Miaoli
Best Interview Award	Li Baogan, Zhou Ling, Daniel Lee, Josh Zhang, Zhang Ying Zhen - Self-parade live (common interview) 柯仁愛 - Highway	Broadcasting Corporation of China - Taipei Broadcasting Station; Broadcasting Corporation of China - Taitung
Best Broadcast Award	于西清 - 模範兒童 胡覺海 - 西瀛走廊	Acoustic Radio; Penghu army radio
Best Acting Award	儀 銘 - 包青天]	China Television
Social Service Awards
Social Service Awards:	Great building (government propaganda); Happy Farm (social services}; Zhongxing Village (government propaganda); The road to victory (military education); Today (Social Services); Air Education (Social Services); Refuges (Social Services); Air Legal Adviser (Social Services); Morning in the park (government propaganda); Orchestra (pure creative promotional song); President Wang of the day (faith and love) (government propaganda); Agriculture program (social services); Fengming Gao (government propaganda)	Taiwan Television Enterprise; Taiwan Television Enterprise; China Television Company; China Television Company; China Television Company; China Television Company; Police Radio Station; Police Radio Station; Broadcasting Corporation of China; Broadcasting Corporation of China; Broadcasting Corporation of China - Taiwan; Taichung Taiwan Cheng Sheng Broadcasting Corporation; Fengming Radio
Television Excellence Awards
News and Current Affairs Commentary Programs
Best Broadcast Award Excellence Awards:	Royalton Yamashita - Midas touch: 華僑之家; Fuxinggang Commentary; This generation; 西瀛走廊; Today Commentary	Broadcasting Corporation of China - Hualien Taiwan: Radio Voice of Justice; Army Radio Fuxinggang; Broadcasting Corporation of China - Ilan Taiwan; Army Corps Penghu Taiwan Broadcasting; Taichung Taiwan Cheng Sheng Broadcasting Corporation
Education and Cultural Programs
Best Award Excellence Awards:	Hsiao World: Stone Park; 大圓環; Friends of Revival; Poster child; Aviation Hall	Broadcasting Corporation of China - Chiayi Taiwan: Broadcasting Corporation of China - Hualien Taiwan; Kaohsiung police radio; Revival Radio - Chungli; Acoustic Radio; Air Force Radio
Popular Entertainment Programs
Best Award Excellence Awards:	Music of the Psalms: Legendary Chunxiao (valley springs radio set drama); Music concert in Canton; 北管戲管; Country music time; 中廣樂府樂壇新秀; 迴瀾歌廳–阿美族和他們的歌曲	幼獅廣播電臺: Taipei, Taiwan Broadcasting Army Corps; Broadcasting Corporation of China; Chinese Miao Su Taiwan Broadcasting Corporation; Kaohsiung police radio; Broadcasting Corporation of China; Broadcasting Corporation of China - Hualien Taiwan
Special Awards
Special Awards Excellence Awards:	反毛同心會: 和工農朋友談天; 四海歸心; 留學生家信時間; 特定節目時間; Freedom Shining Path	Radio Voice of Matsu Guanghua: Radio Voice of Justice; Broadcasting Corporation of China - Overseas Department; Broadcasting Corporation of China - Overseas Department; Radio Voice of the Golden Gate Guanghua; Army Corps Taichung, Taiwan Broadcasting
Specific Special Awards
Awards:	Study three-dimensional black edges subtitles invented television broadcast technology; Suppress bandits broadcast, enhance psychological defense; Donations to help in advocating and promoting purification songs	China Television Company Engineering Department; Revival Radio; Lions Clubs International Federation of the Republic of China
