= 10th Golden Bell Awards =

1974 Taiwanese radio and television programming awards

- Date: 26 March 1974 (radio and television)
- Site: Armed Forces Cultural Center, Taipei, Taiwan
- Hosted by: Fredrick Chien
- Organized by: Government Information Office, Executive Yuan

The 10th Golden Bell Awards (Chinese: 第10屆金鐘獎) was held on 26 March 1974 at the Armed Forces Cultural Center in Taipei, Taiwan. The ceremony was hosted by Fredrick Chien.

== Winners ==
Award	Winner	Network
Broadcast Excellence Awards
News and Current Affairs Commentary Program
Best Broadcast Award Excellence Awards:	美崙山下–深山裏的燈塔守護者: "Taiwan International Children's Village" Interview Chungli; Time of presentation - four in the book; China Kaohsiung - Happy Farm; Today Commentary - You say right; Chinese home	Broadcasting Corporation of China - Hualien: Revival Radio; Army Corps Guoguang broadcasting station; Taiwan Broadcasting Corporation; Taipei, Taiwan Cheng Sheng Broadcasting Corporation; Radio Voice of Justice
Education and Cultural Programs
Best Broadcast Award Excellence Awards:	Radio drama - Han Storm: Heartstrings song; South high club; Mountain Music Discussion; 文藝圈–天地一沙鷗; Taichung Transportation Professional program - rain melody	Broadcasting Corporation of China: BBC Sound of Victory; China Kaohsiung, Taiwan Broadcasting Corporation; Broadcasting Corporation of China - Taitung Taiwan; 幼獅廣播電臺; Broadcasting Corporation of China
Arts and Entertainment Programs
Best Broadcast Award Excellence Awards:	玉女歌壇: 幼獅俱樂部–民俗世界; Christmas Eve; 輕音樂欣賞; 迴瀾歌廳–阿美族和他們的歌曲	中國廣播公司: 幼獅廣播電臺; Police Radio Station; Army Corps Hualien Taiwan Broadcasting; Army Corps Hualien Taiwan Broadcasting; Broadcasting Corporation of China - Hualien
Special Awards
Best Broadcast Award Excellence Awards:	Youth create era: Red Hate; 想一想，比一比; 怎麼辦; Voice of Free China - Motherland Morning; 和工農朋友談天	Radio Voice of Justice: The Sound of Matsu Taiwan Guanghua; Air Force Radio; Radio Voice of Guanghua, Guanghua; Broadcasting Corporation of China (Overseas Broadcasting Department)
TV / Innovation Excellence Awards
Innovative Programs
Best Broadcast Award Excellence Awards:	Wen Yin - Ethnic melodies: Leopard Shenglin - Psychological warfare radio; Huang Tao - 金門我與你同在; Shezhao Bo - 我們從那裏來; Hu Desheng - 駕馭歷史、創造明天; 王柏鐺 - Taipei round the clock; Jiang Wei - 一把雨傘; 楊川增 - 晨鐘暮鼓	Broadcasting Corporation of China - Tainan: Revival Radio; Radio Voice of the Golden Gate Guanghua; Broadcasting Corporation of China - Ilan; Broadcasting Corporation of China; Cheng Sheng Broadcasting Corporation - Ilan; Police Radio Station; Air Force Radio
Innovative Programs
Best Broadcast Award	Wang Hsiao-hsiang - Courage to stand up Hua Huiying - 勇敢的站起來	China Television Company; China Television
Individual Awards
Best Production Award	Xu Yuan Yuan - 風雨同舟祝國慶，自強奮鬥興中華	Broadcasting Corporation of China - National General Assembly Special Coverage
Best Editing Award	Guoshou Qin - Red Hate	Radio Voice of Matsu Guanghua
Best Interview Award	Zhang Xiyao - Taiwan International Children's Village Interview	Revival Radio - Chungli
Best Director Award	Zhang Fan, Hou Ying, Xu - Radio drama "Han Feng Yun"; Gu Yingzhe - Galaxy Spin Palace	Qian China Broadcasting Corporation; Taiwan Television Enterprise
Best Broadcaster Award	于曼弟 - 心弦之歌 播音獎 - Radio Comments	BBC Sound of Victory; Minli Radio
Best Dubbing Award	Li Yuxiang	文藝圈–天地一沙鷗
TV / Advertising Awards
Excellent TV Awards News and Current Affairs Commentary Programs
Best Television Award Excellence Awards:	誓師再北伐，誓師再統一的會議: First Asian Athletics Championships Special Report; 新聞分析–談小康計劃	China Television Company: Taiwan Television Enterprise; Taiwan Television Enterprise
Education and Cultural Programs
Best Television Award Excellence Awards:	Happy Farm: 高中二年級國文; 英語入門–鵝媽媽教英語; 出版與讀書	Taiwan Television Enterprise: China Television; China Television; China Television Company
Popular Entertainment Programs
Best Television Award Special Award:	TTV theater - I love my teacher	Taiwan Television Enterprise: Taiwan Television Enterprise, China Television Company, China joint television broadcast
Advertising Awards
Best Radio Award Excellence Awards:	插播廣告–蕾斯夢高級化粧品; 插播廣告–家樂牌立體回聲道唱盤; 得獎節目	Acoustic Radio; BBC Sound of Victory; 得獎單位
Best TV Advertisement Award Excellence Awards:	優等獎; 中國傳統色彩篇; 嬰兒美奶粉（白鷺篇）; 理想牌流理臺（心願篇）; Sony TV	欣欣傳播事業股份有限公司; 達達電視電影公司; 大世紀事業股份有限公司; 達達電視電影公司; 創造企劃股份有限公司
