= Radio Corporation of China =

First radio station in China

Radio Corporation of China (中國無線電公司) was the first radio station in China.

== History ==
It was founded in January 1923 by New Zealander Ernest George Hayward Osborn, but it was not a radio station run by Chinese citizens and was shut down by the Northern warlords before 1927.

== Influence ==
Radio stations became a new communication method, and the first Chinese-run radio station was established in Harbin. It went into operation in October 1926. Privately run stations were established in Shanghai in March 1927.

The technology became vital to the war between the Chinese Communist Party and the Nationalist Party. The first major Chinese radio station established with a legit infrastructure was the Central Broadcasting System in 1928 by the Nationalist Party. The CCP would establish the Yan'an Xinhua Broadcasting Station in 1940.

== See also ==
- Radio in China
- History of radio
