= Golden Bell Award for Best Theme Song =

Award for theme song for a drama series

- Awarded for: Best Theme Song
- Location: Taiwan
- Presented by: Bureau of Audiovisual and Music Industry Development
- First award: 2022
- Currently held by: Leo Wang, Chen Hsien-ching, Jerry Li and Lil Happy Lif3 for "A No is a No" (from Wave Makers) (2023)
- Website: gba.tavis.tw

The Golden Bell Award for Best Theme Song (Chinese: 電視金鐘獎主題歌曲獎) is one of the categories of the competition for Taiwanese television production, Golden Bell Awards. It was introduced in 2022.

== Winners ==
=== 2020s ===
Year	Song title	Series English title	Series original title	Ref
2022; 57th Golden Bell Awards	"Oysters Love Noodles "	The Making of an Ordinary Woman 2	俗女養成記2	
2023; 58th Golden Bell Awards	"A No is a No"	Wave Makers	人選之人 - 造浪者	
2024; 59th Golden Bell Awards	"Finland"	Imperfect Us	不夠善良的我們	
