= Chu Fu-sung =

Taiwanese politician

- 朱撫松

Minister of Foreign Affairs
- In office 19 December 1979 – 22 April 1987
- Preceded by: Chiang Yen-si
- Succeeded by: Ting Mao-shih

ROC Ambassador to South Korea
- In office 10 March 1975 – 1979
- Succeeded by: Ting Mao-shih

Personal details
- Born: 5 January 1915
- Died: 14 June 2008 (aged 93)
- Party: Kuomintang
- Education: Hujiang University (BS); London School of Economics (MSc)

Chu Fu-sung (Chinese: 朱抚松; 5 January 1915 – 14 June 2008) was a Taiwanese politician who served as foreign minister from December 19, 1979, until April 22, 1987. Chu died on June 14, 2008, at the age of 93.
