= Mass media in Taiwan =

The mass media in Taiwan is considered to be one of the freest and most competitive in Asia. Cable TV usage is high (around 80%) and there is also a wide selection of newspapers available covering many political viewpoints.

== Taiwan's media history ==
While Taiwan's media freedom may rank among the top few nations in Asia today, its progress to its current state of vibrancy was not without a struggle. The Japanese occupation of Taiwan from 1895 to 1945 did not slow down the pace of economic modernisation on the island; the Kuomintang (KMT, Nationalist Party) also built on the successes of its predecessors to modernize and this provided the basis for its mass media industry to develop. However, KMT's pursuit of economic progress and democratic ideals did not automatically mean that Taiwan's media could fulfill its role as the fourth estate of democracy, as a check on the government. The martial law era media was kept on a tight leash and the explicit prohibition from enquiring about then-President Chiang Kai-shek, reinforced the culture of deference to KMT politicians even further. It would not be surprising to observe mainstream media's close relations with the KMT regime, as the authoritarian nature of KMT determined media firms' business practices. Taiwanese media was structured to transmit the official ideology decided by the KMT, such as the emphasized Han Chinese identity over Taiwanese identity, in response to political and national security concerns as claimed by the latter. The official media's role in Taiwanese society was to communicate the government's decisions, mobilising people around its agenda and finding ways to work towards meeting the regime's objectives under the close supervision by the Government Information Office.

In an effort to curb dissent, KMT promulgated the Enforcement Rules for the Publications Act in 1952, which effectively banned the establishment of any more new magazines, newspapers and news agencies during Taiwan's martial law era (1949–1987). From 1952 to 1987, there were 31 newspapers in Taiwan, and by 1974, 44 news agencies. Yet this did not seem to prevent dissenting voices from seeking its space in the public sphere and in response, the KMT began employing alternative methods to limit the opposition movement from gaining traction. The authors of material which offends the KMT were subjected to reprisals, where the KMT and government officials repeatedly filed criminal libel and sedition suits against them, which often resulted in jail terms. This period of harsh suppression has also been remembered as the White Terror in Taiwanese history, where high-profile and educated dissidents such as Professor Chen Wen-chen began to disappear. Under such circumstances, alternative radio and television channels continued to thrive in Taiwan as a subversive underground movement to push for democratization, freedom and civil rights, even though they were barred from establishing themselves on official airways. The underground media's status provided a focus for organised and sustained opposition to the KMT-dominated state, where its magazines provided a voice for the politically marginalised Taiwanese since it was not covered by the press ban. Specifically, the underground media brought the lives of KMT politicians under scrutiny and also brought opposition activists to the attention of their audience, familiarising the people with their names and platforms.

This convergence of opposition ideologies in the underground media scene also saw the beginning of an entwinement of interests between both the underground media operators and the main opposition grouping at that time, Tangwai. In a time when cable television was banned, its operators saw the partnership with opposition politicians as mutually beneficial, since cable television can be used as a powerful vehicle to promote the politicians' goals and in return, the operators gain lobbyists for their business goals. The then illegal opposition grouping Tangwai only took its current opposition liberal Democratic Progressive Party (DPP) form in 1986 and even then it was done illegally. Media operators and politicians on both end of the political spectrum forged close relations during the martial law era, with whomever their vested interests lie in and this pattern persisted on to the situation today, albeit in the form of media outlets that are sympathetic to one of the two major parties. The proximity between DPP members and cable television firms suggests that, a patron client relationship was sustained between them at that time. Furthermore, it has been revealed that 20 politicians from the DPP had investments in the operation of 35 pro-DPP cable television systems in 1994. With a common goal and material support for the opposition campaign from the underground media, DPP pressed for greater liberalization of media and civil rights for the people. Yielding under popular pressure and United States, KMT lifted the 38 years of martial law imposed on Taiwan and the DPP became a legal political party in 1989, with cable television legalized with the enactment of the Cable Radio and Television Act.

KMT was not a passive party in this process of negotiation for media liberalization, although it seems slow in responding to the rapidly transforming electronic media environment and that the DPP had an upper hand in the underground media environment. During the review period for the draft cable law, one of the most controversial articles added by the legislature was the ban on political party ownership of cable systems that are critical of KMT. This article could be argued as an effort made towards preserving equality and leveling the playing field for the cable television systems. However, KMT rejected the article and allowed political parties to finance cable systems. Before the enactment of the cable law, KMT has already set up Po-Hsin Multimedia in order to take a share of the cable market upon the enactment of the cable law. Recent reform efforts have seen this gap filled up as the new Radio and Television Broadcasting Law required the government, the political parties and the military to give up their electronic media shareholding by 26 December 2005. Since the legalization of cable television, KMT has lost its power over the industry contrary to what its original expectation of sustaining influence over the medium. With the rapid proliferation of print and broadcast media following liberalisation and the repeal of restrictions on transmitting and receiving cable television broadcasts, the market has taken over the state as the dominant influence over the mass media industry.

An official of President Chen Shui-bian's Cabinet said:"If the public dislikes certain TV channel or radio station which they think is manipulated by a certain party or individual they detest, they simply refuse to watch it or listen to it." The ongoing anti-monopoly dispute involving Want Want China Broadband's proposal to purchase China Network Systems seems to highlight the Taiwanese government's antipathy towards monopolies. If the merger is approved by the National Communications Commission (NCC), the multibillion-dollar deal would allow the Want Want conglomerate to secure 23 percent of Taiwan's cable subscribers and approximately one-third of the overall media market. The diversity of opinion in Taiwanese media is highly regarded by not only the journalist circle but also by the wider public who recognizes its importance in maintaining their society's pluralistic nature.

== Cable television ==
Cable television is prevalent in Taiwan, as a result of cheap subscription rates (typically around NT$550, or US$15 a month) and the paucity of free-to-air television, which comprises about 20 channels. Programming is mostly in Mandarin and Taiwanese, with a few channels in Hakka or English. There are also programs in other foreign languages, mainly east Asian and south-east Asian languages. Miniseries, called Taiwanese drama, are popular. There is a dedicated station for Taiwan's Hakka minority as well as the arrival in 2005 of an aboriginal channel. There are around 100 channels with most stations being dedicated to a particular genre; such as game shows, news, anime, movies, sports and documentaries. Almost all programs are in the original language with traditional Chinese subtitles.

The cable television system comprises around one hundred different channels, ranging from news, sport, variety, game, music, children's, foreign, movie and documentary channels.

The Taiwanese government is promoting digital signal television, provided through a set-top box. The analog signal of air television was turned off on 30 June 2012.

== Radio ==
Radio broadcasting entered Taiwan in 1925 when it was a Japanese colony. In November 1928, a laboratory broadcast was carried out to air the coronation of Emperor Shōwa live, followed on December 22, 1928, by the official launch of the Taipei Broadcasting Station (Taihoku Broadcasting Station) with 1 kW of power. Taiwan's first radio broadcasts was formalized in February 1931 with the creation of the Taiwan Broadcasting Association to run regular, island-wide operations. During World War II, radio programmes ended up reflecting the militaristic policies of the Japanese government and throughout the conflict, radio was an important propaganda weapon of the state.

New civilian-operated radio stations were banned in 1959. When martial law was lifted in 1987, 33 legal radio channels existed, with thirteen state-owned or Kuomintang-run stations most prominent. In the 1990s, several underground radio station were established, many affiliated with the Democratic Progressive Party.

There are many stations across the AM and FM spectrum broadcasting a wide variety of programming. Talk-shows, popular music and classic songs are some of the most frequently heard subjects. Exclusively Taiwanese-language stations have enjoyed a surge in popularity since the end of the martial law era and regulations restricting the use of languages other than Mandarin Chinese.

- Broadcasting Corporation of China - National and regional networks
- Radio Taiwan International - National broadcaster; also beams services to mainland China and the rest of the world with programmes in various languages and Chinese dialects
- International Community Radio Taipei - Taiwan's only national English-language station
- Public Radio System - Government-run; travel, weather, social information
- Hit FM and Kiss Radio Taiwan both play popular Chinese music
- UFO Radio - Second-largest station in Taiwan. Very popular. Plays all different kinds of music such as K-pop, J-pop, and American pop
- Voice of Han - Military Radio Station
- Fuxing Radio - Military Radio Station
- Taipei Broadcasting Station
- National Education Radio

== Newspapers ==
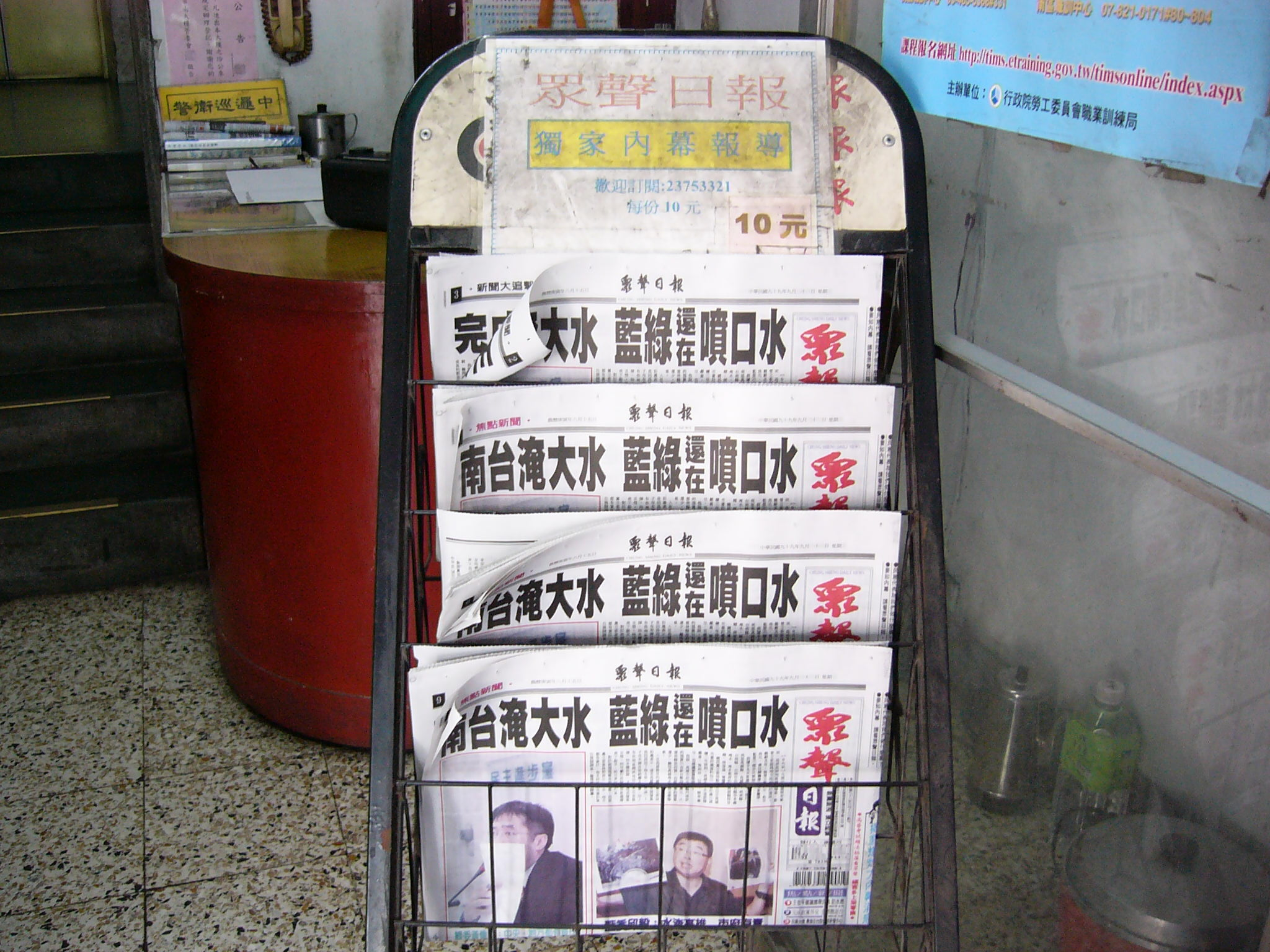
Newspapers in Taiwan

Between 1952 and 1987 the number of papers in Taiwan was a constant 31 as there was a ban on opening new papers. Censorship during this period was heavy with the KMT regime having near total control over the papers. It wasn't until liberalization in 1988 that independent newspapers were allowed to open, by the end of 1988 126 newspapers operated in Taiwan.

Most popular newspapers include:

- China Times (Zhongguo Shibao)
- Liberty Times (Ziyou Shibao)
- United Daily News (Lianhe Bao)

Newspapers in English:

- Taipei Times (Taibei Shibao, Chinese: 台北時報)
- Taiwan Today (Jinri Taiwan, Chinese: 今日台灣)
- The China Post (Yingwen Zhongguo Youbao, Chinese: 英文中國郵報)
- Kaohsiung Times (Kaohsiung Shibao, Chinese: 高雄時報)

Other newspapers:

- Commercial Times (Gongshang Ribao)
- DigiTimes (Dianzi Shibao) - IT industry news
- Economic Daily News (Jingji Ribao)
- Mandarin Daily News (Guoyu Ribao) - Children's newspaper, written with Zhuyin accompanying the text
- Taiwan Times (Taiwan Shibao)
- Youth Daily News, youth civilians and military daily newspaper

Ceased publication:

- Apple Daily (Pingguo Ribao)
- Central Daily News (Zhongyang Ribao)
- China Times (Night) (Zhongshi Wanbao)
- Independence Evening Post (Zili Wanbao)
- Min Sheng Bao (Min Sheng Bao)
- Taiwan Daily (Taiwan Ribao)

== Magazines and periodicals ==
In 1988, there were only about 3,400 magazine publishers in the country. Today, the number has been rapidly increasing to 4,827 (by August 2006). Magazines are various in different contents, including business, politics, entertainment, languages, lifestyle, technology, health, cooking, automobiles, women, education, traveling etc.

== Internet ==
Taiwan is one of the most wired places in the world - broadband or cable modem access is relatively cheap and fast. In 2005 there were 13.8 million internet users and 2.8 million webhosts in Taiwan (for a total population of 22.9 million). A popular feature of even small towns are internet cafes (Chinese: 網咖, Pinyin: wǎngkā), which are open 24-hour and sell a variety of food and drink so that the mainly teenage online gamers who inhabit them do not have to stray too far from their monitors. Taiwan websites use the .tw domain.

Despite the high Internet coverage in Taiwan, online-only newspapers are unfamiliar to the general public. Research by the Taiwan Media Watch Foundation (財團法人台灣媒體觀察教育基金會) in 2019 discovered that 66.8% of all interviewees do not read online-only newspapers, and almost half of all interviewee who has read online only newspapers said they only read one online newspaper.

Taiwan has some online newspapers available. Some of the most common media are:

- Credere Media (信傳媒) (Chinese)
- Focus Taiwan (English, Japanese, Spanish)
- Mirror Media (鏡週刊) (Chinese)
- Newtalk (新頭殼) (Chinese)
- NOWnews (今日新聞) (Chinese)
- Taiwan News (臺灣英文新聞) (Chinese, English)
- The News Lens (關鍵評論網) (Chinese, English, Japanese)
- The Reporter (報導者) (Chinese, English in partial)
- The Storm Media (風傳媒) (Chinese)
- Up Media (上報) (Chinese)

== Media environment ==
Taiwanese mass media and its staff have rather a poor reputation. The general public rated Taiwanese mass media as a whole at 5.58/10 in 2019. Cédric Alviani, Asia-Pacific Bureau Director of Reporters Without Borders, indicated that Taiwanese mass media has suffered from political polarization, sensational reporting, and absolute power of the owners within a media. In a 2022 Reuters Institute survey, Taiwan ranked last among democracies in the Asia-Pacific region on people's level of trust in media, at a 28% trust rate.

Due to rapid change and quick development, the media in Taiwan has been in a competitive environment. Covering a market of 23 million people, the country has 8 twenty-four-hour news stations (compared to 3 in the US, 3 in the UK, and 3 in Japan), approximately 200 radio stations, about 2,500 newspaper publishers, and more than 4,000 magazine publishers; moreover, Taiwan also has the highest density of Satellite News Gathering (SNG) trucks in the world: 23 million people are served by 82 trucks, compared to 120 million/71 in Japan, 7 million/1 in Hong Kong, 48 million/40 in Korea, and 1 billion/300 in India.

== See also ==
- Culture of Taiwan
- Taiwanese drama
- Taiwan Public Television Service Foundation (PTS)
- Television in Taiwan
- Censorship in Taiwan
- Press Freedom Index
