= National Education Radio (Taipei) =

National Education Radio 國立教育廣播電台
- Taiwan
- Broadcast area: Taiwan

Ownership
- Owner: Ministry of Education

History
- Founded: 29 March 1960

Technical information
- Transmitter coordinates: 25°1′56.79″N 121°30′41.16″E

Links
- Website: ner.gov.tw

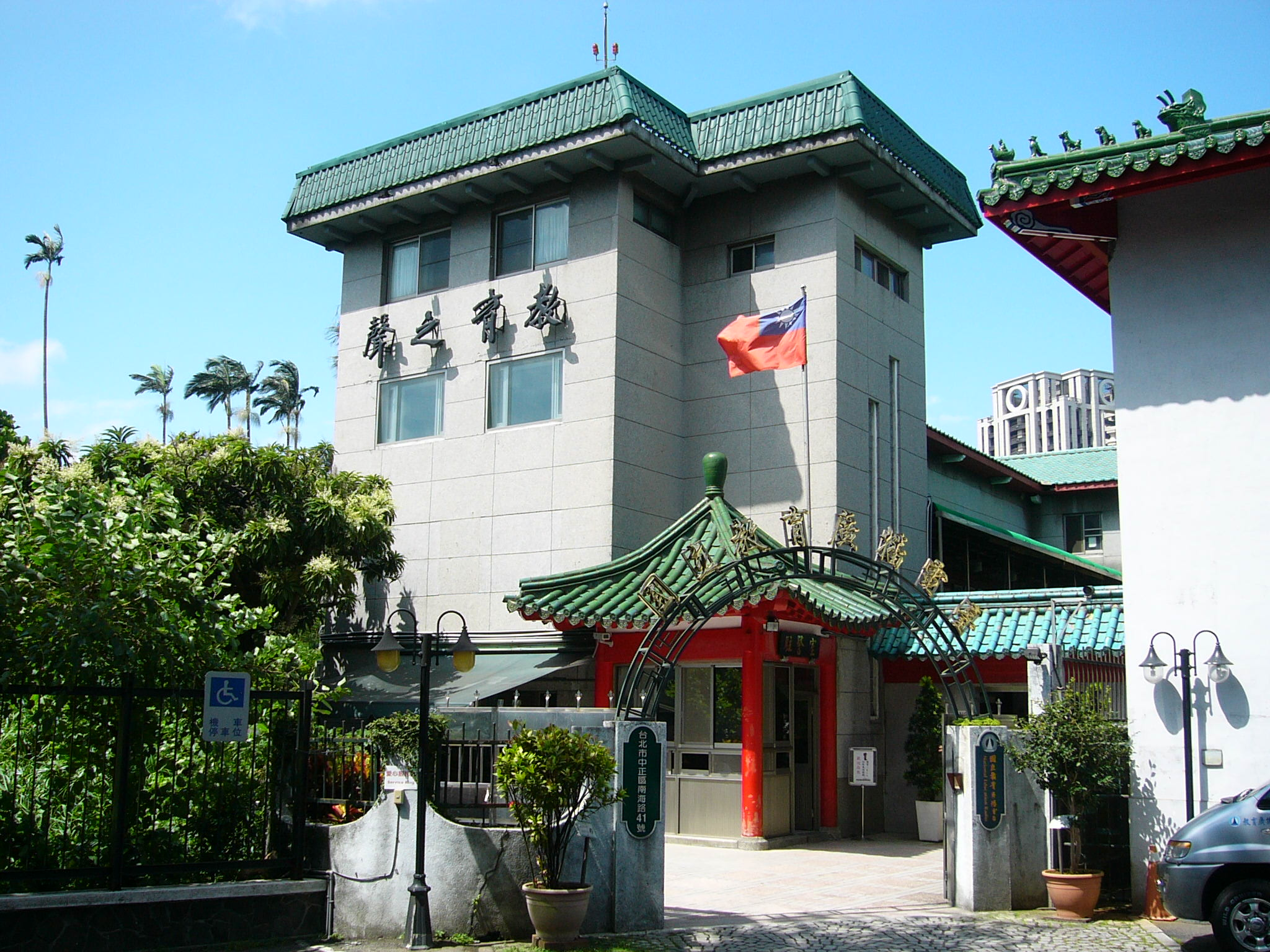
National Education Radio

The National Education Radio (NER; Chinese: 國立教育廣播電台; pinyin: Guólì Jiàoyù Guǎngbō Diàntái) is a government owned radio station in Taiwan and is located in the Zhongzheng District of Taipei City, Taiwan next to the Taipei Botanical Garden and National Museum of History.

== History ==
The radio station was founded on 29 March 1960. The Headquarters building has been a registered historic landmark since 2009.

== See also ==
- Ministry of Education (Taiwan)
- Education in Taiwan
- Press Freedom Index
- Censorship in Taiwan
- Media of Taiwan
