= Kiss Radio Taiwan =

Radio station in Kaohsiung, Taiwan

KISS Radio
Kaohsiung; Taiwan
- Frequencies: Internet Live Streaming; 99.9 MHz (Kaohsiung)

Programming
- Format: Mandopop and English top 40

Ownership
- Owner: Kiss Radio FM 99.9 Co. Ltd.

Links
- Website: www.kiss.com.tw

KISS Radio in Taiwan plays the latest Chinese music and some English, Japanese and Korean top 40 songs. There is live streaming from the station in Kaohsiung.

== History ==
KISS Radio was launched on 14 February 1995. KISS Radio is the first legal private FM radio station in Kaohsiung.

== Programs ==
- Kiss Morning - a news and music program during the morning hours in Taiwan. In the U.S. and Canada, this broadcast would occur sometime around 7 p.m. Eastern Time.

== List of "KISS Radio" Taiwan stations ==
Taiwan Kiss Radio Stations
Frequency	Region
99.9 FM	Kaohsiung City, Pingtung County

== See also ==
- Media of Taiwan
