= Azio TV =

- Traditional Chinese: 年代東風
- Simplified Chinese: 年代东风
- Literal meaning: Era East Wind
Transcriptions
Standard Mandarin
- Hanyu Pinyin: niándài dōngfēng

Azio TV
- Country: Taiwan, Singapore, Malaysia
- Broadcast area: Taiwan
- Network: Era Television

Programming
- Picture format: SDTV 576i (4:3) and HDTV 1080i (16:9)

Ownership
- Sister channels: Yoshimoto Azio

History
- Launched: 11 September 2001

Links
- Website: http://aziotv.eracom.com.tw

Availability

Streaming media
- I'm TV (Taiwan): (Taiwan)

Azio TV (Chinese: 年代東風), also known as Asia Plus or Xingya, is a satellite cable channel operated by Era Television in Taiwan. The station has a Taiwan-specific channel and an "Asian market" channel. which provides broadcasting through pay TV in Hong Kong, Vietnam, Singapore, Malaysia and Indonesia.

== See also ==
- Media of Taiwan
