= Ting Mao-shih =

Taiwanese diplomat and politician (1925–2025)

- 丁懋時
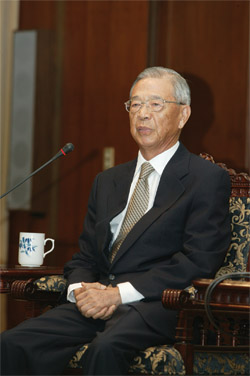
- Ting in 2008

Secretary-General to the President
- In office 23 December 1999 – 19 May 2000
- Preceded by: John Chiang
- Succeeded by: Chang Chun-hsiung

Secretary General of the National Security Council
- In office 1 September 1994 – 31 January 1999
- Preceded by: Shih Chi-yang
- Succeeded by: Yin Tsung-wen

Taiwanese Representative to the United States
- In office 25 August 1988 – 8 September 1994
- Preceded by: Fredrick Chien
- Succeeded by: Benjamin Lu

Minister of Foreign Affairs
- In office 22 April 1987 – 20 July 1988
- Preceded by: Chu Fu-sung
- Succeeded by: Lien Chan

ROC Ambassador to South Korea
- In office 1979–1982
- Preceded by: Chu Fu-sung
- Succeeded by: Xue Yuqi

Minister of the Government Information Office
- In office May 1975 – January 1979
- Preceded by: Fredrick Chien
- Succeeded by: James Soong

ROC Ambassador to Zaire
- In office 1967–1971

ROC Ambassador to Rwanda (Charge d'affaires until 1964)
- In office 1962–1967

Personal details
- Born: 10 October 1925; Yuanan, Yichang, Hubei, China
- Died: 15 September 2025 (aged 99); Taipei, Taiwan
- Political party: Kuomintang
- Education: University of Paris (PhD)

Ting Mao-shih (Chinese: 丁懋時; pinyin: Dīng Màoshí; 10 October 1925 – 15 September 2025) was a Taiwanese diplomat and politician.

== Life and career ==
Ting attended the University of Paris and began working for the Central News Agency in 1956. He left two years later for the Ministry of Foreign Affairs and began his diplomatic career. He was named a special adviser to the president after Chen Shui-bian was elected to the office in 2000, but chose to retire via resignation in August of that year. Ting served on a committee set up to investigate the 3-19 shooting incident of 2004, and was an adviser to Chen's successor Ma Ying-jeou starting in 2011.

Ting died in Taipei on 15 September 2025, 25 days short of his 100th birthday.
