= Fu Hsing Broadcasting Station =

Taiwanese radio station

Coordinates: 25°5′13.15″N 121°31′41.63″E

Fu Hsing Broadcasting Station 復興廣播電台
- Type: Radio network
- Branding: Voice of Revival
- Country: Taiwan
- Availability: National, through regional substations.
- Owner: Ministry of National Defense
- Launch date: 1957
- Official website: Fuxing Radio

Fu Hsing Broadcasting Station (FHBS; Chinese: 復興廣播電台; pinyin: Fùxīng Guǎngbō Diàntái) is a state-run radio station sponsored by the Republic of China Armed Forces, located on the campus of Ming Chuan University in Taipei, Taiwan, and is operated by the Ministry of National Defense. Its website is currently blocked in the People's Republic of China.

== History and overview ==
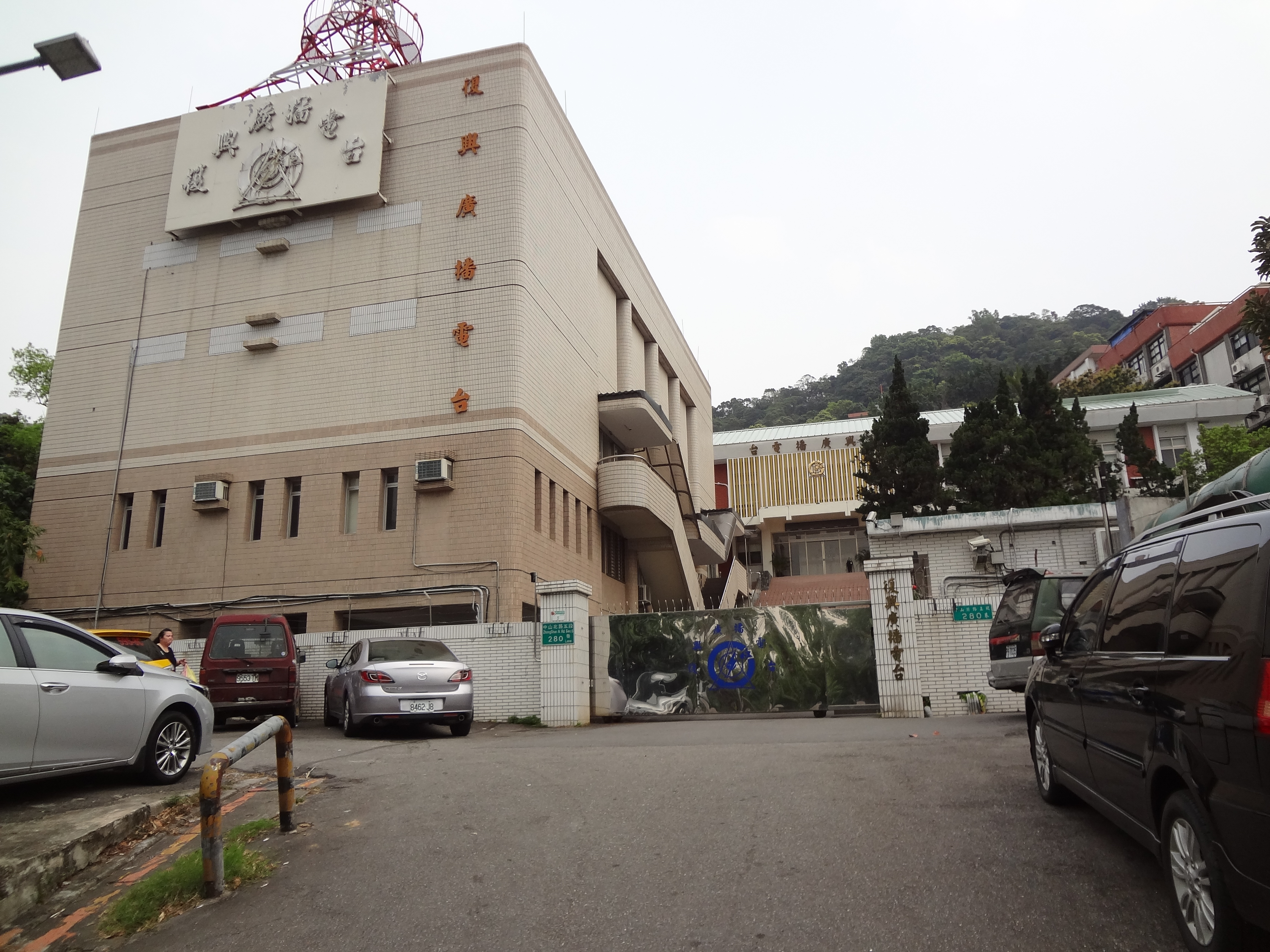
Fu Hsing Broadcasting Station headquarters

Fu Hsing Broadcasting Station was founded on 1 August 1957, with units in Taipei, Taichung, and Kaohsiung. The station currently operates two radio networks. The first network acts as a "cross-strait" information service for domestic audiences. The second network and a shortwave network provides mainland Chinese audiences with propaganda about the Republic of China (Taiwan).

== Frequency ==
=== Taipei ===
- AM558, 909 kHz, the second radio network: AM594, 1089 kHz

=== Taichung ===
- FM107.8 MHz (10 KW 24h); second radio network: AM594, 1089 kHz

=== Kaohsiung ===
- AM594 kHz (10 KW 24h), the second radio network: AM846 kHz

=== Mainland China ===
- HF Net: 9410, 9774, 15375 kHz (10 KW) From UTC 0500 - 0900

== See also ==
- Media in Taiwan
- Radio Taiwan International
- Propaganda in the Republic of China
  - Voice of Han
- Cross-Strait war of propaganda
  - China National Radio
  - Voice of the Strait
