= Taipei Broadcasting Station =

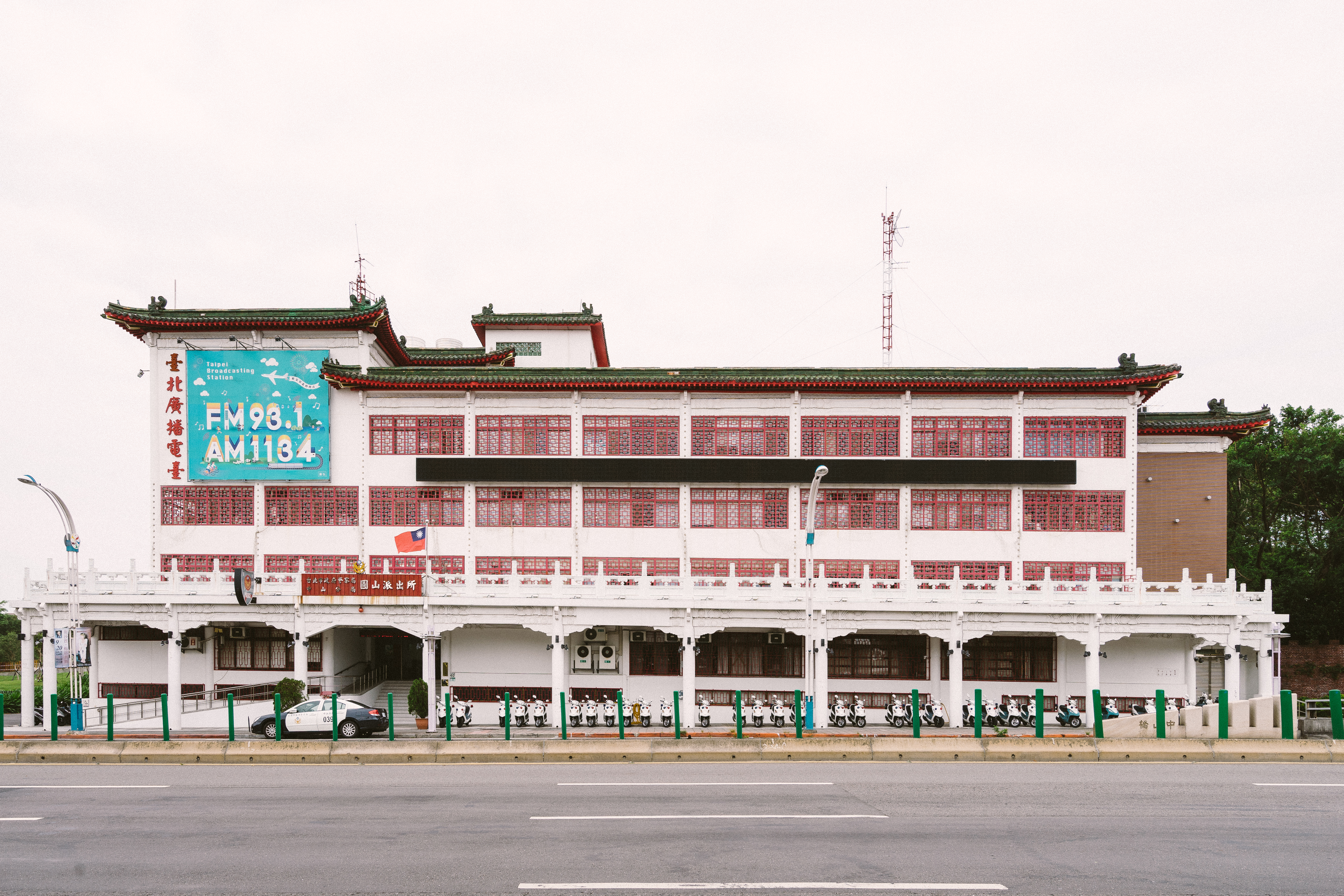

Ownership
- Owner: Taipei City Government

History
- First air date: 7 July 1961

Technical information
- Transmitter coordinates: 25°4′22.56″N 121°31′25.72″E

Links
- Website: tbs.gov.taipei

Taipei Broadcasting Station or Radio Taipei (TBS; Chinese: 臺北廣播電臺; pinyin: Táiběi Guǎngbō Diàntái) is a state-owned radio station in the Republic of China (Taiwan). It has been in operation since 7 July 1961 under the direction of the Department of Information and Tourism, Taipei City Government. It is located in Taipei City, Taiwan directly across from the Taipei Fine Arts Museum.

== History ==
In 1961, the station's original purpose was City Civil Defense Radio (民防廣播電台) broadcasting under the control of the Taiwan Garrison Command to coordinate air defense against a People's Liberation Army attack. Later, in 1972 the station was renamed Taipei City Civil Defense Radio (台北市民防廣播電台) and came under control of the Taipei City Government. In 1977, Taipei City Government renamed the station Taipei City Government Radio (台北市市政廣播電台).

== Organizational structure ==
- Programming Section
- Engineering Section
- General Affairs Section
- Accounting Office
- Personnel Office

== Radio frequency ==
The station's coverage includes Taipei, Hsinchu, Taoyuan, Keelung, Yilan, and other places.

- AM 1134
- FM 93.1

== See also ==
- Media in Taiwan
