= Broadcasting Corporation of China =

Radio broadcasting company in Taiwan

- Official logotype of Broadcasting Corporation of China, from 2013

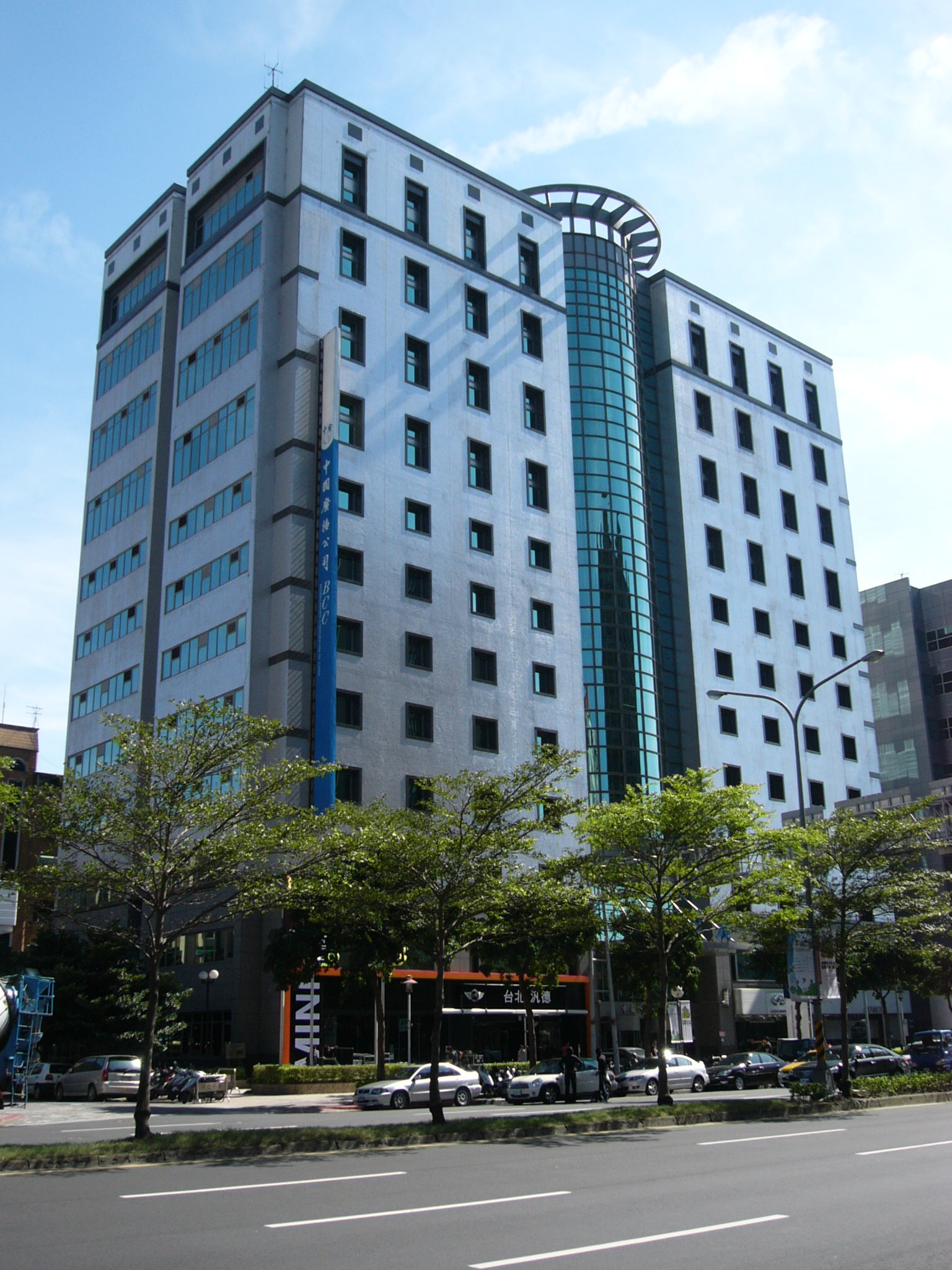
- BCC Songjiang Building in Taipei
- Type: Radio network
- Country: Taiwan
- Headquarters: Taipei, Taiwan
- Launch date: 1 August 1928; 98 years ago
- Official website: www.bcc.com.tw

Broadcasting Corporation of China
- Traditional Chinese: 中國廣播公司
- Simplified Chinese: 中国广播公司
- Tongyong Pinyin: Jhōngguó Guǎngbō Gōngsīh
Transcriptions
Standard Mandarin
- Hanyu Pinyin: Zhōngguó Guǎngbō Gōngsī
- Wade–Giles: Chungkuo Kuangpo Kungszu
- Tongyong Pinyin: Jhōngguó Guǎngbō Gōngsīh
- IPA: [ʈʂʊ́ŋkwǒ kwàŋpwó kʊ́ŋsɹ̩́]
Southern Min
- Hokkien POJ: Tiong-yang Kóng-pò; Kong-si

The Broadcasting Corporation of China (BCC) is a broadcasting company in the Republic of China (also known as Taiwan). It was founded as the Central Broadcasting System in Nanjing in 1928.

== History ==
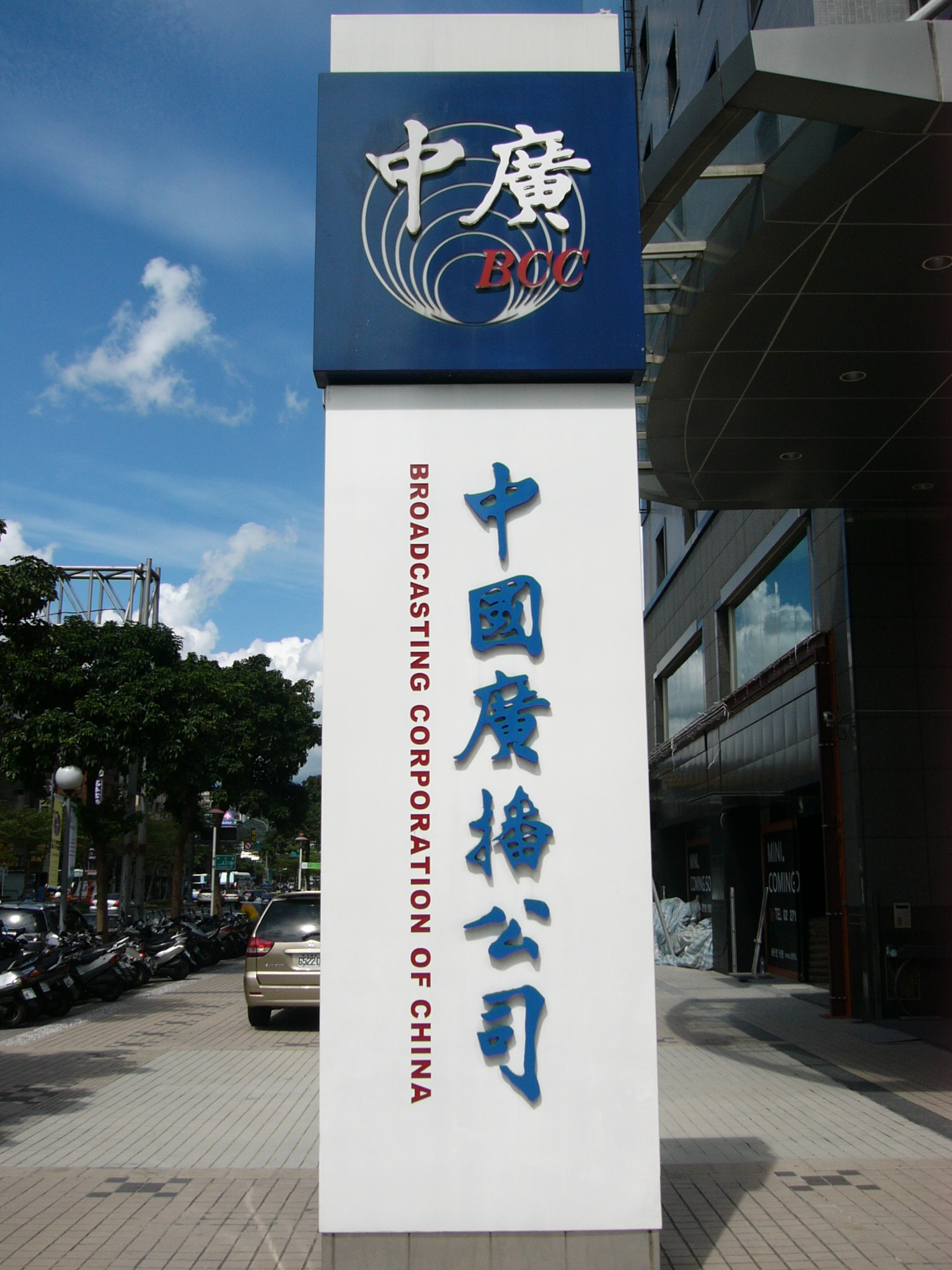
BCC Songjiang Building milestone

The Central Broadcasting System is considered the first Chinese-run radio station with a legitimate infrastructure. The first station in the Republic of China, however, was the 1923 Radio Corporation of China. It was originally based in Harbin. However, since the Radio Corporation of China was originally owned by Radio Corporation of America, the Chinese government shut it down.

CBS was originally established by the Chinese Nationalist Party. It made its first broadcast in 1928 with the call sign of XKM, and later changed to XGOA. The station became the central point with multiple stations established in other major cities. The infrastructure was significant in controlling airwave communication and any spread of propaganda. In 1935, it formed a musical ensemble for the broadcast of Chinese traditional music, which is considered to be the first Chinese orchestra formed.

The name was changed to "Broadcasting Corporation of China" in 1947. BCC was moved to the island of Taiwan, a former Japanese colony ruled from 1895 to 1945, in 1949 when the Kuomintang government was defeated in the Chinese Civil War.

In 2005, following the government's policy to remove political and military influences from the media, BCC was privatized and sold to a holding company in the China Times Group at a price of NT$9.3 billion. In December 2006, BCC was sold, via the KMT-owned Hua Hsia Investment Holding Company, to a group of four holding companies linked to Jaw Shaw-kong. The National Communications Commission approved the sale in June 2007. Shortly after, Jaw was accused of attempting to build a media monopoly, and the Executive Yuan withdrew its approval. The Fair Trade Commission fined Jaw's other media company, UFO Network, in December 2007 for not reporting the BCC acquisition. The sale was eventually approved in April 2008, after Jaw's wife cut her share in the UFO Network down to 10%. In 2016, the Ill-gotten Party Assets Settlement Committee launched an investigation into the sale of the BCC. The committee announced its findings in 2019, stating that its probe determined that BCC was a Kuomintang affiliate.

== Present ==
Today, it is a privately owned company under a Government contract, and it also has the most radio network services in Taiwan.

Their music-focused i-radio, formerly as FM radio network, was later converted as online radio station following the controversy. Most of their FM frequency (both BCC Country Network and i-radio) was instead carried by government-supervised Hakka Radio and Alian Radio respectively.

== See also ==
- Media of Taiwan
- China National Radio
- China Central Television
