= Government Information Office =

Taiwanese government agency

Government Information Office, Executive Yuan
- 行政院新聞局; Xíngzhèng Yuàn Xīnwén Jú
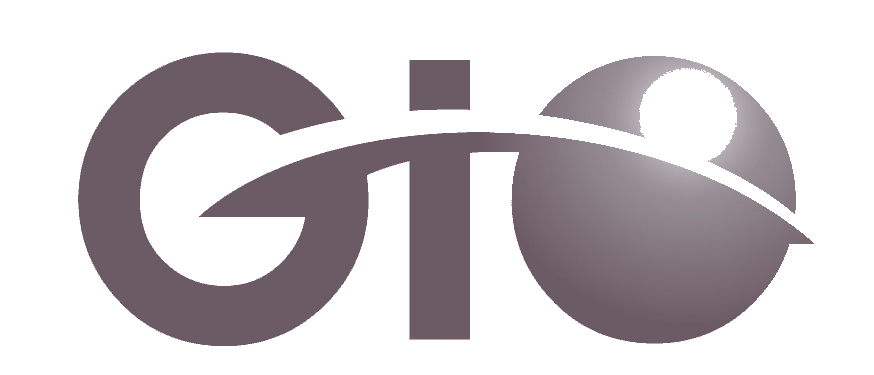

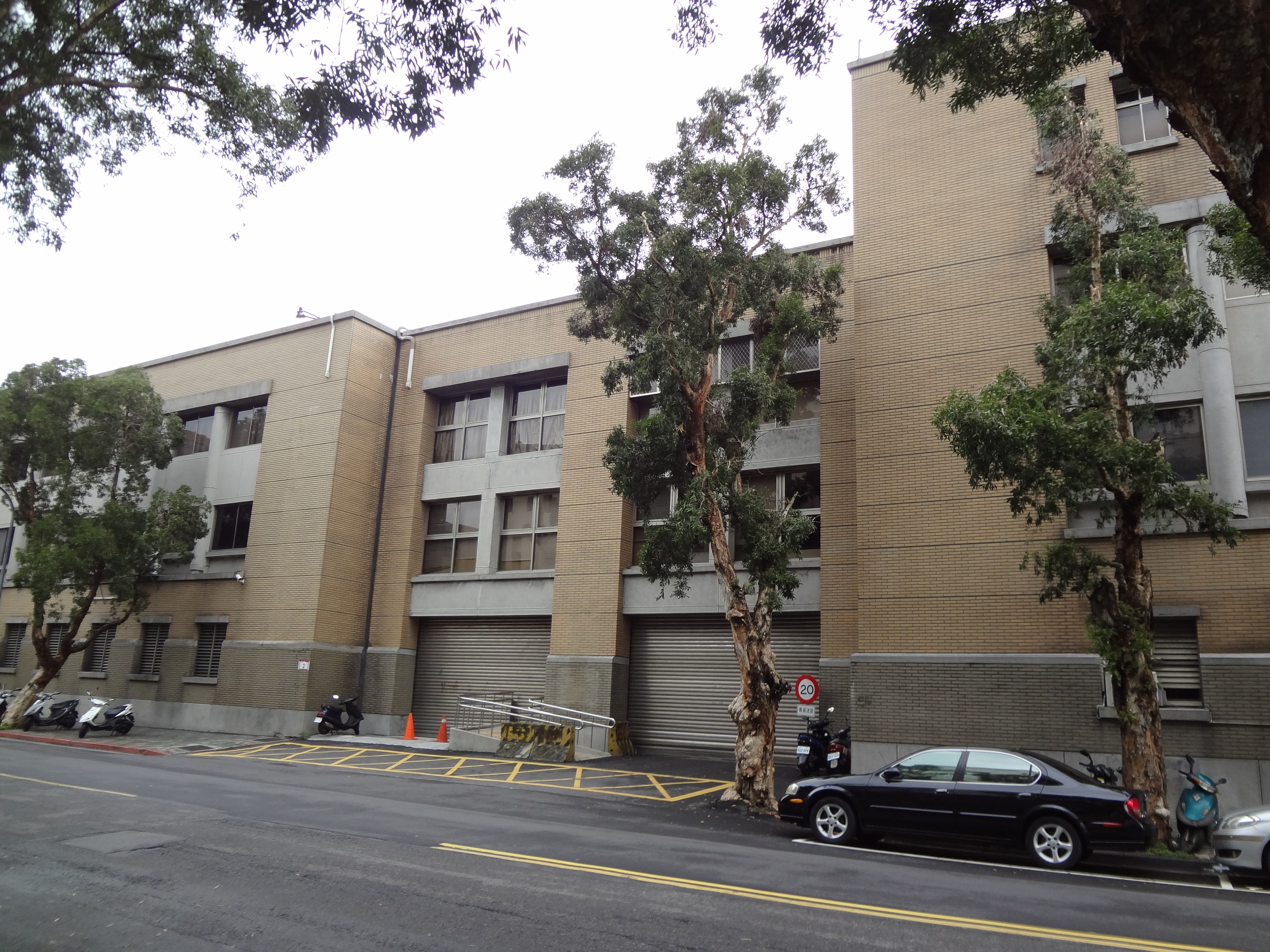

Agency overview
- Formed: 2 May 1947
- Dissolved: 20 May 2012
- Jurisdiction: Taiwan
- Headquarters: Nanjing (1947–1949) Taipei (1949–1950, 1954–2012)
- Parent agency: Executive Yuan
- Website: www.gio.gov.tw

The Government Information Office, Executive Yuan (GIO; Chinese: 行政院新聞局; pinyin: Xíngzhèng Yuàn Xīnwén Jú) was a cabinet-level agency of the Executive Yuan of Taiwan in charge of promoting government policies and regulating domestic media.

== History ==
In April 1947, the Republic of China government completed all preparations for the implementation of constitutional rule and made the transition from the stage of political suzerainty to that of constitutional government. All ministries, commissions and councils under the Executive Yuan were expanded, and on 23 April, the Executive Yuan created the Government Information Office and agencies for health, irrigation and land affairs. The GIO was formally inaugurated in Nanjing on 2 May 1947, and the Department of International Publicity, originally under the Ministry of Information of the Kuomintang, was placed under it.

On 21 March 1949, then President Chiang Kai-shek promulgated the revision of Articles 3 and 5 of the Organic Law of the Executive Yuan, whereby the organisation of the Yuan was streamlined and all agencies were regrouped under eight ministries, two councils and one department. The GIO was dissolved, and the Executive Yuan Council approved at its 52nd session the establishment of an Information Department under the General Secretariat of the Executive Yuan on 5 April 1949. Twenty days later, the headquarters of the Information Department was transferred to Canton along with the central government.

Following the Chinese Civil War and further relocation of the central government to Taipei, Taiwan in December 1949, the Information Department was dissolved in March 1950. On 24 April, the Executive Yuan ordered the establishment of a temporary institution, the Office of Government Spokesman, which was responsible for making press releases.

The original GIO was reactivated on 1 January 1954, in response to changes at home and abroad. In August 1973, the GIO became responsible for matters pertaining to the mass media, originally carried out by the Ministries of the Interior and Education and other related institutions. In addition to its domestic and international information tasks, the GIO assumed responsibilities for publication affairs, motion picture affairs, as well as television and radio broadcasting.

The GIO was formally dissolved on May 20, 2012, with its International Information Department folding into the Ministry of Foreign Affairs and its Domestic Information Department falling under the direct jurisdiction of the Cabinet.

== Taiwan Info ==
Taiwan Info is a French-language online daily that was published by the Government Information Office of the Republic of China until it got dissolved on May 20, 2012. It is now published by the Ministry of Foreign Affairs of the Republic of China. Its purpose is to keep French-speaking readers around the world informed of what takes place in the island-nation.

=== History of the site ===
Taiwan Info was launched in April 2002 to replace Les Echos de la République de Chine, a printed bulletin that had been published every 1, 11 and 21 of the month since its establishment on October 20, 1968. It was finally transformed into an online daily to better reflect current situations of the country and to respond to increasing use of internet around the world.

=== Content of the site ===
The site can be regarded as a window on Taiwan for French-speaking readers. In the 'La une' page, the headlines of 3 local newspapers, today's photo story together with 5 to 10 news are presented concisely everyday except weekends and public holidays. A variety of news are selected by the editors team to meet French speaking readers' interests. News releases are classified under 8 different topics : Politics (Politique), Cross-Straits Relations (Deux rives), Economic and Social Issues (Eco-Social), International, Society (Société), Science, Environment (Environnement) and Culture.

== List of director-generals ==
=== Establishment in Nanjing ===
- Hollington Tong 2 May 1947 – December 1948
- Shen Chang-huan December 1948 – January 1949

=== Relocation to Taipei ===
- Wu Nan-ju January 1954 – February 1956
- Sherman Shen February 1956 – July 1961
- James Shen July 1961 – November 1966
- James Wei November 1966 – June 1972
- Fredrick Chien June 1972 – May 1975
- Ting Mao-shih May 1975 – January 1979
- James Soong January 1979 – September 1984 (acting until June 1979)
- Chang King-yuh September 1984 – April 1987
- Shao Yu-ming April 1987 – September 1991
- Jason Hu September 1991 – 10 June 1996
- Su Chi 10 June 1996 – 15 May 1997
- David Lee 15 May 1997 – 5 February 1998
- Chen Chien-jen 5 February 1998 – 30 November 1999
- Chao Yi 30 November 1999 – 20 May 2000
- Chung Chin (鍾琴) 20 May 2000 – 6 October 2000
- Su Cheng-ping (蘇正平) 6 October 2000 – 1 February 2002
- Arthur Iap 1 February 2002 – 1 July 2003
- Huang Huei-zhen 1 July 2003 – 20 May 2004
- Lin Chia-lung 20 May 2004 – 13 March 2005
- Pasuya Yao 13 March 2005 – 25 January 2006
- Cheng Wen-tsan 25 January 2006 – 20 April 2007
- Yi Rong-zong (易榮宗) 20 April 2007 – 11 June 2007 (acting)
- Shieh Jhy-wey 11 June 2007 – 20 May 2008
- Vanessa Shih 20 May 2008 – 31 December 2008
- Su Jun-pin 31 December 2008 – 24 December 2010
- Johnny Chiang 24 December 2010 – 1 May 2011
- Philip Yang 1 May 2011 – 19 May 2012

== See also ==
- Censorship in the Republic of China
- Propaganda in the Republic of China
