= Born for the Spotlight =

2024 Taiwanese television series

- Promotional poster

Chinese name
- Traditional Chinese: 影后
Transcriptions
- Genre: Drama
- Written by: Yen Yi-wen; Kitten Huang
- Directed by: Yen Yi-wen
- Starring: Hsieh Ying-xuan; Cheryl Yang; Hsueh Shih-ling
- Country of origin: Taiwan
- Original language: Mandarin
- No. of seasons: 1
- No. of episodes: 12

Production
- Producer: Ding Chang-yu
- Running time: 42–59 minutes
- Production company: Third Man Entertainment

Original release
- Network: Netflix
- Release: 7 November 2024

Born for the Spotlight (Chinese: 影后) is a 2024 Taiwanese drama series directed and co-written by Yen Yi-wen. Starring Hsieh Ying-xuan, Cheryl Yang, and Hsueh Shih-ling, the series revolves around the stardom of actresses in Taiwan’s entertainment industry. The series consists of 12 episodes and had its world premiere of the first three episodes at the 29th Busan International Film Festival, followed by a release on Netflix on 7 November 2024.

== Premise ==
The series centers on the story of multiple starlet actresses and the sisterhood between Chou Fan and Hsueh Ya-chih, who were once close friends but parted ways after Hsieh faded out of showbiz to become a producer while Chou remained onscreen.

== Cast ==
=== Main ===
- Hsieh Ying-xuan as Hsueh Ya-chih, an actress-turned-artist manager
- Cheryl Yang as Chou Fan, an acclaimed but washed-up actress
- Hsueh Shih-ling as Lee Tzu-chi, a director and Ya-chih's husband
- Annie Chen as Hsin-ni, a beauty who began her career with an adult/erotic film
- Cherry Hsieh as Ko Li-fen, a veteran soap opera actress
- Yang Kuei-mei as Yu Yen-fang, an acclaimed veteran actress whose family live in the United States
- Chung Hsin-ling as Ms. Chubby, Ai-ma's first manager
- Vicky Tseng as Pan Yin-yin, a diva and lead actress of a zombie movie
- Suri Lin as Shih Ai-ma, a young starlet
- RD Huang as Gecko, Yin-yin and Yu Yen-fang's agent
- Zhan Huai-yun as Liu-mang (Tseng Ya-hsin), a bellboy at the hotel where Chou Fan stays

=== Recurring ===
- Chan Tzu-hsuan as Ms. Pumpkin, the daughter of a notable showbiz family who was forced to debut in acting
- Angel Lee as TB, Ko Li-fen's daughter, Pumpkin's ex-girlfriend and writer of her directorial debut feature
- Wes Lo as Chang Po-lei, Hsin-ni's secret boyfriend and heir to family business
- Rosen Tsai as Chen Wei-jen, Ai-ma's boyfriend
- George Chen as Sega, a dance teacher and Gecko's love interest
- Chen Chia-kuei as a die-hard fan of Chou Fan

=== Special appearances ===
- Blue Lan as an actor in Lee Tzu-chi's film
- Liu Kuan-ting as a wannabe actor and Chou Fan's one-night stand.
- Sara Yu as Liu-mang's mother
- Eleven Yao as Chang Po-lei's fiancée
- Jack Yao as a co-star of Ko Li-fen

=== Guest ===
- Lou Yi-an as Liu, a perverted film director
- Duan Chun-hao as Chang Kuo-lung, Yin-yin's ex-husband
- Michael Huang as Wang, a media tycoon and Pumpkin's father
- Jake Hsu as Director Wang, a renowned director and Pumpkin's elder brother
- Fu Lei as Jen Ke-chien, a former co-star and lover of Yen-fang
- Chu Chung-heng as Tang Fu-sheng, Li-fen's husband and TB's father
- Honduras as Ma Yi-ren, a veteran agent succeeding Gecko
- Phil Hou as Sun, a demanding comedy director

In addition, Sun Ke-fang, the wife of Liu Kuan-ting, made a cameo appearance in a photograph as a co-star alongside Liu's character.

== Production ==
=== Development ===
Director and writer Yen Yi-wen conceived the screenplay based on her own acting career after winning awards and interviewed several fellow award-winning actresses during the early stages of screenwriting. The screenplay was presented at the 2022 Taipei Golden Horse Film Project Promotion, where it received the Catchplay Development Award. The series is set to be produced by Third Man Entertainment, with Kitten Huang attached as co-writer. Hsieh Ying-xuan and Cheryl Yang were cast in the lead roles prior to the 57th Golden Bell Awards later that year. The series was officially announced for production in early April 2023, with Yang Kuei-mei and Cherry Hsieh joining the cast. In February 2024, Netflix announced that it had acquired the series, along with a projected release date of 2024. Hsueh Shih-ling, Annie Chen, Chung Hsin-ling, Vicky Tseng, Chloe Lin, RD Huang, and Zhan Huai-yun were announced as the remaining ensemble cast in March. An official trailer was released on 29 August.

=== Filming ===
Principal photography began in late April 2023, with location shooting taking place at a nightclub in Zhongshan District, Taipei, on 27 April, where Yen Yi-wen, Cheryl Yang, and Liu Kuan-ting were spotted on set. Filming also took place at Illume Taipei on 26 May, featuring Vicky Tseng and RD Huang, and concluded in mid-July.

== Release ==
Born for the Spotlight consists of 12 episodes, and the first three episodes were screened at the 29th Busan International Film Festival in October 2024, marking its world premiere, followed by a release on Netflix on 7 November.

== Reception ==
Joel Keller of Decider gave a positive review of Born for the Spotlight, finding it "fun to see all of these women acting and interacting" and "watch them all navigate what seems like an even more cutthroat environment than Hollywood is", which delivers "an amiable charm that comes from the friendship between its leads and the chemistry that comes with it". Berton Hsu, writing for The News Lens, compared the series to director Yen Yi-wen's previous work The Making of an Ordinary Woman (2019–2021), noting that rather than reusing a "family comedy style", Born for the Spotlight is "full of experimental and postmodern avant-garde techniques", resulting in a "breakthrough" through the series' "large and glamorous cast" and "narrative complexities and visual texture".

Kwok Ching-yin of Esquire found the series to be "compelling" and praised its "strong" cast, particularly the performances of Cheryl Yang and Hsieh Ying-xuan, although he noted that there are some "over-the-top performances" and the dialogues are "sometimes too forceful" and "quite unnatural". Wang Tin-yu, writing for CommonWealth Magazine, offered a rather critical review, lamenting that "the biggest challenges for the female characters in the series remains revolving around men" and it "did not directly challenge the social constructs", writing that "if Born for the Spotlight could explore more intermediate areas, such as finding a balance between oneself, career, and family under structural pressure, or even challenging gender discrimination in the workplace; through these explorations, it can not only evoke more resonance among female viewers but also make the gender issues explored by the series more convincing".

== Awards and nominations ==
Year	Award	Category	Nominee	Result	Ref.
2025	7th Asia Contents Awards & Global OTT Awards	Best OTT Original	—N/a	Nominated	
2025	7th Asia Contents Awards & Global OTT Awards	Best Supporting Actress	Chung Hsin-ling	Nominated	
2025	7th Asia Contents Awards & Global OTT Awards	Best Newcomer Actress	Suri Lin	Won	
2025	60th Golden Bell Awards	Best Television Series	—N/a	Won	
2025	60th Golden Bell Awards	Best Directing for a Television Series	Yen Yi-wen	Won	
2025	60th Golden Bell Awards	Best Writing for a Television Series	Yen Yi-wen, Kitten Huang	Nominated	
2025	60th Golden Bell Awards	Best Leading Actress in a Television Series	Suri Lin	Nominated	
2025	60th Golden Bell Awards	Best Leading Actress in a Television Series	Cheryl Yang	Won	
2025	60th Golden Bell Awards	Best Leading Actress in a Television Series	Hsieh Ying-xuan	Nominated	
2025	60th Golden Bell Awards	Best Supporting Actor in a Television Series	RD Huang	Nominated	
2025	60th Golden Bell Awards	Best Supporting Actress in a Television Series	Vicky Tseng	Won	
2025	60th Golden Bell Awards	Best Supporting Actress in a Television Series	Hsieh Chiung-hsuan	Nominated	
2025	60th Golden Bell Awards	Best Supporting Actress in a Television Series	Chung Hsin-ling	Nominated	
2025	60th Golden Bell Awards	Best Cinematography for a Drama Series	Chou Yi-Hsien	Nominated	
2025	60th Golden Bell Awards	Best Editing for a Drama Series	Lin Cheng-Hung	Nominated	
2025	60th Golden Bell Awards	Best Costume Design for a Drama Series	Jewel Yeh	Nominated	
2025	60th Golden Bell Awards	Best Sound Design for a Drama Series	Joseph Yeh, Tsai Tu-Yi	Nominated	
2025	60th Golden Bell Awards	Best Score for a Drama Series	Chris Hou	Nominated	
2025	60th Golden Bell Awards	Most Popular Drama Series	—N/a	Won	
2025	8th Asian Academy Creative Awards	Best Drama Series	—N/a	Nominated	
2025	8th Asian Academy Creative Awards	Best Actress in a Leading Role	Cheryl Yang	Nominated	
