= Golden Bell Special Contribution Award =

Taiwanese television award

Special Contribution Award
- Awarded for: Contribution to Taiwanese television production
- Location: Taiwan
- Presented by: Bureau of Audiovisual and Music Industry Development
- First award: 1980
- Currently held by: Ting Chiang (2023)
- Website: gba.tavis.tw

The Special Contribution Award (Chinese: 電視金鐘獎特殊貢獻獎) has been awarded by the Golden Bell Awards since 1980.

== Winners ==
=== 2020s ===
Year	Recipient	Ref
2020; 55th Golden Bell Awards	Xiao Fengxian	
2020; 55th Golden Bell Awards	Lin I-hsiung	
2021; 56th Golden Bell Awards	Jen Li-yu	
2022; 57th Golden Bell Awards	Chen Chun-tien	
2022; 57th Golden Bell Awards	Money Zhang	
2023; 58th Golden Bell Awards	Ting Chiang	
