= 58th Golden Bell Awards =

2023 Taiwanese television awards

- Promotional poster for the 58th Golden Bell Awards
- Date: Television show categories - October 20, 2023; 17:00 NST (red carpet); 19:00 NST (awards ceremony) Drama series categories - October 21, 2023; 17:00 NST (red carpet); 19:00 NST (awards ceremony)
- Site: Sun Yat-sen Memorial Hall, Taipei, Taiwan
- Hosted by: Television show categories - Chen Ya-lan and Esther Liu Drama series categories - Chung Hsin-ling
- Preshow hosts: Television show categories - Huang Hao-ping and Pa Yu Drama series categories - Yang Shiau-li and Emerson Tsai
- Organized by: Bureau of Audiovisual and Music Industry Development

Highlights
- Most awards: Mad Doctor, Copycat Killer, Wave Makers, and Shards of Her (4 wins each)
- Most nominations: Copycat Killer (17 overall nominations)

Television coverage
- Network: Sanlih E-Television (host network; cable & digital); Public Television Service (terrestrial)
- Duration
- Ratings

The 58th Golden Bell Awards (Chinese: 第58屆金鐘獎) took place on October 20, 2023 and October 21, 2023 at the Sun Yat-sen Memorial Hall in Taipei, Taiwan. The ceremonies were televised by Sanlih E-Television. Nominees were announced on September 14, 2023.

== Winners and nominees ==
Below is the list of winners and nominees for the television award categories. Winners are listed first and highlighted in boldface.

=== Special Contribution Award ===
**Special Contribution Award**
**recipient(s)**
- **Ting Chiang**

=== Television Show ===
==== Program Awards ====
**Best Variety Show**: **Best Variety Show (最強綜藝秀)**; FeatChill (FeatChill フィーチャ); The Rappers 2 (大嘻哈時代2); Atom Boyz (原子少年 ATOM BOYZ); Hot Door Night (綜藝大熱門)	**Best Reality or Game Show**: **Let's Open (來吧！營業中)**; A Wonderful Word (一字千金 筆武大匯); Hey Girls, Adventure! (老少女奇遇記); Mr. Player (綜藝玩很大); Welcome My Home 1 (歡迎光臨等你來家1)
**Best Lifestyle Show** Viva La Vita (我在工場拍拍手)	**Best Natural Science Documentary Show** Formosa (天選之島)
**Best Humanities Documentary Show** Inspiration from the Southeast (南國啟示錄)	**Best Children Show** Call Me Wild Child (叫我野孩子)
**Best Youth Show** O News TV (小O事件簿)	**Best Animated Show** The Adventure of Yumin and Yuma (樹人大冒險)

==== Individual awards ====
**Best Host in a Variety Show**: **Jacky Wu, Chen Han-dian and Lulu Huang Lu Zi Yin — Hot Door Night (綜藝大熱門)**; Jacky Wu and Sandy Wu — Super Entourage (小明星大跟班); William Shen and Melody Yin — Chop Chop Show (11點熱吵店); Hu Gua, Wu Yi-pei and Lai Hui-ru — Best Variety Show (最強綜藝秀); Bowie Tsang and Lulu Huang Lu Zi Yin — Music Viva Viva 5 (姐妹們的音樂萬萬歲)	**Best Host in a Reality or Game Show**: **Sam Tseng — A Wonderful Word (一字千金 筆武大匯)**; Zax Wang, Wu Han-chun, Tony Sun, Jason Hsu and Mini Tsai — The Hunger Games (飢餓遊戲); Jacky Wu, Kid and Hsieh Kun-da — Mr. Player (綜藝玩很大); Matilda Tao, Henry Hsu, Kuo Shu-yao, Wayne Huang and Tsao Yu-ning — Hello Puppy (哈囉！毛小孩); Yang Kuei-mei, Chung Hsin-ling and Yen Yi-wen — Hey Girls, Adventure! (老少女奇遇記)
**Best Host in a Lifestyle Show**: **Wang Hao-yi and Liu Ka-shiang — Slow Travel Adventures (浩克慢遊)**	**Best Host in a Natural Science and Humanities Documentary Show**: **Chen Ming-chang and Hsiao Shih-wei — Listen Taiwan Sing (聽！台灣在唱歌)**
**Best Host in a Children and Youth Show**: **Wang Po-yuan — Yi Yang Bu Yi Yang (一樣不一樣)**

==== Technical Awards ====
**Best Directing for a Television Show** Chang Hao-jan — Solo Song (公視紀實 - 獨弦之歌)	**Best Television Director** Joyce Wu — Atom Boyz (原子少年)
**Best Cinematography for a Television Show** Chang Hao-jan — Solo Song (公視紀實 - 獨弦之歌)	**Best Editing for a Television Show** Liao Ching-wen — Mirror Doc (另一種注目 - 我討厭我的名字)
**Best Sound Design for a Television Show** Donghee Lee — Ndaan Mpmaduk (入山)	**Best Lighting for a Television Show** Wu Yu-lin, Luo Lin-xuan and Wu Cheng-han — The Rapper (大嘻哈時代2)
**Best Art Direction for a Television Show** Joey Wang, Kuo Chia-lin and 2Dogg — The Rapper (大嘻哈時代2)

=== Other Award ===
**Creative Award for a Television Show**: **A Song For You (為你唱情歌)**; FeatChill (FeatChill フィーチャ); Classical Music (沒事別聽古典樂); Stay True (回到小學那1天); Dream Dream Family (換個爸媽過幾天)	**Most Popular Variety Show** **(Public-voted)** Hunger Games (飢餓遊戲)

=== Drama Series ===
==== Program Awards ====
**Best Television Series**: **Mad Doctor (村裡來了個暴走女外科)**; Oxcart Trails (牛車來去); Taiwan Crime Stories; The Amazing Grace of Σ (我願意); Copycat Killer	**Best Miniseries**: **Wave Makers**; Shards of Her; Hoping (和平歸來); The Leaking Bookstore (茁劇場-滴水的推理書屋)
**Best Television Film**: **The Mimicry (客家電影院-綠金龜的模仿犯)**; Far Away Eyes (幻日手記); On Marriage: Mary's Merry Marriage (你的婚姻不是你的婚姻：梅莉); My Sister (姊姊); Revolting with Dragon (龔囝)

==== Individual awards ====
**Best Directing for a Television Series**: **Lai Meng-jie — Mad Doctor (村裡來了個暴走女外科)**; Chang Jung-chi, Henri Chang — Copycat Killer; Hung Tzu-hsuan — Taiwan Crime Stories - A Matter of Life and Death (台灣犯罪故事-生死困局); Hsu Jui-liang — Taiwan Crime Stories - Dark Currents (台灣犯罪故事-黑潮之下); Li Yao-feng, Chang Chih-hung — Oxcart Trails (牛車來去)	**Best Writing for a Television Series**: **Li Yao-feng, Hsu Huei-Chin, Li Yi-Ching — Oxcart Trails (牛車來去)**; Ma Keming, Ho Shing-Ming, Wu Jiun-You, Wang Jia-An, Yang Wan-ju, Chou Ke-Wei, You Yi-qing — Copycat Killer; Lai Meng-jie, Chang Shi-xian, Wang You-zhen, Wang Hui-Chu — Mad Doctor (村裡來了個暴走女外科); Liang Shu-Ting — Taiwan Crime Stories - Dark Currents (台灣犯罪故事-黑潮之下); Chen Meishan, Wen Huei-Ming — Daybreak (暗夜微光)
**Best Leading Actor in a Television Series**: **Hsueh Shih-ling — Taiwan Crime Stories - Derailment (台灣犯罪故事-出軌)**; Wu Kang-ren — Copycat Killer; Frederick Lee — Taiwan Crime Stories - A Matter of Life and Death (台灣犯罪故事-生死困局); Yao Chun-yao — Copycat Killer (模仿犯); Emerson Tsai — Oxcart Trails (牛車來去)	**Best Leading Actress in a Television Series**: **Janel Tsai — Mad Doctor (村裡來了個暴走女外科)**; Amber An — Oxcart Trails (牛車來去); Allison Lin — Taiwan Crime Stories - Derailment (台灣犯罪故事-出軌); Gwei Lun-mei — Women in Taipei; Francesca Kao — The Amazing Grace of Σ (我願意)
**Best Supporting Actor in a Television Series**: **Sam Yang — The Amazing Grace of Σ (我願意)**; Tuo Tsung-hua — Copycat Killer; Chen Bor-jeng — Copycat Killer; Yu An-shun — Oxcart Trails (牛車來去); Jason Tsou — The Amazing Grace of Σ (我願意)	**Best Supporting Actress in a Television Series**: **Mini Chao — Oxcart Trails (牛車來去)**; Wang Yu-ping — Lesson in Love (第9節課); Wu Yi-jung — The Amazing Grace of Σ (我願意); Ally Chiu — Copycat Killer (模仿犯); Yang Fu-jiang — Daybreak (客家尋味劇場-暗夜微光)
**Best Newcomer in a Television Series**: **Su Ying — Mad Doctor (村裡來了個暴走女外科)**; Chanel Wang — Youngsters on Fire (機智校園生活青春向前衝); Yang Chen — Lesson in Love (第9節課); Dai Ya-zhi — Dear Adam (親愛的亞當)	
**Best Directing for a Miniseries or Television Film**: **Lin Chun-yang — Wave Makers**; Cho Li — Shards of Her; John Hsu — On Marriage: Wishful Syncing (你的婚姻不是你的婚姻-聖筊); Chang Chih-teng — Good Day (詠晴); Chung You-lin — Hakka Cinema: The Mimicry (客家電影院-綠金龜的模仿犯)	**Best Writing for a Miniseries or Television Film**: **Wen Yu-fang — Shards of Her**; Hsia Kang-chen — On Marriage: Mary's Merry Marriage (你的婚姻不是你的婚姻-梅莉); Pan Ke-yin — my sister (姊姊); Chen Hong-Ren — On Marriage: Wishful Syncing (你的婚姻不是你的婚姻-聖筊); Chien Li-ying, Yan Shi-ji — Wave Makers
**Best Leading Actor in a Miniseries or Television Film**: **Toby Lee — Shards of Her**; Kou Fung — Who Says That Momma Is Like the Moon? (茁劇場-誰說媽媽像月亮); Kaiser Chuang — Bonus Trip (額外旅程); Liu Kuan-ting — On Marriage: Wishful Syncing (你的婚姻不是你的婚姻-聖筊); Lan Wei-hua — On Marriage: Marriage No.1314 (你的婚姻不是你的婚姻-尾號1314)	**Best Leading Actress in a Miniseries or Television Film**: **Hsu Wei-ning — Shards of Her**; Gingle Wang — Wave Makers; Kimi Hsia — On Marriage: Mary's Merry Marriage (你的婚姻不是你的婚姻：梅莉); Sun Ke-fang — On Marriage: Wishful Syncing (你的婚姻不是你的婚姻-聖筊); Lu Yi-ching — To the Sea (看海)
**Best Supporting Actor in a Miniseries or Television Film**: **Huang Di-yang — To the Sea (看海)**; Pu Hsueh-liang — Wave Makers; Hu Jhih-ciang — Revolting with Dragon (龔囝); River Huang — The Leaking Bookstore (茁劇場-滴水的推理書屋); Leon Dai — Wave Makers	**Best Supporting Actress in a Miniseries or Television Film**: **Fan Jui-chun — Bonus Trip (額外旅程)**; Ding Ning — Shards of Her; Chen Yu — Space Boy (台語有影 - 阿波羅男孩); Tsai Hsuan-yen — Wave Makers; Lai Pei-hsia — Wave Makers
**Best Newcomer in a Miniseries or Television Film**: **Charlize Lamb — Shards of Her**; Lin Yi-ting — Reclaim My Summer (公視學生劇展-回收場的夏天); Samingad — Who Says That Momma Is Like the Moon? (茁劇場-誰說媽媽像月亮); Huang Pei-qi — My Sister (姊姊); Liu Yan-ru — She Doesn’t Care (那天，我媽偷了老師的車)	

==== Technical Awards ====
**Best Cinematography for a Drama Series** Chen Ke-qin, Lee Ming, Bai Chieh-li and Zhan Chen-zhi — Copycat Killer	**Best Editing for a Drama Series** Lei Cheng-ching — Women in Taipei
**Best Lighting for a Drama Series** Hsu Chun-chuan — Copycat Killer	**Best Sound Design for a Drama Series** Chang Yi-ting, Ou Chien-qi, Chen Yan-ru and Chen Hsu-hao — Reclaim My Summer (公視學生劇展 - 回收場的夏天)
**Best Art and Design for a Drama Series** Hsiao Jen-chieh — Copycat Killer	**Best Costume Design for a Drama Series** Pili Bing Feng Jue: Bloody Battle costume team — Pili Bing Feng Jue: Bloody Battle (霹靂兵烽決之碧血玄黃)
**Best Visual Effects for a Drama Series** Wave Makers visual effects team — Wave Makers	**Best Score for a Drama Series** Chris Hou, Sophie Lu, Kao Min-lun and Huang Wei-che — Taiwan Crime Stories
**Best Theme Song**: **Leo Wang, Chen Hsien-ching, Jerry Li and Lil Happy Lif3 — "A No is a No" (from Wave Makers)**; DJ Didilong and Wang Ming-tai — "My Blue Angel" (from I've Walked Through the Love's Wilderness (茁劇場-走過愛的蠻荒)); Billie Wang and Nick Chou — "Billie" (from Mom, Don't Do That!); Ric Huang, Liu Hao-xu and Chang Fu-gui — "Oxcart Trails" (from Oxcart Trails (牛車來去)); Rene Liu, David Ke, David Ke and Alex Chang Jien — "Epitome" (from Women in Taipei)	

==== Other Award ====
**Creative Award for a Drama Series**: **Copycat Killer**; The Amazing Grace of Σ (我願意)	**Most Popular Drama Series** **(Public-voted)**: **Copycat Killer**
