= Wave Makers =

- Promotional poster
- Traditional Chinese: 人選之人—造浪者
- Simplified Chinese: 人选之人—造浪者
- Hanyu Pinyin: Rén Xuǎn Zhī Rén Zào Làng Zhě
- Hokkien POJ: Jîn-soán ê Lâng: Chō-lōng-chiá
- Genre: Drama; Political drama
- Written by: Chien Li-ying; Yan Shi-ji
- Directed by: Lin Chun-yang
- Starring: Hsieh Ying-xuan; Jag Huang; Gingle Wang; Leon Dai; Buffy Chen
- Ending theme: "得意的一天 A no is a no" by Leo Wang & Chen Hsien-ching
- Country of origin: Taiwan
- Original languages: Mandarin; Taiwanese Hokkien; Taiwanese Hakka; English
- No. of seasons: 1
- No. of episodes: 8

Production
- Production location: Taiwan
- Production companies: DaMou Entertainment; Public Television Service

Original release
- Network: Netflix
- Release: 28 April 2023
- Network: Public Television Service
- Release: 28 October – 18 November 2023

Wave Makers (Chinese: 人選之人—造浪者) is a 2023 Taiwanese political drama television series written by Chien Li-ying and Yan Shi-ji and directed by Lin Chun-yang. The series stars Hsieh Ying-xuan, Jag Huang, Gingle Wang, Leon Dai, and Buffy Chen. The drama follows the lives of the political campaign staff of a fictional Taiwanese political party during the runup to a presidential election. Domestic Taiwanese political issues such as workplace sexual harassment, death penalty, immigration, same-sex marriage, and environmental issues are explored.

Produced by DaMou Entertainment and Public Television Service, Wave Makers premiered worldwide on Netflix on April 28, 2023.

== Plot ==
Wen-fang Weng is the assistant director of the Justice Party public relations campaign of presidential candidate Yueh-chen Lin, who seeks to oust the incumbent president. The daughter of an influential legislator in the same party, Weng lost her re-election for councilor of her district when she defended herself against a homophobic supporter of her father who verbally attacked her when he saw her kissing her wife, and afterwards refused to apologize to him. Chia-ching Chen, whose workaholism on the campaign has jeopardized his marriage, supervises the team of campaign staff working to elect Yueh-chen.

The current president seeking re-election, Ling-hsien Sun, announces that her running mate will be Chang-tse Chao, but rumors begin to surface of Chao's trysts with a current staffer. One of his previous trysts was with his former student and assistant, Ya-ching Chang, who now works for the Justice Party on Yueh-chen's campaign. Chang tries to keep her past affair with Chao a secret, while also trying to convince him to return the nude photos her took of her when they were together. Chang becomes embroiled in a workplace sexual harassment case at the Justice Party, and with the support of Weng and Chen tries to navigate the unfolding case as male supervisors want to keep the incident under wraps.

== Cast ==
=== Main ===
- Hsieh Ying-xuan as Wen-fang Weng
- Jag Huang as Chia-ching Chen
- Gingle Wang as Ya-ching Chang
- Leon Dai as Chang-tse Chao
- Buffy Chen as Jung-chih Chao

=== Supporting ===
- Tammy Darshana Lai as Yueh-chen Lin
- Aviis Zhong as Chu Li-ya
- Yi-Ling Liao as Yang Ya-ting
- Zhan Huai-yun as Hsu Hsiang-kai

== Reception ==
=== Critical response ===
James Marsh of the South China Morning Post observed that Wave Makers's cast and story is predominantly female, including both presidential candidates. Regarding the political issues touched on the story, Marsh writes that "despite the show's tendency to oversimplify hot-button political issues and then amplify them to a ridiculous degree in the name of drama, Wave Makers succeeds in creating an engaging landscape populated by characters that we genuinely care about."

Chieh-Ting Yeh of the University of Nottingham Taiwan Studies Institute notes the absence of relations with Mainland China as an issue during the political campaign depicted in the show, despite being one of the most important topics in Taiwanese politics today. "In 'Wave Makers', policy towards a foreign country is not an existential issue and does not overshadow all the other important issues from the public square. Rival politicians can debate immigration and environmental policies, fend off student protesters, and even dig up each other's scandals without worrying about what anyone in Beijing or Washington says. Having an election where no matter who wins, a woman with gravitas will become president is not bad," Yeh writes.

Sarah Musnicky from But Why Tho? wrote that while Wave Makers touches on several important political issues, it doesn't spend enough time to dive deeply into them: "Ironically, this reflects political debate topics in a way, with how we never truly get to the crux of the issues. We touch upon them and then move onto the next topic voters are interested in." Instead, Musnicky writes, "The real heart and soul of the series is in its characters."

=== Accolades ===
Wave Makers received 14 Golden Bell Award nominations, won 4 of the awards including Best Miniseries.

Year	Award	Category	Nominee(s)	Result	Ref.
2023	Asia Contents Awards & Global OTT Awards	Best OTT Original	Wave Makers	Nominated	
2023	Asia Contents Awards & Global OTT Awards	Best Supporting Actress	Buffy Chen	Nominated	
2023	Asia Contents Awards & Global OTT Awards	Rising Star of the Year	Buffy Chen	Won	
2023	58th Golden Bell Awards	Best Miniseries	Wave Makers	Won	
2023	58th Golden Bell Awards	Best Directing for a Miniseries or Television Film	Lin Chun-yang	Won	
2023	58th Golden Bell Awards	Best Visual Effects for a Drama Series	Tu Weiting, Yuan Changshou, Jiang Weihong, Fan Jieyu, Ye Yiling	Won	
2023	58th Golden Bell Awards	Best Theme Song	"A No is a No" – Leo Wang, Chen Hsien-ching, Li Quanzhe, Tang Jie	Won	
2023	58th Golden Bell Awards	Best Leading Actress in a Miniseries or Television Film	Gingle Wang	Nominated	
2023	58th Golden Bell Awards	Best Supporting Actor in a Miniseries or Television Film	Pu Hsueh-liang	Nominated	
2023	58th Golden Bell Awards	Best Supporting Actor in a Miniseries or Television Film	Leon Dai	Nominated	
2023	58th Golden Bell Awards	Best Supporting Actress in a Miniseries or Television Film	Tsai Hsuan-yen	Nominated	
2023	58th Golden Bell Awards	Best Supporting Actress in a Miniseries or Television Film	Lai Pei-hsia	Nominated	
2023	58th Golden Bell Awards	Best Editing for a Drama Series	Shi Bohan	Nominated	
2023	58th Golden Bell Awards	Best Cinematography for a Drama Series	Jian Youtao and Wang Liangjun	Nominated	
2023	58th Golden Bell Awards	Best Writing for a Miniseries or Television Film	Chien Li-ying and Yan Shi-ji	Nominated	
2023	58th Golden Bell Awards	Best Art and Design for a Drama Series	Fang Xuzhong and Luo Wenjing	Nominated	
2023	58th Golden Bell Awards	Best Score for a Drama Series	Hou Zhijian	Nominated	

== Impact ==
Wave Makers brought increased attention to sexual harassment in Taiwanese society and set off a round of grappling with the issue. Allegations have been made against figures in the political, economic, and artistic spheres. Taiwan has long had a culture of silence and shame surrounding sexual assault. Exiled Chinese human rights activist Teng Biao apologized after allegations against him were made public.

After the series was aired, a former party staffer for Taiwan's Democratic Progressive Party (DPP) posted on social media about how she experienced sexual harassments at the workplace but her supervisor tried to dissuade her from pursuing the case. The party staffer referenced Wave Makers in her social media post. Taiwanese President Tsai Ing-wen apologized twice for the allegations made against members of her party, the DPP, and promised that changes would be made both in party policy and culture.

Although Wave Makers is censored on the Chinese review aggregator Douban, the show was the focus of online discussion in mainland China regarding Taiwanese politics and its differences from China.
