= Golden Bell Award for Best Reality or Game Show =

Taiwanese television award

- Awarded for: Best Reality or Game Show
- Location: Taiwan
- Presented by: Bureau of Audiovisual and Music Industry Development
- First award: 2017
- Currently held by: Let's Open (2023)
- Website: gba.tavis.tw

The Golden Bell Award for Best Reality or Game Show (Chinese: 電視金鐘獎益智及實境節目獎) is one of the categories of the competition for Taiwanese television production, Golden Bell Awards. It has been awarded since 2017.

== Winners ==
=== 2020s ===
Year	English title	Original title	Ref
2020; 55th Golden Bell Awards	National Star Raiders	全民星攻略	
2021; 56th Golden Bell Awards	All Star Sports Day	全明星運動會	
2022; 57th Golden Bell Awards	Aqua Challenge	決戰水下伸展台	
2023; 58th Golden Bell Awards	Let's Open	來吧！營業中	
