= Golden Bell Creative Award =

Taiwanese television award

Creative Award
- Awarded for: Best in Creativity
- Location: Taiwan
- Presented by: Bureau of Audiovisual and Music Industry Development
- First award: 2016
- Currently held by: A Song For You & Copycat Killer (2023)
- Website: gba.tavis.tw

The Creative Award (Chinese: 電視金鐘獎戲劇節目創新獎; or Innovative Award) is one of the categories of the competition for Taiwanese television production, Golden Bell Awards. It has been awarded since 2016.

== Winners ==
=== 2020s ===
Year	English title	Original title	Ref
2020; 55th Golden Bell Awards	See You at the Market	我在市場待了一整天	
2020; 55th Golden Bell Awards	Someday or One Day	想見你	
2021; 56th Golden Bell Awards	All Star Sports Day	全明星運動會	
2022; 57th Golden Bell Awards	PTS Theme Night Show	公視主題之夜Show	
2022; 57th Golden Bell Awards	Your Island My Home	你的島嶼我的家	
2022; 57th Golden Bell Awards	Tavern by the Lethe	孟婆客棧	
2023; 58th Golden Bell Awards	A Song For You	為你唱情歌	
2023; 58th Golden Bell Awards	Copycat Killer	模仿犯	
