= Golden Bell Award for Best Lifestyle Show =

Taiwanese television award

- Awarded for: Best Lifestyle Show
- Location: Taiwan
- Presented by: Bureau of Audiovisual and Music Industry Development
- First award: 2017
- Currently held by: Viva La Vita (2023)
- Website: gba.tavis.tw

The Golden Bell Award for Best Lifestyle Show (Chinese: 電視金鐘獎生活風格節目獎) is one of the categories of the competition for Taiwanese television production, Golden Bell Awards. It has been awarded since 2017.

== Winners ==
=== 2020s ===
Year	English title	Original title	Ref
2020; 55th Golden Bell Awards	See You at the Market	我在市場待了一整天	
2021; 56th Golden Bell Awards	GuessWho 12	誰來晚餐12	
2022; 57th Golden Bell Awards	Blessing of Formosa	寶島神很大	
2023; 58th Golden Bell Awards	Viva La Vita	我在工場拍拍手	
