= Golden Bell Award for Best Host in a Lifestyle Show =

Taiwanese television award

- Awarded for: Best Host in a Lifestyle Show
- Location: Taiwan
- Presented by: Bureau of Audiovisual and Music Industry Development
- First award: 2017
- Currently held by: Wang Hao-yi and Liu Ka-shiang for Slow Travel Adventures (2023)
- Website: gba.tavis.tw

The Golden Bell Award for Best Host in a Lifestyle Show (Chinese: 電視金鐘獎生活風格節目主持人獎) is one of the categories of the competition for the Taiwanese television production, Golden Bell Awards. It has been awarded since 2017.

== Award winners ==
=== 2020s ===
Year	Winner	English title	Original title	Ref
2020; 55th Golden Bell Awards	Isabel Kao	Discover Love	家庭八點檔轉轉發現愛	
2021; 56th Golden Bell Awards	Patty Lee	Jiangplay	原來是匠紫	
2022; 57th Golden Bell Awards	Kodabow	Blessing of Formosa	寶島神很大	
2023; 58th Golden Bell Awards	Wang Hao-yi and Liu Ka-shiang	Slow Travel Adventures	浩克慢遊	
