= Golden Bell Award for Best Art and Design for a Drama Series =

Award for art and design for a drama series

- Awarded for: Best Art and Design for a Drama Series
- Location: Taiwan
- Presented by: Bureau of Audiovisual and Music Industry Development
- First award: 1980
- Currently held by: Copycat Killer (2023)
- Website: gba.tavis.tw

The Golden Bell Award for Best Art and Design for a Drama Series (Chinese: 電視金鐘獎戲劇類節目美術設計獎) is one of the categories of the competition for Taiwanese television production, Golden Bell Awards. It has been awarded since 1980.

== Winners ==
=== 2020s ===
Year	English title	Original title	Ref
2020; 55th Golden Bell Awards	Nowhere Man	罪夢者	
2021; 56th Golden Bell Awards	The Magician on the Skywalk	天橋上的魔術師	
2022; 57th Golden Bell Awards	Twisted Strings	良辰吉時	
2023; 58th Golden Bell Awards	Copycat Killer	模仿犯	
