= Golden Bell Award for Best Directing for a Miniseries or Television Film =

Award for directing for a miniseries or television film

- Awarded for: Best Directing for a Miniseries or Television Film
- Location: Taiwan
- Presented by: Bureau of Audiovisual and Music Industry Development
- First award: 2001
- Currently held by: Lin Chun-yang for Wave Makers (2023)
- Website: gba.tavis.tw

The Golden Bell Award for Best Directing for a Miniseries or Television Film (Chinese: 電視金鐘獎迷你劇集（電視電影）導演獎) is one of the categories of the competition for Taiwanese television production, Golden Bell Awards. It has been awarded since 2001.

== Winners ==
=== 2020s ===
Year	Winner	English title	Original title	Ref
2020; 55th Golden Bell Awards	Lin Chih-ju	Hakka TV Cinema - Da Orange Dali Family Peace	客家電視電影院—《大桔大利 闔家平安》	
2021; 56th Golden Bell Awards	Cheng Fen-fen	Workers	做工的人	
2022; 57th Golden Bell Awards	Hsieh Pei-ru	More Than Blue: The Series	比悲傷更悲傷的故事 影集版	
2023; 58th Golden Bell Awards	Lin Chun-yang	Wave Makers	人選之人 - 造浪者	
