= Golden Bell Award for Best Writing for a Television Series =

Award for best writing for a television series

- Awarded for: Best Writing for a Television Series
- Location: Taiwan
- Presented by: Bureau of Audiovisual and Music Industry Development
- First award: 1980
- Currently held by: Oxcart Trails (2023)
- Website: gba.tavis.tw

The Golden Bell Award for Best Writing for a Television Series (Chinese: 電視金鐘獎戲劇節目編劇獎) is one of the categories of the competition for Taiwanese television production, Golden Bell Awards. It has been awarded since 1980.

== Winners ==
=== 2020s ===
Year	Winner	English title	Original title	Ref
2020; 55th Golden Bell Awards	Chien Chi-feng and Lin Hsin-hui	Someday or One Day	想見你	
2021; 56th Golden Bell Awards	Nikki Chang, Wu Dai-yun, Ray Wu and Mark Chen	Girls Win	客家尋味劇場─《女孩上場》	
2022; 57th Golden Bell Awards	Yen Yi-wen, Kitten Huang and Fan Chih-chi	The Making of an Ordinary Woman 2	俗女養成記2	
2023; 58th Golden Bell Awards	Li Yao-feng, Hsu Huei-chin and Li Yi-ching	Oxcart Trails	牛車來去	
