= Golden Bell Award for Best Writing for a Miniseries or Television Film =

Award for writing for a miniseries or television film

- Awarded for: Best Writing for a Miniseries or Television Film
- Location: Taiwan
- Presented by: Bureau of Audiovisual and Music Industry Development
- First award: 2001
- Currently held by: Wen Yu-fang for Shards of Her (2023)
- Website: gba.tavis.tw

The Golden Bell Award for Best Writing for a Miniseries or Television Film (Chinese: 電視金鐘獎迷你劇集（電視電影）編劇獎) is one of the categories of the competition for Taiwanese television production, Golden Bell Awards. It has been awarded since 2001.

== Winners ==
=== 2020s ===
Year	Winner	English title	Original title	Ref
2020; 55th Golden Bell Awards	Chin Chia-hua	Newly Created Short Film - Daji	新創電影短片 - 大吉	
2021; 56th Golden Bell Awards	Hsu Li-wen	Hakka Cinema - The Child of Light	客家電影院－光的孩子	
2022; 57th Golden Bell Awards	Deng Yi-han	Fragrance of the First Flower	第一次遇見花香的那刻	
2023; 58th Golden Bell Awards	Wen Yu-fang	Shards of Her	她和她的她	
