= Golden Bell Award for Best Directing for a Television Series =

Television award for Best Directing for a Television Series

- Awarded for: Best Directing for a Television Series
- Location: Taiwan
- Presented by: Bureau of Audiovisual and Music Industry Development
- First award: 1980
- Currently held by: Lai Meng-jie for Mad Doctor (2023)
- Website: gba.tavis.tw

The Golden Bell Award for Best Directing for a Television Series (Chinese: 電視金鐘獎戲劇節目導演獎) is one of the categories of the competition for the Taiwanese television production, Golden Bell Awards. It has been awarded since 1980.

== Winners ==
=== 2000s ===
Year	Winner(s)	English title	Original title	Ref
2006; 41st Golden Bell Awards	Fung Kai	Green Forest, My Home	綠光森林	
2007; 42nd Golden Bell Awards	Tsai Yueh-hsun	The Hospital	白色巨塔	
2008; 43rd Golden Bell Awards	Chen Wei-ling	Golden Line	大愛劇場 - 黃金線	
2009; 44th Golden Bell Awards	Tsai Yueh-hsun	Black & White	痞子英雄	

=== 2010s ===
Year	Winner(s)	English title	Original title	Ref
2010; 45th Golden Bell Awards	Chen Wei-ling	Year of the Rain	那年，雨不停國	
2011; 46th Golden Bell Awards	Yu Hong-chi	Scent of Love	就是要香戀	
2012; 47th Golden Bell Awards	Chu Yu-ning	In Time with You	我可能不會愛你	
2013; 48th Golden Bell Awards	Wang Ming-tai	Falling	含苞欲墜的每一天	

=== 2020s ===
Year	Winner(s)	English title	Original title	Ref
2020; 55th Golden Bell Awards	Kao Pin-chuan and Tseng Ying-ting	Yong-Jiu Grocery Store	用九柑仔店	
2021; 56th Golden Bell Awards	Yang Ya-che	The Magician on the Skywalk	天橋上的魔術師	
2022; 57th Golden Bell Awards	David Chuang and Allen Chen	Danger Zone	逆局	
2023; 58th Golden Bell Awards	Lai Meng-jie	Mad Doctor	村裡來了個暴走女外科	
