= Chung Hsin-ling =

Taiwanese actress (born 1972)

- 鍾欣凌
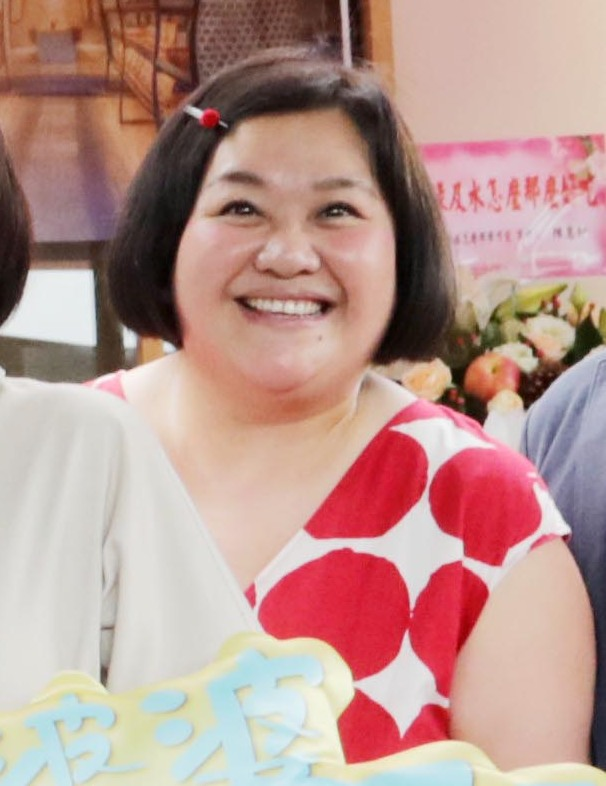
- Chung in June 2020
- Born: Chung Hsin-ling; 12 August 1972 (age 53); Taiwan
- Education: National Institute of Arts (BA)
- Occupations: Actress; television host
- Years active: 1999–present
- Spouse: Chen Ching-ho (m. 2010)
- Children: 2

Chung Hsin-ling (Chinese: 鍾欣凌; born 12 August 1972) is a Taiwanese actress and television host. Beginning her career as a stage actress and television host for children's programs, Chung gained public recognition through her onscreen roles in the romance series Fated to Love You and Invincible Shan Bao Mei (both 2008). She received a total of 14 Golden Bell Award nominations, winning Best Leading Actress in a Television Series twice for Sun After The Rain (2014) and U Motherbaker (2020–2024), as well as Best Leading Actress in a Miniseries for On Children (2018).

== Early life and education ==
Chung was born on 12 August 1972. Her father is a bank manager and her mother is a housewife, and she grew up with two older brothers. She became obese in second grade and remained the heaviest in high school. During a school Christmas talent show, she was selected to perform in A Christmas Carol, where a teacher recognized her acting potential and encouraged her to study acting. Following this advice, she applied to the National Institute of Arts (now Taipei National University of Arts) and graduated with a Bachelor of Arts in drama, specializing in stage performance. However, she did not pursue acting after graduation due to concerns about her appearance and a reluctance to be typecast as a supporting actress, so she chose to work as an executive producer for five years.

== Career ==
Chung began her acting career in 1999 at the age of 27, after discovering her passion on a trip to Canada, starting on stage with minor non-speaking roles. She subsequently joined the Pingfong Acting Troupe at the invitation of Hugh Lee and began hosting children's programs, including Dr. Cool with Timothy Chao in 2001, which earned her the award for Best Host in a Children and Youth Show in the 36th Golden Bell Awards. She was nominated for the same award twice more in the 37th and 38th Golden Bell Awards for hosting Magazine Teenager and The Hokkien Quacks.

Chung landed her first main onscreen role as Mei Mei in the 2003 romance series Love Wasabi, earning a nomination for Best Leading Actress in a Miniseries or Television Film in the 38th Golden Bell Awards. She appeared in minor roles in the 2005 television series The Prince Who Turns into a Frog and Wayward Kenting, and began to gain public recognition for her supporting roles in the 2008 romance series Fated to Love You and Invincible Shan Bao Mei. From 2010 to 2011, she starred in supporting roles in the television series Strands of Love, Ring Ring Bell, and Love You.

Chung landed her breakout role as Chen Yu-hsia in the 2014 period drama Sun After The Rain, for which she won Best Leading Actress in a Television Series in the 49th Golden Bell Awards. She then took on a main role in the 2015 romance series Leo and appeared in the films Gatao and Our Times the same year. In 2017, she received another main role in the drama series She's Family and portrayed Kuo Yen's mother in the 2018 anthology drama series On Children, earning her Best Leading Actress in a Miniseries or Television Film in the 54th Golden Bell Awards. Originally cast in a lead role in the 2018 drama film Dear Ex, she passed the role to fellow actress Yang Li-yin, who was facing financial difficulties at the time, and instead made a voice cameo. She also hosted the children's variety program Mobilize and was nominated for Best Host in a Children and Youth Show twice in the 55th and 56th Golden Bell Awards.

Starting in 2020, Chung secured a main role as Su Lin Cai-hsiang in the drama series U Motherbaker, for which she won Best Leading Actress in a Television Series again in the 56th Golden Bell Awards. She later reprised her role in the spin-off film U Motherbaker - The Movie in 2023 and the sequel series in 2024. She also starred in the 2021 romance film Man in Love, for which she received nominations for Best Supporting Actress in the 23rd Taipei Film Awards and Best Supporting Actress in the 58th Golden Horse Awards. Chung is set to appear in a main role in the 2024 Netflix drama series Born for the Spotlight.

== Personal life ==
Chung is married to Peking opera actor Chen Ching-ho on 21 December 2010. They have two daughters.

== Filmography ==
=== Film ===
Year	Title	Role	Notes/Ref.
2014	Twa-Tiu-Tiann	Qing-shui (清水嬸)	
2015	Gatao	Hsiu-lien (秀蓮)	
2015	Our Times	Lin's mother	
2018	Dear Ex	Radio host	Voice cameo
2021	I Missed You	Chinchin's superior	
2021	Man in Love	Cai Yu'e (蔡玉娥)	
2023	Miss Shampoo	Fen's mother	
2023	U Motherbaker - The Movie	Su Lin Cai-hsiang	
2023	After School	Wang's wife	
2024	Pigsy	Grandma	Voice role

=== Television ===
Year	Title	Role	Notes/Ref.
2003	Love Wasabi	Mei Mei (美美)	Main role
2005	The Prince Who Turns into a Frog	Ada	Guest role
2005	Wayward Kenting	Liang's colleague	Guest role
2008	Fated to Love You	Chen Feng-jiao (陳鳳嬌)	Recurring role
2008	Invincible Shan Bao Mei	Chi Xin-jie (癡心姐)	Recurring role
2009	My Queen	Da Du-yi (大肚怡)	Guest role
2010	Strands of Love	Yi Jian-mei (伊簡梅)	Recurring role
2010	PS Man	Mary Wong (黃瑪麗)	Recurring role
2011	Ring Ring Bell	Chang Ya-wen (張雅文)	Recurring role
2011	Love You	Cai Meng-jun (蔡孟均)	Recurring role
2012	An Innocent Mistake	Hostess	Guest role
2012	Ti Amo Chocolate	Su Hsiao-hsiao (蘇小小)	Recurring role
2013	Golden Dad	Hsiao-mei (小梅)	Recurring role
2014	Sun After The Rain	Chen Yu-Hsia (陳玉霞)	Main role
2015	Leo	Lin Mei-yu (林美如)	Main role
2015	Marry Me, or Not?	Xiao Dai (小黛)	Cameo
2016	Fighting Meiling	Fung Jiao (鳳嬌)	Recurring role
2017	She's Family	Black Cat (黑貓姐)	Main role
2018	Single Ladies Senior	Mina's mother	Recurring role
2018	On Children	Kuo-Yen's mother	Main role (segment: "Child of the Cat")
2018	Intern Doctor	Yang Bi-ting (楊碧婷)	Main role (season 7)
2020–2024	U Motherbaker	Su Lin Cai-hsiang (蘇林彩香)	Main role (season 1–2)
2021	The Making of an Ordinary Woman 2	Policewoman	Cameo
2021	Rainless Love in a Godless Land	Raka	Recurring role
2022	Mom, Don't Do That!	Li Pang-fa's daughter-in-law	Cameo
2023	Oh No! Here Comes Trouble	He Shou-tang (何守堂)	Special appearance
2023	Best Interest	Fung Si-wen (馮思雯)	Recurring role
2024	GG Precinct	Deputy Director-general	Special appearance
2024	Born for the Spotlight	Miss Chubby (胖姐)	Main role
2025	The Resurrected	Yue-hsin (悅心)	Main role

== Awards and nominations ==
Year	Award	Category	Work	Result	Ref.
2001	36th Golden Bell Awards	Best Host in a Children and Youth Show	Dr. Cool	Won	
2002	37th Golden Bell Awards	Best Host in a Children and Youth Show	Magazine Teenager	Nominated	
2003	38th Golden Bell Awards	Best Host in a Children and Youth Show	Magazine Teenager	Nominated	
2003	38th Golden Bell Awards	Best Host in a Children and Youth Show	The Hokkien Quacks	Nominated	
2003	38th Golden Bell Awards	Best Leading Actress in a Miniseries or Television Film	Love Wasabi	Nominated	
2004	39th Golden Bell Awards	Best Host in a Children and Youth Show	Magazine Teenager	Nominated	
2014	49th Golden Bell Awards	Best Leading Actress in a Television Series	Sun After The Rain	Won	
2019	54th Golden Bell Awards	Best Leading Actress in a Miniseries or Television Film	On Children	Won	
2020	55th Golden Bell Awards	Best Host in a Children and Youth Show	Mobilize	Nominated	
2021	56th Golden Bell Awards	Best Host in a Children and Youth Show	Mobilize	Nominated	
2021	56th Golden Bell Awards	Best Leading Actress in a Television Series	U Motherbaker	Won	
2021	23rd Taipei Film Awards	Best Supporting Actress	Man in Love	Nominated	
2021	58th Golden Horse Awards	Best Supporting Actress	Man in Love	Nominated	
2022	57th Golden Bell Awards	Best Host in a Children and Youth Show	Mobilize	Nominated	
2023	58th Golden Bell Awards	Best Host in a Children and Youth Show	Mobilize	Nominated	
2023	58th Golden Bell Awards	Best Host in a Reality or Game Show	Hey girls, Adventure!	Nominated	
