= Golden Bell Award for Best Lighting for a Drama Series =

Award for lighting for a drama series

- Awarded for: Best Lighting for a Drama Series
- Location: Taiwan
- Presented by: Bureau of Audiovisual and Music Industry Development
- First award: 1980
- Currently held by: Seqalu: Formosa 1867 (2022)
- Website: gba.tavis.tw

The Golden Bell Award for Best Lighting for a Drama Series (Chinese: 電視金鐘獎戲劇類節目燈光獎) is one of the categories of the competition for Taiwanese television production, Golden Bell Awards. It has been awarded since 1980.

== Winners ==
=== 2020s ===
Year	English title	Original title	Ref
2020; 55th Golden Bell Awards	Nowhere Man	罪夢者	
2021; 56th Golden Bell Awards	The Magician on the Skywalk	天橋上的魔術師	
2022; 57th Golden Bell Awards	Seqalu: Formosa 1867	斯卡羅	
