= Golden Bell Award for Best Cinematography for a Drama Series =

Award for cinematography for a drama series

- Awarded for: Best Cinematography for a Drama Series
- Location: Taiwan
- Presented by: Bureau of Audiovisual and Music Industry Development
- First award: 1980
- Currently held by: Chen Ke-qin, Lee Ming, Bai Chieh-li and Zhan Chen-zhi for Copycat Killer (2023)
- Website: gba.tavis.tw

The Golden Bell Award for Best Cinematography for a Drama Series (Chinese: 電視金鐘獎戲劇類節目攝影獎) is one of the categories of the competition for Taiwanese television production, Golden Bell Awards. It has been awarded since 1980.

== Winners ==
=== 2020s ===
| Year | English title | Original title | Ref |
|---|---|---|---|
| 2020; 55th Golden Bell Awards | Nowhere Man | 罪夢者 | |
| 2021; 56th Golden Bell Awards | The Magician on the Skywalk | 天橋上的魔術師 | |
| 2022; 57th Golden Bell Awards | The Making of an Ordinary Woman 2 | 俗女養成記2 | |
| 2023; 58th Golden Bell Awards | Copycat Killer | 模仿犯 | |
