= Shards of Her =

Taiwanese television series

Chinese name
- Traditional Chinese: 她和她的她
- Simplified Chinese: 她和她的她
Transcriptions
Standard Mandarin
- Hanyu Pinyin: Tā hé tā de tā
- Genre: Drama; Mystery; Suspense; Thriller
- Written by: Wen Yu-Fang
- Directed by: Cho Li
- Starring: Hsu Wei-ning; Toby Lee; Alyssa Chia; Puff Kuo; Wu Kang-ren; Wen Chen-ling; Jake Hsu
- Country of origin: Taiwan
- Original language: Mandarin
- No. of seasons: 1
- No. of episodes: 9

Production
- Executive producer: Yeh Ju-fen
- Producer: Wang Ke-jie
- Running time: 45-51 minutes
- Production company: Gala Television

Original release
- Network: Netflix
- Release: 28 October 2022

Shards of Her (Chinese: 她和她的她) is a 2022 Taiwanese Netflix original series written by Wen Yu-Fang and directed by Cho Li. The series stars Hsu Wei-ning, Toby Lee, Alyssa Chia, Wu Kang-ren, Puff Kuo, Wen Chen-ling, Jake Hsu, Lee Pei-Yu and Wang Yi-cheng.

== Synopsis ==
Waking up from a coma, an accomplished headhunter finds herself in an alternate reality where she has to revisit an excruciating childhood trauma.

== Cast ==
=== Main starring ===
- Hsu Wei-ning as Lin Chen-hsi
- Charlize Lamb as young Lin Chen-hsi
- Toby Lee as Li Hao Ming / Liu Chang Yu
- Wen Chen-ling as Yang Jia Ying
- Lee Pei-Yu as Chen Zhi Ling

=== Support roles ===
- Sara Yu as Xu Hui Zhen (Ep.3-9)
- Ding Ning as Qiu Wan Fen
- Vins Wang as Lin You Cheng (Ep.2-9)
- Jake Hsu as Lin Zhen Ye (Ep.2-9)

=== Guest roles ===
- Alyssa Chia as Yan Sheng Hua, Lin Ch'en-hsi's middle school senior (Ep.1,4-5,7-9)
- Wu Kang-ren as Du Jun Ru (Ep.1-2,8-9)
- Chen Yi-wen as Hsieh Chih-chung, Lin Ch'en-hsi's middle school teacher
- George Hu as Jiang Yuan (Ep. 3–5, 8–9)
- Puff Kuo as Ke Ke (Ep.4,6)
- JC Lin as Ke Di Yang (Ep.3-4,8-9)
- Simon Hsueh as Guan Xiang Li (Ep.6)
- Jacko Chiang as Headhunter boss (Ep.1)
- Tammy Lin as Chen Zhi Ling [Young] (Ep.1-2)
- Jane Liao as Fang Mei Yin (Ep.1,3-4)
- Duan Chun-hao as Chen Ming Qian (Ep.1)
- Liang Ru Xuan as Luo Xiao Nan (Ep.3-4)
- Gail Lin as Teacher Huang
- Ronan Lo as Police (Ep.4-5)
- Ina Tsai Pregnant female supervisor (Ep.4)

== Awards and nominations ==
Year	Award	Category	Recipient(s)	Result
2023	58th Golden Bell Awards	Best Miniseries	Shards of Her	Nominated
2023	58th Golden Bell Awards	Best Directing for a Miniseries or TV Film	Cho Li	Nominated
2023	58th Golden Bell Awards	Best Writing for a Miniseries or TV Film	Wen Yu-fang	Won
2023	58th Golden Bell Awards	Best Actor in a Miniseries or TV Film	Toby Lee	Won
2023	58th Golden Bell Awards	Best Actress in a Miniseries or TV Film	Hsu Wei-ning	Won
2023	58th Golden Bell Awards	Best Supporting Actress in a Miniseries or TV Film	Ding Ning	Nominated
2023	58th Golden Bell Awards	Best Newcomer in a Miniseries or TV Film	Charlize Lamb	Won
