= Golden Bell Award for Most Popular Variety Show =

Taiwanese television award

- Awarded for: Most Popular Variety Show
- Location: Taiwan
- Presented by: Bureau of Audiovisual and Music Industry Development
- First award: 2022
- Currently held by: Hunger Games (2023)
- Website: gba.tavis.tw

The Golden Bell Award for Most Popular Variety Show (Chinese: 電視金鐘獎最具人氣綜藝節目獎) is a popular vote award presented at the annual Golden Bell Awards. It was introduced in 2022.

== Winners ==
=== 2020s ===
Year	English title	Original title	Ref
2022; 57th Golden Bell Awards	Mr. Player	綜藝玩很大	
2023; 58th Golden Bell Awards	Hunger Games	飢餓遊戲	
