= 57th Golden Bell Awards =

Award ceremony

- Promotional banner for the 57th Golden Bell Awards
- Date: Television show categories - October 21, 2022; 17:00 NST (red carpet); 19:00 NST (awards ceremony) Drama series categories - October 22, 2022; 17:00 NST (red carpet); 19:00 NST (awards ceremony)
- Site: Sun Yat-sen Memorial Hall, Taipei, Taiwan
- Hosted by: Television show categories - Sam Tseng and Jesse Tang Drama series categories - Bowie Tsang
- Preshow hosts: Television show categories - Hsueh Chi-kang and Chiao Hsiao-fan Drama series categories - Yang Shiau-li and Chen Chia-kuei
- Organized by: Bureau of Audiovisual and Music Industry Development

Highlights
- Most awards: Seqalu: Formosa 1867 and Twisted Strings (4 wins each)
- Most nominations: Gold Leaf (16 overall nominations)

Television coverage
- Network: Sanlih E-Television (host network; cable & digital); Public Television Service (terrestrial)
- Duration
- Ratings

The 57th Golden Bell Awards (Chinese: 第57屆金鐘獎; pinyin: Dì 57 jiè jīn zhōng jiǎng) were held on October 21, 2022 and October 22, 2022 at the Sun Yat-sen Memorial Hall in Taipei, Taiwan. The ceremonies were televised by Sanlih E-Television (cable & digital) and Public Television Service (terrestrial).

For the first time in the awards history, the winners for television awards were announced on two separate ceremonies – television show categories on October 21 and drama series categories on October 22, with the introduction of audience voting where viewers can vote for the Most Popular Drama Series and the Most Popular Variety Show.

== Winners and nominees ==
Below is the list of winners and nominees for the television award categories. Winners are listed first and highlighted in boldface.

=== Special Contribution Award ===
**Special Contribution Award**
**recipient(s)**
- **Chen Chun-tien (陳君天)**
- **Money Zhang (張宗榮)**

=== Television Show ===
==== Program Awards ====
**Best Variety Show**: **The Rappers (大嘻哈時代)**; #T-POP (#T-POP我們聽大的!!); #To-lam-sian-sinn (HiHi 導覽先生); Wedding Singer (婚禮歌手); Dee's Talk (熙娣想聊)	**Best Reality or Game Show**: **Aqua Challenge (決戰水下伸展台)**; Have a Nice Dream (上山下海過一夜); National Star Raiders (全民星攻略); All Star Sports Day (全明星運動會); Three Piglets 3 (阮三个3)
**Best Lifestyle Show** Blessing of Formosa (寶島神很大)	**Best Natural Science Documentary Show** AI.Next (下一步，AI。NEXT，愛)
**Best Humanities Documentary Show** The Origins of the Austronesians (南島起源)	**Best Children Show** Follow Me Go! (下課花路米－壯遊闖天下)
**Best Youth Show** Kakudan Time Machine (Kakudan時光機)	**Best Animated Show**: **Brave Animated Series (勇者動畫系列)**; Omi Sky (歐米天空)

==== Individual awards ====
**Best Host in a Variety Show**: **Mickey Huang and Lulu Huang Lu Zi Yin — Wedding Singer (婚禮歌手)**; Dee Hsu — Dee's Talk (熙娣想聊); Jacky Wu, Chen Han-dian and Lulu Huang Lu Zi Yin — Hot Door Night (綜藝大熱門); Hu Gua, Aaron Chan, Lai Hui-ru, Lan Jing-wen and York Kuo — Variety Get Together (綜藝大集合); Sam Tseng, Genie Chuo, James Cheng, Wu Ping-cheng — Stylish Man - The Chef (型男大主廚)	**Best Host in a Reality or Game Show**: **Yang Kuei-mei, Shih Ming-shuai, Wen Chen-ling and Austin Lin — Three Piglets 3 (阮三个3)**; Janet Hsieh — Aqua Challenge (決戰水下伸展台); Jacky Wu and Kid — Mr. Player (綜藝玩很大); Hsu Chan-yuan, Gladys Tsai, Rosa Chien and Chiang Hung-chieh — All Star Sports Day (全明星運動會); Sam Tseng and Gladys Tsai — National Star Raiders (全民星攻略)
**Best Host in a Lifestyle Show** Kodabow — Blessing of Formosa (寶島神很大)	**Best Host in a Natural Science and Humanities Documentary Show** Julian Davison and Yosifu — The Origins of the Austronesians (南島起源)
**Best Host in a Children and Youth Show** Hsueh Chi-kang, Ariane Wang and Megan Liao — Follow Me Go! (下課花路米－壯遊闖天下)

==== Technical Awards ====
**Best Directing for a Television Show** Yang Meng-chia — Next Stop (公視紀實 ─ 下一站)	**Best Television Director** Chen Mei-er — #T-POP
**Best Cinematography for a Television Show** Chen Yi-sung、Chen Yu-hsiang、Lin Qing-hua — Call of the Ocean (大洋的召喚)	**Best Editing for a Television Show** Kuo Zong-wei — The Origins of the Austronesians (南島起源)
**Best Sound Design for a Television Show** Joseph Ye, Chen Hsin-hua and Wang Yi-xun — Road to Legacy - Nighteentael (登台之路 - 十九兩)	**Best Lighting for a Television Show** Chang Chia-ming, Wang Wen-feng and Lee Chi-wei — The Rappers (大嘻哈時代)
**Best Art and Design for a Television Show** Lv Yu-wei, Lee Shin-sing and Huang Meng-ying — The Rappers (大嘻哈時代)

=== Other Award ===
**Creative Award for a Television Show**
- **PTS Theme Night Show (公視主題之夜SHOW)**
- **Your Island My Home (你的島嶼我的家)**

=== Drama Series ===
==== Program Awards ====
**Best Television Series**: **Seqalu: Formosa 1867 (斯卡羅)**; The Making of an Ordinary Woman 2 (俗女養成記2); Gold Leaf; Danger Zone (逆局); Light the Night	**Best Miniseries**: **Twisted Strings (良辰吉時)**; 2049; More Than Blue: The Series; The Pond (池塘怪談); Fragrance of the First Flower (第一次遇見花香的那刻)
**Best Television Film**: **Do Not Go Gentle in Taipei (台北過手無暝無日)**; Butterflies (公視新創短片- 蝴蝶); Steps of Youth (青春劇烈物語); Undercurrent (降河洄游); Solo Trekker (獨攀者)

==== Individual awards ====
**Best Directing for a Television Series** David Chuang and Allen Chen— Danger Zone (逆局)	**Best Writing for a Television Series** Yen Yi-wen, Kitten Huang and Fan Chih-chi — The Making of an Ordinary Woman 2 (俗女養成記2)
**Best Leading Actor in a Television Series**: **Chen Ya-lan — Lord Jiaqing and The Journey to Taiwan (嘉慶君遊台灣)** (Note: Chen Ya-lan became the first female performer in the awards history to be nominated for, and subsequently won in the category as Male character.); Berant Zhu — Danger Zone (逆局); Camake Valaule — Seqalu: Formosa 1867 (斯卡羅); Kuo Tzu-chien — Gold Leaf; Tony Yang — Light the Night; James Wen — Gold Leaf	**Best Leading Actress in a Television Series**: **Hsieh Ying-xuan — Heaven on the 4th Floor (四樓的天堂)**; Ruby Lin — Light the Night; Ricie Fun — Island Nation 2; Cheryl Yang — Light the Night; Hsieh Ying-xuan — The Making of an Ordinary Woman 2 (俗女養成記2)
**Best Supporting Actor in a Television Series**: **Christopher Lee — Danger Zone (逆局)**; Wu Kang-ren — Seqalu: Formosa 1867 (斯卡羅); Chen Chia-kuei — Heaven on the 4th Floor (四樓的天堂); Chang Kuang-chen — Light the Night; Liu Kuan-ting — Tears on Fire (火神的眼淚); Hsueh Shih-ling — Gold Leaf	**Best Supporting Actress in a Television Series**: **Sophia Li — Gold Leaf**; Sara Yu — The Making of an Ordinary Woman 2 (俗女養成記2); True Wang — Heaven on the 4th Floor (四樓的天堂); Annie Chen — Tears on Fire (火神的眼淚); Esther Liu — Light the Night; Hsieh Chiung-hsuan — Light the Night
**Best Newcomer in a Television Series**: **Selep Ljivangraw — Seqalu: Formosa 1867 (斯卡羅)**; Tammy Lin — Sometimes When We Touch (超感應學園); Chiang Chih-wei — Danger Zone (逆局); Chang Shu-yu — Tavern by the Lethe (孟婆客棧); Masegeseg Zingerur — Seqalu: Formosa 1867 (斯卡羅)	
**Best Directing for a Miniseries or Television Film** Hsieh Pei-ru — More Than Blue: The Series	**Best Writing for a Miniseries or Television Film** Deng Yi-han — Fragrance of the First Flower (第一次遇見花香的那刻)
**Best Leading Actor in a Miniseries or Television Film**: **Wu Pong-fong — Undercurrent (降河洄游)**; Wang Po-chieh — More Than Blue: The Series; Da-her Lin — The Pond (池塘怪談); Fandy Fan — More Than Blue: The Series; Tony Yang — Twisted Strings (良辰吉時)	**Best Leading Actress in a Miniseries or Television Film**: **Zaizai Lin — Fragrance of the First Flower (第一次遇見花香的那刻)**; Wang Yu-xuan — Do Not Go Gentle in Taipei (台北過手無暝無日); Yu Pei-jen — Butterflies (公視新創短片- 蝴蝶); Ivy Shao — More Than Blue: The Series; Janel Tsai — You Have To Kill Me (我是自願讓他殺了我)
**Best Supporting Actor in a Miniseries or Television Film**: **Bai Run-yin — More Than Blue: The Series**; **Huang Guan-zhi — Undercurrent (降河洄游)**; Duan Chun-hao — Twisted Strings (良辰吉時); Figaro Tseng — More Than Blue: The Series; Hsueh Shih-ling — You Have To Kill Me (我是自願讓他殺了我)	**Best Supporting Actress in a Miniseries or Television Film**: **Lyan Cheng — Fragrance of the First Flower (第一次遇見花香的那刻)**; Wang Chuan — Day by Day (公視人生劇展-無常日常); Angel Lee — Do Not Go Gentle in Taipei (台北過手無暝無日); Tracy Chou — Twisted Strings (良辰吉時); Eleven Yao — More Than Blue: The Series
**Best Newcomer in a Miniseries or Television Film**: **Louis Chiang — The Love's Outlet (愛的奧特萊斯)**; Phạm Thị Nội — Before and After (女兒牆); Yang Chih-yu — The Boy Q (公視新創短片-求仙記之南 Q 一夢); Yang Fu-chiang — Sister (公視人生劇展-姐妹); Chen Chong-en — Growing Pains (少年阿堯)	

==== Technical Awards ====
**Best Cinematography for a Drama Series** Lee Qing-di and Chou Yi-wen — The Making of an Ordinary Woman 2 (俗女養成記2)	**Best Editing for a Drama Series** Silvia Lin — Gold Leaf
**Best Lighting for a Drama Series** Ding Hai-de — Seqalu: Formosa 1867 (斯卡羅)	**Best Sound Design for a Drama Series** Chu Shih-yi, Liu Shiao-cao and Cao Ya-ning — Twisted Strings (良辰吉時)
**Best Art and Design for a Drama Series** Huang Wen-ying and Weng Ding-yang — Twisted Strings (良辰吉時)	**Best Costume Design for a Drama Series** Huang Wen-ying and Kao Hsian-ling — Twisted Strings (良辰吉時)
**Best Visual Effects for a Drama Series** Yan Cheng-qin — Seqalu: Formosa 1867 (斯卡羅)	**Best Score for a Drama Series** Sodagreen (under the name "Oaeen") — The Pond (池塘怪談)
**Best Theme Song**: **Ring and Hsiao-min — "Oysters Love Noodles" (from The Making of an Ordinary Woman 2 (俗女養成記2))**; Mavis Fan and Adam Hsu — "I Promise" (from Twisted Strings (良辰吉時)) (Note: Originally "I Promise" won the award, but due to creative differences, the award was eventually passed over to "Oysters Love Noodles" instead.); Won Fu — "Sayonara" (from The Making of an Ordinary Woman 2 (俗女養成記2)); Astro Bunny — "Be Yours" (from Rainless Love in a Godless Land (無神之地不下雨)); Salsa Chen, Tsai Chen-nan and Lin Bang-qi — "Wind" (from Seqalu: Formosa 1867 (斯卡羅)); Sodagreen (under the name "Oaeen") — "I’m Weird" (from The Pond (池塘怪談)); Waa Wei, Chen Chien-chi, David Ke and Jao Jui-chun — " Someone" (from Gold Leaf (茶金))	

==== Other Award ====
**Creative Award for a Drama Series**
- **Tavern by the Lethe (孟婆客栈)**
  - Tears on Fire (火神的眼淚)
  - The Making of an Ordinary Woman 2 (俗女養成記2)
  - Gold Leaf
  - Light the Night

=== Popularity Award ===
The winners for Most Popular Drama Series and Most Popular Variety Show are announced on the day of the ceremonies. Nomination period ran from September 7 to September 30, 2022. Viewers will then select their favorite drama series and television show from the 5 nominees in each category through the official voting website til October 20, 2022.

**Most Popular Drama Series** Tears on Fire (火神的眼淚) (31,339 votes)	**Most Popular Variety Show** Mr. Player (綜藝玩很大) (98,774 votes)
