= Toby Lee (actor) =

Taiwanese actor

- 李程彬
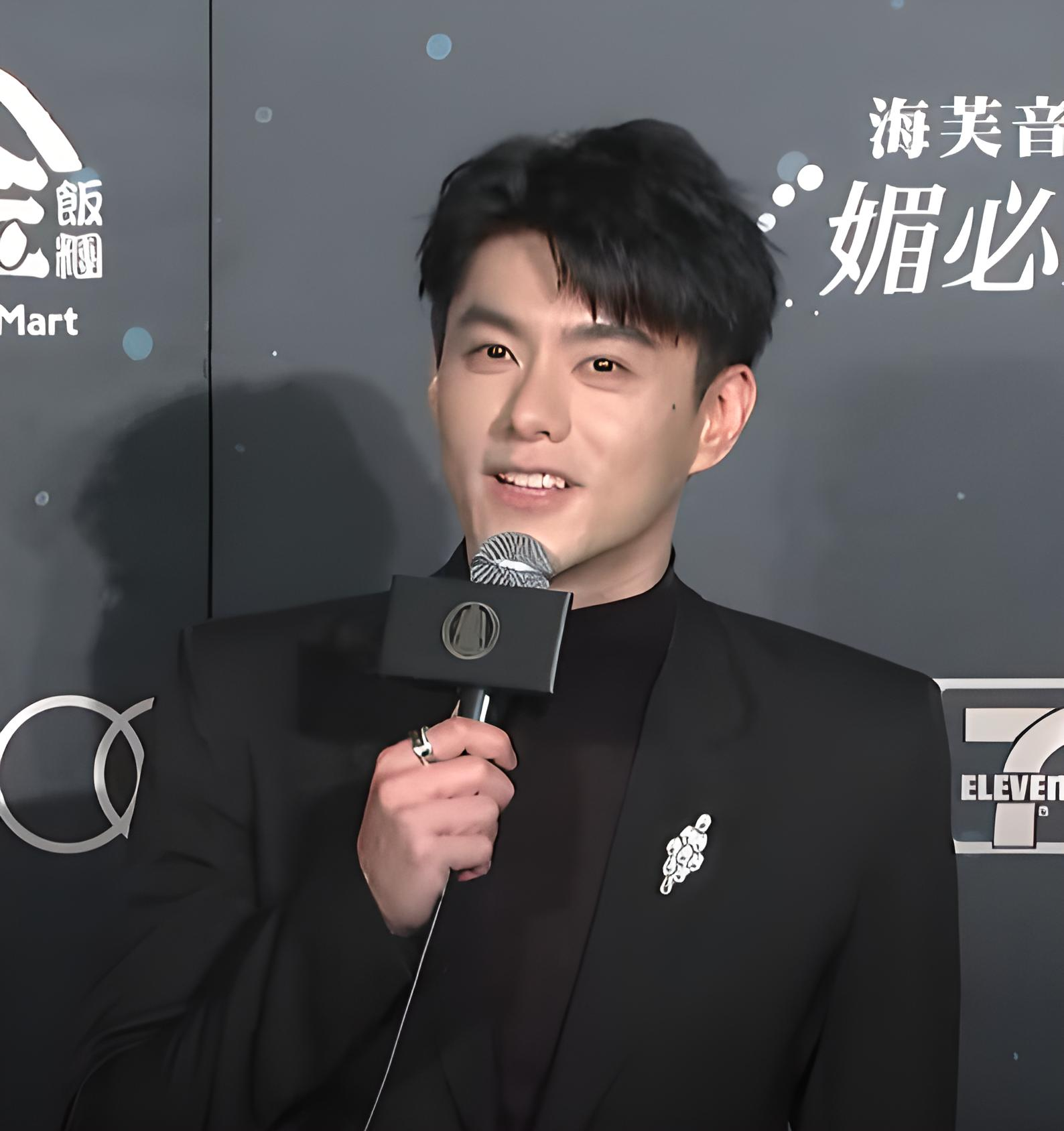
- Toby Lee at the 58th Golden Bell Awards in October 2023
- Born: Lee Ching-ban; November 22, 1987 (age 38); Jinhu Village, Kouhu, Yunlin County, Taiwan
- Other name: Li Chengbin
- Education: Kainan University
- Occupations: Actor; model
- Years active: 2011–present
- Agent: M.I.E. (Maximal International Entertainment)
- Awards: Golden Bell Awards – Best Actor in a Miniseries (or TV Film); 2023 Shards of Her

Chinese name
- Traditional Chinese: 李程彬
- Simplified Chinese: 李程彬
- Hanyu Pinyin: Lǐ Chéng-bīn

Lee Ching-ban (Chinese: 李程彬; pinyin: Lǐ Chéngbīn; born November 22, 1987), also known by his stage name Toby Lee or Li Chengbin, is a Taiwanese actor. He began his career in 2011 as a model and then appeared in multiple music videos. He is known for his roles in the award-winning feature film Soul Mate (2016), which earned him Best Newcomer nomination at the 34th Hundred Flowers Awards. In 2023, Lee won Best Actor in a Miniseries (or TV Film) award at the 58th Golden Bell Awards for his breakthrough dual role in Netflix original series Shards of Her (2022).

== Filmography ==
=== Film ===
Year	Title		Role	Notes	Ref.
Year	English	Original	Role	Notes	Ref.
2015	The Beloved	重生爱人	Lin Qiang	Supporting role	
2016	Mole of Life	黑白	killer	Supporting role	
2016	At Cafe 6	六弄咖啡館	Luo Jie	Supporting role	
2016	Happy Dorm	極樂宿舍	Gao Daren	Supporting role	
2016	Soul Mate	七月与安生	Su Jiaming	Main role	
2017	Love Off the Cuff	春嬌救志明	Dan, photographer	Support role	
2018	Transcendent	鏡像人明日青春	Xiao Sun	Main role	
2021	All About My Mother	关于我妈的一切	Zheng Yi	Supporting role	
2024	The Journey of Flower	花千骨	Bai Zihua	Main role	

=== Television series ===
Year	Title		Network	Role	Notes	Ref.
Year	English	Original	Network	Role	Notes	Ref.
2014	You Light Up My Star	你照亮我星球	FTV	Golden Horse Awards Best Actor Finalist	guest appearance	
2015	Be Famous For 15 Minutes	我的15分鐘	PTS	Tian'en	Main role	
2015	A Touch of Green	一把青	PTS	Jiao Fei	Supporting role	
2017	Operation Love	求婚大作战	Dragon Television, QQLive	Xiao Weizhe	Supporting role	
2018	Women in Shanghai	上海女子图鉴	Youku	Zhang Tianhao	Main role	
2018	Never Gone	原来你还在这里	Youku	Shen Ju'an	Main role	
2019	Arsenal Military Academy	烈火军校	iQIYI	Shen Junshan	Main role	
2020	Miss Truth	大唐女法医	Youku	Xiao Song	Main role	
2022	Shards of Her	她和她的她	Netflix	Li Haoming / Liu Changyu	Main role	
TBA	My Spicy Love	我的爱如此麻辣	iQIYI	Li Haoshan	Main role	

=== Music video appearances ===
Year	Artist	Song title
2011	Rainie Yang	The Summer in Spain
2011	Na Ying	Fall in Love When Flowers Bloom
2011	A-Lin	We Will Be Better
2012	Claire Kuo	The Next Miracle
2012	The Leader	Began a Lonely
2013	Aska Yang	Forget Me
2013	Michelle Chen	The Rose On The Cliff
2013	Joey Yung	Skylights
2017	Chloe Er	Triangle
2020	Kelly Yu	Testing Game
2023	JJ Lin	Happily, Painfully After

== Awards and nominations ==
Year	Award	Ceremony	Nominated work	Results	Ref.
2016	11th Chinese Young Generation Film Forum	Emerging Actor of the Year Award	Soul Mate	Nominated	
2017	14th Weibo Movie Night Awards	Outstanding New Actor	Soul Mate	Won	
2018	34th Hundred Flowers Awards	Best Newcomer	Soul Mate	Nominated	
2023	58th Golden Bell Awards	Best Leading Actor in a Miniseries or TV Film	Shards of Her	Won	
