= Golden Bell Award for Best Costume Design for a Drama Series =

Award for costume design for a drama series

- Awarded for: Best Costume Design for a Drama Series
- Location: Taiwan
- Presented by: Bureau of Audiovisual and Music Industry Development
- First award: 2022
- Currently held by: Pili Bing Feng Jue: Bloody Battle (2023)
- Website: gba.tavis.tw

The Golden Bell Award for Best Costume Design for a Drama Series (Chinese: 電視金鐘獎戲劇類節目造型設計獎) is one of the categories of the competition for Taiwanese television production, Golden Bell Awards. It was introduced in 2022.

== Winners ==
=== 2020s ===
Year	English title	Original title	Ref
2022; 57th Golden Bell Awards	Twisted Strings	良辰吉時	
2023; 58th Golden Bell Awards	Pili Bing Feng Jue: Bloody Battle	霹靂兵烽決之碧血玄黃	
