= Hsueh Shih-ling =

Taiwanese actor, rapper and host

- 薛仕凌
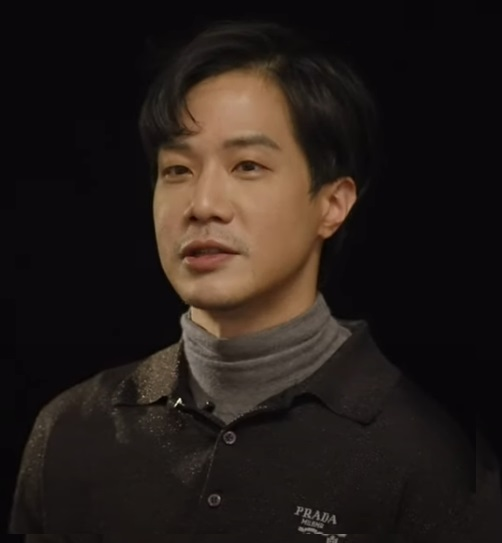
- Hsueh in December 2021
- Born: June 10, 1983 (age 43); Sanmin District, Kaohsiung, Taiwan
- Other name: 40, MC40
- Education: Fu Jen Catholic University
- Occupations: Actor; singer; rapper; songwriter; host
- Musical career
- Instruments: Vocals, drums, bass, guitar
- Years active: 2007–present
- Label: Da Hsi Entertainment
- Formerly of: Da Mouth

Chinese name
- Traditional Chinese: 薛仕凌
- Simplified Chinese: 薛仕凌
Transcriptions
Standard Mandarin
- Hanyu Pinyin: Xuē Shì Líng
Yue: Cantonese
- Jyutping: Sit3 Si6 Ling4
Southern Min
- Hokkien POJ: Sih Sū-lêng

Hsueh Shih-ling (Chinese: 薛仕凌; Pe̍h-ōe-jī: Sih Sū-lêng; born June 10, 1983), also known as 40 or MC40, is a Taiwanese actor, singer, rapper, songwriter, and television presenter.

Hsueh was known as MC40 from award-winning hip-hop band Da Mouth, with DJ Chung Hua, Harry Chang, and Aisa, before embarking on a career in acting. He writes most of Da Mouth's song lyrics and is considered one of the best and fastest rappers in Taiwan with his multi-language rapping ability.

At the 56th Golden Bell Awards in 2021, he took both best actor in a TV series for Born Into Loving Handsand best supporting actor in a miniseries for HBO Asia’s Workers. In 2023, he also took best supporting actor in ACA&GOTT Awards organized by Busan International Film Festival, and best actor in 58th Golden Bell Awards for Taiwan Crime Stories.

== Early life ==
Hsueh was born on June 10, 1983, in Sanmin District, Kaohsiung and was raised in Vancouver, British Columbia, Canada. He attended Fu Jen Catholic University Department of English, in New Taipei City, Taiwan. He speaks English, Mandarin and Taiwanese fluently. His Japanese and Spanish are at an elementary level. He has also performed in Hakka.

== Career ==
=== 2007–2016: Music Career ===
HSUEH signed with Universal Music Taiwan and formed the hip-hop band, Da Mouth, in 2007. The group released their debut self-titled album, "Da Mouth," on November 26, 2007. From 2007 to 2016, they released a total of 5 studio albums and 2 special albums. Most of the song lyrics were written by HSUEH.

Da Mouth won the Best Singing Group at the 19th Golden Melody Awards in 2008 and the 22nd Golden Melody Awards in 2011.

Due to health considerations and future planning, all four members of Da Mouth chose not to renew their contracts after the release of the 5th studio album, "What The…".

=== 2010–2016: Program hosting & acting ===
Hsueh began hosting the TV program in 2010. By 2016, he had hosted 6 TV programs, including the long-running entertainment news program Showbiz.

In 2011, Hsueh appeared in his first TV series, Pearls of Love. Subsequently, he concurrently and consecutively developed his singing, acting, and hosting career until the disbandment of Da Mouth.

=== 2016–present: Focusing on acting career ===
Hsueh currently focuses on acting. He says: "I think being an actor is to become the medium of the audience and cinematic storytelling. To connect the best of the both worlds and make the audiences feel relatable to the emotions of what's going on inside the movie. For example if you were to shoot lasers from your arms or have spider silk coming out from your arms. Does it hurt? Does it burn? Does it sting? Can you control it? I mean that is a lot of fun. And through acting and film magic, we can actually make the audience feel relatable."

From 2021 to 2023, Hsueh received 7 nominations and 4 awards for his acting:

In 2021, Hsueh won the Best Actor – TV Series for Born into Loving Hands and the Best Supporting Actor – Miniseries/TV Film for Workers at the 56th Golden Bell Awards, establishing himself as an actor known to audiences.

In 2022, Hsueh was nominated for Best Supporting Actor – TV Series for Gold Leaf and Best Supporting Actor – Miniseries/TV Film for You Have to Kill Me at the 57th Golden Bell Awards.

In 2023, he also won the Best Supporting Actor in the ACA&GOTT Awards organized by the Busan International Film Festival, and the Best Actor at the 58th Golden Bell Awards for Taiwan Crime Stories. His performance in Eye of the Storm earned him a nomination for Best Supporting Actor at the 2023 Taipei Film Awards.

Hsueh fearlessly tackles different roles and delivers multifaceted performances. He portrayed a construction worker, a 50s gay painter, and an infatuated yet scheming businessman, among others. Having recently completed the grand productions Born for the Spotlight, The World Between Us II, and Agent from Above. He is set to take the lead in Malice, a Taiwan-Indonesia-Czech Republic co-production.

== Personal life ==
In an interview in December 2021, Hsueh acknowledged that he has been in a relationship with a non-celebrity for 8 years and counting.

== Filmography ==
=== Film ===
Year	English title	Original title	Role	Notes
2009	L-O-V-E	愛到底	Introductor	
2012	Touch of the Light	逆光飛翔	Hsien	
2012	Letters to the Future	給未來的信	Hsien	Short film
2014	A Minute More	只要一分鐘	Nan	
2017	Please Love Her	請愛我的女朋友	Lawrence	
2017	Sakana Otoko	魚男	Hsiang Hsien-chih	Television film
2018	Single Day	哈囉！有事嗎	Pai Ying-chieh	
2019	The Teacher	我的靈魂是愛做的	Jo	
2019	RPG	最愛女人RPG	Lu Yen	
2022	You Have To Kill Me	我是自願讓他殺了我	Wang Yu-tse	Television film
2022	The Gunshots	鎗聲	Hao	Television film
2023	Workers: The Movie	做工的人電影版	Lai Han-chuan (Chuan)	
2023	Eye of The Storm	疫起	Chin Yu-chung	
2023	The Abandoned	查無此心	Huang Tung-chi	
2024	Pigsy	八戒	Pigsy	Animation (Voice Artist)
2025	Organ Child	器子	Wu	
2025	Unexpected Courage	我們意外的勇氣	Born (Po-en)	
in pre-production	Malice	惡潮	Ming-i	

=== Television series ===
Year	English title	Original title	Role	Notes
2011	Pearls of Love	珍愛林北	DJ	
2011	Office Girls	小資女孩向前衝	TV Host	
2011	Love SOS	戀愛SOS	Wang Ta-tung	
2012	Ti Amo Chocolate	愛上巧克力	Wei Li	
2013	Princess’Stand in	金大花的華麗冒險	Chin Ta-li	
2013	Love Around	真愛黑白配	James	
2014	You Light Up My Star	你照亮我星球	Shen Po-yu	
2015	Be with Me	舞吧舞吧在一起	TV Host	Line TV
2016	Prince of Wolf	狼王子	Chiang Ping	
2016	Chih Ming & Chun Chiao	志明與春嬌	Wang Chih-ming	Choco TV
2018	The Ex-Man	前男友不是人	Hsu Sheng-jen	
2018	Single Ladies Senior	高塔公主	Chang Shu-huai	
2020	Workers	做工的人	Chuan	HBO Go
2020	Born into Loving Hands	生生世世	Hsieh Yu-shu	
2021	Gold Leaf	茶金	Fan Wen-kuei	Netflix
2022	Twisted Strings	良辰吉時	Hung Yun-lung	HBO Go
2022	Shards of Her	她和她的她	Kuan Hsiang-li	Netflix
2022	Lesson in Love	第9節課	Li Ta-wei	iQIYI, Netflix
2023	Taiwan Crime Stories	台灣犯罪故事 －出軌	Lin Hsueh-ching	Disney+
2024	Born for the Spotlight	影后	Li Tzu-chi	Netflix
2025	Tabloid	死了一個娛樂女記者之後	Chuang Ta-hai	Netflix
2025	The World Between Us II	我們與惡的距離 II	Kao Cheng-kuang	Catchplay+
2026	Agent from Above	乩身	Wu Tien-chi	Netflix

=== Television hosting ===
Year	Title	Channel
2010	音樂這個讚	Channel V Taiwan
2010	音樂飆榜-西洋榜	Channel V Taiwan
2011	娛樂排排讚	Channel V Taiwan
2011	Campus Superman (校園SUPERMAN)	Channel V Taiwan
2016	LGBTalk Show	YouTube
2011-2016	ShowBiz	Sanlih E-Television

=== Music video appearances ===
Year	English title	Original title	Artist(s)
2010	Welcome	歡迎光臨	One Two Free
2011	3D Dancing Lost	3D舞力全失	One Two Free
2020	Until I Met You	直到我遇見了你	Yo Lee
2020	Walk with Me If You’re One of the Lonely Ones	孤獨的人我們一起出發	EggPlantEgg
2021	Prediction	預言	Tsai Huang-ru
2021	Stubborn Loneliness	倔強的孤單	Ricky Hsiao
2023	Embryo	成人	HUSH
2023	Insincere	言不由衷	Cyndi Wang

== Discography ==
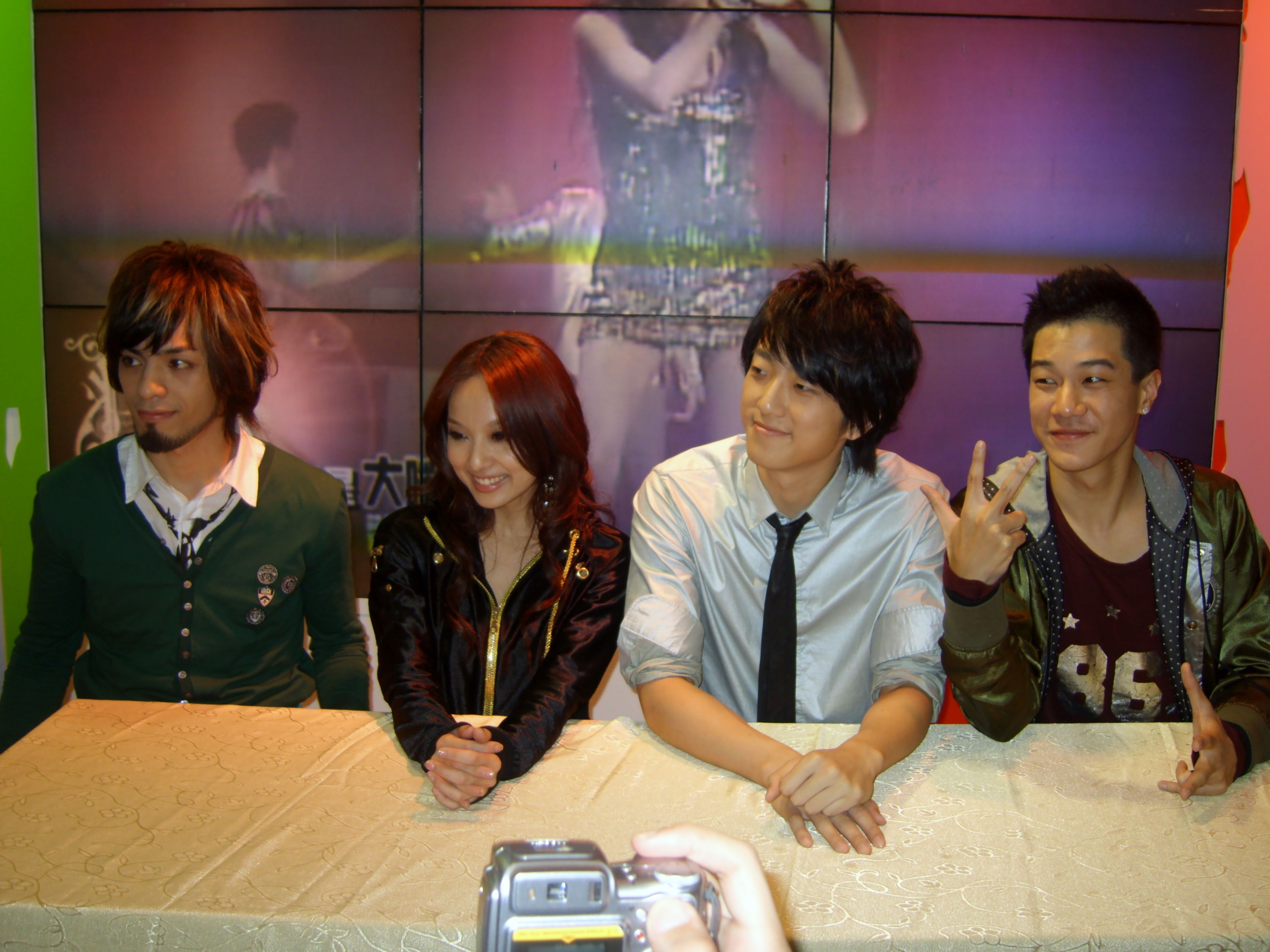
Hsueh (right), along with members of Da Mouth, 2007

=== Album ===
Album Information	Track listing
大嘴巴 (Da Mouth): Released: November 16, 2007; Format: CD; Label: Universal Music	Track listing: 1. The Starting 4; 2. 靠過來; 3. Get You Back; 4. 結果咧 (Intro version); 5. 結果咧; 6. Step On The Beat; 7. 我願意; 8. 我就是喜歡你; 9. Mr. Cool Boy; 10. 大嘴巴; 11. 119; 12. 無可取代; 13. 懷秋
王元口力口 (Player): Released: December 19, 2008; Format: CD; Label: Universal Music	Track listing: 1. Intro; 2. Da Now一場; 3. 國王皇后 (Puma Ad Song); 4. 緊箍咒; 5. 愛的宣言 (Kobayashi Glasses Ad Song); 6. 永遠在身邊; 7. Falling Like Dat; 8. Asalato Box; 9. We Wanna Party; 10. 小心眼; 11. Down; 12. You Are My Angel
万凸3 (One Two Three): Released: January 23, 2010; Format: CD; Label: Universal Music	Track listing: 1. 3010; 2. Rock It; 3. 喇舌; 4. Green Kicks; 5. 愛不愛我; 6. 搜尋遊戲; 7. 牽心的朋友; 8. Back To The Future; 9. 未來派對; 10. Turn Up The Music; 11. Happy Birthday My Dear; 12. ShInInG
流感 (Influence): Released: April 27, 2012; Format: CD; Label: Universal Music	Track listing: 1. 張大你的嘴巴; 2. 流感; 3. 你怕誰; 4. R u kiDdiNg mE; 5. Beautiful Luv; 6. Maybe 的機率; 7. 防衛心態; 8. Up 3x 9. BaBOO; 10. 最親的擁抱; 11. Baby Gnite
有事嗎？ (Back To The Future): Released: May 8, 2015; Format: CD; Label: Universal Music	Track listing: 1. DM111.6; 2. Funky那個女孩 (feat. Pauline Lan) (Let Dat Gal Go); 3. 有事嗎？（What The...）; 4. 魯蛇（Loser）; 5. BB Call; 6. 玩玩（Keep on Playing）; 7. 木目心（Thinking of You）; 8. 調調（Swag）; 9. Super不明（Super Boomin）; 10. 要壞掉了（I Wanna be Your Lover）; 11. 大告白（Confession）

=== Special Album ===
Album Information	Track listing
Japanese Album: DA Mouth -結局、どうなの～？: Released: March 6, 2009; Format: CD; Label: Universal Music	Track listing: 1. 結果咧 (Japanese Ver.); 2. 119; 3. 永遠在身邊; 4. 我就是喜歡你; 5. 國王皇后; 6. 緊箍咒; 7. 愛的宣言; 8. 懷秋; 9. We Wanna Party; 10. Mr. Cool Boy; 11. 靠過來; 12. Get You Back; 13. 結果咧 (Intro Ver.); 14. 結果咧
Greatest Hits Album: 首部曲 (Da First Episode): Released: October 8, 2010; Format: CD; Label: Universal Music	Track listing Disc1: 1. 永遠在身邊; 2. 結果咧 Intro; 3. 結果咧; 4. 國王皇后; 5. 喇舌; 6. 119; 7. 愛的宣言; 8. 我就是喜歡你; 9. Happy Birthday 買滴兒; 10. Rock It; 11. 首部曲Remix; Disc2: 1. 沒禮貌; 2. It's On; 3. 大創作家（by MC40）; 4. Dance To Da Beat Mr.DJ; 5. Secret Life（by Aisa／Aoyama Teruma）; 6. 臨時演員（by Harry）; 7. 結果咧（Japanese Remix）

=== Compositions（Composer or Lyricist） ===
Year	Song (Original title)	Singer	Lyricist	Composer
2007	靠過來	DaMouth	MC40	K.Y.B
2007	Get You Back	DaMouth	MC40	Andrew Chen
2007	結果咧	DaMouth	MC40	K.Y.B
2007	Step On The Beat	DaMouth	MC40	Andrew Chen
2007	我願意	DaMouth	MC40	K.Y.B
2007	我就是喜歡你	DaMouth	MC40	Andrew Chen
2007	大嘴巴	DaMouth	MC40	Adia
2007	119	DaMouth	MC40	Adia
2008	永遠在身邊	DaMouth	DaMouth	Soulja
2008	國王皇后	DaMouth	Harry Chang/ MC40 (rap part)	Adia
2008	緊箍咒	DaMouth	MC40	K.Y.B
2008	愛的宣言	DaMouth	MC40	Andrew Chen
2008	Da Now一場	DaMouth	MC40	terrytyelee
2008	Falling Like Dat	DaMouth	MC40	Andrew Chen
2008	We Wanna Party	DaMouth	MC40	Adia/Wei Jie Liao
2008	小心眼	DaMouth	MC40	Andrew Chen
2008	Down	DaMouth	MC40	Adia
2009	D.I.S.C.O	Yungai Hayung	Samuel/ MC40 (rap part)	Ken Gold/Michael Denne/ Teddy/Kush/TOP
2009	怪......不怪	Sky Wu	MC40	Sky Wu
2010	辦不到	Jane Zhang (feat. DaMouth)	Adia/MC40	Adia
2010	牽心的朋友	DaMouth	Sung-wei Ma/ MC40 (rap part)	Anthony Wen
2010	未來派對	DaMouth	MC40/Harry Chang	Adia
2010	Happy Birthday 買滴兒	DaMouth	MC40/Harry Chang	Ian Lee
2010	Rock It	DaMouth	MC40	K.Y.B
2010	喇舌	DaMouth	MC40	Adia
2010	Green Kicks	DaMouth	MC40	terrytyelee
2010	愛不愛我	DaMouth	MC40	Adia
2010	搜尋遊戲	DaMouth	MC40	K.Y.B
2010	Turn Up The Music	DaMouth	MC40	Adia
2010	Shining	DaMouth	MC40	Adia
2010	大創作家	MC40	MC40	TeN
2010	皮在癢	Sukie Chung	MC40	Ooi Teng Fong
2011	說愛就愛	Vaness	MC40/I-wei Wu	K.Y.B
2012	Beautiful Luv	DaMouth	MC40/Harry Chang	K.Y.B
2012	張大你的嘴巴	DaMouth	MC40	Starr Chen
2012	流感	DaMouth	MC40	Starr Chen
2012	你怕誰	DaMouth	MC40	Ooi Teng Fong
2012	R u kiDdiNg mE？	DaMouth	MC40	Starr Chen
2012	防衛心態	DaMouth	MC40	TeN
2012	Up 3x	DaMouth	MC40	Windy Wagner/ Shari Short/Tearce Kizzo
2012	BaBOO	DaMouth	MC40	Adia
2012	Baby Gnite	DaMouth	MC40	Ian Lee
2012	Play!	DaMouth	MC40	Starr Chen
2012	SpeXial	SpeXial	MC40	Starr Chen
2013	Gentleman	AK	MC40	Double-Y
2015	木目心	DaMouth	AJ/MC40 (rap詞)	Wei Jie Liao
2016	MAKE IT REAL	GBOYSWAG (feat.40)	40/GBOYSWAG	GBOYSWAG
2016	HOME Remix	Diana Wang (feat.40)	Skot Suyama/40	Skot Suyama

=== Collaborations ===
Year	Song title	Details
2009	哥本哈根的童話	Album: 哥本哈根的童話; Released: July 17, 2009; Participant(s): Chloe Wang, MC40
2016	MAKE IT REAL	Album: MAKE IT REAL; Released: December 3, 2016; Participant(s): Gboyswag, 40
2016	HOME Remix	EP: DIANA WANG; Released: December 16, 2016; Participant(s): Diana Wang, 40

=== Soundtrack contributions ===
Year	Song title	OST
2012	愛不愛我	Ti Amo Chocolate

== Awards and nominations ==
Year	Award	Category	Nominated work	Result
2008	19th Golden Melody Awards	Best Vocal Group	Da Mouth	Won
2009	20th Golden Melody Awards	Best Vocal Group	Player	Nominated
2011	22nd Golden Melody Awards	Best Vocal Group	One Two Three	Won
2021	56th Golden Bell Awards	Best Leading Actor in a Television Series	Born into Loving Hands	Won
2021	56th Golden Bell Awards	Best Supporting Actor in a Miniseries or Television Film	Workers	Won
2022	57th Golden Bell Awards	Best Supporting Actor in a Television Series	Gold Leaf	Nominated
2022	57th Golden Bell Awards	Best Supporting Actor in a Miniseries or Television Film	You Have To Kill Me	Nominated
2023	25th Taipei Film Awards	Best Supporting Actor	Eye of the Storm	Nominated
2023	58th Golden Bell Awards	Best Leading Actor in a Television Series	Taiwan Crime Stories	Won
2023	Asia Contents Awards & Global OTT Awards	Best Supporting Actor	Taiwan Crime Stories	Won
2024	1st Golden Wolf Music Video Awards	Best Actor	Embryo	Nominated
