= Hsieh Ying-xuan =

Taiwanese actress

- 謝盈萱
- Hsieh in 2026
- Born: 31 December 1979 (age 46); Changhua, Taiwan
- Education: Taipei National University of the Arts
- Occupation: Actress
- Years active: 2010–present

Chinese name
- Traditional Chinese: 謝盈萱
- Simplified Chinese: 谢盈萱
- Hanyu Pinyin: Xiè Yíngxuān

Hsieh Ying-xuan (Chinese: 謝盈萱; pinyin: Xiè Yíngxuān; born 31 December 1979) is a Taiwanese actress. She won Best Leading Actress at the 55th Golden Horse Awards for her performance in the film Dear Ex (2018), as well as Best Leading Actress at the 57th Golden Bell Awards for her performance in the series Heaven on the 4th Floor.

== Filmography ==
=== Film ===
Year	English title	Original title	Role	Notes/Ref.
2010	Au Revoir Taipei	一頁台北	Man Man / Hsieh Li-ting	
2011	Through the Night	在夜的盡頭	Woman	Short film
2012	Including Her Out	華麗緣		Short film
2013	Taipei Factory(A Nice Travel)	臺北工廠	A Beautiful Journey	
2013	Winds In the City Lights	城市風裡的光	Liang Pei-yu	"PTS Life Story" (TV Movie)
2014	Consracy	時下暴力	Ms. Bai	
2015	Office	華麗上班族	Office worker	
2016	My Egg Boy	我的蛋男情人	The Lady	
2016	Ace of Sales	銷售奇姬	Mary	
2016	The Sweet Place	加蓋春光	Shuang	"PTS Life Story" (TV Movie)
2017	Beautiful Accident	美好的意外	Ms. Zhao	
2017	The Juice Dealer	錢莊聽來的事	Xiang	"PTS Original - Shorts" (TV short film)
2018	Back to the Good Times	花甲大人轉男孩	Stacy	
2018	Dear Ex	誰先愛上他的	Liu San-lian	
2018	To Pluto	冥王星圖	Fang Huan	Short film
2018	Tail End of the Year	年尾巴	Elder aunt-in-law	"PTS Original - Shorts" (TV short film)
2018	Mama Pingpong Social Club	媽媽桌球	Club president	Short film
2019	Nina Wu	灼人秘密	Casting director	
2019	Fabulous 40	一起衝線	Wang Fen-ni	
2020	Little Big Women	孤味	Chen Wan-qing	
2022	Salute	我心我行		Special appearance
2023	Eye of the Storm	疫起	Chief of Surgery	
2024	A Place Called Silence	默殺：無聲之地	Policewoman	

=== Television series ===
Year	English title	Original title	Network	Role	Notes
2005	Taipei Family	住左邊住右邊	SET Metro	The customer of sushi bar	
2006	The Magicians of Love	愛情魔髮師	SET Metro	Fashion Stylist	Cameo
2011	The Invaluable Treasure, 1949	瑰寶1949	PTS	Wen Li-jou	
2015	Be Famous for 15 Minutes	我的15分鐘	PTS	Kelly	
2015	Wake Up	麻醉風暴	PTS	Song Shao-ying	
2017	Q Series - Life Plan A and B	植劇場－荼蘼	TTV, GTV, PTS	Ms. Zhang	
2017	Lion Dance	起鼓·出獅	PTS	Lee Tsai-Chi	
2018	Q Series - A Boy Named Flora A	植劇場－花甲男孩轉大人	TTV, GTV, PTS	Stacy	
2018	Love is in the Air	幸福，近在咫尺	Tencent Video	Wei Jie	
2018	My Goddess	種菜女神	IQIYI, TTV, EBC	Sung Chiao-en	
2019	Green Door	魂囚西門	PTS	Yu Hsiu-chi	
2019	The Making of an Ordinary Woman	俗女養成記	CTS	Chen Chia-ling	
2021	The Making of an Ordinary Woman 2	俗女養成記2	CTS	Chen Chia-ling	
2021	Heaven on the 4th Floor	四樓的天堂	PTS	Chang Chi	
2023	Wave Makers	人選之人—造浪者	Netflix	Wen-fang Weng	
2024	Born for the Spotlight	影后	Netflix	Hsueh Ya-chi	
2025	Forget You Not	忘了我記得	Netflix	Cheng Le-le	

== Awards and nominations ==
Year	Award	Category	Nominated work	Result	Ref.
2015	50th Golden Bell Awards	Best Supporting Actress in a Miniseries or Television Film	Wake Up	Nominated	
2016	51st Golden Bell Awards	Best Leading Actress in a Miniseries or Television Film	The Sweet Place	Nominated	
2018	53rd Golden Bell Awards	Best Leading Actress in a Miniseries or Television Film	The Juice Dealer	Nominated	
2018	53rd Golden Bell Awards	Best Supporting Actress in a TV Series	Q Series - A Boy Named Flora A	Nominated	
2018	55th Golden Horse Awards	Best Leading Actress	Dear Ex	Won	
2018	20th Taipei Film Awards	Best Actress	Dear Ex	Won	
2019	10th To Ten Chinese Films Festival	Best Performance by an Actress in a Leading Role	Dear Ex	Nominated	
2019	19th Chinese Film Media Awards	Best Actress	Dear Ex	Nominated	
2019	Youth Film Handbook Awards	Best Actress	Dear Ex	Nominated	
2019	54th Golden Bell Awards	Best Actress in a Miniseries or TV Film	Green Door	Nominated	
2020	55th Golden Bell Awards	Best Actress in a TV Series	The Making of an Ordinary Woman	Nominated	
2020	57th Golden Horse Awards	Best Supporting Actress	Little Big Women	Nominated	
2022	57th Golden Bell Awards	Best Leading Actress in a Television Series	The Making of an Ordinary Woman 2	Nominated	
2022	57th Golden Bell Awards	Best Leading Actress in a Television Series	Heaven on the 4th Floor	Won	
