= Golden Bell Award for Best Leading Actress in a Miniseries or Television Film =

Award for leading actress in a miniseries or television film

- Location: Taiwan
- Presented by: Golden Bell Awards
- Currently held by: Hsu Wei-ning for Shards of Her (2023)

This is a list of winners and nominees of the Golden Bell Award for Best Leading Actress in a Miniseries or Television Film (Chinese: 金鐘獎迷你劇集（電視電影）女主角獎; pinyin: Jīn zhōng jiǎng mínǐ jù jí (diànshì diànyǐng) nǚ zhǔjiǎo jiǎng).

== Winners and nominees ==
=== 2000s ===
Year	Actress	English title	Original title	Ref
2007; 42nd Golden Bell Awards
2007; 42nd Golden Bell Awards	Lin Shih-hui	A Lonely Game	畢業生系列－寂寞的遊戲	
2007; 42nd Golden Bell Awards	Chiu Hsiu-min	Finding Pali	公視人生劇展：尋找巴利	
2007; 42nd Golden Bell Awards	Chang So-li	Nyonya's Taste of Life	公視人生劇展：娘惹滋味	
2007; 42nd Golden Bell Awards	Love Fang	Nyonya's Taste of Life	公視人生劇展：娘惹滋味	
2007; 42nd Golden Bell Awards	Huang Rou-min	Calling 223	呼叫223	
2008; 43rd Golden Bell Awards
2008; 43rd Golden Bell Awards	Ivy Yin	Talking With Your Boyfriend's Ex-Girlfriend	公視人生劇展：與男友的前女友密談	
2008; 43rd Golden Bell Awards	Angel Ho	Ai Shuo Huang De Ni Ke	公視人生劇展：愛說謊的妮可	
2008; 43rd Golden Bell Awards	Li Hsuan	Xie Zu	公視人生劇展：蟹足	
2008; 43rd Golden Bell Awards	Chen Po-chen	Xun Fu Ji	馴富記	
2008; 43rd Golden Bell Awards	Wanfang	Long Vacation	公視人生劇展：長假	
2009; 44th Golden Bell Awards
2009; 44th Golden Bell Awards	Lin Chao-yu	The Hairdresser on the Mountain	公視人生劇展－山上的理髮師	
2009; 44th Golden Bell Awards	Vicky Chen	Test-Tube Immortal	試管神仙	
2009; 44th Golden Bell Awards	Mei Fang	Honey Brew Of Osmanthus Flowers	客家電視電影院－桂花釀	
2009; 44th Golden Bell Awards	Yang Kuei-mei	Young Spirit of a Taiwanese Opera	青春歌仔	
2009; 44th Golden Bell Awards	Hsiao Ai	Zui Ai Jiu Shi Ni	公視人生劇展－最愛就是你	

=== 2010s ===
Year	Actress	English title	Original title	Ref
2010; 45th Golden Bell Awards
2010; 45th Golden Bell Awards	Lee Chia-ying	Smile	看見天堂	
2010; 45th Golden Bell Awards	Lin Mei-chao	Ji De Wo Men Ai Guo	記得我們愛過	
2010; 45th Golden Bell Awards	Sean Hung	Woman	客家電視電影院－女人家	
2010; 45th Golden Bell Awards	Emily Tsai	Birthday Wish	公視人生劇展－生日願望	
2010; 45th Golden Bell Awards	Pan Li-li	The Addict	大愛劇場－逆子	
2011; 46th Golden Bell Awards
2011; 46th Golden Bell Awards	Ann Lee	Life Is Not a Fairytale	大愛長情劇展—仙女不下凡	
2011; 46th Golden Bell Awards	Lin Mei-hsiu	Your Eyes My Hands	大愛長情劇展—你的眼我的手	
2011; 46th Golden Bell Awards	Chou Heng-yin	Revenge of the Factory Woman	與愛別離	
2011; 46th Golden Bell Awards	Chuang Ching-chu	The Old Couple	客家電視電影院—老伴	
2011; 46th Golden Bell Awards	Peggy Tseng	Revenge of the Factory Woman	與愛別離	
2012; 47th Golden Bell Awards
2012; 47th Golden Bell Awards	Lu Hsueh-feng	The Golden Child	金孫	
2012; 47th Golden Bell Awards	Jade Chou	The Happy Life of Debbie	黛比的幸福生活	
2012; 47th Golden Bell Awards	Helen Thanh Đào	My Little Honey Moon	野蓮香	
2012; 47th Golden Bell Awards	Francesca Kao	No Way Home	公視學生劇展—離家的女人	
2012; 47th Golden Bell Awards	Esther Liu	The Golden Child	金孫	
2013; 48th Golden Bell Awards
2013; 48th Golden Bell Awards	Ivy Yin	The Will to Power	公視人生劇展—權力過程	
2013; 48th Golden Bell Awards	Pai Bing-bing	When Mom Visits	那天媽媽來看我	
2013; 48th Golden Bell Awards	Zhu Zhi-ying	A Place in the Sun	公客家電視電影院—日光天堂	
2013; 48th Golden Bell Awards	Yu Pei-jen	The Busy Young Psychic	公視學生劇展—神算	
2013; 48th Golden Bell Awards	Yang Hsiao-li	Substitute For Love	公視人生劇展—愛情替聲	
2014; 49th Golden Bell Awards
2014; 49th Golden Bell Awards	Lee Kang-i	Dawn / Spring	曉之春	
2014; 49th Golden Bell Awards	Ivy Yin	Almost Heaven	公視人生劇展—回家的女人	
2014; 49th Golden Bell Awards	Ho Sho-lan	My Old Boy	公視人生劇展—只想比你多活一天	
2014; 49th Golden Bell Awards	Cheng Chia-yu	Ming Xie Hui Gu	公視人生劇展—銘謝惠顧	
2014; 49th Golden Bell Awards	Megan Lai	Proposal	公視人生劇展—家事提案	
2015; 50th Golden Bell Awards
2015; 50th Golden Bell Awards	Mei Fang	Water Source	公視人生劇展—水源地	
2015; 50th Golden Bell Awards	Yen Yi-wen	Angel's Radio	公視人生劇展—天使的收音機	
2015; 50th Golden Bell Awards	Wen Chen-ling	The Kids	公視人生劇展—小孩	
2015; 50th Golden Bell Awards	Megan Lai	The End of Love	公視人生劇展—愛情的盡頭	
2015; 50th Golden Bell Awards	Yen Yi-wen	Mother's Practiced Tune	公視人生劇展—母親練習曲	
2016; 51st Golden Bell Awards
2016; 51st Golden Bell Awards	Zhu Zhi-ying	The Black Box	客家電視電影院－黑盒子	
2016; 51st Golden Bell Awards	Ivy Yin	The Island of River Flow	川流之島	
2016; 51st Golden Bell Awards	Ko Su-yun	The Cat in the Closet	公視人生劇展-衣櫃裡的貓	
2016; 51st Golden Bell Awards	Mei Fang	Laugh for 24 Hours	公視人生劇展-藥笑24小時	
2016; 51st Golden Bell Awards	Hsieh Ying-hsuan	The Sweet Place	公視人生劇展-加蓋春光	
2017; 52nd Golden Bell Awards
2017; 52nd Golden Bell Awards	Hsu Wei-ning	In Love - Infatuation	滾石愛情故事－鬼迷心竅	
2017; 52nd Golden Bell Awards	Kuo Shu-yao	The Teenage Psychic	通靈少女	
2017; 52nd Golden Bell Awards	Annie Chen	The Long Goodbye	公視人生劇展－告別	
2017; 52nd Golden Bell Awards	Cheryl Yang	In Love - New Everlasting Love	滾石愛情故事－新不了情	
2017; 52nd Golden Bell Awards	Wen Chen-ling	The Last Verse	最後的詩句	
2018; 53rd Golden Bell Awards
2018; 53rd Golden Bell Awards	Fang Yu-hsin	Far and Away: Lover's Choices	外鄉女-愛人的選擇	
2018; 53rd Golden Bell Awards	Amber An	Nguyen Thi Bich Hoa and Her Two Men	華視金選劇場-阮氏碧花與她的兩個男人	
2018; 53rd Golden Bell Awards	Lu Yi-ching	A-Tsuí & Kok-Siông	阿水和國祥	
2018; 53rd Golden Bell Awards	Hsieh Ying-xuan	The Juice Dealer	公視新創電影-錢莊聽來的事	
2018; 53rd Golden Bell Awards	Aviis Zhong	The Substitute	替身	
2019; 54th Golden Bell Awards
2019; 54th Golden Bell Awards	Ivy Yin	On Children: The Last Day of Molly	你的孩子不是你的孩子-茉莉的最後一天	
2019; 54th Golden Bell Awards	Wang Chuan	Mama Pingpong Social Club	媽媽桌球	
2019; 54th Golden Bell Awards	Peace Yang	Lethe	華視金選劇場－忘川	
2019; 54th Golden Bell Awards	Hsieh Ying-xuan	Green Door	魂囚西門	
2019; 54th Golden Bell Awards	Chung Hsin-ling	On Children: Child of the Cat	你的孩子不是你的孩子-貓的孩子	

=== 2020s ===
Year	Actress	English title	Original title	Ref
2020; 55th Golden Bell Awards	Esther Huang	Kill for Love	追兇500天	
2020; 55th Golden Bell Awards	Bella Wu	The Making of An Ordinary Woman	俗女養成記	
2020; 55th Golden Bell Awards	Wu Yi-jung	Dear Orange	客家電視電影院－大桔大利 闔家平安	
2020; 55th Golden Bell Awards	Yogurt Lee	The Rootless	無主之子	
2020; 55th Golden Bell Awards	Hsieh Ying-xuan	The Making of An Ordinary Woman	俗女養成記	
2021; 56th Golden Bell Awards	Hsu Yen-ling	Hakka Cinema - The Child of Light	客家電影院－光的孩子	
2022; 57th Golden Bell Awards	Zaizai Lin	Fragrance of the First Flower	第一次遇見花香的那刻	
2023; 58th Golden Bell Awards	Hsu Wei-ning	Shards of Her	她和她的她	
2023; 58th Golden Bell Awards	Gingle Wang	Wave Makers	人選之人—造浪者	
2023; 58th Golden Bell Awards	Kimi Hsia	On Marriage: Mary's Merry Marriage	你的婚姻不是你的婚姻：梅莉	
2023; 58th Golden Bell Awards	Sun Ke-fang	On Marriage: Wishful Syncing	你的婚姻不是你的婚姻-聖筊	
2023; 58th Golden Bell Awards	Lu Yi-ching	To the Sea	看海	
