= Copycat Killer (TV series) =

Taiwanese crime thriller series

- 模仿犯
- Genre: Crime thriller
- Based on: The Copycat by Miyuki Miyabe
- Starring: Wu Kang-ren
- Country of origin: Taiwan
- Original language: Mandarin
- No. of seasons: 1
- No. of episodes: 10

Production
- Editor: Shieh Meng-ju

Original release
- Network: Netflix
- Release: March 31, 2023

Copycat Killer (模仿犯) is a Taiwanese crime thriller series that was released on Netflix on March 31, 2023. Set in 1990s Taipei, the series stars Wu Kang-ren as a prosecutor trying to track down a serial killer. The series was adapted from the 2001 novel The Copycat by Japanese writer Miyuki Miyabe.

== Synopsis ==
In 1990s Taipei, prosecutor Kuo Hsiao-chi tries to track down a serial killer named "Noh".

== Cast ==
- Wu Kang-ren as Kuo Hsiao-chi
- Tuo Tsung-Hua as Shang-Yong Lin
- Cammy Chiang as Yen-Jhen Lu
- Chia-Yen Ko
- Hsia Teng-hung
- Fandy Fan
- Ruby Lin as Ya-Cih Yao
- Yao Chun-yao as Chen He-ping

== Critical reception ==
Cinema Express' Mrinal Rajaram gave the series 3.5 stars out of 5, praising the "multifaceted" exploration of its theme, but noting that the series was too drawn out. Decider's Joel Keller criticised the meandering plotlines in the first episode, noting that it made the story difficult to follow. South China Morning Post's James Marsh praised the performances, calling Wu "perfectly cast as the white knight prosecutor".

Copycat Killer won four awards at the 58th Golden Bell Awards including "Most Popular Drama Series".
