= Ting Chiang =

Taiwanese actor (1936–2023)

Ting Chiang (Chinese: 丁強; 26 April 1936 – 27 January 2023) was a Taiwanese actor.

Ting was nominated for the Golden Bell Award for Best Leading Actor in a Miniseries or Television Film in 2001, 2007, and 2010, winning for his role in 2001's Remember, Forget. Ting and his wife Li Hsuan last appeared together in the 2021 television series Tears on Fire.

Ting suffered from a fall at home, where he was recuperating from a minor stroke, and was sent to a hospital, where he died on 27 January 2023, at the age of 86.

== Selected filmography ==
- Four Loves (1965)
- Remember, Forget (2001)
- Crystal Boys (2003 TV series and 2013 stage play), based on the novel of the same name.
- Time Lapse (2009)
- War Game 229 (2011)
- A Hint of You (2013)
- All in 700 (2016)
- The Bold, the Corrupt, and the Beautiful (2017)
- Tears on Fire (2021)
