= Golden Bell Award for Best Score for a Drama Series =

Award for musical score for a drama series

- Awarded for: Best Score for a Drama Series
- Location: Taiwan
- Presented by: Bureau of Audiovisual and Music Industry Development
- First award: 2022
- Currently held by: Taiwan Crime Stories (2023)
- Website: gba.tavis.tw

The Golden Bell Award for Best Score for a Drama Series (Chinese: 電視金鐘獎戲劇配樂獎) is one of the categories of the competition for Taiwanese television production, Golden Bell Awards. It was introduced in 2022.

== Winners ==
=== 2020s ===
Year	English title	Original title	Ref
2022; 57th Golden Bell Awards	The Pond	池塘怪談	
2023; 58th Golden Bell Awards	Taiwan Crime Stories	台灣犯罪故事	
