= Golden Bell Award for Best Leading Actor in a Miniseries or Television Film =

Award for leading actor in a miniseries or television film

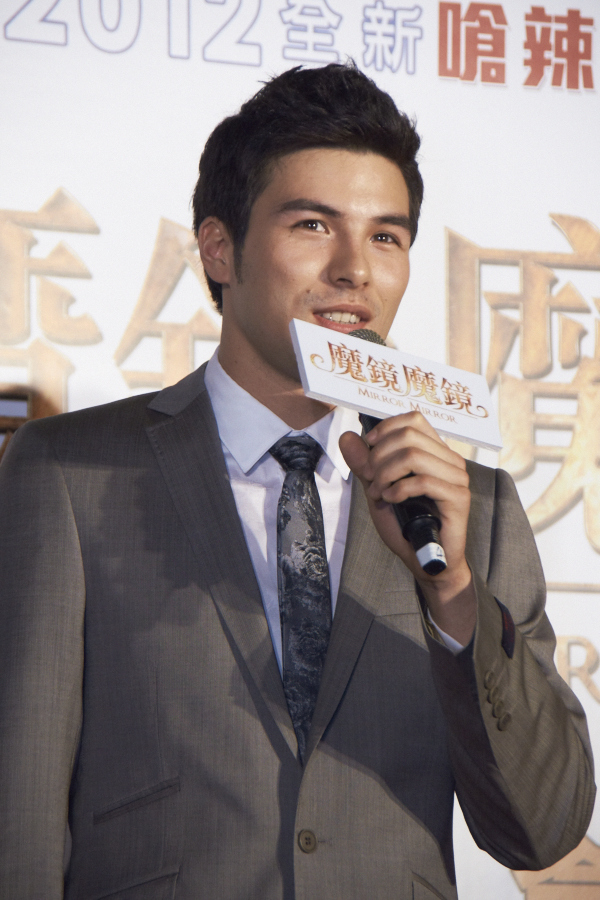
- The 2025 recipient: Rhydian Vaughan
- Awarded for: Outstanding Lead Actor of the Year in a Miniseries or Television Film
- Country: Taiwan
- Presented by: Golden Bell Awards
- First award: 2001
- Currently held by: Rhydian Vaughan for The Cleaner (2025)
- Website: gba.tavis.tw

This is a list of winners and nominees of the Golden Bell Award for Best Leading Actor in a Miniseries or Television Film (Chinese: 金鐘獎迷你劇集／電視電影男主角獎).

== Winners and nominees ==
=== 2010s ===
Year	Actor	English title	Original title	Ref
2011; 46th Golden Bell Awards
2011; 46th Golden Bell Awards	Chin Shih-chieh	17th Exit	公視人生劇展—十七號出入口	
2011; 46th Golden Bell Awards	Sean Huang	Days We Stared at the Sun	他們在畢業的前一天爆炸	
2011; 46th Golden Bell Awards	Wu Pong-fong	Ranger	公視人生劇展—歸‧途	
2011; 46th Golden Bell Awards	Kuo Tzu-chien	6 Ju Xia Ban	公視人生劇展—6局下半	
2011; 46th Golden Bell Awards	Huang Ching-kuei	Swaying Bamboo Forest	原視生命劇展—飄搖的竹林	
2012; 47th Golden Bell Awards
2012; 47th Golden Bell Awards	Christopher Lee	Forgotten	遺忘	
2012; 47th Golden Bell Awards	Bamboo Chen	My Little Honey Moon	野蓮香	
2012; 47th Golden Bell Awards	Tuo Tsung-hua	Ba Ba Jia You	大愛長情劇展—爸爸加油	
2012; 47th Golden Bell Awards	River Huang	The Princess and the Prince	公視人生劇展—公主與王子	
2012; 47th Golden Bell Awards	Victor Huang	Fly Pigeon	公視人生劇展—飛吧！鴿子	
2013; 48th Golden Bell Awards
2013; 48th Golden Bell Awards	Tai-Bo	The Best Thing	公視學生劇展—最好的一件事	
2013; 48th Golden Bell Awards	Lung Shao-hua	Laba Hong's Melody	公視人生劇展—喇叭宏的悲喜曲	
2013; 48th Golden Bell Awards	Wang Meng-lin	Do You Know?	公視人生劇展—阿弟仔，知道不知道	
2013; 48th Golden Bell Awards	Liang Hsiu-shen	The Will to Power	公視人生劇展—權力過程	
2013; 48th Golden Bell Awards	Bi Xiao-hai	Fresh Meat Pie	公視學生劇展—鮮肉餅	
2014; 49th Golden Bell Awards
2014; 49th Golden Bell Awards	Shih Ming-shuai	The Free Man	公視學生劇展—自由人	
2014; 49th Golden Bell Awards	Wang Jui	My Old Boy	公視人生劇展—只想比你多活一天	
2014; 49th Golden Bell Awards	Kao Meng-chieh	Almost Heaven	公視人生劇展—回家的女人	
2014; 49th Golden Bell Awards	River Huang	Cigarette Ends	菸蒂	
2014; 49th Golden Bell Awards	Jason King	The Iron Concorde	公視人生劇展—無敵戰艦協和號	
2015; 50th Golden Bell Awards
2015; 50th Golden Bell Awards	Easton Dong	Angel's Radio	公視人生劇展—天使的收音機	
2015; 50th Golden Bell Awards	Kaiser Chuang	The Road Home	公視人生劇展—回家路上	
2015; 50th Golden Bell Awards	Kaiser Chuang	An Outing	公視學生劇展—出遊	
2015; 50th Golden Bell Awards	Jag Huang	Wake Up	麻醉風暴	
2015; 50th Golden Bell Awards	Frankie Huang	Let the Sunshine In	公視人生劇展—浪子單飛	
2016; 51st Golden Bell Awards
2016; 51st Golden Bell Awards	Roy Chiu	In Love - The Last Gentleness	滾石愛情故事-最後一次溫柔	
2016; 51st Golden Bell Awards	Lee Tien-chu	Lost Daughter	公視人生劇展-再見女兒	
2016; 51st Golden Bell Awards	Chang Shao-huai	The Thin Blue Lines	奉子不成婚	
2016; 51st Golden Bell Awards	Joe Chang	The Black Box	客家電視電影院－黑盒子	
2016; 51st Golden Bell Awards	Rexen Cheng	The Island of River Flow	川流之島	
2017; 52nd Golden Bell Awards
2017; 52nd Golden Bell Awards	Wu Kang-jen	We Are One	望月	
2017; 52nd Golden Bell Awards	Christopher Lee	The Long Goodbye	公視人生劇展－告別	
2017; 52nd Golden Bell Awards	Alex Ko	Far and Away - Dark Beauty	外鄉女-黑美人	
2017; 52nd Golden Bell Awards	Fu Meng-po	The Last Verse	最後的詩句	
2017; 52nd Golden Bell Awards	Lan Wei-hua	The Cage	公視學生劇展－鴿籠	
2018; 53rd Golden Bell Awards
2018; 53rd Golden Bell Awards	Edison Song	Ghost High School	恐怖高校劇場之直播中二間	
2018; 53rd Golden Bell Awards	Wu Chien-ho	Days We Stared at the Sun II	他們在畢業的前一天爆炸2	
2018; 53rd Golden Bell Awards	Chen Bor-jeng	A-Tsuí & Kok-Siông	阿水和國祥	
2018; 53rd Golden Bell Awards	Chang Han	PTS Innovative Story: The Stranger	公視學生劇展－一步之遙	
2018; 53rd Golden Bell Awards	Lan Wei-hua	Where the Sun Don't Shine	公視人生劇展－青苔	
2019; 54th Golden Bell Awards
2019; 54th Golden Bell Awards	Wu Pong-fong	PTS Life Story: The Roar	公視人生劇展－第一響槍	
2019; 54th Golden Bell Awards	Chen Yi-wen	PTS Original Shorts: A Taxi Driver	公視新創短片－暴好人	
2019; 54th Golden Bell Awards	Yu An-shun	PTS Innovative Story: Two Funerals	公視學生劇展－兩場葬禮	
2019; 54th Golden Bell Awards	Pan Chin-Yu	PTS Originals: The Defender	公視新創電影－無法辯護	
2019; 54th Golden Bell Awards	Lan Wei-hua	A Cold Summer Day	華視金選劇場－夏之橘	

=== 2020s ===
Year	Actor	English title	Original title	Ref
2020; 55th Golden Bell Awards	Honduras	PTS Life Story: Ah Chin	公視人生劇展 — 盲人阿清	
2020; 55th Golden Bell Awards	Joseph Chang	Nowhere Man	罪夢者	
2020; 55th Golden Bell Awards	Mo Tzu-Yi	Kill for Love	追兇500天	
2020; 55th Golden Bell Awards	Bamboo Chen	PTS Life Story: Viatical Settlement	公視人生劇展 — 殘值	
2020; 55th Golden Bell Awards	Yu An-shun	PTS Original Shorts: Lucky Draw	新創電影短片 — 大吉	
2021; 56th Golden Bell Awards	Christopher Lee	Workers	做工的人	
2021; 56th Golden Bell Awards	An Yuan-liang	Hakka Cinema: The Child of Light	光的孩子	
2021; 56th Golden Bell Awards	Li Li-jung	See You, Sir	主管再见	
2021; 56th Golden Bell Awards	Tang Chuan	The Era Where I Live	窝卡	
2021; 56th Golden Bell Awards	Liu Kuan-ting	Dear Loneliness	致親愛的孤獨者: 小薰	
2022; 57th Golden Bell Awards	Wang Po-chieh	More Than Blue: The Series	比悲伤更悲伤的故事：影集版	
2022; 57th Golden Bell Awards	Wu Pong-fong	Undercurrent	降河洄游	
2022; 57th Golden Bell Awards	Da-her Lin	The Pond	池塘怪谈	
2022; 57th Golden Bell Awards	Fandy Fan	More Than Blue: The Series	比悲伤更悲伤的故事：影集版	
2022; 57th Golden Bell Awards	Yo Yang	Twisted Strings	良辰吉时	
2023; 58th Golden Bell Awards	Kou Fung	Who Says That Momma Is Like the Moon?	茁劇場-誰說媽媽像月亮	
2023; 58th Golden Bell Awards	Toby Lee	Shards of Her	她和她的她	
2023; 58th Golden Bell Awards	Kaiser Chuang	Bonus Trip	額外旅程	
2023; 58th Golden Bell Awards	Liu Kuan-ting	On Marriage: Wishful Syncing	你的婚姻不是你的婚姻-聖筊	
2023; 58th Golden Bell Awards	Lan Wei-hua	On Marriage: Marriage No.1314	你的婚姻不是你的婚姻-尾號1314	
