= Jen Li-yu =

Jen Li-yu (Chinese: 任立渝; born 27 January 1945) is a retired Taiwanese meteorologist who worked for the Central Weather Bureau and became the first weather presenter in Taiwan to have been trained as a meteorologist.

== Career ==
Jen was born in Chongqing and studied atmospheric science at Chinese Culture University. After completing his degree, Jen joined the Central Weather Bureau in 1968, and later led the agency's weather forecasting center from 1981–93. He spent 25 years with the Central Weather Bureau. Upon retiring from the agency in 1993, Jen was hired by Taiwan Television to present the weather. He was the first professional meteorologist to serve as a weather presenter in Taiwan. Prior to Jen's hiring by TTV, television stations in Taiwan would often have newscasters read data complied by the Central Weather Bureau. Jen's success as a weather presenter led many other television stations to employ dedicated weather presenters. After leaving TTV in 1997, Jen worked for China Television until 2006 and Chinese Television System until 2009. Jen made his last broadcast on 31 May 2021, for TVBS.

At the 56th Golden Bell Awards ceremony for television, held in October 2021, Jen was recognized with the Golden Bell Award for special contributions. He was the first meteorologist to receive a Golden Bell accolade.
