= Golden Bell Award for Best Television Series =

Taiwanese television award

- Awarded for: Best Television Series of the Year
- Location: Taiwan
- Presented by: Golden Bell Awards
- Currently held by: Born for the Spotlight (2025)

The Golden Bell Award for Best Television Series (Chinese: 電視金鐘獎戲劇節目獎) is one of the categories of the competition for the Taiwanese television production, Golden Bell Awards. It is presented annually by the Government Information Office, Taiwan. The first time that the television programs were first eligible to be awarded was in 1971.

== Winners and nominees ==
TV Series program winners from 1971 to 1982 were not included in the list. For more information, see also: Golden Bell Awards list of winners

=== 1980s ===
- 1984: Star Knows My Heart
  - The Misty Rain of Jiangnan
  - That Tender Age
- 1985: Porters
  - Rivers, Mountains, Spring Mornings
  - Star's Hometown
- 1986: Cloud's Hometown
  - One Plum Blossom
  - The Blue and the Black
- 1987: Another Sound
  - How Many Beautiful Sunsets
  - The Fortune Family
- 1988: Father Forgive Me
  - Deep Garden
  - Xi Shi
- 1989: Moment in Peking
  - The August Blossom
  - Return the Pearl to Thee

=== 1990s ===
Note: Between 1993 and 1999, television and radio awards were presented in alternate years.

- 1990: Spring Passes and Returns
  - The Wife-Chasing Trio
  - My Son Junxiao
- 1991: Mute Wife
  - Biographies of Assassins: Jingke
  - The Last Imperial Love
- 1992: The Four Brothers of Peking
  - Xueke
  - Tales About Qianlong
- 1993: The Book and the Sword
  - Continued Fate of Love
  - Unforgettable Emotions
- 1995: Brothers by Destiny
  - Tales About Cixi
  - Everlasting Like Earth and Heaven
- 1997: The Daughter-in-Law to Persuade the World
  - This Life, This World
  - Romance of Taiwan
  - The First Clan
  - Flowers Fall, Flowers Bloom
- 1999: Spring Is Like Stepmother's Heart
  - Dream of the Red Chamber
  - Love Is Payable
  - God Loves Good People
  - Salt Farm Children

=== 2000s ===
- 2000: Ever
  - Relatives Don't Bicker
  - The Defeated Name
  - State of Divinity
  - A Boat in the Ocean
- 2001: Crouching Tiger, Hidden Dragon
  - Rogue Professor
  - World Affectionate
  - Big Hospital, Little Doctors
  - Beigang Censer
- 2002: Bi Ya Su Na
  - True Love
  - The Sun Shines on the Back of the Mountain First
  - Chaste Woman, Fierce Woman, Carefree Woman
  - The Cold Night
- 2003: Crystal Boys
  - New Bud
  - Jingui
  - Friends
  - Home
- 2004: Banquet
  - Two Fish Swimming Ashore
  - Dana Sakura
  - Wintry Night II
  - The Rose
- 2005: A Cinematic Journey
  - A Story of Soldiers
  - Love's Lone Flower
  - Fifi
  - Say Yes Enterprise
- 2006: Holy Ridge
  - Lovelorn High Heels
  - Bump Off Lover
  - A..S..T..
  - Spring in Grass Mount
- 2007: Dangerous Mind
  - The Chinese Money Tree Blooms
  - The Beautiful Sunrise
  - The Hospital
  - Life Away from Home
- 2008: Fated to Love You
  - Wayward Kenting
  - Mom's House
  - Tobacco Field Youths
  - Huang Jinxian
- 2009: Black & White
  - Justice for Love
  - Police et vous
  - My Queen
  - Marriage for Three Women

=== 2010s ===
- 2010: Moonlight of Brotherhood
  - Rock Baby
  - Hi My Sweetheart
  - The Kite Soaring
  - Year of the Rain
- 2011: Somewhere over the Sky
  - The Fierce Wife
  - Scent of Love
  - The Invaluable Treasure 1949
  - Love You
- 2012: In Time with You
  - Man Boy
  - Garden of Life
  - Innocence
  - Way Back into Love
- 2013: Falling
  - Flavor of Life
  - End of Innocence
  - An Innocent Mistake
  - Home
- 2014: Boys Can Fly
  - Amour et Patisserie
  - In a Good Way
  - Sun After the Rain
  - Lonely River
- 2015: The Way We Were
  - C.S.I.C.: I Hero
  - Apple in Your Eye
  - Long Day's Journey into Light
  - Brave Forward
- 2016: A Touch of Green
  - Ba Ji Teenagers
  - Marry Me, or Not?
  - Sunset
  - The Best of Youth
- 2017: Close Your Eyes Before It's Dark
  - Abula
  - Game
  - Love of Sandstorm
  - Family Time
- 2018: A Boy Named Flora A
  - Songs and the City
  - Roseki
  - Wake Up 2
  - Age Of Rebellion
- 2019: The World Between Us
  - Utopia For The 20s
  - Survive
  - A Taste to Remember
  - A Taiwanese Tale of Two Cities

=== 2020s ===
- 2020: Someday Or One Day
  - Yong-jiu Grocery Store
  - The Victims' Game
  - Hate The Sin, Love The Sinner
  - The Mirror
- 2021: The Magician on the Skywalk
  - U Motherbaker
  - Girls Win
  - Animal Whisper
  - Stay for Love
- 2022: Seqalu: Formosa 1867
  - The Making of an Ordinary Woman 2
  - Gold Leaf
  - Danger Zone
  - Light the Night
- 2023: Mad Doctor
  - Oxcart Trails
  - Taiwan Crime Stories
  - The Amazing Grace of Σ
  - Copycat Killer
- 2024: Living
  - Oh No! Here Comes Trouble
  - At The Moment
  - Gourmet Affairs
  - A Wonderful Journey
- 2025: Born for the Spotlight
  - The Outlaw Doctor
  - Us Without Sex
  - Our Honorary Photo Studio
  - I Am Married... But!
