= 56th Golden Bell Awards =

Award ceremony

- Date: October 2, 2021; 17:00 NST (red carpet); 19:00 NST (awards ceremony)
- Site: Sun Yat-sen Memorial Hall, Taipei, Taiwan
- Hosted by: Retina
- Preshow hosts: Huang Hao-ping; Gladys Tsai
- Organized by: Bureau of Audiovisual and Music Industry Development

Television coverage
- Network: Sanlih E-Television (Host Network; Cable/Online); Public Television Service (Terrestrial)

The 56th Golden Bell Awards (Chinese: 第56屆金鐘獎) was held on October 2, 2021, at the Sun Yat-sen Memorial Hall in Taipei, Taiwan. The ceremony was televised by Sanlih E-Television (Cable/Online) and Public Television Service (Terrestrial); it was hosted by news anchor and online personality Retina (Shi Wang-mo).

== Winners and nominees ==
Below is the list of winners and nominees for the main categories

| Best Television Series: The Magician on the Skywalk (天橋上的魔術師) | Best Miniseries: Workers (做工的人) |
| Best Television Film: See You, Sir (主管再见) | Best Variety Show: DD52 (菱格世代DD52) |
| Best Reality or Game Show: All Star Sports Day (全明星運動會) | |
| Best Leading Actor in a Television Series: Hsueh Shih-ling — Born Into Loving Hands (生生世世) | Best Leading Actress in a Television Series: Chung Hsin-ling — U Motherbaker (我的婆婆怎麼那麼可愛) |
| Best Supporting Actor in a Television Series: Darren Chiu — U Motherbaker (我的婆婆怎麼那麼可愛) | Best Supporting Actress in a Television Series: Jian Man-shu — The Arc Of Life (她們創業的那些鳥事) |
| Best Newcomer in a Television Series: Li Yi-chiao — The Magician on the Skywalk (天橋上的魔術師) | |
| Best Leading Actor in a Miniseries or Television Film: Christopher Lee — Workers (做工的人) | Best Leading Actress in a Miniseries or Television Film: Hsu Yen-ling — Hakka Cinema - The Child of Light (客家電影院－光的孩子) |
| Best Supporting Actor in a Miniseries or Television Film: Hsueh Shih-ling — Workers (做工的人) | Best Supporting Actress in a Miniseries or Television Film: Esther Huang — Who Killed the Good Man (大债时代) |
| Best Newcomer in a Miniseries or Television Film: Yu Chia-hsuan — No Flowers or Seasons (公視迷你電影院 – 家庭式) | |
| Best Host for a Variety Show: Jesse Tang, Aaron Yan and Sandy Wu — 36 Questions (36題愛上你) | Best Host for a Reality or Game Show: Sam Tseng — A Wonderful Word (一字千金) |
| Special Contribution Award: Jen Li-yu | |
