= 55th Golden Bell Awards =

Award ceremony

- Date: September 26, 2020; 17:00 NST (red carpet); 19:00 NST (awards ceremony)
- Site: Sun Yat-sen Memorial Hall, Taipei, Taiwan
- Hosted by: Sabrina Pai; Gino Tsai; Vicky Tseng; Chen Guan-lin; Lulu Huang Lu Zi Yin; Crowd Lu; Sam Tseng; Aaron Yan
- Preshow hosts: Huang Hao-ping; Patty Lee
- Organized by: Bureau of Audiovisual and Music Industry Development

Television coverage
- Network: Sanlih E-Television; Public Television Service

The 55th Golden Bell Awards (Chinese: 第55屆金鐘獎) was held on September 26, 2020, at the Sun Yat-sen Memorial Hall in Taipei, Taiwan. The ceremony was televised by Sanlih E-Television and Public Television Service; it was jointly hosted by Sabrina Pai, Gino Tsai, Vicky Tseng, Chen Guan-lin, Lulu Huang Lu Zi Yin, Crowd Lu, Sam Tseng and Aaron Yan.

== Winners and nominees ==
Below is the list of winners and nominees for the main categories.

Best Television Series: Someday or One Day	Best Miniseries: The Making of an Ordinary Woman (俗女養成記)
Best Television Film: Newly Created Short Film - Daji (新創電影短片 - 大吉)	Best Variety Show: Hits (綜藝大熱門)
Best Reality or Game Show: National Star Raiders (全民星攻略)	
Best Leading Actor in a Television Series: Yao Chun-yao — The Mirror (鏡子森林)	Best Leading Actress in a Television Series: Ko Chia-yen — Someday or One Day
Best Supporting Actor in a Television Series: Mario Pu — Island Nation	Best Supporting Actress in a Television Series: Janel Tsai — Hate the Sin, Love the Sinner (噬罪者)
Best Newcomer in a Television Series: Moon Lee — The Victims' Game	
Best Leading Actor in a Miniseries or Television Film: Yu An-shun — Newly Created Short Film - Daji (新創電影短片 - 大吉)	Best Leading Actress in a Miniseries or Television Film: Wu Yi-jung — Hakka TV Cinema - Da Orange Dali Family Peace (客家電視電影院－大桔大利 闔家平安)
Best Supporting Actor in a Miniseries or Television Film: Yu An-shun — Blind Ah Qing (公視人生劇展－盲人阿清)	Best Supporting Actress in a Miniseries or Television Film: Sara Yu — The Making of an Ordinary Woman (俗女養成記)
Best Newcomer in a Miniseries or Television Film: Bai Xiao-ying — Article 1 of the Household Convention (住戶公約第一條)	
Best Host for a Variety Show: Hsieh Hsin-hao and Chen Tai-hsiang — Taiwan Jin Song (台灣金頌)	Best Host for a Reality or Game Show: Sam Tseng and Gladys Tsai — National Star Raiders (全民星攻略)
Lifetime Achievement Award: Xiao Fengxian; Lin I-hsiung	
