= Bureau of Audiovisual and Music Industry Development =

Government agency based in Zhongzheng, Taipei, Taiwan

- 文化部影視及流行音樂產業局; Wénhuàbù Yǐngshìjí Liú''''xíng Yīnyuè Chǎnyèjú
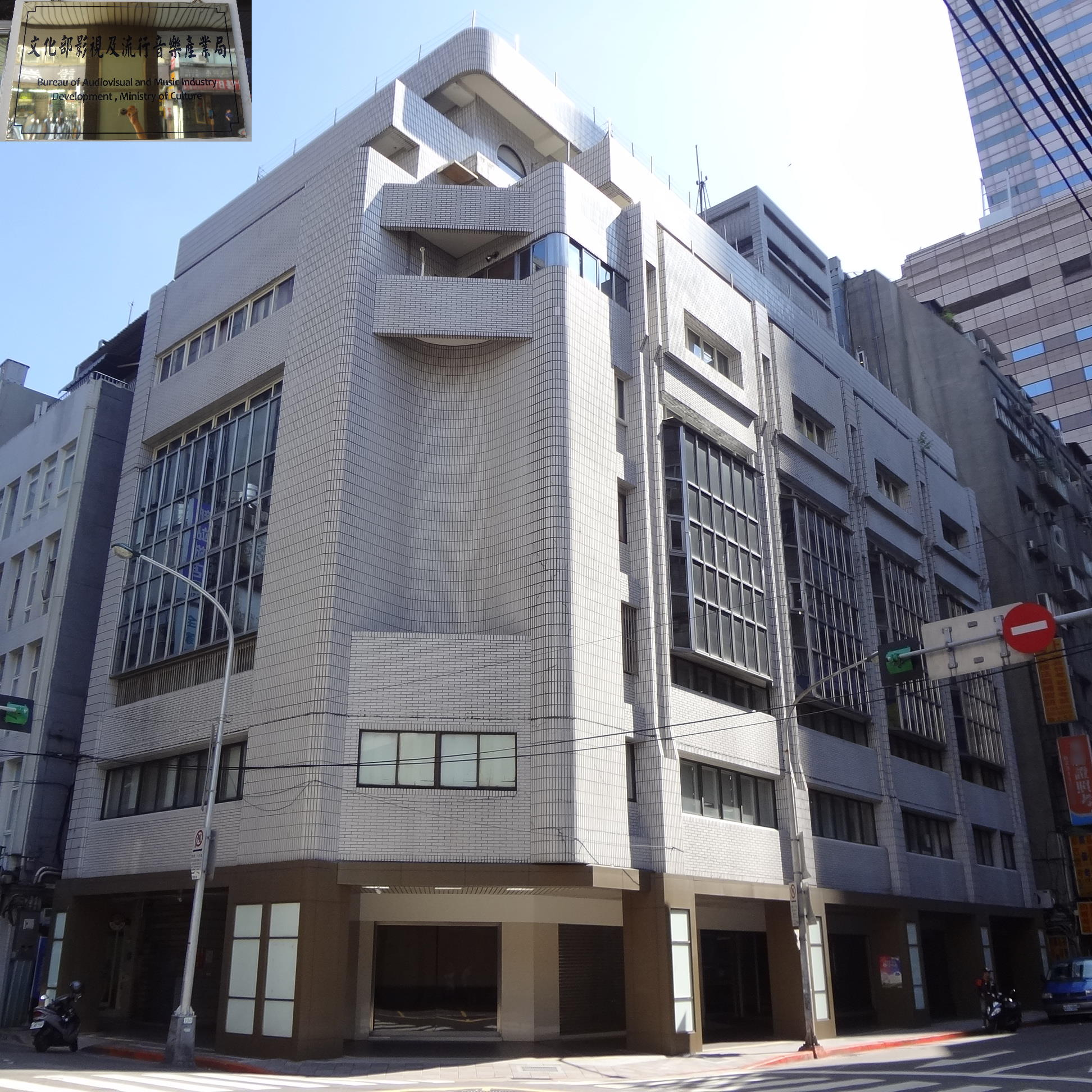

Agency overview
- Formed: 22 May 2012
- Jurisdiction: Taiwan
- Headquarters: Zhongzheng, Taipei, Taiwan; 25°05′N 121°28′E
- Agency executive: Chu Wen-ching, Director
- Parent agency: Ministry of Culture
- Website: www.bamid.gov.tw (in Chinese)

The Bureau of Audiovisual and Music Industry Development (BAMID; traditional Chinese: 文化部影視及流行音樂產業局; simplified Chinese: 文化部影视及流行音乐产业局; pinyin: Wénhuàbù Yǐngshìjí Liúxíng Yīnyuè Chǎnyèjú) is the bureau of the Ministry of Culture of the Republic of China responsible for supervising and promoting film, broadcasting, television and popular music sectors of Taiwan.

== History ==
The BAMID was inaugurated on 22 May 2012 by Minister of Culture Lung Ying-tai.

== Transportation ==
The bureau is accessible within walking distance west from Taipei Main Station.

== See also ==
- Ministry of Culture (Taiwan)
- Music of Taiwan
