= List of newspapers in Taiwan =

This is a list of newspapers published in Taiwan.

After Apple Daily (蘋果日報) ceased print publication in 2021, there are currently three major daily newspapers: the Liberty Times (自由時報), United Daily News (聯合報), and China Times (中國時報). In addition, there are two major business-focused, financial newspapers: the Commercial Times (工商時報) and Economic Daily News (經濟日報).

After competitors Taiwan News ceased print publication in 2010 and The China Post in 2015, Taipei Times (英文台北時報) remains the only major English-language newspaper in Taiwan.

== Corporate media ==
=== Major Chinese-language newspapers ===
Name	Chinese names	Owner	Established	Circulation	Editorial stance	Party support in 2020 presidential election
Liberty Times	自由時報	Liberty Times Group	1980	529,178	Liberal, pro-DPP, supports Taiwan independence, anti-China, friendly to Japan	Democratic Progressive Party
United Daily News	聯合報	United Daily News Group	1951	N/A, ceased publication in 2020.	Conservative, pro-KMT, supports friendly cross-strait relations	Kuomintang
China Times	中國時報	Want Want China Times Group	1950	135,000	Conservative, pro-KMT, pro-China, supports friendly cross-strait relations	Kuomintang

- Commercial Times (工商時報): established in 1978, part of Want Want China Times media group
- Economic Daily News (經濟日報): established in 1967, part of United Daily News group

=== English-language newspaper ===
- Taipei Times (英文台北時報): established in 1999, part of Liberty Times Group

Competitors Taiwan News ceased print publication in 2010 and The China Post in 2015.

== Government-owned media ==
=== Chinese news media ===
- Central News Agency (中央通訊社) – National news agency of Taiwan (Republic of China)
- Kinmen Daily News (金門日報) – in Kinmen, operated by Kinmen County Government.
- Matsu Daily (馬祖日報) – in Matsu Islands, operated by Lienchiang County Government.
- Youth Daily News (青年日報) – operated by the Ministry of National Defense

=== English news media ===
- Focus Taiwan – operated by the Central News Agency (Taiwan)

== Other newspapers ==
- China Daily News (中華日報) – in Tainan (Southern Taiwan)
- Mandarin Daily News (國語日報) – a children-facing news paper, all Traditional Chinese characters are annotated with Mandarin Phonetic Symbols.
- The Epoch Times (大紀元時報)
- Taiwan Times (臺灣時報) – in Kaohsiung (Southern Taiwan)
- The Epoch Times – New York City
- Chinese Christian Tribune (基督教論壇報) - a leading Christian newspaper

== Online newspapers ==
- Apple Daily (蘋果日報) – Major daily newspaper which ended print publication in 2021 and switched to all-digital format
- Central Daily News (中央日報) – operated by Kuomintang, a political party, began operations from 1945 in Taiwan, ceased print publication in 2006
- Independence Evening Post (自立晚報) – printed newspaper until 2001
- The China Post (英文中國郵報) – former English-language newspaper, ended its print publication in 2017 and switched to all-digital format
- Taiwan Daily (台灣日報) – print publication ended in June 2006
- Taiwan News (台灣英文新聞) – former English-language newspaper, ended print publication in 2015 and switched to all-digital format
- The News Lens (關鍵評論網)
- Funscreen Weekly (放映週報)

== Defunct newspapers ==
- China Times Express (中時晚報) – in the same group as China Times, published between 1988 and 2005
- Min Sheng Bao (民生報)
- United Evening News (聯合晚報) – in the same group as United Daily News, ceased publication in 2020

== See also ==
- Media of Taiwan
- Television in Taiwan
- National Communications Commission
- Central News Agency (Taiwan)
