= Left Behind (A-Mei song) =

Taiwanese song

"身後"

Song by A-Mei

from the album Story Thief (偷故事的人)
- English title: Left Behind
- Composer(s): JJ Lin
- Lyricist(s): HUSH

“Left Behind” (身後) is a song by Taiwanese singer A-Mei Chang, included in her album The Story Thief (偷故事的人), and is the fourth wave hit of the album. It was written by HUSH, composed by JJ Lin, and directed by Luo Jingnian.On December 26, 2017, a video clip of the making of the music video, titled "That Breathtaking Missing, You Must Have Been There", was released on the YouTube website.On December 28, the official video clip of the music video was released, with more than 200,000 hits in a short period of time. On the same day, A-Mei posted a live message on her Facebook page, On the same day, A-Mei posted a live message on her Facebook page, in which she revealed how much she missed her family.

== Behind the Scenes ==
The first two-thirds of the video were shot in first-person perspective and long shots. The set design was to condense the last journey of the deceased into a microcosmic tunnel, with six scenes of imagery, namely the morgue, the inside of the freezer, the flowers surrounding the funeral, the inside of the coffin, the inside of the crematorium, and the inside of the tower of the bones, and then finally to return to the reality of the vast seaside.

== Anecdotes ==
- At the beginning of the music video, the clock hanging on the wall is after 11 o'clock, and the calendar hanging on the other side of the wall reads "March 28th", the time of the Little Bulb Incident(小燈泡事件), the random killing of girls in Neihu.
- According to Youth Daily, the record company said that originally A-Mei wanted to play the role of the mother in the plot of the music video, but the planning team was afraid that it would affect the audience's emotions, so it was dismissed; "Left Behind" is also the highest production cost of the whole album of "The Story Thief" music video, nearly NT$6 million.

== Awards ==
- 2018 The 29th Golden Melody Awards Best Music Video Award
- 2018 Red Dot Design Award
- 2018 Mnet Asian Music Awards (MAMA) Best Director of the Year Award
