= Lin Sheng Xiang =

Taiwanese singer-songwriter (born 1971)

Lin Sheng Xiang 林生祥
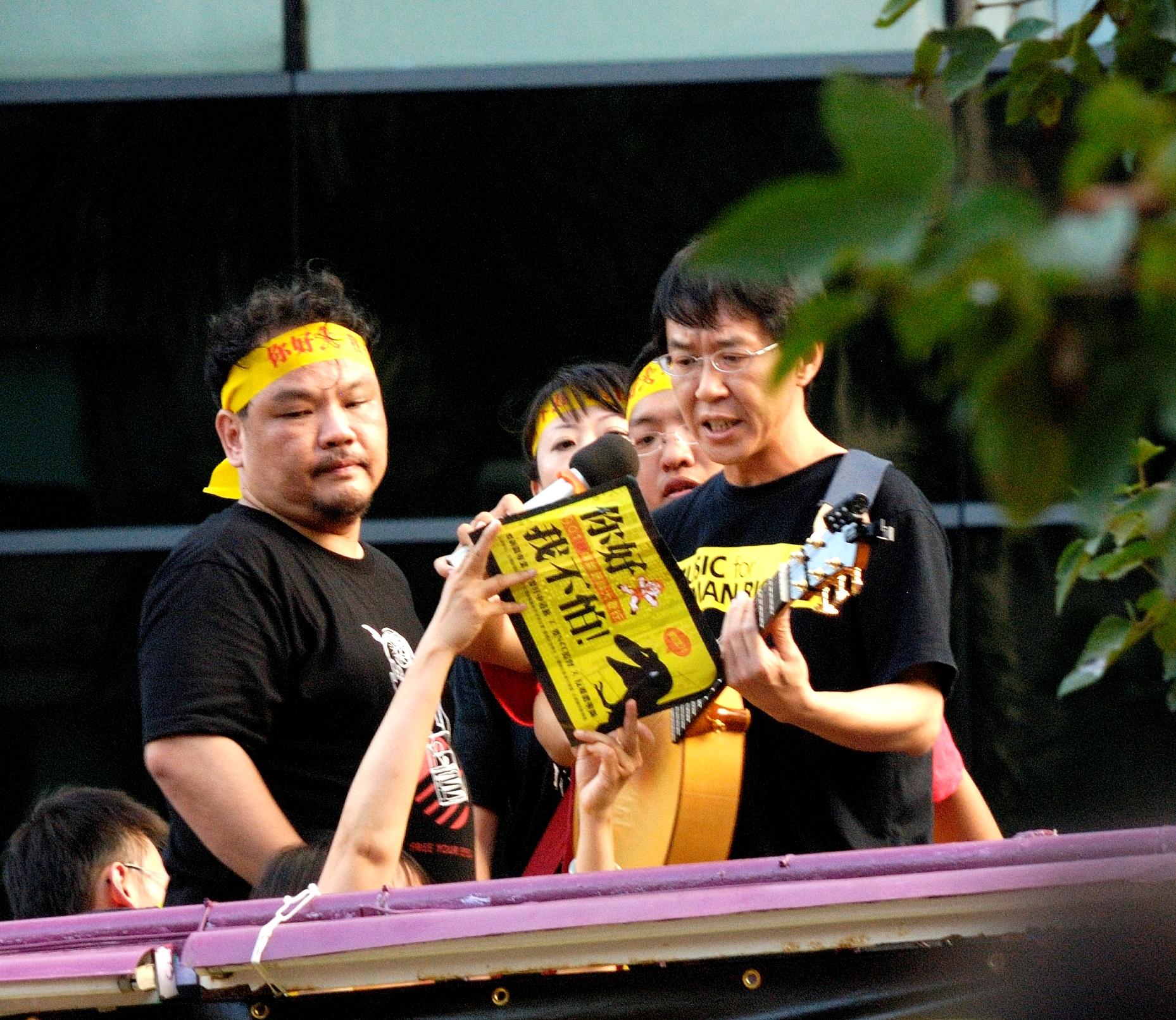
- Lin Sheng Xiang (right) sings the anti-media monopoly war song at the Anti-Media Monopoly March.

Background information
- Born: November 25, 1971 (age 54); Taiwan
- Occupations: Singer, musician, lyricist, composer
- Instruments: Yueqin, Singer

Lin Shengxiang (Mandarin: 林生祥)(November 25, 1971–) is an independent music composer born in Meinong, Kaohsiung, Taiwan, known for his Hakka compositions sung in the Hakka language, which are concerned with his hometown.

== Biographic sketch ==
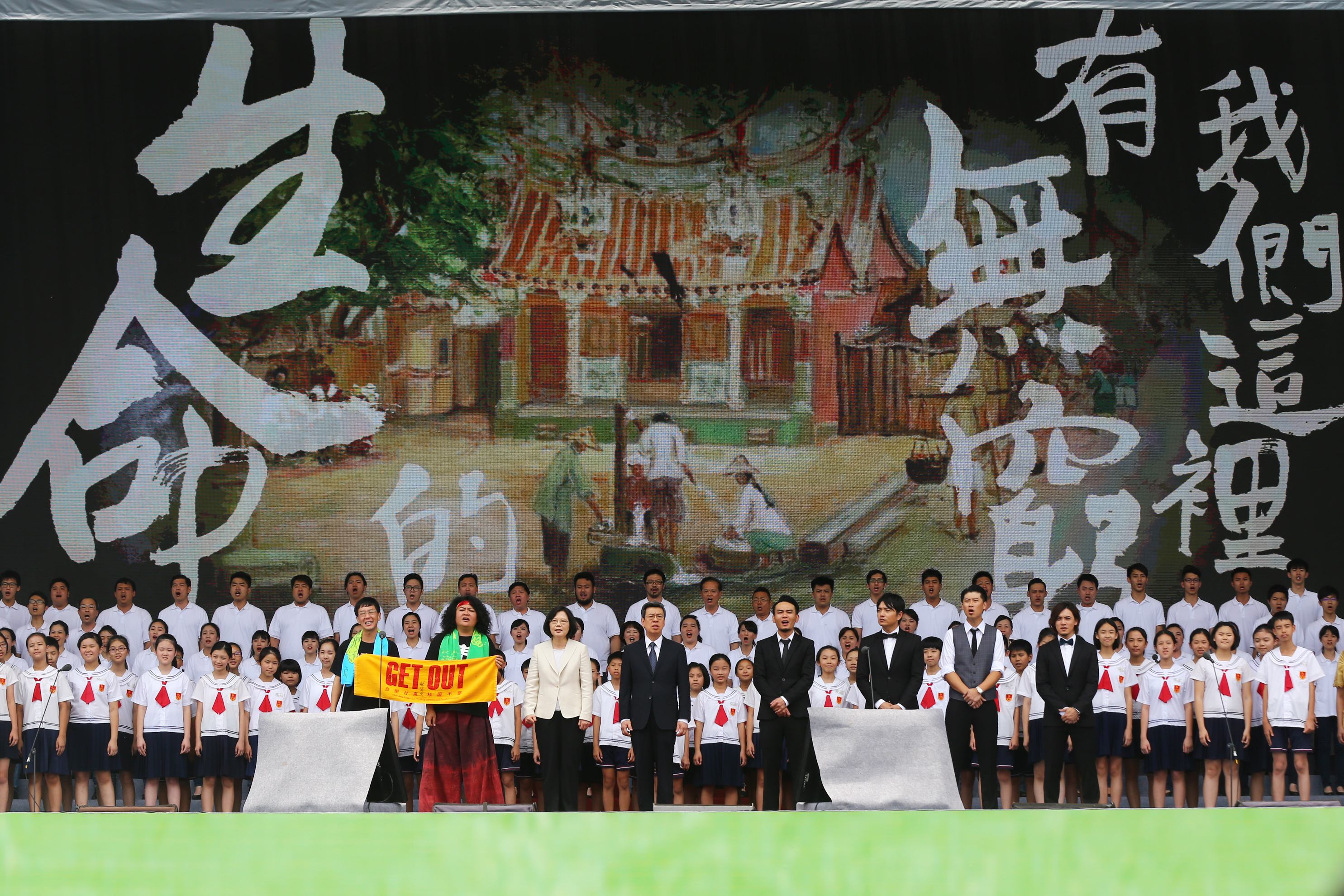
Lin Sheng Xiang performs at the 2016 Presidential and Vice Presidential Inauguration Ceremonies

Lin Sheng Xiang graduated from Tainan No. 2 High School and Tamkang University. During his college years, he founded the Kuan Tsu Music Pit (Mandarin: 觀子音樂坑) and served as guitarist and vocalist.

After returning to Meinong, Kuan Tsu Music Pit reformed into "Labor Exchange Band" (Mandarin: 交工樂隊), playing guitar, Yueqin, sanxian, and vocals, and after Labor Exchange Band disbanded, Sheng Xiang and Wajao Pit 3 (Mandarin: 生祥與瓦窯坑3) formed for the release of the album "Getting Dark" (Mandarin: 臨暗), playing guitar and vocals. After that, he played guitar, Yueqin and vocals for "Sheng Xiang & Band" (Mandarin: 生祥樂隊) with an indefinite number of members.

After Labor Exchange Band disbanded in 2003, Lin Sheng Xiang continued to collaborate with Chung Yung Feng (Mandarin: 鍾永豐) on lyrics, and since the album "Planting Trees" (Mandarin: 種樹), he has been working with Japanese guitarist Ken Ohtake (Mandarin: 大竹研) on his music.

Bassist Toru Hayakawa (Mandarin: 早川徹) joined the band in the spring of 2010 on Ken Ohtake's recommendation, and they have been working together since the album "The Land Is My Study" (Mandarin: 大地書房), and in the summer of 2011, percussionist Alex Wu (Mandarin: 吳政君) joined the band before they went to Japan to perform at the Fuji Rock Festival, and in July 2012, the band changed its name because their friends made a stroke of their name and thought that it would be good luck for the band to be named "Sheng Xiang & Band" (Mandarin: 生祥樂隊).

In 2012, the band commissioned luthier Liu Zhi-Wei to make a six-stringed Yueqin, Kanaji Kawabaka (Mandarin: 川畑完之) to make an electric moon organ, and customized a unique moon organ.

In 2015, he recorded the anti-air pollution concept double album "Village Besieged" (Mandarin: 圍庄), including the second part "Village Besieged" and the third part "Moving On" (Mandarin: 動身) of the "I-Village Trilogy" (Mandarin: 我庄), with musicians Ken Ohtake, Toru Hayakawa, Noriaki Fukushima (Mandarin: 福島紀明), Alex Wu and Huang Po Yu (Mandarin: 黃博裕). The "Village Besieged" concept double album sought to raise funds on online platforms in 2016 as it did not receive record label investment. The Village Besieged double album was released on May 21, 2016, and has been on campus tour since of October 2016, eventually winning the Golden Melody Award Jury Prize.

In 2017 Lin Sheng Xiang and Wang Zhao-hua (Mandarin: 王昭華) collaborated to produce the movie soundtrack of "The Great Buddha+" (Mandarin: 大佛普拉斯), which won the Golden Horse Award for Best Original Film Song and the Golden Melody Award for Best Single Producer.

== Musical works ==
=== Kuan tsu music pit period ===
- Chatting in the Village (June 1998, Lin Sheng Xiang, Chung Shing Tat, Chung Shing Fu, Chan Kwun Yu)
- Touring Beautiful Island – Kuan Tsu Music Pit 98' Come and See the Land Tour (August 1998, Lin Sheng Xiang, Zhong Cheng-Da, Zhong Cheng-Hu, Guanyu Chen)

=== Labor exchange band period ===
- Let Us Sing Mountain Songs (1999)
- The Night March of the Chrysanthemums (2001)

=== Shengxiang and the wakao pit 3 period ===
- Getting Dark (2004, Lin Sheng Xiang, Chung Yufeng, Rio Lu, Peng Jia Xi)

=== Sheng xiang and band period (生祥與樂團) ===
- Planting Trees (2006, Lin Sheng Xiang, Takashi Hirayasu, Ken Ohtake)
- Growing Up Wild (2009, Lin Sheng Xiang, Ken Ohtake)
- The Land Is My Study (2010, Lin Sheng Xiang, Ken Ohtake, Toru Hayakawa)

=== Sheng xiang and band period (生祥樂隊) ===
- I-Village (published May 2013, Lin Sheng Xiang, Ken Ohtake, Toru Hayakawa, Alex Wu)
- Village Besieged (published May 2016, Lin Sheng Xiang, Ken Ohtake, Toru Hayakawa, Alex Wu, Noriaki Fukushima, Huang Po Yu)
- Village Besieged Live in Concert
- Water Snowflake Goes to Market (Release Concert November 28 & 29, 2020)
- The Night March of the Chrysanthemums 15th Anniversary Concert Live Recording Highlights
- Kafka on the Rivers-and-Lakes (October 8 & 9, 2022)
- I-Village Trilogy Concerts Selected Live Recordings (Recorded National Concert Hall Selections April 16, 2021)

== Awards ==
Year	Issue	Album	Awards	Finalists	Result
2000	The 11th Golden Melody Awards	Let Us Sing Mountain Songs	Best Composer	Lin Sheng Xiang-Let Us Sing Mountain Songs	Won
2000	The 11th Golden Melody Awards	Let Us Sing Mountain Songs	Best Lyricist Award	Chung Yung Feng-Let Us Sing Mountain Songs	Nominated
2000	The 11th Golden Melody Awards	Let Us Sing Mountain Songs	Best Album Producer	Chung Yung Feng, Lin Sheng Xiang, Guanyu Chen-Let Us Sing Mountain Songs	Won
2000	The 11th Golden Melody Awards	Let Us Sing Mountain Songs	Best Ethnic Music Album [Non-Pop Music] Award	Let Us Sing Mountain Songs	Nominated
2002	The 13th Golden Melody Awards	The Night March of the Chrysanthemums	Best Band	Labor Exchange Band-The Night March of the Chrysanthemums	Won
2005	The 16th Golden Melody Awards	Getting Dark	Best Hakka Album	Getting Dark	Won
2005	The 16th Golden Melody Awards	Getting Dark	Best Composer	Lin Sheng Xiang-Getting Dark	Nominated
2005	The 16th Golden Melody Awards	Getting Dark	Best Lyricist Award	Chung Yung Feng-Getting Dark	Won
2005	The 16th Golden Melody Awards	Getting Dark	Best Lyricist Award	Chung Yung Feng, Lin Sheng Xiang	Nominated
2005	The 16th Golden Melody Awards	Getting Dark	Best Arranger	Lin Sheng Xiang, Peng Jia Xi、Rio Lu, Chung Yufeng	Nominated
2005	The 16th Golden Melody Awards	Getting Dark	Best Album Producer	Lin Sheng Xiang, Chung Yung Feng, Chung Shefong-Getting Dark	Nominated
2005	The 16th Golden Melody Awards	Getting Dark	Best Band	Shengxiang and the Wakao Pit 3-Getting Dark	Won
2007	The 18th Golden Melody Awards	Planting Trees	Best Hakka Album	Planting Trees	Won
2007	The 18th Golden Melody Awards	Planting Trees	Best Hakka Singer	Planting Trees	Won
2007	The 18th Golden Melody Awards	Planting Trees	Best Song of the Year	Planting Trees	Nominated
2007	The 18th Golden Melody Awards	Planting Trees	Best Composer	Planting Trees	Nominated
2007	The 18th Golden Melody Awards	Planting Trees	Best Lyricist Award	Chung Yung Feng-Planting Trees	Won
2007	The 18th Golden Melody Awards	Planting Trees	Best Album Producer	Lin Sheng Xiang, Chung Yung Feng, Chung Shefong-Planting Trees	Nominated
2010	The 21st Golden Melody Awards	Growing Up Wild	Best Album Package	Luo Wenzen, Wang Liang-Growing Up Wild	Nominated
2010	The 1st Golden Indie Music Awards	Growing Up Wild	Best Singer-Songwriter Award	Growing Up Wild	Nominated
2010	The 1st Golden Indie Music Awards	Growing Up Wild	Best Folk Album	Growing Up Wild	Won
2010	The 1st Golden Indie Music Awards	Growing Up Wild	Best Musician	Lin Sheng Xiang/Yueqin, Guitar	Nominated
2010	The 1st Golden Indie Music Awards	Growing Up Wild	Best Folk Single	South	Nominated
2011	The 2nd Golden Indie Music Awards	The Land Is My Study	Best Album	The Land Is My Study	Won
2011	The 2nd Golden Indie Music Awards	The Land Is My Study	Best Artist	The Land Is My Study	Won
2011	The 2nd Golden Indie Music Awards	The Land Is My Study	Best Folk Album	The Land Is My Study	Won
2011	The 2nd Golden Indie Music Awards	The Land Is My Study	Best Musician	Lin Sheng Xiang/Guitar	Nominated
2011	The 22nd Golden Melody Awards	The Land Is My Study	Best Album Package	Luo Wenzen-The Land Is My Study	Nominated
2013	The 4th Golden Indie Music Awards	I-Village	Best Album	I-Village	Won
2013	The 4th Golden Indie Music Awards	I-Village	Best Artist	I-Village	Nominated
2013	The 4th Golden Indie Music Awards	I-Village	Best Rock Album	I-Village	Nominated
2013	The 4th Golden Indie Music Awards	I-Village	Jury Award	I-Village	Won
2013	The 4th Golden Indie Music Awards	I-Village	Best Musician	Lin Sheng Xiang/Yueqin	Won
2013	The 4th Golden Indie Music Awards	I-Village	Best Rock Single	Grass	Nominated
2014	The 25th Golden Melody Awards	I-Village	Best Lyricist Award	Chung Yung Feng-I-Village	Nominated
2014	The 25th Golden Melody Awards	I-Village	Best Album Package	Luo Wenzen-I-Village	Nominated
2016	The 7th Golden Indie Music Awards	Village Besieged	Best Album	Village Besieged	Won
2016	The 7th Golden Indie Music Awards	Village Besieged	Best Singer-Songwriter	Village Besieged	Nominated
2016	The 7th Golden Indie Music Awards	Village Besieged	Best Rock Album	Village Besieged	Nominated
2016	The 7th Golden Indie Music Awards	Village Besieged	Jury Award	Village Besieged	Won
2016	The 7th Golden Indie Music Awards	Village Besieged	Best Musician	Ken Ohtake/Guitar	Nominated
2016	The 7th Golden Indie Music Awards	Village Besieged	Best Rock Single	Calling for Guidance from the Guardian of Good Healt	Nominated
2016	The 7th Golden Indie Music Awards	Village Besieged	Best Folk Single	The South Wind	Won
2017	The 28th Golden Melody Awards	Village Besieged	Album of the Year	Village Besieged	Nominated
2017	The 28th Golden Melody Awards	Village Besieged	Jury Prize	Village Besieged	Won
2017	The 28th Golden Melody Awards	Village Besieged	Best Album Binding Design	Luo Wenzen-Village Besieged	Nominated
2018	The 29th Golden Melody Awards	The Great Buddha+ movie soundtrack	Song of the Year	To Have, or Not To Have	Nominated
2018	The 29th Golden Melody Awards	The Great Buddha+ movie soundtrack	Best Lyricist Award	To Have, or Not To Have	Nominated
2018	The 29th Golden Melody Awards	The Great Buddha+ movie soundtrack	Best Single Producer	To Have, or Not To Have	Won
2020	The 31st Golden Melody Awards	A Sun's movie soundtrack	Song of the Year	Distant Journey	Nominated
2020	The 31st Golden Melody Awards	A Sun's movie soundtrack	Best Composer	Distant Journey	Nominated
2021	The 32nd Golden Melody Awards	Water Snowflake Goes to Market	Best Band	Sheng Xiang & Band-Water Snowflake Goes to Market	Nominated
2021	The 32nd Golden Melody Awards	Water Snowflake Goes to Market	Best Album Binding Design	Luo Wenzen-Water Snowflake Goes to Market	Nominated
2021	The 12th Golden Indie Music Awards	Water Snowflake Goes to Market	Best Folk Album	Water Snowflake Goes to Market	Nominated
2021	The 12th Golden Indie Music Awards	Water Snowflake Goes to Market	Best Folk Single	The Tofu Guy	Nominated
2023	The 34th Golden Melody Awards	Kafka on the Rivers-and-Lakes	Best Band	Sheng Xiang & Band-Chung Yung Feng	Nominated
2023	The 34th Golden Melody Awards	Kafka on the Rivers-and-Lakes	Best Album Binding Design	Chia-Lin Wu-Kafka on the Rivers-and-Lakes	Nominated

Other awards

- In 2014, he was shortlisted for the Best Folk Artist of the Year, Best Other Dialect Album of the Year ("I-Village"), and Best Hakka Song of the Year (Yanshu/"I-Village") at the Chinese Golden Melody Awards.
- In August 2017, he won Best Band (Lin Sheng Xiang "Village Besieged") and Best Album Design (Luo Wenzen "Village Besieged") at the 17th Chinese Music Media Music Awards Open Awards with the double CD Village Besieged.

=== Civic engagement ===
On August 14, 2013, Lin Sheng Xiang, film director Ko I-chen, screenwriter Neil Peng, environmental lawyer Robin Winkler, writer Nan Fang Shuo, and retired professor emeritus of National Tsing Hua University Ming-Fui-Pang (Mandarin: 彭明輝) launched the "Constitution 133 Practice Alliance" to promote the recall of legislators who are "following Ma and violating public opinion, to show that democracy is not only about elections held once every four years, and recall is not only an empty word written in Article 17 and Article 133 of the Constitution. The Alliance issued a "Statement on Citizen's Recall Campaign", but because the threshold for recalling the president is too high, it will mobilize to recall Ma's legislators from each constituency.

== Anecdotes ==
- In 2007, Lin Shengxiang was awarded the Best Hakka Album and Singer at the Golden Melody Awards.In 2007, Lin Sheng Xiang won the Golden Melody Awards for Best Hakka Album and Singer. However, he refused to accept the two awards based on language, arguing that music awards should be categorized by genre, not by language. This was the first time since the Golden Melody Awards that someone refused to accept the awards, and caused a public debate. The prize money was donated to a Meinong voluntary tree planting team, Meinong's community newspaper, an organic farming magazine, and Yang Rumen (Mandarin: 楊儒門), a rice bomber who advocates for domestic agriculture in Taiwan[28] After 2010, Lin Sheng Xiang no longer applied for the language category of the Golden Melody Awards, and in 2017, the Golden Melody Awards set up a language-neutral Album of the Year award in an attempt to transcend the language barrier.
