= Independence Evening Post =

Chinese-language newspaper in Taiwan (1947–2001)

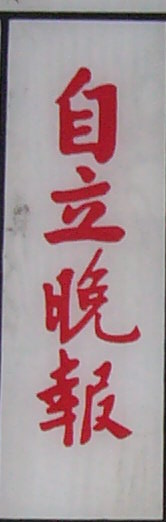
- Type: Evening newspaper
- Launched: 10 October 1947
- Ceased publication: 2 October 2001
- Political alignment: Tangwai (1947–1980s); Pan-Blue (mid-1994–2000); Pan-Green (early 1990s; 2000s)
- Website: idn.com.tw

The Independence Evening Post (Chinese: 自立晚報) was a Chinese-language newspaper founded by Wu San-lien, which was published in Taiwan from 1947 to 2001. For most of its existence, the publication was supportive of the tangwai movement and Democratic Progressive Party.

== History ==
The paper was founded by Wu San-lien in 1947. Its first issue was published on 10 October 1947. The paper backed the tangwai movement, maintaining a pro-independence stance for most of its history, and was known for its honest coverage of the Zhongli incident. Shortly after martial law was lifted in 1987, the Independence Evening Post accomplished another milestone, becoming the first Taiwanese newspaper to send reporters to China. Upon their return, the journalists, Hsu Lu and Lee Yung-te, were subject to travel restrictions for a year. The government permitted the Post to publish a morning edition in 1988, which lasted until 1999. In mid-1994, Taipei City Councillor Chen Cheng-chung acquired the publication after it began losing money, and shifted its editorial focus to support of the Pan-Blue Coalition. The Hsiang Shan Group invested in the Post in 1999. Because the company failed to secure a controlling interest, the Hsiang Shan Group established a competitor, Power News. When Wang Shih-chien bought the Post in October 2000, its editorial line swung again toward the Democratic Progressive Party. Wang named Chen Hsiu-li his successor as president of the paper in March 2001, despite opposition from the editorial staff. Wang then transferred control of the newspaper to Chang Fu-tai in July, with Liu Yi-te as president. Chang later claimed that the transition to his leadership was never valid. The Post published its last print issue on 2 October 2001, nearly insolvent. A Chinese-language website is still active. Competing publication Power News folded in February 2002.

== See also ==
- List of newspapers in Taiwan
