= Bopomofo (Unicode block) =

- Range: U+3100..U+312F (48 code points)
- Plane: BMP
- Scripts: Bopomofo
- Major alphabets: Phonetic Chinese
- Assigned: 43 code points
- Unused: 5 reserved code points
- Source standards: GB 2312

Unicode version history
- 1.0.0 (1991): 40 (+40)
- 5.1 (2008): 41 (+1)
- 10.0 (2017): 42 (+1)
- 11.0 (2018): 43 (+1)

Unicode documentation
- Code chart ∣ Web page

Bopomofo is a Unicode block containing phonetic characters for Chinese. The original set of 40 Bopomofo characters is based on the Chinese standard GB 2312. Additional Bopomofo characters can be found in the Bopomofo Extended block.

== Block ==
Bopomofo^{[1]}^{[2]} Official Unicode Consortium code chart (PDF)
	0	1	2	3	4	5	6	7	8	9	A	B	C	D	E	F
U+310x						ㄅ	ㄆ	ㄇ	ㄈ	ㄉ	ㄊ	ㄋ	ㄌ	ㄍ	ㄎ	ㄏ
U+311x	ㄐ	ㄑ	ㄒ	ㄓ	ㄔ	ㄕ	ㄖ	ㄗ	ㄘ	ㄙ	ㄚ	ㄛ	ㄜ	ㄝ	ㄞ	ㄟ
U+312x	ㄠ	ㄡ	ㄢ	ㄣ	ㄤ	ㄥ	ㄦ	ㄧ	ㄨ	ㄩ	ㄪ	ㄫ	ㄬ	ㄭ	ㄮ	ㄯ
Notes: 1. As of Unicode version 16.0; 2. Grey areas indicate non-assigned code points

== History ==
The following Unicode-related documents record the purpose and process of defining specific characters in the Bopomofo block:

Version	Final code points (Note: Proposed code points and characters names may differ from final code points and names)	Count	L2 ID	WG2 ID	Document
1.0.0	U+3105..312C	40			(to be determined)
1.0.0	U+3105..312C	40	L2/14-189		Lunde, Ken (2014-08-01), BOPOMOFO LETTER I
1.0.0	U+3105..312C	40		N4609	Reply to your company's inquiry to usage of Bopomofo Letter I, 2014-08-20
1.0.0	U+3105..312C	40	L2/14-177		Moore, Lisa (2014-10-17), "Bopomofo Letter I (B.15.1)", UTC #140 Minutes
1.0.0	U+3105..312C	40	L2/16-052	N4603 (pdf, doc)	Umamaheswaran, V. S. (2015-09-01), "M63.11u", Unconfirmed minutes of WG 2 meeting 63, "Rotate the glyph for 3127 BOPOMOFO LETTER I by 90 degrees, with an appropriate change in the annotation, per request in document N4609"
5.1	U+312D	1	L2/06-338	N3179	Everson, Michael; Ho, H. W.; West, Andrew (2006-10-19), Proposal to encode one Bopomofo character in the UCS
5.1	U+312D	1	L2/06-324R2		Moore, Lisa (2006-11-29), "Consensus 109-C24", UTC #109 Minutes
5.1	U+312D	1	L2/07-215	N3246	Proposal to encode two Bopomofo characters in UCS, 2007-04-20
5.1	U+312D	1	L2/07-268	N3253 (pdf, doc)	Umamaheswaran, V. S. (2007-07-26), "M50.19", Unconfirmed minutes of WG 2 meeting 50, Frankfurt-am-Main, Germany; 2007-04-24/27
10.0	U+312E	1	L2/15-284	N4695	West, Andrew; Liang, Hai (2015-10-22), Discussion of 2CEF1
10.0	U+312E	1	L2/15-254		Moore, Lisa (2015-11-16), "Consensus 145-C20", UTC #145 Minutes, "Approve U+312E BOPOMOFO LETTER O WITH DOT ABOVE for encoding in a future version of the standard. See document L2/15-270."
10.0	U+312E	1		N4739	"M64.05e", Unconfirmed minutes of WG 2 meeting 64, 2016-08-31
11.0	U+312F	1	L2/16-106	N4717	West, Andrew (2016-04-21), Proposal to encode one Bopomofo letter
11.0	U+312F	1	L2/16-121		Moore, Lisa (2016-05-20), "C.16", UTC #147 Minutes
11.0	U+312F	1		N4756	TCA Feedback on JTC1/SC2/WG2 N4717, 2016-09-22
11.0	U+312F	1		N4873R (pdf, doc)	"7.2.1 T1", Unconfirmed minutes of WG 2 meeting 65, 2018-03-16

== See also ==
- Spacing Modifier Letters (Unicode block) has two Bopomofo characters: U+02EA–U+02EB
