= Mandarin Daily News =

Mandarin language children's newspaper in Taiwan in traditional characters

- Type: Daily newspaper
- Format: Broadsheet
- Owner: Mandarin Daily News
- Founded: 25 October 1948 (77 years ago)
- Headquarters: Zhongzheng, Taipei, Taiwan
- Website: mdnkids.com

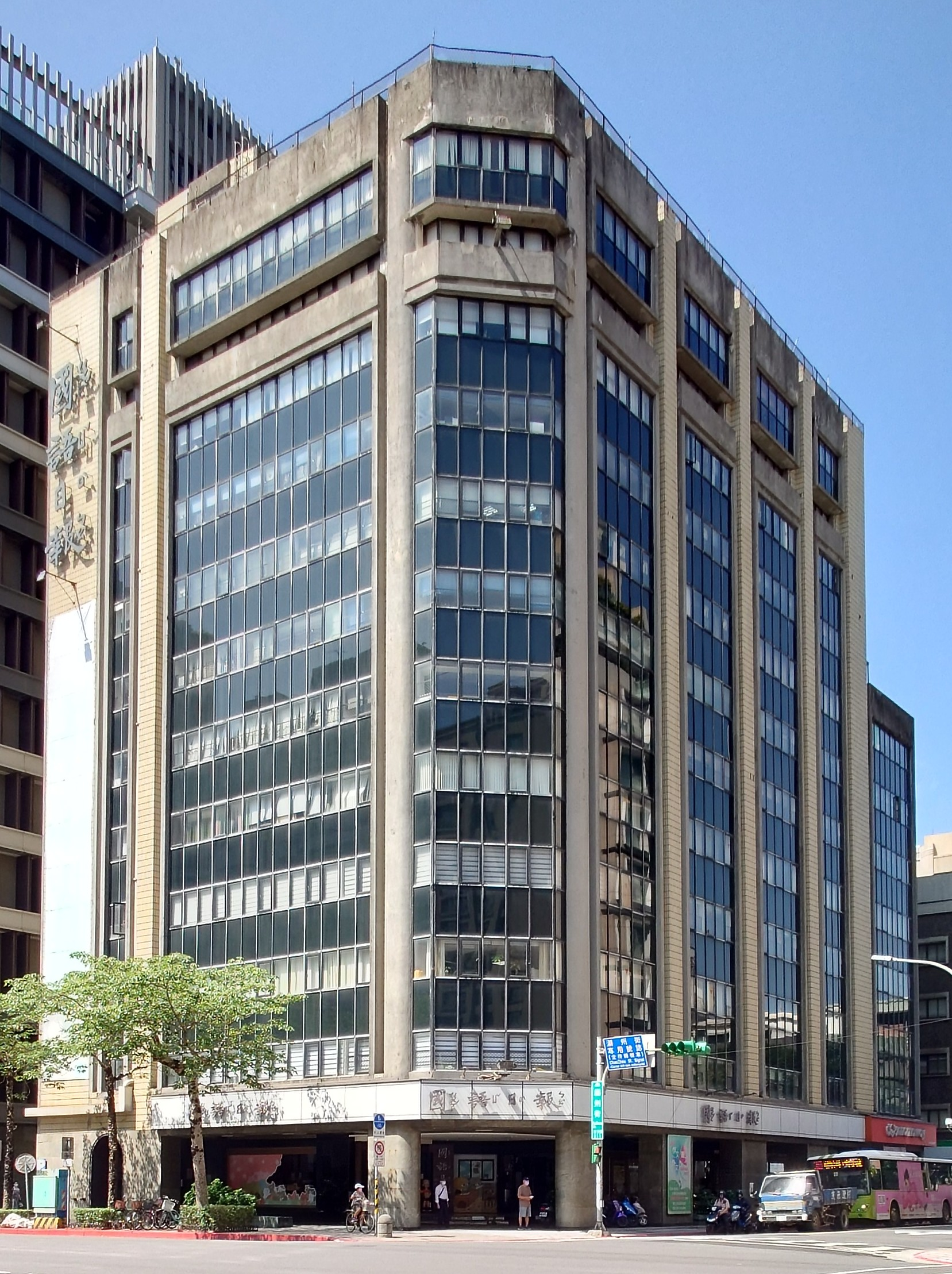
Mandarin Daily News Building on Roosevelt Road in Taipei

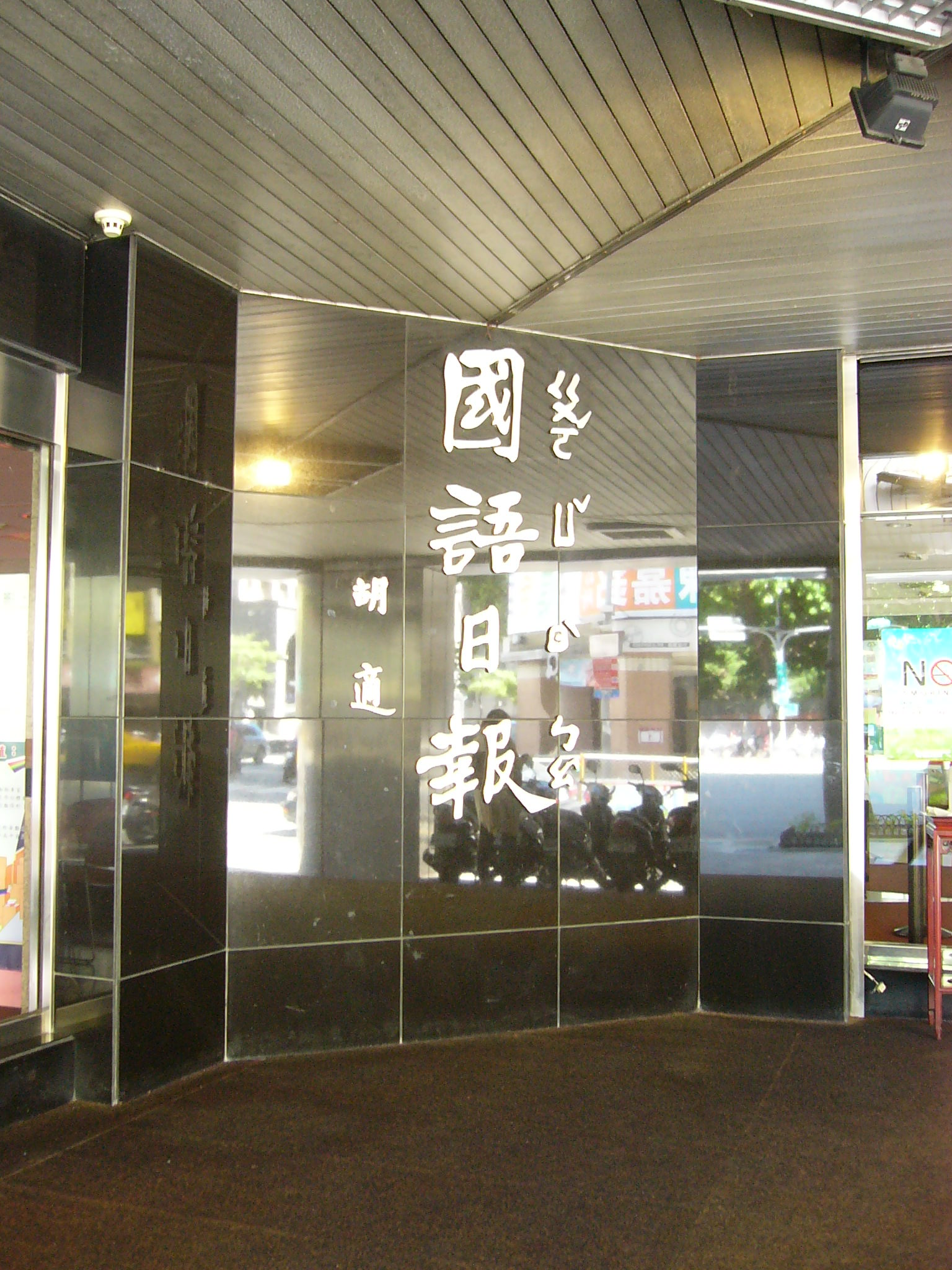
Mandarin Daily News script by Hu Shih

The Mandarin Daily News (Chinese: 國語日報; pinyin: Guóyǔ Rìbào; Wade–Giles: Kuo^{2}-yü^{3} Jih^{4}-pao^{4}; Pe̍h-ōe-jī: Kok-gú-ji̍t-pò; Gwoyeu Romatzyh: Gwoyeu Ryhbaw; Zhuyin: ㄍㄨㄛˊ ㄩˇ ㄖˋ ㄅㄠˋ) is a traditional Chinese children's newspaper published daily in Taiwan. The main text of the articles is accompanied by Zhuyin (Bopomofo) phonetic script to aid identification of difficult characters. The project was founded on 25 October 1948. In 1949, led by Wu Zhihui, a promoter of the Mandarin movement in Taiwan, along with Chen Songping, Hu Shi, Fu Sinian, and other members of the Mandarin Promotion Committee of the Ministry of Education, Taiwan invited Taiwanese provincial figures such as Huang Chunqing, Du Congming, and Li Wanju to establish a board of directors in March 1949 to strengthen the operation of the newspaper. Mandarin Daily News is not profit oriented, so in terms of business operation, it takes service as the premise and education as the call. In February of the forty ninth year, it was established as the "Mandarin Daily News Agency", with all its operating income used to expand its own business, promote Mandarin education, and serve readers and society.

== See also ==
- Mandarin Daily News Language Center
- List of newspapers in Taiwan
