= Chinese Christian Tribune =

Chinese Christian Tribune 基督教論壇報
- Owner: Chinese Christian Tribune Foundation
- Founder: World Council of Churches
- Publisher: Chinese Christian Tribune Foundation
- Founded: 1965-10-31
- Language: Traditional Chinese
- Headquarters: Republic of China (Taiwan)
- Price: New Taiwan Dollar

The Chinese Christian Tribune (Chinese: 基督教論壇報) is a leading Christian newspaper published in Taiwan. It was founded on October 31, 1965, by the World Council of Churches to commemorate the 100th anniversary of missionary work in Taiwan. The newspaper is known as the only independent, inter-denominational Christian media in China.

The "Impact Asia Center" under the Chinese Christian Tribune Foundation, also called the "Asia Influence Center", is an international platform dedicated to advancing Christian faith and social impact in Asia and the world. It helped Christian Tribune to transform from a print newspaper into a multidimensional media.

== History ==
October 31, 1965: the Chinese Christian Tribune was founded as a weekly newspaper by the Committee on Letters and Literature of the World Council of Churches to commemorate the centennial of missions in Taiwan. The Presbyterian Church, the Methodist Church, the Anglican Church, and the Lutheran Church in Taiwan were invited to participate in the management.

1981: The board of directors was reorganized. Jian Hongji, General Manager of Bristol-Myers Squibb Taiwan, took over as president.

1985: The Chinese Christian Tribune Foundation was established on the 7th floor of No. 22, Songjiang Road, Taipei City.

1989: The first meeting of the newly appointed editorial board was held. It was decided that the newspaper should report on the activities and ministries of churches across Taiwan.

2000: The newspaper changed to a tri-daily edition (published every Tuesday and Friday)

2003: Changed to a bi-daily edition (published every Tuesday, Thursday, and Saturday).

August 1, 2009: Entered the digital era, and the "Tribune e-Newspaper" was launched, with daily content updates; the physical newspaper was changed to a three-day newspaper, and a weekend edition was added.

2010: The board of directors was re-elected, Zheng Zhongxin took over as president. The newspaper was changed to Wednesday and Saturday publication, and weekend feature reports were strengthened, presented in the form of a "news magazine"

2011: A Digital Department was established to oversee the development and operation of the website, social media, and app. In October, the Facebook and Weibo accounts began operating, and the website underwent a complete redesign.

2013: The mobile website and the "Tribune iReading" cloud bookstore app were launched.

2015: The official Line Life Circle account was launched. The Christian Tribune News app was completed and launched on the App Store and Google Play. Global search and traditional-simplified Chinese conversion features were developed to serve Chinese readers worldwide.

2020: The Tribune held the 55th anniversary thanksgiving dinner, where CEO Cheng Chung-sin officially announced the launch of the "Impact Asia Center", an important platform under the Christian Tribune Foundation.

== Current situation ==
Chinese Christian Tribune is now a leading Christian newspaper with a global readership. It follows the principles of faith, hope and love, and is firmly committed to delivering fresh, objective, insightful, balanced, concise information. The purpose is to spread the Gospel of Christ's salvation. The tribune is the only cross-denominational, independently operated Christian media among Chinese people.

Christian Tribune currently publishes a print edition twice a week, 6,000 copies per issue. In addition, there are many news articles available online, which are more frequently updated.

The managing unit of the Chinese Christian Tribune is the Chinese Christian Tribune Foundation. The current office is located at 8F-3, No. 50, Section 1, Xinsheng South Road, Taipei City. Chinese Christian Tribune has partnered with the Presbyterian Church in Taiwan, the Methodist Church in China, the Anglican Church in Taiwan and the Lutheran Church in Taiwan.

== Impact Asia Center ==
The "Impact Asia Center" (亞洲論壇影響力中心), or "Asia Influence Center", is an international platform dedicated to advancing Christian faith and social impact in Asia and the world. It connects church leaders, professionals, and believers by holding forums, annual conferences (Impact Asia Summit, 亞洲論壇影響力國際年會), and international collaborations. The headquarters is located at a Japanese-style building acquired during the COVID-19 pandemic.

The Impact Asia Center has successfully held the 1st Impact Asia Summit (in Kuala Lumpur, Malaysia, 2022), 2nd Impact Asia Summit (in Jakarta, Indonesia, 2023), 3rd Impact Asia Summit (in Kaohsiung, Taiwan, 2024) and the 4th Impact Asia Summit (in Tokyo, Japan, 2025).

== See also ==
- World Council of Churches
- List of newspapers in Taiwan
