= Taiwan Times =

Newspaper in Taiwan

- Type: Daily newspaper
- Format: Broadsheet
- Publisher: Taiwan Times Newspaper Corporation
- Founded: 25 August 1971 (55 years ago)
- Headquarters: Renwu District, Kaohsiung City, Taiwan
- Website: www.taiwantimes.com.tw

Taiwan Times
- Traditional Chinese: 臺灣時報
- Simplified Chinese: 台湾时报
Transcriptions
Standard Mandarin
- Hanyu Pinyin: Táiwān Shíbào
Southern Min
- Hokkien POJ: Tâi-ôan-sî-pò

The Taiwan Times (Chinese: 臺灣時報; pinyin: Táiwān Shíbào; Wade–Giles: T’ai²-wan¹ Shih²-pao⁴) is a newspaper based in Taiwan. The newspaper began publishing on 25 August 1971. Wang Hsing-ching worked as one of its notable reporters.

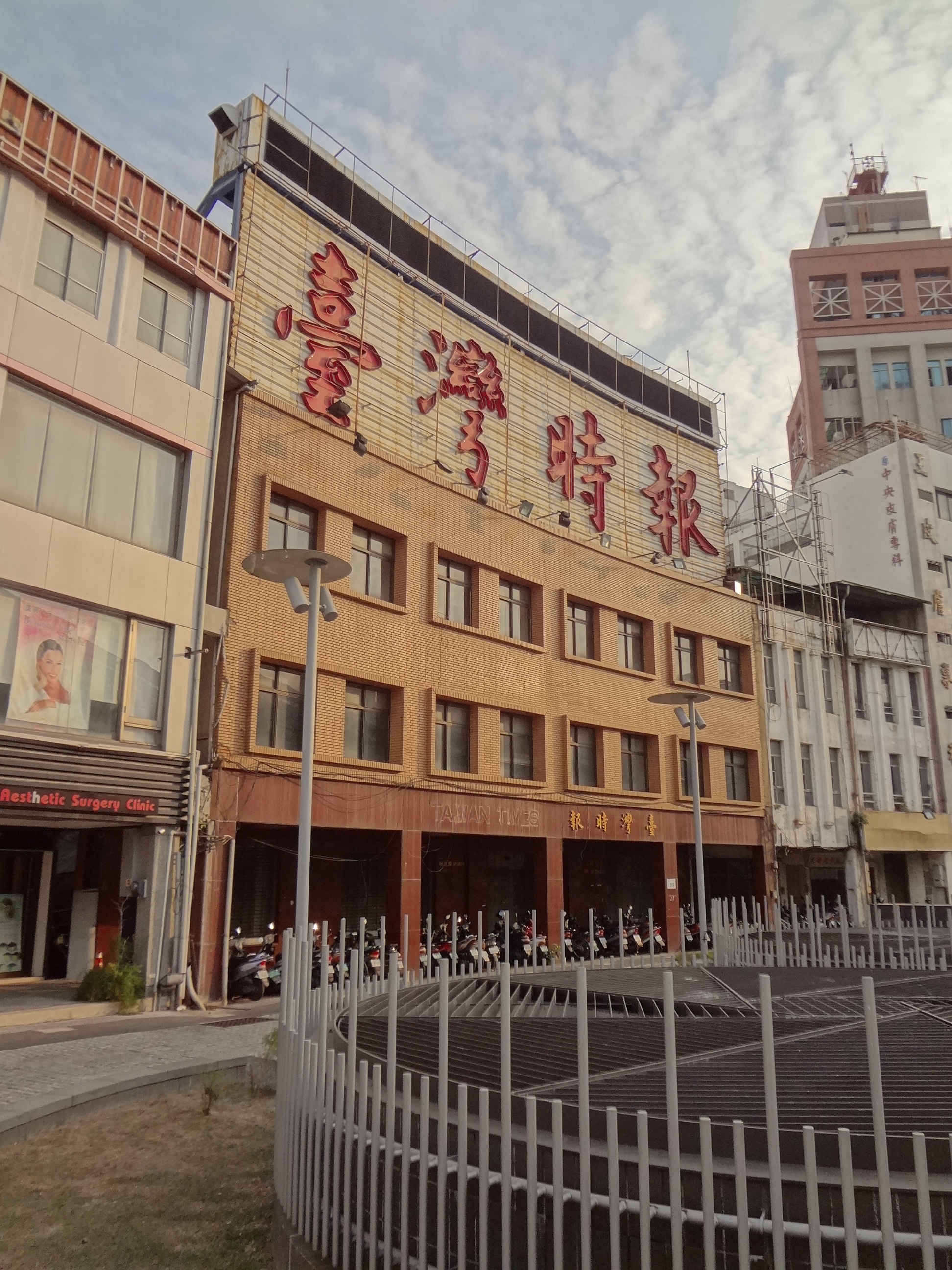
Former headquarters of Taiwan Times

== See also ==
- List of newspapers in Taiwan
