= Mandarin Daily News Language Center =

Taipei Chinese-language school for native English speakers

The Mandarin Daily News Language Center is a Chinese language school for native English speakers in Taipei, Taiwan.

The school is sponsored by the Mandarin Daily News, a major Taiwanese newspaper. The school is non-accredited, but foreign students at either school are eligible for student visa extensions.
