= Cantonese bopomofo =

Semisyllabary used for transcribing Cantonese and Yue Chinese

Cantonese Bopomofo; 粵語注音符號; 粤语注音符号; ㄩㄊㄩ ㄐㄩㄧㆿㄇ ㄈㄨㄏㄛㄨ
- Script type: Semisyllabary
- Period: 1931 to 1958 in Mainland China; TBA (de jure)

Related scripts
- Parent systems: Oracle bone script: Seal script; Clerical script; Bopomofo; Cantonese Bopomofo; 粵語注音符號; 粤语注音符号; ㄩㄊㄩ ㄐㄩㄧㆿㄇ ㄈㄨㄏㄛㄨ
- Sister systems: Taiwanese Phonetic Symbols, Suzhou Phonetic Symbols, Hmu Phonetic Symbols

Unicode
- Unicode range: U+3100–U+312F Bopomofo; U+31A0–U+31BF Bopomofo Extended

Cantonese Bopomofo, or Cantonese Phonetic Symbols (traditional Chinese: 粵語注音符號; simplified Chinese: 粤语注音符号; Jyutping: jyut6 jyu5 zyu3 jam1 fu4 hou6; Cantonese Yale: Yuht-yúh jyu-yām fùh-houh) is an extended set of Bopomofo characters used to transcribe Yue Chinese and, specifically, its prestige Cantonese dialect. It was first introduced in early 1930s, and then standardized in 1950. It fell into disuse along with the original Bopomofo for Mandarin Chinese in the late 1950s but de jure used in Hong Kong and Macau.

== History ==
The first system of phonetic characters for Cantonese was introduced in "Phonetic vocabulary of Cantonese characters for instruction of literacy to the people", 1931, by Ziu Ngaating. His system became a basis for the modern one, accepted in 1950 by the Guangdong Culture and Education department. In 1932, however, a different system was published in a draft by the Commission on the Unification of Pronunciation with supplementary symbols for non-Mandarin Sinitic languages, including Cantonese.

== Symbols ==
Bopomofo for Cantonese contains additional characters to denote its specific sounds.

Initial consonants					Semi-vowels	Vowels				Final consonants	
ㄅ [p]	ㄉ [t]	ㄍ [k]	ㄐ [t͡s]	ㆼ [kʷ]	ㄧ [iː], [j-]	ㄚ [aː]	ㄞ [aːi]	ㄢ [aːn]	ㄇ [m̩]	ㄇ [-m]	ㄆ [-p̚]
ㄆ [pʰ]	ㄊ [tʰ]	ㄎ [kʰ]	ㄑ [t͡sʰ]	ㆽ [kʷʰ]	ㄨ [uː], [w-]	ㄛ [ɔː]	ㄟ [ɐi]	ㄣ [ɐn]	ㄫ [ŋ̍]	ㄋ [-n]	ㄊ [-t̚]
ㄇ [m]	ㄋ [n]	ㄫ [ŋ]			ㄩ [y], [jy-]	ㄝ [ɛː]	ㄠ [aːu]	ㄤ [aːŋ]		ㄫ [-ŋ]	ㄎ [-k̚]
ㄈ [f]	ㄌ [l]	ㄏ [h]	ㄒ [s]			ㆿ [ɐ]	ㄡ [ɐu]	ㄥ [ɐŋ]			
						ㆾ [œː]					

=== Combined rhymes ===
The original Bopomofo was based on a two vowel model of Mandarin phonology, it contains two sets of vowel signs, one for the /a/-nucleus and another one for the /ə/ nucleus. These characters were inherited, with /a/ set used to denote long /aː/ of Cantonese, and /ə/ set for short /ɐ/. For the rhymes not found in Mandarin, Cantonese Bopomofo implements digraphs composed of a vowel character and a final consonants character. The monographs are highlighted in bold in the following table .

	aː	a	i	o	u	œ	ü	e
∅	**ㄚ** aː	**ㆿ** ɐ^{1}	**ㄧ** iː	**ㄛ** ɔː	**ㄨ** uː	**ㆾ** œː	**ㄩ** yː	**ㄝ** ɛː
-n	**ㄢ** aːn	**ㄣ** ɐn	ㄧㄋ iːn	ㄛㄋ ɔːn	ㄨㄋ uːn	ㆾㄋ ɵn	ㄩㄋ yːn	ㄝㄋ ɛːn^{2}
-t	ㄚㄊ aːt̚	ㆿㄊ ɐt̚	ㄧㄊ iːt̚	ㄛㄊ ɔːt̚	ㄨㄊ uːt̚	ㆾㄊ ɵt̚	ㄩㄊ yːt̚	ㄝㄊ ɛːt̚^{2}
-i	**ㄞ** aːi	**ㄟ** ɐi		ㄛㄧ ɔːi	ㄨㄧ uːi	ㆾㄧ ɵy		ㄝㄧ ei
-ŋ	**ㄤ** aːŋ	**ㄥ** ɐŋ	ㄧㄫ ɪŋ	ㄛㄫ ɔːŋ	ㄨㄫ ʊŋ	ㆾㄫ œːŋ		ㄝㄫ ɛːŋ
-k	ㄚㄎ aːk̚	ㆿㄎ ɐk̚	ㄧㄎ ɪk̚	ㄛㄎ ɔːk̚	ㄨㄎ ʊk̚	ㆾㄎ œːk̚		ㄝㄎ ɛːk̚
-u	**ㄠ** aːu	**ㄡ** ɐu	ㄧㄨ iːu	ㄛㄨ ou				ㄝㄨ ɛːu^{2}
-m	ㄚㄇ aːm	ㆿㄇ ɐm	ㄧㄇ iːm					ㄝㄇ ɛːm^{2}
-p	ㄚㄆ aːp̚	ㆿㄆ ɐp̚	ㄧㄆ iːp̚					ㄝㄆ ɛːp̚^{2}

Notes:

^{1} Final ㆿ [ɐ] does not occur by itself.

^{2} Finals ㄝㄨ [ɛːu], ㄝㄇ [ɛːm], ㄝㄆ [ɛːp̚], ㄝㄊ [ɛːt̚], ㄝㄋ [ɛːn] only occur in colloquial readings, they were not included in the initial draft.

=== Tonal Marks ===
Tones can be left unmarked, but if necessary, you may mark them like in the table below.

Tone name	dark flat (陰平)	dark rising (陰上)	dark departing (陰去)	light flat (陽平)	light rising (陽上)	light departing (陽去)	upper dark entering (上陰入)	lower dark entering (下陰入)	light entering (陽入)
Tone number	1	2	3	4	5	6	7 (or 1)	8 (or 3)	9 (or 6)
Pitch Contour	˥ 55 / ˥˧ 53	˧˥ 35	˧ 33	˩ 11 / ˨˩ 21	˨˧ 23	˨ 22	˥ 5	˧ 3	˨ 2
Tone Marker	ˉ (usually omitted)	ˇ	ˋ	ˊ	˘	ˆ	˙	(unmarked)	ʻ
Example									

=== Examples ===
Traditional	Simplified	Cantonese Bopomofo
廣州話	广州话	ㆼㄛㄫˇ ㄐㄡˉ ㄨㄚˇ
粵語	粤语	ㄩㄊˆ ㄩ˘
你好		ㄋㄝㄧ˘ ㄏㄛㄨˇ

Sample transcription of one of the 300 Tang Poems:

春	ㄑ ㆾ ㄋˉ	曉	ㄏ ㄧ ㄨˇ
孟	ㄇ ㄤˆ	浩	ㄏ ㄛ ㄨˆ	然	ㄧ ㄫˆ
春	ㄑ ㆾ ㄋˉ	眠	ㄇ ㄧ ㄋˊ	不	ㄅ ㆿ ㄊˉ	覺	ㄍ ㄛ ㄎˋ	曉	ㄏ ㄧ ㄨˇ	，
處	ㄑ ㄩˋ	處	ㄑ ㄩˋ	聞	ㄇ ㄣˊ	啼	ㄊ ㄟˊ	鳥	ㄋ ㄧ ㄨ˘	，
夜	ㄧ ㄝˆ	來	ㄌ ㄛ ㄧˊ	風	ㄈ ㄨ ㄫˉ	雨	ㄩ˘	聲	ㄒ ㄧ ㄫˉ	，
花	ㄈ ㄚˉ	落	ㄌ ㄛ ㄎˆ	知	ㄐ ㄧˉ	多	ㄉ ㄛˉ	少	ㄒ ㄧ ㄨˇ	？
