= Bopomofo Extended =

- Range: U+31A0..U+31BF (32 code points)
- Plane: BMP
- Scripts: Bopomofo
- Major alphabets: phonetic Min Nan and Hakka
- Assigned: 32 code points
- Unused: 0 reserved code points

Unicode version history
- 3.0 (1999): 24 (+24)
- 6.0 (2010): 27 (+3)
- 13.0 (2020): 32 (+5)

Unicode documentation
- Code chart ∣ Web page

Bopomofo Extended is a Unicode block containing additional Bopomofo characters for writing phonetic Min Nan, Hakka Chinese, Cantonese, Hmu, and Ge. The basic set of Bopomofo characters can be found in the Bopomofo block.

== Block ==
Bopomofo Extended^{[1]} Official Unicode Consortium code chart (PDF)
	0	1	2	3	4	5	6	7	8	9	A	B	C	D	E	F
U+31Ax	ㆠ	ㆡ	ㆢ	ㆣ	ㆤ	ㆥ	ㆦ	ㆧ	ㆨ	ㆩ	ㆪ	ㆫ	ㆬ	ㆭ	ㆮ	ㆯ
U+31Bx	ㆰ	ㆱ	ㆲ	ㆳ	ㆴ	ㆵ	ㆶ	ㆷ	ㆸ	ㆹ	ㆺ	ㆻ	ㆼ	ㆽ	ㆾ	ㆿ
Notes: 1. As of Unicode version 16.0

== History ==
The following Unicode-related documents record the purpose and process of defining specific characters in the Bopomofo Extended block:

Version	Final code points (Note: Proposed code points and characters names may differ from final code points and names)	Count	L2 ID	WG2 ID	Document
3.0	U+31A0..31B7	24	L2/98-090	N1713R	Proposal to add 24 extended Bopomofo and 2 modifier letters for Minnan and Hakka, 1998-03-19
3.0	U+31A0..31B7	24	L2/98-158		Aliprand, Joan; Winkler, Arnold (1998-05-26), "Bopomofo Extensions", Draft Minutes – UTC #76 & NCITS Subgroup L2 #173 joint meeting, Tredyffrin, Pennsylvania, April 20-22, 1998
3.0	U+31A0..31B7	24	L2/98-286	N1703	Umamaheswaran, V. S.; Ksar, Mike (1998-07-02), "8.25", Unconfirmed Meeting Minutes, WG 2 Meeting #34, Redmond, WA, USA; 1998-03-16--20
3.0	U+31A0..31B7	24	L2/98-321	N1905	Revised text of 10646-1/FPDAM 23, AMENDMENT 23: Bopomofo Extended and other characters, 1998-10-22
3.0	U+31A0..31B7	24	L2/18-255	N4980	Tung, Bobby; Ko, But; Wei, Selena (2018-06-13), Proposal to Fix Glyphs in Bopomofo Extended Block and Encode one Bopomofo Letter
6.0	U+31B8..31BA	3	L2/09-049	N3570	West, Andrew (2009-01-25), Proposal to encode three Bopomofo letters for Hmu and Ge
6.0	U+31B8..31BA	3	L2/09-003R		Moore, Lisa (2009-02-12), "B.15.15", UTC #118 / L2 #215 Minutes
6.0	U+31B8..31BA	3	L2/09-234	N3603 (pdf, doc)	Umamaheswaran, V. S. (2009-07-08), "M54.13f", Unconfirmed minutes of WG 2 meeting 54
13.0	U+31BB	1	L2/18-255	N4980	Tung, Bobby; Ko, But; Wei, Selena (2018-06-13), Proposal to Fix Glyphs in Bopomofo Extended Block and Encode one Bopomofo Letter
13.0	U+31BB	1	L2/18-183		Moore, Lisa (2018-11-20), "C.21", UTC #156 Minutes
13.0	U+31BB	1		N5020 (pdf, doc)	Umamaheswaran, V. S. (2019-01-11), "10.3.16", Unconfirmed minutes of WG 2 meeting 67
13.0	U+31BC..31BF	4	L2/19-100		Chan, Eiso (2019-04-08), Preliminary proposal to encode four extended Bopomofo letters for Cantonese
13.0	U+31BC..31BF	4	L2/19-173		Anderson, Deborah; et al. (2019-04-29), "18", Recommendations to UTC #159 April-May 2019 on Script Proposals
13.0	U+31BC..31BF	4	L2/19-177R	N5052	Yang, Ben; Chan, Eiso (2019-05-02), Proposal to encode Cantonese Bopomofo Characters
13.0	U+31BC..31BF	4	L2/19-122		Moore, Lisa (2019-05-08), "Consensus 159-C21", UTC #159 Minutes
13.0	U+31BC..31BF	4		N5122	"M68.10 and M68.19", Unconfirmed minutes of WG 2 meeting 68, 2019-12-31

== See also ==
- Spacing Modifier Letters (Unicode block) has two Bopomofo characters: U+02EA–U+02EB
