= The China Post =

English-language Taiwanese newspaper

The China Post 英文中國郵報
- Type: Daily newspaper and News agency
- Format: Broadsheet
- Owner: The China Post Group
- Publisher: The China Post Group
- Founded: 1952 (74 years ago)
- Ceased publication: 2017
- Political alignment: Pan-blue
- Headquarters: Taipei, Taiwan
- Website: chinapost.nownews.com

The China Post
- Traditional Chinese: 英文中國郵報
- Simplified Chinese: 英文中国邮报
- Literal meaning: English China Post
Transcriptions
Standard Mandarin
- Hanyu Pinyin: Yīngwén Zhōngguó Yóubào
Southern Min
- Hokkien POJ: Eng-bûn Tiong-kok iû-pò

The China Post (Chinese: 英文中國郵報) was an English-language newspaper published in Taiwan, established by Mr. and Mrs. Y. P. Huang in 1952. It became a member of Asia News Network in 2008.

In April 2017, the China Post announced that the print edition of the publication would end on 15 May 2017, though the website and mobile application would remain active. In October 2017, the original China Post website was discontinued and merged with news agency NOWnews. In 2021, the China Post was discontinued.

== The Sunday Post ==
The Sunday Post was the Sunday edition of The China Post, featuring comics and a two-page bilingual supplement for advanced ESL students.

== See also ==
- Asia News Network
