= Kinmen Daily News =

- Type: Daily
- Owner(s): Kinmen Daily News Publisher (金門日報社), Kinmen County Government
- Editor-in-chief: Chen Ko-Hsing (陳國興)
- Founded: 3 September 1957
- City: Kinmen County (Quemoy), Fujian Province (Fukien)
- Country: Republic of China (Taiwan)
- Website: kmdn.gov.tw

Kinmen Daily News (KMDN; Chinese: 金門日報; pinyin: Jīnmén Rìbào; Pe̍h-ōe-jī: Kim-mn̂g-ji̍t-pò) is a newspaper owned by Kinmen County Government in Kinmen County (Quemoy), Fujian Province, Republic of China (Taiwan).

== History ==
The predecessor of the Kinmen Daily News was Chunghwa Cheng Chi Pao (中華正氣報, Zhōnghuá-zhèngqìbào) from Nancheng, Jiangxi, which retreated to Quemoy following the Chinese Civil War. Kinmen Daily News started publishing on October 31, 1965. From November 7, 1992, onwards, the operation of two newspapers were split. Chunghwa Cheng Chi Pao was changed into a weekly paper, and is distributed to the military on Quemoy. Kinmen Daily News was transferred to the Kinmen County Government, and continued to be published daily.

The Kinmen Daily News has been criticized as being used to support incumbent county magistrates in their campaigns for reelection.

== See also ==
- Media of Taiwan
- Matsu Daily
