= Wang Hsing-ching =

Taiwanese journalist (1946–2025)

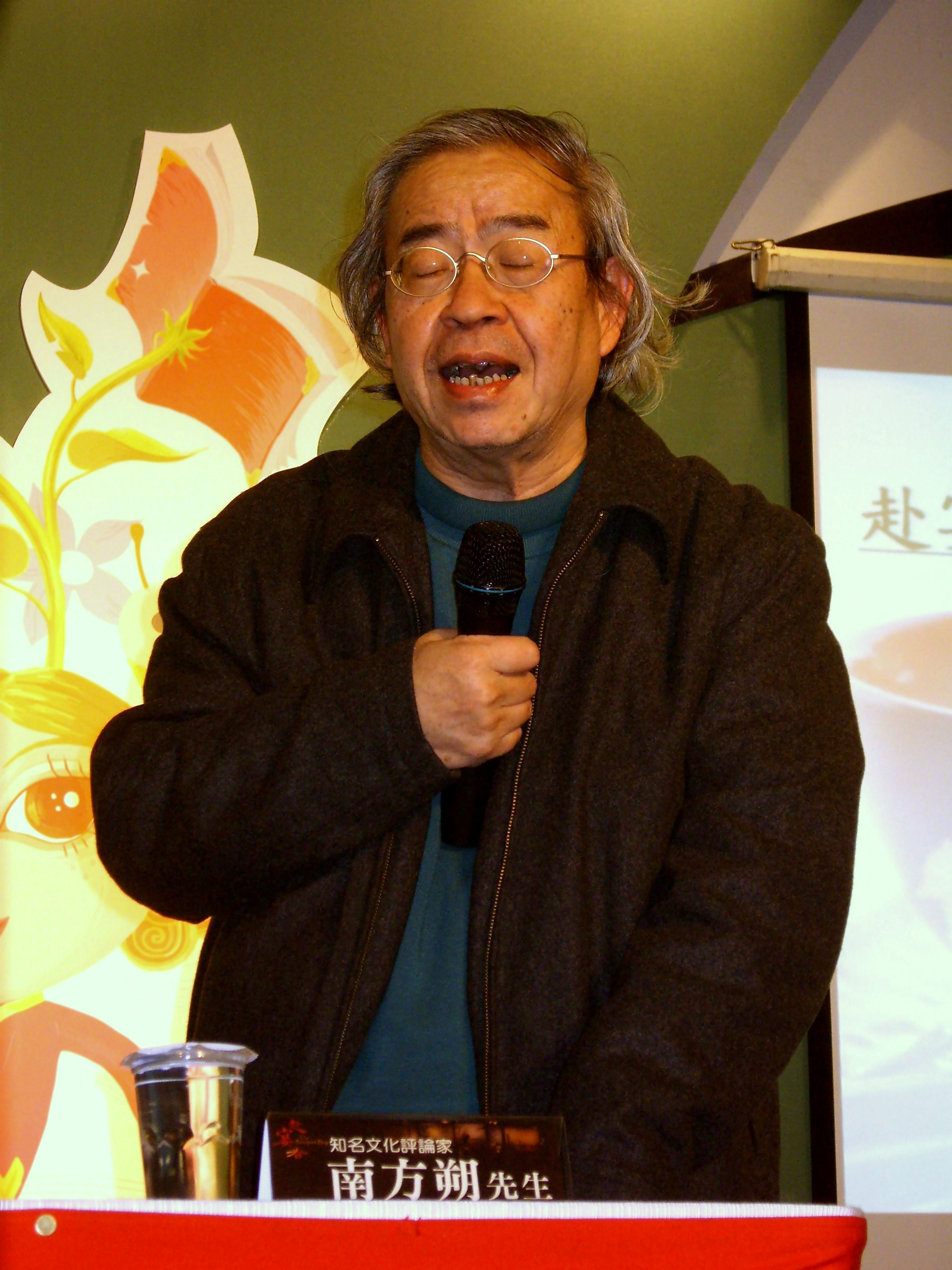
Wang at the 2008 Taipei International Book Exhibition

Wang Hsing-ching (simplified Chinese: 王杏庆; traditional Chinese: 王杏慶; pinyin: Wáng Xìngqìng; 1946 – 9 June 2025), whose pseudonym was Nanfang Shuo (南方朔, Nánfāng Shuò), was a Taiwanese journalist, political commentator and cultural critic. Until his death, he was the chief editor and writer of The Journalist magazine (新新聞週刊), with commentaries on current issues in major newspapers. He co-founded The Journalist when he was in his 40s. His writings, including Western ideas analysis, social phenomena criticism, and literature comments, were all regarded as very influential. Crediting his intellectual contribution to society, he was known as "the most industrious private scholar in Taiwan".

== Background ==
Wang was born in 1946. He earned his undergraduate degree in the School for Forestry and Resource Conservation, from National Taiwan University and a doctorate degree at Chinese Culture University. The Senkaku (Diaoyutai) Island incident made Wang reach an epiphany to become a journalist. During that period, Wang abandoned his overseas study plan and stayed in Taiwan, starting his career. His first journalist job was at the Taiwanese newspaper National Evening News (Chinese: 民族晚報). In the 1970s, Wang was a reporter for the Taiwan Times, and afterwards worked as a writer, vice-general editor, and general editor in The China Times (中國時報). Although he had never received technical university training in journalism, he had more than twenty years of experience in the mass media as a news commentator.

== Style and major themes of writing ==
Wang, as an author, began with topics mainly concerned about cultural changes, political changes, and the controversies in society. His early works were based on the themes of describing and criticizing cultures and politics, e.g. Diguo zhuyi yu Taiwan duli yundong (帝國主義與臺灣獨立運動). Later in his career, he started publishing critical book reviews. Towards his death, Wang published a series of books about "Language". Magical Eyes, his last book, (魔幻之眼) is his first published work in the book commentary collection. As a tutor through writing, his analysis focused on culture, history, thoughts, politics, etc.

== Contributions to journalism ==
Wang was never shy about expressing his critical opinions on current affairs. In the summer of 2004, he attended a forum in the Hong Kong Convention and Exhibition Centre concerning the political issues in Taiwan and relations across the Taiwan Strait after the presidential election. He suggested that the two shores of the Strait should make positive interactions in order to solve the rational problems.

As a journalist and the chief writer of The Journalist magazine, he had his own independent analysis towards political issues. Not long after President Chen Shuibien gave the speech of "One State on Each Side", he wrote critiques on it, which were exactly to the point, "democracy in Taiwan is already moving towards a new and populist type of soft politics of terror".

== Views on journalism ==
In a public discussion titled "How to build a mass media culture with "taste"?" Wang criticized the current mass media culture. He pointed out that if the speakers/interviewees could not state their stance clearly, they had to "pay the price" in the sense that reporters might twist their words to make a story more dramatic. The unethical reporting of some journalists disappointed Wang, and he urged that journalists had to realize that it was shameful to have disregarded the obligation to report the truth.

At a societal level, he emphasized that not only do the mass media deliver information to the public, but they also affect the social structure and the political environment. He noted that journalists should bear in mind that they have great responsibilities to the general public.

Particularly in Taiwan, he put the blame of the current situation on changes in political conditions. During this unstable period, different types of mass media emerged. As advertising played a greater role in the mass media, it was inevitable that politicians would make use of the mass media for propaganda. However, he said that there were still journalists who stood by their principles, although it remained difficult for them to uphold journalistic ethics.

== Seeing literature as journalism ==
In an RTHK TV program "Merry Book Worm" in October 2003, (愈讀愈快樂 (www.rthk.org.hk/rthk/tv/bookworm/20031026.html inactive as of 2008-05-07), 5 Oct 04.) Wang shared his opinions on how to choose suitable books for ourselves. He raised questions on how topics of certain discourses are set, why the topics are written the way they are, and how the written formats differ from author to author, and suggested that these were the aspects one had to think about when one chose books to read. Also, Wang stressed that it was necessary for every author to get basic and wide-ranging knowledge on different areas before having any discussion or analysis. With his literature commentaries in Magical Eyes (魔幻之眼), Nanfang Shuo attempted to give his readers a brief overview on his recommended books to help them choose readings.

Wang's views on literature tied in well in the principles in journalism. While literary commenting allowed his audience to have a knowledge of what was currently happening in the world, reporters were also doing the same thing: making readers aware of current affairs. Speaking about journalism, he said that we, as readers, had to be careful about different reporters' stances and their different perspectives based on various sources. On the other hand, reporters should always bear the obligation to the truth and be objective by relying on the more reliable sources.

In another interview from Central News Agency (news.pchome.com.tw/life/can/20030408/index-20030408165736010244.html inactive as of 2008-05-07) in Taiwan, Wang pointed out that readers are not encouraged to spend too much time on books which are too difficult to be digested or too easy to read. In the interview, Wang encouraged readers to find the books which would motivate them and those which can give them new perspectives. Applying Wang's views on reading, journalism, and news reports, readers should focus their attention on news of particular interest to them, ones which they feel comfortable to read and criticize. Moreover, Wang believed that readers are responsible for the verification of reports.

== Views on reading ==
As a commentator of literature, Wang welcomed all different genres of books. He firmly believed that all books can be beneficial and that the more one reads, the more one will gain in that field of expertise. He recalled that in his childhood, he was unable to do anything but read.

One of Wang's beliefs was that different aspects of wisdom are all interrelated. For him, the concepts of literature, history, and social theory could be easily understood. He believed that literature, poetry, politics, and philosophy were mutually related. Having this understanding, Wang liked to use poems to interpret international politics and the economic phenomenon in recent years. This proves that as a commentator of current affairs and as chief writer of The Journalist, he used a literary style to write journalistic articles.

A few years before his death, Wang discovered an interest in linguistics. Some of Wang's inspirations stemmed from Chinese classical literature, novels, and prose, while some of them came from news reports. Researching the origin and history of the common vocabularies, he also investigated the changing process of these vocabularies in society. To him, this changing process can be seen from the use of language in news reports, for the language the reporters use marks the changes in social value. In fact, his motivation and his way to learn about the origins of vocabulary were very applicable to the elements of journalism: both fields require accurate information, and verification by different reliable sources. One can only tell the truth (of events or the origin of vocabularies) after verifications.

Wang was a libertarian, and he believed that it is important to be aware of the language ambiguity in understanding readings. As there are some writers who easily confuse readers, with or without intention, great language skills and a critical mind are essential to make oneself clear about what one is reading and what the writers are telling.

== Comments on literature ==
Wang was one of the committee members to adjudicate the "20th century 100 greatest Chinese novels". As the novels revealed to Wang a feeling of sorrow and a sense of pressure, he commented on the 20th century Chinese novels as a reflection of Chinese history in the past 100 years which he saw as a difficult and suffering period for intellectuals.

== Death ==
Wang died on 9 June 2025, at the age of 79.

== Bibliography ==
- (靈犀之眼：閱讀大師2) Lingxi zhi Yan : Yuedu Dashi 2 18 June 2004
- (語言之鑰) Yuyan zhi Yao 23 March 2004
- (白遼士浮士德的天譴) Bailiaoshi Fushide de Tianqian 21 December 2003
- Magical Eyes (魔幻之眼) Mo Wan Zhi Yan 31 March 2003
- (詩戀記) Shilian ji 5 January 2003
- Language is our Hope (語言是我們的希望) Yuyan shi Women de Xiwang 1 July 2002
- Write myself a poem (給自己一首詩) Gei Ziji Yi Shou Shi 1 September 2001
- Under the Sky of Language (在語言的天空下) Zai yuyan de tiankong xia 1 May 2001
- (除魔與昇華) Cho Mo yu Sheng Hua 10 April 2001
- Language is Our Ocean (語言是我們的海洋) Yuyan shi Women de Haiyang 1 August 2000
- Where There is Light (有光的所在) You Guang de Suo Zai 1 February 2000
- (經濟是權力，也是文學) Jingji shi quanli, ye shi Wenxue 1 October 1999
- Language is Our Star-map (語言是我們的星圖) Yuyan shi Women de Xingtu 5 March 1999
- (世紀末抒情) Shi Ji Mo Shu Qing 10 September 1998
- Dwelling in language (語言是我們的居所) Yu Yan Shi Wo Men De Ju Suo 15 January 1998
- (如何做一個積極的公民) Ruhe zuo Yige Jiji de Gongmin 1 November 1995
- Critique of the Li Teng-hui era (李登輝時代的批判) Li Denghui shidai de Pipan 16 April 1994
- (自由主義的反思批判) Ziyou zhuyi de fansi Pipan 16 March 1994
- (憤怒之愛 : 六零年代美國學生運動) Fen nu zhi ai : liu ling nian dai Meiguo xue sheng yu dong 1991
- The King Edaepus (伊底帕斯王的悲劇) Yi De Pa Si Wang de Bei Ju
- (自由主義之最後堡壘) Zi You Zhu Yi Zhi Zui Hou Pu Lei
- (自由主義的反思批判) Zi You Zhu Yi De Fan Si Bi Ban
- (另一種英雄 : 反體制的思想與人物) Ling yi zhong ying xiong : Fan ti zhi de si xiang yu ren wu
- (文化啟示錄) Wen Hua Qi Shi Lu
