= Bopomofo =

Semisyllabary used to transcribe Chinese

- The word "encyclopedia" (bǎikē quánshū) written in bopomofo (b-ai k-e q-u-an sh-u)
- Script type: Semisyllabary with diacritics for tones
- Creator: Commission on the Unification of Pronunciation; Introduced by the Beiyang government of the Republic of China
- Period: Mainland China (1918–1958); Xiandai Hanyu Cidian (1960–present; as a supplement to Hanyu Pinyin); Taiwan (1945–present)
- Direction: Left-to-right, bidirectional text, vertical writing, vertical right-to-left

Related scripts
- Parent systems: Oracle bone script: Seal script; Clerical script; Han script; Bopomofo
- Child systems: Cantonese bopomofo, Taiwanese Phonetic Symbols, Suzhou Phonetic Symbols, Hmu Phonetic Symbols, Matsu Fuchounese bopomofo

ISO 15924
- ISO 15924: Bopo (285), Bopomofo

Unicode
- Unicode alias: Bopomofo
- Unicode range: U+3100–U+312F (Bopomofo); U+31A0–U+31BF (Bopomofo Extended)

Mandarin Phonetic Symbols

Chinese name
- Traditional Chinese: 注音符號
- Simplified Chinese: 注音符号
Transcriptions
Standard Mandarin
- Hanyu Pinyin: Zhùyīn fúhào
- Bopomofo: ㄓㄨˋ ㄧㄣ ㄈㄨˊ ㄏㄠˋ
- Gwoyeu Romatzyh: Juh'in fwuhaw
- Wade–Giles: Chu^{4}-yin^{1} fu^{2}-hao^{4}
- Tongyong Pinyin: Jhù-yin fú-hào
- Yale Romanization: Jùyīn fúhàu
- MPS2: Jùyīn fúhàu
- IPA: [ʈʂû.ín fǔ.xâʊ]
Yue: Cantonese
- Yale Romanization: Jyuyām Fùhhóu
- Jyutping: Zyu3 jam1 fu4 hou2
- IPA: [tsy˧ jɐm˥ fu˩ hɔw˧˥]
Southern Min
- Hokkien POJ: Chù-im hû-hō
- Tâi-lô: Tsù-im hû-hō

Korean name
- Hangul: 주음부호
- Hanja: 注音符號
Transcriptions
- Revised Romanization: jueumbuho
- McCune–Reischauer: chuŭmbuho

Bopomofo, also called Zhuyin Fuhao (/dʒuː.ˌjɪn fuː.ˈhaʊ/ joo-YIN foo-HOW; 注音符號; Zhùyīn fúhào; 'phonetic symbols'), or simply Zhuyin, is a transliteration system for Standard Chinese and other Sinitic languages. It is the principal method of teaching Mandarin pronunciation in Taiwan. It consists of 37 characters and five tone marks, which together can transcribe all possible sounds in Mandarin Chinese.

Bopomofo was first introduced in China during the 1910s by the Beiyang government, where it was used alongside Wade–Giles, a romanization system which used a modified Latin alphabet. Today, Bopomofo is more common in Taiwan than on the mainland, and is used as the primary electronic input method for Taiwanese Mandarin, as well as in dictionaries and other non-official documents.

== Terminology ==
Bopomofo is the name used for the system by the International Organization for Standardization (ISO) and Unicode. Analogous to how the word alphabet is derived from the names of the first two letters in the Greek alphabet, alpha and beta, the name bopomofo derives from the first four syllabographs in the system's conventional consonant order: ㄅ, ㄆ, ㄇ, and ㄈ.

In Taiwan, the system is commonly known by its official name Zhuyin fuhao (注音符號; 'phonetic symbols'), or simply as zhuyin (注音; 'phonetic notation'). In official documents, it is occasionally called Mandarin Phonetic Symbols I (國語注音符號第一式), abbreviated as "MPS I" (注音一式), to distinguish it from the Mandarin Phonetic Symbols II (MPS II) system published in 1984. Formerly, the system was named Guoyin zimu (國音字母; 'national language alphabet') and Zhuyin zimu (注音字母; 'phonetic alphabet').

== History ==
=== Origins ===
The Commission on the Unification of Pronunciation, led by Wu Zhihui from 1912 to 1913, created a system called Zhuyin Zimu, which was based on Zhang Binglin's shorthand. It was used as the official phonetic script to annotate the sounds of the characters in accordance with the Old National Pronunciation. A draft was released on 11 July 1913, by the Republic of China National Ministry of Education, but it was not officially proclaimed until 23 November 1928. It was first named Guóyīn Zìmǔ 'national pronunciation alphabet', but in April 1930 was renamed Zhùyīn Fúhào 'phonetic symbols' to address fears that the alphabetic system might independently replace Chinese characters.

=== Modern use ===
A guide on how to typeset Bopomofo alongside characters. (1936, Li Jinxi)

Bopomofo is the predominant phonetic system in teaching reading and writing in elementary school in Taiwan. In elementary school, particularly in the lower years, Chinese characters in textbooks are often annotated with Bopomofo as ruby characters as an aid to learning. Additionally, one children's newspaper in Taiwan, the Mandarin Daily News, annotates all articles with Bopomofo ruby characters.

It is also the most common system for the Taiwanese to enter Chinese characters into computers and smartphones, and to look up characters in a dictionary.

In teaching Mandarin, Taiwan institutions and some overseas communities, such as Filipino Chinese, use Bopomofo.

Bopomofo is shown in a position secondary to that of Hanyu Pinyin in all editions of Xiandai Hanyu Cidian from the 1960 edition to the current 2016 edition (7th edition).

Bopomofo is also used to transcribe other Chinese languages, most commonly Taiwanese Hokkien and Cantonese; however, its use can be applied to practically any variety in handwriting (because not all letters are encoded). Outside of Chinese, Bopomofo letters are also used in Hmu and Ge languages by a small number of Hmu Christians.

== Symbols ==
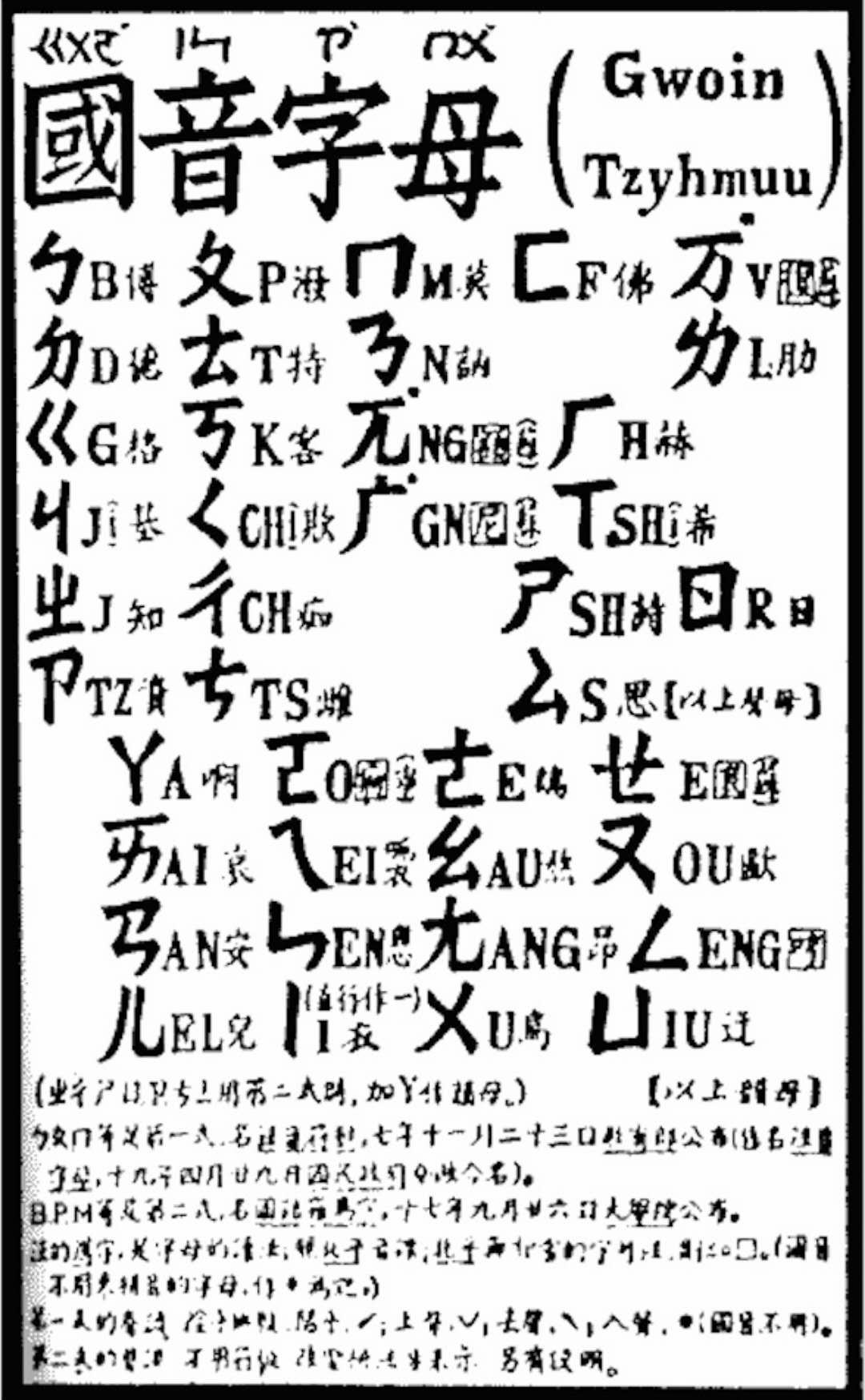
Table of Bopomofo, with romanization given in Gwoyeu Romatzyh

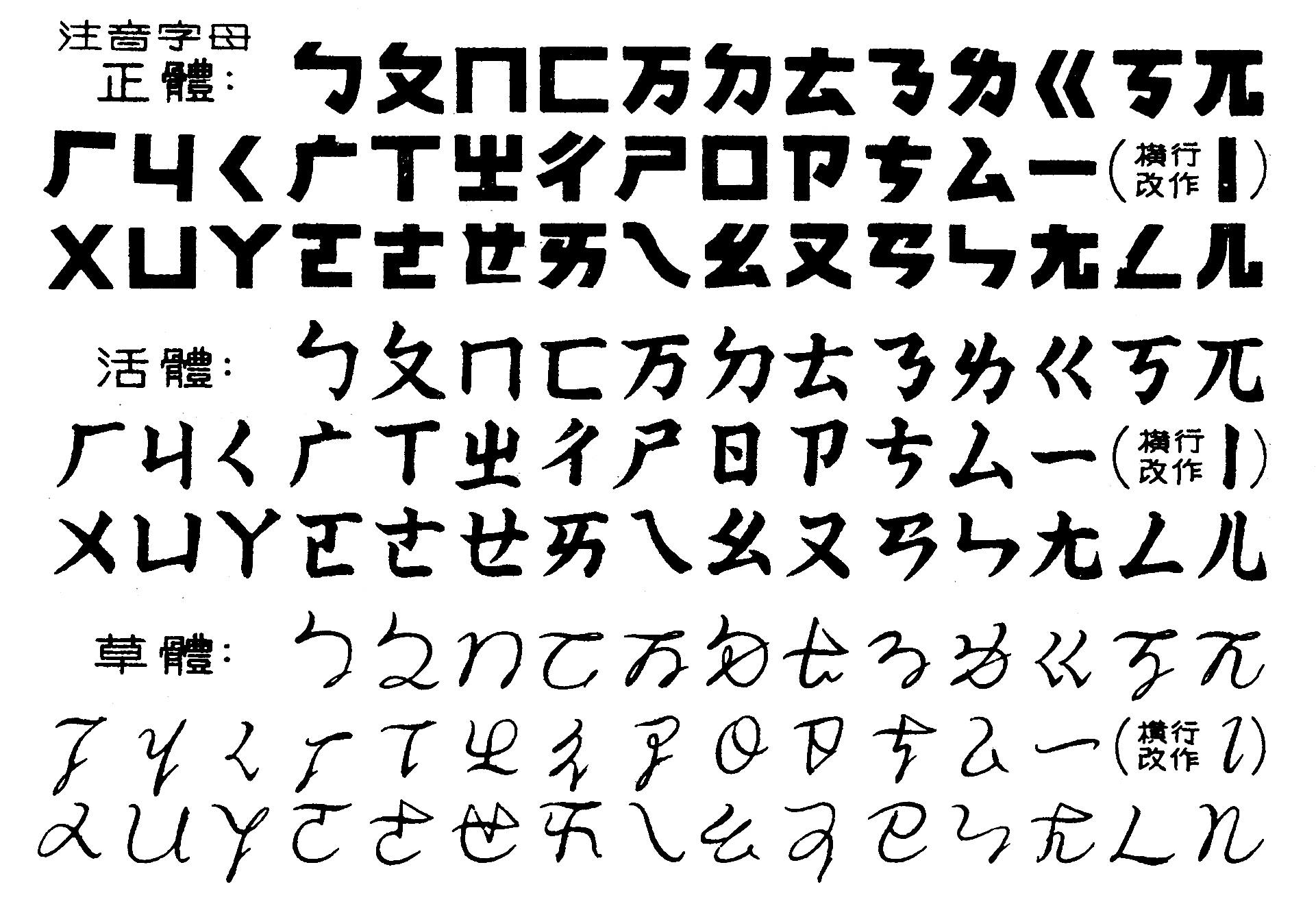
Bopomofo in Regular, Handwritten Regular & Cursive formats

The Bopomofo characters were created by Zhang Binglin, taken mainly from "regularized" forms of ancient Chinese characters, the modern readings of which contain the sound that each letter represents. The consonants are listed in order of place of articulation, from the front of the mouth to the back, /b/, /p/, /m/, /f/, /d/, /t/, /n/, /l/, etc.

Origin of bopomofo symbols

Consonants
Bopomofo	Origin	IPA	Pinyin	WG	Example
ㄅ	From 勹, the ancient form and current top portion of 包 bāo, "to wrap up; package"	p˭	b	p	包 bāo ㄅㄠ
ㄆ	From 攵, a variant form of 攴 pū, "to knock lightly".	pʰ	p	pʻ	撲 pū ㄆㄨ
ㄇ	From 冂, the archaic character and current "cover" radical 冖 mì.	m	m	m	冞 mí ㄇㄧˊ
ㄈ	From the "right open box" radical 匚 fāng.	f	f	f	匪 fěi ㄈㄟˇ
ㄪ	From 万, a simplification of 萬 wàn, "ten thousand". No longer used in Mandarin transcription.	v	—N/a	v	尾 wěi ㄨㄟˇ (ㄪㄟˇ)
ㄉ	From 𠚣, archaic form of 刀 dāo, "blade". Compare the Shuowen seal.	t˭	d	t	地 dì ㄉㄧˋ
ㄊ	From 𠫓 tū, an upside-down form of 子 zǐ and an ancient form of 突 tū ( and in seal script)	tʰ	t	tʻ	提 tí ㄊㄧˊ
ㄋ	From /𠄎, ancient form of 乃 nǎi, "to be" (a copula in Classical Chinese).	n	n	n	你 nǐ ㄋㄧˇ
ㄌ	From 𠠲, archaic form of 力 lì, "power".	l	l	l	利 lì ㄌㄧˋ
ㄍ	From the obsolete character 巜 guì/kuài, "ditch".	k˭	g	k	告 gào ㄍㄠˋ
ㄎ	From the archaic character, now "breath" or "sigh" component 丂 kǎo.	kʰ	k	kʻ	考 kǎo ㄎㄠˇ
ㄫ	From 兀 wù, "towering". No longer used in Mandarin transcription.	ŋ	ng	ng	五 wǔ ㄨˇ (ㄫㄨˇ)
ㄏ	From the archaic character and current radical 厂 hǎn.	x~h	h	h	好 hǎo ㄏㄠˇ
ㄐ	From the archaic character 丩 jiū.	tɕ˭	j	ch	叫 jiào ㄐㄧㄠˋ
ㄑ	From the archaic character 𡿨 quǎn, graphic root of the character 巛 chuān, "river" (modern 川).	tɕʰ	q	chʻ	巧 qiǎo ㄑㄧㄠˇ
ㄬ	From the archaic character 广 yǎn, "dotted cliff". Not used in Mandarin anymore.	ɲ	gn	gn	眼 yǎn ㄧㄢˇ (广ㄧㄢˇ)
ㄒ	From 丅, an ancient form of 下 xià, "under".	ɕ	x	hs	小 xiǎo ㄒㄧㄠˇ
ㄓ	From /𡳿, archaic form of 之 zhī, a genitive marker in Classical Chinese.	ʈʂ˭	zhi, zh-	ch	知 zhī ㄓ; 主 zhǔ ㄓㄨˇ
ㄔ	From the character and radical 彳 chì	ʈʂʰ	chi, ch-	chʻ	吃 chī ㄔ; 出 chū ㄔㄨ
ㄕ	From 𡰣, an ancient form of 尸 shī	ʂ	shi, sh-	sh	是 shì ㄕˋ; 束 shù ㄕㄨˋ
ㄖ	Modified from the seal script form of 日 rì, "day" or "sun".	ɻ~ʐ	ri, r-	j	日 rì ㄖˋ; 入 rù ㄖㄨˋ
ㄗ	From the archaic character and current radical 卩 jié, dialectically zié ([tsjě]; tsieh² in Wade–Giles)	ts˭	zi, z-	ts	字 zì ㄗˋ; 在 zài ㄗㄞˋ
ㄘ	From 𠀁, archaic form of 七 qī, dialectically ciī ([tsʰí]; tsʻi¹ in Wade–Giles). Compare semi-cursive form and seal-script.	tsʰ	ci, c-	tsʻ	詞 cí ㄘˊ; 才 cái ㄘㄞˊ
ㄙ	From the archaic character 厶 sī, which was later replaced by its compound 私 sī.	s	si, s-	s	四 sì ㄙˋ; 塞 sāi ㄙㄞ

Rhymes and medials
Bopomofo	Origin	IPA	Pinyin	WG	Example
ㄚ	From 丫 yā	a	a	a	大 dà ㄉㄚˋ
ㄛ	From the obsolete character 𠀀 hē, inhalation, the reverse of 丂 kǎo, which is preserved as a phonetic in the compound 可 kě.	o	o	o	多 duō ㄉㄨㄛ
ㄜ	Derived from its allophone in Standard Chinese, ㄛ o	ɤ	e	o/ê	得 dé ㄉㄜˊ
ㄝ	From 也 yě, "also". Compare the Warring States bamboo form	e	-ie/ê	eh	爹 diē ㄉㄧㄝ
ㄞ	From 𠀅 hài, archaic form of 亥.	ai	ai	ai	晒 shài ㄕㄞˋ
ㄟ	From 乁 yí, an obsolete character meaning 移 yí, "to move".	ei	ei	ei	誰 shéi ㄕㄟˊ
ㄠ	From 幺 yāo	au	ao	ao	少 shǎo ㄕㄠˇ
ㄡ	From 又 yòu	ou	ou	ou	收 shōu ㄕㄡ
ㄢ	From the archaic character 𢎘 hàn "to bloom", preserved as a phonetic in the compound 犯 fàn	an	an	an	山 shān ㄕㄢ
ㄣ	From 𠃉, archaic variant of 鳦 yǐ or 乚 yà (乚 is yǐn according to other sources)	ən	en	ên	申 shēn ㄕㄣ
ㄤ	From 尢 wāng	aŋ	ang	ang	上 shàng ㄕㄤˋ
ㄥ	From 𠃋, archaic form of 肱 gōng	əŋ	eng	êng	生 shēng ㄕㄥ
ㄦ	From 儿, the bottom portion of 兒 ér used as a cursive and simplified form	ɚ	er	êrh	而 ér ㄦˊ
ㄧ	From 一 yī, "one"	i	y, yi, -i	i	以 yǐ ㄧˇ; 逆 nì ㄋㄧˋ
ㄨ	From 㐅, ancient form of 五 wǔ, "five". Compare the transitory form 𠄡.	u	w, wu, -u	u/w	努 nǔ ㄋㄨˇ; 我 wǒ ㄨㄛˇ
ㄩ	From the ancient character 𠙴 qū	y	yu, -ü	ü/yü	雨 yǔ ㄩˇ; 女 nǚ ㄋㄩˇ
ㄭ	From the character 帀. It represents the fricative vowel of ㄓ，ㄔ，ㄕ，ㄖ，ㄗ，ㄘ，ㄙ，though it is not used after them in transcription.	ɻ̩~ʐ̩, ɹ̩~z̩	-i	ih/ŭ	資 zī ㄗ; 知 zhī ㄓ; 死 sǐ ㄙˇ

== Writing ==
=== Stroke order ===
Bopomofo is written in the same stroke order rule as Chinese characters. However, the number of strokes can differ from the derived character and the Bopomofo character. For example, ㄖ is written with three strokes, unlike the character from which it is derived (Chinese: 日; pinyin: rì), which has four strokes.

ㄧ can be written as a vertical line or a horizontal line; both are accepted forms. Traditionally, it should be written as a horizontal line in vertical writing, and a vertical line in horizontal writing. The People's Republic of China almost exclusively uses horizontal writing, so the vertical form (in the rare occasion that Bopomofo is used) has become the standard form there. Language education in Taiwan generally uses vertical writing, so most people learn it as a horizontal line, and use a horizontal form even in horizontal writing. In 2008, the Taiwanese Ministry of Education decided that the primary form should always be the horizontal form, but that the vertical form is an accepted alternative. Unicode 8.0.0 published an errata in 2014 that updates the representative glyph to be the horizontal form. Computer fonts may only display one form or the other, or may be able to display both if the font is aware of changes needed for vertical writing.

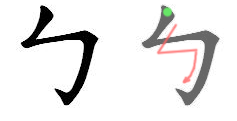

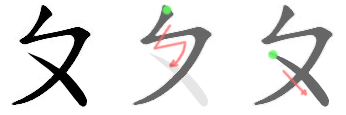

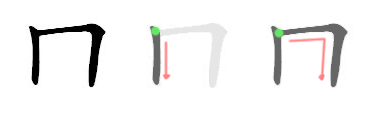

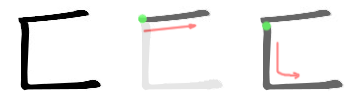

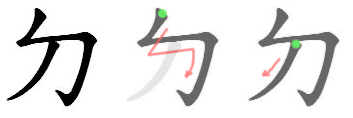

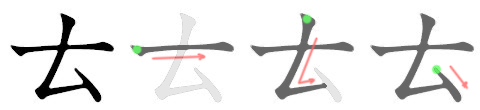

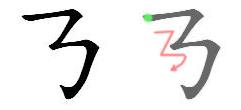

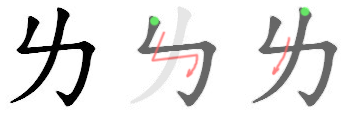

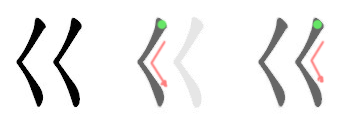

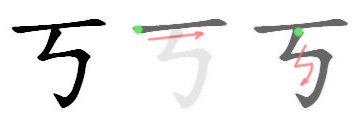

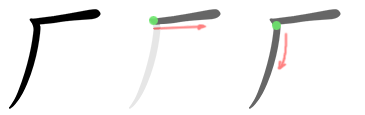

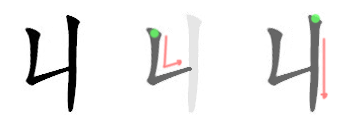

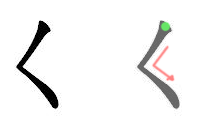

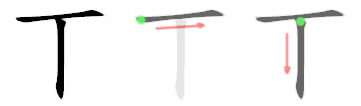

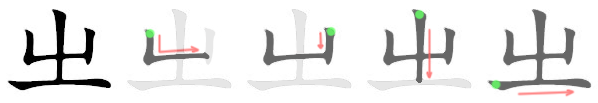

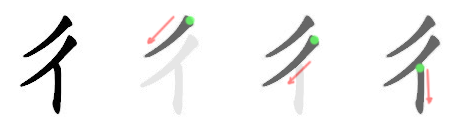

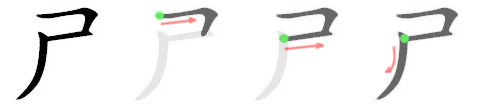

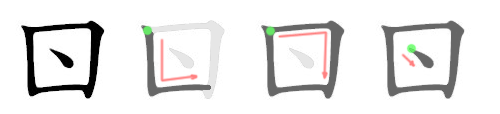

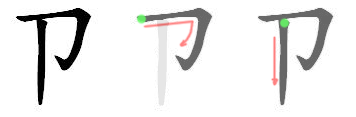

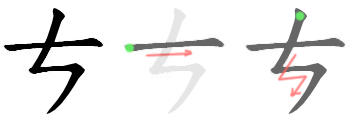

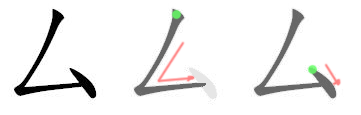

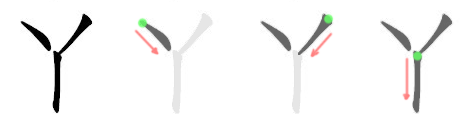

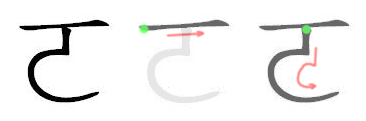

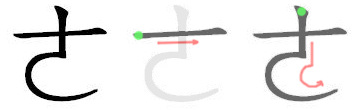

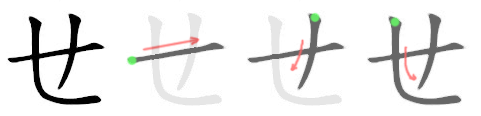

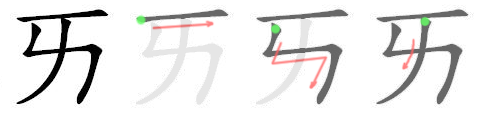

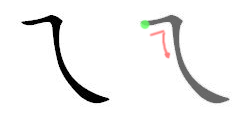

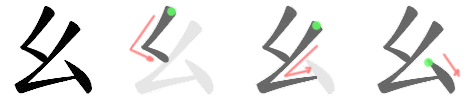

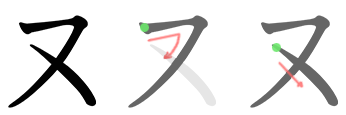

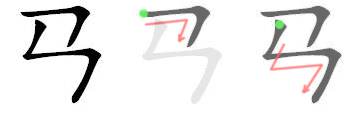

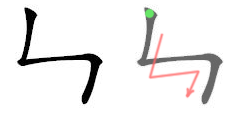

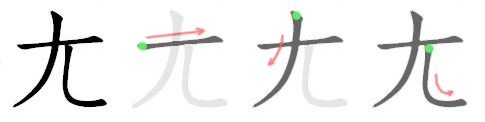

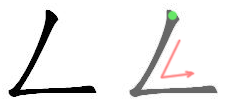

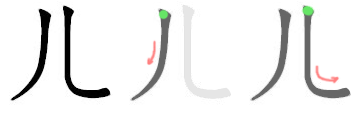

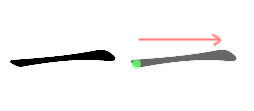

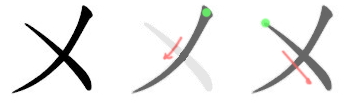

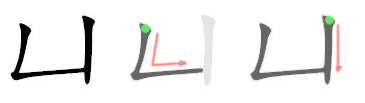

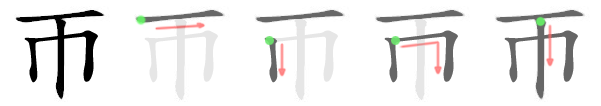

Bopomofo is occasionally unofficially handwritten as syllable blocks, similar to Hangul, however this is not considered an accepted form by the People's Republic of China nor the Republic of China, and it is unsupported by Unicode.

=== Tonal marks ===
As shown in the following table, tone marks for the second, third, and fourth tones are shared between bopomofo and pinyin. In bopomofo, the mark for first tone is usually omitted but can be included, while a dot above indicates the fifth tone (also known as the neutral tone). In pinyin, a macron (overbar) indicates the first tone, and the lack of a marker usually indicates the fifth (light) tone.

Tone	Bopomofo		Pinyin	
Tone	Tone Marker	Unicode Name	Tone Marker	Unicode Name
1	ˉ	Modifier Letter Macron (usually omitted)	◌̄	Combining Macron
2	ˊ	Modifier Letter Acute Accent	◌́	Combining Acute Accent
3	ˇ	Caron	◌̌	Combining Caron
4	ˋ	Modifier Letter Grave Accent	◌̀	Combining Grave Accent
5	˙	Dot Above	·	Middle Dot (usually omitted)

Unlike Hanyu Pinyin, Bopomofo aligns well with the Chinese characters in books whose texts are printed vertically, making Bopomofo better suited for annotating the pronunciation of vertically oriented Chinese text.

When used in conjunction with Chinese characters, Bopomofo is typically placed to the right of the Chinese character vertically in both vertical print and horizontal print or to the top of the Chinese character in horizontal print (see Ruby characters).

=== Example ===
Below is an example for the word "bottle" (pinyin: píngzi):

瓶 / ㄆ ㄧ ㄥˊ; 子 / ˙ ㄗ	,	瓶 / ㄆ ㄧ ㄥˊ / 子 / ˙ ㄗ	or	ㄆㄧㄥˊ / ˙ㄗ; 瓶 / 子

=== Erhua transcription ===
Words rhotacized as a result of erhua are spelled with ㄦ attached to the syllable (like 歌兒(ㄍㄜㄦ) gēr). In case the syllable uses other tones than the 1st tone, the tone mark is attached to the penultimate letter standing for syllable nucleus, but not to ㄦ (e.g. 哪兒(ㄋㄚˇㄦ) nǎr; 一(ㄧ)點兒(ㄉㄧㄢˇㄦ) yīdiǎnr; 好(ㄏㄠˇ)玩兒(ㄨㄢˊㄦ) hǎowánr).

== Comparison ==
=== Pinyin ===
Bopomofo and pinyin are based on the same Mandarin pronunciations; hence there is a one-to-one correspondence between the two systems:

IPA and pinyin counterparts of Bopomofo finals
		Rime													
			ㄚ	ㄛ	ㄜ	ㄝ	ㄞ	ㄟ	ㄠ	ㄡ	ㄢ	ㄣ	ㄤ	ㄥ	ㄦ
Medial		[ɨ] (ㄭ) (Note: Not written.) -i	[a] ㄚ a -a	[o] ㄛ (Note: ⟨ㄨㄛ⟩/⟨-uo⟩ is written as ⟨ㄛ⟩/⟨-o⟩ after ⟨ㄅ⟩/⟨b-⟩, ⟨ㄆ⟩/⟨p-⟩, ⟨ㄇ⟩/⟨m-⟩, ⟨ㄈ⟩/⟨f-⟩.) o -o	[ɤ] ㄜ e -e	[ɛ] ㄝ ê	[ai̯] ㄞ ai -ai	[ei̯] ㄟ ei -ei	[ɑu̯] ㄠ ao -ao	[ou̯] ㄡ ou -ou	[an] ㄢ an -an	[ən] ㄣ en -en	[ɑŋ] ㄤ ang -ang	[ɤŋ] ㄥ eng -eng	[aɚ] ㄦ er
Medial	ㄧ	[i] ㄧ yi -i	[i̯a] ㄧㄚ ya -ia	[i̯o] ㄧㄛ yo		[i̯ɛ] ㄧㄝ ye -ie	[i̯ai̯] ㄧㄞ yai		[i̯ɑu̯] ㄧㄠ yao -iao	[i̯ou̯] ㄧㄡ you -iu	[i̯ɛn] ㄧㄢ yan -ian	[in] ㄧㄣ yin -in	[i̯ɑŋ] ㄧㄤ yang -iang	[iŋ] ㄧㄥ ying -ing	
Medial	ㄨ	[u] ㄨ wu -u	[u̯a] ㄨㄚ wa -ua	[u̯o] ㄨㄛ wo -uo			[u̯ai̯] ㄨㄞ wai -uai	[u̯ei̯] ㄨㄟ wei -ui			[u̯an] ㄨㄢ wan -uan	[u̯ən] ㄨㄣ wen -un	[u̯ɑŋ] ㄨㄤ wang -uang	[u̯ɤŋ], [ʊŋ] ㄨㄥ weng -ong (Note: ⟨weng⟩ is pronounced [ʊŋ] (written as ⟨-ong⟩) when it follows an initial.)	
Medial	ㄩ	[y] ㄩ yu -ü (Note: ⟨-ü⟩ is written as ⟨-u⟩ after ⟨j-⟩, ⟨q-⟩, ⟨x-⟩, or ⟨y-⟩.)				[y̯ɛ] ㄩㄝ yue -üe					[y̯ɛn] ㄩㄢ yuan -üan	[yn] ㄩㄣ yun -ün		[i̯ʊŋ] ㄩㄥ yong -iong	

=== Chart ===
Vowels a, e, o
IPA	a	ɔ	ɛ	ɤ	ai	ei	au	ou	an	ən	aŋ	əŋ	ʊŋ	aɹ
Pinyin	a	o	ê	e	ai	ei	ao	ou	an	en	ang	eng	ong	er
Tongyong Pinyin	a	o	ê	e	ai	ei	ao	ou	an	en	ang	eng	ong	er
Wade–Giles	a	o	eh	ê/o	ai	ei	ao	ou	an	ên	ang	êng	ung	êrh
Bopomofo	ㄚ	ㄛ	ㄝ	ㄜ	ㄞ	ㄟ	ㄠ	ㄡ	ㄢ	ㄣ	ㄤ	ㄥ	ㄨㄥ	ㄦ
example	阿	喔	誒	俄	艾	黑	凹	偶	安	恩	昂	冷	中	二

Vowels i, u, y
IPA	i	je	jou	jɛn	in	iŋ	jʊŋ	u	wo	wei	wən	wəŋ	y	ɥe	ɥɛn	yn
Pinyin	yi	ye	you	yan	yin	ying	yong	wu	wo/o	wei	wen	weng	yu	yue	yuan	yun
Tongyong Pinyin	yi	ye	you	yan	yin	ying	yong	wu	wo/o	wei	wun	wong	yu	yue	yuan	yun
Wade–Giles	i/yi	yeh	yu	yen	yin	ying	yung	wu	wo/o	wei	wên	wêng	yü	yüeh	yüan	yün
Bopomofo	ㄧ	ㄧㄝ	ㄧㄡ	ㄧㄢ	ㄧㄣ	ㄧㄥ	ㄩㄥ	ㄨ	ㄨㄛ/ㄛ	ㄨㄟ	ㄨㄣ	ㄨㄥ	ㄩ	ㄩㄝ	ㄩㄢ	ㄩㄣ
example	一	也	又	言	音	英	用	五	我	位	文	翁	玉	月	元	雲

Non-sibilant consonants
IPA	p	pʰ	m	fəŋ	tjou	twei	twən	tʰɤ	ny	ly	kɤ	kʰɤ	xɤ
Pinyin	b	p	m	feng	diu	dui	dun	te	nü	lü	ge	ke	he
Tongyong Pinyin	b	p	m	fong	diou	duei	dun	te	nyu	lyu	ge	ke	he
Wade–Giles	p	pʻ	m	fêng	tiu	tui	tun	tʻê	nü	lü	ko	kʻo	ho
Bopomofo	ㄅ	ㄆ	ㄇ	ㄈㄥ	ㄉㄧㄡ	ㄉㄨㄟ	ㄉㄨㄣ	ㄊㄜ	ㄋㄩ	ㄌㄩ	ㄍㄜ	ㄎㄜ	ㄏㄜ
example	玻	婆	末	封	丟	兌	頓	特	女	旅	歌	可	何

Sibilant consonants
IPA	tɕjɛn	tɕjʊŋ	tɕʰin	ɕɥɛn	ʈʂɤ	ʈʂɨ	ʈʂʰɤ	ʈʂʰɨ	ʂɤ	ʂɨ	ɻɤ	ɻɨ	tsɤ	tswo	tsɨ	tsʰɤ	tsʰwo	tsʰɨ	sɤ	swo	sɨ
Pinyin	jian	jiong	qin	xuan	zhe	zhi	che	chi	she	shi	re	ri	ze	zuo	zi	ce	cuo	ci	se	suo	si
Tongyong Pinyin	jian	jyong	cin	syuan	jhe	jhih	che	chih	she	shih	re	rih	ze	zuo	zih	ce	cuo	cih	se	suo	sih
Wade–Giles	chien	chiung	chʻin	hsüan	chê	chih	chʻê	chʻih	shê	shih	jê	jih	tsê	tso	tzŭ	tsʻê	tsʻo	tzʻŭ	sê	so	ssŭ
Bopomofo	ㄐㄧㄢ	ㄐㄩㄥ	ㄑㄧㄣ	ㄒㄩㄢ	ㄓㄜ	ㄓ	ㄔㄜ	ㄔ	ㄕㄜ	ㄕ	ㄖㄜ	ㄖ	ㄗㄜ	ㄗㄨㄛ	ㄗ	ㄘㄜ	ㄘㄨㄛ	ㄘ	ㄙㄜ	ㄙㄨㄛ	ㄙ
example	件	囧	秦	宣	哲	之	扯	赤	社	是	惹	日	仄	左	字	策	撮	次	色	索	斯

Tones
IPA	ma˥	ma˧˥	ma˨˩˦	ma˥˩	ma
Pinyin	mā	má	mǎ	mà	ma
Tongyong Pinyin	ma	má	mǎ	mà	må
Wade–Giles	ma^{1}	ma^{2}	ma^{3}	ma^{4}	ma
Bopomofo	ㄇㄚ	ㄇㄚˊ	ㄇㄚˇ	ㄇㄚˋ	˙ㄇㄚ
example (Chinese characters)	媽	麻	馬	罵	嗎

== Use outside Standard Mandarin ==
Bopomofo symbols for non-Mandarin Chinese varieties are added to Unicode in the Bopomofo Extended block.

Three letters no longer used for Mandarin are carried over from Old National Pronunciation:

Bopomofo	IPA	GR	Pinyin
ㄪ	v	v	v
ㄫ	ŋ	ng	ng
ㄬ	ɲ	gn	gn

=== Taiwanese Hokkien ===
In Taiwan, Bopomofo is used to teach Taiwanese Hokkien, and it is also used to transcribe it phonetically in contexts such as on storefront signs, karaoke lyrics, and film subtitles.

23 more letters were added specifically for Taiwanese Hokkien:

Bopomofo	IPA	TL	Derivation
ㆠ	b	b	ㄅ with voicing circle
ㆣ	g	g	ㄍ with voicing circle
ㆢ	d͡ʑ	ji	ㄐ with voicing circle
ㆡ	d͡z	j	ㄗ with voicing circle
ㆨ	ɨ	ir	ㄨ and ㄧ combined (?)
ㆦ	ɔ	oo	from ㄛ
ㆤ	e	e	from ㄝ
ㆩ	ã	ann	ㄚ with nasal curl
ㆧ	ɔ̃	onn	ㆦ with nasal curl
ㆥ	ẽ	enn	ㆤ with nasal curl
ㆪ/ㆳ	ĩ	inn	ㄧ with nasal curl
ㆫ	ũ	unn	ㄨ with nasal curl
ㆮ	ãĩ	ainn	ㄞ with nasal curl
ㆯ	ãũ	aunn	ㄠ with nasal curl
ㆰ	am	am	ㄚ and ㄇ combined
ㆱ	ɔm	om	ㆦ and ㄇ combined
ㆲ	ɔŋ	ong	
ㆬ	m̩	m	ㄇ with syllabic stroke
ㆭ	ŋ̍	ng	ㄫ with syllabic stroke
ㆴ	-p̚	-p	small ㄅ
ㆵ	-t̚	-t	small ㄉ
ㆻ/ㆶ	-k̚	-k	small ㄍ (and variant small ㄎ)
ㆷ	-ʔ	-h	small ㄏ

Two tone marks were added for the additional tones: ˪, ˫

=== Cantonese ===
The following letters are used in Cantonese.

Bopomofo	IPA	Jyutping
ㆼ	kʷ	gw
ㆽ	kʷʰ	kw
ㆾ	ɵ	eo
ㆿ	ɐ	a

If a syllable ends with a consonant other than -an or -aan, the consonant's letter is added, then followed by a final middle dot.

-ㄞ is used for [aːi] (aai) (e.g. 敗, ㄅㄞ baai6, "to be defeated").

-ㄣ is used for [ɐn] (an) (e.g. 跟, ㄍㄣ gan1, "to follow"), and -ㄢ is used for [aːn] (aan) (e.g. 間, ㄍㄢ gaan1, "within"). Other vowels that end with -n use -ㄋ· for the final ㄋ. (e.g. 見, ㄍㄧㄋ· gin3, "to see").

-ㄡ is used for [ɐu] (au). (e.g. 牛, ㄫㄡ, ngau4, "cow") To transcribe [ou] (ou), it is written as ㄛㄨ (e.g. 路, ㄌㄛㄨ lou6, "path").

ㄫ is used for both initial ng- (as in 牛, ㄫㄡ, ngau4) and final -ng (as in 用, ㄧㄛㄫ·, jung^{6} "to use").

ㄐ is used for [t͡s] (z) (e.g. 煑, ㄐㄩ zyu2, "to cook") and ㄑ is used for [t͡sʰ] (c) (e.g. 全, ㄑㄩㄋ· cyun4, "whole").

During the time when Bopomofo was proposed for Cantonese, tones were not marked.

== Computer uses ==
=== Input method ===
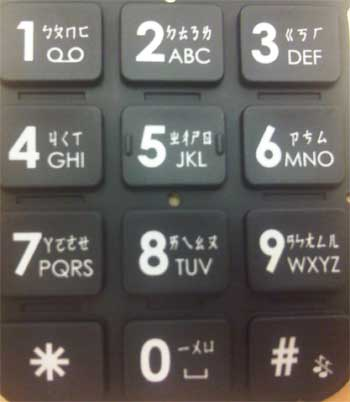
An example of a Bopomofo keypad for Taiwan

A typical keyboard layout for Bopomofo on computers

Bopomofo can be used as an input method for Chinese characters. It is one of the few input methods that can be found on most modern personal computers without having to download or install any additional software. It is also one of the few input methods that can be used for inputting Chinese characters on certain cell phones.. On the QWERTY keyboard, the symbols are ordered column-wise top-down (e.g. 8+I+K+,)

=== Unicode ===
Bopomofo was added to the Unicode Standard in October 1991 with the release of version 1.0.

The Unicode block for Bopomofo is U+3100–U+312F:

Bopomofo^{[1]}^{[2]} Official Unicode Consortium code chart (PDF)
	0	1	2	3	4	5	6	7	8	9	A	B	C	D	E	F
U+310x						ㄅ	ㄆ	ㄇ	ㄈ	ㄉ	ㄊ	ㄋ	ㄌ	ㄍ	ㄎ	ㄏ
U+311x	ㄐ	ㄑ	ㄒ	ㄓ	ㄔ	ㄕ	ㄖ	ㄗ	ㄘ	ㄙ	ㄚ	ㄛ	ㄜ	ㄝ	ㄞ	ㄟ
U+312x	ㄠ	ㄡ	ㄢ	ㄣ	ㄤ	ㄥ	ㄦ	ㄧ	ㄨ	ㄩ	ㄪ	ㄫ	ㄬ	ㄭ	ㄮ	ㄯ
Notes 1.As of Unicode version 18.0 2.Grey areas indicate non-assigned code points

Additional characters were added in September 1999 with the release of version 3.0.

The Unicode block for these additional characters, called Bopomofo Extended, is U+31A0–U+31BF:

Bopomofo Extended^{[1]} Official Unicode Consortium code chart (PDF)
	0	1	2	3	4	5	6	7	8	9	A	B	C	D	E	F
U+31Ax	ㆠ	ㆡ	ㆢ	ㆣ	ㆤ	ㆥ	ㆦ	ㆧ	ㆨ	ㆩ	ㆪ	ㆫ	ㆬ	ㆭ	ㆮ	ㆯ
U+31Bx	ㆰ	ㆱ	ㆲ	ㆳ	ㆴ	ㆵ	ㆶ	ㆷ	ㆸ	ㆹ	ㆺ	ㆻ	ㆼ	ㆽ	ㆾ	ㆿ
Notes 1.As of Unicode version 18.0

Unicode 3.0 also added the characters U+02EA ˪ MODIFIER LETTER YIN DEPARTING TONE MARK and U+02EB ˫ MODIFIER LETTER YANG DEPARTING TONE MARK, in the Spacing Modifier Letters block. These two characters are now (since Unicode 6.0) classified as Bopomofo characters.

Tonal marks for bopomofo Spacing Modifier Letters
Tone	Tone Marker	Unicode	Note
1 Yin Ping (Level)	ˉ	U+02C9	Usually omitted
2 Yang Ping (Level)	ˊ	U+02CA	
3 Shang (Rising)	ˇ	U+02C7	
4 Qu (Departing)	ˋ	U+02CB	
4a Yin Qu (Departing)	˪	U+02EA	For Minnan and Hakka languages
4b Yang Qu (Departing)	˫	U+02EB	For Minnan and Hakka languages
5 Qing (Neutral)	˙	U+02D9	

== See also ==
- Chinese input methods for computers
- Fanqie
- Furigana
- Hangul
- Kana
- Ruby character
- Taiwanese Phonetic Symbols
- Zhuyin table
