= Matsu Daily =

State-owned newspaper in Taiwan

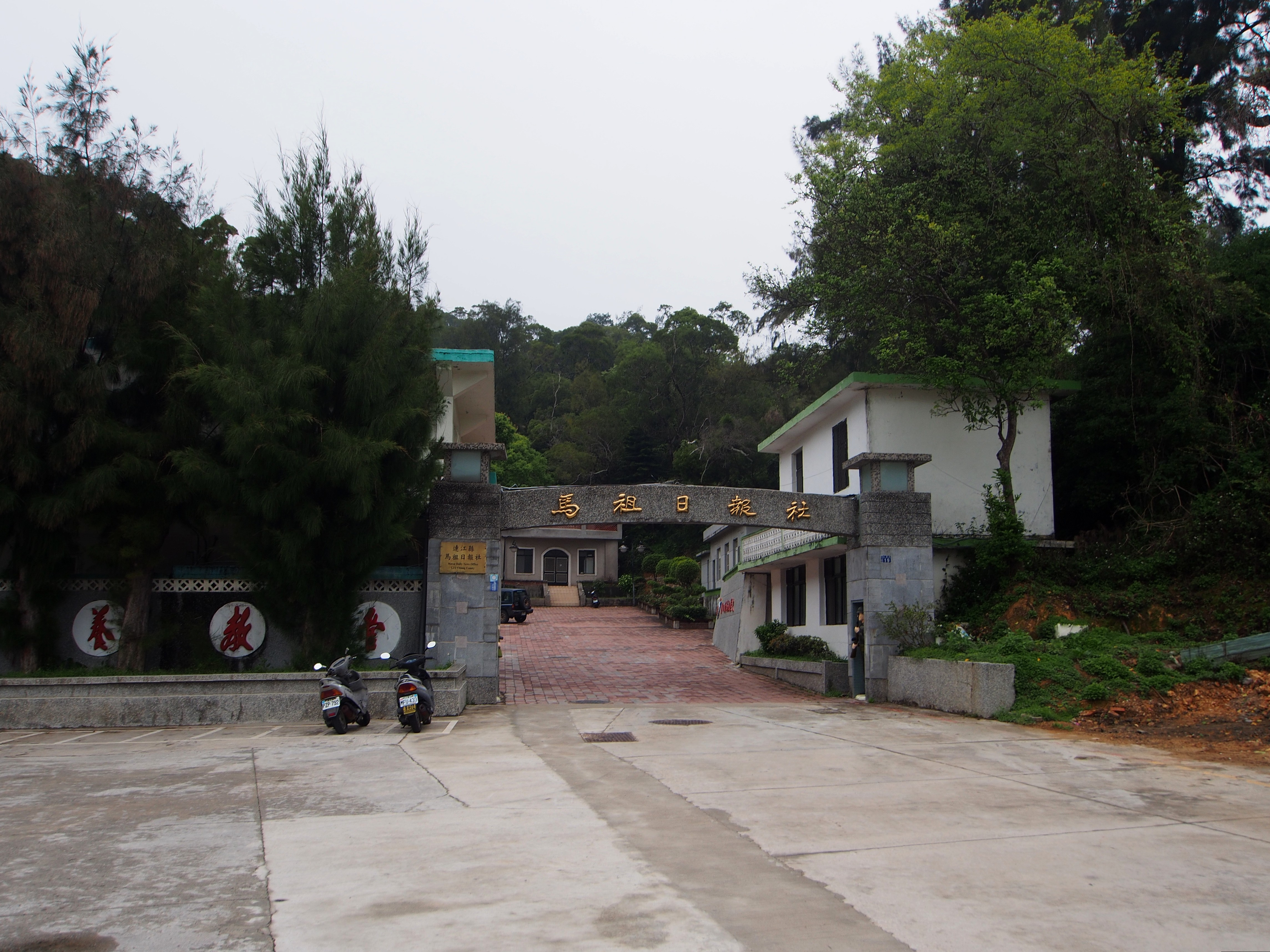
- Owner: Lienchiang County Government
- Founded: 3 September 1957 (68 years ago)
- City: Matsu Islands
- Website: matsu-news.gov.tw

Matsu Daily
- Traditional Chinese: 馬祖日報
Transcriptions
Standard Mandarin
- Hanyu Pinyin: Mǎzǔ Rìbào
- Wade–Giles: Ma3-tsu3 Jih4-pao4
Southern Min
- Hokkien POJ: Má-chó͘-ji̍t-pò

Matsu Daily (Chinese: 馬祖日報; pinyin: Mǎzǔ Rìbào; Wade–Giles: ma^{3}-tsu^{3} jih^{4}-pao^{4}) is a newspaper owned by the government of the Lienchiang County, Fuchien Province, Republic of China (Taiwan).

It was founded as Tengpu Daily (Chinese: 登步報; pinyin: Dēngbù Bào; Wade–Giles: teng^{1}-pu^{4} pao^{4}), a newspaper published to the military on Tengpu Island, to commemorate the victory of Tengpu Battle. Following the later retreat to Matsu, the newspaper continued to be published. Matsu Daily started to be published on 3 September 1957.

The ownership of the newspaper was transferred from the military to the county government in 1992. The online version was launched in 1999.

== See also ==
- Media of Taiwan
- Kinmen Daily News
