= Youth Daily News =

Newspaper based in Taiwan

Youth Daily
- Type: Daily, print and online
- Format: Tabloid
- Owner: Government of the Republic of China
- Publisher: Ministry of National Defense
- Founded: 1952
- Language: Chinese Mandarin, Taiwan Mandarin
- Headquarters: Zhongzheng District., Taipei City, Taiwan
- Website: www.ydn.com.tw

Youth Daily News (Chinese: 青年日報) is a daily newspaper published in Taiwan. It was founded in 1952 by the Ministry of National Defense's Political Warfare Bureau as Young Warrior Daily (青年戰士報). The newspaper is published by the

The authors Su Sheng-hsiung and Fu Hsing-fu studied how the Youth Warrior Daily reported on Taiwan's democracy movement. The academic Tsou Chung-hui studied how Youth Daily News reported on the Republic of China Armed Forces while China's conducted military drills in March 1996 during the Third Taiwan Strait Crisis.
