= Taiwan Journal =

English-language newspaper in Taiwan

- Free China Weekly scan, issue November 15, 1970
- Format: Broadsheet
- Publisher: China Publishing Company
- Editor: Government Information Office
- Founded: March 1, 1964
- Ceased publication: May 22, 2019
- Country: Republic of China
- Price: Unknown at Taipei; Free abroad

The Taiwan Journal (Chinese: 台灣紀事報; pinyin: Táiwān Jìshìbào) was an English-language weekly newspaper published by the Government Information Office of the Republic of China (Taiwan). The newspaper, with both print and online editions, was published every Friday, 51 issues per year (no publication during the Lunar New Year week), with National Day and occasional special editions.

The weekly ceased publication May 22, 2009, and was relaunched June 1, 2009, as Taiwan Today, an English-language news portal. Instead of weekly postings, the new site includes daily updates of 12 political, economic, social and cultural news stories Monday through Friday ("In the News"); photos of the day ("Snapshots"); as well as weekly opinion pieces and features offering analyses and reports on current affairs ("Opinion" and "Features").

== History ==
Founded as the Free China Weekly on March 1, 1964, the newspaper was renamed the Free China Journal on January 1, 1984, Taipei Journal on January 7, 2000, and changed to its present name in March 2003. The newspaper was changed, for a period of time, to a semi–weekly format, from July 4, 1988, to June 18, 1993.

== Content ==
The eight-page newspaper, publishing an average of 15 articles weekly, covers Taiwan-related international news, national news, and economic news. It also features an editorial, opinion and political cartoon page, a critical issues page, as well as society, arts and culture, and industry pages. The newspaper offers accounts on national policies, and the government's stance on national and international affairs.

== Readership ==
Taiwan Journal is published simultaneously in Taipei and Los Angeles once each week. With a circulation of 16,000 print copies, this newspaper reaches to more than 160 countries and territories around the globe, including some 5,000 copies in the United States alone. The newspaper's audience includes members of the mass media, government institutions, political circles, academic research institutes, university libraries, and the business sector.

== See also ==
- Taiwan Review
- Taiwan Info
- Taiwan Panorama
- Radio Taiwan International
