= Golden Bell Awards: 1970–1979 winners list =

This page lists the Golden Bell Award winners from 1970 to 1979.

== 1970 (6th Golden Bell Awards) ==
Award	Winner	Network
General Awards
Best News Program: Excellence Awards:	News Highlights: Taped reports; 金門行; 遺暉永在	Founding Broadcasting Ltd.: Army Corps Guoguang military broadcasting station; Zhenhua Broadcasting Corporation; Broadcasting Corporation of China - Tainan
Best News Commentary Program: Excellence Awards:	News Forum: 匪情分析座談會; Monthly Forum; 就事論事	Feng Ming Radio: Revival Radio; Broadcasting Corporation of China - Tainan; Police Broadcasting Service
Best Teaching Program Award: Excellence Awards:	Army Dawn: Our garden; Corner Church and State; 軍歌教唱	Radio Voice of Justice: Army Corps Penghu Army Radio Broadcasting; Army Corps Taipei Army Radio Broadcasting; Army Corps Guoguang military broadcasting station
Best Family Program Award: Excellence Awards:	幸福家庭劇場－夫婦四四二: Family Times; 我們的家庭－愛的蓓蕾; Women's magazine	Yi Shi Radio: Radio Voice of Victory; 幼獅廣播電台; Police Broadcasting Service
Best Children Program Award: Excellence Awards:	Kids' Time: 星期兒童時間; Children's World; Poster child	Broadcasting Corporation of China: Army Corps Taipei Army Radio Broadcasting; Broadcasting Corporation of China - Kaohsiung; Acoustic Radio
Best Music Program Award: Excellence Awards:	Revival Radio: 尋人服務; 幼獅天地; Fishermen time	桃園夜譚: Police Broadcasting Service; 幼獅廣播電台; Broadcasting Corporation of China - Kaohsiung
Best Music Award: Excellence Awards:	Air Dynasty; 音樂會剪輯; Music Bouquet	Revival Radio; Broadcasting Corporation of China - Tainan Joint; Army Corps Taipei Army Radio Broadcasting
Best Drama Program Award: Excellence Awards:	Love and Respect: 國恩家慶; Shore Storm; Pay the price for justice	Army Corps Taoyuan Army Radio Broadcasting: Air Force Radio; Revival Radio; Fengming Radio
Best Comprehensive Cultural Program Award: Excellence Awards:	Fuxing Broadcasting Station: 平劇欣賞; The Voice of Local; Chinese Culture Corner	Air Supplement: Police Broadcasting Service; Taipei Broadcasting Station; Broadcasting Corporation of China - Tainan
Best Entertainment Program Award: Excellence Awards:	Talk and Sing: Warm family; Voice of Police; Air Cabaret	Taipei Broadcasting Station: Army Corps Guoguang military broadcasting station; Police Broadcasting Service Kaohsiung Taiwan; Police Broadcasting Service
Best Advertising Program Award Excellence Awards:	Domestics window; Vientiane Hall; Majestic Time	Fengming Radio; Fengming Radio; People Radio
Individual Awards
Best Editor Award: Excellence Awards:	郭婉華 - 翠堤春曉: Cai, 好 - News Highlights; Tang, Ji - Love and Respect; Shen, Jing - Army dawn	民本廣播電台: Jianguo Broadcasting Limited; Army Corps Taoyuan Army Radio Broadcasting; Army Corps Hualien Army Radio Broadcasting
Best Director Award: Excellence Awards:	鄭慶龍 - 巧奪天工: Tang, Ji - Stepfather; Feng Kui Reng - 桃園夜譚; Jin Peikai - 三結合	Broadcasting Corporation of China 嘉義廣播電台: Army Corps Taipei Army Radio Broadcasting; Army Corps Taoyuan Army Radio Broadcasting; Central Broadcasting System
Best Interview Award: Excellence Awards: Special Award:	李伯元 - 金門行: Cai, 好; 曹惠美 - Family Planning; Wang Mei Juan - News Feature; 涂裔輝 - 馬思聰的心	震華廣播股份有限公司: (Award not given after receiving "Editor Award"); Broadcasting Corporation of China - Taiwan; Air Force Radio
Best Broadcast Award: Excellence Awards:	蔡麗蓉（李娟） - 政教園地: Wang Yun Bao, 錢測雲, Qian Shi Ji, Chen Xiaojun - News Archives; Gengzhen Huan - 新聞報導; Yanghui Lan (Liu Qing) - Liu Qing time	Army Corps Taipei Army Radio Broadcasting: Central Broadcasting System; Broadcasting Corporation of China - Taitung; Broadcasting Corporation of China - Taitung
Broadcast in Mainland
Best News Program Award: Excellence Awards:	News Feature: Taped Records; Brood; News Feature	Air Force Radio: Central Broadcasting System; Radio Voice of Justice; Army Corps Penghu Army Radio Broadcasting
Best News Commentary Program	對中共空軍談話: Think; 請聽聽和你們不同的意見; 一週評論	Air Force Radio: Central Broadcasting System; Guanghua Radio; Radio Voice of Justice
Best Comprehensive Cultural Program	Central Radio: Arts World; Frontier situation; Red Hate	對口相聲: Army Corps Hualien Army Radio Broadcasting; Central Broadcasting System; Guanghua Radio
Best Specific Program: Excellence Awards:	和工農朋友談天: Iron Curtain Nocturne; Continental Reconstruction; Guanghua Radio	Radio Voice of Justice: Guanghua Radio; Central Broadcasting System; 剝毛澤東的畫皮

== 1971 (7th Golden Bell Awards) ==
Award	Winner	Network
Radio and Television Program Excellence Awards
News and Current Affairs Commentary Programs
Best Broadcast Award: Excellence Awards:	花蓮特寫: World Expo opening ceremony live; News Feature; News Feature; 山胞賽夏族矮人祭; 端正社會風氣 請從國語歌曲著手; 勤勞教民強 節約教民富; 就事論事	Broadcasting Corporation of China: Broadcasting Corporation of China; Broadcasting Corporation of China; 幼獅廣播電台; 台聲廣播電台; Taipei Broadcasting Station; Broadcasting Corporation of China; Police Broadcasting Service
Best Television Program Award: Excellence Award:	釣魚台列嶼巡禮	China Television Company
Education and Cultural Programs
Best Broadcast Award: Excellence Awards:	Morning in the Park: Youth Clubs; Scientific Knowledge; Chinese People's Stories; Talk and Sing; Happy family; The Door to Victory; Happy Song	Broadcasting Corporation of China: 苗栗復興廣播電台; 基隆復興廣播電台; Fu Xing Gang Radio; Taipei Broadcasting Station; Cheng Sheng Broadcasting Corporation; Air Force Radio; BBC Sound of Victory
Best Television Program Award: Excellence Award:	Quiet Metropolis	China Television Company
Arts and Entertainment Program
Best Television Program: Excellence Award	Jubilee	Chinese television company
Best Broadcast Award: Excellence Awards:	Air Dynasty: World of Music; 一二三俱樂部; Music Wind; 父親大人; Music Appreciation; Local Scenery; Folk Art	Police Broadcasting Service: Revival Radio - Taitung; Guanghua Radio; Broadcasting Corporation of China; Feng Ming Radio; Army Corps left camp military broadcasting station; China Radio Broadcasting Corporation Taitung; Cheng Sheng Broadcasting Corporation radio station in Kaohsiung
Best Innovative Program Award: Excellence Awards:	Guo Wanhua - My Wish: 逯 - Sound Classroom; 拾景伸 - 上下五千年; Li Ji Wen - Red Bridge; 錢測雲 - Hunters; Qi Zhi Ping - 大哉中華; Zhang Chu - Bedtime Stories; 胡覺海 - 一聽就會; 張遵禮 - 毛朝外傳; Li Bo Quan - Broadcast Modern Theater; Zhai Shi Chun - Meilun Yamashita	People Radio: Taipei Broadcasting Station; Army Corps Guoguang radio broadcasting; Air Force Radio; Taipei Broadcasting Station; Broadcasting Corporation of China - Taiwan; Taipei Broadcasting Station; Army Corps Taipei Army Radio Broadcasting; Central Broadcasting System; Feng Ming Radio; Broadcasting Corporation of China in Hualien
Individual Awards
Editor Award	潘寧東 - Music Tour 李鳳行 - Folk art Chen Qi - 華夏笙歌	Broadcasting Corporation of China; Cheng Sheng Broadcasting Corporation radio station in Kaohsiung; Broadcasting Corporation of China
Broadcast Award	Liu Yu Jing - Ping Tung Online; Yu Guifang - Banditry Review 谷 禎 臺益公 - 對大陸廣播新聞特寫	Army Corps Kaohsiung Army Radio Broadcasting; Revival Radio - Keelung; Army Corps Penghu Army Radio Broadcasting
Best Dubbing Award	賁秉綱 - 音響教室	Taipei Broadcasting Station
Children's Program Special Award	Zheng Yaru - Children's Song	Broadcasting Corporation of China - Chiayi

== 1972 (8th Golden Bell Awards) ==
Award	Winner	Network
Broadcast Excellence Awards
News and Current Affairs Commentary Programs
Best Broadcast Award Excellence Awards:	Taped reports: News (Typhoon News); 財經報導（退出聯合國對我經濟發展是否構成重大妨礙？）; News Feature (free Shining Path); Memorable On October 26; News Feature(今天我們退出了聯合國); News commentary (論毛匪澤東整肅林匪彪的問題); Fuxinggang Commentary (評我們退出聯合國之後)	Army Corps Guoguang radio broadcasting: Police Broadcasting Service; Broadcasting Corporation of China; Army Corps Penghu military broadcasting radio stations; Broadcasting Corporation of China Ilan; Broadcasting Corporation of China Tainan; Radio Voice of Guanghua Guanghua; Xing Gang Radio
Education and Cultural Program
Best Broadcast Award Excellence Awards:	Chinese people's stories: 中國人的故事; Our family - descendants; 歌謠集錦－西藏民謠; Corner Church and State; 共匪暴行資料及大陸反共革命事蹟展覽特別報導; 圓山夜曲	Fuxing Broadcasting Station: Acoustic Radio; Broadcasting Corporation of China; Revival Radio; Army Corps Taipei army broadcast radio; Broadcasting Corporation of China - Hualien; Taipei Broadcasting Station
Arts and Entertainment Program
Best Broadcast Award Excellence Awards:	Frontline Warrior Club; Meilun Yamashita: 「我愛國旗」連續劇(六)－血染國旗; 空中劇場－萬壽橋; Children's playground; 談古說今; Jianqiao Club; 反毛同心會-	Radio Voice of the Golden Gate Guanghua; Broadcasting Corporation of China - Hualien: Army Corps Army China Light Broadcast Radio; Cheng Sheng Broadcasting Corporation - Taipei; Broadcasting Corporation of China - Chiayi; Army Corps broadcasting radio station in Hualien Army; Air radio stations; Radio Voice of Matsu Guanghua
Individual Awards
Best Editor Award	Zhao Qin - Music Tour; Bai Jie - Frontline Warrior Club	Broadcasting Corporation of China; Radio Voice of the Golden Gate Guanghua
Best Choreographer Award	Zhouqiao Yun - Teaching and learning	Broadcasting Corporation of China Chiayi
Best Editorial Award	Mouxi Zong - Taped reports Panning Dong - 共匪暴行資料及大陸反共革命事蹟展覽特別報導	Army Corps Army China Light Broadcast Radio; Broadcasting Corporation of China Hualien
Best Interview Award	莫迺滇 臺益公 - 一個新的反共國家－高棉共和國	China Television Company
Best Broadcast Award	Feng Xiangyun - Meilun Yamashita	Broadcasting Corporation of China Hualien
TV / Innovation Excellence Awards
News and Current Affairs Commentary Program
Best Television Program Award Excellence Awards:	Glorious Giants - 衛星轉播巨人少棒隊勇奪一九七一年世界少棒冠軍實況: 一個新的反共國家－高棉共和國; Today closeup - year-old orphan spring cold probe	China Television Company: China Television Company; China Television
Education and Cultural Program
Best Television Program Award Excellence Award:	得獎節目: High school biology	Broadcasting Corporation of China: China Television
Arts and Entertainment Program
Best Award Excellence Award:	Changbai Mountain: Poison duck	China Television Company: China Television
Innovative Program Award
Best Television Program Award	Hua Huiying - Dragon; Zhai Shi Chun - Heroes OK 鍾能基 - 新型廣播劇《雨過天晴》 任 俊 - The dawn of victory Jiang Wei - Telephone tired brain Zhao Qin - Music Tour; Cai Shifa - Telephone kiosks Qi Zhiping - History of the melody Xiao Baocheng - 生死駌鴦; Jiang Guobin - Peasants and soldiers sing counterparts Lin Shuzhen - Flowers of love	China Television; Police Broadcasting Service; Army Corps Taipei army broadcast radio Army Corps Taipei army broadcast radio Police Broadcasting Service; Broadcasting Corporation of China; Cheng Sheng Broadcasting Corporation radio stations in Chiayi electricity Broadcasting Corporation of China - Tainan; Revival Radio - Taichung; Radio Voice of Guanghua Guanghua; Yunlin Cheng Sheng Broadcasting Corporation Radio

== 1973 (9th Golden Bell Awards) ==
Award	Winner	Network
Broadcast Excellence Awards
News and Current Affairs Commentary Program
Best Broadcast Award Excellence Awards:	華僑之家: Interview Coverage; Hualien closeup; Taiwan News; 臺灣報導; 就事論事; 我們的看法–淨化電視廣告，促進純正節目	Radio Voice of Justice: Yunlin Cheng Sheng Broadcasting Corporation Radio; Broadcasting Corporation of China - Hualien; Guanghua Radio; Broadcasting Corporation of China - Chiayi; Police Radio Station; Army Corps Guoguang military broadcasting station
Education and Cultural Program
Best Broadcast Award Excellence Awards:	說說唱唱–貫徹十項革新指示: 錦繡河山–談大陸年俗; Beautiful Country; 自強之路; Chinese Culture Corner; Morning melodies; Favorite melodies	Taipei Broadcasting Station: Fuxing Broadcasting Station; BBC Sound of Victory; Army Corps Penghu Army Radio Broadcasting; Broadcasting Corporation of China - Tainan; Fengming Radio; Broadcasting Corporation of China
Arts and Entertainment Program
Best Broadcast Award Excellence Awards:	彩虹曲: 生命之歌; Music Pearls of Wisdom; 九三俱樂部; 我為你歌唱; The Voice of Local; 晨間沙龍	Army Corps Taipei Army Radio Broadcasting: 幼獅廣播電臺; Taiwan Provincial Police Radio Station; Broadcasting Corporation of China; Cheng Sheng Broadcasting Corporation Taipei Broadcasting Station; Taipei Broadcasting Station; 成功廣播電臺
Special Program
Best Broadcast Award Excellence Awards:	反毛同心會: 對中共黨政軍人員廣播; 自由光明之路	Radio Voice of Matsu Guanghua: Guanghua Radio; Army Corps Penghu Army Radio Broadcasting
TV / Innovation Excellence Awards
News and Current Affairs Commentary Programs
Best Television Award Excellence Awards:	得獎節目: Jianggui Qin's story	China Television: China Television Company
Education and Cultural Programs
Best Television Award Excellence Awards:	這一年: Children's toys	Taiwan Television Enterprise: China Television Company
Popular Entertainment Programs
Best Television Award Excellence Awards:	Last forever: TTV Theatre; World Freedom Day party battle	China Television Company: Taiwan Television Enterprise; China Television
Innovation Program Award
Best Innovation Program Award Excellence Awards:	任 俊 - 對時插播: Yang Yuzhang - Today; Zhang Liang - 四海一家; West Wei Fang - Film Appreciation; Liu Youcheng - Iron Curtain fax; 劉偉達 - 大有為政府; 曹慕廷 - Gammon ShengJi; 管美綾 - 與我同行; 臺益公 - 超音速英雄; 潘健行 - 從電視看圖識字	Army Corps Taipei military broadcasting station: Taiwan Provincial Police Stations; Broadcasting Corporation of China; Taipei Broadcasting Station; Revival Radio; Broadcasting Corporation of China - Taitung; Radio Voice of the Golden Gate Guanghua; Cheng Sheng Broadcasting Corporation radio station in Taitung; China Television Company; China Television Company
Individual Awards
Best Production Award	Yellow Star - Singers Night 歸 來 - Morning melodies	Taiwan Television Enterprise; Fengming Radio
Best Choreographer Award	Shezhao Bo - A book of Revelation; Zhouqiao Yun - Daughter Circle	Broadcasting Corporation of China - Ilan; Broadcasting Corporation of China - Chiayi
Best Editor Award	Liao Hui - Favorite melodies	Broadcasting Corporation of China
Best Editorial Award	Panning Dong - Hualien closeup	Broadcasting Corporation of China - Hualien
Best Interview Award	Zhang Kishon - Pingtung online Wong Shun - Beautiful Country	Army Corps Kaohsiung Army Radio Broadcasting; Complex and Gang Radio

== 1974 (10th Golden Bell Awards) ==
Award	Winner	Network
Broadcast Excellence Awards
News and Current Affairs Commentary Program
Best Broadcast Award Excellence Awards:	美崙山下–深山裏的燈塔守護者: "Taiwan International Children's Village" Interview Chungli; Time of presentation - four in the book; China Kaohsiung - Happy Farm; Today Commentary - You say right; Chinese home	Broadcasting Corporation of China - Hualien: Revival Radio; Army Corps Guoguang broadcasting station; Taiwan Broadcasting Corporation; Taipei, Taiwan Cheng Sheng Broadcasting Corporation; Radio Voice of Justice
Education and Cultural Programs
Best Broadcast Award Excellence Awards:	Radio drama - Han Storm: Heartstrings song; South high club; Mountain Music Discussion; 文藝圈–天地一沙鷗; Taichung Transportation Professional program - rain melody	Broadcasting Corporation of China: BBC Sound of Victory; China Kaohsiung, Taiwan Broadcasting Corporation; Broadcasting Corporation of China - Taitung Taiwan; 幼獅廣播電臺; Broadcasting Corporation of China
Arts and Entertainment Programs
Best Broadcast Award Excellence Awards:	玉女歌壇: 幼獅俱樂部–民俗世界; Christmas Eve; 輕音樂欣賞; 迴瀾歌廳–阿美族和他們的歌曲	中國廣播公司: 幼獅廣播電臺; Police Radio Station; Army Corps Hualien Taiwan Broadcasting; Army Corps Hualien Taiwan Broadcasting; Broadcasting Corporation of China - Hualien
Special Awards
Best Broadcast Award Excellence Awards:	Youth create era: Red Hate; 想一想，比一比; 怎麼辦; Voice of Free China - Motherland Morning; 和工農朋友談天	Radio Voice of Justice: The Sound of Matsu Taiwan Guanghua; Air Force Radio; Radio Voice of Guanghua, Guanghua; Broadcasting Corporation of China (Overseas Broadcasting Department)
TV / Innovation Excellence Awards
Innovative Programs
Best Broadcast Award Excellence Awards:	Wen Yin - Ethnic melodies: Leopard Shenglin - Psychological warfare radio; Huang Tao - 金門我與你同在; Shezhao Bo - 我們從那裏來; Hu Desheng - 駕馭歷史、創造明天; 王柏鐺 - Taipei round the clock; Jiang Wei - 一把雨傘; 楊川增 - 晨鐘暮鼓	Broadcasting Corporation of China - Tainan: Revival Radio; Radio Voice of the Golden Gate Guanghua; Broadcasting Corporation of China - Ilan; Broadcasting Corporation of China; Cheng Sheng Broadcasting Corporation - Ilan; Police Radio Station; Air Force Radio
Innovative Programs
Best Broadcast Award	Wang Hsiao-hsiang - Courage to stand up Hua Huiying - 勇敢的站起來	China Television Company; China Television
Individual Awards
Best Production Award	Xu Yuan Yuan - 風雨同舟祝國慶，自強奮鬥興中華	Broadcasting Corporation of China - National General Assembly Special Coverage
Best Editing Award	Guoshou Qin - Red Hate	Radio Voice of Matsu Guanghua
Best Interview Award	Zhang Xiyao - Taiwan International Children's Village Interview	Revival Radio - Chungli
Best Director Award	Zhang Fan, Hou Ying, Xu - Radio drama "Han Feng Yun"; Gu Yingzhe - Galaxy Spin Palace	Qian China Broadcasting Corporation; Taiwan Television Enterprise
Best Broadcaster Award	于曼弟 - 心弦之歌 播音獎 - Radio Comments	BBC Sound of Victory; Minli Radio
Best Dubbing Award	Li Yuxiang	文藝圈–天地一沙鷗
TV / Advertising Awards
Excellent TV Awards News and Current Affairs Commentary Programs
Best Television Award Excellence Awards:	誓師再北伐，誓師再統一的會議: First Asian Athletics Championships Special Report; 新聞分析–談小康計劃	China Television Company: Taiwan Television Enterprise; Taiwan Television Enterprise
Education and Cultural Programs
Best Television Award Excellence Awards:	Happy Farm: 高中二年級國文; 英語入門–鵝媽媽教英語; 出版與讀書	Taiwan Television Enterprise: China Television; China Television; China Television Company
Popular Entertainment Programs
Best Television Award Special Award:	TTV theater - I love my teacher	Taiwan Television Enterprise: Taiwan Television Enterprise, China Television Company, China joint television broadcast
Advertising Awards
Best Radio Award Excellence Awards:	插播廣告–蕾斯夢高級化粧品; 插播廣告–家樂牌立體回聲道唱盤; 得獎節目	Acoustic Radio; BBC Sound of Victory; 得獎單位
Best TV Advertisement Award Excellence Awards:	優等獎; 中國傳統色彩篇; 嬰兒美奶粉（白鷺篇）; 理想牌流理臺（心願篇）; Sony TV	欣欣傳播事業股份有限公司; 達達電視電影公司; 大世紀事業股份有限公司; 達達電視電影公司; 創造企劃股份有限公司

== 1975 (11th Golden Bell Awards) ==
Award	Winner	Network
Broadcast Excellence Awards
News and Current Affairs Commentary Program
Best Broadcast Award Excellence Awards:	橫貫公路十五年: 台視新聞（慶祝 總統華誕專輯）; 三冠王的光輝	China Television: Taiwan Television Enterprise; China Television Company
Education and Cultural Program
Best Broadcast Award Excellence Awards:	藍天白雲（塘鵝篇）: Teachers philology; 五線譜; publishing and reading	Taiwan Television Enterprise: China Television; China Television; China Television
Popular Rntertainment Programs
Best Broadcast Award Excellence Awards:	Generation tyrant: 包青天; National Day special program "celebrate"	China Television Company: China Television; Taiwan Television Enterprise
Advertising Awards
Radio Advertising
Best Advertising Award Excellence Awards:	幸福牌身歷聲立體放音機: Ten Ren Tea; Mega Audio Time	Broadcasting Corporation of China - Hsinchu: Fengming Radio; Days of the South Radio
Television Advertising
Best Advertising Award Excellence Awards:	Acacia international brand air conditioners: Shiseido Honey Soap; Pine juice; Lengthy shampoo (a); Ideal brand color pot	Matsushita Electric Corporation of Taiwan: Shiseido Company in Taiwan; 創造企劃公司; Nanchow Chemical Industry Company; Dada TV movie Utilities Company Limited
Individual Awards
Best Production Award	Zheng Qinglong - Hsiao World 唐擴亨 - Chinese home	Broadcasting Corporation of China - Chiayi; Radio Voice of Justice
Best Editor Award	Chang Yan Zhou - Friends of the family Xu Huantang - 北管戲考	Revival Radio; Broadcasting Corporation of China - Miaoli
Best Interview Award	Li Baogan, Zhou Ling, Daniel Lee, Josh Zhang, Zhang Ying Zhen - Self-parade live (common interview) 柯仁愛 - Highway	Broadcasting Corporation of China - Taipei Broadcasting Station; Broadcasting Corporation of China - Taitung
Best Broadcast Award	于西清 - 模範兒童 胡覺海 - 西瀛走廊	Acoustic Radio; Penghu army radio
Best Acting Award	儀 銘 - 包青天]	China Television
Social Service Awards
Social Service Awards:	Great building (government propaganda); Happy Farm (social services}; Zhongxing Village (government propaganda); The road to victory (military education); Today (Social Services); Air Education (Social Services); Refuges (Social Services); Air Legal Adviser (Social Services); Morning in the park (government propaganda); Orchestra (pure creative promotional song); President Wang of the day (faith and love) (government propaganda); Agriculture program (social services); Fengming Gao (government propaganda)	Taiwan Television Enterprise; Taiwan Television Enterprise; China Television Company; China Television Company; China Television Company; China Television Company; Police Radio Station; Police Radio Station; Broadcasting Corporation of China; Broadcasting Corporation of China; Broadcasting Corporation of China - Taiwan; Taichung Taiwan Cheng Sheng Broadcasting Corporation; Fengming Radio
Television Excellence Awards
News and Current Affairs Commentary Programs
Best Broadcast Award Excellence Awards:	Royalton Yamashita - Midas touch: 華僑之家; Fuxinggang Commentary; This generation; 西瀛走廊; Today Commentary	Broadcasting Corporation of China - Hualien Taiwan: Radio Voice of Justice; Army Radio Fuxinggang; Broadcasting Corporation of China - Ilan Taiwan; Army Corps Penghu Taiwan Broadcasting; Taichung Taiwan Cheng Sheng Broadcasting Corporation
Education and Cultural Programs
Best Award Excellence Awards:	Hsiao World: Stone Park; 大圓環; Friends of Revival; Poster child; Aviation Hall	Broadcasting Corporation of China - Chiayi Taiwan: Broadcasting Corporation of China - Hualien Taiwan; Kaohsiung police radio; Revival Radio - Chungli; Acoustic Radio; Air Force Radio
Popular Entertainment Programs
Best Award Excellence Awards:	Music of the Psalms: Legendary Chunxiao (valley springs radio set drama); Music concert in Canton; 北管戲管; Country music time; 中廣樂府樂壇新秀; 迴瀾歌廳–阿美族和他們的歌曲	幼獅廣播電臺: Taipei, Taiwan Broadcasting Army Corps; Broadcasting Corporation of China; Chinese Miao Su Taiwan Broadcasting Corporation; Kaohsiung police radio; Broadcasting Corporation of China; Broadcasting Corporation of China - Hualien Taiwan
Special Awards
Special Awards Excellence Awards:	反毛同心會: 和工農朋友談天; 四海歸心; 留學生家信時間; 特定節目時間; Freedom Shining Path	Radio Voice of Matsu Guanghua: Radio Voice of Justice; Broadcasting Corporation of China - Overseas Department; Broadcasting Corporation of China - Overseas Department; Radio Voice of the Golden Gate Guanghua; Army Corps Taichung, Taiwan Broadcasting
Specific Special Awards
Awards:	Study three-dimensional black edges subtitles invented television broadcast technology; Suppress bandits broadcast, enhance psychological defense; Donations to help in advocating and promoting purification songs	China Television Company Engineering Department; Revival Radio; Lions Clubs International Federation of the Republic of China

== 1976 (12th Golden Bell Awards) ==
Award	Winner	Network
Broadcast Excellence Awards
News and Current Affairs Commentary Program
Best Broadcast Award Excellence Awards:	Government and the people: 挺立在風雨中的塑像; The Chinese people on the Baltic Sea; Love and faith; Today's Commentary; News radio	Broadcasting Corporation of China: Broadcasting Corporation of China - Chiayi, Taiwan; Broadcasting Corporation of China; Broadcasting Corporation of China - Taitung, Taiwan; Taipei, Taiwan Cheng Sheng Broadcasting Corporation; Army Corps Guoguang broadcasting station
Education and Cultural Programs
Best Broadcast Award Excellence Awards:	Eternal Giants: Heart Bridge; 一刻心聲－窄門的煩惱; 藝文夜話; Happy Children; Our garden	Taipei Broadcasting Station: Revival Radio - Chiayi; Broadcasting Corporation of China - Chiayi, Taiwan; Taipei Broadcasting Station; Broadcasting Corporation of China; Broadcasting Corporation of China - Taiwan
Popular Entertainment Programs
Best Broadcast Award Excellence Awards:	Music Appreciation: Talk and sing; China complains; Flowers of life; Air Supplements; 新瓶老酒話民謠	Army Corps of Kaohsiung, Taiwan Broadcasting: Taipei Broadcasting Station; Broadcasting Corporation of China; Revival Radio - Hsinchu; Army Radio Fuxinggang; Broadcasting Corporation of China - Miaoli, Taiwan
Special Awards
Special Awards: Excellence Awards:	Freedom Shining Path: Iron Curtain Nocturne; Red Hate; Chiang Kai-shek Hundred Days Festival; Anticommunist novel "hatred"	Taipei, Taiwan Broadcasting Army Corps: The Sound of Matsu Taiwan Guanghua; Voice of Kinmen Taiwan Guanghua; Broadcasting Corporation of China - Overseas Department President; Broadcasting Corporation of China - Overseas Department
Television Excellence Awards
News and Current Affairs Commentary Programs
Best Television Award Excellence Awards:	Dear President universally Mourning - Chiang Kai-shek special program: We are born for victory; Great for the government	Taiwan Television Enterprise: China Television Company; China Television
Education and Cultural Programs
Best Television Award Excellence Awards:	Chinese opera introduction: Ray Music; 我從大陸來，來談大陸事	Taiwan Television Enterprise: China Television Company; China Television
Popular Entertainment Programs
Best Television Award Excellence Awards:	Earth Storm (Concluded): Heroes line (Concluded); Five lights Award (Summer Children Talent Contest)	China Television Company: China Television; Taiwan Television Enterprise
Advertising Awards
Radio Awards
Best Radio Advertising Award Excellence Awards:	伊也舒洗髮粉: China Art Furniture City; Bison jeans; Lamb brand sweater; Kennedy Murray conditioner	Broadcasting Corporation of China: Taipei, Taiwan Cheng Sheng Broadcasting Corporation; Fengming Radio; Voices Broadcasting Corporation; Taipei, Taiwan Cheng Sheng Broadcasting Corporation
TV Advertisement Awards
Best Television Advertisement Award Excellence Awards:	International card stereo radio: Kodak camera; 可樂膚舒乳液; 黑松沙士; Sharp AA Automatic Refrigerator	Panasonic Taiwan Co., Ltd.: Large utility companies century; Mercedes Television Company; 創造企劃公司; Impression Inc.
Special Awards
Special Award for Social Education Excellence Awards:	國際牌安全扇	Panasonic Taiwan Co., Ltd.
Society Awards
TV Program
Social Awards Excellence Awards:	Great building (Government propaganda): Weeks Theater (Social Services); Happy Farm (Social Services); Fragrance Taiwan (Social Services); Mother and baby (Social Services); Sing sing (Pure creative promotional song); Teaching programs (Social services, including air Teaching and political teaching); Good family (Social Services)	Taiwan Television Enterprise: Taiwan Television Enterprise; Taiwan Television Enterprise; China Television Company; China Television Company; China Television Company; China Television; China Television
Broadcast Programs
Social Awards Excellence Awards:	Weekly Review (Government propaganda): News forum (Government propaganda); Agricultural Services Program (Social Services); Air Counsel (Social Services); Transportation Services (Social Services); Music Wind (Pure creative promotional song); Business Time (Social Services); Fuxinggang Commentary (Government propaganda); News radio (Government propaganda); Fishing Friends Club (Social Services); I love China (Social Services); Youth Empowerment special program (Social Services); Women's family (Social Services); Through thick and thin (Social Services)	BBC Sound of Victory: Sound Broadcasting Corporation; Taichung, Taiwan Cheng Sheng Broadcasting Corporation; Taipei Broadcasting Station; Police radio traffic specialist station; Broadcasting Corporation of China; Broadcasting Corporation of China; Army Radio Fuxinggang; Taipei Broadcasting Station; Penghu army radio; Army Corps Guoguang broadcasting station; 幼獅廣播電臺; Revival Radio - Taitung; Fengming Broadcasting Corporation
Individual Awards
Best Editor Award	Sun Jing - Friends of the family Song Yuying - Arts Nocturne	Revival Radio - Ilan; Taipei Broadcasting Station
Best Broadcaster Award	Zhang Li - China complains Li Baogan - Today's Commentary; Lai Shengqing - Our garden	Broadcasting Corporation of China; Taipei, Taiwan Cheng Sheng Broadcasting Corporation; Broadcasting Corporation of China - Tainan and Taiwan
Best Interview Award	門 琪 - Government and the people	Broadcasting Corporation of China China Broadcasting Corporation
Best Producer Award	Zheng Qinglong - 挺立在風雨中的塑像; Chen Bingshu - 自由光明之路	Broadcasting Corporation of China - Chiayi Taiwan; Taipei, Taiwan Broadcasting Army Corps
Special Award
Special Award	Broadcast television programs to promote overseas	China Television

== 1977 (13th Golden Bell Awards) ==
Award	Winner	Network
Broadcast Excellence Awards
News and Current Affairs Commentary Program
Best Broadcast Award: Excellence Awards:	Thriving: Taichung Harbor navigable today; Hualien Harbor; 創造財富; 就事論事; News Feature	Restoration Revival Radio: Broadcasting Corporation of China - Tainan and Taiwan; Army Corps Hualien Taiwan Broadcasting; Broadcasting Corporation of China - Taitung Taiwan; Police Radio Station; Fengming Radio
Education and Cultural Programs
Best Broadcast Award Excellence Awards:	Military dependents club: Country music appreciation; Corner Church and State; Love late Pavilion; Yong Huai Chiang Kai-shek; Air Counsel	Army Corps Hualien Taiwan Broadcasting: Broadcasting Corporation of China; Army Corps of Kaohsiung, Taiwan Broadcasting; China Radio; Taipei, Taiwan Cheng Sheng Broadcasting Corporation; Police Radio Station
Popular Entertainment Programs
Best Broadcast Award: Excellence Awards:	Good Morning Song: Meilun Yamashita; Christmas Eve; Night melody; Popular music; Rotary World Tour	China Kaohsiung, Taiwan Broadcasting Corporation: Broadcasting Corporation of China - Hualien Taiwan; Police Radio Station; Revival Radio - Keelung Taiwan; Revival Radio - Taichung Taiwan; China Radio
Specific Special Awards
Best Broadcast Award Excellence Awards:	開創國家的新機運: 怎麼辦; 真情實話; 自由光明之路; 對大陸青年朋友廣播; 工商貿易時間	Broadcasting Corporation of China - Overseas Department: Radio Voice of Guanghua Guanghua; Air Force Radio; Army Corps Hualien Taiwan Broadcasting; Radio Voice of Guanghua Guanghua; In the Ministry of Overseas Broadcasting Corporation
Television Excellence Awards
News and Current Affairs Commentary Programs
Best Television Award Excellence Awards:	The future success of the eleven congress: Continuity and future of conferences; Agriculture Fishing News	Taiwan Television Enterprise: China Television Company; China Television Company
Education and Cultural Programs
Best Television Award Excellence Awards:	Window of music - from traditional to modern: 跳動七十二; 分秒世界	China Television Company: China Television; Taiwan Television Enterprise
Popular Entertainment Programs
Best Television Award Excellence Awards:	得獎節目: Benefit of the village	Taiwan Television Enterprise: China Television
Advertising Awards
Radio Advertising Programs
Best Radio Advertising Award: Excellence Awards:	Aibo Te piano: International brand TECHNICS CD4 quadraphonic sound; Vowel Electric Company; Pretty good camera; Global licensing audio	Acoustic Radio: Broadcasting Corporation of China; Cheng Sheng Broadcasting Corporation Taitung Taiwan; Voices Radio; Taipei, Taiwan Cheng Sheng Broadcasting Corporation
Television Advertising Programs
Best Advertising Award Excellence Awards:	Obediently Clean Campaign: Kleenex napkins; Happy Soap; 菲仕蘭奶粉; Pine juice	East Joint Corporation: Grand Century Utilities Company Limited; Nam Chemical Company; Hongxin Trading Company; 黑松飲料股份有限公司
Individual Awards
Best Production Award	ZENG Ji Tong - "Royalton mountain" Jiang Guobin - "air posters"	Broadcasting Corporation of China - Hualien; Radio Voice of the Golden Gate Guanghua
Best Sound Award	Tsang Ming Fang - "Chinese music appreciation"	Broadcasting Corporation of China
Best Interview Award	Yang Kehua - "Taichung Harbor navigable today"	Broadcasting Corporation of China - Taiwan
Best Broadcaster Award	Li Chi-chun - "Good Morning Song"; Zhougui Sen - "high-wire screen"	Broadcasting Corporation of China - Kaohsiung; Army Corps Kaohsiung army radio broadcasting
Best Editor Award	Gao Wen Tang - 愛晚亭; Liaoyuan Tai - 台中港今天通航	China Radio; Broadcasting Corporation of China - Taiwan
Special Awards
Special Awards	領袖精神萬古常新; Teaching programs	China Television Company; China Television
Society Award
Society Awards:	Great building; Happy Farm; Refuges; Family Recipes; Vientiane fax; Current Affairs Forum; Legal knowledge; 清潔社會; Banditry reported; Defense Online; Production line	Taiwan Television Enterprise; Taiwan Television Enterprise; Taiwan TV public; Taiwan Television Enterprise; China Television Company; China Television Company; China Television Company; China Television Company; China Television; China Television; China Television
French Chinese Television
Awards:	Today, the Iron Curtain (government propaganda); Arts Nocturne (Social Services); Fuxinggang Commentary (government propaganda); 音樂廳（創作推廣純正歌曲）; 百位博士談國是（政令宣導）; Fishing Friends Club (Social Services); Evergreen Village (community service); Today's Commentary (government propaganda); News forum (government propaganda); News radio (government propaganda); Arts Nocturne (Social Services); Broadcast Comments (government propaganda); Timely (Social Services); Air law (social services); How do you do (Social Services); Stories truths (government propaganda); Miya China (government propaganda); Our words (government propaganda); 持家之道（社會服務）; Self-Corner (Social Services)	Revival Radio - Miaoli Taiwan; Taipei, Taiwan Power Revival Radio; Army Radio Fuxinggang; 軍中播總隊台北台; 軍中播總隊台北台; 軍中播總隊台北台; Broadcasting Corporation of China; Taipei, Taiwan Cheng Sheng Broadcasting Corporation; Taipei, Taiwan Cheng Sheng Broadcasting Corporation; Taipei Broadcasting Station; Taipei Broadcasting Station; Minli Radio; Police Radio Station; Police Radio Station; Police Radio Station; China Radio; Fengming Radio; Acoustic Radio; Air Force Radio; 幼獅廣播電台
Special Awards
Special Awards:	Outstanding performance in psychological operations against bandits; Outstanding performance in psychological operations against bandits; Outstanding performance in promoting universal education; Outstanding performance in promoting pure music events	Central Broadcasting System; Radio Voice of Guanghua Guanghua; Education Radio; Broadcasting Corporation of China

== 1978 (14th Golden Bell Awards) ==
Award	Winner	Network
Individual Awards
Best Director Award	Zhang Hongsen - "Your Time"	Taiwan, Taipei, Taiwan Broadcasting Company
Best Interview Award	Lu Lanjun - "jumping Sunshine"	台灣廣播公司台北台
Best Interview Award	Lin Lin - "平交道－街頭廣播時間"	Police Broadcasting Service
Best Editor Award	Guiwen Fei - "beautiful melody"	China Radio
Best Production Award	Chao Ching Juan - "recording closeup - Chungli election harassment truth" Chennai Hui - "News Feature"	Police Broadcasting Service; Air Force Radio
Best Broadcaster Award	West Wei Fang - "Arts Night Talk" 于美麗、國芬、黃凱童、新 - "air posters"	Taipei City Government radio station Guanghua Radio
Best Recording Award	Li Zhengji - "Revival Club"	Hualien, Taiwan Radio Revival
Society Awards
Best Society Awards:	Today Taiwan	Taiwan Television Enterprise
Best Society Awards:	Chinese opera introduction	Taiwan Television Enterprise
Best Society Awards:	Starship	Taiwan Television Enterprise
Best Society Awards:	Wealthy and happy	Taiwan Television Enterprise
Best Society Awards:	Signs of the sound	China Television Company
Best Society Awards:	Continental Truth	China Television Company
Best Society Awards:	Memorable stories	China Television Company
Best Society Awards:	Mind Gymnastics	China Television Company
Best Society Awards:	Let's Talk	China Television Company
Best Society Awards:	Liouying complains	China Television
Best Society Awards:	Liouying complains	China Television
Best Society Awards:	Happy society	China Television
Best Society Awards:	Happy Angel	China Television
Best Society Awards:	南來北往	China Television
Best Society Awards:	Horizon	China Television
Best Society Awards:	Streets	Showtime Broadcasting Corporation
Best Society Awards:	Transport Services	Police Radio Station
Best Society Awards:	Christmas Eve	Police Radio Station
Best Society Awards:	Holidays Corner	幼獅廣播電台
Best Society Awards:	Kiss homes	幼獅廣播電台
Best Society Awards:	Arts Nocturne	Taipei Municipal Radio
Best Society Awards:	News radio	Taipei Municipal Radio
Best Society Awards:	Our Culture	Education Radio
Best Society Awards:	Scientific knowledge	Education Radio
Best Society Awards:	Aspirations Peak	Air Force Radio
Best Society Awards:	The door to victory	Air Force Radio
Best Society Awards:	Today, the Iron Curtain	Revival Radio
Best Society Awards:	Happy family	Revival Radio
Best Society Awards:	Jingwei online	Revival Radio
Best Society Awards:	Revival Corner	Revival Radio
Best Society Awards:	Service Corner	Revival Radio
Best Society Awards:	Arts Nocturne	Revival Radio
Best Society Awards:	Farm World	Revival Radio
Best Society Awards:	Women's family	Revival Radio
Best Society Awards:	Happy Morning	Revival Radio
Best Society Awards:	Health knowledge	Revival Radio
Best Society Awards:	Granitic mountains	Revival Radio
Best Society Awards:	Voice of the fishermen	Revival Radio
Best Society Awards:	Victory music	Army Radio
Best Society Awards:	Our words	Army Radio
Best Society Awards:	Clarify the lakeside	Army Radio
Best Society Awards:	Meilun Stream	Army Radio
Best Society Awards:	A brighter future	Army Radio
Best Society Awards:	Navy drip	Army Radio
Best Society Awards:	Fuxinggang Commentary	Fuxing Broadcasting Station
Best Society Awards:	Chinese people's stories	Fuxing Broadcasting Station
Best Society Awards:	Service hours for fishermen	Voice of Guanghua Guanghua three Kinmen and Matsu
Best Society Awards:	Government and the people	Broadcasting Corporation of China
Best Society Awards:	China complains	Broadcasting Corporation of China
Best Society Awards:	Taiwan Spring	Broadcasting Corporation of China
Best Society Awards:	Vineyard	Broadcasting Corporation of China
Best Society Awards:	Mountain horn	Broadcasting Corporation of China
Best Society Awards:	Matter-	Broadcasting Corporation of China
Best Society Awards:	Talk about local things	Broadcasting Corporation of China
Best Society Awards:	Safe journey	Broadcasting Corporation of China
Best Society Awards:	In all fairness set	Broadcasting Corporation of China
Best Society Awards:	Zhang's time	Broadcasting Corporation of China
Best Society Awards:	Modern Rural	Broadcasting Corporation of China
Best Society Awards:	Time friend	Broadcasting Corporation of China
Best Society Awards:	Carp foothills	Broadcasting Corporation of China
Best Society Awards:	Local Comments	Broadcasting Corporation of China
Best Society Awards:	Today's Commentary	Cheng Sheng Broadcasting Corporation
Best Society Awards:	News forum	Cheng Sheng Broadcasting Corporation
Best Society Awards:	Justice	China Radio
Best Society Awards:	Construction of Three People's Principles and Taiwan	China Radio
Best Society Awards:	Banditry reported	Radio Voice of Victory
Best Society Awards:	Time farmers	Acoustic Radio
Best Society Awards:	Good Morning	People Radio
Best Society Awards:	Healthy Voice	Taiwan's Hsinchu, Taiwan Broadcasting Corporation
Best Society Awards:	The Sound of Success	Successful Radio
Best Society Awards:	Radio Comments	Minli Radio
Best Society Awards:	Fengming night	Fengming Radio
Best Society Awards:	Through thick and thin	Fengming Radio
Best Society Awards:	Provincial done for you	National Sound Broadcasting Corporation
Special Awards
Special Awards	Outstanding performance in psychological operations against bandits Health confidence 蔣公精神與我們同在	Central Broadcasting System; China television station Showtime Broadcasting Corporation
Broadcast Excellence Awards
News and Current Affairs Commentary Programs
Best Broadcast Awards: Excellence Awards:	Recording closeup - Chungli election harassment truth: News Feature; Milestone in the history of the Republic of China Broadcasting; Today's Commentary; Happy celebration regeneration; Leap era	Police Radio Station: Air Force Radio; Broadcasting Corporation of China; Cheng Sheng Broadcasting Corporation; Broadcasting Corporation of China; Cheng Sheng Broadcasting Corporation
Educational and Cultural Programs
Best Broadcast Award: Excellence Awards:	Revival Avenue hardworking people: Your time; Victory Garden; Corner Church and State; Happy Sunday; Our pursuit	Revival Radio - Kaohsiung Taiwan: Taiwan, Taipei, Taiwan Broadcasting Corporation; Radio Voice of Victory; Taipei, Taiwan Broadcasting Army Corps; Broadcasting Corporation of China - Taiwan and Taiwan; 幼獅廣播電台
Popular Entertainment Programs
Best Broadcast Award: Excellence Awards:	Beautiful melody: Chinese Modern Folk; Meilun Yamashita; Concert Hall; Taiwan Nights; Music City	Police Broadcasting Service: Broadcasting Corporation of China; Broadcasting Corporation of China - Hualien Taiwan; Taipei, Taiwan Broadcasting Army Corps; Radio Voice of Victory; Acoustic Radio
Subject-Oriented Awards
Best Broadcast Award: Excellence Awards:	Air posters: 夜靜心聲; 怎麼辦; October's Song; 跳躍的陽光; Iron Curtain Nocturne	Guanghua Radio: Revival Radio; Kinmen Taiwan Guanghua Radio; Broadcasting Corporation of China; 幼獅廣播電台; Matsu Taiwan Guanghua Radio
Television Excellence Awards
News and Current Affairs Commentary Programs
Best Television Award: Excellence Awards:	得獎節目: TTV News; Special Education Special Report	Chinese television production company: Taiwan Television Enterprise; China Television
Education and Cultural Programs
Best Television Award: Excellence Awards:	Love: Political teaching; 週日劇場－里長伯劇場	China Television Company: China Television; Taiwan Television Enterprise
Popular Entertainment Programs
Best Television Award: Excellence Awards:	Splendid Love: Penglai; 梅園春暉	Taiwan Television Enterprise: China Television Company; China Television
Advertising Awards
Radio Advertising Awards
Best Radio Advertising Award: Excellence Awards:	Snow Neutral Soap: Seiko quartz watch; Bee Cafe; Asia Trust; Lai Fu Color Photography	Broadcasting Corporation of China: Broadcasting Corporation of China; Radio Voice of Victory; Cheng Sheng Broadcasting Corporation; Taipei, Taiwan electro-acoustic Broadcasting Corporation
Television Advertising Awards
Best Television Advertising Award: Excellence Awards:	Off Helprin silk essence (harp articles): Yoshiyuki obediently South; Sanyo color TV (Alishan replies); 可口多多冰淇淋; 菲仕蘭奶粉	Off Cape Chemical Company: -; Sanyo Electric Co.; Daly Advertising Co.; Dada TV movie companies

== 1979 ==
14th Golden Bell Awards

== See also ==
- Golden Bell Awards
- List of Taiwanese television series
