= Radio Taiwan International =

National broadcaster and international radio service of Taiwan

Coordinates: 25°4′39.98″N 121°31′38.34″E

Radio Taiwan International 中央廣播電臺
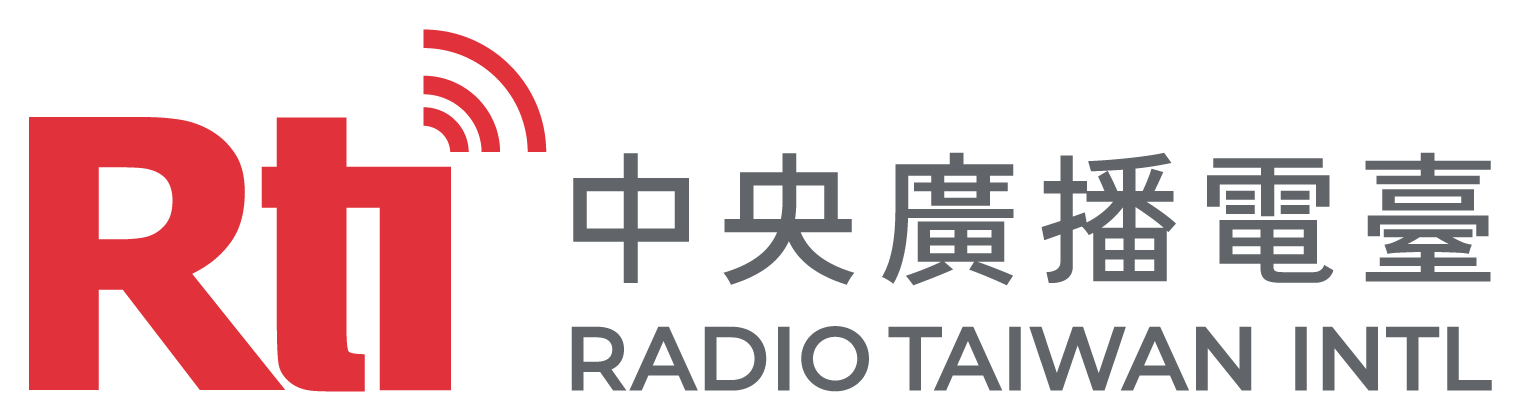

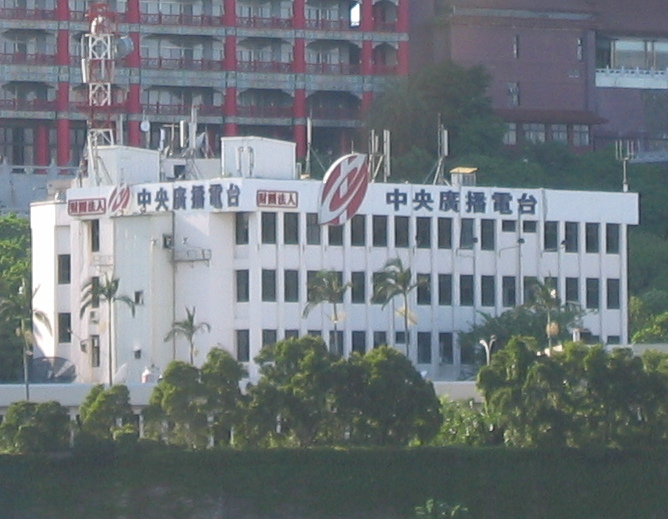
- Radio Taiwan International building in Taipei
- Type: Radio network
- Country: Taiwan
- Availability: International
- Owner: Radio Taiwan International
- Key people: Cheryl Lai (chairperson from 2022)
- Launch date: 1928
- Former names: CBS, Voice of Free China, Radio Taipei International
- Official website: Radio Taiwan International

Radio Taiwan International
- Traditional Chinese: 中央廣播電台
- Simplified Chinese: 中央广播电台
Transcriptions
Standard Mandarin
- Hanyu Pinyin: Zhōngyāng Guǎngbò Diàntái
- Wade–Giles: Chungyang Kuangpo Tien-t'ai
- Tongyong Pinyin: Jhongyang Guǎngbò Diàntái
- IPA: [ʈʂʊ́ŋjáŋ kwàŋpwô tjɛ̂ntʰǎɪ]
Southern Min
- Hokkien POJ: Tiong-iong Kóng-pò Tiān-tâi

Radio Taiwan International (RTI; Chinese: 中央廣播電臺; pinyin: Zhōngyāng Guǎngbò Diàntái) is the English name and call sign of the Central Broadcasting System (CBS), the national broadcaster and international radio service of Taiwan. It is a public radio station that broadcasts in 14 languages around the world via the internet, shortwave and podcasts. It also has Facebook fan pages in five additional languages.

== History ==
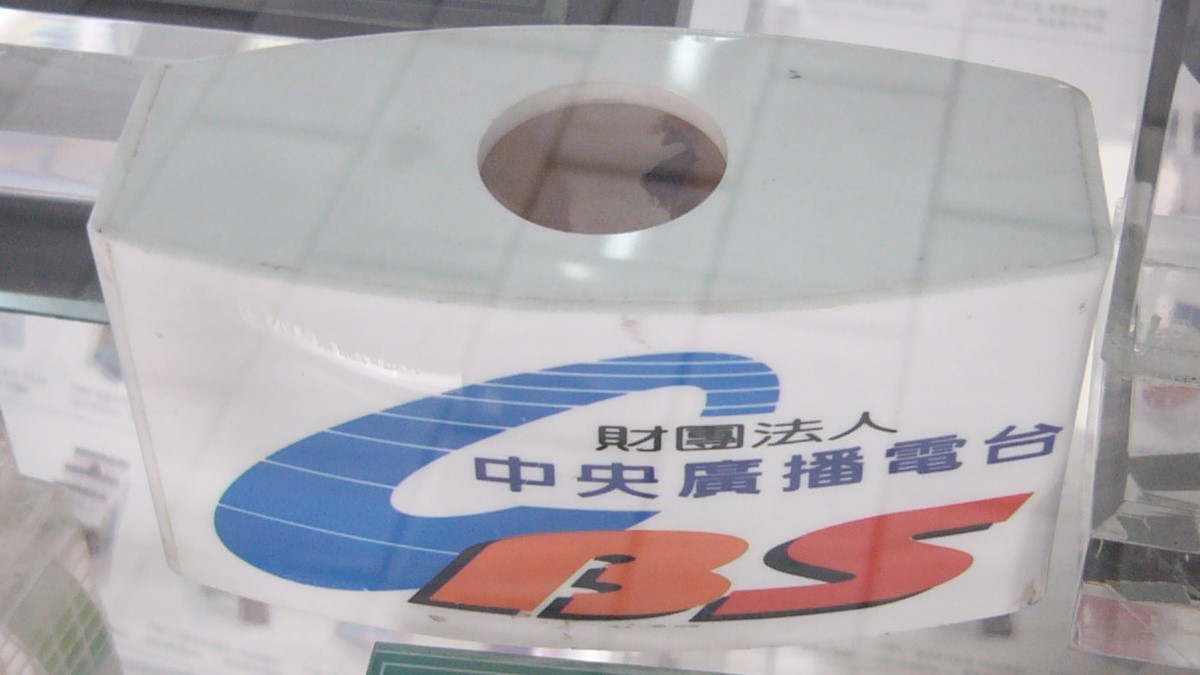
Central Broadcasting System microphone plate

The Central Broadcasting System was founded in 1928 as the voice of the Kuomintang (KMT) government quartered in Nanjing on mainland China. During the Second Sino-Japanese War the KMT was forced by the Japanese forces and pro-Japanese "rebel" Wang Jingwei government to relocate the radio station — along with the capital city, first to Hankou in the central Hubei Province and then to Chongqing in south-central China.

After the conclusion of the Second World War, which saw the surrender and withdrawal of Japanese forces, the KMT and the Chinese Communist Party resumed their civil war. The defeated KMT retreated to Taiwan in 1949 and the Central Broadcasting System moved with them.

== Current status ==
RTI currently offers audio news and programs about Taiwan in 14 languages. It also has YouTube channels offering video news and programs and can be seen on Twitter and Facebook as well.

After undergoing restructuring during the period 1996–98, CBS broadcast to mainland China and the rest of the world under the call sign Radio Taipei International and the Voice of Asia. Radio Taipei International essentially replaced the international radio services of the Broadcasting Corporation of China (BCC), known as the Voice of Free China. Radio Taipei International broadcast to China and to an international audience; by contrast, the Voice of Asia was broadcast to the Asia-Pacific region only and offered a lighter format than RTI. In 2002 the Voice of Asia call sign was dropped to leave Radio Taipei International as the sole broadcasting name for the service. This was in turn changed to Radio Taiwan International, to avoid confusion on the part of listeners, who had trouble associating Taipei with Taiwan.

In addition, via domestic AM radio and shortwave, CBS also broadcast three different "networks" in Chinese (mainly Mandarin and Taiwanese) to the mainland. These networks were the News Network (a news and information-oriented service), the Variety Network (a music and features-oriented service, also known as the Mandarin Programme, Taiwanese Programme, Perspective Program, or the Pop Network Programme), and the Dialect Network (programming aimed at the minorities of China). In time, the Variety Network was renamed the General Network, the News Network became the Mainland Network, and eventually the Mainland, General, and Dialect Network were merged in with Radio Taiwan International. One consequence of this was that CBS could no longer broadcast domestically over AM radio.

In 2022 the board of RTI appointed Cheryl Lai as the new chair of the organisation. She was at the Association for International Broadcasting (AIB) awards in 2025.

== Broadcasting details ==
Radio Taiwan International broadcasts to the following countries and regions:

- Australia and New Zealand
- China
- Europe
- Indonesia
- Japan
- Korea
- The Philippines
- South Africa
- South Asia
- Southeast Asia
- United States

Programming is carried in Taiwanese Mandarin (Guoyu), Taiwanese Hokkien, English, Cantonese, Taiwanese Hakka, Japanese, Indonesian, Thai, Tagalog (Filipino), Vietnamese, Spanish, Portuguese, German, French, Russian and most recently Ukrainian (previously also in Arabic, Burmese, Mongolian and Tibetan).

As of 1 July 2013, RTI terminated its shortwave broadcasts to North and South America due to budget cuts caused by the closure of WYFR, a Christian religious shortwave station which RTI leased airtime from and whose Florida transmitter RTI used to broadcast to the Americas. RTI programming was broadcast over WYFR on 5.95 MHz and 9.61 MHz between 17:00/18:00 hrs. Eastern until 03:00/04:00. After that point, Family Radio continued to host RTI's audio service to the Chinese community in the New York City area on a digital subchannel of Family Radio's television station, WFME-TV; this would end in October 2013, when the station was revamped into an international ethnic station, WNYJ-TV.

Radio Taiwan broadcasts daily in Mandarin, Taiwanese (Minnan or Hokkien), Hakka, Cantonese, English, German, French, Russian, Spanish, Japanese, Vietnamese, Thai, Indonesian and Korean. The English Service provides the latest news about Taiwan and a variety of engaging content, which can be seen and heard on different channels.

== Programs ==
- Taiwan Insider, its flagship weekly video and audio news magazine program
- Taiwan Today, an award-winning audio program on politics and society
- Feast Meets West, an award-winning program about food and culture
- Love! On Air, a program on different aspects of romantic relationships in Taiwan, hosted by Brendan Wong
- As a Student, its only program focuses on campus life in Taiwan, hosted by YouTube creator Wanson Wang
- Behind the Beats, the flagship music program on the music scene in Taiwan, hosted by Emma Benack

== See also ==
- Media in Taiwan
- English language print media published by the Government Information Office
  - Taiwan Review
  - Taiwan Journal
- Voice of Free China
