= Voice of Free China =

International broadcasting station of the Republic of China

The Voice of Free China (Chinese: 自由中國之聲; pinyin: Zìyóu Zhōngguó Zhīshēng) was the international broadcasting station of the Republic of China from 1949 until 1998. During the Cold War era, the station was the source of Chinese Nationalist propaganda largely aimed at discrediting the People's Republic of China and buttressing the Nationalists' claims to be the sole legitimate government of all of China.

The Voice of Free China, for many years, was owned by the Broadcasting Corporation of China. This was a private company under a government contract to provide public radio programming. The BCC still exists today, but in 1998 the Voice of Free China and the government-owned Central Broadcasting System merged.

With the easing of cross-strait relations and the liberalization of Taiwan's government, the Voice of Free China changed its name to Radio Taipei International in 1998 and also used the name "Voice of Asia" for some broadcasts. In 2003, it became Radio Taiwan International reflecting the defeat of the Kuomintang government in 2000 and the new government's orientation towards Taiwan independence from China. Today, this station is now known as Radio Taiwan International.

== See also ==
- Propaganda in the Republic of China
