= Cheryl Lai =

Taiwanese media executive

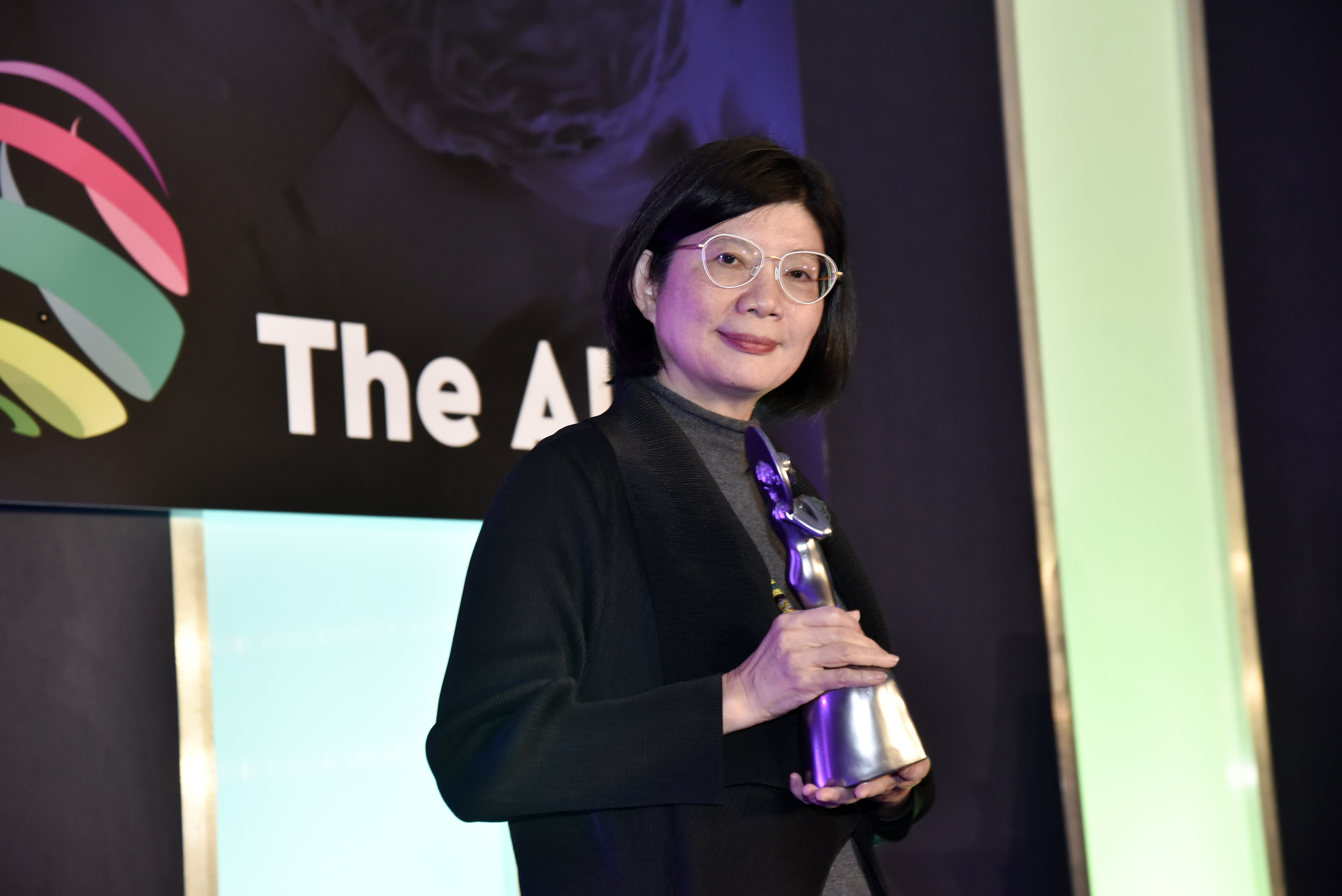
- Lai in 2025
- Occupations: journalist and media executive
- Known for: chairperson of Radio Taiwan International in 2022

Cheryl Lai is a Taiwanese media executive who has been a cultural attaché in the UK and Japan. She became the chairperson of Radio Taiwan International in 2022.

== Life ==
Lai was the President of Radio Taiwan International from 2003 to 2006. The service broadcasts in 14 languages and is praised by the Taiwan's Ministry of Culture.

In 2017 she was in London as a cultural attaché in London. She left in 2019 to join a cultural exchange project with Japan. She was there until 2021.

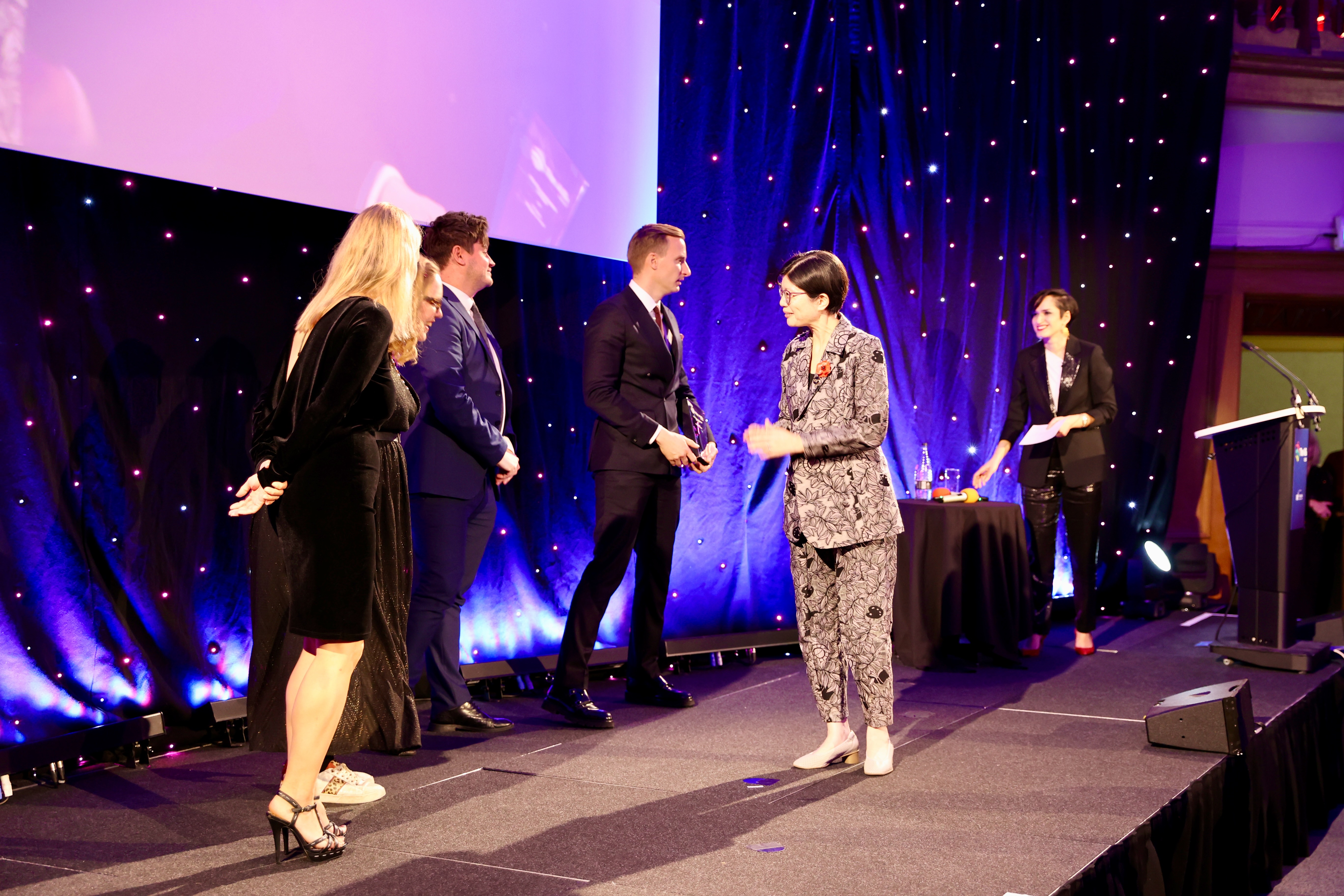
AIB award to ITN awarded by Lai

Lai became the chairperson of Radio Taiwan International in 2022 after she was appointed by the board. She was at the AIB awards where she awarded the prize for "Continuing News Coverage" to ITN for their coverage of "Partygate".

In 2024 she was in Malaysia talking about how RTI was a supporter of democracy in Myanmar, Hong Kong and Mongolia.

Lai was a founder of the Association for Taiwan Journalists (ATJ) and the Taiwan Foreign Correspondents Club (TFCC).

In 2025 she was at the 21st Association for International Broadcasting (AIB) awards at the Hyatt Hotel in London where the RTI was the official broadcast partner.
