= Taiwan Today =

Taiwanese digital newsletter

- Available in: English, French, Spanish, German, Russian, Japanese, Vietnamese, Indonesian
- Headquarters: Taipei, Taiwan
- Owner: Ministry of Foreign Affairs
- Creator: Government Information Office
- Website: https://taiwantoday.tw/
- Launched: June 1, 2009
- Current status: active

Taiwan Today (Chinese: 今日台灣; pinyin: Jīnrì Táiwān), is a digital newsletter owned by the Ministry of Foreign Affairs of Taiwan. The newsletter includes sections such as national breaking news, photographs, special reports, editorials, commentaries, event information, and topical cartoons, offering broad coverage of events in various aspects of the livelihood, politics, economy, culture, and technology of the Taiwanese people in Taiwan and the world.

The Ministry of Foreign Affairs announced that it will close the Taiwan Today newsletter on December 31, 2026, citing optimization, budget reallocation, and institutional modernization.

== History ==
On June 1, 2009, the Government Information Office relaunched the newspaper Taiwan Journal (Chinese: 台灣紀事報; pinyin: Táiwān Jìshìbào) as a digital news portal under the name Taiwan Today (stylized in its logo as T@iwan Today), with contents in English. Due to a reorganization of the central government, the functions and administration of the public foreign information media were transferred to the Ministry of Foreign Affairs on May 20, 2012. Meanwhile, other historical publications of the state, such as the monthly magazine of essays and cultural reports Taiwan Review, also from the Government Information Office in its origins, they maintained their trajectory in a coordinated manner within the government's international dissemination network, and, eventually, their historical content was consolidated on the digital news platform Taiwan Today, although the latter maintained its printed version uninterrupted until March 2026. Digital archives of Taiwan Today and its nine different language editions were taken offline starting in July 2026.

Over time, sub-portals in more languages were added, including French, German, and Spanish, among others.
