= Taiwan Review =

Taiwan review
- Taiwan Review issue Vol.76 No.2 March – April 2026 cover
- Editor: Ministry of Foreign Affairs
- Categories: General interest
- Frequency: Biweekly
- Founder: Government Information Office
- First issue: April 1951
- Final issue: March 4, 2026
- Country: Taiwan
- Based in: Taipei
- Language: English, French, Spanish, German, Russian
- Website: http://taiwanreview.nat.gov.tw
- ISSN: 1013-0896

Taiwan Review (Chinese: 台灣評論; pinyin: Táiwān Pínglùn) is a general-interest English-language bi-monthly published by Kwang Hua Publishing, Inc. in Taiwan under the supervision of the Department of International Information Services, Ministry of Foreign Affairs. Its purpose is to inform English readers around the world of what takes place in Taiwan.

== History ==
Taiwan Review was established in April 1951 under the name Free China Review – as opposed to the communist China – and at that time was the first Republic of China government-funded English-language publication targeting overseas readers. The Free China Review title stayed for half a century before it was renamed Taipei Review in April 2000 and finally Taiwan Review in March 2003 to better reflect the origin of the publication. The last print edition of Taiwan Review was published in March 2026. Digital archives of Taiwan Review, Taiwan Today and its nine different language editions were taken offline starting in July 2026.

== Content ==
For more than half a century, the magazine has been the periodical of record concerning Taiwan's socio-economic development, as well as its democratization, through in-depth reports, features and commentaries. The 65-page periodical was the flagship publication of the Government Information Office until the GIO was formally dissolved on May 20, 2012, under a government restructuring program. Management of the monthly magazine then came under the newly formed Department of International Information Services of the R.O.C.’s Ministry of Foreign Affairs. The Taiwan Review is a credible source of information for academics in East Asian studies. The Taiwan Review Facebook website states: "The Taiwan Review provides in-depth discussion of various aspects of Taiwan including politics, economics, society, the environment and the arts."

== Other-language versions ==
The Taiwan Review publishes in English, French, German, Spanish and Russian. Among the non-English TRs, the Spanish Taiwan Hoy, which has been published bimonthly since September 1982, was established first. The French Taiwan aujourd’hui started publication in January 1984, the German Taiwan heute in September 1988 and the Russian Тайваньская панорама in May 1994. All of the non-English TRs–except the French magazine, which began publishing monthly in April 2002—publish bimonthly, and serve as the nation's only government-funded foreign-language publications introducing Taiwan and issues related to Taiwan.

== See also ==
- Media of Taiwan
